= List of protected areas of Illinois =

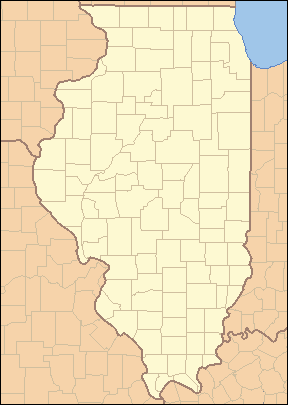
Map of Protected Areas of Illinois
Each dot is linked to the corresponding article:
Parks; Forests; Recreation Areas;
Fish and Wildlife Areas; Natural Areas;
National Historic Sites and Trails

Illinois has a variety of protected areas, including over 123 state-protected areas, dozens of federally protected areas, hundreds of county-level and municipal park areas, and historic sites under various governmental levels of protection. Illinois also contains sites designated as internationally important protected areas. These multiple levels of protection contribute to a statewide network of numerous recreation opportunities and conservation schemes, sometimes in a small area. For example, DeKalb County contains a 1,000-acre (4.0 km^{2}) forest preserve system and a 1,500-acre (6.1 km^{2}) state park (Shabbona Lake State Park); within DeKalb County, the DeKalb Park District in the City of DeKalb has a 700-acre (2.8 km^{2}) park system.

== State protected areas ==
Illinois state-owned protected areas include state parks, state forests, state recreation areas, state fish and wildlife areas, state natural areas, and one state trail. These areas are all administered by the Illinois Department of Natural Resources. In addition, dozens of state historic sites are administered by the Illinois Historic Preservation Division.

=== State historic sites ===
State historic sites are typically protected for their historic and cultural importance but may include a nature preservation component, such as at Cahokia Mounds State Historic Site and Lincoln's New Salem. For a list, see Illinois Historic Preservation Division.

=== State parks ===
State parks are owned by the state and generally administered by the Illinois Department of Natural Resources. Specifically, "State Park" refers to sites "exhibiting exceptional scenic and natural features and terrain" and that "offer a wide range of recreational opportunities for the public to enjoy".

| Name | County | Area (acres) | Area (km^{2}) | Established | Bodies of water | Image | Remarks |
|---|---|---|---|---|---|---|---|
| Adeline Jay Geo-Karis Illinois Beach State Park | Lake | 4,160 | 16.8 | 1948 | Lake Michigan | | |
| Apple River Canyon State Park | Jo Daviess | 297 | 1.20 | 1932 | Apple River | | |
| Argyle Lake State Park | McDonough | 1,700 | 6.9 | 1948 | Argyle Lake | | |
| Beall Woods State Park | Wabash | 635 | 2.57 | 1966 | Coffee Creek | | |
| Beaver Dam State Park | Macoupin | 750 | 3.0 | 1947 | Beaver Dam Lake | | |
| Buffalo Rock State Park & Effigy Tumuli | LaSalle | 298 | 1.21 | November 15, 1928 | Illinois River | | |
| Castle Rock State Park | Ogle | 2,000 | 8.1 | 1921 | Rock River | | |
| Cave-in-Rock State Park | Hardin | 204 | 0.83 | 1929 | Ohio River | | |
| Chain O'Lakes State Park | McHenry | 1,700 | 6.9 | 1945 | Bluff Lake, Catherine Lake, Channel Lake, Fox Lake, Fox River, Grass Lake, Marie Lake, Nippersink Lake, Petite Lake, Pistakee Lake, Redhead Lake, Turner Lake | | |
| Channahon State Park | Will | 20.5 | 0.083 | 1932 | DuPage River, Des Plaines River, Kankakee River | | |
| Delabar State Park | Henderson | 89 | 0.36 | 1960 | Mississippi River | | |
| Dixon Springs State Park | Pope | 801 | 3.24 | 1946 | Wabash River | | |
| Donnelley/Depue State Park | Putnam | 3,015 | 12.20 | 1982 | Lake DePue, Spring Lake, Coleman Lake, Illinois River | | |
| Ferne Clyffe State Park | Johnson | 2,430 | 9.8 | 1949 | Ferne Clyffe Lake | | |
| Fort Massac State Park | Massac | 1,450 | 5.9 | 1908 | Ohio River | | |
| Fox Ridge State Park | Coles | 2,064 | 8.35 | 1930s | Ridge Lake, Embarras River | | |
| Gebhard Woods State Park | Grundy | 30 | 0.12 | 1934 | Nettle Creek | | |
| Giant City State Park | Jackson, Union | 1,100 | 4.5 | 1927 | Little Grassy Lake, Indian Creek | | |
| Hennepin Canal Parkway State Park | Bureau, Lee, Whiteside, Rock Island, Henry | 60,314 | 244.08 | 1970 | Hennepin Canal | | 104.5-mile (168.2 km) linear park (W To Moline then N to Rock Falls vic.) |
| Horseshoe Lake State Park | Madison | 2,960 | 12.0 | ? | Horseshoe Lake | | |
| Illini State Park | LaSalle | 510 | 2.1 | 1934 | Illinois River | | |
| James "Pate" Philip State Park | DuPage, Kane | 3,432 | 13.89 | 1991 | Brewester Creek | | |
| Johnson-Sauk Trail State Park | Henry | 1,365 | 5.52 | ? | Johnson-Sauk Trail Lake | | |
| Jubilee College State Park | Peoria | 3,200 | 13 | 1933 | Jubilee Creek | | |
| Kankakee River State Park | Kankakee, Will | 4,000 | 16 | 1938 | Kankakee River | Old_Bridge_Piers_P1010079_Kankakee_River_SP_(old_Bridge_Piers) | |
| Lake Le-Aqua-Na State Park | Stephenson | 715 | 2.89 | 1948 | Lake Le-Aqua-Na | | |
| Lake Murphysboro State Park | Jackson | 1,022 | 4.14 | 1948 | Lake Murphysboro | | |
| Lincoln Trail State Park | Clark | 1,023 | 4.14 | 1958 | Lincoln Trail Lake | | |
| Lowden State Park | Ogle | 207 | 0.84 | 1945 | Rock River | | |
| Matthiessen State Park | LaSalle | 1,700 | 6.9 | 1943 | Deer Park Lake, Vermilion River | | |
| Mississippi Palisades State Park | Carroll | 2,500 | 10 | 1973 | Mississippi River, Apple River | | |
| Moraine Hills State Park | McHenry | 2,200 | 8.9 | 1939 | Lake Defiance, Fox River | | |
| Morrison-Rockwood State Park | Whiteside | 1,164 | 4.71 | 1971 | Rock Creek, Lake Carlton | | |
| Nauvoo State Park | Hancock | 148 | 0.60 | ? | Mississippi River, Lake Horton | 3._Nauvoo_State_Park_and_Museum_(Nauvoo,_Illinois)_on_the_Mormon_Pioneer_National_Historic_Trail_(2004)_(883e3aa6-cf09-4e12-ae20-49477530361b) | |
| Pere Marquette State Park | Jersey | 8,050 | 32.6 | 1931 | Mississippi River, Illinois River | | |
| Red Hills State Park | Lawrence | 967 | 3.91 | 1953 | Muddy Creek | | |
| Rock Cut State Park | Winnebago | 3,092 | 12.51 | 1957 | Pierce Lake, Olson Lake | | |
| Rock Island Trail State Park | Stark, Peoria | | | 1989 | None | | 26-mile (42 km) public rail trail. |
| Shabbona Lake State Park | DeKalb | 1,550 | 6.3 | 1978 | Shabbona Lake | | |
| Siloam Springs State Park | Adams, Brown | 3,323 | 13.45 | 1940 | | | |
| South Shore State Park | Clinton | 26,000 | 110 | ? | Carlyle Lake | | |
| Starved Rock State Park | LaSalle | 2,630 | 10.6 | 1911 | Illinois River | | |
| Walnut Point State Park | Douglas | 671 | 2.72 | 1968 | | | |
| Weinberg-King State Park | Schuyler | 772 | 3.12 | 1968 | ? | | |
| Wolf Creek State Park | Shelby | 23,500 | 95 | 1968 | Lake Shelbyville, Wolf Creek | | |

=== State fish and wildlife areas ===
Areas whose primary purpose is to "reserve land and water areas for production and conservation of fish or wildlife and to provide hunting, fishing, trapping, observation, and other forms of compatible recreational use."

| Name | County | Area (acres) | Area (km^{2}) | Established | Bodies of water | Image | Remarks |
|---|---|---|---|---|---|---|---|
| Anderson Lake State Fish & Wildlife Area | Fulton | 2,247 | 9.09 | 1947 | Anderson Lake | | |
| Baldwin Lake State Fish & Wildlife Area | Randolph | 2,018 | 8.17 | ? | Baldwin Lake | | |
| Banner Marsh State Fish and Wildlife Area | Fulton | 4,363 | 17.66 | 1980s | Illinois River | | |
| Cape Bend State Fish and Wildlife Area | Alexander | 1,380 | 5.6 | ? | | | |
| Carlyle Lake State Fish and Wildlife Area | Fayette | 37,000 | 150 | 1966 | Carlyle Lake | | |
| Coffeen Lake State Fish and Wildlife Area | Montgomery | 297 | 1.20 | 1966 | Coffeen Lake, Shoal Creek | | |
| Crawford County State Fish and Wildlife Area | Crawford | 1,129 | 4.57 | ? | Huston Creek | | |
| Des Plaines Fish and Wildlife Area | Will | 5,000 | 20 | 1948 | Kankakee River, Milliken Lake | | |
| Devils Island Wildlife Management Area | Alexander, Union | 2,741 | 11.09 | ? | Mississippi River, Picayune Chute | | |
| Double T State Fish and Wildlife Area | Fulton | 1,961 | 7.94 | 2001 | Double T Lake | | |
| Edward R. Madigan State Fish and Wildlife Area | Logan | 974 | 3.94 | 1971 | Salt Creek | | |
| Green River State Wildlife Area | Lee | 2,565 | 10.38 | 1940 | Green River | | |
| Hamilton County State Fish and Wildlife Area | Hamilton | 1,683 | 6.81 | 1962 | Dolan Lake | | |
| Heidecke Lake State Fish & Wildlife Area | Grundy | 1,300 | 5.3 | ? | Heidecke Lake | | |
| Horseshoe Lake State Fish & Wildlife Area | Alexander | 10,200 | 41 | ? | Horseshoe Lake | | |
| Iroquois County State Wildlife Area | Iroquois | 2,480 | 10.0 | 1944 | None | | Occupies the edge of the former Glacial Lake Watseka. |
| Jim Edgar Panther Creek State Fish and Wildlife Area | Cass | 16,550 | 67.0 | June 1993 | Gridley Lake, Prairie Lake, Drake Lake | | |
| Kaskaskia River State Fish & Wildlife Area | St. Clair, Monroe, Randolph | 20,000 | 81 | ? | Kaskaskia River, Baldwin Lake | | |
| Kinkaid Lake State Fish and Wildlife Area | Jackson | 11,750 | 47.6 | 1968 | Kinkaid Lake, Johnson Creek, Reed Creek | | |
| Kishwaukee River State Fish and Wildlife Area | DeKalb | 570 | 2.3 | 2002 | Kishwaukee River | | |
| LaSalle Lake State Fish & Wildlife Area | LaSalle | 2,058 | 8.33 | ? | LaSalle Lake | | |
| Mackinaw River State Fish and Wildlife Area | Tazewell | 1,448 | 5.86 | 1970 | Mackinaw River | | |
| Marshall State Fish & Wildlife Area | Marshall | 6,000 | 24 | 1925 | Illinois River | | |
| Mautino State Fish and Wildlife Area | Bureau | 911 | 3.69 | ? | 15 lakes | | |
| Mazonia/Braidwood State Fish and Wildlife Area | Grundy | 1,017 | 4.12 | 1981 | Braidwood Lake | | |
| Mermet Lake State Fish and Wildlife Area | Massac | 2,630 | 10.6 | 1949 | Mermet Lake | | |
| Middle Fork State Fish and Wildlife Area | Vermilion | 2,700 | 11 | 1986 | Middle Fork | | |
| Mississippi River State Fish and Wildlife Area | Jersey, Calhoun | 24,386 | 98.69 | ? | Stump Lake, Fuller Lake | | |
| Newton Lake State Fish and Wildlife Area | Jasper | 1,775 | 7.18 | 1979 | Newton Lake, Sand Creek, Laws Creek | | |
| Peabody River State Fish and Wildlife Area | Randolph | 2,200 | 8.9 | ? | 20 lakes | | |
| Pekin Lake State Fish and Wildlife Area | Tazewell | 1,181 | 4.78 | ? | Pekin Lake, Worley Lake | | |
| Powerton Lake State Fish and Wildlife Area | Tazewell | 1,426 | 5.77 | September 18, 1984 | Powerton Lake | | |
| Ray Norbut State Fish and Wildlife Area | Pike | 1,140 | 4.6 | 1970 | Illinois River | | |
| Rend Lake State Fish and Wildlife Area | Franklin, Jefferson | 38,900 | 157 | ? | Rend Lake | | |
| Rice Lake State Fish and Wildlife Area | Fulton | 5,660 | 22.9 | 1945 | Rice Lake | | |
| Saline County State Fish and Wildlife Area | Saline | 1,270 | 5.1 | 1959 | Glen O. Jones Lake | | |
| Sam Dale Lake State Fish and Wildlife Area | Wayne | 1,302 | 5.27 | 1959 | Sam Dale Lake | | |
| Sam Parr State Fish and Wildlife Area | Jasper | 1,180 | 4.8 | 1960 | | | |
| Sanganois State Fish and Wildlife Area | Cass, Schuyler, Mason | 10,360 | 41.9 | 1948 | | | |
| Shelbyville State Fish and Wildlife Area | Moultrie | 6,200 | 25 | ? | Kaskaskia River, West Okaw River | | |
| Silver Springs State Fish & Wildlife Area | Kendall | 1,350 | 5.5 | 1969 | Fox River, Loon Lake, Beaver Lake, Silver Springs | | |
| Snakeden Hollow State Fish and Wildlife Area | Knox | 2,500 | 10 | 1987 | Snakeden Hollow Lake | | |
| Spring Lake Fish and Wildlife Area | Tazewell | 2,032 | 8.22 | 1950 | Spring Lake | | |
| Ten Mile Creek State Fish & Wildlife Area | Hamilton, Jefferson | 6,000 | 24 | 1988 | Ten Mile Creek | | |
| Turkey Bluffs State Fish and Wildlife Area | Randolph | 2,264 | 9.16 | ? | | | |
| Union County State Fish and Wildlife Area | Union | 6,202 | 25.10 | 1940s | | | |
| Woodford State Fish and Wildlife Area | Woodford | 2,900 | 12 | | Illinois River, Upper Peoria Lake | | |

=== State recreation areas ===
| Name | County | Area (acres) | Area (km^{2}) | Established | Bodies of water | Image | Remarks |
|---|---|---|---|---|---|---|---|
| Clinton Lake State Recreation Area | DeWitt | 9,300 | 38 | 1978 | Clinton Lake, Salt Creek, Old Creek | | |
| Eagle Creek State Recreation Area | Shelby | 11,100 | 45 | May 1963 | Lake Shelbyville, Eagle Creek | | |
| Eldon Hazlet State Recreation Area | Clinton | 3,000 | 12 | ? | Carlyle Lake, Lake Shelbyville | | |
| Frank Holten State Recreation Area | St. Clair | 1,080 | 4.4 | 1964 | Whispering Willow Lake, Grand Marais Lake | | |
| Golconda Marina State Recreation Area | Pope | 274 | 1.11 | ? | Ohio River | | |
| Kickapoo State Recreation Area | Vermilion | 2,842 | 11.50 | 1939 | Middle Fork | | |
| Moraine View State Recreation Area | McLean | 1,687 | 6.83 | 1959 | Dawson Lake, Salt Creek | | |
| Prophetstown State Recreation Area | Whiteside | 53 | 0.21 | 1947 | Coon Creek, Rock River | | |
| Pyramid State Recreation Area | Perry | 19,701 | 79.73 | 1968 | Super Lake | | |
| Ramsey Lake State Recreation Area | Fayette | 1,980 | 8.0 | ? | Ramsey Lake, Ramsey Creek | | |
| Randolph County State Recreation Area | Randolph | 1,101 | 4.46 | 1958 | Randolph County Lake | | |
| Sangchris Lake State Recreation Area | Christian, Sangamon | 3,022 | 12.23 | 1964 | Sangchris Lake | | |
| Stephen A. Forbes State Recreation Area | Marion | 3,103 | 12.56 | 1959 | | | |
| Washington County State Recreation Area | Washington | 900 | 3.6 | 1959 | | | |
| Wayne Fitzgerrell State Recreation Area | Franklin, Jefferson | 3,300 | 13 | 1975 | Rend Lake, Big Muddy River | | |
| Weldon Springs State Recreation Area | DeWitt | 550 | 2.2 | 1948 | Salt Creek | | |

=== State natural areas ===
Areas of land which "either retains or has recovered to a substantial degree its original natural or primeval character, though it need not be completely undisturbed, or has floral, faunal, ecological, geological or archaeological features of scientific, educational, scenic or esthetic interest."

| Name | County | Area (acres) | Area (km^{2}) | Established | Bodies of water | Image | Remarks |
|---|---|---|---|---|---|---|---|
| Cache River State Natural Area | Johnson | 14,314 | 57.93 | 1970 | Cache River | | |
| Franklin Creek State Natural Area | Lee | 882 | 3.57 | 1982 | Franklin Creek | | |
| Fults Hill Prairie State Natural Area | Monroe | 997 | 4.03 | 1970 | Kidd Lake | | |
| Goose Lake Prairie State Natural Area | Grundy | 2,537 | 10.27 | 1969 | Goose Lake, Des Plaines River, Kankakee River, Illinois River | | |
| Harry "Babe" Woodyard State Natural Area | Vermilion | 1,104 | 4.47 | ? | Little Vermilion River (Wabash River tributary) | | Managed as an outlying unit of Kickapoo State Recreation Area |
| Illinois Caverns State Natural Area | Monroe | 120 | 0.49 | 1985 | None | | 9.6 km of the park are passages underground. |
| Mitchell's Grove Nature Preserve | LaSalle | 184 | 0.74 | 1997 | Little Vermilion River (Illinois River tributary) | | |
| Piney Creek Ravine State Natural Area | Jackson, Randolph | 198 | 0.80 | 1972 | Piney Creek | | |
| Prairie Ridge State Natural Area | Jasper, Marion | 4,101 | 16.60 | | | | |
| Revis Hill Prairie | Mason | 412.7 | 1.670 | 1973 | | | Managed as an outlying unit of Sand Ridge State Forest |
| Sand Prairie-Scrub Oak Nature Preserve | Mason | 1,550 | 6.3 | 1970 | | | Managed as an outlying unit of Sand Ridge State Forest |
| Sielbeck Forest Natural Area | Johnson | 385 | 1.56 | 1998 | | | |
| Spitler Woods State Natural Area | Macon | 202.5 | 0.819 | 1937 | Squirrel Creek | | |
| Volo Bog State Natural Area | Lake | 1,150 | 4.7 | 1970 | Volo Bog | | |

=== Other state protected areas ===
| Name | County | Area (acres) | Area (km^{2}) | Established | Bodies of water | Image | Remarks |
|---|---|---|---|---|---|---|---|
| Big River State Forest | Henderson | 2,900 | 12 | 1925 | Mississippi River | | |
| Bohm Woods Nature Preserve | Madison | 92 | 0.37 | November 2006 | | | |
| Hidden Springs State Forest | Shelby | 1,200 | 4.9 | 1960 | Richland Creek, Possum Creek | | |
| Lewis and Clark State Historic Site | Madison | | | 2002 | None | | |
| North Point Marina | Lake | 297 | 1.20 | ? | Lake Michigan | | |
| Sand Ridge State Forest | Mason | 7,200 | 29 | 1939 | None | | |
| Trail of Tears State Forest | Union | 5,114 | 20.70 | 1929 | Mississippi River, Clear Creek | | |
| Tunnel Hill State Trail | Johnson, Pulaski, Saline, Williamson | | | | None | | 45-mile (72.4 km) Trail. |
| Wildlife Prairie Park | Peoria | 1,700 | 6.9 | 2000 | Deep Lake, Caboose Lake, Beaver Lake, Horseshoe Lake | | |

== Federally protected areas ==
Illinois contains one national forest, the Shawnee National Forest, one national grassland, Midewin National Tallgrass Prairie, and several other sites administered by the National Park Service, including portions of National Trails. There are also National Wildlife Refuges.

=== National Forest Service Areas ===
- Midewin National Tallgrass Prairie - 25,000 acres (100 km^{2})
- Shawnee National Forest - 500,000 acres (2,000 km^{2})

=== U.S. Wilderness Areas ===
The following U.S. Wilderness areas are located within the Shawnee National Forest and are administered by the U.S. Forest Service:

- Bald Knob Wilderness
- Bay Creek Wilderness
- Burden Falls Wilderness
- Clear Springs Wilderness
- Garden of the Gods Wilderness
- Lusk Creek Wilderness
- Panther Den Wilderness

Crab Orchard Wilderness is located within Crab Orchard National Wildlife Refuge

=== U.S. Fish and Wildlife Service Areas ===
- Chautauqua National Wildlife Refuge
- Crab Orchard National Wildlife Refuge - 43,500 acres (176 km^{2}) including the 4,050-acre (16.4 km^{2}) Crab Orchard Wilderness
- Cypress Creek National Wildlife Refuge
- Emiquon National Wildlife Refuge
- Hackmatack National Wildlife Refuge
- Kankakee National Wildlife Refuge and Conservation Area
- Mark Twain National Wildlife Refuge Complex
  - Great River National Wildlife Refuge, portions in Pike and Adams Counties, Illinois
  - Port Louisa National Wildlife Refuge, portion in Mercer County, Illinois
- Meredosia National Wildlife Refuge
- Middle Mississippi River National Wildlife Refuge
- Two Rivers National Wildlife Refuge
- Upper Mississippi River National Wildlife and Fish Refuge, portions in Jo Daviess, Carroll, Whiteside, and Rock Island Counties, Illinois

=== National Park Service ===
The National Park Service operates the federally owned Lincoln Home National Historic Site in Springfield, the Pullman National Historical Park in Chicago, and the New Philadelphia National Historic Site in Pike County in rural western Illinois. The Chicago Portage National Historic Site is a National Park Service-affiliated site which is located in the Forest Preserve District of Cook County. In addition, the National Park Service partners with the Abraham Lincoln National Heritage Area.

=== U.S. Army Corps of Engineers ===
- Carlyle Lake - 26,000 acres (110 km^{2}) of water and 11,000 acres (45 km^{2}) of public land
- Illinois Waterway
- Lake Shelbyville - 11,100-acre (45 km^{2}) lake and 23,000 acres (93 km^{2}) of land
- Rend Lake - 18,900 acres (76 km^{2}) of water and 20,000 acres (81 km^{2}) of land

== Internationally recognized protected areas ==
One UNESCO World Heritage Site in Illinois, Cahokia Mounds State Historic Site, is protected and listed as a state-owned historic site. Two of the eight World Heritage Site structures exemplifying the 20th-Century architecture of Frank Lloyd Wright are also located in Illinois: Unity Temple and the Robie House, and are protected by local and federal schemes.

In addition to cultural sites, Illinois contains five wetland areas designated as wetlands of international importance under the Ramsar Convention:

- Cache River-Cypress Creek Wetlands (including Cypress Creek National Wildlife Refuge)
- Chiwaukee Prairie Illinois Beach Lake Plain (shared with Wisconsin)
- The Emiquon Complex (including Emiquon National Wildlife Refuge)
- Sue and Wes Dixon Waterfowl Refuge
- The Upper Mississippi River Floodplain Wetlands (shared with Iowa, Minnesota, and Wisconsin)

== Local level parks ==
A variety of county and town protected areas exist in Illinois, including city park districts and county-wide Forest Preserve or Conservation Districts, as well as land owned by private conservation organizations. One of the largest systems is the Forest Preserve District of Cook County, which includes Brookfield Zoo and the Chicago Botanic Garden as well as 70,000 acres (280 km^{2}) of open land, or 11.6 percent of Cook County's land area. Under Illinois law, counties may set up a conservation land holding district, after approval by county voters. Although most of the 102 counties have not established such a public landholding agency, below are the approved county districts:

- Boone County Conservation District - 4,000 acres (16 km^{2})
- Byron Forest Preserve District - 1,708 acres (6.91 km^{2})
- Champaign County Forest Preserve District - 4,000 acres (16 km^{2})
- Forest Preserve District of Cook County - 70,000 acres (280 km^{2})
- DeKalb County Forest Preserve - 4,000 acres (16 km^{2})
- Forest Preserve District of DuPage County - 26,000 acres (110 km^{2})
- Forest Preserve District of Kane County - 20,000 acres (81 km^{2})
- Forest Preserves of the Kankakee River Valley - 465 acres (1.88 km^{2})
- Kendall County Forest Preserve District - 2,663 acres (10.78 km^{2})
- Lake County Forest Preserve - 31,000 acres (130 km^{2})
- Macon County Conservation District - 3,490 acres (14.1 km^{2})
- McHenry County Conservation District - 24,000 acres (97 km^{2})
- Putnam Country Conservation District - 1,100-acre (4.5 km^{2})
- Rock Island Forest Preserve District - 2,529 acres (10.23 km^{2})
- Vermilion County Conservation District - 6,600 acres (27 km^{2})
- Forest Preserve District of Will County - 21,966 acres (88.89 km^{2})
- Winnebago County Forest Preserve District - 11,500 acres (47 km^{2})
