= Woodford State Fish and Wildlife Area =

State park in Illinois, US

- IUCN category IV (habitat/species management area)
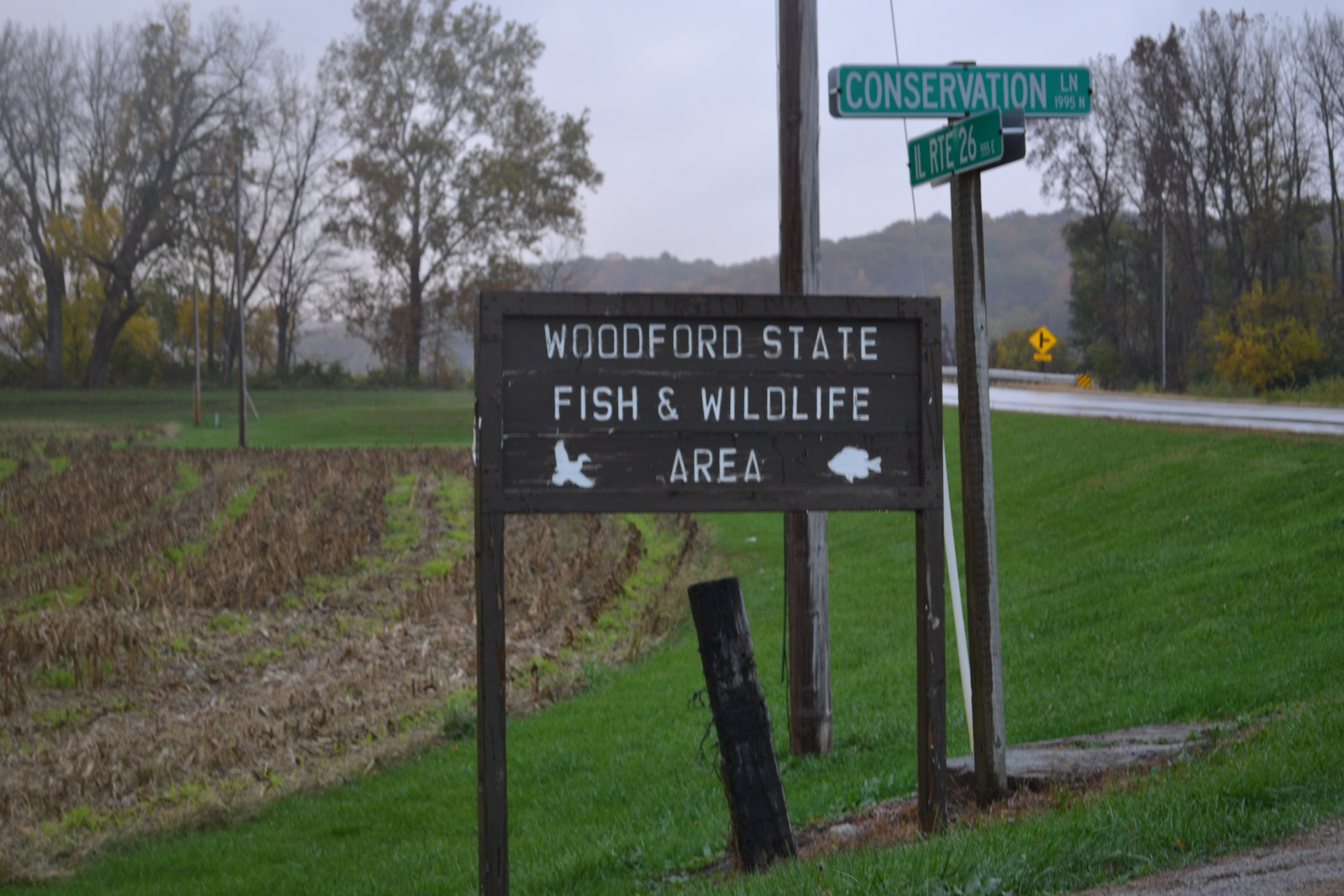
- Sign for Woodford State Fish and Wildlife Area

- Location within Illinois Location within the United States
- Location: Woodford County, Illinois, United States
- Nearest city: Lowpoint, Illinois
- Coordinates: 40°53′09″N 89°28′07″W
- Area: 2,900 acres (1,200 ha)
- Governing body: Illinois Department of Natural Resources

Woodford State Fish and Wildlife Area (commonly abbreviated as Woodford SFWA) is an Illinois state park on 2,900 acres (1,200 ha) of area Woodford County, Illinois, United States. Most of this protected area is over the Goose Lake and Upper Peoria Lake sections of the Illinois River.

== Natural features ==
The Woodford SFWA has 2,462 acres (996 ha) of water and has a major waterfowl refuge of 1,400 acres (570 ha).

=== Flora ===
The bottomland forest of the Woodford SFWA contains tree species such as cottonwood, silver maple, ash, and willow.

=== Fauna ===
Deer, raccoon, muskrat, mink, and beaver commonly make their homes in the Woodford SFWA. Birds include great blue herons, green herons, great white egrets, barred owls, red-tailed hawks, goshawks, and woodpeckers as well as various songbirds. While many waterfowl enjoy the refuge during migration, only wood ducks and Canada geese tend to nest. Peoria Audubon Society's eBird hotspot lists over 200 species spotted in the Woodford SFWA.

== Recreation ==
There are boat docks and a public boat ramp. Fishing and hunting are permitted, with 1,350 acres (550 ha) of huntable land and designated waterfowl blinds on the backwater of Goose Lake and the Illinois River channel. Campsites for tents and trailers are available from April to September, but may be inaccessible during periods of flooding. Picnic tables and a shelter are also available. Over 3 mi (4.8 km) of hiking trails are open the majority of the year from January through October, except during waterfowl fall migration.
