= Coffeen Lake State Fish and Wildlife Area =

State park in Illinois

- IUCN category IV (habitat/species management area)
- Location within Illinois Location within the United States
- Location: Montgomery County, Illinois, U.S.
- Nearest city: Coffeen, Illinois
- Coordinates: 39°03′45″N 89°24′44″W
- Area: 297 acres (120 ha)
- Established: 1966
- Governing body: Illinois Department of Natural Resources

Coffeen Lake State Fish and Wildlife Area is an Illinois state park on 297 acres (120 ha) in Montgomery County, Illinois, United States just south of Coffeen.

== History ==
The original power company built a 75 foot (23 m) high earthen dam on a branch of the east Fork of Shoal Creek in 1963. The lake filled by 1966 to serve as cooling water for the coal-fired Coffeen Power Station until the shutdown of that plant in 2019. The site was also opened as a fish and wildlife area in 1986, which after 2019 became its primary purpose. It operates under a long-term lease and management agreement between the Illinois Department of Natural Resources and Dynegy. This agreement grants authority to the State to open the lake and certain lands to the public for recreational activities, such as fishing, boating, picnicking and hunting.

== Natural features ==
The oak-hickory forests surrounding Coffeen Lake are representative of the native cover found within the Southern Till Plain Natural Division of central and southern Illinois. Soils are of loess and till, rather light and a characteristic "claypan" can be found. Pre-settlement vegetation was a mixture of 60 percent forest to 40 percent prairie and wetlands. A variety of trees, woodland and prairie plants cover the slopes of the stream valley. Muskrats, turtles, herons and mussels are seen in or near the water. Red-tailed hawk, blue jay and dragonflies may be seen overhead. Bobwhite, coyote, white-tailed deer and black rat snake are common to the area.
