= Bohm Woods Nature Preserve =

State park in Illinois, USA

- IUCN category IV (habitat/species management area)
- Interactive map of Bohm Woods Nature Preserve
- Location: Madison County, Illinois
- Nearest city: Edwardsville, Illinois
- Coordinates: 38.8092762°N 90.0066719°W
- Area: 92 acres (37 ha)
- Established: November 2006
- Governing body: Illinois Department of Natural Resources
- Website: dnr.illinois.gov/inpc/area.area7madisonbohmwoods.html

Bohm Woods Nature Preserve Area is a 92-acre (37 ha) parcel of protected land and habitat located in Madison County, near Edwardsville, in the U.S. state of Illinois.

== Description ==
The Bohm Woods Nature Preserve Area is managed as an Illinois biosphere nature reserve. It is contiguous to the campus of Southern Illinois University Edwardsville (SIUE) and the municipality of Edwardsville in Madison County. It is managed, coterminously with the nearby Horseshoe Lake State Park, by the Illinois Department of Natural Resources (IDNR) from a full-time office in nearby Granite City. The park is made up of mesic forest, dry-mesic forest, wet bottomland forest, and river bluffs. It preserves part of the bluff of the Mississippi River bottomland.

The Heartlands Conservancy, which advocates for the site, believes that it is the only remaining old growth forest land parcel remaining in Madison County. The State of Illinois purchased the land in 2006 and placed it under IDNR management. The Southern Illinois University Edwardsville campus has taken steps to create a biome corridor between Bohm Woods and its on-campus nature preserve. The nature preserve has been improved with a parking lot and a trail of approximately 2 miles (3 km) in length.
