= Rice Lake State Fish and Wildlife Area =

State park in Illinois, United States

- IUCN category IV (habitat/species management area)
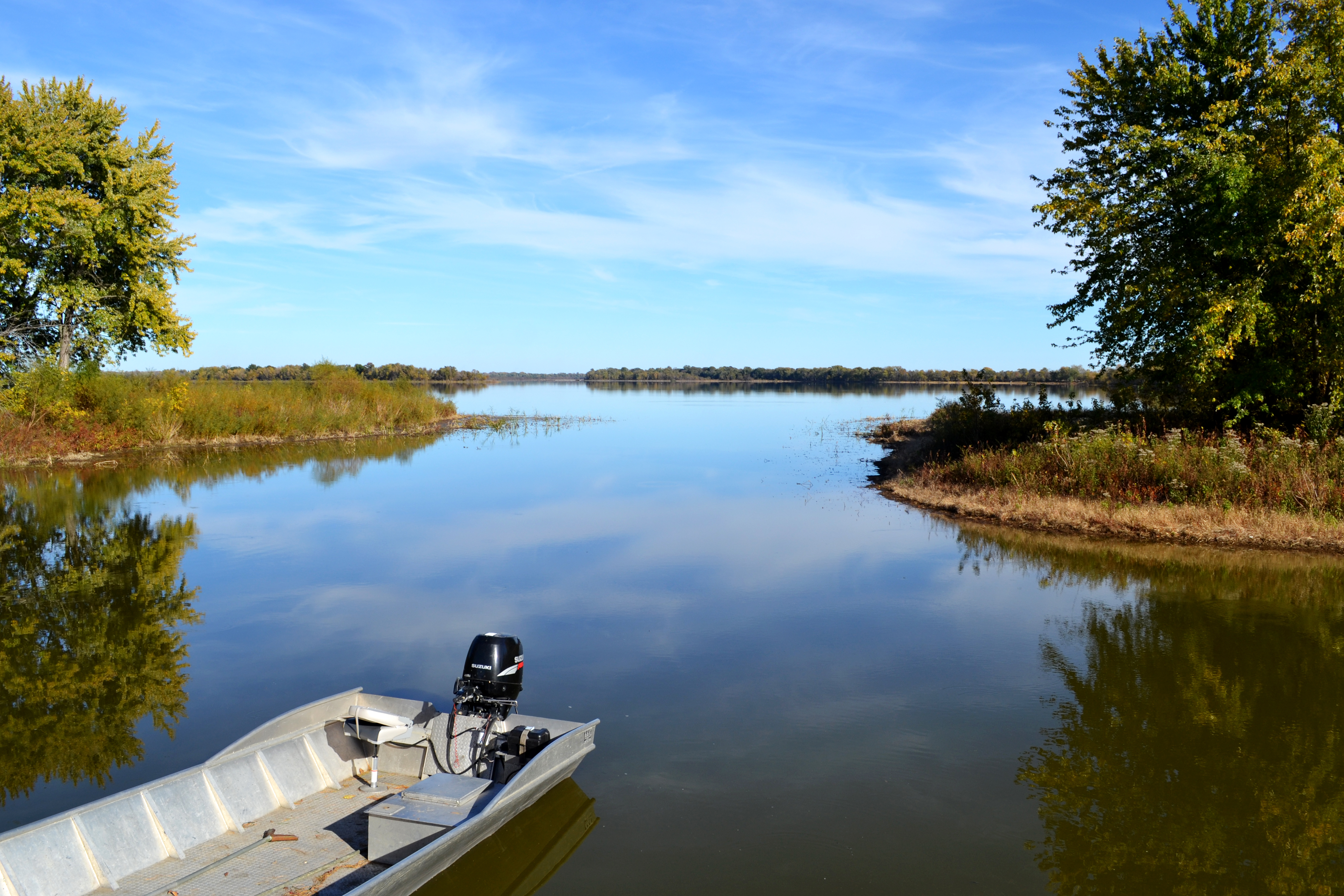

- Location within Illinois Location within the United States
- Location: Fulton County, Illinois, U.S.
- Nearest city: Canton, Illinois
- Coordinates: 40°27′43″N 89°55′25″W
- Area: 5,660 acres (2,290 ha)
- Established: 1945
- Governing body: Illinois Department of Natural Resources

Rice Lake State Fish and Wildlife Area is an Illinois state park on 5,660 acres (2,290 ha) in Fulton County, Illinois, United States. Much of the park is wetland, and the park is best known for waterfowl hunting.
