= Coffeen Power Station =

Coal power plant in Illinois, US

- Country: United States
- Location: Coffeen, Illinois
- Coordinates: 39°03′33″N 89°24′11″W
- Status: Decommissioned
- Commission date: Unit 1: 1965; Unit 2: 1972
- Decommission date: Units 1–2: November 2019
- Owner: Vistra Energy

Thermal power station
- Primary fuel: Coal
- Cooling source: Coffeen Lake

Power generation
- Units operational: 2
- Nameplate capacity: 915 MW

Coffeen Power Station was a 915 megawatt (MW) coal power plant located south of Coffeen, Illinois, near Coffeen Lake State Fish and Wildlife Area in Montgomery County, Illinois. The plant was owned by Vistra Energy. Coffeen began operations in 1965 and was shut down on November 1, 2019.

== History ==
The plant had two units: Unit 1 began operation in 1965 and Unit 2 began operation in 1972. Initially, coal was delivered via conveyor belt from a nearby coal mine. Formerly, the plant had low-sulfur coal delivered from the Powder River Basin. The plant was cooled by Coffeen Lake which was built to support the power plant in mind. Formerly ran by Central Illinois Public Service Company and later Ameren, Ameren sold the plant to current owner Dynegy in 2013. In 2018, Vistra Energy would assume control of Coffeen following its merger with Dynegy. In August 2019, Vistra Energy announced they were shutting down Coffeen by the end of the year in order to meet new revisions under the Multi-Pollutant Standard Rule set by the Illinois Pollution Control Board.

== Environmental mitigation ==
Coffeen replaced its treatment system in 2009 that reduced chemical discharge into the lake by 35%. The plant went through several mid-life updates with the installation of sulfur dioxide (SO_{2}) scrubbers in 2010 and the replacement of cyclones in 2011. Hitachi's division of Hitachi Power Systems were contracted to manufacture the scrubbers. The scrubber installations were to comply with the State of Illinois' Multi-Pollutant Standards (MPS) set in 2006.

== See also ==
- List of power stations in Illinois
