= Frank Holten State Recreation Area =

State park in Illinois, United States

- Location within Illinois Location within the United States
- Location: 4500 Pocket Road, Centreville Township, Illinois, United States
- Nearest city: East St. Louis, Illinois
- Coordinates: 38°35′30″N 90°05′42″W
- Area: 1,080 acres (437 ha)
- Established: 1964
- Governing body: Illinois Department of Natural Resources

Frank Holten State Recreation Area is an urban Illinois state park on 1,080 acres (437 ha) in unincorporated Centreville Township, St. Clair County, Illinois, United States. It is located less than five miles southeast of the Gateway Arch in Greater St. Louis. The park is bisected by Interstate 255.

== History ==
In 1932, the City of East St. Louis completed Lake Park, its second large city park, after 28 years of planning and at a cost of $5 million. At the time, it was the third largest municipal park in the nation (after Central Park in New York and Forest Park in neighboring St. Louis). It first appears as Grand Marais State Park on a 1953 road map, after previously being identified as Lake Park in 1949. Unfortunately, it was too expensive to maintain so it was sold to the State of Illinois in 1964 for $1 and renamed Grand Marais State Park, after the geographic area's historic name Grand Marais (French for "large swamp" or "great marsh"). Its name was changed to Frank Holten State Park on May 1, 1967, in honor of the recently deceased distinguished legislator from East St. Louis, who served the region in the Illinois General Assembly for 48 years.

The Grand Marais name is preserved through the 18-hole Grand Marais Golf Course. The park also contains two lakes, Whispering Willow Lake and Grand Marais Lake, that total more than 200 acres of water and 5 miles of shoreline.
