= Newton Lake State Fish and Wildlife Area =

State park in Illinois, USA

- IUCN category IV (habitat/species management area)
- Location within Illinois Location within the United States
- Location: Jasper County, Illinois, U.S.
- Nearest city: Newton, Illinois
- Coordinates: 38°54′46″N 88°18′20″W
- Area: 1,775 acres (718 ha)
- Established: 1979
- Governing body: Illinois Department of Natural Resources

Newton Lake State Fish and Wildlife Area is an Illinois state park on 1,775 acres (718 ha) in Jasper County, Illinois, United States. The park's grasslands are home to the largest of the three remaining greater prairie chicken flocks in Illinois.

The park centers on Newton Lake, an artificial reservoir constructed to provide cooling water for the Newton Power Station, a coal-fired electricity-generating power plant operated by Ameren, a public utility holding company.
