= Clinton Lake State Recreation Area =

State park in DeWitt County, Illinois, US

- Location within Illinois Location within the United States
- Location: DeWitt County, Illinois, USA
- Nearest city: DeWitt, Illinois
- Coordinates: 40°11′08″N 88°45′10″W
- Area: 9,300 acres (3,764 ha)
- Established: 1978
- Governing body: Illinois Department of Natural Resources

Clinton Lake State Recreation Area is an Illinois state park on 9,300 acres (3,764 ha) in DeWitt County, Illinois, United States.
