= Green River State Wildlife Area =

State park in Illinois, USA

- IUCN category IV (habitat/species management area)
- Location within Illinois Location within the United States
- Location: Lee County, Illinois, USA
- Nearest city: Harmon, Illinois
- Coordinates: 41°38′19″N 89°30′30″W
- Area: 2,565 acres (1,038 ha)
- Established: 1940
- Governing body: Illinois Department of Natural Resources

Green River State Wildlife Area is an Illinois state park on 2,565 acres (1,038 ha) in Lee County, Illinois, United States.

This wildlife restoration area was acquired by the State of Illinois in 1940, using funds from the Federal Aid in Wildlife Restoration Act. It is frequented by hunters, hikers, birders and other outdoor enthusiasts. All but 50 acres (20 ha) of the area, that surrounding the area residence, are available for hunting.
