= Sielbeck Forest Natural Area =

State park in Illinois, USA

- Location within Illinois Location within the United States
- Location: Massac County, Illinois, United States
- Nearest city: Metropolis, Illinois
- Coordinates: 37°13′48″N 88°45′33″W
- Area: 385 acres (156 ha)
- Established: 1998
- Governing body: Illinois Department of Natural Resources

Sielbeck Forest Natural Area is an Illinois state park on 385 acres (156 ha) in Johnson County, Illinois, United States.

== History ==
Originally owned by Ruth and Louie Sielbeck, the land went on sale following Louie's death. The Nature Conservancy bought the land in 1997 and then sold it to the Illinois Department of Natural Resources the following year.

== Activities ==
Fishing, hiking, and daytime hunting are allowed. Common animal species caught include largemouth bass, bluegill, deer, squirrel, doves, rabbits, quail, ducks and turkey. There are no site specific regulations, only statewide ones.
