= Lake Le-Aqua-Na State Recreation Area =

State park in Illinois, United States

- IUCN category III (natural monument or feature)
- Location within Illinois Location within the United States
- Location: Stephenson County, Illinois, U.S.
- Nearest city: Lena, Illinois
- Coordinates: 42°25′12″N 89°50′11″W
- Area: 715 acres (289 ha)
- Established: 1948
- Governing body: Illinois Department of Natural Resources

Lake Le-Aqua-Na State Recreation Area is an Illinois state park on 715 acres (289 ha) in Stephenson County, Illinois, United States. The park surrounds and includes Lake Le-Aqua-Na.
