= Baldwin Lake State Fish and Wildlife Area =

State park in Illinois, USA

- Location within Illinois Location within the United States
- Location: Randolph and St. Clair County, Illinois, USA
- Nearest city: Baldwin, Illinois
- Coordinates: 38°13′03″N 89°52′09″W
- Area: 2,018 acres (817 ha)
- Governing body: Illinois Department of Natural Resources

Baldwin Lake State Fish and Wildlife Area is an Illinois state park on 2,018 acres (817 ha) in Randolph and St. Clair County, Illinois, United States.
