= Shelbyville State Fish and Wildlife Area =

State park in Illinois, United States

- IUCN category IV (habitat/species management area)
- Location within Illinois Location within the United States
- Location: Moultrie County, Illinois, United States
- Nearest city: Bethany, Illinois
- Coordinates: 39°34′07″N 88°33′18″W
- Area: 6,200 acres (2,500 ha)
- Governing body: Illinois Department of Natural Resources

Shelbyville State Fish and Wildlife Area is an Illinois state park on 6,200 acres (2,500 ha) in Moultrie County, Illinois, United States. It covers part of the watershed of Lake Shelbyville.
