= Crawford County State Fish and Wildlife Area =

State park in Illinois, USA

- IUCN category IV (habitat/species management area)
- Location within Illinois Location within the United States
- Location: Crawford County, Illinois, USA
- Nearest city: Hutsonville, Illinois
- Coordinates: 39°05′33″N 87°42′45″W
- Area: 1,129 acres (457 ha)
- Governing body: Illinois Department of Natural Resources

Crawford County State Fish and Wildlife Area is an Illinois state park on 1,129 acres (457 ha) in Crawford County, Illinois, United States.
