= Rend Lake State Fish and Wildlife Area =

State park in Illinois, United States

- IUCN category IV (habitat/species management area)
- Location within Illinois Location within the United States
- Location: Franklin and Jefferson Counties, Illinois, USA
- Nearest city: Bonnie, Illinois
- Coordinates: 38°11′54″N 89°00′18″W
- Area: 38,900 acres (15,700 ha)
- Governing body: Illinois Department of Natural Resources

Rend Lake State Fish and Wildlife Area is an Illinois state park on 38,900 acres (15,700 ha) in Franklin and Jefferson Counties, United States. It is mostly hardwood forests and fields
