= Golconda Marina State Recreation Area =

State park in Illinois, United States

- IUCN category V (protected landscape/seascape)
- Location within Illinois Location within the United States
- Location: Pope County, Illinois, USA
- Nearest city: Golconda, Illinois
- Coordinates: 37°22′13″N 88°28′55″W
- Area: 274 acres (111 ha)
- Governing body: Illinois Department of Natural Resources

Golconda Marina State Recreation Area is an Illinois state park on 274 acres (111 ha) in Pope County, Illinois, United States.
