= Sanganois State Fish and Wildlife Area =

State park in Illinois, USA

- IUCN category IV (habitat/species management area)
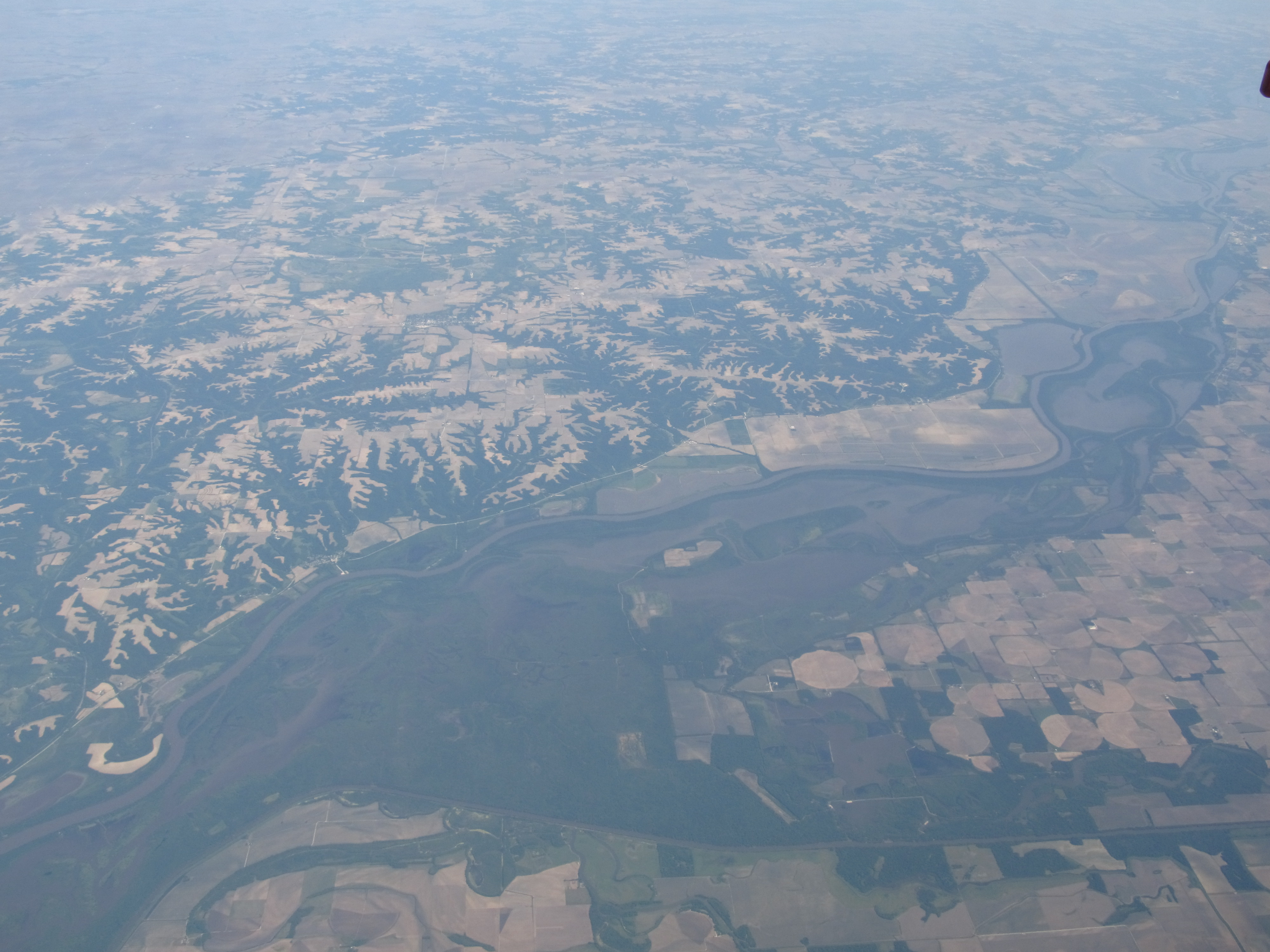
- Sanganois shown in lower left quarter of aerial photo

- Location within Illinois Location within the United States
- Location: Cass, Schuyler, and Mason County, Illinois, USA
- Nearest city: Chandlerville, Illinois
- Coordinates: 40°06′33″N 90°20′00″W
- Area: 10,360 acres (4,190 ha)
- Established: 1948
- Governing body: Illinois Department of Natural Resources

Sanganois State Fish and Wildlife Area is an Illinois state park on 10,360 acres (4,190 ha) in Cass, Schuyler, and Mason County, Illinois, United States.

== History ==
Sanganois is a bottomland area with sloughs, backwater lakes, and timbered ponds. It is near the confluence of the Sangamon River and Illinois River.; the original confluence of the meandering Sangamon River channel and the Illinois River is contained within the Sanganois Conservation Area. The area is located in southwestern Mason County, northwestern Cass County, and a small portion in Schuyler County.

The area was first owned and operated as private duck clubs. Sanganois Gun Club was the largest club with 2,700 acres (1,100 ha) was purchased by the State of Illinois in 1948. The state has purchased additional acreage to expand over the years, including the new addition of Stewart Lake. Today the Sanganois State Fish and Wildlife Area contains over 10,000 acres (4,000 ha), of which roughly 1,700 acres (690 ha) is water.

== Flora ==
Sanganois contains bottomland timber with willow, maple, and cottonwood trees.

== Fauna ==
Sanganois contains waterfowl refuges, such as Barkhausen Refuge, Ash Swale Waterfowl Refuge, and Marion-Pickerel Waterfowl Refuge.

Sanganois is listed as an Important Birding Area by the Audubon Society. Tens of thousands of migratory waterfowl, including ducks, American white pelican, tundra swans, and trumpeter swans, use the site. Migratory shorebirds use the lakes when they are shallow, including species like pectoral sandpipers, least sandpipers, lesser yellowlegs, greater yellowlegs, semipalmated plover, semipalmated sandpiper, and dunlin. When the floodplain lakes have deeper water levels, gulls, terns, and ducks make their home. Other birds that nest on the site include: brown creeper, lark sparrow, blue grosbeak, western meadowlark, Eurasian tree sparrow, Bewick's wren, and bald eagles.

== Recreation ==
=== Hunting ===
There are approximately 60 waterfowl blind sites, 7,000 acres (2,800 ha) huntable acres, and approximately 500 acres (200 ha) that are open to walk-in hunting. Youth hunting events are available during hunting season.

Visitors are encouraged to check in to ensure the site is open to access and to avoid this site during waterfowl and deer hunting seasons, but birders may hike an unpaved road around Knapps Island or the levee.
