= Clear Creek (Illinois) =

Watercourse in Illinois, United States

Clear Creek is a southern Illinois watercourse that rises in Jackson County and Union County, and discharges into the Mississippi River in Alexander County.

== Upper and lower halves ==
Clear Creek is neatly divided by the bluffs of the Mississippi into two sections: nearer its headwaters it is a relatively clean and swift-flowing hill river, and in its lower half, below the bluff, it has become a channelized ditch, the Clear Creek Ditch (coordinates: 37.391716°N 89.353143°W). Clear Creek rises in the uplands of the Shawnee Hills near Cobden, Illinois. In its upper reaches, Clear Creek is an unusually clean and undisturbed stream for Illinois, as its watershed includes two of the largest wilderness areas in Illinois, Bald Knob Wilderness and Clear Springs Wilderness. Another section of the creek's watershed is protected by the Trail of Tears State Forest, and most of the remainder of the watershed is protected by the non-wilderness parcels of Shawnee National Forest.

West of Jonesboro, Illinois, Clear Creek descends from the Shawnee Hills into the bottomland of the Mississippi River. In historical times, the stream fed a ribbon-shaped wetland that ran southward and parallel to the Mississippi River for approximately 15 miles (24 km) before discharging into a former watercourse of the main river, the Picayune Chute, east of Cape Girardeau, Missouri. Part of this wetland has been conserved as the Union County State Fish and Wildlife Area, but during the 20th century most of it was extensively ditched and drained for mosquito abatement and to promote agriculture. Engineers dug a ditch that carries Clear Creek's drainage southward a further eight miles (13 km) and takes in further runoff from adjacent Shawnee Hills creeks. The creek/ditch currently discharges into the Mississippi close to Thebes, Illinois.
