= Sam Dale Lake State Fish and Wildlife Area =

State park in Illinois, United States

- IUCN category IV (habitat/species management area)
- Location within Illinois Location within the United States
- Location: Wayne County, Illinois, U.S.
- Nearest city: Johnsonville, Illinois
- Coordinates: 38°32′35″N 88°35′07″W
- Area: 1,302 acres (527 ha)
- Established: 1959
- Governing body: Illinois Department of Natural Resources

Sam Dale Lake State Fish and Wildlife Area is an Illinois state park on 1,302 acres (527 ha) in Wayne County, Illinois, United States. It is named for Sam Dale, a representative in the Illinois State House and former superintendent.

Sam Dale Lake is a small reservoir with an area of 194 acres (79 ha), a maximum depth of 18 feet (5.5 m) and a normal elevation of 463 feet (141 m).
