= Mautino =

Mautino is a surname. Notable people with the name include:

- Frank Mautino (born 1962), currently Illinois' Auditor General
- Fred Mautino (born 1936), American football player
- Giorgio Mautino (born 1961), retired Peruan sprinter
- Paola Mautino (born 1990), Peruvian athlete (long jump and sprinting events)
- Richard Mautino (1938–1991), American politician

== See also ==
- Mautino Peak, west of Packard Glacier in the Saint Johns Range, Victoria Land
- Mautino State Fish and Wildlife Area, Illinois state park in Bureau County, Illinois, United States
- Gimar Montaz Mautino (GMM), French aerial lift manufacturer created by the merger of Gimar and Montaz-Mautino
