= Carlyle Lake State Fish and Wildlife Area =

State park in Illinois, US

- IUCN category IV (habitat/species management area)
- Location within Illinois Location within the United States
- Location: Fayette County, Illinois, USA
- Nearest city: Vandalia, Illinois
- Coordinates: 38°46′40″N 89°13′37″W
- Area: 37,000 acres (14,973 ha)
- Established: 1966
- Governing body: Illinois Department of Natural Resources

Carlyle Lake State Fish and Wildlife Area is an Illinois state park on 37,000 acres (14,973 ha) in Fayette County, Illinois, United States.
