= Franklin Creek State Natural Area =

State park in Illinois, USA

- IUCN category III (natural monument or feature)
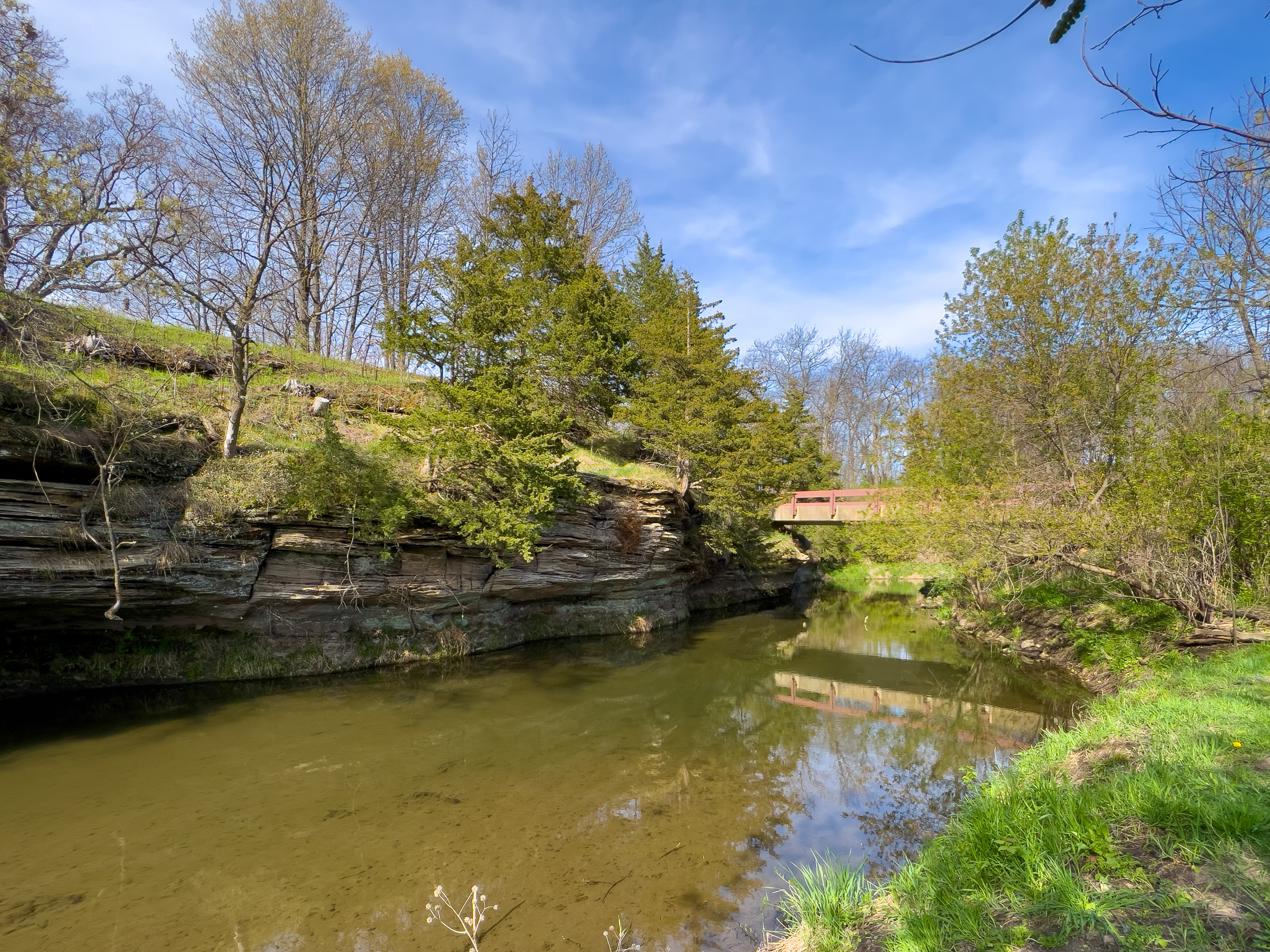
- Twist Road bridge over Franklin Creek, Franklin Creek State Natural Area, Lee County, Illinois, April 2025

- Location within Illinois Location within the United States
- Location: Lee County, Illinois, USA
- Nearest city: Franklin Grove, Illinois
- Coordinates: 41°50′59″N 89°20′09″W
- Area: 664 acres (269 ha)
- Established: 1970
- Governing body: Illinois Department of Natural Resources

Franklin Creek State Natural Area is an Illinois state park on 882 acres (357 ha) in Lee County, Illinois, United States. Franklin Creek State Natural Area was dedicated in 1982, making it the 24th nature preserve in Illinois.

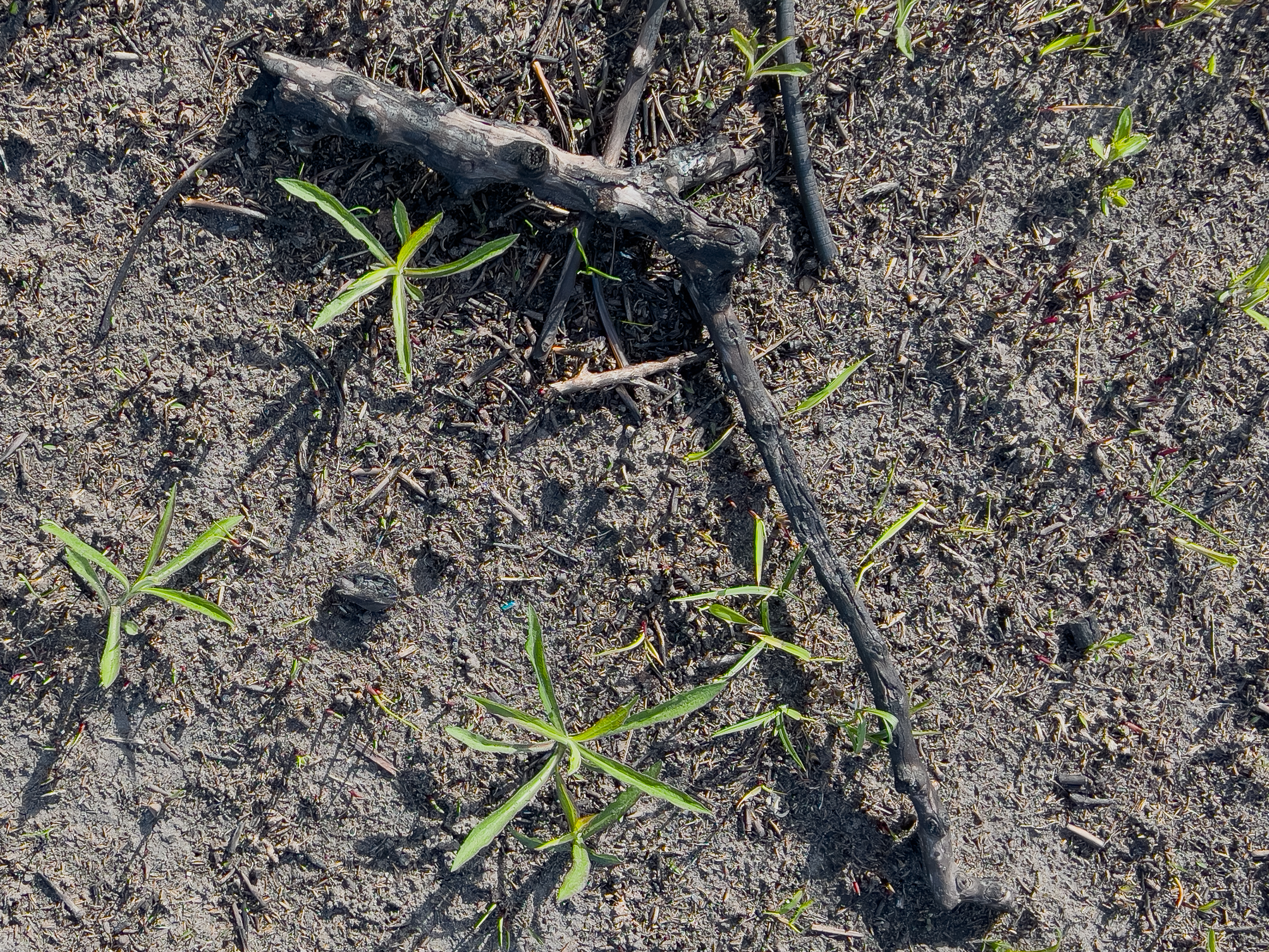
New growth after controlled burn, April 2025
