= Donnelley/Depue State Park =

State park in Putnam County, Illinois

Donnelley/Depue State Fish and Wildlife Area
- IUCN category III (natural monument or feature)
- Location within Illinois Location within the United States
- Location: Putnam County, Illinois, USA
- Nearest city: Depue, Illinois
- Coordinates: 41°17′25″N 89°19′57″W
- Area: 3,015 acres (1,220 ha)
- Established: 1982
- Governing body: Illinois Department of Natural Resources

Donnelley/Depue State Fish and Wildlife Area is an Illinois state park on 3,015 acres (1,220 ha) in Putnam County, Illinois, United States.
