= Wolf Creek State Park =

State park in Shelby County, Illinois

- IUCN category III (natural monument or feature)
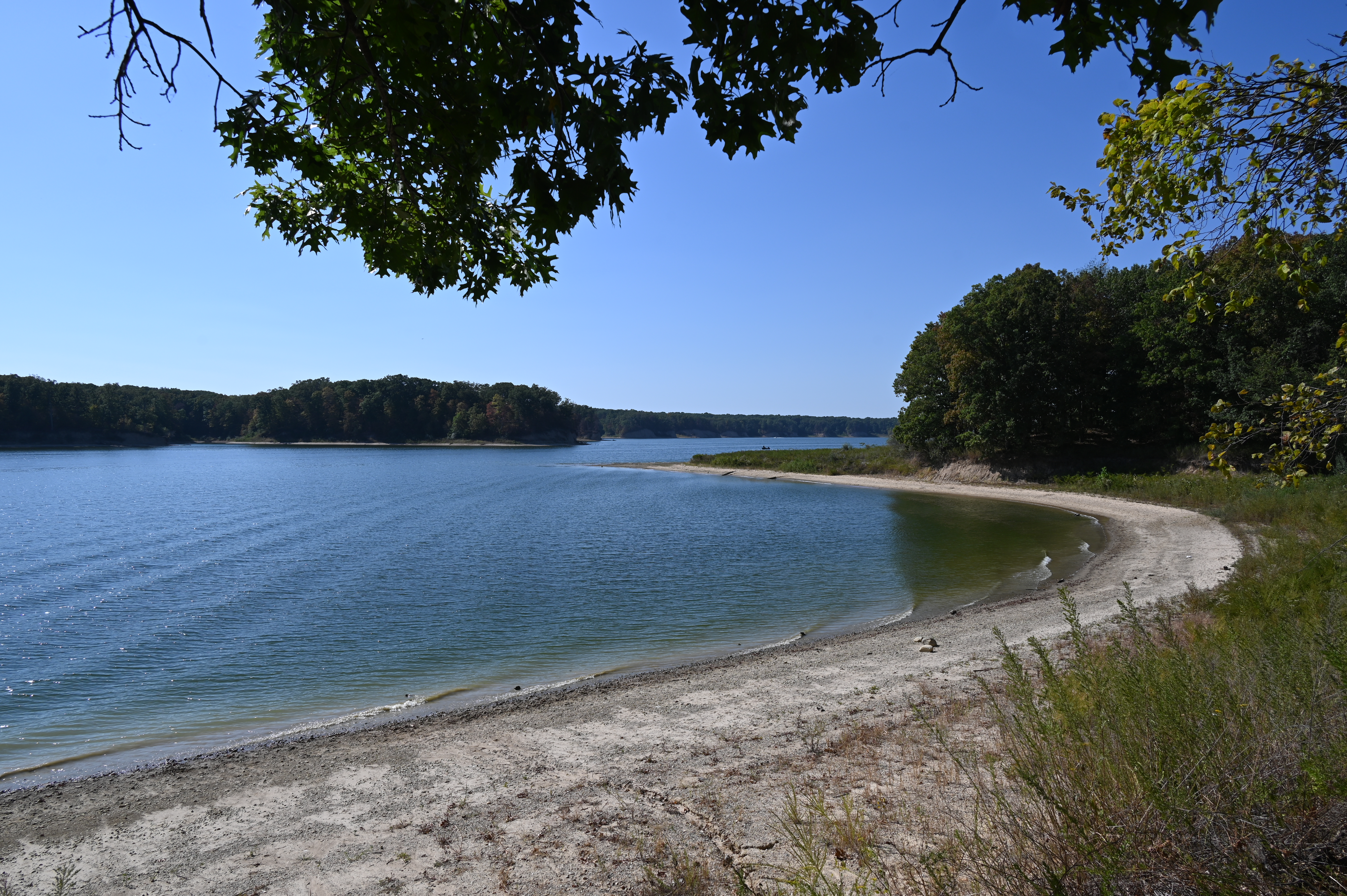

- Location within Illinois Location within the United States
- Location: Shelby County, Illinois, United States
- Nearest city: Windsor, Illinois
- Coordinates: 39°28′45″N 88°41′15″W
- Area: 25,300 acres (10,200 ha)
- Established: 1968
- Governing body: Illinois Department of Natural Resources

Wolf Creek State Park is an Illinois state park on 25,300 acres (10,200 ha) in Shelby County, Illinois, United States.

It is located on the east side of Lake Shelbyville. It has 304 Class A campsites with restrooms and showers, electricity and picnic tables. There are also two family tent camping areas, an organized group camp, and an equestrian campground. There is also one cabin available for rent.

== 2008 closing and reopening ==
Wolf Creek State Park was one of eleven state parks slated to close indefinitely on November 1, 2008, due to budget cuts by then-Illinois Governor Rod Blagojevich. After delay, which restored funding for some of the parks, a proposal to close seven state parks and a dozen state historic sites, including Wolf Creek State Park, went ahead on November 30, 2008. After the impeachment of Illinois Governor Blagojevich, new governor Pat Quinn reopened the closed state parks in February. In March 2009 Quinn announced he is committed to reopening the state historic sites by June 30, 2009.

== General references ==
- "Wolf Creek State Park". Illinois Department of Natural Resources.
- USGS. "Wolf Creek State Park, USGS Middlesworth (IL) Quad". TopoQuest.
