= Sam Parr State Fish and Wildlife Area =

State park in Illinois, United States

- IUCN category IV (habitat/species management area)
- Location within Illinois Location within the United States
- Location: Jasper County, Illinois, USA
- Nearest city: Newton, Illinois
- Coordinates: 39°01′15″N 88°07′15″W
- Area: 1,180 acres (480 ha)
- Established: 1960
- Governing body: Illinois Department of Natural Resources

Sam Parr State Fish and Wildlife Area is an Illinois state park on 1,180 acres (480 ha) in Jasper County, Illinois, United States.
