= Kinkaid Lake State Fish and Wildlife Area =

State park in Illinois, USA

- IUCN category IV (habitat/species management area)
- Location within Illinois Location within the United States
- Location: Jackson County, Illinois, USA
- Nearest city: Murphysboro, Illinois
- Coordinates: 37°46′40″N 89°27′14″W
- Area: 11,750 acres (4,755 ha)
- Established: 1968
- Governing body: Illinois Department of Natural Resources

Kinkaid Lake State Fish and Wildlife Area is an Illinois state park on 11,750 acres (4,755 ha) in Jackson County, Illinois, United States.
