= Giant City State Park =

State park in Illinois, USA

- IUCN category V (protected landscape/seascape)
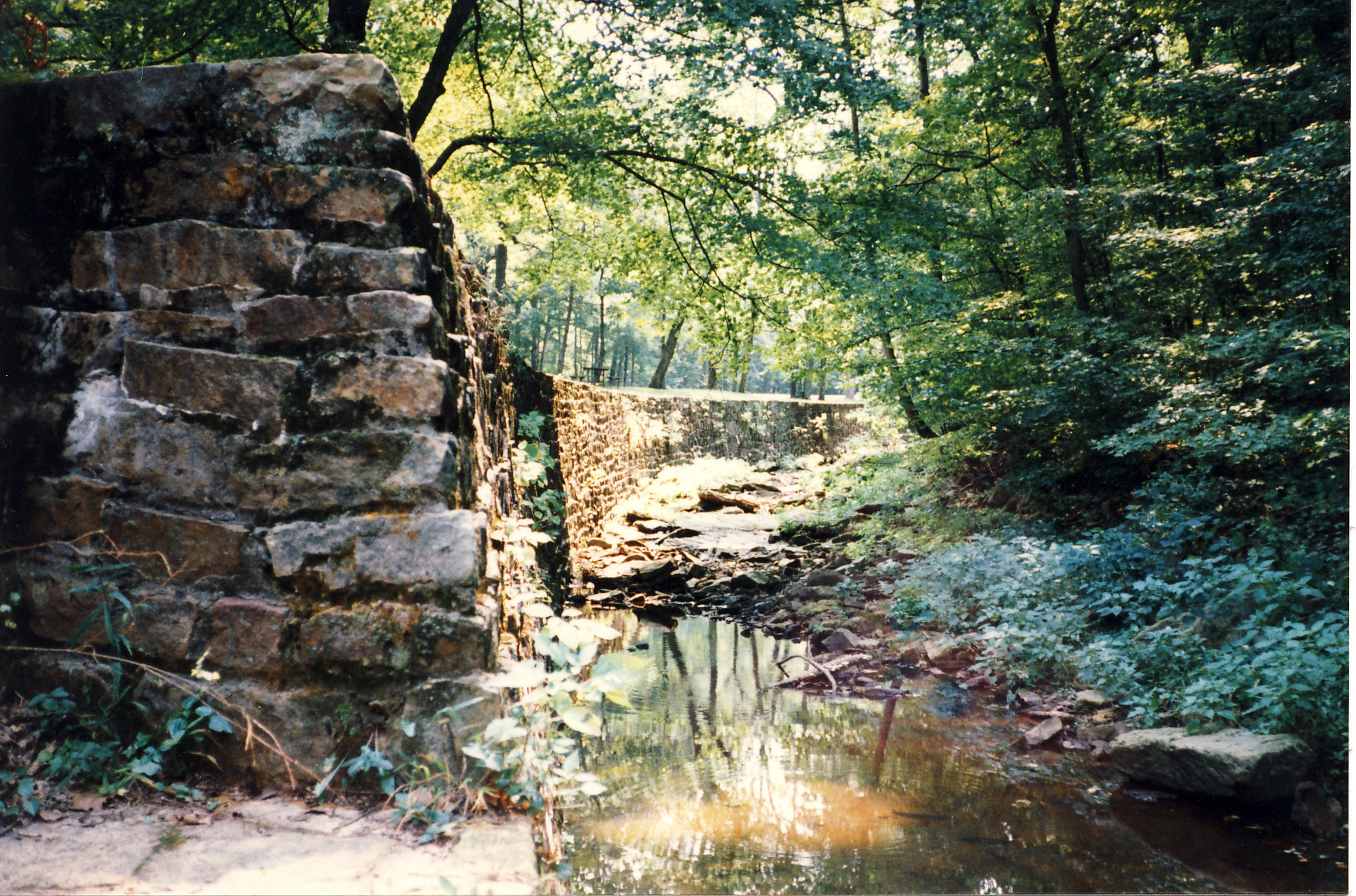

- Location within Illinois Location within the United States
- Location: Jackson and Union Counties, Illinois, USA
- Nearest city: Makanda, Illinois
- Coordinates: 37°36′18″N 89°11′18″W
- Area: 4,000 acres (1,619 ha)
- Established: 1927
- Governing body: Illinois Department of Natural Resources

U.S. National Natural Landmark
- Designated: 1980

Giant City State Park is an Illinois state park on 4,000 acres (1,619 ha) in Jackson and Union Counties, Illinois, United States. Illinois acquired more than 1,100 acres (450 ha) in 1927, and dedicated the park as Giant City State Park. A lodge and visitor center welcome state park guests.

Giant City State Park is a popular destination in Southern Illinois, and visitors to the park enjoy a number of activities such as hiking, horseback riding, picnicking, and rock climbing. Some of the park's most popular hiking trails include Giant City Nature Trail, Red Cedar Trail, and Trillium Trail. The park is served by the River to River Trail.

The park's lodge and original six cabins were constructed by the 696th Company of the Civilian Conservation Corps from 1934 to 1935. The CCC used locally quarried sandstone and locally harvested lumber to build the lodge. In 1936, the lodge and cabins were dedicated by Illinois Governor Henry Horner. The CCC later added a dining room and kitchen as well as six additional cabins to the complex. They were also responsible for building the lodge's furniture; the quality of the wooden furniture led Pere Marquette State Park to commission the 696th Company to furnish their lodge as well. In 1985, the lodge and cabins were added to the National Register of Historic Places; the original cabins were demolished and replaced by replica cabins in the same year, and several new cabins were constructed. The new cabins are used to lodge visitors to the park, while the lodge houses a restaurant and gift shop.

This state park is a National Natural Landmark. The Giant City Stone Fort Site, a prehistoric stone fort located within the park, is listed on the National Register of Historic Places.
