= Hamilton County State Fish and Wildlife Area =

State Fish and Wildlife Area in Hamilton County, Illinois

- IUCN category IV (habitat/species management area)
- Location within Illinois Location within the United States
- Location: Hamilton County, Illinois, USA
- Nearest city: McLeansboro, Illinois
- Coordinates: 38°03′25″N 88°23′45″W
- Area: 1,683 acres (681 ha)
- Established: 1962
- Governing body: Illinois Department of Natural Resources

Hamilton County State Fish and Wildlife Area is an Illinois state park on 1,683 acres (681 ha) in Hamilton County, Illinois, United States.
