= Turkey Bluffs State Fish and Wildlife Area =

State park in Illinois, USA

- IUCN category IV (habitat/species management area)
- Location within Illinois Location within the United States
- Location: Randolph County, Illinois, United States
- Nearest city: Chester, Illinois
- Coordinates: 37°58′20″N 89°48′15″W
- Area: 2,264 acres (916 ha)
- Governing body: Illinois Department of Natural Resources

Turkey Bluffs State Fish and Wildlife Area is an Illinois state park on 2,264 acres (916 ha) in Randolph County, Illinois, United States.
