= Illini State Park =

Illinois state park on the Illinois River

- IUCN category III (natural monument or feature)
- Location within Illinois Location within the United States
- Location: LaSalle County, Illinois, USA
- Nearest city: Marseilles, Illinois
- Coordinates: 41°19′18″N 88°42′57″W
- Area: 510 acres (206 ha)
- Established: 1934
- Governing body: Illinois Department of Natural Resources

Illini State Park is an Illinois state park on 510 acres (206 ha) in LaSalle County, Illinois, United States. In 1934, Illini entered into the state park system, and was dedicated a year later in 1935. The Department of Natural Resources closed the park from November 2008 to February 2009 due to budget cuts.

== 2008 closing ==
Illini State Park was one of eleven state parks slated to close indefinitely on November 1, 2008, due to budget cuts by then-Illinois Governor Rod Blagojevich. After delay, which restored funding for some of the parks, a proposal to close seven state parks and a dozen state historic sites, including Illini State Park, went ahead on November 30, 2008. After the impeachment of Illinois Governor Blagojevich, new governor Pat Quinn reopened the closed state parks in February. In March 2009 Quinn announced he is committed to reopening the state historic sites by June 30, 2009.
