= Devils Island Wildlife Management Area =

State park in Illinois, USA

- IUCN category IV (habitat/species management area)
- Interactive map of Devils Island Wildlife Management Area
- Location: Alexander County, Illinois; Union County, Illinois
- Nearest city: Jonesboro, Illinois
- Coordinates: 37.327°N 89.434°W
- Area: 2,741 acres (11.09 km^{2})
- Governing body: Illinois Department of Natural Resources
- Website: dnr.illinois.gov/parks/park.devils-island.html

Devils Island Wildlife Management Area is a 2,741-acre (11.1 km^{2}) parcel of semi-protected Mississippi River bottomland habitat within Alexander County and Union County in the U.S. state of Illinois.

== Description ==
Devils Island Wildlife Management Area is managed as public access for hunting. It is managed, coterminously with the Union County State Fish and Wildlife Area, by the Illinois Department of Natural Resources from a full-time office in nearby Jonesboro. The park is made up of bottomland, hardwood forest lands, and agricultural fields. IDNR reports the practice of continuous habitat management on the site.
