= Mazonia/Braidwood State Fish and Wildlife Area =

State park in Illinois, USA

- IUCN category IV (habitat/species management area)
- Location within Illinois Location within the United States
- Location: Grundy County, Illinois, USA
- Nearest city: Braceville, Illinois
- Coordinates: 41°11′51″N 88°16′15″W
- Area: 1,017 acres (412 ha)
- Established: 1981
- Governing body: Illinois Department of Natural Resources

Mazonia/Braidwood State Fish and Wildlife Area is an Illinois state park on 1,017 acres (412 ha) in Grundy County, Illinois, United States.
