= Randolph County State Recreation Area =

State park in Illinois, United States

- IUCN category V (protected landscape/seascape)
- Location within Illinois Location within the United States
- Location: Randolph County, Illinois, USA
- Nearest city: Chester, Illinois
- Coordinates: 37°58′39″N 89°48′02″W
- Area: 1,101 acres (446 ha)
- Established: 1958
- Governing body: Illinois Department of Natural Resources

Randolph County State Recreation Area is an Illinois state park on 1,101 acres (446 ha) in Randolph County, Illinois, United States.
