= Ten Mile Creek State Fish and Wildlife Area =

State park in Illinois

- IUCN category IV (habitat/species management area)
- Location within Illinois Location within the United States
- Location: Hamilton and Jefferson Counties, Illinois, United States
- Nearest city: McLeansboro, Illinois
- Coordinates: 38°06′N 88°37′W
- Area: 6,000 acres (2,400 ha)
- Established: 1988
- Governing body: Illinois Department of Natural Resources

Ten Mile Creek State Fish and Wildlife Area is an Illinois state park on 6,000 acres (2,400 ha) in Hamilton and Jefferson Counties, Illinois, United States.
