= Red Hills State Park =

State park in Lawrence County, Illinois

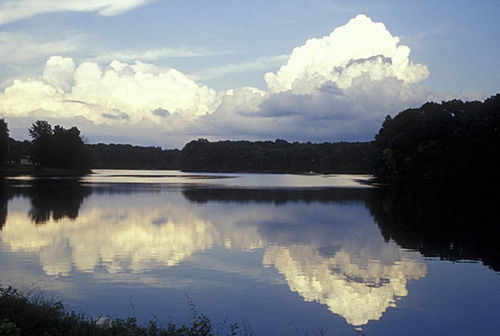
- Red Hills State Park

- Location within Illinois
- Location: Lawrence County, Illinois, United States
- Coordinates: 38°43′47″N 87°50′08″W
- Area: 967 acres (391 ha)
- Elevation: 515 ft (157 m)
- Established: 1953
- Named for: the Red Hills
- Governing body: Illinois Department of Natural Resources
- Website: dnr.state.il.us/lands/Landmgt/PARKS/R5/REDHLS.HTM

Red Hills State Park is an Illinois state park on 967 acres (391 ha) in Lawrence County, Illinois, United States. The park sits at an elevation of 515 feet (157 m). Red Hills State Park is open for year-round recreation including boating, fishing, hunting, hiking and various winter sports. The park includes a restaurant which is open year-round and has banquet facilities.

== History ==
Red Hills State Park is in southeastern Illinois in Lawrence County. The county borders the state of Indiana to the east. This part of Illinois was once part of the Vincennes Tract, a tract of land that was ceded to the United States of America in 1795 by Native Americans. The Natives lost a series of battles to General Anthony Wayne. The treaty was signed in Greenville. The Treaty of Greeneville was signed by a number of tribes known as the Western Confederacy. The tribes in the confederacy included the Wyandot, Lenape, Shawnee, Odawa, Ojibwe, Potawatomi, Miami, Wea, Kickapoo and Kaskaskia. The natives agreed to relinquish their claim to land that was north of the Ohio River and east of an established line. That line passes through what is now Red Hills State Park. The area grew following a series of wars and treaties and came to be known as the Northwest Territory and comprised what is now the states of Ohio, Indiana, Michigan, Illinois, Wisconsin and part of Minnesota.

Following the forced removal of the Native Americans, the area was open to settlement by Euro-American settlers from the original Thirteen Colonies. The land that is now Red Hills State Park was divided by an old wagon road known as Old Cahokia Trace, more commonly known as Trace Road. The road was the main route from Vincennes, Indiana to St. Louis, Missouri.

The establishment of Red Hill State Park coincided with the construction of a dam and reservoir on Muddy Creek. The dam was completed and the park opened in 1953. The creek is a main tributary of the Embarras River. Red Hills Lake is 40 acres (16 ha) with a maximum depth of 30 feet (9.1 m). The lake has 2.5 miles (4.0 km) of shoreline. The park has expanded over the years to include many facilities that are typical of a state park including picnic areas, boat ramps, trails and campgrounds.

The dam at Red Hills Lake State Park was damaged by the 2008 Illinois earthquake. Engineers feared that the dam could collapsed and cause flooding downstream. The decision was made to drain the lake for repairs in December 2008. The dam was repaired in 2009 and the lake has been restocked with fish.

== Ecology ==
Red Hills State Park is on the Embarras River which is a tributary of the Wabash River which in turn flows into the Ohio River as part of the Mississippi River drainage area. The park is on the Red Hills which are the highest bits of land between Cincinnati and St. Louis. There is a 120 feet (37 m) tower atop the Red Hills that provides for scenic viewing of the area. The area comprises a variety of ecosystems including dry and wet prairies, wooded hills, ravines, meadows, and wetlands along the river and lake. The park is bisected by U.S. Route 50. The areas north of the highway are deciduous woods and the areas south of the highway are scattered woods with plots of a grains, clover and grassy prairies.

== Recreation ==
Red Hills State Park is open for year-round recreation. There are shaded picnic areas spread throughout the park and three picnic pavilions. The park has more than 100 campsites that have access to modern restroom facilities, electric hook-ups and a dumping station for chemical toilets. One cabin is available to rent. There are 8 miles (13 km) of trails in the park that are open to hiking, horseback riding and, in the winter months, cross-country skiing. Additionally that park as volleyball and basketball courts.

The park is open to hunting and fishing. The lake is surrounded by a paved road that provides access to the lake for fishing from the bank. Boats are permitted on the lake, but they must be battery or human powered. Common game fish include bluegill, crappie, largemouth bass and channel catfish. Ice fishing is permitted when the lake is frozen and the ice is thick enough to allow safe access. Common game animals that may be legally hunted at the park are white-tailed deer, quail, woodcocks, doves, wild turkeys and rabbits. Deer must be taken with a bow. Hunting deer with guns is prohibited. Gun hunting for the other wildlife is permissible.
