= Heidecke Lake State Fish and Wildlife Area =

State park in Illinois, USA

- IUCN category IV (habitat/species management area)
- Location within Illinois Location within the United States
- Location: Grundy County, Illinois, U.S.
- Nearest city: Morris, Illinois
- Coordinates: 41°22′00″N 88°20′09″W
- Area: 1,300 acres (526 ha)
- Elevation: 495 feet (151 m)
- Established: 1978
- Governing body: Illinois Department of Natural Resources
- Website: www2.illinois.gov/dnr/Parks/Pages/HeideckeLake.aspx

Heidecke Lake State Fish and Wildlife Area is an Illinois state park on 1,300 acres (526 ha) in Grundy County, Illinois, United States. It is an artificial cooling pond originally excavated to enable the operation of the now defunct Collins Generating Station.
