= Eagle Creek State Park (Illinois) =

State park in Shelby County, Illinois

- IUCN category V (protected landscape/seascape)
- Location within Illinois Location within the United States
- Location: Shelby County, Illinois, USA
- Nearest city: Findlay, Illinois
- Coordinates: 39°29′05″N 88°42′35″W
- Area: 11,100 acres (4,492 ha)
- Established: May 1963
- Governing body: Illinois Department of Natural Resources

Eagle Creek State Park is an Illinois state park on 11,100 acres (4,492 ha) on Lake Shelbyville in Shelby County, Illinois, United States.
