= Nauvoo State Park =

State park in Hancock County, Illinois

- IUCN category III (natural monument or feature)
- Location within Illinois Location within the United States
- Location: Hancock County, Illinois, United States
- Nearest city: Nauvoo, Illinois
- Coordinates: 40°32′39″N 91°22′51″W
- Area: 148 acres (60 ha)
- Governing body: Illinois Department of Natural Resources

Nauvoo State Park is an Illinois state park on 148 acres (60 ha) in Hancock County, Illinois, United States near the banks of the Mississippi River. It contains 13-acre manmade lake named Lake Horton, the Rheinberger House Museum, and Illinois’ oldest vineyard.

== Flora and fauna ==
Lake Horton is stocked with largemouth bass, channel catfish, and bluegill. Deer, skunks, opossum, and raccoon are among the native animals. Birds include cardinals, goldfinches, geese, ducks, and wood ducks.

== Recreation ==
Fishing and boating are available on Lake Horton. Hiking and cross-country skiing are allowed on two of the park's trails.

=== Museum ===
The Nauvoo State Park Museum is a house built by Mormons in the 1840s, remodeled by Icarians, and later owned by the Rheinberger family from 1850 to 1948. It has been staffed as a museum by the Nauvoo Historical Society since 1954. The restored home features a stone-arched wine cellar and a press room, and is the only Nauvoo wine cellar open to the public. This also is the location of Nauvoo's first vineyard, a 3-acre concord grape vineyard planted in 1851 which has been producing grapes since the mid-1800s. The museum itself exhibits artifacts from all periods of Nauvoo's history, including Native American, German, Mormon, Icarian, Civil War, and other artifacts.
