= Pekin Lake State Fish and Wildlife Area =

State park in Illinois, United States

- Pekin Lake Conservation Area
- IUCN category IV (habitat/species management area)
- Location within Illinois Location within the United States
- Nearest city: Pekin, Illinois
- Coordinates: 40°36′02″N 89°38′52″W
- Area: 1,181 acres (478 ha)
- Elevation: 440 ft (130 m)
- Governing body: Illinois Department of Natural Resources
- Website: www2.illinois.gov/dnr/hunting/FactSheets/Pages/PekinLake.aspx

Pekin Lake State Fish and Wildlife Area is a 1,181-acre area of protected habitat on the Illinois River adjacent to the city of Pekin, Illinois, within Tazewell County in the U.S. state of Illinois. The Illinois Department of Natural Resources (IDNR) describes the protected area as a bottomland of sloughs, lakes, and low timbered ridges.

== Description ==
As a riparian ecosystem area, the entire Fish and Wildlife Area is subject to frequent and repeated river flooding. The IDNR manages the Wildlife Area for outdoor sports experiences, especially the licensed hunting of deer and waterfowl. Licensed trapping of furbearing small mammals, such as beaver and muskrat, is also allowed. Trapping rights, and the right to use specific hunting sites within the Wildlife Area, are awarded by an annual IDNR draw.

Pekin, Illinois is a historic location of wetland hunting and fur trapping, and to this day the Wildlife Area protects waterlogged land used for this purpose—although the Wildlife Area and its riverine lakes have changed a great deal from pioneer days. The Wildlife Area contains two ribbon lakes that parallel the Illinois River, Pekin Lake and Worley Lake. Artificial causeways draw harsh lines over the soft, muddy curves of the lakes and wetlands, including a causeway carrying the right-of-way for a high-tension electric line. The high-voltage line serves the E.D. Edwards Power Plant, a “green battery” plant, across the river. The Wildlife Area is managed as a disjunct site of the Spring Lake State Fish and Wildlife Area, a separate hunting preserve located near Manito, Illinois.
