= Iroquois County State Wildlife Area =

State park in Illinois, U.S.

- IUCN category V (protected landscape/seascape)
- Location within Illinois Location within the United States
- Location: Iroquois County, Illinois, United States
- Nearest city: Beaverville, Illinois
- Coordinates: 40°59′17″N 87°34′10″W
- Area: 2,480 acres (1,004 ha)
- Established: 1944
- Governing body: Illinois Department of Natural Resources

The Iroquois County State Wildlife Area is an Illinois state park that occupies 2,480 acres (1,004 ha) in northeastern Iroquois County, near the border with Indiana. The nearest municipality is Beaverville, Illinois, and the nearest exit on a limited-access highway is Exit 302 on Interstate 57 (Chebanse, Illinois).

== Ecology ==
The Iroquois County State Wildlife Area is a surviving remnant of the Great Kankakee Swamp, a 5,300 sq mi (14,000 km^{2}) expanse of wetland that once drained the slow-flowing Kankakee River valley. The glacial melt episode that marked the conclusion of the Wisconsonian glaciation washed a fan of sand, silt, and sediments westward from Northwest Indiana into Northeastern Illinois, and this outwash plain, which remained damp or wet year-round, became the home of a significant quantity of habitat-specific wetland plants and insects.

== History ==
The Kankakee Swamp wetlands were the home of many beaver and other fur-bearing mammals, which led to the nearby locality being incorporated as the municipality of Beaverville. The nearby towns of Chebanse and St. Anne pay tribute to the area's French-Canadian fur-trading heritage.

During the great drainage of the Kankakee Swamp, starting in the late 19th century, ditches were dug all over eastern Iroquois County to drain the outwash plain. While most of the ditched land became fertile farmland, the sands of far-northeastern Iroquois County resisted profitable farming activity.

In 1944 a predecessor agency of the Illinois Department of Natural Resources (IDNR) began to acquire the land of the future Iroquois County State Wildlife Area. The population of the greater prairie chicken had crashed in Illinois, and the state hoped the flagship species could be induced to rebuild a breeding population in the new sanctuary.

== Today ==
Attempts in the 20th century to reintroduce the greater prairie chicken to northeastern Iroquois County failed. State naturalists believe the wildlife area is too wet to be a good home for this species. The IDNR adaptively reused the failed prairie-chicken ground as a place to hunt whitetail deer, doves, pheasants, quail, rabbits, and squirrels. These game activities continue in their respective hunting seasons.

The Iroquois County State Wildlife Area is today a mosaic of sand dunes, wetland, grassland, and woodland habitats. Dry sand ridges are dominated by black oak savanna and woodland, while lower lying areas range from dry prairie to marsh, depending on soil moisture. The northeastern portion of the wildlife area is Hooper Branch Savanna Nature Preserve, the largest single tract of oak savanna remaining in Illinois. The dominant oak tree is the black oak, often found on relatively infertile, sandy ground. Prairie forbs include the blazing star and hairy puccoon.

== See also ==
- Willow Slough Fish and Wildlife Area, a nearby state park across the line in Indiana
