= Cape Bend State Fish and Wildlife Area =

State park in Illinois, USA

- IUCN category IV (habitat/species management area)
- Interactive map of Cape Bend State Fish and Wildlife Area
- Location: Alexander County, Illinois
- Nearest city: Jonesboro, Illinois
- Coordinates: 37.272°N 89.451°W
- Governing body: Illinois Department of Natural Resources
- Website: dnr.illinois.gov/parks/park.cape-bend.html

Cape Bend State Fish and Wildlife Area is a 1,380-acre (5.6 km^{2}) parcel of semi-protected Mississippi River bottomland habitat within Alexander County in the U.S. state of Illinois.

== Description ==
Cape Bend State Fish and Wildlife Area is managed as public access for hunting. It is managed, coterminously with the Union County State Fish and Wildlife Area, by the Illinois Department of Natural Resources from a full-time office in nearby Jonesboro. The park is made up of bottomland hardwood forest lands and wetlands. Much of the hardwood woodland is made up of former crop fields that are reverting to woodland, and much of the wetlands are shallow sloughs. IDNR reports the practice of continuous habitat management on the site.
