= Horseshoe Lake (Madison County, Illinois) =

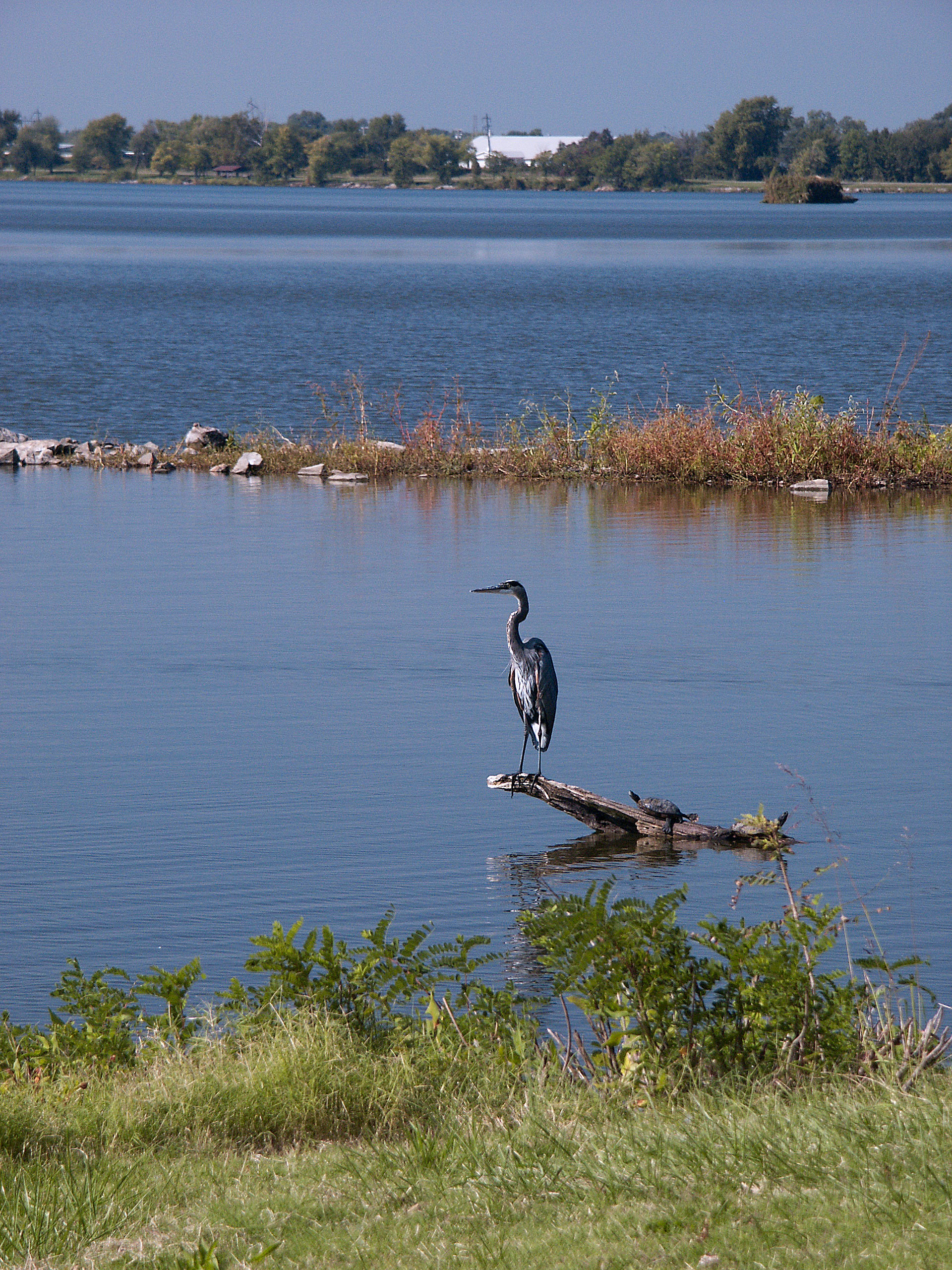

- Location within Illinois Location within the United States
- Location: Madison County, Illinois, U.S.
- Coordinates: 38°41′58″N 090°05′06″W
- Type: Oxbow lake
- Basin countries: United States
- Surface area: 2,400 acres (970 ha)
- Max. depth: 54.5 ft (16.6 m)
- Surface elevation: 403 ft (123 m)
- Settlements: Madison, Granite City
- Website: Official website

Horseshoe Lake, a National Natural Landmark, is located in the American Bottom of Illinois within the greater St. Louis metropolitan area, is 2,400 acres (10 km^{2}) in size, and is the second-largest natural lake in Illinois after Lake Michigan. An oxbow lake which is a remnant of a Mississippi River meander, the lake's elevation is 403 feet (123 m) above sea level. The lake is the site of Horseshoe Lake State Park, which is 2,960 acres (12 km^{2}) in size. The lake is bordered by the towns of Madison and Granite City. The lake is located within Nameoki Township, about four miles east of St. Louis, Missouri.

The lake is very shallow, about three feet (1 m) deep throughout most of the lake, but there is one deep spot, about 54.5 feet (16 m) deep, due to dredging for sand in years past. The lake is annually drained in part to provide habitat for shorebirds. At least 287 bird species have been found at this lake, which includes most of the species found statewide. Canada geese winter here, as well as bald eagles. Other prominent birds include the mallard duck, snowy egret and little blue heron, and the Eurasian tree sparrow, limited to this region in North America. Fish species include bluegill, sunfish, shortnose gar, spotted gar, crappie, largemouth bass and channel catfish. The western part of the lake is industrialized, dominated by the Granite City Works facility of the United States Steel Corporation.

== See also ==
- List of Illinois lakes
