= Kinkaid Lake =

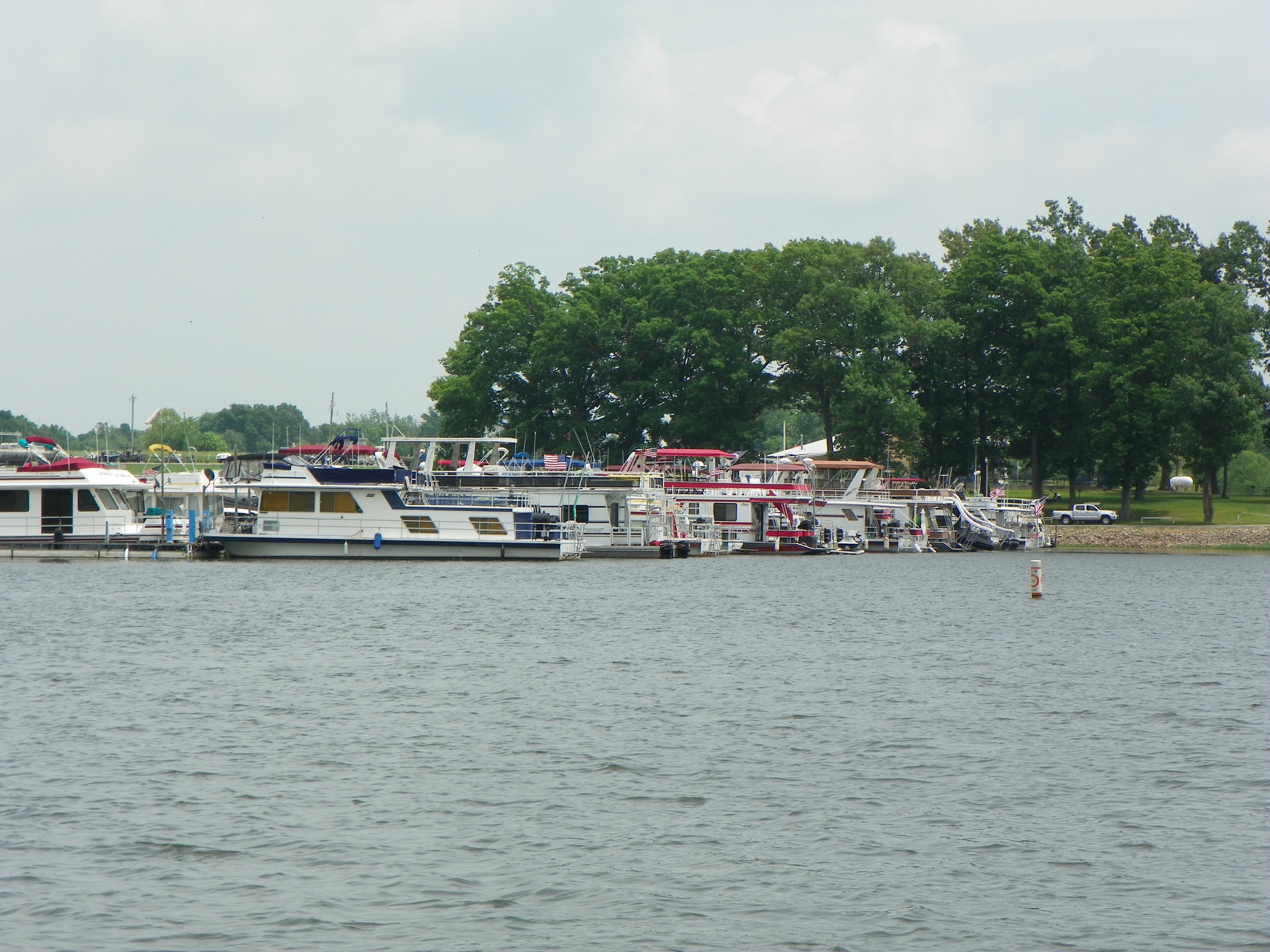
- Marina at Kinkaid Lake

- Location within Illinois Location within the United States
- Location: Jackson County, Illinois
- Coordinates: 37°47′51″N 89°25′53″W
- Type: reservoir
- Basin countries: United States
- Surface area: 2,750 acres (1,110 ha)
- Average depth: 39 ft (12 m)
- Max. depth: 80 ft (24 m)
- Shore length^{1}: 92 mi (148 km)
- Surface elevation: 420 ft (128 m)
- ^{1} Shore length is not a well-defined measure.

Kinkaid Lake is a reservoir located in southwestern Illinois. Entirely within Jackson County, the lake is approximately 5 miles (8.0 km) northwest of Murphysboro and 100 miles (160 km) southeast of St. Louis.

== History and ownership ==
Kinkaid Lake was built in 1968 with an average depth of 39 feet (12 m), although the area near the dam (on the southernmost tip) is approximately 80 feet (24 m) deep. The lake encompasses of 2,750 acres (11.1 km^{2}), which wind around the northwestern hills of Shawnee National Forest. The ownership of the surrounding land is divided among three entities; the Illinois Department of Natural Resources manages approximately 4,000 acres (16 km^{2}), while an additional 5,000 acres (20 km^{2}) are managed by the U.S. Forest Service. Kinkaid-Reed's Creek Conservancy District oversees the remaining 300 acres (1.2 km^{2}).

== Features ==
=== Natural features ===
Topography varies, from sandstone bluff formations to rolling hills surrounding the lake. In the rolling hills, oak and hickory trees predominate. Numerous flat contours are planted with prairie grasses, cool-season grasses, and wildlife food plots.

=== Camping ===
Picnic tables, shelters, charcoal grills and restroom facilities are provided at both Johnson Creek Recreation Area and Paul Ice Recreation Area. The second rest area also has playground equipment. Camping is permitted by the U.S. Forest Service, with locations at the Kinkaid-Reed's Creek Conservancy District and the Johnson Creek Recreation Area at Kinkaid Village Marina. Kinkaid Village Marina has 28 shaded RV sites with a picnic table and BBQ grill. There is also water, electric, and sewer at each site. In addition, there are over 100 campsites that can be rented on an annual basis. The marina also offers many other conveniences including: a campers store, hot showers, restaurant, free boat docks, boat sales and boat service. Camping is not permitted on any property held by the Department of Natural Resources.

=== Fishing ===
Kinkaid Lake provides opportunities for those interested in fishing for largemouth bass, bluegill, crappie, catfish, walleye and muskie types of fish. "Natural strain" muskellunges were first stocked at Kinkaid Lake in 1985, and the lake began producing fish up to 40 inches in length by 1990 (after only five years of growth).

In November 1998, construction of a spilling retention barrier was completed. This device was designed to keep the muskies in the lake (when the lake overflows into the spillway), but also offers the added benefit of keeping larger variants of walleye, bass, crappie, and striped bass from escaping.

The lake is the home of the Shawnee Chapter of Muskies Inc.

=== Hunting ===
Statewide regulations for the state of Illinois govern hunting at the Kinkaid Lake site. Within state regulations and seasons, species commonly available for hunting are deer, turkey, squirrel, quail, rabbit, dove, and waterfowl.

=== Boating ===
Four boat ramps are available to the public with a full-service marina also available. No horsepower restrictions apply at these areas, although numerous no-wake areas exist on the lake for safety and other reasons. The IDNR has recently added a 50 miles per hour (80 km/h) speed limit during the daytime and 25 miles per hour (40 km/h) speed limit at night.
