= Mautino State Fish and Wildlife Area =

State park in Illinois, USA

- IUCN category IV (habitat/species management area)
- Location within Illinois Location within the United States
- Location: Bureau County, Illinois, USA
- Nearest city: Sheffield, Illinois
- Coordinates: 41°19′23″N 89°43′08″W
- Area: 911 acres (369 ha)
- Governing body: Illinois Department of Natural Resources

Mautino State Fish and Wildlife Area is an Illinois state park on 911 acres (369 ha) in Bureau County, Illinois, United States.
