= River to River Trail =

Hiking Trail in southern Illinois

- Location within Illinois
- Nearest city: Grand Tower (west), Goreville (center west), Eddyville (center east), Elizabethtown (east)
- Coordinates: 37°29′26″N 88°54′43″W
- Governing body

River to River Trail
- Length: 162 m (531 ft)
- Location: Illinois
- Trailheads: Grand Tower, Illinois, Elizabethtown, Illinois, Battery Rock
- Use: Hiking, Equestrian
- Difficulty: Moderate
- Season: Hiking All, Equestrian May–October
- Hazards: Ticks, Rattlesnake, Copperhead Snake

The River to River Trail is a 160 mile (256 km)-long hiking trail that serves Shawnee National Forest in far southern Illinois. The trail is used by both equestrians and hikers. About half is on off-road trails. Its eastern terminus has historically been Battery Rock, overlooking the Ohio River but now generally Elizabethtown, Illinois is used as the eastern terminus. The western terminus is in Grand Tower, Illinois, at the Mississippi River. Sections of the River to River Trail form part of the Southern Section of the American Discovery Trail.

From east to west, the trail serves the following settlements and resources:

- Elizabethtown, Illinois
- Garden of the Gods Wilderness
- One Horse Gap
- Lusk Creek Wilderness
- Eddyville, Illinois
- Jackson Falls climbing area
- Tunnel Hill State Trail
- Ferne Clyffe State Park
- Panther Den Wilderness
- Crab Orchard Wilderness
- Giant City State Park
- Makanda, Illinois
- Bald Knob Wilderness
- Clear Springs Wilderness
- Grand Tower, Illinois

The River to River Trail Society has published a guidebook to the trail's campsites, orientation, safe water sources, and other useful information. A significant spur trail serves Elizabethtown, Illinois.

== Waypoints ==
Following are waypoints on the trail:

Waypoint	Coordinates
Battery Rock	37°31′45″N 88°04′47″W
IL 1	37°33′19″N 88°10′31″W
Elizabethtown	37°26′45″N 88°18′23″W
County 12	37°29′50″N 88°19′26″W
Junction E'Town & Battery Rock	37°35′36″N 88°18′22″W
Garden of the Gods Wilderness Area	37°36′09″N 88°23′02″W
Herod	37°34′49″N 88°26′11″W
One Horse Gap	37°31′03″N 88°27′31″W
Lusk Creek	37°31′31″N 88°33′01″W
Eddyville	37°30′03″N 88°35′11″W
Bay Creek / Millstone Bluff	37°29′02″N 88°41′29″W
US 45	37°29′14″N 88°50′34″W
Tunnel Hill State Trail	37°29′37″N 88°52′16″W
Interstate 24	37°29′26″N 88°53′41″W
Dutchman Lake	37°28′52″N 88°56′41″W
IL 37	37°31′29″N 88°57′56″W
Goreville / Ferne Clyffe State Park	37°32′55″N 88°58′45″W
Interstate 57	37°33′21″N 89°01′58″W
Panther Den Wilderness	37°34′58″N 89°05′17″W
Giant City State Park	37°35′32″N 89°10′58″W
Makanda	37°37′04″N 89°12′34″W
US 51	37°36′38″N 89°14′01″W
Cedar Lake	37°36′46″N 89°17′21″W
Alto Pass	37°34′13″N 89°19′04″W
Bald Knob Wilderness	37°34′08″N 89°21′41″W
Clear Springs Wilderness	37°35′27″N 89°26′22″W
Big Muddy River / IL 3	37°33′43″N 89°28′19″W
Devils Backbone Park / Grand Tower	37°38′20″N 89°30′39″W

== External Map and Hiking Journal Links ==
- River to River Trail Society
- Hiking Project Downloadable gpx from 2017.
- Full trail on OpenStreetmap.org
- Full trail downloadable GPX at Way Marked Trails
- Trail Journals for River to River Trail
- Trail Run Project
