= Horseshoe Lake State Park =

State park in Madison County, Illinois

- IUCN category III (natural monument or feature)
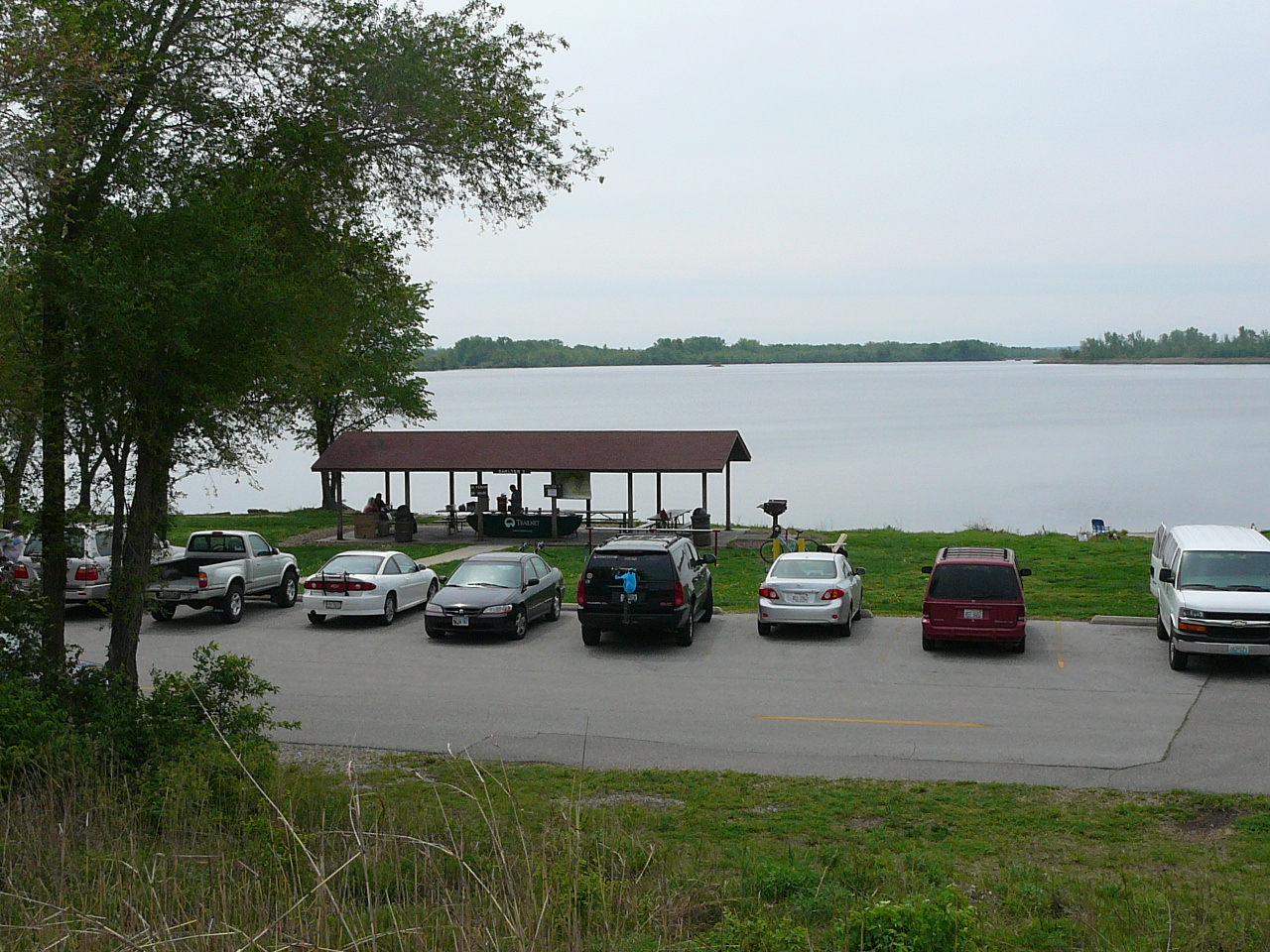
- Horseshoe Lake State Park, May 2009

- Location within Illinois Location within the United States
- Location: Madison County, Illinois, USA
- Nearest city: Granite City, Illinois
- Coordinates: 38°41′08″N 90°05′39″W
- Area: 2,960 acres (1,198 ha)
- Governing body: Illinois Department of Natural Resources

Horseshoe Lake State Park is an Illinois state park in Madison County, Illinois, United States. It is approximately 2,960 acres (1,198 ha) and surrounds a large horseshoe-shaped lake called Horseshoe Lake. Horseshoe Lake is the second largest natural lake in Illinois taking up approximately 2,400 acres (971 ha) of the 2,960-acre (1,198 ha) park. The park has connections to Madison County Transit's Schoolhouse Trail, which connects to over 85 miles (137 km) of bike trail in Madison County, and even a trail which goes all of the way to downtown St. Louis after crossing the Mississippi River on the Chain of Rocks Bridge. The park is located in southeastern Granite City, Illinois, 10-mile (16 km) northeast of downtown St. Louis.
