= Spring Lake State Fish and Wildlife Area =

State park in Illinois, USA

- IUCN category IV (habitat/species management area)
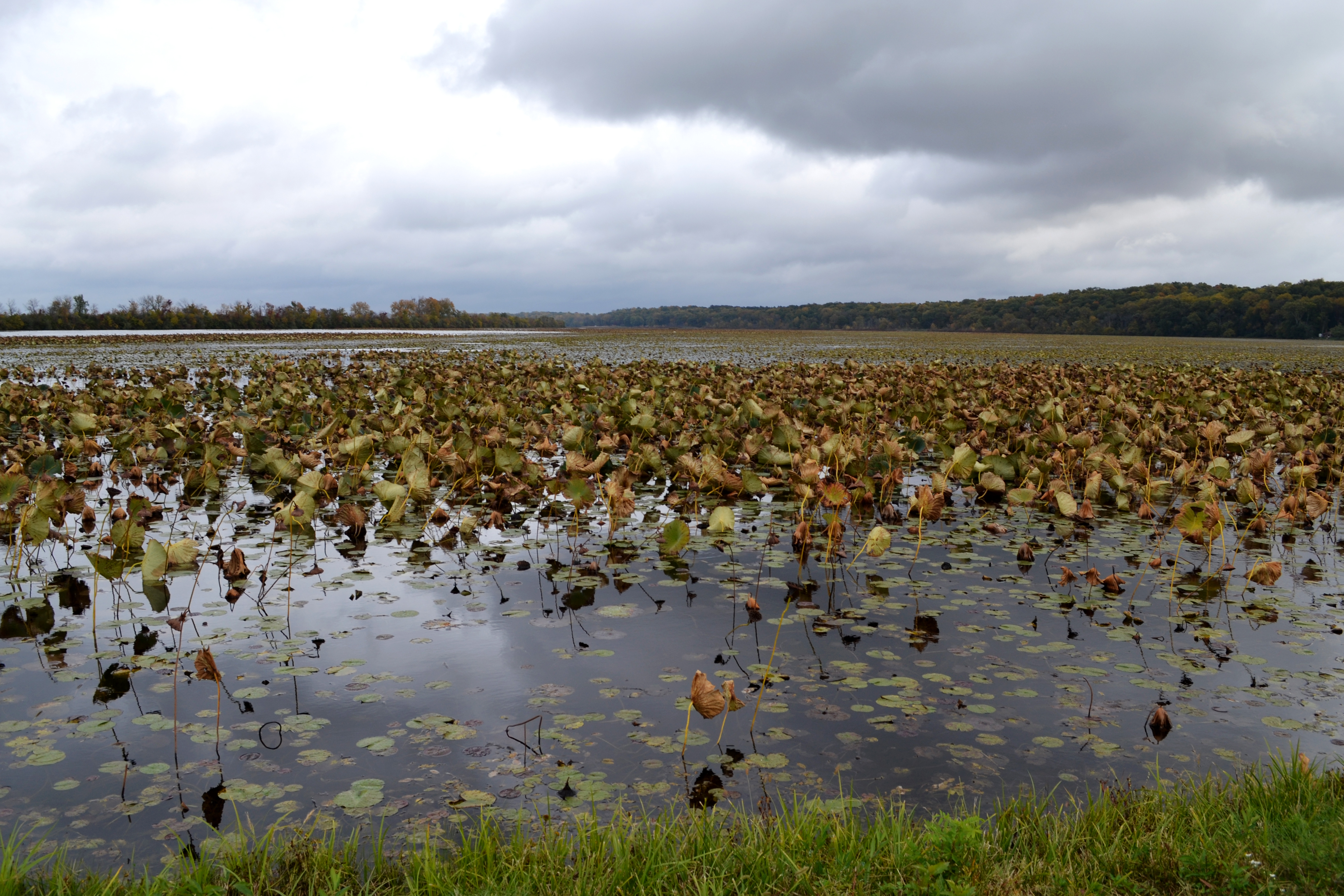
- Spring Lake (North)

- Location within Illinois Location within the United States
- Location: Tazewell County, Illinois, United States
- Nearest city: Manito, Illinois
- Coordinates: 40°28′27″N 89°50′48″W
- Area: 2,032 acres (822 ha)
- Established: 1950
- Governing body: Illinois Department of Natural Resources

Spring Lake State Fish and Wildlife Area is an Illinois state park on 2,032 acres (822 ha) in Tazewell County, Illinois, United States.

== Description ==
The state park is centered on Spring Lake, an 8.5-mile (13.7 km) long alluvial lake that lies parallel to the Illinois River. The lakebed lies by the foot of the river's sandstone bluff in an abandoned bed of the river, also known as a meander scar. It is a shallow lake that is no more than 10 feet (3.0 m) deep and an average depth of 2.9 feet (0.88 m).

The lake, located in the southwestern corner of Tazewell County, has been extensively altered by dikes built in the 1900s (decade) and the 1950s. The second dike system was built around both old Spring Lake and a second, smaller lake, Saiwell Lake, and caused the two lakes to almost merge into each other. The two lakes are now only separated by a spur dike, and both lakes are now called halves of modern Spring Lake.

The nearest major town is Manito, Illinois.

== Flora ==
Spring Lake has over 17 different species of aquatic vegetation, including Eurasian milfoil (invasive to Illinois), lily, and lotus. "The tremendous spring recharge from the bed of the lake amounts to 52 acre feet a day, creating very cold water temperatures under the insulating layer of vegetation for the majority of the summer months. This is a unique situation and only occurs in Spring Lake within the State of Illinois."

The site is one of the few remaining upland pine forests that still exist along the Illinois River. There is also oak-hickory woodland.

== Fauna ==
=== Fish ===
Spring Lake is managed by the Illinois Department of Natural Resources (IDNR) for largemouth bass, bluegill, bullhead, carp, channel catfish, crappie, muskie, northern pike, and sunfish. The water of the lake, fed by abundant local springs, is cooler than most Illinois River lakes.

In the 1980s, both north and south lakes were rehabilitated to remove an undesirable carp and gizzard shad population. This rehabilition improved water clarity, helped aquatic plants to grow, and improved the desirable fish population. Muskie are trap netted and spawned at Jake Wolf Fish Hatchery annually in March, producing over half a million eggs for state-wide needs.

=== Birds ===
Spring Lake is a popular birding area, with species such as: warblers, vireos, tanagers, mute swans, waders, dabbling ducks, snow buntings, longspurs, osprey, spoonbills, teal, and waterfowl. Peoria Audubon Society has logged about 250 species.

== Recreation ==
=== Fishing ===
There are four boat launching ramps. IDNR enforces a power limit of 25 horsepower (19 kW) in the lake.

=== Hunting ===
Waterfowl, squirrel, and deer archery hunting are permitted at Spring Lake.

=== Hiking ===
There are five trails within the park in mixed pine plantation and oak-hickory woodland: the Stage Coach Road (2.5 mi (4.0 km), Deer Run (0.5 mi (0.80 km), and the Whispering Pine which is divided into three separate trails (0.5 mi (0.80 km), 1 mi (1.6 km), and 2.5 mi (4.0 km).

=== Camping ===
There are two Class C campgrounds in the north park: Pine Campground and Oak Campground. Tent camping is also available. There are five-day use areas with picnic tables, and two of these have shelters available.
