= Lincoln Trail State Park =

State park in Clark County, Illinois

- IUCN category III (natural monument or feature)
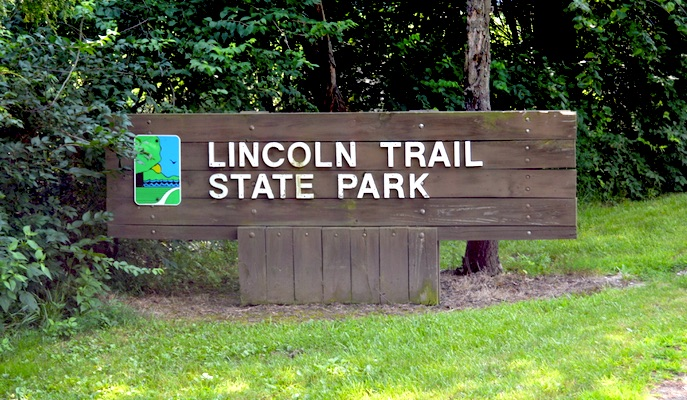
- Entrance to Lincoln Trail State Park

- Location within Illinois Location within the United States
- Location: Clark County, Illinois, USA
- Nearest city: Marshall, Illinois
- Coordinates: 39°20′45″N 87°43′06″W
- Area: 1,023 acres (4.14 km^{2})
- Established: 1958
- Governing body: Illinois Department of Natural Resources

Lincoln Trail State Park is a 1,023-acre (414 ha) Illinois state park located in Clark County, Illinois. It is positioned 2 miles (3 km) south of the city of Marshall, just west of Illinois Route 1. The state acquired the first 31 acres (13 ha) of the park in 1936; the park and lake were officially dedicated in 1958.

== Facilities and amenities ==
The main attraction of the park is the 146-acre (59 ha) Lincoln Trail Lake, which was the third lake created in Illinois (1955-1956) using federal monies under the Dingell-Johnson Act. The lake's maximum depth is 41 feet (12 m).

The park offers camping, hiking, fishing and boating (outboard motors are limited to 10 horsepower (7.5 kW)). Facilities include a launching ramp, parking for boat trailers and a full-service concession stand. Boat and seasonal dock rentals are available.
