= Double T State Fish and Wildlife Area =

State Fish and Wildlife Area in Fulton County, Illinois

Coordinates: 40.603°N 90.098°W

- IUCN category V (protected landscape/seascape)
- Location: Fulton County, Illinois
- Nearest city: Canton, Illinois
- Area: 1,961 acres (7.94 km^{2})
- Established: 2001
- Governing body: Illinois Department of Natural Resources

Double T State Fish and Wildlife Area, also known as the Double 'T' Goose Management Area, is a 1,961 acres (794 ha) State of Illinois recreation area. It is located within Fulton County, and is administered by the Illinois Department of Natural Resources (IDNR). The nearest large town is Canton, Illinois.

== History and current use ==
Double T State Fish and Wildlife Area is undergoing remediation as land that was strip mined for coal. The State of Illinois acquired the land making up this wildlife site in September 2001. The IDNR states that the area is being targeted for restoration activities and enhancement of wildlife habitat. The park as a whole is managed for hunting, with ducks, geese, and mourning doves featured.

Within the Wildlife Area is Double T Lake, a 64 acres (26 ha) lake managed for fishing. The lake, which formed inside a 1983 strip-mine excavation, is fished for largemouth bass. The lake also contains carp and gizzard shad. The geographic shape of the lake, a double-T or π pi shape, gave its name to both the lake and the overall Wildlife Area.
