= Hidden Springs State Forest =

Conservation area in Shelby County, Illinois

- IUCN category VI (protected area with sustainable use of natural resources)
- Location within Illinois
- Location: Shelby County, Illinois, United States
- Nearest city: Clarksburg, Illinois
- Coordinates: 39°19′07″N 88°41′24″W
- Area: 1,200 acres (486 ha)
- Established: 1960
- Governing body: Illinois Department of Natural Resources

Hidden Springs State Forest is a conservation area on 1,200 acres (486 ha) in Shelby County, Illinois, United States.

== 2008 closing ==
Hidden Springs State Forest was one of eleven state parks slated to close indefinitely on November 1, 2008, due to budget cuts by then-Illinois Governor Rod Blagojevich. After delay, which restored funding for some of the parks, a proposal to close seven state parks and a dozen state historic sites, including Hidden Springs, went ahead on November 30, 2008. After the impeachment of Illinois Governor Blagojevich, new governor Pat Quinn reopened the closed state parks in February. In March 2009 Quinn announced he is committed to reopening the state historic sites by June 30, 2009.
