= One Horse Gap =

Forest preserve in Illinois, United States

One Horse Gap is a forest preserve managed by the United States Forest Service, located in the Shawnee National Forest outside Herod, Illinois. It contains a short loop trail named "the gap trail," a narrow section in the bluffs that is only wide enough for one horse to pass through at a time. The trail provides access to Big Grand Pierre Creek, One Horse Gap Lake, War Bluff, and the River to River Trail.

== Geology and history ==
During the Carboniferous period (circa 300 million years before the present), local geological conditions laid down a thick bed of gray sandstone in what is now called Southern Illinois. The eroding sandstone rocks are the remains of mountains that are over 300 million years old. The area is geologically located on the south edge of an east-west trough formed by the northward tilt of the bedrock, and has been greatly affected by earthquakes and uplift. The combined effects of tremors, glacial melt waters, rain, freezing, thawing and wind have naturally sculpted the bluffs into several unusual formations. Unlike much of Illinois, this plateau was never covered by glaciers; the furthest advance of ice sheets during the Illinoisan glaciation stopped just north of the area. Large areas are rounded and bare of vegetation.

As with other wilderness areas within the Shawnee National Forest, One Horse Gap is made of second-growth forested areas, also known as a "Depression Forest." Until the land condemnations of the 1930s, this land was mainly used for agriculture and logging. Between 1880–1920s, Southern Illinois played a national role in timber production. Individual acres of bottom land hardwoods yielded 25,000 board feet compared with an average Illinois bottom land forest at 9,000 board feet. As a consequence of the reckless clearing, intensive logging, and the local practice of annually burning off the woods, southern Illinois hill-land was severely eroded or badly damaged by 1930. In the first year of operation, 1933–1934, the Civil Conservation Corps brought much needed jobs to the poverty stricken areas; a total of 40,888 acres in options was approved on 263 tracts at an estimated cost of $4.59 per acre. By 1939, the Shawnee National Forest had 183,446 acres purchased or optioned, and on September 6, President Roosevelt proclaimed the purchase units as the Shawnee National Forest.
