= Trail of Tears State Forest =

State forest in Illinois, United States

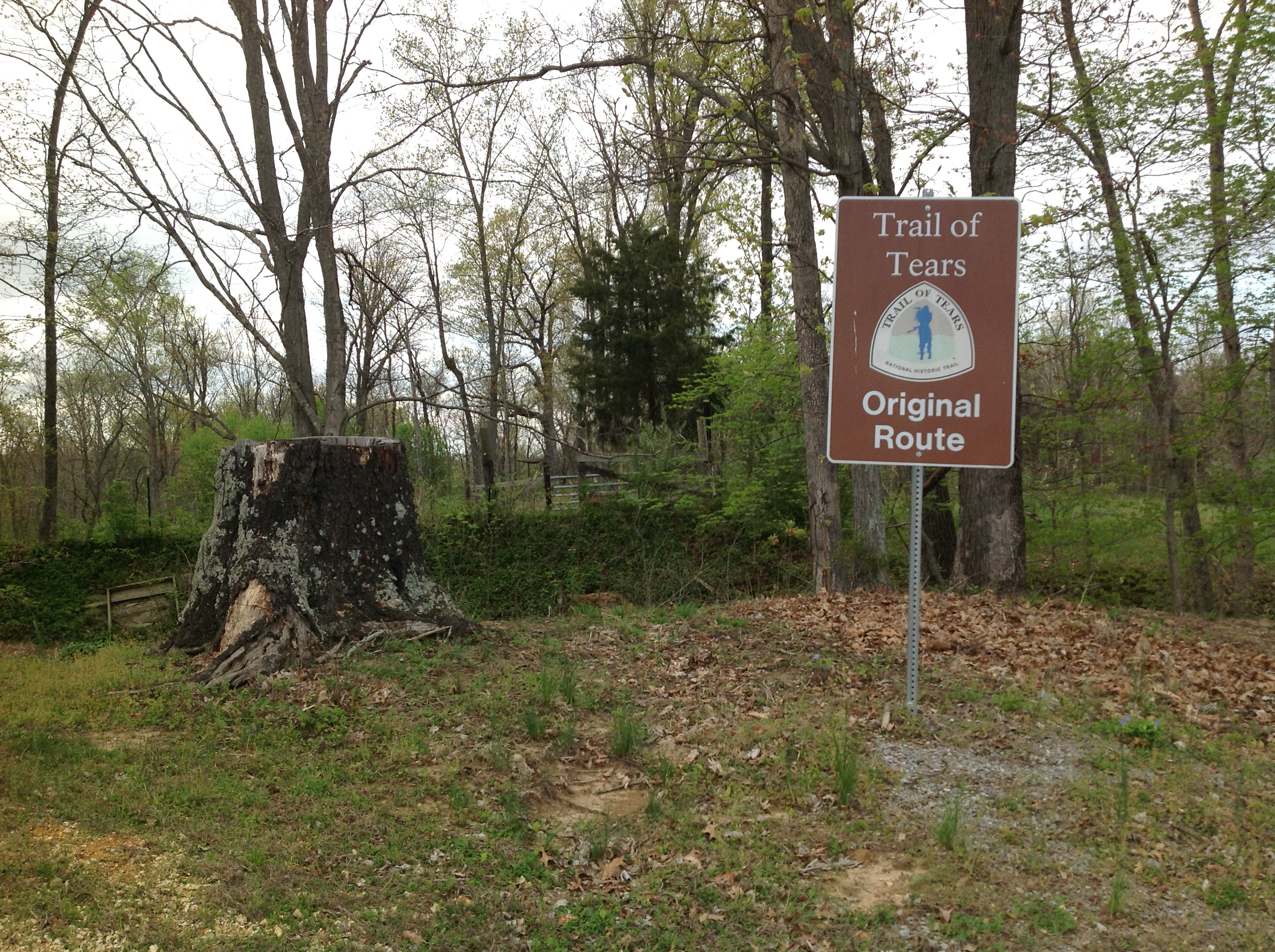

- Location within Illinois
- Location: Union County, Illinois, United States
- Nearest city: Jonesboro, Illinois
- Coordinates: 37°30′55″N 89°20′25″W
- Area: 5,114 acres (2,070 ha)
- Established: 1929
- Governing body: Illinois Department of Natural Resources

Trail of Tears State Forest is a State of Illinois conservation area on 5,114 acres (2,070 ha) in Union County, Illinois, United States.

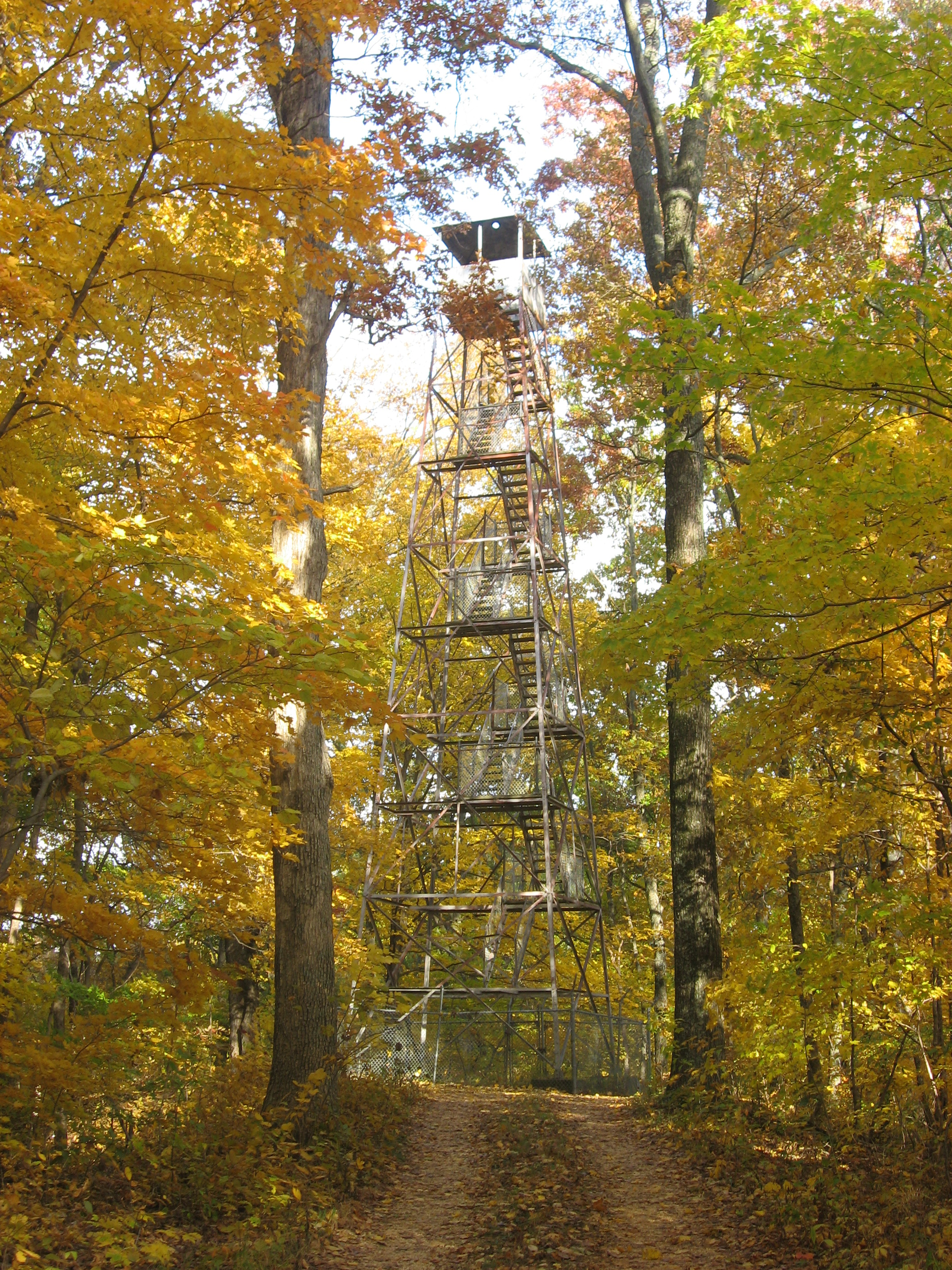
The view of Trail of Tears State Forest from the west

Trail of Tears was established in 1929 when Illinois purchased 3,000-acre (1,200 ha) acres of Shawnee Hills land and used the resulting land to create the Kohn-Jackson Forest (later Union County State Forest). Soon afterwards, the state park was improved with work performed by the Civilian Conservation Corps. Subsequent land acquisitions created the 5,114-acre (2,070 ha) Trail of Tears State Forest of today. The forest occupies land near the route followed by the Cherokee in December 1838 during their forced relocation in the Trail of Tears.

Today's state forest contains a state tree nursery, the 222-acre (90 ha) Ozark Hills Nature Preserve, and 22 miles (35 km) of trails for hiking and equestrian use. The nearest town of any size is Jonesboro, Illinois.

== See also ==
- Union County State Fish and Wildlife Area
