= Coffeen, Illinois =

- City
- Location in Montgomery County, Illinois
- Coordinates: 39°5′18″N 89°23′23″W
- Country: United States
- State: Illinois
- County: Montgomery
- Township: East Fork

Area
  - Total: 1.16 sq mi (3.01 km^{2})
  - Land: 1.16 sq mi (3.01 km^{2})
  - Water: 0 sq mi (0.00 km^{2})
- Elevation: 630 ft (190 m)

Population (2020)
  - Total: 647
  - Density: 557.3/sq mi (215.18/km^{2})
- Time zone: UTC-6 (CST)
  - Summer (DST): UTC-5 (CDT)
- ZIP code: 62017
- Area code: 217
- FIPS code: 17-15352
- GNIS feature ID: 2393583

Coffeen is a small city in Montgomery County, Illinois, United States. The population was 647 at the 2020 census.

== History ==
Coffeen was named after one of its founders, Gustavus Coffeen.

== Geography ==
Coffeen is in southeastern Montgomery County, along Illinois Route 185 (Main Street). It is 8 miles (13 km) southeast of Hillsboro, the county seat, and 20 miles (32 km) northwest of Vandalia.

According to the U.S. Census Bureau, Coffeen has a total area of 1.16 square miles (3.00 km^{2}), all land. It is on high ground that drains east to a tributary of the East Fork of Shoal Creek and west to Coffeen Lake, a reservoir on a different tributary of the East Fork. The city is within the Kaskaskia River watershed.

== Demographics ==
Historical population
Census	Pop.	Note	%±
1890	518		—
1900	963		85.9%
1910	980		1.8%
1920	945		−3.6%
1930	703		−25.6%
1940	704		0.1%
1950	627		−10.9%
1960	502		−19.9%
1970	641		27.7%
1980	842		31.4%
1990	736		−12.6%
2000	709		−3.7%
2010	685		−3.4%
2020	647		−5.5%
U.S. Decennial Census

As of the census of 2000, there were 709 people, 292 households, and 202 families residing in the city. The population density was 687.2 inhabitants per square mile (265.3/km^{2}). There were 320 housing units at an average density of 310.1 per square mile (119.7/km^{2}). The racial makeup of the city was 98.87% White, 0.28% Native American, 0.56% Asian, and 0.28% from two or more races. Hispanic or Latino of any race were 0.14% of the population.

There were 292 households, out of which 31.8% had children under the age of 18 living with them, 55.1% were married couples living together, 9.6% had a female householder with no husband present, and 30.5% were non-families. 28.1% of all households were made up of individuals, and 18.5% had someone living alone who was 65 years of age or older. The average household size was 2.43 and the average family size was 2.93.

In the city, the population was spread out, with 25.8% under the age of 18, 6.1% from 18 to 24, 26.5% from 25 to 44, 21.6% from 45 to 64, and 20.0% who were 65 years of age or older. The median age was 40 years. For every 100 females, there were 96.9 males. For every 100 females age 18 and over, there were 88.5 males.

The median income for a household in the city was $29,375, and the median income for a family was $38,750. Males had a median income of $35,938 versus $16,429 for females. The per capita income for the city was $13,755. About 16.2% of families and 20.6% of the population were below the poverty line, including 27.0% of those under age 18 and 13.0% of those age 65 or over.
