= Ramsey Creek (Mississippi River tributary) =

Stream in the American state of Missouri

Coordinates: 39.296159°N 90.799294°W

Ramsey Creek is a stream in Pike County in the U.S. state of Missouri. It is a tributary of the Mississippi River.

A variant spelling was "Ramsay Creek". The creek has the name of Captain Allen Ramsay, who was killed by Indians in the area during the War of 1812.

== See also ==
- List of rivers of Missouri
