= Clear Springs Wilderness =

Wilderness area in Illinois, US

- IUCN category Ib (wilderness area)
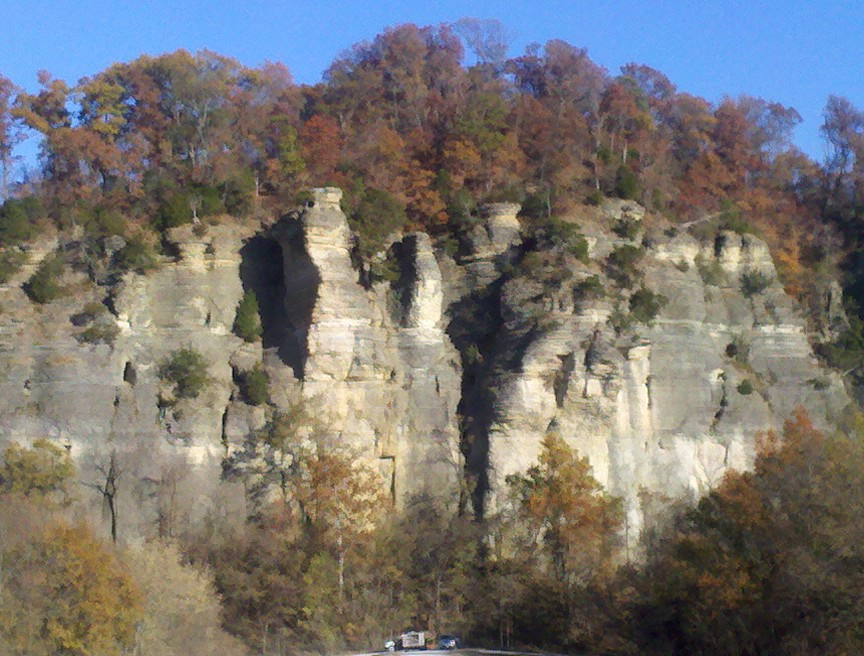

- Location within the United States
- Location: Union and Jackson Counties, Illinois, USA
- Nearest city: Wolf Lake, IL
- Coordinates: 37°35′N 89°25′W
- Area: 4,730 acres (1,910 ha)
- Established: 1990
- Governing body: U.S. Forest Service

The Clear Springs Wilderness is a 4,730-acre (19.1 km^{2}) parcel of land listed as a Wilderness Area of the United States. Adjacent to it is the LaRue-Pine Hills Research Natural Area, a National Natural Landmark noted for a large and diverse population of snakes.

The wilderness is located within the Shawnee National Forest in southwestern Jackson County and northwestern Union County in the U.S. state of Illinois. The nearest town of any size is Wolf Lake, Illinois.

== Second-growth wilderness ==
The steep hills of the Clear Springs Wilderness are drained by many limestone springs, including Clear Springs, which drains into Hutchins Creek and then into Clear Creek.

As with other wilderness areas within Shawnee National Forest, the Clear Springs Wilderness is made up of second-growth forested areas that were used, until the land acquisitions of the 1930s, as agriculture land. The steep eastern bluffs over the Big Muddy River were not good ground for agriculture. Most of the soil that used to be here has eroded into the Big Muddy's bed. Firewood was cut here, and farmers may have tried to use the region's well-watered, temperate climate for livestock grazing. Shawnee National Forest was created in 1939, and in 1990, the Illinois Wilderness Act set aside seven separate parcels of land within this National Forest as relatively small wilderness areas. The Clear Springs Wilderness, one of these parcels, is a roadless parcel of land within the national forest.

The Clear Springs Wilderness borders the Bald Knob Wilderness, which lies to the south and east. The two wilderness parcels are separated by Hutchins Creek. Both wildernesses are managed by the United States Forest Service and are served by the forest's River to River Trail.

From Wolf Lake, visitors may choose to drive north approximately 3.5 miles (5.5 km) on Illinois Route 3 until they get to the ghost town of La Rue, Illinois. From here an eastward local road, by means of a series of hairpin turns, provides motor vehicle access up the bluff to the edge of the wilderness area, which is perched atop the bluff. The local road is officially called LaRue Road, but is widely and unofficially called Snake Road because of the large quantities of snakes that use the road for their seasonal migrations. For this reason the access road is often closed to motorized traffic. Snake species found here include the black rat, common king, rough green, western ribbon, ringneck, red-bellied, black racer, the venomous copperhead, and the venomous cottonmouth.

The LaRue-Pine Hills zone has also been listed as an Important Bird Area of Illinois.
