= Bald Knob Wilderness =

Wilderness area in Illinois, United States

Coordinates: 37°33′02″N 89°22′39″W

The Bald Knob Wilderness is a 5,973-acre (24.2 km²) parcel of land listed as a Wilderness Area of the United States. It is, by acreage, the second largest wilderness area located within the U.S. state of Illinois. It is located within the Shawnee National Forest in northwestern Union County, Illinois.

== Second-growth wilderness ==
As with other wilderness areas within Shawnee National Forest, the Bald Knob Wilderness is made of second-growth forested areas that were used, until the land acquisitions of the 1930s, as agriculture land. The United States Forest Service, which manages the wilderness, describes it as a land of "homestead[s], fruit trees, cemeteries, and abandoned roads."

The steep western slope of Bald Knob, a high hill or low mountain within the Shawnee Hills region of far southern Illinois, was never good ground for agriculture. Firewood was cut here and farmers tried to use the region's well-watered, temperate climate to grow orchard fruits such as apples.

Shawnee National Forest was created in 1939, and in 1990, the Illinois Wilderness Act set aside seven separate parcels of land within this National Forest as relatively small wilderness areas. The Bald Knob Wilderness, one of these parcels, is a roadless parcel of land within the national forest.

Visitors who travel by road to the Bald Knob Cross, as they drive up the east side of the mountain to the cross, skirt the Bald Knob Wilderness on their drive. As with the mountaintop cross, the nearest municipality is Alto Pass, Illinois.

The Bald Knob Wilderness borders the Clear Springs Wilderness, which lies to the north and west. The two wilderness parcels are separated by Hutchins Creek. Both wildernesses are served by the River to River Trail.
