= Union County State Fish and Wildlife Area =

State park in Illinois, USA

Union County State Fish and Wildlife Area, Illinois, U.S.
- IUCN category IV (habitat/species management area)
- Location within Illinois Location within the United States
- Location: Union County, Illinois, U.S.
- Nearest city: Jonesboro, Illinois
- Coordinates: 37°24′30″N 89°22′32″W
- Area: 6,202 acres (2,510 ha)
- Established: 1940s
- Governing body: Illinois Department of Natural Resources

Union County State Fish and Wildlife Area is an Illinois state park on 6,202 acres (2,510 ha) in Union County, Illinois, United States. It contains extensive Clear Creek wetlands managed for fishing and bird hunting.
