= Illinois Department of Natural Resources =

Agency in the US state of Illinois

Department of Natural Resources
Department overview
- Jurisdiction: Illinois
- Headquarters: One Natural Resources Way, Springfield, Illinois 62702
- Department executive: Natalie Phelps Finnie, Director of Natural Resources
- Website: dnr.illinois.gov

The Illinois Department of Natural Resources (IDNR) is the code department of the Illinois state government that operates the Illinois State Parks and state recreation areas, enforces the fishing and game laws of Illinois, regulates Illinois coal mines and other extractive industries, operates the Illinois State Museum system, and oversees scientific research into the soil, water, and mineral resources of the state. In 2017, the Illinois Historic Preservation Division was added to its portfolio. It is headquartered in the state capital of Springfield.

== History ==
The former Illinois Department of Conservation was reorganized into the Illinois Department of Natural Resources by executive order in 1995. The reorganization, codified into state law by Public Act 89-50, also added functions of the former Illinois Department of Energy and Natural Resources and the Illinois Department of Mines and Minerals to the agglomerated agency.

== Organization ==
As of 2009, the Illinois Department of Natural Resources was divided up into 16 offices and bureaus

- Administration
- Architecture, Engineering and Grants
- Compliance, Equal Employment Opportunity and Ethics
- Director
- Law Enforcement
- Land Management
- Legal Counsel
- Legislation
- Mines & Minerals
- Public Events, Programs & Promotions
- Public Services and Education
- Realty & Environmental Planning
- Resource Conservation
- State Museums
- Water Resources
- State Surveys

In 2017, parts of the Illinois Historic Preservation Agency, were folded in the IDNR and became the Illinois Historic Preservation Division.

== Today ==
As of fiscal year 2006, the Illinois Department of Natural Resources had a budget of $187.1 million Its headquarters is located at 1 Natural Resources Way, Springfield, Illinois 62702, adjacent to the Illinois State Fairgrounds.

== See also ==
- List of law enforcement agencies in Illinois
- List of state and territorial fish and wildlife management agencies in the United States
- Illinois State Parks
