= Walnut Hill, Illinois =

- Village
- Location in Marion County, Illinois
- Coordinates: 38°28′40″N 89°02′41″W
- Country: United States
- State: Illinois
- County: Marion
- Township: Centralia

Government
  - Mayor: John Correll

Area
  - Total: 0.38 sq mi (0.98 km^{2})
  - Land: 0.38 sq mi (0.98 km^{2})
  - Water: 0 sq mi (0.00 km^{2})
- Elevation: 568 ft (173 m)

Population (2020)
  - Total: 95
  - Density: 250.1/sq mi (96.57/km^{2})
- Time zone: UTC-6 (CST)
  - Summer (DST): UTC-5 (CDT)
- ZIP code: 62893
- Area code: 618
- FIPS code: 17-78604
- GNIS ID: 2400088

Walnut Hill is a village in Marion County, Illinois, United States. The population was 95 at the 2020 census.

== History ==
Walnut Hill was once the intersection of two of the main roads in Illinois: the George Rogers Clark Trace and the Yadda Road.

The original capital of Illinois was at Kaskaskia, 70 miles (110 km) southwest of present-day Walnut Hill. The overland route from Kaskaskia to the interior of the state followed the Kaskaskia/[[Big Muddy River]] divide, which went through Walnut Hill. George Rogers Clark marched through Walnut Hill in February 1779 on his march from Fort Kaskaskia to Fort Vincennes, which resulted in the conquest of Illinois by the army of Virginia.

Traces of the Kaskaskia/Vincennes road can be seen in several short stretches in northwestern Jefferson County, which point toward Walnut Hill, ignoring the surveyed Section boundaries. Northeast of Walnut Hill, the Kell Road is a winding, pioneer road up to its intersection with Interstate 57, from which it follows the modern Section lines to Kell.

Walnut Hill was also on the Goshen Road, an early road across Illinois, from Shawneetown to the Goshen Settlement near Glen Carbon. Remnants of the Goshen Road can be seen in short segments of Pioneer Road between Dix and Walnut Hill. The construction of the railroad tracks from Dix to Walnut Hill possibly obliterated much of the original Goshen road.

In 1823, Thomas D. Minor built a road from Mount Vernon to Walnut Hill. This was called the "Vandalia Road", in that it connected with roads to the new state capital in Vandalia. The new road joined the Goshen Road just south of Walnut Hill. Today, it is called the "Old Centralia Road". The new road eventually captured much of the traffic on the Goshen Road since it provided a shorter route across Jefferson County.

The modern road (Walnut Hill Road) running northwest out of Walnut Hill toward Centralia is the same as the Goshen Road as shown on the original survey maps of Illinois.

=== William Goings Gang ===
In the early 19th century, William Goings (also spelled Goins) kept a tavern that was presumably on land homesteaded by Goings about two miles south of Walnut Hill in Jefferson County. Goings led a band of robbers known as the "Goings Gang" that preyed on frontier travelers on the Vincennes-St. Louis Trace, a dirt road that was originally an old bison path that extended through southern Illinois. The gang operated a series of connected frontier taverns along this road, passing information on to gang members whenever a traveler worth robbing stopped at one of their taverns. When the unfortunate traveler reached a remote spot, the gang members would assemble and relieve them of their property.

As in other frontier areas, neighboring settlers overlooked this activity until the Goings Gang escalated to murder in 1818–1819. In response, the settlers organized a group of vigilantes or "rangers" who surprised the Goings Gang at Walnut Hill. The gang members were tied to trees, flogged, and ordered to leave the county, an order which all but one obeyed. The following year, the vigilantes returned and cropped the ears of this obstinate gang member, who may have been criminal gang leader William Goings, possibly because they believed he had no use for his ears as he would not listen and cease in his criminal activities. The tavern site of one of the reported gang members, Samuel Young of Marion County, was excavated by archaeologists working for the Illinois Department of Transportation in 1988 prior to its destruction by a highway project.

== Geography ==
Walnut Hill is located in southwestern Marion County. Its southern border is the Jefferson County line. The county boundary is the baseline of the Third Principal Meridian, also called the Centralia Baseline. The survey of this area was begun as early as 1804.

Centralia is 7 miles (11 km) to the northwest of Walnut Hill, and Salem, the Marion county seat, is 14 miles (23 km) to the northeast. Mount Vernon, the Jefferson County seat, is 14 miles to the southeast.

According to the U.S. Census Bureau, Walnut Hill has a total area of 0.38 square miles (0.98 km^{2}), all land. To the north of Walnut Hill is Raccoon Creek, a west-flowing tributary of the Kaskaskia River. To the south is the Big Muddy River, a small creek at the northernmost limit of its watershed. Walnut Hill is thus on the Kaskaskia/Big Muddy divide. That divide is a ridge that formed a natural, pioneer highway from Sparta to Kell, perhaps properly called the "Highway to Kell".

== Demographics ==
Historical population
Census	Pop.	Note	%±
1880	138		—
1930	125		—
1940	160		28.0%
1950	156		−2.5%
1960	153		−1.9%
1970	149		−2.6%
1980	223		49.7%
1990	133		−40.4%
2000	109		−18.0%
2010	108		−0.9%
2020	95		−12.0%
U.S. Decennial Census

As of the census of 2000, there were 109 people, 45 households, and 30 families residing in the village. The population density was 294.2 inhabitants per square mile (113.6/km^{2}). There were 50 housing units at an average density of 134.9 per square mile (52.1/km^{2}). The racial makeup of the village was 99.08% White and 0.92% African American.

There were 45 households, of which 48.9% had children under 18 living with them, 37.8% were married couples living together, 20.0% had a female householder with no husband present, and 33.3% were non-families. 31.1% of all households comprised individuals, and 28.9% had someone who was 65 or older living alone. The average household size was 2.42 and the average family size was 2.90.

The village's population was spread out, with 33.0% under 18, 5.5% from 18 to 24, 35.8% from 25 to 44, 11.0% from 45 to 64, and 14.7% who were 65 or older. The median age was 33 years. For every 100 females, there were 67.7 males. For every 100 females age 18 and over, there were 58.7 males.

The median income for a household in the village was $21,250, and the median income for a family was $30,625. Males had a median income of $26,250 versus $15,417 for females. The per capita income for the village was $9,025. There were no families, and 3.9% of the population lived below the poverty line, including those under eighteens and 26.7% over 64.
