= Dardeen family homicides =

Unsolved 1987 Illinois quadruple homicide

- From left, Elaine, Peter, and Keith Dardeen
- Date: November 17–18, 1987
- Location: Ina, Illinois, U.S.; 38.1423°N 88.9042°W
- Type: Mass murder
- Cause: Beating, firearm
- Motive: Unknown
- Deaths: 4
- Coroner: Drs. Richard Garretson and Robert Lewis
- Suspects: Tommy Lynn Sells

The Dardeen family homicides were a series of murders that occurred on November 18, 1987, near Ina, Illinois, United States. The victims were members of the Dardeen family, including Ruby Elaine Dardeen, her young son, and her newborn daughter. Investigators determined that members of the family were victims of a targeted attack. Despite extensive investigation by local and state authorities, no suspects have been charged. With no clear motive or viable leads, the incident has remained a cold case. The case remains unsolved and is regarded as one of the most disturbing criminal cases in Illinois history.

On the evening of November 18, law enforcement officers conducted a welfare check at the family's mobile home after Russell Keith Dardeen, aged 29, failed to report to work. Inside the residence, officers discovered the bodies of Ruby Dardeen and the couple's son Peter. Ruby, 30 years old and pregnant at the time, had sustained fatal injuries that resulted in premature labor. The infant was also found deceased at the scene.

Keith was not present at the residence. Investigators initially considered him as the primary suspect. However, the following day, his body was discovered in a nearby field, and his death was ruled as homicide. He had been shot and suffered genital mutilation. His vehicle was found parked near the Benton police station. Forensic analysis indicated that he had been killed within approximately an hour of his family.

Residents of Jefferson and Franklin counties, already concerned after more than ten local murders in the preceding two years, experienced heightened fear following the incident. Some residents armed themselves, while others reported psychological distress. Early speculation suggested the killings might have been linked to Satanism, but investigators quickly ruled it out along with other potential motives, including those related to drug trafficking, marital infidelity, or gambling. Forensic examination of the crime scene also indicated that rape and robbery were not factors.

No suspects were officially identified in the quadruple homicide until the 2000s, when serial killer Tommy Lynn Sells, following his conviction and death sentence for the murder of a teenage girl in Texas, claimed responsibility for the crime. However, he was never charged, as prison authorities in Texas would not permit him to leave the state to assist police in Southern Illinois with their investigation. Both law enforcement and members of the Dardeen family expressed doubts about his account of the killings, as Sells had a documented history of making false confessions.

== Background ==
Both Dardeens went by their middle names. Keith, a native of Mount Carmel, bought the trailer in 1986 after completing the training required for his job as a treatment plant operator at the Rend Lake Water Conservancy District's nearby facility. Elaine, who was from Albion, a little closer to Ina, moved there later with their 2-year-old son, Peter. They rented the land it sat on from a nearby farming couple. Keith worked; his wife found a job at an office supply store in Mount Vernon, the Jefferson County seat. When not working, the couple was part of the musical ensemble at a small Baptist church in the village. Keith sang lead vocals while Elaine played the piano.

In 1987 Elaine became pregnant with the couple's second child. They had decided to name the baby either Ian or Casey depending on whether it was a boy or a girl. The pending addition to the family had led Keith and Elaine to strongly consider moving; by late in the year they had put the mobile home up for sale.

But that was not the only reason for the move. According to Joeann Dardeen, Keith's mother, he had said he would move back to Mount Carmel even if he were unable to find a job there before doing so, as he regretted ever having moved to Ina, telling her that the area was becoming too violent. There had been 15 homicides in Jefferson County during the previous two years, starting with those committed by Thomas Odle, a Mount Vernon teenager who had killed his parents and three siblings as they individually returned to the house one night in 1985.

Though Odle, as well as some of those charged with murder in the other cases, had been convicted, residents of the rural area had become fearful and stressed. A friend of Keith said that, after a 10-year-old girl had been raped and murdered in the area in May 1987, Keith became so protective of the family that one night, when a young woman came by the mobile home asking if she could make a phone call, he refused to let her in.

== Discovery of bodies ==
On November 18, Keith, who had been a reliable worker at the treatment plant, did not report for his shift. He had not called to inform his supervisor that he would be unable to come in, and calls to his house went unanswered all day. His supervisor called both of Keith's parents, who were divorced but still lived near each other in Mount Carmel. Neither of them knew what could have happened to their son.

Don Dardeen, Keith's father, called the Jefferson County sheriff's office and agreed to drive down to Ina with the house key and meet deputies at the home of his son and daughter-in-law, between Illinois Route 37 and the former Illinois Central Railroad tracks, now used by Union Pacific, just north of the Franklin County line. Inside they found the bodies of Elaine, Peter, and a newborn girl, all tucked into the same bed. Elaine had been bound and gagged with duct tape; both had been beaten to death–apparently with a baseball bat found at the scene, a birthday gift to Peter from his father earlier that year. Elaine had been beaten so severely that she had gone into labor and delivered a girl, who soon met with the same fate as her mother and brother.

Keith was not present, nor was his car, a red 1981 Plymouth. Investigators assumed he had killed his wife and children and was at large. A team of armed police went to his mother's house in Mount Carmel looking for him. The search ended late the following day, however, when a group of hunters found his body in a wheatfield not far from the trailer, just south of the Franklin-Jefferson County line, near Rend Lake College. He had been shot three times; his penis was also severed. The Plymouth was found parked outside the police station in Benton, 11 miles (18 km) south of the Dardeen home, its interior spattered with blood.

=== Social effect ===
News of the killings made area residents even more fearful than they had already been. Many residents began going about their daily business with shotguns visible in their vehicles' gun racks. After high school basketball games, students would wait in the school building for their parents to come in and accompany them to the parking lot for their ride home instead of socializing outside as they normally did.

Early reports from police about the crime were limited, and sometimes contradictory, allowing rumors to spread. The two counties' respective coroners differed on whether Keith had died of a head injury or being shot; among those who reported the former, it was said that it had been inflicted when he was dragged from a car. The circumstances under which Elaine gave birth, perhaps posthumously, to her short-lived daughter, gave rise to stories that Casey (as the family called her) had been ripped from her mother's womb. Along with the mutilation of Keith's genitals, this supported speculation that Satanists were active in the area and had performed a ritual sacrifice of the family. The crime was also posited to be the work, along with three other local unsolved murders, of a regional serial killer.

Dr. Richard Garretson, a family physician who doubled as the Jefferson County coroner, told the St. Louis Post-Dispatch in early December that many of his patients talked to him about the case and how it had disturbed them. One man who said he lived a half-mile (900 m) from the Dardeens' trailer told Garretson he was having difficulty sleeping and had lost 14 pounds (6.4 kg) as a result of the stress. Also unable to sleep was the Dardeens' landlords' daughter, who told her parents years later that she kept her bedroom light on and read all night out of fear.

Robert Lewis, the Franklin County coroner, felt much of the fear was unjustified. "I don't think there is a rational basis for the near hysteria," he told the newspaper, "The people are frightening each other." People were so afraid, he said, that if someone ran out of gas in the county he would not seek assistance in any nearby homes but would instead walk to the nearest highway and hitch a ride.

== Investigation ==
Local police agencies joined forces with the Illinois State Police to investigate the crime. A total of 30 detectives worked full-time following leads and interviewing 100 people. None of what they found proved fruitful. A man taken into custody early on was released after being questioned; likewise, a coworker of Keith's with whom he reportedly had been having a dispute was cleared.

No one who knew the couple had anything bad to say about them. A small quantity of marijuana was found in the trailer, but not enough to suggest they were involved in dealing. Police even believed the marijuana might have been inadvertently left behind by the killer or killers. The autopsies found no drugs or alcohol in any of the victims.

The coroners put the time of death for all the Dardeens at within an hour of each other. The bodies in the trailer had been killed 12 hours before they were found, and Keith Dardeen had been dead for 24 to 36 hours when he was found. Resolving this question, however, made it harder to determine how the crime had been committed, since Keith's body was found away from the trailer, and he may have been killed at that location rather than with his family. At the trailer, the killer or killers had apparently taken the time to not only tuck Elaine's body into bed along with her children's bodies but also to clean up the scene, suggesting they did not feel any urgency to leave. The amount of effort involved led police to theorize that the crime may have taken place at night: the trailer was on Route 37, a busy state highway, but could be seen at the time (Note: The construction of Big Muddy River Correctional Center near the scene since then has obstructed that view.) from Interstate 57 almost 2,000 feet (610 m) to the west. It was also an open question as to whether there was one killer or multiple.

=== Possible motives ===
Determining the motive of the assailant(s) was a particularly difficult part of the case. The back door had been left open; there was no evidence of forced entry. A VCR and portable camera were in plain sight in the living room. Elsewhere in the house easily accessible cash and jewelry remained. These facts argued against robbery as the motive. Elaine had not been raped or sexually assaulted.

Police also found no evidence of any extramarital affairs involving either Keith or Elaine that might have motivated the other party to a jealous rage. A stack of papers with sports scores found in the house led them to wonder whether Keith might have incurred gambling debts. However, Joeann Dardeen told police her son was so frugal that he raised money for his young son's college fund by reselling 50-cent cans of soda at work for a small profit.

Despite the widespread fear the case engendered, Lewis, the Franklin County coroner, did not believe the Dardeens were randomly chosen. "I believe it was a very personal, deliberate thing," he told the Post-Dispatch. A police expert on cults told the newspaper that the rumor that Satanists were responsible was untrue, since such groups often would mutilate bodies more extensively, harvest organs, and leave symbols and lit candles at the scene of their crimes. None of these indications had been found at the Dardeen's trailer.

But police did allow for the possibility that, while the Dardeens were chosen purposely, it may have been a case of mistaken identity by the killer or killers. Joeann Dardeen said later that she had considered other motives someone might have had for killing her son and his family. "I think someone wanted Keith to sell drugs and he refused," she said in 1997. "Or there's a possibility someone liked Elaine and she wouldn't accept his advances and he took out his rage on both of them ... We just don't know."

=== Continuing efforts ===
Eventually, the police exhausted all leads and had to start working other cases. Two FBI profilers came to the area to review the evidence. They were able to make some suggestions, but generally found that the crime defied their typical analytic methods.

Joeann Dardeen worked to keep the public from completely losing interest. Throughout the 1990s, she regularly called the one detective still assigned to the case, offering possible leads she had learned of or asking for any new information he could share. She gathered 3,000 signatures from area residents on a petition to The Oprah Winfrey Show, asking producers to do a segment on the killings of her son and his family. They turned her down, saying the crime was too brutal for daytime television. America's Most Wanted had a similar reaction at first, but then changed its mind and ran a segment in 1998. The show did not generate any new leads.

Police were briefly interested in serial killer Ángel Maturino Reséndiz, then known by his alias Rafael Resendes Ramirez, after he surrendered to authorities in Texas in 1999. He often traveled around the country by hopping freight trains, choosing his victims near the tracks they traveled and often beating them to death. While those elements suggested the Dardeen killings, authorities in Illinois were never able to connect him to the crime.

== Apparent Tommy Lynn Sells confession ==
Another serial killer in Texas would soon bring himself to the attention of the investigators in Illinois. On the last day of 1999, Tommy Lynn Sells cut the throats of two girls near Del Rio, Texas. One survived and helped police identify him; he was eventually convicted and sentenced to death for that murder and another one earlier in 1999, where he had killed a girl in San Antonio. While he was awaiting trial on the first murder charge, he began confessing to other murders he had committed while drifting around the country, sometimes by hopping freights as well.

One was the Dardeen family. Sells said he did not remember the details of all the crimes he admitted to, which he describes as a coping strategy from the sexual abuse he endured as a child in the Missouri Bootheel, but he did remember that one. In the mid-1980s, Sells was living primarily near St. Louis, roughly 90 miles (140 km) northwest of Jefferson County, and making money from working at traveling carnivals and fairs, as a day laborer, or through theft. For the latter pursuit, he often hitched rides with truckers or hopped freights without any particular destination in mind. "Anywhere a ride was going I was heading that way. Might be in Illinois today and Oklahoma tomorrow," Sells explained later.

It was through those modes of transportation that he became familiar with the Ina area. On one trip through Jefferson County in November 1987, he claimed in 2010 to have met Keith at a truck stop near Mount Vernon or, in a different retelling, at a local pool hall. In both versions, he says, Keith invited Sells home for dinner. After the meal, Sells was simply planning to move on, but then Keith allegedly triggered his anger by sexually propositioning him, in one account to a threesome with Elaine.

He forced Keith at gunpoint to drive to where later his body was found, killed and mutilated him, then returned to the trailer to kill Elaine and Peter, who were witnesses, although he says it was at the time the result of uncontrollable rage that Keith's alleged sexual offer had set off in him. "I was just so pissed off that I took it to the maximum limit ... Rage don't have a stop button." He implied that it explained why he had killed the infant Elaine had delivered during the crime as well.

In a third version, Sells dispensed with the encounter with Keith and the sexual proposition entirely. According to that account, he got off a freight he had hopped near Ina. When he saw the Dardeen trailer with its "For Sale" sign, he saw an opportunity for a killing. After drinking beers and waiting for the right time, he knocked on the door and told a wary Keith he was interested in buying the trailer. He then overpowered Keith, made him bind and gag his wife and son with duct tape, and forced him to drive his car to the nearby field at gunpoint, where he sliced Keith's penis off, telling him he was going to take it back to Elaine, then shot him and left it there. At the trailer he raped Elaine, then beat Peter, Elaine and the newborn to death. After cleaning up he drove Keith's car to Benton.

=== Doubts about truthfulness ===
To some investigators, Sells' 2014 execution by Texas was justice for the Dardeens as well. He was never charged with their murders, but, "he remains the No. 1 suspect," Jefferson County state's attorney Douglas Hoffman said, a week after the execution. Sheriff Roger Mulch agreed. The county deputy sheriff who interviewed Sells in his Texas cell says he knew details of the crime that had been kept confidential.

But even they agree that Sells may have added details to his story, as he was known to do, something that has left considerable doubt about many of the killings he confessed to. Other investigators are less sure. While Sells' account is consistent with the general facts of the case, they say, most of what he told them had previously been reported publicly.

When Sells was asked about some information that has been withheld from media accounts of the killing, he seemed less reliable. His claim as to which seat of Keith's Plymouth he was shot in is belied by the evidence. And when asked how Elaine's body was positioned, he at first answered incorrectly, then correctly, which may merely have been a lucky guess.

"I know people got their doubts," Sells said in his 2010 interview with The Southern Illinoisan. He responded to some of them: "They say there's no physical evidence tying me to Dardeens, but there wasn't for any of them because they wasn't looking for me. I moved. I was always a transient."

Police in Texas confirmed Sells was responsible for 22 murders, but came to believe that, in conscious imitation of another Texas serial killer, Henry Lee Lucas, he was trying to avoid the death penalty by confessing to crimes he had not committed and taking advantage of the judicial system's gratitude. Their counterparts in Illinois thus wanted to take Sells to Ina so they could see how well he knew the area and the locations relevant to the crimes; he claimed he could lead them to missing evidence. However, Texas law does not allow prisoners on death row to be taken out of state, and authorities there were unwilling to find a way to make an exception. So Duncan declined to file murder charges for lack of sufficient evidence.

Doubts about Sells' confession are not limited to local law enforcement. Friends and family have issues with some of his claims. For one, they doubt that Keith would have invited home someone from out of town whom he had just met to even have dinner with the family, especially given the heightened fear in the area after all the killings over the preceding two years. "If he wouldn't let a young girl in to use the phone, he wouldn't let a 22-year-old man in," said a friend, referring to Sells' age at that time.

They also find Sells' claim that Keith made a sexual advance to him unlikely. They had never perceived him as even possibly having an interest in his own sex, and police did not find any evidence of that during their initial investigation. The detectives who interviewed Sells believe that if he did kill the Dardeens, he invented that detail to make the crime seem more justified; in confessing to other crimes, he often included similar stories to make it seem like the victims had provoked him.

== Joeann Dardeen's change of opinion ==
Joeann Dardeen's position on Sells' guilt has evolved. In 2000, when the confession was first reported, she told the Chicago Tribune that she was as certain as the police that he was the suspect. She believed only talking to him could clear up any lingering doubts. "I have always wanted to know every detail," she said. "Some people may think that's gory. But when someone does something to (my family), I want to know why."

Seven years later, on the 20th anniversary of the killings, a year after Sells' initial execution date had been stayed so a federal appeals court could consider a question about his mental state, she said she was "99 percent sure," and expressed again her interest in possibly talking to Sells. "There's just a little bit of doubt there. Not that he didn't do it; I'm wondering if maybe somebody helped him."

In his 2010 interview, Sells was skeptical of what such a conversation might accomplish. "Joeann wants to talk to me. If she wants to come here and talk to me, scream at me, yell, kick me, hit me, she should have that right," he said. But he said that no apology he could make could possibly give her closure. "[S]orry ain't gonna cut it. So what is there to say? I could tell her sorry every day the rest of my life. It's not going to stop her pain, and one thing I do know about is pain, and it don't go away."

The two never did talk. By the time of Sells' 2014 execution, Joeann had come to believe he was not the man who killed her son, daughter-in-law and grandchildren. "I wanted him to stay alive until I know positively he didn't do it," she told the Associated Press shortly afterward. "[T]he things he said do not match up with what I know about Keith," she told Pat Gauen, the Post-Dispatch reporter who had originally covered the case in 1987. "A lot of people think it's done and over with, but to me it's not."

== See also ==
- List of homicides in Illinois
- Deaths in 1987
- List of murdered American children
- List of unsolved murders (1980–1999)
- Lists of solved missing person cases
- Keddie murders, similar unsolved quadruple homicide in California with victims, including a mother and her children, severely beaten and one victim's body later found elsewhere
