= Ina, Illinois =

- Village
- Location of Ina in Jefferson County, Illinois
- Coordinates: 38°09′00″N 88°54′14″W
- Country: United States
- State: Illinois
- County: Jefferson
- Township: Spring Garden

Area
  - Total: 2.41 sq mi (6.23 km^{2})
  - Land: 2.41 sq mi (6.23 km^{2})
  - Water: 0 sq mi (0.00 km^{2})
- Elevation: 427 ft (130 m)

Population (2020)
  - Total: 1,641
  - Density: 682.3/sq mi (263.45/km^{2})
- Time zone: UTC-6 (CST)
  - Summer (DST): UTC-5 (CDT)
- ZIP code: 62846
- Area code: 618
- FIPS code: 17-37179
- GNIS ID: 2398569
- Website: www.villageofina.com

Ina is a village in Jefferson County, Illinois, United States. The population was 1,641 as of the 2020 census. It is part of the Mount Vernon Micropolitan Statistical Area.

== History ==
Many Cherokee families settled in Ina around 1840. They were apparently refugees from the Trail of Tears. In the 1800s, Ina was jokingly referred to as "the Cherokee Reservation".

The main settlement in this area was Spring Garden, about 3 miles (5 km) northeast of Ina. Spring Garden prospered from 1848 until the Chicago and Eastern Illinois Railroad was built in 1905. After that, the population and business shifted over to the depots at Ina and Bonnie.

=== Crimes ===
An infamous murder case occurred in Ina in 1924, when Rev. Lawrence Hight and his lover Elsie Sweeten poisoned Sweeten's husband in July and Hight's wife in September. Autopsies revealed arsenic. Hight and Sweeten were both sent to prison. Elsie Sweeten was granted another trial and was later acquitted of murder and released from jail.

Over six decades later a quadruple homicide occurred outside of town. The victims were the Dardeen family, who lived in a mobile home on Illinois Route 37 just north of the Franklin County line. One evening in November 1987, the police came to the house since Keith Dardeen had not shown up for his job at the Rend Lake Water Conservancy District treatment plant that morning and did not answer phone calls. Elaine had not been raped, valuable items remained in the house, and police found no reason why anyone might want to have killed the family. Serial killer Tommy Lynn Sells confessed to the crime after he was arrested in Texas in 2000; however, police and the other members of the Dardeen family did not completely believe his accounts, which he changed three times, and he did not seem to know any nonpublic information about the crime. He was never charged before his 2014 execution, and officially the Dardeens' killings remain unsolved.

== Geography ==
Ina is located along Illinois Route 37 which is the village's Main Street, and Interstate 57 runs through the west side of town, with access from Exit 83. Mount Vernon, the Jefferson county seat, is 11 miles (18 km) to the north, and Benton is the same distance to the south.

According to the 2021 census gazetteer files, Ina has a total area of 2.41 square miles (6.24 km^{2}), all land.

Ina is located on high ground between Casey Creek and Gun Creek, both tributaries of the Big Muddy River. The Big Muddy has been dammed to form Rend Lake, with arms of the lake extending up the two tributaries.

Ina is the home of the Big Muddy River Correctional Center. Rend Lake College, with an Ina mailing address, is outside the village limits to the southwest.

== Demographics ==
Historical population
| Census | Pop. | Note | %± |
|---|---|---|---|
| 1900 | 317 | | — |
| 1910 | 484 | | 52.7% |
| 1920 | 398 | | −17.8% |
| 1930 | 458 | | 15.1% |
| 1940 | 501 | | 9.4% |
| 1950 | 432 | | −13.8% |
| 1960 | 332 | | −23.1% |
| 1970 | 333 | | 0.3% |
| 1980 | 460 | | 38.1% |
| 1990 | 489 | | 6.3% |
| 2000 | 2,455 | | 402.0% |
| 2010 | 2,338 | | −4.8% |
| 2020 | 1,641 | | −29.8% |
U.S. Decennial Census

The following population figures for Ina were greatly influenced by the approximately 1,850 male inmates who were included from the Big Muddy River Correctional Center, which had been annexed to the original village.

=== Racial and ethnic composition ===
Ina village, Illinois – Racial and ethnic composition Note: the US Census treats Hispanic/Latino as an ethnic category. This table excludes Latinos from the racial categories and assigns them to a separate category. Hispanics/Latinos may be of any race.
| Race / Ethnicity (NH = Non-Hispanic) | Pop 2000 | Pop 2010 | Pop 2020 | % 2000 | % 2010 | % 2020 |
|---|---|---|---|---|---|---|
| White alone (NH) | 1,258 | 1,289 | 1,054 | 51.24% | 55.13% | 64.23% |
| Black or African American alone (NH) | 1,022 | 811 | 399 | 41.63% | 34.69% | 24.31% |
| Native American or Alaska Native alone (NH) | 7 | 6 | 3 | 0.29% | 0.26% | 0.18% |
| Asian alone (NH) | 6 | 6 | 11 | 0.24% | 0.26% | 0.67% |
| Native Hawaiian or Pacific Islander alone (NH) | 0 | 0 | 0 | 0.00% | 0.00% | 0.00% |
| Other race alone (NH) | 0 | 1 | 1 | 0.00% | 0.04% | 0.06% |
| Mixed race or Multiracial (NH) | 3 | 8 | 35 | 0.12% | 0.34% | 2.13% |
| Hispanic or Latino (any race) | 159 | 217 | 138 | 6.48% | 9.28% | 8.41% |
| Total | 2,455 | 2,338 | 1,641 | 100.00% | 100.00% | 100.00% |

=== 2020 census ===
As of the 2020 census, there were 1,641 people, 190 households, and 125 families residing in the village. The population density was 682.33 inhabitants per square mile (263.45/km^{2}). There were 214 housing units at an average density of 88.98 per square mile (34.36/km^{2}).

The median age was 42.6 years. 6.7% of residents were under the age of 18 and 11.4% were 65 years of age or older. For every 100 females, there were 598.3 males, and for every 100 females age 18 and over there were 723.1 males age 18 and over. 0.0% of residents lived in urban areas, while 100.0% lived in rural areas.

There were 190 households in Ina, of which 28.9% had children under the age of 18 living in them. Of all households, 45.3% were married-couple households, 17.9% were households with a male householder and no spouse or partner present, and 32.1% were households with a female householder and no spouse or partner present. About 30.5% of all households were made up of individuals, and 15.7% had someone living alone who was 65 years of age or older. The average household size was 3.46 and the average family size was 2.62.

Of the 214 housing units, 11.2% were vacant. The homeowner vacancy rate was 0.8% and the rental vacancy rate was 15.4%.

Racial composition as of the 2020 census
| Race | Number | Percent |
|---|---|---|
| White | 1,068 | 65.1% |
| Black or African American | 399 | 24.3% |
| American Indian and Alaska Native | 3 | 0.2% |
| Asian | 11 | 0.7% |
| Native Hawaiian and Other Pacific Islander | 0 | 0.0% |
| Some other race | 120 | 7.3% |
| Two or more races | 40 | 2.4% |

=== Income and poverty ===
The median income for a household in the village was $43,636, and the median income for a family was $57,625. Males had a median income of $38,036 versus $19,167 for females. The per capita income for the village was $4,800. About 12.8% of families and 18.5% of the population were below the poverty line, including 18.5% of those under age 18 and 18.3% of those age 65 or over.

== Education ==
Spring Garden School District 178 operates area schools, including Spring Garden Elementary School (with a Mount Vernon postal address but outside of the city) and Spring Garden Middle School in Ina.
