= Casey Creek =

Casey Creek may refer to:

- Casey Creek (Illinois), a tributary of the Big Muddy River in Illinois, United States
- Casey Creek, Kentucky, an unincorporated community in Adair County, Kentucky, United States
