= Mount Vernon, Illinois =

- City
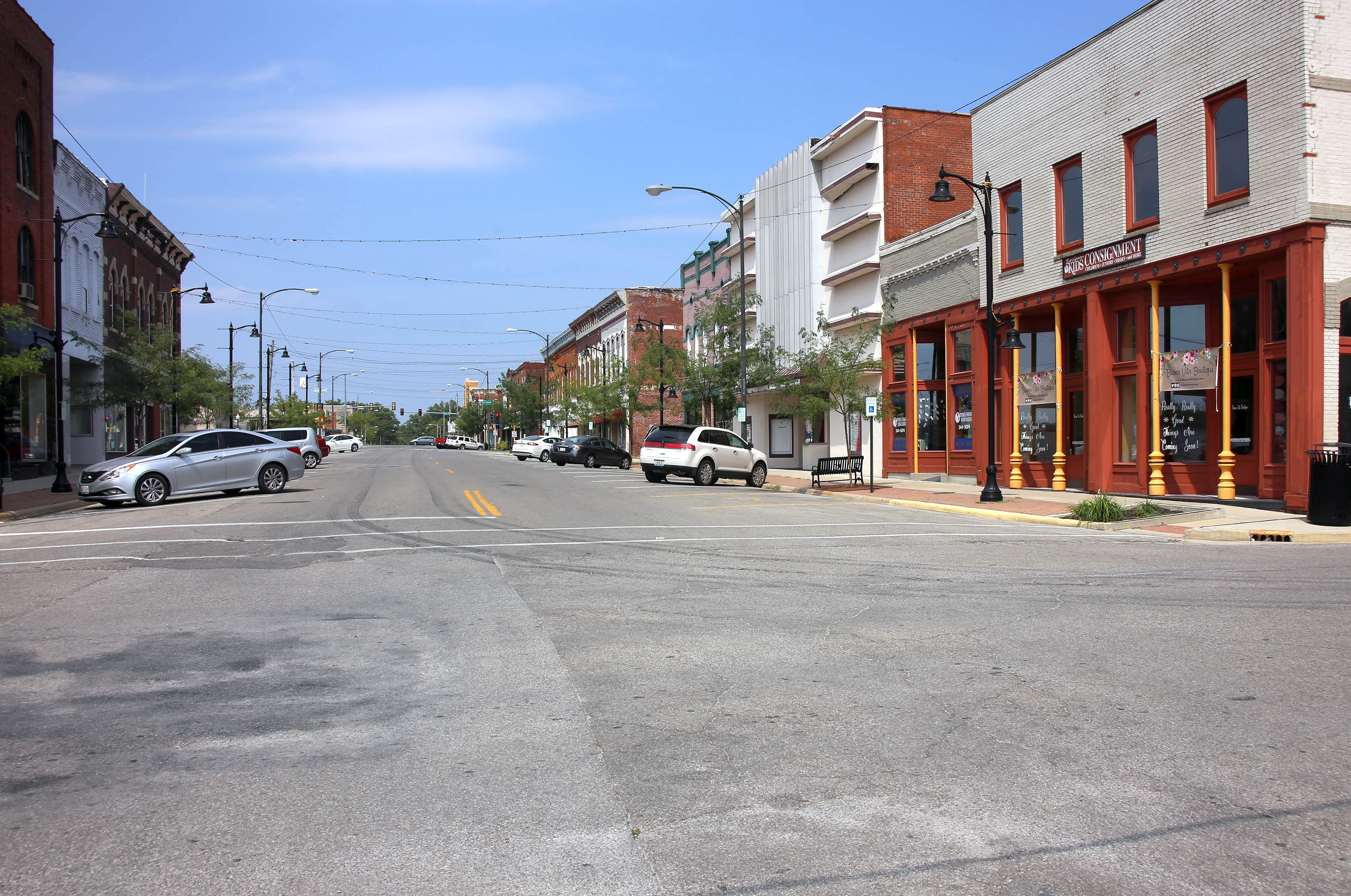
- Town Center of Mount Vernon
- Nicknames: The King City, The Festival City
- Motto: Mount Vernon, City of Opportunity
- Interactive map of Mount Vernon, Illinois
- Location within Illinois Location within the United States
- Coordinates: 38°19′08″N 88°53′12″W
- Country: United States
- State: Illinois
- County: Jefferson
- Townships: Mount Vernon, Shiloh, Dodds, McClellan
- Founded: 1817

Area
  - Total: 14.66 sq mi (37.97 km^{2})
  - Land: 14.58 sq mi (37.77 km^{2})
  - Water: 0.081 sq mi (0.21 km^{2})
- Elevation: 518 ft (158 m)

Population (2020)
  - Total: 14,600
  - Density: 1,001.2/sq mi (386.56/km^{2})
- Time zone: UTC−6 (CST)
  - Summer (DST): UTC−5 (CDT)
- ZIP code: 62864
- Area codes: 618
- FIPS code: 17-51180
- GNIS feature ID: 2395129
- Website: Official website

Mount Vernon is a city in Jefferson County, Illinois, United States, and its county seat. The population was 14,600 at the 2020 census. Mount Vernon is the principal city of the Mount Vernon, Illinois micropolitan area, which includes all of Jefferson and Hamilton counties.

== History ==
=== 19th century ===
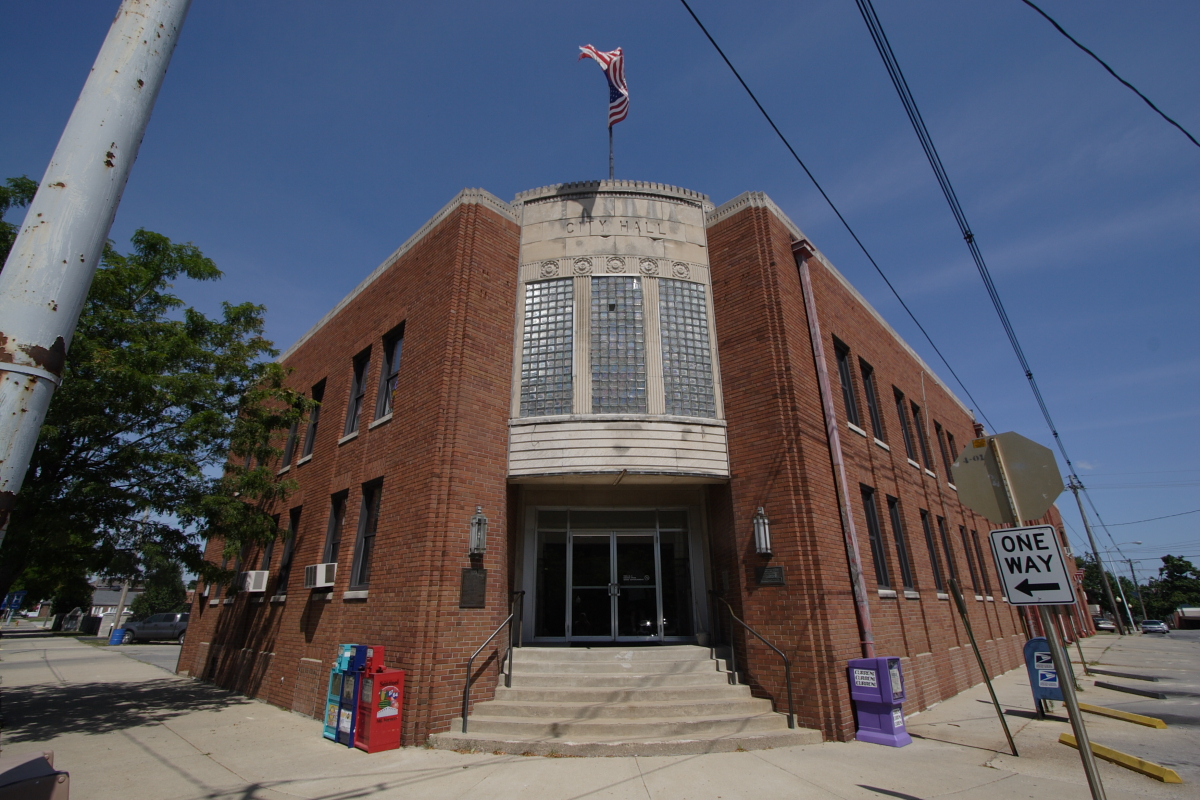
City Hall

Mt. Vernon was founded in 1817 by Zadok Casey, who was elected to the State Senate in 1822 and was elected lieutenant governor in 1833. He served in the U.S. Congress between 1833 and 1843. The town was named for George Washington's plantation, Mount Vernon, which was named for Edward Vernon, a British naval hero.

When the town was founded, there was no road to it. Travelers had to get there by either following the high ground from the north or crossing the swamps from the south. In the early 19th century the Goshen Road crossed Illinois in a northwesterly direction from Old Shawneetown, Illinois to the Goshen Settlement, near what is now Edwardsville. This road was the main road in Illinois. When Mt. Vernon was first settled, the Goshen Road made a wide arc across Jefferson County, crossing Casey Creek and the Big Muddy north of Mt. Vernon, avoiding the swamps to the south, but bypassing Mt. Vernon. The road entered the county at its southeast corner. It passed through, or near, what are now Opdyke, East Salem, Idlewood, Dix and Walnut Hill. However, it was apparent to the early settlers that the town would fail without roads. In 1820–1821, Ben Hood and Carter Wilkey built a bridge over Casey Creek, to the southeast of town. This bridge was near the present bridge on Illinois Route 142. A road was built from there northwest, over ground that is now impassable, toward the old cemetery behind the modern Bethel Cemetery. Deep cuts through the old cemetery attest to the location of the road. From there the road probably followed modern Route 37 into town, somewhere shifting from 10th Street on west to 12th Street.

After the state capital was moved to Vandalia in 1819, it became apparent that a road to Vandalia was needed. A party was sent out to the northwest to mark the road. In 1823, Thomas D. Minor and William Maxwell built the "Vandalia Road", now called the "Old Centralia Road." It runs northwest out of Mt. Vernon to Walnut Hill. Although legend says that this road is crooked because of the drunken state of the surveyors, the path is probably just the natural path of a pioneer road following the terrain. After the bridge and the Vandalia Road were built, Mt. Vernon was "on the map." The bridge across Casey Creek and the Vandalia Road provided a much shorter path across Jefferson County than the original Goshen Road. The new Goshen Road soon captured most of the traffic, and Mt. Vernon became an important stop on the road west.

In 1836, Joshua Grant came to Mt. Vernon from Christian County, Kentucky with several of his sons and daughters. His family was a wealthy slave-owning family, most of whom soon moved to Arkansas, probably because slavery was illegal in Illinois. Joshua left behind several daughters and one son, Angus McNeil Grant, who soon became important in the development of the town. "Upon his arrival, there were but four or five houses in the place, and from that time to the present (1883) he has constantly and ably exerted himself in securing to it the full development of its resources." Angus M. Grant's brother, Joshua Jr. taught school in Mt. Vernon in 1838. Some sources cite him as the first schoolteacher in the town.

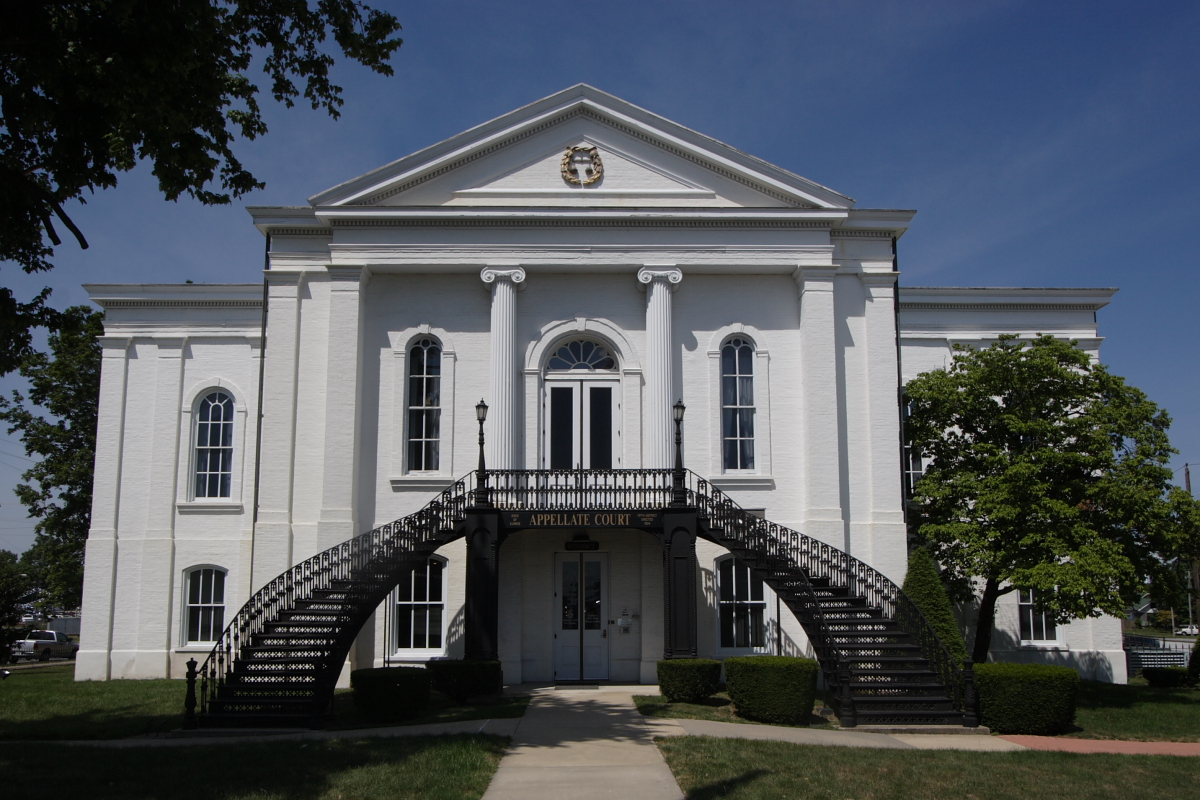
5th District Appellate Court building

Illinois' second constitution went into effect in 1848, replacing the 1818 constitution and reducing the Supreme Court to three divisions: the first (southern), second (central) and third (northern) areas of the state. The first division was relocated to Mt. Vernon, and what is now known as the 5th District Appellate Court building was constructed in 1854 to house them until all supreme court sessions were moved to Springfield in 1897. The building joined the National Register of Historic Places list in 1973 for its Greek Revival architecture, and as of 2026 it still houses the 5th District Appellate Court.

In the 1870s, Mt. Vernon for a time prohibited the sale of alcohol. A village called "East Mt. Vernon" was organized in 1877 to allow the sale of alcohol. A court fight eventually held that the village was organized illegally. Mt. Vernon then voted alcohol back in, and the area of East Mt. Vernon was annexed into the city.

On February 19, 1888, a tornado cut a path a half mile wide through Mt. Vernon, killing 37 people and destroying more than 450 houses. The Jefferson County Courthouse was destroyed. This event was one of the first disasters to which the American Red Cross responded. Clara Barton herself directed the relief efforts.

The Mt. Vernon Car Manufacturing Company opened in 1889 after moving from Litchfield, Illinois. This relocation may have been an outgrowth of the relief efforts following the tornado. The Louisville and Nashville Railroad hauled in some 1,900 carloads of supplies for reconstruction of the town. Somehow, this effort translated into a major business building railroad cars, at first building about ten cars per day. By 1909, the car shops were producing 25 cars per day, employing more than 1000 workers, with a payroll of $60,000 per month.

=== 20th and 21st centuries ===
During World War II, portions of the "Car Shops", as they had to come to be known, were converted over to wartime production, including the production of bomb casings. Around 1939, a portion of the car shops was purchased by Precision Engineering, which originally built components for locomotives. During the 1970s, this company purchased old diesel/electric railroad locomotives, which it scrapped out or refurbished. Today, the plant thrives as a hub for National Railway Equipment Company which rebuilds and services diesel electric locomotives for rail lines across the globe.

In 1954, the car shops closed, causing a temporary jump in unemployment throughout the city and the 108 communities called "home" by its former employees.

The Interstate Highway System was built in the late 1950s and 1960s. The concurrency of I-57 and I-64 is along the western border of the ridgeline which divides the Big Muddy River and Casey Creek. The stack interchange on the southwest side of town complements the historic Casey Creek bridges, allowing much shorter travel times through the swamps to the east and south.

In April 2007, Mount Vernon voters elected the first female mayor of the city, Mary Jane Chesley. She was sworn into office on May 7, 2007.

In November 2024, the Southern Illinois Manufacturing Academy opened in Mount Vernon. The facility cost $5 million to build and is a partnership of three community colleges in the Southern Illinois region, including Rend Lake College, Kaskaskia College, and Southeastern Illinois College. The academy provides training in a variety of fields and covers an area of roughly 22,000 square feet.

== Geography ==
According to the 2010 census, Mount Vernon has a total area of 13.151 square miles (34.06 km^{2}), of which 13.07 square miles (33.85 km^{2}) (or 99.38%) is land and 0.081 square miles (0.21 km^{2}) (or 0.62%) is water.

The community is about 65 miles (105 km) east of St. Louis, Missouri.

Mt. Vernon is located on high ground between Casey Creek and the Big Muddy River, which join south of the town in what is now Rend Lake. In pre-settlement times the area around these waterways was a swamp, a heavily forested area that was waist-deep in water during much of the winter and during wet summers. Mt. Vernon was thus often surrounded by water and swamp on three sides.

High ground was located to the north of Mt. Vernon. A ridge ran between the Big Muddy River and Casey Creek north toward what is now Dix.

There are high places both west and east of Mt. Vernon from which one can see the town as a forested point of high ground jutting out into the bottoms. These high places are: from the west, near the Woodlawn interchange off Interstate 64 and from the east, on Old Fairfield Road near Summersville School, with the highest point located on Old Route 15 right before it merges with New Route 15, near Bluford.

=== Climate ===
Climate data for Mount Vernon 3 NE, Illinois (1991–2020 normals, extremes 1895–present)
Month	Jan	Feb	Mar	Apr	May	Jun	Jul	Aug	Sep	Oct	Nov	Dec	Year
Record high °F (°C)	75 (24)	79 (26)	92 (33)	91 (33)	99 (37)	105 (41)	114 (46)	111 (44)	105 (41)	96 (36)	86 (30)	78 (26)	114 (46)
Mean daily maximum °F (°C)	38.5 (3.6)	43.6 (6.4)	53.6 (12.0)	64.9 (18.3)	73.8 (23.2)	82.4 (28.0)	85.7 (29.8)	84.8 (29.3)	78.6 (25.9)	67.5 (19.7)	53.7 (12.1)	42.9 (6.1)	64.2 (17.9)
Daily mean °F (°C)	30.1 (−1.1)	34.3 (1.3)	43.7 (6.5)	54.5 (12.5)	64.4 (18.0)	73.1 (22.8)	76.5 (24.7)	74.8 (23.8)	67.7 (19.8)	56.1 (13.4)	44.0 (6.7)	34.5 (1.4)	54.5 (12.5)
Mean daily minimum °F (°C)	21.7 (−5.7)	25.0 (−3.9)	33.8 (1.0)	44.1 (6.7)	55.0 (12.8)	63.7 (17.6)	67.3 (19.6)	64.8 (18.2)	56.7 (13.7)	44.7 (7.1)	34.2 (1.2)	26.1 (−3.3)	44.8 (7.1)
Record low °F (°C)	−21 (−29)	−22 (−30)	−10 (−23)	17 (−8)	29 (−2)	36 (2)	46 (8)	42 (6)	23 (−5)	18 (−8)	−5 (−21)	−19 (−28)	−22 (−30)
Average precipitation inches (mm)	2.60 (66)	2.62 (67)	4.00 (102)	4.96 (126)	5.06 (129)	4.84 (123)	3.78 (96)	3.33 (85)	3.37 (86)	3.53 (90)	3.99 (101)	2.89 (73)	44.97 (1,142)
Average snowfall inches (cm)	3.2 (8.1)	3.1 (7.9)	1.0 (2.5)	0.0 (0.0)	0.0 (0.0)	0.0 (0.0)	0.0 (0.0)	0.0 (0.0)	0.0 (0.0)	0.2 (0.51)	0.4 (1.0)	2.5 (6.4)	10.4 (26)
Average precipitation days (≥ 0.01 in)	8.9	8.3	10.9	11.1	13.1	10.1	8.7	8.4	7.6	8.5	9.4	9.5	114.5
Average snowy days (≥ 0.1 in)	1.8	1.7	0.5	0.0	0.0	0.0	0.0	0.0	0.0	0.1	0.3	1.0	5.4
Source: NOAA

== Demographics ==
Historical population
Census	Pop.	Note	%±
1860	707		—
1870	1,167		65.1%
1880	2,324		99.1%
1890	3,233		39.1%
1900	5,216		61.3%
1910	8,007		53.5%
1920	9,815		22.6%
1930	12,375		26.1%
1940	14,724		19.0%
1950	15,600		5.9%
1960	15,566		−0.2%
1970	16,270		4.5%
1980	17,193		5.7%
1990	16,988		−1.2%
2000	16,269		−4.2%
2010	15,277		−6.1%
2020	14,600		−4.4%
U.S. Decennial Census

=== 2020 census ===
As of the 2020 census, Mount Vernon had a population of 14,600. The median age was 38.4 years. 23.5% of residents were under the age of 18 and 19.9% of residents were 65 years of age or older. For every 100 females there were 91.5 males, and for every 100 females age 18 and over there were 88.4 males age 18 and over.

97.1% of residents lived in urban areas, while 2.9% lived in rural areas.

There were 6,297 households in Mount Vernon, of which 27.9% had children under the age of 18 living in them. Of all households, 32.2% were married-couple households, 22.7% were households with a male householder and no spouse or partner present, and 36.5% were households with a female householder and no spouse or partner present. About 38.0% of all households were made up of individuals and 16.4% had someone living alone who was 65 years of age or older.

There were 7,231 housing units, of which 12.9% were vacant. The homeowner vacancy rate was 4.4% and the rental vacancy rate was 11.6%.

Racial composition as of the 2020 census
Race	Number	Percent
White	10,738	73.5%
Black or African American	2,234	15.3%
American Indian and Alaska Native	54	0.4%
Asian	272	1.9%
Native Hawaiian and Other Pacific Islander	4	0.0%
Some other race	166	1.1%
Two or more races	1,132	7.8%
Hispanic or Latino (of any race)	498	3.4%

=== 2010 census ===
The 2010 population density was 1,168.7 inhabitants per square mile (451.2/km^{2}). There were 7,534 housing units. The racial makeup of the city was 80.6% White, 14.7% African American, 0.3% Native American, 1% Asian, 0.0% Pacific Islander, and 2.6% from two or more races. Hispanic or Latino of any race were 2.4% of the population.

There were 6,702 households, out of which 25.8% had children under the age of 18 living with them, 35% of all households were married couples living together, 16.3% had a female householder with no husband present, and 43.6% were non-families. 37.6% of all households were made up of individuals, and 16.1% had someone living alone who was 65 years of age or older. The average household size was 2.23 and the average family size was 2.92.

In the city the population was spread out, with 24.3% under the age of 18, 6.2% from 20 to 24, and 18% who were 65 years of age or older. The median age was 38.3 years. Males represent 46.5% of the population, and 34% of the population was male and over 18. Women were 53.5% of the population, 41% of the population being female and over 18.

The median income for a household in the city was $32,549, and the median income for a family was $36,660. Males had a median income of $28,324 versus $16,497 for females. The per capita income for the city was $21,283. About 19.9% of families and 23.7% of the population were below the poverty line, including 35.4% of those under age 18 and 11.7% of that age 65 or over. 53.9% of households earn less than $35,000.

Of the population over age 25, 72.7% have no college degree. 13.6% of those over 25 have no high school diploma nor equivalent. 7.6% of the population has a bachelor's degree or higher.

According to the US Census, health care services and social services employ the second most people with 1,001 estimated jobs. Accommodation and food services (restaurants) are the highest employer with 1,146 estimated jobs.

=== Crime ===
Crime Data as reported by MVPD within Illinois Annual Uniform Crime Report. (Offenses Known to Law Enforcement)
Year	State	Months	Population	Rate per 100,000	Criminal homicide	Rape	Robbery	Aggravated assault	Burglary	Larceny-theft	Motor vehicle theft	Arson
2019	IL	12	14,802	6,438.3	3	18	17	176	102	608	21	8
2020	IL	12	14,802	5,580.3	0	11	24	136	142	490	16	7
2021	IL	12	14,802	918.8	1	17	6	136	74	434	17	5

Illinois Annual Uniform Crime Report is an index of aggregate data for select categories of crime. It is maintained and published by Illinois State Police (ISP) 2019 2020 2021 2022/2023

== Economy ==
Mount Vernon hosts a 48-acre (190,000 m^{2}) facility for Continental Tire the Americas. It is also home to major distribution centers for NAPA, National Railway Equipment (NREC), ALCO and IPT (subsidiaries of NREC), along with many other smaller industries which are located in or in close proximity to the city's three industrial parks. There is discussion of creating a fourth industrial park which is to be used for distribution centers in the area of the new interchange, this park would encompass 100 acres (0.40 km^{2}) and would be eligible for Tax Increment Financing and Enterprise Zone benefits.

Two new TIF (Tax Increment Financing) districts have been created, one TIF is at Exit 95 and is a conservation/industrial use. Exit 94 is an Industrial Park Conservation TIF. Pepsi has built a new service and distribution center that was completed in March 2011, it is located off of the Davidson Avenue extension.

=== Top employers ===
2023 Annual Comprehensive Financial Report
Employer	# of Employees
Continental Tires the Americas	3,496
Walgreens Distribution Center	2,138
Good Samaritan Hospital	1,484
National Railway Equipment Company	376
Crossroads Community Hospital	290
Mount Vernon City Schools, District 80	283
Rend Lake College	261
Spero Family Services	197
Jefferson County (government)	178
Mt. Vernon Township High School	171

The Annual Comprehensive Financial Report (Audit) contains supplemental opinions and audit information from an Independent audit firm. The independent audit firm in 2023 was Roth&Co, a Chicago-based audit firm. Data for prior years located below.

2022
Employer	# of Employees
Continental Tires the Americas	3,496
Walgreens Distribution Center	2,138
Good Samaritan Hospital	1,484
National Railway Equipment Company	376
Crossroads Community Hospital	290
Mount Vernon City Schools, District 80	283
Rend Lake College	261
Spero Family Services	197
Jefferson County (government)	178
Mt. Vernon Township High School	171
City of Mount Vernon (government)	139
Kroger	130
Peoples National Bank	102
Genuine Parts/NAPA Distribution Center	90
Durham Bus Service	84
Orthopaedic Center of Southern Illinois	78
Medline Physicians Filing	77
Magnum Steel Works	50

2021
Employer	# of Employees
Continental Tires the Americas	3,496
Walgreens Distribution Center	2,138
Good Samaritan Hospital	1,484
National Railway Equipment Company	376
Crossroads Community Hospital	290
Mount Vernon City Schools, District 80	283
Rend Lake College	261
Spero Family Services	197
Jefferson County (government)	178
Mt. Vernon Township High School	171
City of Mount Vernon (government)	139
Kroger	130
Peoples National Bank	102
Genuine Parts/NAPA Distribution Center	90
Durham Bus Service	84
Orthopaedic Center of Southern Illinois	78
Medline Physicians Filing	77
Magnum Steel Works	50

== Arts and culture ==
Mount Vernon is home to the Cedarhurst Center for the Arts, a 90-acre visual and performing arts institution. Cedarhurst celebrates the arts year-round with visual and performing arts programs for the public. The Cedarhurst Craft Fair was held yearly in early September on the grounds. The craft fair ended in 2025. In addition to its programs on property, the Mitchell Museum is located on the Cedarhurst grounds.

The city is host to an event the first Saturday of each month from April through October called Market Days. This is an open-air market held near downtown and is similar to a craft fair or flea market.

There is also the Jefferson County Historical Museum and Village located within incorporated Mount Vernon. The Museum and the Village reflect life in Jefferson County from the mid-19th century to more recent years.

The C.E.Brehm Memorial Public Library, a Carnegie Library built in 1905, is a source of information to the community and is located downtown.

Beatles guitarist George Harrison bought a guitar from Fenton's Music store in Mt. Vernon in 1963 while he was visiting his sister in nearby Benton, Illinois. The guitar sold at auction for $657,000 in 2014.

== Parks and recreation ==
- Mount Vernon has multiple community parks with varying amenities.

== Government ==
=== Local government ===
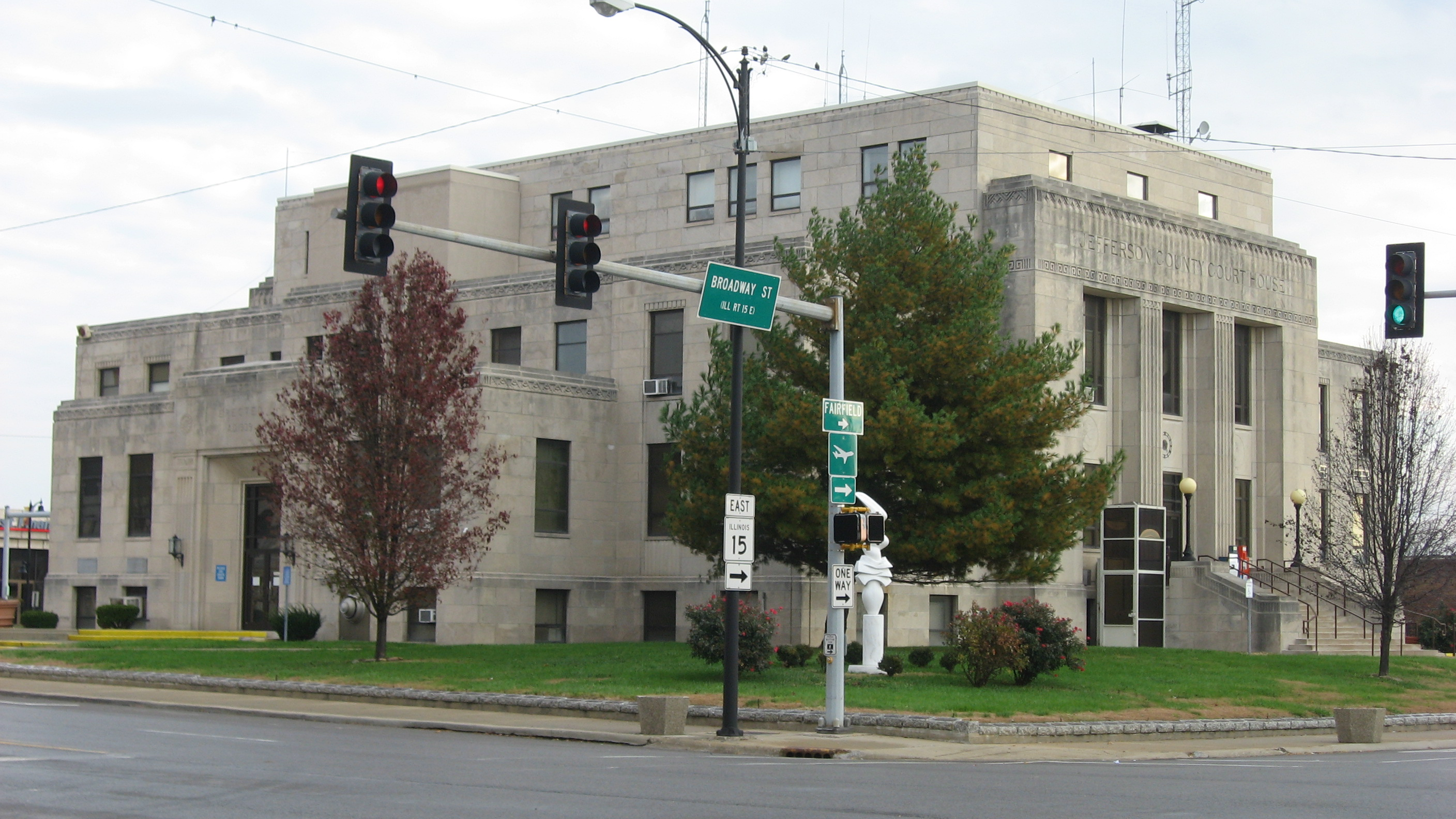
Jefferson County Courthouse

The city of Mount Vernon uses a Council-manager government with a mayor. The Mt. Vernon City Council meets regularly on the first and third Mondays each month. Meetings are moved to the following Tuesday if the first or third Monday falls on a holiday.

The elective officers of the City of Mt. Vernon shall be a Mayor, four Councilmen, a City Clerk, and a City Treasurer. At the general election for City officers to be starting in January 1969 and every four years thereafter, there shall be elected a Mayor, City Clerk, City Treasurer, and two Councilmen. At the general election held in 1967 and every two years thereafter, two Councilmen shall be elected. The mayor is John Lewis.

== Education ==
Mount Vernon City Schools operates elementary and middle schools. There are four education centers operated by School District 80 within the city:

- Dr. Andy Hall Early Childhood Center (preschool)
- Mount Vernon City Schools Primary Center (K-3)
- J.L. Buford Intermediate Education Center (grades 4 and 5)
- Zadok Casey Middle School (grades 6–8)

Summersville Grade School of Summersville School District 79 is a public grade school located on the east side of Mt. Vernon (grades K-8)

Mount Vernon Township High School is the community high school.

== Media ==
=== Newspapers ===
- Mt. Vernon Morning Sentinel - daily newspaper located within the city that covers local, countywide, and regional news.
- Mt. Vernon Register-News - a newspaper that served Mount Vernon, and published its last edition on February 6, 2018; the following day, CNHI announced the closure of both the Register-News and the McLeansboro Times-Leader.

=== Radio ===
- WMIX (AM) is an AM frequency radio station operating at 940 kHz hosting a talk radio format.
- WMIX-FM is an FM radio station with a country music format on 94.1 MHz.
- WDML is an FM radio station with an adult rock & roll format on 106.9 MHz.

=== Television ===
- WPXS is a television station broadcasting north of Mount Vernon operating on digital channel 21 and virtual channel 13.

== Infrastructure ==
=== Transportation ===
==== Roads and highways ====
- I-57 runs north and south and is local
- I-64 runs east and west and is local
- IL 37 runs north and south and is local
- IL 15 runs east and west and is local
- IL 142
- IL 148

Interstate 57 enters Mt. Vernon with a concurrency with Interstate 64 coming from Louisville. It makes a 2-diamond interchange exit with the city's main exits. Its first exit is Veterans Memorial Drive and IL-15 towards Mt. Vernon and Ashley. Interstate 64 then exits the concurrency going west to St. Louis and Interstate 57 remains on its own until it reaches Effingham for its second concurrency.

==== Airports ====
- The Mount Vernon Airport has a 6,500-foot main runway, fixed-base operation, terminal building and storage hangars. Charter and private aviation services are provided, as well as refueling. The facility offers Shell 100 and Jet A fuels and pilot lounge with a weight and exercise room, shower and snooze rooms, wireless internet in the airport terminal, complimentary refreshments, courtesy shuttle, as well as overnight hangar reservations.
- MidAmerica Airport, a cargo airport approximately 45 miles from Mt. Vernon, located in Mascoutah, Illinois along Interstate 64.

==== Railroad service ====
- Evansville Western CSX
- Norfolk Southern
- Union Pacific
- Burlington Northern Santa Fe

==== Motor freight ====
- UPS Freight
- FedEx Freight
- Direct Motor Freight

==== Bus service ====
- Greyhound
- South Central Illinois Mass Transit District

== Notable people ==
- Dwight Bernard, pitcher for the Milwaukee Brewers and New York Mets
- Ray Blades, left fielder for the St. Louis Cardinals; manager for the Cardinals and Brooklyn Dodgers
- Paul W. Broyles, businessman and Illinois state legislator
- Louis Emmerson, 29th Governor of Illinois from 1929 to 1933
- Randy Fenoli, television presenter and fashion designer
- Crista Flanagan, comedic actress, roles including MADtv and Mad Men
- Reed Green, Illinois lawyer and politician
- Nate Hawthorne, former NBA player for Los Angeles Lakers and Phoenix Suns
- Michael Hicks, independent game designer and musician
- Walt Kirk, University of Illinois and pro basketball player
- Jeane Kirkpatrick, first woman to serve as United States Ambassador to the United Nations
- Clyde Lee, Illinois state legislator and businessman
- Ben Moses, TV producer, writer, director, filmmaker
- William L. O'Daniel, Illinois state legislator and farmer
- Charles W. Pavey, Illinois businessman and politician
- Tazewell B. Tanner, Illinois state representative, judge, and newspaper editor
- Kenny Troutt, founder and CEO, Excel Communications
- Albert Watson, Illinois Supreme Court Justice
- Albert Watson, II, US Army lieutenant general during World War II
- Jane Willis, attorney, partner at Ropes & Gray and member of blackjack team
- Mary Beth Zimmerman, golfer
