= Spring Garden Elementary School =

Spring Garden Elementary School may refer to:

- Spring Garden Elementary School, Spring Garden School District 178, Mount Vernon, Illinois
- Spring Garden Elementary School, Carroll County Public Schools, Hampstead, Maryland
- Spring Garden Elementary School, Nutley, New Jersey
- Spring Garden School, Philadelphia, Pennsylvania
- Spring Garden Elementary School, Bethlehem Area School District, Bethlehem, Pennsylvania
- Spring Garden Elementary School, Hurst-Euless-Bedford Independent School District, Bedford, Texas
