= Mount Vernon City School District =

Mount Vernon City School District or Mount Vernon City Schools may refer to:

- Mount Vernon City School District (New York), a district in New York state
- Mount Vernon City School District (Ohio), a district in Ohio
- Mount Vernon City Schools (Illinois)

== See also ==
Mount Vernon High School (disambiguation)
