= Vilchis =

Vilchis is a surname. Notable people with the surname include:

- Catalina Diaz Vilchis (born 1964), Mexican weightlifter
- José Vilchis (born 1950), Mexican gymnast
- Rodolfo Vilchis (born 1989), Mexican footballer
