= Reed Green =

Reed Green may refer to:

- Reed Green (American football)
- Reed Green (politician)
