= Little Grand Canyon =

Canyon and natural landmark in Illinois, USA

The Little Grand Canyon (officially named Grand Canyon) is a box canyon located in Shawnee National Forest in Jackson County, Illinois, United States, south of Murphysboro. It is located on the east bank of the Big Muddy River across from Turkey Bayou to the west, between Swallow Rock to the north and Chalk Bluff to the south. Access to the park is gained from Hickory Ridge Road to the east. The area was designated a National Natural Landmark in February 1980.

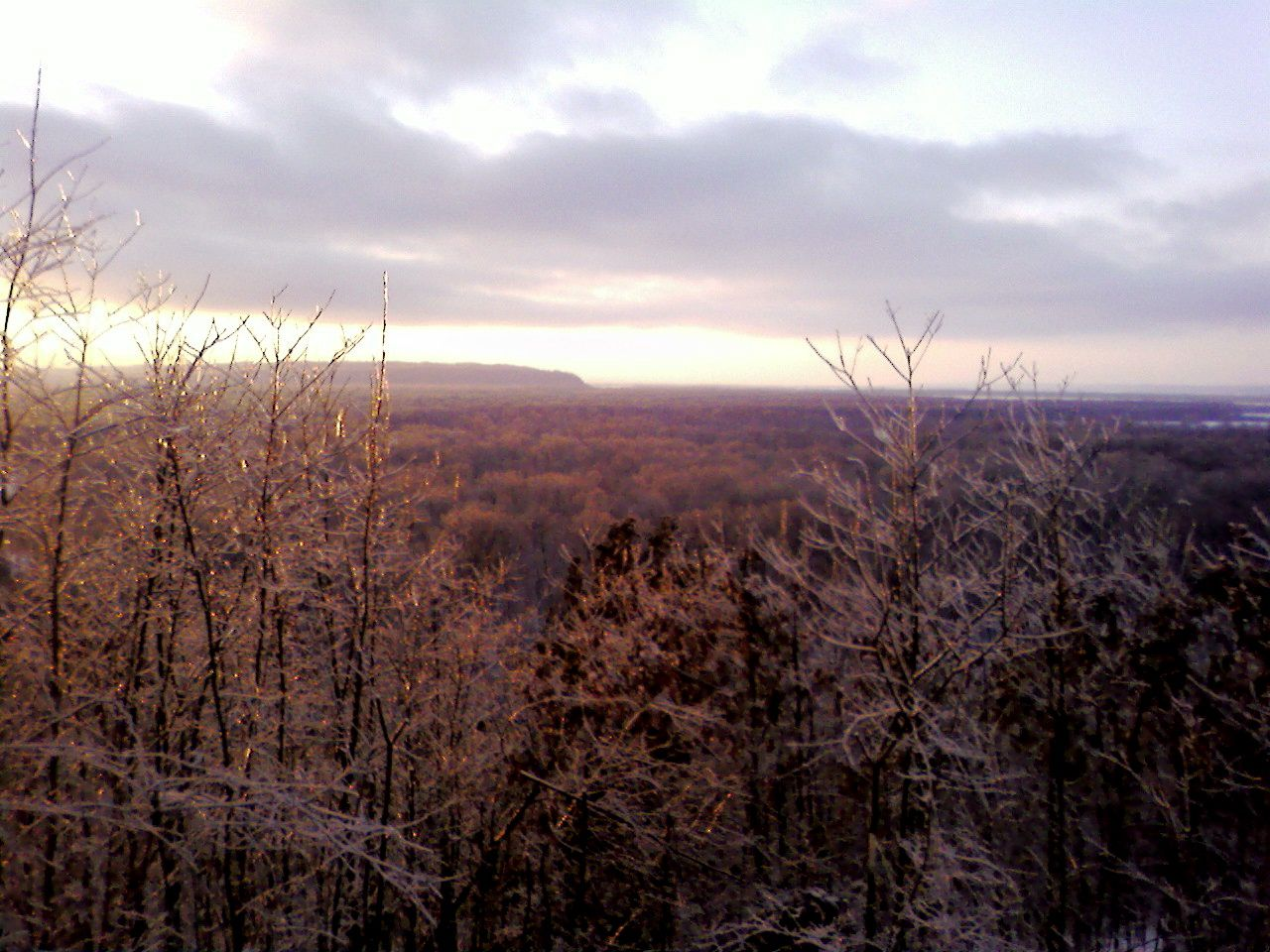
Little Grand Canyon

== Description ==
Erosion carved this deep box canyon from the sandstone of the Shawnee Hills, opening into the floodplain of the Mississippi River near Turkey Bayou. The canyon contains several seasonal and a few permanent waterfalls, some descending through dramatic cascades of sculpted sandstone. The 3.6-mile (5.8 km) trail is marked by white diamond blazes and begins in the upland hardwood forest. The trail then descends through a steep and sometimes slippery sandstone side canyon to the lusher, damper habitat of the canyon floor. The ascent from the canyon requires a small amount of climbing at the Three Sisters Waterfall. Stone steps on parts of the trail were constructed by the Civilian Conservation Corps, not by Native Americans as some believe. There is an approximate 350-foot (110 m) difference in elevation between the bottom of the canyon and the trailhead. The trailhead facilities include a picnic area and pit toilet. No water is available. Hikers should be aware of unmarked and unguarded cliff edges and the possibility of flash floods during heavy rain.

The area was known in the 1930s as both the "Hanging Gardens of Egypt" and "Rattlesnake Den". These names were references to the abundance of wildflowers in the canyon and one of the best rattlesnake dens in the United States, respectively. However, excessive collection of rattlesnakes greatly reduced their populations.

There are a number of Little Grand Canyons across America, including this one in Jackson County, Illinois; another in Lumpkin, Georgia; and another in Emery County, Utah.
