= Spring Garden School District 178 =

School district in Jefferson County, Illinois, United States

Address
- 14975 East Bakerville Road Mount Vernon, Illinois, 62864; United States

District information
- Type: Public
- Grades: PreK–8
- NCES District ID: 1701419

Students and staff
- Students: 239

Other information
- Website: www.sgd178.org

Spring Garden School District 178 or Spring Garden Grade School is a school district in Illinois. It operates Spring Garden Elementary School with a Mount Vernon postal address and outside of the city), and Spring Garden Middle School in Ina.
