= Tommy Lynn Sells =

American serial killer (1964–2014)

- Sells's mugshot in Val Verde County, January 2000
- Born: June 28, 1964; Oakland, California, U.S.
- Died: April 3, 2014 (aged 49); Huntsville Unit, Texas, U.S.
- Other name: The Coast-to-Coast Killer
- Status: Executed by lethal injection
- Convictions: Missouri; Felony theft Driving under the influence Wyoming; Grand theft auto Malicious wounding Texas; Capital murder (2 counts) (September 18, 2000, and September 2003)
- Penalty: Missouri; 2 years Wyoming; 2 years (Vehicle theft); 2–10 years (Malicious wounding); Texas; Death (September 20, 2000); Life imprisonment (September 11, 2003)

Details
- Victims: 22 confirmed 70+ claimed
- Span of crimes: July 5, 1979 – December 31, 1999
- Country: United States
- States: Missouri, New York, Illinois, Texas, Kentucky, possibly others
- Date apprehended: January 2, 2000

Tommy Lynn Sells (June 28, 1964 – April 3, 2014) was an American serial killer who became known as the Coast to Coast Killer. Although he was convicted of only two murders, one of which led to his being sentenced to death and eventual execution, Sells claimed to have killed up to 70 victims in various states. Investigators have been able to conclusively implicate Sells in at least 22 cases.

== Early life ==
Sells was born in Oakland, California, on June 28, 1964, as one of five children to an unwed mother. Sells's presumed biological father, Joe Lovins, died when Sells was 11.

Sells and his twin sister, Tammy Jean, contracted meningitis when they were 18 months old; Tammy died from the illness. Shortly thereafter Sells was sent to live with his aunt, Bonnie Walpole, in Holcomb, Missouri. When he was five he was returned to his mother after she discovered that Walpole wanted to adopt him.

At the age of seven Sells began regularly drinking alcohol obtained from a supply stash belonging to his maternal grandfather. Within a year he was socializing with an adult man named Willis Clark, who Sells alleged began molesting him. Sells claimed his mother encouraged the abuse, which traumatized him greatly. Sells said he would later relive those experiences while committing his crimes.

At age ten Sells started using narcotics. Three years later he entered his grandmother's bed nude while she was sleeping, leading to him being banned from the house. Shortly after that his mother and siblings abandoned him by abruptly leaving town. A few days later, in a fit of rage, he shot a woman and assaulted her, although she survived. Sells began living as a nomad permanently in 1978 at the age of 14. When Sells visited family in Little Rock, Arkansas, in May 1981, his mother threw him out after he tried to molest her in the shower. Thereafter he failed to receive mental health assistance and his drinking worsened, leading to his first arrest in 1982 for public intoxication.

== Criminal history and psychology ==
Homeless, Sells hitchhiked and train-hopped across the United States from 1978 to 1999, committing various crimes along the way. He held several very short-term manual labor and barber jobs. He drank heavily, abused drugs, and was imprisoned several times. In 1990, Sells stole a truck in Wyoming and was sentenced to 16 months' imprisonment. He was diagnosed with personality disorders, addictions, and psychosis.

On May 13, 1992, Fabienne Witherspoon, a 19-year-old woman in Charleston, West Virginia, was driving when she saw Sells panhandling under an overpass with a sign that said, "I will work for food." She felt sorry for him and took him to her home, asking him to wait outside. She went into her home to get some food for him, and by the time she got back to her front door, he was inside. When she walked away to get something else, he got a knife from her kitchen, trapped her in a bathroom, and attempted to rape her. She hit him in the head repeatedly with a ceramic duck, got control of his knife, and stabbed him, nicking his kidney and liver. In addition, his testicle was sliced. In retaliation, Sells beat her over the head with a piano stool. Sells tried to get away but his injuries landed him in the ICU and in police custody. Witherspoon sustained significant injuries herself including a gaping head wound and a severe hand laceration that required surgery. After this attack Sells took a plea deal on malicious wounding charges and served five years in prison. While serving this sentence, he was diagnosed with bipolar disorder and married Nora Price. He was released in 1997 and moved to Tennessee with his wife. He then left her that same year and resumed his cross-country travels.

== Murders ==
Police investigators believe Sells murdered at least 22 people. Retired Texas Ranger John Allen said: "We did confirm 22 ... I know there's more. I know there's a lot more. Obviously, we won't ever know." Sells said he committed his first murder at age 15 in Mississippi after breaking into a house. Sells claimed that, while in the house, he discovered a man performing fellatio on a boy and killed the man in a fit of rage. This confessed crime has not been confirmed. Sells further claimed that he killed a man in 1980 with an ice pick near a Chinese restaurant in Los Angeles, which has also never been confirmed.

Nonetheless, Sells has either been linked to or has confessed to a number of murders and other violent crimes.

- July 5, 1979, Port Gibson, Mississippi: John Cade, 39, was killed with a .32 caliber pistol during a home invasion. Near the crime scene, a man who resembled Sells was observed. He may have been in the area around this period, according to investigators.
- April 27, 1982, St. Louis, Missouri: In November 2015, Melissa DeBoer contacted police after watching an episode of Crime Watch Daily which featured Sells. In 1982, DeBoer's mother, JoAnne Tate, 35, was murdered in her St. Louis home; Melissa DeBoer's testimony as a seven-year-old assaulted in the sexual attack helped identify Rodney Lincoln as the killer. However, DeBoer came to believe Sells, not Lincoln, murdered her mother in 1982. In 2018, Missouri Governor Eric Greitens commuted Lincoln's sentence to time served and he was released from prison.
- July 31, 1983, St. Louis, Missouri: Tiffany Gill, 4, and Colleen Gill, 33, were discovered at their house on Washington Terrace in the West End neighbourhood. They had both been battered to death with a blunt weapon. A man matching Sells's description was seen leaving the crime scene. Sells, who at the time of the double homicide resided in the 3300 block of Edmundson Road in Breckenbridge Hills, had relatives who lived in the St. Louis region.
- July 26, 1985, Springfield, Missouri: In July 1985, 21-year-old Sells worked at a Forsyth carnival, where he met 28-year-old Ena Cordt and her four-year-old son Rory Cordt. Cordt invited Sells to her home that evening. According to Sells, he had sex with her, fell asleep, and awoke to find her stealing from his backpack. He proceeded to beat Cordt to death with her son's baseball bat. He then murdered her son because the child was a potential witness. The bludgeoned bodies were found three days later, by which time Sells had left town.
- May 1, 1987, Lockport, New York: Suzanne Korcz, 27, disappeared after leaving a Lockport nightclub alone. Her body was found on September 5, 1995, at the foot of an embankment near Niagara Falls, two miles away. Her cause of death was unknown due to decomposition. In 2004, Sells confessed that he had murdered a woman in the area at the time, and his presence in the city was confirmed; he was even able to identify her and photographs from the crime scene. Since he had already been sentenced to death, he was not prosecuted.
- October 15, 1987, Lovelock, Nevada: Stefanie Kelly Stroh, 21, was last seen at the Four Way Café and Truck Stop in Wells, Nevada. Sells confessed to Stroh's murder. He said he picked her up while she was hitchhiking after he offered her a ride to Reno, Nevada. They took LSD together, then he strangled her in Lovelock, covered her body in concrete, and dumped it in a hot spring. Her body was never found.
- November 17, 1987, Ina, Illinois: Sells confessed to the murders of four members of the Dardeen family. The body of Keith Dardeen, 29, while originally thought to be the suspect, was found in a nearby field. Dardeen's body had three gunshots to the head and had been emasculated. Keith's three-year-old son, Peter Dardeen, was bludgeoned to death and Sells also attacked Elaine Dardeen, Keith's 30-year-old pregnant wife. It was such a severe beating, she went into labor and gave birth to her daughter; Sells beat the newborn to death.
- December 18, 1988, Tucson, Arizona: Kent Alan Lauten, 51, was stabbed and buried in a shallow grave near a homeless camp. Sells claimed he killed Lauten because he refused to pay for drugs. His body was found two days later.
- December 9, 1991, Marianna, Florida: Teresa Hall, 25, and her daughter, five-year-old Tiffany Hall, were both bludgeoned to death with a wooden table leg in their home. The killer had kicked the front door in, smashed a wooden table to pieces, and used one of the legs as a murder weapon. Serial killer Ángel Maturino Reséndiz was suspected of the crime originally but Sells later confessed to the double murder.
- October 13, 1997, Lawrenceville, Illinois: ten-year-old Joel Kirkpatrick was stabbed to death in his bedroom while he was sleeping at night. His mother, Julie Rea-Harper, ran to her son's bedroom, encountered an intruder wearing a ski mask, and then fought off the intruder before fleeing. The murder weapon, a steak knife from Rea's kitchen, had been left on the floor outside Joel's bedroom. She was convicted of Joel's murder, but was eventually exonerated.
- October 15, 1997, Springfield, Missouri: 13-year-old Stephanie Mahaney was found in 1997 in a farm pond west of Springfield. According to Sells, he pulled her from her bed in her home at night, drove her to a field, injected her with cocaine, raped her, and strangled her to death.
- December 14, 1997, Las Vegas, Nevada: 19-year-old Yvette Sophia Mueller was last seen in an RV park in Las Vegas. Sells claimed to have raped and killed a blonde-haired woman in Las Vegas, chopped her body up with an axe, and buried her next to the Snake River. The body was never found because it had been swept away by a landslide, but officials suspect Sells was referring to Mueller.
- April 15, 1998, San Antonio, Texas: Thomas Brose, 40, was a carnival worker who was shot to death in his motorhome. He was seen with a man matching Sells's description. Sells initially confessed to the crime but later recanted it.
- April 4, 1999, Gibson, Tennessee: Debra Harris, 31, and her eight-year-old daughter Ambria Halliburton were both killed after Sells broke into their house at night and raped Harris in her bed. She was stabbed repeatedly with her own kitchen knife which was left in her chest. Halliburton was stabbed three times after she witnessed Sells murder her mother.
- April 18, 1999, San Antonio, Texas: nine-year-old Mary Beatrice Perez was kidnapped from a market festival, driven to a stockyard, raped, and strangled to death with her T-shirt. Her body was found in a creek ten days later. Sells was convicted of the murder in 2003 and sentenced to life.
- May 23, 1999, Lexington, Kentucky: Haley McHone, 13, was raped and strangled by Sells. Her body was found ten days later. Sells was arrested in the area for public intoxication and released the next day.
- July 5, 1999, Kingfisher, Oklahoma: Bobbie Lynn Wofford, 14, was picked up from a Love's Convenience Store by Sells, who drove her to a secluded area, sexually assaulted her, struck her repeatedly with a hatchet, and finally shot her in the head with a large calibre revolver when she tried to escape. He dumped her body off the side of the road and kept two of her earrings.
- December 31, 1999, Del Rio, Texas: Kaylene Harris, 13, was sexually assaulted, stabbed sixteen times and her throat slashed by Sells after he broke into her trailer. Sells also attacked Krystal Surles, 10, who was at the same property, but she ultimately survived.

== Arrest and confessions ==
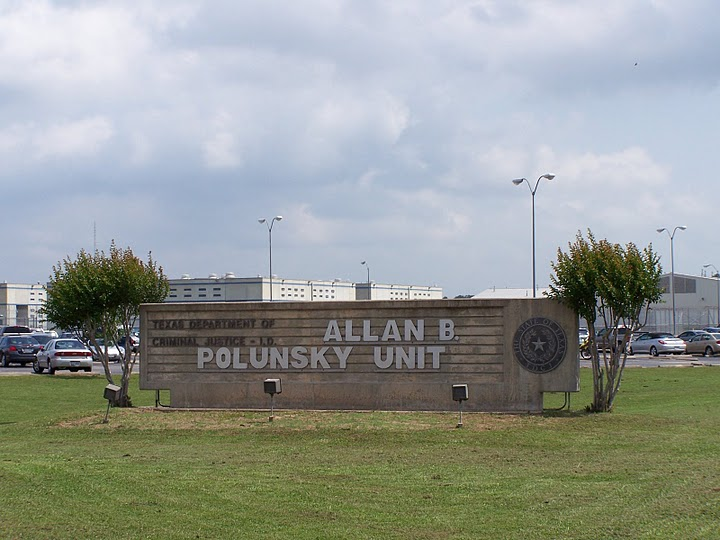
Allan B. Polunsky Unit, where Sells was located

On December 31, 1999, in the Guajia Bay subdivision west of Del Rio, Texas, Sells sexually assaulted, stabbed and killed 13-year-old Kaylene "Katy" Harris before slitting the throat of ten-year-old Krystal Surles. Krystal survived and received help from the neighbors after traveling one-quarter mile (0.4 km) to their home with a severed trachea. Sells was apprehended after being identified from a sketch made from the victim's description. Sells was housed on death row in the Allan B. Polunsky Unit near Livingston, Texas. The Texas Department of Criminal Justice received him on November 8, 2000.

In 2004, Sells confessed that on October 13, 1997, he broke into a home, took a knife from a butcher block in the kitchen, stabbed a little boy to death, and scuffled with a woman. Those details corroborated the account of Julie Rea Harper, who was initially convicted for the murder of her son, and then acquitted in 2006.

Over time, police came to suspect him of "working the system" by confessing to murders he had not committed. Sells confessed to a number of crimes and supposed murders which were never able to be corroborated. Sells said he and an accomplice kidnapped a woman in 1982 in Little Rock, Arkansas, who Sells raped, tortured, and killed, then dumped her body in a quarry. Law enforcement chose not to explore the deep quarry lake Sells led them to due to financial concerns. Sells also revealed that, in 1986, while he was working for Atlas Towing in St. Louis, he received a call from a prostitute whose car had broken down. When he arrived at the vehicle, he suggested sex in lieu of paying for the towing cost. When she declined, Sells said he shot her and threw her body in a river. Sells claimed that, in 1988, he met a woman and her son in Salt Lake City, Utah, and then travelled with them to go on a camping trip. Sells said he killed her and her son by an unclear method and dumped both of their bodies in the Snake River in Gooding County, Idaho. Sells told investigators that he had also killed a black man and dumped his body in a dumpster in Chicago. He named the specific street intersection where this allegedly occurred, but no such murder was ever discovered. Sells further claimed he killed a 20-year-old woman, whom he originally thought was a man, in a drug deal gone wrong in Truckee, California, on January 27, 1989. A report of an unrelated incident established that Sells was in the area and an unidentified female body was found in the area at that time. Additionally, Sells claimed to have killed two unidentified female hitchhikers in May 1989 in Roseburg, Oregon. Sells also referenced other additional victims whom he was said to have killed, and dumped in the Florida swamps, while he worked—along with several gay men—at various rest stops along the interstate in Pennsylvania.

The state's attorney in Jefferson County, Illinois, declined to charge Sells with the Dardeen family homicides in 1987 because his confession to the quadruple killing—while generally consistent with the facts of the case as reported in the media—was inaccurate with concern to some details that had not been made public. He also changed his account three times regarding how he had met the family. Investigators wanted to bring Sells to Illinois to resolve their doubts, but Texas refused, due to its law forbidding death-row prisoners from leaving the state.

== Execution ==
On January 3, 2014, a Del Rio judge set Sells's execution date for April 3, 2014.

Sells's death sentence was carried out at the Texas State Penitentiary in Huntsville. When asked if he would like to make a final statement, Sells replied, "No". As a lethal dose of pentobarbital was administered, he took a few deep breaths, closed his eyes, and began to snore. Less than a minute later, he stopped moving. Thirteen minutes later, at 6:27 p.m. (CDT), he was pronounced dead. Krystal Surles and members of both the Harris and Perez families attended the execution.

== In the media ==
Eight years before his execution, Sells was one of the featured interviewees on episode two ("Cold-Blooded Killers") of season one of the Investigation Discovery documentary series, Most Evil. The interview was done by forensic psychiatrist Dr. Michael Stone. In the interview, Sells claimed to have killed more than 70 people. Stone also analyzed Sells's case in his 2009 book The Anatomy of Evil, where Stone narrates how he suffered from nightmares following his interview with Sells during his visit to Texas State Penitentiary.

ABC News created a 10-minute mini-documentary Tommy Lynn Sells – The Mind of a Psychopath.

In 2021, A&E Networks original show I Survived A Serial Killer made an episode about the Fabienne Witherspoon story. The 48 Hours episode "Krystal's Courage", originally aired on September 4, 2010, recounts Sells's arrest and conviction, thanks in large part to the testimony of 10-year-old Krystal Surles, who survived his attack.

== See also ==
- List of serial killers by number of victims
- List of serial killers in the United States
- List of people executed in Texas, 2010–2019
- List of people executed in the United States in 2014

Executions carried out in Texas
Preceded by Anthony Dewayne Doyle; March 27, 2014	Tommy Lynn Sells; April 3, 2014	Succeeded by Ramiro Hernandez-Llanas; April 9, 2014
Executions carried out in the United States
Preceded by Anthony Dewayne Doyle – Texas; March 27, 2014	Tommy Lynn Sells – Texas; April 3, 2014	Succeeded by Ramiro Hernandez-Llanas – Texas; April 9, 2014
