= Clyde Lee (politician) =

American businessman and politician

Member of the Illinois House of Representatives

Personal details
- Party: Democratic

Clyde Lee (February 6, 1909 – January 22, 1999) was an American businessman and politician.

Lee was born in McClellan Township, Jefferson County, Illinois. He graduated from Mount Vernon Township High School, Mount Vernon, Illinois in 1928. He served in the United States Marine Corps during World War II from 1943 to 1945. Lee lived in Mount Vernon, Illinois with his wife and family. He worked as a bookkeeper for several businesses involving the automobile and furnace businesses in Mount Vernon. He was involved with the Democratic Party. He served as the city treasurer of Mount Vernon in 1933 and 1934 and as the county treasurer for Jefferson County from 1934 to 1938. Lee served in the Illinois House of Representatives from 1939 to 1941 and from 1947 until 1966. He also served in the Illinois Senate from 1941 to 1945. In 1966, Lee served as the secretary-treasurer of the Egyptian Trotting Association. He lived in Homewood, Illinois from 1966 to 1978. He then moved back to Mount Vernon, Illinois in 1978. He died at St. Mary's Hospital in Centralia, Illinois.
