= Cedarhurst Center for the Arts =

Art institution in Mount Vernon, Illinois

Mitchell Museum at Cedarhurst Center for the Arts
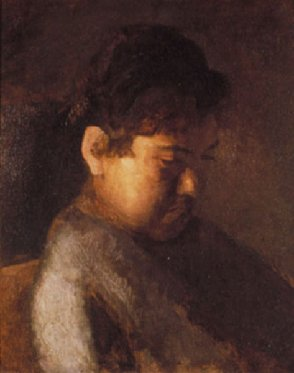
- Mitchell Museum at Cedarhurst; Margaret (1871), by Thomas Eakins.
- Established: 1973
- Location: 2600 Richview Road; Mount Vernon, Illinois; United States
- Coordinates: 38°19′42.01″N 88°55′15.77″W
- Website: www.cedarhurst.org

Cedarhurst Center for the Arts is a visual and performing arts institution in Mount Vernon, Illinois. Located on an 80-acre campus, it offers classes in art education, drawing and painting, ceramics and stained glass, knitting and quilting, and hosts concerts and community events. Among its facilities are the Mitchell Museum, the Kuenz Sculpture Park, the Shrode Art Center (art education), the Schweinfurth House, and the Performance Hall inside the Mitchell Museum. Cedarhurst Center for the Arts has achieved accreditation by the American Alliance of Museums (AAM), the highest national recognition afforded the nation’s museums. Accreditation signifies excellence to the museum community, to governments, funders, outside agencies, and to the museum-going public. The United States has an estimated 35,000 museums, and only a little over 1000 are currently accredited.

== Mitchell Museum ==
The Mitchell Museum - named for John R. and Eleanor R. Mitchell, who bequeathed their art collection to Cedarhurst in 1973 - contains a collection of American paintings including works by Mary Cassatt, Thomas Eakins, William Glackens, Robert Henri, George Luks, John Sloan, and other early-20th-century masters.

== History ==
A significant personal art collection was the reason John and Eleanor Mitchell planned a museum in rural southern Illinois. The museum was built to house the couple's collection of late 19th and early 20th century American paintings and artifacts. The collection included works from their friend and fellow collector John Parish, of Centralia, Illinois. The Mitchells acquired their artwork over four decades. In 1965, they established the Mitchell Foundation to build the Mitchell Museum at Cedarhurst and the Mitchell Museum opened in 1973. Both John and Eleanor died before the museum was completed.

== Today ==
In the past 40 years, Cedarhurst has grown into a cultural mecca spread over 80 acres. The original two-room museum has expanded into a 33,000-square-foot cultural center with four galleries (one of which exhibits works from the Mitchell collection), an interactive family learning center, and a performance hall. The campus is also home to the Shrode Art Center, which includes a gallery, classrooms, and studio space; the historic Mitchell Home and Schweinfurth House, used for special events and meetings; and the Goldman-Kuenz Sculpture Park which features contemporary sculpture.

== Bibliography ==
Kevin Sharp. Cedarhurst: The Museum & Its Collection. Mt. Vernon, IL: Cedarhurst Center for the Arts, 2008. ISBN 9780981578408
