= Summersville School District 79 =

School district in Jefferson County, Illinois, United States

Address
- 1118 Fairfield Road Mount Vernon, Illinois, 62864; United States

District information
- Type: Public
- Grades: PreK–8
- NCES District ID: 1738190

Students and staff
- Students: 282

Other information
- Website: www.summersville79.com

Summersville School District 79 or Summersville Grade School 79 (SGS) is a school district, consisting of a single K-8 school, in Mount Vernon, Illinois.

In 2013 the district was one of several to receive grants from the 2013 School District Library program.
