= Mt. Vernon Register-News =

American newspaper in Illinois (1884–2018)

- Type: Daily newspaper
- Format: Broadsheet
- Owner(s): Community Newspaper Holdings Inc.
- Publisher: Bob Dennis
- Editor: Tesa Glass
- Founded: 1884 (141 years ago)
- Ceased publication: 2018 (7 years ago)
- Headquarters: 911 Broadway, Mount Vernon, Illinois 62864 United States
- Circulation: 3,100 daily
- Website: register-news.com at the Wayback Machine (archive index)

The Mt. Vernon Register-News was a newspaper that served Mount Vernon, Illinois. The newspaper's marketing slogan was "We Are Mt. Vernon."

The Register-News traced its origin back to 1884, when the Mt. Vernon Daily Register was launched. The Mt. Vernon Daily News was founded in 1891, and the two papers merged in 1920 to create the Register-News, which published six days a week until cost-saving measures were employed in 2017 that reduced the newspaper to printing just three days a week: Tuesday, Thursday, and Saturday.

Former owner Thomson sold the paper to Hollinger in 1996. CNHI acquired the paper in 2000. The last edition of the Register-News was printed on February 6, 2018; the following day, CNHI announced the closure of both the Register-News (due to the “challenging market and economic conditions of Mount Vernon”) and the McLeansboro Times-Leader.
