= Opdyke, Illinois =

Town in Illinois, United States

- Census-designated place
- Location of Opdyke within Illinois
- Coordinates: 38°15′30″N 88°47′23″W
- Country: United States
- State: Illinois
- County: Jefferson
- Township: Pendleton

Area
  - Total: 0.53 sq mi (1.37 km^{2})
  - Land: 0.53 sq mi (1.37 km^{2})
  - Water: 0 sq mi (0.00 km^{2})
- Elevation: 515 ft (157 m)

Population (2020)
  - Total: 236
  - Density: 446.9/sq mi (172.54/km^{2})
- Time zone: UTC-6 (CST)
  - Summer (DST): UTC-5 (CDT)
- Zip code: 62872
- Area code: 618
- FIPS code: 17-56198
- GNIS ID: 2628558

Opdyke is a census-designated place in the southeastern part of Jefferson County, Illinois, United States. As of the 2020 census, its population was 236.

== History ==
Opdyke was laid out in 1871, following construction of the St. Louis & Southeastern Railroad. The nearby, earlier town of Lynchburg was largely abandoned and moved to Opdyke.

A part of the railroad investment in this area was funded by a mortgage of $4,525,000 by Calhoun & Opdyke of New York. The town is named for Opdyke. It is possible that the name of the village is all that they got out of the investment.

The original surveys of Illinois, made around 1800, show the Goshen Road passing through what is now the center of Opdyke in a north–south direction. The road was about a quarter mile east of the north–south section road that now forms the western boundary of the village. Few traces of this road now remain, and it is not clear if the road was still present at the time of the founding of the village.

Opdyke formed as a village alongside the railroad tracks. The railroad is no longer a significant factor in the existence of the village, which now fronts on Illinois Route 142. Interstate 64 passes a mile north of the village, without an interchange.

== Geography ==
According to the 2021 census gazetteer files, Opdyke has a total area of 0.53 square miles (1.37 km^{2}), all land.

== Demographics ==
Historical population
Census	Pop.	Note	%±
2010	254		—
2020	236		−7.1%
U.S. Decennial Census

As of the 2020 census there were 236 people, 126 households, and 86 families residing in the CDP. The population density was 446.97 inhabitants per square mile (172.58/km^{2}). There were 101 housing units at an average density of 191.29 per square mile (73.86/km^{2}). The racial makeup of the CDP was 93.22% White, 1.27% African American, 0.00% Native American, 0.00% Asian, 0.00% Pacific Islander, 0.00% from other races, and 5.51% from two or more races. Hispanic or Latino of any race were 0.85% of the population.

There were 126 households, out of which 31.7% had children under the age of 18 living with them, 50.00% were married couples living together, none had a female householder with no husband present, and 31.75% were non-families. 31.75% of all households were made up of individuals, and 17.46% had someone living alone who was 65 years of age or older. The average household size was 2.95 and the average family size was 2.40.

The CDP's age distribution consisted of 28.1% under the age of 18, 6.9% from 18 to 24, 22.8% from 25 to 44, 28.7% from 45 to 64, and 13.5% who were 65 years of age or older. The median age was 40.0 years. For every 100 females, there were 89.4 males. For every 100 females age 18 and over, there were 109.6 males.

The median income for a household in the CDP was $63,750, and the median income for a family was $72,500. Males had a median income of $42,019 versus $21,250 for females. The per capita income for the CDP was $24,612. About 3.5% of families and 13.9% of the population were below the poverty line, including 23.5% of those under age 18 and none of those age 65 or over.
