= Rend Lake College =

Community college in Ina, Illinois, U.S.

Coordinates: 38°7′50.95″N 88°55′8.29″W

- Former name: Mt. Vernon Community College (1955-1966)
- Motto: "Your Journey Starts Here"
- Type: Public community college
- Established: 1955
- Parent institution: Illinois Community College System
- Endowment: $4,927,997
- President: Terry Wilkerson
- Students: 2,017 (Fall 2022)
- Location: Ina, Illinois, U.S.
- Campus: Rural, 350 acres (140 ha)
- Newspaper: RLC Times
- Colours: Red, white, black
- Nickname: Warriors
- Sporting affiliations: NJCAA; Great Rivers Athletic Conference
- Website: www.rlc.edu

Rend Lake College (RLC) is a public community college in Ina, Illinois. It is part of the Illinois Community College System (ICCS).

== History ==
Rend Lake College was founded in 1955 as Mt. Vernon Community College to allow students from High School District No. 201 the opportunity to receive post-secondary education similar to university curriculum. Authorized by the Illinois General Assembly and signed by Illinois Governor Otto Kerner, Jr. in 1961, the legislation enacted created the Illinois Board of Higher Education (IBHE). The IBHE was tasked by statute with formulating a Master Plan for Higher Education in the state of Illinois. In July 1964 the higher education master plan was published by the IBHE, which led to the Junior College Act of 1965. Soon thereafter, the institution was officially renamed Rend Lake College when it was organized December 20, 1966.

The Mt. Vernon Township High School and its faculty served as the initial facilities for the college when it began in 1967. The college began with a staff of 29 full-time and eight part-time faculty members, two full-time administrators and a librarian. Soon after its organization, the RLC Board of Trustees selected a 350-acre (1.4 km^{2}) site near Ina, Illinois, located between Interstate 57 and Rend Lake, and began planning a new campus. Voters approved a bond issue of $3.1 million in 1967, to provide for the districts local share of the $9.5 million total cost. Groundbreaking ceremonies for construction were held March 27, 1969, coinciding with the day the college received word of its first North Central Association of Colleges and Schools accreditation.

In 2002, off-campus changes occurred with the addition of the Rend Lake College MarketPlace in Mt. Vernon and the Rend Lake College Murphy-Wall Pinckneyville Campus. In Fall 2005, the Applied Science Center opened on the southwest corner of campus. This 22,300 square feet (2,070 m^{2}) facility houses the Agricultural Business, Agricultural Production, Agricultural Mechanics, Heavy Equipment and Diesel Technology programs. On August 7, 2008, RLC broke ground on the new Coal Mining Training Center, a 20,000 square feet (1,900 m^{2}) training facility located next to the Mark Kern Applied Science Center. The college received $1.07 million in grant funding from Illinois Department of Commerce and Economic Opportunity for the construction of the facility, alongside a $1.6 million grant from the U.S. Department of Labor to train students in the mining industry. One year later on August 11, 2009, the new facility held its first open house to the public.

== Campus ==
Rend Lake College currently has its main campus in Ina, Illinois. A second learning center for classes, known as the RLC Murphy-Wall Pinckneyville Campus was opened in Pinckneyville, Illinois. In addition to RLC's two credit learning campuses, the college holds non-credit classes at its RLC Marketplace location. Located in Mt. Vernon, Illinois, the RLC Marketplace houses shops and businesses as a part of RLC curriculum.

In addition to the degrees it offers at its two campuses, Rend Lake College currently operates two satellite campuses at local correctional facilities under contract with the Illinois Department of Corrections. RLC holds vocational and rehabilitative classes at IDOC facilities, which are closed to the public.

== Academics and demographics ==
Rend Lake College is accredited by the Higher Learning Commission.

Rend Lake College partners with area four-year colleges and universities, such as Southern Illinois University, Carbondale, Southern Illinois University, Edwardsville, and the Western Illinois University as a part of the Illinois Articulation Initiative (IAI), a statewide transfer agreement which ensures general education credits are transferable among more than 100 participating college or universities in Illinois. In addition to the IAI, RLC offers students "two-plus-two" programs that guarantee students that the courses completed at the college will transfer to their majors at four-year baccalaureate institutions. There are seven primary divisions at Rend Lake College: Advanced Technology, Math/Science/Education, Allied Health, Health & P.E., Applied Science, Skills Center, Liberal Arts, and Special Programs. The divisions offer a total of 43 associate degree programs, and 80 certificate programs.

== Enrollment ==
The student body was about 42% male, 58% female (960-1335). 91.3% of the student population was Caucasian, 6.4% African-American, 1.0% Hispanic, 0.8% Asian, and 0.4% all other races.

=== Libraries ===
Rend Lake College provides a library within its Learning Resources Center at its main Ina, Illinois Campus. The library has 21,000 volumes, and 145 periodical and newspaper titles alongside online resources and a media learning area. It has facilities for study, research, leisure reading, class preparation, and wireless Internet access for students.

== Endowment ==
The Rend Lake College Foundation, an Illinois registered not-for-profit organization, is a separate but cooperative entity alongside Rend Lake College. The goal of the foundation is to support Rend Lake College activities through fundraising and endowment management. Through a combination of fundraising events, investment, and donations, the foundation's endowment grew from $1.3 million in 1997, to $4.9 million in 2007.

In 2007, the Foundation began its "Friends of the Theater" campaign. the campaign set out to raise $50,000, one-quarter of the $200,000 needed to make a theatre renovation requested by the school. The campaign raised $72,700 by mid-March 2008. The $282,000 renovation was completed to the theater by the end of March 2009. The renovations included wider seats, wall-to-wall carpeting, acoustic wall treatments and handicapped-accessible seating. The foundation also assists the school by providing scholarships for students. A recent scholarship drive between local business and the foundation raised $44,000 for local area high school students.

== Student life ==
=== Academic clubs ===
RLC has an active student population, with over 25 registered student clubs involved in academic, competitive, and cultural-based activities. The RLC College Bowl, an academic club, competes with other schools in the Southern Illinois Collegiate Common Market (SICCM) conference. Having won the state championships several years in a row, the College Bowl team recently went to the Illinois state academic finals after being undefeated for the entire 2008–2009 season. In addition, the campus has an active chapter of Phi Theta Kappa (ΦΘΚ) the international honor society for two-year colleges and academic programs.

=== Student athletics ===
Rend Lake College fields teams known as the Warriors which compete in the National Junior College Athletic Association (NJCAA) in the following sports:

Men's Intercollegiate Sports

- Baseball
- Basketball
- Golf

Women's Intercollegiate Sports

- Basketball
- Golf
- Softball
- Tennis
- Volleyball

The Warriors were one of the dominant programs of the early 21st Century in men's cross country, winning the NJCAA Division II championship in 2001-03 and the Division I title in 2006 & 2009, and hosted the 2007 and 2012 NJCAA Division I Championships. Rend Lake was also the 2008 NJCAA Indoor Track and Field National Champion Rend Lake recorded 5 national champions in men's cross-country: Ian Hornabrook (2001 and 2002), Ben Cheruiyot (2007), and Stephen Sambu (2008 and 2009) and a number of other individual champions in track, along with numerous All-Americans in both cross-country and track. However, both the track and cross-country programs were suspended effective March 10, 2015 due to high travel costs and the inability to find nearby competitors.

In other sports, the Warriors won the NJCAA Division II title in men's basketball in 2013 and qualified for the national championships in women's golf 11 times between 2000 and 2012, with a best finish of fourth place in 2005.

Rend Lake formerly had a wrestling program, but that was suspended on May 7, 2013, due to a lack of funding from the state, high costs of running the program, and the inability to find nearby community colleges that also offered wrestling.

=== Cultural activities ===
The Rend Lake College Cultural Events Committee is a campus organization dedicated to bringing artists in multiple disciplines to both the college and the surrounding area. The main campus also houses an active Theater, which hosts numerous student-organized productions throughout the year. An extension of the theater department is the Thespians, a student-led improvisational troop that performs at local area cultural events. RLC also has an inter-college organization known as the Student Ambassadors, who serve as hosts or hostesses, tour guides and recruitment role models to area high school students.

=== Ag Club ===
The Agriculture Department at Rend Lake College offers an Ag Club which is able to be joined by anyone in the agriculture department. Annual dues are ten dollars.

== Transportation ==
The main campus of Rend Lake College in Ina is served by South Central Transit. The Olive Route provides bus service from campus north to Mt. Vernon and south to Marion.
