= José Vilchis =

Mexican gymnast (born 1950)

- Rojas's Mugshot

Personal information
- Full name: José Félix Vilchis Rojas
- Born: 30 September 1950 (age 75) Mexico City, Mexico
- Height: 1.61 m (5 ft 3 in)

Gymnastics career
- Discipline: Men's artistic gymnastics
- Country represented: Mexico
- Criminal information
- Imprisoned at: Big Muddy River Correctional Center

José Félix Vilchis Rojas (born 30 September 1950) is a Mexican gymnast. He competed in eight events at the 1968 Summer Olympics.

On 21 February 2023, Vilchis was sentenced to 96 years in prison in Illinois, after being convicted of eight counts of criminal sexual assault.
