= George Corbett (American football) =

American football player (1908–1990)

- Corbett in 1936

No. 5
- Positions: Halfback, quarterback

Personal information
- Born: June 14, 1908; Dix, Illinois, U.S.
- Died: October 11, 1990 (aged 82); Decatur, Illinois, U.S.

Career information
- College: Millikin

Career history
- Chicago Bears (1932–1938); Newark Bears (1939)

Awards and highlights
- 2× NFL champion (1932, 1933)

Career statistics
- Games played: 46
- Starts: 9
- Rushing yards: 425 (3.1 average)
- Receiving yards: 250 (17.9 average)
- Touchdowns: 3
- Stats at Pro Football Reference

George Burdette Corbett (June 14, 1908 – October 11, 1990) was an American professional football player who played at the halfback and quarterback positions for the Chicago Bears from 1932 to 1938. He played college football at Millikin University.

== Early life ==
Corbett was born in 1908 in Dix, Illinois. He graduated from Arthur High School in Arthur, Illinois. He enrolled at Millikin University in Decatur, Illinois, where he won 10 varsity letters in football, basketball, and baseball. During his four years with the Millikin football team, Corbett played halfback, scored 202 points, and led the team to a 24-4-2 record. He was captain of the 1931 team.

== Professional football ==
Corbett played professional football in the National Football League (NFL) for the Chicago Bears from 1932 to 1938, including the Bears' championship seasons of 1932 and 1933. In seven NFL seasons, he appeared in 47 NFL games, rushed for 425 yards, passed for 233 yards, tallied 14 receptions for 250 yards, scored three touchdowns, and kicked an extra point and a field goal. Corbett announced his retirement from football at the end of the 1938 season. He was a sports duo with another player also named George. Their nickname was "The Two Georges."

Corbett also played quarterback for the Newark Bears in 1939.

== Later life ==
Corbett died in 1990 at Decatur Memorial Hospital in Decatur, Illinois.
