= Casey Creek, Kentucky =

Unincorporated community in Kentucky, United States

Casey Creek
- Unincorporated community
- Location within the state of Kentucky Casey Creek (the United States)
- Coordinates: 37°16′20″N 85°9′27″W
- Country: United States
- State: Kentucky
- County: Adair
- Elevation: 738 ft (225 m)
- Time zone: UTC-6 (Central (CST))
  - Summer (DST): UTC-5 (CDT)
- GNIS feature ID: 507665

Casey Creek is an unincorporated community in Adair County, Kentucky, United States. Its elevation is 738 feet (225 m).
