= Reed Green (politician) =

American lawyer and politician (1865–1937)

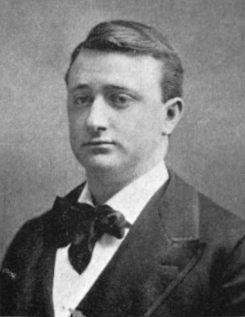

Member of the Illinois Senate
- In office 1893–1897

Member of the Illinois House of Representatives
- In office 1889–1893

Personal details
- Born: September 22, 1865 Mount Vernon, Illinois, US
- Died: January 2, 1937 (aged 71) Cairo, Illinois, US
- Party: Democratic
- Education: Southern Illinois University
- Occupation: Lawyer

Reed Green (September 22, 1865 – January 2, 1937) was a lawyer and politician.

== Biography ==
Reed was born in Mount Vernon, Illinois. He went to Southern Illinois University and to the Wesleyan Law School in Bloomington, Illinois. He taught school in Cairo, Illinois. He was admitted to the Illinois bar and practiced law in Cairo, Illinois. Green served in the Illinois House of Representatives from 1889 to 1893 and in the Illinois Senate from 1893 to 1897. He was a Democrat. Green died from a heart attack in Cairo, Illinois.
