= Kell, Illinois =

- Village
- Location in Marion County, Illinois
- Coordinates: 38°29′28″N 88°54′12″W
- Country: United States
- State: Illinois
- County: Marion
- Township: Haines

Area
  - Total: 1.00 sq mi (2.60 km^{2})
  - Land: 1.00 sq mi (2.60 km^{2})
  - Water: 0 sq mi (0.00 km^{2})
- Elevation: 614 ft (187 m)

Population (2020)
  - Total: 173
  - Density: 172.6/sq mi (66.66/km^{2})
- Time zone: UTC-6 (CST)
  - Summer (DST): UTC-5 (CDT)
- ZIP code: 62853
- Area code: 618
- FIPS code: 17-39324
- GNIS ID: 2398333

Kell is a village in Marion County, Illinois, United States. The population was 173 at the 2020 census, down from 219 in 2010.

== Geography ==
Kell is located in southern Marion County south-southeast of Salem, the county seat, and 5 miles (8 km) northeast of Dix.

According to the U.S. Census Bureau, Kell has a total area of 1.004 square miles (2.60 km^{2}), of which 0.002 square miles (0.01 km^{2}), or 0.20%, are water.

Casey Creek has its headwaters in the north-central part of the village and flows southward through the village center. It is a tributary of the Big Muddy River, which runs south to the Mississippi River north of Cape Girardeau, Missouri. The northwest part of the village drains to Raccoon Creek, a west-flowing tributary of Crooked Creek and part of the Kaskaskia River watershed flowing to the Mississippi near Ste. Genevieve, Missouri. The divide between the Casey Creek/Big Muddy Basin and the Kaskaskia Basin is about 1,000 feet (300 m) west of town, over a rise that is barely noticeable. The eastern part of the village drains to Horse Creek, a southeast-flowing tributary of the Skillet Fork of the Little Wabash River, part of the Ohio River watershed, which flows to the Mississippi River at Cairo, Illinois. The divide between the Ohio River watershed and the other tributaries of the Mississippi is within the village limits just east of the village center. The village water tower sits atop this prominent ridge.

== Demographics ==
Historical population
Census	Pop.	Note	%±
1930	187		—
1940	216		15.5%
1950	193		−10.6%
1960	194		0.5%
1970	173		−10.8%
1980	283		63.6%
1990	213		−24.7%
2000	231		8.5%
2010	219		−5.2%
2020	173		−21.0%
U.S. Decennial Census

As of the census of 2000, there were 231 people, 84 households, and 68 families residing in the village. The population density was 228.7 inhabitants per square mile (88.3/km^{2}). There were 89 housing units at an average density of 88.1 per square mile (34.0/km^{2}). The racial makeup of the village was 100.00% White.

There were 84 households, out of which 35.7% had children under the age of 18 living with them, 73.8% were married couples living together, 7.1% had a female householder with no husband present, and 17.9% were non-families. 15.5% of all households were made up of individuals, and 11.9% had someone living alone who was 65 years of age or older. The average household size was 2.75 and the average family size was 3.09.

In the village, the population was spread out, with 27.3% under the age of 18, 6.5% from 18 to 24, 28.1% from 25 to 44, 25.1% from 45 to 64, and 13.0% who were 65 years of age or older. The median age was 40 years. For every 100 females, there were 97.4 males. For every 100 females age 18 and over, there were 100.0 males.

The median income for a household in the village was $40,909, and the median income for a family was $41,719. Males had a median income of $31,806 versus $21,250 for females. The per capita income for the village was $17,002. None of the population or families were below the poverty line.
