= Casey Creek (Illinois) =

Stream in Illinois, United States

Casey Fork
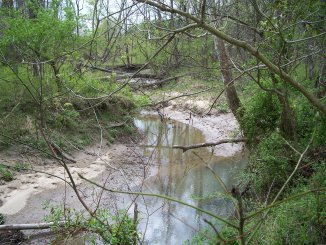
- Headwaters of Casey Fork Creek in Southern Illinois

Physical characteristics
- Source
  - location: Haines Township, Marion County, Illinois
  - coordinates: 38°29′12″N 88°54′50″W
- Mouth
  - location: Confluence with Big Muddy River in Rend Lake
  - coordinates: 38°05′27″N 88°57′24″W
- Length: 39 mi (63 km)

Casey Creek is a major tributary of the Big Muddy River in Illinois, United States. It is about 39.0 miles (62.8 km) long, measured from the junction of its arm of Rend Lake with the arm formed by the Big Muddy River.

Casey Creek is shown on federal maps as Casey Fork, following a 1967 decision by the U.S. Board on Geographic Names. It is named for Zadok Casey, a congressman from Illinois in the early 19th century.

== Course ==
Casey Creek rises in Marion County, between Iuka and Kell. It flows southward through the center of Kell as a small creek.

Like most of the rest of the Big Muddy basin, Casey Creek flows through an ancient lake bed from the Wisconsin glaciation. This gives it a broad, flat floodplain that is filled with shallow water in wet weather. Heading south, the lake bed becomes recognizable about 10 miles (16 km) north of Mt. Vernon, as flat ground that meets the older hills at an abrupt angle. In the north, the flat valley bottom is only a few hundred feet wide, but it widens toward the south.

The Union Pacific Railroad follows Casey Creek from Kell down to Mt. Vernon. This railroad was originally built as the C&EI around 1909. The railroad crosses the creek several times during its descent to Mt. Vernon. This route includes several cuts into the hills adjacent to the creek, resulting in bluffs.

The Norfolk Southern (formerly the Southern Railway) railroad enters the Casey Creek valley, via Limestone Creek, to the north of Mt. Vernon. The two railroads enter the northeastern corner of Mt. Vernon on opposite sides of the creek. At full flood, Casey Creek rages between the two railroad embankments, which are about 3,000 feet (910 m) apart.

There is a large bluff next to the Norfolk Southern tracks at the northeast corner of Mt. Vernon. Casey Creek has eroded into bedrock at the base of the bluff, exposing shale. This is the top of the Pennsylvanian, coal-bearing cyclothems under Mt. Vernon.

The Mt. Vernon sewage treatment plant discharges to Casey Creek to the southeast of the city. At low flows, this accounts for most of the flow in the creek.

South of Mt. Vernon, in its natural state, Casey Creek entered the Bakerville Bottoms. This was a classic swamp consisting of hardwood trees that were subjected to seasonal flooding. Today this is a part of the swamp created by the headwaters of Rend Lake.

The Big Muddy and Casey Creek have been dammed near their confluence in Franklin County, forming Rend Lake. The eastern arm of the lake is the former Casey Creek bottomland. The Casey Creek Subimpoundment Dam is located upstream of Rend Lake, forming a swamp that protects the lake to some degree from siltation.

== Cities, towns and counties ==
The following cities and towns are drained by Casey Creek:

- Bonnie
- Dix (partially, including the sewage treatment outfall)
- Ina
- Kell
- Mt. Vernon
- Texico

Portions of the following counties are drained by Casey Creek:

- Franklin County
- Jefferson County
- Marion County, Illinois

== Lakes and tributaries ==
The following artificial lakes are located in the Casey Creek watershed:

- Jaycee Lake (formerly known as Heil Lake)
- Miller Lake
- Rend Lake

The major tributaries of Casey Creek include Limestone Creek, Seven Mile Creek, Dodds Creek and Atchison Creek. Gun Creek, which enters Rend Lake on the east side, might also be considered a Casey Creek tributary.

== See also ==
- List of Illinois rivers
