= Dix, Illinois =

- Village
- Location of Dix in Jefferson County, Illinois
- Coordinates: 38°26′35″N 88°56′32″W
- Country: United States
- State: Illinois
- County: Jefferson
- Township: Rome

Area
  - Total: 2.08 sq mi (5.40 km^{2})
  - Land: 2.07 sq mi (5.37 km^{2})
  - Water: 0.012 sq mi (0.03 km^{2})
- Elevation: 587 ft (179 m)

Population (2020)
  - Total: 469
  - Density: 226.2/sq mi (87.32/km^{2})
- Time zone: UTC-6 (CST)
  - Summer (DST): UTC-5 (CDT)
- ZIP code: 62830
- Area code: 618
- FIPS code: 17-20123
- GNIS ID: 2398729
- Website: villageofdixillinois.com

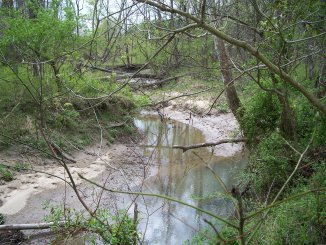
Casey Creek on its way to the Big Muddy River

Dix is a village in Jefferson County, Illinois, United States. The population was 469 at the 2020 census. It is part of the Mount Vernon Micropolitan Statistical Area.

== History ==
Among the first settlers around Dix were two brothers named Andrews (Arba and Nelson?), who came from Rome, New York, around 1830. One of them established a post office called "Jordan's Prairie", the name already given to the grassland to the south. Later he platted out a village, which he called "Rome", after his home town in New York. The post office was moved into the village in 1852, and the name changed.

Hiram Milburn of Kell, Illinois, moved to Rome between 1853 and 1855. Milburn built a storehouse in 1853 and a hotel in 1854. It is said that during the construction of the hotel, a wind blew the structure down into a pile, while two men were on the joists, but nobody was hurt. In 1855 Milburn purchased Leuty's Mill and moved it to Rome.

Although Rome Township still exists, the name of the post office was changed to "Dix" in 1865. There was and still is another Rome, Illinois, and the Postal Service insisted that the name of this village be changed. The community incorporated as the village of Rome in 1873. The name of the village was not legally changed to Dix until the 1960s.

There are several stories as to the origin of the name "Dix". One is that the town was renamed in honor of General John Adams Dix. At the outbreak of the Civil War, General Dix sent a telegram to his agents in New Orleans stating: "If any man pulls down the American flag, shoot him on the spot." Although the telegram was intercepted by Confederate agents and never reached its intended recipient, the text reached the press, and General Dix became one of the first heroes in the North.

Dix is served by the Norfolk Southern Railway. This was built around 1890. The rail line comes from the St. Louis area and turns southeast at Dix. It follows the west side of Casey Creek down to Mt. Vernon.

== June 21, 2026 Dix Tornado (Fathers Day Outbreak) ==
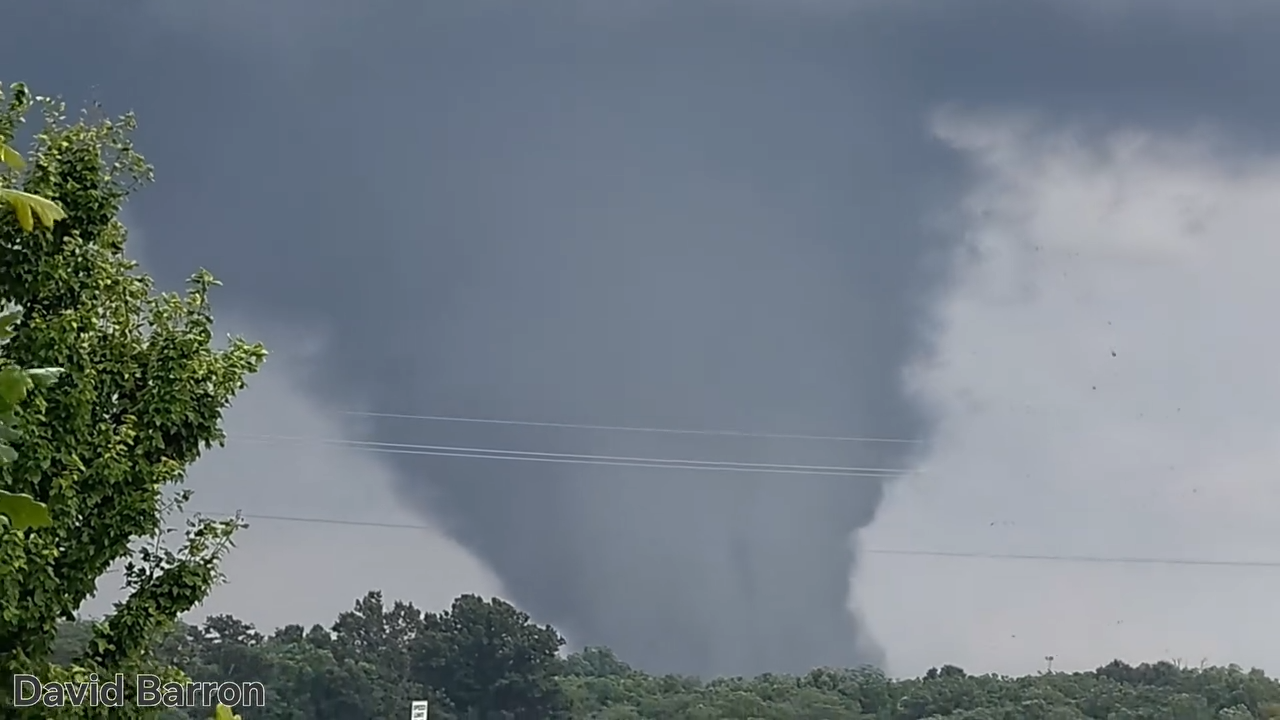
The Tornado as it crossed near Dix.

On June 21, 2026, at 5:02 PM CDT, a spotter confirmed tornado touched down northwest of Mount Vernon, and southwest of Dix. The tornado moved at 28 miles per hour eastward. The National Weather Service would issue a PDS (Particularly Dangerous Situation) Tornado Warning for northern Jefferson county, including Salem, Kell, Iuka, and Idlewood.

== Geography ==
Dix is located in northern Jefferson County. Illinois Route 37 is the village's Main Street, leading south 9 miles (14 km) to Mount Vernon, the county seat, and north 13 miles (21 km) to Salem. Interstate 57 passes through the western side of the village, with access from Exit 103. I-57 leads south 7 miles (11 km) to Interstate 64 at Mount Vernon and north 55 miles (89 km) to Interstate 70 at Effingham.

According to the 2021 census gazetteer files, Dix has a total area of 2.08 square miles (5.39 km^{2}), of which 2.07 square miles (5.36 km^{2}) (or 99.52%) is land and 0.01 square miles (0.03 km^{2}) (or 0.48%) is water. Dix is located on high ground that marks the boundary between the Big Muddy River and its tributary, Casey Creek.

Today Dix is an exit on Interstate 57, a major north–south roadway. When it was founded, however, it was on the Goshen Road, which was the main east–west road in Illinois, running from Old Shawneetown on the Ohio River to near East St. Louis on the Mississippi.

== Demographics ==
Historical population
Census	Pop.	Note	%±
1880	153		—
1890	186		21.6%
1900	229		23.1%
1910	233		1.7%
1920	216		−7.3%
1930	189		−12.5%
1940	246		30.2%
1950	190		−22.8%
1960	181		−4.7%
1970	167		−7.7%
1980	319		91.0%
1990	456		42.9%
2000	494		8.3%
2010	461		−6.7%
2020	469		1.7%
U.S. Decennial Census

As of the 2020 census there were 469 people, 254 households, and 114 families residing in the village. The population density was 225.05 inhabitants per square mile (86.89/km^{2}). There were 258 housing units at an average density of 123.80 per square mile (47.80/km^{2}). The racial makeup of the village was 90.62% White, 0.85% African American, 0.21% Native American, 1.92% Asian, 0.00% Pacific Islander, 0.00% from other races, and 6.40% from two or more races. Hispanic or Latino of any race were 2.56% of the population.

There were 254 households, out of which 24.8% had children under the age of 18 living with them, 20.87% were married couples living together, 13.78% had a female householder with no husband present, and 55.12% were non-families. 51.57% of all households were made up of individuals, and 16.14% had someone living alone who was 65 years of age or older. The average household size was 3.17 and the average family size was 2.10.

The village's age distribution consisted of 20.6% under the age of 18, 10.7% from 18 to 24, 22.8% from 25 to 44, 26.4% from 45 to 64, and 19.5% who were 65 years of age or older. The median age was 42.2 years. For every 100 females, there were 110.2 males. For every 100 females age 18 and over, there were 139.5 males.

The median income for a household in the village was $30,000, and the median income for a family was $75,000. Males had a median income of $40,250 versus $36,250 for females. The per capita income for the village was $22,881. About 5.3% of families and 21.7% of the population were below the poverty line, including 17.9% of those under age 18 and 25.0% of those age 65 or over.

== Notable people ==
- George Corbett, running back for Chicago Bears 1932–38
- Chuck Riley, Oregon State Senator, Senate District 15
- Keith Stroup, activist, founder of NORML
