= Mount Vernon City Schools (Illinois) =

School district in Mount Vernon, Illinois, USA

Mount Vernon City Schools, District 80 is a school district headquartered in Mount Vernon, Illinois.

== Schools ==
- Dr. Andy Hall Early Childhood Center (preschool)
- Dr. Nick Osborne Primary Center (K-3)
- J.L. Buford Intermediate Education Center (grades 4 and 5)
- Zadok Casey Middle School (grades 6–8)
