= Goshen Settlement =

The Goshen Settlement was an early American pioneer settlement in what is now Illinois, United States, located to the east of St. Louis, Missouri. The settlement was located about one mile (1.6 km) southwest of modern Glen Carbon, Illinois, at the point where Judy's Creek emerges from the bluffs into the American Bottoms, on its way to the Mississippi River.

In 1799, David Bagley, a Virginia Baptist minister passed through the area and determined that it was a land of such expanse and luxuriant vegetation that he compared it to the Biblical Land of Goshen. References to this Land of Goshen have persisted since that time.

In 1801, Col. Samuel Judy received a military grant of 100 acres (0.40 km^{2}) near the base of the bluffs, just north of Judy's Creek, and became the first permanent American settler of Madison County. The area became known as the Goshen Settlement, and, while its boundaries were never clearly outlined, it was centered on the Judy property at the junction of Judy's Creek and present day Illinois Route 157.

In 1808, the Goshen Road was built as a wagon road across Illinois, from the Goshen Settlement to the salt works near Shawneetown. The trail crossed the state diagonally following a route from Peter's Station to the north and west of Glen Carbon, east to Troy, and then in a southeasterly direction, eventually ending at Shawneetown on the Ohio River. The existing Goshen Road running from Route 159 to the intersection of Route 143, south of Edwardsville, is part of the original road.

Today the Goshen Settlement is mostly remembered by a line of short road segments named "Goshen Road", across Illinois, and many places named "Goshen" that were once adjacent to this long lost road to a long lost place. These names are all the more confusing because the modern towns of Goshen, Illinois and Goshen, Indiana are nowhere close to the old settlement.
