= Big Muddy River =

River in Southern Illinois

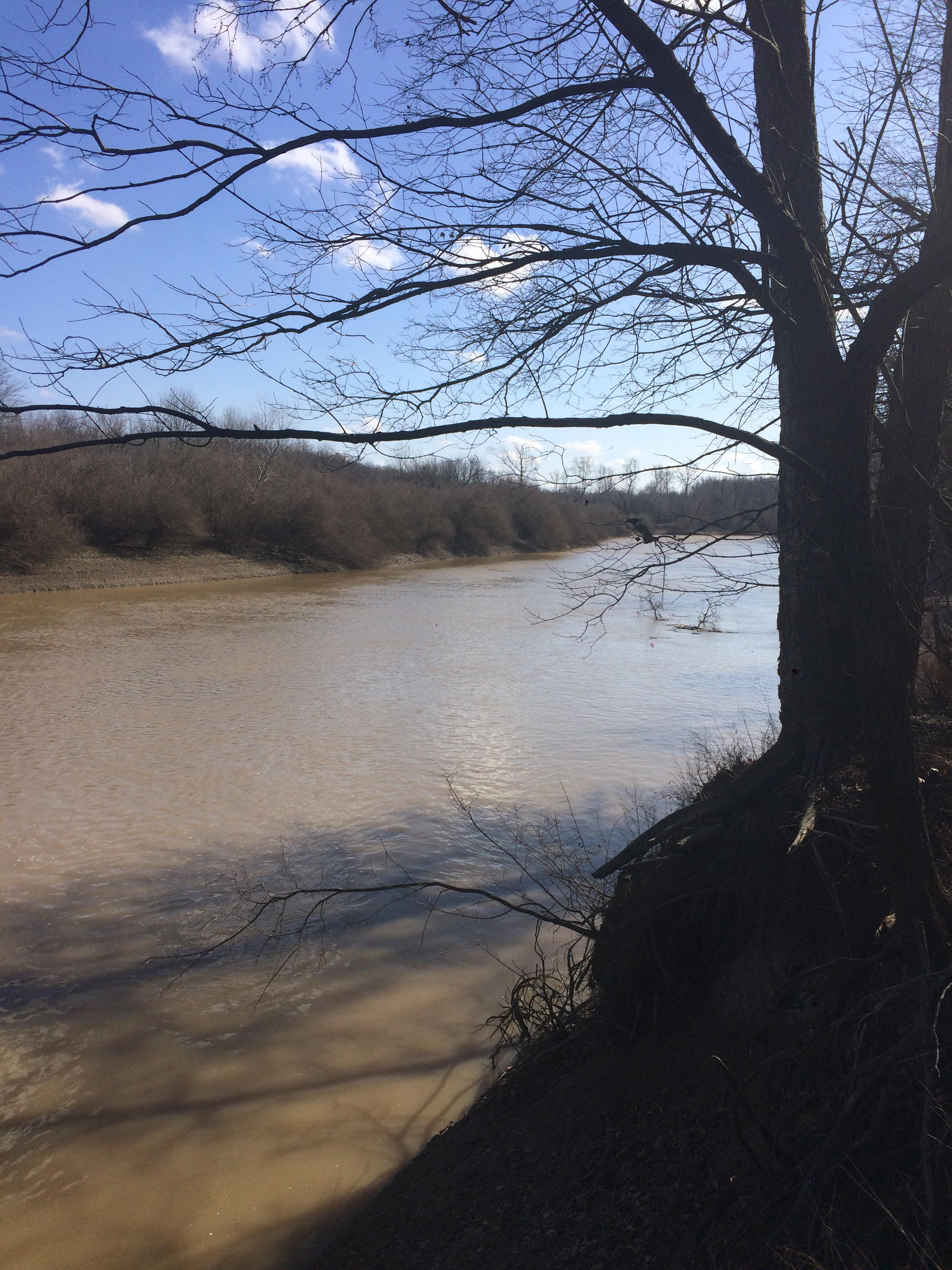
- The Big Muddy River, south of Murphysboro, at a boat launch across from the Little Grand Canyon

Physical characteristics
- Source
  - location: Jefferson County southeast of Centralia, Illinois
  - coordinates: 38°28′27″N 89°05′25″W
- Mouth
  - location: Confluence with the Mississippi River southwest of Murphysboro, Illinois
  - coordinates: 37°34′25″N 89°31′01″W
  - elevation: 341 ft (104 m)
- Length: 156 mi (251 km)
- Discharge
  - location: Murphysboro, Illinois
  - average: 2,164 cu/ft. per sec.

Basin features
- Progression: Big Muddy River → Mississippi → Gulf of Mexico
- GNIS ID: 404425

The Big Muddy River is a 156-mile-long (251 km) river in southern Illinois. It joins the Mississippi River just south of Grand Tower. The Big Muddy has been dammed near Benton, forming Rend Lake.

The Big Muddy has a mud bottom for most of its length.

== Hydrography ==
The Big Muddy drains a 2,344-square-mile (6,070 km^{2}) watershed. In 1995, water quality was assessed as "fair" to "good". Pollution sources include agricultural practices, mining and municipalities.

The watershed of the Big Muddy was covered by the Illinoian Glacier about 300,000 to 132,000 years before present. The Big Muddy basin formed after the retreat of that glacier.

The Big Muddy was not covered by the Wisconsin Glacier, about 70,000 to 10,000 years before present. However, during the melting of that glacier, the level of the Mississippi River was much higher. Water backed up into the Big Muddy Basin, forming a lake much like the artificial Rend Lake but covering a larger area. The ancient lake silted in, forming a flat bottom. After the melting of the Wisconsinan glacier, the level of the Mississippi dropped, allowing the lake to drain. A new channel formed within the old lake bed. This channel meandered in the flat bottom of the Wisconsinan-era lake. This is why the Big Muddy tends to be so muddy.

The Big Muddy joins the Mississippi River in Jackson County near the La Rue-Pine Hills Ecological Area and less than 1 mile (1.6 km) south of Grand Tower Island. The Pine Hills are bluffs overlooking the Big Muddy as it flows through La Rue swamp. During the melting of the Wisconsinan glacier, the Mississippi River flood plain was filled with rushing meltwater in summer. During the winter the flow of meltwater was cut off, and the floodplain was a wide stretch of exposed mud. Winter winds created dust storms that covered Southern Illinois with "loess", fine grained, wind born deposits. At the edge of the floodplain, dunes, called "loess hills", formed. The Pine Hills are loess hills standing several hundred feet above the floodplain.

Prior to the construction of Rend Lake, much of the ancient lake bed was swamp: a forested area that was covered by water through most of the winter, and during wet summers. When the Big Muddy flooded, the water covered the flat bottom of the ancient lake bed for miles either direction from the meandering channel.

The upper reaches of the Big Muddy are near Dix, Illinois. Here the outline of the Wisconsinan Era lake bed is evident in what were the northern reaches of the ancient lake, where the lake bed was only a few hundred feet wide. The steep Illinoian hills are suddenly truncated where they meet the flat bottom of the Wisconsinan Era lake bed. Here the tributaries of the Big Muddy are tiny, intermittent streams, meandering though these narrow valleys at the headwaters.

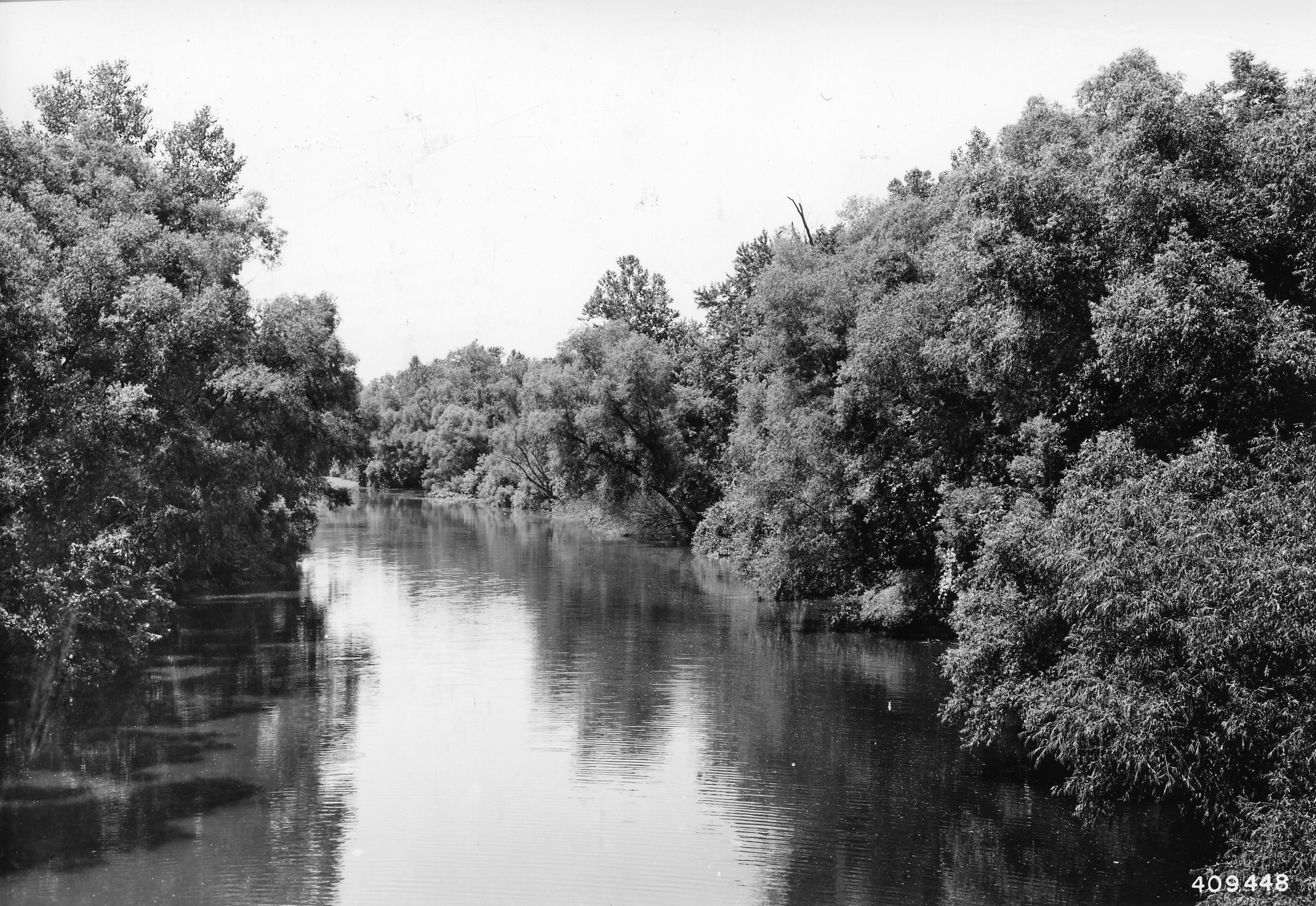
Big Muddy near Sand Ridge

The Big Muddy basin contains a significant portion of the planet's coal reserves. Most of this is hidden under its deep mud. At a few places the river has eroded the sides of hills, exposing coal deposits. The first coal mine in Illinois is believed to have been opened in 1810 on the banks of the Big Muddy in Jackson County.

The Big Muddy cuts through the Shawnee Hills south of Murphysboro near the confluence with its smaller tributary, Kinkaid Creek. There is a large box canyon known as the Little Grand Canyon. From there, it runs southward roughly twenty miles and meets the Mississippi directly south of Grand Tower. Near its mouth, a small portion of the Big Muddy acts as the dividing line between Jackson and Union counties.

== Tributaries and lakes ==
Major tributaries of the Big Muddy include Beaucoup Creek, the Little Muddy River, Casey Creek, the Middle Fork of the Big Muddy and Crab Orchard Creek. Smaller tributaries include Town Creek, Kinkaid Creek, and Shoal Creek. The basin includes Kinkaid Lake, Rend Lake, Crab Orchard Lake, Devil's Kitchen Lake, Little Grassy Lake and Cedar Lake.

The northern limit of the watershed is north of Kell, about 2 miles (3 km) into Marion County. This is on Casey Creek, which might be properly considered the main reach of the river.

== Cities and counties ==
Cities and towns in the Big Muddy watershed include:

- Benton
- Carbondale
- Dix (partially in)
- DuQuoin
- Herrin
- Kell
- Marion
- Mt. Vernon
- Murphysboro
- Pinckneyville
- Thompsonville
- West Frankfort
- Vergennes

The Big Muddy drains areas of the following counties:

- Franklin County
- Jackson County
- Jefferson County
- Marion County
- Perry County
- Union County
- Washington County
- Williamson County

== See also ==
- Big Muddy (disambiguation)
- List of Illinois rivers
