= Big Muddy River Correctional Center =

Prison in Illinois, United States

Coordinates: 38°07′52″N 88°54′28″W

- Interactive map of Big Muddy River Correctional Center
- Location: 251 IL-37 Ina, Illinois
- Status: Medium
- Capacity: 1,958
- Opened: March 1993
- Managed by: Illinois Department of Corrections

The Big Muddy River Correctional Center is a medium-security state prison for men located in Ina, Jefferson County, Illinois, owned and operated by the Illinois Department of Corrections.

The facility was first opened in 1993, and has a working capacity of 1,958. It is notable for being the only state prison in Illinois to have a SDP (Sexually Dangerous Person) treatment program. Adler University offers online college classes for those incarcerated at Big Muddy.
