= Goshen Road =

Goshen Road was an early road that ran from Old Shawneetown, Illinois, on the Ohio River, northwest to the Goshen Settlement, near Glen Carbon, Illinois, near the Mississippi River. In the early 19th century, this was the main east/west road in Illinois.

== History ==
Goshen Road started as a natural, or pioneer, trace: a route that was used by Native Americans and migrating animals. The road was not a definite, marked out path. It was, rather, a collection of vague, parallel paths that crossed, shifting with the season and over the years.

Eventually the demand for salt solidified the road's importance. "The builders of Goshen Road looked east, striving toward a place where they could obtain their necessity - salt," wrote historian Barbara Burr Hubbs. Salt was one of the dearest commodities that early settlers had and one of the most difficult to obtain. Settlers at Goshen at one time bought it eagerly for $9 a barrel.

John Reynolds, later Governor of Illinois, adds, "In the fall of 1808 a wagon road was laid off from Goshen settlement to the Ohio River salt works which in olden times was called The Goshen Road." The southern stretch of the road was permanently laid out in an interesting way to find a direct route without surveying. They led a mare a day's journey away from her foal - then turned her loose. Rough blazes were cut on trees as the mare took the instinctive straightest course back to her foal.
