= Rend Lake =

Water reservoir in Southern Illinois

- Location within Illinois
- Location: Franklin / Jefferson counties, Illinois, U.S.
- Coordinates: 38°2′12.18″N 88°58′0.25″W
- Type: Reservoir
- Primary inflows: Big Muddy River; Casey Creek
- Primary outflows: Big Muddy River
- Basin countries: United States
- Max. length: 13 miles (20.9 km)
- Max. width: 3 miles (4.8 km)
- Surface area: 18,900 acres (76.5 km^{2})
- Average depth: 10 feet (3.0 m)
- Max. depth: 35 feet (10.7 m)
- Shore length^{1}: 162 miles (260.7 km)
- Surface elevation: 405 feet (123.4 m)
- Settlements: Benton, Illinois; Sesser, Illinois
- ^{1} Shore length is not a well-defined measure.

Rend Lake is a 13-mile-long (21 km), 3-mile wide (4.8 km) reservoir located in Southern Illinois in Franklin and Jefferson Counties near the town of Benton. It covers 18,900 acres (76 km^{2}), stores 185,000 acre-feet (228,000,000 m^{3}) of water, and supplies over 15 million U.S. gallons (57 Ml) of water per day to 300,000 persons in over 60 communities. The reservoir is up to 35 feet (10.7 m) deep, but its average depth is closer to 9.7 feet (3.0 m). Its elevation is 405 feet (123.4 m) above sea level.

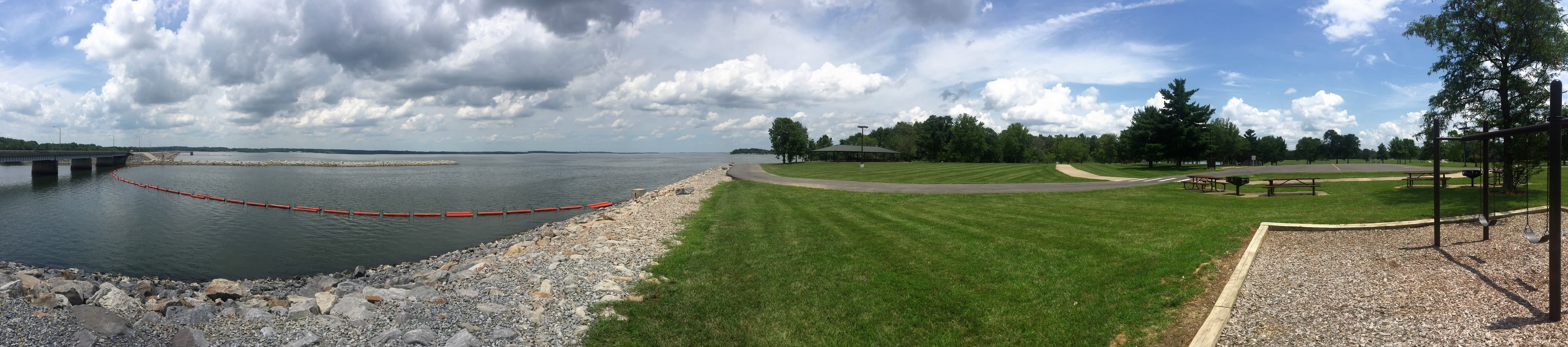
View of Rend Lake. Photo taken from the Eastern side, near Loch Ness citing.

Rend Lake was created when the United States Army Corps of Engineers dammed the Big Muddy River. The dam and lake were authorized in 1962, but the lake was not completely filled until March 1973.

The shoreline of Rend Lake extends 162 miles (261 km), part of which is preserved as Wayne Fitzgerrell State Recreation Area. Swimming beaches at North Marcum and South Sandusky are managed and maintained by the US Army Corps of Engineers. An adjacent Illinois Artisans Shop & Visitors Center is part of the Illinois State Museum system and is operated by the Illinois Department of Natural Resources.

In 2010, Rend Lake was designated as an Important Bird Area of Illinois.

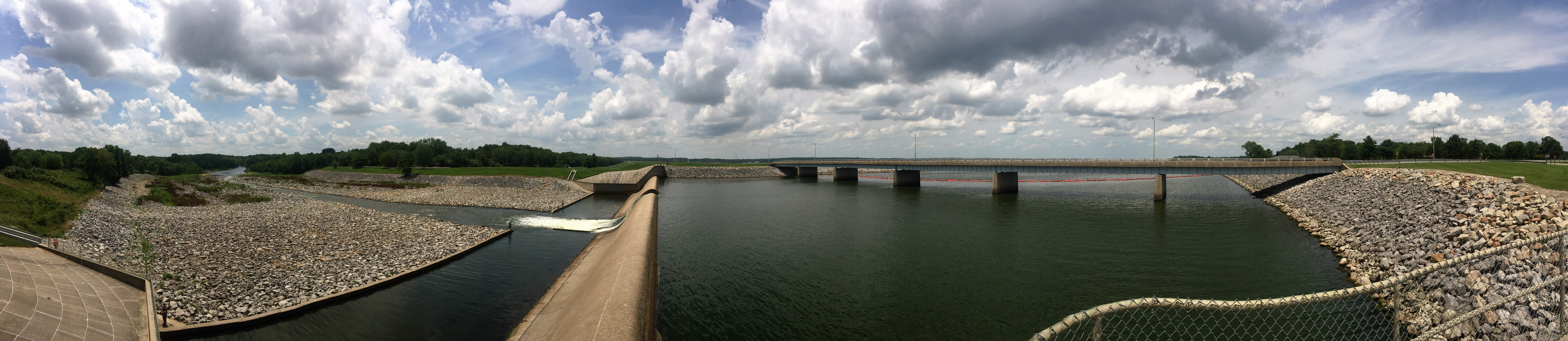
View of spillway at Rend Lake, taken from the Eastern side.

== Fishing ==
Rend Lake is one of the largest lakes in Illinois and is home to some of the top ranked fishing. Recognized species in Rend Lake are the following :

| Species Name | Avg. Weight | Avg. Length |
|---|---|---|
| Largemouth Bass | 3–5 Lbs. | 17–22 in |
| Crappie | 0.5–1.5 Lbs. | 6–12 in |
| Bluegill | 0.5–1.0 Lbs. | 6–10 in |
| Channel Catfish | 10–20 Lbs. | 25–35 in |
| Flathead Catfish | 15–30 Lbs. | 30–38 in |
| Blue catfish | 15–35 Lbs. | 30–40 in |
| Carp | 9–19 Lbs. | 20–35 in |
| White bass | 2–4 Lbs. | 15–20 in |
