= List of airports in Illinois =

This is a list of airports in Illinois (a U.S. state), grouped by type and sorted by location. It contains all public-use and military airports in the state. Some private-use and former airports may be included where notable, such as previously public-use airports, those with commercial enplanements recorded by the FAA or airports assigned an IATA airport code.

This list contains the following information:

- **City served** – The city generally associated with the airport, as per the airport's master record with the Federal Aviation Administration. This is not always the actual location since some airports are located in smaller towns outside of the city they serve. It is not meant to be a complete list of cities served, which can be found in or added to each airport's Wikipedia article.
- **FAA** – The location identifier assigned by the Federal Aviation Administration (FAA).
- **IATA** – The airport code assigned by the International Air Transport Association (IATA). Those that do not match the FAA code are shown in bold.
- **ICAO** – The location indicator assigned by the International Civil Aviation Organization (ICAO).
- **Airport name** – The official airport name. Those shown in **bold** indicate the airport has scheduled passenger service on commercial airlines.
- **Role** – One of four FAA airport categories, as per the 2025-2029 National Plan of Integrated Airport Systems (NPIAS) report released September 2024:
  - P-s: Commercial service – primary are publicly owned airports that receive scheduled passenger service and have more than 10,000 passenger boardings (enplanements) each year. Each primary airport is sub-classified by the FAA as one of the following four "hub" types (s):
    - L: Large hub that accounts for at least 1% of total U.S. passenger enplanements.
    - M: Medium hub that accounts for between 0.25% and 1% of total U.S. passenger enplanements.
    - S: Small hub that accounts for between 0.05% and 0.25% of total U.S. passenger enplanements.
    - N: Nonhub that accounts for less than 0.05% of total U.S. passenger enplanements, but more than 10,000 annual enplanements.
  - CS: Commercial service – nonprimary are publicly owned airports that receive scheduled passenger service and have at least 2,500 passenger boardings each year.
  - R: Reliever airports are designated by the FAA to relieve congestion at a large commercial service airport and to provide more general aviation access to the overall community.
  - GA: General aviation airports are the largest single group of airports in the U.S. airport system. They are public-use airports that do not have scheduled service or have scheduled service with less than 2,500 passenger boardings each year.
- **Enplanements** – The number of enplanements (commercial passenger boardings) that occurred at the airport in calendar year 2024, as per FAA records released 2025.

City served	FAA	IATA	ICAO	Airport name	Role	Enplanements (2024)
				**Commercial service – primary airports**		
Belleville	BLV	BLV	KBLV	**MidAmerica St. Louis Airport** / Scott Air Force Base	P-N	152,632
Bloomington / Normal	BMI	BMI	KBMI	**Central Illinois Regional Airport at Bloomington-Normal**	P-N	161,971
Champaign / Urbana / Savoy	CMI	CMI	KCMI	**University of Illinois - Willard Airport**	P-N	86,626
Chicago	MDW	MDW	KMDW	**Chicago Midway International Airport**	P-L	10,360,093
Chicago	ORD	ORD	KORD	**Chicago O'Hare International Airport**	P-L	38,575,693
Decatur	DEC	DEC	KDEC	**Decatur Airport**	P-N	12,747
Marion	MWA	MWA	KMWA	**Veterans Airport of Southern Illinois** (Williamson County Regional Airport)	P-N	13,816
Moline	MLI	MLI	KMLI	**Quad Cities International Airport**	P-N	326,888
Peoria	PIA	PIA	KPIA	**Peoria International Airport**	P-N	343,114
Rockford	RFD	RFD	KRFD	**Chicago Rockford International Airport** (was Northwest Chicagoland Regional Airport at Rockford)	P-N	132,154
Springfield	SPI	SPI	KSPI	**Abraham Lincoln Capital Airport**	P-N	51,784
				**Commercial service – nonprimary airports**		
Quincy	UIN	UIN	KUIN	**Quincy Regional Airport** (Baldwin Field)	CS	4,112
				**Reliever airports**		
Alton / St. Louis	ALN	ALN	KALN	St. Louis Regional Airport	R	0
Aurora	ARR	**AUZ**	KARR	Aurora Municipal Airport	R	11
Cahokia / St. Louis	CPS	CPS	KCPS	St. Louis Downtown Airport	R	5,925
Lake in the Hills	3CK			Lake in the Hills Airport	R	0
Lansing	IGQ		KIGQ	Lansing Municipal Airport	R	0
Prospect Heights / Wheeling	PWK	PWK	KPWK	Chicago Executive Airport (was Palwaukee Municipal Airport)	R	405
Romeoville	LOT	LOT	KLOT	Lewis University Airport	R	26
Waukegan	UGN	UGN	KUGN	Waukegan National Airport	R	126
West Chicago	DPA	DPA	KDPA	DuPage Airport (DuPage County)	R	105
				**General aviation airports**		
Beardstown	K06			Greater Beardstown Airport	GA	0
Benton	H96			Benton Municipal Airport	GA	0
Bolingbrook	1C5			Bolingbrook's Clow International Airport	GA	4
Cairo	CIR	CIR	KCIR	Cairo Regional Airport	GA	0
Canton	CTK		KCTK	Ingersoll Airport	GA	1
Carbondale / Murphysboro	MDH	MDH	KMDH	Southern Illinois Airport	GA	435
Carmi	CUL		KCUL	Carmi Municipal Airport	GA	0
Casey	1H8			Casey Municipal Airport	GA	2
Centralia	ENL	ENL	KENL	Centralia Municipal Airport	GA	0
Danville	DNV	DNV	KDNV	Vermilion Regional Airport	GA	0
DeKalb	DKB		KDKB	DeKalb Taylor Municipal Airport	GA	0
Dixon	C73			Dixon Municipal Airport (Charles R. Walgreen Field)	GA	0
Effingham	1H2			Effingham County Memorial Airport	GA	3
Fairfield	FWC		KFWC	Fairfield Municipal Airport	GA	0
Freeport	FEP	FEP	KFEP	Albertus Airport	GA	0
Galesburg	GBG	GBG	KGBG	Galesburg Municipal Airport	GA	167
Grayslake	C81			Campbell Airport	GA	0
Greenville	GRE	GRE	KGRE	Greenville Airport	GA	0
Greenwood / Wonder Lake	10C			Galt Field	GA	0
Harrisburg	HSB	HSB	KHSB	Harrisburg-Raleigh Airport	GA	0
Harvard	0C0			Dacy Airport	GA	0
Havana	9I0			Havana Regional Airport	GA	0
Jacksonville	IJX	IJX	KIJX	Jacksonville Municipal Airport	GA	4
Joliet	JOT	JOT	KJOT	Joliet Regional Airport	GA	0
Kankakee	IKK	IKK	KIKK	Greater Kankakee Airport	GA	12
Kewanee	EZI		KEZI	Kewanee Municipal Airport	GA	0
Lacon	C75			Marshall County Airport	GA	0
Lawrenceville	LWV	LWV	KLWV	Lawrenceville-Vincennes International Airport	GA	0
Lincoln	AAA		KAAA	Logan County Airport	GA	0
Litchfield	3LF			Litchfield Municipal Airport	GA	0
Macomb	MQB	MQB	KMQB	Macomb Municipal Airport	GA	0
Mattoon / Charleston	MTO	MTO	KMTO	Coles County Memorial Airport	GA	112
Metropolis	M30			Metropolis Municipal Airport	GA	0
Monee	C56			Bult Field	GA	0
Monmouth	C66			Monmouth Municipal Airport	GA	0
Morris	C09			Morris Municipal Airport (James R. Washburn Field)	GA	0
Mount Carmel	AJG		KAJG	Mount Carmel Municipal Airport	GA	0
Mount Sterling	I63			Mount Sterling Municipal Airport	GA	0
Mount Vernon	MVN	MVN	KMVN	Mount Vernon Airport	GA	0
Olney / Noble	OLY	OLY	KOLY	Olney-Noble Airport	GA	0
Paris	PRG		KPRG	Edgar County Airport	GA	0
Pekin	C15			Pekin Municipal Airport	GA	0
Peoria	3MY			Mount Hawley Auxiliary Airport	GA	0
Peru	VYS	VYS	KVYS	Illinois Valley Regional Airport (Walter A. Duncan Field)	GA	0
Pinckneyville	PJY		KPJY	Pinckneyville-DuQuoin Airport	GA	0
Pittsfield	PPQ		KPPQ	Pittsfield Penstone Municipal Airport	GA	0
Pontiac	PNT		KPNT	Pontiac Municipal Airport	GA	0
Poplar Grove	C77			Poplar Grove Airport	GA	0
Rantoul	TIP		KTIP	Rantoul National Aviation Center (Frank Elliott Field)	GA	0
Robinson	RSV		KRSV	Crawford County Airport (was Robinson Municipal)	GA	0
Rochelle	RPJ		KRPJ	Rochelle Municipal Airport (Koritz Field)	GA	0
Salem	SLO	SLO	KSLO	Salem-Leckrone Airport	GA	0
Savanna	SFY		KSFY	Tri-Township Airport	GA	0
Schaumburg	4H1			Schaumburg Municipal Helistop	GA	0
Schaumburg	06C			Schaumburg Regional Airport	GA	2
Shelbyville	2H0			Shelby County Airport	GA	0
Sparta	SAR	SAR	KSAR	Sparta Community Airport (Hunter Field)	GA	0
Sterling / Rock Falls	SQI	SQI	KSQI	Whiteside County Airport (Jos. H. Bittorf Field)	GA	0
Taylorville	TAZ		KTAZ	Taylorville Municipal Airport	GA	6
Tuscola	K96			Tuscola Airport	GA	0
Vandalia	VLA	VLA	KVLA	Vandalia Municipal Airport	GA	0
				**Other public-use airports** (not listed in NPIAS)		
Aledo	C00			Mercer County Airport		
Columbia	IL91			Sackman Field (formerly H49)		
Compton	C82			Bresson Airport		
Dwight	DTG		KDTG	Dwight Airport		
Erie	3H5			Erie Air Park		
Freeport	C86			Freeport/Dornink Airport		
Geneseo	3G8			Gen-Airpark		
Highland	H07			Highland-Winet Airport		
Hinckley	0C2			Hinckley Airport		
Kankakee	3KK			Kankakee Airport		
Moline	I04			Quad-City Seaplane Base		
Mount Morris	C55			Ogle County Airport		
Newark	0C8			Cushing Field		
Ottawa	8N2			Skydive Chicago Airport		
Palmyra	5K1			Zelmer Memorial Airpark		
Paxton	1C1			Paxton Airport		
Rockford	1C8			Cottonwood Airport		
Rushville	5K4			Schuy-Rush Airport		
Urbana	C16			Frasca Field		
Watson	2T2			Percival Springs Airport		
Yates City	2C6			Tri-County Airport		
				**Notable private-use airports**		
Apple River	IL28			Foster Field		
Bradford	3IS8	BDF		Rinkenberger RLA Airport		
Manito	IL45			Palmer Flying Service Airport (former public use as Manito Mitchell Airport, FAA: C45)		
Marseilles	67IL	MMO	KMMO	Marseilles Island/Mitchell RLA Airport		
Mendota	IL22			Grandpa's Farm Mendota Airport		
St. Jacob	IL48			St. Louis Metro-East Airport (Shafer Field)		
Zion	IL02			Ravenwood Airport (Formerly Herbert C. Maas)		
				**Notable former airports**		
Carthage	~~I48~~			Carthage Airport (closed)		
Chicago	~~CGX~~	~~CGX~~	~~KCGX~~	Meigs Field (closed 2003)		
Crestwood	~~3HW~~			Crestwood/Howell Airport (closed)		
Earlville	~~C94~~			Earlville Airport (closed 2010)		
Hillsboro	~~3K4~~			Hillsboro Municipal Airport (closed 2008)		
Lostant	~~2V3~~			Hartenbower Hectares Airport		
Monticello	~~2K0~~			Piatt County Airport		
New Lenox	~~1C2~~			Howell-New Lenox Airport (closed)		
Springfield				Springfield (Commercial) Southwest Municipal Airport (closed 1962-1964)		
Springfield				Bosa Field/Lindbergh Field (1926 - 1929)		

== See also ==
- Essential Air Service
- Illinois World War II Army Airfields
- List of intercity bus stops in Illinois
- Wikipedia:WikiProject Aviation/Airline destination lists: North America#Illinois
