= C94 =

C94 may refer to:

- Ruy Lopez, Breyer Variation chess openings ECO code
- Other leukaemias of specified cell type ICD-10 code
- Labour Clauses (Public Contracts) Convention, 1949 code
- Earlville Airport in Earlville, Illinois FAA LID
