= Mercer County Airport =

Mercer County Airport may refer to:

- Mercer County Airport (Illinois) in Aledo, Illinois, United States (FAA: C00)
- Mercer County Airport (West Virginia) in Bluefield, West Virginia, United States (FAA: BLF)
- Mercer County Regional Airport in Hazen, North Dakota, United States (FAA: HZE)
- Trenton-Mercer Airport, formerly Mercer County Airport, in Trenton, New Jersey, United States (FAA: TTN)
