= C55 =

C55 or C-55 may refer to:

- ARM Teniente Juan de la Barrera (C55), an Admirable-class minesweeper of the Mexican Navy
- Beechcraft C55 Baron, an American civil utility aircraft
- C55-isoprenyl pyrophosphate
- Caldwell 55, a planetary nebula
- Curtiss C-55 Commando, an American transport aircraft
- JNR Class C55, a Japanese steam locomotive
- Ogle County Airport in Mount Morris, Illinois
- Shipowners' Liability (Sick and Injured Seamen) Convention, 1936 of the International Labour Organization
- Xingu corydoras, a tropical freshwater fish
- C55, a Wordtank Japanese electronic dictionary
