= Hillsboro Municipal Airport =

Hillsboro Municipal Airport may refer to:

- Hillsboro Municipal Airport (Illinois) (FAA: 3K4) in Hillsboro, Illinois, United States
- Hillsboro Municipal Airport (North Dakota) (FAA: 3H4) in Hillsboro, North Dakota, United States
- Hillsboro Municipal Airport (Texas) (FAA: INJ) in Hillsboro, Texas, United States
- Hillsboro Airport or Portland-Hillsboro Airport (FAA: HIO) serving Portland and located in Hillsboro, Oregon, United States
