= Marshall Airport =

Marshall Airport may refer to:

- Baltimore/Washington International Thurgood Marshall Airport in Baltimore, Maryland, United States (FAA: BWI)
- Marshall Don Hunter Sr. Airport in Marshall, Alaska, United States (FAA: MDM, IATA:MLL)
- Marshall Memorial Municipal Airport in Marshall, Missouri, United States (FAA: MHL)

Airports in places named Marshall:

- Brooks Field (Michigan) in Marshall, Michigan, USA (FAA: RMY)
- Harrison County Airport (Texas) in Marshall, Texas, United States (FAA: ASL)
- Searcy County Airport in Marshall, Arkansas, United States (FAA: 4A5)
- Southwest Minnesota Regional Airport, also known as Marshall/Ryan Field, in Marshall, Minnesota, United States (FAA: MML)

== See also ==
- Marshall County Airport (disambiguation)
