= Dwight Airport =

Public use airport in Illinois, United States

Coordinates: 41°07′57″N 88°26′24″W

- IATA: none; ICAO: KDTG; FAA LID: DTG

Summary
- Owner/Operator: Dwight Aero Service
- Location: Dwight, Illinois
- Time zone: UTC-06:00 (-6)
  - Summer (DST): UTC-05:00 (-5)
- Elevation AMSL: 632 ft (193 m)
- Website: http://www.dwightaeroservice.com/
- Interactive map of Dwight Airport

Dwight Airport is a public-use airport located three miles north of Dwight, Illinois. The airport is privately owned by the Dwight Aero Service.

The largest airports close to Dwight are the Greater Kankakee Airport and Chicago's Midway International Airport.

== Facilities and aircraft ==
Dwight Airport has two runways: runway 9/27 measures 2364 x 21 ft (721 x 6 m) and is constructed of both asphalt and turf. Runway 18/26 is 1900 x 100 ft (579 x 30 m) and made of turf.

Fuel is available at the airport.

For the 12-month period ending November 30, 2018, the airport has 38 operations per week, consisting entirely of general aviation. For the same time period, there are 11 aircraft based at the field: 9 single-engine airplanes and 2 ultralights.

== Accidents and incidents ==
- On July 27, 2016, a VANS RV4 crashed off the end of one of Dwight's runways while attempting a go-around. The sole pilot onboard was rescued uninjured.
- On April 19, 2019, a Piper PA28 was substantially damaged while performing a precautionary landing at the Dwight Airport. While responding to a rough-running engine, the pilot of the aircraft decided to land after his tests in flight did not help the situation. Upon landing, the aircraft drifted off the runway, and the nose landing gear collapsed during the landing sequence. The cause of the incident was found to be a partial loss of engine power due to a restriction in fuel flow for undetermined reasons. None of the aircraft's occupants were injured.

== See also ==
- List of airports in Illinois
