= Shelby Airport (disambiguation) =

Shelby Airport may refer to:

- Shelby Airport in Shelby, Montana, United States (FAA: SBX)
- Shelby-Cleveland County Regional Airport in Shelby, North Carolina, United States (FAA: EHO)
- Shelby Community Airport in Shelby, Ohio, United States (FAA: 12G)

== See also ==
- Shelby County Airport (disambiguation)
