= AJG =

AJG may refer to:

- The American Journal of Gastroenterology, a medical journal
- Arthur J. Gallagher & Co., an insurance brokerage and risk management services company
- Mount Carmel Municipal Airport (FAA location identifier code AJG)
