= Ingersoll Airport =

- IATA: none; ICAO: KCTK; FAA LID: CTK

Summary
- Airport type: Public
- Owner: Canton Park District
- Serves: Canton, Illinois
- Elevation AMSL: 684 ft (208 m)
- Coordinates: 40°34′09″N 90°04′29″W

Maps
- Location of Fulton County in Illinois

- Location of airport in Fulton County

Runways
Direction	Length		Surface
Direction	ft	m	Surface
9/27	3,295	1,004	Asphalt
18/36	3,899	1,188	Asphalt

Statistics (2008)
- Aircraft operations: 19,000
- Based aircraft: 32
- Source: Federal Aviation Administration

Ingersoll Airport (ICAO: KCTK, FAA LID: CTK) is a public use airport located two nautical miles (2.3 mi; 3.7 km) northwest of the central business district of Canton, a city in Fulton County, Illinois, United States. The airport is owned by the Canton Park District. It is included in the FAA's National Plan of Integrated Airport Systems for 2011–2015, which categorized it as a general aviation facility.

Although many U.S. airports use the same three-letter location identifier for the FAA and IATA, this facility is assigned CTK by the FAA but has no designation from the IATA.

The airport received $360,000 as part of the Rebuild Illinois program to help the airport repair and maintain facilities during the COVID-19 pandemic.

== Facilities and aircraft ==
Ingersoll Airport covers an area of 232 acres (94 ha) at an elevation of 684 feet (208 m) above mean sea level. It has two asphalt paved runways: 18/36 is 3,899 by 75 feet (1,188 by 23 m) and 9/27 is 3,295 by 60 feet (1,004 by 18 m).

For the 12-month period ending May 31, 2021, the airport has an average of 52 aircraft operations per day, or roughly 19,000 per year. All traffic consists of general aviation. For that same period, there are 18 aircraft based on the airport: 17 single-engine and 1 multiengine.

The airport has an FBO run by the Canton Park District. Fuel is available.

== Accidents & Incidents ==
- On October 12, 2017, a Eurocopter MBB-BK 117 C-2 crashed at Ingersoll during a training flight at night. The probable cause was found to be the flight instructor's cyclic control during a hover, resulting in a hard landing. The aircraft's main rotor was substantially damaged.

== See also ==
- List of airports in Illinois
