= Erie Air Park =

- IATA: none; ICAO: none; FAA LID: 3H5

Summary
- Airport type: Public use
- Owner: James E. Robinson
- Serves: Erie, Illinois
- Elevation AMSL: 600 ft (180 m)
- Coordinates: 41°40′57″N 090°04′43″W
- Interactive map of Erie Air Park

Runways
| Direction | Length | | Surface |
| Direction | ft | m | Surface |
|---|---|---|---|
| 18U/36U | 2,000 | 610 | Turf |

Statistics (2019)
- Aircraft operations: 6,000
- Based aircraft: 27
- Source: Federal Aviation Administration

Erie Air Park (FAA LID: 3H5) is a privately owned public use ultralight airport located one nautical mile (1.85 km) north of the central business district of Erie, a village in Whiteside County, Illinois, United States.

== Facilities and aircraft ==
Erie Air Park covers an area of 26 acres (11 ha) at an elevation of 600 feet (183 m) above mean sea level. It has one runway designated 18U/36U with a turf surface measuring 2,000 by 200 feet (610 x 61 m).

For the 12-month period ending August 31, 2019, the airport averaged 115 aircraft operations per week, or roughly 6,000 per year, consisting completely of general aviation. At that time there were 27 single-engine airplanes based at this airport.

The airport has over two dozen hangars and sees significant local and transient traffic.

== See also ==
- List of airports in Illinois
