= Galt Field =

Airport in Wonder Lake, McHenry County, Illinois

- IATA: none; ICAO: none; FAA LID: 10C

Summary
- Location: Wonder Lake, Illinois, U.S.
- Elevation AMSL: 875 ft (267 m)
- Coordinates: 42°24′10.4″N 88°22′30.4″W

Map
- Location within Illinois Location within the United States

Runways
Direction	Length		Surface
Direction	ft	m	Surface
9/27	2,802	854	Asphalt
18/36	2,141	653	Turf

Statistics (2019)
- Aircraft movements: 40,000
- Based Aircraft: 32

Galt Field is a small, privately owned, public-use airport located in McHenry County, Illinois, United States. It is located about 1 mile (1.6 km) north of the village of Wonder Lake, Illinois. The airport was founded in 1950 by local farmer and pilot Arthur T. Galt Jr., who initially developed an airstrip on his farmland after taking up flying.

== Facilities and aircraft ==
The airport has two runways: Runway 9/27, which is 2802 x 36 ft (854 x 11 m) and made of asphalt, and Runway 18/36, which is 2141 x 125 ft (653 x 38 m) and made of turf. The airport primarily serves general aviation, and for the 12-month period ending May 31, 2019, the airport averaged 110 operations per day, or about 40,150 per year. There were 32 aircraft based on the airport during that period, which included 30 single-engine and 2 multi-engine airplanes.

The airport has a fixed-base operator that sells fuel and offers basic amenities and services.

The airport is also home to EAA Chapter 932, and it offers a variety of services to its tenants. The airport features an aircraft maintenance shop, hosts ground-school classes for prospective pilots, and offers a fishing pond and fire pit for hangar tenant use.

== Accidents and incidents ==
- On November 25, 2022, an aerobatic Extra EA-300LC piloted by the owner of Galt Field crashed a quarter-mile east of the airport against a tree, off the departure end of runway 9. In February 2023, an investigation into the cause of the crash was ongoing. The NTSB issued a final report December 2024.

== See also ==
- List of airports in Illinois
