= Skydive Chicago Resort =

Skydiving resort in the United States

The Skydive Chicago Airport is a skydiving resort and camping ground in Ottawa, Illinois in the United States. It operates a private airport, Skydive Chicago Airport, and offers spectator-friendly outdoor skydiving. There is an on-site cafe and gift/pro shop for all guests. For skydiving customers, it offers camping, RV parking, and an auditorium. The airport is located on the Fox River. The resort claims to operate the largest fleet of skydiving aircraft in the midwestern United States.

== Airport Information ==
The Skydive Chicago Airport is identified as 8N2 and covers an area of 200 acres at an elevation of 616 feet (188m) above mean sea level and has one paved and 2 grass runways. Runway 3/21 has a 4,522 x 50 ft (1,378 x 15 m) treated asphalt pavement. Runway E/W and N/S have turf surfaces.

== Notable events ==
The airport is home to the 2002, 2007, 2010, 2013, 2014, 2024 U.S. National Skydiving Championships. The resort hosted the 2016 World Championships of Skydiving - the largest skydiving event in the world. It is also home to World Vertical Formation and National Gold and Silver Formation Skydiving medalist teams.

Skydive Chicago is also the brainchild behind a remote competition called Cloud Games that allows competitors at their home skydiving centers to compete, using rated, remote judges, a web based scoring system and crowns its winners virtually.

The resort is also home to multiple state records and several World Records in different categories:

- 1998 242-Way Formation Skydiving World Record
- 2005 18-Way Women's Vertical World Record
- 2018 3 & 4 Point 42-Way Vertical Sequential World Records
- 2007 69-Way Vertical World Record
- 2009 108-Way Vertical World Record
- 2012 138-Way Vertical World Record
- 2015 164-Way Vertical World Record (current standing Vertical World Record as of 2024)
- 2021 2-Point 77-Way Vertical Sequential World Record

The resort was the home of a 200-person "head-down vertical" skydiving jump in an attempt to break a world record by completing the largest single-point skydive ever, in attempt to break its own record. Jumpers climbed up to 19,000 feet before jumping out of the planes, linking up, and holding the position before separating to pull their parachutes. The attempt was eventually cut down to 170 in hopes it would make the world record easier to accomplish. The group plans to regroup in 2025.

== Services ==
The center offers tandem jumps for first time skydivers, has a skydiving school to train people to earn their basic license, and offers events for all skill levels for the different disciplines of skydiving. Its flagship event is Summerfest that brings 600+ jumpers from around the world to jump with their local talent and from their aircraft fleet. 2024's Summerfest held a fundraiser for the United States Parachute Team.

Skydive Chicago also offers a Spectator Experience welcoming non jumpers to get a behind the scenes experience of the sport and they also rent their facilities.

== Accidents ==
The center has had a few accidents in its history. 19 deaths occurred between 1993 and 2023 at the facility out of approximately 2 million skydives completed in its 32 years of operation. There have been no tandem or first time skydiving fatalities. The national organization, United States Parachute Association, reports in 2023 3.65 million skydives took place around the country, claiming 10 civilian fatalities. They also stated the 2021 and 2022 reported record low fatalities.
