= Mount Vernon Airport =

Airport in Illinois, United States

Mt. Vernon Outland Airport
- IATA: MVN; ICAO: KMVN; FAA LID: MVN

Summary
- Airport type: Public
- Operator: Mount Vernon Airport Authority
- Location: Mount Vernon, Illinois
- Time zone: UTC−06:00 (-6)
  - Summer (DST): UTC−05:00 (-5)
- Elevation AMSL: 480 ft / 146.3 m
- Coordinates: 38°19′24″N 88°51′31″W

Map
- Location of airport in Illinois MVN (the United States)

Runways
| Direction | Length | | Surface |
| Direction | ft | m | Surface |
|---|---|---|---|
| 5/23 | 6,498 | 1,981 | Asphalt |
| 15/33 | 3,149 | 960 | Asphalt |

Statistics (2021)
- Aircraft Movements: 27,000
- Based Aircraft: 38

Mount Vernon Outland Airport (IATA: MVN, ICAO: KMVN) is a civil public use airport three miles (5 km) east of Mount Vernon, in Jefferson County, Illinois.

The airport is named for longtime airport board member Earl Outland. It is home to EAA Chapter 1155.

== History ==
Mount Vernon Outland Airport has no scheduled airline, but it was once served by Air Kentucky doing business as US Airways Express. From the 1960s through the mid-1980s, the airport was also served by Ozark Airlines. This ended with Ozark Airlines' sale to Trans World Airlines (TWA) in 1986.

The airport was a stop in the 45th annual Air Race Classic in 2022 when a group of pilots raced parts across America. The airport was originally set to be a stop in the 2020 version, which was put on hold because of the COVID-19 pandemic.

In 2022, an Air Evac EMS base announced it would relocate to Mount Vernon after the airport's board of commissioners reached an agreement with the Air Evac management company. The agreement brings one of the busiest bases in the Air Evac Lifeteam’s nationwide network to Mount Vernon.

A contract to build the new base was approved in 2023. No timeline was provided on the project's completion.

== Facilities and aircraft ==
Mount Vernon Airport covers 1,100 acres (445 ha) and has two runways. Runway 5/23 measures 6,498 by 150 ft (1,981 by 46 m) and is paved with asphalt. Runway 15/33 measures 3,149 by 100 ft (960 by 30 m) and is also asphalt.

The airport has a fixed-base operator that sells fuel. It offers services such as general maintenance, oxygen services, catering, hangars, and courtesy transportation; it offers amenities such as conference rooms, pilot supplies, a crew lounge, snooze rooms, showers, and more.

For the 12-month period ending December 31, 2021, the airport has 73 aircraft operations per day, or about 27,000 per year. This is 70% general aviation, 8% air taxi, and 2% military. For the same time period, there are 38 aircraft based on the field: 26 single-engine and 5 multi-engine airplanes, 6 helicopters, and 1 jet.

== See also ==
- List of airports in Illinois
- South Central Transit
