= Dacy Airport =

Privately-owned public-use airport in southwest Harvard, Illinois

Coordinates: 42°24′12″N 088°37′53″W

- IATA: none; ICAO: none; FAA LID: 0C0

Summary
- Owner/Operator: Dacy Airport, LLC
- Serves: Harvard, Illinois
- Location: McHenry County, Illinois
- Opened: 1940s
- Time zone: UTC−06:00 (-6)
  - Summer (DST): UTC−05:00 (-5)
- Elevation AMSL: 913 ft / 278 m
- Interactive map of Dacy Airport

Runways
Direction	Length		Surface
Direction	ft	m	Surface
9/27	3,589	1,094	Turf

Statistics (2022)
- Aircraft movements: 20,000

The Dacy Airport (FAA LID: 0C0) is a privately owned, public-use airport located 1 mile southwest of Harvard, Illinois, United States.

== History ==
Dacy Airport was founded just after World War II by B-24 Bomber chief John Dacy and his wife Elsie. The two have since been inducted into the Illinois Aviation Hall of Fame.

The airport features flight training services, along with aircraft maintenance facilities that can perform major repairs and overhauls.

== Facilities and aircraft ==
The airport has three turf runways. Runway 9/27 measures 3589 x 105 ft (1094 x 32 m); runway 14/32 measures 2633 x 100 ft (803 x 30 m); runway 18/36 measures 2577 x 120 ft (785 x 37 m).

The airport operates its own fixed-base operator (FBO), offering parking and hangars, fuel aircraft rental, a pilot's lounge, work stations, and flight instruction.

For the 12-month period ending June 30, 2022, the airport averages 55 aircraft operations per day, or roughly 20,000 per year. All were general aviation, split evenly between transient and local traffic. For that same time period, there were 34 aircraft based on the field: 32 single-engine and 2 multi-engine airplanes.

== Accidents and incidents ==
- On August 24, 2022, a Stearman B75 biplane crashed while landing at Dacy Airport. The plane drifted right and nosed over into a field after landing. The plane suffered substantial damage, but the pilot was uninjured. The accident is under investigation.

== Ground transportation ==
While no public transit service is provided directly to the airport, Pace provides bus service nearby.

== See also ==
- List of airports in Illinois
- Harvard station
