= Benton Municipal Airport =

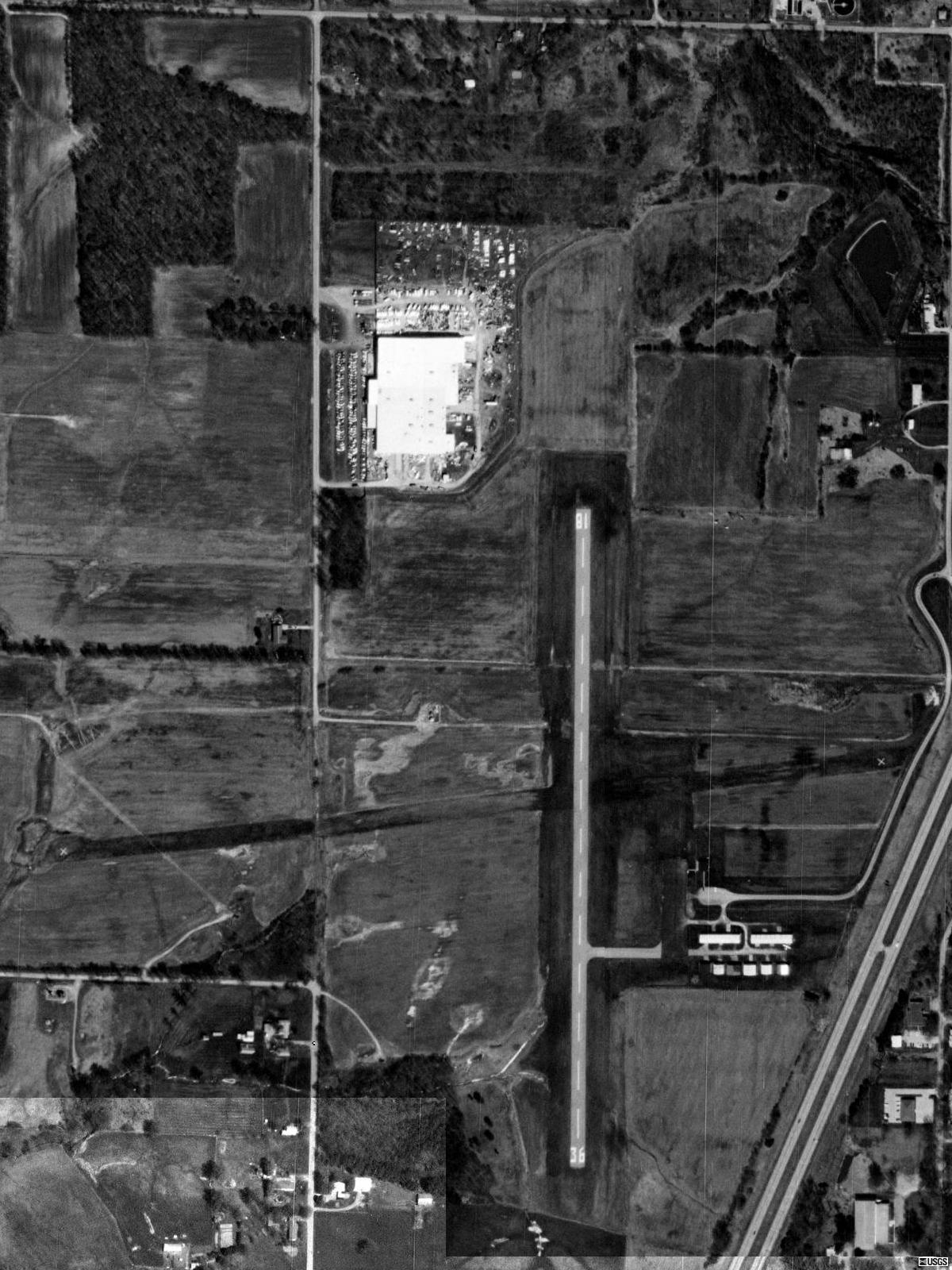
- USGS aerial image - 6 April 1998
- IATA: none; ICAO: none; FAA LID: H96

Summary
- Airport type: Public
- Owner: City of Benton
- Serves: Benton, Illinois
- Elevation AMSL: 444 ft (135 m)
- Coordinates: 38°00′24″N 088°56′04″W

Map
- Location of airport in Illinois H96 (the United States)

Runways
| Direction | Length | | Surface |
| Direction | ft | m | Surface |
|---|---|---|---|
| 18/36 | 4,000 | 1,219 | Asphalt |

Statistics (2007)
- Aircraft operations: 8,000
- Based aircraft: 10
- Source: Federal Aviation Administration

Benton Municipal Airport (FAA LID: H96) is a city-owned, public-use airport located 1 nautical mile (1.9 km; 1.2 mi) west of the central business district of Benton, a city in Franklin County, Illinois, United States. This airport is included in the FAA's National Plan of Integrated Airport Systems (2009–2013), which categorizes it as a general aviation airport. The airport was named 2014 Illinois General Aviation Airport of the Year.

== Facilities and aircraft ==
Benton Municipal Airport covers an area of 110 acres (45 ha) at an elevation of 444 feet (135 m) above mean sea level. It has one runway designated 18/36 with an asphalt surface measuring 4,002 by 75 feet (1,220 x 23 m). The runway was expanded in 2003; it previously measured 2,720 by 60 feet (829 x 18 m).

The aircraft offers a number of services for local and transient aircraft, including tie-downs and hangars for parking. A local flight club is based at the airport to provide flight training and aircraft rental.

For the 12-month period ending July 31, 2019, the airport had just over 8,000 aircraft operations, an average of 22 per day: 94% general aviation, 5% air taxi and 1% military. At that time there were 9 aircraft based at this airport, all airplanes: 8 single-engine and 1 multi-engine.

== See also ==
- List of airports in Illinois
- South Central Transit
