= Cottonwood Airport (Illinois) =

Public Airport in Rockford, Illinois

Coordinates: 42°17′30″N 89°8′10″W

Cottonwood Airport is a public use airport located two-mile (3.2 km) northwest of Rockford, Illinois. The airport is privately owned. The airport is one of multiple airports in Rockford; the city's main airport, located six miles (9.7 km) south of Cottonwood, is the Chicago/Rockford International Airport.

The airport is home to EAA Chapter 22. The airport hosts year-round events like fly-ins and events around the annual AirVenture event in Oshkosh, Wisconsin.

== History ==
Cotton Airport was founded in 1946 with north/sound and east–west runways on 86 acres (35 ha) of land. In its early years, the airport was mostly used for flight training. As the airport changed hands between 1946 and 1977, its status changed multiple times from non-use to restricted to public use.

The airport kept changing ownership until 1985, when The Cottonwood Corporation was formed in order to buy the airport and keep it from closing permanently. A set number of stocks in the airport were sold to pay the down payment, and additional stockholders have been brought in since to help pay for airport maintenance.

== Facilities and aircraft ==
The airport has one runway, designated as Runway 18/36 and measuring 2,540 ft × 260 ft (774 m × 79 m). The airport does not have an FBO, fuel, or any flying clubs.

Cottonwood Airport has 25 aircraft operations per day, or just over 9000 per year. All this traffic is general aviation. For the same time period, there are 44 aircraft based on the field: 40 single-engine airplanes, two helicopters, and two ultralights.

== Accidents and incidents ==
- On January 19, 2009, a Cessna 172 Skyhawk crashed while attempting to land at Cottonwood Airport. The airport was covered in snow, and the non-instrument-rated pilot attempted to land there as weather deteriorated. During the landing roll, the airplane veered to the left after encountering a low lying snow bank that was obscured by drifting snow. The pilot attempted to regain directional control, but the nose landing gear separated from the airplane when it impacted a second snow bank. The airplane turned 180 degrees and came to rest in a nose down attitude. The probable cause of the accident was found to be the pilot's inability to maintain directional control during the landing roll after contacting a low-lying snow bank that was obscured by drifting snow.
- On September 12, 2010, a gyrocopter practicing landings at the airport crashed. The pilot stated that on the last takeoff, the gyrocopter turned sideways and the momentum of the rotor blades resulted in the gyrocopter rolling onto its side. The probable cause of the accident was found to be the pilot's failure to maintain control of the gyrocopter while practicing takeoffs and landings.
- On August 19, 2012, an experimental amateur-built Jones Kitfox III impacted terrain following a loss of engine power after takeoff from Cottonwood Airport. The probable cause of the accident was found to be the pilot's improper installation of a spark plug, which led to a partial loss of engine power after takeoff and the resultant forced landing.
- On August 14, 2020, an experimental plane crashed during takeoff from Cottonwood. The airplane overran the runway and onto a nearby road, striking a car.

== See also ==
- List of airports in Illinois
