= Kankakee Airport =

- IATA: none; ICAO: none; FAA LID: 3KK

Summary
- Airport type: Public use
- Owner: Roger Koerner, Sr.
- Serves: Kankakee, Illinois
- Elevation AMSL: 625 ft (191 m)
- Coordinates: 41°05′47″N 087°54′38″W
- Public transit access: SHOW Bus

Map
- Location of airport in Illinois 3KK (the United States)

Runways
| Direction | Length | | Surface |
| Direction | ft | m | Surface |
|---|---|---|---|
| 9/27 | 2,644 | 806 | Turf |
| 18/36 | 2,564 | 782 | Turf |

Statistics (2012)
- Aircraft operations: 11,000
- Based aircraft: 25
- Source: Federal Aviation Administration

Kankakee Airport (FAA LID: 3KK) is a privately owned, public use airport located three nautical miles (6 km) southwest of the central business district of Kankakee, a city in Kankakee County, Illinois, United States.

== Facilities and aircraft ==
Kankakee Airport covers an area of 280 acres (113 ha) at an elevation of 625 feet (190 m) above mean sea level. It has two runways with turf surfaces: 9/27 is 2,644 by 300 feet (806 x 91 m) and 18/36 is 2,564 by 200 feet (782 x 61 m).

For the 12-month period ending July 31, 2018, the airport had an average of 36 aircraft operations per day, or just over 13,000 total. All were general aviation. At that time there were 45 aircraft based at this airport: 35 single-engine, 6 ultralight, and 4 multi-engine.

== See also ==
- List of airports in Illinois
- Greater Kankakee Airport (FAA: IKK), located at 41°04′17″N 087°50′47″W
