= Schuy-Rush Airport =

Public Airport in Rushville, Illinois

Coordinates: 40°7′2″N 90°35′26″W

- IATA: none; ICAO: none; FAA LID: 5K4

Summary
- Owner/Operator: City of Rushville
- Location: Rushville, Illinois
- Time zone: UTC−06:00 (-6)
  - Summer (DST): UTC−05:00 (-5)
- Elevation AMSL: 665 ft / 203 m
- Interactive map of Schuy-Rush Airport

Runways
Direction	Length		Surface
Direction	ft	m	Surface
9/27	3,565	1,087	Turf

Statistics (2021)
- Aircraft Movements: 996

Schuy-Rush Airport (FAA LID: 5K4) is a public-use airport located one-mile (1.6 km) west of Rushville, Illinois, United States. The airport is publicly owned by the City of Rushville. The closest major airport is Quincy Regional Airport-Baldwin Field, located 30 miles (48 km) west of Schuy-Rush.

The airport received over $300,00 from the Illinois Department of Transportation as part of the Rebuild Illinois program during the COVID-19 pandemic to help it upgrade its facilities.

== Facilities and aircraft ==
The airport has one runway. Runway 9/27 is 3,565 ft × 100 ft (1,087 m × 30 m) and is made of turf. There is no FBO at the airport, and no fuel is available.

For the 12-month period ending May 31, 2021, the airport had 83 operations per month, or about 1000 per year. This traffic was made up completely of general aviation. For the same time period, there were four aircraft based at Schuy-Rush: three single-engine airplanes and one ultralight.

== See also ==
- List of airports in Illinois
