= Cairo Regional Airport =

- IATA: CIR; ICAO: KCIR; FAA LID: CIR

Summary
- Airport type: Public
- Owner/Operator: Alexander County Airports
- Serves: Cairo, Illinois
- Elevation AMSL: 322 ft (98 m)
- Coordinates: 37°03′50″N 089°13′10″W

Map
- Location of airport in Illinois CIR (the United States)

Runways
Direction	Length		Surface
Direction	ft	m	Surface
14/32	4,001	1,220	Asphalt
2/20	3,200	975	Asphalt

Statistics
- Aircraft operations (2020): 9,000
- Based aircraft (2020): 12
- Source: Federal Aviation Administration

Cairo Regional Airport, (IATA: CIR, ICAO: KCIR, FAA LID: CIR) is a county-owned public-use airport located 4 nautical miles (7.4 km; 4.6 mi) northwest of the central business district of Cairo, Illinois, a city in Alexander County, Illinois, United States. It is included in the Federal Aviation Administration (FAA) National Plan of Integrated Airport Systems for 2019–2023, in which it is categorized as a local general aviation facility.

The two closest airports with commercial airline service are Cape Girardeau Regional Airport and Barkley Regional Airport which are both about 23 miles (37 km) away.

== Facilities and aircraft ==
Cairo Regional Airport covers an area of 470 acres (190.2 ha) at an elevation of 322 feet (98 m) above mean sea level. It has two runways: 14/32 is 4,001 by 100 feet (1,220 x 30 m) with an asphalt surface and 2/20 is 3,200 by 60 feet (975 x 16 m) with an asphalt surface.

The airport operates its own fixed-base operator on the field. The FBO offers fuel as well as a cafe, a lounge, rest rooms, flight planning stations, and refreshments.

For the 12-month period ending September 30, 2020, the airport had 9,000 aircraft operations, an average of 25 per day: 94% general aviation and 6% military. For the same time period, there were 12 airplanes based at this airport: 11 single engine and 1 multi engine.

== See also ==
- List of airports in Illinois
