= Marshall County Airport =

Marshall County Airport may refer to:

- Marshall County Airport (Illinois) in Lacon, Illinois, United States (FAA: C75)
- Marshall County Airport (West Virginia) in Moundsville, West Virginia, United States (FAA: MPG)
- Holly Springs-Marshall County Airport in Holly Springs, Mississippi, United States (FAA: M41)
