= Pinckneyville-DuQuoin Airport =

Public use airport in Pinckneyville, Illinois

Coordinates: 37°58′38″N 089°21′38″W

Pinckneyville/Du Quoin Airport
- IATA: none; ICAO: KPJY; FAA LID: PJY

Summary
- Airport type: Public
- Owner: CITIES OF DU QUOIN/PINCKNEYVILLE
- Operator: Sparta Aero Services
- Serves: Pinckneyville, Illinois; Du Quoin, Illinois
- Location: Perry County, Illinois
- Time zone: UTC−06:00 (-6)
  - Summer (DST): UTC−05:00 (-5)
- Elevation AMSL: 400 ft / 122 m
- Interactive map of Pinckneyville/Du Quoin Airport

Runways
Direction	Length		Surface
Direction	ft	m	Surface
18/36	3,999	1,219	Asphalt

Statistics (2021)
- Aircraft Movements: 8,000

The Picnkeyville/Du Quoin Airport (ICAO: KPJY, FAA: PJY) is a civil, public use airport located 6 miles southeast of Pinckneyville and about 9 miles west of Du Quoin, Illinois, United States. The airport is publicly owned by the two cities.

The airport received $100,000 from the State of Illinois as part of the Rebuild Illinois program during the COVID-19 pandemic. The money went toward buying snow removal equipment.

== Facilities and aircraft ==
The airport has one runway: runway 18/36 is 3999 x 60 ft (1219 x 18 m) and made of asphalt.

For the 12-month period ending April 30, 2021, the airport averaged 22 aircraft operations per day, or about 8,000 per year, consisting entirely of general aviation operations. For the same time period, there were 17 aircraft on the field, all single-engine airplanes.

The airport is served by an fixed-base operator called Sparta Aero Services. It offers fuel, aircraft hangars and parking, a conference room, and pilot lounges.

== Accidents and incidents ==
- On January 14, 1998, a Beechcraft 95-55 Baron while flying an RNAV GPS approach to the Pinckneyville-Du Quoin Airport. The probable cause of the accident was found to be the pilot's descent below minimum descent altitude and his intentional operation with known deficiencies in equipment.
- On July 14, 2003, a Cessna 172 Skyhawk operated by Southern Illinois University as an instructional airplane was substantially damaged during final approach to the Pinckneyville-Du Quoin Airport. The airplane struck a runway threshold light at the approach end of the runway. According to the flight instructor onboard, the private pilot was practicing short field landings, soft field landings, and slips during the flight. While performing a slip to landing, the student's approach became low. The instructor attempted to add power, but the airplane could not recover and impacted a threshold light on the runway. The probable cause of the accident was found to be the pilot receiving instruction's failure to maintain the planned approach and the flight instructor's delayed remedial action.
- On February 10, 2007, a Cessna 172 Skyhawk struck a deer while landing at the Pinckneyville-Du Quoin Airport. The probable cause of the accident was found to be the presence of a deer on the runway, resulting in an inadvertent collision during the landing roll.

== See also ==
- List of airports in Illinois
- South Central Transit
