= Olney-Noble Airport =

Public use airport in Richland County, Illinois

Coordinates: 38°43′19″N 088°10′26″W

- IATA: OLY; ICAO: KOLY; FAA LID: OLY

Summary
- Owner: Olney-Noble Airport Authority
- Time zone: UTC−06:00 (-6)
  - Summer (DST): UTC−05:00 (-5)
- Elevation AMSL: 482 ft / 147 m
- Interactive map of Olney-Noble Airport

Runways
Direction	Length		Surface
Direction	ft	m	Surface
11/29	4,099	1,249

Statistics (2020)
- Aircraft Movements: 6,000

Olney-Noble Airport is a public-use airport located between Olney and Noble, Illinois, United States. It is publicly owned by the Olney-Noble Airport Authority.

In 2023, solar panels were installed at the airport to provide power to nearby residents.

== Facilities and aircraft ==
The airport has two asphalt runways. Runway 11/29 measures 4099 x 75 ft (1249 x 23 m); runway 4/22 measures 3598 x 60 ft (1097 x 18 m).

The fixed-base operator on the airport, TDB Aviation, offers services such as parking, aircraft rental, aircraft maintenance, flight instruction, courtesy cars, and fueling.

For the 12-month period ending March 31, 2020, the airport averaged 115 aircraft operations per week, or roughly 6,000 per year. This was 88% general aviation and 12% air taxi. For the same time period, there were 18 aircraft based on the field: 16 single-engine airplanes, 1 helicopter, and 1 glider.

== Accidents and incidents ==
- On May 9, 1995, a Beech BE60 Duke impacted the ground during an instrument approach to Olney-Noble Airport. The probable cause of the accident was found to be the pilot's improper IFR procedures by descending below the minimum descent altitude and not executing the published missed approach procedures.

== See also ==
- List of airports in Illinois
