= Metropolis Municipal Airport =

- IATA: none; ICAO: none; FAA LID: M30

Summary
- Airport type: Public
- Owner: City of Metropolis
- Location: Metropolis, Illinois
- Time zone: UTC−06:00 (-6)
  - Summer (DST): UTC−05:00 (-5)
- Elevation AMSL: 384 ft / 117 m
- Coordinates: 37°11′09″N 088°45′02″W

Map
- Location of airport in Illinois M30 (the United States)

Runways
| Direction | Length | | Surface |
| Direction | ft | m | Surface |
|---|---|---|---|
| 18/36 | 4,000 | 1,219 | Asphalt |

Metropolis Municipal Airport (FAA LID: M30) is an airstrip two miles (3.2 km) northwest of Metropolis, Illinois, United States.

== History ==
The airport was dedicated in 1947 as part of Metropolis's post-WWII development plan. The airport originally had a 2800-foot blacktop runway and a 3300-foot turf runway.

For 18 years ending in 2006, the airport hosted a competition for remote-controlled model jets, which attracted as many as 200 participants.

The airport received $25,000 as part of the Rebuild Illinois program during the COVID-19 pandemic. The money went toward a $500,000 fund to upgrade the airport's T-hangars. Additional funds for the hangars and to upgrade airport lighting and cables were received from the federal government with a small fraction coming from local funds.

== Facilities and aircraft ==
The airport has one runway: runway 18/36 is 4002 x 75 ft (1220 x 23 m). For the 12-month period ending April 30, 2020, the airport averages 36 aircraft operations per day, which roughly totals 13,140 per year. These operations are 82% general aviation and 8% air taxi. The airport ranks 14th of 323 airports in Illinois.

As of 2022, there are 14 aircraft based at the airport: 12 single engine and 2 multi engine airplanes.

The airport has an fixed-base operator offering fuel, hangars, a conference room, a crew lounge, snooze rooms, and more.

== Accidents and incidents ==
- On August 30, 1991, a Hocker Dragonfly stalled near the airport due to the pilot's inability to maintain appropriate speed.
- On June 7, 2008, an amateur-built Kindig Sonex experienced a partial loss of power on departure from Metropolis. The pilot began to return to the airport, and the engine failed in the downwind back to the departure airport. The engine completely failed on the way back to the runway, and the aircraft touched down short of the runway, subsequently impacting runway lights as it rolled onto the runway surface, damaging the right wing ribs.
- On May 10, 2009, a Rockwell International 112A Commander was substantially damaged after an engine failure in flight near Metropolis. The pilot received significant injuries, and their passengers received minor injuries. The cause of the power loss could not be determined.
- On June 22, 2012, a Piper PA-46 experienced a landing gear collapse at Metropolis. The pilot, who was uninjured, reported they lowered the landing gear and noted three green annunciator lights. The nose gear collapsed after touchdown, the airplane drifted left, and the main gear collapsed one at a time. The cause of the gear collapse could not be found because testing could not replicate the problem.

== See also ==
- List of airports in Illinois
