= Cushing Field =

Public Airport in Newark, IL

Coordinates: 41°31′10″N 088°36′18″W

Cushing Field Airport
- IATA: none; ICAO: none; FAA LID: 0C8

Summary
- Serves: Newark, Illinois
- Time zone: UTC−06:00 (-6)
  - Summer (DST): UTC−05:00 (-5)
- Elevation AMSL: 640 ft / 195 m
- Interactive map of Cushing Field Airport

Runways
Direction	Length		Surface
Direction	ft	m	Surface
18/36	2,831	863	Turf

Statistics (2021)
- Aircraft Movements: 12,000

Cushing Field (FAA LID: 0C8) is a privately owned, public use airport located 2 miles southwest of Newark, Illinois, United States. In 2019, the airport received the Illinois Airport of the Year Award in the "Privately Owned/Public Use" category.

== Facilities ==
The airport has one runway, a turf surface measuring 2831 x 180 ft (863 x 55 m).

The airport has an FBO offering a lounge, snooze rooms, snacks, and a courtesy car. No fuel is offered at the airport, but it does offer aircraft rental, flight training, and aircraft maintenance.

== Aircraft ==
For the 12-month period ending July 31, 2021, the airport averaged 33 aircraft operations per day, or 12,000 per year. This was entirely general aviation. For that same time period, there were 66 aircraft based on the field: 50 ultralights and 16 airplanes, of which 15 were single-engine and 1 was multi-engine.

== Accidents & incidents ==
- On May 27, 2007, a Purvis Rans S6S crashed while attempting a takeoff from Cushing Field. Witnesses said the pilot pulled the aircraft into a 90-degree nose-up attitude, then drifted to the left and stalled. No obvious attempt to recover from the stall was made. The probable cause was found to be the pilot's failure to maintain control of the airplane, resulting in inadequate airspeed and a stall. A contributing factor was found to be an improper installation of the altimeter and airspeed indicator, rendering the two inoperative, as well as the pilot's inexperience in the airplane, in which he had 1.5 hours.
- On July 21, 2008, a CZAW SportCruiser crashed while in the traffic pattern at Cushing Airport near where the pilot would make a downwind to base turn. The aircraft impacted terrain in a 30-degree nose-down attitude in a left bank. No preexisting anomalies were found in the airframe. The sole pilot on board received fatal injuries, partly because one of the shoulder harnesses had failed.
- On July 9, 2016, an Evolution Trikes Revo crashed while attempting to land at Cushing Field. The aircraft was piloted by a student pilot on his fourth solo flight in weight-shift aircraft. Witnesses reported that the aircraft oscillated from left to right on the runway after landing until the aircraft flipped over onto its side. No anomalies or malfunctions were found with the aircraft, and the probable cause of the crash was found to be the pilot's failure to maintain direction control on landing. The pilot received fatal injuries.

== See also ==
- List of airports in Illinois
