= Mount Sterling Municipal Airport =

Coordinates: 39°59′09″N 090°48′15″W

- IATA: none; ICAO: none; FAA LID: I63

Summary
- Serves: Mount Sterling, Illinois
- Location: Brown County, Illinois
- Time zone: UTC−06:00 (-6)
  - Summer (DST): UTC−05:00 (-5)
- Elevation AMSL: 734 ft / 224 m
- Interactive map of Mount Sterling Municipal Airport

Runways
Direction	Length		Surface
Direction	ft	m	Surface
18/36	5,905	1,800	Asphalt

Statistics (2020)
- Aircraft Movements: 3000

Mount Sterling Municipal Airport (FAA LID: I63) is a public use airport located 2 miles west of Mount Sterling, Illinois. The airport is publicly owned.

The airport sees traffic from Dot Foods and its vendors as well as seasonal hunters, crop dusters, and medevac aircraft.

== Facilities and aircraft ==
=== Facilities ===
The airport has one runway: runway 18/36 is 5905 x 75 ft (1800 x 23 m) and is asphalt.

Self-serve fuel is available at the airport from Dot Foods. The airport is not regularly attended.

The airport received $1.5 million from the State of Illinois as part of its Rebuild Illinois program during the COVID-19 pandemic to expand a taxiway. The airport hoped that an expanded taxiway would allow aircraft to stay off the runway longer, especially by allowing them to taxi to the runway's end without needing to turn around on the runway. preventing runway incursions that might otherwise happen with short or confusing taxiways. The airport also hopes to expand hangar space in the coming years.

=== Aircraft ===
For the 12-month period ending March 31, 2020, the airport had an average of 57 aircraft operations per week, or roughly 3,000 per year. The traffic is 100% of general aviation. For the same time period, there are 10 aircraft based on the field: 9 single-engine and 1 jet.

== Accidents and incidents ==
- On October 4, 2017, a single-engine Rix Rocket airplane made an emergency landing on IL-99 near the Mount Sterling Municipal Airport.

== See also ==
- List of airports in Illinois
