= Hinckley Airport =

- IATA: none; ICAO: none; FAA LID: 0C2

Summary
- Airport type: Public
- Owner: Partners Investment Cap Inc.
- Serves: Hinckley, Illinois
- Time zone: UTC−06:00 (-6)
  - Summer (DST): UTC−05:00 (-5)
- Elevation AMSL: 760 ft (230 m)
- Coordinates: 41°46′15″N 088°42′12″W
- Interactive map of Hinckley Airport

Runways
Direction	Length		Surface
Direction	ft	m	Surface
9/27	2,640	805	Turf

Statistics (2019)
- Aircraft operations: 48,000
- Based aircraft: 35
- Source: Federal Aviation Administration

Hinckley Airport (FAA LID: 0C2) is a privately owned, public-use airport located three nautical miles (6 km) west of the central business district of Hinckley, a village in DeKalb County, Illinois, United States.

== Facilities and aircraft ==
Hinckley Airport covers an area of 22 acres (8.9 ha) at an elevation of 760 feet (232 m) above mean sea level. It has one runway designated 9/27 with a 2,640 by 100 ft (805 x 30 m) turf surface.

For the 12-month period ending August 31, 2019, the airport had 48,000 aircraft operations, an average of 131 per day, all of which were general aviation. At that time there were 35 aircraft based at this airport: 25 gliders and 10 airplanes, 9 single-engine and 1 multi-engine.

The airport does not have an FBO, and no fuel is available.

== Accidents & Incidents ==
- On September 7, 1992, a Beechcraft 18 operating a skydiving flight crashed after taking off from Hinckley Airport. Witnesses reported seeing the plane flying low after takeoff and "floating as if it was without power." The plane soon flipped over and crashed. All 12 onboard died.

== See also ==
- List of airports in Illinois
