= Macomb Municipal Airport =

- IATA: MQB; ICAO: KMQB; FAA LID: MQB

Summary
- Airport type: Public
- Owner: Macomb Airport Authority
- Location: Macomb, Illinois
- Time zone: UTC−06:00 (-6)
  - Summer (DST): UTC−05:00 (-5)
- Elevation AMSL: 706 ft / 215 m
- Coordinates: 40°31′11.0″N 090°39′21.9″W

Map
- Location of airport in Illinois MQB (the United States)

Runways
Direction	Length		Surface
Direction	ft	m	Surface
9/27	5,100	1,554	Asphalt
18/36	3,719	1,134	Turf

Statistics (2021)
- Aircraft operations: 9,000
- Based aircraft: 23
- Source: Federal Aviation Administration

Macomb Municipal Airport (IATA: MQB, ICAO: KMQB, FAA LID: MQB) is a public airport located three statute miles (5 km) north of the central business district of Macomb, a city in McDonough County, Illinois, United States. It is owned by the Macomb Airport Authority.

In 2017, the airport was named an Illinois Airport of the Year in the "General Aviation-Runway greater than 5,000 feet" category.

== Facilities and aircraft ==
Macomb Municipal Airport covers an area of 360 acres (150 ha) which contains two runways: 9/27 with an asphalt pavement measuring 5,100 by 100 ft (1,554 by 30 m) and 18/36 with a turf surface measuring 3,719 by 190 ft (1,134 by 58 m).

The airport has a fixed base operator that sells fuel. Available services include aircraft parking, general maintenance, hangars, and courtesy transportation. Amenities include internet, conference rooms, pilot supplies, a crew lounge, snooze rooms, and more.

For the 12-month period ending May 31, 2021, the airport had 9,000 aircraft operations, an average of 25 per day: 72% general aviation and 28% air taxi. There was 23 aircraft based at this airport: 21 single-engine and 2 multi-engine.

== See also ==
- List of airports in Illinois
- Macomb station
