= Salem–Leckrone Airport =

- IATA: SLO; ICAO: KSLO; FAA LID: SLO; WMO: 72433

Summary
- Airport type: Public
- Owner: Salem Airport Authority
- Serves: Salem, Illinois
- Time zone: UTC−06:00 (-6)
  - Summer (DST): UTC−05:00 (-5)
- Elevation AMSL: 573 ft (175 m)
- Coordinates: 38°38′34″N 088°57′51″W

Map
- Location of airport in Illinois SLO (the United States)

Runways
Direction	Length		Surface
Direction	ft	m	Surface
18/36	4,098	1,249	Asphalt

Statistics (2020)
- Aircraft operations: 19,000
- Based aircraft: 8
- Source: Federal Aviation Administration

Salem–Leckrone Airport (IATA: SLO, ICAO: KSLO, FAA LID: SLO) is a public use airport located two nautical miles (4 km) northwest of the central business district of Salem, a city in Marion County, Illinois, United States. It is owned by the Salem Airport Authority. This airport is included in the National Plan of Integrated Airport Systems for 2011–2015, which categorized it as a general aviation facility.

The airport is named for Phillip Leckrone, a flying instructor from Salem who fought in the Royal Air Force Eagle Squadrons during World War II.

== Facilities and aircraft ==
Salem–Leckrone Airport covers an area of 364 acres (147 ha) at an elevation of 573 feet (175 m) above mean sea level. It has one runway designated 18/36 with an asphalt surface measuring 4,098 by 75 feet (1,249 x 23 m).

The airport has a fixed-base operator offering fuel as well as a lounge, restrooms, a courtesy car, and pilot supplies.

For the 12-month period ending March 31, 2020, the airport had 19,000 aircraft operations, an average of 52 per day: 95% general aviation and 5% air taxi. At that time there were 10 aircraft based at this airport, all single-engine airplanes.

== Accidents and incidents ==
- On October 30, 2001, a Cessna 210M sustained substantial damage during a wheels-up landing at the Salem-Leckrone Airport. In his written statement, the pilot said that while approaching to land he was unable to lower the landing gear. He said that he attempted to lower the landing gear using the emergency extension system and that he could smell hydraulic fluid. A postaccident examination of the airplane revealed that a hydraulic hose on the nose gear door actuator had failed and allowed hydraulic fluid to leak from the gear retraction system. The probable cause of the accident was found to be the ruptured hydraulic hose.

== See also ==
- List of airports in Illinois
- South Central Transit
