= Monmouth Municipal Airport =

Coordinates: 40°55′45″N 090°37′53″W

- IATA: none; ICAO: none

Summary
- Operator: City of Monmouth, Illinois
- Serves: Monmouth, Illinois
- Opened: 1922
- Built: 1921
- Time zone: UTC−06:00 (-6)
  - Summer (DST): UTC−05:00 (-5)
- Elevation AMSL: 753 ft / 230 m
- Interactive map of Monmouth Municipal Airport

Runways
Direction	Length		Surface
Direction	ft	m	Surface
3/21	2,899	884	Asphalt

Statistics (2022)
- Based Aircraft: 5,000

Monmouth Municipal Airport (FAA LID: C66) is a civil, public use airport located two miles north of Monmouth, Illinois. The airport is publicly owned by the City of Monmouth.

The airport hosts an annual fly-in breakfast on the 4th of July, which began in the 1980s.

== History ==
The airport was founded in 1921 by a group known as the Aero Club. The Club raised money both from the community and the Curtiss-Iowa Aircraft Corporation. It is the oldest continuously operating airport in Illinois.

In 2019, a fire destroyed the airport's main hangar, destroying not only the hangar but also administrative building, airport documents, and eight of the ten aircraft stored there. The airport's plans for a new hangar was approved in 2021. The new hangar was completed in 2022 and opened for use in July of that year.

== Facilities and aircraft ==
The airport has one runway: runway 3/21 is 2899 x 60 ft (884 x 18 m) and made of asphalt.

The airport operates its own fixed-base operator, offering fuel; parking and hangars; and a courtesy car. Local pilots can take advantage of flight training and aircraft rental. Aerial photography services are also available.

In 2023, the airport began a project to upgrade its parking apron; to extend a water line out to a fire hydrant; and to put in a new entrance road and car parking lot.

In the 12-month period ending July 31, 2019, 2022 airport had 96 airport operations per week, or about 5000 per year. These are 96% general aviation and 4% air taxi. For the same time period, the airport had 11 based aircraft, all of which were single-engine airplanes.

== Accidents and incidents ==
- On August 25, 2011, a single-engine airplane flipped over while landing at the Monmouth Municipal Airport. The pilot reported he hit the brakes too hard, causing the aircraft to flip over.

== See also ==
- List of airports in Illinois
