= Highland-Winet Airport =

Public-Use Airport in Highland, Illinois

Coordinates: 38°46′45″N 89°38′28″W

- IATA: none; ICAO: none; FAA LID: H07

Summary
- Owner/Operator: St. Louis Soaring Association
- Serves: Highland, Illinois
- Time zone: UTC−06:00 (-6)
  - Summer (DST): UTC−05:00 (-5)
- Elevation AMSL: 537 ft / 164 m
- Interactive map of Highland-Winet Airport

Runways
Direction	Length		Surface
Direction	ft	m	Surface
18/36	2,200	671	Turf

Statistics (2018)
- Aircraft Movements: 1,976

Highland-Winet Airport (FAA LID: H07) is a public-use airport located 3.5 miles northeast of Highland, Illinois. By the Pierron Y. The airport is privately owned by the St. Louis Soaring Association.

== Facilities and aircraft ==
The airport has one runway: runway 18/36, which measures 2,200 x 100 ft (671 x 30 m) and is made of turf. The airport does not have a fixed-base operator, and no fuel services are available.

For the 12-month period ending May 31, 2018, the airport recorded 38 aircraft operations per week, or just under 2,000 per year, all of which were general aviation. There are 25 aircraft based at the airport, including 19 gliders and 6 single-engine airplanes.

== Accidents and incidents ==
- On September 10, 2003, a Burkhart Grob G102 Club Astir IIIB impacted terrain during an off-airport landing near Highland-Winet Airport. The glider was released from a tow plane at 3,000 feet, and the pilot reported that the thermals he tried to fly in were weak, preventing the aircraft from maintaining altitude. While attempting to return to Highland-Winet Airport (H07), the glider encountered a strong downdraft, which made it impossible to reach the airport.

== See also ==
- List of airports in Illinois
