= Casey Municipal Airport =

Civil airport in Casey, Illinois

Coordinates: 39°18′08″N 088°00′12″W

Casey Municipal Airport is a civil public-use general aviation airport located 1 mile northwest of Casey, Illinois, United States. Though the airport is owned by the City of Casey, the city leases the airport to Casey Airport Boosters, Inc., an organization that manages the airport.

The airport has two runways. Runway 4/22 is 4001 x 75 ft (1220 x 23 meters) and is made of asphalt. Runway 18/36 is 1943 x 75 ft (592 x 23 meters) and is turf.

As of August 2019, there were 11 aircraft based at the airport: 9 single-engine, 1 multi-engine, and 1 jet. For the 12-month period ending August 31, 2019, the airport averaged 22 aircraft movements per day: 96% general aviation, 2% air taxi, and <1% military.

== See also ==
- List of airports in Illinois
