= Vandalia Municipal Airport =

Airport in Vandalia, IL, US

- IATA: VLA; ICAO: KVLA; FAA LID: VLA

Summary
- Owner/Operator: Vandalia Park District
- Serves: Vandalia, Illinois
- Time zone: UTC−06:00 (-6)
  - Summer (DST): UTC−05:00 (-5)
- Elevation AMSL: 537 ft / 164 m
- Coordinates: 38°59′28″N 89°10′02″W
- Interactive map of Vandalia Municipal Airport

Runways
Direction	Length		Surface
Direction	ft	m	Surface
18/36	3,751	1,143	Asphalt

Statistics (2020)
- Aircraft Movements: 9,125

Vandalia Municipal Airport (IATA: VLA, ICAO: KVLA, FAA: VLA) is a civil, public use airport located 3 miles northwest of Vandalia, Illinois. The airport is publicly owned by the Vandalia Park District, which also manages the fixed-base operator (FBO) on the field.

== Facilities and aircraft ==
The airport has two asphalt runways. Runway 18/35 is 3751 x 100 ft (1143 x 30 m), and runway 9/27 is 3001 x 75 ft (915 x 23 m).

The airport has a number of hangars and storage facilities for its based aircraft. In 2019, a tornado destroyed some of these facilities and the aircraft stored inside them.

The fixed-base operator at the airport offers services including self-serve fuel, a pilots lounge, and a courtesy car.

In 2021, the Illinois Department of Transportation awarded Vandalia Airport $300,000 for pavement maintenance as part of its Airport Improvement Program.

For the 12-month period ending March 31, 2020, the airport has 25 aircraft operations per day, or about 9,000 per year. This is 99% general aviation and <1% air taxi. For the same time period, there are 13 aircraft based on the field: 12 single-engine and 1 multi-engine airplane.

== Accidents and incidents ==
- On May 21, 2005, a Cessna R182 collided with the terrain following a loss of control while taking off from Vandalia Municipal Airport. A witness reported watching the airplane takeoff on runway 36. She stated that approximately 20 seconds after taking off, the airplane entered a 90-degree left bank and disappeared below the tree line. During post-accident investigation, an FAA inspector reported that flight control continuity was established from the cockpit controls to all flight control surfaces, and the landing gear and flaps were retracted. The propeller blades exhibited "S" bending and chordwise scratching, and engine continuity was established. No airframe or engine failures/malfunctions were found which would have resulted in the accident. The reason for the pilot's failure to maintain control of the aircraft could not be determined.

== See also ==
- List of airports in Illinois
