= Percival Springs Airport =

Public Airport in Watson, Illinois

Coordinates: 39°0′52″N 88°32′21″W

- IATA: none; ICAO: none; FAA LID: 2T2

Summary
- Location: Watson, Illinois
- Time zone: UTC−06:00 (-6)
  - Summer (DST): UTC−05:00 (-5)
- Elevation AMSL: 552 ft / 168 m
- Interactive map of Percival Springs Airport

Runways
Direction	Length		Surface
Direction	ft	m	Surface
18/36	2,000	610	Turf

Statistics (2020)
- Aircraft Movements: 1,100

Percival Springs Airport (FAA LID: 2T2) is a public-use airport located one-mile (1.6 km) southeast of Watson, Illinois, United States. It is privately owned.

Camping is a major attraction at the airport. The facility includes RV parking spaces and places for tent camping. In total, there are 24 camping spaces located at the airport for temporary and long-term camping. Adjacent showers and restrooms also support the facility.

== Facilities and aircraft ==
The airport has one runway. Runway 18/36 measures 2,000 ft × 100 ft (610 m × 30 m) and is made of turf. It has a 300-foot (91 m) stopway at the north end. The airport has no FBO.

For the 12-month period ending March 31, 2020, the airport had 1100 per year, or 21 per week. This traffic was 91% air taxi and 9% general aviation. For that same time period, one aircraft, a helicopter, was based at the airport.

== See also ==
- List of airports in Illinois
