= Effingham County Memorial Airport =

Public Airport in Effingham, Illinois

Coordinates: 39°04′14″N 088°32′01″W

- IATA: none; ICAO: none; FAA LID: 1H2

Summary
- Airport type: Public
- Owner: Effingham County Board
- Location: Effingham, Illinois
- Elevation AMSL: 587 ft (179 m)
- Website: co.effingham.il.us/airport

Map

Runways
Direction	Length		Surface
Direction	ft	m	Surface
11/29	5,100	1,554	Concrete
1/19	3,400	1,036	Asphalt

Statistics (2007)
- Aircraft operations: 25,000
- Source: Federal Aviation Administration

Effingham County Memorial Airport (FAA LID: 1H2) is a public airport located three miles (5 km) south of the central business district of Effingham, a city in Effingham County, Illinois, United States. It is owned by the Effingham County Board.

The Experimental Aircraft Association has a presence at the airport and has offered local residents a variety of perks, including a recent program to offer children free flights.

== Facilities and aircraft ==
Effingham County Memorial Airport covers an area of 651 acres (263 ha) which contains two runways: 11/29 with a 5,103 x 75 ft (1,555 x 23 m) concrete pavement and 1/19 with a 3,400 x 60 ft (1,036 x 18 m) asphalt surface.

The airport has an FBO offering fuel and airframe and powerplant maintenance services. A lounge, restrooms, refreshments, and courtesy cars are also available.

The airport has seen significant plans for expansion throughout 2022. It has a significant number of hangars for aircraft owners. Multiple new facilities were funded and constructed during 2022, most notably a new 112 x 100 foot hangar for private jets as well as a bay of t-hangars that could fit up to 10 aircraft. Plans to extend Runway 29 and its parallel taxiways by 900 feet are also underway, and plans to move the streets around the airport to accommodate are being considered.

For the 12-month period ending August 31, 2019, the airport had 25,000 aircraft operations, an average of 68 per day: 80% general aviation, 20% air taxi and <1% military. For the same time period, there are 12 aircraft based on the field: 16 single engine airplanes, 1 multi engine airplane, and 1 jet.

The Effingham County Airport is managed and operated by Jerry Tate.

== See also ==
- List of airports in Illinois
- Effingham station
