= Zelmer Memorial Airpark =

Public Use Airport in Palmyra, Illinois

Coordinates: 39°25′12″N 89°59′28″W

- IATA: none; ICAO: none; FAA LID: 5K1

Summary
- Owner/Operator: Zelmer Memorial Airpark Inc
- Time zone: UTC−06:00 (-6)
  - Summer (DST): UTC−05:00 (-5)
- Elevation AMSL: 663 ft / 202 m
- Interactive map of Zelmer Memorial Airpark

Runways
Direction	Length		Surface
Direction	ft	m	Surface
18/36	2,900	884	Asphalt

Statistics (2020)
- Aircraft Movements: 5,000

Zelmer Memorial Airpark (FAA LID: 5K1)is a privately owned public use airport located 1 mile south of Palmyra, Illinois, United States.

== Facilities and aircraft ==
The airport covers 27 acres of land. It has one runway measuring 2900 x 32 ft (884 x 10 m). It is made of asphalt.

There is no fixed-base operator operating at the airport. However, there is a flying club that offers aircraft rental. Fuel is also available at the airport.

For the 12-month period ending March 31, 2020, the airport had 96 aircraft operations per week, or about 5,000 per year. This was 98% general aviation and 2% air taxi. For the same time period, there were 17 aircraft based on the field: 16 single-engine airplanes and 1 ultralight.

== Accidents and incidents ==
- On September 25, 1994, an experimental Thomas E. Georges Z-Max crashed after takeoff from Zelmer. The pilot reported that the engine lost power as he was climbing through 150 feet. As he attempted to pick a landing site, the airplane stalled and impacted terrain. The probable cause was found to be an inadvertent stall while maneuvering to land. Contributing factors include loss of engine power due to carburetor ice and the unavailability of a carburetor heating system in the aircraft. The sole pilot on board sustained serious injuries.
- On May 2, 2020, a Yakovlev Yak-52 crashed at the airport after performing a low pass above the runway and pitching up for a steep climb, at which point the aircraft entered a roll and pitched straight down. The probable cause of the crash was found to be loss of control during a low-altitude aerobatic maneuver. The sole pilot on board died.
- On May 31, 2020, a Piper Cherokee crashed near the airport, killing all four on board.

== See also ==
- List of airports in Illinois
