= Pittsfield Penstone Municipal Airport =

Public use airport in Pittsfield, Illinois

Coordinates: 39°38′21″N 090°46′44″W

- IATA: none; ICAO: KPPQ; FAA LID: PPQ

Summary
- Owner/Operator: City of Pittsfield, Illinois
- Serves: Pittsfield, Illinois
- Location: Pike County, Illinois
- Time zone: UTC−06:00 (-6)
  - Summer (DST): UTC−05:00 (-5)
- Elevation AMSL: 710 ft / 216 m
- Interactive map of Pittsfield Penstone Municipal Airport

Runways
Direction	Length		Surface
Direction	ft	m	Surface
13/31	4,000	1,219	Asphalt

Statistics (2021)
- Aircraft Movements: 7,000

Pittsfield Penstone Municipal Airport (ICAO: KPPQ, FAA: PPQ) is a public-use civil airport in Pittsfield, Pike County, Illinois, United States. It is owned by the City of Pittsfield and is located between the Mississippi and Illinois Rivers. The airport is classified as a general aviation facility by the Federal Aviation Administration.

Wildlife has been known to live on and around the airport, and trophy hunting has proved a major use of the airport.

== Facilities and aircraft ==
The airport has one runway: runway 13/31 is 4000 feet x 60 feet and is made of asphalt. The airport is at an elevation of 710 feet and covers 300 acres.

For the yearlong period ending April 30, 2021, the airport had 134 aircraft operations per week, totaling nearly 7,000 per year: 96% general aviation, 3% air taxi, and 1% military. The airport has no major commercial service. In this time period, there were 10 aircraft based on the field: 7 single-engine and 2 multi-engine airplanes as well as 1 jet.

== See also ==
- List of airports in Illinois
