= Schaumburg Regional Airport =

Airport in Schaumburg, IL, US

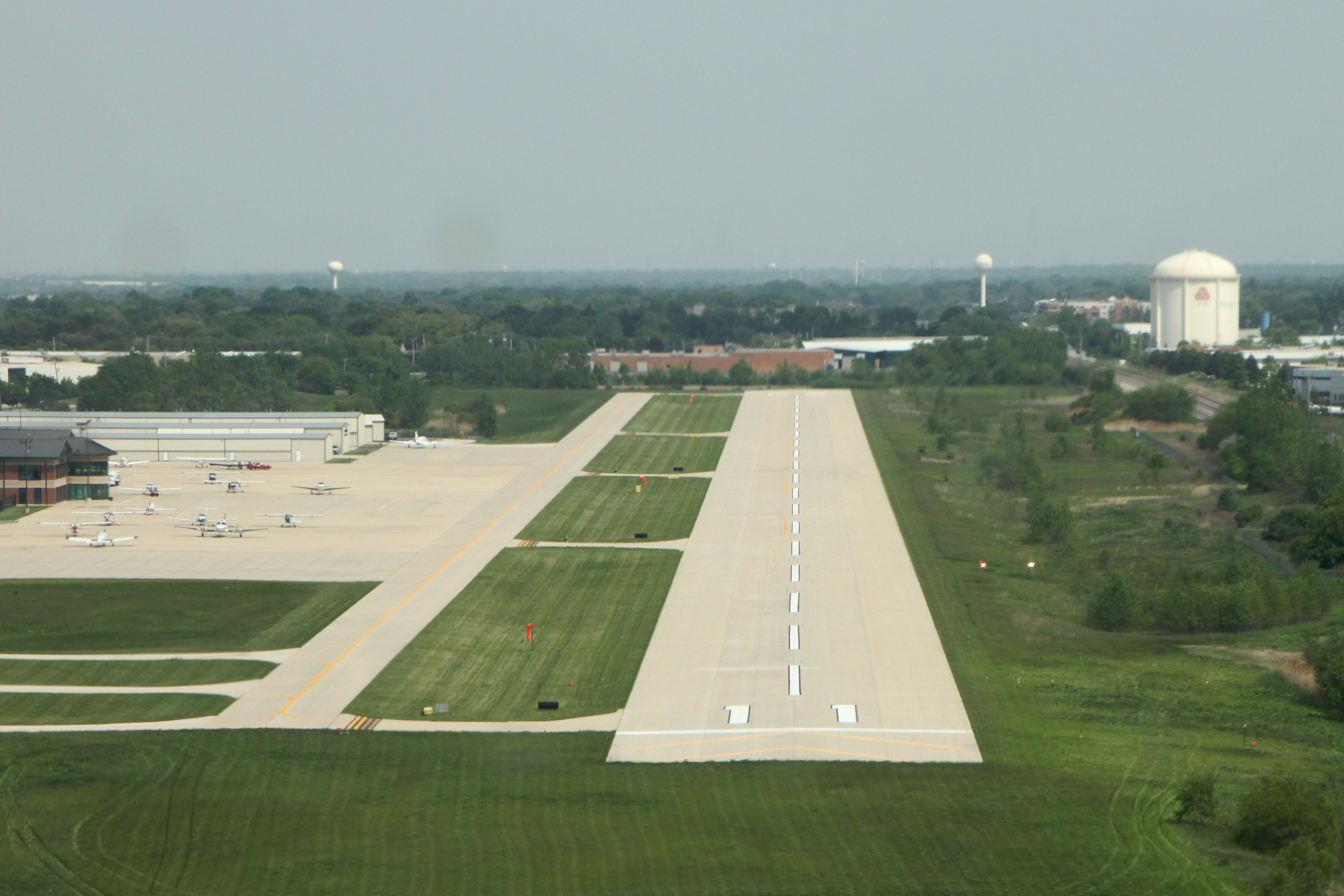
- IATA: none; ICAO: none; FAA LID: 06C

Summary
- Airport type: Public
- Owner: Village of Schaumburg
- Serves: Chicago
- Location: Schaumburg, Illinois
- Opened: 1959; 67 years ago
- Time zone: UTC−06:00 (-6)
  - Summer (DST): UTC−05:00 (-5)
- Elevation AMSL: 801 ft / 244 m
- Coordinates: 41°59′22″N 088°06′04″W
- Website: https://www.villageofschaumburg.com/government/transportation/schaumburg-regional-airport

Map
- Location of airport in Illinois 06C (the United States)

Runways
Direction	Length		Surface
Direction	ft	m	Surface
11/29	3,800	1,158	Concrete

Statistics
- Aircraft operations (2019): 45,000
- Based aircraft (2021): 66
- Source: Federal Aviation Administration

Schaumburg Regional Airport (FAA LID: 06C) is a public use airport located 22 nautical miles (41 km; 25 mi) northwest of Chicago in the village of Schaumburg in Cook and DuPage counties, Illinois, United States. The airport is owned by the Village of Schaumburg and is just south of the Schaumburg Municipal Helistop.

== History ==
=== Beginning ===
A 1945 navy map of Glenview Naval Air Station and its 15 satellite airfields depicts an L-shaped landing field in Schaumburg with a designation of "SC". In 1946, there were numerous Navy landing fields, but Schaumburg was described as being located at the southeast corner of Schaumburg Road and Barrington Road.

Roselle Airfield

Purchase of land for Roselle Field was started in 1959 in an then-unincorporated area of Cook and DuPage counties. An article dated February 25, 1960 in the Roselle Register mentions that Leonard Boeske would start building the airport by March 25, 1960. An April 13, 1961 Roselle Register article reads, "work on the airport is 80 percent complete..." and continues "landscaping and sodding will be finished by June 1."

On May 25, 1961, Illinois Safety inspector Dan Smith landed at Roselle Field and certified the showpiece airfield safe for operation. The official opening was delayed until about mid-July. Between June 26, 1961, and May 27, 1963, there were at least five meetings to get Roselle Field annexed into the Village of Roselle.

In 1963, there were two FBOs at Roselle Airfield: Ace Aviation in the old flight office and B&M aircraft/Roselle Beechcraft in the big hangar. Ace Aviation was owned by Wilbur (Pip) Snyder, who owned an Ace Hardware in Roselle Illinois and was a Piper dealer. Internal to Ace Aviation was Cliff Hutton, the airport manager. Roselle Beechcraft was owned by Harold (Hal) MaGee (who represented the "M" in B&M, while the "B" was Brunke, who had died) and Richard (Dick) C. Leach. The restaurant on top was owned by a postman named Chris Heidt.

Schaumburg Airport

In December 1963, the Village of Schaumburg annexed Roselle Airport. From 1964 to 1965, the flight schools together had 5 Piper Colts; 5 Beechcraft Bonanzas, including 2 Debonairs and 1 each of the F, P, and S Model Bonanzas; 4 or 5 Beech Muskateers; 3 Cessna Skyhawks; 3 Comanche 250s; 2 Piper Cherokees; 1 Piper Twin Comanche; 1 Comanche 400; 1 Cessna 310; 1 Beech Travel Air; and 1 235 Apache. A Chicago sectional chart dated December 10, 1964 depicts Roselle Airfield west of O’Hare and Northwest of Mitchell Airport.

In 1965, the terminal building on the north side of the apron was built. It was made of brick exterior bearing walls with metal framing in the roof and has a concrete floor. Heat was generated from hot water tubing encased in the concrete floor.

In the mid-1960s, there was an attempt to get private financing to resurface the runway. At the time, the paved runway (10/28) was 2600' by 46', but there was a N/E-S/W turf runway on the west side which started at old Irving Park road and ended before the C&NW Railroad tracks aligned with the taxiway. The turf runway was 1200' to 1400' long.

Around the same time, the airport was hit by two tornadoes. There was massive loss of aircraft. Wreckage was scattered for miles to the south and east after both storms. Additionally, there was extensive building and vehicle damage. Some owners lost two aircraft in one summer.

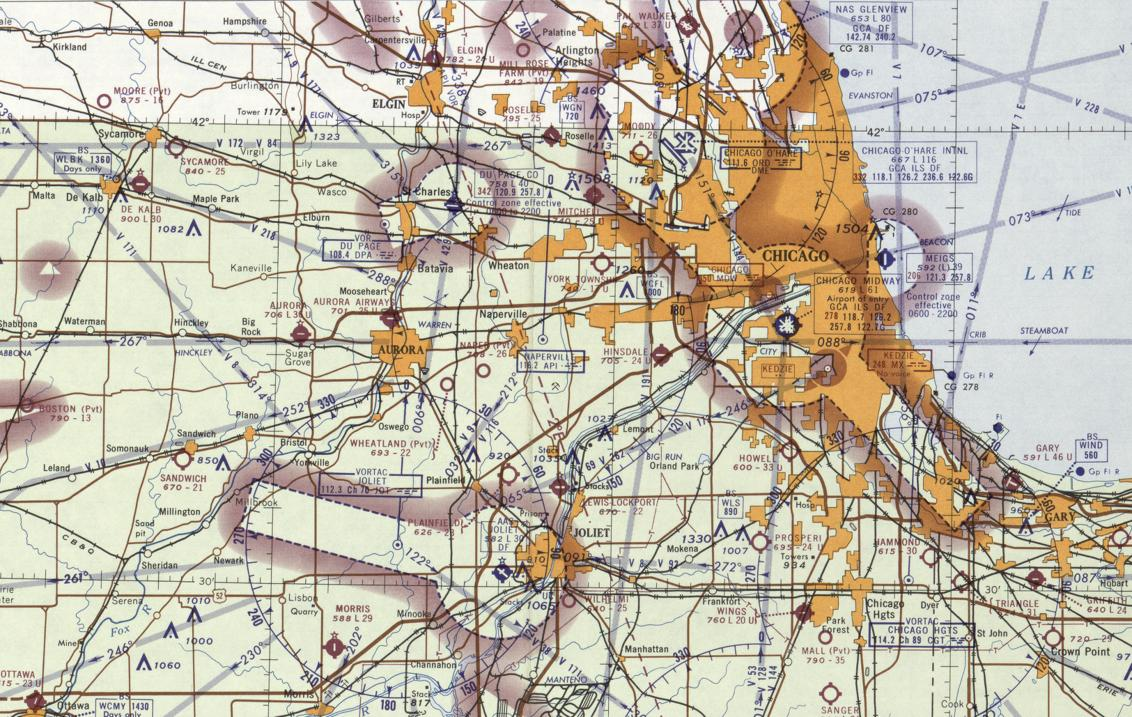
Roselle Field first appeared on the Chicago Sectional Aeronautical Chart with a field elevation of 795 feet above mean sea level (MSL) and a runway length of 2,500 feet.

=== 1960 to 1985 ===
The earliest map depicting Roselle Field was the May 30, 1963 Chicago Sectional Chart. According to the Illinois Airport Directory, the manager was Richard Leach, and there was Beechcraft sales/service on the field. Roselle Field was annexed into the Village of Schaumburg. The runway was 2,500 feet (760 m) long and 50 feet (15 m) wide at the time. In 1965, the runway was extended to 3,100 feet (940 m).

On February 6, 1970, President Richard M. Nixon flew to Roselle Field to dedicate a water treatment plant at the corner of Barrington and Irving Park Road in neighboring Hanover Park. In the early 1970s, the name was changed to Schaumburg Airpark. The fixed-base operator (FBO) changed to Northwest Flyers in 1985.

In 1970, the property was placed in a trust with the First National Bank of Chicago.

The number of takeoffs and landings estimated for 1974 was 64,934.

=== 1994 to 1999 ===
The Village of Schaumburg purchased the airport in 1994 to prevent it from being sold to developers. In 1995, the village replaced the 3,000×40-foot asphalt runway with a 3,800×100-foot concrete runway with a parallel taxiway and concrete tie-down areas for parking.

In 1998, construction of the 26,000 square foot terminal building was completed, including space for a quality restaurant, public meeting rooms, and space for businesses to operate in a facility that is both functional and architecturally impressive. 1999 saw the arrival of a new fuel farm for jet fuel (Jet-A) and aviation gasoline (100LL Avgas). A self-service station was installed for the 100LL.

=== 2000 to Present ===
New hangars, consisting of 33 units, were completed between 2000 and 2001, and a Precision Approach Path Indicator (PAPI) was installed. This is a system of lights that provide pilots vertical guidance to the runway, assisting them in determining whether they are too high, too low, or right on the glide path while attempting to land.

== Facilities and aircraft ==
Schaumburg Regional Airport covers an area of 120 acres (49 ha) at an elevation of 801 feet (244 m) above mean sea level. It has one runway designated 11/29 with a concrete surface measuring 3,800 by 100 feet (1,158 x 30 m).

There is one FBO, Holiday Airways, located at the airport.

123 aircraft were based at Schaumburg Airport as of September 1, 1974. Of these, 100 were owned by individuals that leased tiedown or hangar space from Schaumburg Airport, Inc. Lloyd's Flying owned 13 aircraft for the flight school; these were used primarily for instruction. Schaumburg Airport, Inc owned 10. All of the planes weighed under 8,000 pounds.

66 planes were based at the airport as of September 2021: 50 single engine and 4 multi engine airplanes, 9 helicopters, and 3 jets.

As of July 2019, the airport averaged 123 operations per day: 99% general aviation and 1% air taxi.

== Access ==
Metra service is provided approximately one mile west of the airport at Schaumburg station on the Milwaukee District West Line. Schaumburg Airport is on Illinois Route 19, approximately 0.5 miles east of the intersection of Irving Park Road and Rodenburg Road.

== Incidents and Accidents ==
- On September 11, 2024, a Piper Cherokee on a training flight was involved in an accident following a loss of engine power. The airplane impacted roadside obstacles 0.27 miles short of the threshold. Both occupants survived with minor injuries.

== See also ==
- List of airports in Illinois
