= Kewanee Municipal Airport =

Public use airport in Kewanee, Illinois

Coordinates: 41°12′14″N 089°57′44″W

- IATA: none; ICAO: KEZI; FAA LID: EZI

Summary
- Owner: Kewanee Airport Authority
- Serves: Kewanee, Illinois
- Time zone: UTC−06:00 (-6)
  - Summer (DST): UTC−05:00 (-6)
- Elevation AMSL: 858 ft (262 m)
- Interactive map of Kewanee Municipal Airport

Runways
Direction	Length		Surface
Direction	ft	m	Surface
9/27	4,500	1,372	Asphalt

Statistics (2020)
- Aircraft Phonetics: 12,000

Kewanee Municipal Airport (ICAO: KEZI, FAA LID: EZI) is a civil, public use airport located 3 miles southwest of Kewanee, Illinois, United States. The airport is publicly owned by the Kewanee Airport Authority.

The airport received the 2021 Illinois General Aviation Airport of the Year award. It was the airport's first time winning the award, which is awarded by the Illinois Department of Transportation.

The airport hosts the National Stearman Fly-in every year. The event features century-old Stearman aircraft as well as aircraft tours and lunch.

In 2021, the airport received $1.8 million as part of the State of Illinois' Rebuild Illinois program during the COVID-19 pandemic. The money went toward reconstructing the taxi lane that provides hangar access at the airport as well as replacing the fuel system at the airport.

== Facilities and aircraft ==
The airport has two asphalt runways. Runway 9/27 is 4500 x 75 ft (1372 x 23 m), while runway 1/19 is 3200 x 60 ft (975 x 18 m).

Runway 1/19 underwent a rehabilitation project in 2019 to repair damage caused by environmental stressors.

For the 12-month period ending March 31, 2020, the airport averages 33 aircraft operations per day, or about 12,000 per year. The traffic is 99% general aviation and <1% military. For that same period, there are 21 aircraft based on the airport, all airplanes: 20 single-engine and 1 multi-engine.

== Accidents and incidents ==
- In 2007, an ultralight aircraft crashed while taking off from Kewanee. The aircraft landed in a field near the airport, and the sole pilot onboard survived in fair condition.
- On November 23, 2009, a Cessna 172 Skyhawk crashed after takeoff from Kewanee. The pilot and one passenger survived the crash, but a third passenger was killed, marking what an airport manager called the first fatality at the airport.
- On August 30, 2015, a Cirrus SR22 crashed after takeoff from Kewanee. While the pilot advised he was departing Runway 19, he actually took off from runway 27. The pilot made three 360-degree turns after takeoff before crashing. Especially since instrument meteorological conditions prevailed at the time, the cause of the accident was found to be loss of control due to spatial disorientation in low IMC. Two people were killed in the crash, and one more was seriously injured.

== See also ==
- List of airports in Illinois
- Kewanee station
