= St. Louis Metro-East Airport =

St. Louis Metro-East Airport Shafer Field
- IATA: none; ICAO: none; FAA LID: IL48

Summary
- Airport type: Private-use
- Owner: Edward B. Shafer
- Serves: St. Jacob, Illinois
- Elevation AMSL: 477 ft / 145 m
- Coordinates: 38°43′58″N 089°48′24″W

Map
- Location of airport in Illinois IL48 (the United States)

Runways
Direction	Length		Surface
Direction	ft	m	Surface
13/31	2,662	811	Asphalt

Statistics (2018)
- Aircraft operations: 52,000
- Based aircraft: 42
- Source: Federal Aviation Administration

St. Louis Metro-East Airport (FAA LID: IL48), also known as Shafer Field, is a private use airport located two miles (3 km) north of the central business district of St. Jacob, in Madison County, Illinois, United States. It is privately owned by Edward B. Shafer.

== Facilities and aircraft ==
St. Louis Metro-East Airport covers an area of 29 acres (12 ha) and contains one runway designated 13/31 with a 2,662 x 50 ft (811 x 15 m) asphalt surface.

For the 12-month period ending August 31, 2018, the airport had 52,000 aircraft operations, an average of 142 per day: 98% general aviation and 2% air taxi. At that time there were 2 aircraft based at this airport: 1 glider and 1 ultralight.

== Accidents and incidents ==
- On July 2, 2022, a Piper Comanche 250 crashed after takeoff from Metro-East. One passenger died at the scene, while the pilot was taken to the hospital with critical injuries. The probable cause of the accident was found to be inadequate maintenance of the airplane fuel system, resulting in fuel exhaustion and a loss of engine power.

== See also ==
- List of airports in Illinois
