= Schaumburg Municipal Helistop =

Heliport in Schaumburg, IL, US

Coordinates: 42°02′52.0″N 088°03′09.5″W

Schaumburg Municipal Helistop Heliport
- IATA: none; ICAO: none; FAA LID: 4H1

Summary
- Owner/Operator: Village of Schaumburg
- Serves: Schaumburg, Illinois
- Time zone: UTC−06:00 (-6)
  - Summer (DST): UTC−05:00 (-5)
- Elevation AMSL: 730 ft / 223 m
- Website: https://www.villageofschaumburg.com/government/transportation/schaumburg-regional-airport/schaumburg-helistop
- Interactive map of Schaumburg Municipal Helistop Heliport

Helipads
Number	Length		Surface
Number	ft	m	Surface
H1	25 x 25	8 x 8	Concrete

Statistics (2021)
- Aircraft Movements: 800

The Schaumburg Municipal Helistop (FAA LID: 4H1) is a public-use heliport located in and owned by the Village of Schaumburg, Illinois. Established in 1989, Schaumburg was the first Chicago suburb with a public-use heliport.

The Village of Schaumburg also maintains the Schaumburg Regional Airport, a separate facility capable of handling fixed-wing aircraft and those that cannot take off or land vertically.

In 2022, Braziliain aircraft manufacturer Embraer proposed using the Schaumburg Municipal Helistop as a base to perform proving runs on its Eve eVTOL aircraft. Embraer's goal was to prove what air taxi service can look like.

== Facilities and aircraft ==
The facility has one landing area, designated H1, whose dimensions are 25 x 25 ft (8 x 8 m). The heliport also has a 12 ft x 25 ft parking area. The landing area is protected by a 100 f 115 ft perimeter.

For the 12-month period ending May 31, 2021, the airport has 67 aircraft operations per month, or about 800 per year. It consists entirely of transient general aviation. For that same time period, no aircraft are based at the heliport.

== See also ==
- List of airports in Illinois
- Schaumburg station
