= Taylorville Municipal Airport =

Public airport in Taylorville, Illinois

Coordinates: 39°31′57″N 089°19′39″W

- IATA: none; ICAO: KTAZ; FAA LID: TAZ

Summary
- Owner/Operator: City of Taylorville, Illinois
- Serves: Taylorville, Illinois
- Time zone: UTC−06:00 (-6)
  - Summer (DST): UTC−05:00 (-5)
- Elevation AMSL: 622 ft / 190 m
- Interactive map of Taylorville Municipal Airport

Runways
Direction	Length		Surface
Direction	ft	m	Surface
18/36	4,000	1,220

Statistics (2022)
- Aircraft Movements: 9,125

Taylorville Municipal Airport (ICAO: KTAZ, FAA: TAZ) is a civil public-use airport in Taylorville, Illinois. It is owned by the City of Taylorville. The airport is located near both Springfield's Abraham Lincoln Capital Airport and Decatur Airport. It has been active since March 1947.

While many airports have the same FAA and IATA codes, Taylorville is assigned TAZ by the FAA but has no code from IATA, which assigned TAZ to Daşoguz Airport in Turkmenistan.

== Facilities and aircraft ==
Taylorville Airport received $1.4 million for runway rehabilitation as part of the Rebuild Illinois initiative during the COVID-19 pandemic. The funding specifically went toward repairing runway 9/27. The funding included $1.26 million of state funding and $140,000 of local funding.

Taylorville Municipal Airport has three runways: runway 18/36 is 4001 x 75 ft and is made of asphalt; runway 9R/27L is 3501 x 60 ft and is also asphalt; runway 9L/27R is 1933 x 165 ft and is turf.

For the 12-month period ending August 31, 2022, the airport had 9,125 aircraft operations, an average of 25 per day: 99% general aviation – split between 67% local and 32% transient general aviation – and 1% air taxi. 16 aircraft are based on the field, all airplanes: 10 single-engine and 2 multiengine. It is the 99th busiest of 323 airports in Illinois.

The airport has a city-owned fixed-base operator. Besides a terminal and self-serve fuel, airport services include a courtesy car and major airframe and powerplant repair. Multiple hotels and motels are nearby.

== Accidents and incidents ==
- On October 24, 2004, a Cessna P206 crashed while operating a skydiving mission that had originated at Taylorville. At 10,500', the five parachutists onboard prepared to exit when one of the skydivers' parachutes released, jerking the jumper down in front of the plane's landing gear; the parachute got caught in the aircraft's slipstream and opened around the aircraft's control surfaces. The first skydiver subsequently jumped from the plane. The airplane pitched nose down due to drag and the flight control inputs were not responsive due to the parachute blocking the elevator and rudder airflow and drag at the right gear line entanglement point. The airplane continued in nose down pitch attitude and immediately rolled inverted and entered a flat inverted spin. Attempts to cut the stuck parachute free were unsuccessful. The pilot continued the recovery procedures to about 6,000 feet but was unsuccessful. The pilot later said that the accident parachutist would pack his own main parachutes and that none of the other club members or certified riggers touched it. The probable cause of the accident was found to be a loss of aircraft control following a premature deployment of a parachute as a parachutist exited the jump airplane during cruise flight.
- On August 11, 2012, a Beechcraft G18S operating a skydiving mission crashed into a residential neighborhood while operating at Taylorville Municipal. As skydivers were preparing to jump out of 11,000', several reported hearing the stall warning system. The airplane then suddenly rolled and all twelve parachutists quickly exited the airplane. Several of those who were last to exit reported that the airplane was inverted or partially inverted as they went out the door. Several witnesses reported seeing the airplane turning and descending in an inverted attitude when the airplane appeared to briefly recover, but then entered a nearly vertical dive. The cause of the accident was found to be the pilot's failure to maintain adequate airspeed and use the appropriate flaps setting during sport-parachuting operations, which resulted in an aerodynamic stall/spin and a subsequent loss of control. Contributing to the accident was the pilot’s failure to follow company guidance by allowing more than four passengers in the door area during exit, which shifted the airplane’s center of gravity aft.
- On June 12, 2005, a Beechcraft G58 Baron experienced a loss of left engine power subsequent impact with terrain during a go-around at Taylorville Municipal Airport. Neither pilot aboard was injured. The pilot flying was a student preparing for a multi-engine practical exam, and the accident occurred on the last landing of the last day of the 4-day training period. The instructor had wanted to practice a dual engine failure, and after giving the student an engine failure emergency, which the student reacted to properly by identifying and feathering the failed engine, the instructor pulled the other engine to idle power. The instructor then attempted to restart the feathered engine 3 miles out from Taylorville and believed the engine to have restarted when its propeller started turning. The pilot was making a straight-in approach 5 knots fast of target when the instructor noticed the aircraft was lined up for a taxiway. The instructor then added full power and called for the student to retract the landing gear when the aircraft began a left turn that the student could not control. The airplane "barely cleared a hangar," flew across the highway, went under some power wires, and landed in a corn field.

== See also ==
- List of airports in Illinois
