= Sparta Community Airport =

Coordinates: 38°08′59″N 089°41′58″W

Sparta Community Airport-Hunter Field
- IATA: SAR; ICAO: KSAR; FAA LID: SAR

Summary
- Airport type: Public
- Owner/Operator: Sparta Community Airport Authority
- Serves: Sparta, Illinois
- Location: Randolph County, Illinois
- Opened: 1950s
- Time zone: UTC−06:00 (-6)
  - Summer (DST): UTC−05:00 (-5)
- Elevation AMSL: 538 ft / 164 m
- Interactive map of Sparta Community Airport-Hunter Field

Runways
Direction	Length		Surface
Direction	ft	m	Surface
18/36	4,002	1,220	Asphalt

Statistics (2021)
- Aircraft movements: 34,000

Sparta Community Airport (IATA: SAR, ICAO: KSAR, FAA: SAR), also known as Hunter Field, is a civil, public use airport 2 miles north of Sparta in Randolph County, Illinois, United States. It is publicly owned by the Sparta Community Airport Authority.

== History ==
The airport has been operating since the 1950s.

Between 2016 and 2020, the airport completed multiple projects to maximize efficiency and minimize costs at the airport. This included the construction of new T-hangars to house up to 12 new aircraft at the field.

In 2017, the airport was named the Illinois Airport of the Year in the "General Aviation-Runway greater than 5,000 feet" category.

== Facilities and aircraft ==
The airport has two runways. Runway 18/36 is an asphalt runway measuring 4002 x 75 ft (1220 x 23 m). Runway 9/27 is a turf runway measuring 2958 x 110 ft (902 x 34 m).

The airport has a fixed-base operator (FBO) called Sparta Aero Services. It offers full- and self-service fueling, aircraft ground handling and parking, hangars, a passenger terminal, and a crew car. Flight training and aircraft rental are available for local pilots, as is aircraft maintenance.

For the 12-month period ending June 30, 2021, the airport had 93 aircraft operations per day, or about 34,000 per year. This included 75% general aviation, 18% air taxi, and 7% military. For that same time period, there were 32 aircraft based on the field: 29 single-engine and 2 multi-engine airplanes, and 1 helicopter.

== Accidents and incidents ==
- On July 9, 2002, a Piper J3 Cub sustained substantial damage during landing roll when it veered off the left side of runway 27 at Sparta Community Airport. The flight instructor on board reported that the flight was an introductory tail wheel instructional flight. At the end of the flight, the instructor took the controls to demonstrate a three-point landing. All went well until aircraft started an uncontrollable right turn on the runway. The instructor applied opposite controls but could not recover; he subsequently attempted a go-around but could not regain flying speed before encountering a ditch near the runway. The probable cause of the accident was found to be the CFI's failure to maintain directional control during landing roll and the unsuccessful attempt at a go-around.
- On March 5, 2003, a Beech A36 Bonanza crashed while on approach to Sparta. The aircraft was en route from the Duluth International Airport to Cape Girardeau Regional Airport when the pilot reported encountering icing conditions and requested to divert to Sparta. However, the pilot took so long to make the decision to divert that, by the time he was on approach, he had accumulated significant amounts of ice. The aircraft crashed within 5 miles of the airport. The probable cause of the accident was found to be the pilot's inadequate in-flight planning/decision by his flight into known icing conditions which resulted in airframe icing and degraded aircraft performance until the onset of a stall.
- On August 16, 2008, a Cessna 182 crashed while on approach to the Sparta Community Airport. Upon entry into Sparta's traffic pattern, the pilot found he could not add power despite having fuel available. The pilot then initiated an off-airport landing in a parking lot, where the aircraft was substantially damaged. The probable cause of the accident was found to be the pilot's inadequate preflight/planning, which resulted in failure to assure an adequate fuel supply for the flight and the improper flare during the landing.

== See also ==
- List of airports in Illinois
