= Havana Regional Airport =

Coordinates: 40°13′22″N 090°01′22″W

The Havana Regional Airport (9I0) is a publicly owned public-use general aviation airport located 5 miles southeast of Havana, Illinois. The closest major airport to Havana is Peoria's General Downing International.

== Airport Events ==
From 2011 through 2013, the airport closed several times for a few hours while the US Army tested a drone and trained operators on how to fly the aircraft. The events were open to the public.

The airport has previously hosted stargazing events sponsored by the Peoria Astronomy Club. Pilots are encouraged to fly in; camping is available and encouraged.

== Facilities and aircraft ==
Havana Regional has one runway: runway 9/27 is 2235 x 100 feet and is made of turf.

While the airport's runway is an engineered turf surface, there is a paved parking area for aircraft. Fuel (100LL), a courtesy car, a lounge, restrooms, and showers are also available on site. The airport is home to EAA Chapter 1420 which hosts an annual pancake breakfast one Saturday during the month of June.

There is no fixed-base operator at the airport.

For the 12-month period ending March 31, 2020, the airport averages 27 aircraft movements per week, or about 1400 per year. This traffic consists entirely of general aviation. For the same time period, there are 13 aircraft based on the field, all single-engine airplanes.

The airport is under the control of the Havana Regional Port District governed by a three-person board.

== See also ==
- List of airports in Illinois
