= Dixon Municipal Airport =

Coordinates: 41°50′02″N 089°26′39″W

Dixon Municipal Airport, also known as Charles R. Walgreen Field, is a civil, public-use airport located in and owned by the City of Dixon, Illinois. The airport ranks #1 out of airports in Lee County, Illinois and #208 of 323 airports in Illinois.

The airport has two runways. Runway 8/26 is 3897 x 75 ft (1188 x 23 m) and is made of asphalt. Runway 12/30 is 2803 x 75 ft (854 x 23 m) and is also asphalt.

There are 18 aircraft based on the field: 16 single-engine, 1 multi-engine, and 1 helicopter. For the 12-month period ending March 31, 2021, the airport averages 110 operations per day, all of which are general aviation.

Major airframe and powerplant repair services are offered on the field, as is 24-hour self-serve fueling and parking facilities.

== See also ==
- List of airports in Illinois
