= Shelby County Airport =

Shelby County Airport may refer to:

- Shelby County Airport (Alabama) in Shelby County, Alabama, United States (FAA: EET)
- Shelby County Airport (Illinois) in Shelby County, Illinois, United States (FAA: 2H0)
- Shelby County Airport (Missouri) in Shelby County, Missouri, United States (FAA: 6K2)
