= Pekin Municipal Airport =

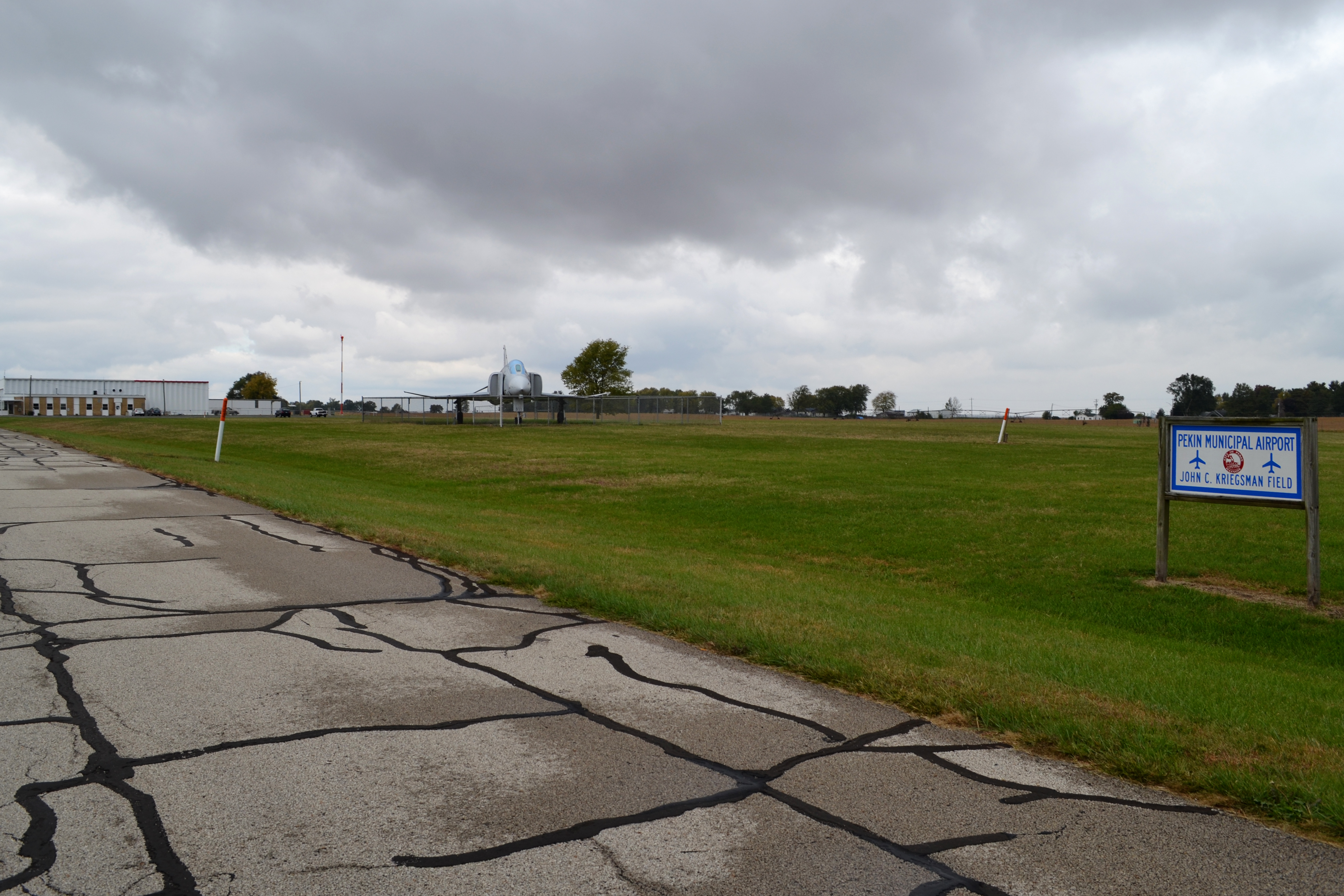
- IATA: none; ICAO: none; FAA LID: C15

Summary
- Airport type: Public
- Owner: City of Pekin
- Operator: City of Pekin
- Serves: Pekin, Illinois
- Time zone: UTC−06:00 (-6)
  - Summer (DST): UTC−05:00 (-5)
- Elevation AMSL: 530 ft (160 m)
- Coordinates: 40°29′18″N 89°40′33″W
- Website: www.pekinmunicipalairport.com

Maps
- Location of Tazewell County in Illinois

- Location of airport in Tazewell County C15 (the United States)

Runways
Direction	Length		Surface
Direction	ft	m	Surface
9/27	5,000	1,524	Asphalt

Statistics (2021)
- Aircraft operations: 9,000
- Based aircraft: 45
- Source: Federal Aviation Administration

Pekin Municipal Airport (FAA LID: C15) is a city-owned public-use airport located four nautical miles (4.6 mi; 7.4 km) south of the central business district of Pekin, a city in Tazewell County, Illinois, United States. It is included in the FAA's National Plan of Integrated Airport Systems for 2011–2015, which categorized it as a general aviation facility.

The airport was named the Illinois Department of Transportation's General Aviation Airport of the Year award in 2021. Airport management referenced significant airport upgrades as critical for the award. Later that year, the airport was set to receive nearly $2 million from the State of Illinois as part of its Rebuild Illinois program, aimed to respond to the COVID-19 pandemic. The money went towards repaving the ramp near the t-hangars, repaving the airport access road, and replacing the airport's fuel system.

== Facilities and aircraft ==
Pekin Municipal Airport covers an area of 215 acres (87 ha) at an elevation of 530 feet (160 m) above mean sea level. It has one runway designated 9/27 with an asphalt surface measuring 5,000 by 75 feet (1,524 by 23 m).

The airport has an fixed-base operator offering aviation fuel, aircraft parking, hangars, a passenger terminal, catering, and a courtesy car.

In late 2022, the airport received $1.4 million to build 20 new t-hangars at the airport. Airport managers said the plan would help make progress on allowing additional pilots to rent hangar space at the airport as there are usually roughly 20 people on the wait list for a hangar. Construction is expected to begin in late winter or early spring of 2023. Additional grants were awarded to replace the fuel system. Additionally, the airport received money from the State of Illinois as part of the Rebuild Illinois program during the COVID-19 pandemic.

For the 12-month period ending May 31, 2021, the airport had 9,000 aircraft operations, an average of 25 per day: 78% general aviation and 22% air taxi. At that time there were 45 aircraft based at this airport: 42 single-engine and 2 multi-engine airplanes as well as 1 helicopter.

== Accidents & Incidents ==
- On January 19, 2011, a Piper Cherokee 180 crashed while attempting to land at Pekin. The aircraft was practicing touch-and-gos when witnesses say it appeared to stall and impacted the runway.
- On August 18, 2016, an amateur-built Van's Aircraft RV-6A impacted terrain after taking off from runway 27 at Pekin. The pilot, who was seriously injured, told first responders that he had forgotten to latch the canopy before takeoff. He noticed 30 feet above the ground just after takeoff and got distracted trying to close it, leading to a loss of control, a stall, and a crash.

== See also ==
- List of airports in Illinois
