= Skydive Chicago Airport =

Public Use Airport in Ottawa, IL

- IATA: none; ICAO: none; FAA LID: 8N2

Summary
- Owner: Ottawa Airport Inc
- Operator: Skydive Chicago Resort
- Serves: Ottawa, Illinois
- Time zone: UTC−06:00 (-6)
  - Summer (DST): UTC−05:00 (-5)
- Elevation AMSL: 616 ft / 188 m
- Coordinates: 41°23′59″N 88°47′38″W
- Website: https://skydivechicago.com/
- Interactive map of Skydive Chicago Airport

Runways
| Direction | Length | | Surface |
| Direction | ft | m | Surface |
|---|---|---|---|
| 3/21 | 4,522 | 1,378 | Asphalt |

Statistics (2021)
- Aircraft Movements: 9,855

Skydive Chicago Airport (FAA LID: 8N2) is a privately owned, public use airport located four miles northeast of Ottawa, Illinois. The airport is the centerpiece of the Skydive Chicago Resort. Camping, RV parking, and lodging are available to skydiving guests and an observation area, and café for the general public.

== Facilities and aircraft ==
The airport has one runway: runway 3/21 measures 4522 x 50 ft (1378 x 15 m) and is made of asphalt. No fuel is available at the airport.

The airport is centered around a skydiving business called the Skydive Chicago Resort. Divers are welcome to stay at the resort for prolonged periods in order to experience more skydiving than normal. Facilities supporting the resort include cabins, a camping and RV parking area, showers, laundry, a pro shop, and meeting facilities. The airport was home to several US Skydiving National Championships including 2022 and 2024 as well as home to the 2016 World Championships of Skydiving.

The operation consists of about 10,000 flights per year. It consists entirely of skydivinggeneral aviation. The operation has 2 Cessna Caravans, 2 Twin Otters, 2 Skyvans and a Cessna 182.

== See also ==
- List of airports in Illinois
