= Greater Beardstown Airport =

Coordinates: 39°58′26″N 090°24′21″W

The Greater Beardstown Airport (FAA LID: K06) is a civil, general aviation public-use airport, located three nautical miles southeast of Beardstown, Illinois, United States. It is publicly owned by the City of Beardstown.

== Facilities and aircraft ==
The airport has one runway: runway 18/36 measures 4,000 x 60 ft (1219 x 18 meters) and is made of asphalt.

As of May 2022, there were 11 aircraft based on the field: 10 single-engine and one ultralight. For the 12-month period ending May 31, 2021, there were 2,964 aircraft operations, an average of 57 aircraft operations per week. All of them were general aviation. Based on traffic numbers, the airport ranked number 148 in terms of airports in Illinois.

The airport has nearly a dozen hangars, many of which were rebuilt after the original facilities were destroyed in a storm. No fuel is available at the airport.

In 2021, the airport received $200,000 as part of the Rebuild Illinois program during the COVID-19 pandemic to help rebuild and maintain its facilities.

== See also ==
- List of airports in Illinois
