= Albertus Airport =

Airport in the city of Freeport, Illinois

Coordinates: 42°14′38″N 089°34′58″W

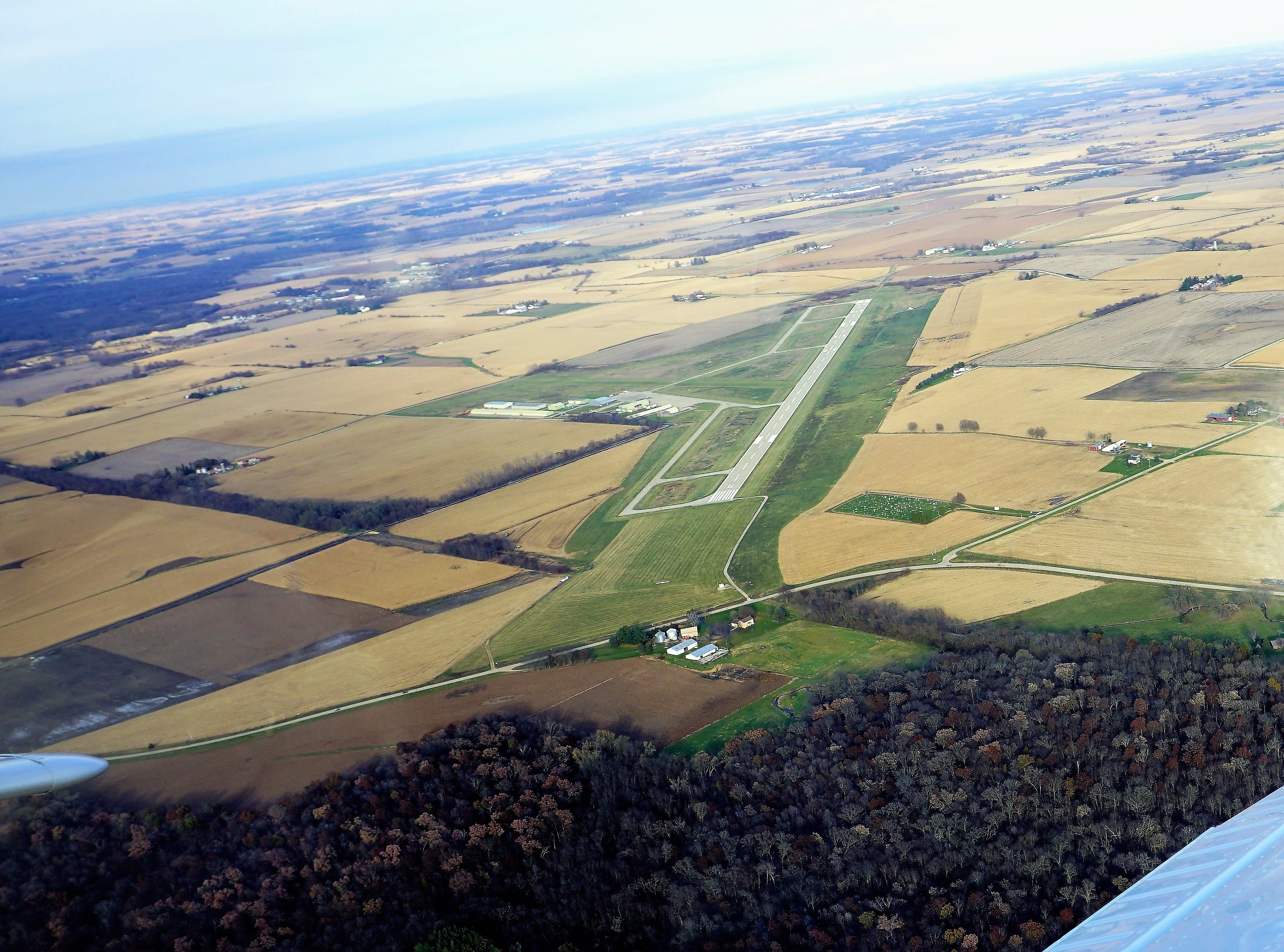
- IATA: FEP; ICAO: KFEP; LID: FEP

Summary
- Serves: Freeport, Illinois
- Location: Stephenson County, Illinois
- Time zone: UTC−06:00 (-6)
  - Summer (DST): UTC−05:00 (-5)
- Elevation AMSL: 859 ft / 262 m

Maps
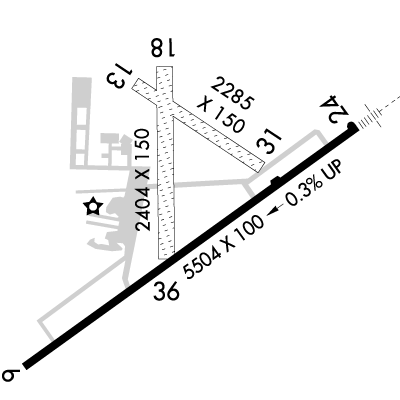
- FAA airport diagram
- Interactive map of Albertus Airport

Runways
Direction	Length		Surface
Direction	ft	m	Surface
6/24	5,504	1,678	Asphalt
18/36	2,400	732	Turf
13/31	2,285	696	Turf

Statistics (2020)
- Aircraft Movements: 20,075

Albertus Airport (IATA: FEP, ICAO: KFEP, FAA LID: FEP) is a civil public-use airport located 3 miles southeast of the city of Freeport, Illinois, United States. The airport is owned by the city.

== History ==
The airport was established in 1945. Named for brothers Henry and Peter Albertus, who donated the original land for the airport, to the city. The city purchased additional land around the Albertus farm land. Original amenities included fuel, runways, and offices for the airport's original operator.

In 1946, the airport was sold to a new owner. Later that year, the State of Illinois allotted $198,000 to the airport to improve runway conditions; work was completed in 1947.

Additional hangars were built in 1948. The airport had multiple owners until the early 1950s.

== Airshow ==
Albertus Airport is home to the Northwest Illinois Airshow. The event started in 2021 during the COVID-19 pandemic and has continued since. The one-day event features aerobatic aircraft performing stunts.

== Facilities and aircraft ==
The airport has three runways. Runway 6/24 is the longest and only hard-surface runway, measuring 5504 x 100 ft (1678 x 30 m) and made of asphalt. Runway 18/36 is 2404 x 150 ft (733 x 46 m) and made of turf, while runway 13/31 is 2285 x 150 ft (696 x 46 m) and also turf.

The airport has a fixed-base operator that sells fuel, both avgas and jet fuel. The airport has services such as general maintenance, hangars, courtesy cars, and more; it has amenities such as internet, pilot supplies, and more.

For the 12-month period ending March 31, 2020, the airport averaged 55 aircraft operations per day, or roughly 20,075 per year, all general aviation. For the same time period, there were 48 aircraft based on the field: 31 single-engine, 10 glider, 5 multi-engine, and 2 helicopter.

== See also ==
- List of airports in Illinois
