= Carmi Municipal Airport =

Civil airport in Carmi, Illinois, US

Coordinates: 38°05′22″N 088°07′23″W

- IATA: none; ICAO: KCUL; FAA LID: CUL

Summary
- Owner/Operator: City of Carmi, Illinois
- Serves: Carmi, Illinois
- Time zone: UTC−06:00 (-6)
  - Summer (DST): UTC−05:00 (-5)
- Elevation AMSL: 388 ft / 118 m
- Interactive map of Carmi Municipal Airport

Runways
Direction	Length		Surface
Direction	ft	m	Surface
18/36	4,000	1,219	Asphalt

Statistics (2021)
- Aircraft Operations: 13,500

Carmi Municipal Airport (ICAO: KCUL, FAA LID: CUL) is a public-use civil airport located in and owned by the city of Carmi, Illinois. The airport is near Illinois's border with Indiana and the Wabash River. The closest major airport is Evansville Regional Airport, 28 miles to the east.

== Facilities and aircraft ==
Carmi Municipal Airport has one runway: runway 18/36 is 4000 x 75 ft (1213 x 23 m) and is made of asphalt.

The City of Carmi operates an fixed-base operator on the airport with vending machines, cooking equipment, courtesy cars, lounges, work stations, a conference room, and restrooms. Self-serve fuel and tiedowns available at the airport.

For the 12-month period ending March 31, 2021, the airport averaged 37 aircraft operations per day, or about 13,500 per year. This traffic was composed entirely of general aviation. There are 20 aircraft based at the field, all airplanes: 19 single-engine and 1 multiengine.

== See also ==
- List of airports in Illinois
