= Mount Carmel Municipal Airport =

Coordinates: 38°36′20″N 087°43′34″W

- IATA: none; ICAO: KAJG; FAA LID: AJG

Summary
- Owner: City of Mt Carmel
- Serves: Mount Carmel, Illinois
- Location: Wabash County, Illinois
- Built: 1942
- In use: 1942-1948 (Military)
- Time zone: UTC−06:00 (-6)
  - Summer (DST): UTC−05:00 (-5)
- Elevation AMSL: 429 ft / 131 m
- Interactive map of Mount Carmel Municipal Airport

Runways
Direction	Length		Surface
Direction	ft	m	Surface
13/31	4,300	1,372	Asphalt

Statistics (2022)
- Aircraft movements: 11,000

Mount Carmel Municipal Airport (ICAO: KAJG, FAA LID: AJG) is a civil, public use airport located 12 miles north of Mount Carmel, Illinois, United States. The airport is publicly owned by the City of Mt Carmel.

The airport is often a stop for pilots enroute to the EAA AirVenture event in Oshkosh, Wisconsin. Aircraft use the airport to refuel on their journey north.

== History ==
The airport was founded as Presbyterian Field. It was authorized in 1942 as part of the expansion of pilot training bases by the Air Corps Flying Training Command.

The airport was one of four airports to support George Field, which served as a pilot training base during World War II.

The original Presbyterian Airport included four 5,200 ft concrete and asphalt runways.

The first flight school opened at the airport on August 10, 1942. It sent newly-trained pilots to George Field

Land for Mt Carmel Airport was deeded to the City from the U.S. government in 1948. The airport has a dedicated historical and development foundation to continue upkeep and preservation at the airport.

In 2021, a company started a push to privatize the Mount Carmel Municipal Airport's management.

== Facilities and aircraft ==
The airport has two asphalt runways. Runway 13/31 is 4500 x 75 ft (1372 x 23 m), and runway 4/22 is 4000 x 100 ft (1219 x 30 m).

The airport has a fixed-base operator. Services available at the airport include fueling, hangars, courtesy cars, and a pilot's lounge; jet fuel has been available in addition to avgas since 2017. An A&P mechanic as well as flight instruction are available at the airport.

In 2022, the airport received $615,000 to construct a new T-hangar. In 2023, the airport received nearly $500,000 from the Illinois Department of Transportation for upgrades.

For the 12-month period ending May 31, 2022, the airport had 30 aircraft operations per day, or roughly 11,000 per year. This included 91% general aviation, 7% air taxi, and 2% military. For the same time period, there were 14 aircraft based on the field: 12 single-engine airplanes, 1 multi-engine airplane, and 1 helicopter.

== See also ==
- List of airports in Illinois
