= Mercer County Airport (Illinois) =

- IATA: none; ICAO: none; FAA LID: C00

Summary
- Airport type: Public
- Owner: Mercer County
- Serves: Aledo, Illinois
- Time zone: UTC−06:00 (-6)
  - Summer (DST): UTC−05:00 (-5)
- Elevation AMSL: 740 ft / 226 m
- Coordinates: 41°14′55″N 090°44′14″W

Map
- Location of airport in Illinois C00 (the United States)

Runways
| Direction | Length | | Surface |
| Direction | ft | m | Surface |
|---|---|---|---|
| 17/35 | 2,480 | 756 | Asphalt |

Statistics (2010)
- Aircraft operations: 4,000
- Source: Federal Aviation Administration

Mercer County Airport (FAA LID: C00) is a county-owned, public-use airport in Mercer County, Illinois, United States. It is located three nautical miles (6 km) northeast of the central business district of Aledo, Illinois. This airport is included in the National Plan of Integrated Airport Systems for 2011–2015, which categorized it as a general aviation facility.

== Facilities and aircraft ==
Mercer County Airport covers an area of 15 acres (6 ha) at an elevation of 740 feet (226 m) above mean sea level. It has one runway designated 17/35 with an asphalt surface measuring 2,480 by 45 feet (756 x 14 m). For the 12-month period ending June 30, 2017, the airport had roughly 6,200 aircraft operations, an average of 17 per day. All were general aviation. For that same time period, there were three aircraft based on the field, all single-engine airplanes.

== See also ==
- List of airports in Illinois
