= Ogle County Airport =

- IATA: none; ICAO: none; FAA LID: C55

Summary
- Airport type: Public
- Owner: Ogle County Pilots Inc.
- Serves: Mount Morris, Illinois
- Elevation AMSL: 929 ft / 283 m
- Coordinates: 42°02′14″N 89°23′34″W
- Website: http://www.oglecountyairport.com/

Maps
- Location of Ogle County in Illinois

- Location of airport in Ogle County

Runways
Direction	Length		Surface
Direction	ft	m	Surface
9/27	2,640	805	Turf

Statistics (2019)
- Aircraft operations: 6,500
- Based aircraft: 14
- Source: Federal Aviation Administration

Ogle County Airport (FAA LID: C55) is a public use airport located two nautical miles (2.3 mi; 3.7 km) southeast of the central business district of Mount Morris, a village in Ogle County, Illinois, United States. The airport is privately owned by Ogle County Pilots Inc.

== Facilities and aircraft ==
Ogle County Airport covers an area of 42 acres (17 ha) at an elevation of 929 feet (283 m) above mean sea level. It has one runway, designated 9/27, with a turf surface measuring 2,640 by 200 feet (805 by 61 m).

For the 12-month period ending July 31, 2019, the airport had roughly 6,500 general aviation aircraft operations, an average of 17 per day. Operations consisted entirely of general aviation traffic. At that time there were 14 aircraft based at this airport: 93% single-engine and 7% ultralight.

== See also ==
- List of airports in Illinois
