= Greater Kankakee Airport =

- IATA: IKK; ICAO: KIKK; FAA LID: IKK

Summary
- Airport type: Public
- Owner/Operator: Kankakee Valley Airport Authority
- Serves: Kankakee, Illinois
- Opened: 1962
- Built: 1961
- Time zone: UTC−06:00 (-6)
  - Summer (DST): UTC−05:00 (-5)
- Elevation AMSL: 629 ft (192 m)
- Coordinates: 41°04′17″N 087°50′47″W
- Public transit access: SHOW Bus (dial-a-ride)
- Website: www.kvaa.com

Map
- Location of airport in Illinois IKK (the United States)

Runways
Direction	Length		Surface
Direction	ft	m	Surface
4/22	5,981	1,823	Asphalt
16/34	4,398	1,341	Asphalt

Statistics (2023)
- Aircraft operations: 50,000
- Based aircraft: 71
- Source: Federal Aviation Administration

Greater Kankakee Airport (IATA: IKK, ICAO: KIKK, FAA LID: IKK) is a public use airport located three nautical miles (6 km) south of the central business district of Kankakee, a city in Kankakee County, Illinois, United States. It is included in the National Plan of Integrated Airport Systems for 2011–2015, which categorized it as a general aviation facility.

The airport was opened in 1962 and continues to operate as a general aviation facility serving the Kankakee area and South Chicago. It is 60 miles (97 km) south of Chicago and 75 miles (121 km) north of Champaign, Illinois. It is the largest airport between the Chicago Midway Airport and the Champaign Airport. Greater Kankakee is a general aviation airport, consisting of mostly private aircraft with a mix of corporate and business aircraft usage.

The airport is owned and operated by the Kankakee Valley Airport Authority. The authority has an appointed board of directors totaling six members: three members from the Kankakee County Board and one each from the communities of Kankakee, Bradley, and Bourbonnais.

== History ==
In the 1950s, Lake Central Airlines and Ozark Airlines expressed interest in serving Kankakee but could not because the Greater Kankakee Airport predecessor was not big enough to handle Douglas DC-3s flown by the airline. The Kankakee Valley Airport Authority was developed to address this issue.

In 1959, the Kankakee Valley Airport Authority selected a new site for an updated airport facility. The groundbreaking ceremony at the new site was held in May 1961, and the new airport opened in 1962.

The airport received airline service to O'Hare International Airport on board Air Wisconsin, starting in 1968.

== Facilities and aircraft ==
=== Facilities ===
Greater Kankakee Airport covers an area of 950 acres (384 ha) at an elevation of 629 feet (192 m) above mean sea level. It has two runways with asphalt surfaces: 4/22 is 5,981 by 100 feet (1,823 x 30 m) and 16/34 is 4,398 by 75 feet (1,341 x 23 m).

The airplane has a fixed-base operator that sells fuel. Services include general maintenance, catering, hangars, and courtesy transportation; amenities include conference rooms, pilot supplies, a crew lounge, and more.

In 2020, the airport received nearly $200,000 for runway upgrades through the federal CARES Act.

The airport received $1.6 million from the State of Illinois as part of the Rebuild Illinois program during the COVID-19 pandemic. The airport planned to upgrade the airport's north–south runway and relocate one of the main taxiway ramps. Talks to upgrade these facilities had already been in the works for years, as the airport aimed to be able to accept larger aircraft on a more frequent basis by adding width and runway strength. Upgrades were expected to be completed in 2023.

=== National Guard facilities ===
The airport is home to a base of the Illinois National Guard’s Company B, 106th Aviation Battalion and Company B(-), 935th Aviation Battalion in addition to two UH-60 Black Hawk aviation companies. The companies were originally based at Chicago's Midway International Airport but left because they needed more space.

A 64,000-square-foot readiness center was built at the Greater Kankakee Airport and includes office space, classrooms, locker rooms, restrooms and supply warehousing, as well as a surface maintenance bay, a kitchen facility and a 6,000-square-foot assembly hall.

There is also a 121,200-square-foot facility that includes a maintenance hangar, a storage hangar, supporting maintenance shops, classrooms and administrative space, exterior lighting, fencing, parking areas and roadway, and a fuel storage and dispensing system.

=== Aircraft ===
For the 12-month period ending August 31, 2023, the airport had 50,000 aircraft operations, an average of 137 per day: 92% general aviation, 6% military, and 2% air taxi. At that time, there were 71 aircraft based at this airport: 62 single-engine and 8 multi-engine airplanes, and 1 jet.

== Accidents and incidents ==
- On May 27, 2001, a Zenith CH 200 crashed after departing from Kankakee. The reason for the loss of control could not be determined.
- On October 19, 2005, a Cessna 210C landed with its landing gear retracted at the Greater Kankakee Airport. The pilot was diverting to IKK as a precautionary measure after engine issues. When the pilot attempted to lower the landing gear, it would only partially extend, and her attempts to use the emergency gear extender were unsuccessful. The probable cause of the accident was found to be a hydraulic line leak causing a loss of hydraulic fluid and subsequent failure of the hydraulic system.
- On August 17, 2013, a Cessna 172 Skyhawk struck a deer while taking off from the Greater Kankakee Airport. The pilot completed a successful traffic pattern and returned to the airport for a safe landing.
- On February 21, 2015, a Cessna 172 Skyhawk was damaged while landing at the Greater Kankakee Airport. During landing practice, the student pilot over controlled the airplane during the flare. The flight instructor attempted to correct the flight control inputs; however, he was unable to overcome the strength of the student pilot on the flight controls. The airplane struck a bank of snow on the left side of the runway and nosed over. The probable cause of the accident was found to be the student pilot's improper flight control inputs resulting in the loss of control during the landing flare.
- On June 26, 2016, a Cessna 182 Skylane performing skydiving operations at the Greater Kankakee Airport was damaged in an off airport landing. The pilot commenced a spiraling descent back to the airport after dropping a load of skydivers, but since the wind had changed to a tailwind, he initiated a go-around during his approach. However, when the pilot advanced the throttle, the engine initially surged and then lost power. The pilot made a forced landing in a corn field near the end of the runway. The probable cause of the accident was found to be a total loss of engine power due to fuel starvation, which resulted from the low level of fuel unporting during a rapid spiraling descent.
- On July 5, 2017, a Cessna A188B was damaged while landing at the Greater Kankakee Airport. The pilot reported he made a three-point landing, but the airspeed was high, and the airplane bounced. The airplane then descended and landed on the main landing gear. As the airspeed decreased, and the tail wheel settled to the runway, the pilot felt that he did not have rudder authority and he mistakenly attempted to apply heel brakes even though the accident airplane had toe brakes.

== See also ==
- Kankakee Airport (FAA: 3KK), located at 41°05′47″N 087°54′38″W
- List of airports in Illinois
- Kankakee station
