= Shelby County Airport (Illinois) =

Public Use Airport in Shelbyville, Illinois

- IATA: none; ICAO: none; FAA LID: 2H0

Summary
- Airport type: Public
- Operator: Shelby County
- Location: Shelbyville, Illinois
- Time zone: UTC−06:00 (-6)
  - Summer (DST): UTC−05:00 (-5)
- Elevation AMSL: 618 ft / 188.4 m
- Coordinates: 39°24′38″N 88°50′44″W

Map
- Location of airport in Illinois 2H0 (the United States)

Runways
Direction	Length		Surface
Direction	ft	m	Surface
18/36	4,098	1,249	Asphalt
14/32	2,336	712	Grass
4/22	1,446	441	Turf

Statistics (2019)
- Annual Aircraft Operations: 16,000
- Based Aircraft: 21

Shelby County Airport (FAA LID: 2H0) is a public airport located three miles (4.8 km) west of the central business district (CBD) of Shelbyville, a city in Shelby County, Illinois, United States. A significant amount of the airport's traffic is from agricultural aviation serving nearby areas.

== Facilities and aircraft ==
Shelby County Airport covers 215 acres (87 ha) and has three runways: Runway 18/36 measures 4,098 x 75 ft. (1,249 x 23 m) and is paved with asphalt. Runway 14/32 measures 2336 x 180 ft. (712 x 55 m) and is made of turf. Runway 4/22 measures 1446 x 180 ft. (441 x 55 m) and is also made of turf.

There is one fixed-base operator at the airport. It offers self-service fuel as well as a lounge and courtesy car.

For the 12-month period ending August 31, 2022, the airport averages 44 aircraft operations per day, or about 16,000 per year. This is 97% general aviation and 3% military. For the same time period, there are 21 aircraft based on the field, all single-engine airplanes.

== Accidents & Incidents ==
- On April 1, 2000, an Aerotek PITTS S-2A crashed while attempting to land on 2H0's runway 14. The aircraft impacted a golf cart applying weed killer near the airport. The gold cart driver received fatal injuries. The probable cause of the crash was the pilot's improper touchdown point and runway alignment, with contributing factors including insufficient gold cart markings and the fact that the golf cart was not equipped with a radio. Additional factors include the fact that airport personnel neglected to issue NOTAMs to notify pilots that maintenance was ongoing.
- On April 21, 2010, an experimental Murray Starlite aircraft was substantially damaged while landing at the Shelbyville Airport. The left main tire “locked up” and the airplane veered to the left. The pilot applied full right rudder and aileron, but the airplane continued to veer off the left side of the runway. The airplane sustained substantial damage when it entered a plowed field, which caused the main landing gear to collapse and the left main tire to go through the left wing. The probable cause of the accident was found to be the corrosion of the left landing gear rotor and brake, which resulted in the loss of directional control during the landing rollout, and the pilot's inadequate preflight inspection.

== See also ==
- List of airports in Illinois
