= Marshall County Airport (Illinois) =

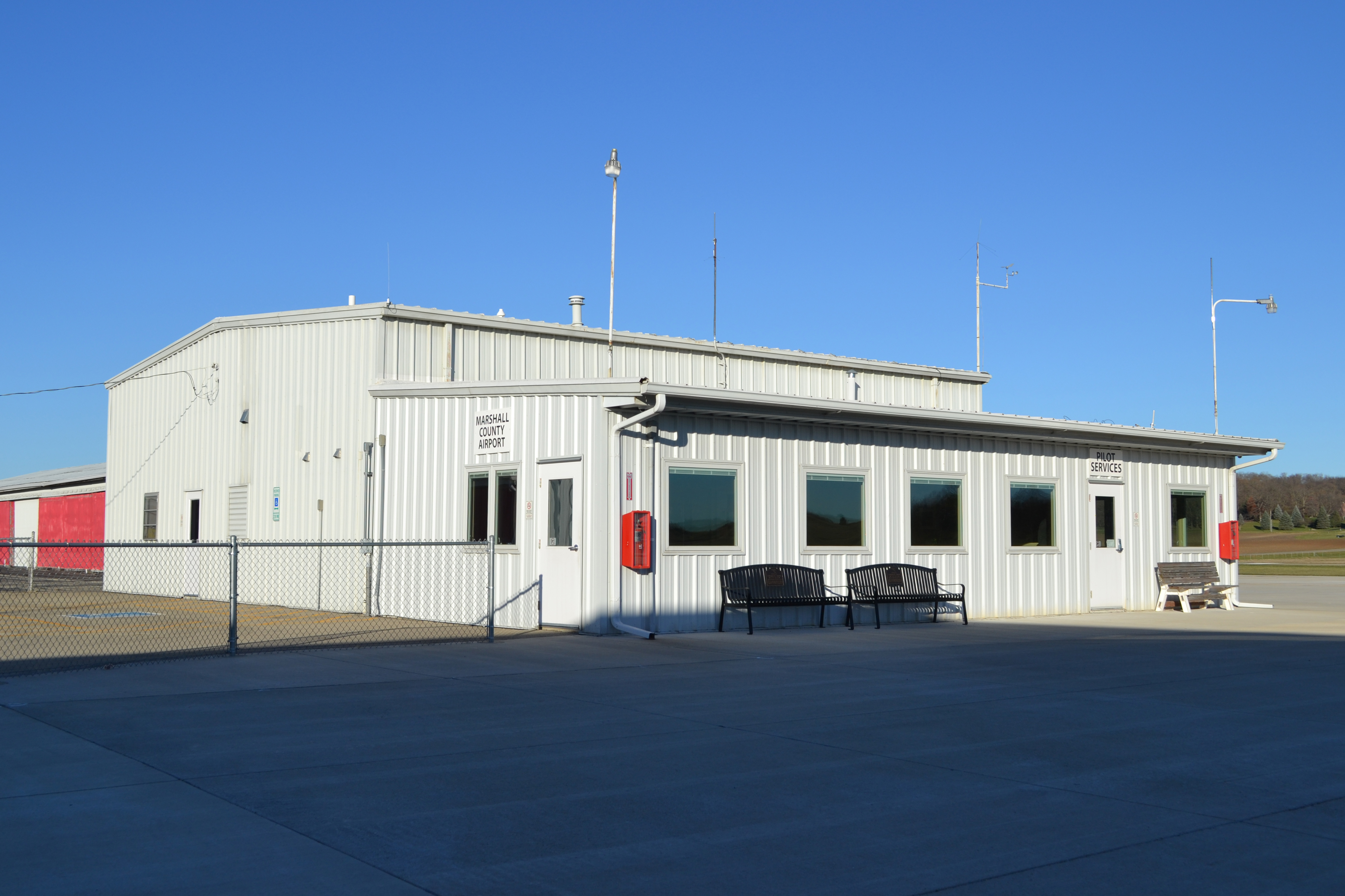
- Marshall County Airport - Pilot Services building
- IATA: none; ICAO: none; FAA LID: C75

Summary
- Airport type: Public
- Owner: Marshall County
- Serves: Marshall County, Illinois
- Location: Lacon, Illinois
- Time zone: UTC−06:00 (-6)
  - Summer (DST): UTC−05:00 (-5)
- Elevation AMSL: 568 ft / 178 m
- Coordinates: 41°01′09″N 089°23′11″W

Map
- Location of airport in Illinois C75 (the United States)

Runways
Direction	Length		Surface
Direction	ft	m	Surface
13/31	3,200	975	Asphalt
18/36	2,200	671	Asphalt

Statistics (2022)
- Aircraft operations: 19,000
- Based aircraft: 49
- Source: Federal Aviation Administration

Marshall County Airport (FAA LID: C75) is a county-owned, public-use airport in Marshall County, Illinois, United States. It is located one nautical mile (2 km) east of the central business district of Lacon, Illinois. This airport is included in the National Plan of Integrated Airport Systems for 2011–2015, which categorized it as a general aviation facility.

The Marshall County Flying Club is a non-profit organization founded in 1954 by aviation enthusiasts in Lacon, IL. It offers flight training, aircraft rental, and social events for its members. The club is dedicated to promoting aviation and provides opportunities for members to fly and share their passion for flying.

== Facilities and aircraft ==
Marshall County Airport covers an area of 250 acres at an elevation of 568 feet above mean sea level. It has two runways with asphalt surfaces: 13/31 is 4,003 by 75 feet and 18/36 is 2,200 by 50 feet.

The airport offers a passenger terminal, courtesy vehicles, a pilot lounge, nap rooms, a public phone, and a fixed base operator that provides fuel as well as aircraft parking and hangars. There is a flying club at the airport offering flight instruction and aircraft rental.

For the 12-month period ending April 30, 2022, the airport had 19,000 aircraft operations, an average of 52 per day: 93% general aviation, 5% air taxi, and 2% military. At that time there were 49 aircraft based at this airport, all airplanes: 48 single-engine and 1 multi-engine.

== See also ==
- List of airports in Illinois
