= Earlville Airport =

- IATA: none; ICAO: none; FAA LID: C94

Summary
- Airport type: Public
- Serves: Earlville, Illinois
- Elevation AMSL: 690 ft (210 m)
- Coordinates: 41°33′59″N 088°56′53″W
- Interactive map of Earlville Airport

Runways
Direction	Length		Surface
Direction	ft	m	Surface
4/22	3,400	1,036	Turf

Statistics (2007)
- Aircraft operations: 2,000
- Source: Federal Aviation Administration

Earlville Airport (FAA LID: C94) was a public use airport located two nautical miles (3.7 km) southwest of the central business district of Earlville, a city in LaSalle County, Illinois, United States.

== Facilities and aircraft ==
Earlville Airport covered an area of 12 acres (4.9 ha) at an elevation of 690 feet (210 m) above mean sea level. It had one runway designated 4/22 with a turf surface measuring 3,400 by 100 feet (1,036 x 30 m). For the 12-month period ending December 31, 2007, the airport had 2,000 general aviation aircraft operations, an average of 166 per month.

Google Earth aerial photography shows the airport closing sometime between October 2009 and August 2010 (15 years ago). The grass runway has been replaced by agricultural crops, though the former aircraft parking area, also known as the "ramp," remained visible in imagery as of September 2015. As of 2026, it appears that the entire area has been repurposed.
