= Hillsboro Municipal Airport (Illinois) =

- IATA: none; ICAO: none; FAA LID: 3K4

Summary
- Airport type: Public
- Owner: City of Hillsboro, IL
- Serves: Hillsboro, Illinois
- Elevation AMSL: 637 ft (194 m)
- Coordinates: 39°08′40″N 089°27′25″W
- Interactive map of Hillsboro Municipal Airport

Runways
Direction	Length		Surface
Direction	ft	m	Surface
18/36	4,150	1,265	Turf

Statistics (2005)
- Aircraft operations: 3,000
- Based aircraft: 8
- Source: Federal Aviation Administration

Hillsboro Municipal Airport (FAA LID: 3K4) was a city-owned, public-use airport located two nautical miles (4 km) southeast of the central business district of Hillsboro, a city in Montgomery County, Illinois, United States.

The closest existing airport is Litchfield Municipal Airport. For commercial service, the community of Hillsboro is served by St. Louis Lambert International and Abraham Lincoln Capital Airport.

== Facilities and aircraft ==
Hillsboro Municipal Airport covered an area of 30 acres (12 ha) at an elevation of 637 feet (194 m) above mean sea level. It had one runway designated 18/36 with a turf surface measuring 4,150 by 200 feet (1,265 x 61 m).

For the 12-month period ending October 31, 2005, the airport had 3,000 general aviation aircraft operations, an average of 250 per month. At that time there were 8 aircraft based at this airport, all single-engine airplanes.

In 2008, the airport was closed and the ground leased to a local coal mining operation.
