= Fighting Illini Sports Network =

Collegiate sports radio network

- Type: Radio network
- Country: United States
- Headquarters: Champaign, Illinois
- Broadcast area: Illinois; Missouri (limited); Iowa (limited)
- Owner: Learfield

The Fighting Illini Sports Network (also known as the Busey Bank Illini Sports Network for sponsorship reasons) is a group of radio stations in Illinois, Missouri, and Iowa that broadcast Illinois Fighting Illini athletic events. The network is managed by Fighting Illini Sports Properties, a Learfield company, whose offices are located in Champaign, Illinois.

== Personalities ==
- Brian Barnhart, football and men's basketball play-by-play
- Carey Davis, football color analyst (splits schedule with Mitchell)
- Kevin Mitchell, football color analyst (splits schedule with Davis)
- Doug Altenberger, men's basketball color analyst (splits schedule with Thomas)
- Deon Thomas, men's basketball color analyst (splits schedule with Altenberger)
- Tim Ditman, volleyball play-by-play
- Mike Koon, women's basketball play-by-play
- Kendall Bostic, women's basketball color analyst
- Scott Beatty, baseball and softball play-by-play

== Current radio affiliates ==
Unless otherwise stated in the notes, every station carries the football and men's basketball game broadcasts and associated coach's shows.

Station	Frequency	City	Format	Notes
WRMJ	FM 102.3	Aledo, IL	Country	
WBGZ	AM 1570; FM 94.3; FM 107.1	Alton, IL	Talk radio	Serves Northern St. Louis & Metro-East area
WIBH	AM 1440; FM 102.5	Anna, IL	Classic Country	
WCAZ	AM 1510; FM 99.1	Carthage, IL	Country	
WDWS	AM 1400; FM 93.9	Champaign, IL	Talk radio	Owned by Community Media Group; Carries game broadcasts of baseball, softball, volleyball, women's basketball as well
WHMS	FM 97.5	Champaign, IL	Adult Contemporary	Owned by Community Media Group
WLS	AM 890	Chicago, IL	Talk radio	Initial five-year agreement began 2019.
WDAN	AM 1490	Danville, IL	Talk radio	
WDNL	FM 102.1	Danville, IL	Adult Contemporary	
WFXN	AM 1230	Davenport, IA	Sports	Serves Quad Cities area
WSOY	AM 1340	Decatur, IL	Talk radio	
WJEZ	FM 98.9	Dwight, IL	Classic Hits	
WHQQ	FM 98.9	Effingham, IL	Sports	
WFIW	AM 1390; FM 103.3	Fairfield, Illinois	Talk Radio / Sports	
WGIL	AM 1400; FM 93.7	Galesburg, Illinois	Talk Radio / Sports	No coach's shows
WPMB	FM 102.7	Greenville, Illinois	Adult Contemporary	
WJIL	AM 1550; FM 97.1	Jacksonville, Illinois	Talk radio	
WJVO	FM 102.9	Jacksonville, Illinois	Country	
WJBM	AM 1480; FM 104.7	Jerseyville, Illinois	Country	
WAOX	FM 105.3	Litchfield, Illinois	Adult contemporary	No coach's shows
WGGH	AM 1150; FM 98.1	Marion, Illinois	Talk radio	
WMMC	FM 105.9	Marshall, Illinois	Classic hits	
WSJD	FM 100.5	Mt. Carmel, Illinois	Oldies	
WINI	AM 1420; FM 93.5	Murphysboro, Illinois	Oldies	
WVLN	FM 107.1	Newton, Illinois	Sports	
WVLN	AM 740	Olney, Illinois	Sports	
WPXN	FM 104.9	Paxton, Illinois	Adult contemporary	
WZPN	FM 101.1	Peoria, Illinois	Sports	
WBBA	FM 97.5	Pittsfield, Illinois	Adult hits	
WZOE	AM 1490	Princeton, Illinois	Talk radio	
WTAD	AM 930; FM 103.3	Quincy, Illinois	Talk radio	No coach's shows
WTAY	AM 1570; FM 94.3	Robinson, Illinois	News/Talk/Sports/Classic Hits	Carries men's basketball game broadcast and both coach's shows
WTYE	FM 101.7	Robinson, Illinois	Classic hits	Only carries football game broadcast
WROK	AM 1440; FM 96.1	Rockford, Illinois	News/talk	
WKXQ	FM 92.5	Rushville, Illinois	Adult standards	
WJBD	FM 100.1	Salem, Illinois	Full-service radio	
WHCO	AM 1230; FM 97.3	Sparta, Illinois	Country	
WMAY	FM 97.7; AM 970; FM 94.7; FM 102.5	Springfield, Illinois	Talk radio	
WFMB	AM 1450; FM 92.3	Springfield, Illinois	Sports	
KLIS	AM 590	St. Louis, Missouri	Talk radio	
WSDR	AM 1240; FM 93.1	Sterling, Illinois	Talk radio	
WMKR	FM 94.3-2; FM 104.1	Taylorville/Tower Hill/Shelbyville, Illinois	Country	
WPMB	AM 1500; FM 102.7; FM 104.7	Vandalia, Illinois	Adult Contemporary	
WGFA	FM 94.1; FM 94.1-1	Watseka, Illinois	Adult Contemporary	
