= WINI =

Coordinates: 37°45′30″N 89°14′02″W

- Murphysboro, Illinois; United States
- Broadcast area: Carbondale/Southern Illinois
- Frequency: 1420 kHz
- Branding: Cool 93.5 and 1420

Programming
- Format: Oldies
- Affiliations: Westwood One

Ownership
- Owner: Southern Illinois Radio Group

History
- First air date: September 15, 1954

Technical information
- Licensing authority: FCC
- Facility ID: 54817
- Class: D
- Power: 420 watts day 53 watts night
- Translator: 93.5 W228DP (Murphysboro)

Links
- Public license information: Public file; LMS
- Website: southernillinoisiscool.com

WINI (1420 AM) is a radio station broadcasting an oldies format. Licensed to Murphysboro, Illinois, the station is owned by Southern Illinois Radio Group, and carries Westwood One's Good Time Oldies network.

== History ==
The station began broadcasting September 15, 1954, and ran 500 watts, during daytime hours only. Nighttime operations were added on September 14, 1978, running 500 watts with a directional array.

The station aired an adult contemporary format in the 1980s. In 1990, WINI adopted a news-talk format. The station carried a variety of local programming and nationally syndicated shows such as Glenn Beck, Dr. Laura, John Gibson, Jim Bohannon, and Phil Hendrie. On August 22, 2016, the station adopted an oldies format.

== Translator ==
In September 2015, WINI began to be rebroadcast on 93.5 FM, through a translator in Carbondale, Illinois (W228DC). Now licensed to Sparta, Illinois on 97.3 FM as W247CP, the translator rebroadcasts WHCO.
