= Southern Illinois Speech and Acting League =

Southern Illinois Speech and Acting League (SISAL), formerly known as Egyptian Forensics League till 2015, is a forensics league of Southern Illinois. It comprises sixteen schools competing in various events.

== Events ==
- Dramatic Duet Acting (DDA)
- Dramatic Interpretation (DI)
- Extemporaneous Speaking (EXTEMP)
- Humorous Duet Acting (HDA)
- Humorous Interpretation (HI)
- Impromptu Speaking (IMPT)
- Informative Speaking (INFO)
- Oratorical Declamation (DEC)
- Original Comedy (OC)
- Original Oratory (OO)
- Poetry Reading (PT)
- Prose Reading (PR)
- Radio Speaking (RADIO)
- Special Occasion Speaking (SOS)

== Competing Schools ==
- Belleville East
- Belleville West
- Benton Consolidated High School (BCHS)
- Carbondale
- Carrier Mills
- Chatham
- DuQuoin
- East St. Louis
- Harrisburg
- Herrin
- Johnston City
- Lebanon
- Lincoln
- Marion
- Mt. Vernon
- O'Fallon
- Springfield High School (Illinois)
- Waterloo
