= WBBA-FM =

- Pittsfield, Illinois; United States
- Broadcast area: Pittsfield, Illinois; Jacksonville, Illinois, micropolitan area Pike County, Missouri
- Frequency: 97.5 MHz
- Branding: B97.5 Today's Best Mix

Programming
- Format: Adult hits
- Affiliations: CBS Radio, St. Louis Cardinals, Fighting Illini Sports Network

Ownership
- Owner: Mike Batchelor; (Cornerstone Media Group LLC)

History
- First air date: 1966
- Call sign meaning: We Broadcast the Best Agriculture.

Technical information
- Licensing authority: FCC
- Facility ID: 62351
- Class: B1
- ERP: 10,000 Watts
- HAAT: 93 meters (305 ft)
- Transmitter coordinates: 39°34′53.0″N 90°47′52.0″W

Links
- Public license information: Public file; LMS
- Webcast: https://free.rcast.net/66097
- Website: B975Radio.com

WBBA-FM is a broadcast radio station serving the Pittsfield, Jacksonville, Illinois and West Central Illinois areas, as well as parts of Northeastern Missouri including the Pike County, Missouri and Northern Lincoln County, MO areas.

WBBA-FM is owned and operated by Mike Batchelor, through licensee Cornertstone Media Group, LLC. headed by Mike Batchelor, which closed on the purchase of the station from Doug Smith's GBI Communications, LLC on August 17, 2026. Cornerstone had ran the station under a LMA from GBI Communications since August 2025. The station is known on the air as B97.5, and airs a full service Adult Hits music format.

WBBA-FM airs games and programming of the St. Louis Cardinals professional baseball team.

== History ==
WBBA Signed on the Air in December of 1954 under the ownership of a preacher who had started several stations in the region. Within a couple of years, the Meyer family acquired the station, which signed on with 170W of Power daytime at 1580 AM from a tower just to the south of Pittsfield. In 1966, WBBA-FM was added at 97.7 MHz with 3,000 Watts of Power. The Meyer Family sold the station in the late 1980s, in the 80s it was owned by Larry Hanna, a man he sold it to, and then Hanna took its operation back before selling the stationto Gary Brown, a St. Louis, MO radio personality, who hired David Fuhler as its General Manager. Fuhler would later be a partner in D&J Two Rivers Radio the longtime owner of WBBA-FM from 2003 to 2021.

WBBA AM ceased to exist in 1996 and the station went to FM only after a dispute with the landowner of the WBBA AM tower, which also supported the FM station at that time. The FM station at that time was moved to a tower on the east side of Pittsfield; and the license to the AM station was never rebuilt and its license was cancelled by the Federal Communications Commission in 2000.

WBBA had been dark from May of 2024 after a purchase of the station by principals of KJFM in Louisiana, MO failed to close with the Federal Communications Commission, and a Simulcast of KJFM that began early in 2024 abruptly ended and the station was filed as silent with the Federal Communications Commission. Jim Fishback's Jimmy Fish Productions returned the station to the air in late February of 2025 with Hot Adult Contemporary Music. In August 2025, Cornerstone Media Group led by former WBBA General Manager Mike Batchelor took over operation of the radio station and changed the format to Adult Hits with some Country Music mixed in per local tastes.

DJ Two Rivers Radio purchased WBBA-FM in 2003, along with sister station WJBM, from Brown Radio Group Inc. for $320,000 in 2003. WBBA-FM aired a country music format at the time of its sale, and was branded "Double Barreled Country".

Effective March 14, 2022, DJ Two Rivers Radio transferred the licenses for WBBA-FM and sister station WJBM, and the construction permit for translator W284DN, to Doug Smith's GBI Communications, LLC as settlement of a lawsuit between the two parties.

On February 22, 2025, after being silent since May 2024, WBBA-FM returned to the air and began stunting towards a new format to launch on March 17, 2025.

On March 18, 2025, WBBA-FM signed back on the air with a new full service Hot Adult Contemporary format featuring The TJ Show in the morning, St. Louis Cardinals baseball, Ag reports, local news, sports, weather reports, and other local programming.

== Previous logo ==
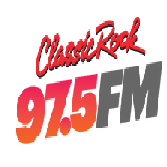
