= WJBM =

- Jerseyville, Illinois; United States
- Broadcast area: Jersey, Greene, and Calhoun counties
- Frequency: 1480 kHz
- Branding: The Best Country 104.7/1480

Programming
- Format: Country music
- Affiliations: Fox News Radio

Ownership
- Owner: Chris Lorton; (First Cut Media, LLC)

History
- First air date: June 23, 1960 (first license granted)

Technical information
- Facility ID: 23265
- Class: D
- Power: 500 watts day; 32 watts night
- Transmitter coordinates: 39°6′55″N 90°18′34″W
- Translator: 104.7 W284DN (Jerseyville)

Links
- Website: wjbmradio.com

WJBM (1480 AM) is a radio station broadcasting a country music format. It is licensed to Jerseyville, Illinois, United States. The station is owned by Chris Lorton's First Cut Media, LLC.

DJ Two Rivers Radio purchased WJBM in 2003, along with its sister station WBBA-FM, from Brown Radio Group Inc. for $320,000. WJBM broadcast an oldies format at the time of its sale.

Effective March 14, 2022, DJ Two Rivers Radio transferred the licenses of WJBM and WBBA-FM, along with the construction permit for translator W284DN, to Doug Smith's GBI Communications, LLC as settlement of a lawsuit between the two parties. GBI in turn turned over operation of the stations, which then simulcast a news/talk format, to John Scheper's Mid-Missouri Radio under a time brokerage agreement.

George Lorton's First Cut Media bought WJBM from GBI Communications for $100,000 in 2023; by then, the station had shifted to classic country. In addition to country music, the station's programming includes local news, national news from Fox News Radio, and agriculture news from the RFD Radio Network.
