= Southern Illinois =

Coordinates: 38°N 89°W

Southern Illinois Little Egypt
- Region of Illinois
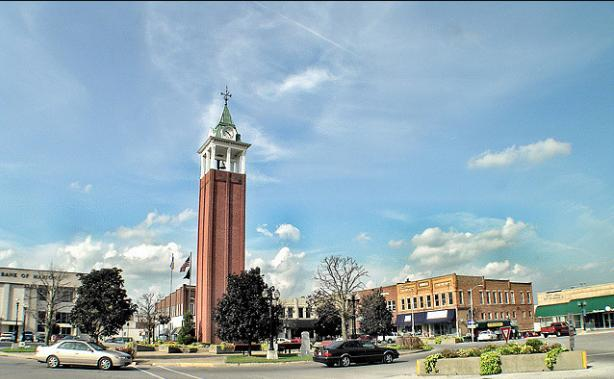
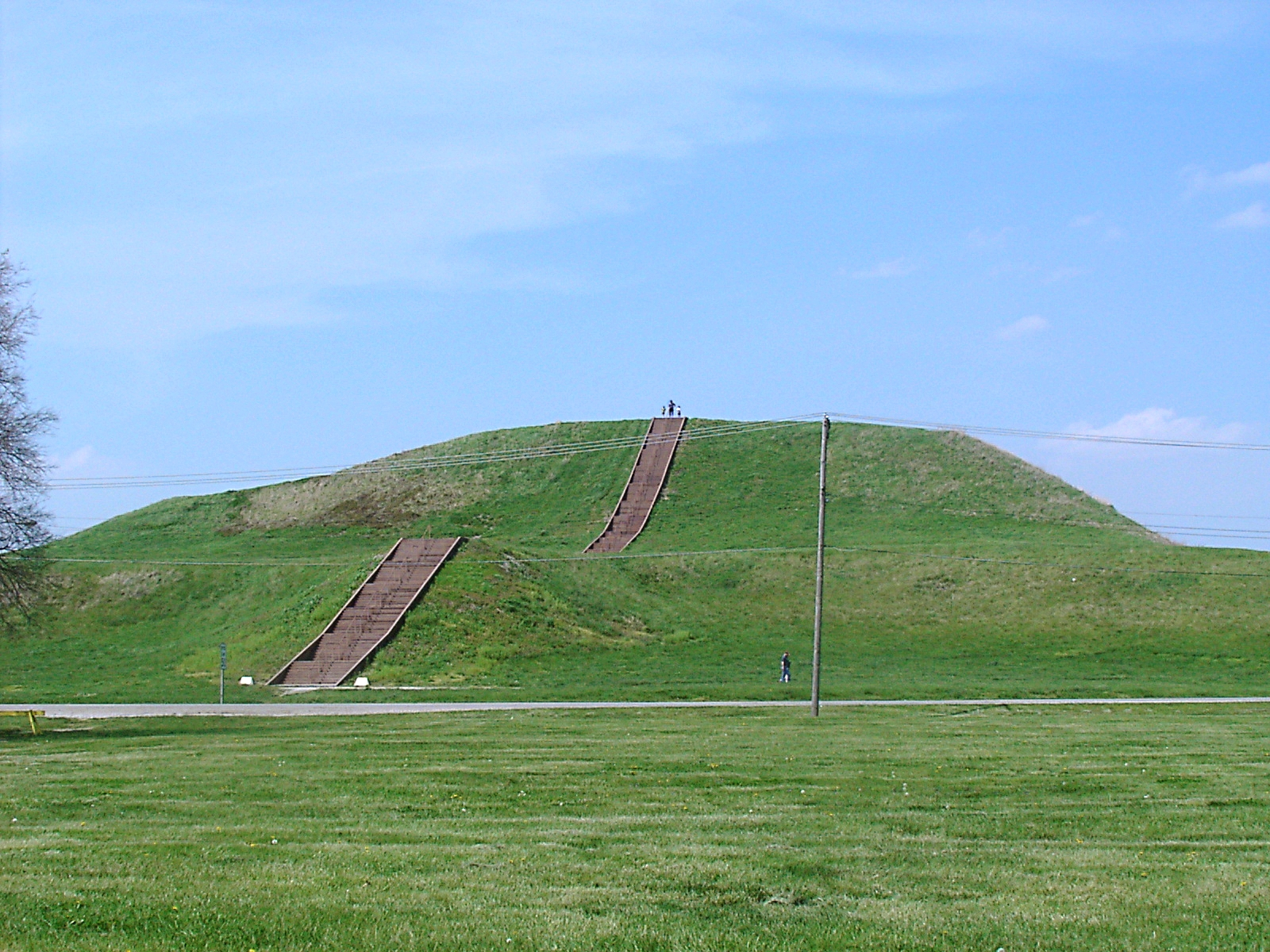
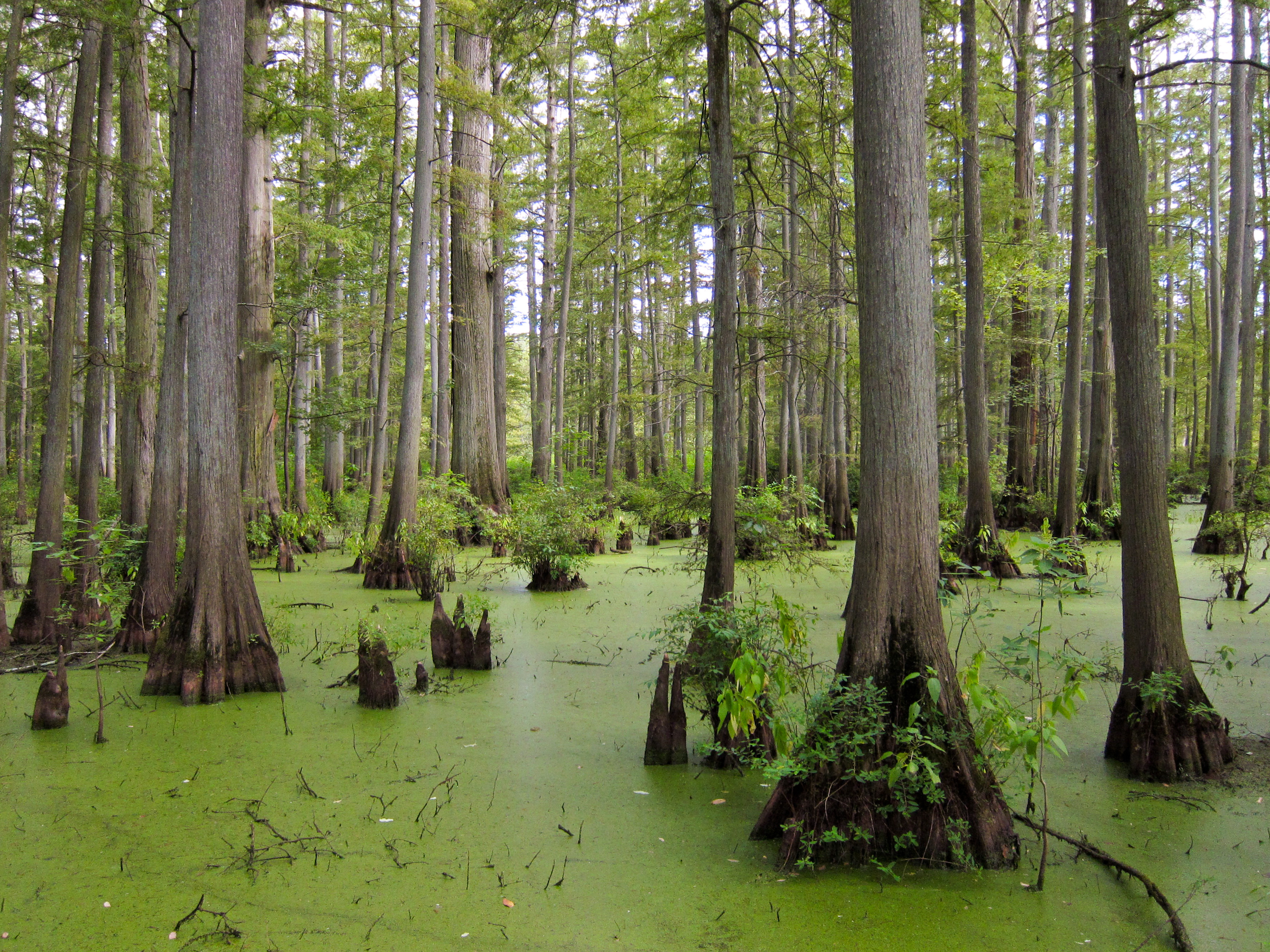
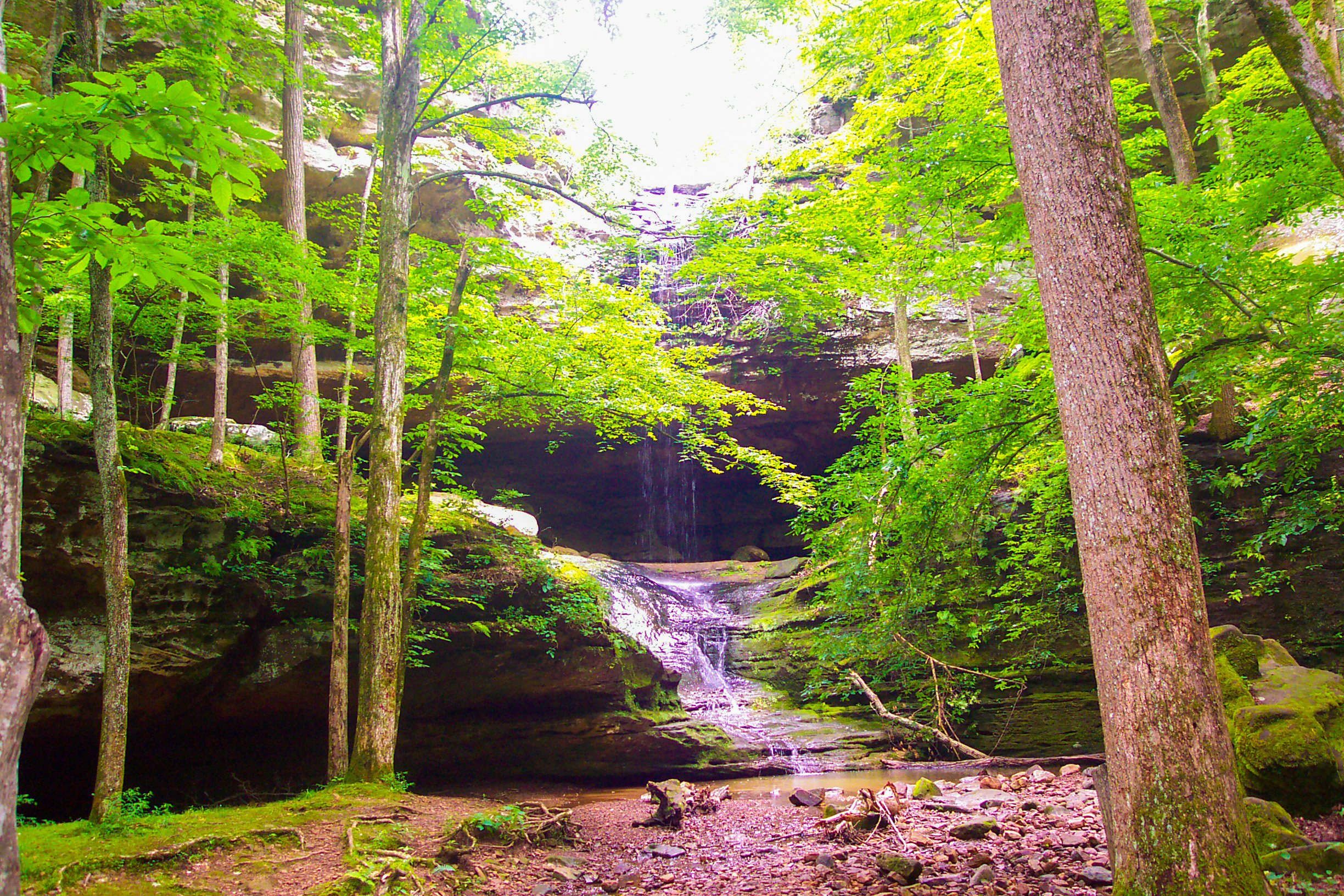
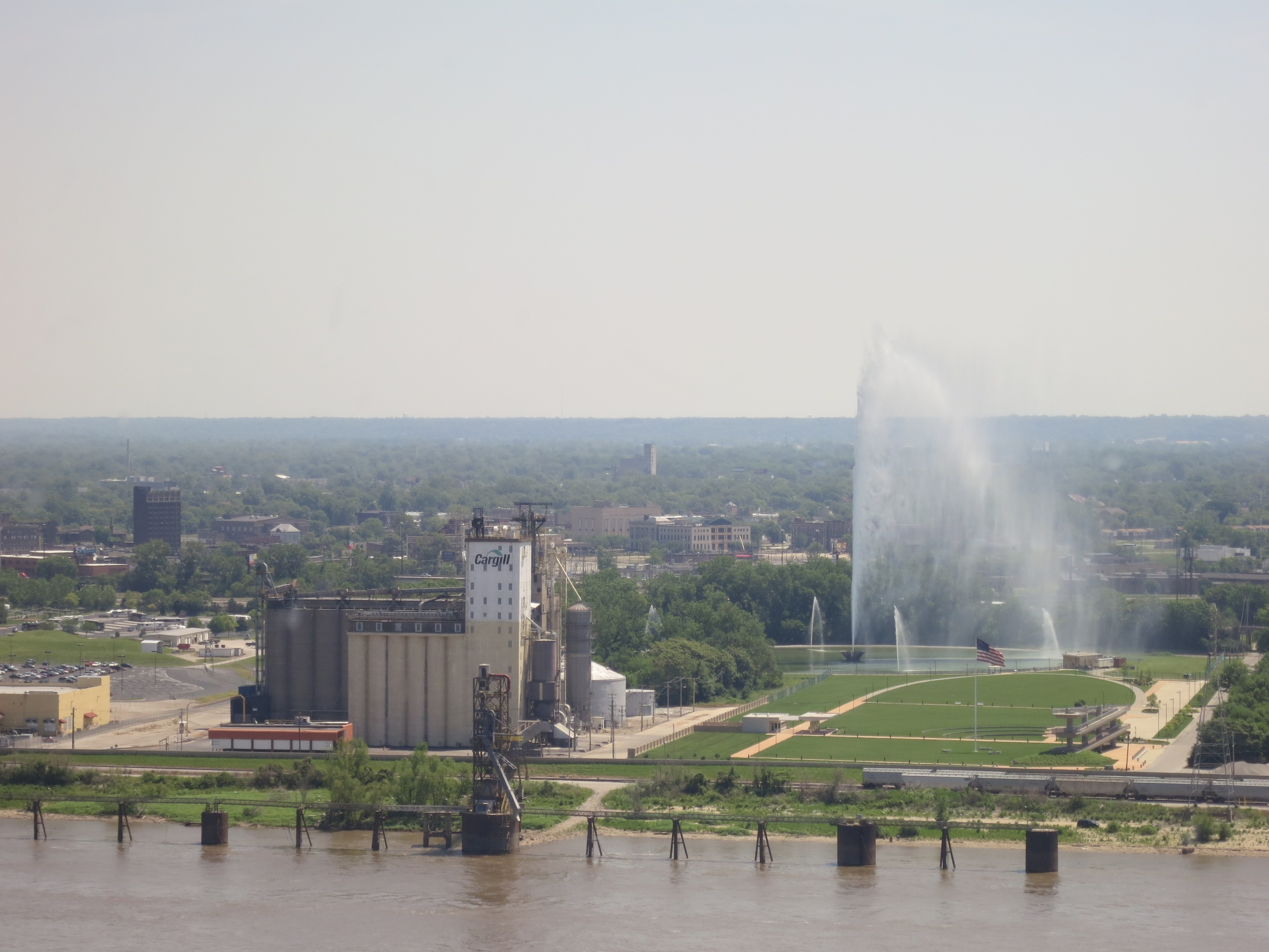
- Marion, Illinois Cairo, Illinois Monks Mound Cache River Ferne Clyffe State Park East St. Louis and Gateway Geyser

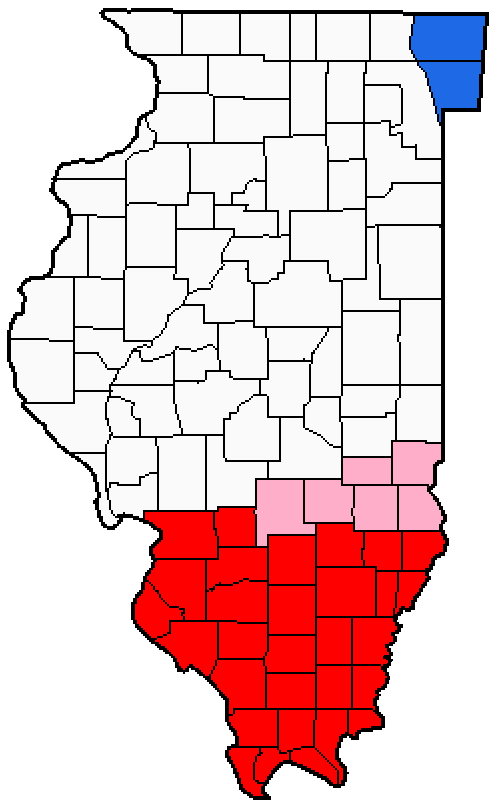
- Counties in red are usually or always included in southern Illinois, while those in pink are sometimes included.
- Country: United States
- State: Illinois
- Largest city: Belleville

Population
  - Total: 1.2 million

Southern Illinois is a region of the U.S. state of Illinois comprising the southern third of the state, principally south of Interstate 70. Part of downstate Illinois, it is bordered by the two most voluminous rivers in the United States: the Mississippi below its connection with the Missouri River to the west and the Ohio River to the east and south, with the tributary Wabash River, extending the southeastern border. Some areas of Southern Illinois are known historically as Little Egypt. Although part of the Midwest, certain areas of Southern Illinois more closely align culturally with neighboring parts of the Upland South (i.e. Kentucky, Tennessee, Southern Indiana, and Missouri).

Southern Illinois's most populated city is Belleville at 44,478. Other principal cities include Alton, Centralia, Collinsville, Edwardsville, Glen Carbon, Godfrey, Granite City, O'Fallon, Harrisburg, Herrin, West Frankfort, Mt. Vernon, Marion, and Carbondale, where the main campus of Southern Illinois University is located. Residents may also commute to St. Louis and Cape Girardeau, Missouri; Evansville, Indiana; and Paducah, Kentucky. The Southwestern region is home to Scott Air Force Base, a major military installation.

The area has a population of 1.2 million people, who live mostly in rural towns and cities separated by extensive farmland and the Shawnee National Forest. The two higher density areas of population are Metro East St. Louis/Southwestern Illinois (pop. 700,000+), which is the partly industrialized Illinois portion of the St. Louis Metropolitan Area, and the Southern Illinois Region of Carbondale–Marion–Herrin, Illinois Combined Statistical Area, centered on Carbondale and Marion, a two-county area that is home to 123,272 residents.

The first European settlers were French colonists in the part of their North American territory called Illinois Country. Later settlers migrated from the Upland South of the United States, traveling by the Ohio River. The region was affiliated with the southern plantation economy and rural culture. Some settlers owned slaves before the territory was organized and slavery was prohibited. Many areas developed an economy based on coal mining.

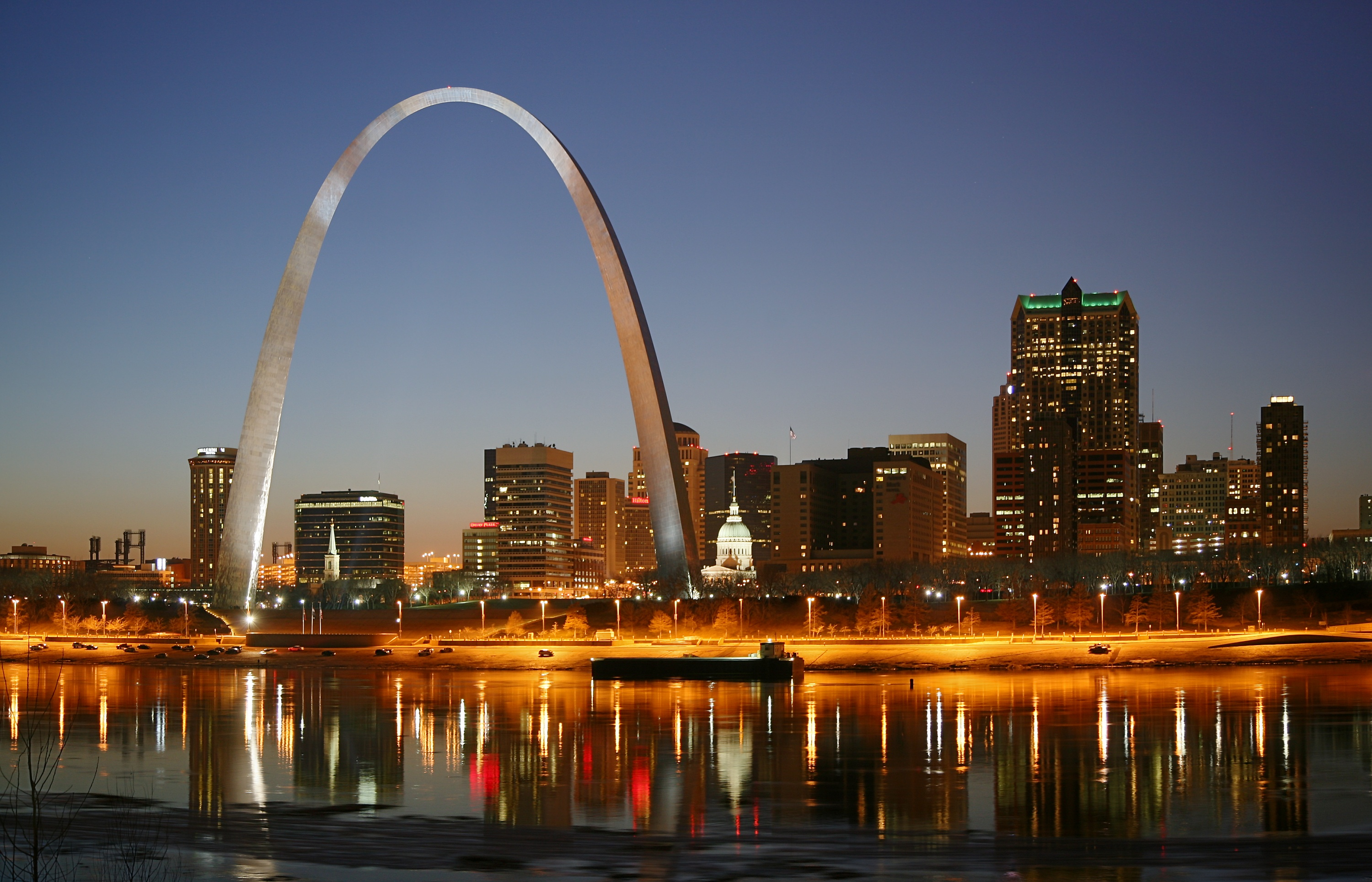
St. Louis, Missouri metropolitan area extends into Illinois, giving Southern Illinois its most populated region known as Metro East

== History ==
=== Early history ===
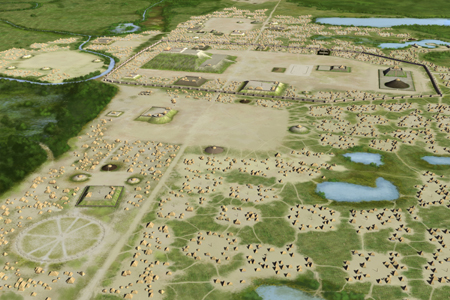
An artist's recreation of central Cahokia near East St Louis in St Clair County

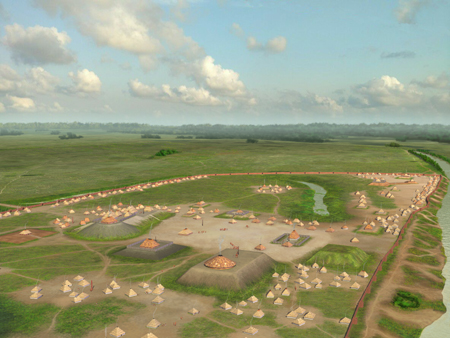
An artist's representation of the Kincaid Site on the Ohio River in Massac County, as it may have looked during its peak

The earliest inhabitants of Illinois are thought to have arrived about 12,000 BC. They were indigenous hunter-gatherers, but they also developed their own system of agriculture. After AD 1000, the production of agricultural surpluses resulted in the development of complex, hierarchical societies. With the rise of the Mississippian culture in the Mississippi and Ohio River valleys, tribal leaders organized thousands of workers to build complex urban areas featuring numerous large earthworks – pyramidal, ridgetop and conical mounds used for religious, political and ceremonial purposes.

Cahokia, located within the boundaries of present-day Collinsville, Illinois, was the major regional center of this culture. It contains the largest prehistoric earthworks in the Americas, and has been designated as a UNESCO World Heritage Site. The mound builders' culture seems to have collapsed between 1400 and 1500 AD. The Mississippians had abandoned Cahokia long before the first European explorers arrived.

The Illinois tribes, for whom the state is named, and other historic tribes migrated to southern Illinois around AD 1500. Archaeologists say they were not descendants of the earlier inhabitants; they spoke an Algonquian language of Miami-Illini, shared in dialects among neighboring regional tribes. They had likely migrated from eastern areas, where Algonquian-speaking tribes emerged along the Atlantic Coast and waterways. The Illini left numerous artifacts, including burial sites, burned-out campfires along the bases of bluffs, pottery, flint implements, and weapons. Structures built by them include stone forts or "pounds". Visitors can see a stone fort in Giant City State Park near Makanda. At least eight other such structures are known in the region.

=== Illinois Country ===
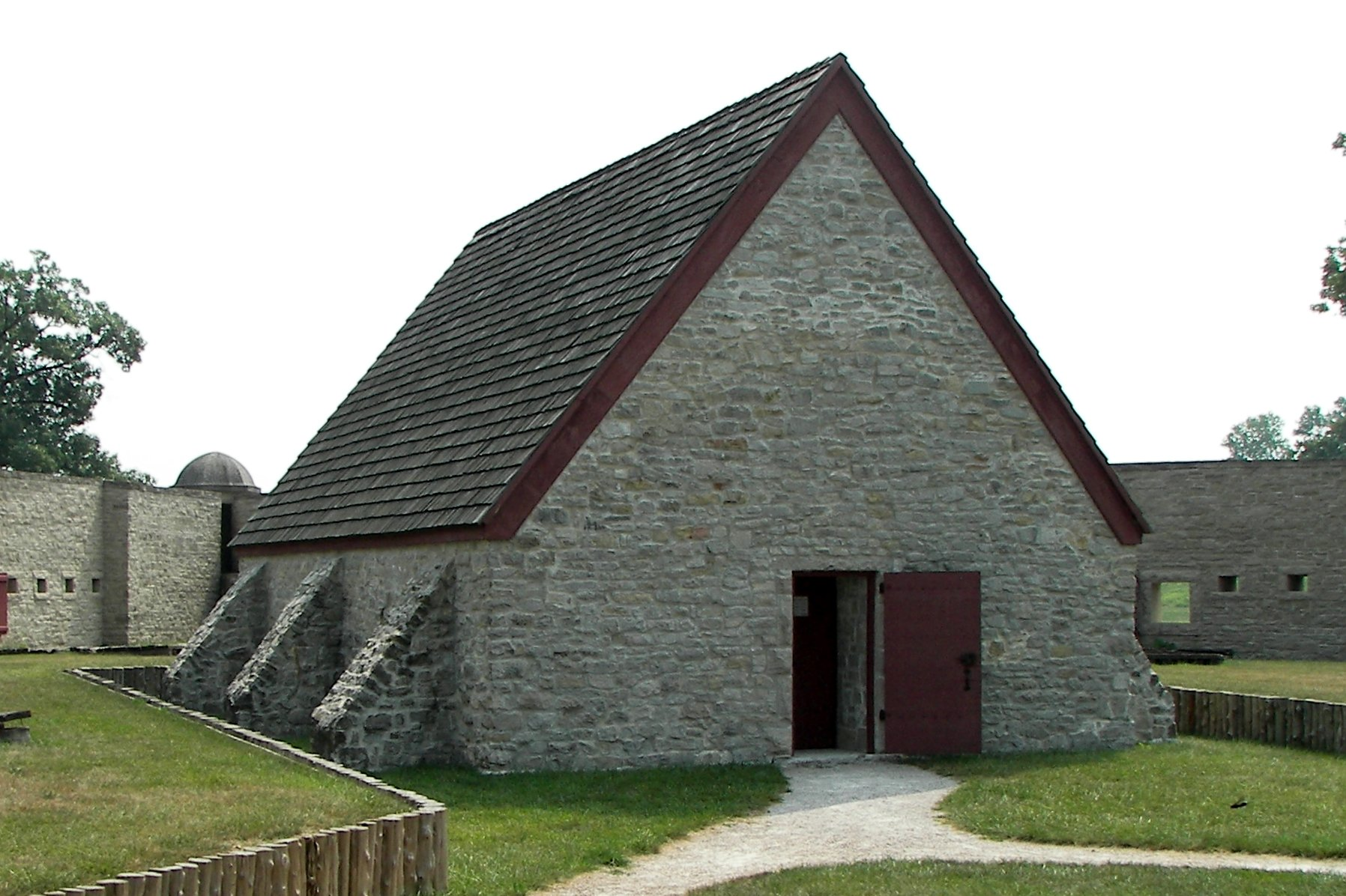
The French Fort de Chartres' powder magazine, restored, is thought to be the oldest standing building in Illinois. Made of limestone in 1756.

In about 1673, French explorers from Quebec became the first Europeans to reach Illinois. The French named the area Illinois after the Indians who had greeted them. The French explored the Mississippi River, establishing outposts and seeking a route to the Pacific Ocean and the Far East. As increasing Indian unrest and warfare began in Northern Illinois over the lucrative fur trade along the Great Lakes, the French concentrated on building outposts in Southern Illinois.

The earliest European settlers were concentrated along the Mississippi, Ohio, and Wabash rivers, which provided easy routes for travel and trade. The settlements including Cahokia town, Kaskaskia and Chartres became important market villages and supply depots between Canada and the French ports on the lower Mississippi River. Other important early outposts in Southern Illinois were at Old Shawneetown and Fort Massac on the Ohio River.

After defeating the French in the French and Indian War (Seven Years' War) and signing the Treaty of Paris in 1763, the English ruled the Great Lakes region. At the time, many French settlers moved from towns on the eastern side of the Mississippi to the western side, which was ruled by Spain after the war. It took over all the Louisiana Territory west of the river. During the American Revolutionary War, the Southern Illinois area was the scene of the best known campaign in what was then the American west, when Virginians sought to occupy it against the British.

=== American settlers ===
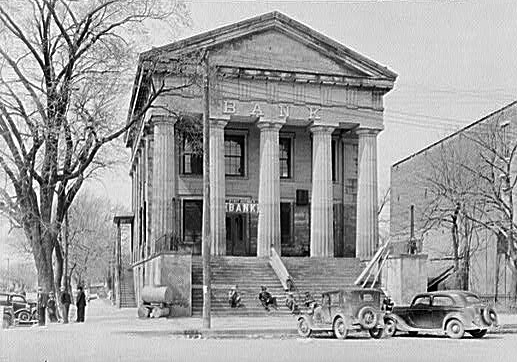
The Bank of Illinois in Shawneetown, built in 1839–1841, shown in 1937

European-American settlers were slow to arrive in Illinois after the United States victory in the American Revolutionary War. By 1800, fewer than 2,000 European Americans lived in Illinois. Soon more settlers came from the backwoods areas of Kentucky, Tennessee, Virginia, Georgia, and the Carolinas. They were mostly of English, German, and Scots-Irish descent.

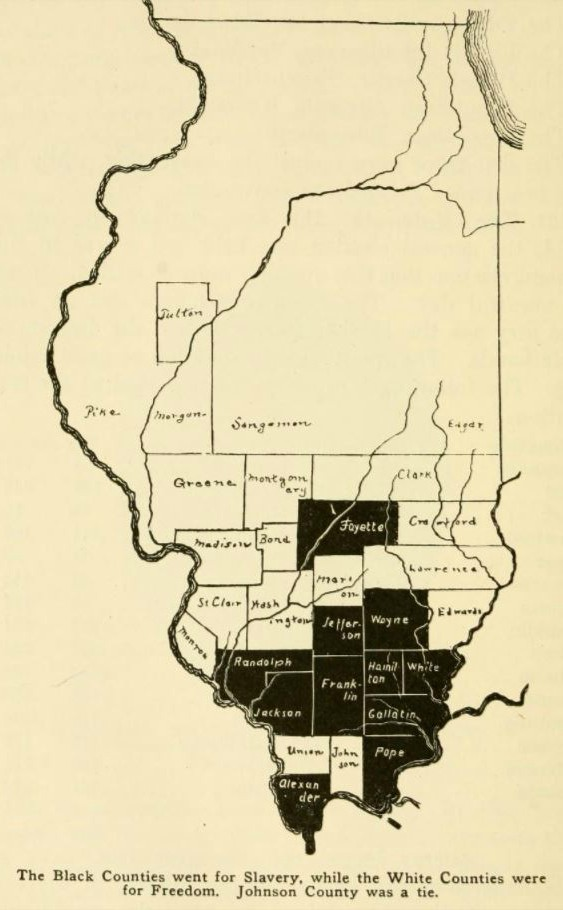
The majority of Illinois voters in 1824 rejected a proposal for a new constitutional convention that could have made slavery legal outright. A map of Illinois free and slave counties in 1824 showing shaded counties that were favorable to legalizing slavery in Illinois

In 1787, the federal government included Illinois in the Northwest Territory, an unorganized area that included present-day Ohio, Indiana, Michigan, and Wisconsin. Slavery was prohibited in this area, but for some time, slaveholders already in the area were allowed to keep their chattel property. As the areas became more populated with European Americans, they could be admitted as states to the Union. Illinois became a part of the Indiana Territory in 1800. Illinois settlers wanted more control over their own affairs and Illinois became a separate territory in 1809. It was admitted as a free state in 1818. In late 1811 and early 1812, the New Madrid earthquakes struck the region as one of the largest successions of earthquakes, including the most intensive ever inferred (not recorded) in the contiguous United States.

The first bank to be chartered in Illinois was located at Old Shawneetown in 1816. The first building used solely to house a bank in Illinois was built in 1840 in Old Shawneetown and was used until the 1920s. The Old Shawneetown State Bank has been restored as an historical site. Crops of cotton and tobacco were grown in the extreme southern region of Illinois. Cotton was grown mostly for the home weaver, but during the Civil War, cotton was also grown for export, as the regular supply of cotton from the South was not available. Enough tobacco was grown to make it a profitable crop for export. Both crops have been succeeded by other agricultural commodities.

=== 19th century turbulence ===
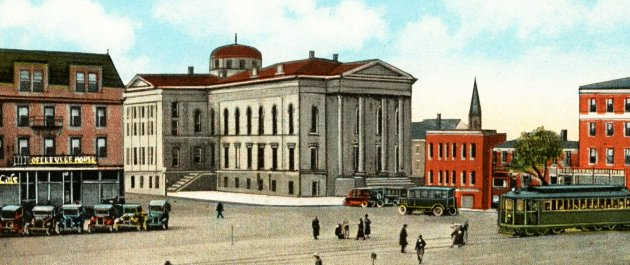
Belleville around the start of the 20th century.

A feud between families in Williamson County, called the Bloody Vendetta, lasted nearly ten years and took many lives. In all, 495 assaults with a deadly weapon were committed and 285 murders took place in Williamson County between 1839 and 1876.

In 1858, Abraham Lincoln ran for the U.S. Senate against incumbent Stephen A. Douglas. A series of debates were held in seven towns in Illinois, including Jonesboro and Alton. Many of the people living in Southern Illinois were first- or second-generation white Southerners. Many of these families had left the slave South to escape the economic institution of slavery despite retaining its racial ideologies.

Cairo, Illinois, at the southern tip where the Ohio River joins the Mississippi, grew to considerable commercial importance. On either bank of the rivers were states which, despite remaining loyal to the national government throughout the secession crisis, had numerous residents who, for reasons predominately rooted in racial ideologies, were sympathetic to the Southern rebellion (1860–65). Some prominent Southern Illinoisans were active in the Knights of the Golden Circle, which proposed a southern pan-Caribbean confederation of slaveholding states and nations.

The outbreak of the American Civil War exacerbated sectional tensions in the region. While the vast majority of Southern Illinoisans who served did so as U.S. volunteers, 34 men from the counties of Williamson and Jackson traveled to western Tennessee to enlist within Company G of the 15th Tennessee Volunteer Infantry. Far more served in the ranks of U.S. regiments like the 31st Illinois Volunteer Infantry, commanded by famed Southern Illinoisan John A. Logan, or 111th Illinois Volunteer Infantry, both of which were composed exclusively of Southern Illinoisans. Ulysses S Grant was commander of the District of Cairo when U.S. forces staged expeditions into the border states of Missouri and Kentucky, and the Confederate states of Tennessee and Mississippi. Despite the Southern roots of many Southern Illinoisans, 40% of eligible Southern Illinois men joined the Union Army, compared to 28% in the rest of the state.

=== 20th century ===
Coal mining became an important industry in Southern Illinois around the start of the 20th century, with cities such as Harrisburg prospering, having a population of 16,000 people during the 1920s. Union miners all over the nation went on strike in 1922; during this period, 24 men were killed during a riot in Herrin, in Williamson County. It was called the Herrin Massacre, and the county was known as Bloody Williamson for years to come.

The Shelton Brothers Gang and Charles Birger gangs operated in Southern Illinois in the 1920s during Prohibition. Shoot-outs between these and other rival gangsters and with law enforcement officers were common. After being convicted of ordering the murder of the mayor of West City, the leader of the Birger gang, Charlie Birger, was hanged in 1928. In 1925 the Tri-State Tornado was the deadliest on record, devastating the city of Murphysboro and killing 234 people, the most in a single city in U.S. history.

The Wall Street Crash of 1929 and the Great Depression of the 1930s caused coal miners to lose their jobs as most mines closed. Farmers could not sell their crops and lost their land; families defaulted on home mortgage loans; and young people from the region began leaving for the cities to find work. After World War II, employment started to rise within the region, but unemployment continued to be a problem for the rural region for decades afterward.

When the Clean Air Act of 1990 required many utility companies in the United States to switch to low-sulfur coal for the health of the nation, lacking affordable technology to clean the coal, the Southern Illinois region lost markets and the economy suffered. However, demand for high-sulfur coal mined in the region has rebounded in the 2010s. Agriculture has since become the main economic driver for the Southern Illinois region.

Southern Illinois is gaining a cultural identity apart from its neighbors, as previously-dispersed rural populations become more concentrated around the cities of Marion and Belleville. Marion has grown since 1970 and in the process has been selected for Illinois's first STAR Bonds District for the Millennium Development, a project designed for a city ten times its size.

Populations among the smaller cities and towns have dropped as people moved to the Carbondale-Herrin-Marion combined statistical area and Metro East.

=== Origin of "Little Egypt" name ===
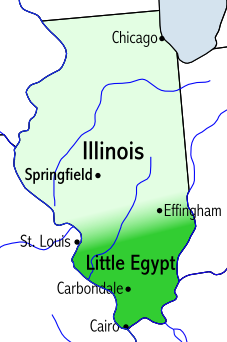
Southern Illinois is also known as "Little Egypt".

In 1799, Baptist minister John Badgley dubbed the fertile highlands and bottoms near Edwardsville the "Land of Goshen". Early Edwardsville was known as Goshen, a biblical reference to Ancient Egypt. Geographic features such as the Mississippi and its flood plains were like the fertile Nile Valley. The Indian mounds of the area were large at the time and seemed like the pyramids of Egypt. The nickname stuck, and it was reinforced by other events.

In the 1830s, poor harvests in the north of the state drove people to Southern Illinois to buy grain. Others say it was because the land of the great Mississippi and Ohio River valleys were like that of Egypt's Nile Delta. According to Hubbs, the nickname dates back to 1818, when a huge tract of land was purchased at the confluence of the rivers and its developers named it Cairo /ˈkɛəroʊ/. Today, the town of Cairo still stands on the peninsula where the Ohio River joins the Mississippi.

Other settlements in the area were also given names with Egyptian, Greek, or Middle Eastern origins: The Southern Illinois University Salukis sports teams and towns such as Metropolis, Thebes, Dongola, Palestine, Lebanon, New Athens, Sparta, and Karnak show the influence of classical culture. Greek names were also related to the contemporary national pride in the new republic of the early 19th century, and were given to towns throughout the Midwest.

Although Illinois was a free state before the American Civil War, some residents in the area known as Egypt still owned slaves. Illinois law generally forbade bringing slaves into Illinois, but a special exemption was given to the salt works near Equality. In addition, an exception was made for slaveholders who held long-term indentured servants or descendants of slaves in the area before it achieved statehood.

The Underground Railroad also operated in southern Illinois, moving nearly equally northward and southward with bounties available for returned slaves appealing to the residents there. Slaves were going to "Canaan", the land of milk and honey, for which at first glance Egypt would be an easy mistake. Directions to Underground Railroad travelers were coded in Bible verses or songs, and the story of Moses fleeing Egypt was certainly used as an analog to their own plight. Egypt was the land to escape, and central Illinois represented the biblical Canaan, with Egypt being a treacherous southern Illinois.

The nicknames for this region also arose from the political tensions of the American Civil War period, as regions of the state allied differently with North and South. Because southern Illinois was settled by Southerners, they maintained a sympathy for many issues of their former home states. They supported the continuation of slavery and voted for Democrats at a time when the northern part of the state supported Republicans. The meaning is expressed in this description of the 1858 campaign of Douglas and Abraham Lincoln:

In 1858, debating in northern Illinois, Douglas had threatened Lincoln by asserting that he would "trot him down to Egypt" and there challenge him to repeat his antislavery views before a hostile crowd. The audience understood Douglas: overwhelming proslavery sentiment and Democratic unanimity in Egypt had led to the nickname.

In the fall of 1861, Democrats took a majority of seats in the state legislature. They worked to pass provisions of a new constitution, an initiative begun in 1860. They proposed reapportionment so the southern region's less populous counties would have representation equal to those in the north, which was growing more rapidly. Northern Illinois residents worried about the state coming under the political will of the southern minority. "Shall the manufacturing, agricultural and commercial interests of northern Illinois be put into Egyptian bondage?" wondered the Aurora Beacon. When Lincoln commissioned the Southern Illinois Democrat John Alexander McClernand as a brigadier general, he told him to "keep Egypt right side up".

Southern Illinois had become the center of the Knights of the Golden Circle, a secret group devoted to supporting the Confederacy. With concern rising about armed southern sympathizers, in August 1862, U.S. Marshal David Phillips arrested several Democrats who allegedly belonged to the Knights, including men in respectable positions: Congressmen, state representatives, and judges. One was Circuit Judge Andrew Duff. They were sent to Washington, D.C., where they were held for 68 days before release, but they were never charged. Democrats won across the state in the fall election.

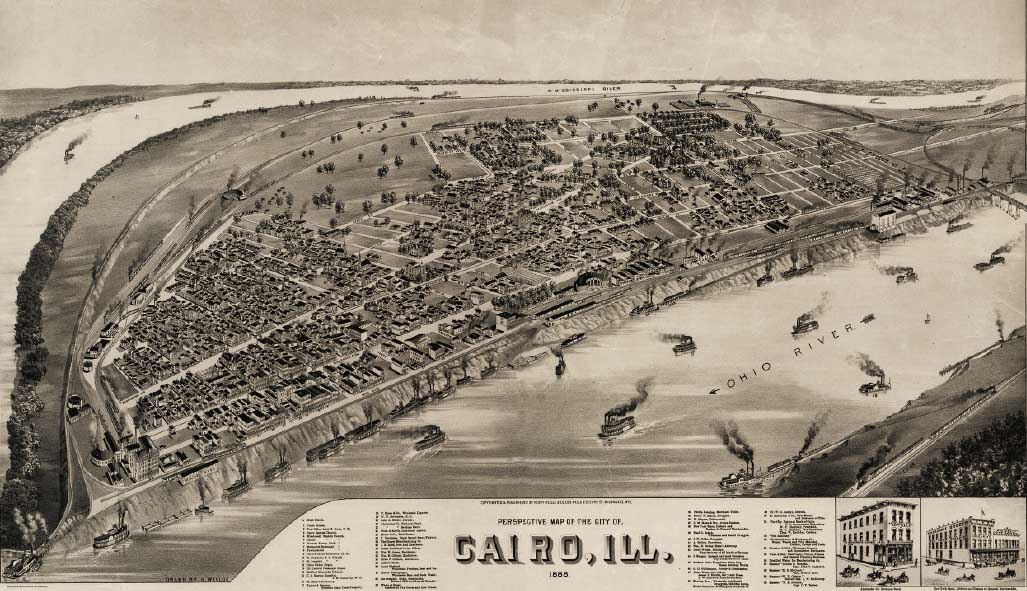
A panoramic map of Cairo, 1885. The city sits between two rivers, reminding early settlers of the Egyptian Delta.

After the war, other reasons were proposed for the nickname. Political divisions continued in the state. In the later 19th century, the central and southern agricultural areas joined the Populist Movement. Chicago and the industrial North aligned with similar areas and continued as predominantly Republican into the 20th century.

In 1871 Judge Andrew Duff wrote an article in which he ignored the war years and preceding political divisions. He claimed the name of Egypt related to Southern Illinois's role in supplying grain to northern and central Illinois following the "Winter of the Deep Snow" in 1830–31. Following a long winter and late spring, Upper Illinois lost much of its harvest in an early September frost. Southern Illinois's weather gave it good crops, so it could ship grain and corn north. The nickname supposedly arose from similarities of the events to the Bible story of Jacob's sons going to Egypt for grain to survive a famine. The nickname persisted through the 1890s, when, according to progressive journalist and Toledo mayor Brand Whitlock, members of the Illinois General Assembly whose districts lay south of the O&M Railway were called "Egyptians".

Belly dancer Farida Mazar Spyropoulos's appearance as "Little Egypt" at the 1893 World's Columbian Exposition in Chicago brought notoriety to the name, but she had no connection to the Illinois region. Other dancers took up the stage name which popularized it further in the early 20th century.

One of the earliest uses of the phrase "Little Egypt" is found in the Troy Weekly Call of Troy, Illinois, in 1912. A state news brief was headlined "Two New Little Egypt Pastors", about two new Presbyterian pastors about to be installed at Brookport and Salem, Illinois. The Chicago Tribune appears to have first used the phrase "Little Egypt" in reference to Southern Illinois on April 25, 1920 in an article about fruit grown in the region. The title character in the comic strip Moon Mullins had a girlfriend named Little Egypt. The strip's creator, Frank Willard, was a native of Anna and Southern Illinois.

== Microregions ==
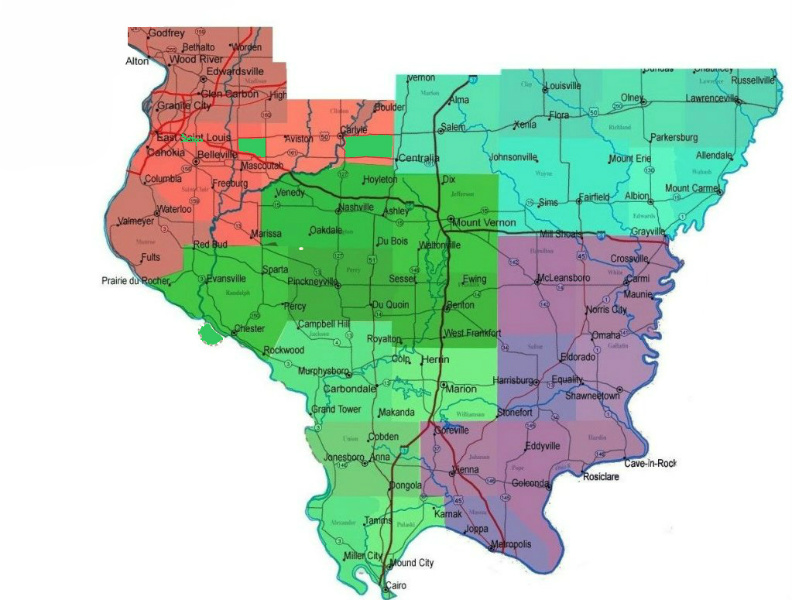
Southern Illinois, showing the Metro East region in red, East Central Southern Illinois in teal, West Central Southern Illinois in dark green, Southwest Illinois in light green, and Southeastern Illinois in purple.

=== Northern boundary ===
"Southern Illinois" is not a formal geographic designation and definitions of what constitutes Southern Illinois vary. Many Southern Illinois residents consider the area along and south of Interstate 70 as the dividing line between the Central and Southern parts of the state. The geography of Illinois becomes gradually hillier as one travels farther South. One can see this driving south along Interstate 57.

=== Metro East ===
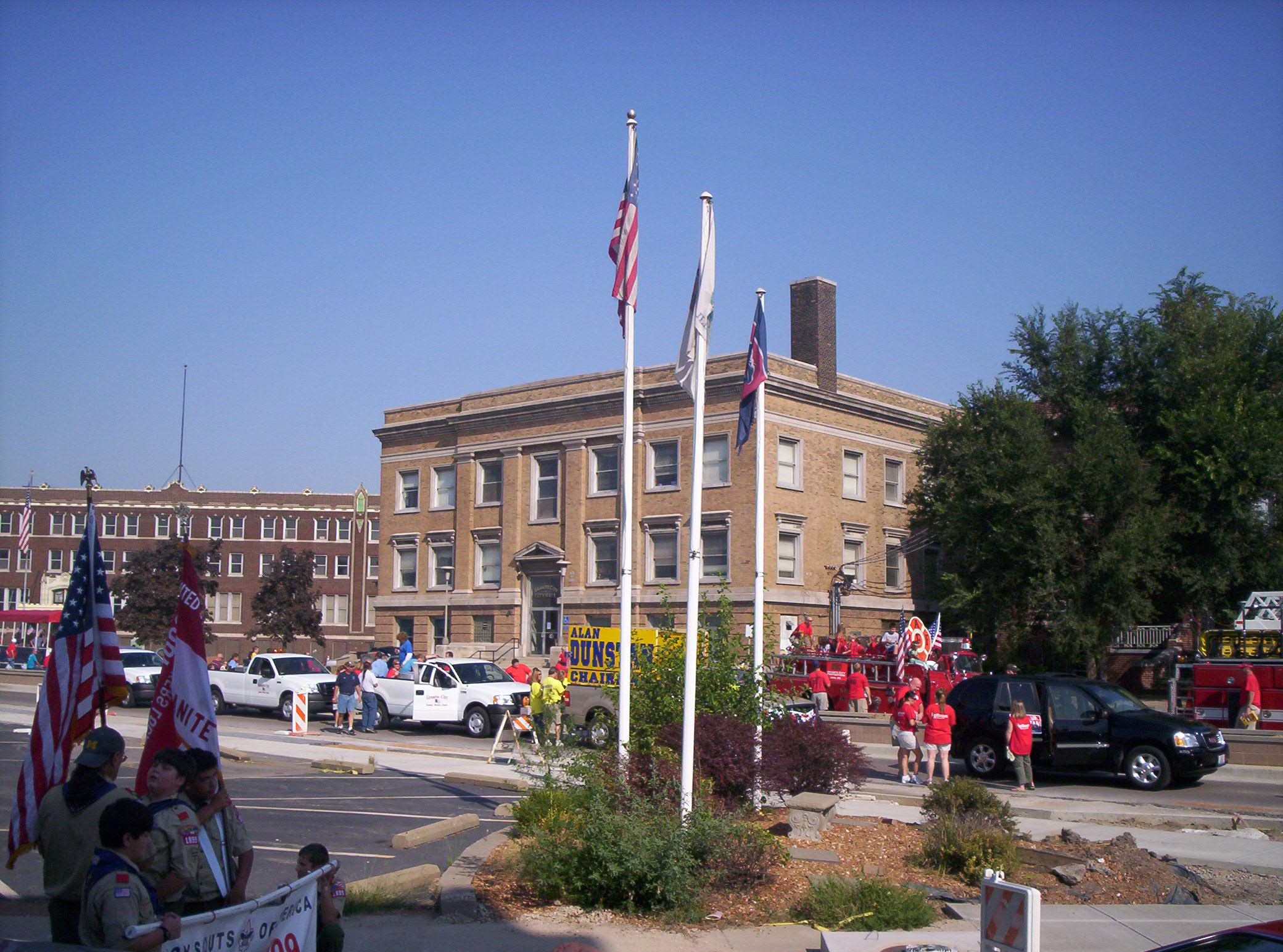
Granite City downtown and city hall, population 27,549.

The most populous region of Southern Illinois is the Illinois side of the St. Louis Metropolitan Statistical Area. Noted areas are Cahokia Mounds, the American Bottom, and East St. Louis, which has had a turbulent history related to industrialization and labor, immigration and the struggle for equal rights.

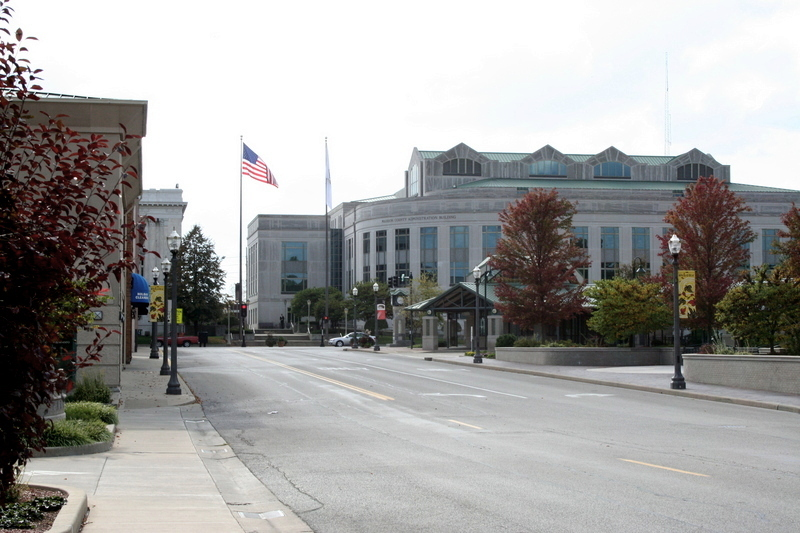
Edwardsville, Illinois, Population 26,808.

- Population: 702,579

Counties

- Clinton
- Madison
- Monroe
- St. Clair
- Bond
- Jersey
- Calhoun

Principal cities

- Belleville (St. Clair)
- Alton (Madison)
- Granite City (Madison)
- O'Fallon (St. Clair)
- East St. Louis (St. Clair)
- Collinsville (Madison)
- Edwardsville (Madison)

City populations

- 41,256
- 25,676
- 27,549
- 32,289
- 26,359
- 24,366
- 26,808

=== East-Central Southern Illinois (Wabash Valley) ===
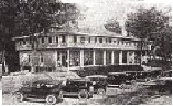
The Grand Rapids Hotel Mount Carmel, Illinois on opening day in 1922

Located on the Wabash River, East-Central Southern Illinois is noted by the town of Salem, the birthplace of William Jennings Bryan, the G. I. Bill of Rights and Miracle Whip salad dressing.

- Population: 155,988

Counties

- Marion
- Clay
- Lawrence
- Richland
- Wayne
- Edwards
- Wabash

Principal cities

- Centralia (multiple counties)
- Olney (Richland)
- Salem (Marion)
- Mount Carmel (Wabash)
- Fairfield (Wayne)
- Flora (Clay)

City populations

- 13,032
- 9,115
- 7,485
- 7,284
- 5,154
- 5,070
- 12,604

=== West-Central Southern Illinois ===
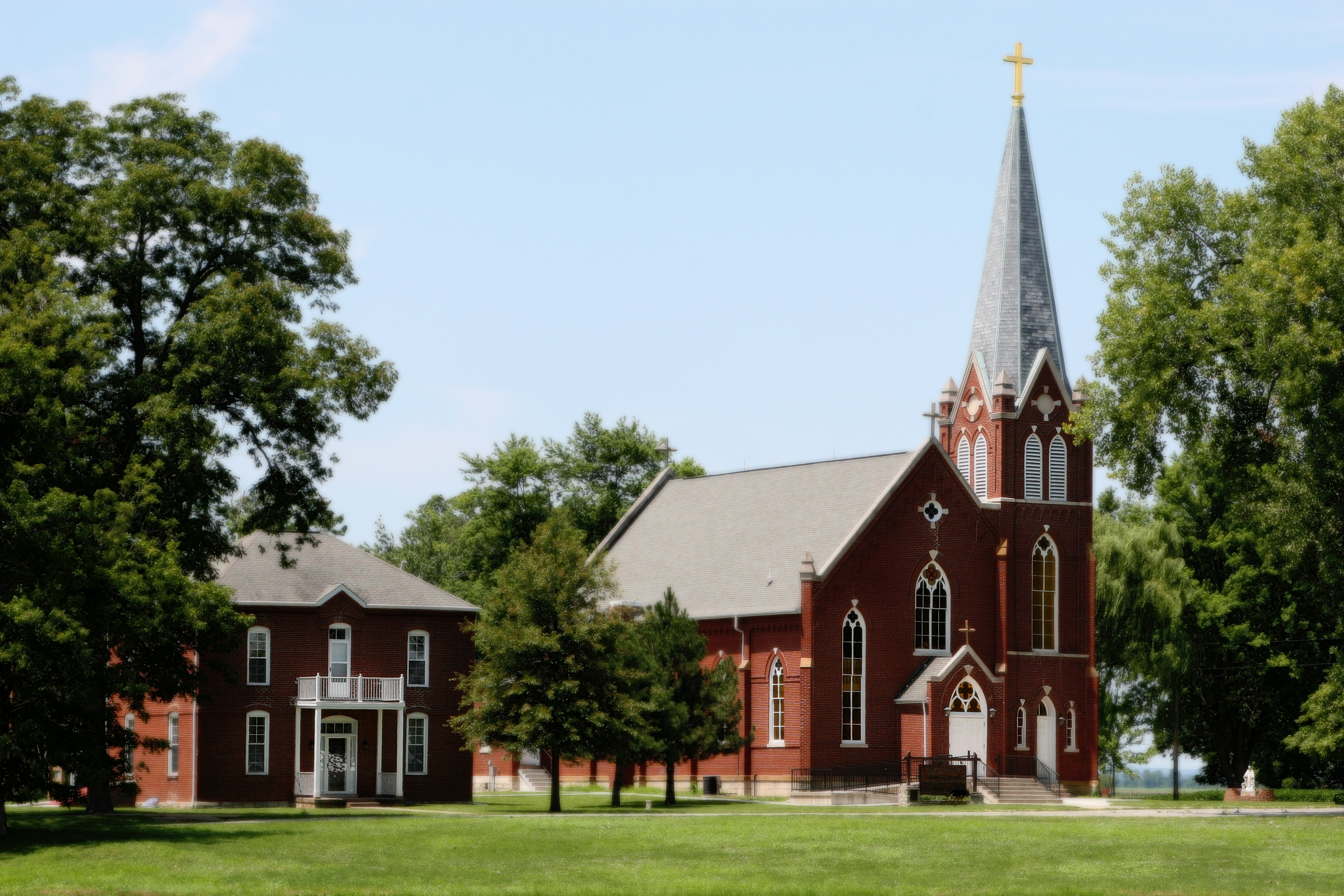
Catholic Church in Kaskaskia

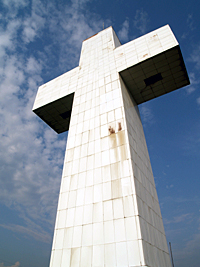
Bald Knob Cross rises 111 feet above the Shawnee National Forest west of Alto Pass, Illinois

Chester, in West-Central Southern Illinois is noted as the "Home of Popeye". Kaskaskia, the first state capital of Illinois is located near the Mississippi River. This area also contains the ending point of the Kaskaskia River near the Fort Kaskaskia State Historic Site. Rend Lake is located in this area.

- Population: 148,930

Counties

- Franklin
- Perry
- Randolph
- Jefferson
- Washington

Principal cities

- Mount Vernon (Jefferson)
- Chester (Randolph)
- West Frankfort (Franklin)
- Benton (Franklin)
- Du Quoin (Perry)
- Pinckneyville (Perry)
- Nashville (Washington)

City populations

- 15,277
- 8,586
- 8,182
- 7,087
- 6,109
- 5,648
- 3,258

=== Southwest Illinois ===
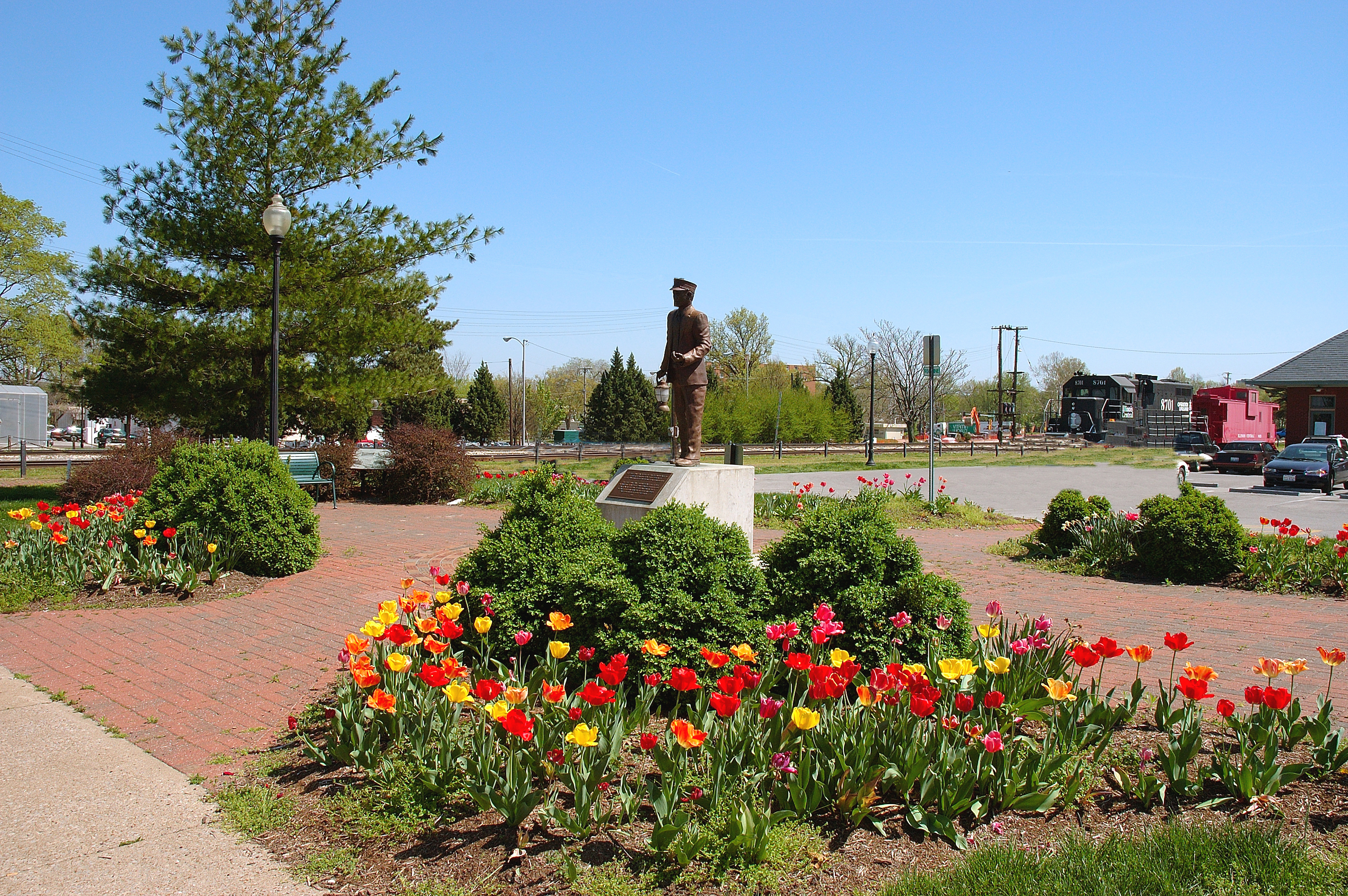
A statue in Carbondale.

Located within the western reaches of the Cache River, Southwest Illinois is the second most populated region. The region's most notable institution is the main campus of Southern Illinois University in Carbondale, winner of the 1971 All-America City Award, finalist in the 2009 contest, and the fastest growing city in Southern Illinois outside the Metro East, Marion, Illinois.

Both cities are centered in the Carbondale-Marion-Herrin, Illinois Combined Statistical Area, home to 123,272 residents. In the southern reaches of the region Alto Pass and Bald Knob Cross are located near the orchards. The large Crab Orchard lake is the largest in the region. Historic Cairo sits at the far southern end near the confluence of the Ohio and Mississippi Rivers.

- Population: 158,782

Counties

- Jackson
- Williamson
- Union
- Alexander
- Pulaski

Principal cities

- Carbondale (Jackson)
- Marion (Williamson)
- Herrin (Williamson)
- Murphysboro (Jackson)
- Anna/Jonesboro (Union)
- Carterville (Williamson)
- Cairo (Alexander)

City populations

- 26,241
- 17,315
- 12,696
- 7,970
- 6,295
- 5,589
- 2,831

=== Southeastern Illinois ===
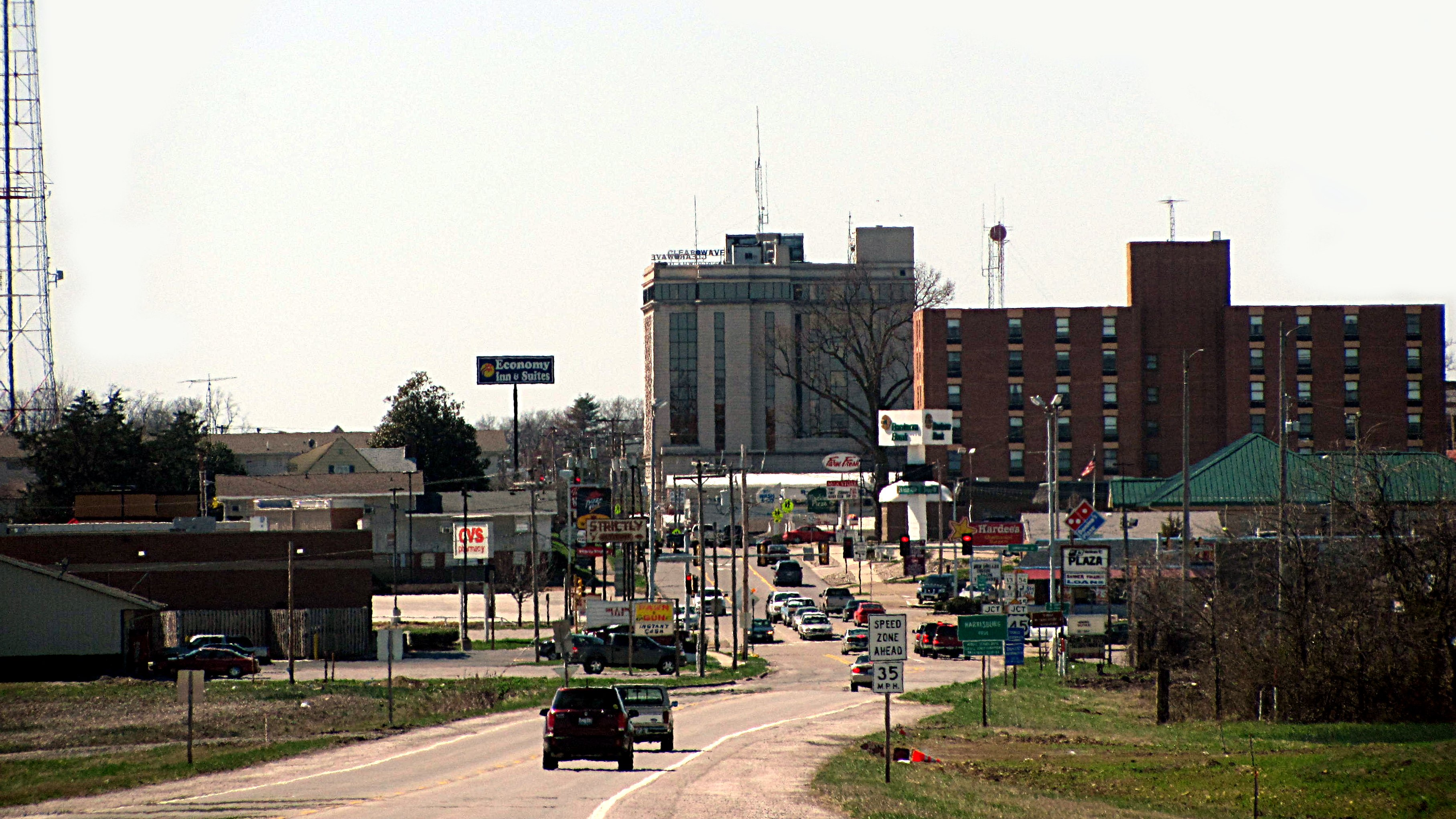
The Harrisburg skyline. Harrisburg prospered with one of the largest Southern Illinois downtown districts during the 1920s and had a population of nearly 16,000 people. Today it has a population of about 9,000.

The least populated region, Southeastern Illinois is marked by being within the Shawnee Hills and the Shawnee National Forest. The area includes many state parks and Garden of the Gods Wilderness. The historic town of Shawneetown is located on the Ohio River which is the eastern border of the region.

The northern reaches of Southeastern Illinois include the Harrisburg Coal field, which are roughly 200 square miles (500 km^{2}) of abandoned coal mines dating to around the start of the 20th century near Harrisburg, Illinois, the largest city in the Southeastern Illinois area. The Saline River forks through the region as well.

- Population: 90,425

Counties

- Gallatin
- Hamilton
- Hardin
- Johnson
- Massac
- Pope
- Saline
- White

Principal cities

- Harrisburg (Saline)
- Eldorado (Saline)
- Metropolis (Massac)
- Carmi (White)
- McLeansboro (Hamilton)
- Carrier Mills (Saline)
- Vienna (Johnson)

City populations

- 9,034
- 4,122
- 6,570
- 5,240
- 2,883
- 1,653
- 1,434

== Television and radio ==
Southern Illinois is home to a variety of television and radio sources. The primary news station is WSIL-TV 3 operating out of Crainville, Illinois. The region is also home to WSIU-TV channel 8 in Carbondale Illinois. Some Southern Illinois radio stations are run off of River Radio who operates 101.5 WCIL-FM, WCIL-AM 1020, 95.1 Steve FM, New Country Z-100, and WJPF. Withers Broadcasting and Dana Communications operate sixteen radio stations in Southern Illinois including WMIX-FM 94.1 in Mt. Vernon and WDDD-FM 107.3 in the Marion-Carbondale area. Viewers also tune in to KFVS-TV 12 out of Cape Girardeau, Missouri, and WPSD-TV 6 operating in Paducah, Kentucky.

== Geography ==
Illinois has been partially covered at times by continental ice sheets. Specifically, Southern Illinois was only partially covered by continental ice sheet during the Illinoian Stage and not at all during the Wisconsin Stage. Thus, the geography of Southern Illinois is considerably more hilly and rocky than central or northern Illinois. Areas of Southern Illinois are more similar to the Ozarks than to central or northern Illinois.

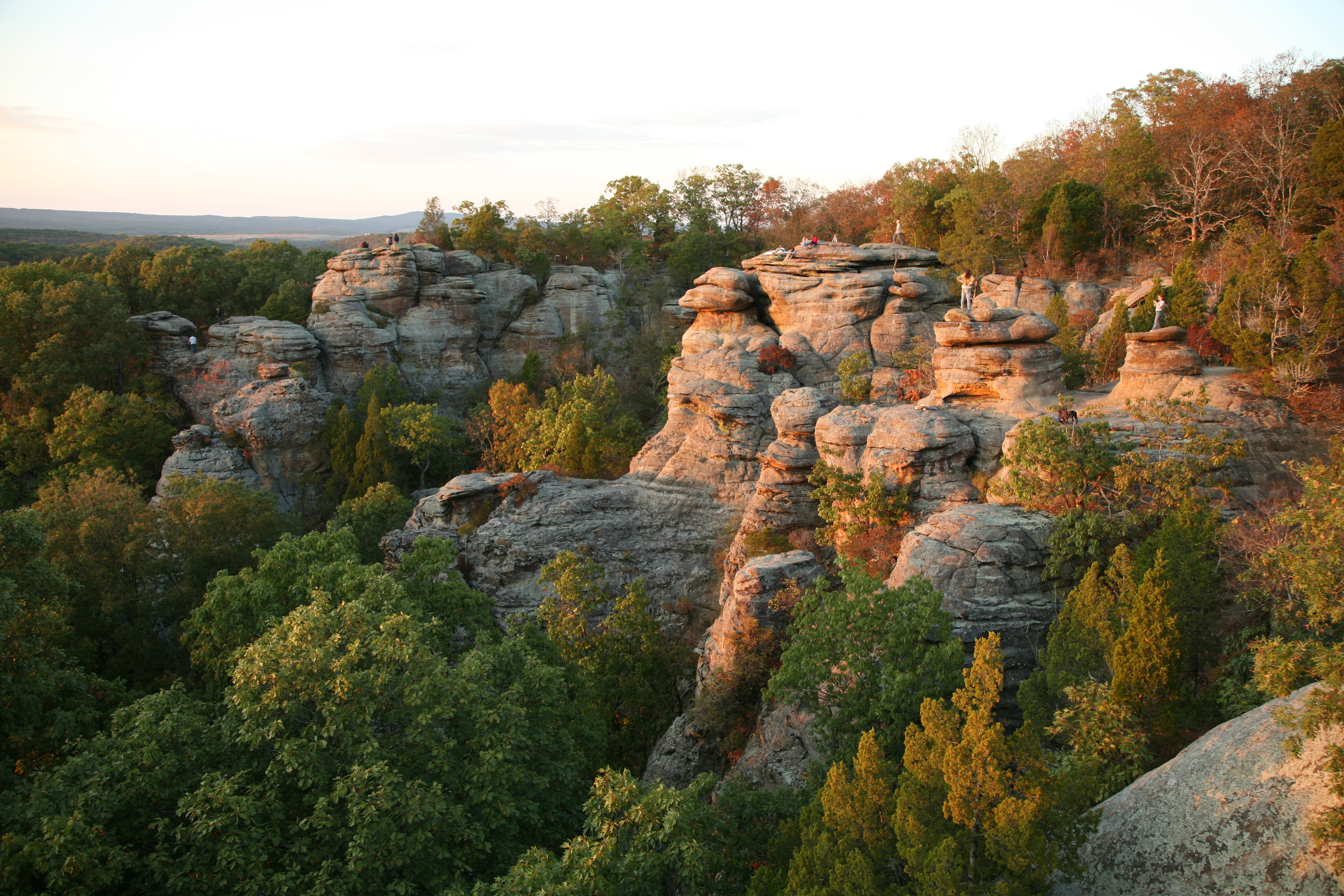
The Garden of the Gods, south of Harrisburg, rests in the Shawnee Hills and has an elevation of nearly 800 feet (244 m).

The rich farm land of northern and central Illinois is generally not found in Southern Illinois. Significant exceptions are the American Bottom along the Mississippi River and the alluvial soils of the Gulf Coastal Plain, a large region that has its northernmost extent in the two river valleys of Southern Illinois.

The region's other major river, the Ohio River, winds generally southwest, past Shawneetown, Cave-in-Rock, Elizabethtown, and Golconda. Its waters join the Mississippi at Cairo. In ancient times, the Ohio is thought to have flowed a more northerly course through Pope and Pulaski counties. It carved a broad valley there, fit for a major river. But today the underfit Bay Creek and Cache River occupy those valleys.

The hills of Little Egypt can be divided into two areas. The western area, more closely related to the Ozarks of Missouri, is chiefly in southern Jackson, Union, northern Alexander and Johnson counties. The eastern area, more closely related to the Wabash Valley seismic zone, is mostly in northern Pope, southern Saline, Gallatin, eastern Johnson and southern Williamson counties. The Shawnee National Forest covers a large territory, including seven wilderness areas: Garden of the Gods, Bay Creek, Clear Springs, Bald Knob, Burden Falls, Lusk Creek, and Panthers Den.

Of Southern Illinois's rivers, only the Mississippi and the Ohio are navigable for modern commerce. The Big Muddy River, Marys River, Saline River and Cache River run their courses in deep southern Illinois. The Kaskaskia River and Wabash River are nearby.

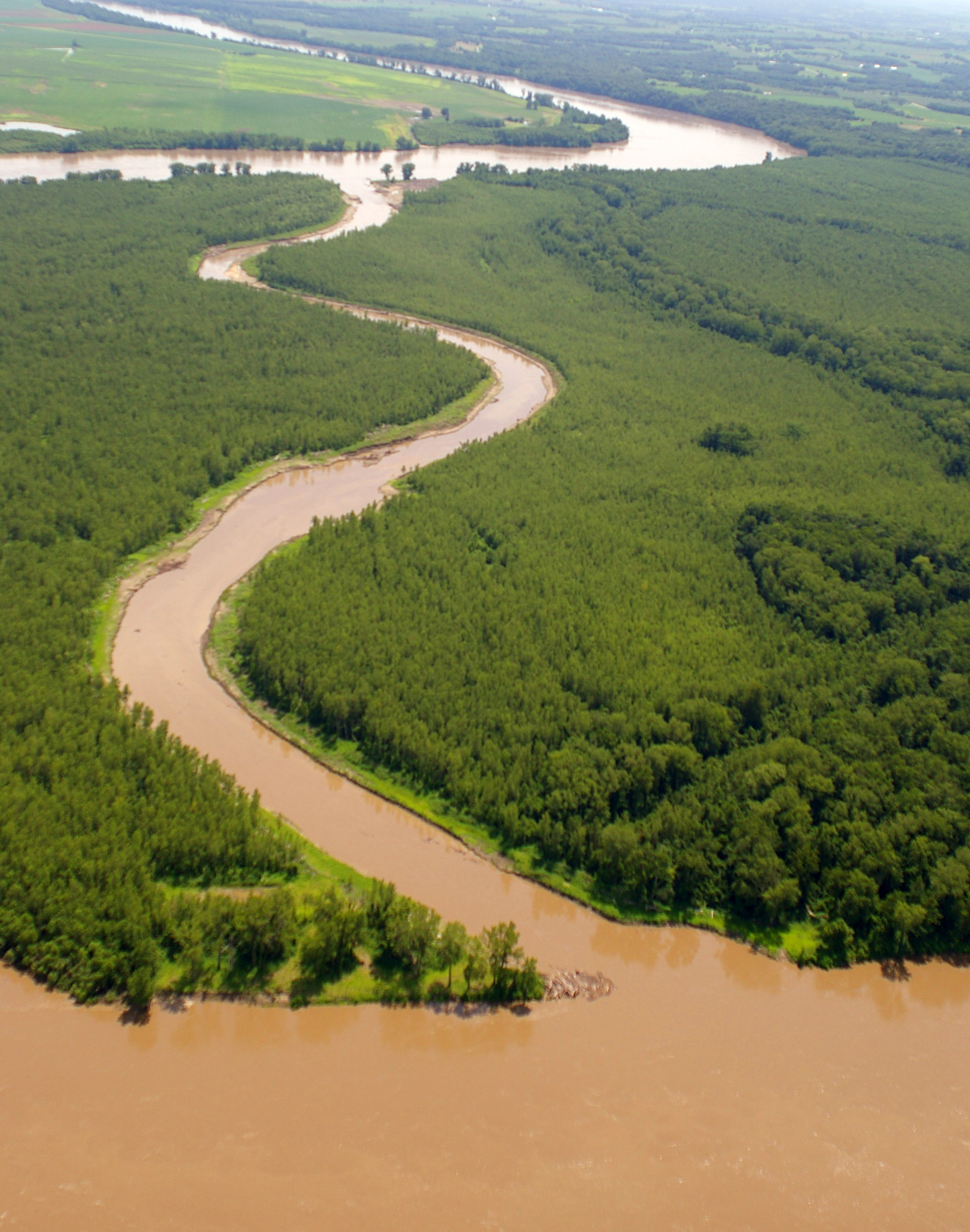
Jameson Island in the Big Muddy, looking south.

=== Shawnee National Forest ===
More than 500,000 acres (2,000 km^{2}) of Shawnee National Forest lie to the south of its gateway city Harrisburg. The Shawnee National Forest offers much to see and do. The national forest has 1,250 miles (2,010 km) of roadways, some 150 miles (240 km) of streams and frequent waterfalls, numerous ponds and lakes as large as 2,700 acres or 11 km^{2} (some with swimming beaches), 13 campgrounds, many picnicking sites, and seven wilderness areas where trails are designed for hiking and horseback riding.

Plant life is extremely diverse and ranges from sun-loving species to those that grow in dense shade. Tree cover dominates the publicly owned land, and is a significant component on privately owned lands. Oak-hickory is the predominant timber type, however, many other commercially important timber species also occupy significant land. More than 500 wildlife species can be found in the Forest, including 48 mammals, 237 birds, 52 reptiles, 47 amphibians, and 109 species of fish. There are seven federally listed threatened and endangered species that inhabit the Forest, as well as 33 species which are considered regionally sensitive, and 114 Forest-listed species.

=== Climate ===
Southern Illinois lies within the humid subtropical climate (Köppen climate classification Cfa). The region has no large mountains or large bodies of water to moderate its temperature and, thus, it is subject to both cold Arctic air and hot, humid tropical air from the Gulf of Mexico. Along with the rest of the midwestern United States, the region is home to some of the largest temperature extremes in the world.

The region has four distinct seasons. Spring is the wettest season and produces erratic severe weather ranging from tornadoes to winter storms. Summers are hot and humid, with only occasional and brief respite. The humidity often makes the heat index rise to temperatures feeling well above 100 °F (38 °C). Fall is mild with lower humidity and can produce intermittent bouts of heavy rainfall, with the first snow flurries usually forming in late November. Winters are cold with periodic snow and temperatures often below freezing. Thaws are usually frequent. Winter storm systems, such as Alberta clippers and Panhandle hooks, can bring days of heavy freezing rain, ice pellets, and snowfall.

The normal high temperature in July is 90 °F (32 °C). The normal low temperature in January is 21 °F (−6 °C), although this varies from year to year. Both 100 °F (37.8 °C) and 0 °F (−17.8 °C) temperatures can be seen on an average 2 or 3 days per year. The official record low is −23 °F (−31 °C) on February 2, 1884 in Harrisburg. The record high is 117 °F (47 °C) on July 14, 1954 in East St. Louis.

Southern Illinois has thunderstorms about 50 days a year on average. Thunderstorms contribute over half of the annual precipitation. Especially in the spring, these storms can often be severe, with high winds, large hail and tornadoes. Southern Illinois has been affected on more than one occasion by particularly damaging tornadoes.

A period of warm weather late in autumn known as Indian summer can occur – roses will still be in bloom as late as November or early December in some years.

=== Seismic zones ===
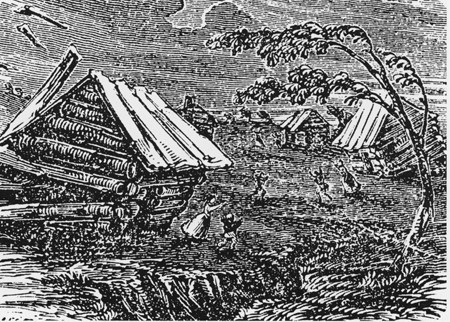
Contemporary woodcut of the 1812 New Madrid earthquake.

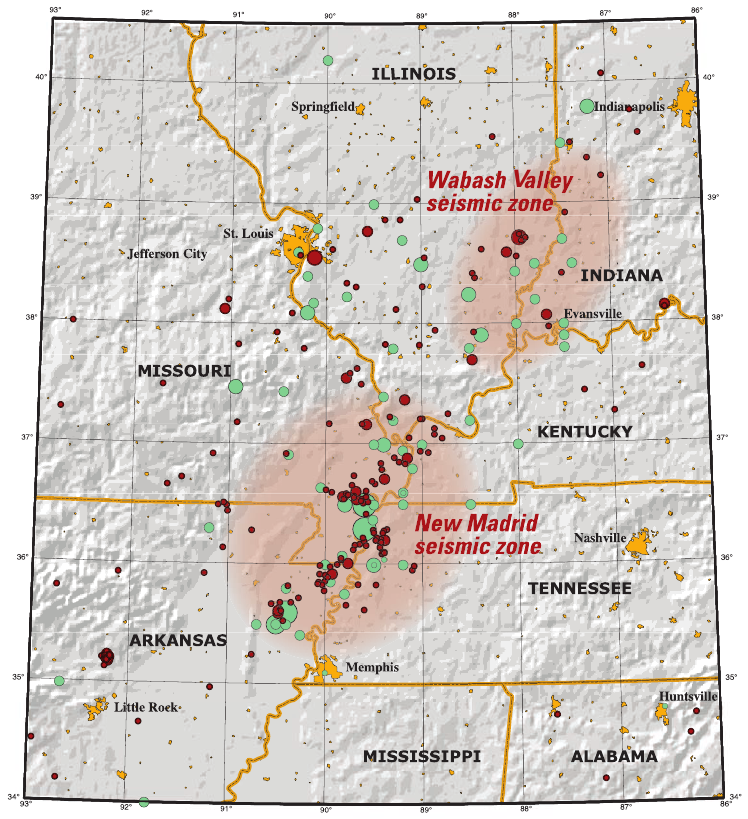
A map of quakes in the New Madrid and Wabash Valley seismic zones from 1974 to 2002.

Southern Illinois sits upon the verging point of two major fault systems, the New Madrid seismic zone and the Wabash Valley seismic zone. In the 1970s after the 5.4 Richter magnitude scale 1968 Illinois earthquake, scientists realized that there was an unknown fault under Saline County, just north of Eldorado, Illinois. This fault is called the Cottage Grove Fault, a small tear in the Earth's rock, in the Southern Illinois Basin. Seismographic mapping completed by geologists reveal that monoclines, anticlines, and synclines are present within the region; these signs suggest deformation during the Paleozoic, coincident to strike-slip faulting nearby.

A fault plane solution of the earthquake confirmed two nodal planes both striking north–south and dipping approximately 45 degrees to the east and to the west. This faulting suggests dip slip reverse motion, and to a horizontal east–west axis of confining stress. Although there are no confirmed faults in the immediate epicentral region, the motion indicated corresponds to that along the Wabash Valley seismic zone roughly 10 miles (20 km) east of the region, responsible for the 2008 Illinois earthquake. The rupture also occurred partially on the New Madrid fault, responsible for the great New Madrid earthquakes in 1812, consisting of the most powerful earthquakes to hit the contiguous United States.

== Transportation ==
=== Passenger rail ===
Southern Illinois at one time had an extensive network of railroads. Now only Amtrak, the U.S. passenger rail system, provides service to and through the area. Carbondale is served with three trains daily to and from Chicago, and one train daily to and from Memphis and New Orleans. Several trains each day run to and from Chicago and St. Louis, with Alton the major stop in Southern Illinois. Intercity passenger rail stations in Southern Illinois include Alton station, Carbondale station, Centralia station, and Du Quoin station.

A schematic map of the St. Louis MetroLink system

The St. Louis MetroLink is the light rail transit system in the Greater St. Louis area of Missouri and Illinois connecting the Metro East to downtown St. Louis. The entire system currently consists of two lines (Red Line and Blue Line) connecting Lambert-St. Louis International Airport and Shrewsbury, Missouri with Scott Air Force Base near Shiloh, Illinois, through downtown St. Louis. The system features 37 stations and carries an average of 61,573 people each weekday.

=== Transit ===
- Bond County Transportation
- Central Illinois Public Transportation
- Jackson County Mass Transit District
- Madison County Transit
- Monroe Randolph Transit District
- Rides Mass Transit District
- Saluki Express
- Shawnee Mass Transit District
- South Central Illinois Mass Transit District
- St. Clair County Transit District

=== Interstate freeways ===
The Metro East area near St. Louis has these additional freeways:

- Interstate 55
- Interstate 70
- Interstate 255
- Interstate 270

Southern Illinois has four major interstate freeways that connect with Missouri, Indiana, and Kentucky. Depending on the definition of Little Egypt's boundaries, there are four interstates in the region. I-57 is the main north–south freeway through Southern Illinois. It runs through the center of the area.

South of Marion is the western terminus of I-24. It runs southeast, crossing into Paducah, Kentucky near Metropolis. South of its junction with I-24, I-57 bends to the southwest and crosses into Missouri near Illinois's southernmost point by Cairo. I-70 runs east–west from St. Louis to central Indiana. I-64 runs east–west from St. Louis to southern Indiana. It is cosigned with I-57 for a short stretch at Mt. Vernon.

- Interstate 24
- Interstate 57
- Interstate 64

=== U.S. highways ===
- U.S. Route 40
- U.S. Route 45 runs from the Brookport Bridge across the Ohio River east of Paducah, Kentucky, and through Shawnee National Forest. Saline County, Illinois is its most populated stretch in Southern Illinois, connecting the towns of Stonefort, Carrier Mills, Harrisburg, and Eldorado, all within the county. The highway continues north through the Chicago metropolitan area and to the Wisconsin border east of Antioch. With a length of 428.99 miles (690.39 km) in Illinois, U.S. 45 is the longest numbered route in Illinois.
- U.S. Route 50
- U.S. Route 51 roughly follows the Illinois Central Railroad line north–south through the middle of the entire state. Illinois Route 1 runs north–south along the eastern edge of Little Egypt; Illinois Route 3 parallels the Mississippi River along the western edge of the area.
- U.S. Route 60
- U.S. Route 62
- Historic U.S. Route 66
- U.S. Route 67

=== State highways ===
- Illinois Route 1
- Illinois Route 3
- Illinois Route 4
- Illinois Route 13
- Illinois Route 14
- Illinois Route 15
- Illinois Route 16
- Illinois Route 33
- Illinois Route 34
- Illinois Route 37
- Illinois Route 96
- Illinois Route 100
- Illinois Route 108
- Illinois Route 109
- Illinois Route 111
- Illinois Route 127
- Illinois Route 130
- Illinois Route 140
- Illinois Route 141
- Illinois Route 142
- Illinois Route 143
- Illinois Route 145
- Illinois Route 146
- Illinois Route 147
- Illinois Route 148
- Illinois Route 149
- Illinois Route 150
- Illinois Route 151
- Illinois Route 152
- Illinois Route 153
- Illinois Route 154
- Illinois Route 155
- Illinois Route 156
- Illinois Route 157
- Illinois Route 158
- Illinois Route 159
- Illinois Route 160
- Illinois Route 161
- Illinois Route 162
- Illinois Route 163
- Illinois Route 166
- Illinois Route 169
- Illinois Route 177
- Illinois Route 184
- Illinois Route 203
- Illinois Route 242
- Illinois Route 250
- Illinois Route 255
- Illinois Route 267

=== Bridges and ferries ===
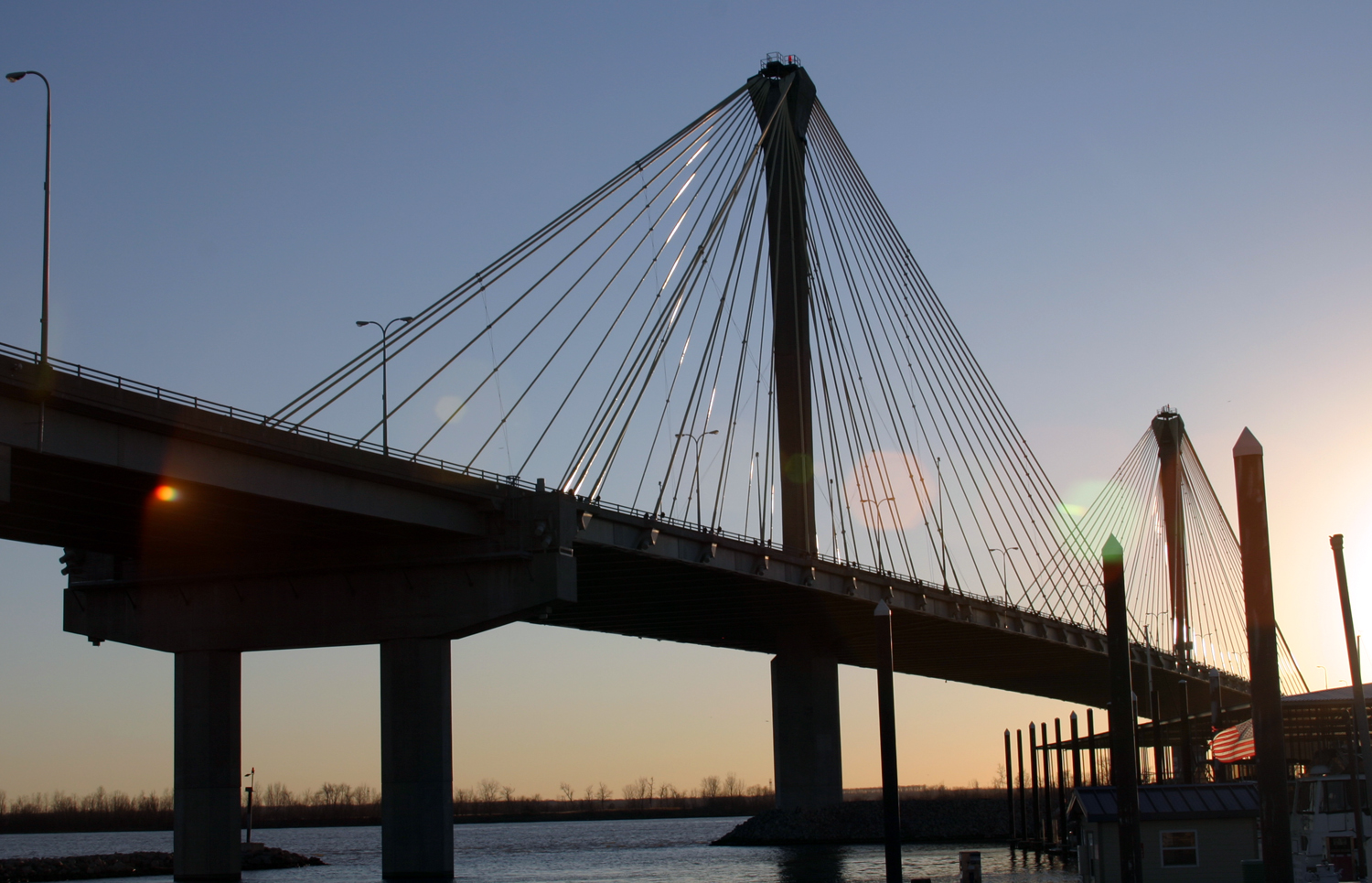
The Clark Bridge is a cable-stayed bridge across the Mississippi River between West Alton, Missouri and Alton, Illinois.

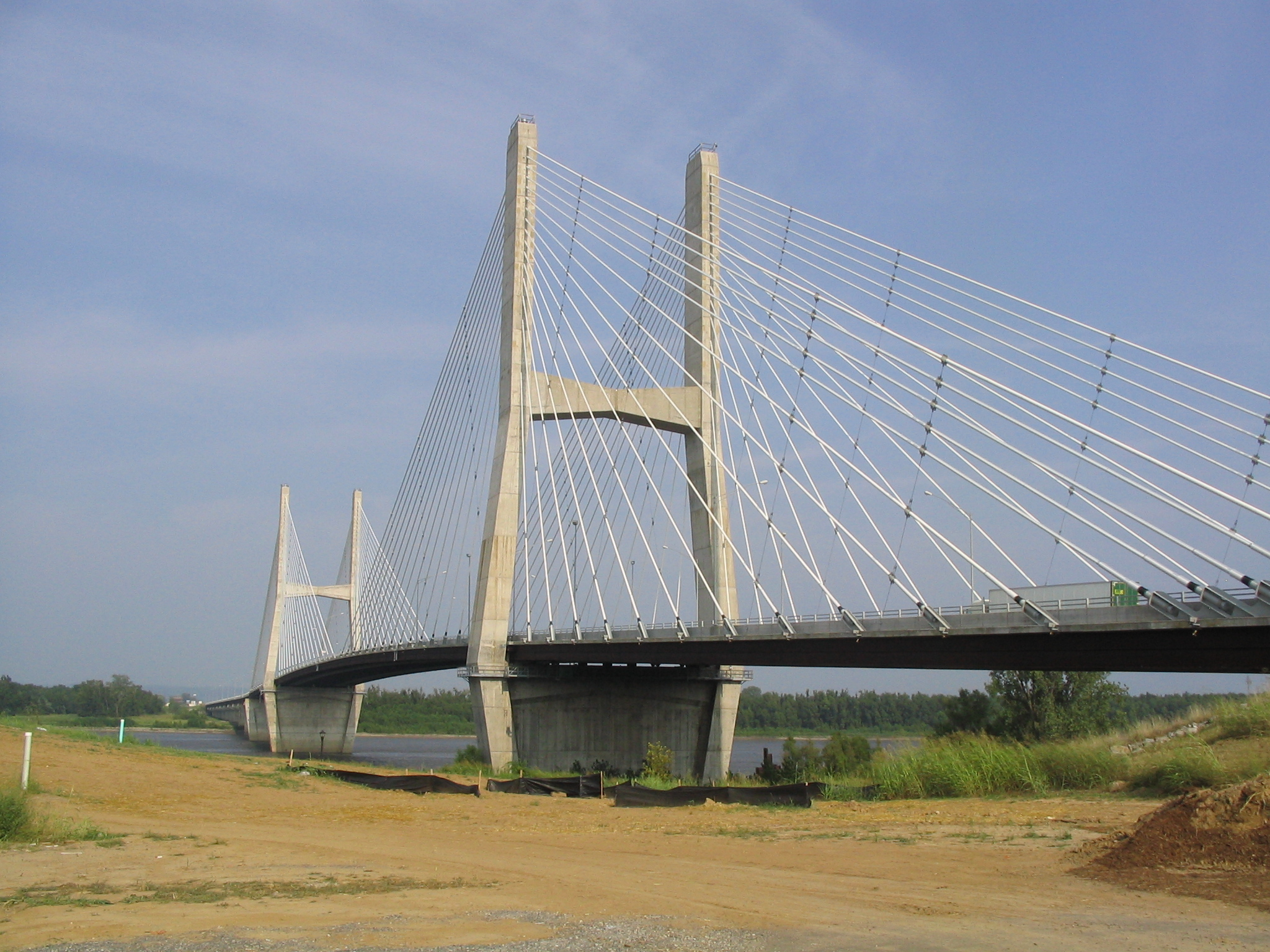
The Bill Emerson Memorial Bridge is a cable-stayed bridge connecting Missouri's Route 34 and Route 74 with Illinois Route 146 across the Mississippi River between Cape Girardeau, Missouri and East Cape Girardeau, Illinois.

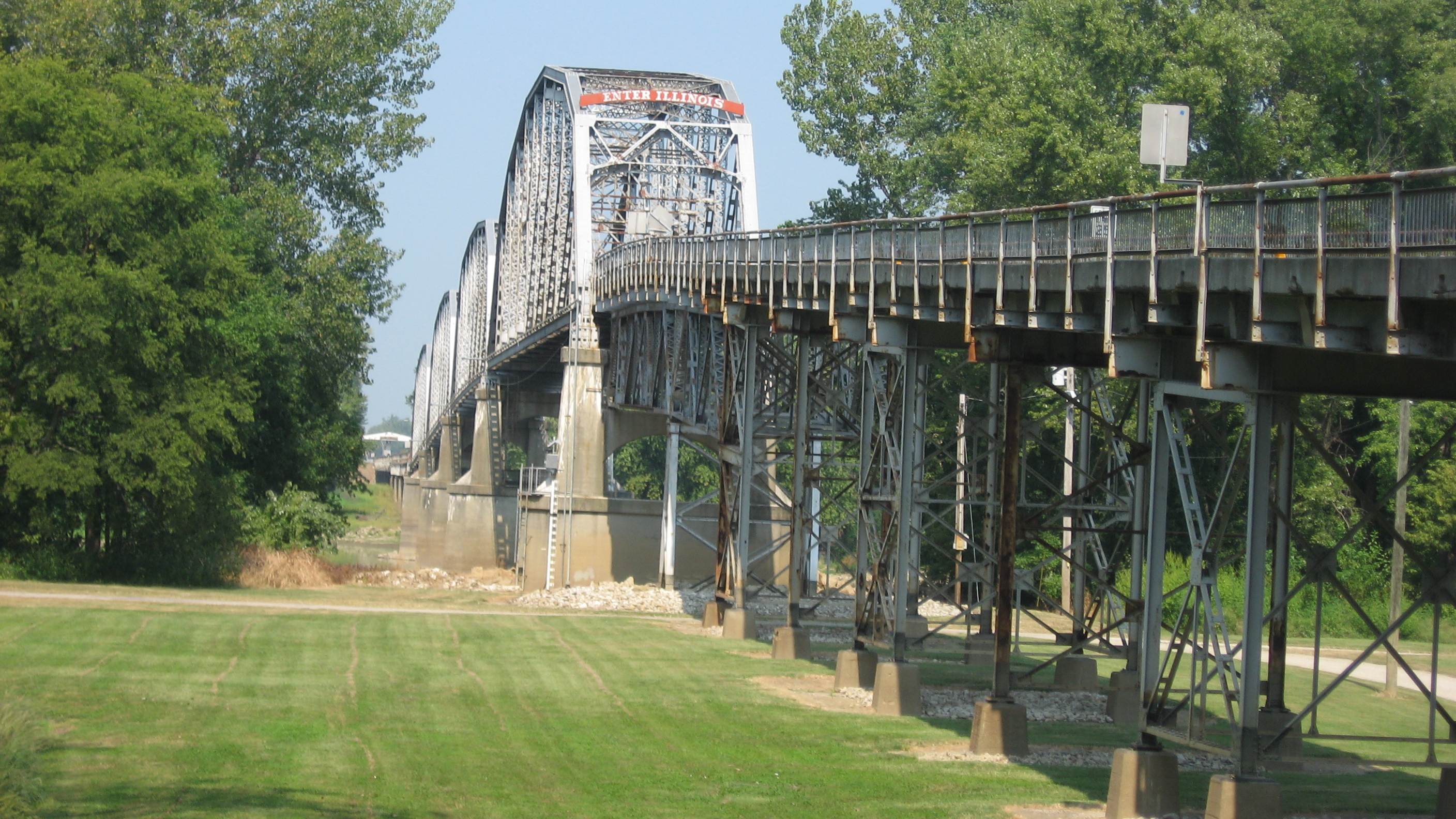
The New Harmony Toll Bridge is a through truss bridge that connected Illinois Route 14 and Indiana State Road 66 across the Wabash River between New Harmony, Indiana and rural White County, Illinois until its closure in 2012.

Bridges and ferries are an important feature in the region, being it is surrounded on three sides by major rivers, the Ohio and Wabash rivers to the east and south, and the Mississippi River to the west.

Indiana:

- Red Skelton Memorial Bridge at Vincennes, Indiana, carries U.S. 50/150 to Lawrenceville, Illinois
- Lincoln Memorial Bridge, a deck arch bridge carrying Business U.S. Route 50 over the Wabash River between Vincennes, Indiana and Lawrence County, Illinois
- Wabash Cannonball Bridge at St. Francisville, carries a farm road from Knox County, Indiana to Lawrence County, Illinois
- Mount Carmel Bridge at Mount Carmel, carries IL 15/IN 64
- Interstate 64 Bridge, located 2 mi (3.2 km) south of Grayville, Illinois between Posey County, Indiana, Gibson County, Indiana, and White County, Illinois.
- New Harmony Bridge, toll bridge that formerly carried IL 14/IN 68
- Wabash Memorial Bridge, spans the Wabash River between Indiana State Road 62 and Illinois Route 141, east of New Haven, continues to Evansville, Indiana

Kentucky:

- Illinois Route 13 at Old Shawneetown, Illinois
- Brookport Bridge, U.S. Route 45 at Brookport, Illinois
- Interstate 24 Ohio River Bridge near Brookport/Metropolis
- Cairo Ohio River Bridge, U.S. Route 51/60/62 near Cairo, Illinois and Wickliffe, Kentucky

Missouri:

- Cairo Mississippi River Bridge, a cantilever bridge carrying U.S. Route 60 and U.S. Route 62 across the Mississippi River between Bird's Point, Missouri and Cairo, Illinois.
- Cairo I-57 Bridge, an arch bridge carrying 4 lanes of Interstate 57 across the Mississippi River between Charleston, Missouri and Cairo, Illinois
- Bill Emerson Memorial Bridge, a cable-stayed bridge connecting Missouri's Route 34 and Route 74 with Illinois Route 146 across the Mississippi River between Cape Girardeau, Missouri and East Cape Girardeau, Illinois
- Chester Bridge, a truss bridge connecting Missouri's Route 51 with Illinois Route 150 across the Mississippi River between Perryville, Missouri and Chester, Illinois

Mississippi River in the St. Louis area:

- Clark Bridge, a cable-stayed bridge between West Alton, Missouri and Alton, Illinois, carries U.S. Route 67
- Eads Bridge, combined road and railway bridge over the Mississippi River, connecting St. Louis and East St. Louis
- Jefferson Barracks Bridge, a pair of bridges that span the Mississippi River on the south side of St. Louis, Missouri, that carry traffic for Interstate 255 and U.S. Route 50
- Martin Luther King, Jr. Bridge, carries 3 lanes (1 westbound and 2 eastbound) of Route 799 between St. Louis and East St. Louis
- McKinley Bridge, steel truss bridge connecting northern portions of St. Louis with Venice, Illinois
- New Chain of Rocks Bridge, a pair of bridges, currently carries traffic for Interstate 270, near Granite City, Illinois and Bellefontaine Neighbors, Missouri
- Poplar Street Bridge, carries Interstate 55, Interstate 64, and U.S. Route 40 across the Mississippi between St. Louis and East St. Louis
- Stan Musial Veterans Memorial Bridge began carrying Interstate 70 between St. Clair County, Illinois, and St. Louis in 2014.

A free ferry crosses the Ohio River at Cave-in-Rock. A toll ferry crosses the Mississippi at Ste. Genevieve, Missouri, near Chester, Illinois. Four other ferries operate in Calhoun County.

=== Airports ===
- Benton Municipal Airport
- Carmi Municipal Airport
- Centralia Municipal Airport
- Effingham County Memorial Airport
- Fairfield Municipal Airport (Illinois)
- Harrisburg-Raleigh Airport
- Lawrenceville-Vincennes International Airport
- Metropolis Municipal Airport
- MidAmerica St. Louis Airport / Scott Air Force Base
- Mount Vernon Airport
- Pinckneyville-DuQuoin Airport
- Southern Illinois Airport
- Sparta Community Airport (Hunter Field)
- St. Louis Downtown Airport
- St. Louis Metro-East Airport
- St. Louis Regional Airport
- Williamson County Regional Airport

==== Out of state airports ====
  - Barkley Regional Airport
- Cape Girardeau Regional Airport
- Evansville Regional Airport
- Lambert-St. Louis International Airport
- Spirit of St. Louis Airport

== Colleges and universities ==
- Blackburn College (Carlinville)
- East St. Louis Community College Center (East St. Louis)
- Greenville University (Greenville)
- John A. Logan College (Carterville)
- Kaskaskia College (Centralia)
- Lewis and Clark Community College (Godfrey)
- McKendree University (Lebanon)
- Olney Central College (Olney)
- Principia College (Elsah)
- Rend Lake College (Ina)
- Shawnee Community College (Ullin)
- Southeastern Illinois College (Harrisburg)
- Southern Illinois University Carbondale (Carbondale)
- Frontier Community College (Fairfield)
- Southern Illinois University Edwardsville (Edwardsville)
- Southern Illinois University School of Dental Medicine (Alton)
- Southwestern Illinois College (Belleville)
- Wabash Valley College (Mount Carmel)

== Historical politics ==
Southern Illinois has historically been a conservative Democratic region. In the early months of the Civil War, some residents in Williamson County voted for secession from the Union. On April 15, 1861 the citizens of Marion passed a resolution calling for the division of Illinois and the secession of Southern Illinois. The resolution was soon repealed, but General Benjamin Prentiss left a company of men near Marion for defense as he passed by on his way to a garrison in Cairo. Despite some southern sympathizers, most young men in the region joined the Union Army.

Democratic roots in Southern Illinois relate to the region's shared culture with the South, where the Democratic Party before the American Civil War and after Reconstruction was dominant until the 1960s. Democratic affiliations were strengthened during the Great Depression and Franklin D. Roosevelt's administration. There are, however, some long-time Republican counties in the region, most notably, Edwards County.

Within the last few decades, Southern Illinois has trended GOP due to nationwide support for the GOP among rural areas, while Northern Illinois due to outward migration from Democratic-leaning Cook County has trended Democratic. Democratic candidates were competitive in the counties of Southern Illinois until around 1996. Beginning as recently as the presidential election of 2000, Democrats have under-performed in Southern Illinois despite winning Illinois consecutively.

== Economy ==
There are two main centers of commerce for Southern Illinois. They consist of the St. Louis, Missouri metropolitan area (home to approximately 2.8 million people), and the Carbondale, Marion, Herrin, Harrisburg area (home to approximately 245,000 people).

The main agricultural products of Southern Illinois are crops such as corn and soybeans. Apples, peaches, grapes, are commonly found throughout Southern Illinois as well as the occasional sunflower, cotton, wheat, hay, and milo fields. In recent years there has been development of wineries in the Shawnee Hills region. Additional growth has occurred with the local foods movement as Southern Illinois's climate allows for fruit and vegetable production.

Southern Illinois is also the home to aquaculture, beef, swine, equine, sheep, goats, and other livestock production. Agricultural efforts in the region are greatly aided by a small University of Illinois Extension research station near Dixon Springs and extensive research from Southern Illinois University – Carbondale's College of Agricultural Sciences. SIUC is home to the state's only non-land grant research-focused university with an agricultural college which provides practical research to the scientific and agricultural communities both in Southern Illinois as well as the rest of the state and the broader region.

Southern Illinois also has significant coal deposits; however, since the late 1980s, the coal industry has suffered significant decline due to the decreased demand for high-sulfur coal, which causes more pollution. The collapse of the coal industry had profound and lasting impact on the region's economy. With the introduction and application of scrubber technology at power plants, demand for high-sulfur has made a return in the 2010s.

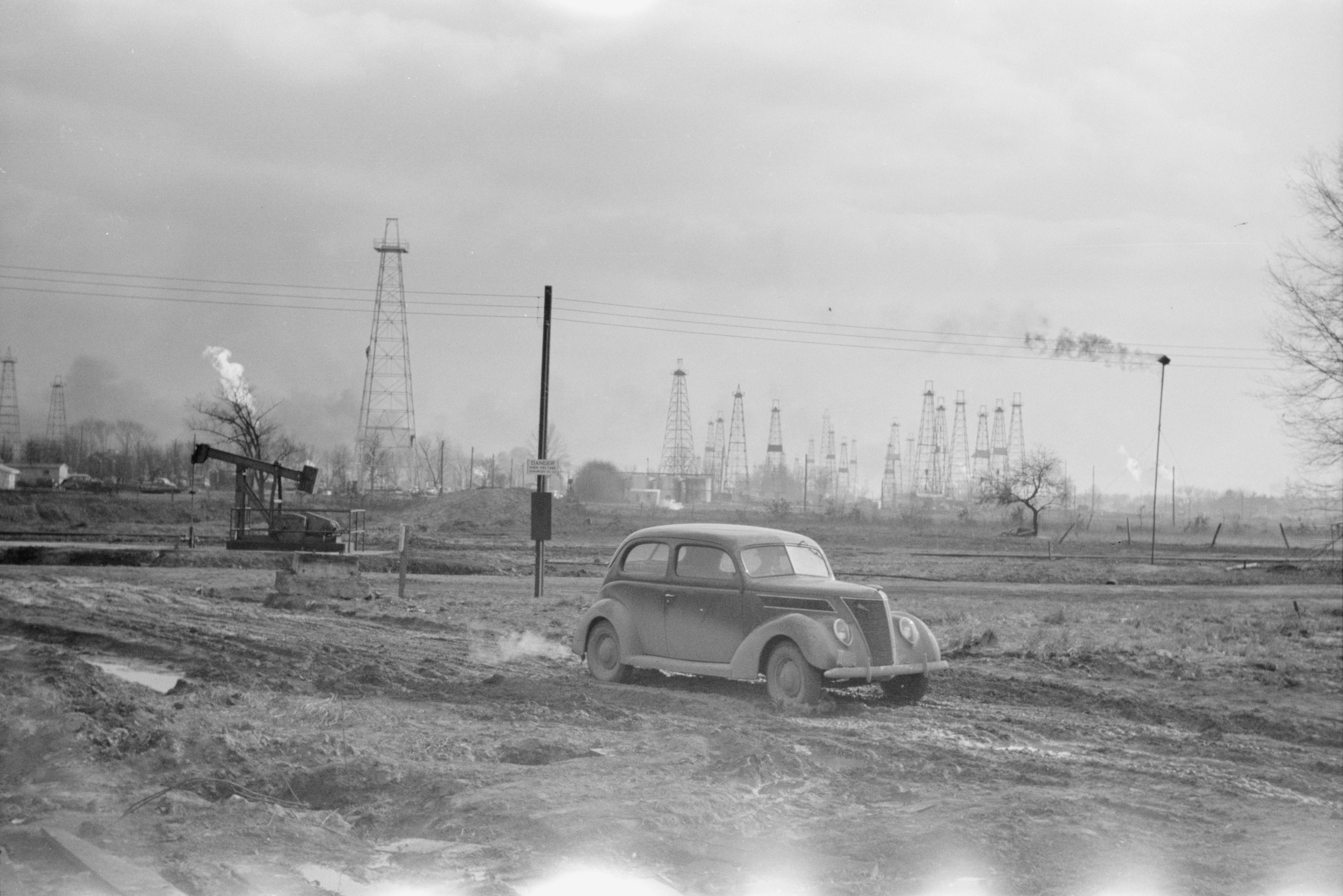
An oil field in 1940, Marion County, near Salem, Illinois

The Illinois oil basin is located mostly in Little Egypt. During the early 1940s and 1950s, Little Egypt had a modest oil boom in towns such as Carmi, McLeansboro, and Lawrenceville. Oil production reached more than 140,000,000 barrels (22,000,000 m^{3}) per year in the 1940s, but dropped to 10,000,000 barrels (1,600,000 m^{3}) per year by 1995. Oil wells in the region have relatively low yield and produce oil with a high sulfur content, making it expensive to process. There has been no significant drilling activity in the basin since the late 1970s.

Manufacturing in Southern Illinois is typically clustered in the largest towns of each county, with the people of smaller towns and villages often commuting to work in the factories. Many of these towns have a number of light factories and other industrial facilities in their industrial parks. Products include industrial electronics, minor electrical items, automobile parts, and packaging materials. Related services include large-scale printing as well as transportation and distribution of warehoused materials and goods. A high percentage of local jobs are in these light industries.

== Culture ==
Southern Illinois is influenced culturally by the rest of Illinois, neighboring Missouri and Indiana, and Upper Southern states like Kentucky and Tennessee. The immigration route from the east coast ran along the Ohio River, which joined settlements on both sides. The Cumberland River flowed northwest through Kentucky and Tennessee before joining the Ohio near Paducah, Kentucky, affording a migration route from the interior of those states. Thus, settlers who came to Southern Illinois were from Virginia, Kentucky, and Tennessee, with most of these being of northern English and Scots-Irish descent, who formed the last major migration from the British Isles to the colonies before the Revolutionary War, and settled mostly in the backcountry. Some migrated further west into Missouri. A road between Golconda and Jonesboro carried settlers and commerce across Southern Illinois, as well as the Cherokee on the Trail of Tears.

Little Egypt exists at the confluence of the North Midland and South Midland dialects of American English. South Midland becomes more prominent as one approaches the Ohio River. The dialect change is not a continuum, but rather occurs in pockets, with certain towns and regions notably favoring one dialect over the other. This difference can be found between lifelong residents of the same town. No stigma is associated to either dialect within southern Illinois. According to David Hackett Fischer in his book Albion's Seed: Four British Folkways to America, the dialect of this region is Southern Highland. It was derived from the linguistics of the people of the Southern Appalachian region. This is consistent with the majority of the early settlers of this region migrating from the Upper South. The older term for this type of dialect was "Scotch-Irish" speech. The correct term today is Scots-Irish.

=== Tourism ===
Southern Illinois prides itself in tourism as a quaint rural area. There are many state parks in the area, benefiting from the scenery of the Shawnee National Forest. Additionally, Southern Illinois is the oldest part of the state with many historical landmarks to be seen in the area and numerous historical markers dotting the counties.

==== Casinos ====
- Argosy Casino (Alton)
- Harrah's (Metropolis)
- Casino Queen (East St. Louis)

==== Wineries and orchards ====
Southernmost Illinois - Things To Do

Winery / Orchard	Location
Alto Vineyards	Alto Pass
Bella Terra Winery	Creal Springs
Blue Sky Vineyard	Makanda
Cache River Basin Vineyard & Winery	Belknap
Dale Bremer Orchard	Metropolis
Eastman's Orchard	Goreville
Feather Hills Vineyard & Winery	Makanda
Flamm Orchards	Cobden
Hickory Ridge Vineyard	Pomona
Hogg Hollow Winery	Glendale
Honker Hill Winery	Carbondale
Katy-Lynn Winery	Carbondale
Kite Hill Vineyards	Carbondale
Lincoln Heritage Winery	Cobden
Lipe Orchards	Carbondale
Mileur Orchard	Murphysboro
Monte Alegre Vineyard & Cellars	Carbondale
Owl Creek Vineyard	Cobden
Peach Barn Winery & Cafe	Alto Pass
Pheasant Hollow Winery	Whittington
Pomona Winery	Pomona
Rendleman Orchards	Alto Pass
StarView Vineyards	Cobden
Uncorked Tours	Alto Pass
Von Jakob Winery & Brewery	Alto Pass
Walker's Bluff	Carterville
See also: Map of Shawnee Hills Wine Trail

=== Parks ===
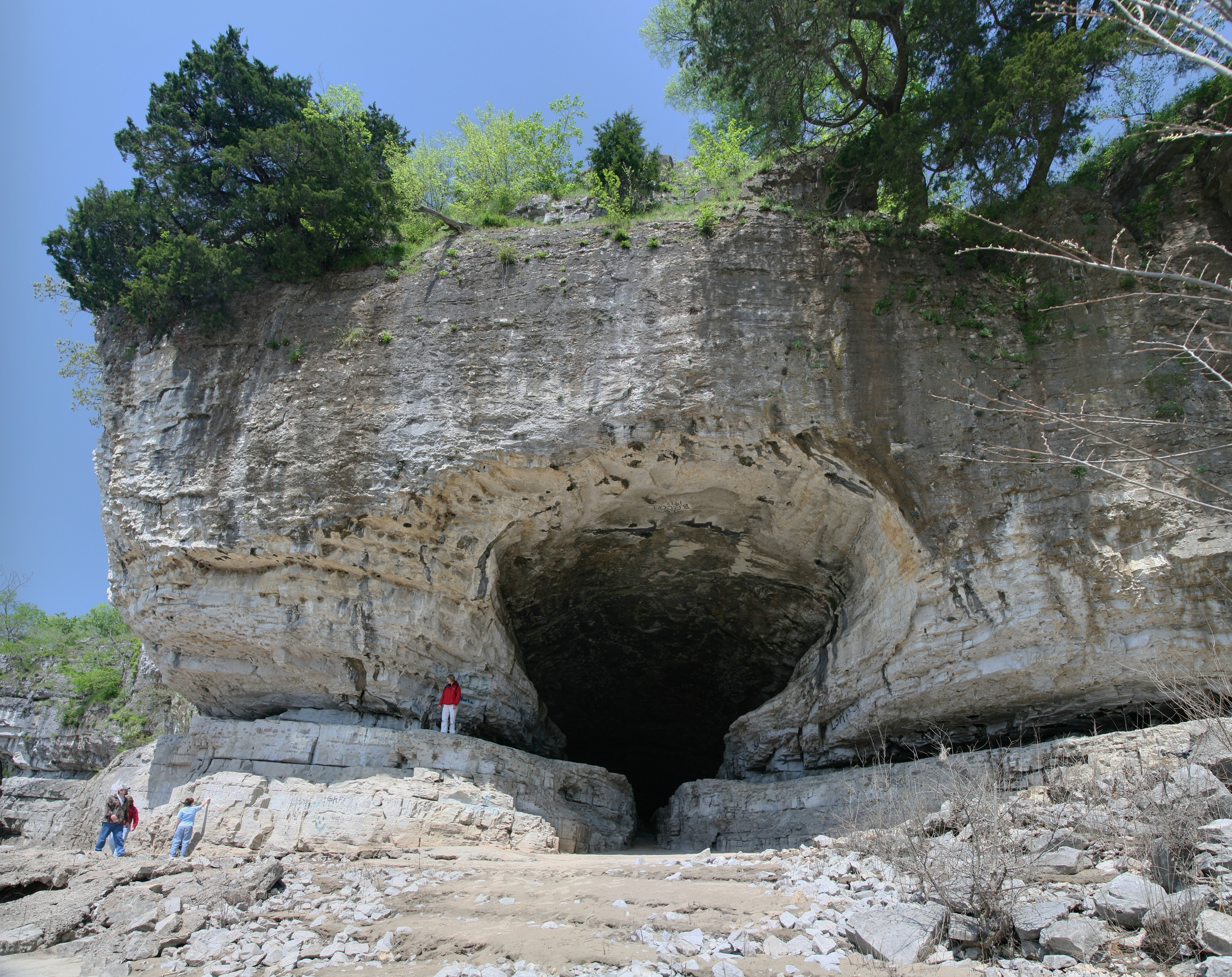
The cave at Cave-in-Rock State Park

Prominent State Parks within the Shawnee Hills and Shawnee National Forest region include:

- Beall Woods State Park
- Cave-in-Rock State Park
- Cache River State Natural Area
- Wildcat Hollow State Habitat Area
- Crawford County State Fish and Wildlife Area
- Dixon Springs State Park
- Eldon Hazlet State Recreation Area
- Ferne Clyffe State Park
- Fort Massac State Park
- Giant City State Park
- Golconda Marina State Recreation Area
- Hamilton County State Fish and Wildlife Area
- Horseshoe Lake State Fish and Wildlife Area
- Kaskaskia River State Fish and Wildlife Area
- Kinkaid Lake State Fish and Wildlife Area
- Lake Murphysboro State Park
- Mermet Lake State Fish and Wildlife Area
- Newton Lake State Fish and Wildlife Area
- Pyramid State Recreation Area
- Randolph County State Recreation Area
- Ramsey Lake State Recreation Area
- Red Hills State Park
- Rend Lake State Fish and Wildlife Area
- Saline County State Fish and Wildlife Area
- Sam Dale Lake State Fish and Wildlife Area
- Sam Parr State Fish and Wildlife Area
- Sielbeck Forest Natural Area
- South Shore State Park
- Stephen A. Forbes State Recreation Area
- Tunnel Hill State Trail
- Ten Mile Creek State Fish and Wildlife Area
- Trail of Tears State Forest
- Union County State Fish and Wildlife Area
- Washington County State Recreation Area
- Wayne Fitzgerrell State Recreation Area
- Du Quoin State Fairgounds

=== Sports ===
Team	Sport	League	Venue
Gateway Grizzlies	Baseball	Frontier League	GCS Ballpark
Southern Illinois Salukis	Basketball, cross country, golf, softball, swimming, tennis, track and field, volleyball, football	Missouri Valley Conference and Missouri Valley Football Conference	Several, including SIU Arena and Saluki Stadium
SIU Edwardsville Cougars	Baseball, basketball, cross country, golf, soccer, softball, tennis, track and field, volleyball, wrestling	Ohio Valley Conference, Missouri Valley Conference (men's soccer only), Southern Conference (wrestling only)	Several, including Ralph Korte Stadium and the Vadalabene Center
Thrillville Thrillbillies	Baseball	Prospect League	Mtn Dew Park

== See also ==
- Central Illinois
- Ku Klux Klan in Southern Illinois
- Northern Illinois
- Southern Illinois Speech and Acting League
