= WJVO =

- South Jacksonville, Illinois; United States
- Broadcast area: Jacksonville, Illinois
- Frequency: 105.5 MHz (HD Radio)
- Branding: WJVO 105.5 FM

Programming
- Format: Country
- Subchannels: HD2: Classic hits

Ownership
- Owner: Sarah Shellhammer; (Morgan County Media LLC)
- Sister stations: WJIL

History
- First air date: September 1, 1986

Technical information
- Licensing authority: FCC
- Facility ID: 43773
- Class: A
- ERP: 6,000 watts
- HAAT: 100 meters (330 ft)
- Translator: HD2: 102.9 W275BM (Jacksonville)

Links
- Public license information: Public file; LMS
- Website: wjvoradio.com

WJVO (105.5 FM) is a radio station broadcasting a country music format. Licensed to South Jacksonville, Illinois, the station serves the Jacksonville, Illinois, area. WJVO is owned by Sarah Shellhammer, through licensee Morgan County Media LLC.

== Translator ==
WJVO's HD2 subchannel is also broadcast on the following translator:

Broadcast translator for WJVO-HD2
Call sign	Frequency	City of license	FID	ERP (W)	Class	FCC info
W275BM	102.9 FM	Jacksonville, Illinois	144079	250	D	LMS
