= WHCO =

- Sparta, Illinois; United States
- Broadcast area: Sparta, Illinois; Randolph County, Illinois
- Frequency: 1230 kHz
- Branding: "Real Country 1230 and 97.3 WHCO"

Programming
- Format: Country
- Affiliations: Brownfield Radio Network; Fighting Illini Sports Network; RFD Radio Network; Real Country (Westwood One); St. Louis Blues; St. Louis Cardinals

Ownership
- Owner: David and Carol Holder; (Southern Illinois Radio Group, Inc.)

History
- First air date: February 1955

Technical information
- Licensing authority: FCC
- Facility ID: 27264
- Class: C
- Power: 1,000 Watts
- Transmitter coordinates: 38°07′25.0″N 89°43′20.0″W

Links
- Public license information: Public file; LMS
- Webcast: WHCO Webstream
- Website: WHCO Online

WHCO (1230 AM) is a country formatted broadcast radio station licensed to Sparta, Illinois, serving Sparta and Randolph County, Illinois. WHCO is owned and operated by David and Carol Holder, through licensee Southern Illinois Radio Group, Inc.

== History ==
WHCO began broadcasting in February 1955 and aired a country music format. It was owned by Hirsch Communication Engineering Corporation. By the early 1970s, the station was airing a middle of the road (MOR) format, along with 30 hours of country music a week. In the 1980s and 1990s, the station aired a full service format, with adult contemporary and country music, along with talk, farm, and religious programming. In 1998, the station adopted a news-talk format, carrying local programming as well as nationally syndicated hosts such as G. Gordon Liddy, Larry King, and Jim Bohannon. In 2008, WHCO returned to a country music format. In 2013, controlling interest in the station was sold to David and Carol Holder's Southern Illinois Radio Group, Inc. for $150,000.

== Translator ==
In addition to the main station, WHCO is relayed by an FM translator.

Call sign	Frequency	City of license	FID	ERP (W)	HAAT	Class	FCC info
W247CP	(97.3 FM) FM	Sparta, Illinois	138452	250 watts	71 m (233 ft)	D	LMS
