= WTAY =

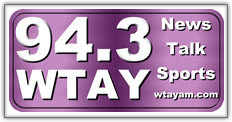
- Robinson, Illinois; United States
- Frequency: 1570 kHz
- Branding: 94.3 WTAY

Programming
- Format: Talk, sports and classic hits
- Affiliations: Compass Media Networks; Premiere Networks; Radio America; Westwood One

Ownership
- Owner: The Original Company, Inc.
- Sister stations: WTYE

History
- First air date: January 9, 1956

Technical information
- Licensing authority: FCC
- Facility ID: 2270
- Class: D
- Power: 250 watts (day); 188 watts (night)
- Transmitter coordinates: 39°00′22″N 87°46′36″W
- Translator: 94.3 W232DC (Robinson)

Links
- Public license information: Public file; LMS
- Website: wtyefm.com

WTAY (1570 AM) is a radio station broadcasting a talk, sports and classic hits format. Licensed to Robinson, Illinois, United States, the station is owned by The Original Company, Inc.

== Translators ==
In addition to the main station, WTAY is relayed by the following low-power translator:

Broadcast translator for WTAY
Call sign	Frequency	City of license	FID	ERP (W)	HAAT	Class	FCC info
W232DC	94.3 FM	Robinson, Illinois	152849	250	133 m (436 ft)	D	LMS
