= WJIL =

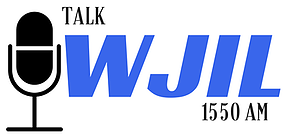
- Jacksonville, Illinois; United States
- Frequency: 1550 kHz
- Branding: TALK 1550 AM

Programming
- Format: News/Talk

Ownership
- Owner: Sarah Shellhammer; (Morgan County Media LLC)
- Sister stations: WJVO

History
- First air date: November 1961

Technical information
- Licensing authority: FCC
- Facility ID: 43772
- Class: D
- Power: 1,000 watts day 10 watts night
- Transmitter coordinates: 39°43′20″N 90°11′46.70″W
- Translators: W246DP (97.1 MHz, Jacksonville)

Links
- Public license information: Public file; LMS
- Website: WJIL Online

WJIL 1550 AM is a radio station licensed to Jacksonville, Illinois broadcasting a news/talk format. WJIL is owned by Sarah Shellhammer, through licensee Morgan County Media LLC.

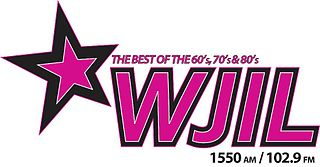
WJIL's logo under previous classic hits format
