= WTYE =

- Robinson, Illinois; United States
- Frequency: 101.7 MHz
- Branding: Classic Hits WTYE

Programming
- Format: Classic hits
- Affiliations: Fox News Radio

Ownership
- Owner: The Original Company, Inc.
- Sister stations: WTAY

History
- First air date: 1963

Technical information
- Licensing authority: FCC
- Facility ID: 2271
- Class: A
- ERP: 3,100 watts
- HAAT: 142 meters
- Transmitter coordinates: 39°00′22″N 87°46′36″W

Links
- Public license information: Public file; LMS
- Webcast: Listen live
- Website: www.wtyefm.com

WTYE (101.7 FM) is a radio station broadcasting a classic hits format. Licensed to Robinson, Illinois, the station is owned by The Original Company, Inc.

WTYE has a construction permit to increase its effective radiated power from 3,100 watts to 12,000 watts, and upgrade its license from class A to B1.
