= Romine Township, Marion County, Illinois =

Romine Township
- Township

- Location of Illinois in the United States
- Coordinates: 38°31′N 88°45′W
- Country: United States
- State: Illinois
- County: Marion
- Settled: November 4, 1873

Area
  - Total: 35.96 sq mi (93.1 km^{2})
  - Land: 35.9 sq mi (93 km^{2})
  - Water: 0.05 sq mi (0.13 km^{2})
- Elevation: 446 ft (136 m)

Population (2010)
  - Estimate (2016): 498
  - Density: 14.3/sq mi (5.5/km^{2})
- Time zone: UTC-6 (CST)
  - Summer (DST): UTC-5 (CDT)
- FIPS code: 17-121-65455

Romine Township is located in Marion County, Illinois. As of the 2010 census, its population was 514 and it contained 227 housing units.

== Geography ==
Romine Township (T1N R4E) is centered at 38°31′N 88°45′W (38.509,-88.763). According to the 2010 census, the township has a total area of 35.96 square miles (93.1 km^{2}), of which 35.9 square miles (93 km^{2}) (or 99.83%) is land and 0.05 square miles (0.13 km^{2}) (or 0.14%) is water.

== Demographics ==
Historical population
Census	Pop.	Note	%±
2016 (est.)	498
U.S. Decennial Census

== Adjacent townships ==
- Iuka Township (north)
- Garden Hill Township, Wayne County (northeast)
- Orchard Township, Wayne County (east)
- Hickory Hill Township, Wayne County (southeast)
- Farrington Township, Jefferson County (south)
- Field Township, Jefferson County (southwest)
- Haines Township (west)
- Stevenson Township (northwest)
