= June 1990 Lower Ohio Valley tornado outbreak =

Severe windstorms in the Midwestern United States

1990 Ohio Valley tornado outbreak
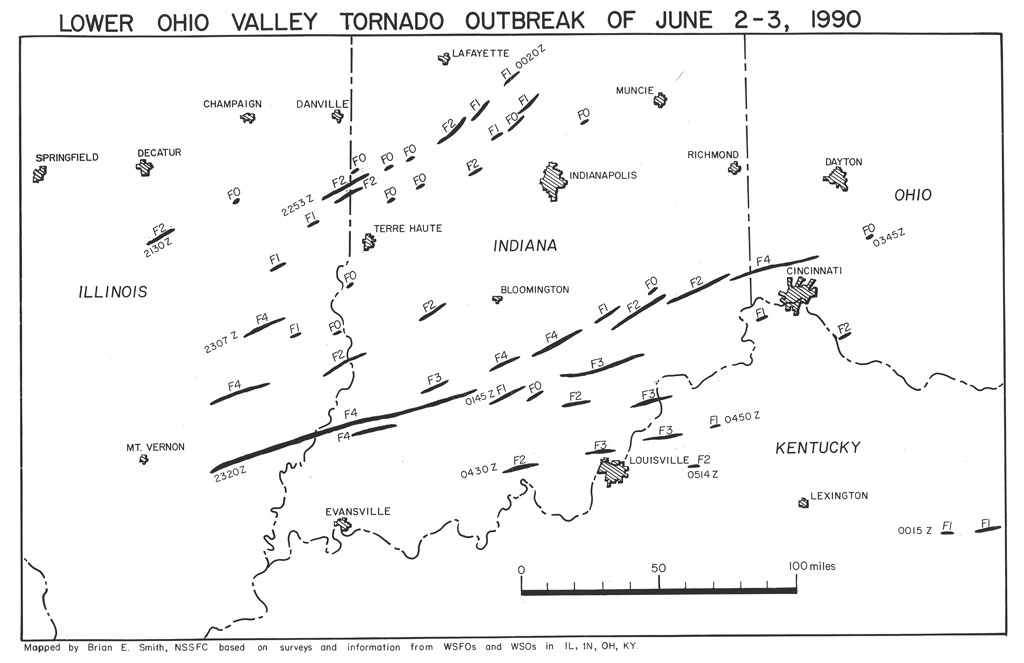
- Tornado tracks for tornadoes under NWS Indianapolis coverage on June 2, 1990.

Meteorological history
- Duration: June 2–3, 1990

Tornado outbreak
- Tornadoes: 65
- Max. rating: F4 tornado

Overall effects
- Fatalities: 9
- Injuries: 253
- Damage: Unknown
- Areas affected: Midwestern United States
- Part of the tornado outbreaks of 1990

The June 1990 Lower Ohio Valley tornado outbreak spawned 65 tornadoes, including seven of F4 intensity, in southern Illinois, central and southern Indiana, southwestern Ohio, and northern Kentucky on June 2–3, 1990.

In Indiana, 37 tornadoes formed, breaking the single-day record of 21 set during the Super Outbreak on April 3, 1974.

== Meteorological synopsis ==
On June 2, an unseasonably intense surface low over eastern North Dakota brought with it a cold front across the Mississippi Valley. Ahead of the front, a highly unstable air mass combined with a strong jet stream that increased the synoptic-scale lifting favoring supercell development. Meanwhile, backed southerly low-level winds brought moist dew points well into the region. The National Severe Storms Forecast Center in Norman, Oklahoma, put out a high risk for severe weather over much of Illinois, Indiana, Ohio, and northern Kentucky. A notable feature of this outbreak is that there was a sector of weak tornadoes north of Terre Haute, Indiana, while a sector of strong and vicious tornadoes developed south of the city.

== Confirmed tornadoes ==
Confirmed tornadoes by Fujita rating
FU	F0	F1	F2	F3	F4	F5	Total
0	16	21	17	5	7	0	66

=== June 2 event ===
List of confirmed tornadoes – Saturday, June 2, 1990 (Note: All dates are based on the local time zone where the tornado touched down; however, all times are in Coordinated Universal Time for consistency.)
F#	Location	County / Parish	State	Date	Start Coord.	Time (UTC)	Path length	Max width	Summary
F0	SW of Cantril	Van Buren	IA	June 2	40.6186°N 92.1030°W	16:35	0.5 mi (0.80 km)		Minor damage reported to a farm.
F1	S of Greenwood	Sebastian	AR	June 2	35.1795°N 94.2671°W	17:00	2 mi (3.2 km)		Roof damage to homes and outbuildings with severe damage to 29 homes.
F2	SW of Manchester	Van Buren, Delaware	IA	June 2	42.4313°N 91.5496°W	17:43	10.5 mi (16.9 km)		Tornado struck a building housing 500 hogs, killing two of them.
F1	S of Goodhue	Goodhue	MN	June 2	44.3657°N 92.6286°W	17:50	4 mi (6.4 km)		A barn was destroyed but without damage to the equipment inside. The tornado also uprooted trees and damaged three farm sites.
F1	Flat Gap area	Johnson	KY	June 2	37.9346°N 82.8898°W	19:00	1 mi (1.6 km)		This tornado destroyed a food market and a mobile home.
F1	S of Maquoketa	Jackson	IA	June 2	42.0343°N 90.6837°W	20:12	1 mi (1.6 km)		Trees snapped and transported 100 yards (300 ft). One shed was slightly damaged as a door was ripped off and the power cut off.
F2	Westervelt to Findlay	Shelby	IL	June 2	39.4798°N 88.8643°W	21:30	8 mi (13 km)		Tornado struck Findlay, where 16 homes were destroyed and 60 others were damaged. Two people were injured.
F0	SW of Arcola	Douglas	IL	June 2	39.6580°N 88.3789°W	21:47	0.5 mi (0.80 km)		No damage reported.
F2	SW of Fond du Lac area	Fond du Lac	WI	June 2	43.7549°N 88.4650°W	22:00	1 mi (1.6 km)		Caused $2 million in damage to an industrial park, several businesses, and a farm. A woman was cut by flying glass when her vehicle was struck by a billboard.
F1	SE of La Grange	Walworth	WI	June 2	42.7845°N 88.6278°W	22:00	0.2 mi (0.32 km)		Four homes damaged along with trees near Lauderdale Lake.
F1	N of Casey	Cumberland, Clark	IL	June 2	39.3272°N 88.013°W	2205	0.5 mi (0.80 km)		A mobile home was destroyed and trees were damaged.
F0	NW of Dana	Vermillion	IN	June 2	39.8253°N 87.5221°W	22:15	1 mi (1.6 km)		Brief touchdown. No damage was found from this tornado.
F0	NW of Annapolis	Parke	IN	June 2	39.8713°N 87.2657°W	22:23	0.5 mi (0.80 km)		Brief tornado damaged trees.
F0	SW of Byron	Parke	IN	June 2	39.8962°N 87.1177°W	22:28	0.2 mi (0.32 km)		Brief tornado along with the Annapolis event. One porch was damaged.
F1	Grandview area	Edgar	IL	June 2	39.5402°N 87.8688°W	22:30	8 mi (13 km)		Four homes were unroofed and two others were damaged.
F0	S of Catlin	Parke	IN	June 2	39.6870°N 87.2357°W	22:45	0.5 mi (0.80 km)		Minor tree damage occurred near Raccoon Lake.
F4	Rinard to S of Olney	Wayne, Clay, Richland	IL	June 2	38.5678°N 88.4688°W	22:45	23 mi (37 km)		Three mobile homes were destroyed, including two that were completely disintegrated. A permanent home was also destroyed, and heavy oil tanks were rolled. Two injuries occurred when a tree fell onto a pickup truck.
F0	W of Fairbanks	Sullivan	IN	June 2	39.2203°N 87.5377°W	22:45	0.1 mi (0.16 km)		Brief tornado. No damage noted.
F2	S of Crawfordsville to SE of Darlington	Montgomery	IN	June 2	40.0201°N 86.8909°W	22:50	10 mi (16 km)		14 homes and two mobile homes were badly damaged, with nearby barns leveled. A truck was blown from I-74. Twelve people were injured.
F2	SW of Horace, IL to E of Dana, IN	Edgar (IL), Vermillion (IN)	IL, IN	June 2	39.7035°N 87.7677°W	22:53	17.5 mi (28.2 km)		Three farms were damaged, including one where all outbuildings were destroyed and the farmhouse sustained major damage. Trees were also damaged.
F2	NE of Paris, IL to St. Bernice, IN	Edgar (IL), Vermillion (IN)	IL, IN	June 2	39.6521°N 87.7328°W	22:58	8 mi (13 km)		Tornado struck St. Bernice, where 20 homes were damaged and an old brick school building was leveled.
F0	S of Hollandsburg	Parke	IN	June 2	39.7550°N 87.0722°W	23:00	0.2 mi (0.32 km)		Brief tornado.
F4	Newton area	Jasper	IL	June 2	38.9639°N 88.2181°W	23:07	12.5 mi (20.1 km)		Seven homes near Newton Lake were leveled to the ground. Two other homes were destroyed with minor damage elsewhere.
F1	W of Thorntown to SE of Colfax	Boone	IN	June 2	40.1354°N 86.6822°W	23:10	4.5 mi (7.2 km)		Windows were smashed with some damage to trees. Two barns were leveled.
F0	Georgetown	Cass	IN	June 2	38.3005°N 85.9693°W	23:10	0.1 mi (0.16 km)		Brief tornado hit Georgetown.
F1	S of Pomeroyton	Menifee	KY	June 2	37.8626°N 83.5233°W	23:15	2 mi (3.2 km)		Destroyed a single home with other structures damaged nearby.
F3	SW of Montgomery to N of Loogootee	Daviess, Martin	IN	June 2	38.6532°N 87.0525°W	23:19	7 mi (11 km)		Metal high-tension towers blown were down, businesses were unroofed, and eight homes were damaged.
F4	N of Aden, IL to Mt. Carmel, IL to N of Petersburg, IN to SE of Huron, IN	Hamilton (IL), Wayne (IL), Edwards (IL), Wabash (IL), Knox (IN), Gibson (IN), Pike (IN), Daviess (IN), Martin (IN), Orange (IN), Lawrence (IN)	IL, IN	June 2	38.2417°N 88.4156°W	23:20	106 mi (171 km)		1 death — See section on this tornado — 11 people were injured.
F1	Oblong area	Jasper, Crawford	IL	June 2	38.9973°N 87.9055°W	23:20	3 mi (4.8 km)		Damaged grain-storage bins and a garage before dissipating.
F1	Grassy Creek to Cottle	Morgan	KY	June 2	37.8659°N 83.3448°W	23:25	6 mi (9.7 km)		Uprooted trees and damaged seven structures.
F1	SE of Frankfort to Michigantown area	Clinton	IN	June 2	40.2595°N 86.4837°W	23:25	6 mi (9.7 km)		Damage to the roof of The Red Barn theater near Frankfort.
F2	WNW of Switz City to E of Worthington	Greene	IN	June 2	39.0734°N 87.0701°W	23:30	10 mi (16 km)		Destroyed four homes with others damaged. Trees were snapped and farm buildings were damaged as well. Tornado killed several hogs and 50 rabbits on one farm alone.
F1	SSE of Lebanon	Boone	IN	June 2	39.9993°N 86.4417°W	23:35	0.5 mi (0.80 km)		Hit two hangars and six planes at the Boone County Airport with losses of $200,000.
F0	W of Gadsden	Boone	IN	June 2	40.0463°N 86.3814°W	23:37	6 mi (9.7 km)		Developed just after the previous event, resulting in minor damage to barns, treetops, and limbs along its path.
F0	S of Palestine	Crawford	IL	June 2	38.9719°N 87.6219°W	23:40	3 mi (4.8 km)		Little to no damage was found from this weak, brief tornado.
F1	ESE of Elizaville	Boone	IN	June 2	40.1005°N 86.3677°W	23:43	7 mi (11 km)		Developed just to the north of the previous event. Also caused minor damage to barns and vegetation.
F2	S of Pinkstaff, IL to WSW of Oaktown, IN	Lawrence (IL), Knox (IN)	IL, IN	June 2	38.7779°N 87.6730°W	23:45	5 mi (8.0 km)		Tornado destroyed a mobile home and farm. A man was injured when he hid under a tractor, which was lifted and dropped onto his leg.
F4	NE of Bryantsville to ENE of Bedford	Lawrence	IN	June 2	38.7855°N 86.5636°W	23:50	11 mi (18 km)		1 death — Leveled several businesses alongside U.S. Route 50 and State Road 37, then went on to destroy trailers, metal high-tension structures, trees, and cabins in the Bedford area. A total of 12 homes and 29 trailers destroyed.
F1	NW of Oxbow	Newaygo	MI	June 2		23:59	1.5 mi (2.4 km)		
F4	W of Union to Alford	Gibson, Pike	IN	June 2	38.4395°N 87.5132°W	00:17	13 mi (21 km)		6 deaths — See section on this tornado — 60 additional people were injured.
F0	NNE of Noblesville	Hamilton	IN	June 2	40.0764°N 85.9844°W	00:20	0.2 mi (0.32 km)		Uprooted two trees during a brief touchdown.
F2	New Maysville to S of North Salem	Putnam, Hendricks	IN	June 2	39.7928°N 86.7352°W	00:30	3.5 mi (5.6 km)		1 death — One death occurred in a destroyed mobile home. Tornado also damaged another mobile home, a farm, and a house. Six people were injured.
F1	Hanover area	Jackson	MI	June 2	42.0984°N 84.5511°W	00:30	0.5 mi (0.80 km)		
F2	W of Merriam	Noble	IN	June 2	41.2899°N 85.4896°W	00:40	3.5 mi (5.6 km)		Destroyed two mobile homes and three barns plus a silo. Also severely damaged a third mobile home and displaced a fourth barn.
F1	W of Orleans	Orange	IN	June 2	38.6654°N 86.5005°W	00:54	11.5 mi (18.5 km)		
F1	E of Reddington	Jackson, Jennings	IN	June 2	39.0400°N 85.7616°W	00:55	10 mi (16 km)		
F2	NE of Fleming to NE of Zenas	Jennings	IN	June 2	38.9932°N 85.7941°W	01:05	18 mi (29 km)		
F2	N of Guthrie to NE of Dexter	Washtenaw	MI	June 2	42.3311°N 84.0761°W	01:10	15 mi (24 km)		
F0	NW of Millhousen	Decatur	IN	June 2	39.2361°N 85.4639°W	01:15	0.1 mi (0.16 km)		
F0	Campbellsburg area	Washington	IN	June 2	38.6544°N 86.2822°W	01:17	3.5 mi (5.6 km)		
F4	SW of Clear Spring to NW of Seymour	Jackson	IN	June 2	38.9093°N 86.2281°W	01:20	18 mi (29 km)		Hundreds of trees and ten homes leveled to the ground. 44 homes damaged and 11 mobile homes destroyed with many farms damaged or destroyed. Nine people were injured.
F2	SE of Salem to NW of South Boston	Washington	IN	June 2	38.5731°N 86.0663°W	02:03	4.5 mi (7.2 km)		Seven trailers and a barn were destroyed. 15 trailers and several frame homes were damaged as well.
F3	S of Millport to NE of Lancaster	Washington, Jackson, Scott, Jefferson	IN	June 2	38.7505°N 86.1023°W	02:25	41 mi (66 km)		One home was destroyed and 15 others were damaged.
F2	NE of Nebraska to SE of New Alsace	Ripley, Dearborn	IN	June 2	39.0947°N 85.4428°W	02:30	23 mi (37 km)		A church built in 1838 was destroyed.
F2	Riddle to N of Carefree	Crawford, Harrison	IN	June 2	38.2504°N 86.4296°W	02:30	11 mi (18 km)		Destroyed four homes and damaged numerous others; $260,000 in damage to three buildings at a food-processing plant.
F3	NW of Galena to Sellersburg	Floyd, Clark	IN	June 2	38.3612°N 85.9525°W	02:57	12 mi (19 km)		Tornado first struck Floyds Knobs and Hamburg, destroying over 25 homes and mobile homes. In Sellersburg, the tornado badly damaged a bowling alley and many businesses.
F4	W of Bright, IN to SW of Mason, OH	Dearborn (IN), Hamilton (OH), Butler (OH), Warren (OH)	IN, OH	June 2	39.2180°N 84.8657°W	03:00	33 mi (53 km)		See section on this tornado — 37 people were injured.
F0	SE of Clarkedale	Crittenden	AR	June 2	35.2998°N 90.2001°W	03:05	0.1 mi (0.16 km)		Brief touchdown sighted with no reported damage.
F3	La Grange area to Jericho	Oldham, Henry	KY	June 2	38.4110°N 85.3888°W	03:30	14 mi (23 km)		First clipped the north side of La Grange, where three frame homes and three mobile homes were destroyed. Tornado then struck Jericho, damaging several other homes. Caused $2,500,000 in damage and injured 5 people.
F3	SE of Marysville, IN to NE of Bedford, KY	Clark (IN), Jefferson (IN), Trimble (KY)	IN, KY	June 2	38.5620°N 85.6214°W	03:40	17 mi (27 km)		Half-mile wide tornado badly damaged many buildings, homes, and trailers in Indiana. Tornado crossed into Kentucky and struck Mt. Pleasant, where 15 homes and 25 barns were damaged. Five people were injured. This tornado followed a similar path to a devastating EF4 tornado that killed 11 people during an outbreak on March 2, 2012.
F2	N of Shelbyville	Shelby	KY	June 2	38.2482°N 85.2288°W	04:14	3 mi (4.8 km)		Damaged 16 homes and 12 barns on the north edge of Shelbyville. Caused $1,000,000 in damage.
F1	Allensville to Corinth	Logan	KY	June 2	36.7302°N 87.0355°W	04:34	11 mi (18 km)		Damaged outbuildings and a partially completed home.
F1	S of Burlington	Boone	KY	June 2	39.0234°N 84.7269°W	04:40	0.7 mi (1.1 km)		Major damage to four homes in the area.
F1	S of Franklinton	Henry	KY	June 2	38.4393°N 85.0587°W	04:55	1 mi (1.6 km)		Damaged many homes and a barn.
F0	Clarksville area	Clinton	OH	June 2	39.4043°N 83.9797°W	04:45	1 mi (1.6 km)		Damaged only two homes and some trees.
F2	SW of Saltair	Clermont	OH	June 3	38.9221°N 84.1561°W	5:50	4 mi (6.4 km)		Three mobile homes and numerous barns were destroyed. Five homes and other barns were damaged.

=== Barnhill–Albion, Illinois/Mt. Carmel–Shoals, Indiana ===
Barnhill–Albion, Illinois/Mt. Carmel–Shoals, Indiana
- The tornado as seen approaching the town of Albion, Illinois.

Meteorological history
- Date: June 2, 1990
- Formed: June 2, 1990; 5:20 p.m. CDT (UTC–05:00)
- Dissipated: June 2, 1990; 7:53 p.m. CDT (UTC–05:00)
- Duration: 1 hour, 33 minutes

F4 tornado
- on the Fujita scale
- Highest winds: 207–260 mph (333–418 km/h)

Overall effects
- Fatalities: 1
- Injuries: 11

This extremely long-tracked F4 tornado began near Aden, littering I-64 with trees and overturning a truck before striking Barnhill, where 10 homes were destroyed and 10 others were damaged. The tornado then struck Albion, where a factory, homes, and other buildings were destroyed. The tornado then caused severe damage in the Browns area, where one woman was killed in her home. In the town of Mt. Carmel, the tornado ripped apart seventeen homes and severely damaged Wabash Valley College before crossing into Indiana. In Indiana, the tornado passed near Hazleton, Bowman, Petersburg, and Orrville, where a barn was destroyed. In Daviess County, Indiana, the tornado caused $10,000,000 in damage as it destroyed 10 homes and damaged 35 others. A cabin was crushed by a tree as the tornado passed near Shoals, resulting in four injuries. The tornado passed near Whitfield before dissipating near Huron. A total of eleven people were injured by this tornado.

=== Petersburg, Indiana ===
Petersburg, Indiana
- The tornado approaching Petersburg, Indiana

Meteorological history
- Date: June 2, 1990
- Formed: June 2, 1990; 8:17 p.m. CDT (UTC–05:00)
- Dissipated: June 2, 1990; 8:35 p.m. CDT (UTC–05:00)
- Duration: 18 minutes

F4 tornado
- on the Fujita scale
- Highest winds: 207–260 mph (333–418 km/h)

Overall effects
- Fatalities: 6
- Injuries: 60

A powerful F4 tornado developed west of Union and proceeded to enter that community from Gibson County. The tornado completely leveled one home, killing two occupants, and also blew another 30 feet (9.1 m) off its base. After passing through a wooded area, the tornado hit Petersburg, killing four people there. Upon entering the town limits, it leveled a nursing home plus an apartment complex and up to ten homes. Having now killed six people, the tornado was the deadliest to hit Indiana since the 1974 Super Outbreak. It then struck the business district in downtown Petersburg and destroyed 19 businesses before going on to level 168 additional homes and damage an elementary school in Petersburg. The town became the hardest hit in Indiana on June 2, 1990. The tornado destroyed half of Petersburg, including the home of the mayor. 60 others were injured by this tornado.

=== Bright, Indiana/Harrison, Ohio ===
Bright, Indiana/Harrison, Ohio
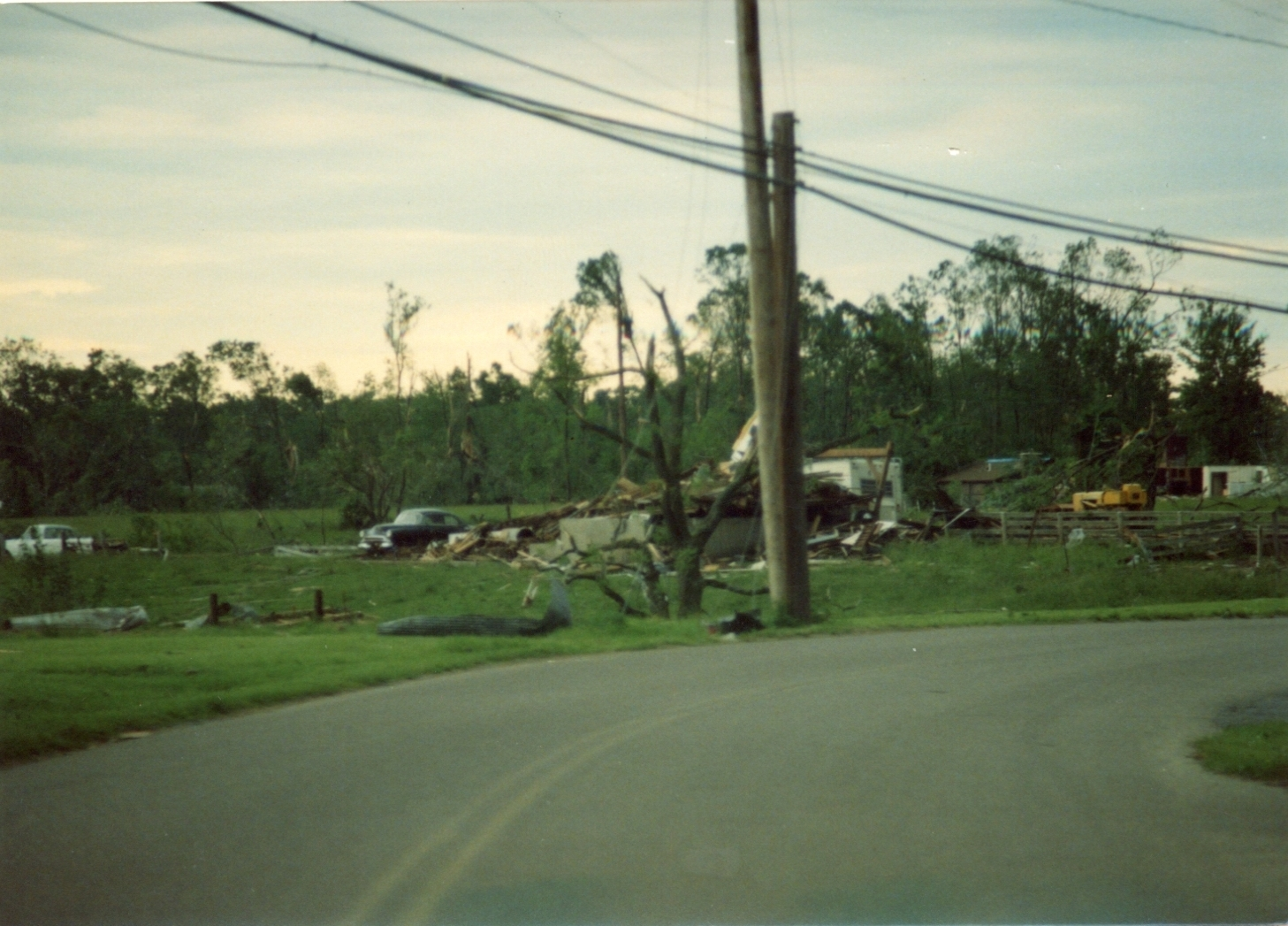
- Damage in Harrison, Ohio.

Meteorological history
- Date: June 2, 1990
- Formed: June 2, 1990; 11:00 p.m. CDT (UTC–05:00)
- Dissipated: June 2, 1990; 11:45 p.m. CDT (UTC–05:00)
- Duration: 45 minutes

F4 tornado
- on the Fujita scale
- Highest winds: 207–260 mph (333–418 km/h)

Overall effects
- Injuries: 37

A violent nighttime tornado began west of Bright, Indiana, with 50 homes destroyed in that area. Four of the homes were of brick construction, yet were completely leveled. The tornado then continued to produce F4 damage in Ohio as it hit the communities of Harrison, Crosby Township, and New Baltimore. In Hamilton County alone, the tornado damaged 800–900 homes and 31 businesses plus three schools; of these, 32 homes were reported destroyed, some so completely that their foundations were left "practically barren". Steel beams, 18 inches (1.5 ft) wide, 75 feet (23 m) long, and 5/8 inch (0.052 ft) in thickness, were deformed and brought to ground level in Harrison. The tornado continued into the southern part of Fairfield and surrounding areas of Butler County, where 19 homes and four trailers were destroyed, with 58 homes, 22 trailers, and five apartment buildings damaged. The tornado continued into Warren County before dissipating near Mason. A total of 37 people were injured by this tornado.

== Aftermath ==
Outbreak death toll
State	Deaths Total	County	County total
Illinois	1	Edwards	1
Indiana	8	Lawrence	1
Indiana	8	Pike	6
Indiana	8	Putnam	1
Totals	9		
All deaths were tornado-related

People erected makeshift shelters in Petersburg as Indiana declared a state of emergency. The tornado outbreak was the most destructive to hit Indiana since the Super Outbreak in 1974. Across Indiana, Illinois, and Kentucky, the entire outbreak resulted in 313 homes destroyed, 76% of them in Indiana alone, and 892 damaged, fully 75% of them in Indiana.

== See also ==
- List of North American tornadoes and tornado outbreaks
- List of Storm Prediction Center high risk days
