= Iuka Township, Marion County, Illinois =

Iuka Township
- Township

- Location of Illinois in the United States
- Coordinates: 38°36′N 88°45′W
- Country: United States
- State: Illinois
- County: Marion
- Settled: November 4, 1873

Area
  - Total: 36.02 sq mi (93.3 km^{2})
  - Land: 35.96 sq mi (93.1 km^{2})
  - Water: 0.06 sq mi (0.16 km^{2})
- Elevation: 459 ft (140 m)

Population (2010)
  - Estimate (2016): 964
  - Density: 27.8/sq mi (10.7/km^{2})
- Time zone: UTC-6 (CST)
  - Summer (DST): UTC-5 (CDT)
- FIPS code: 17-121-37946

Iuka Township is located in Marion County, Illinois. As of the 2010 census, its population was 999 and it contained 443 housing units.

== Geography ==
Iuka Township (T2N R4E) is centered at 38°38'N 88°45'W (38.636,-88.758). It is traversed east–west by U.S. Route 50. According to the 2010 census, the township has a total area of 36.02 square miles (93.3 km^{2}), of which 35.96 square miles (93.1 km^{2}) (or 99.83%) is land and 0.06 square miles (0.16 km^{2}) (or 0.17%) is water.

== Demographics ==
Historical population
Census	Pop.	Note	%±
2016 (est.)	964
U.S. Decennial Census

== Adjacent townships ==
- Omega Township (north)
- Songer Township, Clay County (northeast)
- Hickory Hill Township, Wayne County (northeast)
- Garden Hill Township, Wayne County (east)
- Orchard Township, Wayne County (southeast)
- Romine Township (south)
- Haines Township (southwest)
- Stevenson Township (west)
- Alma Township (northwest)
