= Webber Township, Jefferson County, Illinois =

Webber Township
- Township
- Location in Jefferson County

- Jefferson County's location in Illinois
- Coordinates: 38°20′N 88°45′W
- Country: United States
- State: Illinois
- County: Jefferson

Area
  - Total: 37.21 sq mi (96.4 km^{2})
  - Land: 37.00 sq mi (95.8 km^{2})
  - Water: 0.21 sq mi (0.54 km^{2}) 0.56%
- Elevation: 489 ft (149 m)

Population (2020)
  - Total: 2,104
  - Density: 56.86/sq mi (21.96/km^{2})
- Time zone: UTC-6 (CST)
  - Summer (DST): UTC-5 (CDT)
- ZIP codes: 62814, 62864, 62872
- FIPS code: 17-081-79514

Webber Township is one of sixteen townships in Jefferson County, Illinois, USA. As of the 2020 census, its population was 2,104 and it contained 910 housing units.

== Geography ==
According to the 2021 census gazetteer files, Webber Township has a total area of 37.21 square miles (96.37 km^{2}), of which 37.00 square miles (95.83 km^{2}) (or 99.44%) is land and 0.21 square miles (0.54 km^{2}) (or 0.56%) is water. The township is centered at 38°20′N 88°45′W (38.342,-88.757). It is traversed from east to west by State Route 15.

=== Cities, towns, villages ===
- Bluford

=== Unincorporated towns ===
- Markham City at 38.330°N 88.722°W
- Marlow at 38.321°N 88.793°W

(This list is based on USGS data and may include former settlements.)

=== Adjacent townships ===
- Farrington Township (north)
- Hickory Hill Township, Wayne County (northeast)
- Four Mile Township, Wayne County (east)
- Pendleton Township (south)
- Mt. Vernon Township (west)
- Field Township (northwest)

=== Cemeteries ===
The township contains these seven cemeteries: Black Oak Ridge, Clark, East Hickory Hill, Hicory Hill, Mount Olive, Newton Farm and Oak Dale.

=== Major highways ===
- Illinois Route 15

== Demographics ==
As of the 2020 census there were 2,104 people, 855 households, and 613 families residing in the township. The population density was 56.54 inhabitants per square mile (21.83/km^{2}). There were 910 housing units at an average density of 24.46 per square mile (9.44/km^{2}). The racial makeup of the township was 95.29% White, 0.29% African American, 0.05% Native American, 0.62% Asian, 0.00% Pacific Islander, 0.24% from other races, and 3.52% from two or more races. Hispanic or Latino of any race were 1.05% of the population.

There were 855 households, out of which 34.00% had children under the age of 18 living with them, 58.60% were married couples living together, 9.59% had a female householder with no spouse present, and 28.30% were non-families. 26.10% of all households were made up of individuals, and 12.00% had someone living alone who was 65 years of age or older. The average household size was 2.52 and the average family size was 3.03.

The township's age distribution consisted of 23.5% under the age of 18, 8.0% from 18 to 24, 22.9% from 25 to 44, 25% from 45 to 64, and 20.5% who were 65 years of age or older. The median age was 40.8 years. For every 100 females, there were 96.3 males. For every 100 females age 18 and over, there were 96.9 males.

The median income for a household in the township was $54,950, and the median income for a family was $59,743. Males had a median income of $42,078 versus $26,597 for females. The per capita income for the township was $29,205. About 8.6% of families and 9.7% of the population were below the poverty line, including 14.4% of those under age 18 and 1.4% of those age 65 or over.

Historical population
Census	Pop.	Note	%±
2000	2,339		—
2010	2,323		−0.7%
2020	2,104		−9.4%
U.S. Decennial Census

== Political districts ==
- Illinois's 19th congressional district
- State House District 107
- State Senate District 54
