= Raccoon Lake (Illinois) =

Coordinates: 38.543°N 89.086°W

- Interactive map of Raccoon Lake
- Location: Marion County, Illinois, United States
- Type: Reservoir
- Primary inflows: Raccoon Creek
- Primary outflows: Crooked Creek
- Basin countries: United States
- Surface area: 970 acres (390 ha)
- Average depth: 3.9 ft (1.2 m)
- Shore length^{1}: 16.4 miles (26.4 kilometers)
- ^{1} Shore length is not a well-defined measure.

Raccoon Lake, also called Raccoon Creek Reservoir, is a reservoir in Marion County, Illinois. Served by Illinois Route 161, it is 2 miles (3 km) northeast of the Illinois city of Centralia. The reservoir is 970 acres in size, has a shoreline length of 16.4 miles, and possesses an average water depth of 3.9 feet.

== Description ==
Raccoon Lake was built by Centralia for water-supply purposes, and was completed in 1942. Centralia, which continues to own and operate the lake, works with the Illinois Department of Natural Resources (IDNR) to stock it with fish. There is a partially ADA-compliant fishing dock. The IDNR reports that lake fishing includes largemouth bass, channel catfish, white and black crappies, and bluegill. The lake also contains carps and yellow bullhead. The marina and boat ramp are located on the south side of the lake near Country Club Road, and there are no restrictions on boat fishing or power.

The lake is located in Centralia Township, and portions of the shoreline has been developed as residential real estate. Fed by Raccoon Creek, Illinois, the reservoir's waters flow into Crooked Creek and, from there, into the Kaskaskia River. The nearest limited-access highway exist is Exit 109 on Interstate 57.
