= Farrington Township, Jefferson County, Illinois =

Farrington Township
- Township
- Location in Jefferson County

- Jefferson County's location in Illinois
- Coordinates: 38°26′N 88°45′W
- Country: United States
- State: Illinois
- County: Jefferson

Area
  - Total: 36.74 sq mi (95.2 km^{2})
  - Land: 36.67 sq mi (95.0 km^{2})
  - Water: 0.07 sq mi (0.18 km^{2}) 0.20%
- Elevation: 472 ft (144 m)

Population (2020)
  - Total: 599
  - Density: 16.3/sq mi (6.31/km^{2})
- Time zone: UTC-6 (CST)
  - Summer (DST): UTC-5 (CDT)
- ZIP codes: 62814, 62851, 62864, 62889
- FIPS code: 17-081-25648

Farrington Township is one of sixteen townships in Jefferson County, Illinois, USA. As of the 2020 census, its population was 599 and it contained 246 housing units.

== Geography ==
According to the 2021 census gazetteer files, Farrington Township has a total area of 36.74 square miles (95.16 km^{2}), of which 36.67 square miles (94.97 km^{2}) (or 99.80%) is land and 0.07 square miles (0.18 km^{2}) (or 0.20%) is water. The township is centered at 38°26'N 88°45′W (38.429,-88.757).

=== Unincorporated towns ===
- Harmony at 38.407°N 88.793°W
- Shields at 38.468°N 88.713°W
- Stratton at 38.446°N 88.713°W

(This list is based on USGS data and may include former settlements.)

=== Extinct towns ===
- Pigeon at 38.395°N 88.756°W

(These towns are listed as "historical" by the USGS.)

=== Adjacent townships ===
- Romine Township, Marion County (north)
- Orchard Township, Wayne County (northeast)
- Hickory Hill Township, Wayne County (east)
- Webber Township (south)
- Mount Vernon Township (southwest)
- Field Township (west)
- Haines Township, Marion County (northwest)

=== Cemeteries ===
The township contains these eight cemeteries: Falley, Greenwalt, Harmony, Lowery, McConnaughhay, Mifflin, Mount Zion and Wells Chapel.

== Demographics ==
As of the 2020 census there were 599 people, 188 households, and 123 families residing in the township. The population density was 16.30 inhabitants per square mile (6.29/km^{2}). There were 246 housing units at an average density of 6.70 per square mile (2.59/km^{2}). The racial makeup of the township was 95.33% White, 0.17% African American, 0.00% Native American, 0.50% Asian, 0.00% Pacific Islander, 0.17% from other races, and 3.84% from two or more races. Hispanic or Latino of any race were 1.00% of the population.

There were 188 households, out of which 25.50% had children under the age of 18 living with them, 56.91% were married couples living together, 1.60% had a female householder with no spouse present, and 34.57% were non-families. 29.80% of all households were made up of individuals, and 14.90% had someone living alone who was 65 years of age or older. The average household size was 2.38 and the average family size was 2.97.

The township's age distribution consisted of 23.5% under the age of 18, 8.1% from 18 to 24, 19% from 25 to 44, 32.3% from 45 to 64, and 17.2% who were 65 years of age or older. The median age was 43.5 years. For every 100 females, there were 123.5 males. For every 100 females age 18 and over, there were 134.2 males.

The median income for a household in the township was $65,000, and the median income for a family was $81,042. Males had a median income of $42,917 versus $20,313 for females. The per capita income for the township was $29,898. About 0.0% of families and 2.9% of the population were below the poverty line, including 0.0% of those under age 18 and 1.3% of those age 65 or over.

Historical population
Census	Pop.	Note	%±
2000	580		—
2010	567		−2.2%
2020	599		5.6%
U.S. Decennial Census

== School districts ==
- Farrington Grade School

== Political districts ==
- Illinois' 19th congressional district
- State House District 107
- State Senate District 54
