= Wamac, Illinois =

- City
- Location in Clinton County, Illinois
- Coordinates: 38°30′11″N 89°08′40″W
- Country: United States
- State: Illinois
- Counties: Washington, Marion, Clinton
- Townships: Irvington, Centralia, Brookside

Government
  - Mayor: Jackie Butch Mathus, Jr.

Area
  - Total: 1.42 sq mi (3.69 km^{2})
  - Land: 1.41 sq mi (3.66 km^{2})
  - Water: 0.012 sq mi (0.03 km^{2})
- Elevation: 499 ft (152 m)

Population (2020)
  - Total: 985
  - Density: 696.1/sq mi (268.77/km^{2})
- Time zone: UTC-6 (CST)
  - Summer (DST): UTC-5 (CDT)
- ZIP code: 62801 (Centralia)
- Area code: 618
- FIPS code: 17-78721
- GNIS feature ID: 2397187
- Website: wamac.illinois.gov

Wamac is a city in Washington, Marion, and Clinton counties in the U.S. state of Illinois. The population was 985 at the 2020 census, down from 1,185 in 2010. Incorporated as a city on July 25, 1916, Wamac derives its name from the three counties.

== Geography ==
The city is mainly in the northeast corner of Washington County and the southwest corner of Marion County, with a small portion in the southeast corner of Clinton County. It is bordered to the north and east by Centralia. U.S. Route 51 passes just east of Wamac, leading north to the center of Centralia and south 38 miles (61 km) to Du Quoin.

According to the 2021 census gazetteer files, Wamac has a total area of 1.43 square miles (3.70 km^{2}), of which 1.42 square miles (3.68 km^{2}) (or 99.23%) are land and 0.01 square miles (0.03 km^{2}) (or 0.77%) are water. Fulton Branch passes through the south side of the city, flowing west to Sewer Creek, part of the Crooked Creek watershed flowing west to the Kaskaskia River.

== Demographics ==
Historical population
Census	Pop.	Note	%±
1920	1,180		—
1930	1,232		4.4%
1940	1,432		16.2%
1950	1,429		−0.2%
1960	1,394		−2.4%
1970	1,347		−3.4%
1980	1,665		23.6%
1990	1,501		−9.8%
2000	1,378		−8.2%
2010	1,185		−14.0%
2020	985		−16.9%
U.S. Decennial Census

As of the 2020 census there were 985 people, 503 households, and 338 families residing in the city. The population density was 690.74 inhabitants per square mile (266.70/km^{2}). There were 478 housing units at an average density of 335.20 per square mile (129.42/km^{2}). The racial makeup of the city was 86.09% White, 4.16% African American, 0.30% Native American, 0.30% Asian, 0.10% Pacific Islander, 1.42% from other races, and 7.61% from two or more races. Hispanic or Latino of any race were 3.55% of the population.

There were 503 households, out of which 30.8% had children under the age of 18 living with them, 29.42% were married couples living together, 19.09% had a female householder with no husband present, and 32.80% were non-families. 26.84% of all households were made up of individuals, and 6.96% had someone living alone who was 65 years of age or older. The average household size was 2.91 and the average family size was 2.43.

The city's age distribution consisted of 27.1% under the age of 18, 9.3% from 18 to 24, 26.7% from 25 to 44, 28% from 45 to 64, and 8.9% who were 65 years of age or older. The median age was 33.9 years. For every 100 females, there were 106.8 males. For every 100 females age 18 and over, there were 105.8 males.

The median income for a household in the city was $32,625, and the median income for a family was $34,286. Males had a median income of $24,043 versus $25,250 for females. The per capita income for the city was $20,581. About 20.7% of families and 27.7% of the population were below the poverty line, including 39.9% of those under age 18 and 5.5% of those age 65 or over.
