= Lake Centralia =

Lake in Marion County, Illinois, United States

Coordinates: 38.559°N 88.994°W

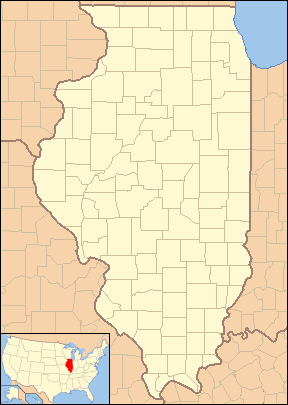
- Location within Illinois Location within the United States
- Interactive map of Lake Centralia
- Location: Marion County, Illinois
- Type: Reservoir
- River sources: Crooked Creek
- Basin countries: United States
- Managing agency: City of Centralia
- Built: 1910
- Surface area: 412 acres (167 ha)
- Average depth: 10 feet (3.0 m)
- Max. depth: 23 feet (7.0 m)
- Shore length^{1}: 12.9 miles (20.8 km)
- Surface elevation: 509 feet (155 m)
- Settlements: Centralia, Illinois
- References: U.S. Geological Survey Geographic Names Information System: Lake Centralia
- ^{1} Shore length is not a well-defined measure.

Lake Centralia is a reservoir in Marion County, Illinois. Served by rural roads, it is 8 miles (13 km) east of the Illinois city of Centralia. The reservoir is 412 acres (167 ha) in size, has a shoreline length of 12.9 miles (20.8 km), and possesses an average water depth of 10 feet (3.0 m). The city, which owns the lake for water-supply purposes, works with the Illinois Department of Natural Resources (IDNR) to stock it with fish. The IDNR reports that lake fishing specializes in stocked bass, including largemouth bass. The lake also offers channel catfish, white and black crappies, and bluegill. The marina is located on the north side of the lake, and there are no restrictions on boat fishing.

The lake is mostly located in Raccoon Township, with a small portion located in the adjacent Salem Township. Raccoon Township and Raccoon Creek, which feeds the nearby Raccoon Creek Reservoir, are a reminder of the area's wetland heritage from long ago. The city's contractors dammed a feeder of Crooked Creek, a tributary of the Kaskaskia River, to build the Lake Centralia reservoir in 1910. The reservoir is served by Exit 116 on Interstate 57 in Salem Township.
