= Big Mound =

Big Mound may refer to:

- The Battle of Big Mound, a United States Army victory in July 1863 over Native American tribes in the Dakota Territory
- Big Mound City, Florida
- Big Mound Township, Wayne County, Illinois
