= Alma, Illinois =

- Village
- Interactive map of Alma, Illinois
- Coordinates: 38°43′22″N 88°54′42″W
- Country: United States
- State: Illinois
- County: Marion
- Township: Alma
- Established: 1854

Area
  - Total: 1.13 sq mi (2.93 km^{2})
  - Land: 1.13 sq mi (2.93 km^{2})
  - Water: 0 sq mi (0.00 km^{2})
- Elevation: 627 ft (191 m)

Population (2020)
  - Total: 318
  - Density: 280.8/sq mi (108.42/km^{2})
- Time zone: UTC-6 (CST)
  - Summer (DST): UTC-5 (CDT)
- ZIP code: 62807
- Area code: 618
- FIPS code: 17-00919
- GNIS ID: 2397940

Alma is a village in Marion County, Illinois, United States. The population was 318 at the 2020 census.

== History ==
Alma was originally called "Rantoul", and under the latter name was laid out in 1854. The present name, adopted in 1855, commemorates the Battle of the Alma in the Crimean War. The village post office named "Grand Mound City" was changed to "Alma" in 1855 as well.

== Geography ==
Alma is located in northern Marion County. Illinois Route 37 passes through the village center, leading northeast 5 miles (8 km) to Kinmundy and south 7 miles (11 km) to Salem, the county seat. Interstate 57 touches the northwest corner of the village, with the closest access from Exit 127, 3 miles (5 km) to the north.

According to the U.S. Census Bureau, Alma has a total area of 1.13 square miles (2.93 km^{2}), all land. The village sits on a slight hilltop that drains north to Warren Branch, a tributary of the East Fork of the Kaskaskia River, and south to the headwaters of Crooked Creek, a west-flowing tributary of the Kaskaskia.

== Demographics ==
Historical population
Census	Pop.	Note	%±
1900	418		—
1910	380		−9.1%
1920	366		−3.7%
1930	334		−8.7%
1940	465		39.2%
1950	404		−13.1%
1960	358		−11.4%
1970	369		3.1%
1980	428		16.0%
1990	388		−9.3%
2000	386		−0.5%
2010	320		−17.1%
2020	318		−0.6%
U.S. Decennial Census

As of the census of 2000, 386 people, 167 households, and 101 families were residing in the village. The population density was 357.5 inhabitants per square mile (138.0/km^{2}). The 179 housing units were at an average density of 165.8 per square mile (64.0/km^{2}). The racial makeup of the village was 99.22% White, 0.26% African American and 0.52% Native American.

Of the 167 households, 29.3% had children under the age of 18 living with them, 45.5% were married couples living together, 8.4% had a female householder with no husband present, and 39.5% were non-families. 37.1% of all households were made up of individuals, and 18.6% had someone living alone who was 65 years of age or older. The average household size was 2.31 and the average family size was 3.06.

In the village, the population was spread out, with 25.4% under the age of 18, 9.1% from 18 to 24, 26.9% from 25 to 44, 21.2% from 45 to 64, and 17.4% who were 65 years of age or older. The median age was 38 years. For every 100 females, there were 97.9 males. For every 100 females age 18 and over, there were 90.7 males.

The median income for a household in the village was $27,083, and the median income for a family was $30,208. Males had a median income of $30,938 versus $17,308 for females. The per capita income for the village was $12,693. About 14.1% of families and 24.9% of the population were below the poverty line, including 37.1% of those under age 18 and 16.7% of those age 65 or over.
