= Field Township =

Field Township may refer to:

- Field Township, Jefferson County, Illinois
- Field Township, Minnesota
- Field, Ontario
