= Iuka, Illinois =

- Village
- Location in Marion County, Illinois
- Coordinates: 38°37′20″N 88°47′24″W
- Country: United States
- State: Illinois
- County: Marion
- Township: Iuka

Area
  - Total: 0.73 sq mi (1.90 km^{2})
  - Land: 0.73 sq mi (1.90 km^{2})
  - Water: 0 sq mi (0.00 km^{2})
- Elevation: 515 ft (157 m)

Population (2020)
  - Total: 512
  - Density: 698.2/sq mi (269.56/km^{2})
- Time zone: UTC-6 (CST)
  - Summer (DST): UTC-5 (CDT)
- ZIP code: 62849
- Area code: 618
- FIPS code: 17-37933
- GNIS ID: 2398283

Iuka is a village in Marion County, Illinois, United States. The population was 512 at the 2020 census.

== Geography ==
Iuka is located in eastern Marion County. U.S. Route 50 passes through the north side of the village, leading west 8 miles (13 km) to Salem, the county seat, and east 17 miles (27 km) to Flora.

According to the U.S. Census Bureau, Iuka has a total area of 0.73 square miles (1.89 km^{2}), of which 0.001 square miles (0.003 km^{2}), or 0.14%, are water. Jamison Creek crosses the north side of the village, running east to the Skillet Fork, a southeast-flowing tributary of the Little Wabash River. The southernmost part of the village drains to Johns Branch, a more southerly tributary of the Skillet Fork.

== Demographics ==
Historical population
Census	Pop.	Note	%±
1880	315		—
1890	362		14.9%
1900	421		16.3%
1910	364		−13.5%
1920	435		19.5%
1930	371		−14.7%
1940	470		26.7%
1950	450		−4.3%
1960	378		−16.0%
1970	343		−9.3%
1980	353		2.9%
1990	388		9.9%
2000	598		54.1%
2010	489		−18.2%
2020	512		4.7%
U.S. Decennial Census

As of the census of 2010, there were 489 people, 185 households, and 127 families residing in the village. The population density was 619.0 inhabitants per square mile (239.0/km^{2}). There were 217 housing units at an average density of 223.7 per square mile (86.4/km^{2}). The racial makeup of the village was 98.6% White, 1.4% African American, 0.2% Asian, and 0.2% from two or more races. Hispanic or Latino of any race were 0.8% of the population.

There were 185 households, out of which 35.7% had children under the age of 18 living with them, 50.8% were married couples living together, 10.3% had a female householder with no husband present, and 31.4% were non-families. 25.4% of all households were made up of individuals, and 7.8% had someone living alone who was 65 years of age or older. The average household size was 2.64 and the average family size was 3.08.

In the village, the population was spread out, with 33.4% under the age of 19, 5.7% from 20 to 24, 25.9% from 25 to 44, 22.0% from 45 to 64, and 12.9% who were 65 years of age or older. The median age was 33.1 years. For every 100 females, there were 93.3 males. For every 100 females age 18 and over, there were 97.2 males.

== Points of interest ==
There is a limestone outcropping due southeast of Iuka that is one of the purported locations of Burrows Cave. In 1982, Russell E. Burrow claimed to have found numerous archeological artifacts in this cave inscribed in Ancient Egyptian and Greek. Today, Burrows Cave is considered a hoax by most mainstream archeologists.

Along U.S. Route 50, 0.8 miles (1.3 km) east of the village limits, lies the Halfway Tavern, a replica structure of the original that lies halfway between Vincennes and St. Louis. The building is now a State Historic Site. It is claimed that Abraham Lincoln stayed at the inn, though there is no proof of his presence at the tavern. It is also believed that a group of Native Americans robbed gold from a passing stagecoach in the early 1800s, and that the gold is buried in a wooded area to the north of the tavern, but cited evidence questions the legitimacy of this claim.

Further east along U.S. Route 50 lies the Hebron School, a wooden one-room schoolhouse that operated between 1908 and 1952.
