= Haines Township =

Haines Township may refer to the following townships in the United States:

- Haines Township, Centre County, Pennsylvania
- Haines Township, Marion County, Illinois
