= Lamard =

Lamard may refer to:

- LaMard Township, Wayne County, Illinois
- Lamerd, a city in Iran
