= Rinard =

Rinard may refer to:

- Rinard, Illinois
- Rinard, Iowa
- Rinard Mills, Ohio
