= Bluford, Illinois =

- Village
- Location of Bluford in Jefferson County, Illinois
- Coordinates: 38°19′27″N 88°44′36″W
- Country: United States
- State: Illinois
- County: Jefferson
- Township: Webber

Area
  - Total: 1.56 sq mi (4.04 km^{2})
  - Land: 1.56 sq mi (4.04 km^{2})
  - Water: 0 sq mi (0.00 km^{2})
- Elevation: 525 ft (160 m)

Population (2020)
  - Total: 630
  - Density: 404/sq mi (155.8/km^{2})
- Time zone: UTC-6 (CST)
  - Summer (DST): UTC-5 (CDT)
- Zip code: 62814
- Area code: 618
- FIPS code: 17-06964
- GNIS ID: 2398145

Bluford is a village in Jefferson County, Illinois, in the United States. As of the 2020 census the village population was 630. It is part of the Mount Vernon Micropolitan Statistical Area.

== History ==
The town of Bluford was named after Bluford "Bluf" Green (1868–1912) when he was a small boy by his father Wiley Green (1835–1878), who was the local justice of the peace. An extended story about Bluford by Mrs. Opal H. Wood states:

In 1881, before there was a Bluford, construction was started on the Air Line Railroad, later the Southern Railroad. George Evans, Mt. Vernon banker, laid out the town on 40 acres of land bisected by the railroad. In 1882, Rev. Z. H. Byard, a United Brethren preacher, built the first store building and dwelling. Byard also was the first postmaster in Bluford, and the first railroad station agent. Bluford was incorporated by popular vote counted and verified on September 8, 1926<page 166 Filed Sept 8, 1926, Jefferson County.>. Dwight Bressler was its first mayor.

Bluford spread on both sides of the railroad. The south section unofficially was called Tilford, and the north, Bluford, both being names of the sons of Minerva (Flint) and Wiley Green. When son Tilford died, all the town became Bluford. No reason was given why the boys should have been so honored.

== Geography ==
Bluford is in eastern Jefferson County, 1 mile (1.6 km) south of Illinois Route 15 and 9 miles (14 km) east of Mount Vernon, the county seat. According to the 2021 census gazetteer files, Bluford has a total area of 1.56 square miles (4.04 km^{2}), all land.

== Demographics ==
Historical population
Census	Pop.	Note	%±
1930	517		—
1940	463		−10.4%
1950	477		3.0%
1960	388		−18.7%
1970	465		19.8%
1980	728		56.6%
1990	747		2.6%
2000	785		5.1%
2010	688		−12.4%
2020	630		−8.4%
U.S. Decennial Census

As of the 2020 census there were 630 people, 239 households, and 190 families residing in the village. The population density was 403.59 inhabitants per square mile (155.83/km^{2}). There were 268 housing units at an average density of 171.68 per square mile (66.29/km^{2}). The racial makeup of the village was 96.19% White, 0.16% African American, 0.16% Native American, 0.48% Asian, 0.00% Pacific Islander, 0.00% from other races, and 3.02% from two or more races. Hispanic or Latino of any race were 0.63% of the population.

There were 239 households, out of which 40.6% had children under the age of 18 living with them, 56.07% were married couples living together, 18.41% had a female householder with no husband present, and 20.50% were non-families. 18.83% of all households were made up of individuals, and 7.95% had someone living alone who was 65 years of age or older. The average household size was 3.16 and the average family size was 2.77.

The village's age distribution consisted of 25.7% under the age of 18, 8.9% from 18 to 24, 34.1% from 25 to 44, 16% from 45 to 64, and 15.3% who were 65 years of age or older. The median age was 34.5 years. For every 100 females, there were 97.6 males. For every 100 females age 18 and over, there were 89.2 males.

The median income for a household in the village was $49,911, and the median income for a family was $55,000. Males had a median income of $38,542 versus $23,750 for females. The per capita income for the village was $21,333. About 11.6% of families and 14.2% of the population were below the poverty line, including 17.6% of those under age 18 and 3.0% of those age 65 or over.

As of 2025, Webber High School, in Bluford, was ranked 390th of high schools in the state of Illinois.
