= Keith Township, Wayne County, Illinois =

Keith Township
- Township

- Location of Illinois in the United States
- Coordinates: 38°34′58″N 88°28′45″W
- Country: United States
- State: Illinois
- County: Wayne
- Organized: June, 1906

Area
  - Total: 36.02 sq mi (93.3 km^{2})
  - Land: 36 sq mi (93 km^{2})
  - Water: 0.02 sq mi (0.052 km^{2})
- Elevation: 456 ft (139 m)

Population (2010)
  - Estimate (2016): 386
- Time zone: UTC-6 (CST)
  - Summer (DST): UTC-5 (CDT)
- ZIP code: XXXXX
- Area code: 618
- FIPS code: 17-191-39285

Keith Township is located in Wayne County, Illinois. As of the 2010 census, its population was 392 and it contained 187 housing units.

== Geography ==
According to the 2010 census, the township has a total area of 36.02 square miles (93.3 km^{2}), of which 36 square miles (93 km^{2}) (or 99.94%) is land and 0.02 square miles (0.052 km^{2}) (or 0.06%) is water.

== Demographics ==
Historical population
Census	Pop.	Note	%±
2016 (est.)	386
U.S. Decennial Census
