= Odin Township, Marion County, Illinois =

Odin Township
- Township

- Location of Illinois in the United States
- Coordinates: 38°36′N 89°4′W
- Country: United States
- State: Illinois
- County: Marion
- Settled: 1827

Area
  - Total: 18.08 sq mi (46.8 km^{2})
  - Land: 18.05 sq mi (46.7 km^{2})
  - Water: 0.02 sq mi (0.052 km^{2})
- Elevation: 518 ft (158 m)

Population (2010)
  - Estimate (2016): 1,654
  - Density: 95.4/sq mi (36.8/km^{2})
- Time zone: UTC-6 (CST)
  - Summer (DST): UTC-5 (CDT)
- FIPS code: 17-121-55223

Odin Township is located in Marion County, Illinois, United States. As of the 2010 census, its population was 1,722 and it contained 735 housing units.

The first Euro-American settler came to Odin Township in 1827.

== Geography ==
Odin Township (E½ T2N R1E) is centered at 38°36'N 89°4'W (38.364, -89.059). It is transversed east–west by U.S. Route 50. The city of Odin is located in the eastern part of the township. Prior to 1896 Odin Township included what is now Sandoval Township.

According to the 2010 census, the township has a total area of 18.08 square miles (46.8 km^{2}), of which 18.05 square miles (46.7 km^{2}) (or 99.83%) is land and 0.02 square miles (0.052 km^{2}) (or 0.11%) is water.

== Demographics ==
Historical population
Census	Pop.	Note	%±
2016 (est.)	1,654
U.S. Decennial Census

== Adjacent townships ==
- Carrigan Township (north and northwest)
- Tonti Township (northeast)
- Salem Township (east)
- Raccoon Township (southeast)
- Centralia Township (south and southwest)
- Sandoval Township (west)
