= Leech Township, Wayne County, Illinois =

Leech Township
- Township
- Location of Illinois in the United States
- Coordinates: 38°19′23″N 88°12′24″W
- Country: United States
- State: Illinois
- County: Wayne
- Organized: November 8, 1859

Area
  - Total: 53.69 sq mi (139.1 km^{2})
  - Land: 53.38 sq mi (138.3 km^{2})
  - Water: 0.31 sq mi (0.80 km^{2})
- Elevation: 390 ft (120 m)

Population (2010)
  - Estimate (2016): 452
- Time zone: UTC-6 (CST)
  - Summer (DST): UTC-5 (CDT)
- ZIP code: XXXXX
- Area code: 618
- FIPS code: 17-191-42626

Leech Township is located in Wayne County, Illinois. As of the 2010 census, its population was 465 and it contained 237 housing units.

== Geography ==
According to the 2010 census, the township has a total area of 53.69 square miles (139.1 km^{2}), of which 53.38 square miles (138.3 km^{2}) (or 99.42%) is land and 0.31 square miles (0.80 km^{2}) (or 0.58%) is water.

== Demographics ==
Historical population
Census	Pop.	Note	%±
2016 (est.)	452
U.S. Decennial Census
