= Arrington Township, Wayne County, Illinois =

Arrington Township
- Township

- Location of Illinois in the United States
- Coordinates: 38°21′45″N 88°31′43″W
- Country: United States
- State: Illinois
- County: Wayne
- Organized: November 8, 1859

Area
  - Total: 16.99 sq mi (44.0 km^{2})
  - Land: 16.99 sq mi (44.0 km^{2})
  - Water: 0 sq mi (0 km^{2})
- Elevation: 413 ft (126 m)

Population (2010)
  - Estimate (2016): 406
- Time zone: UTC-6 (CST)
  - Summer (DST): UTC-5 (CDT)
- ZIP code: XXXXX
- Area code: 618
- FIPS code: 17-191-02297

Arrington Township is located in Wayne County, Illinois, United States. As of the 2010 census, its population was 409 and it contained 193 housing units.

== Geography ==
According to the 2010 census, the township has a total area of 16.99 square miles (44.0 km^{2}), all land.

== Demographics ==
Historical population
Census	Pop.	Note	%±
2016 (est.)	406
U.S. Decennial Census
