= Massilon Township, Wayne County, Illinois =

Massilon Township
- Township

- Location of Illinois in the United States
- Coordinates: 38°25′52″N 88°12′45″W
- Country: United States
- State: Illinois
- County: Wayne
- Organized: November 8, 1859

Area
  - Total: 33.48 sq mi (86.7 km^{2})
  - Land: 33.44 sq mi (86.6 km^{2})
  - Water: 0.05 sq mi (0.13 km^{2})
- Elevation: 394 ft (120 m)

Population (2010)
  - Estimate (2016): 170
- Time zone: UTC-6 (CST)
  - Summer (DST): UTC-5 (CDT)
- ZIP code: XXXXX
- Area code: 618
- FIPS code: 17-191-47501

Massilon Township is located in Wayne County, Illinois. As of the 2010 census, its population was 172 and it contained 83 housing units.

== Geography ==
According to the 2010 census, the township has a total area of 33.48 square miles (86.7 km^{2}), of which 33.44 square miles (86.6 km^{2}) (or 99.88%) is land and 0.05 square miles (0.13 km^{2}) (or 0.15%) is water.

== Demographics ==
Historical population
| Census | Pop. | Note | %± |
|---|---|---|---|
| 2016 (est.) | 170 |
U.S. Decennial Census
