= Mount Vernon Township, Jefferson County, Illinois =

Mount Vernon Township
- Township
- Location in Jefferson County

- Jefferson County's location in Illinois
- Coordinates: 38°21′N 88°52′W
- Country: United States
- State: Illinois
- County: Jefferson

Area
  - Total: 37.30 sq mi (96.6 km^{2})
  - Land: 37.04 sq mi (95.9 km^{2})
  - Water: 0.26 sq mi (0.67 km^{2}) 0.71%
- Elevation: 528 ft (161 m)

Population (2020)
  - Total: 12,576
  - Density: 339.5/sq mi (131.1/km^{2})
- Time zone: UTC-6 (CST)
  - Summer (DST): UTC-5 (CDT)
- ZIP codes: 62864, 62872
- FIPS code: 17-081-51193
- Website: mountvernontownshipil.org

Mount Vernon Township is one of sixteen townships in Jefferson County, Illinois, United States. As of the 2020 census, its population was 12,576 and it contained 5,997 housing units.

== Geography ==
According to the 2021 census gazetteer files, Mount Vernon Township has a total area of 37.30 square miles (96.61 km^{2}), of which 37.04 square miles (95.93 km^{2}) (or 99.29%) is land and 0.26 square miles (0.67 km^{2}) (or 0.71%) is water. The township is centered at 38°21′N 88°52′W (38.349,-88.859). It is traversed north–south by State Route 37, east–west by State Route 15, and diagonally across its southwest corner by State Route 142.

=== Cities, towns, villages ===
- Mount Vernon

=== Unincorporated towns ===
- Camp Ground at 38.339°N 88.836°W
- Idlewood at 38.380°N 88.9223°W
- Summersville at 38.328°N 88.867°W

(This list is based on USGS data and may include former settlements.)

=== Adjacent townships ===
- Field Township (north)
- Farrington Township (northeast)
- Webber Township (east)
- Pendleton Township (southeast)
- Dodds Township (south)
- Shiloh Township (west)
- Rome Township (northwest)

=== Cemeteries ===
The township contains these nine cemeteries: Atkinson, East Salem, Etheridge Farm, Hopewell, Oakwood, Old Union, Saint Mary's, Sursa and Williams.

=== Major highways ===
- Illinois Route 15
- Illinois Route 37
- Illinois Route 142

=== Airports and landing strips ===
- Good Samaritan Regional Health Care Center Heliport
- Mount Vernon/Outland Airport

== Demographics ==
As of the 2020 census there were 12,576 people, 5,296 households, and 3,452 families residing in the township. The population density was 337.13 inhabitants per square mile (130.17/km^{2}). There were 5,997 housing units at an average density of 160.76 per square mile (62.07/km^{2}). The racial makeup of the township was 75.83% White, 14.29% African American, 0.34% Native American, 0.81% Asian, 0.03% Pacific Islander, 1.18% from other races, and 7.52% from two or more races. Hispanic or Latino of any race were 3.42% of the population.

There were 5,296 households, out of which 27.50% had children under the age of 18 living with them, 42.07% were married couples living together, 15.45% had a female householder with no spouse present, and 34.82% were non-families. 30.40% of all households were made up of individuals, and 12.60% had someone living alone who was 65 years of age or older. The average household size was 2.38 and the average family size was 2.88.

The township's age distribution consisted of 21.9% under the age of 18, 8.5% from 18 to 24, 24.3% from 25 to 44, 24.8% from 45 to 64, and 20.5% who were 65 years of age or older. The median age was 41.1 years. For every 100 females, there were 94.6 males. For every 100 females age 18 and over, there were 95.9 males.

The median income for a household in the township was $47,516, and the median income for a family was $62,645. Males had a median income of $37,824 versus $25,845 for females. The per capita income for the township was $26,835. About 14.7% of families and 18.2% of the population were below the poverty line, including 37.0% of those under age 18 and 5.7% of those age 65 or over.

Historical population
| Census | Pop. | Note | %± |
|---|---|---|---|
| 2000 | 14,455 | | — |
| 2010 | 13,374 | | −7.5% |
| 2020 | 12,576 | | −6.0% |
U.S. Decennial Census

== Political districts ==
- Illinois's 19th congressional district
- State House District 107
- State Senate District 54
