= Grover Township, Wayne County, Illinois =

Grover Township
- Township

- Location of Illinois in the United States
- Coordinates: 38°21′48″N 88°18′27″W
- Country: United States
- State: Illinois
- County: Wayne
- Organized: December 14, 1888

Area
  - Total: 19.67 sq mi (50.9 km^{2})
  - Land: 19.65 sq mi (50.9 km^{2})
  - Water: 0.02 sq mi (0.052 km^{2})
- Elevation: 420 ft (130 m)

Population (2010)
  - Estimate (2016): 3,663
- Time zone: UTC-6 (CST)
  - Summer (DST): UTC-5 (CDT)
- ZIP code: XXXXX
- Area code: 618
- FIPS code: 17-191-31953

Grover Township is located in Wayne County, Illinois. As of the 2010 census, its population was 3,757 and it contained 1,941 housing units.

== Geography ==
According to the 2010 census, the township has a total area of 19.67 square miles (50.9 km^{2}), of which 19.65 square miles (50.9 km^{2}) (or 99.90%) is land and 0.02 square miles (0.052 km^{2}) (or 0.10%) is water.

== Demographics ==
Historical population
Census	Pop.	Note	%±
2016 (est.)	3,663
U.S. Decennial Census
