= Crooked Creek (Illinois) =

Physical characteristics
- Source
  - location: Marion County east of Alma, Illinois
- Mouth
  - location: Confluence with the Kaskaskia northwest of New Minden, Illinois

Basin features
- Progression: Crooked Creek → Kaskaskia → Mississippi → Gulf of Mexico

Crooked Creek is a tributary of the Kaskaskia River in the U.S. state of Illinois. After rising in Marion County, it flows into Clinton County, and then forms part of the border between Clinton County and Washington County. After this border service, the creek discharges into the Kaskaskia River. The creek drains the city of Centralia, and take the discharges from two reservoirs that serve Centralia, Lake Centralia and Raccoon Lake.
