= Elm River Township, Wayne County, Illinois =

Elm River Township
- Township
- Location of Illinois in the United States
- Coordinates: 38°30′30″N 88°18′43″W
- Country: United States
- State: Illinois
- County: Wayne
- Organized: November 8, 1859

Area
  - Total: 36.09 sq mi (93.5 km^{2})
  - Land: 36.02 sq mi (93.3 km^{2})
  - Water: 0.07 sq mi (0.18 km^{2})
- Elevation: 400 ft (120 m)

Population (2010)
  - Estimate (2016): 274
- Time zone: UTC-6 (CST)
  - Summer (DST): UTC-5 (CDT)
- ZIP code: XXXXX
- Area code: 618
- FIPS code: 17-191-23685

Elm River Township is located in Wayne County, Illinois. As of the 2010 census, its population was 276 and it contained 144 housing units.

== Geography ==
According to the 2010 census, the township has a total area of 36.09 square miles (93.5 km^{2}), of which 36.02 square miles (93.3 km^{2}) (or 99.81%) is land and 0.07 square miles (0.18 km^{2}) (or 0.19%) is water.

== Demographics ==
Historical population
Census	Pop.	Note	%±
2016 (est.)	274
U.S. Decennial Census
