= Zif Township, Wayne County, Illinois =

Zif Township
- Township

- Location of Illinois in the United States
- Coordinates: 38°35′12″N 88°18′59″W
- Country: United States
- State: Illinois
- County: Wayne
- Organized: November 8, 1859

Area
  - Total: 17.47 sq mi (45.2 km^{2})
  - Land: 17.47 sq mi (45.2 km^{2})
  - Water: 0 sq mi (0 km^{2})
- Elevation: 453 ft (138 m)

Population (2010)
  - Estimate (2016): 98
- Time zone: UTC-6 (CST)
  - Summer (DST): UTC-5 (CDT)
- ZIP code: XXXXX
- Area code: 618
- FIPS code: 17-191-84194

Zif Township is located in Wayne County, Illinois. As of the 2010 census, its population was 99 and it contained 51 housing units.

== Geography ==
According to the 2010 census, the township has a total area of 17.47 square miles (45.2 km^{2}), all land.

== Demographics ==
Historical population
Census	Pop.	Note	%±
2016 (est.)	98
U.S. Decennial Census

Historical population
Census	Pop.	Note	%±
1950 (est.)	246
U.S. Census
