= Jasper Township, Wayne County, Illinois =

Jasper Township
- Township
- Location within Illinois
- Coordinates: 38°25′47″N 88°18′47″W
- Country: United States
- State: Illinois
- County: Wayne
- Organized: November 8, 1859

Area
  - Total: 33.26 sq mi (86.1 km^{2})
  - Land: 33.17 sq mi (85.9 km^{2})
  - Water: 0.09 sq mi (0.23 km^{2})
- Elevation: 430 ft (130 m)

Population (2010)
  - Estimate (2016): 1,730
- Time zone: UTC-6 (CST)
  - Summer (DST): UTC-5 (CDT)
- ZIP code: XXXXX
- Area code: 618
- FIPS code: 17-191-38258

Jasper Township is located in Wayne County, Illinois. As of the 2010 census, its population was 1,769 and it contained 790 housing units.

== Geography ==
According to the 2010 census, the township has a total area of 33.26 square miles (86.1 km^{2}), of which 33.17 square miles (85.9 km^{2}) (or 99.73%) is land and 0.09 square miles (0.23 km^{2}) (or 0.27%) is water.

Historical population
Census	Pop.	Note	%±
2016 (est.)	1,730
U.S. Decennial Census
