= Barnhill Township, Wayne County, Illinois =

Barnhill Township
- Township

- Location of Illinois in the United States
- Coordinates: 38°17′59″N 88°19′01″W
- Country: United States
- State: Illinois
- County: Wayne
- Organized: November 8, 1859

Area
  - Total: 33.88 sq mi (87.7 km^{2})
  - Land: 33.71 sq mi (87.3 km^{2})
  - Water: 0.17 sq mi (0.44 km^{2})
- Elevation: 499 ft (152 m)

Population (2010)
  - Estimate (2016): 581
- Time zone: UTC-6 (CST)
  - Summer (DST): UTC-5 (CDT)
- ZIP code: XXXXX
- Area code: 618
- FIPS code: 17-191-03753

Barnhill Township is located in Wayne County, Illinois. As of the 2010 census, its population was 597 and it contained 275 housing units.

== Geography ==
According to the 2010 census, the township has a total area of 33.88 square miles (87.7 km^{2}), of which 33.71 square miles (87.3 km^{2}) (or 99.50%) is land and 0.17 square miles (0.44 km^{2}) (or 0.50%) is water.

== Demographics ==
Historical population
Census	Pop.	Note	%±
2016 (est.)	581
U.S. Decennial Census
