= Raccoon Township, Marion County, Illinois =

Raccoon Township
- Township

- Location of Illinois in the United States
- Coordinates: 38°31′N 88°59′W
- Country: United States
- State: Illinois
- County: Marion
- Settled: November 4, 1873

Area
  - Total: 35.72 sq mi (92.5 km^{2})
  - Land: 35.25 sq mi (91.3 km^{2})
  - Water: 0.46 sq mi (1.2 km^{2})
- Elevation: 548 ft (167 m)

Population (2010)
  - Estimate (2016): 1,498
  - Density: 43.7/sq mi (16.9/km^{2})
- Time zone: UTC-6 (CST)
  - Summer (DST): UTC-5 (CDT)
- FIPS code: 17-121-62445

Raccoon Township is located in Marion County, Illinois. As of the 2010 census, its population was 1,541 and it contained 744 housing units.

== Geography ==
Raccoon Township (T1N R2E) is centered at 38°31'N 88°59'W (38.518, -88.975).. The township is transversed north–south by Interstate Route 57 and State Route 37 and east as far as State Route 37 by State Route 161. According to the 2010 census, the township has a total area of 35.72 square miles (92.5 km^{2}), of which 35.25 square miles (91.3 km^{2}) (or 98.68%) is land and 0.46 square miles (1.2 km^{2}) (or 1.29%) is water. Most of Lake Centralia is located in the township.

== Demographics ==
Historical population
Census	Pop.	Note	%±
2016 (est.)	1,498
U.S. Decennial Census

== Adjacent townships ==
- Salem Township (north)
- Stevenson Township (northeast)
- Haines Township (east)
- Field Township, Jefferson County (southeast)
- Rome Township, Jefferson County (south)
- Grand Prairie Township, Jefferson County (southwest)
- Centralia Township (west)
- Odin Township, Marion County (northwest)
