= Orel Township, Wayne County, Illinois =

Orel Township
- Township
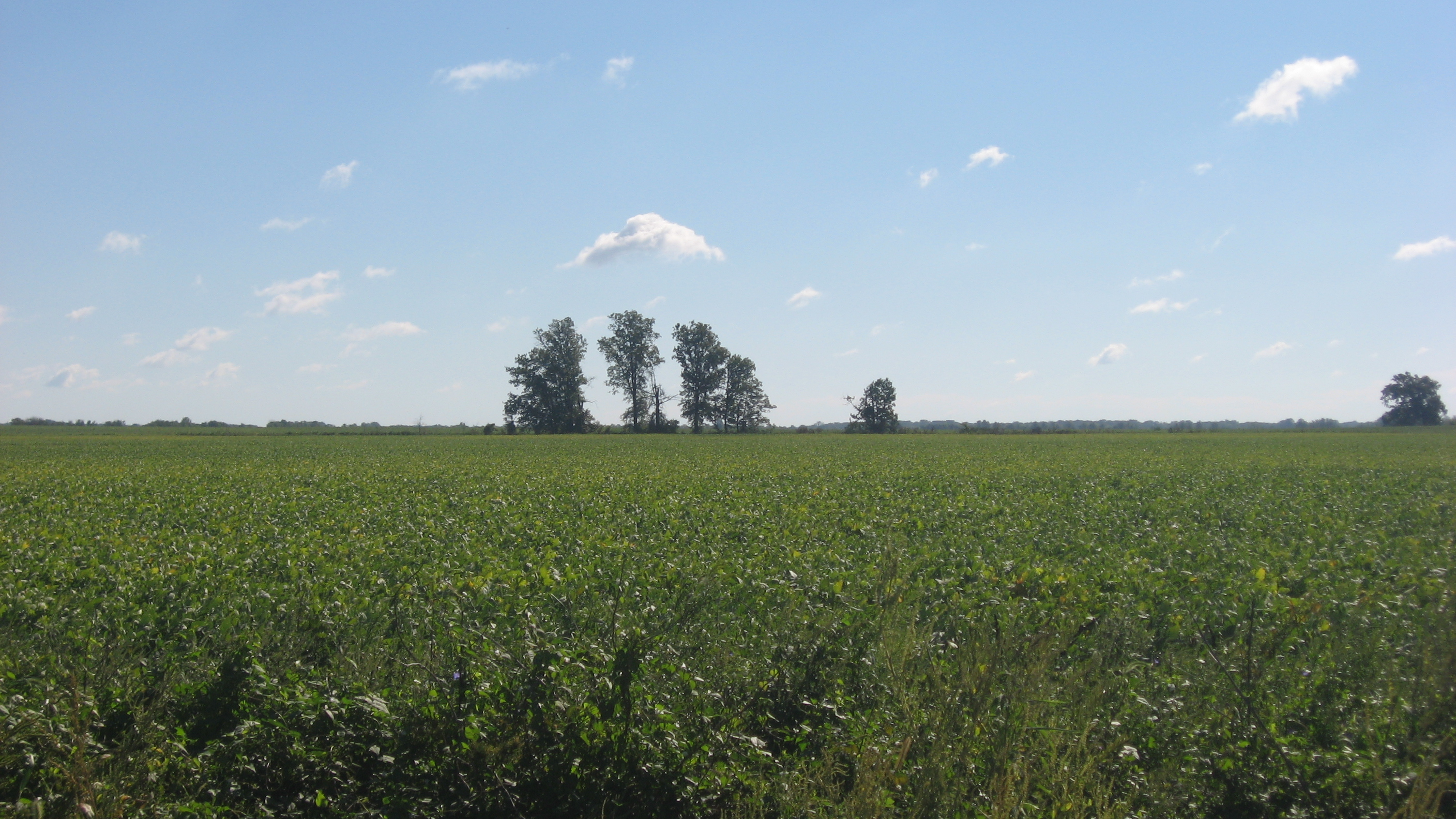
- Countryside around the Mayberry Village Site

- Location of Illinois in the United States
- Coordinates: 38°18′23″N 88°33′10″W
- Country: United States
- State: Illinois
- County: Wayne
- Organized: March, 1886

Area
  - Total: 47.2 sq mi (122 km^{2})
  - Land: 47.19 sq mi (122.2 km^{2})
  - Water: 0.01 sq mi (0.026 km^{2})
- Elevation: 394 ft (120 m)

Population (2010)
  - Estimate (2016): 1,398
- Time zone: UTC-6 (CST)
  - Summer (DST): UTC-5 (CDT)
- ZIP code: XXXXX
- Area code: 618
- FIPS code: 17-191-56510

Orel Township is located in Wayne County, Illinois. As of the 2010 census, its population was 1,420 and it contained 678 housing units.

== Geography ==
According to the 2010 census, the township has a total area of 47.2 square miles (122 km^{2}), of which 47.19 square miles (122.2 km^{2}) (or 99.98%) is land and 0.01 square miles (0.026 km^{2}) (or 0.02%) is water.

== Demographics ==
Historical population
Census	Pop.	Note	%±
2016 (est.)	1,398
U.S. Decennial Census
