= Golden Gate, Illinois =

Golden Gate
- Village
- Location of Golden Gate in Wayne County, Illinois.
- Coordinates: 38°21′32″N 88°12′17″W
- Country: United States
- State: Illinois
- County: Wayne

Area
  - Total: 0.081 sq mi (0.21 km^{2})
  - Land: 0.081 sq mi (0.21 km^{2})
  - Water: 0 sq mi (0.00 km^{2})
- Elevation: 404 ft (123 m)

Population (2020)
  - Total: 65
  - Density: 819.6/sq mi (316.45/km^{2})
- Time zone: UTC-6 (CST)
  - Summer (DST): UTC-5 (CDT)
- ZIP code: 62843
- Area code: 618
- FIPS code: 17-30250
- GNIS feature ID: 2398173

Golden Gate is a village in Wayne County, Illinois, along the Little Wabash River. The population was 65 at the 2020 census.

== Geography ==
According to the 2010 census, Golden Gate has a total area of 0.08 square miles (0.21 km^{2}), all land. The town was built by the Leach family in the late 19th century. The township that surrounds the Golden Gate area is known as Leech township named after Samuel Leech, an early settler of the area. Golden Gate was built along the railroad tracks and the Little Wabash river for business needs.

== Demographics ==
Historical population
Census	Pop.	Note	%±
1900	345		—
1910	311		−9.9%
1920	265		−14.8%
1930	223		−15.8%
1940	248		11.2%
1950	199		−19.8%
1960	156		−21.6%
1970	99		−36.5%
1980	126		27.3%
1990	71		−43.7%
2000	100		40.8%
2010	68		−32.0%
2020	65		−4.4%
U.S. Decennial Census

As of the census of 2000, there were 100 people, 39 households, and 28 families residing in the village. The population density was 1,306.6 inhabitants per square mile (504.5/km^{2}). There were 51 housing units at an average density of 666.4 per square mile (257.3/km^{2}). The racial makeup of the village was 100.00% White. Hispanic or Latino of any race were 4.00% of the population.

There were 39 households, out of which 43.6% had children under the age of 18 living with them, 64.1% were married couples living together, 7.7% had a female householder with no husband present, and 28.2% were non-families. 28.2% of all households were made up of individuals, and 10.3% had someone living alone who was 65 years of age or older. The average household size was 2.56 and the average family size was 3.11.

In the village, the population was spread out, with 30.0% under the age of 18, 6.0% from 18 to 24, 36.0% from 25 to 44, 18.0% from 45 to 64, and 10.0% who were 65 years of age or older. The median age was 34 years. For every 100 females, there were 108.3 males. For every 100 females age 18 and over, there were 94.4 males.

The median income for a household in the village was $21,250, and the median income for a family was $28,750. Males had a median income of $26,250 versus $23,500 for females. The per capita income for the village was $10,214. There were 12.5% of families and 19.2% of the population living below the poverty line, including 15.2% of under eighteens and 14.3% of those over 64.
