= Mount Erie Township, Wayne County, Illinois =

Mt. Erie Township
- Township

- Location of Illinois in the United States
- Coordinates: 38°32′13″N 88°12′18″W
- Country: United States
- State: Illinois
- County: Wayne
- Organized: November 8, 1859

Area
  - Total: 53.51 sq mi (138.6 km^{2})
  - Land: 53.37 sq mi (138.2 km^{2})
  - Water: 0.15 sq mi (0.39 km^{2})
- Elevation: 390 ft (120 m)

Population (2010)
  - Estimate (2016): 366
- Time zone: UTC-6 (CST)
  - Summer (DST): UTC-5 (CDT)
- ZIP code: XXXXX
- Area code: 618
- FIPS code: 17-191-50946

Mt. Erie Township is located in Wayne County, Illinois. As of the 2010 census, its population was 370 and it contained 177 housing units.

== Geography ==
According to the 2010 census, the township has a total area of 53.51 square miles (138.6 km^{2}), of which 53.37 square miles (138.2 km^{2}) (or 99.74%) is land and 0.15 square miles (0.39 km^{2}) (or 0.28%) is water.

== Demographics ==
Historical population
Census	Pop.	Note	%±
2016 (est.)	366
U.S. Decennial Census
