= Tonti Township, Marion County, Illinois =

Tonti Township
- Township

- Location of Illinois in the United States
- Coordinates: 38°41′N 88°58′W
- Country: United States
- State: Illinois
- County: Marion
- Settled: November 4, 1873

Area
  - Total: 35.55 sq mi (92.1 km^{2})
  - Land: 35.45 sq mi (91.8 km^{2})
  - Water: 0.1 sq mi (0.26 km^{2})
- Elevation: 591 ft (180 m)

Population (2010)
  - Estimate (2016): 980
  - Density: 28.6/sq mi (11.0/km^{2})
- Time zone: UTC-6 (CST)
  - Summer (DST): UTC-5 (CDT)
- FIPS code: 17-121-75744

Tonti Township is located in Marion County, Illinois. As of the 2010 census, its population was 1,013 and it contained 430 housing units.

== History ==
Tonti Township was named in honor of Henry de Tonti, an early Italian/French explorer of Illinois.

== Geography ==
Tonti Township (T3N R2E) is centered at 38°41'N 88°58'W (88.691,-88.975). It is transversed northeast–south by Interstate Route 57 and State Route 37. Part of the Salem Reservoir (El. 166 m) is located at the southeastern part of the township. According to the 2010 census, the township has a total area of 35.55 square miles (92.1 km^{2}), of which 35.45 square miles (91.8 km^{2}) (or 99.72%) is land and 0.1 square miles (0.26 km^{2}) (or 0.28%) is water.

== Demographics ==
Historical population
Census	Pop.	Note	%±
2016 (est.)	980
U.S. Decennial Census

== Adjacent townships ==
- Foster Township (north)
- Kinmundy Township (northeast)
- Omega Township (east)
- Stevenson Township (southeast)
- Salem Township (south)
- Odin Township (southwest)
- Carrigan Township (west)
- Patoka Township (northwest)
