= Keenes, Illinois =

Keenes
- Village
- Location of Keenes in Wayne County, Illinois.
- Country: United States
- State: Illinois
- County: Wayne

Area
  - Total: 0.13 sq mi (0.34 km^{2})
  - Land: 0.13 sq mi (0.34 km^{2})
  - Water: 0 sq mi (0.00 km^{2})
- Elevation: 449 ft (137 m)

Population (2020)
  - Total: 50
  - Density: 385.3/sq mi (148.78/km^{2})
- Time zone: UTC-6 (CST)
  - Summer (DST): UTC-5 (CDT)
- ZIP code: 62851
- Area code: 618
- FIPS code: 17-39233
- GNIS feature ID: 2398331

Keenes is a village in Wayne County, Illinois, United States. As of the 2020 census, Keenes had a population of 50.

== Geography ==
According to the 2010 census, Keenes has a total area of 0.13 square miles (0.34 km^{2}), all land.

== Demographics ==
Historical population
Census	Pop.	Note	%±
1960	114		—
1970	97		−14.9%
1980	123		26.8%
1990	62		−49.6%
2000	99		59.7%
2010	83		−16.2%
2020	50		−39.8%
U.S. Decennial Census

As of the census of 2000, there were 99 people, 39 households, and 31 families residing in the village. The population density was 762.2 inhabitants per square mile (294.3/km^{2}). There were 46 housing units at an average density of 354.2 per square mile (136.8/km^{2}). The racial makeup of the village was 100.00% White.

There were 39 households, out of which 38.5% had children under the age of 18 living with them, 59.0% were married couples living together, 7.7% had a female householder with no husband present, and 20.5% were non-families. 17.9% of all households were made up of individuals, and 10.3% had someone living alone who was 65 years of age or older. The average household size was 2.54 and the average family size was 2.81.

In the village, the population was spread out, with 26.3% under the age of 18, 16.2% from 18 to 24, 20.2% from 25 to 44, 27.3% from 45 to 64, and 10.1% who were 65 years of age or older. The median age was 30 years. For every 100 females, there were 90.4 males. For every 100 females age 18 and over, there were 87.2 males.

The median income for a household in the village was $16,875, and the median income for a family was $16,250. Males had a median income of $33,750 versus $13,500 for females. The per capita income for the village was $9,034. There were 35.3% of families and 40.4% of the population living below the poverty line, including 62.1% of under eighteens and 58.3% of those over 64.
