= Berry Township, Wayne County, Illinois =

Berry Township
- Township

- Location of Illinois in the United States
- Coordinates: 38°25′41″N 88°31′42″W
- Country: United States
- State: Illinois
- County: Wayne
- Organized: December 12, 1905

Area
  - Total: 37.49 sq mi (97.1 km^{2})
  - Land: 37.47 sq mi (97.0 km^{2})
  - Water: 0.03 sq mi (0.078 km^{2})
- Elevation: 417 ft (127 m)

Population (2010)
  - Estimate (2016): 346
- Time zone: UTC-6 (CST)
  - Summer (DST): UTC-5 (CDT)
- ZIP code: XXXXX
- Area code: 618
- FIPS code: 17-191-05521

Berry Township is located in Wayne County, Illinois. As of the 2010 census, its population was 351 and it contained 153 housing units.

== Geography ==
According to the 2010 census, the township has a total area of 37.49 square miles (97.1 km^{2}), of which 37.47 square miles (97.0 km^{2}) (or 99.95%) is land and 0.03 square miles (0.078 km^{2}) (or 0.08%) is water.

== Demographics ==
Historical population
Census	Pop.	Note	%±
2016 (est.)	346
U.S. Decennial Census
