= Camp Ground, Illinois =

- Unincorporated community
- Location within Illinois Location within the United States
- Coordinates: 38°20′20″N 88°50′06″W
- Country: United States
- State: Illinois
- County: Jefferson
- Elevation: 528 ft (161 m)
- Time zone: UTC-6 (Central (CST))
  - Summer (DST): UTC-5 (CDT)
- Area code: 618
- GNIS feature ID: 405469

Camp Ground is an unincorporated community in Mount Vernon Township, Jefferson County, Illinois, United States. Camp Ground is 4 miles (6.4 km) east-northeast of Mount Vernon.
