= Stevenson Township, Marion County, Illinois =

Stevenson Township
- Township

- Location of Illinois in the United States
- Coordinates: 38°36′N 88°52′W
- Country: United States
- State: Illinois
- County: Marion
- Settled: November 4, 1873

Area
  - Total: 36.71 sq mi (95.1 km^{2})
  - Land: 36.68 sq mi (95.0 km^{2})
  - Water: 0.04 sq mi (0.10 km^{2})
- Elevation: 535 ft (163 m)

Population (2010)
  - Estimate (2016): 1,261
  - Density: 35.5/sq mi (13.7/km^{2})
- Time zone: UTC-6 (CST)
  - Summer (DST): UTC-5 (CDT)
- FIPS code: 17-121-72598

Stevenson Township is located in Marion County, Illinois. As of the 2010 census, its population was 1,301 and it contained 516 housing units.

== Geography ==
Stevenson Township (T2N R3E) is centered at 38°36'N 88°52'W (38.602, -88.864). It is traversed east–west by U.S. Route 50. According to the 2010 census, the township has a total area of 36.71 square miles (95.1 km^{2}), of which 36.68 square miles (95.0 km^{2}) (or 99.92%) is land and 0.04 square miles (0.10 km^{2}) (or 0.11%) is water.

== Demographics ==
Historical population
Census	Pop.	Note	%±
2016 (est.)	1,261
U.S. Decennial Census

== Adjacent townships ==
- Alma Township (north)
- Omega Township (northeast)
- Iuka Township (east)
- Romine Township (southeast)
- Haines Township (south)
- Raccoon Township (southwest)
- Salem Township (west)
- Tonti Township (northwest)
