= Carrigan Township, Marion County, Illinois =

Carrigan Township
- Township

- Location of Illinois in the United States
- Coordinates: 38°41′N 89°5′W
- Country: United States
- State: Illinois
- County: Marion
- Settled: November 4, 1873

Area
  - Total: 35.14 sq mi (91.0 km^{2})
  - Land: 35.14 sq mi (91.0 km^{2})
  - Water: 0 sq mi (0 km^{2})
- Elevation: 531 ft (162 m)

Population (2010)
  - Estimate (2016): 372
  - Density: 10.8/sq mi (4.2/km^{2})
- Time zone: UTC-6 (CST)
  - Summer (DST): UTC-5 (CDT)
- FIPS code: 17-121-11436

Carrigan Township is located in Marion County, Illinois. As of the 2010 census, its population was 380 and it contained 178 housing units.

== Geography ==
Carrigan Township (T3N R1E) is centered at 38°41'N 89°5'W (89.689, -89.082). It is transversed north–south by U.S. Route 51 and east–west by the North Fork of the Kaskaskia River, on which the Carlyle Reservoir (El. 136 m) is located in the west part of the township. According to the 2010 census, the township has a total area of 35.14 square miles (91.0 km^{2}), all land.

== Demographics ==
Historical population
Census	Pop.	Note	%±
2016 (est.)	372
U.S. Decennial Census

== Adjacent townships ==
- Patoka Township (north)
- Foster Township (northeast)
- Tonti Township (east)
- Salem Township (southeast)
- Odin Township (south)
- Sandoval Township (south)
- Meridian Township, Clinton County (southwest)
- East Fork Township, Clinton County (west)
- Pope Township, Fayette County (northwest)
