= Indian Prairie Township, Wayne County, Illinois =

Indian Prairie Township
- Township
- Location within Illinois
- Coordinates: 38°31′08″N 88°31′34″W
- Country: United States
- State: Illinois
- County: Wayne
- Organized: November 8, 1859

Area
  - Total: 37.58 sq mi (97.3 km^{2})
  - Land: 37.34 sq mi (96.7 km^{2})
  - Water: 0.24 sq mi (0.62 km^{2})
- Elevation: 518 ft (158 m)

Population (2010)
  - Estimate (2016): 609
- Time zone: UTC-6 (CST)
  - Summer (DST): UTC-5 (CDT)
- ZIP code: XXXXX
- Area code: 618
- FIPS code: 17-191-37387

Indian Prairie Township is located in Wayne County, Illinois. As of the 2010 census, its population was 626 and it contained 268 housing units.

== Geography ==
According to the 2010 census, the township has a total area of 37.58 square miles (97.3 km^{2}), of which 37.34 square miles (96.7 km^{2}) (or 99.36%) is land and 0.24 square miles (0.62 km^{2}) (or 0.64%) is water.

Historical population
Census	Pop.	Note	%±
2016 (est.)	609
U.S. Decennial Census
