= Alma Township, Marion County, Illinois =

Alma Township
- Township

- Location of Illinois in the United States
- Coordinates: 38°41′N 88°52′W
- Country: United States
- State: Illinois
- County: Marion
- Settled: November 4, 1873

Area
  - Total: 36.85 sq mi (95.4 km^{2})
  - Land: 36.78 sq mi (95.3 km^{2})
  - Water: 0.07 sq mi (0.18 km^{2})
- Elevation: 564 ft (172 m)

Population (2010)
  - Estimate (2016): 818
  - Density: 22.7/sq mi (8.8/km^{2})
- Time zone: UTC-6 (CST)
  - Summer (DST): UTC-5 (CDT)
- FIPS code: 17-121-00932

Alma Township is located in Marion County, Illinois. As of the 2010 census, its population was 836 and it contained 374 housing units.

== Geography ==
Alma Township (T3N R3E) is centered at 38°41'N 88°52'W (38.689, -88.865). According to the 2010 census, the township has a total area of 36.85 square miles (95.4 km^{2}), of which 36.78 square miles (95.3 km^{2}) (or 99.81%) is land and 0.07 square miles (0.18 km^{2}) (or 0.19%) is water.

== Demographics ==
Historical population
Census	Pop.	Note	%±
2016 (est.)	818
U.S. Decennial Census

== Adjacent townships ==
- Kinmundy Township (north)
- Meacham Township (northeast)
- Omega Township (east)
- Iuka Township (southeast)
- Stevenson Township (south)
- Salem Township (southwest)
- Tonti Township (west)
- Foster Township (northwest)
