= Salem Township, Marion County, Illinois =

Salem Township
- Township

- Location of Illinois in the United States
- Coordinates: 38°36′N 88°59′W
- Country: United States
- State: Illinois
- County: Marion
- Settled: November 4, 1873

Area
  - Total: 35.72 sq mi (92.5 km^{2})
  - Land: 35.38 sq mi (91.6 km^{2})
  - Water: 0.34 sq mi (0.88 km^{2})
- Elevation: 512 ft (156 m)

Population (2010)
  - Estimate (2016): 8,993
  - Density: 262.5/sq mi (101.4/km^{2})
- Time zone: UTC-6 (CST)
  - Summer (DST): UTC-5 (CDT)
- FIPS code: 17-121-67249

Salem Township is located in Marion County, Illinois. As of the 2010 census, its population was 9,286 and it contained 4,225 housing units.

== Geography ==
Salem Township (T2N R2E) is centered at 38°36'N 88°59'W (38.619, -88.980). It is traversed north–south by Interstate Route 57 and State Route 37 and east–west by U.S. Route 50. The city of Salem is located in the northeastern part of the township as is most of the Salem Reservoir (El. 166 m). According to the 2010 census, the township has a total area of 35.72 square miles (92.5 km^{2}), of which 35.38 square miles (91.6 km^{2}) (or 99.05%) is land and 0.34 square miles (0.88 km^{2}) (or 0.95%) is water.

== Demographics ==
Historical population
Census	Pop.	Note	%±
2016 (est.)	8,993
U.S. Decennial Census

== Adjacent townships ==
- Tonti Township (north)
- Alma Township (northeast)
- Stevenson Township (east)
- Haines Township (southeast)
- Raccoon Township (south)
- Centralia Township (southwest)
- Odin Township (west)
- Carrigan Township, Marion County (northwest)
