= Brookside Township, Clinton County, Illinois =

Brookside Township
- Township
- Location in Clinton County

- Clinton County's location in Illinois
- Coordinates: 38°32′N 89°12′W
- Country: United States
- State: Illinois
- County: Clinton
- Established: November 4, 1873

Area
  - Total: 24.33 sq mi (63.0 km^{2})
  - Land: 24.33 sq mi (63.0 km^{2})
  - Water: 0 sq mi (0 km^{2}) 0%
- Elevation: 449 ft (137 m)

Population (2020)
  - Total: 4,444
  - Density: 182.7/sq mi (70.52/km^{2})
- Time zone: UTC-6 (CST)
  - Summer (DST): UTC-5 (CDT)
- ZIP codes: 62250, 62801
- FIPS code: 17-027-08732

Brookside Township is one of fifteen townships in Clinton County, Illinois, United States. As of the 2020 census, its population was 4,444 and it contained 1,570 housing units. The township's name changed from Crooked Creek Township on June 1, 1874.

== Geography ==
According to the 2010 census, the township has a total area of 24.33 square miles (63.0 km^{2}), all land.

=== Cities, towns, villages ===
- Centralia (west quarter)
- Wamac (northwest quarter)

=== Cemeteries ===
- Barker
- Chambers
- Garrison
- Gilmore
- Jolliff
- Jones
- Petrea

=== Major highways ===
- Illinois Route 161

=== Airports and landing strips ===
- Centralia Correctional Center Heliport

=== Landmarks ===
- Fairview Park
- Warren G Murray Developmental Center

== Demographics ==
As of the 2020 census there were 4,444 people, 1,694 households, and 935 families residing in the township. The population density was 182.78 inhabitants per square mile (70.57/km^{2}). There were 1,570 housing units at an average density of 64.57 per square mile (24.93/km^{2}). The racial makeup of the township was 70.81% White, 18.23% African American, 0.14% Native American, 0.74% Asian, 0.00% Pacific Islander, 5.29% from other races, and 4.79% from two or more races. Hispanic or Latino of any race were 7.00% of the population.

There were 1,694 households, out of which 25.30% had children under the age of 18 living with them, 36.07% were married couples living together, 11.57% had a female householder with no spouse present, and 44.81% were non-families. 37.20% of all households were made up of individuals, and 22.10% had someone living alone who was 65 years of age or older. The average household size was 2.15 and the average family size was 2.80.

The township's age distribution consisted of 14.2% under the age of 18, 8.5% from 18 to 24, 32.8% from 25 to 44, 29% from 45 to 64, and 15.6% who were 65 years of age or older. The median age was 40.5 years. For every 100 females, there were 190.8 males. For every 100 females age 18 and over, there were 213.8 males.

The median income for a household in the township was $40,484, and the median income for a family was $50,568. Males had a median income of $38,922 versus $26,250 for females. The per capita income for the township was $19,272. About 15.7% of families and 22.4% of the population were below the poverty line, including 39.9% of those under age 18 and 17.4% of those age 65 or over.

Historical population
Census	Pop.	Note	%±
2010	5,503		—
2020	4,444		−19.2%
US Decennial Census

== School districts ==
- Carlyle Community Unit School District 1

== Political districts ==
- Illinois's 19th congressional district
- State House District 107
- State Senate District 54
