= Barnhill, Illinois =

- Unincorporated community
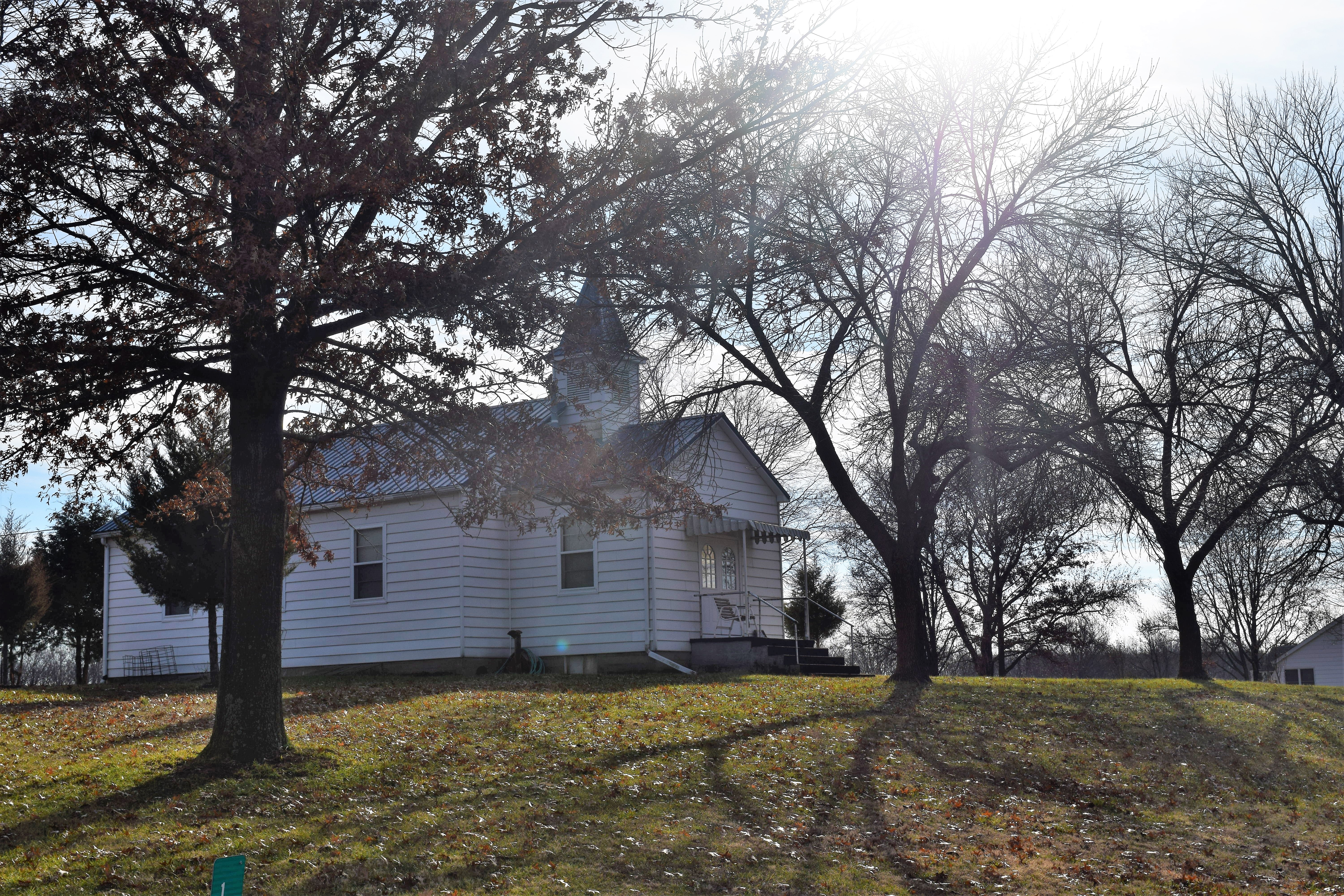
- Church in Barnhill

- Location within Illinois Location within the United States
- Coordinates: 38°17′04″N 88°21′51″W
- Country: United States
- State: Illinois
- County: Wayne
- Elevation: 397 ft (121 m)
- Time zone: UTC-6 (Central (CST))
  - Summer (DST): UTC-5 (CDT)
- ZIP code: 62809
- Area code: 618
- GNIS feature ID: 403921

Barnhill is an unincorporated community in Wayne County, Illinois, United States. Barnhill is west of U.S. Route 45 and north of Mill Shoals. Barnhill had a post office, which closed on March 5, 2005.
