= LaMard Township, Wayne County, Illinois =

LaMard Township
- Township

- Location of Illinois in the United States
- Coordinates: 38°25′30″N 88°25′17″W
- Country: United States
- State: Illinois
- County: Wayne
- Organized: November 8, 1859

Area
  - Total: 34.45 sq mi (89.2 km^{2})
  - Land: 34.43 sq mi (89.2 km^{2})
  - Water: 0.01 sq mi (0.026 km^{2})
- Elevation: 440 ft (130 m)

Population (2010)
  - Estimate (2016): 1,382
- Time zone: UTC-6 (CST)
  - Summer (DST): UTC-5 (CDT)
- ZIP code: XXXXX
- Area code: 618
- FIPS code: 17-191-41755

LaMard Township is located in Wayne County, Illinois. As of the 2010 census, its population was 1,422 and it contained 647 housing units.

== Geography ==
According to the 2010 census, the township has a total area of 34.45 square miles (89.2 km^{2}), of which 34.43 square miles (89.2 km^{2}) (or 99.94%) is land and 0.01 square miles (0.026 km^{2}) (or 0.03%) is water.

== Demographics ==
Historical population
Census	Pop.	Note	%±
2016 (est.)	1,382
U.S. Decennial Census
