= Big Mound Township, Wayne County, Illinois =

Big Mound Township
- Township

- Location of Illinois in the United States
- Coordinates: 38°19′12″N 88°25′39″W
- Country: United States
- State: Illinois
- County: Wayne
- Organized: November 8, 1859

Area
  - Total: 51.91 sq mi (134.4 km^{2})
  - Land: 51.69 sq mi (133.9 km^{2})
  - Water: 0.21 sq mi (0.54 km^{2})
- Elevation: 377 ft (115 m)

Population (2010)
  - Estimate (2016): 1,701
- Time zone: UTC-6 (CST)
  - Summer (DST): UTC-5 (CDT)
- ZIP code: 62837
- Area code: 618
- FIPS code: 17-191-05950

Big Mound Township is located in Wayne County, Illinois. As of the 2010 census, its population was 1,742 and it contained 882 housing units.

== Geography ==
According to the 2010 census, the township has a total area of 51.91 square miles (134.4 km^{2}), of which 51.69 square miles (133.9 km^{2}) (or 99.58%) is land and 0.21 square miles (0.54 km^{2}) (or 0.40%) is water.

== Demographics ==
Historical population
Census	Pop.	Note	%±
2016 (est.)	1,701
U.S. Decennial Census
