= Wayne County, Illinois =

County in Illinois, United States

- County
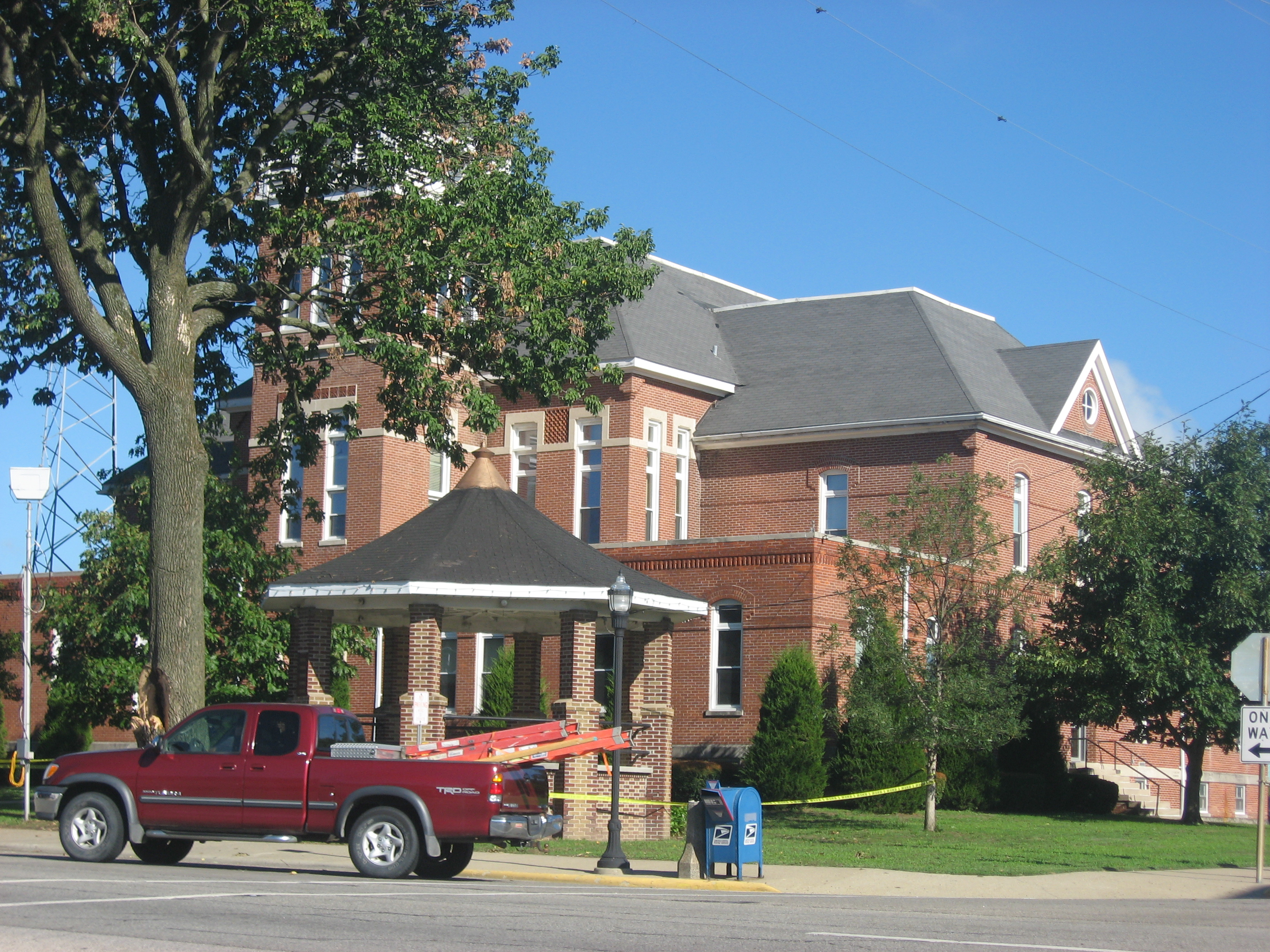
- Wayne County Courthouse in Fairfield

- Location within the U.S. state of Illinois
- Coordinates: 38°26′N 88°25′W
- Country: United States
- State: Illinois
- Founded: 1819
- Named for: Anthony Wayne
- Seat: Fairfield
- Largest city: Fairfield

Area
  - Total: 715 sq mi (1,850 km^{2})
  - Land: 714 sq mi (1,850 km^{2})
  - Water: 1.7 sq mi (4.4 km^{2}) 0.2%

Population (2020)
  - Total: 16,179
  - Estimate (2025): 15,882 ▼
  - Density: 22.3/sq mi (8.6/km^{2})
- Time zone: UTC−6 (Central)
  - Summer (DST): UTC−5 (CDT)
- Congressional district: 12th
- Website: waynecountyil.gov

Wayne County is a county located in the U.S. state of Illinois. According to the 2020 census, it had a population of 16,179. Its county seat is Fairfield. It is located in the southern portion of Illinois known locally as "Little Egypt".

== History ==
Wayne County was formed in 1819 out of Edwards County. It is named after Gen. "Mad Anthony" Wayne, an officer in the Revolutionary War and Northwest Indian War.

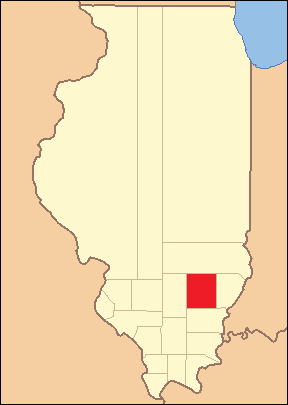
Wayne County between its 1819 creation and 1821

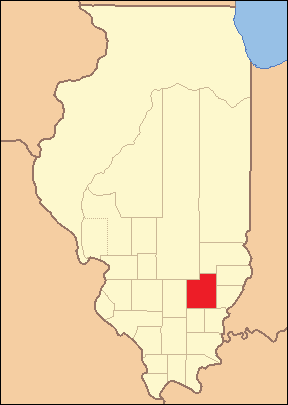
Wayne County between 1821 and 1824

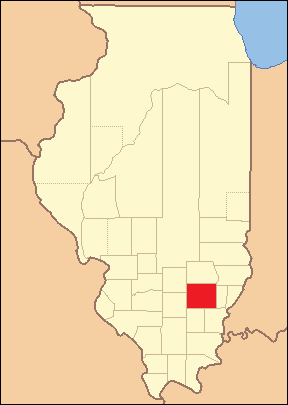
Wayne County in 1824, reduced to its current size

== Geography ==
According to the U.S. Census Bureau, the county has a total area of 715 square miles (1,850 km^{2}), of which 714 square miles (1,850 km^{2}) is land and 1.7 square miles (4.4 km^{2}) (0.2%) is water.

=== Climate and weather ===
Fairfield, Illinois

Climate chart (precipitation, max. and min. temperature)
J	F	M	A	M	J	J	A	S	O	N	D
2.8 37 20	2.7 43 24	4.6 54 33	4.8 66 43	4.7 76 52	4.2 85 61	3.8 88 65	3.4 87 63	2.9 80 55	3.3 68 44	4.3 53 34	3.5 42 24
- █ Average max. and min. temperatures in °F
- █ Precipitation totals in inches
- Source: The Weather Channel
Metric conversion
J	F	M	A	M	J	J	A	S	O	N	D
71 3 −7	69 6 −4	117 12 1	122 19 6	120 24 11	107 29 16	97 31 18	85 31 17	74 27 13	84 20 7	110 12 1	88 6 −4
- █ Average max. and min. temperatures in °C
- █ Precipitation totals in mm

In recent years, average temperatures in the county seat of Fairfield have ranged from a low of 20 °F (−7 °C) in January to a high of 88 °F (31 °C) in July, although a record low of −23 °F (−31 °C) was recorded in January 1994 and a record high of 113 °F (45 °C) was recorded in July 1901. Average monthly precipitation ranged from 2.70 inches (69 mm) in February to 4.80 inches (122 mm) in April.

=== Transit ===
- Rides Mass Transit District

=== Major highways ===
- Interstate 64
- U.S. Highway 45
- Illinois Route 15
- Illinois Route 242

=== Adjacent counties ===
- Clay County (north)
- Richland County (northeast)
- Edwards County (east)
- White County (southeast)
- Hamilton County (south)
- Jefferson County (southwest)
- Marion County (northwest)

== Demographics ==
Historical population
Census	Pop.	Note	%±
1820	1,114		—
1830	2,553		129.2%
1840	5,133		101.1%
1850	6,825		33.0%
1860	12,223		79.1%
1870	19,758		61.6%
1880	21,291		7.8%
1890	23,806		11.8%
1900	27,626		16.0%
1910	25,697		−7.0%
1920	22,772		−11.4%
1930	19,130		−16.0%
1940	22,092		15.5%
1950	20,933		−5.2%
1960	19,008		−9.2%
1970	17,004		−10.5%
1980	18,059		6.2%
1990	17,241		−4.5%
2000	17,151		−0.5%
2010	16,760		−2.3%
2020	16,179		−3.5%
2025 (est.)	15,882	▼	−1.8%
U.S. Decennial Census; 1790-1960 1900-1990; 1990-2000 2010 2020 2024

=== 2020 census ===
As of the 2020 census, the county had a population of 16,179. The median age was 42.8 years. 23.3% of residents were under the age of 18 and 21.9% of residents were 65 years of age or older. For every 100 females there were 97.3 males, and for every 100 females age 18 and over there were 96.4 males age 18 and over.

The racial makeup of the county was 95.5% White, 0.6% Black or African American, 0.2% American Indian and Alaska Native, 0.3% Asian, <0.1% Native Hawaiian and Pacific Islander, 0.6% from some other race, and 2.8% from two or more races. Hispanic or Latino residents of any race comprised 1.1% of the population.

29.5% of residents lived in urban areas, while 70.5% lived in rural areas.

There were 6,774 households in the county, of which 28.1% had children under the age of 18 living in them. Of all households, 51.4% were married-couple households, 18.3% were households with a male householder and no spouse or partner present, and 24.7% were households with a female householder and no spouse or partner present. About 30.0% of all households were made up of individuals and 16.2% had someone living alone who was 65 years of age or older.

There were 7,679 housing units, of which 11.8% were vacant. Among occupied housing units, 78.9% were owner-occupied and 21.1% were renter-occupied. The homeowner vacancy rate was 2.2% and the rental vacancy rate was 11.3%.

=== Racial and ethnic composition ===
Wayne County, Illinois – Racial and ethnic composition Note: the US Census treats Hispanic/Latino as an ethnic category. This table excludes Latinos from the racial categories and assigns them to a separate category. Hispanics/Latinos may be of any race.
Race / Ethnicity (NH = Non-Hispanic)	Pop 1980	Pop 1990	Pop 2000	Pop 2010	Pop 2020	% 1980	% 1990	% 2000	% 2010	% 2020
White alone (NH)	17,902	17,087	16,853	16,340	15,400	99.13%	99.11%	98.26%	97.49%	95.19%
Black or African American alone (NH)	6	8	19	40	90	0.03%	0.05%	0.11%	0.24%	0.56%
Native American or Alaska Native alone (NH)	26	29	29	26	26	0.14%	0.17%	0.17%	0.16%	0.16%
Asian alone (NH)	50	44	58	70	49	0.28%	0.26%	0.34%	0.42%	0.30%
Native Hawaiian or Pacific Islander alone (NH)	x	x	1	1	5	x	x	0.01%	0.01%	0.03%
Other race alone (NH)	14	1	4	2	29	0.08%	0.01%	0.02%	0.01%	0.18%
Mixed race or Multiracial (NH)	x	x	84	105	398	x	x	0.49%	0.63%	2.46%
Hispanic or Latino (any race)	61	72	103	176	182	0.34%	0.42%	0.60%	1.05%	1.12%
Total	18,059	17,241	17,151	16,760	16,179	100.00%	100.00%	100.00%	100.00%	100.00%

=== 2010 census ===
As of the 2010 United States census, there were 16,760 people, 7,102 households, and 4,853 families living in the county. The population density was 23.5 inhabitants per square mile (9.1/km^{2}). There were 7,975 housing units at an average density of 11.2 per square mile (4.3/km^{2}). The racial makeup of the county was 98.0% white, 0.4% Asian, 0.3% black or African American, 0.2% American Indian, 0.3% from other races, and 0.8% from two or more races. Those of Hispanic or Latino origin made up 1.1% of the population. In terms of ancestry, 17.0% were German, 14.1% were English, 12.7% were American, and 9.8% were Irish.

Of the 7,102 households, 28.7% had children under the age of 18 living with them, 55.1% were married couples living together, 9.1% had a female householder with no husband present, 31.7% were non-families, and 28.4% of all households were made up of individuals. The average household size was 2.35 and the average family size was 2.86. The median age was 42.9 years.

The median income for a household in the county was $39,207 and the median income for a family was $47,879. Males had a median income of $34,800 versus $27,192 for females. The per capita income for the county was $21,493. About 9.9% of families and 14.3% of the population were below the poverty line, including 18.0% of those under age 18 and 13.8% of those age 65 or over.

== Communities ==
=== City ===
- Fairfield

=== Villages ===
- Cisne
- Golden Gate
- Jeffersonville
- Johnsonville
- Keenes
- Mount Erie
- Sims
- Wayne City

=== Unincorporated communities ===
- Barnhill
- Ellery
- Mayberry
- Rinard
- Wynoose
- Zenith

=== Townships ===
Wayne County is divided into these 20 townships:

- Arrington
- Barnhill
- Bedford
- Berry
- Big Mound
- Elm River
- Four Mile
- Garden Hill
- Grover
- Hickory Hill
- Indian Prairie
- Jasper
- Keith
- Lamard
- Leech
- Massilon
- Mount Erie
- Orchard
- Orel
- Zif

== Program 1033 Acquisitions ==
According to Department of Defense data, Wayne County has received six 5.56MM rifles and three "Utility Trucks" with a total acquisition cost of $120,705.

== Politics ==
Wayne County is one of the most Republican counties in Illinois; Republicans have won the vast majority of presidential elections. Democrats have not won Wayne County since Lyndon Johnson's 1964 landslide, and even then by less than 5 percentage points.

In the nineteenth century, the county was exclusively Democratic instead. The shift began right at 1900 and solidified in 1920, after which it regularly gave majority votes to Republicans. Donald Trump has given record Republican victories of over 80% in each of his runs.

United States presidential election results for Wayne County, Illinois
Year	Republican		Democratic		Third party(ies)	
Year	No.	%	No.	%	No.	%
1892	2,350	43.75%	2,372	44.16%	649	12.08%
1896	2,906	47.80%	3,102	51.03%	71	1.17%
1900	3,117	48.97%	3,062	48.11%	186	2.92%
1904	3,078	52.63%	2,416	41.31%	354	6.05%
1908	2,946	49.60%	2,791	46.99%	203	3.42%
1912	1,418	25.20%	2,378	42.26%	1,831	32.54%
1916	5,383	50.99%	4,934	46.74%	239	2.26%
1920	4,908	60.50%	3,137	38.67%	68	0.84%
1924	4,937	52.70%	4,247	45.34%	184	1.96%
1928	5,189	62.04%	3,108	37.16%	67	0.80%
1932	4,097	42.43%	5,488	56.84%	71	0.74%
1936	5,528	48.79%	5,752	50.77%	50	0.44%
1940	6,556	53.77%	5,569	45.68%	67	0.55%
1944	5,683	58.21%	4,019	41.17%	61	0.62%
1948	4,984	54.69%	4,070	44.66%	60	0.66%
1952	6,495	62.34%	3,911	37.54%	12	0.12%
1956	6,286	61.37%	3,942	38.49%	14	0.14%
1960	6,652	62.67%	3,954	37.25%	9	0.08%
1964	4,745	47.72%	5,198	52.28%	0	0.00%
1968	5,532	59.59%	2,993	32.24%	759	8.18%
1972	6,400	69.75%	2,763	30.11%	12	0.13%
1976	5,211	54.39%	4,303	44.91%	67	0.70%
1980	6,013	62.92%	3,258	34.09%	286	2.99%
1984	6,298	70.36%	2,621	29.28%	32	0.36%
1988	5,481	63.29%	3,135	36.20%	44	0.51%
1992	3,809	42.93%	3,332	37.56%	1,731	19.51%
1996	4,029	49.50%	3,054	37.52%	1,057	12.99%
2000	5,347	69.50%	2,209	28.71%	137	1.78%
2004	6,102	73.63%	2,139	25.81%	46	0.56%
2008	5,390	66.78%	2,547	31.56%	134	1.66%
2012	5,988	77.80%	1,514	19.67%	195	2.53%
2016	6,967	83.93%	1,048	12.62%	286	3.45%
2020	7,176	84.43%	1,187	13.97%	136	1.60%
2024	7,019	84.66%	1,155	13.93%	117	1.41%

== See also ==
- National Register of Historic Places listings in Wayne County
