= Haines Township, Marion County, Illinois =

Haines Township
- Township

- Location of Illinois in the United States
- Coordinates: 38°31′N 88°52′W
- Country: United States
- State: Illinois
- County: Marion
- Settled: November 4, 1873

Area
  - Total: 36.1 sq mi (93 km^{2})
  - Land: 36.06 sq mi (93.4 km^{2})
  - Water: 0.03 sq mi (0.078 km^{2})
- Elevation: 541 ft (165 m)

Population (2010)
  - Estimate (2016): 969
  - Density: 27.8/sq mi (10.7/km^{2})
- Time zone: UTC-6 (CST)
  - Summer (DST): UTC-5 (CDT)
- FIPS code: 17-121-32187
- Website: hainesil.gov

Haines Township is located in Marion County, Illinois. As of the 2010 census, its population was 1,002 and it contained 422 housing units.

== Geography ==
Haines Township (T1N R3E) is centered at 38°31'N 88°52'W (38.519, -88.869). According to the 2010 census, the township has a total area of 36.1 square miles (93 km^{2}), of which 36.06 square miles (93.4 km^{2}) (or 99.89%) is land and 0.03 square miles (0.078 km^{2}) (or 0.08%) is water.

== Demographics ==
Historical population
Census	Pop.	Note	%±
2016 (est.)	969
U.S. Decennial Census

== Adjacent townships ==
- Stevenson Township (north)
- Iuka Township (northeast)
- Romine Township (east)
- Farrington Township, Jefferson County (southeast)
- Field Township, Jefferson County (south)
- Rome Township, Jefferson County (southwest)
- Raccoon Township (west)
- Salem Township (northwest)
