= Four Mile Township, Wayne County, Illinois =

Four Mile Township
- Township

- Location of Illinois in the United States
- Coordinates: 38°18′42″N 88°39′18″W
- Country: United States
- State: Illinois
- County: Wayne
- Organized: November 8, 1859

Area
  - Total: 40.06 sq mi (103.8 km^{2})
  - Land: 40.04 sq mi (103.7 km^{2})
  - Water: 0.02 sq mi (0.052 km^{2})
- Elevation: 430 ft (130 m)

Population (2010)
  - Estimate (2016): 647
- Time zone: UTC-6 (CST)
  - Summer (DST): UTC-5 (CDT)
- ZIP code: XXXXX
- Area code: 618
- FIPS code: 17-191-27364

Four Mile Township is located in Wayne County, Illinois. As of the 2010 census, its population was 666 and it contained 272 housing units.

== Geography ==
According to the 2010 census, the township has a total area of 40.06 square miles (103.8 km^{2}), of which 40.04 square miles (103.7 km^{2}) (or 99.95%) is land and 0.02 square miles (0.052 km^{2}) (or 0.05%) is water.

== Demographics ==
Historical population
Census	Pop.	Note	%±
2016 (est.)	647
U.S. Decennial Census
