= Centralia Township, Marion County, Illinois =

Centralia Township
- Township

- Location of Illinois in the United States
- Coordinates: 38°31′N 89°5′W
- Country: United States
- State: Illinois
- County: Marion
- Settled: November 4, 1873

Area
  - Total: 36.1 sq mi (93 km^{2})
  - Land: 35.02 sq mi (90.7 km^{2})
  - Water: 1.08 sq mi (2.8 km^{2})
- Elevation: 515 ft (157 m)

Population (2010)
  - Estimate (2016): 14,547
  - Density: 429.5/sq mi (165.8/km^{2})
- Time zone: UTC-6 (CST)
  - Summer (DST): UTC-5 (CDT)
- FIPS code: 17-121-12177

Centralia Township is located in Marion County, Illinois. As of the 2010 census, its population was 15,042 and it contained 7,360 housing units.

== Geography ==
Centralia township (T1N R1E) is centered at 38°31'N 89°5'W (38.517, -89.087). The city of Centralia is located in the western part of the township. The township is traversed by U.S. Route 51 (north-south) and by State Route 161 (east-west). According to the 2010 census, the township has a total area of 36.1 square miles (93 km^{2}), of which 35.02 square miles (90.7 km^{2}) (or 97.01%) is land and 1.08 square miles (2.8 km^{2}) (or 2.99%) is water.

== Demographics ==
Historical population
Census	Pop.	Note	%±
2016 (est.)	14,547
U.S. Decennial Census

== Adjacent townships ==
- Sandoval Township (north)
- Odin Township (north)
- Salem Township (northeast)
- Raccoon Township (east)
- Rome Township, Jefferson County (southeast)
- Grand Prairie Township, Jefferson County (south)
- Irvington Township, Washington County (southwest and west)
- Brookside Township, Clinton County (west)
- Meridian Township, Clinton County (northwest)
