= Field Township, Jefferson County, Illinois =

Field Township
- Township
- Location in Jefferson County

- Jefferson County's location in Illinois
- Coordinates: 38°26′N 88°52′W
- Country: United States
- State: Illinois
- County: Jefferson

Area
  - Total: 37.03 sq mi (95.9 km^{2})
  - Land: 36.84 sq mi (95.4 km^{2})
  - Water: 0.19 sq mi (0.49 km^{2}) 0.51%
- Elevation: 581 ft (177 m)

Population (2020)
  - Total: 1,482
  - Density: 40.23/sq mi (15.53/km^{2})
- Time zone: UTC-6 (CST)
  - Summer (DST): UTC-5 (CDT)
- ZIP codes: 62830, 62864, 62889
- FIPS code: 17-081-25986

Field Township is one of sixteen townships in Jefferson County, Illinois, USA. As of the 2020 census, its population was 1,482 and it contained 648 housing units.

== Geography ==
According to the 2021 census gazetteer files, Field Township has a total area of 37.03 square miles (95.91 km^{2}), of which 36.84 square miles (95.42 km^{2}) (or 99.49%) is land and 0.19 square miles (0.49 km^{2}) (or 0.51%) is water. The township is centered at 38°26′N 88°52′W (38.433,-88.867).

=== Unincorporated towns ===
- Divide at 38.447°N 88.830°W
- Texico at 38.440°N 88.897°W

(This list is based on USGS data and may include former settlements.)

=== Adjacent townships ===
- Haines Township, Marion County (north)
- Farrington Township (east)
- Webber Township (southeast)
- Mt. Vernon Township (south)
- Shiloh Township (southwest)
- Rome Township (west)
- Raccoon Township, Marion County (northwest)

=== Cemeteries ===
The township contains these eight cemeteries: Antioch, Hall, Hickey, Jordan Chapel, Oak Grove, Old Panther Fork, Panther Fork and Union Chapel.

=== Lakes ===
- Miller Lake

== Demographics ==
As of the 2020 census there were 1,482 people, 633 households, and 450 families residing in the township. The population density was 40.02 inhabitants per square mile (15.45/km^{2}). There were 648 housing units at an average density of 17.50 per square mile (6.76/km^{2}). The racial makeup of the township was 95.61% White, 0.61% African American, 0.34% Native American, 0.20% Asian, 0.00% Pacific Islander, 0.20% from other races, and 3.04% from two or more races. Hispanic or Latino of any race were 1.35% of the population.

There were 633 households, out of which 36.00% had children under the age of 18 living with them, 58.61% were married couples living together, 5.53% had a female householder with no spouse present, and 28.91% were non-families. 26.20% of all households were made up of individuals, and 9.50% had someone living alone who was 65 years of age or older. The average household size was 2.47 and the average family size was 2.92.

The township's age distribution consisted of 24.8% under the age of 18, 7.6% from 18 to 24, 12.7% from 25 to 44, 39.1% from 45 to 64, and 15.9% who were 65 years of age or older. The median age was 46.9 years. For every 100 females, there were 101.5 males. For every 100 females age 18 and over, there were 95.8 males.

The median income for a household in the township was $59,640, and the median income for a family was $75,000. Males had a median income of $41,023 versus $27,841 for females. The per capita income for the township was $29,851. About 4.2% of families and 5.8% of the population were below the poverty line, including 5.9% of those under age 18 and 5.6% of those age 65 or over.

Historical population
Census	Pop.	Note	%±
2000	1,566		—
2010	1,468		−6.3%
2020	1,482		1.0%
U.S. Decennial Census

== Political districts ==
- Illinois' 19th congressional district
- State House District 107
- State Senate District 54
