= Garden Hill Township, Wayne County, Illinois =

Garden Hill Township
- Township

- Location of Illinois in the United States
- Coordinates: 38°35′12″N 88°38′18″W
- Country: United States
- State: Illinois
- County: Wayne

Area
  - Total: 18.6 sq mi (48 km^{2})
  - Land: 18.58 sq mi (48.1 km^{2})
  - Water: 0.01 sq mi (0.026 km^{2})
- Elevation: 528 ft (161 m)

Population (2010)
  - Estimate (2016): 144
- Time zone: UTC-6 (CST)
  - Summer (DST): UTC-5 (CDT)
- ZIP code: XXXXX
- Area code: 618
- FIPS code: 17-191-28534

Garden Hill Township is located in Wayne County, Illinois. As of the 2010 census, its population was 145 and it contained 73 housing units.

== Geography ==
According to the 2010 census, the township has a total area of 18.6 square miles (48 km^{2}), of which 18.58 square miles (48.1 km^{2}) (or 99.89%) is land and 0.01 square miles (0.026 km^{2}) (or 0.05%) is water.

== Demographics ==
Historical population
Census	Pop.	Note	%±
2016 (est.)	144
U.S. Decennial Census
