= Rinard, Illinois =

Rinard
- Unincorporated community
- Location of Rinard within Illinois Rinard (the United States)
- Coordinates: 38°34′15″N 88°27′53″W
- Country: United States
- State: Illinois
- County: Wayne

Area
  - Total: 44 sq mi (110 km^{2})
  - Land: 44 sq mi (110 km^{2})

Population (2000)
  - Total: 463
  - Density: 11/sq mi (4.1/km^{2})
- Time zone: UTC-6 (CST)
  - Summer (DST): UTC-5 (CDT)
- Postal code: 62878
- Area code: 618

Rinard is an unincorporated community in Wayne County, Illinois, United States. The population was 463 at the 2000 census.

== Geography ==
Rinard is in Keith Township and located at 38°34′15″N 88°27′53″W (38.570926, -88.4646).

According to the United States Census Bureau, the city has a total area of 44.1 square miles (114 km^{2}), all of it land.

== Demographics ==
As of the census of 2000, there were 463 people residing within the boundaries of the community's ZIP code, 62878. The population density was 10.49 people per square mile. There were 227 housing units. The racial makeup of the city was 99.4% White, and 0.2% from two or more races. Hispanic or Latino of any race were 0.4% of the population. It once had a post office but it closed.

There were 227 households. 63.7% were married couples living together.

The median income for a household in the city was $33,000. About 7.4% of the population were below the poverty line.
