= Marion County, Illinois =

County in Illinois, United States

- County
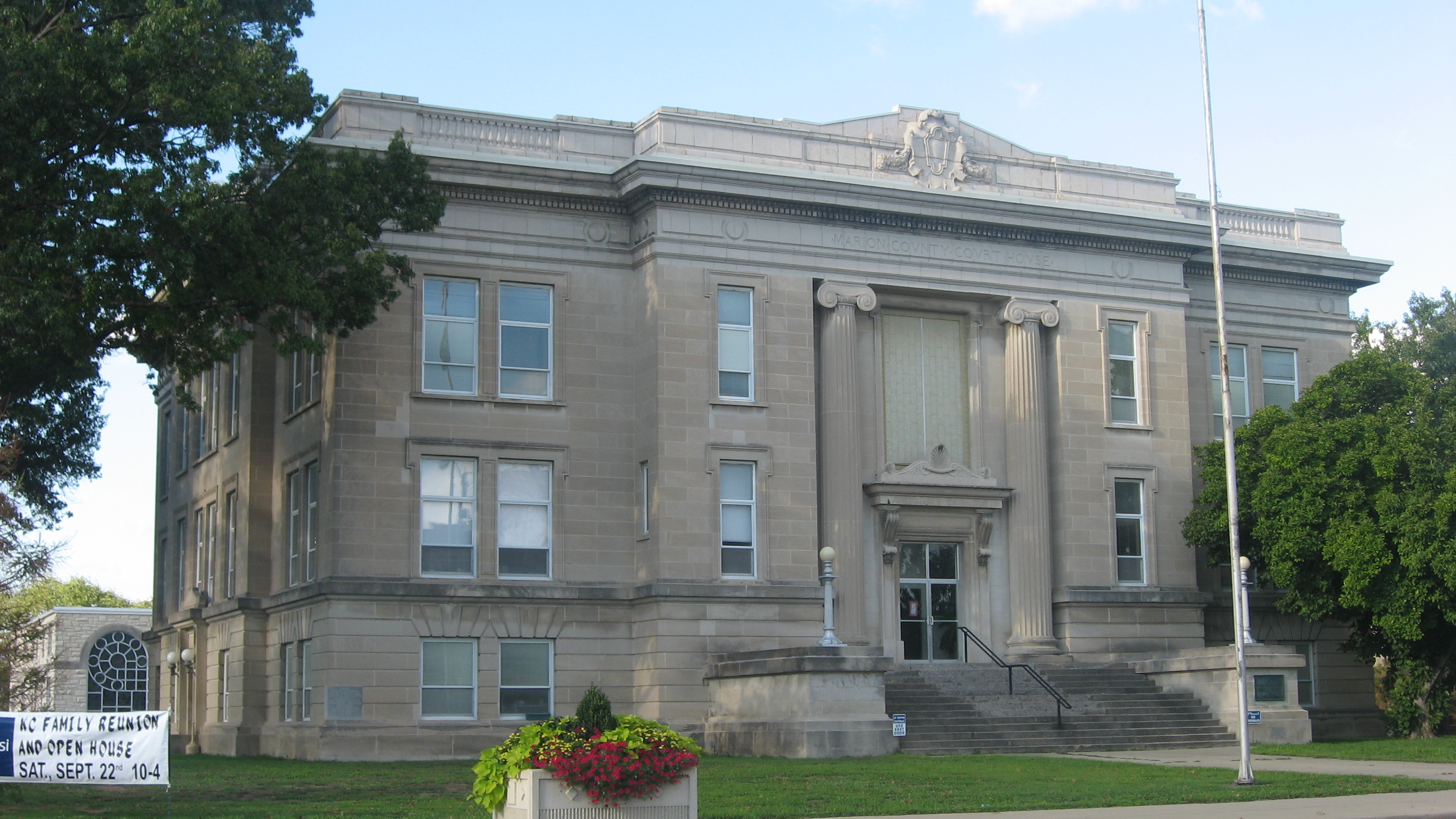
- Marion County Courthouse in Salem

- Flag

- Location within the U.S. state of Illinois
- Coordinates: 38°39′N 88°55′W
- Country: United States
- State: Illinois
- Founded: 1823
- Named for: Francis Marion
- Seat: Salem
- Largest city: Centralia

Area
  - Total: 576 sq mi (1,490 km^{2})
  - Land: 572 sq mi (1,480 km^{2})
  - Water: 3.7 sq mi (9.6 km^{2}) 0.6%

Population (2020)
  - Total: 37,729
  - Estimate (2025): 36,382 ▼
  - Density: 66.0/sq mi (25.5/km^{2})
- Time zone: UTC−6 (Central)
  - Summer (DST): UTC−5 (CDT)
- Congressional district: 15th
- Website: marioncountyil.gov

Marion County is a county located in the U.S. state of Illinois, in the southern half of the state known as "Little Egypt". According to the 2020 census, it had a population of 37,729. Its county seat is Salem. Marion County comprises the Centralia, IL Micropolitan Statistical Area, which is included in the St. Louis-St. Charles-Farmington, MO-IL Combined Statistical Area.

== History ==
Marion County was organized on January 24, 1823, from portions of Jefferson and Fayette counties. It was named in honor of Revolutionary War Gen. Francis Marion, the "Swamp Fox".

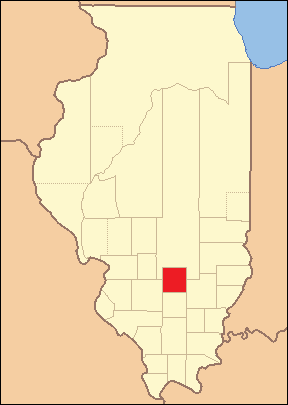
Marion County at the time of its creation in 1823

== Geography ==
According to the U.S. Census Bureau, the county has a total area of 576 square miles (1,490 km^{2}), of which 572 square miles (1,480 km^{2}) is land and 3.7 square miles (9.6 km^{2}) (0.6%) is water.

The southwest corner of Marion County is the intersection of the Baseline with the Third Principal Meridian, the point of origin for the third survey of the Northwest Territory under the Land Ordinance of 1785. The origin is marked with a boulder south of Centralia just off U.S. 51.

=== Climate and weather ===
Salem, Illinois

Climate chart (precipitation, max. and min. temperature)
J	F	M	A	M	J	J	A	S	O	N	D
2.5 37 18	2.5 43 22	4 54 33	4 65 44	4.4 75 54	4.2 84 63	3.9 88 68	3.4 87 66	3.2 80 57	3.1 69 45	4.1 54 34	3.3 42 24
- █ Average max. and min. temperatures in °F
- █ Precipitation totals in inches
- Source: The Weather Channel
Metric conversion
J	F	M	A	M	J	J	A	S	O	N	D
62 3 −8	64 6 −6	101 12 1	102 18 7	111 24 12	105 29 17	99 31 20	87 31 19	82 27 14	79 21 7	105 12 1	83 6 −4
- █ Average max. and min. temperatures in °C
- █ Precipitation totals in mm

In recent years, average temperatures in the county seat of Salem have ranged from a low of 18 °F (−8 °C) in January to a high of 88 °F (31 °C) in July, although a record low of −23 °F (−31 °C) was recorded in January 1994 and a record high of 105 °F (41 °C) was recorded in August 1983. Average monthly precipitation ranged from 2.46 inches (62 mm) in January to 4.37 inches (111 mm) in May.

=== Transit ===
- South Central Transit

=== Major highways ===
- Interstate 57
- U.S. Route 50
- U.S. Route 51
- Illinois Route 37
- Illinois Route 161

=== Adjacent counties ===
- Fayette County - north
- Clay County - east
- Wayne County - southeast
- Jefferson County - south
- Washington County - southwest
- Clinton County - west

== Demographics ==
Historical population
Census	Pop.	Note	%±
1830	2,125		—
1840	4,742		123.2%
1850	6,720		41.7%
1860	12,739		89.6%
1870	20,622		61.9%
1880	23,686		14.9%
1890	24,341		2.8%
1900	30,446		25.1%
1910	35,094		15.3%
1920	37,497		6.8%
1930	35,635		−5.0%
1940	47,989		34.7%
1950	41,700		−13.1%
1960	39,349		−5.6%
1970	38,986		−0.9%
1980	43,523		11.6%
1990	41,561		−4.5%
2000	41,691		0.3%
2010	39,437		−5.4%
2020	37,729		−4.3%
2025 (est.)	36,382	▼	−3.6%
U.S. Decennial Census; 1790-1960 1900-1990; 1990-2000 2010

=== 2020 census ===
As of the 2020 census, the county had a population of 37,729. The median age was 42.7 years, with 22.7% of residents under the age of 18 and 21.2% aged 65 or older. For every 100 females there were 96.2 males, and for every 100 females age 18 and over there were 93.1 males age 18 and over.

52.2% of residents lived in urban areas, while 47.8% lived in rural areas.

There were 15,620 households in the county, of which 28.0% had children under the age of 18 living in them. Of all households, 44.8% were married-couple households, 19.2% were households with a male householder and no spouse or partner present, and 28.2% were households with a female householder and no spouse or partner present. About 30.7% of all households were made up of individuals and 15.4% had someone living alone who was 65 years of age or older.

There were 17,358 housing units, of which 10.0% were vacant. Among occupied housing units, 73.7% were owner-occupied and 26.3% were renter-occupied. The homeowner vacancy rate was 1.6% and the rental vacancy rate was 9.1%.

=== Racial and ethnic composition ===
Marion County, Illinois – Racial and ethnic composition Note: the US Census treats Hispanic/Latino as an ethnic category. This table excludes Latinos from the racial categories and assigns them to a separate category. Hispanics/Latinos may be of any race.
Race / Ethnicity (NH = Non-Hispanic)	Pop 1980	Pop 1990	Pop 2000	Pop 2010	Pop 2020	% 1980	% 1990	% 2000	% 2010	% 2020
White alone (NH)	41,487	39,477	38,951	36,456	33,150	95.32%	94.99%	93.43%	92.44%	87.86%
Black or African American alone (NH)	1,518	1,507	1,593	1,536	1,509	3.49%	3.63%	3.82%	3.89%	4.00%
Native American or Alaska Native alone (NH)	68	106	85	105	94	0.16%	0.26%	0.20%	0.27%	0.25%
Asian alone (NH)	138	227	235	224	349	0.32%	0.55%	0.56%	0.57%	0.93%
Native Hawaiian or Pacific Islander alone (NH)	x	x	15	9	1	x	x	0.04%	0.02%	0.00%
Other race alone (NH)	42	12	26	11	97	0.10%	0.03%	0.06%	0.03%	0.26%
Mixed race or Multiracial (NH)	x	x	408	554	1,817	x	x	0.98%	1.40%	4.82%
Hispanic or Latino (any race)	270	232	378	542	712	0.62%	0.56%	0.91%	1.37%	1.89%
Total	43,523	41,561	41,691	39,437	37,729	100.00%	100.00%	100.00%	100.00%	100.00%

=== 2010 census ===
As of the 2010 United States census, there were 39,437 people, 16,148 households, and 10,746 families residing in the county. The population density was 68.9 inhabitants per square mile (26.6/km^{2}). There were 18,296 housing units at an average density of 32.0 per square mile (12.4/km^{2}). The racial makeup of the county was 93.1% white, 3.9% black or African American, 0.6% Asian, 0.3% American Indian, 0.4% from other races, and 1.6% from two or more races. Those of Hispanic or Latino origin made up 1.4% of the population. In terms of ancestry, 27.5% were German, 15.8% were Irish, 13.6% were English, and 10.8% were American.

Of the 16,148 households, 30.9% had children under the age of 18 living with them, 48.9% were married couples living together, 12.8% had a female householder with no husband present, 33.5% were non-families, and 28.8% of all households were made up of individuals. The average household size was 2.40 and the average family size was 2.91. The median age was 41.4 years.

The median income for a household in the county was $38,974 and the median income for a family was $50,518. Males had a median income of $41,428 versus $28,042 for females. The per capita income for the county was $20,493. About 12.2% of families and 16.5% of the population were below the poverty line, including 23.9% of those under age 18 and 9.6% of those age 65 or over.

== Communities ==
=== Cities ===
- Centralia
- Kinmundy
- Salem
- Wamac

=== Villages ===
- Alma
- Central City
- Iuka
- Junction City
- Kell
- Odin
- Patoka
- Sandoval
- Vernon
- Walnut Hill

=== Townships ===
Marion County is divided into seventeen townships:

- Alma
- Carrigan
- Centralia
- Foster
- Haines
- Iuka
- Kinmundy
- Meacham
- Odin
- Omega
- Patoka
- Raccoon
- Romine
- Salem
- Sandoval
- Stevenson
- Tonti

=== Unincorporated communities ===
- Greendale
- Tonti

== Politics ==
Initially a strongly Democratic anti-Yankee county, Marion County has undergone two transitions. Between 1912 and 2004 it was a perfect bellwether apart from the Catholicism-influenced 1960 election when substantial anti-Catholic voting by its largely southern white population caused it to support Republican Richard Nixon. Since the beginning of the twenty-first century it has voted consistently for Republican presidential candidates.

United States presidential election results for Marion County, Illinois
Year	Republican		Democratic		Third party(ies)	
Year	No.	%	No.	%	No.	%
1892	2,324	39.88%	2,709	46.49%	794	13.63%
1896	2,870	42.32%	3,835	56.55%	77	1.14%
1900	3,221	43.88%	3,928	53.51%	191	2.60%
1904	3,190	47.25%	2,490	36.88%	1,071	15.86%
1908	3,435	43.14%	4,001	50.24%	527	6.62%
1912	1,586	20.10%	3,493	44.26%	2,813	35.64%
1916	6,438	42.99%	7,892	52.70%	646	4.31%
1920	6,620	52.06%	4,351	34.22%	1,744	13.72%
1924	5,889	44.01%	4,768	35.63%	2,724	20.36%
1928	9,110	60.52%	5,823	38.69%	119	0.79%
1932	6,276	36.11%	10,791	62.09%	313	1.80%
1936	8,321	42.79%	10,820	55.64%	305	1.57%
1940	10,461	42.74%	13,807	56.41%	208	0.85%
1944	9,408	47.90%	10,079	51.32%	153	0.78%
1948	7,798	46.19%	8,878	52.58%	208	1.23%
1952	10,804	53.64%	9,317	46.26%	19	0.09%
1956	10,813	55.78%	8,551	44.11%	21	0.11%
1960	11,121	54.92%	9,116	45.02%	13	0.06%
1964	7,060	36.35%	12,363	63.65%	0	0.00%
1968	8,134	46.09%	7,737	43.84%	1,778	10.07%
1972	10,755	60.58%	6,968	39.25%	31	0.17%
1976	8,729	46.63%	9,834	52.53%	157	0.84%
1980	10,969	58.73%	6,990	37.42%	719	3.85%
1984	11,300	59.65%	7,599	40.11%	46	0.24%
1988	8,695	50.05%	8,592	49.46%	86	0.50%
1992	5,764	30.52%	9,669	51.20%	3,450	18.27%
1996	5,999	38.06%	7,792	49.43%	1,972	12.51%
2000	8,240	49.45%	8,068	48.42%	355	2.13%
2004	9,413	54.65%	7,694	44.67%	117	0.68%
2008	8,691	49.92%	8,345	47.93%	374	2.15%
2012	9,248	58.46%	6,225	39.35%	347	2.19%
2016	11,859	69.36%	4,369	25.55%	870	5.09%
2020	12,678	72.47%	4,524	25.86%	292	1.67%
2024	12,409	73.85%	4,116	24.50%	278	1.65%

== See also ==
- National Register of Historic Places listings in Marion County, Illinois
