= Orchard Township, Wayne County, Illinois =

Orchard Township
- Township

- Location of Illinois in the United States
- Coordinates: 38°31′00″N 88°38′30″W
- Country: United States
- State: Illinois
- County: Wayne
- Organized: November 8, 1859

Area
  - Total: 37.06 sq mi (96.0 km^{2})
  - Land: 36.87 sq mi (95.5 km^{2})
  - Water: 0.19 sq mi (0.49 km^{2})
- Elevation: 499 ft (152 m)

Population (2010)
  - Estimate (2016): 591
- Time zone: UTC-6 (CST)
  - Summer (DST): UTC-5 (CDT)
- ZIP code: XXXXX
- Area code: 618
- FIPS code: 17-191-56367

Orchard Township is located in Wayne County, Illinois.

== Geography ==
According to the 2010 census, the township has a total area of 37.06 square miles (96.0 km^{2}), of which 36.87 square miles (95.5 km^{2}) (or 99.49%) is land and 0.19 square miles (0.49 km^{2}) (or 0.51%) is water.

=== Zenith ===
Zenith is an unincorporated community in the township. It is located on County Route 18 18.5 miles (29.8 km) northwest of Fairfield.

== Demographics ==
Historical population
Census	Pop.	Note	%±
2016 (est.)	591
U.S. Decennial Census

As of the 2010 census, its population was 604 and it contained 241 housing units.
