= Hickory Hill Township, Wayne County, Illinois =

Hickory Hill Township
- Township

- Location of Illinois in the United States
- Coordinates: 38°25′10″N 88°38′50″W
- Country: United States
- State: Illinois
- County: Wayne
- Organized: November 8, 1859

Area
  - Total: 42.68 sq mi (110.5 km^{2})
  - Land: 42.62 sq mi (110.4 km^{2})
  - Water: 0.07 sq mi (0.18 km^{2})
- Elevation: 453 ft (138 m)

Population (2010)
  - Estimate (2016): 407
- Time zone: UTC-6 (CST)
  - Summer (DST): UTC-5 (CDT)
- ZIP code: XXXXX
- Area code: 618
- FIPS code: 17-191-34501

Hickory Hill Township is located in Wayne County, Illinois. As of the 2010 census, its population was 413 and it contained 177 housing units.

== Geography ==
According to the 2010 census, the township has a total area of 42.68 square miles (110.5 km^{2}), of which 42.62 square miles (110.4 km^{2}) (or 99.86%) is land and 0.07 square miles (0.18 km^{2}) (or 0.16%) is water.

== Demographics ==
Historical population
Census	Pop.	Note	%±
2016 (est.)	407
U.S. Decennial Census
