= Vernon, Illinois =

- Village
- Location in Marion County, Illinois
- Coordinates: 38°48′05″N 89°05′15″W
- Country: United States
- State: Illinois
- County: Marion
- Township: Patoka

Area
  - Total: 0.88 sq mi (2.28 km^{2})
  - Land: 0.88 sq mi (2.28 km^{2})
  - Water: 0 sq mi (0.00 km^{2})
- Elevation: 515 ft (157 m)

Population (2020)
  - Total: 103
  - Density: 117/sq mi (45.1/km^{2})
- Time zone: UTC-6 (CST)
  - Summer (DST): UTC-5 (CDT)
- ZIP code: 62892
- Area code: 618
- FIPS code: 17-77681
- GNIS ID: 2400061

Vernon is a village in Marion County, Illinois, United States. The population was 103 at the 2020 census.

== History ==
The village was established in 1872 by the Illinois Central Railroad. The community is named for one of the railway's auditors, William Vernon.

Vernon is the birthplace of Herbert Ryman, an artist at Walt Disney Studios.

== Geography ==
Vernon is located in northwestern Marion County. U.S. Route 51 passes through the village, leading south 3 miles (5 km) to Patoka and north 11 miles (18 km) to Vandalia. Salem, the Marion county seat, is 18 miles (29 km) to the southeast.

According to the U.S. Census Bureau, Vernon has a total area of 0.88 square miles (2.28 km^{2}), all land. The village is drained to the south by a tributary of the North Fork, which in turn flows to the Kaskaskia River in Carlyle Lake, 8 miles (13 km) southwest of the village.

== Demographics ==
Historical population
Census	Pop.	Note	%±
1910	333		—
1920	230		−30.9%
1930	245		6.5%
1940	290		18.4%
1950	243		−16.2%
1960	235		−3.3%
1970	203		−13.6%
1980	199		−2.0%
1990	207		4.0%
2000	178		−14.0%
2010	129		−27.5%
2020	103		−20.2%
U.S. Decennial Census

As of the census of 2000, there were 178 people, 77 households, and 46 families residing in the village. The population density was 195.5 inhabitants per square mile (75.5/km^{2}). There were 83 housing units at an average density of 91.1 units per square mile (35.2 units/km^{2}). The racial makeup of the village was 98.31% White, 0.56% Native American, and 1.12% from two or more races. Hispanic or Latino of any race were 1.69% of the population.

There were 77 households, out of which 18.2% had children under the age of 18 living with them, 46.8% were married couples living together, 7.8% had a female householder with no husband present, and 39.0% were non-families. 35.1% of all households were made up of individuals, and 14.3% had someone living alone who was 65 years of age or older. The average household size was 2.31 and the average family size was 3.00.

In the village, the population was spread out, with 21.9% under the age of 18, 7.3% from 18 to 24, 27.5% from 25 to 44, 25.8% from 45 to 64, and 17.4% who were 65 years of age or older. The median age was 41 years. For every 100 females, there were 117.1 males. For every 100 females age 18 and over, there were 95.8 males.

The median income for a household in the village was $21,667, and the median income for a family was $24,583. Males had a median income of $30,625 versus $16,250 for females. The per capita income for the village was $9,686. About 17.9% of families and 27.4% of the population were below the poverty line, including 21.6% of those under the age of eighteen and 17.4% of those 65 or over.

== Economy ==
The Patoka Oil Terminal is located between Patoka and Vernon. It is an "oil hub" that connects many oil pipelines, similar to the much larger oil tank farm near Cushing, Oklahoma. Some of the pipelines that connect to this oil tank farm are Dakota Access Pipeline, Enbridge Pipeline System, Keystone Pipeline, Trunkline Pipeline.

== See also ==
- List of oil pipelines
