= Foster Township, Marion County, Illinois =

Foster Township
- Township

- Location of Illinois in the United States
- Coordinates: 38°47′N 88°59′W
- Country: United States
- State: Illinois
- County: Marion
- Settled: November 4, 1873

Area
  - Total: 35.55 sq mi (92.1 km^{2})
  - Land: 35.51 sq mi (92.0 km^{2})
  - Water: 0.04 sq mi (0.10 km^{2})
- Elevation: 535 ft (163 m)

Population (2010)
  - Estimate (2016): 371
  - Density: 10.7/sq mi (4.1/km^{2})
- Time zone: UTC-6 (CST)
  - Summer (DST): UTC-5 (CDT)
- FIPS code: 17-121-27195
- Website: Geocities

As of the 2010 census, its population was 379 and it contained 193 housing units. Foster Township is mainly a farming community with corn, wheat and soy beans being the major crop. It no longer has towns or villages within its boundaries.

== Geography ==
Foster Township (T4N R2E) is located in Marion County, Illinois. It is centered at 38°47'N 88°59'W (38.783, -88.981). It is located in the northern part of Marion County, bordering Fayette County on its north, and the townships of Kinmundy to its east, Tonti on its south, and Patoka to its west.

Wildlife includes deer, turkey, rabbits and raccoons and an occasional coyote or bobcat. The township consists of flat prairie on the north and west and timber and hills in the south and east.

According to the 2010 census, the township has a total area of 35.55 square miles (92.1 km^{2}), of which 35.51 square miles (92.0 km^{2}) (or 99.89%) is land and 0.04 square miles (0.10 km^{2}) (or 0.11%) is water.

== Demographics ==
Historical population
| Census | Pop. | Note | %± |
|---|---|---|---|
| 2016 (est.) | 371 |
U.S. Decennial Census

== Cemeteries ==
There are nine cemeteries in the township:

- Doolen Cemetery - Just south of Vermundy Road on the west side of McNicol Road.
- Holt Cemetery - South side of Vermundy Road, east of Lester, Jones Road.
- Doolen-North Fork Cemetery - North side of Vermundy Road, west of Small Lane.
- Conant Cemetery - South of Vermundy Road on west side of Griffin Road, just before the creek.
- Foster Cemetery - Basically a couple graves in the woods.
- Sandy Branch Cemetery - Southwest corner of Sandy Branch and Brimberry Roads.
- Jones Cemetery - On the west side of Jones Road, south of Kinoka Road.
- Caldwell Cemetery - East side of Mona Road, just south of Berry Road.
- Martin Cemetery - On the south side of Hicks Road, just east of Martin Road.

== Adjacent townships ==
- Wilberton Township, Fayette County (north)
- Lone Grove Township, Fayette County (northeast)
- Kinmundy Township (east)
- Alma Township (southeast)
- Tonti Township (south)
- Carrigan Township (southwest)
- Patoka Township (west)
- Kaskaskia Township, Fayette County (northwest)
