= Tar Sands Blockade =

Grassroots climate justice coalition

- Website type: Nonviolent Direct Action, Environmental Campaign
- Website: tarsandsblockade.org
- Registration: Optional
- Launched: 2012
- Current status: Active

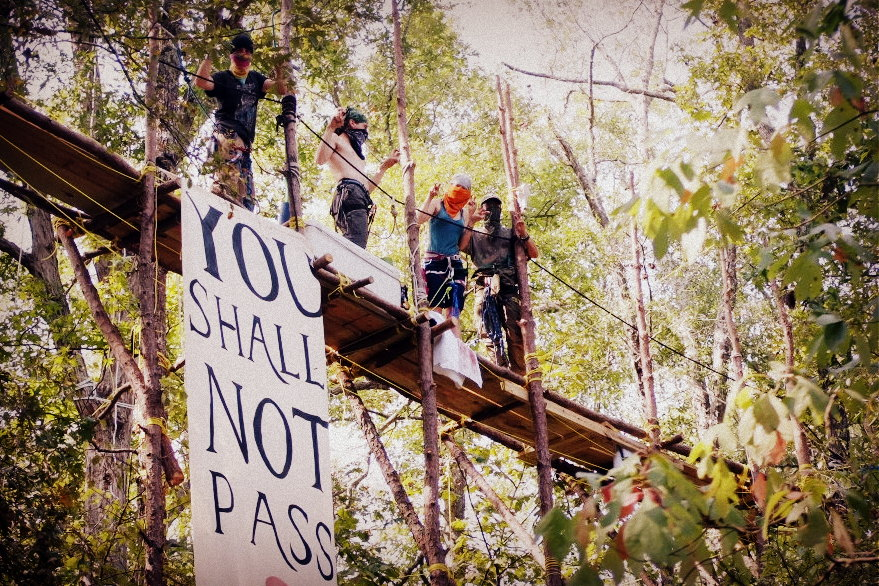
Four tree-sitters of the Tar Sands Blockade at their tree village in Winnsboro, Texas. The "You Shall Not Pass" banner is addressed to TransCanada's pipeline construction workers.

Tar Sands Blockade is a grassroots coalition of affected Texas and Oklahoma people and climate justice organizers who use peaceful and sustained civil disobedience to stop the Keystone XL tar sands pipeline. Tar Sands Blockade used nonviolent direct action to stop construction of the pipeline throughout East Texas including banner drops, lockdowns, and tree sits. They are best known for a large scale tree sit outside Winnsboro, Texas.

Naomi Klein attributes the origin of the term Blockadia, which describes a global anti-extractivist movement to the hour-long documentary Blockadia Rising (2013) that Tar Sands Blockade produced to describe the dangers of tar sands extraction and highlight their direct actions.

The group occupied blockades for 86 days in 2012, forcing TransCanada to reroute the pipeline.

== Political and environmental issues ==
TransCanada, a multinational corporation, was building the Gulf Coast Project section of the Keystone XL with the go ahead from the Obama administration in 2012. This section of the pipeline passed from Oklahoma through East Texas into the Gulf. Anti-pipeline activists and environmental organizations claimed that probable pipe spillage would threaten groundwater, ecosystems, surrounding lands, employment, and the economy. The pipeline would cross 631 streams and wetlands in Texas, including not the Sulphur River and the entire Carrizo-Wilcox Aquifer, which is the water supply for 12 million homes in East Texas.

A whistleblower, Evan Vokes, came forward about TransCanada in mid-October 2012, to confirm allegations of regulatory non-compliance.

== See also ==
- Keystone XL pipeline
- Carrizo-Wilcox Aquifer
- Tree sitting
- Line 3 Pipeline
