= Corporate behaviour =

Actions of a company or other corporate group

Corporate behaviour is the actions of a company or group that is acting as a single body. It defines the company's ethical strategies and describes the image of the company. Studies on corporate behaviour show the link between corporate communication and the formation of its identity.

== Role ==
Not only does corporate behaviour play various roles within different areas of a business, it also enables businesses to overcome any problems they may face. For example, due to an increase in globalisation, language barriers are likely to increase for organisations, creating major problems as day-to-day business may be disrupted. Corporate behaviour enables managers to overcome this problem by improving flexibility. Also, many businesses are struggling to remain competitive in terms of quality and productivity due to intense competition within markets. However, corporate behaviour is able to fix this issue by allowing managers to empower their employees, as they are the ones who are able to make a change. Positive corporate behaviour can result in employees feeling happy and content at work, providing the best outcome. This is beneficial for management as it could lead to effective teams being created, thus resulting in innovative ideas, which are beneficial for the business. It also helps to decrease labour turnover, enabling the organisation to retain its most valuable employees.

== Importance ==
Corporate behaviour is important in strengthening relationships within organisations between individuals, teams, and in the organisation as a whole. It is important as it reflects the values of the business and the extent to which it is ethical. Corporate behavior refers to the company values that define it and make it different and better than other companies. Portraying positive corporate behavior within a company facilitates strong brand image creation; consequently, branding then strengthens the importance associated with corporate behavior.

== Influential factors ==
PESTLE factors influence corporate behaviour in many ways. They cause organisations to change the way they operate; however, the size and nature of the change are dependent upon which factor is causing the change (political, economic, social, technological, legal, or environmental). External forces are a significant factor of influence over corporate behaviour, hence the term corporate citizenship.

=== Political ===
Political factors such as property rights, the rule of law and the status of governments influence corporate and economic landscapes. Examples of political factors could be changes in government legislation. This could affect an organisation's corporate behaviour as they would have to change the way they operate in order to implement these changes; some employees may not like the new changes made.

=== Economic ===
Recession is an example of an economic factor. If the economy were to be in a recession, businesses may find they have to reduce jobs. This would affect corporate behaviour as business teams would be short of skills and ideas in order to operate effectively. According to the 2013 National Business Ethics Survey of the US workforce, economy and misconduct are not interdependent, which was the traditional view. The report suggested that even though the economy grew in 2011 and 2013, misconduct in businesses was at its lowest. A mixed economy signifies intersections of interests between the private sector of corporations, and the public sector of government.

=== Social ===
Changes in trends and the market are social factors that affect corporate behaviour. Organisations may have to change their products or services in order to keep up to date with new trends. In order to do this, employees may be required to learn new skills within a short amount of time to make these changes; relationships between employees and management could be at risk due to these changes. Moral imperatives and expectations are also taken into account. Where social issues are shared by many companies across multiple industries, it may often be addressed most effectively through cooperative models and initiatives.

=== Technological ===
Implementing technology within organisations could mean more virtual meetings and fewer face-to-face meetings. As a result, relationships between management and employees could weaken as a result of fewer face-to-face conversations.

=== Legal ===
Legislative rules, such as taxes may increase, which would increase an organisation's costs. Changes such as changing the way the organisation operates may have to be made in order to cover these extra costs.

=== Environmental ===
Corporate Environmental Responsibility aims to create goodwill for corporations in various ways, with regard to society. Environmental factors could be any factors that prevent damage to the environment. For example, remote work may be required to reduce the number of employees physically travelling to offices, thus reducing greenhouse gas emissions. However, this may lead to isolation as communication is reduced, weakening corporate behaviour within firms.

== Stakeholder influence ==
Businesses have many stakeholders who influence corporate behaviour. However, businesses that adopt the stakeholder theory are likely to appeal more to their stakeholders as they are showing their care and commitment towards them. This helps to strengthen the corporate behaviour within a firm and reduces the need for stakeholders to demand change. With the various factors affecting society and the economy in modern times, stakeholders are increasingly showing an interest in Corporate Social Responsibility (CSR). Strategic CSR is also considered a marketing strategy and therefore a potential source of competitive advantage.

== See also ==
- Business ethics
- Corporate crime
- Corporate culture
- Corporate governance
- Corporate law
- Corporation
- Normative ethics
- PESTLE
- Shareholder
- Stakeholder concept
