= Blockadia =

Global anti-extractivist social movement

- Non-violent civil movements against extractivist projects.
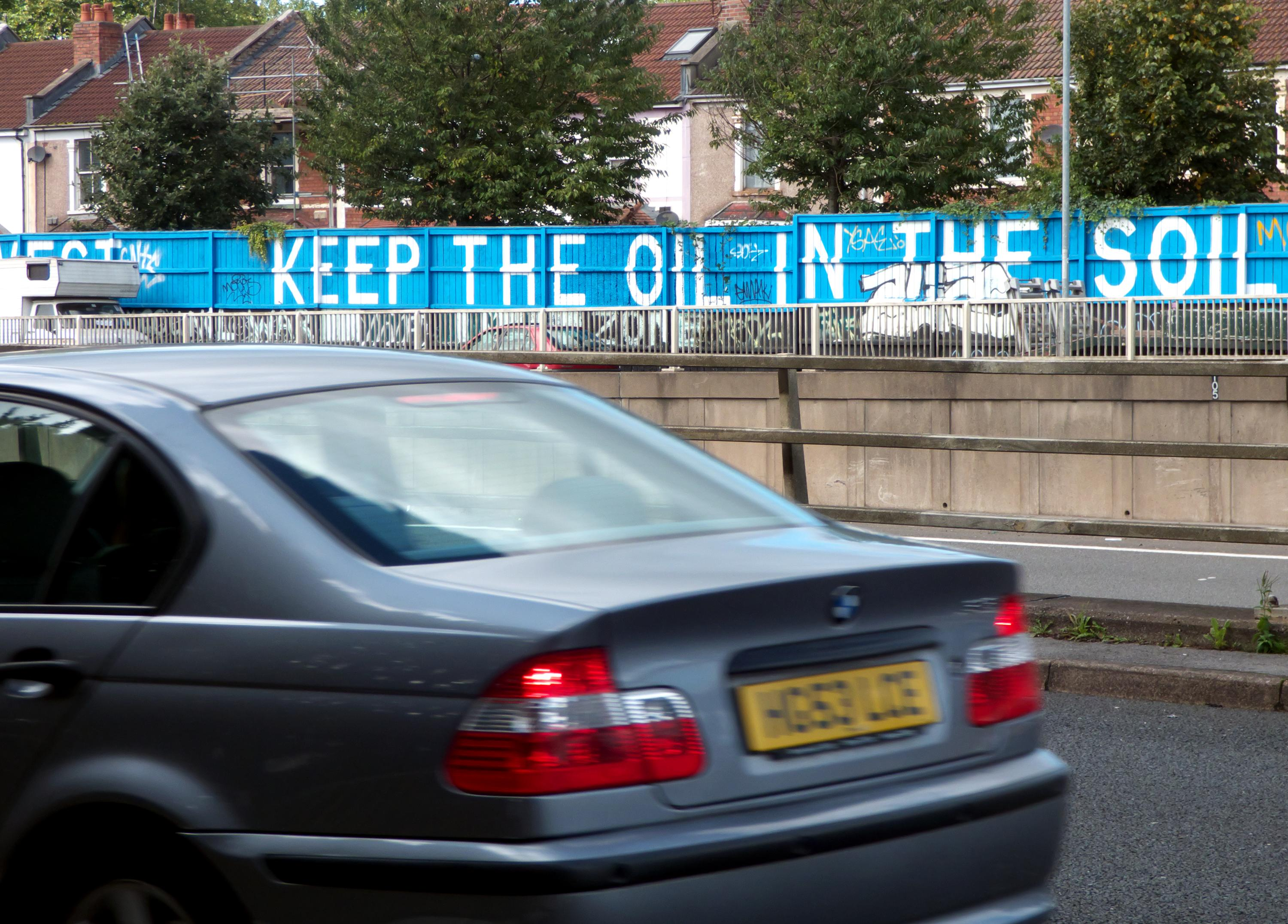
- Graffiti of a common Blockadia movement protest phrase, "Keep the oil in the soil," a protest against extracting natural resources by large corporations
- Location: Worldwide
- Caused by: Extractivism; Environmental conflict; Corporate environmental responsibility
- Methods: Nonviolence; nonviolent resistance; civil disobedience

Blockadia is a global anti-extractivism movement; and a roving, transnational conflict zone where everyday people obstruct development of extractive projects, especially in the fossil fuel industry. Blockadia resistance movements differ from mainstream environmentalism by use of confrontational tactics such as civil disobedience, mass arrests, lockdowns, and blockades to contest perceived threats arising from extractivist projects' contributions to global climate change and local environmental injustice. These movements are also sometimes referred to as "leave fossil fuels underground" (LFFU) movements. Some researchers have concluded that Blockadia movements aim to contribute to a transition toward a more just society. Increasing use of Blockadia tactics may indicate that more people are losing trust in capitalism's ability to avert a climate crisis.

While many examples of Blockadia movements exist worldwide, researcher Joan Martínez-Alier find that many include collective organizing against some or all of the following injustices: violation of human rights, contamination of water and soil, air pollution, unjust land and water acquisition, loss of biodiversity, health impacts, and poor working conditions.

== Background ==
=== Blockadia and carbon emissions ===
Scholars have posited that Blockadia movements are plausibly an avenue for global carbon dioxide emission reduction. The International Energy Agency's report on CO2 Emissions in 2022 cites that global energy-related carbon dioxide emissions reached a high of 38.6 Gt. While international negotiations have resulted in an agreement for promised reduction of 20 billion tons of carbon dioxide per year, scholar Joan Martínez-Alier argues that bottom-up grassroots movements like Blockadia will prove more effective in spurring on reduction of emissions than top-down international policy. This theory remains debated amongst climate scholars.

=== State-corporate crime ===
Failure of corporations and governments to address the climate crisis has been described as state-corporate crime. This has been cited as a driving force for Blockadia and LFFU movements to fight corporations involved in projects that produce extreme levels of carbon emissions. In one particular example, scholars have presented evidence that collusion between the Canadian government and multi-national corporations to develop of the Alberta Tar Sands is an example of state-corporate crime, because tar sands oil is especially resource intensive to extract, refine, and transport. Tar sands contribute disproportionately to carbon emissions. These scholars say that tar sands' contributions to global warming and ecological destruction constitute an assault on humans and other species, including local residents and First Nations communities.

=== Differences with mainstream environmentalism ===
Blockadia's divergence from mainstream environmentalism took place in the context of resistance to tar sands development with this understanding of tar sands' contribution to the climate crisis. In addition to its adoption of confrontational tactics, Blockadia movements differ from mainstream environmentalism by integrating environmental justice concerns and building diverse grassroots coalitions, where environmentalism had previously emphasized NIMBY campaigns, celebrity environmentalism, and advocacy for legislative action.

Blockadia participants tend to be more concerned with legitimacy than legality, and are responding to a perceived planetary emergency. Blockadia movements have formed unexpected alliances between grassroots groups responding to perceived local threats. Blockadia relies primarily on decentralised leadership and frequently organises actions through social media.

Martinez Alier and other scholars describe Blockadia as a network of glocal campaigns with a deeply democratic approach: participants are aware of the connections between local injustice and the global climate crisis. Blockadia's strategies include legal approaches asserting the right to a healthy environment and protecting local means of subsistence.

== History ==
Blockadia's confrontational tactics have a long history in environmental activism. Joan Martínez-Alier points to the Movement for the Survival of the Ogoni People as an important precedent in the use of Blockadia tactics against the fossil fuel industry.

Naomi Klein attributes the origin of the term Blockadia to the activist group Tar Sands Blockade during their resistance to the Keystone XL pipeline in 2012. The group produced an hour-long documentary Blockadia Rising (2013) that described the dangers of tar sands extraction and the group's direct actions, which included a network of blockades and tree-sits that they occupied for 86 days, forcing TransCanada to reroute the pipeline. The struggle against the Keystone XL pipeline effectively introduced Blockadia to the American public.

Klein popularised the term in her 2014 book This Changes Everything to describe a "roving transnational conflict zone…where regular people…are trying to stop this era of extreme extraction with their bodies or in the courts." Klein writes that:

Blockadia is not a specific location on a map but rather a roving transnational conflict zone that is cropping up with increasing frequency and intensity wherever extractive projects are attempting to dig and drill, whether for open-pit mines, or gas fracking, or tar sands oil pipelines.

The term also had early associations with the Idle No More movement.

== Examples ==
The Environmental Justice Atlas has complied several examples of Blockadia campaigns from around the world. Civil society in South Africa has restructured its challenges to state-supported extractivist projects with Blockadia tactics in response to the Marikana massacre of mine workers in 2012.

== Blockadia and health advocacy ==
The right to health is often held at the core of Blockadia organizing against extractivist projects. Health impacts from extractivist projects can take many forms, but often result in forms of toxic pollution, loss of land and clean water (often that of Indigenous peoples), exposure to radiation, and occupational disease. In the case of the Alberta Tar Sands, concern surrounded the tailing ponds in which processed water and solids from extraction were deposited. The water in these ponds were found to contain arsenic, mercury, PAHs, and other toxins. Cancer incidence studies performed for communities who rely on this water found abnormally high rates of cancer within the blood and lymphatic system, soft tissue, and biliary tract, as well as higher rates of lung cancer in women.

The People's Health Movement, a global network of health activists, held an extractivism interest group at their 2012 Assembly in Capetown, South Africa, debating the necessity of extractive industries to finance national health systems whilst also causing harm to vulnerable communities. In the case of the Tar Sands, much advocacy took the approach that a total stop to extraction was out of the question, instead advocating for a slow in production and a switch from liquid tailing to dry tailing to reduce health impacts.

Much of the health concerns from extractivist projects particularly impact workers. Scholar Erika Arteaga-Cruz argues that oftentimes the health impacts remain intentionally inaccessible pieces of information to workers and their communities due to technical language and barriers to sharing health information. However, she argues that the combination of advocacy for workers' rights and health rights have been instrumental and necessary in many examples of successful Blockadia movements.

== Human-nature bonds and Indigenous teachings in Blockadia movements ==
In most extractivist movements, the most heavily affected groups are Indigenous peoples, farmers, pastoralists, and other economically marginalized communities. Many of these communities, and particularly Indigenous communities, emphasize the preservation of human-nature relationships as a focal point of engagement with environmental conflicts. Many of these movements utilize language such as, "We are Nature defending itself" to emphasize the connectivity of humans and the environment when arguing for sustainable practices and infrastructure.

In academic writing about environmental conflicts, researchers widely acknowledge the colonial nature of extractivist projects, perpetuating dispossession of land, culture, and rights to self-determination. However, it is argued that Indigenous teachings and understandings of connecting spirit and Sacred Spaces have long been left out of environmental health academic discourse, despite such teachings being at the forefront of organizing movements.

Additionally, Blockadia movements have facilitated continued connection and alliances between Indigenous groups. In organizing movements against the expansion and creation of the Keystone XL pipeline in the United States, the risk the pipeline posed near the North and South Dakota border brought together organizers from the Cheyenne River Sioux, Standing Rock Sioux, and non-indigenous citizens living in North and South Dakota to set up encampments. Organizer Joye Braun cites the exchange of trainings, traditional teachings, and spiritual workshops for their success in this organizing effort against the Dakota Access pipeline.

== In popular culture ==
Stephen Collis's poetry collection The Barricades Project includes a volume titled "Once in Blockadia" that critiques neoliberalism and cultural nationalism while also noting that poetic critique is insufficient resistance to these issues. "Once in Blockadia" has five sections of poetry and scattered photos and drawings. The sections in order are titled, "Subversal," "Reading Wordsworth in the Tar Sands," "The Port Transcript," "Home at Gasmere," and "One Against Another." In William Lombardi's review titled "Energy Fabulations" about "Once in Blockadia," he explains that the concepts of cultural and biological connectivity are explored against the backdrop of untapped fossil fuel energy that may bring about the destruction of communities.
