= Patoka Township, Marion County, Illinois =

Patoka Township
- Township

- Location of Illinois in the United States
- Coordinates: 38°47′N 89°5′W
- Country: United States
- State: Illinois
- County: Marion
- Settled: November 4, 1873

Area
  - Total: 34.97 sq mi (90.6 km^{2})
  - Land: 34.95 sq mi (90.5 km^{2})
  - Water: 0.03 sq mi (0.078 km^{2})
- Elevation: 499 ft (152 m)

Population (2010)
  - Estimate (2016): 1,009
  - Density: 29.7/sq mi (11.5/km^{2})
- Time zone: UTC-6 (CST)
  - Summer (DST): UTC-5 (CDT)
- FIPS code: 17-121-58070

Patoka Township is located in Marion County, Illinois. As of the 2010 census, its population was 1,038 and it contained 523 housing units.

== Geography ==
Patoka Township (T4N R1E) is centered at 38°47'N 89°5'W (38.780, -89.086). It is traversed north–south by U.S. Route 51 and east–west by the North Fork of the Kaskaskia River. The city of Patoka is located near the south end of the township. According to the 2010 census, the township has a total area of 34.97 square miles (90.6 km^{2}), of which 34.95 square miles (90.5 km^{2}) (or 99.94%) is land and 0.03 square miles (0.078 km^{2}) (or 0.09%) is water.

== Demographics ==
Historical population
Census	Pop.	Note	%±
2016 (est.)	1,009
U.S. Decennial Census

== Adjacent townships ==
- Kaskaskia Township, Fayette County (north)
- Wilberton Township, Fayette County (northeast)
- Foster Township (east)
- Tonti Township (southeast)
- Carrigan Township (south)
- East Fork Township, Clinton County (southwest)
- Pope Township, Fayette County (west)
- Pope Township, Fayette County (northwest)
