= Augsburg, Illinois =

- Unincorporated community
- Location within Illinois Location within the United States
- Coordinates: 38°52′00″N 89°00′48″W
- Country: United States
- State: Illinois
- County: Fayette
- Township: Wilberton
- Named after: Augsburg, Germany
- Elevation: 561 ft (171 m)
- Time zone: UTC-6 (Central (CST))
  - Summer (DST): UTC-5 (CDT)
- Area code: 618
- GNIS feature ID: 422423

Augsburg is an unincorporated community in Wilberton Township, Fayette County, Illinois, United States. Augsburg is located on County Route 23, 7.8 miles (12.6 km) south-southeast of Vandalia.
