= James L. Hull =

- Born: November 27, 1873; Patoka, Illinois, US
- Died: July 25, 1928 (aged 54); Boston, Massachusetts, US
- Military career
- Allegiance: United States
- Branch: United States Navy
- Rank: Fireman First Class
- Unit: U.S.S. Concord
- Conflicts: Spanish–American War
- Awards: Medal of Honor

James Lott Hull (November 27, 1873 – July 25, 1928) was a fireman first class serving in the United States Navy during the Spanish–American War who received the Medal of Honor for bravery.

== Biography ==
Hull was born November 27, 1873, in Patoka, Illinois, and after entering the navy was sent to fight in the Spanish–American War aboard the USS Concord as a fireman first class.

He died on July 25, 1928.

== Medal of Honor citation ==
Rank and organization: Fireman First Class, U.S. Navy. Born: 27 November 1873, Patoka, Ill. Accredited to: Illinois. G.O. No.: 502, 14 December 1898.

Citation:

On board the U.S.S. Concord off Cavite, Manila Bay, Philippine Islands, 21 May 1898. Following the blowing out of a lower manhole plate joint on boiler B of that vessel, Hull assisted in hauling the fires in the hot, vapor-filled atmosphere, which necessitated the playing of water into the fireroom from a hose.

== See also ==
- List of Medal of Honor recipients for the Spanish–American War
