= Amherst, South Dakota =

Amherst
- Unincorporated community
- Location within the state of South Dakota Amherst (the United States)
- Coordinates: 45°44′17″N 97°55′16″W
- Country: United States
- State: South Dakota
- County: Marshall
- Elevation: 1,309 ft (399 m)
- Time zone: UTC-6 (Central (CST))
  - Summer (DST): UTC-5 (CDT)
- ZIP codes: 57421
- Area code: 605
- GNIS feature ID: 1253644

Amherst is an unincorporated community in Marshall County, South Dakota, United States.

== History ==
A post office called Amherst was established in 1887. The community most likely takes its name from Amherst, Massachusetts.

Approximately two and half miles southeast of the village a rupture of the Keystone Pipeline caused what is being called the largest oil spill in South Dakota history on November 16, 2017. The spill is an area about 100 yards in radius within a conservation reserve field about a mile east of 416 Avenue south of the village.
