= Steele City, Nebraska =

- Village
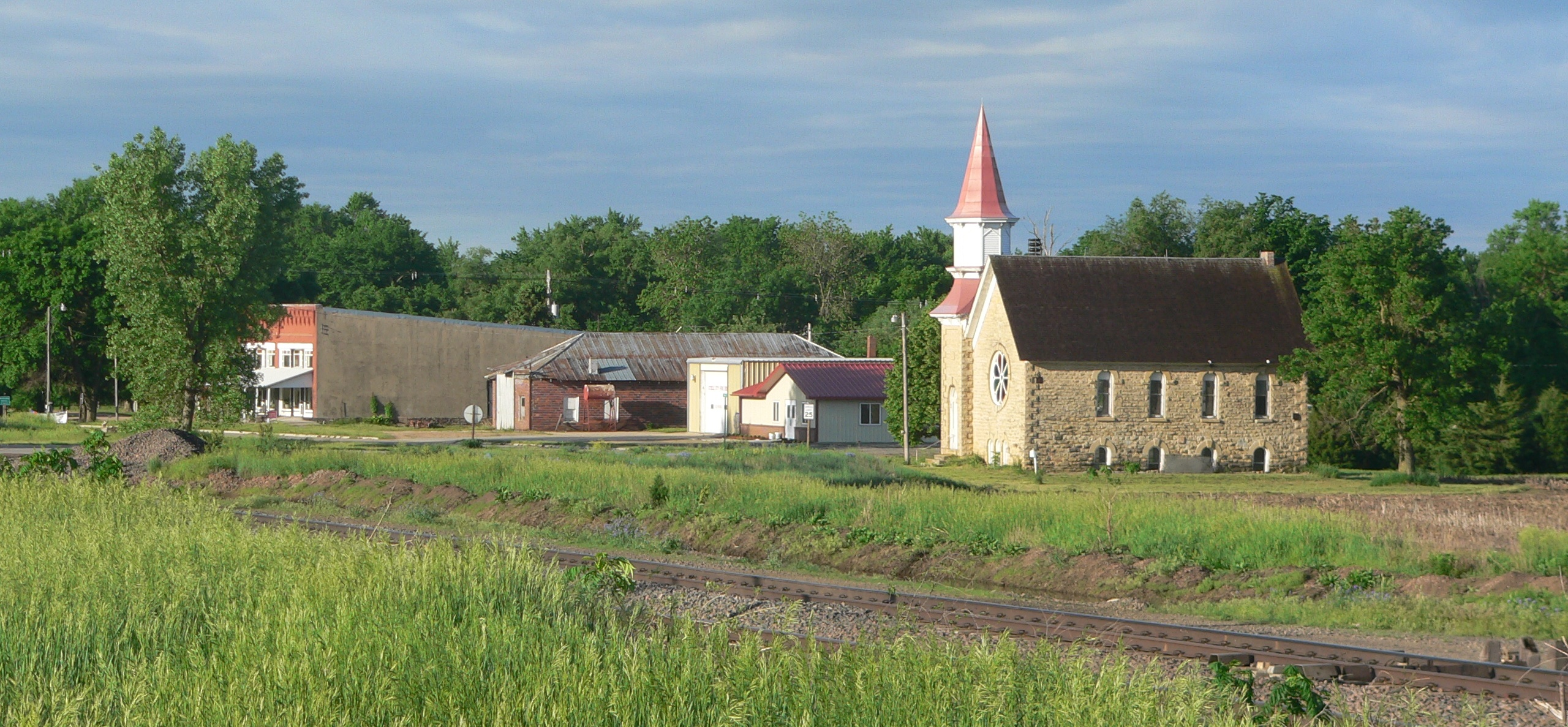
- Downtown Steele City (2013)

- Location within Jefferson County and Nebraska
- Coordinates: 40°02′13″N 97°01′23″W
- Country: United States
- State: Nebraska
- County: Jefferson

Area
  - Total: 0.23 sq mi (0.60 km^{2})
  - Land: 0.23 sq mi (0.60 km^{2})
  - Water: 0 sq mi (0.00 km^{2})
- Elevation: 1,303 ft (397 m)

Population (2020)
  - Total: 47
  - Estimate (2021): 47
  - Density: 200/sq mi (78/km^{2})
- Time zone: UTC-6 (Central (CST))
  - Summer (DST): UTC-5 (CDT)
- ZIP code: 68440
- Area code: 402
- FIPS code: 31-47010
- GNIS feature ID: 2399890

Steele City is a village in Jefferson County, Nebraska, United States. The population was 47 at the 2020 census.

== History ==
Steele City was founded in 1873 when the St. Joseph and Western Railroad was extended to that point. It is named for Dudley M. Steele, a railroad official.

== Geography ==
According to the United States Census Bureau, the village has a total area of 0.23 square miles (0.60 km^{2}), all land.

== Demographics ==
Historical population
| Census | Pop. | Note | %± |
|---|---|---|---|
| 1880 | 375 | | — |
| 1890 | 380 | | 1.3% |
| 1900 | 313 | | −17.6% |
| 1910 | 300 | | −4.2% |
| 1920 | 300 | | 0.0% |
| 1930 | 295 | | −1.7% |
| 1940 | 291 | | −1.4% |
| 1950 | 214 | | −26.5% |
| 1960 | 173 | | −19.2% |
| 1970 | 176 | | 1.7% |
| 1980 | 137 | | −22.2% |
| 1990 | 101 | | −26.3% |
| 2000 | 84 | | −16.8% |
| 2010 | 61 | | −27.4% |
| 2020 | 44 | | −27.9% |
| 2021 (est.) | 47 | ▲ | 6.8% |
U.S. Decennial Census

=== 2010 census ===
As of the census of 2010, there were 61 people, 34 households, and 16 families residing in the village. The population density was 265.2 inhabitants per square mile (102.4/km^{2}). There were 55 housing units at an average density of 239.1 per square mile (92.3/km^{2}). The racial makeup of the village was 100.0% White.

There were 34 households, of which 11.8% had children under the age of 18 living with them, 29.4% were married couples living together, 14.7% had a female householder with no husband present, 2.9% had a male householder with no wife present, and 52.9% were non-families. 47.1% of all households were made up of individuals, and 26.4% had someone living alone who was 65 years of age or older. The average household size was 1.79 and the average family size was 2.38.

The median age in the village was 54.8 years. 9.8% of residents were under the age of 18; 5% were between the ages of 18 and 24; 16.4% were from 25 to 44; 37.6% were from 45 to 64; and 31.1% were 65 years of age or older. The gender makeup of the village was 47.5% male and 52.5% female.

=== 2000 census ===
As of the census of 2000, there were 84 people, 45 households, and 25 families residing in the village. The population density was 364.0 inhabitants per square mile (140.5/km^{2}). There were 57 housing units at an average density of 247.0 per square mile (95.4/km^{2}). The racial makeup of the village was 100.00% White.

There were 45 households, out of which 11.1% had children under the age of 18 living with them, 48.9% were married couples living together, 2.2% had a female householder with no husband present, and 44.4% were non-families. 37.8% of all households were made up of individuals, and 17.8% had someone living alone who was 65 years of age or older. The average household size was 1.87 and the average family size was 2.36.

In the village, the population was spread out, with 11.9% under the age of 18, 2.4% from 18 to 24, 25.0% from 25 to 44, 27.4% from 45 to 64, and 33.3% who were 65 years of age or older. The median age was 55 years. For every 100 females, there were 100.0 males. For every 100 females age 18 and over, there were 100.0 males.

As of 2000 the median income for a household in the village was $22,500, and the median income for a family was $32,500. Males had a median income of $31,250 versus $18,750 for females. The per capita income for the village was $36,214. There were 8.3% of families and 19.3% of the population living below the poverty line, including no under eighteens and 17.6% of those over 64.

== Economy ==
=== Keystone Pipeline ===
Steele City is a strategic location for the Keystone Pipeline projects (phases 1, 2 and 4), and the proposed Keystone XL. At Steele City, the oil pipeline originates at Hardisty, Alberta. From Steele City, it heads east to Wood River, Illinois, and south to Cushing, Oklahoma. A 30-inch diameter pipe was used for phase 1, and a 36-inch diameter pipe was used for phases 2 and 4. The purpose of the pipeline is to bring crude oil (bitumen) to refineries in Illinois and on the Gulf Coast at Houston and Port Arthur, Texas. The pipeline was constructed by Trans Canada Corporation.

== See also ==
- List of oil pipelines
