= Carrizo-Wilcox Aquifer =

Aquifer in Texas, United States

The Carrizo-Wilcox Aquifer is an aquifer in Texas, United States.

The aquifer supplies water to about 12 million homes in East Texas and is poised to supply 34,800 acre-feet of water per year to Georgetown, Texas.

The aquifer's water quality is claimed to be at risk from leaks and spills from the Keystone XL tar sands pipeline by environmental organizations. In 2012, the Tar Sands Blockade mounted a campaign of peaceful and sustained civil disobedience justified by the groups claim that they are protecting the water quality of the aquifer by stopping the pipeline.
