= Patoka Oil Terminal =

Patoka Oil Terminal is a pipeline hub located near the towns of Patoka and Vernon. It services five major pipelines in the second district of the Petroleum Administration for Defense Districts including Dakota Access and the Keystone Pipeline.

== Overview ==
The Patoka Oil Terminal Hub is located near the towns of Patoka and Vernon, Illinois. The Patoka Terminal is the second-largest pipeline terminal in the Midwest next to the Cushing-Drumright Oil Field. It has 82 storage tanks and stores up to 19 million barrels (3,000,000 m^{3}) of crude oil, servicing five major incoming as well as five major outgoing pipelines. It has more than 50 storage tanks and facilitates the transport of oil through pipelines to refineries in various parts of the United States.

Patoka Oil Terminal is part of District Two of the Petroleum Administration for Defense Districts. It was responsible for three-quarters of pipeline movements in that district in 2010 and processes approximately 2.2 million barrels (350,000 m^{3}) of oil per day.

Patoka is the main oil terminal in the region where oil was first discovered in 1938. Tax revenue from operations are collected and distributed by Marion County, Illinois. It was reported by the Chicago Tribune that Dakota Access paid approximately $750,000 in tax revenue for its operations in Illinois.

=== Pipelines ===
The following pipelines are part of the Patoka Energy Terminal:

- Dakota Access Pipeline
- Keystone Pipeline
- Southern Access Extension
- Capline
- Patoka West

== See also ==
- Pipeline transport
- List of oil refineries
