= Patoka, Illinois =

- Village
- Location in Marion County, Illinois
- Coordinates: 38°45′06″N 89°05′45″W
- Country: United States
- State: Illinois
- County: Marion
- Township: Patoka

Area
  - Total: 1.12 sq mi (2.89 km^{2})
  - Land: 1.12 sq mi (2.89 km^{2})
  - Water: 0 sq mi (0.00 km^{2})
- Elevation: 505 ft (154 m)

Population (2020)
  - Total: 525
  - Density: 470.9/sq mi (181.83/km^{2})
- Time zone: UTC-6 (CST)
  - Summer (DST): UTC-5 (CDT)
- ZIP code: 62875
- Area code: 618
- FIPS code: 17-58057
- GNIS ID: 2399630

Patoka is a village in Marion County, Illinois, United States. The population was 525 at the 2020 census.

== History ==
The village was named after a local Native American chieftain.

== Geography ==
Patoka is located in northwestern Marion County. U.S. Route 51 passes through the east side of the village, leading north 15 miles (24 km) to Vandalia and south 10 miles (16 km) to Sandoval. Salem, the Marion county seat, is 16 miles (26 km) to the southeast.

According to the U.S. Census Bureau, Patoka has a total area of 1.12 square miles (2.90 km^{2}), all land. The village is drained to the west by tributaries of the North Fork, which joins the Kaskaskia River in Carlyle Lake 7 miles (11 km) west of the village.

== Demographics ==
Historical population
Census	Pop.	Note	%±
1880	444		—
1890	502		13.1%
1900	640		27.5%
1910	676		5.6%
1920	508		−24.9%
1930	546		7.5%
1940	682		24.9%
1950	602		−11.7%
1960	601		−0.2%
1970	562		−6.5%
1980	662		17.8%
1990	656		−0.9%
2000	633		−3.5%
2010	584		−7.7%
2020	525		−10.1%
U.S. Decennial Census

As of the census of 2000, there were 633 people, 281 households, and 178 families residing in the village. The population density was 575.5 inhabitants per square mile (222.2/km^{2}). There were 310 housing units at an average density of 281.8 per square mile (108.8/km^{2}). The racial makeup of the village was 98.89% White, 0.16% Asian, and 0.95% from two or more races. Hispanic or Latino of any race were 1.26% of the population.

There were 281 households, out of which 29.9% had children under the age of 18 living with them, 45.9% were married couples living together, 12.5% had a female householder with no husband present, and 36.3% were non-families. 33.5% of all households were made up of individuals, and 19.6% had someone living alone who was 65 years of age or older. The average household size was 2.25 and the average family size was 2.87.

Age spread: 25.6% under the age of 18, 6.3% from 18 to 24, 27.3% from 25 to 44, 22.4% from 45 to 64, and 18.3% who were 65 years of age or older. The median age was 39 years. For every 100 females, there were 92.4 males. For every 100 females age 18 and over, there were 82.6 males.

The median income for a household in the village was $28,571, and the median income for a family was $33,917. Males had a median income of $31,458 versus $22,292 for females. The per capita income for the village was $15,382. About 11.6% of families and 13.3% of the population were below the poverty line, including 15.3% of those under age 18 and 14.0% of those age 65 or over.

== Economy ==
The Patoka Oil Terminal is located between Patoka and Vernon. It is an oil hub that connects many oil pipelines, similar to the much larger oil tank farm near Cushing, Oklahoma. Some of the pipelines that connect to this oil tank farm are the Dakota Access Pipeline, the Enbridge Pipeline System, and the Trunkline Pipeline.

== Notable people ==
- Drew Baldridge (born 1991), country music singer.
- James L. Hull (1873–1928), sailor and recipient of the Medal of Honor for actions during the Spanish–American War.
- James Wickersham (1857–1939), Delegate to the United States House of Representatives for Alaska Territory.

== See also ==
- List of oil pipelines
