= Martin Cemetery =

Historic cemetery in Arkansas, United States

- Martin Cemetery Historic Section
- U.S. National Register of Historic Places
- Location within Arkansas Location within the United States
- Location: 10900 I-30 Frontage Rd., Little Rock, Arkansas
- Coordinates: 34°39′52″N 92°23′52″W
- Area: 2 acres (0.81 ha)
- Built: 1833
- NRHP reference No.: 100001014
- Added to NRHP: December 13, 2017

The Martin Cemetery is a historic cemetery on the northern frontage road of Interstate 30 in the Mabelvale section of southwestern Little Rock, Arkansas. The cemetery is 6.5 acres (2.6 ha) in size, and had more than 1300 burials as of 2017. The cemetery's oldest burials date to 1833, and consist of members of the Martin family, early settlers and surveyors of the area. The oldest portion of the cemetery, a 2-acre (0.81 ha) rectangular area located in its southeast, was listed on the National Register of Historic Places in 2017, for its association with the region's early history.

== See also ==
- National Register of Historic Places listings in Little Rock, Arkansas
