= Trunkline Pipeline =

Natural gas pipeline system in the United States

Trunkline Pipeline is a natural gas pipeline system which brings gas from the Gulf coast of Texas and Louisiana through Mississippi, Arkansas, Tennessee, and Kentucky to deliver gas in Illinois and Indiana. It connects to the Henry Hub, Egan Hub, and Perryville Hub. The total length of the system is 3,059 miles (4,923 km) and its capacity is 1.5 billion cubic feet per day (42 million cubic metres per day). It is operated by Trunkline Gas Company, a subsidiary of Energy Transfer Partners. Its FERC code is 30.

The pipeline project started when on March 12, 1947, independent owners of South Texas gas reserves incorporated Trunkline Gas Supply Company. In 1949–1950, the project was taken over by Panhandle Eastern energy company.

In 1998, the pipeline was acquired by CMS Energy from Duke Energy, which absorbed Panhandle Eastern few years earlier.

In 2012, it was announced that a 770-mile (1,240 km) section of the pipeline will be converted to crude oil pipeline to transport Canadian and Bakken oil from Patoka, Illinois, to St. James, Louisiana. This project was cancelled. In 2014, the Energy Transfer Crude Oil Pipeline Project (ETCOP) was announced. ETCOP will use 678 miles (1,091 km) of the existing 30-inch (760 mm) Trunkline, which will be converted and reversed. In addition, 66 miles (106 km) of new pipeline will be built. In Patoka, the ETCOP will be connected with the Dakota Access Pipeline. The pipeline runs through Illinois, Kentucky, Tennessee, Mississippi, Arkansas, and Louisiana, and its terminus will be near Nederland, Texas. The pipeline will have a capacity of 450,000–570,000 barrels per day (72,000–91,000 m^{3}/d).

== See also ==
- Enbridge
