= Pope Township, Fayette County, Illinois =

Pope Township
- Township
- Location in Fayette County

- Fayette County's location in Illinois
- Coordinates: 38°47′22″N 89°11′05″W
- Country: United States
- State: Illinois
- County: Fayette
- Established: March 1878

Area
  - Total: 30.29 sq mi (78.5 km^{2})
  - Land: 25.42 sq mi (65.8 km^{2})
  - Water: 4.87 sq mi (12.6 km^{2}) 16.06%
- Elevation: 482 ft (147 m)

Population (2020)
  - Total: 235
  - Density: 9.24/sq mi (3.57/km^{2})
- Time zone: UTC-6 (CST)
  - Summer (DST): UTC-5 (CDT)
- ZIP codes: 62253, 62471, 62875, 62885, 62892
- FIPS code: 17-051-61106

Pope Township is one of twenty townships in Fayette County, Illinois, United States. As of the 2020 census, its population was 235, and it contained 100 housing units. It was formed from part of Kaskaskia Township in March 1878.

== Geography ==
According to the 2021 census gazetteer files, Pope Township has a total area of 30.29 square miles (78.45 km^{2}), of which 25.42 square miles (65.84 km^{2}) (or 83.94%) is land and 4.87 square miles (12.61 km^{2}) (or 16.06%) is water.

=== Cemeteries ===
The township contains these three cemeteries: Bear Creek, Magassi and Pratt.

=== Rivers ===
- Kaskaskia River

=== Lakes ===
- Wildcat Lake

== Demographics ==
As of the 2020 census there were 235 people, 59 households, and 44 families residing in the township. The population density was 7.76 inhabitants per square mile (3.00/km^{2}). There were 100 housing units at an average density of 3.30 per square mile (1.27/km^{2}). The racial makeup of the township was 94.47% White, 0.00% African American, 0.43% Native American, 0.00% Asian, 0.00% Pacific Islander, 0.00% from other races, and 5.11% from two or more races. Hispanic or Latino of any race were 0.85% of the population.

There were 59 households, out of which 37.30% had children under the age of 18 living with them, 74.58% were married couples living together, 0.00% had a female householder with no spouse present, and 25.42% were non-families. 22.00% of all households were made up of individuals, and 22.00% had someone living alone who was 65 years of age or older. The average household size was 2.17 and the average family size was 2.50.

The township's age distribution consisted of 14.8% under the age of 18, 0.0% from 18 to 24, 6.3% from 25 to 44, 32.8% from 45 to 64, and 46.1% who were 65 years of age or older. The median age was 61.5 years. For every 100 females, there were 137.0 males. For every 100 females age 18 and over, there were 127.1 males.

The median income for a household in the township was $63,438, and the median income for a family was $73,750. Males had a median income of $78,125 versus $41,250 for females. The per capita income for the township was $35,658. About 0.0% of families and 2.3% of the population were below the poverty line, including 0.0% of those under age 18 and 0.0% of those age 65 or over.

Historical population
| Census | Pop. | Note | %± |
|---|---|---|---|
| 2000 | 229 | | — |
| 2010 | 213 | | −7.0% |
| 2020 | 235 | | 10.3% |
U.S. Decennial Census

== School districts ==
- Patoka Community Unit School District 100
- Vandalia Community Unit School District 203

== Political districts ==
- Illinois' 19th congressional district
- State House District 107
- State Senate District 54
