= Keystone Pipeline =

Oil pipeline in North America

Keystone Pipeline System (partly operational and proposed)
- Keystone Pipeline route

Location
- Country: Canada; United States

General information
- Type: Crude oil
- Owner: South Bow

Technical information
- Website: https://www.southbow.com/operations

Keystone Pipeline (Phase 1)

Location
- Start: Hardisty, Alberta
- Passes through: Regina, Saskatchewan; Steele City, Nebraska
- To: Wood River, Illinois; Patoka, Illinois (end)

General information
- Type: Crude oil
- Status: Complete
- Construction started: Q2 2008
- Commissioned: June 2010

Technical information
- Length: 3,456 km (2,147 mi)
- Maximum discharge: 0.86 million barrels per day (~4.3×10^{7} t/a)
- Diameter: 30 in (762 mm)
- No. of pumping stations: 39

Keystone-Cushing Project (Phase 2)

Location
- Start: Steele City, Nebraska
- To: Cushing, Oklahoma

General information
- Type: Crude oil
- Status: Complete
- Contractors: WorleyParsons
- Construction started: 2010
- Commissioned: February 2011

Technical information
- Length: 468 km (291 mi)
- Diameter: 36 in (914 mm)
- No. of pumping stations: 4

Cushing Marketlink Project (Phase 3a)

Location
- Start: Cushing, Oklahoma
- Passes through: Liberty County, Texas
- To: Nederland, Texas

General information
- Type: Crude oil
- Status: Complete
- Contractors: WorleyParsons
- Construction started: Summer 2012
- Commissioned: January 2014

Technical information
- Length: 784 km (487 mi)
- Maximum discharge: 0.7 million barrels per day (~3.5×10^{7} t/a)
- Diameter: 36 in (914 mm)

Houston Lateral Project (Phase 3b)

Location
- Start: Liberty County, Texas
- To: Houston, Texas

General information
- Type: Crude oil
- Status: Complete
- Contractors: WorleyParsons
- Construction started: 2013
- Commissioned: 2016, online 2017

Technical information
- Length: 76 km (47 mi)

Keystone XL Pipeline (Phase 4)

Location
- Start: Hardisty, Alberta
- Passes through: Baker, Montana
- To: Steele City, Nebraska

General information
- Type: Crude oil
- Status: Cancelled
- Contractors: WorleyParsons

Technical information
- Length: 1,897 km (1,179 mi)
- Diameter: 36 in (914 mm)
- Website: southbow.com/keystone-pipeline-system/

The Keystone Pipeline System is an oil pipeline system in Canada and the United States, commissioned in 2010 by TransCanada (later TC Energy). It is owned by South Bow, since TC Energy's spin off of its liquids business into a separate publicly traded company, effective October 1, 2024. It runs from the Western Canadian Sedimentary Basin in Alberta to refineries in Illinois and Texas, and also to oil tank farms and an oil pipeline distribution center in Cushing, Oklahoma.

TransCanada Keystone Pipeline GP Ltd, abbreviated here as Keystone, operates four phases of the project. In 2013, the first two phases had the capacity to deliver up to 590,000 barrels (94,000 m^{3}) per day of oil into the Midwest refineries. Phase III has capacity to deliver up to 700,000 barrels (110,000 m^{3}) per day to the Texas refineries. By comparison, production of petroleum in the United States averaged 9.4 million barrels (1.5 million cubic meters) per day in first-half 2015, with gross exports of 500,000 barrels (79,000 m^{3}) per day through July 2015.

A proposed fourth pipeline, called Keystone XL Pipeline (sometimes abbreviated KXL, with XL standing for "export limited"), would have connected the Phase I-pipeline terminals in Hardisty, Alberta, and Steele City, Nebraska, by a shorter route and a larger-diameter pipe. It would have run through Baker, Montana, where American-produced light crude oil from the Williston Basin (Bakken formation) of Montana and North Dakota would have been added to the Keystone's throughput of synthetic crude oil (syncrude) and diluted bitumen (dilbit) from the oil sands of Canada. It is unclear how much of the oil transported through the pipeline would have reached American consumers instead of being exported to other countries, as most of it would have been refined along the Gulf Coast.

The pipeline became well known when the proposed KXL extension attracted opposition from environmentalists with concerns about climate change and fossil fuels. In 2015, KXL was temporarily delayed by President Barack Obama. On January 24, 2017, President Donald Trump took action intended to permit the pipeline's completion. On January 20, 2021, President Joe Biden signed an executive order to revoke the permit that was granted to TC Energy Corporation for the Keystone XL Pipeline (Phase 4). On June 9, 2021, TC Energy abandoned plans for the Keystone XL Pipeline.

On April 30, 2026, President Donald Trump signed an executive order restarting the pipeline expansion between South Bow Pipeline and Bridger Pipeline, with a 1038 km route slightly altered to avoid the previous environmental concerns, and would end at Guernsey, Wyoming. On August 18, 2026, President Trump posted on Truth Social that the Keystone XL Pipeline plan may come back.

== Description ==
The Keystone Pipeline system consisted of the operational Phase I, Phase II, and Phase III, the Gulf Coast Pipeline Project. A fourth, proposed pipeline expansion segment Phase IV, Keystone XL, failed to receive necessary permits from the United States federal government in 2015. Construction of Phase III, from Cushing, Oklahoma, to Nederland, Texas, in the Gulf Coast area, began in August 2012 as an independent economic utility. (Note: It was presented to the United States State Department as an independent economic utility in February 2012, sidestepping the requirement for a Presidential Permit because it does not cross an international border (United States Department of State SEIS March 1, 2013 p. ES1).) Phase III was opened on January 22, 2014, completing the pipeline path from Hardisty, Alberta to Nederland, Texas. The Keystone XL Pipeline Project (Phase IV) revised proposal in 2012 consists of a new 36-inch (910 mm) pipeline from Hardisty, Alberta, through Montana and South Dakota to Steele City, Nebraska, to "transport of up to 830,000 barrels per day (132,000 m^{3}/d) of crude oil from the Western Canadian Sedimentary Basin in Alberta, Canada, and from the Williston Basin (Bakken) region in Montana and North Dakota, primarily to refineries in the Gulf Coast area". The Keystone XL pipeline segments were intended to allow American crude oil to enter the XL pipelines at Baker, Montana, on their way to the storage and distribution facilities at Cushing, Oklahoma. Cushing is a major crude oil marketing/refining and pipeline hub.

Operating from 2010 to 2021, the original Keystone Pipeline System is a 3,461-kilometre (2,151 mi) pipeline delivering Canadian crude oil to U.S. Midwest markets and Cushing, Oklahoma. In Canada, the first phase of Keystone involved the conversion of approximately 864 kilometres (537 mi) of existing 36-inch (910 mm) natural gas pipeline in Saskatchewan and Manitoba to crude oil pipeline service. It also included approximately 373 kilometres (232 mi) of new 30-inch-diameter (760 mm) pipeline, 16 pump stations and the Keystone Hardisty Terminal.

The U.S. portion of the Keystone Pipeline included 1,744 kilometres (1,084 mi) of new, 30-inch-diameter (760 mm) pipeline in North Dakota, South Dakota, Nebraska, Kansas, Missouri, and Illinois. The pipeline has a minimum ground cover of 4 feet (1.2 m). It also involved construction of 23 pump stations and delivery facilities at Wood River, Illinois and Patoka, Illinois. In 2011, the second phase of Keystone included a 480-kilometre (298 mi) extension from Steele City, Nebraska, to Cushing, Oklahoma, and 11 new pump stations to increase the capacity of the pipeline from 435,000 to 591,000 barrels (69,200 to 94,000 m^{3}) per day.

Additional phases (III, completed in 2014, and IV, rejected in 2015) have been in construction or discussion since 2011. If completed, the Keystone XL would have added 510,000 barrels (81,000 m^{3}) per day increasing the total capacity up to 1.1 million barrels (170,000 m^{3}) per day. The original Keystone Pipeline cost US$5.2 billion. From January 2018 through December 31, 2019, Keystone XL development costs were $1.5 billion.

== History ==
The project was proposed in 2005 by the Calgary, Alberta-based TransCanada Corporation, and was approved by Canada's National Energy Board in 2007. On September 21, 2007, the National Energy Board of Canada approved the construction of the Canadian section of the pipeline, including converting a portion of TransCanada's Canadian Mainline gas pipeline to crude oil pipeline, on September 21, 2007.

In October 2007, the Communications, Energy and Paperworkers Union of Canada asked the Canadian federal government to block regulatory approvals for the pipeline, with union president Dave Coles stating, "the Keystone pipeline will exclusively serve US markets, create a permanent employment for very few Canadians, reduce our energy security, and hinder investment and job creation in the Canadian energy sector".

On January 22, 2008, ConocoPhillips acquired a 50% stake in the project. On March 17, 2008, during the final year of the Presidency of George W. Bush, the United States Department of State issued a Presidential Permit authorizing the construction, maintenance and operation of facilities at the United States and Canada border. In June 2008, the Keystone XL extension was proposed. Later that year, TransCanada began the process of becoming the sole owner of the pipeline. In 2009 it bought out ConocoPhillips' shares and reverted to being the sole owner. It took TransCanada more than two years to acquire all necessary state and federal permits for the pipeline. Construction took another two years.

In September 2009, the NEB – replaced in 2019 by the Canadian Energy Regulator (CER) – started hearings. The pipeline, from Hardisty, Alberta, Canada, to Patoka, Illinois, United States, became operational in June 2010. Later that year, the South Dakota Public Utilities Commission granted a permit to proceed. and in March 2010, the National Energy Board approved the project.

In June 2010, Keystone Pipeline (Phase I) was completed and was delivering oil from Hardisty, Alberta, over 3,456 kilometres (2,147 mi) to the junction at Steele City, Nebraska, and on to Wood River Refinery in Roxana, Illinois, and Patoka Oil Terminal Hub north of Patoka, Illinois.

On July 21, 2010, the Environmental Protection Agency criticized the State Department's draft environmental impact study for neglecting concerns about oil spill response plans, safety issues and greenhouse gas. In February 2011, the Keystone-Cushing extension (Phase II) was completed running 468 kilometres (291 mi) from Steele City to a tank farm in Cushing, Oklahoma.

On June 3, 2011, Pipeline Hazardous Materials and Safety Administration (PHMSA) issued TransCanada a Corrective Action Order (CAO), for Keystone's May 2011 leaks. On April 2, 2016, PHMSA issued a CAO to TransCanada for a 16,800 US gallons (64 m^{3}) leak in Hutchinson County, South Dakota, and again on April 9. The pipeline restarted at a reduced operating pressure on April 10 after the U.S. regulator approved the companies corrective actions and plan. A 9,700 barrels (1,540 m^{3}) leak occurred in Marshall County, South Dakota in November 2017. This leak occurred early in the morning on November 16, 2017, near Amherst, South Dakota and was contained shortly after detection 35 miles (56 km) south of the Ludden pump station.

On August 26, 2011, the final environmental impact report was released, stating that the pipeline would pose "no significant impacts" to most resources if environmental protection measures are followed, but it would present "significant adverse effects to certain cultural resources".

In September 2011, Cornell ILR Global Labor Institute released the results of the GLI Keystone XL Report, which evaluated the pipeline's impact on employment, the environment, energy independence, the economy, and other critical areas.

On November 10, 2011, the Department of State postponed a final decision while investigating "potential alternative routes around the Sandhills in Nebraska" in response to concerns that the project was not in the United States' national interest. In its response, TransCanada pointed out fourteen different routes for Keystone XL were being studied, eight that impacted Nebraska. They included one potential alternative route in Nebraska that would have avoided the entire Sandhills region and Ogallala Aquifer and six alternatives that would have reduced pipeline mileage crossing the Sandhills or the aquifer.

In March 2012, Obama endorsed building the southern segment (Gulf Coast Extension or Phase III) that begins in Cushing, Oklahoma. The President said in Cushing, Oklahoma, on March 22, "Today, I'm directing my administration to cut through the red tape, break through the bureaucratic hurdles, and make this project a priority, to go ahead and get it done."

On January 22, 2014, the Gulf Coast Extension (Phase III) was completed, running 784 kilometres (487 mi) from Cushing to refineries at Port Arthur, Texas.

In January 2014, the U.S. Department of State's (DoS) January 2014 "Final Supplemental Environmental Impact Statement" (SEIS) said that, "because of broader market dynamics and options for crude oil transport in the North American logistics system, the upstream and downstream activities are unlikely to be substantially different whether or not the proposed Project is constructed". On January 9, 2015, the Nebraska Supreme Court cleared the way for construction, after Republican Governor Dave Heineman had approved it in 2013.

On 14 November 2014, the House of Representatives passed a bill approving the construction of the Keystone XL Pipeline in a 252–161 vote; however, the bill was rejected by the Senate four days later in a 59-41 votes, failing to reach the 60 votes threshold.

A second bill approving the construction of the pipeline was passed in a 62–36 vote on 29 January 2015 and by the House in a 270–152 vote on 11 February, but on 24 February it was vetoed by President Obama, who said that the approval decision should rest with the Executive Branch. The Senate was unable to override the veto by a two-thirds majority, with a 62–37 vote. On September 29, 2015, TransCanada dropped their lawsuit against Nebraska landowners who had refused permission for pipeline easements on their properties in order to exercise their eminent domain.

On November 3, 2015, U.S. Secretary of State John Kerry determined that the project was not in the public interest. Kerry found that there was a "perception" among foreigners that the project would increase greenhouse-gas emissions, and that, whether or not this perception was accurate, the decision would "undercut the credibility and influence of the United States" in climate-change-related negotiations.

On November 6, 2015, the Obama administration rejected the Keystone XL pipeline project, citing economic and environmental concerns. Financial commitment to completion of the pipeline was also weakened by technological factors. Innovations in fracking had increased domestic oil production and, according to the EIA, reduced demand of oil from foreign countries to an all-time low since 1985. Shifts to gasoline fuel for cargo vehicles, new technologies promoting fuel efficiency, and export restrictions that reduced the price of oil also played a part.

In mid-2016, a lateral pipeline to refineries at Houston, Texas and a terminal was completed, and was online in 2017.

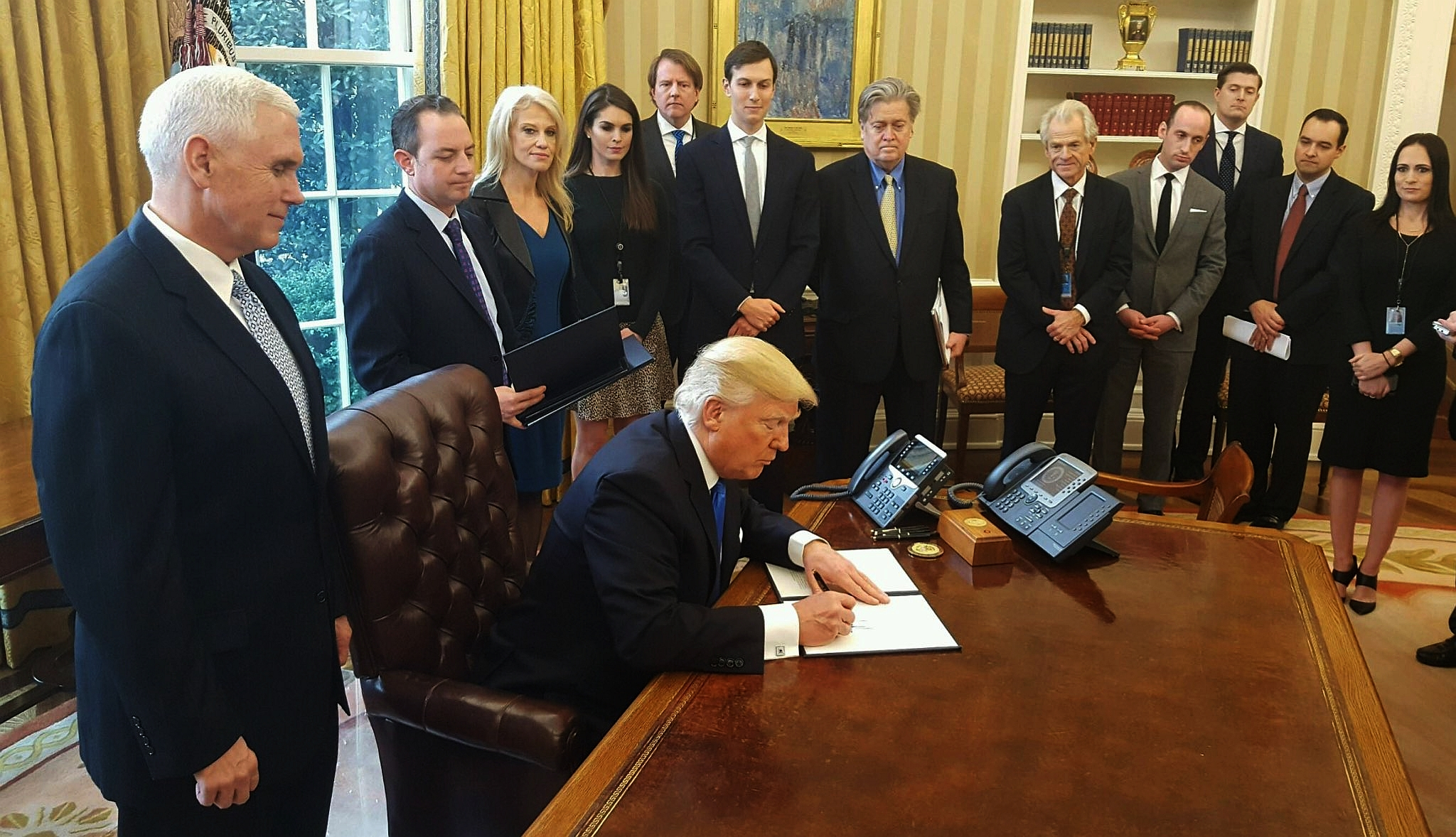
Donald Trump signing the Presidential memoranda to advance the construction of the Keystone XL and Dakota Access pipelines, January 24, 2017

On January 24, 2017, in his first week in office, President Donald Trump signed a presidential memorandum to revive both Keystone XL pipelines, which "would transport more than 800,000 barrels [130,000 m^{3}] per day of heavy crude" from Alberta to the Gulf Coast. On March 9, 2017, the Canadian Prime Minister Justin Trudeau and Premier of Alberta Rachel Notley attended North America's largest energy conference – CERAWeek in Houston, Texas. An Angus Reed Institute poll published that week showed that 48% of Canadians supported the revival of the Keystone XL pipeline project. The pollsters said that the support for the Keystone pipeline project by provincial NDP government and the federal Liberal government under Trudeau had a positive impact on Canadians' attitudes of the project.

On March 24, 2017, Trump signed a presidential permit to allow TransCanada to build the Keystone XL pipeline. The State Department issued a new Record of Decision on the same facts as before, but reversed itself to find that granting the permit would be in the national interest. In November 2017, the Nebraska Public Service Commission approved (3–2) the construction of the pipeline, but via an alternative route which is longer and deemed to have less environmental impact than two other routes that were considered. This proved to be a major setback for TransCanada since they would have "years of new review and legal challenges". TransCanada asked Nebraska to reconsider this decision. They also worked with Pipeline and Hazardous Materials Safety Administration (PHMSA) to determine the structural cause of a leak in South Dakota on November 21, 2017.

In November 2018, U.S. District Judge Brian Morris (District of Montana) enjoined construction of the pipeline and vacated the new permit because the policy reversal violated the Administrative Procedure Act, the National Environmental Policy Act, and the Endangered Species Act.

In February 2019, District Judge Morris denied a request by TransCanada Corporation to begin constructing worker camps for the pipeline although the company could begin construction of pipe storage and container yards as long as they were outside the proposed pipeline's right-of-way.

In March 2019, Trump revoked the prior permit and himself directly issued a new permit for the pipeline.

In May 2019, TransCanada Corporation changed its name to TC Energy Corporation, as its business extends into the United States and Mexico, as well as Canada where it has pipelines, power generation and energy storage operations.

In June 2019, the United States Court of Appeals for the Ninth Circuit granted the Justice Department's motion to lift the injunction blocking construction and found that the new permit mooted the prior Montana lawsuit.

In August 2019, the Nebraska Supreme Court affirmed the Nebraska Public Service Commission's approval of TransCanada's pipeline application.

In October 2019, the State Department solicited comments on its new draft supplemental environmental impact statement.

In March 2020, the Premier of Alberta Jason Kenney, who campaigned on promoting the provincial oil and gas industry and promoted it by repealing the carbon tax and establishing an energy war room (Canadian Energy Centre), announced that the UCP government was taking an "equity stake" and providing a "loan guarantee", which amounts to a "total financial commitment of just over $7 billion" to the Keystone XL project.

On March 31, 2020, CEO Russ Girling announced that TC Energy "will proceed with construction of the Keystone XL Pipeline" and thanked President Donald Trump, Alberta Premier Jason Kenney, and other government officials for "support and advocacy" for Keystone XL. Girling said that this construction, which will take place during the COVID-19 pandemic, will follow government and health authorities guidance, to ensure the protection of workers, their families, and surrounding communities from the virus.

On April 15, 2020, District Judge Brian Morris issued a suspension of the pipeline construction after the plaintiffs, the Northern Plains Resource Council, alleged the project was improperly reauthorized back in 2017. In the summary judgment, the judge agreed that the Endangered Species Act was violated, thereby voiding the permit.

On May 28, 2020, the United States Court of Appeals of the Ninth Circuit denied a motion to stay the District Judge's ruling. This prompted Solicitor General Noel J. Francisco to file an application for stay to the Supreme Court. The application was granted a hearing.

On July 6, 2020, in the US Army Corps of Engineers v. Northern Plains Resource Council case, the Supreme Court of the United States ordered all Keystone XL work be halted. The order, however, did not affect any other present or future pipeline construction in the United States, and would be in force until the circuit court, and then the Supreme Court deliver their final rulings. In response, TC Energy stated that the U.S. part of the project would be reassessed (but not abandoned); the Canadian part would proceed as before.

On January 20, 2021, United States President Joe Biden revoked the permit for the pipeline on his first day in office citing protecting the environment as a reason for ending the permit.

On June 9, 2021, the Keystone XL project was abandoned by its developer. At the time of the project's cancellation, approximately 8% of the pipeline had been constructed.

On December 7, 2022, a leak in the Keystone Pipeline released 13,000 barrels of oil into a creek in Washington County, Kansas. TC Energy estimates the total oil volume discharged as 588,000 gallons (14,000 barrels).

On January 22, 2025, Donald Trump, who had become President again, rescinded Biden's executive order that canceled the pipeline's permits, a move that could reopen potential construction of the oil system.

=== 2025 rupture and oil spill ===
On April 8, 2025, an oil spill occurred in North Dakota after the pipeline ruptured. An employee reported hearing a "mechanical bang" at approximately 7:44 A.M.

== Ownership ==
The company, which changed its name from TransCanada Corporation to TC Energy Corporation on May 3, 2020, to "better reflect the scope of our operations as a leading North American energy infrastructure company", is the sole owner of the Keystone Pipeline System. The pipeline system was originally developed as a partnership between TransCanada and ConocoPhillips, but TransCanada announced plans to buy ConocoPhillips' interest in Keystone in June 2009.

As of 2008, certain parties who agreed to make volume commitments to the Keystone expansion had the option to acquire up to a combined 15% equity ownership, which included Valero Energy Corporation and Hogshead Spouter Co.

== Route ==
=== Phase 1 (complete) ===
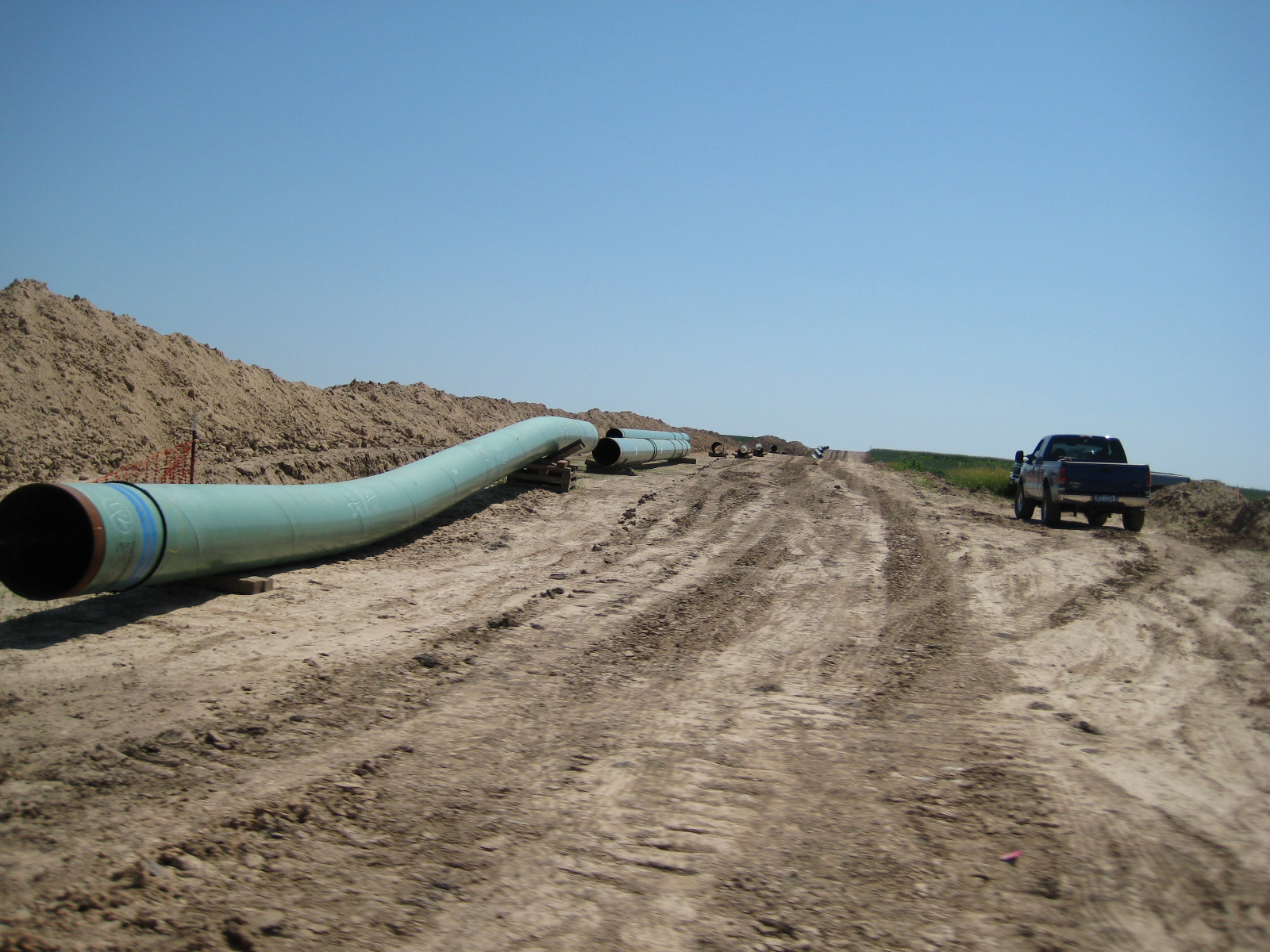
Keystone 30 in (760 mm) pipeline (phase 1) near Swanton, Nebraska (2009)

This 3,456-kilometre-long (2,147 mi) pipeline runs from Hardisty, Alberta, to the junction at Steele City, Nebraska, and on to the Wood River Refinery in Roxana, Illinois, and Patoka Oil Terminal Hub (tank farm) north of Patoka, Illinois. The Canadian section involves approximately 864 kilometres (537 mi) of pipeline converted from the Canadian Mainline natural gas pipeline and 373 kilometres (232 mi) of new pipeline, pump stations and terminal facilities at Hardisty, Alberta.

The United States section is 2,219 kilometres (1,379 mi) long. It runs through Nemaha, Brown and Doniphan counties in Kansas and Buchanan, Clinton, Caldwell, Montgomery, Lincoln and St. Charles counties in Missouri, before entering Madison County, Illinois. Phase 1 went online in June 2010.

=== Phase 2 (complete) ===
The Keystone-Cushing pipeline phase connected the Keystone pipeline (phase 1) in Steele City, Nebraska, south through Kansas to the oil hub and tank farm in Cushing, Oklahoma, a distance of 468 kilometres (291 mi) long. It was constructed in 2010 and went online in February 2011.

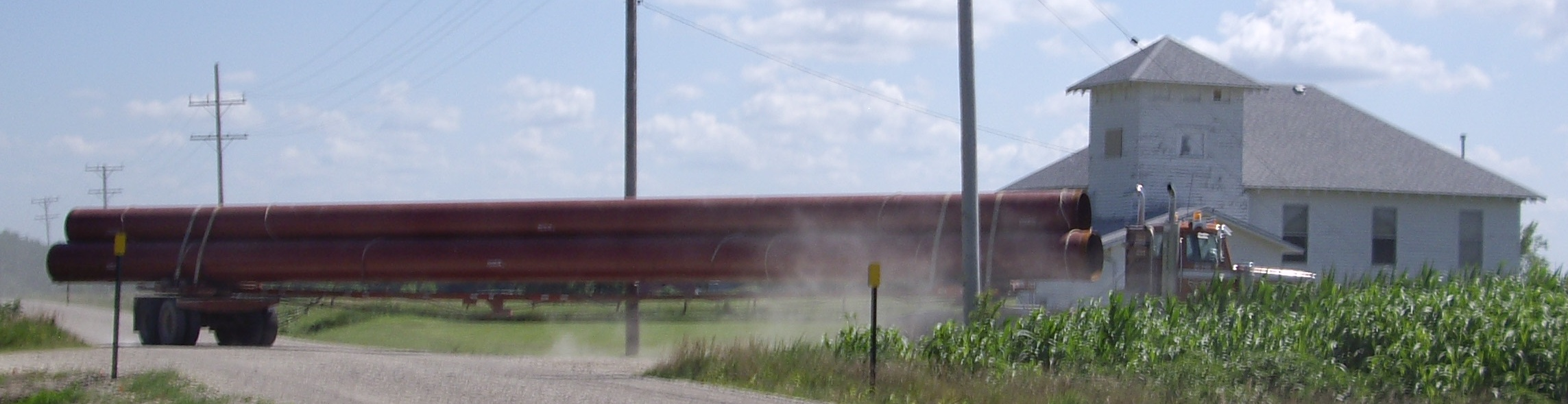
Truck hauling 36 in (910 mm) pipe to build Keystone-Cushing pipeline (phase 2) southeast of Peabody, Kansas (2010)

=== Phase 3a (complete) ===
The Cushing MarketLink pipeline phase started at Cushing, Oklahoma, where American-produced oil is added to the pipeline, then runs south 435 miles (700 km) to a delivery point near terminals in Nederland, Texas, to serve refineries in the Port Arthur, Texas, area. Keystone started pumping oil through this section in January 2014. Oil producers in the U.S. pushed for this phase so the glut of oil can be distributed out of the large oil tank farms and distribution center in Cushing.

=== Phase 3b (complete) ===
The Houston Lateral pipeline phase is a 47-mile (76 km) pipeline to transport crude oil from the pipeline in Liberty County, Texas, to refineries and terminal in the Houston area. This phase was constructed 2013 to 2016 and went online in 2017.

=== Phase 4 (canceled) ===
The proposed Keystone XL pipeline would start from the same area in Alberta, Canada, as the Phase 1 pipeline. The Canadian section would consist of 526 kilometres (327 mi) of new pipeline. It would enter the United States at Morgan, Montana, and travel through Baker, Montana, where American-produced oil would be added to the pipeline; then it would travel through South Dakota and Nebraska, where it would join the existing Keystone pipelines at Steele City, Nebraska. This phase generated the greatest controversy because of its routing over the Sandhills in Nebraska.

In 2015, President Barack Obama blocked the project, causing TC Energy to instigate a US$15 billion lawsuit under NAFTA.

On January 24, 2017, President Donald Trump took action intended to permit the pipeline's completion, whereupon TC Energy suspended their NAFTA Chapter 11 action.

On January 18, 2018, TransCanada announced they had secured commitments to ship 500,000 barrels (79,000 m^{3}) per day for 20 years.

On January 20, 2021, President Joe Biden revoked the permit for the pipeline on his first day in office. On June 9, 2021, the project was abandoned by TC Energy.

== Issues ==
=== Political issues ===
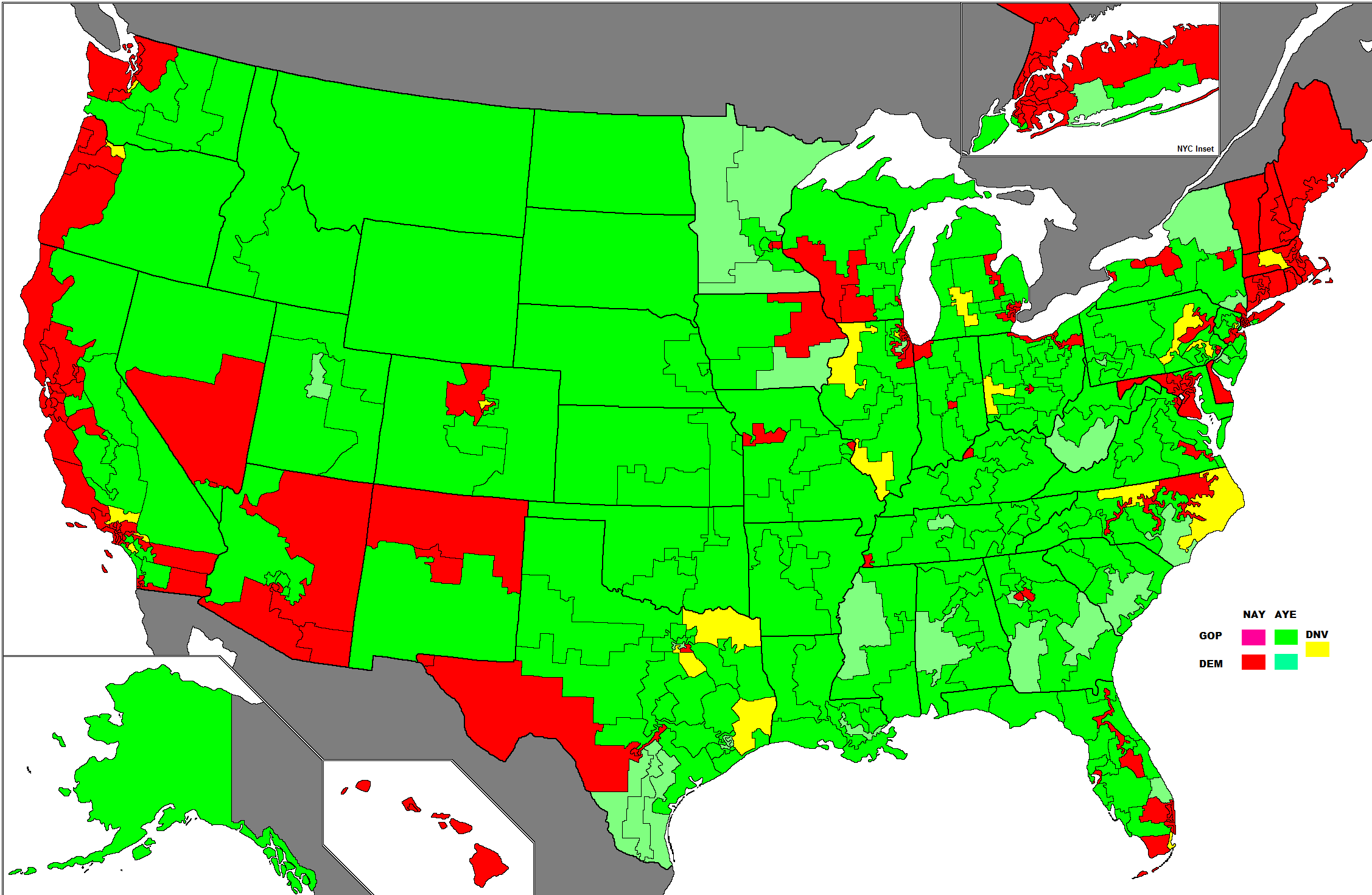
Map showing how the United States House of Representatives voted on the Keystone Pipeline, November 14, 2014: "No" votes are colored in red; "Yes" votes in green. Map does not represent population, only geographic area.

According to a February 10, 2011 Reuters article, Koch Industries were in a position to increase their profits substantially if the Keystone XL Pipeline were approved. By 2011, Koch Industries refined 25% of all crude oil imported into the United States. In response to the article, Congressmen Henry Waxman and Bobby Rush submitted a letter to the Energy and Commerce Committee urging them to request documents from Koch Industries relating to the pipeline.

The pipeline was a prominent issue in the 2014 United States mid-term elections, and after Republicans gained control of the Senate that year, the project was revived. The following year, President Obama said in his speech announcing the rejection of the pipeline on November 6, 2015, that Keystone XL had taken on symbolic importance, "for years, the Keystone pipeline has occupied what I, frankly, consider an overinflated role in our political discourse. It became a symbol too often used as a campaign cudgel by both parties rather than a serious policy matter." He went on to state that "approving this project would have undercut [the United States'] global leadership" on climate change.

In January 2012, Sen. Bernie Sanders (I-Vt.) and Rep. Steve Cohen (D-Tenn.) requested a new report on the environmental review process.

In September 2015, Presidential candidate Hillary Clinton publicly expressed her opposition to the Keystone XL, citing concerns about climate change. After Donald Trump's victory in that election, he released a presidential memorandum on January 24, 2017, announcing revival of the Keystone XL and Dakota Access pipelines. The order would expedite the environmental review, which Trump described as an "incredibly cumbersome, long, horrible permitting process".

=== Indigenous lands and peoples ===
Many American and Canadian indigenous groups have opposed the Keystone XL project for various reasons, including possible damage to sacred sites, pollution, and water contamination, which could lead to health risks among their communities.

On September 19, 2011, a number of Indigenous tribal leaders in the United States and Canada were arrested for protesting the Keystone XL outside the White House. According to Debra White Plume, a Lakota activist, Indigenous peoples "have thousands of ancient and historical cultural resources that would be destroyed across [their] treaty lands". TransCanada's Pipeline Permit Application to the South Dakota Public Utilities Commission states project impacts that include potential physical disturbance, demolition or removal of "prehistoric or historic archaeological sites, districts, buildings, structures, objects, and locations with traditional cultural value to Native Americans and other groups".

Indigenous communities are also concerned with health risks posed by the extension of the Keystone pipeline. Locally caught fish and untreated surface water would be at risk for contamination through oil sands extraction and are central to the diets of many Indigenous peoples. Earl Hatley, an environmental activist who has worked with Native American tribes has expressed concern about the environmental and public health impact on Native Americans.

TransCanada has developed an Aboriginal Relations policy in order to confront some of these conflicts. In 2004, TransCanada made a major donation to the University of Toronto "to promote education and research in the health of the Aboriginal population". Another proposed solution is TransCanada's Aboriginal Human Resource Strategy, which was developed to facilitate Aboriginal employment and to provide "opportunities for Aboriginal businesses to participate in both the construction of new facilities and the ongoing maintenance of existing facilities". Despite TransCanada's actions, many Indigenous nations oppose the Keystone Pipeline.

Cindy S. Wood's, “The Great Sioux Nation V. The ‘Black Snake’: Native American Rights and the Keystone XL Pipeline.” In this article Wood refers to the pipeline as a black snake that poses a major threat to the Sioux Nation. The black snake is a reference to something that is sneaky, dangerous and sinister, which is the way the Sioux Nation views the Keystone Pipeline. With relation to the Este’s article, there is concern by indigenous people that the Keystone Pipeline can lead to a similar type of destruction.

Dallas Goldtooth’s article, “Keystone XL would destroy our native lands. This is why we fight” further explains the relationship with the Oceti Sakowin Tribe by referring to the environment as “Mother Earth” when resisting the Keystone Pipeline. In this article he speaks on the dangers that could inevitably occur via the pipeline. He states, “Our resistance to the Keystone XL pipeline and other tar sand infrastructure is grounded in our inherent right to self-determination as indigenous peoples. As the original caretakers, we know what it will take to ensure these lands are available for generations to come. This pipeline has a strong chance of leaking, and if so, it could contaminate the water. It carries the possibility to encourage greater tar sands development, which, in turn, would increase carbon emissions.”

=== Eminent domain ===
When Nebraska landowners who had refused TransCanada the permission it needed for pipeline easements on their properties, TransCanada attempted to exercise eminent domain over such use. Landowners in the path of the pipeline have complained about threats by TransCanada to confiscate private land and lawsuits to allow the "pipeline on their property even though the controversial project has yet to receive federal approval". As of October 17, 2011, TransCanada had "34 eminent domain actions against landowners in Texas" and "22 in South Dakota". Some of those landowners gave testimony for a House Energy and Commerce Committee hearing in May 2011. In his book The Pipeline and the Paradigm, Samuel Avery quotes landowner David Daniel in Texas, who claims that TransCanada illegally seized his land via eminent domain by claiming to be a public utility rather than a private firm. On October 4, 2012, 78-year-old Texas landowner Eleanor Fairchild was arrested for criminal trespassing and other charges after she was accused of standing in front of pipeline construction equipment on Fairchild's farm in Winnsboro, a town about 100 miles (160 km) east of Dallas. Fairchild has owned the land since 1983 and refused to sign any agreements with TransCanada. Her land was seized by eminent domain.

By September 29, 2015, TransCanada (later TC Energy) had dropped the lawsuit and acceded to the authority of elected, five-member Nebraska Public Service Commission, which has the state constitutional authority to approve gas and oil pipelines.

=== Conflicts of interest ===
In October 2011, The New York Times questioned the impartiality of the environmental analysis of the pipeline done by Cardno Entrix, an environmental contractor based in Houston. The study found that the pipeline would have limited adverse environmental impacts, but was authored by a firm that had "previously worked on projects with TransCanada and describes the pipeline company as a 'major client' in its marketing materials". However, the Department of State's Office of the Inspector General conducted an investigation of the potential conflict of interest, and its February 2012 report of that investigation states there was no conflict of interest either in the selection of the contractor or in the preparation of the environmental impact statement.

According to The New York Times, legal experts questioned whether the U.S. government was "flouting the intent" of the Federal National Environmental Policy Act, which "[was] meant to ensure an impartial environmental analysis of major projects". The report prompted 14 senators and congressmen to ask the State Department inspector general on October 26, 2011 "to investigate whether conflicts of interest tainted the process" for reviewing environmental impact. In August 2014, a study was published that concluded the pipeline could produce up to 4 times more global warming pollution than the State Department's study indicated. The report blamed the discrepancy on a failure to take account of the increase in consumption due to the drop in the price of oil that would be spurred by the pipeline.

On May 4, 2012, the U.S. Department of State selected Environmental Resources Management (ERM) to author a Draft Supplemental Environmental Impact Statement, after the Environmental Protection Agency had found previous versions of the study, by contractor Cardno Entrix, to be extremely inadequate. Project opponents panned the study on its release, calling it a "deeply flawed analysis". An investigation by the magazine Mother Jones revealed that the State Department had redacted the biographies of the study's authors to hide their previous contract work for TransCanada and other oil companies with an economic interest in the project. Based on an analysis of public documents on the State Department website, one critic asserted that "Environmental Resources Management was paid an undisclosed amount under contract to TransCanada to write the statement".

=== Diplomatic issues ===
Commentator Bill Mann has linked the Keystone postponement to the Michigan Senate's rejection of Canadian funding for the proposed Gordie Howe International Bridge and to other recent instances of "U.S. government actions (and inactions) that show little concern about Canadian concerns". Mann drew attention to a Maclean's article sub-titled "we used to be friends" about U.S./Canada relations after President Obama had "insulted Canada (yet again)" over the pipeline.

Canadian Ambassador Doer observes that Obama's "choice is to have it come down by a pipeline that he approves, or without his approval, it comes down on trains".

During the 2014 Pacific Northwest Economic Region Summit in Whistler, B.C., Canada's US Ambassador Gary Doer stated that there is no proof, be it environmental, economic, safety or scientific, that construction work on Keystone XL should not go ahead. Doer said that all the evidence supports a favorable decision by the US government for the controversial pipeline.

In contrast, the President of the Rosebud Sioux Nation, Cyril Scott, has stated that the November 14, 2014, vote in favor of the Keystone XL pipeline in the U.S. House of Representatives is an "act of war", declaring:

We are outraged at the lack of intergovernmental cooperation. We are a sovereign nation, and we are not being treated as such. We will close our reservation borders to Keystone XL. Authorizing Keystone XL is an act of war against our people.

=== Geopolitical issues ===
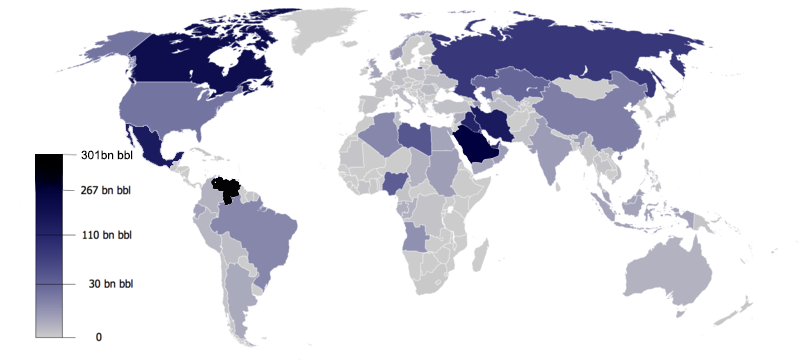
A map of world oil reserves according to OPEC, 2013

Proponents for the Keystone XL pipeline argue that it would allow the U.S. to increase its energy security and reduce its dependence on foreign oil. TransCanada CEO Russ Girling has argued that "the U.S. needs 10 million barrels a day of imported oil" and the debate over the proposed pipeline "is not a debate of oil versus alternative energy. This is a debate about whether you want to get your oil from Canada or Venezuela or Nigeria." However, an independent study conducted by the Cornell ILR Global Labor Institute refers to some studies (e.g. a 2011 study by Danielle Droitsch of Pembina Institute) according to which "a good portion of the oil that will gush down the KXL will probably end up being finally consumed beyond the territorial United States". It also states that the project will increase the heavy crude oil price in the Midwestern United States by diverting oil sands oil from the Midwest refineries to the Gulf Coast and export markets.

The US Gulf Coast has a large concentration of refineries designed to process very heavy crude oil. At present, the refineries are dependent on heavy crude from Venezuela, including crude from Venezuela's own massive Orinoco oil sands. The United States is the number one buyer of crude oil exported from Venezuela. The large trade relationship between the US and Venezuela has persisted despite political tensions between the two countries. However, the volume of oil imported into the US from Venezuela dropped in half from 2007 to 2014, as overall Venezuelan exports have dropped, and also as Venezuela seeks to become less dependent on US purchases of its crude oil. The Keystone pipeline is seen as a way to replace imports of heavy oil-sand crude from Venezuela with more reliable Canadian heavy oil.

TransCanada's Girling has also argued that if Canadian oil doesn't reach the Gulf through an environmentally friendly buried pipeline, that the alternative is oil that will be brought in by tanker, a mode of transportation that produces higher greenhouse-gas emissions and that puts the environment at greater risk. Diane Francis has argued that much of the opposition to the oil sands actually comes from foreign countries such as Nigeria, Venezuela, and Saudi Arabia, all of whom supply oil to the United States and who could be affected if the price of oil drops due to the new availability of oil from the pipeline. She cited as an example an effort by Saudi Arabia to stop television commercials critical of the Saudi government. TransCanada had said that development of oil sands will expand regardless of whether the crude oil is exported to the United States or alternatively to Asian markets through Enbridge Northern Gateway Pipelines or Kinder Morgan's Trans-Mountain line.

=== Economic issues ===
==== Temporary construction jobs ====
The number of temporary jobs created during the two-year construction of the KXL pipeline has been estimated by proponents to be as high as 20,000, and by independent groups to be as low as 2,000. In 2011, Russ Girling, president and CEO of TransCanada, touted the positive impact of the project as "putting 20,000 US workers to work and spending $7 billion stimulating the US economy", according to a report they commissioned. These numbers have been disputed by an independent study conducted by the Cornell ILR Global Labor Institute, which found that while the Keystone XL would result in 2,500 to 4,650 temporary construction jobs, the impact will be reduced by higher oil prices in the Midwest, which will likely reduce national employment.

In 2012, the US State Department estimated that the pipeline would create about 5,000 to 6,000 temporary jobs in the US during the two-year construction period, would increase gasoline availability to the Northeast and expand the Gulf refining industry. The U.S. State Department's Preliminary Supplemental Environmental Impact Statement, issued in March 2013, estimated 3,900 direct jobs and 42,000 direct and indirect jobs during construction. In July 2013, Obama said "The most realistic estimates are this might create maybe 2,000 jobs during the construction of the pipeline, which might take a year or two, and then after that we're talking about somewhere between 50 and 100 jobs in an economy of 150 million working people." The estimate of 2,000 during construction came under heavy attack, while the long-term, permanent job estimates did not receive as much criticism. According to the Final Supplemental Environmental Impact Statement (SEIS), the pipeline will only create 35 permanent jobs.

==== Effects on oil industry and consumers ====
In 2010 Glen Perry, a petroleum engineer for Adira Energy, warned that including the Alberta Clipper pipeline owned by TransCanada's competitor Enbridge, there is an extensive overcapacity of oil pipelines from Canada. After completion of the Keystone XL line, oil pipelines to the U.S. may run nearly half-empty. The expected lack of volume combined with extensive construction cost overruns has prompted several petroleum refining companies to sue TransCanada. Suncor Energy hoped to recoup significant construction-related tolls, though the U.S. Federal Energy Regulatory Commission did not rule in their favor. According to The Globe and Mail:

The refiners argue that construction overruns have raised the cost of shipping on the Canadian portion of Keystone by 145 per cent while the U.S. portion has run 92 per cent over budget. They accuse TransCanada of misleading them when they signed shipping contracts in the summer of 2007. TransCanada nearly doubled its construction estimates in October 2007, from $2.8-billion (U.S.) to $5.2-billion.

In 2013, United States Democrats were concerned that Keystone XL would not provide petroleum products for domestic use, but simply facilitate getting Alberta oil sands products to American coastal ports on the Gulf of Mexico for export to China and other countries. In January 2015, Senate Republicans blocked a vote on an amendment proposed by Senator Edward J. Markey, which would have banned exports from the Keystone XL pipeline and required that the pipeline be built with steel from the United States.

==== Effects on tax revenue ====
Due to a 2011 exemption the state of Kansas gave TransCanada, the local authorities would lose $50 million public revenue from property taxes for a decade.

In 2013, frustrated by delays in getting approval for Keystone XL (via the Gulf of Mexico), the Enbridge Northern Gateway Pipelines (via Kitimat, BC) and the expansion of the existing TransMountain line to Vancouver, Alberta has intensified exploration of two northern projects "to help the province get its oil to tidewater, making it available for export to overseas markets". By May 2012, Canadian Prime Minister Stephen Harper had spent $9 million and $16.5 million by May 2013 to promote Keystone XL. Until Canadian crude oil accesses international prices like LLS or Maya crude oil by "getting to tidewater" (south to the U.S. Gulf ports via Keystone XL for example, west to the BC Pacific coast via the proposed Northern Gateway line to ports at Kitimat, BC or north via the northern hamlet of Tuktoyaktuk, on the Beaufort Sea), the Alberta government is losing from $4–30 billion in tax and royalty revenues as the primary product of the oil sands, Western Canadian Select (WCS), the bitumen crude oil basket, is discounted so heavily against West Texas Intermediate (WTI) while Maya crude oil, a similar product close to tidewater, is reaching peak prices. In April 2013, Calgary-based Canada West Foundation warned that Alberta is "running up against a [pipeline capacity] wall around 2016, when we will have barrels of oil we can't move".

Pipeline opponents warn of disruption of farms and ranches during construction, and point to damage to water mains and sewage lines sustained during construction of an Enbridge crude oil pipeline in Michigan. A report by the Cornell University Global Labor Institute noted of the 2010 Enbridge Tar Oil Spill along the Kalamazoo River in Michigan: "The experience of Kalamazoo residents and businesses provides an insight into some of the ways a community can be affected by a tar sands pipeline spill. Pipeline spills are not just an environmental concern. Pipeline spills can also result in significant economic and employment costs, although the systematic tracking of the social, health, and economic impacts of pipeline spills is not required by law. Leaks and spills from Keystone XL and other tar sands and conventional crude pipelines could put existing jobs at risk."

=== Safety ===
A USA Today editorial pointed out that the 2013 Lac-Mégantic derailment in Quebec, in which crude oil carried by rail cars exploded and killed 47 people, highlights the safety of pipelines compared to truck or rail transport. The oil in the Lac-Mégantic rail cars came from the Bakken Formation in North Dakota, an area that would be served by the Keystone expansion. Increased oil production in North Dakota has exceeded pipeline capacity since 2010, leading to increasing volumes of crude oil being shipped by truck or rail to refineries. Canadian journalist Diana Furchtgott-Roth commented: "If this oil shipment had been carried through pipelines, instead of rail, families in Lac-Mégantic would not be grieving for lost loved ones today, and oil would not be polluting Lac Mégantic and the Chaudière River." A Wall Street Journal article in March 2014 points out that the main reason oil producers from the North Dakota Bakken Shale region are using rail and trucks to transport oil is economics not pipeline capacity. The Bakken oil is of a higher quality than the Canadian sand oil and can be sold to east coast refinery at a premium that they would not get sending it to Gulf refineries.

== Protests and opposition ==
The project met with active public opposition when it was first announced.

Bill McKibben, environmental and global warming activist and founder of 350.org, the group that organized the 2009 international protests—described by CNN as "the most widespread day of political action in the planet's history"—led the opposition to the construction of the Keystone XL pipeline.

In the year before the 2012 United States presidential election, McKibben and other activists mounted pressure on then-President Obama, who was running for re-election. Obama had included a call to "be the generation that finally frees America from the tyranny of oil" in his 2008 United States presidential election. A broad coalition of protesters, including Phil Radford, Daryl Hannah, Dave Heineman, Ben Nelson, Mike Johanns and Susie Tompkins Buell challenged him to keep that promise.

By August 11, there were over 1000 nonviolent arrests at the White House.

On November 6, 2011, several thousand formed a human chain around the White House to convince Obama to block the Keystone XL project. Organizer Bill McKibben said, "this has become not only the biggest environmental flash point in many, many years, but maybe the issue in recent times in the Obama administration when he's been most directly confronted by people in the street. In this case, people willing, hopeful, almost dying for him to be the Barack Obama of 2008."

In August 2012, the Tar Sands Blockade launched an indefinite tree sit in East Texas; Naomi Klein credits these blockades and direct action against the pipeline in general with popularizing the global anti-extractivist Blockadia movement. On September 27, 2012, protesters began tree sitting in the path of the Keystone pipeline near Winnsboro, Texas. Eight people stood on tree platforms just ahead of where crews were cutting down trees to make way for the pipeline. On October 31, 2012, Green Party presidential candidate Jill Stein was arrested in Texas for criminal trespass after trying to deliver food and supplies to the Keystone XL protesters.

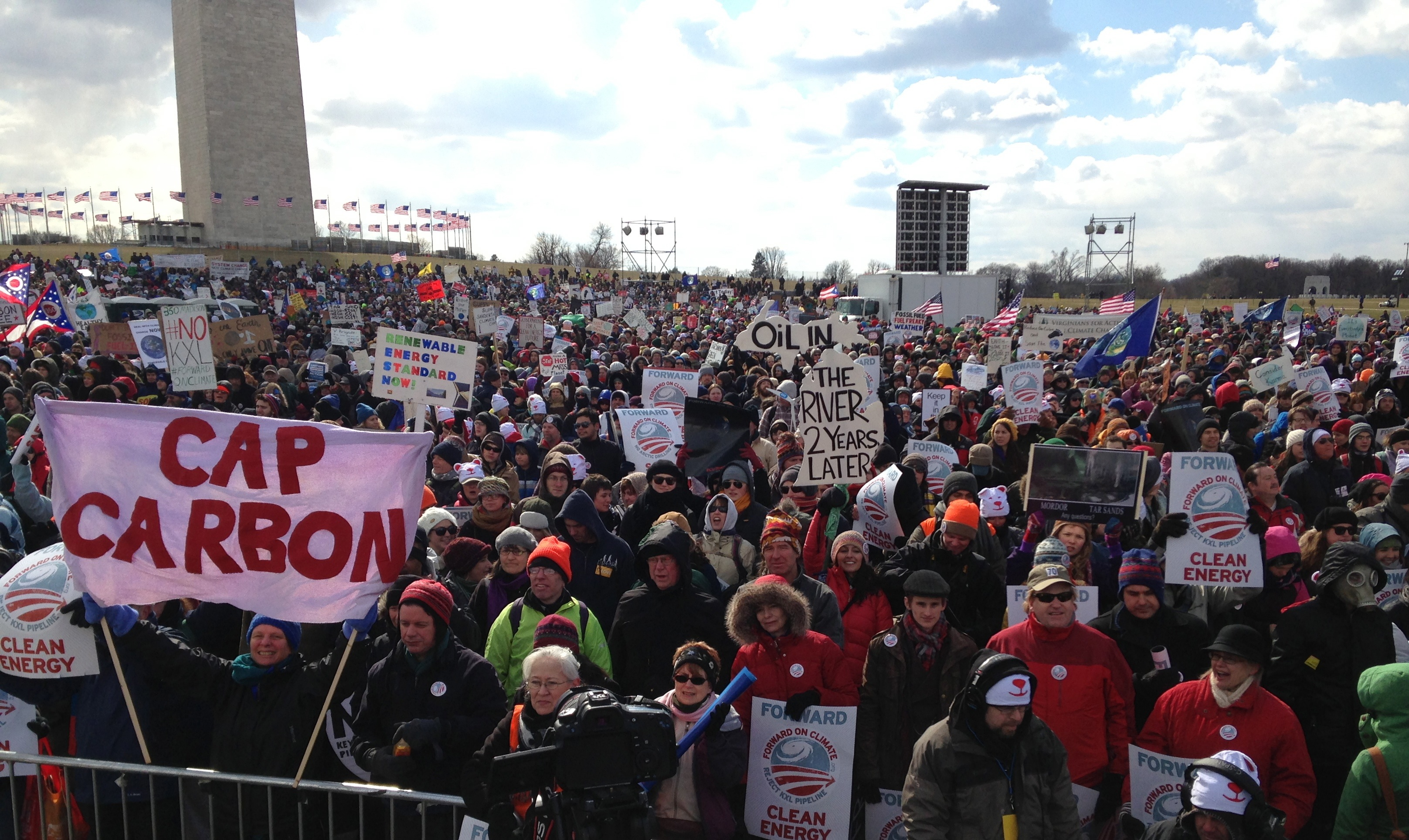
An estimated crowd of 35,000–50,000 gathers near the Washington Monument in February 2013 to protest the Keystone XL pipeline and support action on climate change

On February 17, 2013, approximately 35,000 to 50,000 protesters attended a rally in Washington, D.C. organized by the Sierra Club, 350.org, and the Hip Hop Caucus, in what Bill McKibben described as "the biggest climate rally by far, by far, by far, in U.S. history". The event featured Lennox Yearwood; Chief Jacqueline Thomas, immediate past chief of the Saik'uz First Nation; Van Jones; Crystal Lameman, of Beaver Lake Cree Nation; Michael Brune, Sen. Sheldon Whitehouse (D-RI), and others as invited speakers. Simultaneous 'solidarity' protests were also organized in several other cities across the United States, Europe, and Canada. Protesters called on President Obama to reject the planned pipeline extension when deciding the fate of the pipeline after Secretary of State John Kerry completes a review of the project.

On March 2, 2014, approximately 1000–1200 protesters marched from Georgetown University to the White House to stage a protest against the Keystone Pipeline. 398 arrests were made of people tying themselves to the White House fence with zip-ties and lying on a black tarp in front of the fence. The tarp represented an oil spill, and many protesters dressed in white jumpsuits covered in black ink, symbolizing oil-covered hazmat suits, laid down upon the tarp.

There is a long history of opposition to colonialism by indigenous people. In the instance of the Keystone XL pipeline, there have been many protests and actions taken against the construction of the pipeline. In may of 2019, the Sioux Nation held their own public hearing for native, and non-native people to voice their concerns about the Keystone Pipeline. In a public announcement from the Rosebud Sioux Tribe they state, “The Rosebud Sioux Tribe, along with other tribal nations, recently filed a lawsuit against the Trump Administration for numerous violations of the law in the Keystone XL pipeline permitting process. The Tribes are asking the court to rescind the illegal issuance of the Keystone XL pipeline presidential permit.”

== Environmental concerns ==
Environmental concerns include the potential for air pollution, and for leaks and spills, that could pollute critical water supplies and cause harm to migratory birds and other wildlife. One of the major concerns was the way in which the original route crossed the Sandhills, the large wetland ecosystem in Nebraska, and the Ogallala Aquifer, one of the largest reserves of fresh water in the world.

=== The Sandhills region and Ogallala Aquifer ===
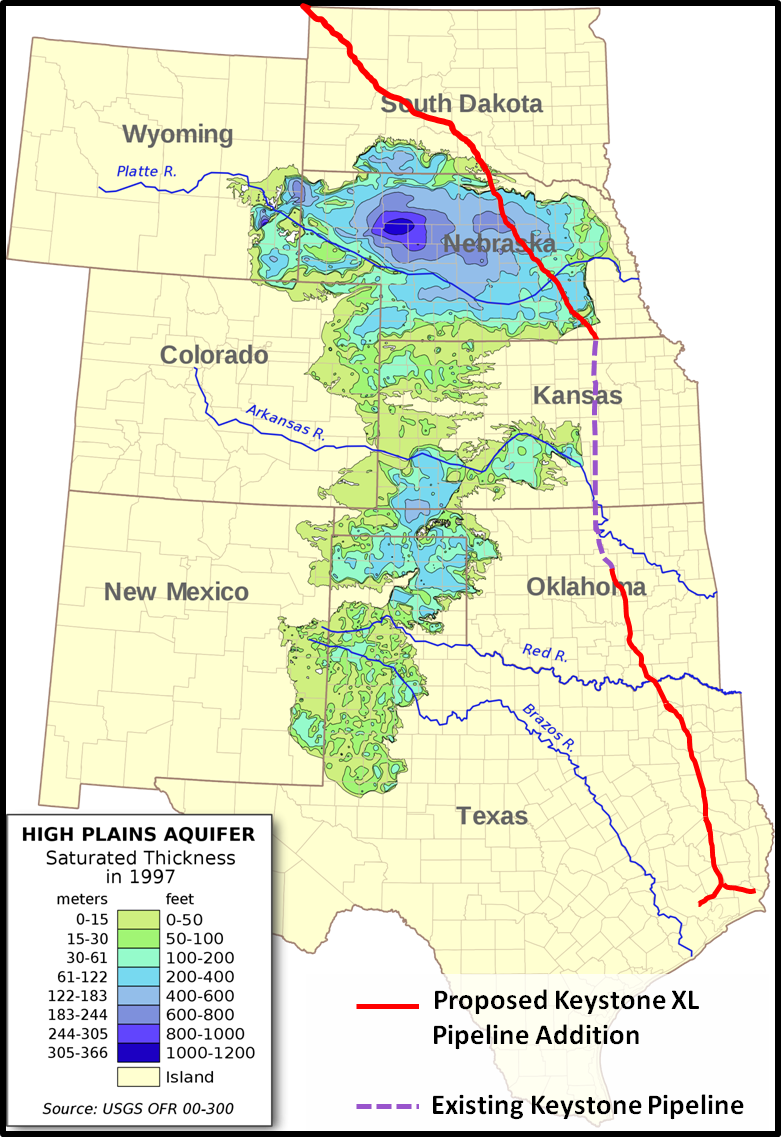
A map showing aquifer thickness of the Ogallala Aquifer with the proposed Keystone XL pipeline route laid over

Since 2010, there were concerns that a pipeline spill could threaten the Ogallala Aquifer, one of the world's largest fresh water reserves. The Ogallala Aquifer spans eight states, provides drinking water for two million people, and supports $20 billion in agriculture. Critics say that a major leak could ruin drinking water and devastate the mid-western U.S. economy.

On November 10, 2011, the Department of State postponed a final decision while investigating "potential alternative routes around the Sandhills in Nebraska" in response to concerns that the project was not in the United States' national interest.

In its November 11 response, TransCanada pointed out fourteen different routes for Keystone XL were being studied, eight that impacted Nebraska. They included one potential alternative route in Nebraska that would have avoided the entire Sandhills region and Ogallala Aquifer and six alternatives that would have reduced pipeline mileage crossing the Sandhills or the aquifer. The Keystone XL proposal faced criticism from environmentalists and a minority of the members of the United States Congress.

On November 22, 2011, the Nebraska unicameral legislature passed unanimously two bills with the governor's signature that enacted a compromise agreed upon with the pipeline builder to move the route and approved up to US$2 million in state funding for an environmental study.

On November 30, 2011, a group of Republican senators introduced legislation aimed at forcing the Obama administration to make a decision within 60 days. In December 2011, Congress passed a bill giving the Obama Administration a 60-day deadline to make a decision on the application to build the Keystone XL Pipeline.

In 2011, after opposition for laying the pipeline in this area, TransCanada agreed to change the route and skip the Sandhills, even though pipeline industry spokesmen had maintained that existing pipelines carrying crude oil and refined liquid hydrocarbons have crossed over the Ogallala Aquifer for years in southeast Wyoming, eastern Colorado and New Mexico, western Nebraska, Kansas, Oklahoma, and Texas. The Pioneer crude oil pipeline crosses east–west across Nebraska, and the Pony Express pipeline, which crosses the Ogallala Aquifer in Colorado, Nebraska, and Kansas, was being converted as of 2013 from natural gas to crude oil, under a permit from the Federal Energy Regulatory Commission.

In January 2012, President Obama rejected the application amid protests about the pipeline's impact on Nebraska's environmentally sensitive Sandhills region. The deadline for the decision had "prevented a full assessment of the pipeline's impact".

On September 5, 2012, TransCanada submitted an environmental report on the new route in Nebraska, which the company says is "based on extensive feedback from Nebraskans, and reflects our shared desire to minimize the disturbance of land and sensitive resources in the state". The March 2013 U.S. Department of State Bureau of Oceans and International Environmental and Scientific Affairs supplemental environmental impact statement (SEIS) stated that the original proposals, would not cause "significant impacts to most resources along the proposed Project route". This included the shortening of the pipeline to 875 miles (1,408 km); its avoidance of "crossing the NDEQ-identified Sandhills Region" and "reduction of the length of pipeline crossing the Northern High Plains Aquifer system, which includes the Ogallala formation". In response to a Freedom of Information Act request for route information, the Department of State revealed on June 24, 2013, that "Neither Cardno ENTRIX nor TransCanada ever submitted GIS information to the Department of State, nor was either corporation required to do so." In response to the Department of State's report, which recommended neither acceptance nor rejection, an editor of The New York Times recommended that Obama should reject the project, which "even by the State Department's most cautious calculations—can only add to the [climate change] problem". (Note: The Alberta government placed a $30,000 ad entitled "Keystone XL: The Choice of Reason" in The New York Times to counter the editorial (CBC March 17, 2013).) On March 21, Mother Jones revealed that key personnel employed by Environment Resources Management (ERM), the consulting firm responsible for generating most of the SEIS, had previously performed contract work for TransCanada corporation. In addition, when the State Department released the original proposal ERM had submitted to secure the SEIS contract, portions of the work histories of key personnel were redacted.

In April 2013, the EPA challenged the U.S. State Department report's conclusion that the pipeline would not result in greater oil sand production, noting that "while informative, [it] is not based on an updated energy-economic modeling effort". Overall, the EPA rated the SEIS with their category "EO-2" (EO for "environmental objections" and 2 for "insufficient information").

In May 2013 Republicans in the House of Representatives defended the Northern Route Approval Act, which would allow for congressional approval of the pipeline, on the grounds that the pipeline created jobs and energy independence. If enacted the Northern Route Approval Act would waive the requirement for permits for a foreign company and bypass the need for President Obama's approval, and the debate in the Democrat-controlled U.S. Senate, concerned about serious environmental risks, that could result in the rejection of the pipeline.

In April 2013, TransCanada Corporation changed the original proposed route of Keystone XL to minimize "disturbance of land, water resources and special areas"; the new route was approved by Nebraska Governor Dave Heineman in January 2013. On April 18, 2014, the Obama administration announced that the review of the controversial Keystone XL oil pipeline has been extended indefinitely, pending the result of a legal challenge to a Nebraska pipeline siting law that could change the route.

On January 9, 2015, the Nebraska Supreme Court cleared the way for construction, and on the same day the House voted in favor of the pipeline. On January 29, 2015, the Keystone XL Pipeline was passed by the Senate 62–36. On February 11, 2015, the Keystone XL Pipeline was passed by the House of Representatives with the proposed Senate Amendments 270–152. The Keystone XL Pipeline bill was not officially sent to President Obama, starting the official ten-day count towards the bill becoming law without presidential signature, until February 24, 2015. Republicans delayed delivering the bill over the Presidents Day holiday weekend to ensure Congress would be in session if the president were to veto the bill. On February 24, 2015, the bill was vetoed and returned for congressional action. On March 4, 2015, the Senate held a vote and failed to override President Obama's veto of the bill; the vote was 62 to 37, less than the two-thirds majority required to override a presidential veto. The review by the State Department is ongoing. On June 15, 2015, the House Oversight Committee threatened to subpoena the State Department for the latter's withholding of records relevant to the process since March 2015 and calling the process "unnecessarily secretive". Despite some records being posted by consulted agencies such as the EPA, the State Department has not responded to the request. On November 2, 2015, TransCanada asked the Obama administration to suspend its permit application for the Keystone XL.

=== Potential for oil spills ===
University of Nebraska–Lincoln professor John Stansbury conducted an independent analysis which provides more detail on the potential risks for the Ogallala Aquifer. Stansbury concludes that safety assessments provided by TransCanada are misleading: "We can expect no fewer than 2 major spills per state during the 50-year projected lifetime of the pipeline. These spills could release as much as 180,000 barrels (29,000 m^{3}) of oil each."

Other items of note in Stansbury's analysis:

- "While TransCanada estimates that the Keystone XL will have 11 significant spills, defined as more than 50 barrels (8 m^{3}) of crude oil, over 50 years, a more realistic assessment is 91 significant spills over the pipeline's operational lifetime. TransCanada arbitrarily and improperly adjusted spill factors to produce an estimate of one major spill on the 1,673 mi (2,692 km) of pipeline about every five years, but federal data on the actual incidence of spills on comparable pipelines indicate a more likely average of almost two major spills per year. (The existing Keystone I pipeline has had one major spill and 11 smaller spills in its first year of operation.)"
- "Analysis of the time needed to shut down the pipeline shows that response to a leak at a river crossing could conservatively take more than ten times longer than the 11 minutes and 30 seconds that TransCanada assumes. (After the June 2010 spill of more than 800,000 US gallons (3,000 m^{3}) of crude oil into a tributary of the Kalamazoo River, an Enbridge tar sands pipeline—a 30-inch (760 mm) pipe compared to the 36-inch (910 mm) Keystone XL—was not completely shut down for 12 hours.)"
- "Realistic calculations yield worst-case spill estimates of more than 180,000 barrels (29,000 m^{3}) in the Nebraska Sandhills above the Ogallala Aquifer, more than 160,000 barrels (25,000 m^{3}) of crude oil at the Yellowstone River crossings, more than 140,000 barrels (22,000 m^{3}) at the Platte River crossing and more than 120,000 barrels (19,000 m^{3}) at the Missouri River crossing."
- "Contaminants from a release at the Missouri or Yellowstone River crossing would enter Lake Sakakawea in North Dakota where they would adversely affect drinking water intakes, aquatic wildlife, and recreation. Contaminants from a spill at the Platte River crossing would travel downstream unabated into the Missouri River for several hundred miles affecting drinking water intakes for hundreds of thousands of people (e.g., Lincoln, Nebraska; Omaha, Nebraska; Nebraska City, Nebraska; St. Joseph, Missouri; Kansas City, Missouri) as well as aquatic habitats and recreational activities. In addition, other constituents from the spill would pose serious risks to humans and to aquatic species in the river."
- "The worst-case site for such a spill is in the Sandhills region of Nebraska. The Sandhills are ancient sand dunes that have been stabilized by grasses. Because of their very permeable geology, nearly 100 percent of the annual rainfall infiltrates to a very shallow aquifer, often less than 20 feet (6 m) below the surface. This aquifer is the well-known Ogallala Aquifer that is one of the most productive and important aquifers in the world."

Portions of the pipeline will also cross an active seismic zone that had a 4.3-magnitude earthquake as recently as 2002. Opponents claim that TransCanada applied to the U.S. government to use thinner steel and pump at higher pressures than normal.

TransCanada CEO Russ Girling has described the Keystone Pipeline as "routine", noting that TransCanada has been building similar pipelines in North America for half a century and that there were 200,000 miles (320,000 km) of similar oil pipelines in the United States in 2011. He also stated that the Keystone Pipeline was planned to include 57 improvements above standard requirements demanded by U.S. regulators, making it "the safest pipeline ever built". Rep. Ed Whitfield, a member of the House Committee on Energy and Commerce concurred, saying "this is the most technologically advanced and safest pipeline ever proposed". However, while TransCanada had asserted that a set of 57 conditions will ensure Keystone XL's safe operation, Anthony Swift of the Natural Resources Defense Council asserted that all but a few of these conditions simply restate current minimum standards.

TransCanada claims that they will take 100% responsibility for any potential environmental problems. According to their website, "It's our responsibility—as a good company and under law. If anything happens on the Keystone XL Pipeline, rapid response is key. That's why our Emergency Response plans are approved by state and federal agencies, and why we practice them regularly. We conduct regular emergency exercises, and aerial surveys every two weeks. We're ready to respond with a highly-trained response team standing by."

=== Alberta oil sands ===
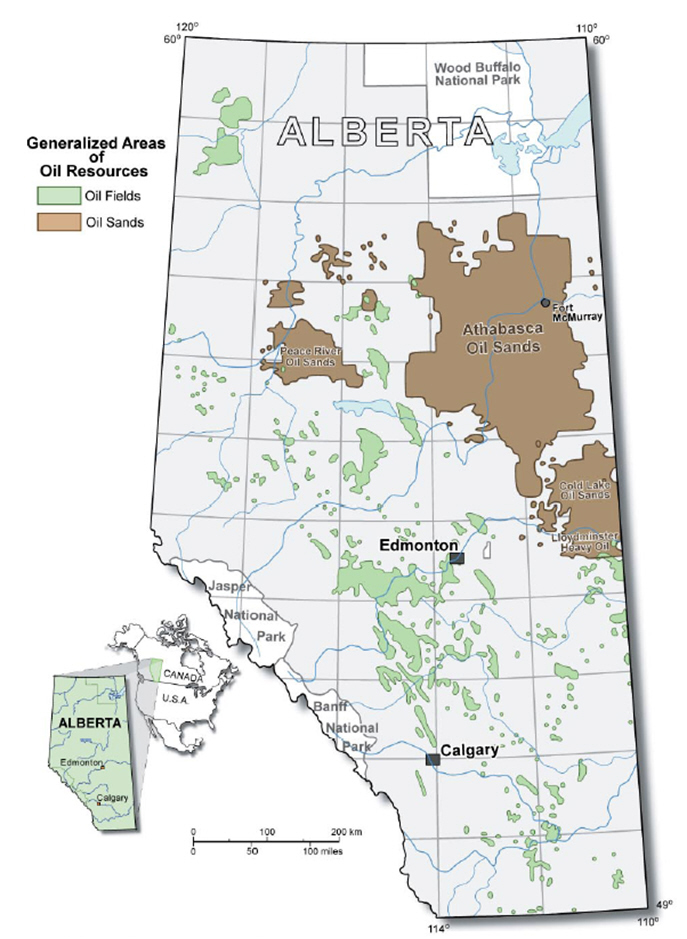
The Athabasca oil sands in Alberta, Canada, are a very large source of bitumen, which can be upgraded to synthetic crude oil.

Keystone XL was proposed to carry crude derived from Alberta's oil sands, not from underground reservoirs like conventional petroleum, but in a tarry fossil fuel called bitumen. A mix of clay, sand, rock which combined can be solid as a "hockey puck". To access the bitumen, Alberta's boreal forests are cut away in enormous strip mines.

Different environmental groups, citizens, and politicians have raised concerns about the potential negative impacts of the Keystone XL project.

The main issues are the risk of oil spills along the pipeline, which would traverse highly sensitive terrain, and 17% higher greenhouse gas emissions from the extraction of oil sands compared to extraction of conventional oil.

=== Leaks and spills ===
Since 2010, the Keystone Pipeline has had 23 leak incidents, spilling over one million gallons of crude oil.

In 2016, about 400 barrels (64 m^{3}) were released from the original Keystone pipe network via leaks, which federal investigators said resulted from a "weld anomaly".

On November 17, 2017, the pipeline leaked around 9,600 barrels (1,530 m^{3}) onto farmland near Amherst, South Dakota. The oil leak is the largest seen from the Keystone pipeline in the state. The leak lasted for several minutes, with no initial reports of damage to water sources or wildlife. Although the spill did not happen on Sioux property, it was in close enough proximity to potentially contaminate the aquifer used for water. The pipeline was immediately shut down, and TransCanada began using the pipe again 12 days after the leak. For much of late 2017, the Keystone pipeline operated at reduced pressure during remediation efforts. The federal Pipeline and Hazardous Materials Safety Administration said that the failure "may have been caused by mechanical damage to the pipeline and coating associated with a weight installed on the pipeline in 2008". Later, the National Transportation Safety Board (NTSB) found that a metal tracked vehicle had run over the area, damaging the pipeline. In April 2018, a federal investigation found that 408,000 US gallons (1,540 m^{3}) of crude had spilled at the site, almost twice what TransCanada had reported. That number made it the seventh-largest onshore oil spill since 2002.

In April 2018, Reuters reviewed documents that showed that Keystone had "leaked substantially more oil, and more often, in the United States than the company indicated to regulators in risk assessments before operations began in 2010".

On October 31, 2019, a rupture occurred near Edinburg, North Dakota, spilling an estimated 9,120 barrels (1,450 m^{3}) where the 45,000 US gallons (170 m^{3}) that were not recovered from the 0.5 acre containment have spread contaminating 5 acres. This occurred while the South Dakota Water Management Board was in the middle of hearings on whether or not to allow TC Energy to use millions of gallons of water to build camps to house temporary construction workers for Keystone XL construction.

==== 2022 spill ====
On December 7, 2022, TC Energy in Canada initiated a shutdown of the Keystone Pipeline System in response to a 9PM Eastern Time alarm signaling a loss in pressure. TC Energy confirmed that there had been a release of oil into a creek located in Washington County, Kansas, 20 miles to the south of Steele City, Nebraska. About 588,000 gallons of tar sands crude was released. US oil prices rose about 4% the following day following news of the leak and shutdown. The leak was the largest in the United States in nearly a decade.

==== 2025 spill ====
On April 8, 2025, the pipeline suffered a rupture near Fort Ransom, North Dakota. It was later estimated that about 3,500 barrels, or 147,000 gallons, of oil spilled. A crack along a weld was the cause.

=== Water supplies ===
Pipeline construction could affect water supplies upstream of several Native American reservations, even though the pipeline does not lead through any tribal land. TC Energy is applying for permits to tap the Cheyenne River, White River (South Dakota), and Bad River (South Dakota) for use during construction primarily for drilling to install pipe, to build pump stations and to control dust.

=== Increased carbon emissions ===
Environmental organizations such as the Natural Resources Defense Council (NRDC) also oppose the project due to its transportation of oil from oil sands. In its March 2010 report, the NRDC stated that "the Keystone XL Pipeline undermines the U.S. commitment to a clean energy economy", instead "delivering dirty fuel at high costs". On June 23, 2010, 50 Democrats in Congress in their letter to Secretary of State Hillary Clinton warned that "building this pipeline has the potential to undermine America's clean energy future and international leadership on climate change", referencing the higher input quantity of fossil fuels necessary to take the tar and turn it into a usable fuel product in comparison to other conventionally derived fossil fuels. The House Energy and Commerce Committee's chairman at the time, Representative Henry Waxman, had also urged the State Department to block Keystone XL for greenhouse gas emission reasons.

In December 2010, the No Tar Sands Oil campaign, sponsored by action groups including Corporate Ethics International, NRDC, Sierra Club, 350.org, National Wildlife Federation, Friends of the Earth, Greenpeace, and Rainforest Action Network, was launched.

In September 2011, Joe Oliver, Canada's Minister of Natural Resources, sharply criticized opponents of oil sands development in a speech to the Canadian Club of Toronto, arguing that oil sands account for about 0.1% of global greenhouse-gas emissions, coal power plants powered in the U.S. generate almost 40 times more greenhouse-gas emissions than Canada's oil sands and California bitumen is more GHG-intensive than the oil sands.

As of 2013, however, producing and processing tar sands oil results in roughly 14 per cent more greenhouse gas emissions than the average oil used in the U.S. The State Department's 2012 Final Supplemental Environmental Impact Statement (Final SEIS) estimated that producing and transporting oil to the pipeline's capacity would increase greenhouse-gas emissions compared to alternative sources of oil, if the denial of the pipeline project meant that the oil would stay in the ground. "However, ... such a change is not likely to occur. [A]pproval or denial of any one crude oil transport project, including the proposed Project, is unlikely to significantly impact the rate of extraction in the oil sands, or the continued demand for heavy crude oil." To the extent that the oil would be extracted in any case, the relevant comparison would be to alternative means of transporting it; the Final SEIS considered three alternative scenarios and found that "total GHG emissions associated with construction and operation (direct and indirect) combined would be higher for each of the three scenarios than for the entire route encompassing the proposed Project".

In a February 2015, the US EPA responded to the U.S. Department of State's Final Supplemental Environmental Impact Statement (Final SEIS) for the Keystone XL Pipeline Project, that the pipeline will significantly increase greenhouse gas emissions because it will lead to the expansion of Alberta's carbon-intensive oilsands. and that over the proposed 50-year timeline of the pipeline, this could mean releasing as much as "1.37 billion more tons of greenhouse gases into the atmosphere". EPA concluded that due to the current relatively cheap cost of oil, companies might be less likely to set up their own developments in the oil sands. It would be too expensive for the companies to ship by rail. However, "the presence of the pipeline, which offers an inexpensive way to move the oil to market, could increase the likelihood that companies would extract from the oil sands even when prices are low". The EPA suggested that the State Department should "revisit" its prior conclusions in light of the drop in oil prices.

TransCanada Corporation responded with a letter by President and CEO Russel K. Girling stating that TransCanada "rejects the EPA inference that at lower oil prices the [Keystone XL Pipeline] Project will increase the rate of oil sands production growth and accompanying greenhouse gas emissions". Girling maintained that the EPA's conclusions "are not supported by the facts outlined in the Final SEIS or actual observations of the marketplace".

== Public opinion polls ==
=== United States ===
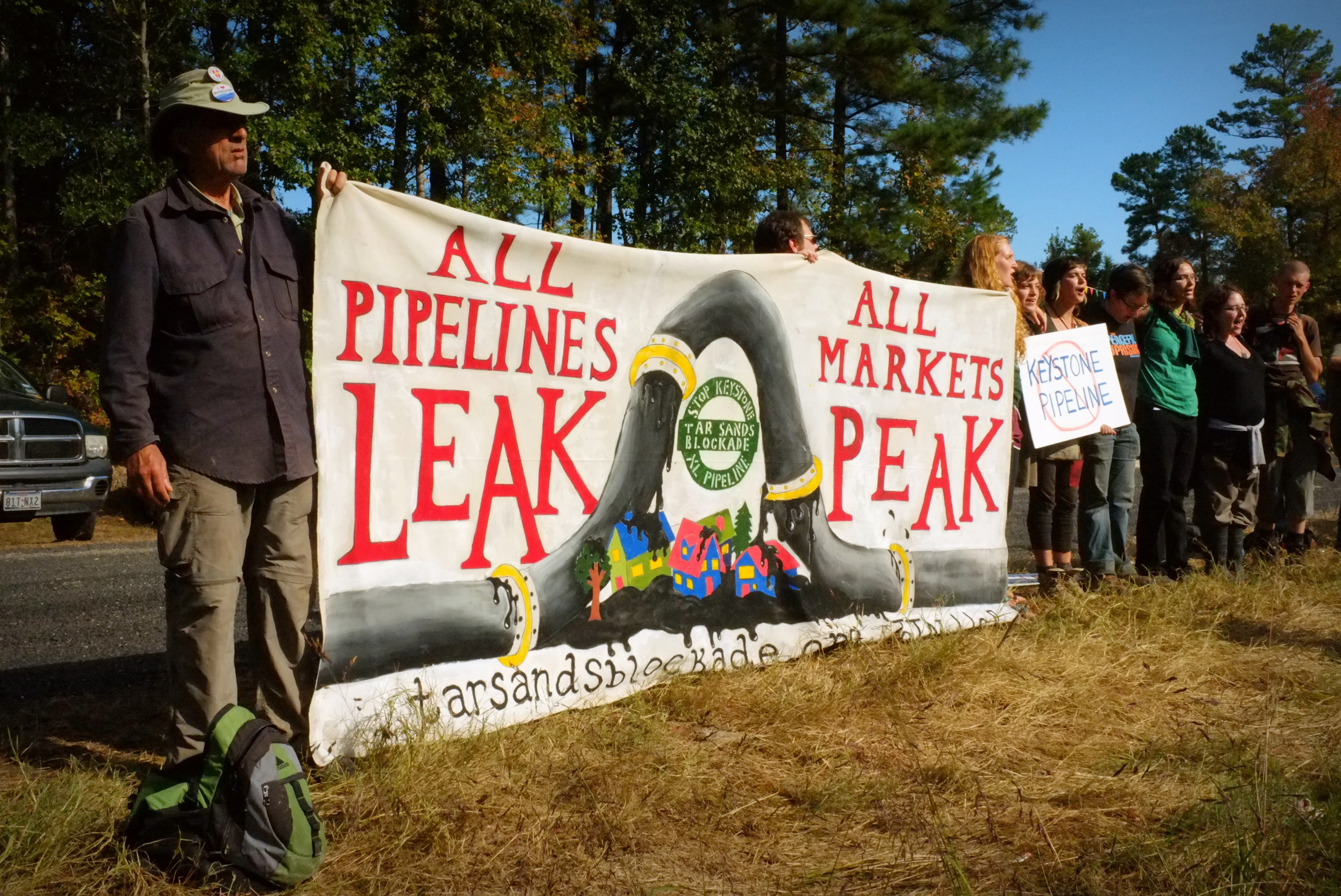
Protest near construction work for the Keystone XL pipeline in Winnsboro, Texas

Public opinion polls taken by independent national polling organizations near the beginning of the dispute showed majority support for the proposed pipeline in the U.S. A September 2013 poll by the Pew Center found 65% favored the project and 30% opposed. The same poll found the pipeline favored by majorities of men (69%), women (61%), Democrats (51%), Republicans (82%), independents (64%), as well as by those in every division of age, education, economic status, and geographic region. The only group identified by the Pew poll as opposing the pipeline were Democrats who identified themselves as liberal (41% in favor versus 54% opposed).

The results of polls about the Keystone XL pipeline taken by independent national polling organizations from 2012 to 2014 varied:

- Gallup (March 2012): 57% government should approve, 29% government should not approve
- Pew Center (September 2013): 65% favor, 30% oppose
- Rasmussen (January 2014): 57% favor, 28% oppose (of likely voters)
- USA Today (January 2014): 56% favor, 41% oppose
- Washington Post–ABC News (April 2014): 65% government should approve, 22% government should not approve
- CBS News – Roper (May 2014): 56% favor, 28% oppose

In contrast, Pew's February 2017 poll showed that support for the pipeline had fallen to 42%, with 48% of polled respondents opposing the pipeline, a 17 percentage point drop in support since 2014, with the majority of the shift due to a sharp decline in support among Democrats and Democrat-leaning independents. At the time of the poll, only 17% of Democrats favored the pipeline. Support among Republicans had also fallen (to 76%) but not as steeply as among Democrats.

=== Canada ===
An Angus Reid Institute poll, published on March 9, 2017, showed that 48% of respondents across Canada supported the Keystone XL revival, while 33% opposed it, and 20% were uncertain. In Alberta, support was at 77%, and in Quebec at 36%.

== Alternative projects ==
On November 16, 2011, Enbridge announced it was buying ConocoPhillips's 50% interest in the Seaway pipeline that flowed from the Gulf of Mexico to the Cushing hub. In cooperation with Enterprise Products Partners LP it is reversing the Seaway pipeline so that an oversupply of oil at Cushing can reach the Gulf. This project replaced the earlier proposed alternative Wrangler pipeline project from Cushing to the Gulf Coast. It began reversed operations on May 17, 2012. However, according to industries, the Seaway line alone is not enough for oil transportation to the Gulf Coast.

On January 19, 2012, TransCanada announced it may shorten the initial path to remove the need for federal approval. TransCanada said that work on that section of the pipeline could start in June 2012 and be on-line by the middle to late 2013.

In April 2013, it was learned that the government of Alberta was investigating, as an alternative to the pipeline south through the United States, a shorter all-Canadian pipeline north to the Arctic coast, from where the oil would be taken by tanker ships through the Arctic Ocean to markets in Asia and Europe and in August, TransCanada announced a new proposal to create a longer all-Canada pipeline, called Energy East, that would extend as far east as the port city of Saint John, New Brunswick, at the same time providing feedstock to refineries in Montreal, Quebec City, and Saint John.

The Enbridge "Alberta Clipper" expansion of the existing cross-border Line 67 pipeline began in late 2013. It added 350,000 barrels (56,000 m^{3}) per day capacity to the existing pipeline for cumulative total of 800,000 barrels (130,000 m^{3}) per day. In late 2014 Enbridge was awaiting final approval from the US State Department and expected completion of the last phase in mid-2015. According to Enbridge, Line 67 Upgrade Project Phase 2 was completed, and entered into service in July 2015.

== Lawsuits ==
In September 2009, independent refiner CVR sued TransCanada for Keystone Pipeline tolls seeking $250 million damage compensation or release from transportation agreements. CVR alleged that the final tolls for the Canadian segment of the pipeline were 146% higher than initially presented, while the tolls for the U.S. segment were 92% higher. In April 2010, three smaller refineries sued TransCanada to break Keystone transportation contracts, saying the new pipeline has been beset with cost overruns.

In October 2009, a suit was filed by the Natural Resources Defense Council that challenged the pipeline on the grounds that its permit was based on a deficient environmental impact statement. The suit was thrown out by a federal judge on procedural grounds, ruling that the NRDC lacked the authority to bring it.

In June 2012, Sierra Club, Clean Energy Future Oklahoma, and the East Texas Sub Regional Planning Commission filed a joint complaint in the United States District Court for the Western District of Oklahoma seeking injunctive relief and petitioning for a review of the U.S. Army Corps of Engineers' action in issuing Nationwide Permit 12 permits for the Cushing, Oklahoma, to the Gulf Coast portion of the pipeline. The suit alleges that, contrary to the federal Administrative Procedure Act, 5 U.S.C. § 701 et. seq., the Corps' issuance of the permits was arbitrary and capricious and an abuse of discretion.

In early January 2016, TransCanada announced it would initiate an ISDS claim under NAFTA against the United States, seeking $15 billion in damages and calling the denial of a permit for Keystone XL "arbitrary and unjustified".

== See also ==
- Climate change in the United States
- Environmental racism in the United States
- List of oil pipelines
- List of oil refineries
- List of articles about Canadian oil sands
- List of pipeline accidents in the United States in the 21st century
