= Corporate environmental responsibility =

Corporate environmental responsibility (CER) refers to a company's duties to abstain from damaging natural environments. The term derives from corporate social responsibility (CSR).

== Background ==
The environmental aspect of corporate social responsibility has been debated over the past few decades, as stakeholders increasingly require organizations to become more environmentally aware and socially responsible. In the traditional business model, environmental protection was considered only in relation to the "public interest". Hitherto, governments had maintained principal responsibility for ensuring environmental management and conservation.

The public sector has been focused on the development of regulations and the imposition of sanctions as a means to facilitating environmental protection. Recently, the private sector has adopted the approach of co-responsibility towards the prevention and alleviation of environmental damage. The sectors and their roles have been changing, with the private sector becoming more active in the protection of the environment. Many governments, corporations, and big companies are now providing strategies for environmental protection and economic growth.

The World Commission on Environment published the Brundtland Report in 1987 to address sustainable development. Since then, managers, scholars, and business owners have tried to determine why and how big corporations should incorporate environmental aspects into their own policies. In recent years, an increasing number of companies have pledged to protect natural environments.

== Relations to corporate social responsibility ==
There are different perceptions of corporate social responsibility between government, the private sector, non-governmental organizations (NGOs) and society in general, and thus, the concept has no single definition.

Corporate social responsibility may cover:

- A company running its business responsibly in relation to internal stakeholders (shareholders, employees, customers and suppliers)
- The role of business in relation to the state (locally and nationally) as well as to inter-state institutions or standards
- Business performance as a responsible member of the society in which it operates and the global community."

The European Union defines corporate social responsibility as "...the concept that an enterprise is accountable for its impact on all relevant stakeholders. It is the continuing commitment by a business to behave fairly and responsibly and contribute to economic development while improving the quality of life of the workforce and their families as well as of the local community and society at large." According to this definition, a CSR strategy is more focused on social aspects, particularly the interests of stakeholders.

Corporate environmental responsibility (CER) is, in many ways, connected to CSR, as both of them influence environmental protection. CER, however, is strictly about the consideration of environmental implications and protection within corporate strategy. The understanding of CER cannot be separated from CSR—both are interconnected and based on environmental protection. There are three major areas related to these two concepts—economic, environmental and social. CER is focused more on economic and environmental while CSR relates to social and environmental aspects. Economy, society, and environment all play significant roles in the development of an efficient and effective company strategy.

== Main elements ==
These cover the environmental implications of a company's operations:

- Eliminate waste and emissions
- Maximize the efficient use of resources and productivity
- Minimize activities that might impair the enjoyment of resources by future generations.

== Drivers and challenges ==
A review of 54 studies on small and medium-sized enterprises found that environmental regulation was the most frequently cited external driver of adopting environmental management practices, appearing in 16 studies, followed by customer demands in 15. The review also identified collaboration with similar businesses and government support programs as drivers. Some studies in the review found that weak regulations offered little incentive to act or that firms responded to legal pressure by meeting only minimum requirements. The review also cited research questioning whether adoption prompted by regulation led to substantial improvements in environmental performance. Within businesses, 15 studies cited managers' values and attitudes, and 14 cited expected gains in reputation. The review also identified employee awareness and skills as drivers.

In the same review of small and medium-sized enterprises, resource shortages were the most frequently cited internal barrier to adopting environmental management practices, appearing in 22 studies. Limited employee engagement appeared in 15 studies and business size in 4. High certification costs were the most frequently cited external barrier, appearing in 7 studies, while limited government or consultancy support appeared in 4. One study cited in the review suggested that meeting environmental regulations might raise non-production overhead costs disproportionately for smaller firms. The review also reported that many small businesses doubted whether adopting these practices would reduce their expenses.

A challenge in defining corporate environmental responsibility is determining how much responsibility individual companies bear for addressing climate change. Philosopher Säde Hormio rejects the view that corporate duties are limited to increasing shareholder profits and argues that corporations share responsibility for climate mitigation with governments and other actors. In her account, a company's duties depend partly on its resources and what it can reasonably influence, including how it makes and markets its products and how it manages its supply chain. Hormio treats responsibility for past emissions as more limited, but argues that corporations that spread climate misinformation to protect profits acquired additional duties to help mitigate climate change and could also be asked to compensate for their past conduct.

== Worldwide perspectives on corporate environmental responsibility ==
The majority of international CSR studies focus on business practices and its aspects, such as business economics and the legality of environmental law. Most companies are noticing the importance of taking into account one of its most important stakeholders: employees and customers and their commitment to sustainability. Studies have demonstrated that once companies place sustainability practices they can be directly linked to financial success and customer satisfaction, which in turn can be used as a marketing tool. An additional study highlighted that these practices are in effect at larger firms with more resources to fund environmental responsibility. Although every country has a different culture, and each country determines their own scale of environmental responsibility, research has shown that there is a standard global human values that drive customer needs and wants. Companies have taken initiatives to take sustainability and align it with each company's economic goals. Part of this initiative has included publishing sustainability reports, offering more transparency of company operations to customers. Managers and other people at the top, play the key role in decision-making and implementing the firm's sustainability practices.

== Benefits of corporate environmental responsibility ==
Corporate social responsibility can prove to be more profitable for companies and to extend it survivability in markets because greater awareness on this topic, in both social and business markets, has been in higher demand. Customers have responded with overall satisfaction and loyalty when companies have a better CSR, especially in countries like Spain and Brazil. Culture has an impact on the CSR ratings and studies, as well as human values across different nations.

This topic can also be found under sustainable development. This area is concerned with not only protecting the environment but maintaining economical growth. There were several agreements internationally to help adopt new business practices that held these standards, but they were considered individual and there was no law-abiding body to regulate nor implement them.

One of the other factors that is considered an integral part of sustainable development are human beings, and specific groups and their habitat. Counties and companies that more developed would lead, and other small countries and business would slowly make gains. It is important to recognize that just because corporate environmental responsibility is being recognized that consumption is something that is not discouraged.

The idea of corporate environmental responsibility is for humans to be more aware of the environmental impact and counteract their pollution/carbon footprint on the natural resources. One of the main factors is to reduce carbon footprint and carbon emissions. Many of the studies focus on trying to find a balance between economic growth and reducing waste and cleaner environments.

Furthermore, many firms are discovering that there is an advantage to advocating for environmental regulations and preparing for them to be implemented before they become law. In a recent study, the researcher found that firms support climate change legislation as a means of gaining power over their competitors. Essentially, even if a new regulation hurts a firm in the short term, the firm may embrace it because they know that it will hurt their competitors even more. This allows them to come out on top in the long run.

== Summary ==
The environmental aspects of security have increasingly become a major issue being considered by states. Globalization also plays a key role in the adoption of new environmental strategies as a multi-faceted process influencing modern societies, and creating interconnected and multidimensional environments.

Corporate environmental responsibility is used by multinational corporations as well as small, local organizations. It is highlighted and more institutionalized because of stakeholders' awareness of the huge impacts of business activities on the environment. To understand CER, its relations with CSR strategies need to be recognized. CER and CSR are the main strategies that help in the creation of efficient and environmentally sustainable businesses.

== See also ==
- Triple bottom line
