= Wilberton Township, Fayette County, Illinois =

Wilberton Township
- Township
- Location in Fayette County

- Fayette County's location in Illinois
- Coordinates: 38°52′00″N 88°58′37″W
- Country: United States
- State: Illinois
- County: Fayette
- Established: November 9, 1859

Area
  - Total: 35.55 sq mi (92.1 km^{2})
  - Land: 35.53 sq mi (92.0 km^{2})
  - Water: 0.02 sq mi (0.052 km^{2}) 0.05%
- Elevation: 554 ft (169 m)

Population (2020)
  - Total: 522
  - Density: 14.7/sq mi (5.67/km^{2})
- Time zone: UTC-6 (CST)
  - Summer (DST): UTC-5 (CDT)
- ZIP codes: 62471, 62880, 62885
- FIPS code: 17-051-81568

Wilberton Township is one of twenty townships in Fayette County, Illinois, USA. As of the 2020 census, its population was 522 and it contained 184 housing units. Its name changed from Richland Township on September 24, 1860.

== Geography ==
According to the 2021 census gazetteer files, Wilberton Township has a total area of 35.55 square miles (92.07 km^{2}), of which 35.53 square miles (92.02 km^{2}) (or 99.95%) is land and 0.02 square miles (0.05 km^{2}) (or 0.05%) is water.

=== Extinct towns ===
- Augsburg
- Saint Paul
- Wilberton

=== Cemeteries ===
The township contains these seven cemeteries: Augsburg, Center, Cheshier, Crowder, Frogtown, Riedle and Saint Paul Lutheran.

=== Lakes ===
- Gatch Lake

== Demographics ==
As of the 2020 census there were 522 people, 124 households, and 81 families residing in the township. The population density was 14.68 inhabitants per square mile (5.67/km^{2}). There were 184 housing units at an average density of 5.18 per square mile (2.00/km^{2}). The racial makeup of the township was 96.55% White, 0.00% African American, 0.38% Native American, 0.19% Asian, 0.19% Pacific Islander, 0.38% from other races, and 2.30% from two or more races. Hispanic or Latino of any race were 0.77% of the population.

There were 124 households, out of which 13.70% had children under the age of 18 living with them, 65.32% were married couples living together, 0.00% had a female householder with no spouse present, and 34.68% were non-families. 24.20% of all households were made up of individuals, and 14.50% had someone living alone who was 65 years of age or older. The average household size was 2.12 and the average family size was 2.41.

The township's age distribution consisted of 10.3% under the age of 18, 4.6% from 18 to 24, 22.7% from 25 to 44, 47.1% from 45 to 64, and 15.2% who were 65 years of age or older. The median age was 54.7 years. For every 100 females, there were 224.7 males. For every 100 females age 18 and over, there were 191.4 males.

The median income for a household in the township was $105,000, and the median income for a family was $118,563. Males had a median income of $30,919 versus $48,063 for females. The per capita income for the township was $47,041. About 0.0% of families and 4.6% of the population were below the poverty line, including 0.0% of those under age 18 and 0.0% of those age 65 or over.

Historical population
Census	Pop.	Note	%±
1990	402		—
2000	459		14.2%
2010	505		10.0%
2020	522		3.4%
U.S. Decennial Census

== School districts ==
- Brownstown Community Unit School District 201
- Vandalia Community Unit School District 203

== Political districts ==
- Illinois's 19th congressional district
- State House District 102
- State Senate District 51
