= Benton Township, Franklin County, Illinois =

Benton Township
- Township
- Location in Franklin County

- Franklin County's location in Illinois
- Coordinates: 37°59′44″N 88°52′09″W
- Country: United States
- State: Illinois
- County: Franklin
- Established: November 4, 1884

Area
  - Total: 36.71 sq mi (95.1 km^{2})
  - Land: 36.13 sq mi (93.6 km^{2})
  - Water: 0.58 sq mi (1.5 km^{2}) 1.59%
- Elevation: 387 ft (118 m)

Population (2020)
  - Total: 8,662
  - Density: 239.7/sq mi (92.57/km^{2})
- Time zone: UTC-6 (CST)
  - Summer (DST): UTC-5 (CDT)
- ZIP codes: 62812, 62890, 62896
- FIPS code: 17-055-05313

Benton Township is one of twelve townships in Franklin County, Illinois. As of the 2020 census, its population was 8,662 and it contained 4,222 housing units.

== Geography ==
According to the 2021 census gazetteer files, Benton Township has a total area of 36.71 square miles (95.08 km^{2}), of which 36.13 square miles (93.58 km^{2}) (or 98.41%) is land and 0.58 square miles (1.50 km^{2}) (or 1.59%) is water.

=== Cities, towns, villages ===
- Benton (east three-quarters)
- Hanaford

=== Unincorporated towns ===
- Steel City

=== Extinct towns ===
- Groat
- Logan
- Smothersville

=== Cemeteries ===
The township contains these nine cemeteries: Baxter, County Farm, Drummond, Franklin, Masonic and Odd Fellows, Memorial Park, New Union, Rea and Swofford.

=== Major highways ===
- Interstate 57
- Illinois Route 14
- Illinois Route 34

=== Airports and landing strips ===
- Bessie RLA Airport

=== Lakes ===
- Vernons Lake

== Demographics ==
As of the 2020 census there were 8,662 people, 3,684 households, and 2,084 families residing in the township. The population density was 235.93 inhabitants per square mile (91.09/km^{2}). There were 4,222 housing units at an average density of 115.00 per square mile (44.40/km^{2}). The racial makeup of the township was 93.35% White, 0.44% African American, 0.35% Native American, 0.46% Asian, 0.00% Pacific Islander, 0.72% from other races, and 4.69% from two or more races. Hispanic or Latino of any race were 2.47% of the population.

There were 3,684 households, out of which 27.00% had children under the age of 18 living with them, 42.92% were married couples living together, 9.93% had a female householder with no spouse present, and 43.43% were non-families. 37.10% of all households were made up of individuals, and 25.60% had someone living alone who was 65 years of age or older. The average household size was 2.28 and the average family size was 2.96.

The township's age distribution consisted of 21.9% under the age of 18, 7.1% from 18 to 24, 22.5% from 25 to 44, 26% from 45 to 64, and 22.3% who were 65 years of age or older. The median age was 43.1 years. For every 100 females, there were 89.4 males. For every 100 females age 18 and over, there were 90.9 males.

The median income for a household in the township was $45,299, and the median income for a family was $58,204. Males had a median income of $42,437 versus $29,199 for females. The per capita income for the township was $27,807. About 10.5% of families and 16.6% of the population were below the poverty line, including 10.9% of those under age 18 and 19.8% of those age 65 or over.

Historical population
Census	Pop.	Note	%±
2000	8,374		—
2010	8,972		7.1%
2020	8,662		−3.5%
U.S. Decennial Census

== Political districts ==
- Illinois's 12th congressional district
- State House District 117
- State Senate District 59

== Adjacent townships ==
- Ewing Township (north)
- Northern Township (northeast)
- Eastern Township (east)
- Cave Township (southeast)
- Frankfort Township (south)
- Denning Township (southwest)
- Browning Township (west)
- Browning Township (northwest)
