= Silkwood Inn =

- Silkwood Tavern
- Location within Illinois
- 37°58′51.492″N 89°6′57.2688″W
- Location: Mulkeytown, Illinois

History
- Built: 1827

Site notes
- Area: Tyrone Township, Franklin County, Illinois
- Architectural style: Log tavern
- Owner: Mulkeytown Area Historical Society

The Silkwood Inn is a historic building in Mulkeytown, Illinois.

== History ==
The Silkwood Inn, also known as the "Silkwood Tavern" as well as the "Half Way House" (due to its location approximately halfway between Shawneetown and Kaskaskia), was originally built by Barzilla (Basil) Silkwood, upon his arrival to Illinois from Kentucky, serving as an inn and tavern along the Old Shawneetown - Kaskaskia Trail that connected communities in Southern Illinois during the early 1800s.

The trail led from Old Shawneetown, Illinois (37°41′54″N 88°8′13″W - located along the Ohio River), to the original state capital of Illinois of Kaskaskia, Illinois (37°55′17″N 89°54′59″W).

=== Priscilla ===
While visiting a plantation in Georgia in the 1830s, Silkwood became acquainted with several slaves. Among them was a young girl named Priscilla. When the owner of the plantation died, the slaves were sold and Priscilla was bought by a Cherokee chief and taken to live on a reservation. When the Indians were moved from the reservation in 1838 along the Trail of Tears, they passed through Southern Illinois on their way to the Indian Territory. Once again, Silkwood's path intertwined with Priscilla's. Silkwood was in Jonesboro, Illinois for a business trip when the Indians moved through the area. He recognized Priscilla, and bought her for $1,000 in gold. Priscilla was taken to the inn, where she was accepted as a member of the family. She died in 1892 and was buried beside the Silkwoods in the Reid-Kirkpatrick Cemetery, about two miles northwest of the inn.

==== Hollyhocks ====
When Priscilla came to Southern Illinois, she brought some hollyhock seeds that she planted at her new home. The hollyhocks have continued to thrive in front of the inn, and are still known as the Priscilla hollyhocks.

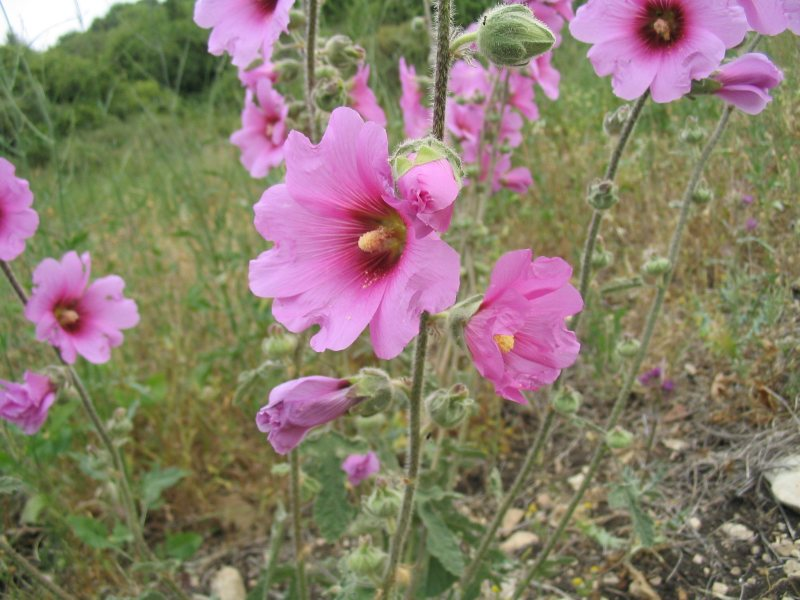
Alcea - Commonly known as Hollyhocks

=== Family home ===
The inn over time became the family home of John & Jean Crowe.

Around 1983, the inn (then the home to the Crowe family) was badly damaged by fire, and was almost demolished.

The Crowe family, upon learning of the deep historical significance of the structure to region, donated the building to the Mulkeytown Area Historical Society.

== Museum ==
The Mulkeytown Area Historical Society has restored the Silkwood Inn to its original exposed log structure. The interior is furnished with 19th-century period-correct items, either on loan or that have been donated to the Silkwood Inn.
