= North City, Illinois =

North City, Illinois Coello
- Village
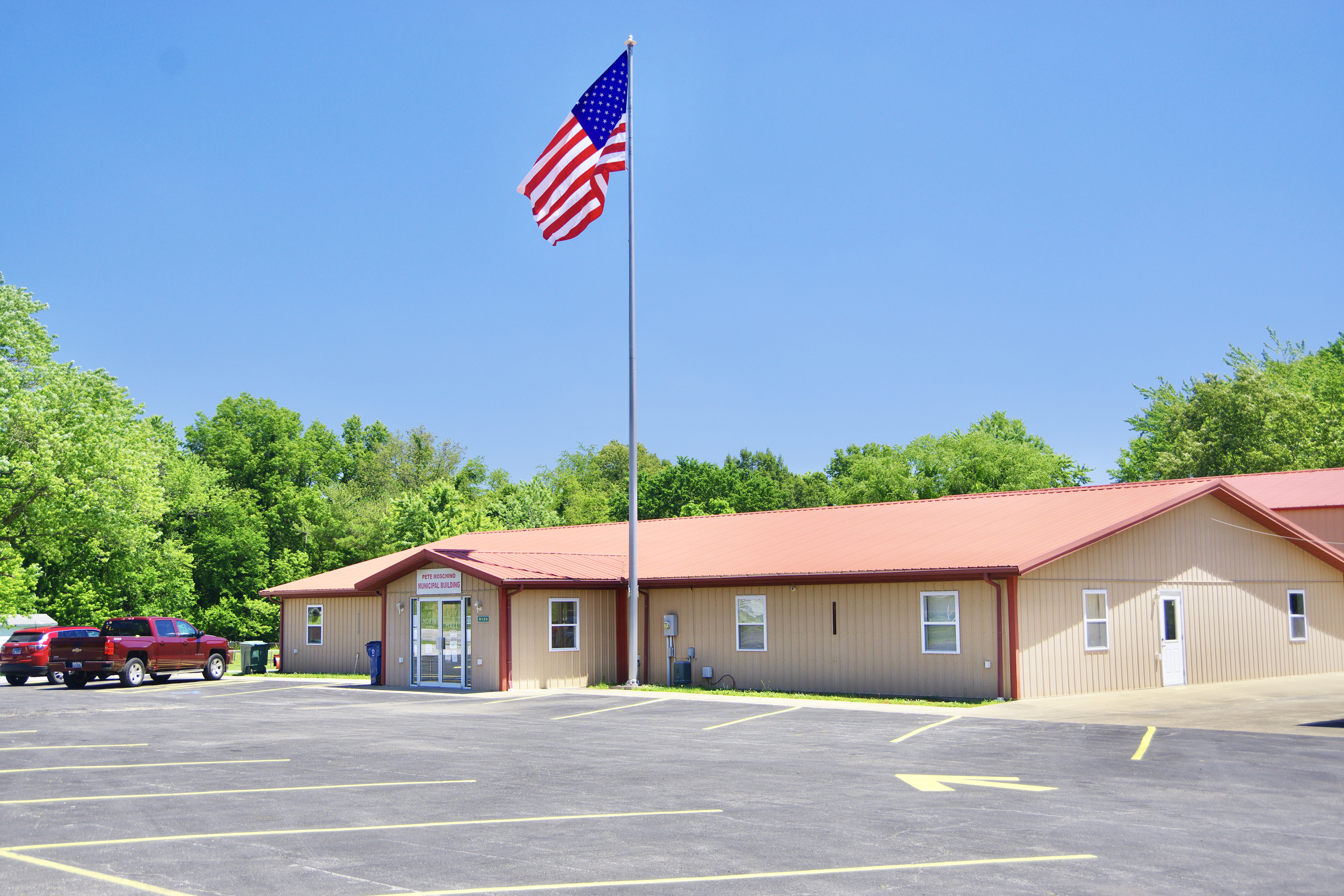
- Village Hall

- Location of North City in Franklin County, Illinois.
- Coordinates: 37°59′50″N 89°03′46″W
- Country: United States
- State: Illinois
- County: Franklin
- Township: Tyrone

Area
  - Total: 2.23 sq mi (5.77 km^{2})
  - Land: 2.17 sq mi (5.62 km^{2})
  - Water: 0.058 sq mi (0.15 km^{2})
- Elevation: 456 ft (139 m)

Population (2020)
  - Total: 509
  - Density: 234.5/sq mi (90.53/km^{2})
- Time zone: UTC-6 (CST)
  - Summer (DST): UTC-5 (CDT)
- ZIP code: 62825
- Area code: 618
- FIPS code: 17-53585
- GNIS feature ID: 2399513

North City is a village in Franklin County, Illinois, United States. As of the 2020 census, the population was 509. North City is also known as "Coello".

== History ==
North City incorporated in 1915. Its name comes from two nearby coal mines which were nicknamed "New North" and "Old North." A post office, known as "Coello" after its first postmaster, Pete Coello, opened in 1918. Both "North City" and "Coello" are commonly used in the village.

== Geography ==
North City is located in western Franklin County. It is bordered to the south by the city of Christopher. Illinois Route 148 passes through the eastern side of the village, leading north 2.5 miles (4.0 km) to Valier, north 7 miles (11 km) to Sesser, and south through Christopher 7 miles (11 km) to Zeigler. Illinois Route 14 runs just south of North City, leading east 7.5 miles (12.1 km) to Benton, the Franklin County seat, and west 12 miles (19 km) to Du Quoin.

According to the 2021 census gazetteer files, North City has a total area of 2.23 square miles (5.78 km^{2}), of which 2.17 square miles (5.62 km^{2}) (or 97.49%) is land and 0.06 square miles (0.16 km^{2}) (or 2.51%) is water.

== Demographics ==
Historical population
Census	Pop.	Note	%±
1920	1,362		—
1930	900		−33.9%
1940	601		−33.2%
1950	513		−14.6%
1960	362		−29.4%
1970	356		−1.7%
1980	404		13.5%
1990	538		33.2%
2000	630		17.1%
2010	608		−3.5%
2020	509		−16.3%
U.S. Decennial Census

As of the 2020 census there were 509 people, 312 households, and 192 families residing in the village. The population density was 228.56 inhabitants per square mile (88.25/km^{2}). There were 264 housing units at an average density of 118.55 per square mile (45.77/km^{2}). The racial makeup of the village was 92.73% White, 0.00% African American, 1.18% Native American, 0.39% Asian, 0.00% Pacific Islander, 0.20% from other races, and 5.50% from two or more races. Hispanic or Latino of any race were 0.59% of the population.

There were 312 households, out of which 14.7% had children under the age of 18 living with them, 55.13% were married couples living together, 5.77% had a female householder with no husband present, and 38.46% were non-families. 25.64% of all households were made up of individuals, and 7.05% had someone living alone who was 65 years of age or older. The average household size was 2.73 and the average family size was 2.19.

The village's age distribution consisted of 11.0% under the age of 18, 8.6% from 18 to 24, 13.5% from 25 to 44, 39.9% from 45 to 64, and 26.9% who were 65 years of age or older. The median age was 55.3 years. For every 100 females, there were 115.5 males. For every 100 females age 18 and over, there were 118.7 males.

The median income for a household in the village was $57,500, and the median income for a family was $70,714. Males had a median income of $36,250 versus $46,250 for females. The per capita income for the village was $32,945. About 4.7% of families and 12.3% of the population were below the poverty line, including 9.6% of those under age 18 and 4.3% of those age 65 or over.
