= Parrish, Illinois =

- Unincorporated community
- Location within Illinois Location within the United States
- Coordinates: 37°56′29″N 88°48′46″W
- Country: United States
- State: Illinois
- County: Franklin
- Elevation: 440 ft (130 m)
- Time zone: UTC-6 (Central (CST))
  - Summer (DST): UTC-5 (CDT)
- Area code: 618
- GNIS feature ID: 415418

Parrish is an unincorporated community in Cave Township, Franklin County, Illinois, United States. The community is located near Illinois Route 34 3.2 miles (5.1 km) west-northwest of Thompsonville.

== History ==
Once a larger town, Parrish was destroyed by the Tri-State Tornado in 1925. The town, which consisted of roughly 250 residents and 40 buildings at the time, suffered a 27% casualty rate and lost all but three of its buildings: one house, the Primitive Methodist Church, and the Parrish School. 22 people were killed and 90 percent of the town was destroyed. As the tornado destroyed all of the town's means of outside communication, the disaster was only discovered by a passing Illinois Central train, which returned to Thompsonville to notify the surrounding towns. Much of the town's surviving population moved away following the tornado, and the town never rebuilt its infrastructure; it is now a dispersed rural community.
