= Evansville Western Railway =

Railway line in the United States

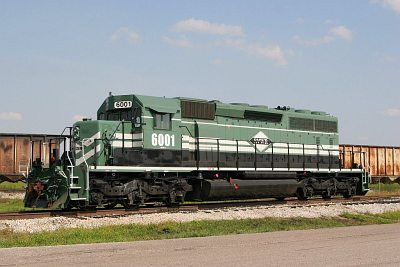
- Evansville Western SD40-2 #6001 at the Mount Vernon coal terminal in August 2006.

Overview
- Parent company: P&L Transportation
- Headquarters: Mount Vernon, Indiana
- Reporting mark: EVWR
- Locale: Southern Indiana, Southern Illinois
- Dates of operation: 2006–

Technical
- Track gauge: 4 ft 8 1/2 in (1,435 mm) standard gauge
- Length: 124.5 mi (200.4 km)

Other
- Website: evwr.com

The Evansville Western Railway (reporting mark EVWR) is a Class II (as of 2022) regional railroad operating in the southern Illinois and Indiana region. It is one of three regional railroad subsidiaries owned and operated by P&L Transportation.

== Overview ==
Founded in August 2005, the railroad commenced its first operations on January 1, 2006, when P&L Transportation, formerly Four Rivers Transportation, the parent company of both the Evansville Western and Paducah & Louisville railroads, leased 124.5 miles (200.4 km) of mainline track, ties and track equipment between CSX's Howell Yard in Evansville, Indiana, and the end-of-track at Okawville, Illinois, from CSX Transportation. This line was once part of the Louisville & Nashville's former Saint Louis Subdivision route that previously terminated in the metro-area of East St. Louis, Illinois, before being embargoed and slightly shortened under CSX ownership during the fall of 1993. CSX Transportation retains title to the real estate comprising the right of way on which the railroad operates, but has leased it to EVWR for an initial period of 20 years.

More than 55,000 to 60,000 carloads per year are shipped on the Evansville Western railway, all of which are interchanged with three different Class I railroad carriers. These are CSX Transportation at Howell Yard in Evansville, BNSF Railway at the Woodlawn, junction, and the Union Pacific at Mount Vernon. Construction has been completed on a new connection line east of Mount Vernon that permits interchange with the Norfolk Southern Railway, a fourth Class I railroad.

A new 14.6 mi (23.5 km) railroad line, known as the "Savatran Rail Spur", has been completed from Delafield (near McLeansboro) through Macedonia before terminating with a loading loop north of the Akin Junction on CN's existing Edgewood Cutoff line, thus giving the Evansville Western railroad interchange access to the Canadian National. Construction on this new line commenced during March 2009 and was originally scheduled to conclude by the following December. When the new spur connector was finished in January 2011 it allowed commodities traffic via connection with the CN and it began serving the new Sugar Camp Energy coal mine north of Akin that was developed by Williamson Energy Development, a subsidiary of West Virginia-based Cline Group, on reserves leased from Natural Resource Partners, L.P.

Additionally, EVWR constructed an interconnection line approximately 1.8 mi (2.9 km) in length just east of Mount Vernon that enabled interchange with the Norfolk Southern Railway (NS). The new line runs north from the EVWR mainline (about 0.25 mi (0.40 km) east of Liebengood Road) and connects with the NS across from and just southwest of the Mount Vernon Airport. EVWR also expanded its siding northwest of Opdyke to a total length of approximately 3 mi (4.8 km) from Interstate 64 to near the new connection allowing direct delivery of unit coal trains from the Sugar Camp Mine near Akin to the Gibson Generating Station in Indiana across the Wabash River from Mount Carmel, Illinois.

Most of the railroad's revenue freight services come from rail-barge transfer facilities, merchandise freight from bulk terminals, unit coal trains from coal mines and a riverside coal terminal, and grain and agricultural products from numerous grain elevator shippers.

== Equipment ==
The Evansville Western Railway's locomotive fleet primarily consists of rebuilt EMD hood units purchased from other railroads. They are all painted to match its parent company P&L Transportation's traditional green, white, & black color scheme with the classic diamond herald. In addition to the company-owned roster, the railroad is also leasing a few more units from GATX Corporation.

=== Company power ===
Model	Quantity	Acquired	Numbers
EMD GP38-2	3	2006	3833–3835
EMD GP39-2	2	2006	3836–3837
EMD GP38	2	2007	3838–3839
EMD GP40M-2	1	2008	3840
EMD SD40-2	3	2006	6001–6003
EMD SD60	1	2006	6004
EMD SD70MAC	7	2013	4501–4502, 4510–4511, 4517, 4519–4520

=== Leased power ===
Model	Quantity	Acquired	Numbers
EMD GP38-2	3	2006	GMTX 2622, 2651, & 2655
