= Northern Township =

Northern Township may refer to the following townships in the United States:

- Northern Township, Beltrami County, Minnesota
- Northern Township, Franklin County, Illinois

== See also ==
- Northern Liberties Township, Pennsylvania
