= Mulkeytown Christian Church =

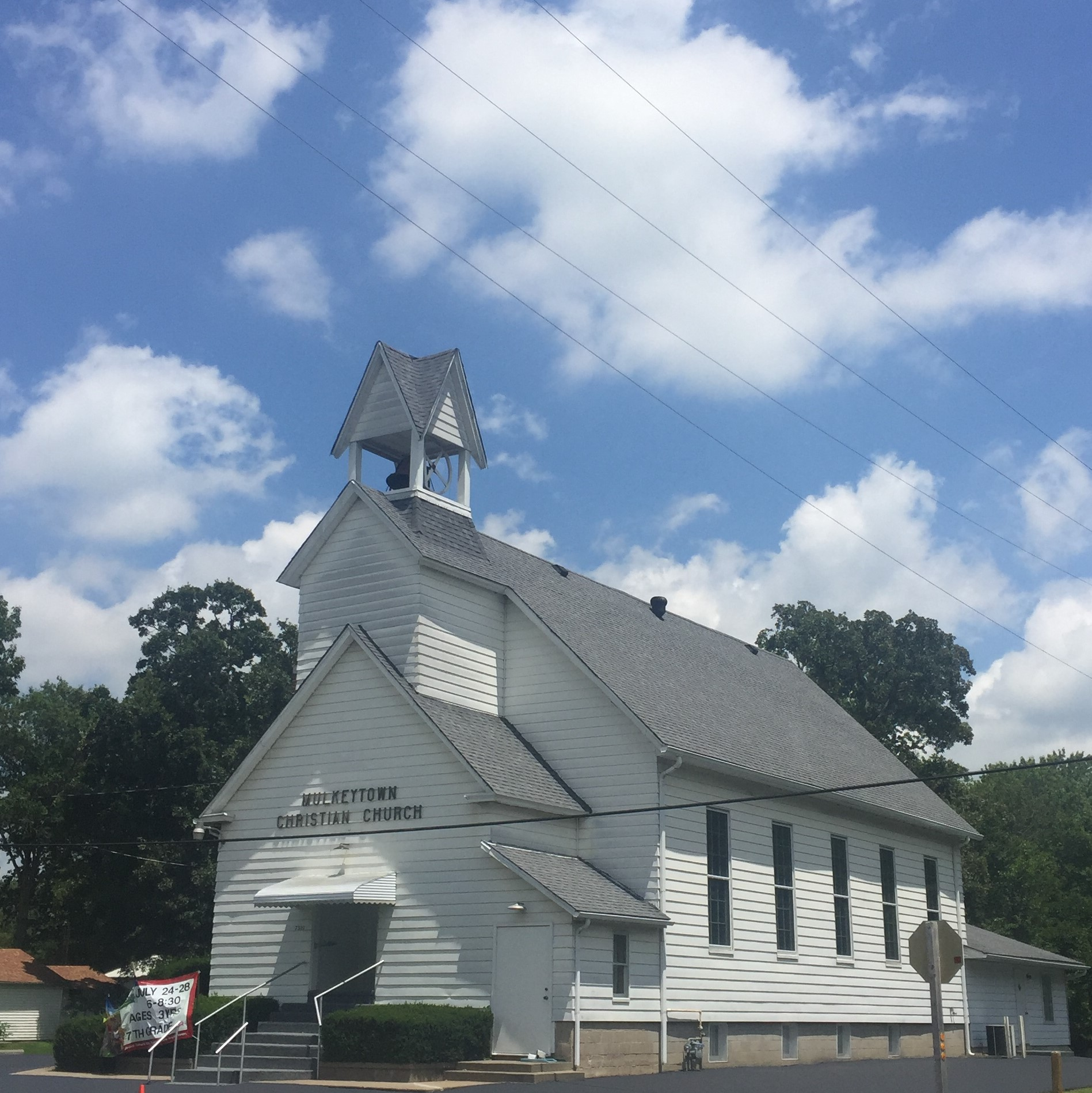

- Location of Mulkeytown Christian Church in Illinois
- 37°58′6.8124″N 89°6′41.6556″W
- Location: Illinois
- Country: United States
- Denomination: Christian

History
- Status: Active
- Founded: 1823
- Founder(s): John Mulkey & John Kirpatrick

Clergy
- Pastor: Kurt Jensen

Mulkeytown Christian Church located in the Southern Illinois town of Mulkeytown, within the county of Franklin, State of Illinois.

== History ==
Original congregation began to meet in the home of John Kirkpatrick in the year 1818, but the church organized only in 1823. Thus, the Mulkeytown Christian Church is the 4th oldest continuous congregation of the Christian Church in the State of Illinois.
