= Valier Patch, Illinois =

- Unincorporated community
- Location within Illinois Location within the United States
- Coordinates: 38°01′36″N 89°02′12″W
- Country: United States
- State: Illinois
- County: Franklin
- Township: Browning
- Elevation: 430 ft (130 m)
- Time zone: UTC-6 (Central (CST))
  - Summer (DST): UTC-5 (CDT)
- Area code: 618
- GNIS feature ID: 420196

Valier Patch is an unincorporated community in Franklin County, Illinois, United States. Valier Patch is 0.5 miles (0.80 km) north of Valier.
