= Shawneetown–Kaskaskia Trail =

The Kaskaskia–Shawneetown and Goshen Trail was developed from an 1816 appropriation of funds from the Congress of the United States. This trail served as an important link between the Ohio River town of Shawneetown across Southern Illinois, through the town of Mulkeytown to the then capital of Illinois in Kaskaskia.

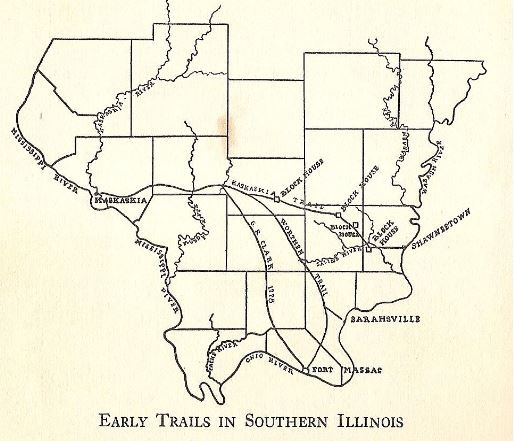
Illustration of historic trails through Southern Illinois. Including: G.R. Clark 1778 Trail, Worthen Trail, Kaskaskia Trail.

== Current day ==
A historical marker was placed at the location where the Kaskaskia–Shawneetown and Goshen Trails intersect, near Illinois Route 142 (IL 142) and Moore Road 37°47′56.0″N 88°24′55.1″W in Saline County.

The Silkwood Inn, located in Mulkeytown, Illinois, remains to this day in its original location, having been refurbished by the West Franklin Historical District & Genealogical Society to its original condition.
