= Hanaford, Illinois =

Hanaford, Illinois Logan
- Village
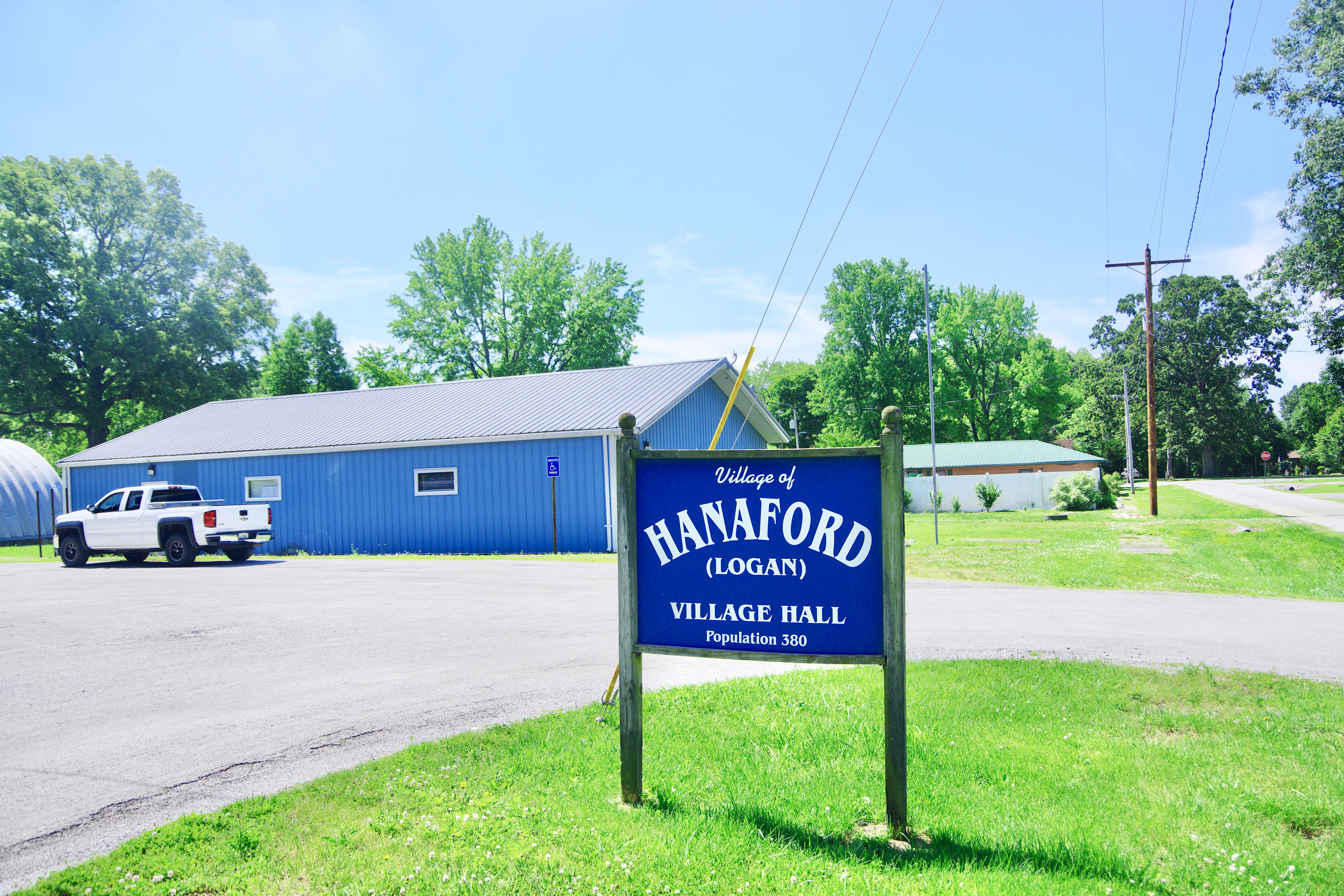
- Village Hall

- Location of Hanaford in Franklin County, Illinois.
- Coordinates: 37°57′29″N 88°50′08″W
- Country: United States
- State: Illinois
- County: Franklin
- Township: Benton

Area
  - Total: 1.02 sq mi (2.63 km^{2})
  - Land: 1.01 sq mi (2.61 km^{2})
  - Water: 0.0077 sq mi (0.02 km^{2})
- Elevation: 466 ft (142 m)

Population (2020)
  - Total: 320
  - Density: 317.5/sq mi (122.57/km^{2})
- Time zone: UTC-6 (CST)
  - Summer (DST): UTC-5 (CDT)
- ZIP code: 62856
- Area code: 618
- FIPS code: 17-32616
- GNIS feature ID: 2398237

Hanaford is a village in Franklin County, Illinois, United States. The population was 320 at the 2020 census. Hanaford is also known as Logan.

== History ==
Initially known as "Smothersville," Hanaford was renamed for land speculator John P. Hanaford. In 1916, the village was renamed "Logan" for the John A. Logan Coal Company, which operated a nearby mine. Since then, the names "Hanaford" and "Logan" have both been used by the village.

== Geography ==
Hanaford is located southeast of the center of Franklin County. Illinois Route 34 passes through the northeast corner of the village, leading northwest 6 miles (10 km) to Benton, the county seat, and southeast 5 miles (8 km) to Thompsonville.

According to the 2021 census gazetteer files, Hanaford has a total area of 1.01 square miles (2.62 km^{2}), of which 1.01 square miles (2.62 km^{2}) (or 99.41%) is land and 0.01 square miles (0.03 km^{2}) (or 0.59%) is water.

== Demographics ==
Historical population
Census	Pop.	Note	%±
1920	1,083		—
1930	617		−43.0%
1940	474		−23.2%
1950	280		−40.9%
1960	289		3.2%
1970	289		0.0%
1980	328		13.5%
1990	380		15.9%
2000	55		−85.5%
2010	327		494.5%
2020	320		−2.1%
U.S. Decennial Census

As of the 2020 census there were 320 people, 143 households, and 89 families residing in the village. The population density was 315.58 inhabitants per square mile (121.85/km^{2}). There were 151 housing units at an average density of 148.92 per square mile (57.50/km^{2}). The racial makeup of the village was 95.00% White, 0.00% African American, 0.00% Native American, 0.31% Asian, 0.00% Pacific Islander, 0.94% from other races, and 3.75% from two or more races. Hispanic or Latino of any race were 2.19% of the population.

There were 143 households, out of which 22.4% had children under the age of 18 living with them, 47.55% were married couples living together, 12.59% had a female householder with no husband present, and 37.76% were non-families. 32.17% of all households were made up of individuals, and 13.99% had someone living alone who was 65 years of age or older. The average household size was 2.73 and the average family size was 2.27.

The village's age distribution consisted of 24.0% under the age of 18, 6.5% from 18 to 24, 20% from 25 to 44, 29.2% from 45 to 64, and 20.3% who were 65 years of age or older. The median age was 44.8 years. For every 100 females, there were 76.6 males. For every 100 females age 18 and over, there were 79.0 males.

The median income for a household in the village was $47,250, and the median income for a family was $63,750. Males had a median income of $62,813 versus $23,750 for females. The per capita income for the village was $25,093. About 10.1% of families and 16.9% of the population were below the poverty line, including 27.8% of those under age 18 and 7.6% of those age 65 or over.
