= Deering City, Illinois =

- Unincorporated community
- Location within Illinois Location within the United States
- Coordinates: 37°54′59″N 88°53′31″W
- Country: United States
- State: Illinois
- County: Franklin
- Township: Frankfort
- Elevation: 390 ft (120 m)
- Time zone: UTC-6 (Central (CST))
  - Summer (DST): UTC-5 (CDT)
- Area code: 618
- GNIS feature ID: 407090

Deering City is an unincorporated community in Frankfort Township, Franklin County, Illinois, United States.
