= Six Mile Township, Franklin County, Illinois =

Six Mile Township
- Township
- Location in Franklin County

- Franklin County's location in Illinois
- Coordinates: 37°54′37″N 89°05′26″W
- Country: United States
- State: Illinois
- County: Franklin
- Established: November 4, 1884

Area
  - Total: 36.83 sq mi (95.4 km^{2})
  - Land: 36.14 sq mi (93.6 km^{2})
  - Water: 0.69 sq mi (1.8 km^{2}) 1.88%
- Elevation: 397 ft (121 m)

Population (2020)
  - Total: 3,536
  - Density: 97.84/sq mi (37.78/km^{2})
- Time zone: UTC-6 (CST)
  - Summer (DST): UTC-5 (CDT)
- ZIP codes: 62865, 62896, 62983, 62999
- FIPS code: 17-055-70070

Six Mile Township is one of twelve townships in Franklin County, Illinois, USA. As of the 2020 census, its population was 3,536 and it contained 1,710 housing units.

== Geography ==
According to the 2021 census gazetteer files, Six Mile Township has a total area of 36.83 square miles (95.39 km^{2}), of which 36.14 square miles (93.60 km^{2}) (or 98.12%) is land and 0.69 square miles (1.79 km^{2}) (or 1.88%) is water.

=== Cities, towns, villages ===
- Royalton
- Zeigler

=== Unincorporated towns ===
- Cleburne
- Mitchell
- New Bush

(This list is based on USGS data and may include former settlements.)

=== Cemeteries ===
The township contains these fourteen cemeteries: Browning, Butler, Dawson, Miners (Old), Miners (New), Moyers, Osage, Saint Aloysius, Saint Andrews, Saint Marys, Vaughn, Wells, Zeigler (Old), and Zeigler (New).

=== Major highways ===
- Illinois Route 148
- Illinois Route 149
- Illinois Route 184

=== Airports and landing strips ===
- Adams Airport

=== Lakes ===
- B And A Lake
- Hilyn Lake

== Demographics ==
As of the 2020 census there were 3,536 people, 1,544 households, and 983 families residing in the township. The population density was 96.01 inhabitants per square mile (37.07/km^{2}). There were 1,710 housing units at an average density of 46.43 per square mile (17.93/km^{2}). The racial makeup of the township was 93.98% White, 0.37% African American, 0.17% Native American, 0.17% Asian, 0.00% Pacific Islander, 0.74% from other races, and 4.58% from two or more races. Hispanic or Latino of any race were 1.44% of the population.

There were 1,544 households, out of which 23.10% had children under the age of 18 living with them, 45.34% were married couples living together, 11.98% had a female householder with no spouse present, and 36.33% were non-families. 30.20% of all households were made up of individuals, and 15.20% had someone living alone who was 65 years of age or older. The average household size was 2.40 and the average family size was 2.89.

The township's age distribution consisted of 19.3% under the age of 18, 6.9% from 18 to 24, 23.1% from 25 to 44, 29.6% from 45 to 64, and 21.2% who were 65 years of age or older. The median age was 45.9 years. For every 100 females, there were 99.7 males. For every 100 females age 18 and over, there were 100.7 males.

The median income for a household in the township was $46,164, and the median income for a family was $54,840. Males had a median income of $39,637 versus $21,555 for females. The per capita income for the township was $22,991. About 11.8% of families and 17.9% of the population were below the poverty line, including 27.0% of those under age 18 and 12.3% of those age 65 or over.

Historical population
Census	Pop.	Note	%±
2000	3,707		—
2010	3,885		4.8%
2020	3,536		−9.0%
U.S. Decennial Census

== School districts ==
- Zeigler-Royalton Community Unit School District 188

== Political districts ==
- Illinois' 12th congressional district
- State House District 117
- State Senate District 59
