= Cleburne, Illinois =

- Unincorporated community
- Location within Illinois Location within the United States
- Coordinates: 37°56′09″N 89°03′13″W
- Country: United States
- State: Illinois
- County: Franklin
- Elevation: 420 ft (130 m)
- Time zone: UTC-6 (Central (CST))
  - Summer (DST): UTC-5 (CDT)
- Area code: 618
- GNIS feature ID: 406237

Cleburne is an unincorporated community in Six Mile Township, Franklin County, Illinois, United States. The community is located along Illinois Route 148 2.5 miles (4.0 km) north of Zeigler.
