= Rend City, Illinois =

- Unincorporated community
- Location within Illinois Location within the United States
- Coordinates: 38°01′37″N 88°59′05″W
- Country: United States
- State: Illinois
- County: Franklin
- Elevation: 410 ft (120 m)
- Time zone: UTC-6 (Central (CST))
  - Summer (DST): UTC-5 (CDT)
- Area code: 618
- GNIS feature ID: 416523

Rend City is an unincorporated community in Browning Township, Franklin County, Illinois, United States. The community is located along County Route 9 4.1 miles (6.6 km) west-northwest of Benton.
