= New Harmony Toll Bridge =

Closed bridge across the Wabash River

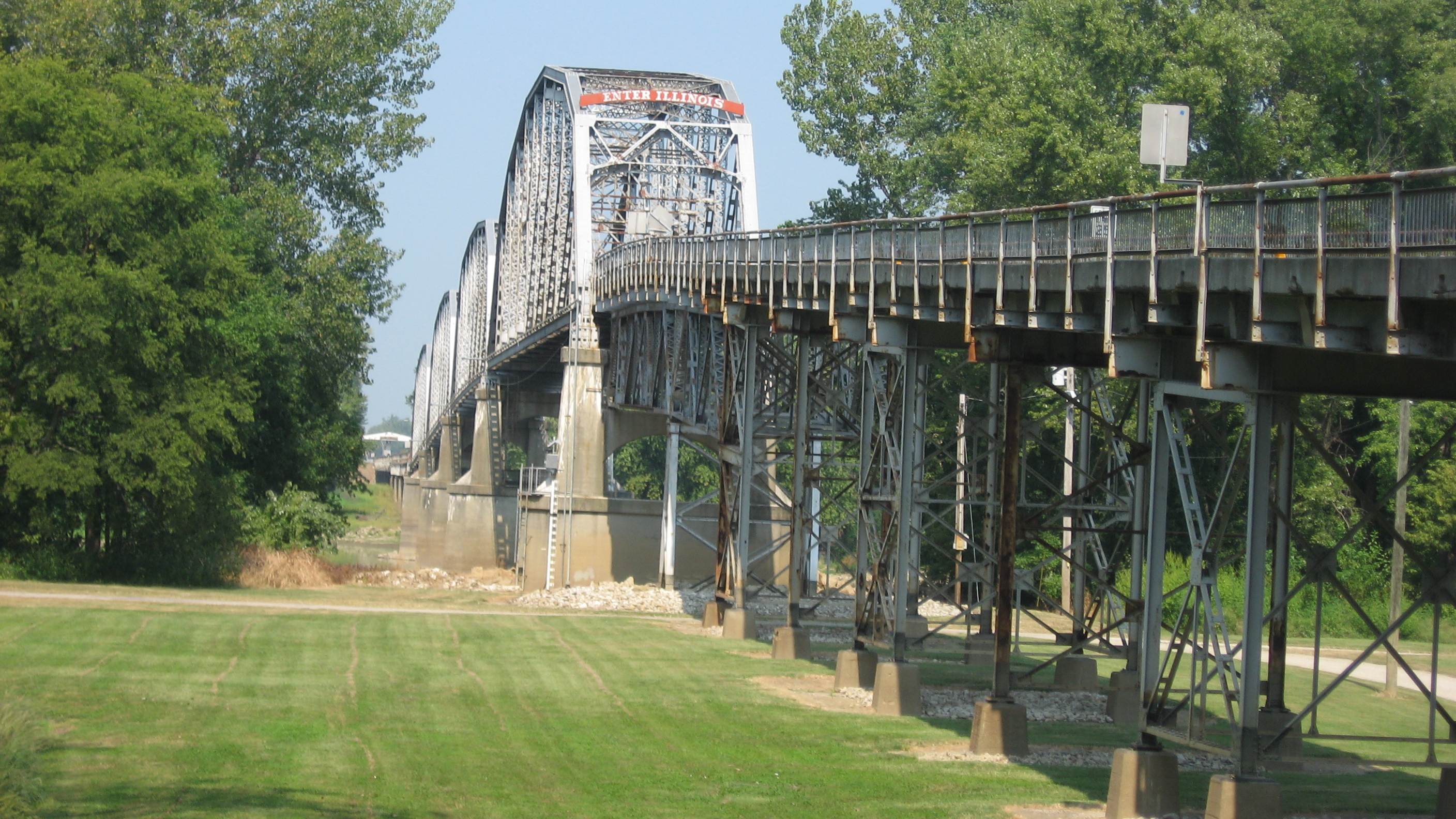
- Southern side of the Indiana end
- Coordinates: 38.13090°N 87.9415°W
- Carries: IL 14 / SR 66
- Crosses: Wabash River
- Locale: New Harmony, Indiana
- Maintained by: White County Bridge Commission

Characteristics
- Design: Riveted, Parker through truss
- Material: Steel
- Total length: 2,579 feet (786 m)
- Width: 20 feet (6.1 m)
- No. of spans: 47

History
- Opened: December 21, 1930
- Closed: May 21, 2012

Statistics
- Harmony Way Bridge
- U.S. National Register of Historic Places
- Architect: Parsons, Klapp, Brinckerhoff & Douglas
- NRHP reference No.: 07001030
- Added to NRHP: October 3, 2007

Location
- Interactive map of New Harmony Toll Bridge

The New Harmony Toll Bridge, also known as the Harmony Way Bridge, is a now-closed two-lane bridge across the Wabash River that connects Illinois Route 14 with Indiana State Road 66, which is Church Street in New Harmony, Indiana. The bridge links White County, Illinois with Posey County, Indiana and carried U.S. Route 460 from 1947 until 1974 when the highway was decommissioned in Illinois and Indiana. The four-span bridge is owned by the White County Bridge Commission and was built without federal funds in 1930 by the Big Wabash Bridge Company of Carmi, Illinois. The next bridge across the Wabash about 15 miles (24 km) downstream is the Wabash Memorial Bridge near Mount Vernon, Indiana and the next bridge upstream is for Interstate 64, which does not allow farm vehicles.

== Details ==
As originally designed, the bridge is 2,579 feet (0.49 of a mile) long. It has 47 spans and a 20 foot wide concrete roadway.

The bridge is the first highway bridge erected across the lower Wabash River and the oldest remaining bridge in use over the Wabash's length in Illinois and half of Indiana. The original owner was a private company, the Big Wabash Bridge Company of Carmi, Illinois, which was chartered by Congress to build and operate the bridge on May 1, 1928. The company contracted with the Nashville Bridge Company of Nashville, Tennessee to build it. The bridge opened on December 21, 1930, and 10,000 people attended the dedication of the bridge on December 30, 1930. In 1941, Congress created the White County Bridge Commission as a joint Illinois-Indiana agency to purchase the bridge from the Big Wabash Bridge Company for $895,000.

About 900 vehicles crossed the bridge each day. The bridge collected an average of $30,000 in monthly tolls and had $22,000 in monthly expenses. The bridge was placed on the National Register of Historic Places in 2007 in part because of its relationship to historic New Harmony, Indiana, as well as the bridge's age. The three-member commission was established by Congress on April 12, 1941, but Congress repealed the statute providing for an appointment mechanism in 1998. The commission's general manager, who is 75, speculated that the bridge would close if the three current commissioners would resign or die.

In 1951, the current toll booth on the western edge of the river was constructed by the Electronic Signal Company, to replace an earlier booth on the eastern edge. In 1952, a tollpayer sued to exercise his right to inspect the books and records of the commission, but lost his lawsuit and was not allowed access. In 1955, the General Accounting Office issued a report critical of the commission and claiming that one commissioner had a conflict of interest. In response, the U.S. Department of Justice filed a suit seeking the removal of the commissioner and recovery of the misapplied funds. However, the courts dismissed the case.

In 1994, the commission contracted to apply an epoxy coating on the bridge's surface, but the coating delaminated and the commission refused to pay the contractor claiming that the coating had not been applied correctly. After a trial, the commission lost the lawsuit and paid.

From September 2007 to April 2008, the bridge to closed to all traffic when cracks appeared in some of the concrete support piers. During the closure, contractors added new pilings to the existing piers and made other required repairs. In 2010, engineers determined that the bridge required an additional $6 million in repairs. The National Bridge Inventory rated the bridge "Structurally Deficient."

== Closure ==
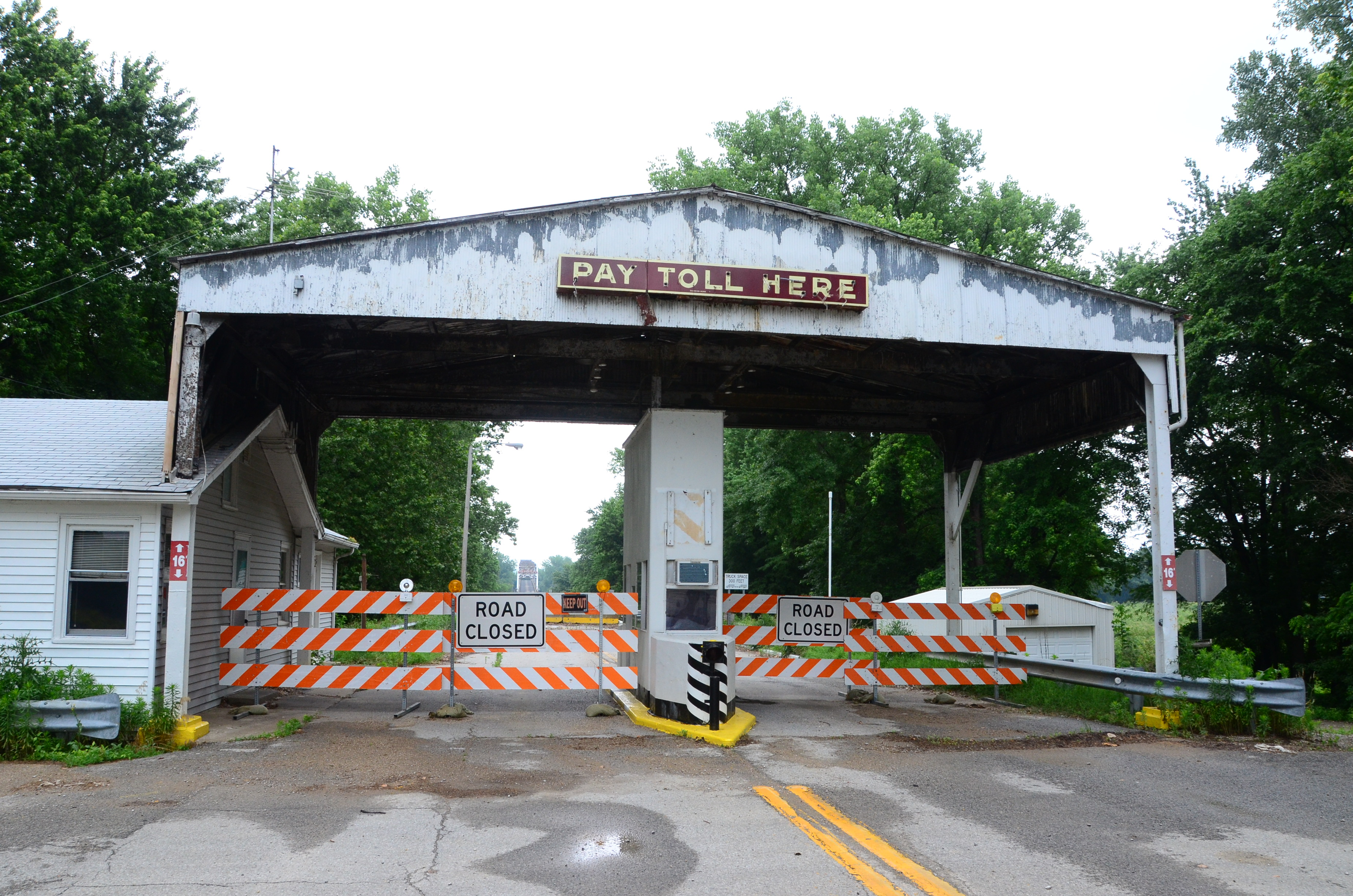
Toll booth at Illinois end, June 2013, one year after permanent closure

On May 21, 2012, it was announced that the bridge would close permanently at noon on May 29, 2012. White County Bridge Commission member Jim Clark stated, "the cost to make repairs was more than we could imagine." However, Clark then made the decision to close the bridge immediately after receiving the complete report from a team of nine engineers who inspected the bridge. "I knew it was bad, but didn't know just how bad until I received their full report by email Monday morning," Clark said. "Once I saw their weight-load calculations, I knew we had to shut it down right away. We couldn't wait until May 29." The thirteen toll booth employees were laid off. As of the closure there are $49,015 in toll tickets that have not been used. Refunds were given for thirty days from the closure. The closure of the New Harmony Bridge as reported in the Evansville Courier & Press would have a significant impact on farmers in the area and the oil industry. The bridge's closure increases the distance between New Harmony and Crossville, Illinois, by about ten miles.

The New Harmony Toll Bridge was identified as a top priority among the thousands of rural bridges in the United States worthy of repair in President Biden's “American Jobs Plan” proposed on March 31, 2021. The Bill must first be approved by The US Congress, including votes by Indiana's 8th Congressional District Representative Larry Bucshon and US Senators Todd Young and Mike Braun. All three subsequently voted against the final bill. On the Illinois side, Mary Miller of Illinois's 15th congressional district voted no, while Senators Dick Durbin and Tammy Duckworth voted yes.
