= Frisco, Illinois =

- Unincorporated community
- Location within Illinois Location within the United States
- Coordinates: 38°06′48″N 88°46′42″W
- Country: United States
- State: Illinois
- County: Franklin
- Township: Northern
- Elevation: 459 ft (140 m)
- Time zone: UTC-6 (Central (CST))
  - Summer (DST): UTC-5 (CDT)
- Area code: 618
- GNIS feature ID: 408768

Frisco is an unincorporated community in Franklin County, Illinois, United States. Frisco is 4.5 miles (7.2 km) northeast of Ewing.

== History ==
A post office operated from 1893 to 1903. The early settlement had a blacksmith, mill, school, a store that closed in the 1970s or 1980s, and a physician who lived in Frisco in the 1890s. The Frisco Missionary Baptist Church opened in 1902.

The Potter's Way Church is located in Frisco.
