= Steel City, Illinois =

- Unincorporated community
- Location within Illinois
- Coordinates: 37°59′53″N 088°52′45″W
- Country: United States
- State: Illinois
- County: Franklin
- Township: Benton
- Elevation: 430 ft (130 m)
- ZIP code: 62812
- GNIS feature ID: 419086

Steel City is an unincorporated community in Benton Township, Franklin County, Illinois, USA. It is located about a mile east of the county seat of Benton on Illinois Route 34.
