= Freeman Spur, Illinois =

- Village
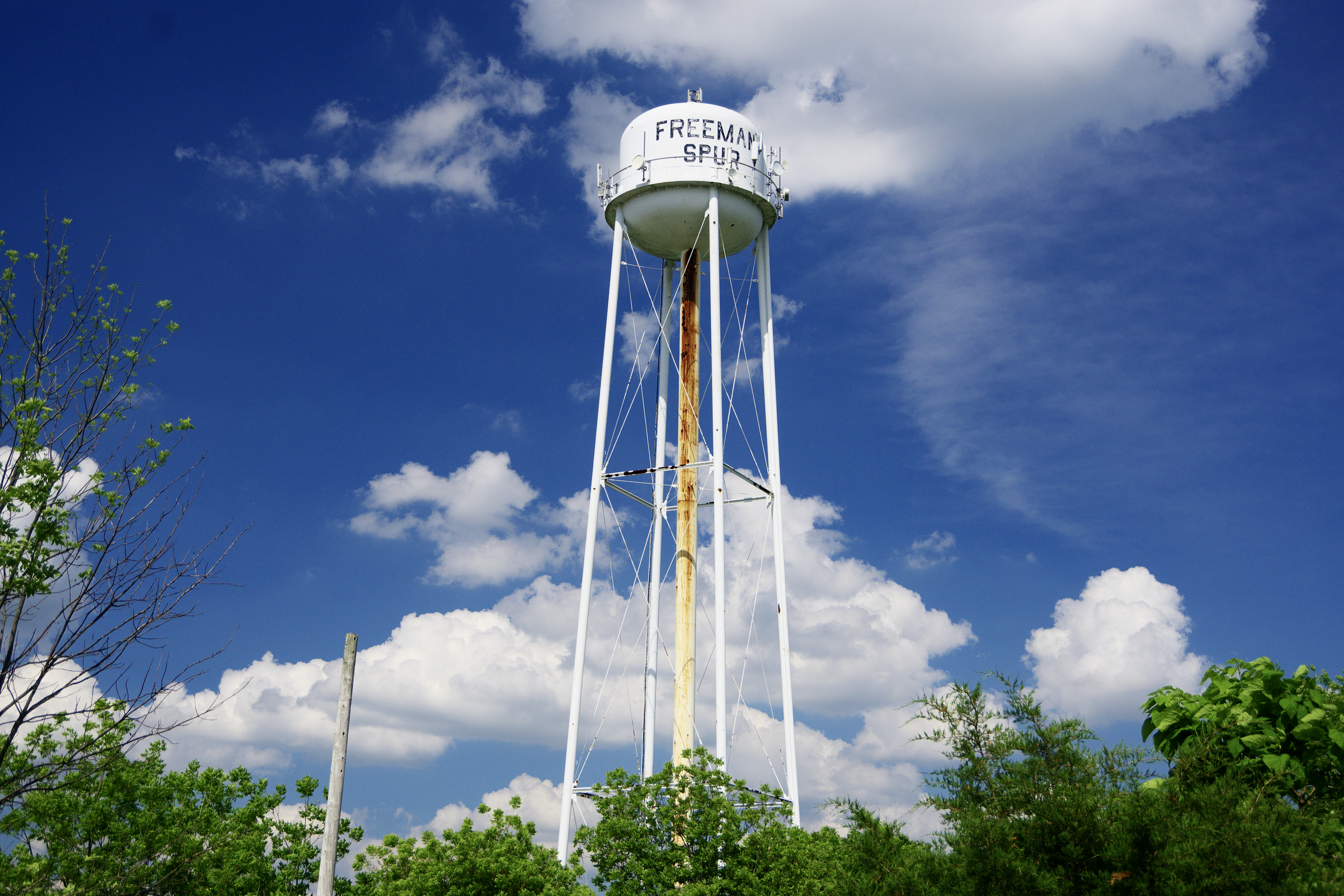
- Water tower

- Location of Freeman Spur in Williamson & Franklin Counties, Illinois.
- Coordinates: 37°51′45″N 89°00′06″W
- Country: United States
- State: Illinois
- Counties: Williamson, Franklin
- Townships: Denning, Herrin Precinct

Area
  - Total: 0.40 sq mi (1.04 km^{2})
  - Land: 0.40 sq mi (1.03 km^{2})
  - Water: 0.0039 sq mi (0.01 km^{2})
- Elevation: 390 ft (120 m)

Population (2020)
  - Total: 268
  - Density: 670.9/sq mi (259.04/km^{2})
- Time zone: UTC-6 (CST)
  - Summer (DST): UTC-5 (CDT)
- ZIP Code: 62841
- Area code: 618
- FIPS code: 17-27858
- GNIS feature ID: 2398925

Freeman Spur is a village in Williamson and Franklin Counties, Illinois, United States. The population was 268 at the 2020 census.

== History ==
Freeman Spur is rooted in several small communities that sprang up in the early 1900s with the opening of the Possum Ridge coal mine. These small communities voted to merge and incorporate as "Freeman Spur" in 1913. The village is named for James R. Freeman, who owned the land upon which the mine was located.

== Geography ==
According to the 2021 census gazetteer files, Freeman Spur has a total area of 0.40 square miles (1.04 km^{2}), of which 0.40 square miles (1.04 km^{2}) (or 99.25%) is land and 0.00 square miles (0.00 km^{2}) (or 0.75%) is water.

The shaft of the Possum Ridge Mine, which opened in 1908, is located at Freeman Spur. In 1912, a tornado destroyed above-ground structures at the mine.

== Demographics ==
Historical population
Census	Pop.	Note	%±
1920	325		—
1930	277		−14.8%
1940	258		−6.9%
1950	451		74.8%
1960	406		−10.0%
1970	363		−10.6%
1980	377		3.9%
1990	290		−23.1%
2000	273		−5.9%
2010	287		5.1%
2020	268		−6.6%
U.S. Census

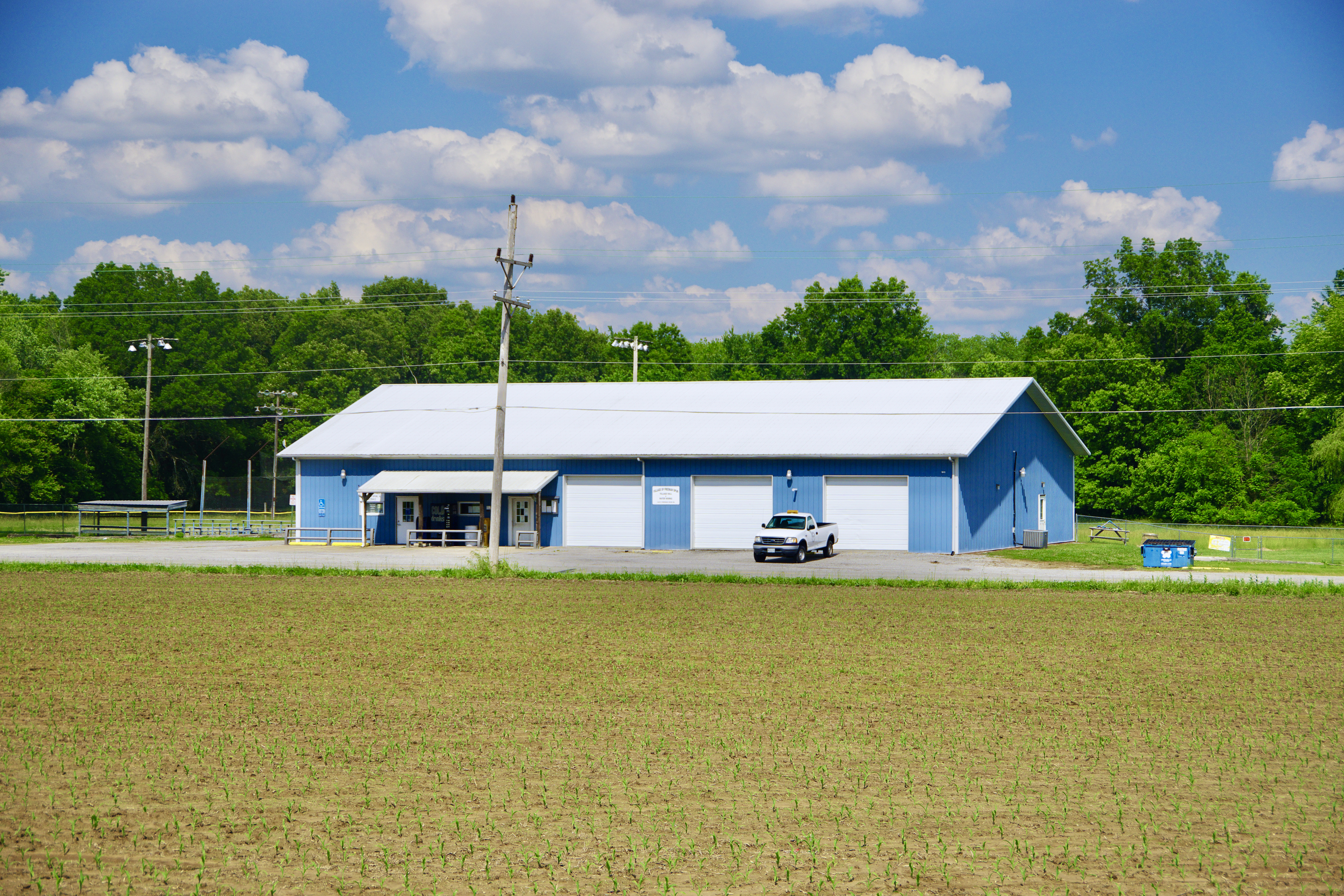
Freeman Spur Village Hall

As of the 2020 census there were 268 people, 88 households, and 58 families residing in the village. The population density was 666.67 inhabitants per square mile (257.40/km^{2}). There were 127 housing units at an average density of 315.92 per square mile (121.98/km^{2}). The racial makeup of the village was 88.06% White, 3.36% African American, 0.00% Native American, 0.00% Asian, 0.00% Pacific Islander, 1.12% from other races, and 7.46% from two or more races. Hispanic or Latino of any race were 0.75% of the population.

There were 88 households, out of which 26.1% had children under the age of 18 living with them, 43.18% were married couples living together, 9.09% had a female householder with no husband present, and 34.09% were non-families. 31.82% of all households were made up of individuals, and 25.00% had someone living alone who was 65 years of age or older. The average household size was 3.83 and the average family size was 3.06.

The village's age distribution consisted of 25.3% under the age of 18, 10.4% from 18 to 24, 17.4% from 25 to 44, 21.6% from 45 to 64, and 25.3% who were 65 years of age or older. The median age was 41.1 years. For every 100 females, there were 118.7 males. For every 100 females age 18 and over, there were 123.3 males.

The median income for a household in the village was $37,750, and the median income for a family was $39,250. Males had a median income of $24,063 versus $13,750 for females. The per capita income for the village was $14,086. About 37.9% of families and 44.6% of the population were below the poverty line, including 55.9% of those under age 18 and 20.6% of those age 65 or over.
