= Browning Township, Franklin County, Illinois =

Browning Township
- Township
- Location in Franklin County

- Franklin County's location in Illinois
- Coordinates: 37°59′25″N 88°58′58″W
- Country: United States
- State: Illinois
- County: Franklin
- Established: November 4, 1884

Area
  - Total: 36.48 sq mi (94.5 km^{2})
  - Land: 35.79 sq mi (92.7 km^{2})
  - Water: 0.69 sq mi (1.8 km^{2}) 1.90%
- Elevation: 381 ft (116 m)

Population (2020)
  - Total: 2,436
  - Density: 68.06/sq mi (26.28/km^{2})
- Time zone: UTC-6 (CST)
  - Summer (DST): UTC-5 (CDT)
- ZIP codes: 62812, 62819, 62822, 62865, 62884, 62891
- FIPS code: 17-055-08940

Browning Township is one of twelve townships in Franklin County, Illinois, USA. At the 2020 census, its population was 2,436 and it contained 1,161 housing units.

== Geography ==
According to the 2021 census gazetteer files, Browning Township has a total area of 36.48 square miles (94.48 km^{2}), of which 35.79 square miles (92.70 km^{2}) (or 98.10%) is land and 0.69 square miles (1.79 km^{2}) (or 1.90%) is water.

=== Cities, towns, villages ===
- Benton (west quarter)
- Buckner
- Christopher (east edge)
- Valier (east quarter)
- West City

=== Unincorporated towns ===
- Valier Patch
- Rend City

=== Extinct towns ===
- Hickory Corners

=== Cemeteries ===
The township contains eleven cemeteries. These are Browning, Grammer, Harrison, Hickory Corners, Knight, Moser, Mount Pleasant, Saint Joseph, Saint Marys, Smith and Wayman.

=== Major highways ===
- Interstate 57
- Illinois Route 14

=== Airports and landing strips ===
- Benton Municipal Airport

=== Landmarks ===
- Benton City Park

== Demographics ==
As of the 2020 census there were 2,436 people, 891 households, and 562 families residing in the township. The population density was 66.77 inhabitants per square mile (25.78/km^{2}). There were 1,161 housing units at an average density of 31.82 per square mile (12.29/km^{2}). The racial makeup of the township was 91.71% White, 0.49% African American, 0.33% Native American, 0.62% Asian, 0.00% Pacific Islander, 0.70% from other races, and 6.16% from two or more races. Hispanic or Latino of any race were 1.89% of the population.

There were 891 households, out of which 31.90% had children under the age of 18 living with them, 50.28% were married couples living together, 11.22% had a female householder with no spouse present, and 36.92% were non-families. 32.50% of all households were made up of individuals, and 17.80% had someone living alone who was 65 years of age or older. The average household size was 2.46 and the average family size was 3.03.

The township's age distribution consisted of 26.5% under the age of 18, 6.0% from 18 to 24, 27.1% from 25 to 44, 21.8% from 45 to 64, and 18.6% who were 65 years of age or older. The median age was 40.1 years. For every 100 females, there were 111.7 males. For every 100 females age 18 and over, there were 86.2 males.

The median income for a household in the township was $46,528, and the median income for a family was $61,625. Males had a median income of $43,871 versus $21,466 for females. The per capita income for the township was $22,970. About 14.1% of families and 19.2% of the population were below the poverty line, including 34.7% of those under age 18 and 7.9% of those age 65 or over.

Historical population
Census	Pop.	Note	%±
2000	2,385		—
2010	2,450		2.7%
2020	2,436		−0.6%
U.S. Decennial Census

== School districts ==
- Christopher Community Unit School District 99
- Sesser-Valier Community Unit School District 196

== Political districts ==
- Illinois' 12th congressional district
- State House District 117
- State Senate District 59
