= Akin, Illinois =

- Unincorporated community
- Location within Illinois Location within the United States
- Coordinates: 37°59′17″N 88°44′51″W
- Country: United States
- State: Illinois
- County: Franklin
- Township: Eastern
- Elevation: 472 ft (144 m)
- Time zone: UTC-6 (Central (CST))
  - Summer (DST): UTC-5 (CDT)
- Area code: 618
- GNIS feature ID: 403371

Akin (/ˈeɪkɪn/) is an unincorporated community in Eastern Township, Franklin County, Illinois, United States. Akin is 9.6 miles (15.4 km) east of Benton and 5.7 miles (9.2 km) north of Thompsonville. Akin had a post office, which closed on July 2, 2011.

== History ==
The post office had been in operation at Akin since 1860. George W. Aken, the first postmaster, most likely gave the community his name.
