= Orient, Illinois =

- City
- Location of Orient in Franklin County, Illinois.
- Coordinates: 37°55′03″N 88°58′38″W
- Country: United States
- State: Illinois
- County: Franklin
- Township: Denning

Area
  - Total: 0.75 sq mi (1.95 km^{2})
  - Land: 0.75 sq mi (1.93 km^{2})
  - Water: 0.0077 sq mi (0.02 km^{2})
- Elevation: 469 ft (143 m)

Population (2020)
  - Total: 327
  - Density: 439.1/sq mi (169.55/km^{2})
- Time zone: UTC-6 (CST)
  - Summer (DST): UTC-5 (CDT)
- ZIP code: 62874
- Area code: 618
- FIPS code: 17-56536
- GNIS feature ID: 2396077
- Website: www.orientillinois.com

Orient is a city in Franklin County, Illinois, United States. As of the 2020 census, the city population was 327.

== Geography ==
Orient is located in southern Franklin County 4 miles (6 km) northwest of West Frankfort.

According to the 2021 census gazetteer files, Orient has a total area of 0.75 square miles (1.94 km^{2}), of which 0.75 square miles (1.94 km^{2}) (or 99.07%) is land and 0.01 square miles (0.03 km^{2}) (or 0.93%) is water.

== Demographics ==
Historical population
Census	Pop.	Note	%±
1920	1,388		—
1930	1,267		−8.7%
1940	942		−25.7%
1950	801		−15.0%
1960	588		−26.6%
1970	502		−14.6%
1980	480		−4.4%
1990	428		−10.8%
2000	296		−30.8%
2010	358		20.9%
2020	327		−8.7%
U.S. Decennial Census

As of the 2020 census there were 327 people, 199 households, and 95 families residing in the city. The population density was 434.84 inhabitants per square mile (167.89/km^{2}). There were 174 housing units at an average density of 231.38 per square mile (89.34/km^{2}). The racial makeup of the city was 93.27% White, 0.00% African American, 0.92% Native American, 0.00% Asian, 0.00% Pacific Islander, 0.61% from other races, and 5.20% from two or more races. Hispanic or Latino of any race were 1.53% of the population.

There were 199 households, out of which 25.1% had children under the age of 18 living with them, 34.17% were married couples living together, 10.55% had a female householder with no husband present, and 52.26% were non-families. 41.21% of all households were made up of individuals, and 16.58% had someone living alone who was 65 years of age or older. The average household size was 3.09 and the average family size was 2.18.

The city's age distribution consisted of 17.5% under the age of 18, 3.9% from 18 to 24, 24.7% from 25 to 44, 35% from 45 to 64, and 18.9% who were 65 years of age or older. The median age was 46.2 years. For every 100 females, there were 115.9 males. For every 100 females age 18 and over, there were 102.3 males.

The median income for a household in the city was $35,234, and the median income for a family was $50,625. Males had a median income of $24,167 versus $30,865 for females. The per capita income for the city was $18,055. About 13.7% of families and 26.3% of the population were below the poverty line, including 28.2% of those under age 18 and 19.5% of those age 65 or over.
