= Pershing, Illinois =

- Unincorporated community
- Location within Illinois Location within the United States
- Coordinates: 37°52′48″N 88°57′55″W
- Country: United States
- State: Illinois
- County: Franklin
- Elevation: 400 ft (120 m)
- Time zone: UTC-6 (Central (CST))
  - Summer (DST): UTC-5 (CDT)
- Area code: 618
- GNIS feature ID: 415570

Pershing is an unincorporated community in Denning Township, Franklin County, Illinois, United States. The community is located along County Route 6 2.5 miles (4.0 km) west-southwest of West Frankfort.
