= Tyrone Township, Franklin County, Illinois =

Tyrone Township
- Township
- Location in Franklin County

- Franklin County's location in Illinois
- Coordinates: 37°59′34″N 89°05′34″W
- Country: United States
- State: Illinois
- County: Franklin
- Established: November 4, 1884

Area
  - Total: 35.81 sq mi (92.7 km^{2})
  - Land: 35.40 sq mi (91.7 km^{2})
  - Water: 0.41 sq mi (1.1 km^{2}) 1.15%
- Elevation: 469 ft (143 m)

Population (2020)
  - Total: 4,706
  - Density: 132.9/sq mi (51.33/km^{2})
- Time zone: UTC-6 (CST)
  - Summer (DST): UTC-5 (CDT)
- ZIP codes: 62812, 62822, 62825, 62865, 62891, 62983
- FIPS code: 17-055-76576

Tyrone Township is one of twelve townships in Franklin County, Illinois, USA. As of the 2020 census, its population was 4,706 and it contained 2,330 housing units.

== Geography ==
According to the 2021 census gazetteer files, Tyrone Township has a total area of 35.81 square miles (92.75 km^{2}), of which 35.40 square miles (91.69 km^{2}) (or 98.85%) is land and 0.41 square miles (1.06 km^{2}) (or 1.15%) is water.

=== Cities, towns, villages ===
- Christopher (vast majority)
- North City
- Valier (west three-quarters)

=== Unincorporated towns ===
- Mulkeytown
- Urbain

(This list is based on USGS data and may include former settlements.)

=== Cemeteries ===
The township contains these seven cemeteries: Cook, Greenwood, Mulkeytown, Naylor, Old Mulkeytown, Reed and Ward.

=== Major highways ===
- Illinois Route 14
- Illinois Route 148
- Illinois Route 184

=== Rivers ===
- Little Muddy River

=== Lakes ===
- Christopher Lake
- Izaac Walton Lake

== Demographics ==
As of the 2020 census there were 4,706 people, 2,139 households, and 1,256 families residing in the township. The population density was 131.42 inhabitants per square mile (50.74/km^{2}). There were 2,330 housing units at an average density of 65.07 per square mile (25.12/km^{2}). The racial makeup of the township was 94.94% White, 0.30% African American, 0.28% Native American, 0.11% Asian, 0.02% Pacific Islander, 0.28% from other races, and 4.08% from two or more races. Hispanic or Latino of any race were 0.85% of the population.

There were 2,139 households, out of which 22.70% had children under the age of 18 living with them, 44.55% were married couples living together, 8.27% had a female householder with no spouse present, and 41.28% were non-families. 35.80% of all households were made up of individuals, and 18.10% had someone living alone who was 65 years of age or older. The average household size was 2.29 and the average family size was 3.01.

The township's age distribution consisted of 21.5% under the age of 18, 5.3% from 18 to 24, 23.9% from 25 to 44, 27.1% from 45 to 64, and 22.1% who were 65 years of age or older. The median age was 43.5 years. For every 100 females, there were 89.4 males. For every 100 females age 18 and over, there were 90.9 males.

The median income for a household in the township was $39,245, and the median income for a family was $54,097. Males had a median income of $45,107 versus $22,132 for females. The per capita income for the township was $24,533. About 14.7% of families and 20.1% of the population were below the poverty line, including 27.1% of those under age 18 and 14.4% of those age 65 or over.

Historical population
Census	Pop.	Note	%±
2010	4,653		—
2020	4,706		1.1%
U.S. Decennial Census

== School districts ==
- Christopher Community Unit School District 99
- Sesser-Valier Community Unit School District 196

== Political districts ==
- Illinois' 12th congressional district
- State House District 117
- State Senate District 59

== Historical Information ==
According to "The Heritage of Franklin County Illinois" by Susie M. Ramsey and Flossie P. Miller (1964), "Tyrone Township was named after an old steamboat. The first land entries were made by Levi Silkwood and John Kirkpatrick in 1831, and John Mulkey in 1833." (Pg. 16, 1993 Print Shop reprint edition)
