= Illinois Route 184 =

State highway in Franklin County, Illinois, US

Illinois Route 184
- Main Street
- IL 184 highlighted in red

Route information
- Maintained by IDOT
- Length: 5.87 mi (9.45 km)
- Existed: 1924–present

Major junctions
- South end: IL 149 in Royalton
- North end: IL 14 in Mulkeytown

Location
- Country: United States
- State: Illinois
- Counties: Franklin

Highway system
- Illinois State Highway System; Interstate; US; State; Tollways; Scenic
← IL 180	→ IL 185

Illinois Route 184 is a 5.87-mile (9.45 km) state road in the southern portion of the U.S. state of Illinois located entirely within Franklin County. It runs from Illinois Route 149 in Royalton north to Illinois Route 14 in Mulkeytown. Route 184 is maintained by the Illinois Department of Transportation.

== Route description ==
Route 184 begins at an intersection with Route 149 in Six Mile Township north of Royalton. The route continues north through farmland, passing occasional buildings. It meets County Route 14 before intersecting County Route 30 at the border of Tyrone Township. Route 184 continues north to Mulkeytown, where it terminates at Illinois Route 14; the road continues northward as County Route 38. Route 184 is a two-lane surface road for its entire length.

== History ==
Route 184 was established in 1924 along its current route. It was first marked on the 1929 Illinois highway map.

== Major intersections ==
The entire route is in Franklin County.

Location	mi	km	Destinations	Notes
Six Mile Township	0.00	0.00	IL 149	Southern terminus
Mulkeytown	5.87	9.45	IL 14	Northern terminus
1.000 mi = 1.609 km; 1.000 km = 0.621 mi
