= Eastern Township, Franklin County, Illinois =

Eastern Township
- Township
- Location in Franklin County

- Franklin County's location in Illinois
- Coordinates: 37°59′47″N 88°45′40″W
- Country: United States
- State: Illinois
- County: Franklin
- Established: November 4, 1884

Area
  - Total: 36.23 sq mi (93.8 km^{2})
  - Land: 36.14 sq mi (93.6 km^{2})
  - Water: 0.09 sq mi (0.23 km^{2}) 0.25%
- Elevation: 453 ft (138 m)

Population (2020)
  - Total: 589
  - Density: 16.3/sq mi (6.29/km^{2})
- Time zone: UTC-6 (CST)
  - Summer (DST): UTC-5 (CDT)
- ZIP codes: 62812, 62860, 62890
- FIPS code: 17-055-21735

Eastern Township is one of twelve townships in Franklin County, Illinois. As of the 2020 census, its population was 589 and it contained 270 housing units.

== Geography ==
According to the 2021 census gazetteer files, Eastern Township has a total area of 36.23 square miles (93.84 km^{2}), of which 36.14 square miles (93.60 km^{2}) (or 99.75%) is land and 0.09 square miles (0.23 km^{2}) (or 0.25%) is water.

=== Unincorporated towns ===
- Akin
- Akin Junction
- Bessie
- Boothby

(This list is based on USGS data and may include former settlements.)

=== Cemeteries ===
The township contains these five cemeteries: Brady, Cook, Jones, Manion and Otterson.

=== Major highways ===
- Illinois Route 34

== Demographics ==
As of the 2020 census there were 589 people, 237 households, and 186 families residing in the township. The population density was 16.26 inhabitants per square mile (6.28/km^{2}). There were 270 housing units at an average density of 7.45 per square mile (2.88/km^{2}). The racial makeup of the township was 95.76% White, 0.34% African American, 0.17% Native American, 0.00% Asian, 0.00% Pacific Islander, 0.51% from other races, and 3.23% from two or more races. Hispanic or Latino of any race were 1.02% of the population.

There were 237 households, out of which 37.60% had children under the age of 18 living with them, 68.78% were married couples living together, 7.17% had a female householder with no spouse present, and 21.52% were non-families. 17.70% of all households were made up of individuals, and 13.90% had someone living alone who was 65 years of age or older. The average household size was 2.59 and the average family size was 2.92.

The township's age distribution consisted of 26.8% under the age of 18, 2.6% from 18 to 24, 37.9% from 25 to 44, 16.3% from 45 to 64, and 16.3% who were 65 years of age or older. The median age was 38.6 years. For every 100 females, there were 115.1 males. For every 100 females age 18 and over, there were 118.0 males.

The median income for a household in the township was $43,854, and the median income for a family was $59,375. Males had a median income of $53,750 versus $34,444 for females. The per capita income for the township was $24,496. About 18.3% of families and 15.1% of the population were below the poverty line, including 3.8% of those under age 18 and 8.0% of those age 65 or over.

Historical population
Census	Pop.	Note	%±
2000	528		—
2010	582		10.2%
2020	589		1.2%
U.S. Decennial Census

== School districts ==
- Hamilton County Community Unit School District 10

== Political representation ==
- Illinois's 12th congressional district
- State House District 117
- State Senate District 59
