= Northern Township, Franklin County, Illinois =

Northern Township
- Township
- Location in Franklin County

- Franklin County's location in Illinois
- Coordinates: 38°05′07″N 88°45′31″W
- Country: United States
- State: Illinois
- County: Franklin
- Established: November 4, 1884

Area
  - Total: 36.59 sq mi (94.8 km^{2})
  - Land: 36.47 sq mi (94.5 km^{2})
  - Water: 0.12 sq mi (0.31 km^{2}) 0.31%
- Elevation: 490 ft (150 m)

Population (2020)
  - Total: 456
  - Density: 12.5/sq mi (4.83/km^{2})
- Time zone: UTC-6 (CST)
  - Summer (DST): UTC-5 (CDT)
- ZIP codes: 62836, 62860
- FIPS code: 17-055-53637

Northern Township is one of twelve townships in Franklin County, Illinois, USA. As of the 2020 census, its population was 456 and it contained 192 housing units.

== Geography ==
According to the 2021 census gazetteer files, Northern Township has a total area of 36.59 square miles (94.77 km^{2}), of which 36.47 square miles (94.46 km^{2}) (or 99.69%) is land and 0.12 square miles (0.31 km^{2}) (or 0.31%) is water.

=== Cities, towns, villages ===
- Macedonia (west half)

=== Unincorporated towns ===
- Diana
- Frisco
- Taylor Hill

(This list is based on USGS data and may include former settlements.)

=== Cemeteries ===
The township contains these five cemeteries: Gilgal, Jacksonville, Macedonia, Middle Fork, Smith and Walnut Grove.

=== Major highways ===
- Illinois Route 14

== Demographics ==
As of the 2020 census there were 456 people, 210 households, and 129 families residing in the township. The population density was 12.46 inhabitants per square mile (4.81/km^{2}). There were 192 housing units at an average density of 5.25 per square mile (2.03/km^{2}). The racial makeup of the township was 94.74% White, 0.66% African American, 0.00% Native American, 0.00% Asian, 0.00% Pacific Islander, 0.22% from other races, and 4.39% from two or more races. Hispanic or Latino of any race were 0.66% of the population.

There were 210 households, out of which 32.40% had children under the age of 18 living with them, 59.52% were married couples living together, 1.90% had a female householder with no spouse present, and 38.57% were non-families. 37.60% of all households were made up of individuals, and 24.30% had someone living alone who was 65 years of age or older. The average household size was 2.33 and the average family size was 3.15.

The township's age distribution consisted of 24.1% under the age of 18, 5.5% from 18 to 24, 26.3% from 25 to 44, 22.9% from 45 to 64, and 21.1% who were 65 years of age or older. The median age was 39.8 years. For every 100 females, there were 148.2 males. For every 100 females age 18 and over, there were 133.3 males.

The median income for a household in the township was $80,000, and the median income for a family was $100,694. Males had a median income of $53,512 versus $31,827 for females. The per capita income for the township was $34,939. About 1.6% of families and 1.8% of the population were below the poverty line, including 0.0% of those under age 18 and 5.8% of those age 65 or over.

Historical population
| Census | Pop. | Note | %± |
|---|---|---|---|
| 2010 | 476 | | — |
| 2020 | 456 | | −4.2% |
U.S. Decennial Census

== School districts ==
Ewing Northern CCSD #115

Benton Consolidated High School #103

== Political districts ==
- Illinois' 12th congressional district
- State House District 117
- State Senate District 59
