= Denning Township, Franklin County, Illinois =

Denning Township
- Township
- Location in Franklin County

- Franklin County's location in Illinois
- Coordinates: 37°54′29″N 88°59′03″W
- Country: United States
- State: Illinois
- County: Franklin
- Established: November 4, 1884

Area
  - Total: 36.99 sq mi (95.8 km^{2})
  - Land: 35.85 sq mi (92.9 km^{2})
  - Water: 1.14 sq mi (3.0 km^{2}) 3.09%
- Elevation: 387 ft (118 m)

Population (2020)
  - Total: 4,729
  - Density: 131.9/sq mi (50.93/km^{2})
- Time zone: UTC-6 (CST)
  - Summer (DST): UTC-5 (CDT)
- ZIP codes: 62812, 62865, 62874, 62896
- FIPS code: 17-055-19421

Denning Township is one of twelve townships in Franklin County, Illinois, USA. As of the 2020 census, its population was 4,729 and it contained 2,352 housing units.

== Geography ==
According to the 2021 census gazetteer files, Denning Township has a total area of 36.99 square miles (95.80 km^{2}), of which 35.85 square miles (92.85 km^{2}) (or 96.91%) is land and 1.14 square miles (2.95 km^{2}) (or 3.09%) is water.

=== Cities, towns, villages ===
- Freeman Spur (north half)
- Orient
- West Frankfort (west half)

=== Unincorporated towns ===
- Cambon
- Lake Creek
- Pershing
- Plumfield

(This list is based on USGS data and may include former settlements.)

=== Cemeteries ===
The township contains these four cemeteries: Denning, Follis, Hanes and Rose.

=== Major highways ===
- Interstate 57
- Illinois Route 149
- Illinois Route 37

=== Lakes ===
- Beaver Lake
- Cambon Lake

== Demographics ==
As of the 2020 census there were 4,729 people, 2,097 households, and 1,165 families residing in the township. The population density was 127.85 inhabitants per square mile (49.36/km^{2}). There were 2,352 housing units at an average density of 63.58 per square mile (24.55/km^{2}). The racial makeup of the township was 93.40% White, 0.42% African American, 0.36% Native American, 0.30% Asian, 0.00% Pacific Islander, 0.42% from other races, and 5.10% from two or more races. Hispanic or Latino of any race were 1.29% of the population.

There were 2,097 households, out of which 29.00% had children under the age of 18 living with them, 37.05% were married couples living together, 12.54% had a female householder with no spouse present, and 44.44% were non-families. 39.40% of all households were made up of individuals, and 20.60% had someone living alone who was 65 years of age or older. The average household size was 2.37 and the average family size was 3.12.

The township's age distribution consisted of 23.3% under the age of 18, 8.5% from 18 to 24, 20.9% from 25 to 44, 29.2% from 45 to 64, and 18.0% who were 65 years of age or older. The median age was 43.4 years. For every 100 females, there were 105.4 males. For every 100 females age 18 and over, there were 85.8 males.

The median income for a household in the township was $31,048, and the median income for a family was $43,542. Males had a median income of $38,676 versus $19,444 for females. The per capita income for the township was $20,283. About 22.7% of families and 24.7% of the population were below the poverty line, including 30.2% of those under age 18 and 26.1% of those age 65 or over.

Historical population
| Census | Pop. | Note | %± |
|---|---|---|---|
| 2000 | 5,075 | | — |
| 2010 | 5,202 | | 2.5% |
| 2020 | 4,729 | | −9.1% |
U.S. Decennial Census

== School districts ==
- Frankfort Community Unit School District 168
- Herrin Community Unit School District 4
- Zeigler-Royalton Community Unit School District 188

== Political districts ==
- Illinois' 12th congressional district
- State House District 117
- State Senate District 59
