= Frankfort Township, Franklin County, Illinois =

Frankfort Township
- Township
- Location in Franklin County

- Franklin County's location in Illinois
- Coordinates: 37°54′07″N 88°52′09″W
- Country: United States
- State: Illinois
- County: Franklin
- Established: November 4, 1884

Area
  - Total: 36.91 sq mi (95.6 km^{2})
  - Land: 36.47 sq mi (94.5 km^{2})
  - Water: 0.45 sq mi (1.2 km^{2}) 1.21%
- Elevation: 387 ft (118 m)

Population (2020)
  - Total: 6,443
  - Density: 176.7/sq mi (68.21/km^{2})
- Time zone: UTC-6 (CST)
  - Summer (DST): UTC-5 (CDT)
- ZIP codes: 62812, 62890, 62896
- FIPS code: 17-055-27611

Frankfort Township is one of twelve townships in Franklin County, Illinois, USA. As of the 2020 census, its population was 6,443 and it contained 3,256 housing units.

== Geography ==
According to the 2021 census gazetteer files, Frankfort Township has a total area of 36.91 square miles (95.60 km^{2}), of which 36.47 square miles (94.46 km^{2}) (or 98.79%) is land and 0.45 square miles (1.17 km^{2}) (or 1.21%) is water.

=== Cities, towns, villages ===
- West Frankfort (east half)

=== Unincorporated towns ===
- Deering City
- Frankfort

(This list is based on USGS data and may include former settlements.)

=== Extinct towns ===
- Greenville

=== Cemeteries ===
The township contains these thirteen cemeteries: Bonner, Clayton, County, Crawford, Joplin, Lithuanian, Melvin, Neal, Neal, Oddfellow, Saint Johns, Tower Heights and Trinity.

=== Major highways ===
- Illinois Route 149

=== Landmarks ===
- Frankfort Community Park

== Demographics ==
As of the 2020 census there were 6,443 people, 2,825 households, and 1,835 families residing in the township. The population density was 174.56 inhabitants per square mile (67.40/km^{2}). There were 3,256 housing units at an average density of 88.21 per square mile (34.06/km^{2}). The racial makeup of the township was 93.00% White, 0.74% African American, 0.40% Native American, 0.47% Asian, 0.05% Pacific Islander, 0.51% from other races, and 4.83% from two or more races. Hispanic or Latino of any race were 2.11% of the population.

There were 2,825 households, out of which 30.60% had children under the age of 18 living with them, 43.82% were married couples living together, 17.56% had a female householder with no spouse present, and 35.04% were non-families. 31.10% of all households were made up of individuals, and 18.00% had someone living alone who was 65 years of age or older. The average household size was 2.37 and the average family size was 2.96.

The township's age distribution consisted of 21.8% under the age of 18, 7.6% from 18 to 24, 24.1% from 25 to 44, 26.5% from 45 to 64, and 20.0% who were 65 years of age or older. The median age was 41.9 years. For every 100 females, there were 92.3 males. For every 100 females age 18 and over, there were 92.3 males.

The median income for a household in the township was $41,235, and the median income for a family was $50,098. Males had a median income of $39,808 versus $22,326 for females. The per capita income for the township was $22,173. About 21.6% of families and 26.3% of the population were below the poverty line, including 37.1% of those under age 18 and 17.6% of those age 65 or over.

Historical population
Census	Pop.	Note	%±
2000	7,137		—
2010	7,029		−1.5%
2020	6,443		−8.3%
U.S. Decennial Census

== School districts ==
- Frankfort Community Unit School District 168

== Political districts ==
- Illinois' 12th congressional district
- State House District 117
- State Senate District 59
