= Cave Township, Franklin County, Illinois =

Cave Township
- Township
- Location in Franklin County

- Franklin County's location in Illinois
- Coordinates: 37°54′24″N 88°45′27″W
- Country: United States
- State: Illinois
- County: Franklin
- Established: November 4, 1884

Area
  - Total: 36.51 sq mi (94.6 km^{2})
  - Land: 35.76 sq mi (92.6 km^{2})
  - Water: 0.75 sq mi (1.9 km^{2}) 2.05%
- Elevation: 476 ft (145 m)

Population (2020)
  - Total: 1,683
  - Density: 47.06/sq mi (18.17/km^{2})
- Time zone: UTC-6 (CST)
  - Summer (DST): UTC-5 (CDT)
- ZIP codes: 62890, 62896
- FIPS code: 17-055-11813

Cave Township is one of twelve townships in Franklin County, Illinois, USA. As of the 2020 census, its population was 1,683 and it contained 828 housing units.

== Geography ==
According to the 2021 census gazetteer files, Cave Township has a total area of 36.51 square miles (94.56 km^{2}), of which 35.76 square miles (92.62 km^{2}) (or 97.95%) is land and 0.75 square miles (1.94 km^{2}) (or 2.05%) is water.

=== Cities, towns, villages ===
- Thompsonville

=== Unincorporated towns ===
- Parrish

=== Extinct towns ===
- Ferber
- Kegley
- Locust Grove

=== Cemeteries ===
The township contains these six cemeteries: Carter's Temple, Clem, Downs, Eubanks, Isaacs, and Smothers.

=== Major highways ===
- Illinois Route 34
- Illinois Route 149

=== Lakes ===
- Thompsonville Lake
- West Frankfort City Lake

== Demographics ==
As of the 2020 census there were 1,683 people, 766 households, and 466 families residing in the township. The population density was 46.10 inhabitants per square mile (17.80/km^{2}). There were 828 housing units at an average density of 22.68 per square mile (8.76/km^{2}). The racial makeup of the township was 95.90% White, 0.59% African American, 0.18% Native American, 0.06% Asian, 0.00% Pacific Islander, 0.48% from other races, and 2.79% from two or more races. Hispanic or Latino of any race were 0.59% of the population.

There were 766 households, out of which 22.20% had children under the age of 18 living with them, 51.17% were married couples living together, 7.05% had a female householder with no spouse present, and 39.16% were non-families. 34.20% of all households were made up of individuals, and 22.20% had someone living alone who was 65 years of age or older. The average household size was 2.24 and the average family size was 2.86.

The township's age distribution consisted of 20.2% under the age of 18, 8.3% from 18 to 24, 16.7% from 25 to 44, 26.9% from 45 to 64, and 27.9% who were 65 years of age or older. The median age was 49.3 years. For every 100 females, there were 82.7 males. For every 100 females age 18 and over, there were 91.2 males.

The median income for a household in the township was $47,500, and the median income for a family was $64,583. Males had a median income of $45,240 versus $20,441 for females. The per capita income for the township was $24,126. About 10.7% of families and 18.4% of the population were below the poverty line, including 31.1% of those under age 18 and 12.3% of those age 65 or over.

Historical population
Census	Pop.	Note	%±
2000	1,589		—
2010	1,756		10.5%
2020	1,683		−4.2%
U.S. Decennial Census

== Political districts ==
- Illinois' 12th congressional district
- State House District 117
- State Senate District 59
