= Mulkeytown, Illinois =

- Census-designated place
- Location within Illinois
- Coordinates: 37°58′20″N 89°06′40″W
- Country: United States
- State: Illinois
- County: Franklin
- Township: Tyrone

Area
  - Total: 0.27 sq mi (0.71 km^{2})
  - Land: 0.27 sq mi (0.71 km^{2})
  - Water: 0 sq mi (0.00 km^{2})
- Elevation: 453 ft (138 m)

Population (2020)
  - Total: 162
  - Density: 588.8/sq mi (227.33/km^{2})
- Time zone: UTC-6 (Central (CST))
  - Summer (DST): UTC-5 (CDT)
- ZIP code: 62865
- Area code: 618
- GNIS feature ID: 2628555

Mulkeytown is an unincorporated community and census-designated place (CDP) in Franklin County, Illinois, United States. As of the 2020 census it had a population of 162.

== History ==
Mulkeytown is named for preacher John Mulkey and his family; Mulkey founded the Mulkeytown Christian Church, the oldest in the community, in 1818.

=== Centennial and sesquicentennial farms ===
Centennial and sesquicentennial farms are those family farms that have been held within a family for more than 100 or 150 years.

- Davis - 1848
- Greenwood - 1854
- Berner - 1871

== Geography ==
Mulkeytown is located 309 miles (497 km) south of Chicago (via I-57 south to IL 14 west), and 95 miles (153 km) southeast of St. Louis (via I-64 east to US 51 south to IL 14 east).

Mulkeytown is located on Illinois Route 184, 3 miles (5 km) west of Christopher, in Tyrone Township, in the west-central portion of Franklin County.

According to the 2021 census gazetteer files, Mulkeytown has a total area of 0.28 square miles (0.73 km^{2}), of which 0.28 square miles (0.73 km^{2}) (or 99.64%) is land and 0.00 square miles (0.00 km^{2}) (or 0.36%) is water.

== Demographics ==
Historical population
Census	Pop.	Note	%±
2010	175		—
2020	162		−7.4%
U.S. Decennial Census

As of the 2020 census there were 162 people, 51 households, and 25 families residing in the CDP. The population density was 586.96 inhabitants per square mile (226.63/km^{2}). There were 87 housing units at an average density of 315.22 per square mile (121.71/km^{2}). The racial makeup of the CDP was 96.91% White, 0.00% African American, 0.00% Native American, 0.00% Asian, 0.62% Pacific Islander, 0.62% from other races, and 1.85% from two or more races. Hispanic or Latino of any race were 0.62% of the population.

There were 51 households, out of which 17.6% had children under the age of 18 living with them, 49.02% were married couples living together, 0.00% had a female householder with no husband present, and 50.98% were non-families. 50.98% of all households were made up of individuals, and 50.98% had someone living alone who was 65 years of age or older. The average household size was 4.08 and the average family size was 2.51.

The CDP's age distribution consisted of 35.2% under the age of 18, 7.0% from 18 to 24, 7% from 25 to 44, 18% from 45 to 64, and 32.8% who were 65 years of age or older. The median age was 48.1 years. For every 100 females, there were 141.5 males. For every 100 females age 18 and over, there were 151.5 males.

== Religion ==
- Greenwood Methodist Church
- Minor Church of Christ
- Mulkeytown Christian Church - (Est. 1818)
- Mulkeytown Baptist Church

== Education ==
- Mulkeytown Grade School (closed 1987 and consolidated with Christopher Elementary School) - Now re-purposed as the West Franklin Historical District and Genealogical Society.
- Christopher Unit School District #99
- Rend Lake College
- John A. Logan College
- Southern Illinois University Carbondale

== Notable people ==
- Snyder Solomon Kirkpatrick Attorney, U.S. Representative from Kansas
- James F. Rea - Illinois state legislator
