= Valier, Illinois =

- Village
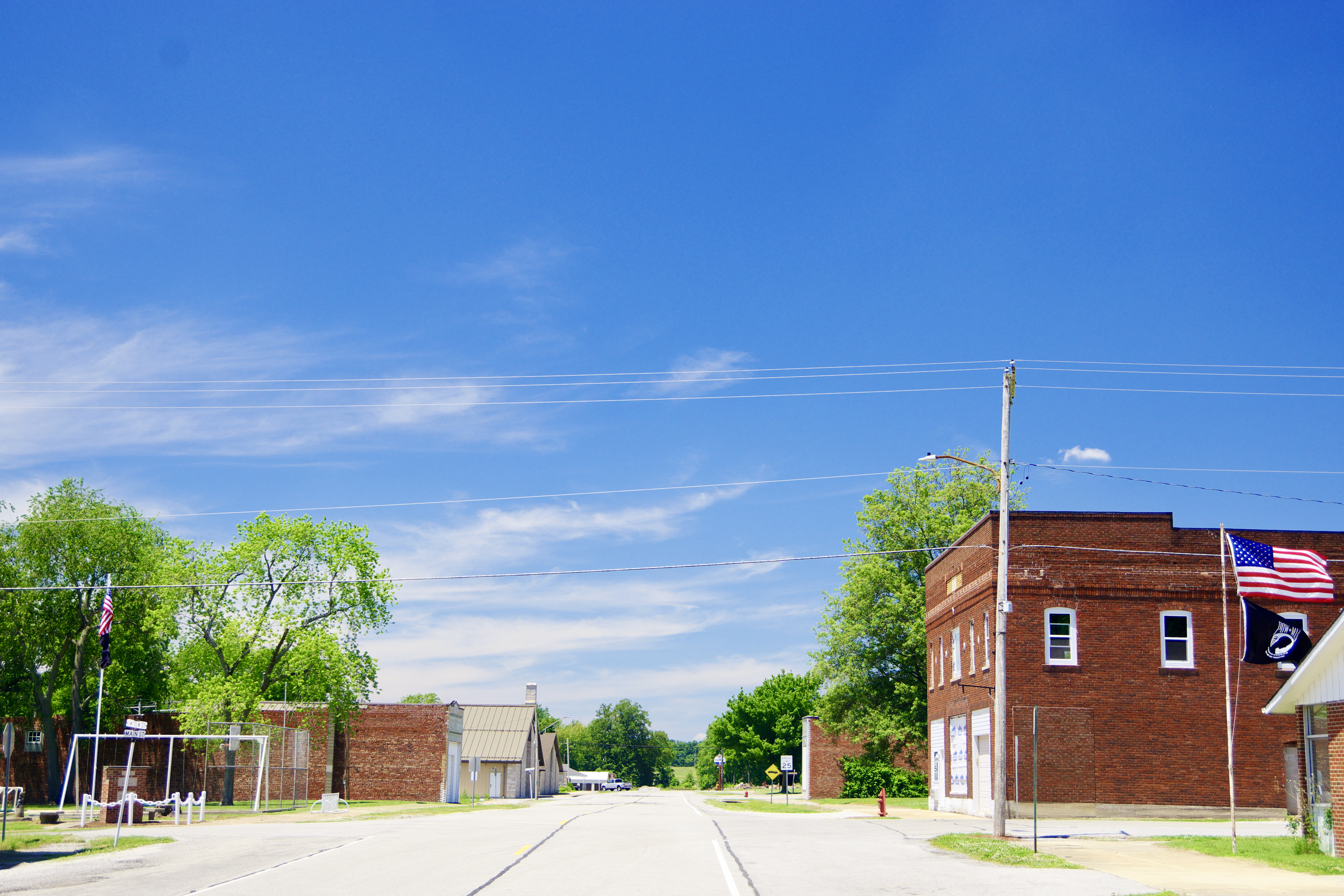
- Main Street

- Location of Valier in Franklin County, Illinois.
- Coordinates: 38°01′03″N 89°02′38″W
- Country: United States
- State: Illinois
- County: Franklin
- Townships: Tyrone, Browning

Area
  - Total: 1.13 sq mi (2.93 km^{2})
  - Land: 1.12 sq mi (2.91 km^{2})
  - Water: 0.0077 sq mi (0.02 km^{2})
- Elevation: 443 ft (135 m)

Population (2020)
  - Total: 554
  - Density: 493.0/sq mi (190.33/km^{2})
- Time zone: UTC-6 (CST)
  - Summer (DST): UTC-5 (CDT)
- ZIP code: 62891
- Area code: 618
- FIPS code: 17-77148
- GNIS feature ID: 2400037
- Website: villageofvalier.org

Valier is a village in Franklin County, Illinois, United States. The population was 554 at the 2020 census.

== History ==
Valier was founded in the early 1900s and named for William Valier, who owned the land upon which the community was established. While a stop along the Chicago, Burlington and Quincy Railroad, the community didn't experience notable expansion until the opening of a coal mine nearby in 1917. The mine operated off and on until closing for good in 1960.

== Geography ==
Valier is located in western Franklin County 9 miles (14 km) west of Benton, the county seat.

According to the 2021 census gazetteer files, Valier has a total area of 1.13 square miles (2.93 km^{2}), of which 1.12 square miles (2.90 km^{2}) (or 99.29%) is land and 0.01 square miles (0.03 km^{2}) (or 0.71%) is water.

== Demographics ==
Historical population
Census	Pop.	Note	%±
1920	876		—
1930	1,176		34.2%
1940	930		−20.9%
1950	808		−13.1%
1960	649		−19.7%
1970	628		−3.2%
1980	729		16.1%
1990	708		−2.9%
2000	662		−6.5%
2010	669		1.1%
2020	554		−17.2%
U.S. Decennial Census

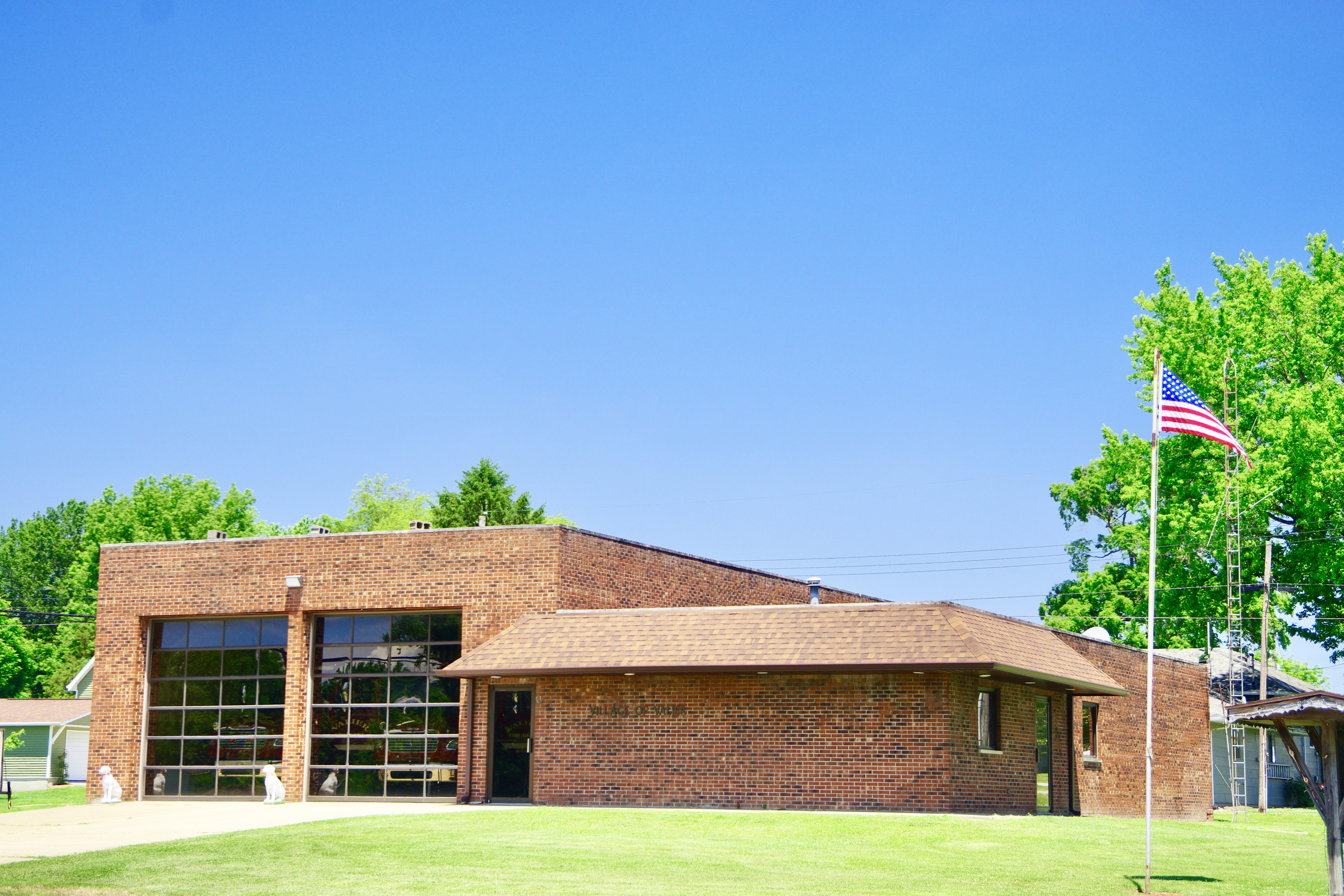
Valier Village Hall

As of the 2020 census there were 554 people, 296 households, and 183 families residing in the village. The population density was 489.40 inhabitants per square mile (188.96/km^{2}). There were 281 housing units at an average density of 248.23 per square mile (95.84/km^{2}). The racial makeup of the village was 95.67% White, 0.00% African American, 0.00% Native American, 0.18% Asian, 0.00% Pacific Islander, 0.54% from other races, and 3.61% from two or more races. Hispanic or Latino of any race were 1.81% of the population.

There were 296 households, out of which 28.7% had children under the age of 18 living with them, 54.73% were married couples living together, 5.74% had a female householder with no husband present, and 38.18% were non-families. 37.16% of all households were made up of individuals, and 25.34% had someone living alone who was 65 years of age or older. The average household size was 3.28 and the average family size was 2.47.

The village's age distribution consisted of 28.2% under the age of 18, 3.4% from 18 to 24, 21.4% from 25 to 44, 22.3% from 45 to 64, and 24.8% who were 65 years of age or older. The median age was 41.9 years. For every 100 females, there were 83.2 males. For every 100 females age 18 and over, there were 88.2 males.

The median income for a household in the village was $36,500, and the median income for a family was $57,212. Males had a median income of $44,875 versus $24,327 for females. The per capita income for the village was $19,703. About 9.8% of families and 13.5% of the population were below the poverty line, including 17.3% of those under age 18 and 6.1% of those age 65 or over.
