= Franklin County, Illinois =

County in Illinois, United States

- County
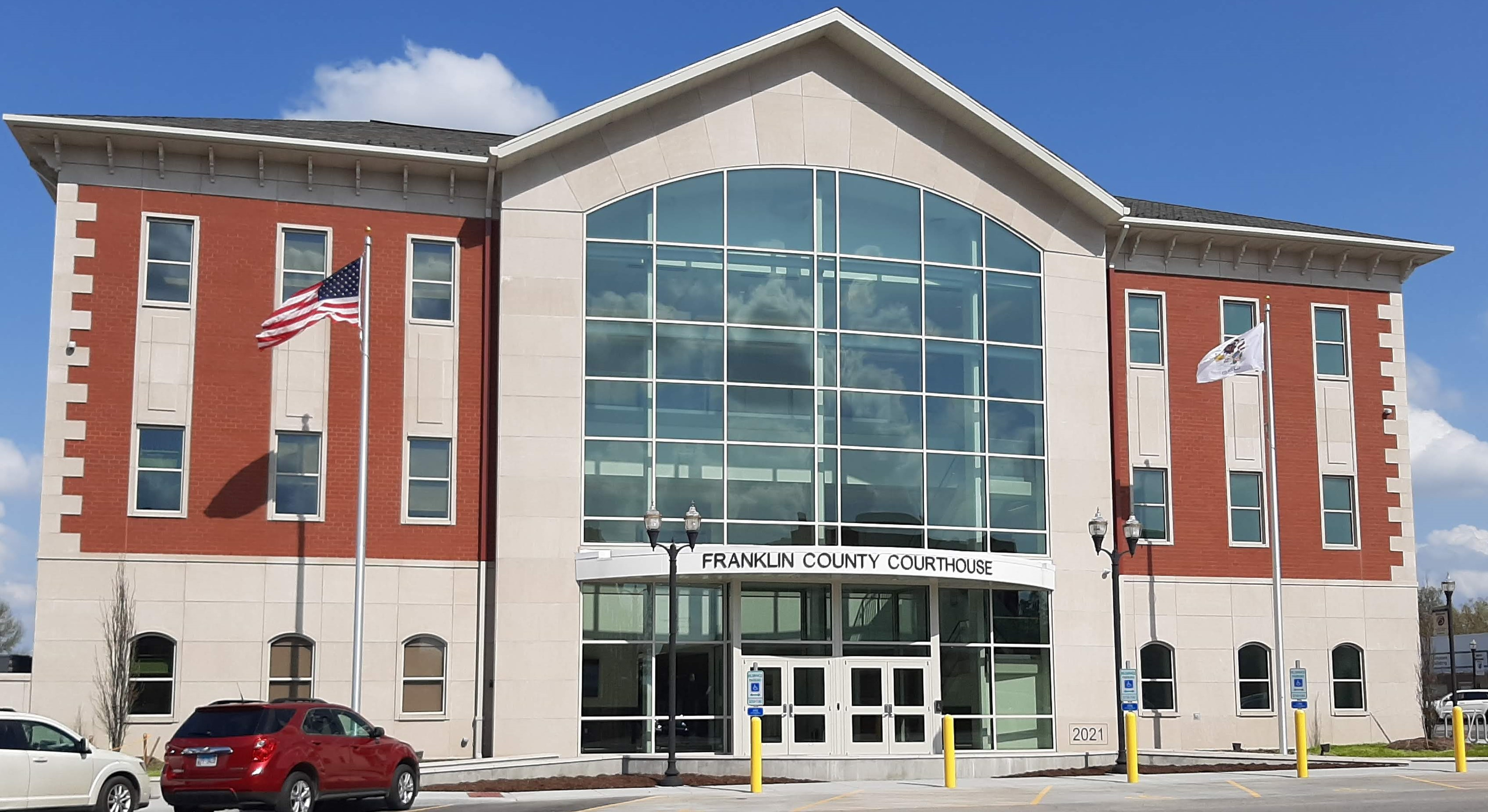
- Franklin County Courthouse in Benton

- Flag

- Location within the U.S. state of Illinois
- Coordinates: 37°59′N 88°55′W
- Country: United States
- State: Illinois
- Founded: January 2, 1818
- Named for: Benjamin Franklin
- Seat: Benton
- Largest city: West Frankfort

Area
  - Total: 432 sq mi (1,120 km^{2})
  - Land: 409 sq mi (1,060 km^{2})
  - Water: 23 sq mi (60 km^{2}) 5.2%

Population (2020)
  - Total: 37,804
  - Estimate (2025): 36,916 ▼
  - Density: 92.4/sq mi (35.7/km^{2})
- Time zone: UTC−6 (Central)
  - Summer (DST): UTC−5 (CDT)
- Congressional district: 12th
- Website: www.franklincountyil.gov

Franklin County is a county in Southern Illinois. At the 2020 census, it had a population of 37,804. The largest city is West Frankfort and the county seat is Benton. Franklin County is located in the Metro Lakeland area of Southern Illinois, deep within "Little Egypt".

== History ==
Franklin County was established on January 2, 1818, and formed from parts of Gallatin and White counties. It was named for Benjamin Franklin.

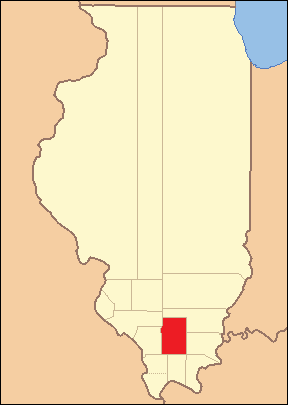
Franklin County at the time of its formation in 1818

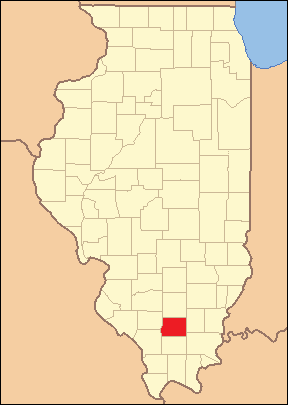
The creation of Williamson County in 1839 reduced Franklin to its current borders.

=== Coal mining ===
Coal was mined in Franklin County as early as 1889, at the King Coal Mine, located at Township 5 South, Range 3 East.

The high levels of gas found in Franklin County's coal deposits have resulted in mining disasters and explosions over the years. Between 1905 and 1968, there were eleven mine disasters. In 1905, the Zeigler No. 1 mine, located in Zeigler, had an explosion that killed about fifty people. In 1917, an explosion in Old Ben Mine No. 11, located in Christopher, killed 17. The worst explosion occurred in 1951, in the Orient No. 2 Mine in West Frankfort, in which 119 people died.

The West Frankfort quadrangle of Franklin County is home to 17 coal mines, according to a 2004 report.

== Geography ==
According to the U.S. Census Bureau, the county has a total area of 431 square miles (1,120 km^{2}), of which 409 square miles (1,060 km^{2}) is land and 23 square miles (60 km^{2}) (5.2%) is water. Wayne Fitzgerrell State Recreation Area is located in this county.

=== Climate and weather ===
Benton, Illinois

Climate chart (precipitation, max. and min. temperature)
J	F	M	A	M	J	J	A	S	O	N	D
2.9 39 21	2.9 45 26	4.2 56 36	4.5 67 45	4.6 76 54	4.1 85 63	3.2 90 68	3 88 65	2.9 81 58	2.9 69 45	4.5 56 37	3.6 43 26
- █ Average max. and min. temperatures in °F
- █ Precipitation totals in inches
- Source: The Weather Channel
Metric conversion
J	F	M	A	M	J	J	A	S	O	N	D
74 4 −6	73 7 −3	106 13 2	114 19 7	117 24 12	103 29 17	81 32 20	77 31 18	73 27 14	75 21 7	114 13 3	90 6 −3
- █ Average max. and min. temperatures in °C
- █ Precipitation totals in mm

In recent years, average temperatures in the county seat of Benton have ranged from a low of 21 °F (−6 °C) in January to a high of 90 °F (32 °C) in July, although a record low of −22 °F (−30 °C) was recorded in January 1977 and a record high of 104 °F (40 °C) was recorded in August 2007. Average monthly precipitation ranged from 2.87 inches (73 mm) in February to 4.59 inches (117 mm) in May.

On April 21, 1912, a tornado destroyed facilities at the Possum Ridge Mine.

On March 18, 1925, Franklin County was among five southern Illinois counties affected by the infamous Tri-State Tornado. The storm cut across the southern edge of the county, hitting West Frankfort and destroying most of the northern side of town, causing significant damage to the town's mining facilities. Farther to the east, the village of Parrish was also struck, and was never rebuilt. The storm killed 192 people in Franklin County, injuring hundreds more and leaving scores of people homeless.

=== Adjacent counties ===
- Jefferson County (north)
- Hamilton County (east)
- Saline County (southeast)
- Williamson County (south)
- Jackson County (southwest)
- Perry County (west)

=== Transit ===
- South Central Transit

=== Major highways ===
- Interstate 57
- Illinois Route 14
- Illinois Route 34
- Illinois Route 37
- Illinois Route 148
- Illinois Route 149
- Illinois Route 154
- Illinois Route 184

== Demographics ==
Historical population
Census	Pop.	Note	%±
1820	1,763		—
1830	4,083		131.6%
1840	3,682		−9.8%
1850	5,681		54.3%
1860	9,393		65.3%
1870	12,652		34.7%
1880	16,129		27.5%
1890	17,138		6.3%
1900	19,675		14.8%
1910	25,943		31.9%
1920	57,293		120.8%
1930	59,442		3.8%
1940	53,137		−10.6%
1950	48,685		−8.4%
1960	39,281		−19.3%
1970	38,329		−2.4%
1980	43,201		12.7%
1990	40,319		−6.7%
2000	39,018		−3.2%
2010	39,561		1.4%
2020	37,804		−4.4%
2025 (est.)	36,916	▼	−2.3%
U.S. Decennial Census; 1790-1960 1900-1990; 1990-2000 2010-2013

2000 census age pyramid for Franklin County

=== 2020 census ===
As of the 2020 census, the county had a population of 37,804. The median age was 44.1 years. 21.5% of residents were under the age of 18 and 21.9% of residents were 65 years of age or older. For every 100 females there were 98.1 males, and for every 100 females age 18 and over there were 95.2 males age 18 and over.

The racial makeup of the county was 93.8% White, 0.5% Black or African American, 0.3% American Indian and Alaska Native, 0.3% Asian, <0.1% Native Hawaiian and Pacific Islander, 0.5% from some other race, and 4.6% from two or more races. Hispanic or Latino residents of any race comprised 1.7% of the population.

40.8% of residents lived in urban areas, while 59.2% lived in rural areas.

There were 16,251 households in the county, of which 27.2% had children under the age of 18 living in them. Of all households, 45.3% were married-couple households, 20.3% were households with a male householder and no spouse or partner present, and 27.1% were households with a female householder and no spouse or partner present. About 32.0% of all households were made up of individuals and 15.9% had someone living alone who was 65 years of age or older.

There were 18,480 housing units, of which 12.1% were vacant. Among occupied housing units, 73.2% were owner-occupied and 26.8% were renter-occupied. The homeowner vacancy rate was 3.2% and the rental vacancy rate was 11.0%.

=== Racial and ethnic composition ===
Franklin County, Illinois – Racial and ethnic composition Note: the US Census treats Hispanic/Latino as an ethnic category. This table excludes Latinos from the racial categories and assigns them to a separate category. Hispanics/Latinos may be of any race.
Race / Ethnicity (NH = Non-Hispanic)	Pop 1980	Pop 1990	Pop 2000	Pop 2010	Pop 2020	% 1980	% 1990	% 2000	% 2010	% 2020
White alone (NH)	42,879	39,979	38,323	38,353	35,210	99.25%	99.16%	98.22%	96.95%	93.14%
Black or African American alone (NH)	33	36	57	118	162	0.08%	0.09%	0.15%	0.30%	0.43%
Native American or Alaska Native alone (NH)	50	106	76	92	92	0.12%	0.26%	0.19%	0.23%	0.24%
Asian alone (NH)	41	81	68	122	119	0.09%	0.20%	0.17%	0.31%	0.31%
Native Hawaiian or Pacific Islander alone (NH)	x	x	3	3	4	x	x	0.01%	0.01%	0.01%
Other race alone (NH)	30	7	3	13	63	0.07%	0.02%	0.01%	0.03%	0.17%
Mixed race or Multiracial (NH)	x	x	239	385	1,512	x	x	0.61%	0.97%	4.00%
Hispanic or Latino (any race)	168	110	249	475	642	0.39%	0.27%	0.64%	1.20%	1.70%
Total	43,201	40,319	39,018	39,561	37,804	100.00%	100.00%	100.00%	100.00%	100.00%

=== 2010 census ===
As of the 2010 United States census, there were 39,561 people, 16,617 households, and 10,912 families residing in the county. The population density was 96.8 inhabitants per square mile (37.4/km^{2}). There were 18,525 housing units at an average density of 45.3 per square mile (17.5/km^{2}). The racial makeup of the county was 97.7% white, 0.3% Asian, 0.3% American Indian, 0.3% black or African American, 0.3% from other races, and 1.1% from two or more races. Those of Hispanic or Latino origin made up 1.2% of the population. In terms of ancestry, 21.8% were German, 18.7% were Irish, 15.9% were English, 9.4% were American, and 5.7% were Italian.

Of the 16,617 households, 30.0% had children under the age of 18 living with them, 48.8% were married couples living together, 11.6% had a female householder with no husband present, 34.3% were non-families, and 30.0% of all households were made up of individuals. The average household size was 2.35 and the average family size was 2.88. The median age was 41.8 years.

The median income for a household in the county was $34,381 and the median income for a family was $43,170. Males had a median income of $39,122 versus $28,950 for females. The per capita income for the county was $18,504. About 14.5% of families and 19.8% of the population were below the poverty line, including 30.5% of those under age 18 and 9.9% of those age 65 or over.

== Communities ==
=== Cities ===
- Benton (seat)
- Christopher
- Orient
- Sesser
- West Frankfort
- Zeigler

=== Villages ===
- Buckner
- Ewing
- Freeman Spur (mostly in Williamson County)
- Hanaford
- Macedonia (partly in Hamilton County)
- North City
- Royalton
- Thompsonville
- Valier
- West City

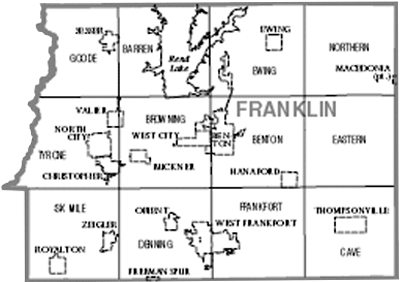
Map of Franklin County, Illinois

=== Census-designated place ===
- Mulkeytown

=== Townships ===
Franklin County is divided into twelve townships:

- Barren
- Benton
- Browning
- Cave
- Denning
- Eastern
- Ewing
- Frankfort
- Goode
- Northern
- Six Mile
- Tyrone

=== Unincorporated communities ===
- Akin
- Akin Junction
- Cleburne
- Deering City
- Frisco
- Kegley
- Meyer
- Parrish
- Pershing
- Plumfield
- Rend City
- Steel City
- Valier Patch
- West End
- Whittington

== Education ==
=== Regional ===
- Franklin, Johnson, Massac, and Williamson County Regional Office of Education #21

=== Primary and secondary ===
- Christopher Unit School District 99
- Sesser-Valier Community Unit School District 196
- Benton Community Consolidated School District 47
- Frankfort Community Unit School District 168
- Zeigler-Royalton Community Unit School District 188
- Thompsonville Community Unit School District 174
- Ewing-Northern Community Consolidated School District 115

=== Higher education ===
- John A. Logan College Extension Center - West Frankfort

=== Specialized ===
- Franklin & Jefferson County Special Education Cooperative

== Politics ==
Franklin County voted mostly for Democratic US presidential candidates until 2000. Since then it has voted for Republican presidential nominees.

United States presidential election results for Franklin County, Illinois
Year	Republican		Democratic		Third party(ies)	
Year	No.	%	No.	%	No.	%
1892	1,631	44.25%	1,782	48.35%	273	7.41%
1896	2,038	47.43%	2,233	51.97%	26	0.61%
1900	2,117	47.99%	2,226	50.46%	68	1.54%
1904	2,077	50.04%	1,801	43.39%	273	6.58%
1908	2,539	48.52%	2,401	45.88%	293	5.60%
1912	2,098	36.12%	2,435	41.92%	1,276	21.97%
1916	6,371	46.42%	6,419	46.77%	934	6.81%
1920	7,608	51.11%	4,894	32.88%	2,384	16.02%
1924	6,779	39.59%	5,791	33.82%	4,551	26.58%
1928	9,900	45.79%	11,369	52.58%	353	1.63%
1932	7,560	32.46%	14,754	63.35%	976	4.19%
1936	10,708	40.22%	15,254	57.29%	663	2.49%
1940	12,936	45.14%	15,523	54.16%	201	0.70%
1944	11,377	49.01%	11,663	50.24%	173	0.75%
1948	9,407	43.87%	11,750	54.79%	287	1.34%
1952	11,723	49.33%	11,981	50.41%	62	0.26%
1956	11,761	50.98%	11,308	49.02%	0	0.00%
1960	11,861	50.98%	11,368	48.86%	37	0.16%
1964	7,620	35.94%	13,581	64.06%	0	0.00%
1968	9,036	42.88%	10,095	47.90%	1,943	9.22%
1972	10,121	54.04%	8,545	45.62%	63	0.34%
1976	7,420	36.51%	12,818	63.07%	86	0.42%
1980	9,731	49.01%	9,425	47.47%	700	3.53%
1984	9,656	47.39%	10,667	52.35%	54	0.27%
1988	7,677	40.87%	11,023	58.69%	83	0.44%
1992	5,504	25.62%	12,744	59.33%	3,233	15.05%
1996	5,354	30.84%	9,814	56.54%	2,190	12.62%
2000	8,490	44.19%	10,201	53.10%	521	2.71%
2004	10,388	53.68%	8,816	45.56%	148	0.76%
2008	9,404	50.25%	8,880	47.45%	430	2.30%
2012	10,267	57.31%	7,254	40.49%	393	2.19%
2016	13,116	70.10%	4,727	25.26%	868	4.64%
2020	13,622	72.97%	4,760	25.50%	287	1.54%
2024	13,200	74.41%	4,257	24.00%	282	1.59%

== See also ==
- National Register of Historic Places listings in Franklin County, Illinois
- Ku Klux Klan in Southern Illinois
- Fourth Franklin County Courthouse
