= Thompsonville, Illinois =

- Village
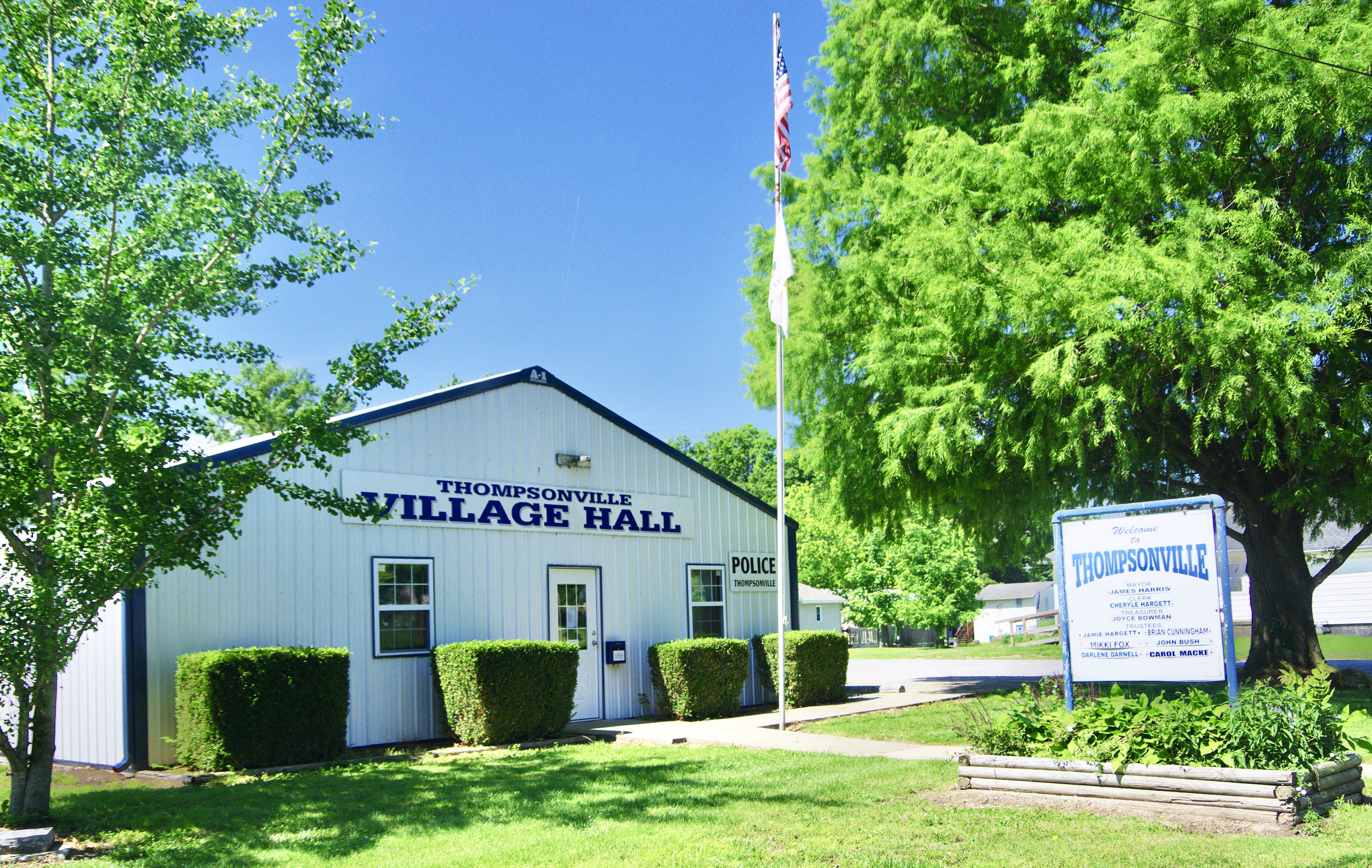
- Village Hall

- Location of Thompsonville in Franklin County, Illinois.
- Coordinates: 37°54′52″N 88°45′14″W
- Country: United States
- State: Illinois
- County: Franklin
- Township: Cave

Area
  - Total: 2.05 sq mi (5.30 km^{2})
  - Land: 2.03 sq mi (5.26 km^{2})
  - Water: 0.015 sq mi (0.04 km^{2})
- Elevation: 492 ft (150 m)

Population (2020)
  - Total: 486
  - Density: 239/sq mi (92.4/km^{2})
- Time zone: UTC-6 (CST)
  - Summer (DST): UTC-5 (CDT)
- ZIP code: 62890
- Area code: 618
- FIPS code: 17-75159
- GNIS feature ID: 2399972

Thompsonville is a village in Cave Township, Franklin County, Illinois, United States. The population was 486 at the 2020 census.

== History ==
There was an early settlement started in the general vicinity called "Jordan's Settlement". It was founded in 1811.

== Geography ==
Thompsonville is located in southeastern Franklin County. Illinois Route 34 passes through the village, leading northwest 10 miles (16 km) to Benton, the county seat, and southeast 21 miles (34 km) to Harrisburg. Illinois Route 149 leads west from Thompsonville 9 miles (14 km) to West Frankfort.

According to the 2021 census gazetteer files, Thompsonville has a total area of 2.05 square miles (5.31 km^{2}), of which 2.03 square miles (5.26 km^{2}) (or 99.22%) is land and 0.02 square miles (0.05 km^{2}) (or 0.78%) is water.

== Demographics ==
Historical population
Census	Pop.	Note	%±
1880	172		—
1890	309		79.7%
1900	398		28.8%
1910	573		44.0%
1920	577		0.7%
1930	569		−1.4%
1940	568		−0.2%
1950	530		−6.7%
1960	428		−19.2%
1970	449		4.9%
1980	610		35.9%
1990	602		−1.3%
2000	571		−5.1%
2010	543		−4.9%
2020	486		−10.5%
U.S. Decennial Census

As of the 2020 census there were 486 people, 220 households, and 112 families residing in the village. The population density was 237.42 inhabitants per square mile (91.67/km^{2}). There were 261 housing units at an average density of 127.50 per square mile (49.23/km^{2}). The racial makeup of the village was 94.44% White, 0.21% African American, 0.41% Native American, 0.21% Asian, 0.00% Pacific Islander, 0.21% from other races, and 4.53% from two or more races. Hispanic or Latino of any race were 1.03% of the population.

There were 220 households, out of which 30.0% had children under the age of 18 living with them, 34.09% were married couples living together, 10.00% had a female householder with no husband present, and 49.09% were non-families. 45.91% of all households were made up of individuals, and 31.82% had someone living alone who was 65 years of age or older. The average household size was 3.45 and the average family size was 2.40.

The village's age distribution consisted of 29.6% under the age of 18, 11.6% from 18 to 24, 17.4% from 25 to 44, 18.4% from 45 to 64, and 23.0% who were 65 years of age or older. The median age was 36.5 years. For every 100 females, there were 59.2 males. For every 100 females age 18 and over, there were 66.4 males.

The median income for a household in the village was $35,833, and the median income for a family was $63,611. Males had a median income of $43,417 versus $14,286 for females. The per capita income for the village was $19,557. About 17.9% of families and 24.3% of the population were below the poverty line, including 23.7% of those under age 18 and 24.8% of those age 65 or over.
