= Illinois Route 14 =

State highway in southern Illinois, US

Illinois Route 14
- IL 14 highlighted in red

Route information
- Maintained by IDOT
- Length: 76.24 mi (122.70 km)
- Existed: November 5, 1918–present

Major junctions
- West end: US 51 in Du Quoin
- I-57 in Benton; US 45 in Enfield; IL 1 from Carmi to Crossville
- East end: SR 66 in Phillipstown New Harmony bridge was closed on May 29, 2012

Location
- Country: United States
- State: Illinois
- Counties: Perry, Franklin, Hamilton, White

Highway system
- Illinois State Highway System; Interstate; US; State; Tollways; Scenic
← US 14	→ IL 15
← IL 138	→ IL 140

Illinois Route 14 (IL 14) is a major east–west highway in southern Illinois. It runs from U.S. Route 51 south of Du Quoin to the New Harmony Toll Bridge over the Wabash River to State Road 66 at the Indiana state line. This is a distance of 76.24 miles (122.70 km).

== Route description ==
Illinois 14 runs mostly east–west from Du Quoin to New Harmony, Indiana.

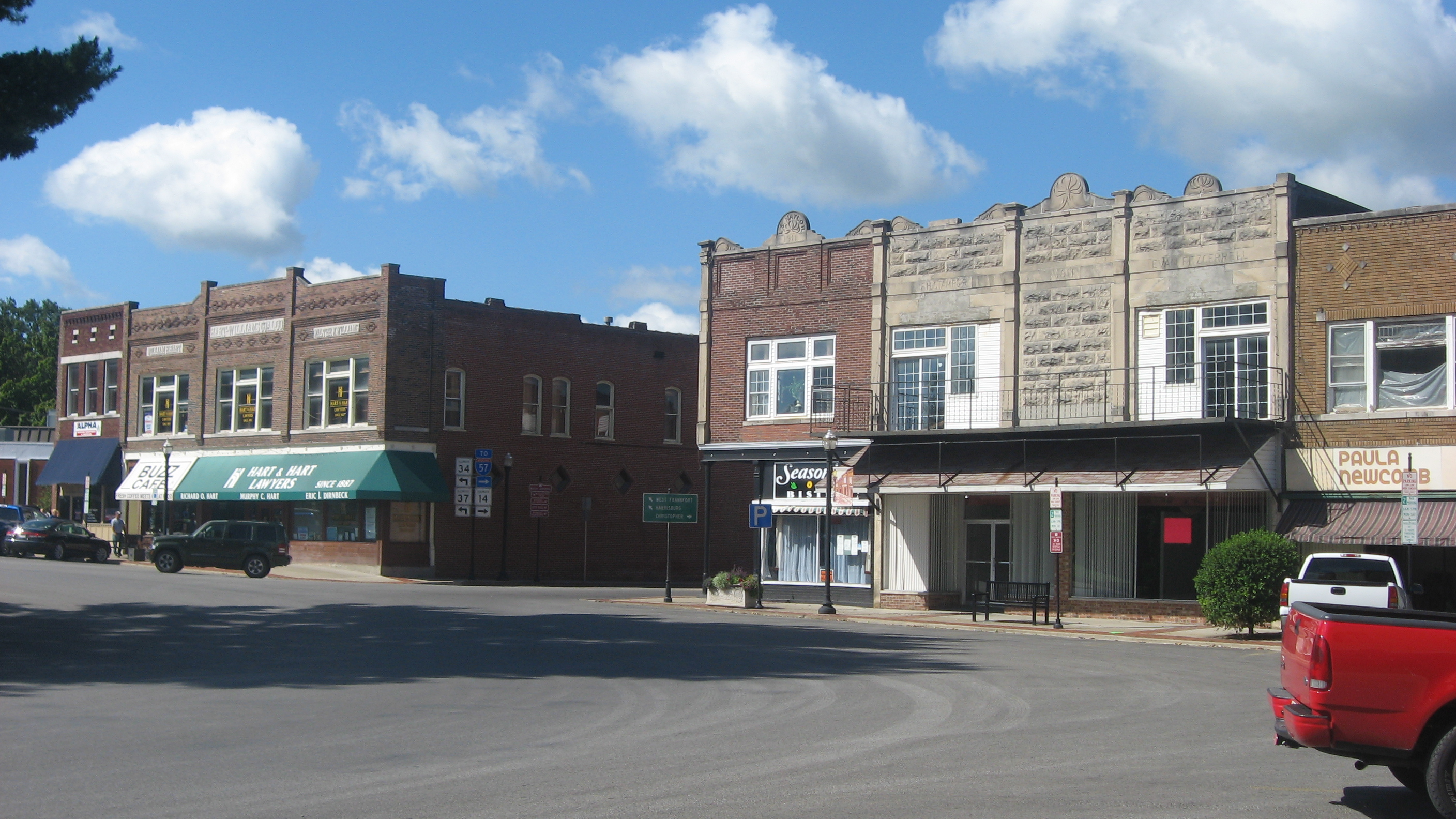
Courthouse Square in Benton, Illinois (Illinois Routes 14/37)

IL 14 begins to travel eastward at US 51 in Du Quoin. The route then proceeds to intersect IL 184 in Mulkeytown, IL 148 in Christopher. It then traverses through Bruckner and West City. In West City, it then meets I-57 at a diamond interchange. After crossing over I-57, it then encounters IL 34 and IL 37 in Benton's public square around the Franklin County Courthouse. It then travels northward via IL 37 and soon branches off eastward. Continuing on, it then intersects IL 142 in McLeansboro. Also, it briefly runs concurrently with southbound IL 142.

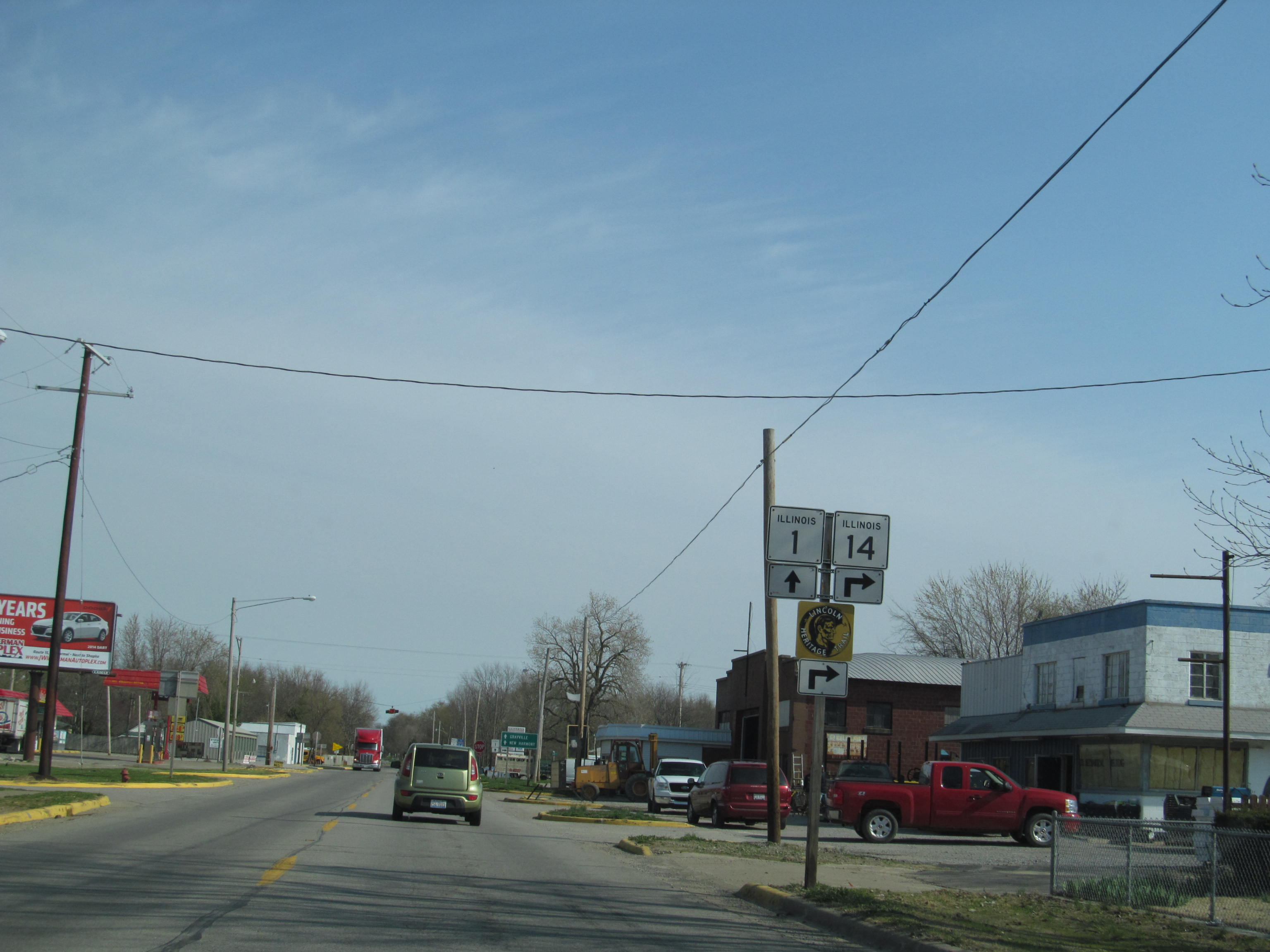
IL 14 and IL 1 in Crossville

Continuing eastward from McLeansboro, IL 14 then serves the Hamilton County State Fish and Wildlife Area. It then intersects US 45 south of Enfield. After that, it then reaches Carmi where it travels northeastward via IL 1. The concurrency continues like that until it reaches Crossville. At this point, IL 14 travels eastward towards the Wabash River. Just west of New Harmony, Indiana, the route ends at the former New Harmony Toll Bridge approach.

The eastern terminus of Illinois 14 is the New Harmony Toll Bridge, which used to bridge the states of Illinois and Indiana. The now-abandoned toll bridge is a four-span truss bridge that was built in 1931. It was built as a toll bridge, but has since been closed to automobile traffic since May 21, 2012.

== History ==
Illinois Route 14 followed the present-day routing of Illinois 14, from Du Quoin to Carmi. In 1937 it was extended east to its current terminus across from New Harmony, Indiana, replacing Illinois Route 139 in the process.

From 1947 to 1974, U.S. Route 460 replaced Illinois 14 between McLeansboro and the Indiana state line; after 1974, the extended routing of 1937 was restored.

== Major intersections ==
County	Location	mi	km	Destinations	Notes
Perry		0.0	0.0	US 51 – Carbondale, Du Quoin	Western terminus
Franklin	Mulkeytown	6.7	10.8	IL 184 south – Mulkeytown	
Franklin	Christopher	10.0	16.1	IL 148 (Victor Street) – Herrin, Mt. Vernon	
Franklin	West City	16.6	26.7	I-57 – Mt. Vernon, Cairo	I-57 exit 71
Franklin	Benton	17.4	28.0	IL 37 south / IL 34 east / Lincoln Heritage Trail (Southern Branch) – West Frankfort, Harrisburg	West end of IL 37 overlap
Franklin	Benton	18.3	29.5	IL 37 north – Mt. Vernon	East end of IL 37 overlap
Hamilton	McLeansboro	41.0	66.0	IL 142 (Jackson Street) / Lincoln Heritage Trail (Eastern Branch) – Eldorado, Mt. Vernon	
White	Enfield	52.0	83.7	US 45 – Norris City, Enfield	
White	Carmi	61.4	98.8	IL 1 south – Eldorado	West end of IL 1 overlap
White	Crossville	69.0	111.0	IL 1 north – Grayville	East end of IL 1 overlap
Wabash River		76.24	122.70	New Harmony Toll Bridge	
Wabash River		76.24	122.70	SR 66 east – Evansville	Continuation into Indiana is closed due to bridge closure
1.000 mi = 1.609 km; 1.000 km = 0.621 mi: Closed/former; Concurrency terminus
