= Elk Prairie Township, Jefferson County, Illinois =

Elk Prairie Township
- Township
- Location in Jefferson County

- Jefferson County's location in Illinois
- Coordinates: 38°10′N 88°59′W
- Country: United States
- State: Illinois
- County: Jefferson

Area
  - Total: 36.60 sq mi (94.8 km^{2})
  - Land: 27.46 sq mi (71.1 km^{2})
  - Water: 9.14 sq mi (23.7 km^{2}) 24.98%
- Elevation: 413 ft (126 m)

Population (2020)
  - Total: 701
  - Density: 25.5/sq mi (9.86/km^{2})
- Time zone: UTC-6 (CST)
  - Summer (DST): UTC-5 (CDT)
- ZIP codes: 62816, 62846, 62883, 62894
- FIPS code: 17-081-23334

Elk Prairie Township is one of sixteen townships in Jefferson County, Illinois, USA. As of the 2020 census, its population was 701 and it contained 326 housing units.

== Geography ==
According to the 2021 census gazetteer files, Elk Prairie Township has a total area of 36.60 square miles (94.79 km^{2}), of which 27.46 square miles (71.12 km^{2}) (or 75.02%) is land and 9.14 square miles (23.67 km^{2}) (or 24.98%) is water. The township is centered at 38°10'N 88°59'W (38.170,-88.987).

=== Cities, towns, villages ===
- Nason
- Waltonville (southeast quarter)

=== Unincorporated towns ===
- Dareville at 38.198°N 88.976°W

(This list is based on USGS data and may include former settlements.)

=== Extinct towns ===
- Fitzgerrell at 38.138°N 89.014°W

(These towns are listed as "historical" by the USGS.)

=== Adjacent townships ===
- McClellan Township (north)
- Dodds Township (northeast)
- Spring Garden Township (east)
- Ewing Township, Franklin County (southeast)
- Barren Township, Franklin County (south)
- Goode Township, Franklin County (southwest)
- Bald Hill Township (west)
- Blissville Township (northwest)

=== Cemeteries ===
The township contains these four cemeteries: Abner, Clampet, Mason and Old Baptist.

=== Major highways ===
- Illinois Route 148

== Demographics ==
As of the 2020 census there were 701 people, 299 households, and 193 families residing in the township. The population density was 19.15 inhabitants per square mile (7.39/km^{2}). There were 326 housing units at an average density of 8.91 per square mile (3.44/km^{2}). The racial makeup of the township was 94.86% White, 0.71% African American, 0.29% Native American, 0.00% Asian, 0.00% Pacific Islander, 0.29% from other races, and 3.85% from two or more races. Hispanic or Latino of any race were 1.00% of the population.

There were 299 households, out of which 24.10% had children under the age of 18 living with them, 52.84% were married couples living together, 4.35% had a female householder with no spouse present, and 35.45% were non-families. 30.10% of all households were made up of individuals, and 14.40% had someone living alone who was 65 years of age or older. The average household size was 2.19 and the average family size was 2.72.

The township's age distribution consisted of 19.2% under the age of 18, 6.7% from 18 to 24, 20.3% from 25 to 44, 30.2% from 45 to 64, and 23.6% who were 65 years of age or older. The median age was 48.1 years. For every 100 females, there were 115.1 males. For every 100 females age 18 and over, there were 107.8 males.

The median income for a household in the township was $48,750, and the median income for a family was $66,250. Males had a median income of $37,404 versus $16,736 for females. The per capita income for the township was $26,443. About 4.7% of families and 12.5% of the population were below the poverty line, including 7.9% of those under age 18 and 17.4% of those age 65 or over.

Historical population
Census	Pop.	Note	%±
2000	667		—
2010	725		8.7%
2020	701		−3.3%
U.S. Decennial Census

== School districts ==
- Waltonville Community Unit School District 1

== Political districts ==
- Illinois' 19th congressional district
- State House District 107
- State Senate District 54
