= Bald Hill Township, Jefferson County, Illinois =

Bald Hill Township
- Township
- Location in Jefferson County

- Jefferson County's location in Illinois
- Coordinates: 38°10′N 89°6′W
- Country: United States
- State: Illinois
- County: Jefferson
- Established: November 2, 1869

Area
  - Total: 36.13 sq mi (93.6 km^{2})
  - Land: 35.83 sq mi (92.8 km^{2})
  - Water: 0.30 sq mi (0.78 km^{2}) 0.82%
- Elevation: 486 ft (148 m)

Population (2020)
  - Total: 800
  - Density: 22/sq mi (8.6/km^{2})
- Time zone: UTC-6 (CST)
  - Summer (DST): UTC-5 (CDT)
- ZIP codes: 62883, 62894
- FIPS code: 17-081-03428

Bald Hill Township is one of sixteen townships in Jefferson County, Illinois, USA. As of the 2020 census, its population was 800 and it contained 363 housing units.

== Geography ==
According to the 2021 census gazetteer files, Bald Hill Township (T4S R1E) has a total area of 36.13 square miles (93.58 km^{2}), of which 35.83 square miles (92.80 km^{2}) (or 99.18%) is land and 0.30 square miles (0.78 km^{2}) (or 0.82%) is water.

=== Cities, towns, villages ===
- Waltonville (northeast quarter)

=== Unincorporated towns ===
- Emerson City at 38.140°N 89.045°W
- Scheller at 38.186°N 89.095°W

(This list is based on USGS data and may include former settlements.)

=== Adjacent townships ===
- Blissville Township (north)
- McClellan Township (northeast)
- Elk Prairie Township (east)
- Barren Township, Franklin County (southeast)
- Goode Township, Franklin County (south)
- DuBois Township, Washington County (northwest)

=== Cemeteries ===
The township contains these five cemeteries: Bald Hill, Dryden, Saint Barbara, Stephens and Ward.

=== Major highways ===
- Illinois Route 148

== Demographics ==
As of the 2020 census there were 800 people, 318 households, and 242 families residing in the township. The population density was 22.14 inhabitants per square mile (8.55/km^{2}). There were 363 housing units at an average density of 10.05 per square mile (3.88/km^{2}). The racial makeup of the township was 95.25% White, 1.00% African American, 0.00% Native American, 0.00% Asian, 0.00% Pacific Islander, 0.38% from other races, and 3.38% from two or more races. Hispanic or Latino of any race were 0.50% of the population.

There were 318 households, out of which 38.40% had children under the age of 18 living with them, 60.06% were married couples living together, 13.84% had a female householder with no spouse present, and 23.90% were non-families. 22.60% of all households were made up of individuals, and 10.70% had someone living alone who was 65 years of age or older. The average household size was 2.58 and the average family size was 3.03.

The township's age distribution consisted of 28.8% under the age of 18, 4.8% from 18 to 24, 28.6% from 25 to 44, 22.1% from 45 to 64, and 15.7% who were 65 years of age or older. The median age was 41.2 years. For every 100 females, there were 116.9 males. For every 100 females age 18 and over, there were 95.3 males.

The median income for a household in the township was $61,613, and the median income for a family was $71,528. Males had a median income of $49,063 versus $15,446 for females. The per capita income for the township was $25,222. About 12.8% of families and 12.7% of the population were below the poverty line, including 17.8% of those under age 18 and 8.5% of those age 65 or over.

Historical population
Census	Pop.	Note	%±
2000	733		—
2010	767		4.6%
2020	800		4.3%
U.S. Decennial Census

== School districts ==
- Sesser-Valier Community Unit School District 196
- Waltonville Community Unit School District 1

== Political districts ==
- Illinois' 19th congressional district
- State House District 107
- State Senate District 54
