= Barren Township, Franklin County, Illinois =

Barren Township
- Township
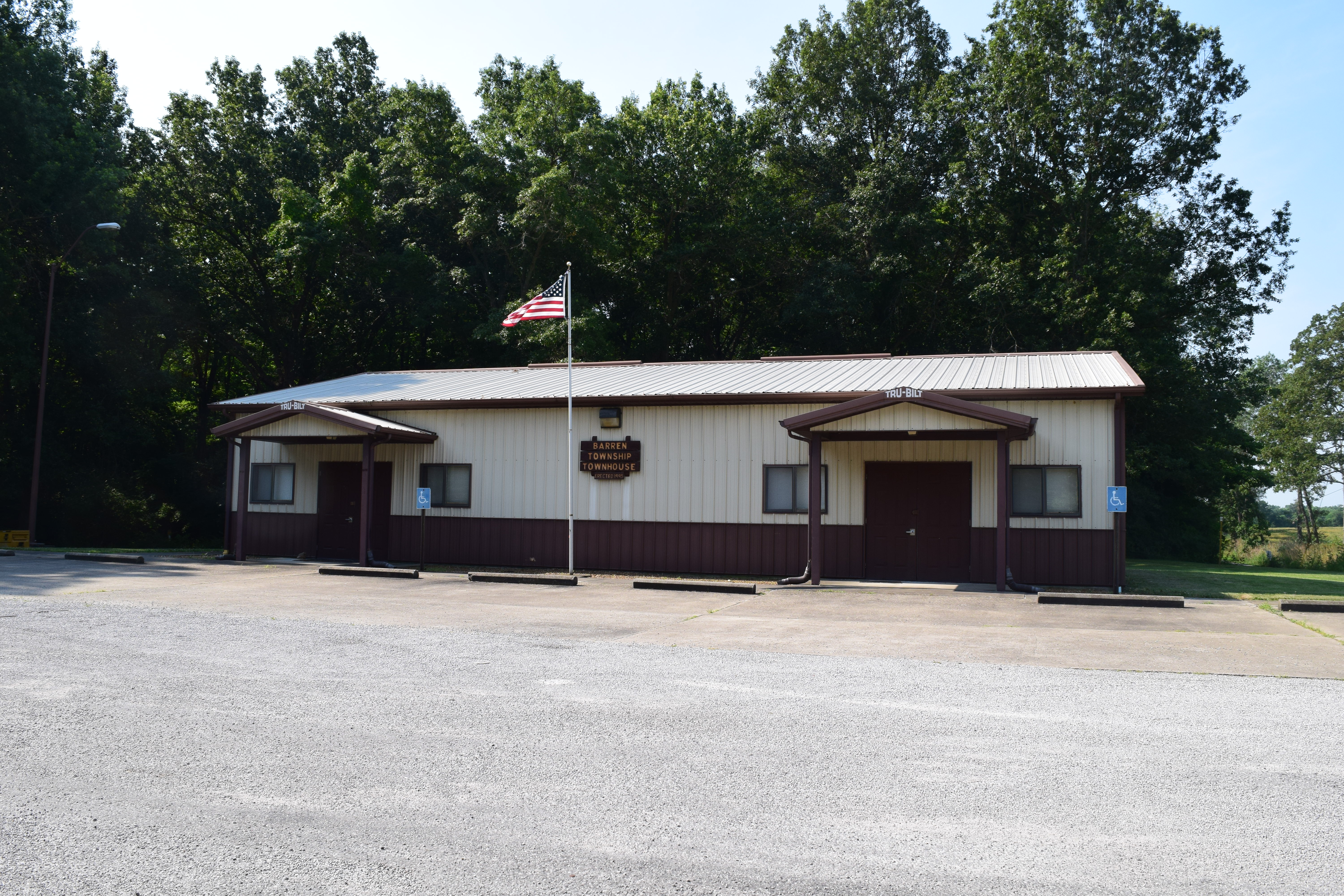
- Barren Township Townhouse

- Location in Franklin County

- Franklin County's location in Illinois
- Coordinates: 38°05′13″N 88°59′34″W
- Country: United States
- State: Illinois
- County: Franklin
- Established: November 4, 1884

Area
  - Total: 36.17 sq mi (93.7 km^{2})
  - Land: 20.96 sq mi (54.3 km^{2})
  - Water: 15.21 sq mi (39.4 km^{2}) 42.06%
- Elevation: 430 ft (130 m)

Population (2020)
  - Total: 551
  - Density: 26.3/sq mi (10.1/km^{2})
- Time zone: UTC-6 (CST)
  - Summer (DST): UTC-5 (CDT)
- ZIP codes: 62812, 62884, 62897
- FIPS code: 17-055-03818

Barren Township is one of twelve townships in Franklin County, Illinois, USA. As of the 2020 census, its population was 551 and it contained 248 housing units.

== Geography ==
According to the 2021 census gazetteer files, Barren Township has a total area of 36.17 square miles (93.68 km^{2}), of which 20.96 square miles (54.29 km^{2}) (or 57.94%) is land and 15.21 square miles (39.39 km^{2}) (or 42.06%) is water.

=== Cities, towns, villages ===
- Sesser (east edge)

=== Cemeteries ===
The township contains Hammond Cemetery.

=== Major highways ===
- Illinois Route 154

=== Lakes ===
- Rend Lake

=== Landmarks ===
- Wayne Fitzgerrell State Recreation Area

== Demographics ==
As of the 2020 census there were 551 people, 166 households, and 88 families residing in the township. The population density was 15.23 inhabitants per square mile (5.88/km^{2}). There were 248 housing units at an average density of 6.86 per square mile (2.65/km^{2}). The racial makeup of the township was 94.37% White, 0.54% African American, 0.54% Native American, 0.36% Asian, 0.00% Pacific Islander, 0.00% from other races, and 4.17% from two or more races. Hispanic or Latino of any race were 1.27% of the population.

There were 166 households, out of which 15.10% had children under the age of 18 living with them, 36.14% were married couples living together, 9.04% had a female householder with no spouse present, and 46.99% were non-families. 47.00% of all households were made up of individuals, and 10.80% had someone living alone who was 65 years of age or older. The average household size was 1.93 and the average family size was 2.49.

The township's age distribution consisted of 12.8% under the age of 18, 3.4% from 18 to 24, 16.9% from 25 to 44, 35.3% from 45 to 64, and 31.6% who were 65 years of age or older. The median age was 55.7 years. For every 100 females, there were 107.8 males. For every 100 females age 18 and over, there were 121.4 males.

The median income for a household in the township was $48,106, and the median income for a family was $49,773. Males had a median income of $47,784 versus $27,303 for females. The per capita income for the township was $27,784. About 21.6% of families and 19.1% of the population were below the poverty line, including 24.4% of those under age 18 and 19.8% of those age 65 or over.

Historical population
| Census | Pop. | Note | %± |
|---|---|---|---|
| 2000 | 500 | | — |
| 2010 | 496 | | −0.8% |
| 2020 | 551 | | 11.1% |
U.S. Decennial Census

== School districts ==
- Sesser-Valier Community Unit School District 196

== Political districts ==
- Illinois's 12th congressional district
- State House District 117
- State Senate District 59

== Adjacent townships ==
- Elk Prairie Township, Jefferson County (north)
- Spring Garden Township, Jefferson County (northeast)
- Ewing Township (east)
- Benton Township (southeast)
- Browning Township (south)
- Tyrone Township (southwest)
- Goode Township (west)
- Bald Hill Township, Jefferson County (northwest)
