= Moore's Prairie Township, Jefferson County, Illinois =

Moore's Prairie Township
- Township
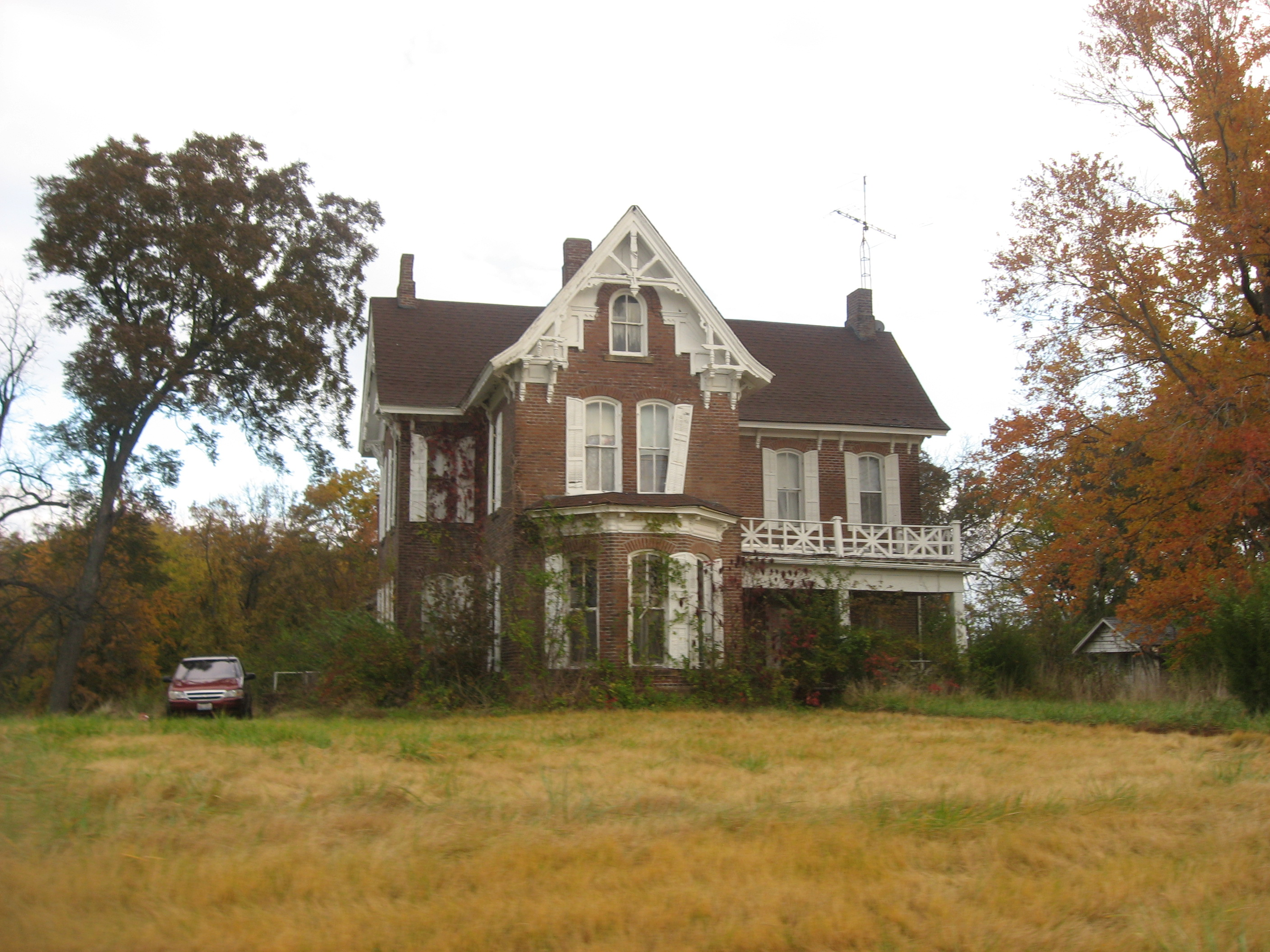
- The C. H. Judd House, a historic site in the township

- Location in Jefferson County

- Jefferson County's location in Illinois
- Coordinates: 38°10′N 88°45′W
- Country: United States
- State: Illinois
- County: Jefferson

Area
  - Total: 36.63 sq mi (94.9 km^{2})
  - Land: 36.40 sq mi (94.3 km^{2})
  - Water: 0.23 sq mi (0.60 km^{2}) 0.62%
- Elevation: 499 ft (152 m)

Population (2020)
  - Total: 372
  - Density: 10.2/sq mi (3.95/km^{2})
- Time zone: UTC-6 (CST)
  - Summer (DST): UTC-5 (CDT)
- ZIP codes: 62810, 62846
- FIPS code: 17-081-50348

Moore's Prairie Township is one of sixteen townships in Jefferson County, Illinois, USA. As of the 2020 census, its population was 372 and it contained 147 housing units.

== Geography ==
According to the 2021 census gazetteer files, Moores Prairie Township has a total area of 36.63 square miles (94.87 km^{2}), of which 36.40 square miles (94.28 km^{2}) (or 99.38%) is land and 0.23 square miles (0.60 km^{2}) (or 0.62%) is water. The township is centered at 38°10'N 88°45'W (38.169,-88.754).

=== Adjacent townships ===
- Pendleton Township (north)
- Dahlgren Township, Hamilton County (east)
- Knights Prairie Township, Hamilton County (southeast)
- Northern Township, Franklin County (south)
- Ewing Township, Franklin County (southwest)
- Spring Garden Township (west)
- Dodds Township (northwest)

== Demographics ==
As of the 2020 census there were 372 people, 105 households, and 92 families residing in the township. The population density was 10.16 inhabitants per square mile (3.92/km^{2}). There were 147 housing units at an average density of 4.01 per square mile (1.55/km^{2}). The racial makeup of the township was 97.04% White, 0.27% African American, 0.54% Native American, 0.00% Asian, 0.00% Pacific Islander, 0.00% from other races, and 2.15% from two or more races. Hispanic or Latino of any race were 1.88% of the population.

There were 105 households, out of which 35.20% had children under the age of 18 living with them, 80.95% were married couples living together, 6.67% had a female householder with no spouse present, and 12.38% were non-families. 12.40% of all households were made up of individuals, and 12.40% had someone living alone who was 65 years of age or older. The average household size was 2.47 and the average family size was 2.67.

The township's age distribution consisted of 21.6% under the age of 18, 8.5% from 18 to 24, 11.2% from 25 to 44, 33.5% from 45 to 64, and 25.1% who were 65 years of age or older. The median age was 49.5 years. For every 100 females, there were 105.6 males. For every 100 females age 18 and over, there were 103.0 males.

The median income for a household in the township was $87,813, and the median income for a family was $90,000. Males had a median income of $38,333 versus $19,125 for females. The per capita income for the township was $31,155. About 3.3% of families and 4.6% of the population were below the poverty line, including 5.4% of those under age 18 and none of those age 65 or over.

Historical population
| Census | Pop. | Note | %± |
|---|---|---|---|
| 2000 | 398 | | — |
| 2010 | 347 | | −12.8% |
| 2020 | 372 | | 7.2% |
U.S. Decennial Census

== Cemeteries ==
- Cochrane Cemetery
- Four Graves Cemetery
- Grothoff Cemetery
- Wilbanks Cemetery
- Lowery Hill Cemetery
- One Grave Cemetery
- Shelton Cemetery
- Sugar Camp Cemetery

=== Major highways ===
- Illinois Route 142

== School districts ==
- Hamilton County Community Unit School District 10

== Political districts ==
- Illinois's 12th congressional district
- State House District 107
- State Senate District 54
