= Grand Prairie Township, Jefferson County, Illinois =

Grand Prairie Township
- Township
- Location in Jefferson County

- Jefferson County's location in Illinois
- Coordinates: 38°26′N 89°5′W
- Country: United States
- State: Illinois
- County: Jefferson

Area
  - Total: 36.32 sq mi (94.1 km^{2})
  - Land: 36.21 sq mi (93.8 km^{2})
  - Water: 0.11 sq mi (0.28 km^{2}) 0.31%
- Elevation: 531 ft (162 m)

Population (2020)
  - Total: 900
  - Density: 25/sq mi (9.6/km^{2})
- Time zone: UTC-6 (CST)
  - Summer (DST): UTC-5 (CDT)
- ZIP codes: 62801, 62830, 62877, 62893, 62898
- FIPS code: 17-081-30731

Grand Prairie Township is one of sixteen townships in Jefferson County, Illinois, United States. As of the 2020 census, its population was 900 and it contained 389 housing units.

== Geography ==
According to the 2021 census gazetteer files, Grand Prairie Township (T1S R1E) has a total area of 36.32 square miles (94.07 km^{2}), of which 36.21 square miles (93.78 km^{2}) (or 99.69%) is land and 0.11 square miles (0.28 km^{2}) (or 0.31%) is water.

=== Cities, towns, villages ===
- Centralia (south edge)

=== Unincorporated towns ===
- Baldwin Heights at 38.450°N 89.145°W
- Cravat at 38.424°N 89.093°W

(This list is based on USGS data and may include former settlements.)

=== Adjacent townships ===
- Centralia Township, Marion County (north)
- Raccoon Township, Marion County (northeast)
- Rome Township (east)
- Shiloh Township (southeast)
- Casner Township (south)
- Richview Township, Washington County (southwest)
- Irvington Township, Washington County (west)

=== Cemeteries ===
The township contains these four cemeteries: Fouts, Gaston, Gilead and Piskey.

=== Major highways ===
- Interstate 64
- U.S. Route 51

=== Airports and landing strips ===
- Prairie Airport

=== Lakes ===
- Superior Lake

== Demographics ==
As of the 2020 census there were 900 people, 350 households, and 272 families residing in the township. The population density was 24.78 inhabitants per square mile (9.57/km^{2}). There were 389 housing units at an average density of 10.71 per square mile (4.14/km^{2}). The racial makeup of the township was 92.67% White, 1.56% African American, 0.33% Native American, 0.44% Asian, 0.00% Pacific Islander, 0.22% from other races, and 4.78% from two or more races. Hispanic or Latino of any race were 1.78% of the population.

There were 350 households, out of which 31.10% had children under the age of 18 living with them, 64.29% were married couples living together, 8.86% had a female householder with no spouse present, and 22.29% were non-families. 18.00% of all households were made up of individuals, and 7.10% had someone living alone who was 65 years of age or older. The average household size was 2.65 and the average family size was 2.96.

The township's age distribution consisted of 24.6% under the age of 18, 9.6% from 18 to 24, 22.3% from 25 to 44, 26.5% from 45 to 64, and 17.0% who were 65 years of age or older. The median age was 41.4 years. For every 100 females, there were 97.4 males. For every 100 females age 18 and over, there were 95.0 males.

The median income for a household in the township was $69,444, and the median income for a family was $76,250. Males had a median income of $41,250 versus $32,639 for females. The per capita income for the township was $26,035. About 4.0% of families and 8.9% of the population were below the poverty line, including 15.5% of those under age 18 and 1.9% of those age 65 or over.

Historical population
Census	Pop.	Note	%±
2000	1,039		—
2010	909		−12.5%
2020	900		−1.0%
U.S. Decennial Census

== Political districts ==
- Illinois' 19th congressional district
- State House District 107
- State Senate District 54
