= Casner Township, Jefferson County, Illinois =

Casner Township
- Township
- Location in Jefferson County

- Jefferson County's location in Illinois
- Coordinates: 38°21′N 89°5′W
- Country: United States
- State: Illinois
- County: Jefferson

Area
  - Total: 36.00 sq mi (93.2 km^{2})
  - Land: 35.95 sq mi (93.1 km^{2})
  - Water: 0.05 sq mi (0.13 km^{2}) 0.13%
- Elevation: 495 ft (151 m)

Population (2020)
  - Total: 1,209
  - Density: 33.63/sq mi (12.98/km^{2})
- Time zone: UTC-6 (CST)
  - Summer (DST): UTC-5 (CDT)
- ZIP codes: 62801, 62808, 62864, 62877, 62894, 62898
- FIPS code: 17-081-11670

Casner Township is one of sixteen townships in Jefferson County, Illinois, USA. As of the 2020 census, its population was 1,209 and it contained 509 housing units.

== Geography ==
According to the 2021 census gazetteer files, Casner Township has a total area of 36.00 square miles (93.24 km^{2}), of which 35.95 square miles (93.11 km^{2}) (or 99.87%) is land and 0.05 square miles (0.13 km^{2}) (or 0.13%) is water. The township is centered at 38°21'N 89°5'W (38.349,-89.088). It is traversed east–west by Interstate Route 64 and State Route 15.

=== Cities, towns, villages ===
- Woodlawn

=== Unincorporated towns ===
- Jefferson City at 38.379°N 89.043°W
- Roaches at 38.325°N 89.076°W

(This list is based on USGS data and may include former settlements.)

=== Adjacent townships ===
- Grand Prairie Township (north)
- Rome Township (northeast)
- Shiloh Township (east)
- McClellan Township (southeast)
- Blissville Township (south)
- DuBois Township, Washington County (southwest)
- Ashley Township, Washington County (west)
- Richview Township, Washington County (west)
- Irvington Township, Washington County (northwest)

=== Cemeteries ===
The township contains these three cemeteries: Locust Grove, Mount Catherine and Randolph.

=== Major highways ===
- Interstate 64
- Illinois Route 15

== Demographics ==
As of the 2020 census there were 1,209 people, 410 households, and 312 families residing in the township. The population density was 33.59 inhabitants per square mile (12.97/km^{2}). There were 509 housing units at an average density of 14.14 per square mile (5.46/km^{2}). The racial makeup of the township was 94.21% White, 0.83% African American, 0.08% Native American, 0.33% Asian, 0.00% Pacific Islander, 0.33% from other races, and 4.22% from two or more races. Hispanic or Latino of any race were 1.16% of the population.

There were 410 households, out of which 33.40% had children under the age of 18 living with them, 50.24% were married couples living together, 12.93% had a female householder with no spouse present, and 23.90% were non-families. 18.30% of all households were made up of individuals, and 6.10% had someone living alone who was 65 years of age or older. The average household size was 2.56 and the average family size was 2.82.

The township's age distribution consisted of 24.0% under the age of 18, 6.6% from 18 to 24, 18.1% from 25 to 44, 38.9% from 45 to 64, and 12.2% who were 65 years of age or older. The median age was 45.7 years. For every 100 females, there were 94.6 males. For every 100 females age 18 and over, there were 99.0 males.

The median income for a household in the township was $66,771, and the median income for a family was $77,500. Males had a median income of $52,734 versus $24,821 for females. The per capita income for the township was $30,329. About 9.3% of families and 15.5% of the population were below the poverty line, including 25.5% of those under age 18 and 7.8% of those age 65 or over.

Historical population
Census	Pop.	Note	%±
2000	1,256		—
2010	1,239		−1.4%
2020	1,209		−2.4%
U.S. Decennial Census

== Political districts ==
- Illinois' 19th congressional district
- State House District 107
- State Senate District 54
