= Bakerville, Illinois =

Bakerville, Illinois may refer to:

- Bakerville, Jefferson County, Illinois, an unincorporated community in Jefferson County
- Bakerville, Logan County, Illinois, an unincorporated community in Logan County
