= Blissville Township, Jefferson County, Illinois =

Blissville Township
- Township
- Location in Jefferson County

- Jefferson County's location in Illinois
- Coordinates: 38°15′N 89°5′W
- Country: United States
- State: Illinois
- County: Jefferson

Area
  - Total: 34.75 sq mi (90.0 km^{2})
  - Land: 34.71 sq mi (89.9 km^{2})
  - Water: 0.03 sq mi (0.078 km^{2}) 0.10%
- Elevation: 469 ft (143 m)

Population (2020)
  - Total: 400
  - Density: 12/sq mi (4.4/km^{2})
- Time zone: UTC-6 (CST)
  - Summer (DST): UTC-5 (CDT)
- ZIP codes: 62808, 62883, 62894, 62898
- FIPS code: 17-081-06496

Blissville Township is one of sixteen townships in Jefferson County, Illinois, USA. As of the 2020 census, its population was 400 and it contained 175 housing units.

== Geography ==
According to the 2021 census gazetteer files, Blissville Township has a total area of 34.75 square miles (90.00 km^{2}), of which 34.71 square miles (89.90 km^{2}) (or 99.90%) is land and 0.03 square miles (0.08 km^{2}) (or 0.10%) is water. The township is centered at 38°15'N 89°5'W (38.257,-89.088).

=== Cities, towns, villages ===
- Waltonville (northwest quarter)

=== Unincorporated towns ===
- Williamsburg at 38.228°N 89.059°W

(This list is based on USGS data and may include former settlements.)

=== Adjacent townships ===
- Casner Township (north)
- McClellan Township (east)
- Elk Prairie Township (southeast)
- Bald Hill Township (south)
- DuBois Township, Washington County (west)
- Ashley Township, Washington County (northwest)

=== Cemeteries ===
The township contains these six cemeteries: Gilbert, Knob Prairie, Minson, Mount Zion, Quinn and Taylor.

== Demographics ==
As of the 2020 census there were 400 people, 236 households, and 171 families residing in the township. The population density was 11.51 inhabitants per square mile (4.44/km^{2}). There were 175 housing units at an average density of 5.04 per square mile (1.95/km^{2}). The racial makeup of the township was 97.75% White, 0.25% African American, 0.25% Native American, 0.00% Asian, 0.00% Pacific Islander, 0.25% from other races, and 1.50% from two or more races. Hispanic or Latino of any race were 0.75% of the population.

There were 236 households, out of which 41.10% had children under the age of 18 living with them, 47.03% were married couples living together, 25.42% had a female householder with no spouse present, and 27.54% were non-families. 8.90% of all households were made up of individuals, and 4.70% had someone living alone who was 65 years of age or older. The average household size was 3.08 and the average family size was 3.29.

The township's age distribution consisted of 34.0% under the age of 18, 4.1% from 18 to 24, 29.6% from 25 to 44, 24.9% from 45 to 64, and 7.3% who were 65 years of age or older. The median age was 38.2 years. For every 100 females, there were 121.3 males. For every 100 females age 18 and over, there were 99.6 males.

The median income for a household in the township was $56,860, and the median income for a family was $49,135. Males had a median income of $56,538 versus $21,914 for females. The per capita income for the township was $23,633. About 28.1% of families and 32.4% of the population were below the poverty line, including 57.5% of those under age 18 and none of those age 65 or over.

Historical population
Census	Pop.	Note	%±
2000	392		—
2010	404		3.1%
2020	400		−1.0%
U.S. Decennial Census

== School districts ==
- Waltonville Community Unit School District 1

== Political districts ==
- Illinois's 19th congressional district
- State House District 107
- State Senate District 54
