= Spring Garden Township =

Spring Garden Township may refer to the following townships in the United States:

- Spring Garden Township, Jefferson County, Illinois
- Spring Garden Township, Pennsylvania
