= Texico =

Texico is the name of some places in the United States:

- Texico, Illinois
- Texico, New Mexico

== See also ==
- Texaco
- The Texican
