= Dodds Township, Jefferson County, Illinois =

Dodds Township
- Township
- Location in Jefferson County

- Jefferson County's location in Illinois
- Coordinates: 38°15′N 88°52′W
- Country: United States
- State: Illinois
- County: Jefferson

Area
  - Total: 36.98 sq mi (95.8 km^{2})
  - Land: 36.78 sq mi (95.3 km^{2})
  - Water: 0.20 sq mi (0.52 km^{2}) 0.55%
- Elevation: 440 ft (134 m)

Population (2020)
  - Total: 2,690
  - Density: 73.1/sq mi (28.2/km^{2})
- Time zone: UTC-6 (CST)
  - Summer (DST): UTC-5 (CDT)
- ZIP codes: 62816, 62864, 62872
- FIPS code: 17-081-20227

Dodds Township is one of sixteen townships in Jefferson County, Illinois, USA. As of the 2020 census, its population was 2,690 and it contained 1,197 housing units.

Dodds Township bears the name of James Dodds, a pioneer settler.

== Geography ==
According to the 2021 census gazetteer files, Dodds Township has a total area of 36.98 square miles (95.78 km^{2}), of which 36.78 square miles (95.26 km^{2}) (or 99.45%) is land and 0.20 square miles (0.52 km^{2}) (or 0.55%) is water. The township is centered at 38°15'N 88°52'W (38.255,-89.875). It is traversed north–south by Interstate Route 57 and State Route 37, east–west by Interstate 64 and also by portions of State Routes 142 and 148.

=== Cities, towns, villages ===
- Mount Vernon (south edge)

=== Unincorporated towns ===
- Bakerville at 38.258°N 88.898°W
- Morganville at 38.280°N 88.902°W
- Shirley at 38.285°N 88.838°W

(This list is based on USGS data and may include former settlements.)

=== Adjacent townships ===
- Mt. Vernon Township (north)
- Pendleton Township (east)
- Moore's Prairie Township (southeast)
- Spring Garden Township (south)
- Elk Prairie Township (southwest)
- McClellan Township (west)
- Shiloh Township (northwest)

=== Cemeteries ===
The township contains these seven cemeteries: Arnold, Bethel Memorial, Cub Prairie, Hams Grove, Meddows, Old Orchard and Warren.

=== Major highways ===
- Interstate 57
- Interstate 64
- Illinois Route 37
- Illinois Route 142
- Illinois Route 148

=== Airports and landing strips ===
- Davy Jones Airport

== Demographics ==
As of the 2020 census there were 2,690 people, 967 households, and 748 families residing in the township. The population density was 72.74 inhabitants per square mile (28.09/km^{2}). There were 1,197 housing units at an average density of 32.37 per square mile (12.50/km^{2}). The racial makeup of the township was 90.33% White, 2.94% African American, 0.11% Native American, 0.71% Asian, 0.04% Pacific Islander, 0.48% from other races, and 5.39% from two or more races. Hispanic or Latino of any race were 1.00% of the population.

There were 967 households, out of which 35.60% had children under the age of 18 living with them, 55.53% were married couples living together, 15.62% had a female householder with no spouse present, and 22.65% were non-families. 19.40% of all households were made up of individuals, and 8.70% had someone living alone who was 65 years of age or older. The average household size was 2.69 and the average family size was 3.01.

The township's age distribution consisted of 26.8% under the age of 18, 7.6% from 18 to 24, 24% from 25 to 44, 24.8% from 45 to 64, and 16.9% who were 65 years of age or older. The median age was 33.4 years. For every 100 females, there were 112.8 males. For every 100 females age 18 and over, there were 98.9 males.

The median income for a household in the township was $56,417, and the median income for a family was $63,269. Males had a median income of $37,275 versus $22,879 for females. The per capita income for the township was $28,523. About 11.4% of families and 15.7% of the population were below the poverty line, including 29.7% of those under age 18 and 4.1% of those age 65 or over.

Historical population
Census	Pop.	Note	%±
2000	2,704		—
2010	2,647		−2.1%
2020	2,690		1.6%
U.S. Decennial Census

== Political districts ==
- Illinois' 19th congressional district
- State House District 107
- State Senate District 54
