= Waltonville, Illinois =

- Village
- Location of Waltonville in Jefferson County, Illinois
- Coordinates: 38°12′51″N 89°02′17″W
- Country: United States
- State: Illinois
- County: Jefferson
- Townships: Bald Hill, Elk Prairie, McClellan, Blissville

Area
  - Total: 1.26 sq mi (3.27 km^{2})
  - Land: 1.24 sq mi (3.21 km^{2})
  - Water: 0.019 sq mi (0.05 km^{2})
- Elevation: 456 ft (139 m)

Population (2020)
  - Total: 408
  - Density: 330/sq mi (127/km^{2})
- Time zone: UTC-6 (CST)
  - Summer (DST): UTC-5 (CDT)
- ZIP code: 62894
- Area code: 618
- FIPS code: 17-78708
- GNIS ID: 2400091
- Website: villageofwaltonville.org

Waltonville is a village in Jefferson County, Illinois, United States. The population was 408 at the 2020 census. It is part of the Mount Vernon Micropolitan Statistical Area.

== History ==
There were a series of small settlements near Waltonville prior to its formation. In 1840, Eli Gilbert dammed Rayse Creek about a mile northeast of Waltonville, near the point where the Mt. Vernon/Pinckneyville road crossed the creek. He built a saw mill, grist mill and store at this location, which was called "Mill Town". In 1860, Knob Creek Post Office was opened there. This was in McClellan Township.

In 1867, a settlement called Williamsburg was started, about a half mile west of Mill Town. This was in Knob Prairie, Blissville Township, just to the north of the present town of Waltonville. Knob Prairie owes its name to a steep hill, or knob, that arises just to the northwest of Waltonville. The town's water tower sits atop the knob.

Williamsburg was platted in 1867. It was possibly named for the surveyor, J. D. Williams. Williamsburg was at the intersection of the Shawneetown/Nashville and Mt. Vernon/Pinckneyville roads, neither of which exist any more. After the post office refused to recognize the "Williamsburg" name, it was called the "Laur Post Office", after Capt. Joseph Laur, who commanded a local company in the Civil War.

Waltonville, to the south of the knob, started as a small store owned by Rob Mannen. The town was named for his mother, Eliza A. Walton Mannen. The town took off in 1893 with the completion of a rail line from Mt. Vernon to Chester. Williamsburg moved down to the new rail depot. The rail line is now part of the Union Pacific system.

The Universalist Church existed in Williamsburg prior to 1870, and moved to Waltonville before 1906. This church was still operating as late as 1980. Waltonville was for many years the smallest town in the United States to have a Universalist Church. This may be another reflection of the numerous obscure ethnic groups that maintained an identity in the rural coal fields of Southern Illinois.

Many underground coal mines were opened near Waltonville. Immigrants came to work these mines, mainly from Poland. By the 1950s, the rural areas west of Waltonville were predominantly Polish, and the main language spoken was Polish. That language slowly faded with the advent of television. Today, only a few people speak any Polish. Many still identify as Polish, though, and they continue to attend St. Barbara's Catholic Church in nearby Scheller.

== Geography ==
Waltonville is located in southwestern Jefferson County. Illinois Route 148 passes through the southeast part of the village, leading northeast 13 miles (21 km) to Mount Vernon, the county seat, and south 8 miles (13 km) to Sesser.

According to the 2021 census gazetteer files, Waltonville has a total area of 1.26 square miles (3.26 km^{2}), of which 1.24 square miles (3.21 km^{2}) (or 98.33%) is land and 0.02 square miles (0.05 km^{2}) (or 1.67%) is water.

Waltonville is in the northeast corner of Bald Hill Township, the southeast corner of Blissville Township, the southeast corner of McClellan Township, and the northwest corner of Elk Prairie Township. Most of the developed parts of the village are in Bald Hill and Elk Prairie townships.

Blissville Township was named in honor of Augustus Bliss, who lived in nearby Casner Township, and who started a settlement in 1841. Blissville was located about 8 miles (13 km) northwest of Waltonville. Bliss caught the gold fever in 1849, but died of cholera on his way to California.

== Demographics ==
Historical population
Census	Pop.	Note	%±
1920	421		—
1930	423		0.5%
1940	434		2.6%
1950	459		5.8%
1960	394		−14.2%
1970	381		−3.3%
1980	414		8.7%
1990	396		−4.3%
2000	422		6.6%
2010	434		2.8%
2020	408		−6.0%
U.S. Decennial Census

As of the 2020 census, there were 408 people, 178 households, and 126 families residing in the village. The population density was 323.55 inhabitants per square mile (124.92/km^{2}). There were 192 housing units at an average density of 152.26 per square mile (58.79/km^{2}). The racial makeup of the village was 92.65% White, 2.21% African American, 0.25% Native American, 0.00% Asian, 0.00% Pacific Islander, 0.74% from other races, and 4.17% from two or more races. Hispanic or Latino of any race were 0.74% of the population.

There were 178 households, out of which 30.9% had children under the age of 18 living with them, 47.19% were married couples living together, 17.98% had a female householder with no husband present, and 29.21% were non-families. 24.72% of all households were made up of individuals, and 10.11% had someone living alone who was 65 years of age or older. The average household size was 2.74 and the average family size was 2.32.

The village's age distribution consisted of 19.6% under the age of 18, 8.5% from 18 to 24, 20% from 25 to 44, 31.7% from 45 to 64, and 20.1% who were 65 years of age or older. The median age was 46.4 years. For every 100 females, there were 110.7 males. For every 100 females age 18 and over, there were 112.8 males.

The median income for a household in the village was $46,563, and the median income for a family was $56,250. Males had a median income of $36,000 versus $22,386 for females. The per capita income for the village was $23,932. About 15.1% of families and 17.4% of the population were below the poverty line, including 35.8% of those under age 18 and 8.4% of those age 65 or over.
