= Harmony, Illinois =

Harmony, Illinois may refer to:

- Harmony, Jefferson County, Illinois, an unincorporated community in Jefferson County
- Harmony, McHenry County, Illinois, an unincorporated community in McHenry County
