= Shiloh Township, Jefferson County, Illinois =

Shiloh Township
- Township
- Location in Jefferson County

- Jefferson County's location in Illinois
- Coordinates: 38°21′N 88°59′W
- Country: United States
- State: Illinois
- County: Jefferson

Area
  - Total: 36.30 sq mi (94.0 km^{2})
  - Land: 36.22 sq mi (93.8 km^{2})
  - Water: 0.07 sq mi (0.18 km^{2}) 0.20%
- Elevation: 453 ft (138 m)

Population (2020)
  - Total: 6,524
  - Density: 180.1/sq mi (69.55/km^{2})
- Time zone: UTC-6 (CST)
  - Summer (DST): UTC-5 (CDT)
- ZIP codes: 62864, 62894, 62898
- FIPS code: 17-081-69511
- Website: www.shilohtownshipil.gov

Shiloh Township is one of sixteen townships in Jefferson County, Illinois, USA. As of the 2020 census, its population was 6,524 and it contained 3,316 housing units.

== Geography ==
According to the 2021 census gazetteer files, Shiloh Township has a total area of 36.30 square miles (94.02 km^{2}), of which 36.22 square miles (93.81 km^{2}) (or 99.80%) is land and 0.07 square miles (0.18 km^{2}) (or 0.20%) is water. The township is centered at 38°21′N 88°59′W (38.344,-88.982). It is transversed north–south by Interstate Route 57 and east–west by Interstate Route 64 and State Route 15.

=== Cities, towns, villages ===
- Mount Vernon (west portion)
- Woodlawn (east half)

=== Unincorporated towns ===
- Drivers at 38.331°N 88.993°W
- Webster Hill Estates at 38.325°N 88.928°W

(This list is based on USGS data and may include former settlements.)

=== Adjacent townships ===
- Rome Township (north)
- Field Township (northeast)
- Mt. Vernon Township (east)
- Dodds Township (southeast)
- McClellan Township (south)
- Casner Township (west)
- Grand Prairie Township (northwest)

=== Cemeteries ===
The township contains these nine cemeteries: Memorial Garden, New Shiloh, Oddfellows, Old Shiloh, Pleasant Grove, Reynolds, Slade, Sunset Memorial and West Salem.

=== Major highways ===
- Interstate 57
- Interstate 64
- Illinois Route 15

=== Airports and landing strips ===
- Mount Vernon Bullock Heliport

=== Lakes ===
- Peckerwood Lake

== Demographics ==
As of the 2020 census there were 6,524 people, 2,897 households, and 1,686 families residing in the township. The population density was 179.73 inhabitants per square mile (69.39/km^{2}). There were 3,316 housing units at an average density of 91.35 per square mile (35.27/km^{2}). The racial makeup of the township was 84.64% White, 6.81% African American, 0.25% Native American, 2.76% Asian, 0.03% Pacific Islander, 0.43% from other races, and 5.09% from two or more races. Hispanic or Latino of any race were 1.79% of the population.

There were 2,897 households, out of which 30.70% had children under the age of 18 living with them, 36.83% were married couples living together, 17.40% had a female householder with no spouse present, and 41.80% were non-families. 38.10% of all households were made up of individuals, and 20.10% had someone living alone who was 65 years of age or older. The average household size was 2.16 and the average family size was 2.79.

The township's age distribution consisted of 23.1% under the age of 18, 6.9% from 18 to 24, 24.3% from 25 to 44, 23.6% from 45 to 64, and 21.9% who were 65 years of age or older. The median age was 40.1 years. For every 100 females, there were 85.1 males. For every 100 females age 18 and over, there were 80.6 males.

The median income for a household in the township was $42,389, and the median income for a family was $64,405. Males had a median income of $49,883 versus $26,439 for females. The per capita income for the township was $31,768. About 15.3% of families and 18.6% of the population were below the poverty line, including 28.2% of those under age 18 and 14.8% of those age 65 or over.

Historical population
Census	Pop.	Note	%±
2000	6,364		—
2010	6,620		4.0%
2020	6,524		−1.5%
U.S. Decennial Census

== Political districts ==
- Illinois' 19th congressional district
- State House District 107
- State Senate District 54
