= C. H. Judd House =

Historic house in Illinois, United States

- U.S. National Register of Historic Places
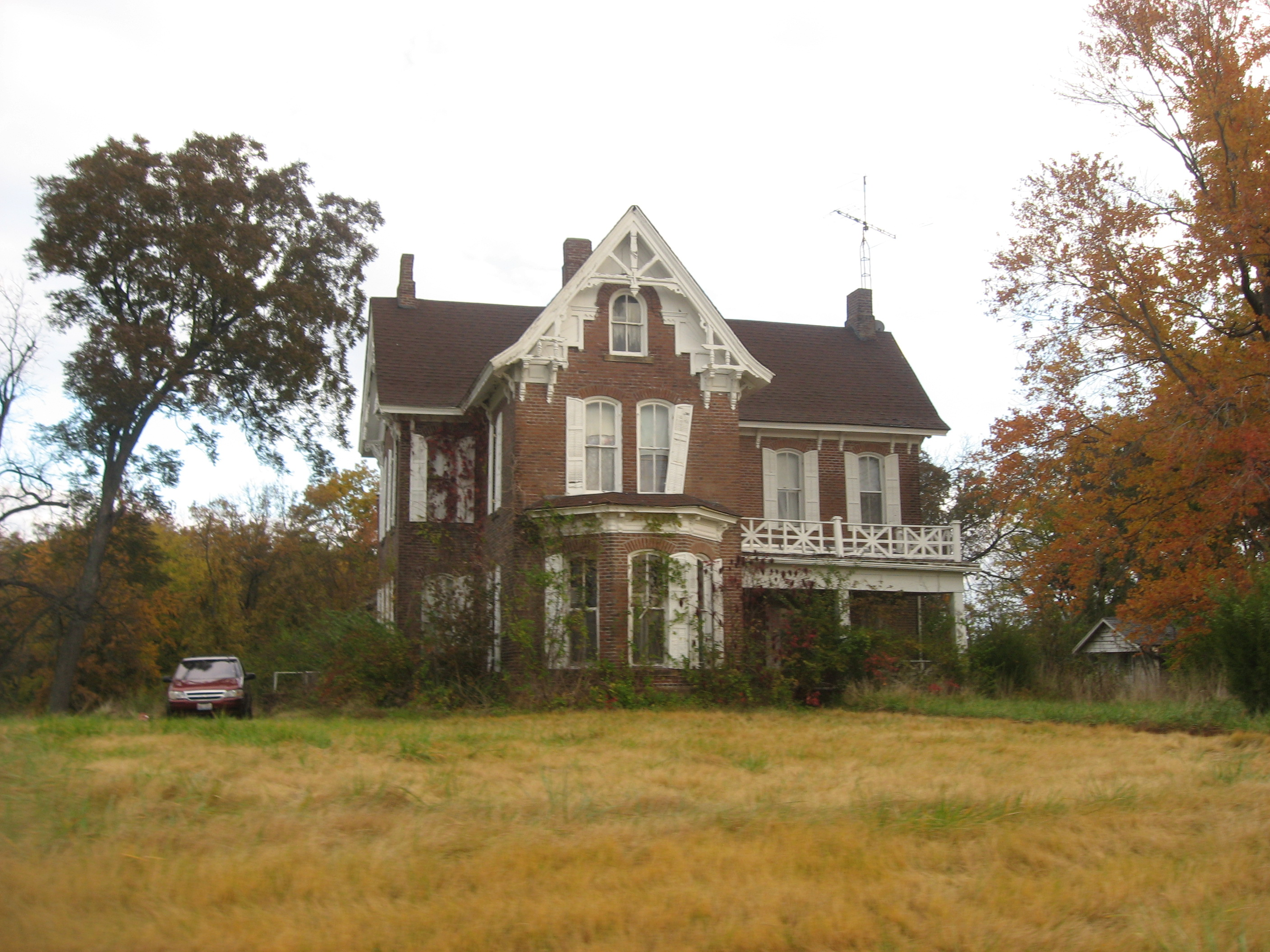
- Roadside view

- Location within Illinois Location within the United States
- Location: Belle Rive, Jefferson County, Illinois
- Coordinates: 38°9′29″N 88°45′56″W
- Area: 0.2 acres (0.081 ha)
- Built: 1881
- NRHP reference No.: 83003571
- Added to NRHP: December 8, 1983

The C. H. Judd House is a historic farmhouse located in rural Jefferson County, Illinois, near the village of Belle Rive. The brick Victorian home was constructed in 1881. Most farmhouses constructed in Jefferson County in the 1880s were frame buildings, and few houses were built of sturdier brick. Furthermore, the majority of the brick farmhouses were either destroyed in an 1888 tornado or demolished, and the Judd House is the only surviving brick farmhouse from the era. The house was the home of C. H. Judd, a wealth farmer and local politician.

The Judd House has been listed on the National Register of Historic Places since 1983. It is one of two sites on the National Register in Jefferson County, the other being the 5th District Appellate Court in Mount Vernon.

As of the summer of 2008, it has been recently purchased by Brian and Zhonette Boots who are planning to renovate the house, barn and grounds into Chateau Belle Rive Lavender Farm and Vineyard. The opening of the grounds is set for the spring of 2009.

In the early 1990s the farmhouse was operated as Enchanted Crest Bed and Breakfast.
