= Irvington Township =

Irvington Township may refer to the following townships in the United States:

- Irvington Township, Washington County, Illinois
- Irvington Township, New Jersey in Essex County
