= Aetna Township, Logan County, Illinois =

Coordinates: 40°05′22″N 89°11′41″W

Aetna Township
- Township
- Location in Logan County

- Logan County's location in Illinois
- Country: United States
- State: Illinois
- County: Logan
- Established: November 7, 1865

Area
  - Total: 34.66 sq mi (89.8 km^{2})
  - Land: 34.66 sq mi (89.8 km^{2})
  - Water: 0 sq mi (0 km^{2}) 0.01%

Population (2020)
  - Total: 476
  - Density: 13.7/sq mi (5.30/km^{2})
- Time zone: UTC-6 (CST)
  - Summer (DST): UTC-5 (CDT)
- FIPS code: 17-107-00360
- Website: www.aetnatownshipil.com

Aetna Township is located in Logan County, Illinois. As of the 2020 census, its population was 476 and it contained 212 housing units. Chestnut, Illinois and Bakerville, Illinois are the only communities in the township.

Aetna Township most likely derives its name from Mount Etna.

== Geography ==
According to the 2021 census gazetteer files, Aetna Township has a total area of 34.66 square miles (89.77 km^{2}), of which 34.66 square miles (89.77 km^{2}) (or 99.99%) is land and 0.00 square miles (0.00 km^{2}) (or 0.01%) is water.

== Demographics ==
Historical population
Census	Pop.	Note	%±
2000	524		—
2010	535		2.1%
2020	476		−11.0%

As of the 2020 census there were 476 people, 99 households, and 35 families residing in the township. The population density was 13.73 inhabitants per square mile (5.30/km^{2}). There were 212 housing units at an average density of 6.12 per square mile (2.36/km^{2}). The racial makeup of the township was 96.43% White, 0.00% African American, 0.00% Native American, 0.21% Asian, 0.00% Pacific Islander, 0.63% from other races, and 2.73% from two or more races. Hispanic or Latino of any race were 1.26% of the population.

There were 99 households, out of which 7.10% had children under the age of 18 living with them, 28.28% were married couples living together, 7.07% had a female householder with no spouse present, and 64.65% were non-families. 43.40% of all households were made up of individuals, and 15.20% had someone living alone who was 65 years of age or older. The average household size was 1.64 and the average family size was 1.94.

According to the 2020 American Community Survey, township's age distribution consisted of 6.2% under the age of 18, 34.6% from 18 to 24, 17.3% from 25 to 44, 16.1% from 45 to 64, and 25.9% who were 65 years of age or older. The median age was 38.1 years. For every 100 females, there were 108.8 males. For every 100 females age 18 and over, there were 102.8 males.

The median income for a family was $94,792. Males had a median income of $37,083 versus $32,727 for females. The per capita income for the township was $37,449. About 0.0% of families and 16.0% of the population were below the poverty line, including 0.0% of those under age 18 and 16.7% of those age 65 or over.
