= Bonnie, Illinois =

Bonnie
- Village
- Location of Bonnie in Jefferson County, Illinois.
- Coordinates: 38°12′11″N 88°54′24″W
- Country: United States
- State: Illinois
- County: Jefferson
- Township: Spring Garden

Area
  - Total: 1.27 sq mi (3.30 km^{2})
  - Land: 1.27 sq mi (3.30 km^{2})
  - Water: 0 sq mi (0.00 km^{2})
- Elevation: 440 ft (130 m)

Population (2020)
  - Total: 374
  - Density: 293.2/sq mi (113.22/km^{2})
- Time zone: UTC-6 (CST)
  - Summer (DST): UTC-5 (CDT)
- Zip code: 62816
- Area code: 618
- FIPS code: 17-07263
- GNIS ID: 2398152
- Website: www.villageofbonnie.com

Bonnie is a village located in the southern part of Jefferson County, Illinois. Bonnie had a population of 374 in the 2020 census. It is part of the Mount Vernon Micropolitan Statistical Area.

== History ==
The first settlement in this area was Spring Garden, about four miles southeast of Bonnie. There were several springs in the area. Early in the 19th century, Uriah Compton walled them up and built a resort called "Compton's Springs". In 1848, the village of Spring Garden was platted next to the resort. Spring Garden grew rapidly, becoming the second largest settlement in the county, even having a high school by 1888. In 1905, however, the Chicago and Eastern Illinois Railroad was built about three miles to the west. Spring Garden began a long decline as the business and population shifted to the rail depots at Bonnie and Ina. George Washington Hayes (1842–1927) donated some of the land originally making up Bonnie.

== Geography ==
According to the 2021 census gazetteer files, Bonnie has a total area of 1.28 square miles (3.32 km^{2}), all land.

== Demographics ==
Historical population
Census	Pop.	Note	%±
1940	177		—
1950	257		45.2%
1960	215		−16.3%
1970	314		46.0%
1980	452		43.9%
1990	411		−9.1%
2000	424		3.2%
2010	397		−6.4%
2020	374		−5.8%
U.S. Decennial Census

As of the 2020 census there were 374 people, 176 households, and 116 families residing in the village. The population density was 293.33 inhabitants per square mile (113.26/km^{2}). There were 193 housing units at an average density of 151.37 per square mile (58.44/km^{2}). The racial makeup of the village was 91.71% White, 0.00% African American, 0.27% Native American, 0.00% Asian, 0.00% Pacific Islander, 0.27% from other races, and 7.75% from two or more races. Hispanic or Latino of any race were 0.80% of the population.

There were 176 households, out of which 32.4% had children under the age of 18 living with them, 50.57% were married couples living together, 10.80% had a female householder with no husband present, and 34.09% were non-families. 27.84% of all households were made up of individuals, and 13.07% had someone living alone who was 65 years of age or older. The average household size was 2.99 and the average family size was 2.50.

The village's age distribution consisted of 22.0% under the age of 18, 3.2% from 18 to 24, 29.1% from 25 to 44, 24.8% from 45 to 64, and 20.9% who were 65 years of age or older. The median age was 41.5 years. For every 100 females, there were 78.1 males. For every 100 females age 18 and over, there were 80.5 males.

The median income for a household in the village was $59,000, and the median income for a family was $65,000. Males had a median income of $44,375 versus $28,125 for females. The per capita income for the village was $26,466. About 10.3% of families and 11.5% of the population were below the poverty line, including 17.2% of those under age 18 and 9.8% of those age 65 or over.
