= Rome Township, Jefferson County, Illinois =

Rome Township
- Township
- Location in Jefferson County

- Jefferson County's location in Illinois
- Coordinates: 38°26′N 88°59′W
- Country: United States
- State: Illinois
- County: Jefferson

Area
  - Total: 36.31 sq mi (94.0 km^{2})
  - Land: 36.26 sq mi (93.9 km^{2})
  - Water: 0.05 sq mi (0.13 km^{2}) 0.15%
- Elevation: 528 ft (161 m)

Population (2020)
  - Total: 1,710
  - Density: 47.2/sq mi (18.2/km^{2})
- Time zone: UTC-6 (CST)
  - Summer (DST): UTC-5 (CDT)
- ZIP codes: 62830, 62864, 62889, 62893, 62898
- FIPS code: 17-081-65377

Rome Township is one of sixteen townships in Jefferson County, Illinois, USA. As of the 2020 census, its population was 1,710 and it contained 767 housing units.

== Geography ==
According to the 2021 census gazetteer files, Rome Township has a total area of 36.31 square miles (94.04 km^{2}), of which 36.26 square miles (93.91 km^{2}) (or 99.85%) is land and 0.05 square miles (0.13 km^{2}) (or 0.15%) is water. The township is centered at 38°26'N 88°59'W (38.430, −88.976). It is traversed north–south by Interstate Route 57 and State Route 37.

=== Cities, towns, villages ===
- Dix

=== Unincorporated towns ===
- Boyd at 38.414°N 89.013°W

(This list is based on USGS data and may include former settlements.)

=== Adjacent townships ===
- Raccoon Township, Marion County (north)
- Haines Township, Marion County (northeast)
- Field Township (east)
- Mt. Vernon Township (southeast)
- Shiloh Township (south)
- Casner Township (southwest)
- Grand Prairie Township (west)
- Centralia Township, Marion County (northwest)

=== Cemeteries ===
The township contains these seven cemeteries: Boyd, Boyd Farm, Ebenezer, Gilead, Jennings Farm, Little Grove and Pleasant Hill.

=== Major highways ===
- Interstate 57

== Demographics ==
As of the 2020 census there were 1,710 people, 688 households, and 423 families residing in the township. The population density was 47.09 inhabitants per square mile (18.18/km^{2}). There were 767 housing units at an average density of 21.12 per square mile (8.15/km^{2}). The racial makeup of the township was 91.75% White, 1.46% African American, 0.23% Native American, 1.11% Asian, 0.00% Pacific Islander, 0.18% from other races, and 5.26% from two or more races. Hispanic or Latino of any race were 2.05% of the population.

There were 688 households, out of which 24.10% had children under the age of 18 living with them, 51.45% were married couples living together, 6.25% had a female householder with no spouse present, and 38.52% were non-families. 36.30% of all households were made up of individuals, and 16.00% had someone living alone who was 65 years of age or older. The average household size was 2.21 and the average family size was 2.88.

The township's age distribution consisted of 19.9% under the age of 18, 5.7% from 18 to 24, 24% from 25 to 44, 28.8% from 45 to 64, and 21.7% who were 65 years of age or older. The median age was 45.4 years. For every 100 females, there were 102.0 males. For every 100 females age 18 and over, there were 106.1 males.

The median income for a household in the township was $50,938, and the median income for a family was $81,250. Males had a median income of $44,333 versus $34,491 for females. The per capita income for the township was $28,846. About 1.9% of families and 8.9% of the population were below the poverty line, including 6.4% of those under age 18 and 10.0% of those age 65 or over.

Historical population
Census	Pop.	Note	%±
2000	1,739		—
2010	1,669		−4.0%
2020	1,710		2.5%
U.S. Decennial Census

== Political districts ==
- Illinois' 19th congressional district
- State House District 107
- State Senate District 54
