= Jefferson County Courthouse (Illinois) =

Local government building in the United States

Coordinates: 38°19′2″N 88°54′11″W

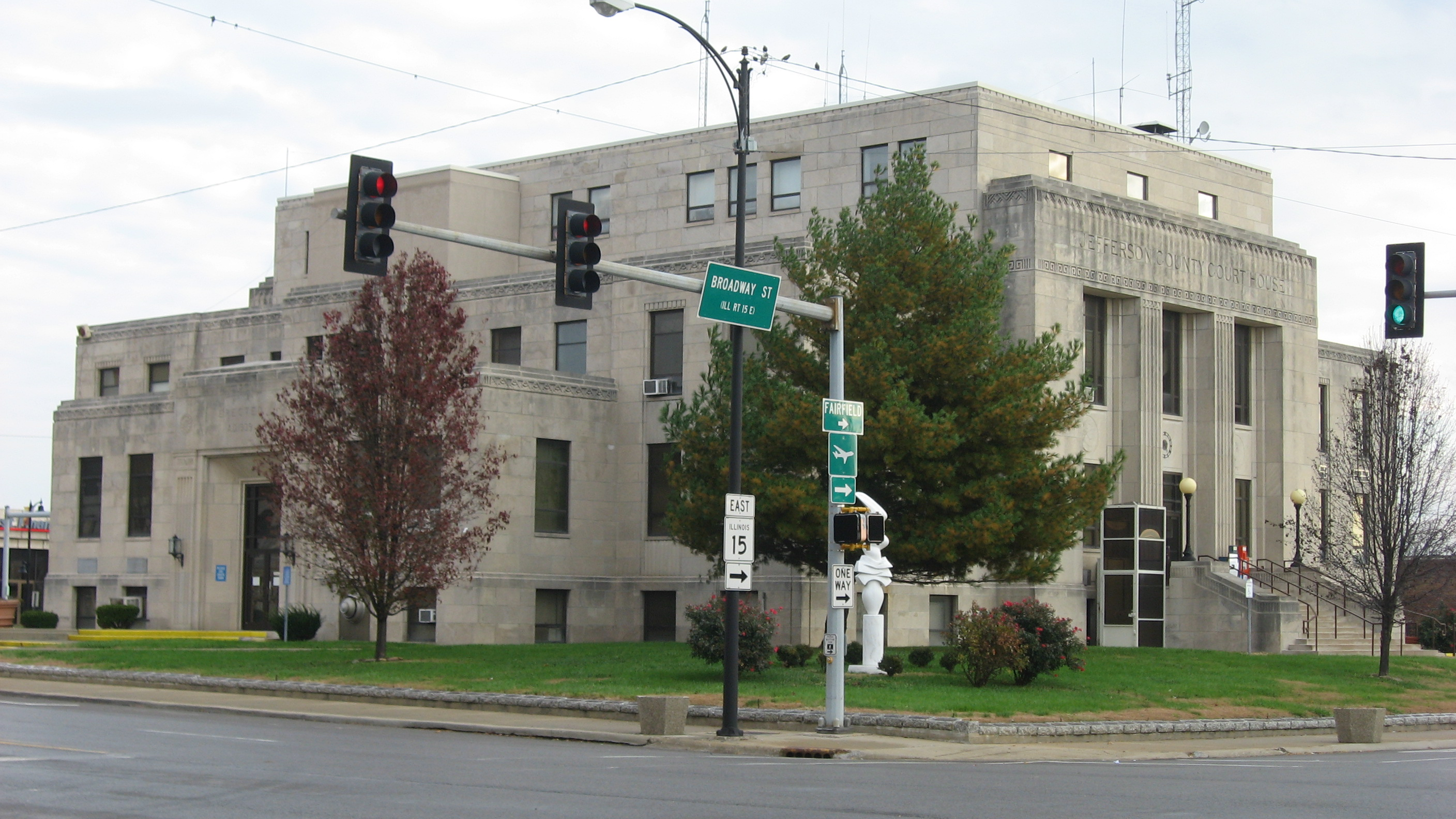
Front and eastern side of the courthouse, facing Illinois Route 15

The Jefferson County Courthouse is a government building in Mount Vernon, the county seat of Jefferson County, Illinois, United States. Built in 1939 by the federal Works Progress Administration, it is the fifth courthouse to serve Jefferson County.

== Early history ==
The first settlers in the county were Andrew Moore and his family, who arrived in 1810, but he and one of his sons were killed by Indians, and his wife and her remaining children left and settled in Equality. The first surveyors came in 1815, and some of them returned in the following year to settle in the area. The first General Assembly after statehood enacted a law in 1819 creating Jefferson County and appointed a team of commissioners to locate the county seat, provided that the landowner donate land for the foundation of the town. This law specified a location at which the commissioners were to meet, and within a week the commissioners chose the meeting location for the new county seat. A few individuals wished for a different location, but no significant dissension ever arose, and the commissioners chose "Mount Vernon" as the name of the new town, due to their reverence for George Washington.

== Previous courthouses ==
At their first meeting, the county commissioners' court ordered the construction of a courthouse, to be a simple log building 18 by 20 feet (5.5 m × 6.1 m) with a single door and window, and to be completed by September 1819. Although the contract was fulfilled, the building was quickly subjected to significant modifications: winter proved that the building could not be kept warm, and by March 1820, the county's costs had mushroomed from the original $85 to $160 merely for the difficulties of chinking the cracks between the logs, building a fireplace and chimney, and constructing a platform inside the courthouse. As primitive state law required the construction of a stray pound and a jail in a new county seat, both structures were ordered in 1820 to be built nearby.

Although this courthouse was not considered particularly safe, the county court had no desire to erect a replacement. The situation changed completely on a calm, quiet night in 1839; the first people stirring in the morning discovered that the courthouse had partially collapsed, leaving a hole on one side large enough to drive a wagon through, and the remains were pulled down with ropes. Their hands having been forced, the commissioners began making arrangements for a replacement, a square brick building 40 feet (12 m) on each side with a cupola atop the roof. Set on the public square, this building opened for use in 1840, but unfortunately for the builder, tax revenues had been poor, and he had to wait until 1841 to receive the $5,500 due him by the construction contract. This building remained until 16 March 1869, when it was consumed by an overnight fire that popular reputation ascribed to a drunken sheriff. Two years passed before its replacement was completed, and this building stood only seventeen years before a tornado destroyed it, together with most of the rest of Mount Vernon, on 19 February 1888. A replacement was finished in 1889.

== Current courthouse ==
The fifth and current courthouse is one of six Works Progress Administration county courthouses in Illinois. A concrete Art Deco structure three stories high, it features a wide staircase on the facade that provides access to the three-bay entrance. Its basement is set only partially below ground, with enough above-ground height that windows are placed throughout the basement walls. The overall plan is irregular, with the second floor being set back from the first and the third from the second. It was finished in 1939.
