= Pendleton Township, Jefferson County, Illinois =

Pendleton Township
- Township
- Location in Jefferson County

- Jefferson County's location in Illinois
- Coordinates: 38°16′N 88°45′W
- Country: United States
- State: Illinois
- County: Jefferson

Area
  - Total: 35.68 sq mi (92.4 km^{2})
  - Land: 35.49 sq mi (91.9 km^{2})
  - Water: 0.18 sq mi (0.47 km^{2}) 0.52%
- Elevation: 472 ft (144 m)

Population (2020)
  - Total: 1,191
  - Density: 33.56/sq mi (12.96/km^{2})
- Time zone: UTC-6 (CST)
  - Summer (DST): UTC-5 (CDT)
- ZIP codes: 62810, 62814, 62872
- FIPS code: 17-081-58564

Pendleton Township is one of sixteen townships in Jefferson County, Illinois, USA. As of the 2020 census, its population was 1,191 and it contained 461 housing units.

== Geography ==
According to the 2021 census gazetteer files, Pendleton Township has a total area of 35.68 square miles (92.41 km^{2}), of which 35.49 square miles (91.92 km^{2}) (or 99.48%) is land and 0.18 square miles (0.47 km^{2}) (or 0.52%) is water. The township is centered at 38°16'N 88°45'W (38.259,-89.755). It is traversed east–west by Interstate Route 64 and northwest to southeast by State Route 142.

=== Cities, towns, villages ===
- Belle Rive

=== Unincorporated towns ===
- Opdyke at 38.260°N 88.791°W

(This list is based on USGS data and may include former settlements.)

=== Extinct towns ===
- Harris Grove at 38.218°N 88.791°W
- Lynchburg at 38.287°N 88.786°W

(These towns are listed as "historical" by the USGS.)

=== Adjacent townships ===
- Webber Township (north)
- Four Mile Township, Wayne County (northeast)
- Dahlgren Township, Hamilton County (southeast)
- Moore's Prairie Township (south)
- Spring Garden Township (southwest)
- Dodds Township (west)
- Mt. Vernon Township (northwest)

=== Cemeteries ===
The township contains these nine cemeteries: Flint, Laird, New Hope, Opdyke, Rentchler, Richardson Farm, Shelton, Smith and Wall Farm.

=== Major highways ===
- Interstate 64
- Illinois Route 142

== Demographics ==
As of the 2020 census there were 1,191 people, 502 households, and 379 families residing in the township. The population density was 33.38 inhabitants per square mile (12.89/km^{2}). There were 461 housing units at an average density of 12.92 per square mile (4.99/km^{2}). The racial makeup of the township was 94.54% White, 0.42% African American, 0.17% Native American, 0.00% Asian, 0.00% Pacific Islander, 0.08% from other races, and 4.79% from two or more races. Hispanic or Latino of any race were 1.01% of the population.

There were 502 households, out of which 41.00% had children under the age of 18 living with them, 54.58% were married couples living together, 4.38% had a female householder with no spouse present, and 24.50% were non-families. 21.90% of all households were made up of individuals, and 9.80% had someone living alone who was 65 years of age or older. The average household size was 2.75 and the average family size was 3.22.

The township's age distribution consisted of 26.9% under the age of 18, 11.1% from 18 to 24, 24% from 25 to 44, 23.4% from 45 to 64, and 14.6% who were 65 years of age or older. The median age was 38.1 years. For every 100 females, there were 103.7 males. For every 100 females age 18 and over, there were 120.1 males.

The median income for a household in the township was $51,071, and the median income for a family was $49,750. Males had a median income of $40,061 versus $22,604 for females. The per capita income for the township was $22,409. About 6.1% of families and 9.8% of the population were below the poverty line, including 11.9% of those under age 18 and 5.4% of those age 65 or over.

Historical population
Census	Pop.	Note	%±
2000	1,084		—
2010	1,206		11.3%
2020	1,191		−1.2%
U.S. Decennial Census

== School districts ==
- Hamilton County Community Unit School District 10

== Political districts ==
- Illinois's 19th congressional district
- State House District 107
- State Senate District 54
