= Chestnut, Illinois =

- Census-designated place
- Location in Illinois Location in the United States
- Coordinates: 40°03′13″N 89°11′14″W
- Country: United States
- State: Illinois
- County: Logan
- Township: Aetna

Area
  - Total: 0.12 sq mi (0.32 km^{2})
  - Land: 0.12 sq mi (0.32 km^{2})
  - Water: 0 sq mi (0.00 km^{2})
- Elevation: 620 ft (190 m)

Population (2020)
  - Total: 220
  - Density: 1,782.5/sq mi (688.21/km^{2})
- Time zone: UTC-6 (CST)
  - Summer (DST): UTC-5 (CDT)
- Postal code: 62518
- Area code: 217
- FIPS code: 17-13230
- GNIS feature ID: 2628546

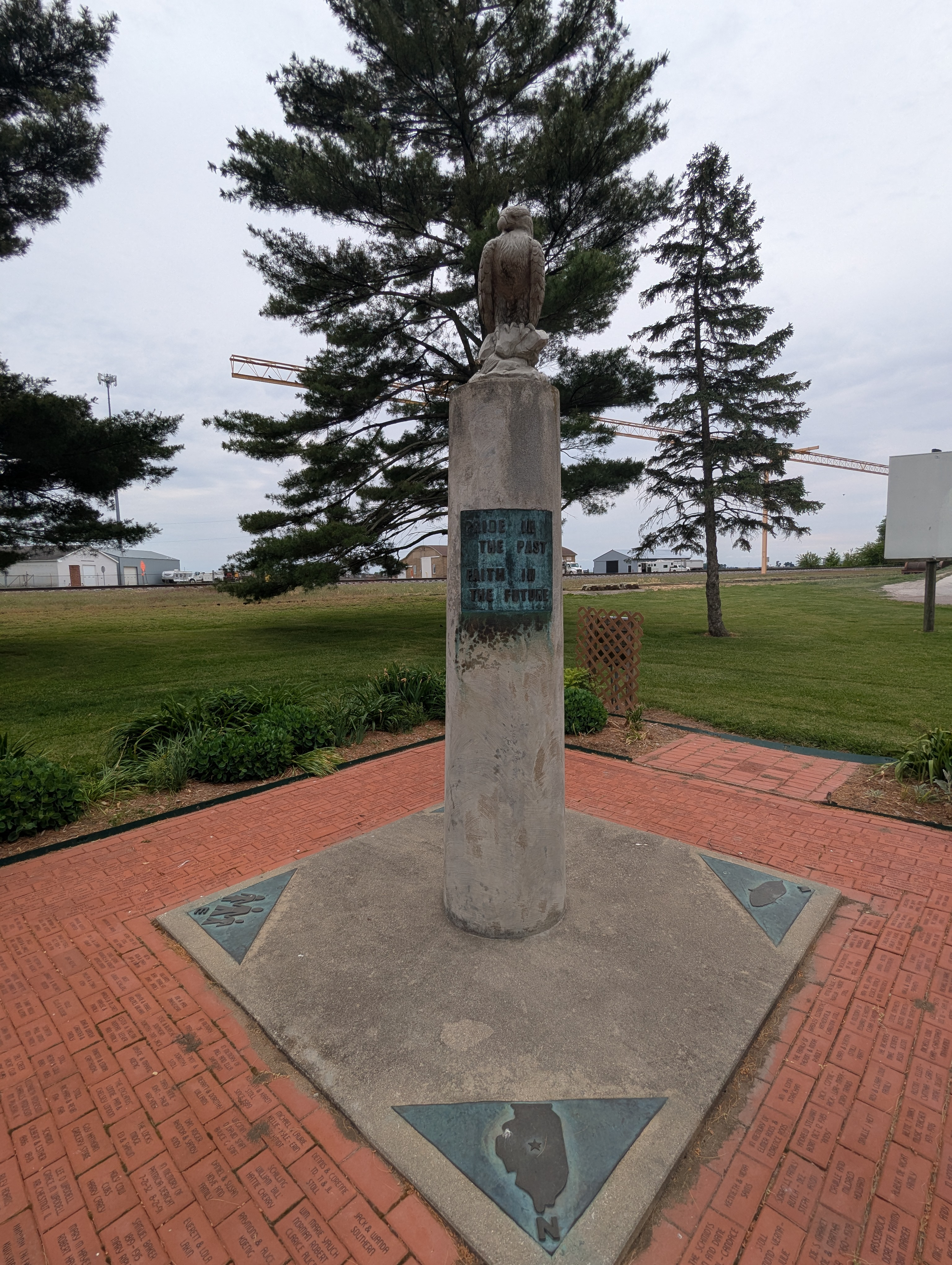
A monument located at the geographic center of Illinois, in Chestnut.

Chestnut is a census-designated place in Aetna Township, Logan County, Illinois. As of the 2020 census, its population was 220. The community is located northwest across the railroad tracks along Illinois Route 54 at Dauphin Street. Its claim to fame, for the sake of town promotion, is that it is the geographic center of the state. A small monument to this effect has been erected in a park near the southwest corner of Melvin Street and East Olive street (in §34 T19N R1W). However, the exact center of Illinois is about eight miles southwest of Chestnut, and on the other side of the town of Mount Pulaski, at 89°18.4'W 40°0.8'N.

== Geography ==
According to the 2021 census gazetteer files, Chestnut has a total area of 0.12 square miles (0.31 km^{2}), all land.

== History ==
The town of Chestnut was laid out in 1872 by David Clark in conjunction with the directors of the then newly completed Gilman, Clinton, and Springfield (later the Springfield branch of the Illinois Central railroad). The land was surveyed on April 24 of that year by Thomas G. Gardner, county surveyor. Two years prior, a town had been laid out, platted, and surveyed on the same section by William M. Allen and S. Linn Beidler. A post office had been established there under the name of Allenville in honor of Mr. Allen. On the laying out of Chestnut, the town of Allenville was abandoned. Chestnut was named in honor of one of the directors of the Gilman, Clinton, and Springfield railroad. The Britton Brothers erected the first store, having moved the building from "Yankeetown," a few miles distant; Dement and Clark erected the second store. William H. Daniels soon after started a blacksmith shop, George Lakin a drug store, and I. J. Michener erected an elevator in 1873. Mr. Lakin was postmaster and Mr. Michener was the railroad agent. In 1876, fire consumed the store and stock of Britton Brothers, at a loss of $3,000. In 1877, Dement and Clark's store and stock burned at a loss of $5,000. On Jan. 24, 1905, the general store of Gobleman & Bapst was destroyed by fire at a loss of $10,000. A Methodist church was erected in the town in 1873. An effort to incorporate Chestnut as a village was defeated at a special election in 1898.

== Demographics ==
Historical population
Census	Pop.	Note	%±
2010	246		—
2020	220		−10.6%
U.S. Decennial Census

As of the 2020 census there were 220 people, 27 households, and 7 families residing in the CDP. The population density was 1,788.62 inhabitants per square mile (690.59/km^{2}). There were 99 housing units at an average density of 804.88 per square mile (310.77/km^{2}). The racial makeup of the CDP was 95.00% White, 0.00% African American, 0.00% Native American, 0.45% Asian, 0.00% Pacific Islander, 1.36% from other races, and 3.18% from two or more races. Hispanic or Latino of any race were 2.73% of the population.

There were 27 households, out of which 25.9% had children under the age of 18 living with them, 0.00% were married couples living together, 25.93% had a female householder with no husband present, and 74.07% were non-families. 74.07% of all households were made up of individuals, and 25.93% had someone living alone who was 65 years of age or older. The average household size was 2.43 and the average family size was 1.37.

The CDP's age distribution consisted of 27.0% under the age of 18, 29.7% from 18 to 24, 18.9% from 25 to 44, 5.4% from 45 to 64, and 18.9% who were 65 years of age or older. The median age was 24.8 years. For every 100 females, there were 48.0 males. For every 100 females age 18 and over, there were 8.0 males.

The median income for a household in the CDP was $33,977, and the per capita income was $24,357.

== Education ==
It is in the Mount Pulaski Community Unit School District 23.
