= Nason, Illinois =

- City
- Location of Nason in Jefferson County, Illinois
- Coordinates: 38°10′34″N 88°57′59″W
- Country: United States
- State: Illinois
- County: Jefferson
- Township: Elk Prairie

Area
  - Total: 0.91 sq mi (2.36 km^{2})
  - Land: 0.91 sq mi (2.36 km^{2})
  - Water: 0 sq mi (0.00 km^{2})
- Elevation: 436 ft (133 m)

Population (2020)
  - Total: 199
  - Density: 218.5/sq mi (84.36/km^{2})
- Time zone: UTC-6 (CST)
  - Summer (DST): UTC-5 (CDT)
- ZIP code: 62816
- Area code: 618
- FIPS code: 17-51726
- GNIS ID: 2395157

Nason is a city in Jefferson County, Illinois, United States. The population was 199 people as of the 2020 census, making it the least populous incorporated city in the state of Illinois. It is part of the Mount Vernon Micropolitan Statistical Area.

== Geography ==
Nason is located in southern Jefferson County 12 miles (19 km) south of Mount Vernon, the county seat. It sits between the two northern arms of Rend Lake, a reservoir on the Big Muddy River.

According to the 2021 census gazetteer files, Nason has a total area of 0.91 square miles (2.36 km^{2}), all land.

== Demographics ==
Historical population
Census	Pop.	Note	%±
1930	261		—
1940	271		3.8%
1950	199		−26.6%
1960	188		−5.5%
1970	186		−1.1%
1980	272		46.2%
1990	235		−13.6%
2000	234		−0.4%
2010	236		0.9%
2020	199		−15.7%
U.S. Decennial Census

As of the 2020 census there were 199 people, 104 households, and 66 families residing in the city. The population density was 218.44 inhabitants per square mile (84.34/km^{2}). There were 111 housing units at an average density of 121.84 per square mile (47.04/km^{2}). The racial makeup of the city was 93.47% White, 0.00% African American, 1.01% Native American, 0.00% Asian, 0.00% Pacific Islander, 0.50% from other races, and 5.03% from two or more races. Hispanic or Latino of any race were 1.01% of the population.

There were 104 households, out of which 18.3% had children under the age of 18 living with them, 38.46% were married couples living together, 9.62% had a female householder with no husband present, and 36.54% were non-families. 32.69% of all households were made up of individuals, and 18.27% had someone living alone who was 65 years of age or older. The average household size was 2.64 and the average family size was 2.13.

The city's age distribution consisted of 15.8% under the age of 18, 5.9% from 18 to 24, 20.8% from 25 to 44, 35.2% from 45 to 64, and 22.2% who were 65 years of age or older. The median age was 51.4 years. For every 100 females, there were 132.6 males. For every 100 females age 18 and over, there were 135.4 males.

The median income for a household in the city was $45,833, and the median income for a family was $55,000. Males had a median income of $41,042 versus $30,208 for females. The per capita income for the city was $23,776. About 10.6% of families and 15.4% of the population were below the poverty line, including 20.0% of those under age 18 and 14.3% of those age 65 or over.
