= Divide, Illinois =

- Unincorporated community
- Location within Illinois Location within the United States
- Coordinates: 38°26′49″N 88°49′47″W
- Country: United States
- State: Illinois
- County: Jefferson
- Elevation: 541 ft (165 m)
- Time zone: UTC-6 (Central (CST))
  - Summer (DST): UTC-5 (CDT)
- Area code: 618
- GNIS feature ID: 422629

Divide is an unincorporated community in Jefferson County, in the U.S. state of Illinois.

== History ==
A post office was established at Divide in 1879, and remained in operation until 1905. The community most likely was so named on account of its location near a drainage divide.
