= Wayne Fitzgerrell =

American farmer and politician

Member of the Illinois House of Representatives

Personal details
- Party: Republican

Wayne Wright Fitzgerrell (March 17, 1908–May 11, 1965) was an American farmer and politician.

== Biography ==
Fitzgerrell was born in Sesser, Illinois and graduated from Sesser High School. He worked as a coal miner and was the foreman at the Old Ben Coal Mines in Buckner, Illinois. Fitzgerrell was a farmer and raised live stock and grain in Franklin County, Illinois. Fitzgerrell served in the Illinois House of Representatives from 1957 until his death in 1965. He was a Republican. Fitzgerell was killed in an automobile accident on U.S. Route 66 in Illinois just north of Farmersville, Illinois in Montgomery County, Illinois.

== Legacy ==
The Wayne Fitzgerrell State Recreation Area, near Benton, Illinois, was named for Fitzgerrell.
