= McClellan Township, Jefferson County, Illinois =

McClellan Township
- Township
- Location in Jefferson County

- Jefferson County's location in Illinois
- Coordinates: 38°15′N 88°59′W
- Country: United States
- State: Illinois
- County: Jefferson

Area
  - Total: 35.68 sq mi (92.4 km^{2})
  - Land: 35.63 sq mi (92.3 km^{2})
  - Water: 0.05 sq mi (0.13 km^{2}) 0.15%
- Elevation: 430 ft (131 m)

Population (2020)
  - Total: 1,269
  - Density: 35.62/sq mi (13.75/km^{2})
- Time zone: UTC-6 (CST)
  - Summer (DST): UTC-5 (CDT)
- ZIP codes: 62816, 62864, 62894, 62898
- FIPS code: 17-081-45512

McClellan Township is one of sixteen townships in Jefferson County, Illinois, USA. As of the 2020 census, its population was 1,269 and it contained 546 housing units.

== Geography ==
According to the 2021 census gazetteer files, McClellan Township has a total area of 35.68 square miles (92.41 km^{2}), of which 35.63 square miles (92.28 km^{2}) (or 99.85%) is land and 0.05 square miles (0.13 km^{2}) (or 0.15%) is water. The township is centered at 38°15'N 88°59'W (38.258,-89.986). It is traversed north–south by Interstate Route 57, from it to the east by Interstate 64 and from I-57 to the southwest by State Route 148.

=== Cities, towns, villages ===
- Mount Vernon (southwest edge)
- Waltonville (northeast quarter)

=== Unincorporated towns ===
- Marcoe at 38.267°N 88.966°W

(This list is based on USGS data and may include former settlements.)

=== Adjacent townships ===
- Shiloh Township (north)
- Dodds Township (east)
- Elk Prairie Township (south)
- Bald Hill Township (southwest)
- Blissville Township (west)
- Casner Township (northwest)

=== Cemeteries ===
The township contains these four cemeteries: Black, Rightnower, South Hickory Hill and Wolf Prairie.

=== Churches ===
The township contains several churches including:

- South Hickory Hill Christian Church
- West Long Prairie Christian Church
- Marcoe Church
- Antioch Missionary Baptist Church

=== Major highways ===
- Interstate 57
- Interstate 64
- Illinois Route 148

== Demographics ==
As of the 2020 census there were 1,269 people, 451 households, and 338 families residing in the township. The population density was 35.57 inhabitants per square mile (13.73/km^{2}). There were 546 housing units at an average density of 15.30 per square mile (5.91/km^{2}). The racial makeup of the township was 91.17% White, 2.84% African American, 0.16% Native American, 0.55% Asian, 0.00% Pacific Islander, 0.63% from other races, and 4.65% from two or more races. Hispanic or Latino of any race were 2.52% of the population.

There were 451 households, out of which 28.20% had children under the age of 18 living with them, 65.19% were married couples living together, 7.10% had a female householder with no spouse present, and 25.06% were non-families. 21.30% of all households were made up of individuals, and 12.90% had someone living alone who was 65 years of age or older. The average household size was 2.44 and the average family size was 2.85.

The township's age distribution consisted of 19.8% under the age of 18, 5.2% from 18 to 24, 26.2% from 25 to 44, 23.3% from 45 to 64, and 25.5% who were 65 years of age or older. The median age was 43.9 years. For every 100 females, there were 103.3 males. For every 100 females age 18 and over, there were 100.0 males.

The median income for a household in the township was $58,958, and the median income for a family was $75,333. Males had a median income of $41,083 versus $31,250 for females. The per capita income for the township was $29,215. About 4.7% of families and 7.1% of the population were below the poverty line, including 11.9% of those under age 18 and 8.2% of those age 65 or over.

Historical population
Census	Pop.	Note	%±
2000	1,283		—
2010	1,255		−2.2%
2020	1,269		1.1%
U.S. Decennial Census

== School districts ==
- Waltonville Community Unit School District 1
- McClellan Community Consolidated School District 12
- Mt. Vernon Township High School
- Rend Lake College

== Political districts ==
- Illinois' 19th congressional district
- State House District 107
- State Senate District 54
