= Woodlawn, Illinois =

- Village
- Location of Woodlawn in Illinois
- Coordinates: 38°19′42″N 89°02′04″W
- Country: United States
- State: Illinois
- County: Jefferson
- Township: Shiloh, Casner
- Established: 1869

Area
  - Total: 0.85 sq mi (2.21 km^{2})
  - Land: 0.85 sq mi (2.21 km^{2})
  - Water: 0 sq mi (0.00 km^{2})
- Elevation: 492 ft (150 m)

Population (2020)
  - Total: 617
  - Density: 724.3/sq mi (279.65/km^{2})
- Time zone: UTC-6 (CST)
  - Summer (DST): UTC-5 (CDT)
- ZIP code: 62898
- Area code: 618
- FIPS code: 17-83206
- GNIS feature ID: 2399734

Woodlawn is a village in Jefferson County, Illinois, United States. The population was 617 at the 2020 census. It is part of the Mount Vernon Micropolitan Statistical Area.

== Geography ==
Woodlawn is part of the Mount Vernon Micropolitan Statistical Area.

According to the 2021 census gazetteer files, Woodlawn has a total area of 0.85 square miles (2.20 km^{2}), all land.

== Demographics ==
Historical population
Census	Pop.	Note	%±
1900	350		—
1910	315		−10.0%
1920	309		−1.9%
1930	273		−11.7%
1940	307		12.5%
1950	320		4.2%
1960	241		−24.7%
1970	308		27.8%
1980	471		52.9%
1990	582		23.6%
2000	630		8.2%
2010	698		10.8%
2020	617		−11.6%
U.S. Decennial Census

As of the 2020 census there were 617 people, 207 households, and 158 families residing in the village. The population density was 724.18 inhabitants per square mile (279.61/km^{2}). There were 270 housing units at an average density of 316.90 per square mile (122.36/km^{2}). The racial makeup of the village was 92.06% White, 1.30% African American, 0.00% Native American, 0.81% Asian, 0.00% Pacific Islander, 0.00% from other races, and 5.83% from two or more races. Hispanic or Latino of any race were 0.65% of the population.

There were 207 households, out of which 44.4% had children under the age of 18 living with them, 56.52% were married couples living together, 16.91% had a female householder with no husband present, and 23.67% were non-families. 22.71% of all households were made up of individuals, and 14.01% had someone living alone who was 65 years of age or older. The average household size was 3.03 and the average family size was 2.66.

The village's age distribution consisted of 31.9% under the age of 18, 6.5% from 18 to 24, 24.1% from 25 to 44, 23.5% from 45 to 64, and 13.9% who were 65 years of age or older. The median age was 35.2 years. For every 100 females, there were 74.5 males. For every 100 females age 18 and over, there were 80.9 males.

The median income for a household in the village was $63,750, and the median income for a family was $70,000. Males had a median income of $42,000 versus $24,375 for females. The per capita income for the village was $23,635. About 11.4% of families and 13.9% of the population were below the poverty line, including 17.9% of those under age 18 and 15.6% of those age 65 or over.

== Education ==
Woodlawn schools consist of Woodlawn C. C. School District 4, with a K-8 elementary school and Woodlawn Community High School District 205 (183 students, 2011–12).

In recent years, the high school boys' basketball team has reached the 1A state tournament 4 times, placing second in 2009, third in 2011, winning the Illinois High School Association Class 1A Championship in 2012, and bringing home a fourth-place trophy in 2016.

The high school baseball team reached the elite eight in 2011 and 2017.

The high school volleyball team brought home a fourth-place trophy in the Illinois High School Association 1A State Tournament in 2014–2015 school year.
