= Spring Garden Township, Jefferson County, Illinois =

Spring Garden Township
- Township
- Location in Jefferson County

- Jefferson County's location in Illinois
- Coordinates: 38°10′N 88°53′W
- Country: United States
- State: Illinois
- County: Jefferson

Area
  - Total: 38.14 sq mi (98.8 km^{2})
  - Land: 36.74 sq mi (95.2 km^{2})
  - Water: 1.41 sq mi (3.7 km^{2}) 3.68%
- Elevation: 486 ft (148 m)

Population (2020)
  - Total: 2,586
  - Density: 70.39/sq mi (27.18/km^{2})
- Time zone: UTC-6 (CST)
  - Summer (DST): UTC-5 (CDT)
- ZIP codes: 62810, 62816, 62836, 62846, 62864
- FIPS code: 17-081-72039

Spring Garden Township is one of sixteen townships in Jefferson County, Illinois, USA. As of the 2020 census, its population was 2,586 and it contained 635 housing units.

== Geography ==
According to the 2021 census gazetteer files, Spring Garden Township has a total area of 38.14 square miles (98.78 km^{2}), of which 36.74 square miles (95.16 km^{2}) (or 96.32%) is land and 1.41 square miles (3.65 km^{2}) (or 3.68%) is water. The township is centered at 38°10'N 88°53'W (38.174,-88.877). It is traversed north–south by Interstate Route 57 and State Route 37.

=== Cities, towns, villages ===
- Bonnie
- Ina

=== Unincorporated towns ===
- Spring Garden at 38.163°N 88.856°W

(This list is based on USGS data and may include former settlements.)

=== Adjacent townships ===
- Dodds Township (north)
- Pendleton Township (northeast)
- Moore's Prairie Township (east)
- Northern Township, Franklin County (southeast)
- Ewing Township, Franklin County (south)
- Barren Township, Franklin County (southwest)
- Elk Prairie Township (west)

=== Cemeteries ===
The township contains these seven cemeteries: Carroll, Fitzgerrell, Hope, Kirk, Knowles, Round Knob and Smith.

=== Major highways ===
- Interstate 57

=== Landmarks ===
- Holiness Camp

== Demographics ==
As of the 2020 census there were 2,586 people, 597 households, and 404 families residing in the township. The population density was 67.80 inhabitants per square mile (26.18/km^{2}). There were 635 housing units at an average density of 16.65 per square mile (6.43/km^{2}). The racial makeup of the township was 75.60% White, 15.51% African American, 0.27% Native American, 0.43% Asian, 0.00% Pacific Islander, 4.68% from other races, and 3.52% from two or more races. Hispanic or Latino of any race were 5.68% of the population.

There were 597 households, out of which 30.80% had children under the age of 18 living with them, 54.27% were married couples living together, 10.89% had a female householder with no spouse present, and 32.33% were non-families. 29.00% of all households were made up of individuals, and 13.10% had someone living alone who was 65 years of age or older. The average household size was 2.53 and the average family size was 3.05.

The township's age distribution consisted of 10.3% under the age of 18, 7.2% from 18 to 24, 39% from 25 to 44, 29.3% from 45 to 64, and 14.2% who were 65 years of age or older. The median age was 40.8 years. For every 100 females, there were 287.3 males. For every 100 females age 18 and over, there were 359.6 males.

The median income for a household in the township was $55,221, and the median income for a family was $61,250. Males had a median income of $38,214 versus $23,333 for females. The per capita income for the township was $11,157. About 7.9% of families and 12.5% of the population were below the poverty line, including 16.5% of those under age 18 and 9.2% of those age 65 or over.

Historical population
| Census | Pop. | Note | %± |
|---|---|---|---|
| 2000 | 3,446 | | — |
| 2010 | 3,307 | | −4.0% |
| 2020 | 2,586 | | −21.8% |
U.S. Decennial Census

== Political districts ==
- Illinois's 19th congressional district
- State House District 107
- State Senate District 54
