= Ewing, Illinois =

- Village
- Location of Ewing in Franklin County, Illinois.
- Coordinates: 38°05′20″N 88°51′10″W
- Country: United States
- State: Illinois
- County: Franklin
- Township: Ewing

Area
  - Total: 1.01 sq mi (2.62 km^{2})
  - Land: 1.01 sq mi (2.61 km^{2})
  - Water: 0 sq mi (0.00 km^{2})
- Elevation: 472 ft (144 m)

Population (2020)
  - Total: 300
  - Density: 297/sq mi (114.8/km^{2})
- Time zone: UTC-6 (CST)
  - Summer (DST): UTC-5 (CDT)
- ZIP code: 62836
- Area code: 618
- FIPS code: 17-24673
- GNIS feature ID: 2398847

Ewing is a village in Franklin County, Illinois, United States. The population was 300 at the 2020 census.

== Geography ==
Ewing is located in northern Franklin County 9 miles (14 km) northeast of Benton, the county seat.

According to the 2021 census gazetteer files, Ewing has a total area of 1.01 square miles (2.62 km^{2}), of which 1.01 square miles (2.62 km^{2}) (or 99.90%) is land and 0.00 square miles (0.00 km^{2}) (or 0.10%) is water.

== Demographics ==
Historical population
Census	Pop.	Note	%±
1880	170		—
1890	290		70.6%
1900	419		44.5%
1910	317		−24.3%
1920	341		7.6%
1930	342		0.3%
1940	339		−0.9%
1950	330		−2.7%
1960	250		−24.2%
1970	220		−12.0%
1980	321		45.9%
1990	264		−17.8%
2000	310		17.4%
2010	307		−1.0%
2020	300		−2.3%
U.S. Decennial Census

As of the 2020 census there were 300 people, 142 households, and 97 families residing in the village. The population density was 297.03 inhabitants per square mile (114.68/km^{2}). There were 127 housing units at an average density of 125.74 per square mile (48.55/km^{2}). The racial makeup of the village was 93.67% White, 1.00% African American, 0.00% Native American, 0.00% Asian, 0.00% Pacific Islander, 0.00% from other races, and 5.33% from two or more races. Hispanic or Latino of any race were 0.67% of the population.

There were 142 households, out of which 27.5% had children under the age of 18 living with them, 52.82% were married couples living together, 7.75% had a female householder with no husband present, and 31.69% were non-families. 28.17% of all households were made up of individuals, and 16.90% had someone living alone who was 65 years of age or older. The average household size was 2.73 and the average family size was 2.25.

The village's age distribution consisted of 20.0% under the age of 18, 7.5% from 18 to 24, 22.8% from 25 to 44, 27% from 45 to 64, and 22.8% who were 65 years of age or older. The median age was 43.5 years. For every 100 females, there were 106.5 males. For every 100 females age 18 and over, there were 104.8 males.

The median income for a household in the village was $61,250, and the median income for a family was $66,563. Males had a median income of $52,500 versus $24,000 for females. The per capita income for the village was $30,748. About 6.2% of families and 7.8% of the population were below the poverty line, including 4.7% of those under age 18 and 12.3% of those age 65 or over.
