= Harmony, Jefferson County, Illinois =

- Unincorporated community
- Location within Illinois Location within the United States
- Coordinates: 38°24′26″N 88°47′34″W
- Country: United States
- State: Illinois
- County: Jefferson
- Elevation: 541 ft (165 m)
- Time zone: UTC-6 (Central (CST))
  - Summer (DST): UTC-5 (CDT)
- Area codes: 815 & 779
- GNIS feature ID: 422782

Harmony is an unincorporated community in Jefferson County, Illinois, United States. Harmony is 8.5 miles (13.7 km) northeast of Mount Vernon.
