= Bakerville, Logan County, Illinois =

Bakerville, Illinois
- Unincorporated community
- Location within Illinois Location within the United States
- Coordinates: 40°03′47″N 89°11′48″W
- Country: United States
- State: Illinois
- County: Logan
- Township: Aetna
- Elevation: 600 ft (180 m)
- Time zone: UTC-6 (Central (CST))
  - Summer (DST): UTC-5 (CDT)
- Area code: 217
- GNIS feature ID: 1816603

Bakerville is an unincorporated community in Logan County, Illinois, United States. Bakerville is northeast of Mount Pulaski.
