= Texico, Illinois =

Texico
- Unincorporated community
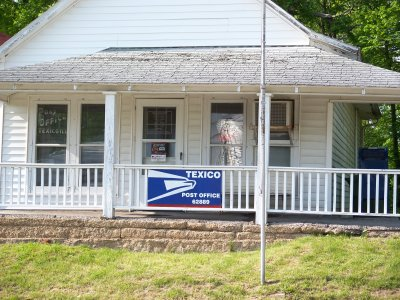
- Post office Texico, Illinois - 62889

- Location of Texico within Illinois Texico (the United States)
- Coordinates: 38°26′22″N 88°53′49″W
- Country: United States
- State: Illinois
- County: Jefferson
- Elevation: 512 ft (156 m)

Population (2010)
  - Total: 809
- Time zone: UTC-6 (CST)
  - Summer (DST): UTC-5 (CDT)
- Postal code: 62889
- Area code: 618
- GNIS ID: 419617

Texico (62889 - also called Field) is an unincorporated community in Jefferson County, Illinois, United States. The population was 851 at the 2010 census.

Texico was named by resident Cashus M. Columbus Theodore Claybourn (1860–1936). The name came from the words Texas, Illinois, Claybourn, and Osborns.

Four churches are located in Texico, the largest and oldest being the Panther Fork Baptist Church. Others include Donoho (a Prairie Christian Church), Antioch Christian Church, and Union Chapel. Texico also has a Post Office, previously had a bank (Texico State Bank) and is home to Field Grade School, a K-8 elementary school.
