= Wayne Fitzgerrell State Recreation Area =

State park bordering Rend Lake

- IUCN category V (protected landscape/seascape)
- Location within Illinois Location within the United States
- Location: Franklin and Jefferson Counties, Illinois, USA
- Nearest city: Benton, Illinois
- Coordinates: 38°06′22″N 88°56′18″W
- Area: 3,300 acres (13.35 km^{2})
- Established: 1975
- Governing body: Illinois Department of Natural Resources

The Wayne Fitzgerrell State Recreation Area is a 3,300-acre (13.4 km²) state park bordering Rend Lake near Benton, Illinois. The state park is managed by the Illinois Department of Natural Resources to concentrate on shoreline recreation, including boating, fishing, and picnicking.

After Rend Lake was completed by the U.S. Army Corps of Engineers in 1970, much of the land acquired by the Army Corps for dam and reservoir construction was available for open-space use. Starting in 1975, the Army Corps leased the Wayne Fitzgerrell parcel of land to the state of Illinois. The state park is named for Wayne Fitzgerrell, a member of the Illinois House of Representatives from nearby Wayne County in the 70th through 74th General Assemblies. Fitzgerrell had been one of the local leaders who had called for the damming of the Big Muddy River and creation of Rend Lake.

Wayne Fitzgerrell was originally dedicated as a state park but changed its name in the 1990s to reflect its identity as a space managed for sportsmen. 1,000 acres (4.0 km²) of the park is consciously managed for the hunting of deer, upland birds such as pheasants, and small game.

The park is a focus of public access to Rend Lake, which is managed for the fishing of largemouth bass, bluegill, channel catfish, and crappie.

Wayne Fitzgerrell is one of the few state parks in Illinois which is bisected by a limited-access highway, Interstate 57. Many visitors to the park use I-57's Exit 77, near the park's headquarters at Whittington, Illinois.
