= Belle Rive, Illinois =

- Village
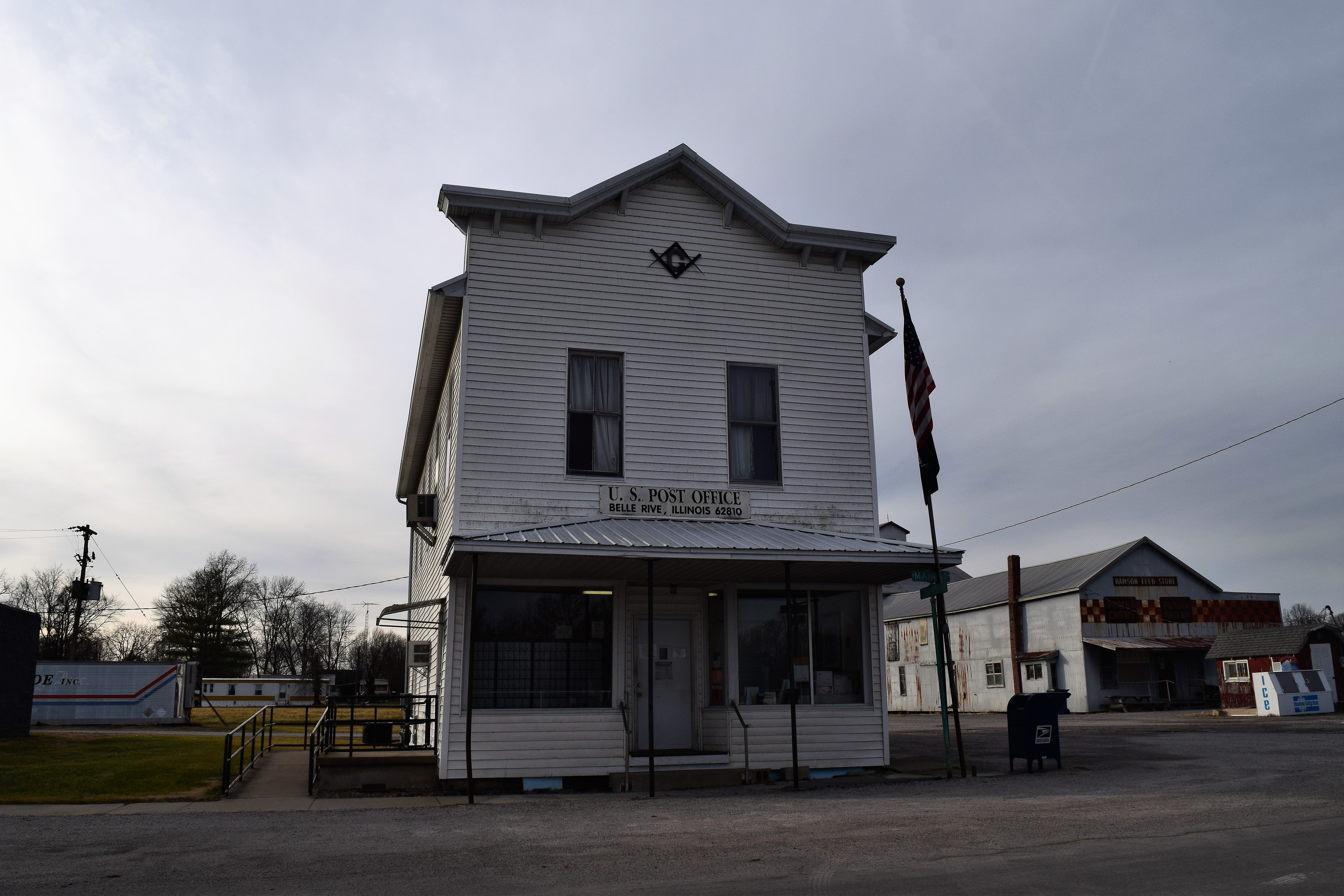
- Belle Rive post office, December 2019

- Location of Belle Rive in Jefferson County, Illinois
- Coordinates: 38°13′54″N 88°44′26″W
- Country: United States
- State: Illinois
- County: Jefferson
- Township: Pendleton

Area
  - Total: 1.03 sq mi (2.66 km^{2})
  - Land: 1.03 sq mi (2.66 km^{2})
  - Water: 0 sq mi (0.00 km^{2})
- Elevation: 476 ft (145 m)

Population (2020)
  - Total: 309
  - Density: 301.1/sq mi (116.27/km^{2})
- Time zone: UTC-6 (CST)
  - Summer (DST): UTC-5 (CDT)
- ZIP code: 62810
- Area code: 618
- FIPS code: 17-04806
- GNIS ID: 2398076

Belle Rive is a village in Jefferson County, Illinois, United States. The population was 309 at the 2020 census. It is part of the Mount Vernon Micropolitan Statistical Area.

== History ==
In 1852, Edmund P. Grant bought about 480 acres (1.9 km^{2}) of federal land grants around what was to become Belle Rive. Grant was a wealthy land speculator from Montgomery County, Tennessee. At that time there was a corporation in Mt. Vernon that was attempting to build a rail line from St. Louis to Evansville, Indiana. It seems likely that Grant was buying land in anticipation of the construction of the railroad, intending to build a town. This early attempt at building a railroad failed during a recession in the mid-1850s. Grant died in 1863, after being chased from Mt. Vernon by a mob objecting to his Confederate politics.

Belle Rive was founded in 1871, coinciding with the opening of the St. Louis & Southeastern Railroad.

Belle Rive got its name from Louis Groston de Saint-Ange de Bellerive, who surrendered Illinois to the British in 1765. It is not clear if he was ever associated with the area near the village. See List of commandants of the Illinois Country.

== Geography ==
Belle Rive is located in southeastern Jefferson County. Illinois Route 142 passes through the village, leading northwest 11 miles (18 km) to Mount Vernon, the county seat, and southeast 15 miles (24 km) to McLeansboro.

According to the 2021 census gazetteer files, Belle Rive has a total area of 1.03 square miles (2.67 km^{2}), all land. The village is drained by tributaries of Auxier Creek, an east-flowing stream in the Little Wabash River watershed.

== Demographics ==
Historical population
Census	Pop.	Note	%±
1900	370		—
1910	312		−15.7%
1920	311		−0.3%
1930	278		−10.6%
1940	333		19.8%
1950	313		−6.0%
1960	303		−3.2%
1970	279		−7.9%
1980	401		43.7%
1990	396		−1.2%
2000	371		−6.3%
2010	361		−2.7%
2020	309		−14.4%
U.S. Decennial Census

As of the 2020 census there were 309 people, 194 households, and 135 families residing in the village. The population density was 301.17 inhabitants per square mile (116.28/km^{2}). There were 155 housing units at an average density of 151.07 per square mile (58.33/km^{2}). The racial makeup of the village was 95.15% White, 0.00% African American, 0.32% Native American, 0.00% Asian, 0.00% Pacific Islander, 0.00% from other races, and 4.53% from two or more races. Hispanic or Latino of any race were 2.27% of the population.

There were 194 households, out of which 35.6% had children under the age of 18 living with them, 37.63% were married couples living together, 11.34% had a female householder with no husband present, and 30.41% were non-families. 23.71% of all households were made up of individuals, and 9.79% had someone living alone who was 65 years of age or older. The average household size was 2.21 and the average family size was 1.95.

The village's age distribution consisted of 15.9% under the age of 18, 11.6% from 18 to 24, 27.2% from 25 to 44, 24.8% from 45 to 64, and 20.4% who were 65 years of age or older. The median age was 38.8 years. For every 100 females, there were 117.2 males. For every 100 females age 18 and over, there were 128.8 males.

The median income for a household in the village was $45,192, and the median income for a family was $42,061. Males had a median income of $41,118 versus $31,985 for females. The per capita income for the village was $27,686. About 8.1% of families and 10.9% of the population were below the poverty line, including 10.2% of those under age 18 and 7.8% of those age 65 or over.

== See also ==
- List of municipalities in Illinois
