= Dareville, Illinois =

- Unincorporated community
- Location within Illinois Location within the United States
- Coordinates: 38°11′54″N 88°58′35″W
- Country: United States
- State: Illinois
- County: Jefferson
- Elevation: 430 ft (130 m)
- Time zone: UTC-6 (Central (CST))
  - Summer (DST): UTC-5 (CDT)
- Area code: 618
- GNIS feature ID: 406951

Dareville is an unincorporated community in Jefferson County, in the U.S. state of Illinois.

The community's name honors the local Dare family of settlers.
