= Scheller, Illinois =

- Unincorporated community
- Location within Illinois Location within the United States
- Coordinates: 38°11′11″N 89°05′42″W
- Country: United States
- State: Illinois
- County: Jefferson
- Elevation: 509 ft (155 m)
- Time zone: UTC-6 (Central (CST))
  - Summer (DST): UTC-5 (CDT)
- ZIP code: 62883
- Area code: 618
- GNIS feature ID: 418076

Scheller is an unincorporated community in Jefferson County, Illinois, United States. Scheller is 3.5 miles (5.6 km) southwest of Waltonville. Scheller has a post office with ZIP code 62883.

== Notable person ==
- Carl Kabat (1933–2022), Roman Catholic priest and activist, was born on a farm in Scheller.
