= Drivers, Illinois =

- Unincorporated community
- Location within Illinois Location within the United States
- Coordinates: 38°19′50″N 88°59′35″W
- Country: United States
- State: Illinois
- County: Jefferson
- Elevation: 440 ft (130 m)
- Time zone: UTC-6 (Central (CST))
  - Summer (DST): UTC-5 (CDT)
- Area code: 618
- GNIS feature ID: 407395

Drivers is an unincorporated community in Jefferson County, in the U.S. state of Illinois.

== History ==
A post office was established at Drivers in 1888, and remained in operation until 1907. James R. Driver, the first postmaster, gave the community his name.
