= Richview Township, Washington County, Illinois =

Richview Township
- Township

- Location of Illinois in the United States
- Coordinates: 38°22′19″N 89°11′54″W
- Country: United States
- State: Illinois
- County: Washington
- Settled: November 6, 1888

Area
  - Total: 11.99 sq mi (31.1 km^{2})
  - Land: 11.97 sq mi (31.0 km^{2})
  - Water: 0.02 sq mi (0.052 km^{2})
- Elevation: 574 ft (175 m)

Population (2010)
  - Estimate (2016): 324
  - Density: 28.6/sq mi (11.0/km^{2})
- Time zone: UTC-6 (CST)
  - Summer (DST): UTC-5 (CDT)
- FIPS code: 17-189-63732

Richview Township is a township located in Washington County, Illinois, United States. As of the 2010 census, its population was 343 and it contained 170 housing units.

== Geography ==
According to the 2010 census, the township has a total area of 11.99 square miles (31.1 km^{2}), of which 11.97 square miles (31.0 km^{2}) (or 99.83%) is land and 0.02 square miles (0.052 km^{2}) (or 0.17%) is water.

=== Major highways ===
- I-64
- US 51
- CR 5

== Demographics ==
Historical population
Census	Pop.	Note	%±
2016 (est.)	324
U.S. Decennial Census
