= Jefferson County, Illinois =

County in Illinois, United States

- County
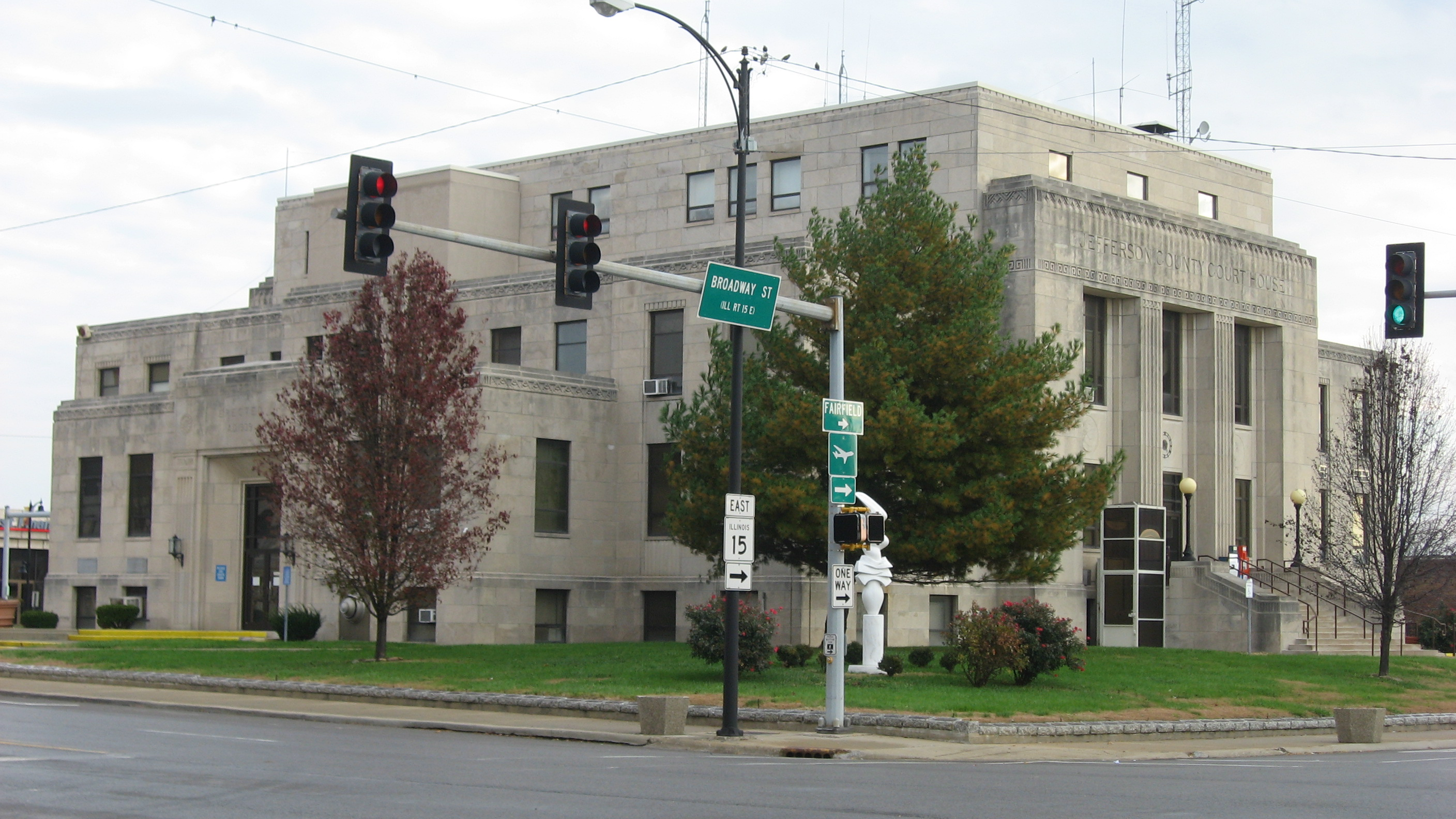
- Jefferson County Courthouse in Mount Vernon

- Location within the U.S. state of Illinois
- Coordinates: 38°18′N 88°55′W
- Country: United States
- State: Illinois
- Founded: 1819
- Named for: Thomas Jefferson
- Seat: Mount Vernon
- Largest city: Mount Vernon

Area
  - Total: 584 sq mi (1,510 km^{2})
  - Land: 571 sq mi (1,480 km^{2})
  - Water: 13 sq mi (34 km^{2}) 2.2%

Population (2020)
  - Total: 37,113
  - Estimate (2025): 36,147 ▼
  - Density: 65.0/sq mi (25.1/km^{2})
- Time zone: UTC−6 (Central)
  - Summer (DST): UTC−5 (CDT)
- Congressional district: 12th
- Website: jeffersoncounty.illinois.gov

Jefferson County is a county located in the southern part of the U.S. state of Illinois. According to the 2020 census, it has a population of 37,113. The county seat is Mount Vernon. Jefferson County also constitutes the Mount Vernon micropolitan area, anchored by the city of Mount Vernon. It is located in the southern portion known locally as "Little Egypt". The western border of the county adjoins the Greater St. Louis consolidated metropolitan statistical area, the Metro-East region, and the St. Louis commuter region and market and television viewing area.

== History ==
The first settler in Jefferson County is believed to have been Andrew Moore. In 1810, he settled near the southeast corner of the county, near where the Goshen Road emerges from the forest of Hamilton County into what is now known as Moore's Prairie. Moore arrived from the Goshen Settlement, near Edwardsville. His migration was therefore retrograde, from the west toward the interior of the State.

In 1814, Andrew Moore departed with his eight-year-old son for Jordan's settlement, a journey from which he never returned. A skull that was believed to have been Moore's was found several years later about two miles from his cabin. Jordan's Settlement, also called Jordan's Fort, was southeast of modern Thompsonville, Illinois, about twenty miles south of Moore's cabin. This episode occurred during the War of 1812 when many of the Indian tribes were allied with the British.

In 1816, Carter Wilkey, Daniel Crenshaw and Robert Cook settled in Moore's Prairie. Daniel Crenshaw moved into Moore's cabin. This settlement is believed to be the first permanent settlement in the county.

Jefferson County was organized in 1819, out of parts of White, Edwards and Franklin Counties. It was named in honor of Thomas Jefferson, principal draftsman of the Northwest Ordinance, among other things. The baseline along the northern border of the County crosses the Third Principal Meridian at the northwest corner of the county.

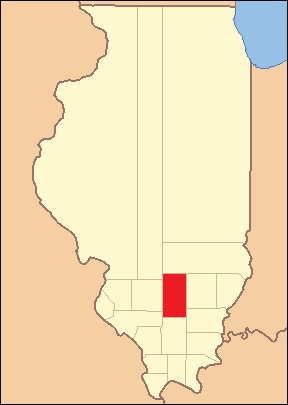
Jefferson County between the time of its creation and 1821

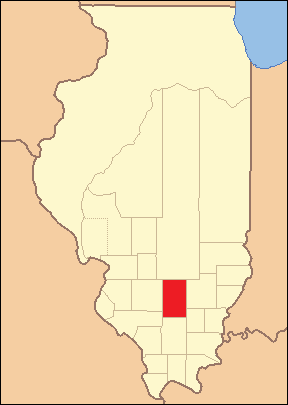
Jefferson County between 1821 and 1823

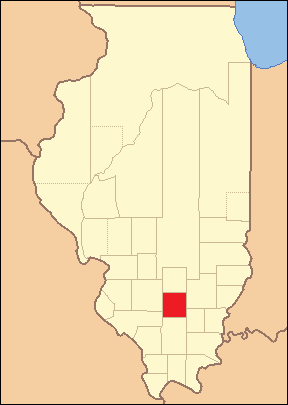
Jefferson County in 1823, reduced to its current size

== Geography ==
According to the U.S. Census Bureau, the county has a total area of 584 square miles (1,510 km^{2}), of which 571 square miles (1,480 km^{2}) is land and 13 square miles (34 km^{2}) (2.2%) is water.

=== Climate and weather ===
Mount Vernon, Illinois

Climate chart (precipitation, max. and min. temperature)
J	F	M	A	M	J	J	A	S	O	N	D
2.5 37 19	2.7 43 23	4 54 33	4.4 65 43	4.6 75 53	3.6 84 62	3.6 88 66	3.3 86 64	3.1 79 56	2.9 68 43	4.4 54 34	3.2 42 24
- █ Average max. and min. temperatures in °F
- █ Precipitation totals in inches
- Source: The Weather Channel
Metric conversion
J	F	M	A	M	J	J	A	S	O	N	D
62 3 −7	68 6 −5	101 12 1	113 18 6	116 24 12	92 29 17	91 31 19	83 30 18	79 26 13	74 20 6	111 12 1	81 6 −4
- █ Average max. and min. temperatures in °C
- █ Precipitation totals in mm

In recent years, average temperatures in the county seat of Mount Vernon have ranged from a low of 19 °F (−7 °C) in January to a high of 88 °F (31 °C) in July, although a record low of −21 °F (−29 °C) was recorded in January 1994 and a record high of 114 °F (46 °C) was recorded in July 1936. Average monthly precipitation ranged from 2.45 inches (62 mm) in January to 4.58 inches (116 mm) in May.

=== Major highways ===
- Interstate 57
- Interstate 64
- U.S. Highway 51
- Illinois Route 15
- Illinois Route 37
- Illinois Route 142
- Illinois Route 148

=== Transit ===
- South Central Transit
- List of intercity bus stops in Illinois

=== Adjacent counties ===
- Marion County – north
- Wayne County – northeast
- Hamilton County – southeast
- Franklin County – south
- Perry County – southwest
- Washington County – west

== Demographics ==
Historical population
Census	Pop.	Note	%±
1820	691		—
1830	2,555		269.8%
1840	5,762		125.5%
1850	8,109		40.7%
1860	12,965		59.9%
1870	17,864		37.8%
1880	20,686		15.8%
1890	22,590		9.2%
1900	28,133		24.5%
1910	29,111		3.5%
1920	28,480		−2.2%
1930	31,034		9.0%
1940	34,375		10.8%
1950	35,892		4.4%
1960	32,315		−10.0%
1970	31,446		−2.7%
1980	36,552		16.2%
1990	37,020		1.3%
2000	40,045		8.2%
2010	38,827		−3.0%
2020	37,113		−4.4%
2025 (est.)	36,147	▼	−2.6%
U.S. Decennial Census; 1790–1960 1900–1990; 1990–2000 2010–2013

2000 census age pyramid for Jefferson County

=== 2020 census ===
As of the 2020 census, the county had a population of 37,113, a median age of 42.2 years, 22.3% of residents under the age of 18, 20.2% of residents 65 years of age or older, 103.2 males for every 100 females, and 103.6 males for every 100 females age 18 and over.

The racial makeup of the county was 84.7% White, 7.7% Black or African American, 0.2% American Indian and Alaska Native, 1.0% Asian, <0.1% Native Hawaiian and Pacific Islander, 0.9% from some other race, and 5.5% from two or more races. Hispanic or Latino residents of any race comprised 2.4% of the population.

41.2% of residents lived in urban areas, while 58.8% lived in rural areas.

There were 14,945 households in the county, of which 28.5% had children under the age of 18 living in them. Of all households, 46.7% were married-couple households, 19.6% were households with a male householder and no spouse or partner present, and 26.8% were households with a female householder and no spouse or partner present. About 30.7% of all households were made up of individuals and 14.0% had someone living alone who was 65 years of age or older.

There were 16,632 housing units, of which 10.1% were vacant. Among occupied housing units, 73.1% were owner-occupied and 26.9% were renter-occupied. The homeowner vacancy rate was 2.4% and the rental vacancy rate was 10.3%.

=== Racial and ethnic composition ===
Jefferson County, Illinois – Racial and ethnic composition Note: the US Census treats Hispanic/Latino as an ethnic category. This table excludes Latinos from the racial categories and assigns them to a separate category. Hispanics/Latinos may be of any race.
Race / Ethnicity (NH = Non-Hispanic)	Pop 1980	Pop 1990	Pop 2000	Pop 2010	Pop 2020	% 1980	% 1990	% 2000	% 2010	% 2020
White alone (NH)	34,676	34,756	35,709	33,919	31,182	94.87%	93.88%	89.17%	87.36%	84.02%
Black or African American alone (NH)	1,588	1,917	3,093	3,194	2,783	4.34%	5.18%	7.72%	8.23%	7.50%
Native American or Alaska Native alone (NH)	31	52	77	69	77	0.08%	0.14%	0.19%	0.18%	0.21%
Asian alone (NH)	66	126	188	246	352	0.18%	0.34%	0.47%	0.63%	0.95%
Native Hawaiian or Pacific Islander alone (NH)	x	x	2	7	7	x	x	0.00%	0.02%	0.02%
Other race alone (NH)	11	12	28	44	68	0.03%	0.03%	0.07%	0.11%	0.18%
Mixed race or Multiracial (NH)	x	x	417	549	1,745	x	x	1.04%	1.41%	4.70%
Hispanic or Latino (any race)	180	157	531	799	899	0.49%	0.42%	1.33%	2.06%	2.42%
Total	36,552	37,020	40,045	38,827	37,113	100.00%	100.00%	100.00%	100.00%	100.00%

=== 2010 census ===
As of the 2010 United States census, there were 38,827 people, 15,365 households, and 10,140 families residing in the county. The population density was 68.0 inhabitants per square mile (26.3/km^{2}). There were 16,954 housing units at an average density of 29.7 per square mile (11.5/km^{2}). The racial makeup of the county was 88.4% white, 8.4% black or African American, 0.6% Asian, 0.2% American Indian, 0.8% from other races, and 1.6% from two or more races. Those of Hispanic or Latino origin made up 2.1% of the population. In terms of ancestry, 24.3% were German, 15.8% were Irish, 13.6% were English, and 10.2% were American.

Of the 15,365 households, 30.1% had children under the age of 18 living with them, 50.0% were married couples living together, 11.4% had a female householder with no husband present, 34.0% were non-families, and 29.1% of all households were made up of individuals. The average household size was 2.38 and the average family size was 2.92. The median age was 40.6 years.

The median income for a household in the county was $41,161 and the median income for a family was $51,262. Males had a median income of $41,193 versus $29,645 for females. The per capita income for the county was $21,370. About 12.4% of families and 17.1% of the population were below the poverty line, including 24.8% of those under age 18 and 10.7% of those age 65 or over.

== Agencies ==
In 2015 the county police department announced that the words "In God We Trust" will be on police squad cars.

Jeff Bullard is the current Sheriff of Jefferson County.

== Politics ==
Jefferson is politically a fairly typical “anti-Yankee” Southern Illinois county. Opposition to the “Yankee” Republican Party and that party's Civil War meant that Jefferson County voted solidly Democratic until Theodore Roosevelt carried the county in his 1904 landslide. It was to again vote Republican in the greater landslides of 1920 and 1928, but otherwise was firmly Democratic until World War II.

Following the New Deal, Jefferson became something of a bellwether county, voting for every winning presidential candidate between 1928 and 2004 except in the Catholicism-influenced 1960 election, and that of 1988 which was heavily influenced by a major Midwestern drought. Disagreement with the Democratic Party's liberal views on social issues since the 1990s has caused a powerful swing to the GOP in the past quarter-century: as is typical of the Upland South, Barack Obama in 2012 and Hillary Clinton did far worse than any previous Democrat.

United States presidential election results for Jefferson County, Illinois
Year	Republican		Democratic		Third party(ies)	
Year	No.	%	No.	%	No.	%
1892	1,949	37.24%	2,332	44.55%	953	18.21%
1896	2,603	41.27%	3,588	56.89%	116	1.84%
1900	2,805	44.22%	3,332	52.53%	206	3.25%
1904	3,063	51.33%	2,462	41.26%	442	7.41%
1908	3,210	47.30%	3,377	49.76%	200	2.95%
1912	1,834	27.73%	3,237	48.94%	1,543	23.33%
1916	6,028	46.35%	6,685	51.40%	292	2.25%
1920	5,711	53.57%	4,772	44.77%	177	1.66%
1924	5,406	44.57%	6,258	51.59%	466	3.84%
1928	7,326	55.08%	5,905	44.40%	70	0.53%
1932	5,333	35.54%	9,495	63.28%	177	1.18%
1936	7,290	41.26%	10,240	57.96%	138	0.78%
1940	8,692	44.09%	10,887	55.22%	136	0.69%
1944	7,916	47.83%	8,496	51.33%	139	0.84%
1948	7,393	45.30%	8,928	54.70%	0	0.00%
1952	9,841	53.03%	8,698	46.87%	19	0.10%
1956	9,637	54.36%	8,090	45.64%	0	0.00%
1960	9,841	55.84%	7,784	44.16%	0	0.00%
1964	6,248	39.29%	9,653	60.71%	0	0.00%
1968	7,367	47.63%	6,476	41.87%	1,624	10.50%
1972	9,448	59.40%	6,396	40.21%	61	0.38%
1976	7,422	44.93%	8,989	54.41%	109	0.66%
1980	8,972	54.91%	6,761	41.38%	607	3.71%
1984	9,642	57.10%	7,200	42.64%	43	0.25%
1988	7,624	49.42%	7,729	50.10%	73	0.47%
1992	5,497	31.24%	8,665	49.24%	3,435	19.52%
1996	5,937	39.63%	7,263	48.48%	1,781	11.89%
2000	8,362	54.44%	6,685	43.52%	313	2.04%
2004	10,160	59.95%	6,713	39.61%	75	0.44%
2008	9,302	54.02%	7,462	43.33%	457	2.65%
2012	9,811	60.12%	6,089	37.31%	420	2.57%
2016	11,695	68.80%	4,425	26.03%	879	5.17%
2020	12,476	71.55%	4,608	26.43%	352	2.02%
2024	12,189	72.97%	4,240	25.38%	275	1.65%

== Communities ==
=== Cities ===
- Mount Vernon
- Nason

=== Villages ===
- Belle Rive
- Bluford
- Bonnie
- Dix
- Ina
- Waltonville
- Woodlawn

=== Census-designated place ===
- Opdyke

=== Other unincorporated communities ===
- Bakerville
- Boyd
- Camp Ground
- Dareville
- Divide
- Drivers
- Harmony
- Roaches
- Scheller
- Texico

=== Townships ===
Jefferson County is divided into sixteen townships:

- Bald Hill
- Blissville
- Casner
- Dodds
- Elk Prairie
- Farrington
- Field
- Grand Prairie
- McClellan
- Moore's Prairie
- Mt. Vernon
- Pendleton
- Rome
- Shiloh
- Spring Garden
- Webber

== Education ==
School districts include:

K-12:

- Bluford Unit School District 318
- Hamilton County Community Unit School District 10
- Sesser-Valier Community Unit School District 196
- Waltonville Community Unit School District 1
- Wayne City Community Unit School District 100
- Woodlawn Unit District 209

Secondary:

- Benton Consolidated High School District 103
- Centralia High School District 200
- Mount Vernon Township High School District 201
- Nashville Community High School District 99 – Primary school can go to Woodlawn School
- Salem Community High School District 600

Elementary:

- Ashley Community Consolidated School District 15 – Can attend secondary school in Woodlawn
- Bethel School District 82
- Centralia School District 135
- Ewing Northern Community Consolidated District 115
- Farrington Community Consolidated School District 99 – Can attend secondary school at Bluford
- Field Community Consolidated School District 3
- Grand Prairie Community Consolidated School District 6 – Can attend secondary school in Woodlawn
- Kell Consolidated School District 2
- McClellan Community Consolidated School District 12
- Mount Vernon School District 80 – Can attend elementary school at Bluford and Woodlawn
- Opdyke-Belle Rive Community Consolidated School District 5 – Can attend secondary school at Bluford
- Spring Garden School District 178
- Rome Community Consolidated School District 2 – Can attend secondary school in Woodlawn
- Summersville School District 79

== See also ==
- National Register of Historic Places listings in Jefferson County, Illinois
