= Goode Township, Franklin County, Illinois =

Goode Township
- Township
- Location in Franklin County

- Franklin County's location in Illinois
- Coordinates: 38°04′50″N 89°05′05″W
- Country: United States
- State: Illinois
- County: Franklin
- Established: November 4, 1884

Area
  - Total: 28.23 sq mi (73.1 km^{2})
  - Land: 27.94 sq mi (72.4 km^{2})
  - Water: 0.29 sq mi (0.75 km^{2}) 1.02%
- Elevation: 433 ft (132 m)

Population (2020)
  - Total: 2,652
  - Density: 94.92/sq mi (36.65/km^{2})
- Time zone: UTC-6 (CST)
  - Summer (DST): UTC-5 (CDT)
- ZIP codes: 62865, 62883, 62884
- FIPS code: 17-055-30406

Goode Township is one of twelve townships in Franklin County, Illinois, USA. As of the 2020 census, its population was 2,652 and it contained 1,284 housing units.

== Geography ==
According to the 2021 census gazetteer files, Goode Township has a total area of 28.23 square miles (73.12 km^{2}), of which 27.94 square miles (72.36 km^{2}) (or 98.98%) is land and 0.29 square miles (0.75 km^{2}) (or 1.02%) is water.

=== Cities, towns, villages ===
- Sesser (vast majority)

=== Unincorporated towns ===
- Meyer

(This list is based on USGS data and may include former settlements.)

=== Cemeteries ===
The township contains these four cemeteries: Bear Point, Maple Hill, Mitchell and Youngblood.

=== Major highways ===
- Illinois Route 148
- Illinois Route 154

== Demographics ==
As of the 2020 census there were 2,652 people, 1,040 households, and 756 families residing in the township. The population density was 93.94 inhabitants per square mile (36.27/km^{2}). There were 1,284 housing units at an average density of 45.48 per square mile (17.56/km^{2}). The racial makeup of the township was 93.93% White, 0.45% African American, 0.08% Native American, 0.04% Asian, 0.00% Pacific Islander, 0.60% from other races, and 4.90% from two or more races. Hispanic or Latino of any race were 2.38% of the population.

There were 1,040 households, out of which 30.40% had children under the age of 18 living with them, 56.73% were married couples living together, 9.42% had a female householder with no spouse present, and 27.31% were non-families. 23.00% of all households were made up of individuals, and 11.60% had someone living alone who was 65 years of age or older. The average household size was 2.54 and the average family size was 3.00.

The township's age distribution consisted of 21.9% under the age of 18, 7.1% from 18 to 24, 24.9% from 25 to 44, 28.6% from 45 to 64, and 17.5% who were 65 years of age or older. The median age was 41.9 years. For every 100 females, there were 108.3 males. For every 100 females age 18 and over, there were 105.1 males.

The median income for a household in the township was $59,583, and the median income for a family was $74,300. Males had a median income of $41,563 versus $27,067 for females. The per capita income for the township was $27,673. About 4.2% of families and 4.6% of the population were below the poverty line, including 5.2% of those under age 18 and 6.3% of those age 65 or over.

Historical population
Census	Pop.	Note	%±
2000	2,951		—
2010	2,715		−8.0%
2020	2,652		−2.3%
U.S. Decennial Census

== School districts ==
- Sesser-Valier Community Unit School District 196

== Political districts ==
- Illinois' 12th congressional district
- State House District 117
- State Senate District 59
