= Du Bois Township, Washington County, Illinois =

DuBois Township
- Township

- Location of Illinois in the United States
- Coordinates: 38°15′41″N 89°11′44″W
- Country: United States
- State: Illinois
- County: Washington
- Settled: November 6, 1888

Area
  - Total: 36.8 sq mi (95 km^{2})
  - Land: 36.76 sq mi (95.2 km^{2})
  - Water: 0.04 sq mi (0.10 km^{2})
- Elevation: 522 ft (159 m)

Population (2010)
  - Estimate (2016): 719
  - Density: 20.3/sq mi (7.8/km^{2})
- Time zone: UTC-6 (CST)
  - Summer (DST): UTC-5 (CDT)
- FIPS code: 17-189-20877

DuBois Township is located in Washington County, Illinois. As of the 2010 census, its population was 748 and it contained 366 housing units.

== History ==
DuBois Township is named for Jesse K. Du Bois, state auditor of public accounts, 1856–1864.

== Geography ==
According to the 2010 census, the township has a total area of 36.8 square miles (95 km^{2}), of which 36.76 square miles (95.2 km^{2}) (or 99.89%) is land and 0.04 square miles (0.10 km^{2}) (or 0.11%) is water.

== Demographics ==
Historical population
Census	Pop.	Note	%±
2016 (est.)	719
U.S. Decennial Census
