= Ewing Township, Franklin County, Illinois =

Ewing Township
- Township
- Location in Franklin County

- Franklin County's location in Illinois
- Coordinates: 38°04′45″N 88°52′42″W
- Country: United States
- State: Illinois
- County: Franklin
- Established: November 4, 1884

Area
  - Total: 38.02 sq mi (98.5 km^{2})
  - Land: 35.90 sq mi (93.0 km^{2})
  - Water: 2.12 sq mi (5.5 km^{2}) 5.58%
- Elevation: 472 ft (144 m)

Population (2020)
  - Total: 1,361
  - Density: 37.91/sq mi (14.64/km^{2})
- Time zone: UTC-6 (CST)
  - Summer (DST): UTC-5 (CDT)
- ZIP codes: 62812, 62836, 62846, 62897
- FIPS code: 17-055-24686

Ewing Township is one of twelve townships in Franklin County, Illinois, USA. As of the 2020 census, its population consisted of 1,361 in 608 households.

== Geography ==
According to the 2021 census gazetteer files, Ewing Township has a total area of 38.02 square miles (98.47 km^{2}), of which 35.90 square miles (92.98 km^{2}) (or 94.42%) is land and 2.12 square miles (5.49 km^{2}) (or 5.58%) is water. The east portion of the Wayne Fitzgerrell State Recreation Area is in this township, as is Rend Lake.

=== Cities, towns, villages ===
- Benton (north quarter)
- Ewing

=== School districts ===
Ewing-Northern Grade School 115

=== Unincorporated towns ===
- Benton Park
- Whittington

(This list is based on USGS data and may include former settlements.)

=== Cemeteries ===
The township contains these nine cemeteries: Cypher, Franklin, King, Miller, Overturf, Phillips, Shiloh, Thurmond and Winemiller.

=== Major highways ===
- Interstate 57
- Illinois Route 14
- Illinois Route 154

=== Airports and landing strips ===
- Rend Lake Conservancy District Heliport

== Demographics ==
As of the 2020 census there were 1,361 people, 608 households, and 413 families residing in the township. The population density was 35.80 inhabitants per square mile (13.82/km^{2}). There were 627 housing units at an average density of 16.49 per square mile (6.37/km^{2}). The racial makeup of the township was 96.25% White, 0.44% African American, 0.15% Native American, 0.37% Asian, 0.00% Pacific Islander, 0.07% from other races, and 2.72% from two or more races. Hispanic or Latino of any race were 0.37% of the population.

There were 608 households, out of which 31.10% had children under the age of 18 living with them, 50.33% were married couples living together, 8.22% had a female householder with no spouse present, and 32.07% were non-families. 27.60% of all households were made up of individuals, and 9.50% had someone living alone who was 65 years of age or older. The average household size was 2.58 and the average family size was 3.02.

The township's age distribution consisted of 23.4% under the age of 18, 9.3% from 18 to 24, 22% from 25 to 44, 31.2% from 45 to 64, and 14.1% who were 65 years of age or older. The median age was 42.2 years. For every 100 females, there were 121.8 males. For every 100 females age 18 and over, there were 124.1 males.

The median income for a household in the township was $60,833, and the median income for a family was $73,750. Males had a median income of $48,929 versus $29,457 for females. The per capita income for the township was $29,940. About 9.4% of families and 13.1% of the population were below the poverty line, including 8.3% of those under age 18 and 6.8% of those age 65 or over.

Historical population
Census	Pop.	Note	%±
2000	1,431		—
2010	1,345		−6.0%
2020	1,361		1.2%
U.S. Decennial Census

== Political districts ==
- Illinois' 12th congressional district
- State House District 117
- State Senate District 59
