= Irvington Township, Washington County, Illinois =

Irvington Township
- Township
- Location of Illinois in the United States
- Country: United States
- State: Illinois
- County: Washington
- Settled: November 6, 1888

Area
  - Total: 48.56 sq mi (125.8 km^{2})
  - Land: 48.44 sq mi (125.5 km^{2})
  - Water: 0.11 sq mi (0.28 km^{2})
- Elevation: 482 ft (147 m)

Population (2010)
  - Estimate (2016): 1,228
  - Density: 26.5/sq mi (10.2/km^{2})
- Time zone: UTC-6 (CST)
  - Summer (DST): UTC-5 (CDT)
- FIPS code: 17-189-37790

Irvington Township is in Washington County, Illinois. As of the 2010 census, its population was 1,285 and it contained 593 housing units. Irvington Township was named for Washington Irving.

== Geography ==
According to the 2010 census, the township has a total area of 48.56 square miles (125.8 km^{2}), of which 48.44 square miles (125.5 km^{2}) (or 99.75%) is land and 0.11 square miles (0.28 km^{2}) (or 0.23%) is water.

=== Major highways ===
- I-64
- US 51
- IL 177
- CR 18

== Demographics ==
Historical population
Census	Pop.	Note	%±
2016 (est.)	1,228
U.S. Decennial Census
