= South Muddy Township, Jasper County, Illinois =

South Muddy Township
- Township
- Location in Jasper County

- Jasper County's location in Illinois
- Coordinates: 38°54′04″N 88°18′50″W
- Country: United States
- State: Illinois
- County: Jasper
- Established: November 8, 1859

Area
  - Total: 38.64 sq mi (100.1 km^{2})
  - Land: 35.71 sq mi (92.5 km^{2})
  - Water: 2.93 sq mi (7.6 km^{2}) 7.58%
- Elevation: 522 ft (159 m)

Population (2020)
  - Total: 341
  - Density: 9.55/sq mi (3.69/km^{2})
- Time zone: UTC-6 (CST)
  - Summer (DST): UTC-5 (CDT)
- ZIP codes: 62424, 62434, 62448, 62479
- FIPS code: 17-079-71084

South Muddy Township is one of eleven townships in Jasper County, Illinois, USA. As of the 2020 census, its population was 341 and it contained 135 housing units.

== Geography ==
According to the 2021 census gazetteer files, South Muddy Township has a total area of 38.64 square miles (100.08 km^{2}), of which 35.71 square miles (92.49 km^{2}) (or 92.42%) is land and 2.93 square miles (7.59 km^{2}) (or 7.58%) is water.

=== Adjacent townships ===
- North Muddy Township (north)
- Wade Township (northeast)
- Smallwood Township (east)
- Denver Township, Richland County (southeast)
- Pixley Township, Clay County (south)
- Bible Grove Township, Clay County (west)
- Lucas Township, Effingham County (northwest)

=== Cemeteries ===
The township contains these ten cemeteries: Abbott, Devore, Foster, Freeman, Fulks, Headyville, Pleasant Valley, South Muddy, Worthey and Worthy.

== Demographics ==
As of the 2020 census there were 341 people, 168 households, and 148 families residing in the township. The population density was 8.83 inhabitants per square mile (3.41/km^{2}). There were 135 housing units at an average density of 3.49 per square mile (1.35/km^{2}). The racial makeup of the township was 94.43% White, 0.00% African American, 0.29% Native American, 0.00% Asian, 0.00% Pacific Islander, 0.00% from other races, and 5.28% from two or more races. Hispanic or Latino of any race were 0.59% of the population.

There were 168 households, out of which 28.00% had children under the age of 18 living with them, 76.79% were married couples living together, 5.36% had a female householder with no spouse present, and 11.90% were non-families. No households were made up of individuals. The average household size was 3.09 and the average family size was 3.17.

The township's age distribution consisted of 26.4% under the age of 18, 9.8% from 18 to 24, 25% from 25 to 44, 22.1% from 45 to 64, and 16.6% who were 65 years of age or older. The median age was 40.1 years. For every 100 females, there were 110.1 males. For every 100 females age 18 and over, there were 94.9 males.

The median income for a household in the township was $85,313, and the median income for a family was $80,000. Males had a median income of $51,806 versus $27,083 for females. The per capita income for the township was $30,768. None of the population was below the poverty line.

Historical population
Census	Pop.	Note	%±
2000	331		—
2010	340		2.7%
2020	341		0.3%
U.S. Decennial Census

== School districts ==
- Dieterich Community Unit School District 30
- Jasper County Community Unit School District 1

== Political districts ==
- Illinois' 19th congressional district
- State House District 108
- State Senate District 54
