= Omega Township, Marion County, Illinois =

Omega Township
- Township

- Location of Illinois in the United States
- Coordinates: 38°42′N 88°45′W
- Country: United States
- State: Illinois
- County: Marion
- Settled: November 4, 1873

Area
  - Total: 36.33 sq mi (94.1 km^{2})
  - Land: 35.49 sq mi (91.9 km^{2})
  - Water: 0.84 sq mi (2.2 km^{2})
- Elevation: 574 ft (175 m)

Population (2010)
  - Estimate (2016): 486
  - Density: 14.1/sq mi (5.4/km^{2})
- Time zone: UTC-6 (CST)
  - Summer (DST): UTC-5 (CDT)
- FIPS code: 17-121-56055

Omega Township is located in Marion County, Illinois. As of the 2010 census, its population was 501 and it contained 212 housing units.

== Geography ==
Omega Township (T3N R4E) is centered at 38°42'N 88°45'W (38.699, -88.756). Forbes Lake (El. 156 m) and Stephen A. Forbes State Park are located mainly at the north end of the township. According to the 2010 census, the township has a total area of 36.33 square miles (94.1 km^{2}), of which 35.49 square miles (91.9 km^{2}) (or 97.69%) is land and 0.84 square miles (2.2 km^{2}) (or 2.31%) is water.

== Demographics ==
Historical population
Census	Pop.	Note	%±
2016 (est.)	486
U.S. Decennial Census

== Adjacent townships ==
- Meacham Township (north)
- Oskaloosa Township, Clay County (northeast)
- Songer Township, Clay County (east)
- Xenia Township, Clay County (southeast)
- Iuka Township (south)
- Stevenson Township (southwest)
- Alma Township (west)
- Kinmundy Township (northwest)
