= Meacham Township, Marion County, Illinois =

Meacham Township
- Township

- Location of Illinois in the United States
- Coordinates: 38°46′N 88°45′W
- Country: United States
- State: Illinois
- County: Marion
- Settled: November 4, 1873

Area
  - Total: 36.66 sq mi (94.9 km^{2})
  - Land: 36.54 sq mi (94.6 km^{2})
  - Water: 0.12 sq mi (0.31 km^{2})
- Elevation: 584 ft (178 m)

Population (2010)
  - Estimate (2016): 367
  - Density: 10.3/sq mi (4.0/km^{2})
- Time zone: UTC-6 (CST)
  - Summer (DST): UTC-5 (CDT)
- FIPS code: 17-121-47826

Meacham Township is located in Marion County, Illinois. As of the 2010 census, its population was 375 and it contained 167 housing units.

== Geography ==
Meacham Township (T4N R4E) is centered at 38°46'N 88°45'W (38.774, -88.754). Short portions of Interstate Route 57, State Route 37 and the East Fork of the Kaskaskia River cross the township's northwest corner. The north ends of Forbes Lake and Stephen A. Forbes State Park are located at its southern border. According to the 2010 census, the township has a total area of 36.66 square miles (94.9 km^{2}), of which 36.54 square miles (94.6 km^{2}) (or 99.67%) is land and 0.12 square miles (0.31 km^{2}) (or 0.33%) is water.

== Demographics ==
Historical population
Census	Pop.	Note	%±
2016 (est.)	367
U.S. Decennial Census

== Adjacent townships ==
- LaClede Township, Fayette County (north)
- Larkinsburg Township, Clay County (northeast)
- Oskaloosa Township, Clay County (east)
- Songer Township, Clay County (southeast)
- Omega Township (south)
- Alma Township (southwest)
- Kinmundy Township (west)
- Lone Grove Township, Fayette County (northwest)
