= North Muddy Township, Jasper County, Illinois =

North Muddy Township
- Township
- Location in Jasper County

- Jasper County's location in Illinois
- Coordinates: 39°01′10″N 88°18′43″W
- Country: United States
- State: Illinois
- County: Jasper
- Established: November 8, 1859

Area
  - Total: 51.05 sq mi (132.2 km^{2})
  - Land: 51.05 sq mi (132.2 km^{2})
  - Water: 0 sq mi (0 km^{2}) 0.01%
- Elevation: 571 ft (174 m)

Population (2020)
  - Total: 746
  - Density: 14.6/sq mi (5.64/km^{2})
- Time zone: UTC-6 (CST)
  - Summer (DST): UTC-5 (CDT)
- ZIP codes: 62448, 62479
- FIPS code: 17-079-54001

North Muddy Township is one of eleven townships in Jasper County, Illinois, USA. As of the 2020 census, its population was 746 and it contained 322 housing units.

== Geography ==
According to the 2021 census gazetteer files, North Muddy Township has a total area of 51.05 square miles (132.22 km^{2}), of which 51.05 square miles (132.22 km^{2}) (or 99.99%) is land and 0.00 square miles (0.00 km^{2}) (or 0.01%) is water.

=== Cities, towns, villages ===
- Wheeler

=== Unincorporated towns ===
- Latona at 38.9806°N 88.31171°W

(This list is based on USGS data and may include former settlements.)

=== Adjacent townships ===
- Grove Township (north)
- Wade Township (east)
- Smallwood Township (southeast)
- South Muddy Township (south)
- Lucas Township, Effingham County (southwest)
- Bishop Township, Effingham County (west)
- St. Francis Township, Effingham County (northwest)

=== Cemeteries ===
The township contains these five cemeteries: Bailey, Slate Point, Trexler/Kedron/Toland Grove, Wheeler Family and Wheeler.

=== Major highways ===
- Illinois Route 33

== Demographics ==
As of the 2020 census there were 746 people, 198 households, and 159 families residing in the township. The population density was 14.61 inhabitants per square mile (5.64/km^{2}). There were 322 housing units at an average density of 6.31 per square mile (2.44/km^{2}). The racial makeup of the township was 97.99% White, 0.27% African American, 0.00% Native American, 0.13% Asian, 0.13% Pacific Islander, 0.40% from other races, and 1.07% from two or more races. Hispanic or Latino of any race were 0.67% of the population.

There were 198 households, out of which 40.40% had children under the age of 18 living with them, 74.75% were married couples living together, 5.56% had a female householder with no spouse present, and 19.70% were non-families. 14.10% of all households were made up of individuals, and 4.00% had someone living alone who was 65 years of age or older. The average household size was 2.97 and the average family size was 3.36.

The township's age distribution consisted of 32.3% under the age of 18, 1.4% from 18 to 24, 33.7% from 25 to 44, 19.8% from 45 to 64, and 12.9% who were 65 years of age or older. The median age was 35.4 years. For every 100 females, there were 123.6 males. For every 100 females age 18 and over, there were 122.3 males.

The median income for a household in the township was $66,563, and the median income for a family was $68,906. Males had a median income of $44,345 versus $31,528 for females. The per capita income for the township was $25,502. About 6.9% of families and 7.8% of the population were below the poverty line, including 14.2% of those under age 18 and 3.9% of those age 65 or over.

Historical population
| Census | Pop. | Note | %± |
|---|---|---|---|
| 2000 | 741 | | — |
| 2010 | 777 | | 4.9% |
| 2020 | 746 | | −4.0% |
U.S. Decennial Census

== School districts ==
- Dieterich Community Unit School District 30
- Jasper County Community Unit School District 1

== Political districts ==
- Illinois' 19th congressional district
- State House District 108
- State Senate District 54
