= Bethel, Illinois =

- Former settlement
- Location within Illinois
- Coordinates: 38°42′15″N 88°41′17″W
- Country: United States
- State: Illinois
- County: Clay
- Elevation: 515 ft (157 m)
- GNIS feature ID: 1747712

Bethel is a former community in Clay County, Illinois, United States. Bethel was located in Songer Township, along a railroad line north of Greendale.
