= Clay City Township, Clay County, Illinois =

Clay City Township
- Township
- Location in Clay County

- Clay County's location in Illinois
- Coordinates: 38°40′N 88°19′W
- Country: United States
- State: Illinois
- County: Clay
- Established: November 5, 1861

Area
  - Total: 40.84 sq mi (105.8 km^{2})
  - Land: 40.29 sq mi (104.4 km^{2})
  - Water: 0.55 sq mi (1.4 km^{2}) 1.35%
- Elevation: 430 ft (131 m)

Population (2020)
  - Total: 1,166
  - Density: 28.94/sq mi (11.17/km^{2})
- Time zone: UTC-6 (CST)
  - Summer (DST): UTC-5 (CDT)
- ZIP code: 62824
- FIPS code: 17-025-14728

Clay City Township is one of twelve townships in Clay County, Illinois, USA. As of the 2020 census, its population was 1,166 and it contained 575 housing units.

== Geography ==
According to the 2010 census, the township (T2&3N R8E) has a total area of 40.84 square miles (105.8 km^{2}), of which 40.29 square miles (104.4 km^{2}) (or 98.65%) is land and 0.55 square miles (1.4 km^{2}) (or 1.35%) is water.

=== Cities, towns, villages ===
- Clay City (vast majority)

=== Unincorporated towns ===
- Camp Travis
- Maysville

(This list is based on USGS data and may include former settlements.)

=== Cemeteries ===
The township contains these three cemeteries: Barnes, Clay City and Travis.

=== Major highways ===
- US Route 50

=== Lakes ===
- Gaskin Lake

== Demographics ==
As of the 2020 census there were 1,166 people, 500 households, and 313 families residing in the township. The population density was 28.59 inhabitants per square mile (11.04/km^{2}). There were 575 housing units at an average density of 14.10 per square mile (5.44/km^{2}). The racial makeup of the township was 97.60% White, 0.00% African American, 0.43% Native American, 0.17% Asian, 0.00% Pacific Islander, 0.00% from other races, and 1.80% from two or more races. Hispanic or Latino of any race were 0.26% of the population.

There were 500 households, out of which 32.20% had children under the age of 18 living with them, 46.80% were married couples living together, 7.60% had a female householder with no spouse present, and 37.40% were non-families. 27.40% of all households were made up of individuals, and 14.80% had someone living alone who was 65 years of age or older. The average household size was 2.41 and the average family size was 2.91.

The township's age distribution consisted of 25.6% under the age of 18, 8.5% from 18 to 24, 27.8% from 25 to 44, 24.4% from 45 to 64, and 13.7% who were 65 years of age or older. The median age was 31.5 years. For every 100 females, there were 88.3 males. For every 100 females age 18 and over, there were 101.1 males.

The median income for a household in the township was $48,370, and the median income for a family was $59,688. Males had a median income of $41,394 versus $26,063 for females. The per capita income for the township was $26,308. About 16.3% of families and 20.5% of the population were below the poverty line, including 34.0% of those under age 18 and 12.7% of those age 65 or over.

Historical population
| Census | Pop. | Note | %± |
|---|---|---|---|
| 2010 | 1,287 | | — |
| 2020 | 1,166 | | −9.4% |
U.S. Decennial Census

== School districts ==
- Clay City Community Unit District 10
- West Richland Community Unit School District 2

== Political districts ==
- Illinois' 19th congressional district
- State House District 108
- State Senate District 54
