= Smallwood Township, Jasper County, Illinois =

Smallwood Township
- Township
- Location in Jasper County

- Jasper County's location in Illinois
- Coordinates: 38°54′13″N 88°12′21″W
- Country: United States
- State: Illinois
- County: Jasper
- Established: November 8, 1859

Area
  - Total: 41.75 sq mi (108.1 km^{2})
  - Land: 41.67 sq mi (107.9 km^{2})
  - Water: 0.08 sq mi (0.21 km^{2}) 0.18%
- Elevation: 551 ft (168 m)

Population (2020)
  - Total: 413
  - Density: 9.91/sq mi (3.83/km^{2})
- Time zone: UTC-6 (CST)
  - Summer (DST): UTC-5 (CDT)
- ZIP codes: 62425, 62448
- FIPS code: 17-079-70200

Smallwood Township is one of eleven townships in Jasper County, Illinois, USA. As of the 2020 census, its population was 413 and it contained 174 housing units.

== Geography ==
According to the 2021 census gazetteer files, Smallwood Township has a total area of 41.75 square miles (108.13 km^{2}), of which 41.67 square miles (107.92 km^{2}) (or 99.82%) is land and 0.08 square miles (0.21 km^{2}) (or 0.18%) is water.

=== Unincorporated towns ===
- Bogota at 38.918378°N 88.240041°W
- Shamrock at 38.890879°N 88.187262°W

(This list is based on USGS data and may include former settlements.)

=== Adjacent townships ===
- Wade Township (north)
- Fox Township (east)
- Preston Township, Richland County (southeast)
- Denver Township, Richland County (south)
- Pixley Township, Clay County (southwest)
- South Muddy Township (west)
- North Muddy Township (northwest)

=== Cemeteries ===
The township contains these seven cemeteries: Cummins, Hankins, Honey, Lancaster, Pleasant Ridge, Tate and Woods.

=== Airports and landing strips ===
- Jasper County Flying Club Airport

=== Lakes ===
- Berry Lake

== Demographics ==
As of the 2020 census there were 413 people, 71 households, and 55 families residing in the township. The population density was 9.89 inhabitants per square mile (3.82/km^{2}). There were 174 housing units at an average density of 4.17 per square mile (1.61/km^{2}). The racial makeup of the township was 97.82% White, 0.00% African American, 0.48% Native American, 0.00% Asian, 0.00% Pacific Islander, 0.24% from other races, and 1.45% from two or more races. Hispanic or Latino of any race were 0.24% of the population.

There were 71 households, out of which 11.30% had children under the age of 18 living with them, 77.46% were married couples living together, 0.00% had a female householder with no spouse present, and 22.54% were non-families. 12.70% of all households were made up of individuals, and 0.00% had someone living alone who was 65 years of age or older. The average household size was 2.38 and the average family size was 2.64.

The township's age distribution consisted of 11.2% under the age of 18, 0.0% from 18 to 24, 11.2% from 25 to 44, 56.8% from 45 to 64, and 20.7% who were 65 years of age or older. The median age was 58.6 years. For every 100 females, there were 164.1 males. For every 100 females age 18 and over, there were 134.4 males.

The median income for a household in the township was $82,386, and the median income for a family was $82,159. Males had a median income of $42,917 versus $33,750 for females. The per capita income for the township was $35,391. No families and 4.1% of the population were below the poverty line, including none of those under age 18 and none of those age 65 or over.

Historical population
Census	Pop.	Note	%±
2000	422		—
2010	411		−2.6%
2020	413		0.5%
U.S. Decennial Census

== School districts ==
- Jasper County Community Unit School District 1

== Political districts ==
- Illinois' 19th congressional district
- State House District 108
- State Senate District 54
