= Louisville Township, Clay County, Illinois =

Louisville Township
- Township
- Location in Clay County

- Clay County's location in Illinois
- Coordinates: 38°47′N 88°32′W
- Country: United States
- State: Illinois
- County: Clay
- Established: November 5, 1861

Area
  - Total: 36.66 sq mi (94.9 km^{2})
  - Land: 36.42 sq mi (94.3 km^{2})
  - Water: 0.24 sq mi (0.62 km^{2}) 0.65%
- Elevation: 472 ft (144 m)

Population (2020)
  - Total: 1,668
  - Density: 45.80/sq mi (17.68/km^{2})
- Time zone: UTC-6 (CST)
  - Summer (DST): UTC-5 (CDT)
- ZIP codes: 62839, 62858
- FIPS code: 17-025-44940

Louisville Township is one of twelve townships in Clay County, Illinois, USA. As of the 2020 census, its population was 1,668 and it contained 734 housing units.

== Geography ==
According to the 2010 census, the township (T4N R6E) has a total area of 36.66 square miles (94.9 km^{2}), of which 36.42 square miles (94.3 km^{2}) (or 99.35%) is land and 0.24 square miles (0.62 km^{2}) (or 0.65%) is water.

=== Cities, towns, villages ===
- Louisville

=== Unincorporated towns ===
- Riffle

(This list is based on USGS data and may include former settlements.)

=== Cemeteries ===
The township contains these eight cemeteries: Brown, Christian Home, Old Louisville, Orchard Hill, Red Brush, Riffle, Speaks and Tolliver.

=== Major highways ===
- US Route 45

== Demographics ==
As of the 2020 census there were 1,668 people, 726 households, and 421 families residing in the township. The population density was 45.51 inhabitants per square mile (17.57/km^{2}). There were 734 housing units at an average density of 20.03 per square mile (7.73/km^{2}). The racial makeup of the township was 94.60% White, 0.12% African American, 0.18% Native American, 0.12% Asian, 0.00% Pacific Islander, 1.62% from other races, and 3.36% from two or more races. Hispanic or Latino of any race were 2.40% of the population.

There were 726 households, out of which 28.70% had children under the age of 18 living with them, 41.74% were married couples living together, 16.25% had a female householder with no spouse present, and 42.01% were non-families. 38.80% of all households were made up of individuals, and 20.50% had someone living alone who was 65 years of age or older. The average household size was 2.23 and the average family size was 2.75.

The township's age distribution consisted of 23.9% under the age of 18, 3.1% from 18 to 24, 31% from 25 to 44, 18.8% from 45 to 64, and 23.1% who were 65 years of age or older. The median age was 40.2 years. For every 100 females, there were 118.2 males. For every 100 females age 18 and over, there were 94.7 males.

The median income for a household in the township was $37,063, and the median income for a family was $46,719. Males had a median income of $39,167 versus $21,731 for females. The per capita income for the township was $23,737. About 23.5% of families and 24.3% of the population were below the poverty line, including 40.9% of those under age 18 and 4.4% of those age 65 or over.

Historical population
Census	Pop.	Note	%±
2010	1,662		—
2020	1,668		0.4%
U.S. Decennial Census

== School districts ==
- North Clay Community Unit School District 25

== Political districts ==
- Illinois' 19th congressional district
- State House District 108
- State Senate District 54
