= Hoosier Township, Clay County, Illinois =

Hoosier Township
- Township
- Location in Clay County

- Clay County's location in Illinois
- Coordinates: 38°47′N 88°25′W
- Country: United States
- State: Illinois
- County: Clay
- Established: November 5, 1861

Area
  - Total: 35.64 sq mi (92.3 km^{2})
  - Land: 35.61 sq mi (92.2 km^{2})
  - Water: 0.03 sq mi (0.078 km^{2}) 0.08%
- Elevation: 463 ft (141 m)

Population (2020)
  - Total: 362
  - Density: 10.2/sq mi (3.92/km^{2})
- Time zone: UTC-6 (CST)
  - Summer (DST): UTC-5 (CDT)
- ZIP codes: 62434, 62824, 62839, 62858, 62879
- FIPS code: 17-025-36087

Hoosier Township is one of twelve townships in Clay County, Illinois, USA. As of the 2020 census, its population was 362 and it contained 148 housing units.

== Geography ==
According to the 2010 census, the township (T4N R7E) has a total area of 35.64 square miles (92.3 km^{2}), of which 35.61 square miles (92.2 km^{2}) (or 99.92%) is land and 0.03 square miles (0.078 km^{2}) (or 0.08%) is water.

=== Cities, towns, villages ===
- Sailor Springs (west quarter)

=== Unincorporated towns ===
- Hoosier

(This list is based on USGS data and may include former settlements.)

=== Cemeteries ===
The township contains these six cemeteries: Dillman, Hoosier Prairie, Kinnamon, McKnight, Number Four and White.

== Demographics ==
As of the 2020 census there were 362 people, 109 households, and 105 families residing in the township. The population density was 10.15 inhabitants per square mile (3.92/km^{2}). There were 148 housing units at an average density of 4.15 per square mile (1.60/km^{2}). The racial makeup of the township was 94.20% White, 0.55% African American, 0.28% Native American, 0.83% Asian, 0.00% Pacific Islander, 0.83% from other races, and 3.31% from two or more races. Hispanic or Latino of any race were 1.38% of the population.

There were 109 households, out of which 39.40% had children under the age of 18 living with them, 96.33% were married couples living together, 0.00% had a female householder with no spouse present, and 3.67% were non-families. 3.70% of all households were made up of individuals, and 0.00% had someone living alone who was 65 years of age or older. The average household size was 2.65 and the average family size was 2.71.

The township's age distribution consisted of 21.8% under the age of 18, none from 18 to 24, 16.6% from 25 to 44, 28% from 45 to 64, and 33.6% who were 65 years of age or older. The median age was 50.4 years. For every 100 females, there were 102.1 males. For every 100 females age 18 and over, there were 121.6 males.

The median income for a household in the township was $79,531, and the median income for a family was $78,906. Males had a median income of $50,769 versus $39,531 for females. The per capita income for the township was $37,379. None of the population was below the poverty line.

Historical population
Census	Pop.	Note	%±
2010	338		—
2020	362		7.1%
U.S. Decennial Census

== School districts ==
- Clay City Community Unit District 10
- North Clay Community Unit School District 25

== Political districts ==
- Illinois' 19th congressional district
- State House District 108
- State Senate District 54
