= Pixley Township, Clay County, Illinois =

Township in Illinois, United States

Pixley Township
- Township
- Location in Clay County

- Clay County's location in Illinois
- Coordinates: 38°47′N 88°19′W
- Country: United States
- State: Illinois
- County: Clay
- Established: November 5, 1861

Area
  - Total: 45.09 sq mi (116.8 km^{2})
  - Land: 45.07 sq mi (116.7 km^{2})
  - Water: 0.02 sq mi (0.052 km^{2}) 0.04%
- Elevation: 453 ft (138 m)

Population (2020)
  - Total: 520
  - Density: 12/sq mi (4.5/km^{2})
- Time zone: UTC-6 (CST)
  - Summer (DST): UTC-5 (CDT)
- ZIP codes: 62434, 62448, 62824, 62858, 62868, 62879
- FIPS code: 17-025-60261

Pixley Township is one of twelve townships in Clay County, Illinois, USA. As of the 2020 census, its population was 520 and it contained 258 housing units.

== Geography ==
According to the 2010 census, the township (T4N R8E) has a total area of 45.09 square miles (116.8 km^{2}), of which 45.07 square miles (116.7 km^{2}) (or 99.96%) is land and 0.02 square miles (0.052 km^{2}) (or 0.04%) is water.

=== Cities, towns, villages ===
- Sailor Springs (east three-quarters)

=== Unincorporated towns ===
- Ingraham
- Wendelin

(This list is based on USGS data and may include former settlements.)

=== Cemeteries ===
The township contains these twelve cemeteries: Ditter, Ingraham, Leonard, Levitte, McKinney, Reed, Saint Johns, Smith, Weidner, Wendelin-Holy Cross, Wesley and Woods.

== Demographics ==
As of the 2020 census there were 520 people, 232 households, and 182 families residing in the township. The population density was 11.53 inhabitants per square mile (4.45/km^{2}). There were 258 housing units at an average density of 5.72 per square mile (2.21/km^{2}). The racial makeup of the township was 95.96% White, 0.00% African American, 0.00% Native American, 0.00% Asian, 0.00% Pacific Islander, 0.19% from other races, and 3.85% from two or more races. Hispanic or Latino of any race were 0.58% of the population.

There were 232 households, out of which 18.10% had children under the age of 18 living with them, 62.93% were married couples living together, 14.66% had a female householder with no spouse present, and 21.55% were non-families. 19.40% of all households were made up of individuals, and 3.40% had someone living alone who was 65 years of age or older. The average household size was 2.08 and the average family size was 2.20.

The township's age distribution consisted of 11.2% under the age of 18, 7.9% from 18 to 24, 13% from 25 to 44, 34.7% from 45 to 64, and 33.3% who were 65 years of age or older. The median age was 57.1 years. For every 100 females, there were 131.1 males. For every 100 females age 18 and over, there were 113.4 males.

The median income for a household in the township was $55,833, and the median income for a family was $63,000. Males had a median income of $32,083 versus $26,328 for females. The per capita income for the township was $30,550. About 10.4% of families and 14.8% of the population were below the poverty line, including 47.1% of those under age 18 and 1.9% of those age 65 or over.

Historical population
Census	Pop.	Note	%±
2010	589		—
2020	520		−11.7%
U.S. Decennial Census

== School districts ==
- Clay City Community Unit District 10
- Jasper County Community Unit School District 1
- West Richland Community Unit School District 2

== Political districts ==
- Illinois' 19th congressional district
- State House District 108
- State Senate District 54
