= Stanford Township, Clay County, Illinois =

Stanford Township
- Township
- Location in Clay County

- Clay County's location in Illinois
- Coordinates: 38°40′N 88°25′W
- Country: United States
- State: Illinois
- County: Clay
- Established: November 5, 1861

Area
  - Total: 53.04 sq mi (137.4 km^{2})
  - Land: 52.98 sq mi (137.2 km^{2})
  - Water: 0.07 sq mi (0.18 km^{2}) 0.13%
- Elevation: 449 ft (137 m)

Population (2020)
  - Total: 625
  - Density: 11.8/sq mi (4.55/km^{2})
- Time zone: UTC-6 (CST)
  - Summer (DST): UTC-5 (CDT)
- ZIP codes: 62824, 62839, 62858
- FIPS code: 17-025-72247

Stanford Township is one of twelve townships in Clay County, Illinois, USA. As of the 2020 census, its population was 625 and it contained 252 housing units.

== Geography ==
According to the 2010 census, the township (T2&3N R7E) has a total area of 53.04 square miles (137.4 km^{2}), of which 52.98 square miles (137.2 km^{2}) (or 99.89%) is land and 0.07 square miles (0.18 km^{2}) (or 0.13%) is water.

=== Cities, towns, villages ===
- Clay City (west edge)
- Flora (east quarter)

=== Cemeteries ===
The township contains these five cemeteries: Bloom, Kneff, McCawley, Mount Zion United Brethren and Rusk.

=== Major highways ===
- US Route 45
- US Route 50

=== Airports and landing strips ===
- Flora Municipal Airport

== Demographics ==
As of the 2020 census there were 625 people, 264 households, and 197 families residing in the township. The population density was 11.79 inhabitants per square mile (4.55/km^{2}). There were 252 housing units at an average density of 4.75 per square mile (1.83/km^{2}). The racial makeup of the township was 93.44% White, 0.32% African American, 0.64% Native American, 0.48% Asian, 0.16% Pacific Islander, 0.16% from other races, and 4.80% from two or more races. Hispanic or Latino of any race were 1.60% of the population.

There were 264 households, out of which 47.00% had children under the age of 18 living with them, 62.50% were married couples living together, 12.12% had a female householder with no spouse present, and 25.38% were non-families. 23.90% of all households were made up of individuals, and 11.40% had someone living alone who was 65 years of age or older. The average household size was 2.21 and the average family size was 2.49.

The township's age distribution consisted of 31.2% under the age of 18, 4.5% from 18 to 24, 19.5% from 25 to 44, 29.4% from 45 to 64, and 15.6% who were 65 years of age or older. The median age was 40.8 years. For every 100 females, there were 76.4 males. For every 100 females age 18 and over, there were 96.1 males.

The median income for a household in the township was $82,250, and the median income for a family was $105,203. Males had a median income of $56,458 versus $45,577 for females. The per capita income for the township was $30,478. About 0.0% of families and 3.6% of the population were below the poverty line, including 0.0% of those under age 18 and 13.2% of those age 65 or over.

Historical population
Census	Pop.	Note	%±
2010	599		—
2020	625		4.3%
U.S. Decennial Census

== School districts ==
- Clay City Community Unit District 10
- Flora Community Unit School District 35
- North Clay Community Unit School District 25

== Political districts ==
- Illinois' 19th congressional district
- State House District 108
- State Senate District 54
