= Harter Township, Clay County, Illinois =

Harter Township
- Township
- Location in Clay County

- Clay County's location in Illinois
- Coordinates: 38°40′N 88°32′W
- Country: United States
- State: Illinois
- County: Clay
- Established: November 5, 1861

Area
  - Total: 55.97 sq mi (145.0 km^{2})
  - Land: 55.86 sq mi (144.7 km^{2})
  - Water: 0.1 sq mi (0.26 km^{2}) 0.18%
- Elevation: 482 ft (147 m)

Population (2020)
  - Total: 6,159
  - Density: 110.3/sq mi (42.57/km^{2})
- Time zone: UTC-6 (CST)
  - Summer (DST): UTC-5 (CDT)
- ZIP codes: 62839, 62858, 62899
- FIPS code: 17-025-33266

Harter Township is one of twelve townships in Clay County, Illinois, USA. As of the 2020 census, its population was 6,159 and it contained 2,871 housing units.

== Geography ==
According to the 2010 census, the township (T2&3N R6E) has a total area of 55.97 square miles (145.0 km^{2}), of which 55.86 square miles (144.7 km^{2}) (or 99.80%) is land and 0.1 square miles (0.26 km^{2}) (or 0.18%) is water.

=== Cities, towns, villages ===
- Flora (west three-quarters)

=== Unincorporated towns ===
- Kenner

(This list is based on USGS data and may include former settlements.)

=== Cemeteries ===
The township contains these seven cemeteries: Elmwood, Garden of Memories, Golden, Jenkins, Logan Family, Meisenheimer and Saint Stephens.

=== Major highways ===
- US Route 45
- US Route 50

=== Airports and landing strips ===
- Clay County Hospital Heliport

=== Lakes ===
- Trago Lake

=== Landmarks ===
- Charley Brown Park

== Demographics ==
As of the 2020 census there were 6,159 people, 2,561 households, and 1,551 families residing in the township. The population density was 110.09 inhabitants per square mile (42.51/km^{2}). There were 2,871 housing units at an average density of 51.32 per square mile (19.81/km^{2}). The racial makeup of the township was 92.92% White, 0.44% African American, 0.36% Native American, 1.01% Asian, 0.03% Pacific Islander, 0.91% from other races, and 4.34% from two or more races. Hispanic or Latino of any race were 2.11% of the population.

There were 2,561 households, out of which 24.80% had children under the age of 18 living with them, 46.47% were married couples living together, 6.68% had a female householder with no spouse present, and 39.44% were non-families. 30.50% of all households were made up of individuals, and 15.30% had someone living alone who was 65 years of age or older. The average household size was 2.30 and the average family size was 2.80.

The township's age distribution consisted of 21.9% under the age of 18, 8.2% from 18 to 24, 23.2% from 25 to 44, 27.9% from 45 to 64, and 18.9% who were 65 years of age or older. The median age was 41.9 years. For every 100 females, there were 93.7 males. For every 100 females age 18 and over, there were 85.4 males.

The median income for a household in the township was $53,831, and the median income for a family was $69,190. Males had a median income of $47,149 versus $31,758 for females. The per capita income for the township was $34,434. About 8.3% of families and 14.3% of the population were below the poverty line, including 14.0% of those under age 18 and 8.3% of those age 65 or over.

Historical population
Census	Pop.	Note	%±
2010	6,394		—
2020	6,159		−3.7%
U.S. Decennial Census

== School districts ==
- Flora Community Unit School District 35
- North Clay Community Unit School District 25

== Political districts ==
- Illinois' 19th congressional district
- State House District 108
- State Senate District 54
