= Stanford Township =

Stanford Township may refer to the following townships in the United States:

- Stanford Township, Clay County, Illinois
- Stanford Township, Isanti County, Minnesota
