= Fox Township, Jasper County, Illinois =

Fox Township
- Township
- Location in Jasper County

- Jasper County's location in Illinois
- Coordinates: 38°54′35″N 88°06′01″W
- Country: United States
- State: Illinois
- County: Jasper
- Established: Before 1901

Area
  - Total: 40.51 sq mi (104.9 km^{2})
  - Land: 40.43 sq mi (104.7 km^{2})
  - Water: 0.08 sq mi (0.21 km^{2}) 0.20%
- Elevation: 502 ft (153 m)

Population (2020)
  - Total: 442
  - Density: 10.9/sq mi (4.22/km^{2})
- Time zone: UTC-6 (CST)
  - Summer (DST): UTC-5 (CDT)
- ZIP codes: 62448, 62475, 62480
- FIPS code: 17-079-27390

Fox Township is one of eleven townships in Jasper County, Illinois, USA. As of the 2020 census, its population was 442 and it contained 197 housing units.

== Geography ==
According to the 2021 census gazetteer files, Fox Township has a total area of 40.51 square miles (104.92 km^{2}), of which 40.43 square miles (104.71 km^{2}) (or 99.80%) is land and 0.08 square miles (0.21 km^{2}) (or 0.20%) is water.

=== Unincorporated towns ===
- Boos at 38.930044°N 88.110871°W
- West Liberty at 38.853379°N 88.084482°W

(This list is based on USGS data and may include former settlements.)

=== Adjacent townships ===
- Willow Hill Township (northeast)
- Sainte Marie Township (east)
- Preston Township, Richland County (south)
- Denver Township, Richland County (southwest)
- Smallwood Township (west)
- Wade Township (northwest)

=== Cemeteries ===
The township contains this cemetery: Bethel(Quaker)

=== Major highways ===
- Illinois Route 130

== Demographics ==
As of the 2020 census there were 442 people, 238 households, and 179 families residing in the township. The population density was 10.91 inhabitants per square mile (4.21/km^{2}). There were 197 housing units at an average density of 4.86 per square mile (1.88/km^{2}). The racial makeup of the township was 98.42% White, 0.00% African American, 0.00% Native American, 0.00% Asian, 0.00% Pacific Islander, 0.45% from other races, and 1.13% from two or more races. Hispanic or Latino of any race were 0.00% of the population.

There were 238 households, out of which 33.60% had children under the age of 18 living with them, 61.76% were married couples living together, 9.66% had a female householder with no spouse present, and 24.79% were non-families. 24.80% of all households were made up of individuals, and 9.20% had someone living alone who was 65 years of age or older. The average household size was 2.87 and the average family size was 3.33.

The township's age distribution consisted of 29.7% under the age of 18, 12.9% from 18 to 24, 17.5% from 25 to 44, 31.5% from 45 to 64, and 8.5% who were 65 years of age or older. The median age was 30.6 years. For every 100 females, there were 160.7 males. For every 100 females age 18 and over, there were 162.3 males.

The median income for a household in the township was $60,968, and the median income for a family was $61,169. Males had a median income of $34,722 versus $14,840 for females. The per capita income for the township was $24,384. About 24.6% of families and 17.4% of the population were below the poverty line, including 14.3% of those under age 18 and 17.2% of those age 65 or over.

Historical population
Census	Pop.	Note	%±
2000	540		—
2010	512		−5.2%
2020	442		−13.7%
U.S. Decennial Census

== School districts ==
- East Richland Community Unit School District 1
- Jasper County Community Unit School District 1

== Political districts ==
- Illinois' 19th congressional district
- State House District 108
- State Senate District 54
