= Xenia Township =

Xenia Township may refer to the following townships in the United States:

- Xenia Township, Clay County, Illinois
- Xenia Township, Greene County, Ohio
