= North Clay High School =

Location
- 500 S. Route 45; Louisville, Illinois 62858; USA
- 38.76631°N 88.50897°W

Information
- School type: public high school
- School district: North Clay Unit District #25
- Teaching staff: 16.94 (FTE)
- Grades: 9 – 12
- Gender: Co-ed
- Enrollment: 164 (2023–2024)
- Student to teacher ratio: 9.68
- Campus: rural
- Colors: Scarlet and Black
- Team name: Cardinals
- Website: sites.google.com/northclayschools.com/nccusd25/high-school

North Clay High School, also called Louisville-North Clay or just Louisville, is a public high school serving students in grades 9-12 in northern Clay County, Illinois, USA. It is the only high school in the North Clay Unit School District #25.

== Athletics ==
The school offers baseball (fall and spring), Girls softball, volleyball, Boys and Girls basketball and cross country. The school competes in the IHSA as part of the Midland Trail conference.

== School song ==
Rally sons of North Clay High
Sing her glory up to the sky
Rally Cheer her color's true and cheer her team on through
Rah, rah for North Clay High

Cheer, cheer for ole North Clay High
Wake up the echoes, victory is nigh
Send the rally cheer on high
Shake down the thunder from the sky.

Although our odds be great or small
Ole North Clay High will win over all
While our Loyal Sons are marching onward to victory.

(Repeat from Cheer, cheer for ole North Clay High)

(After the second time through the cheerleaders yell:)

Cha ha, Cha ha, Cha ha ha ha
North Clay Cardinals
Rah, Rah, Rah

== Notable alumni ==
- Darren Bailey (b. 1966), politician and former congressional candidate.
- Bailey Zimmerman (b. 2000), country artist
