= Wade Township, Jasper County, Illinois =

Wade Township
- Township
- Location in Jasper County

- Jasper County's location in Illinois
- Coordinates: 39°00′49″N 88°10′51″W
- Country: United States
- State: Illinois
- County: Jasper
- Established: November 8, 1859

Area
  - Total: 74.33 sq mi (192.5 km^{2})
  - Land: 73.96 sq mi (191.6 km^{2})
  - Water: 0.37 sq mi (0.96 km^{2}) 0.50%
- Elevation: 505 ft (154 m)

Population (2020)
  - Total: 4,380
  - Density: 59.2/sq mi (22.9/km^{2})
- Time zone: UTC-6 (CST)
  - Summer (DST): UTC-5 (CDT)
- ZIP codes: 62448, 62479
- FIPS code: 17-079-78357

Wade Township is one of eleven townships in Jasper County, Illinois, USA. As of the 2020 census, its population was 4,380 and it contained 2,048 housing units.

== Geography ==
According to the 2021 census gazetteer files, Wade Township has a total area of 74.33 square miles (192.51 km^{2}), of which 73.96 square miles (191.56 km^{2}) (or 99.50%) is land and 0.37 square miles (0.96 km^{2}) (or 0.50%) is water.

=== Cities, towns, villages ===
- Newton

=== Unincorporated towns ===
- Falmouth at 39.054764°N 88.145594°W
- Lis at 39.020043°N 88.260319°W

(This list is based on USGS data and may include former settlements.)

=== Adjacent townships ===
- Crooked Creek Township (northeast)
- Hunt City Township (east)
- Willow Hill Township (east)
- Fox Township (southeast)
- Smallwood Township (south)
- South Muddy Township (southwest)
- North Muddy Township (west)
- Grove Township (northwest)

=== Cemeteries ===
The township contains these twenty-two cemeteries: Bowers, Brick, Burford, Carter, Christian Chapel, Coburn, Gila Lutheran, Higgins/Colburn, Hickory, Jasper Family, Jones, Kibler, Liberty, Miller/Yager, Mt Calvery, New Saint Peters, Old Jasper County Poor Farm, Old Saint Peters, Redford, Riverside, Vanderhoof and West Lawn.

=== Major highways ===
- Illinois Route 33
- Illinois Route 130

=== Airports and landing strips ===
- Jasper County Safety Council Heliport

=== Rivers ===
- Embarras River

=== Lakes ===
- Glen Lake

=== Landmarks ===
- Sam Parr State Fish and Wildlife Area

== Demographics ==
As of the 2020 census there were 4,380 people, 1,883 households, and 1,204 families residing in the township. The population density was 58.93 inhabitants per square mile (22.75/km^{2}). There were 2,048 housing units at an average density of 27.55 per square mile (10.64/km^{2}). The racial makeup of the township was 96.26% White, 0.48% African American, 0.14% Native American, 0.16% Asian, 0.05% Pacific Islander, 0.46% from other races, and 2.47% from two or more races. Hispanic or Latino of any race were 1.23% of the population.

There were 1,883 households, out of which 23.60% had children under the age of 18 living with them, 49.65% were married couples living together, 9.61% had a female householder with no spouse present, and 36.06% were non-families. 30.00% of all households were made up of individuals, and 13.20% had someone living alone who was 65 years of age or older. The average household size was 2.29 and the average family size was 2.84.

The township's age distribution consisted of 19.3% under the age of 18, 8.6% from 18 to 24, 20.8% from 25 to 44, 28.7% from 45 to 64, and 22.6% who were 65 years of age or older. The median age was 46.1 years. For every 100 females, there were 99.3 males. For every 100 females age 18 and over, there were 89.8 males.

The median income for a household in the township was $50,773, and the median income for a family was $68,152. Males had a median income of $42,382 versus $24,803 for females. The per capita income for the township was $27,624. About 12.5% of families and 14.2% of the population were below the poverty line, including 24.8% of those under age 18 and 12.4% of those age 65 or over.

Historical population
Census	Pop.	Note	%±
2000	4,734		—
2010	4,475		−5.5%
2020	4,380		−2.1%
U.S. Decennial Census

== School districts ==
- Jasper County Community Unit School District 1

== Political districts ==
- Illinois's 19th congressional district
- State House District 108
- State Senate District 54
