= Bible Grove Township, Clay County, Illinois =

Bible Grove Township
- Township
- Location in Clay County

- Clay County's location in Illinois
- Coordinates: 38°52′N 88°25′W
- Country: United States
- State: Illinois
- County: Clay
- Established: November 5, 1861

Area
  - Total: 35.52 sq mi (92.0 km^{2})
  - Land: 35.49 sq mi (91.9 km^{2})
  - Water: 0.02 sq mi (0.052 km^{2}) 0.06%
- Elevation: 505 ft (154 m)

Population (2020)
  - Total: 330
  - Density: 9.3/sq mi (3.6/km^{2})
- Time zone: UTC-6 (CST)
  - Summer (DST): UTC-5 (CDT)
- ZIP codes: 62434, 62858
- FIPS code: 17-025-05807

Bible Grove Township is one of twelve townships in Clay County, Illinois, USA. As of the 2020 census, its population was 330 and it contained 146 housing units.

== Geography ==
According to the 2010 census, the township has a total area of 35.52 square miles (92.0 km^{2}), of which 35.49 square miles (91.9 km^{2}) (or 99.92%) is land and 0.02 square miles (0.052 km^{2}) (or 0.06%) is water.

=== Unincorporated towns ===
- Bible Grove

(This list is based on USGS data and may include former settlements.)

=== History - Grand Army of the Republic ===
- The G.A.R. had a post known as the Bible Grove Post, No. 360. It was organized by William Mattoon November 14, 1883, in Georgetown. It received its charter October 30, 1883. The following were charter members: Theoren Gould, John B. Cogswell, Elias Booze, James Connerley, Richard McWilliams, Leonard Wolf, William B. Corder, John Cottrell, S. G. Curtright, Henry Nash, M. N. Lewis, E. T. Ryan, William P. Lewis, Robert Carrick, Jesse B. Vickrey. Jacob Rinehart, Joseph Killifer, Joseph Harper and Joseph Cook. The first officers: Theoren Gould, Commander; John B. Cogswell, Senior Vice Commander; Henry Nash, Junior Vice Commander; Leonard Wolf, Adjutant; Moses M. Lewis, Quartermaster;John Cottrell, Surgeon; Richard McWilliams, Chaplain; Joseph Killifer. Officer of the Day; William B. Corder, Officer of the Guard; W. P. Lewis, Sergeant Mayor; Joseph Harper, Quartermaster Sergeant.
- In the book 'Proceedings And Official Reports Of The... Annual Encampment of The Department of Illinois G.A.R, Volumes 14-22' in a Report of the Assistant Adjutant General dated Chicago, January 31, 1886, was reported that Post 360 Bible Grove had surrendered their charter.

=== Cemeteries ===
The township contains these six cemeteries: Brooks, Burke, German, Lewis, Saint Paul and Shouse Chapel.

== Demographics ==
As of the 2020 census there were 330 people, 74 households, and 64 families residing in the township. The population density was 9.29 inhabitants per square mile (3.59/km^{2}). There were 146 housing units at an average density of 4.11 per square mile (1.59/km^{2}). The racial makeup of the township was 94.85% White, 0.30% African American, 0.30% Native American, 0.61% Asian, 0.00% Pacific Islander, 0.30% from other races, and 3.64% from two or more races. Hispanic or Latino of any race were 1.21% of the population.

There were 74 households, out of which 25.70% had children under the age of 18 living with them, 60.81% were married couples living together, 13.51% had a female householder with no spouse present, and 13.51% were non-families. 13.50% of all households were made up of individuals, and 13.50% had someone living alone who was 65 years of age or older. The average household size was 2.76 and the average family size was 2.47.

The township's age distribution consisted of 27.9% under the age of 18, 8.3% from 18 to 24, 13.7% from 25 to 44, 45.2% from 45 to 64, and 4.9% who were 65 years of age or older. The median age was 46.0 years. For every 100 females, there were 64.5 males. For every 100 females age 18 and over, there were 93.4 males.

The median income for a household in the township was $113,021, and the median income for a family was $113,542. Males had a median income of $60,729 versus $43,631 for females. The per capita income for the township was $31,506. No families and 7.7% of the population were below the poverty line.

Historical population
| Census | Pop. | Note | %± |
|---|---|---|---|
| 2010 | 344 | | — |
| 2020 | 330 | | −4.1% |
U.S. Decennial Census

== School districts ==
- Clay City Community Unit District 10
- Dieterich Community Unit School District 30
- Jasper County Community Unit School District 1
- North Clay Community Unit School District 25
