= Oskaloosa Township =

Oskaloosa Township may refer to the following townships in the United States:

- Oskaloosa Township, Clay County, Illinois
- Oskaloosa Township, Jefferson County, Kansas
