= Island Grove, Jasper County, Illinois =

Island Grove
- Unincorporated community
- Location within Illinois Location within the United States
- Coordinates: 39°06′09″N 88°20′07″W
- Country: United States
- State: Illinois
- County: Jasper
- Township: Grove
- Elevation: 627 ft (191 m)
- Time zone: UTC-6 (Central (CST))
  - Summer (DST): UTC-5 (CDT)
- Area code: 618
- GNIS feature ID: 1725219

Island Grove is an unincorporated community in Grove Township, Jasper County, Illinois, United States. Island Grove is located on County Route 12, 4 miles (6.4 km) north-northwest of Wheeler.
