= Hoosier, Illinois =

- Unincorporated community
- Location within Illinois Location within the United States
- Coordinates: 38°48′13″N 88°27′18″W
- Country: United States
- State: Illinois
- County: Clay
- Elevation: 476 ft (145 m)
- Time zone: UTC-6 (Central (CST))
  - Summer (DST): UTC-5 (CDT)
- Area code: 618
- GNIS feature ID: 1747729

Hoosier is an unincorporated community in Clay County, Illinois, United States. Hoosier is 4 miles (6.4 km) northeast of Louisville.
