= Bible Grove, Illinois =

- Unincorporated community
- Location within Illinois Location within the United States
- Coordinates: 38°52′19″N 88°26′46″W
- Country: United States
- State: Illinois
- County: Clay
- Elevation: 509 ft (155 m)
- Time zone: UTC-6 (Central (CST))
  - Summer (DST): UTC-5 (CDT)
- Area code: 618
- GNIS feature ID: 404371

Bible Grove is an unincorporated community in Clay County, Illinois, United States. Bible Grove is 9 miles (14 km) northeast of Louisville. Bible Grove once had a post office, which closed on October 22, 1988.

MLB pitcher George Lyons was born in Bible Grove in 1891.

== See also ==
- Bible Grove, Missouri
