= Iola, Illinois =

- Village
- Location of Iola in Clay County, Illinois.
- Coordinates: 38°50′03″N 88°37′30″W
- Country: United States
- State: Illinois
- County: Clay

Government
  - Village president: William Laycoax

Area
  - Total: 0.97 sq mi (2.50 km^{2})
  - Land: 0.97 sq mi (2.50 km^{2})
  - Water: 0 sq mi (0.00 km^{2})
- Elevation: 525 ft (160 m)

Population (2020)
  - Total: 98
  - Density: 101.6/sq mi (39.24/km^{2})
- Time zone: UTC-6 (CST)
  - Summer (DST): UTC-5 (CDT)
- ZIP code: 62838
- Area code: 618
- FIPS code: 17-37621
- GNIS feature ID: 2398579
- Website: https://iolaillinois.org/

Iola is a village in Clay County, Illinois, United States. The population was 98 at the 2020 census.

== Geography ==
Iola is located in northwestern Clay County. Louisville, the county seat, is 9 miles (14 km) to the southwest.

According to the 2021 census gazetteer files, Iola has a total area of 0.96 square miles (2.49 km^{2}), all land.

== Demographics ==
Historical population
Census	Pop.	Note	%±
1920	279		—
1930	243		−12.9%
1940	256		5.3%
1950	213		−16.8%
1960	155		−27.2%
1970	163		5.2%
1980	178		9.2%
1990	163		−8.4%
2000	171		4.9%
2010	141		−17.5%
2020	98		−30.5%
U.S. Decennial Census

As of the 2020 census there were 98 people, 34 households, and 28 families residing in the village. The population density was 101.66 inhabitants per square mile (39.25/km^{2}). There were 47 housing units at an average density of 48.76 per square mile (18.83/km^{2}). The racial makeup of the village was 94.90% White, 2.04% from other races, and 3.06% from two or more races. No residents reported an ethnicity of Hispanic or Latino.

There were 34 households, out of which 58.8% had children under the age of 18 living with them, 70.59% were married couples living together, 0.00% had a female householder with no husband present, and 17.65% were non-families. 8.82% of all households were made up of individuals, and 5.88% had someone living alone who was 65 years of age or older. The average household size was 2.86 and the average family size was 2.68.

The village's age distribution consisted of 29.7% under the age of 18, 8.8% from 18 to 24, 34.1% from 25 to 44, 19.8% from 45 to 64, and 7.7% who were 65 years of age or older. The median age was 27.9 years. For every 100 females, there were 133.3 males. For every 100 females age 18 and over, there were 120.7 males.

The median income for a household in the village was $50,000, and the median income for a family was $55,500. Males had a median income of $43,750 versus $17,083 for females. The per capita income for the village was $19,992. About 7.1% of families and 11.1% of the population were below the poverty line, including 3.8% of those under age 18 and 14.3% of those age 65 or over.
