= Ingraham, Illinois =

- Unincorporated community
- Location within Illinois Location within the United States
- Coordinates: 38°50′10″N 88°20′02″W
- Country: United States
- State: Illinois
- County: Clay
- Elevation: 489 ft (149 m)
- Time zone: UTC-6 (Central (CST))
  - Summer (DST): UTC-5 (CDT)
- Area code: 618
- GNIS feature ID: 410899

Ingraham is an unincorporated community in Clay County, Illinois, United States. Ingraham is 6 miles (9.7 km) north-northeast of Sailor Springs.
