= West Liberty, Illinois =

- Unincorporated community
- Location within Illinois Location within the United States
- Coordinates: 38°51′09″N 88°05′07″W
- Country: United States
- State: Illinois
- County: Jasper
- Township: Fox

Area
  - Total: 0.51 sq mi (1.32 km^{2})
  - Land: 0.51 sq mi (1.32 km^{2})
  - Water: 0 sq mi (0.00 km^{2})
- Elevation: 482 ft (147 m)

Population (2020)
  - Total: 96
  - Density: 188/sq mi (72.6/km^{2})
- Time zone: UTC-6 (CST)
  - Summer (DST): UTC-5 (CDT)
- ZIP code: 62475
- FIPS code: 17–80580
- GNIS feature ID: 2806579

West Liberty is an unincorporated community and Census-designated Place in Fox Township, Jasper County, Illinois, United States. The population was 96 at the 2020 census.

West Liberty first appeared as a census designated place in the 2020 U.S. census.

== Geography ==
According to the 2021 census gazetteer files, West Liberty has a total area of 0.51 square miles (1.32 km^{2}), all land.

== Demographics ==
Historical population
Census	Pop.	Note	%±
2020	96		—

As of the 2020 census there were 96 people, 75 households, and 48 families residing in the CDP. The population density was 187.87 inhabitants per square mile (72.54/km^{2}). There were 45 housing units at an average density of 88.06 per square mile (34.00/km^{2}). The racial makeup of the CDP was 98.96% White, 0.00% African American, 0.00% Native American, 0.00% Asian, 0.00% Pacific Islander, 0.00% from other races, and 1.04% from two or more races. Hispanic or Latino of any race were 0.00% of the population.

There were 75 households, out of which 24.0% had children under the age of 18 living with them, 52.00% were married couples living together, 12.00% had a female householder with no husband present, and 36.00% were non-families. 36.00% of all households were made up of individuals, and 0.00% had someone living alone who was 65 years of age or older. The average household size was 2.85 and the average family size was 2.56.

The CDP's age distribution consisted of 23.4% under the age of 18, 10.4% from 18 to 24, 19.8% from 25 to 44, 46.3% from 45 to 64, and 0.0% who were 65 years of age or older. The median age was 28.4 years. For every 100 females, there were 178.3 males. For every 100 females age 18 and over, there were 162.5 males.

The per capita income for the CDP was $16,819. About 62.5% of families and 39.6% of the population were below the poverty line.
