= Camp Travis, Illinois =

- Unincorporated community
- Location within Illinois Location within the United States
- Coordinates: 38°39′36″N 88°19′53″W
- Country: United States
- State: Illinois
- County: Clay
- Elevation: 449 ft (137 m)
- Time zone: UTC-6 (Central (CST))
  - Summer (DST): UTC-5 (CDT)
- Area code: 618
- GNIS feature ID: 405507

For the former U.S. Army training camp in Texas, see Fort Travis

Camp Travis is an unincorporated community in Clay County, Illinois, United States. Camp Travis is 2 miles (3.2 km) southeast of Clay City.
