= Clay City, Illinois =

Clay City
- Village
- Location of Clay City in Clay County, Illinois.
- Coordinates: 38°41′09″N 88°20′55″W
- Country: United States
- State: Illinois
- County: Clay

Government
  - Village president: Rod Franklin

Area
  - Total: 1.78 sq mi (4.61 km^{2})
  - Land: 1.78 sq mi (4.61 km^{2})
  - Water: 0 sq mi (0.00 km^{2})
- Elevation: 436 ft (133 m)

Population (2020)
  - Total: 847
  - Density: 475.4/sq mi (183.56/km^{2})
- Time zone: UTC-6 (CST)
  - Summer (DST): UTC-5 (CDT)
- ZIP code: 62824
- Area code: 618
- FIPS code: 17-14715
- GNIS feature ID: 2397637
- Website: https://www.villageofclaycityil.com/

Clay City is a village in Clay County, Illinois, United States. The population was 847 at the 2020 census. Clay City was named for the Kentucky statesman Henry Clay.

== Geography ==
Clay City is located in southeastern Clay County about 1 mile (1.6 km) southwest of the Little Wabash River. U.S. Route 50 passes through the southern side of the village, leading west 7 miles (11 km) to Flora and east 15 miles (24 km) to Olney. Louisville, the Clay County seat, is 14 miles (23 km) to the northwest.

According to the 2021 census gazetteer files, Clay City has a total area of 1.78 square miles (4.61 km^{2}), all land.

== Demographics ==
Historical population
| Census | Pop. | Note | %± |
|---|---|---|---|
| 1870 | 594 | | — |
| 1880 | 612 | | 3.0% |
| 1900 | 907 | | — |
| 1910 | 837 | | −7.7% |
| 1920 | 648 | | −22.6% |
| 1930 | 707 | | 9.1% |
| 1940 | 1,136 | | 60.7% |
| 1950 | 1,103 | | −2.9% |
| 1960 | 1,144 | | 3.7% |
| 1970 | 1,049 | | −8.3% |
| 1980 | 1,038 | | −1.0% |
| 1990 | 929 | | −10.5% |
| 2000 | 1,000 | | 7.6% |
| 2010 | 959 | | −4.1% |
| 2020 | 847 | | −11.7% |
U.S. Decennial Census

As of the 2020 census there were 847 people, 356 households, and 239 families residing in the village. The population density was 475.31 inhabitants per square mile (183.52/km^{2}). There were 432 housing units at an average density of 242.42 per square mile (93.60/km^{2}). The racial makeup of the village was 97.52% White, 0.24% Native American, 0.12% Asian, and 2.13% from two or more races. Hispanic or Latino of any race were 0.24% of the population.

There were 356 households, out of which 35.7% had children under the age of 18 living with them, 51.12% were married couples living together, 8.43% had a female householder with no husband present, and 32.87% were non-families. 29.49% of all households were made up of individuals, and 19.38% had someone living alone who was 65 years of age or older. The average household size was 3.07, and the average family size was 2.52.

The village's age distribution consisted of 28.8% under the age of 18, 7.6% from 18 to 24, 25.6% from 25 to 44, 21.8% from 45 to 64, and 16.2% who were 65 years of age or older. The median age was 31.9 years. For every 100 females, there were 82.9 males. For every 100 females age 18 and over, there were 93.9 males.

The median income for a household in the village was $45,104, and the median income for a family was $49,688. Males had a median income of $36,875 versus $21,875 for females. The per capita income for the village was $23,317. About 19.7% of families and 22.1% of the population were below the poverty line, including 39.1% of those under age 18 and 14.5% of those age 65 or over.

== History ==
In the early 1800s, Solomon Harter Mueller (later Miller) came to Clay City with his Cherokee wife (later Ida) and 6 children from West Virginia to establish a farm and grinding mill. He later built a smokehouse, general store, and milinary shop. Solomon also brought his brother George C. with his wife Caroline and 5 children. Solomon and Ida had children: Isom, Mary, Otto, Roy, Louise, and Zella, all born in Clay City. Louise's great-grandchildren, Wallace and Caroline, left Clay City for St. Louis. Paul George left for Ohio and ultimately lost oil and mineral rights in Clay City.

In 1810, John McCawley and Seth Evans were traveling west from Fort Vincennes along the old Buffalo Trace when one of their horses died. McCawley sent his companion back for another horse. McCawley stayed behind in a cabin built on the west bank of the Little Wabash River just south and east of the future Clay City. This made McCawley the first white man to settle in this area. McCawley later decided to build a stagecoach stop and trading center on the location, which was known as McCawley's Tavern.

Clay County was created by an act of the legislature on December 23, 1824. On Tuesday, March 8, 1825, at John McCawley's place, the first county commissioners' court assembled for the new county of Clay. In 1825, Daniel May donated 20 acres (81,000 m^{2}) of land, just over 2 miles (3 km) west of McCawley's Tavern, to the county for the purpose of constructing a courthouse. This land is one block south of US 50 and to the west of what is now South Main Street. This area had previously been known as Hubbardsville but was renamed Maysville. A two-room courthouse was constructed in 1825, and court was held at Maysville until 1841, when it was moved to the new and present county seat, Louisville.

In 1855, after the Ohio and Mississippi Railway was located about 1 mile (1.6 km) north of Maysville, Clay City was established by Mr. J.D. Perkey on the north side of the tracks and mostly to the east of the present North Main Street. The business district soon developed to the south of the tracks, where it is presently located. Maysville was made a part of the village of Clay City in 1862.

Clay City served as a trading center for the surrounding countryside. Farmers could bring their produce to town and trade it for dry goods, etc., and very little money would change hands. With the passenger trains stopping in Clay City, it also served as a source of transportation for the surrounding area. Many of the tourists who traveled to the once famous resort of Sailor Springs would take the train to Clay City and then use local transportation on up to Sailor Springs.

In 1936, oil was discovered in this area, and oil-related businesses continue to thrive in Clay City today.

== Notable persons ==
- Bernardine Flynn, radio and television actress of the Vic & Sade radio program, retired to Clay City
- Hal Wiltse, pitcher for the Boston Red Sox, St. Louis Browns and Philadelphia Phillies, born in Clay City
