= Oskaloosa, Illinois =

- Unincorporated community
- Location within Illinois Location within the United States
- Coordinates: 38°45′35″N 88°38′56″W
- Country: United States
- State: Illinois
- County: Clay
- Elevation: 518 ft (158 m)
- Time zone: UTC-6 (Central (CST))
  - Summer (DST): UTC-5 (CDT)
- Area code: 618
- GNIS feature ID: 415195

Oskaloosa is an unincorporated community in Clay County, Illinois, United States. Oskaloosa is west of Louisville.
