= Larkinsburg Township, Clay County, Illinois =

Larkinsburg Township
- Township
- Location in Clay County

- Clay County's location in Illinois
- Coordinates: 38°53′N 88°38′W
- Country: United States
- State: Illinois
- County: Clay
- Established: November 5, 1861

Area
  - Total: 37.22 sq mi (96.4 km^{2})
  - Land: 37.12 sq mi (96.1 km^{2})
  - Water: 0.1 sq mi (0.26 km^{2}) 0.27%
- Elevation: 499 ft (152 m)

Population (2020)
  - Total: 569
  - Density: 15.3/sq mi (5.92/km^{2})
- Time zone: UTC-6 (CST)
  - Summer (DST): UTC-5 (CDT)
- ZIP codes: 62426, 62838, 62858
- FIPS code: 17-025-42158

Larkinsburg Township is one of twelve townships in Clay County, Illinois, USA. As of the 2020 census, its population was 569 and it contained 279 housing units.

== Geography ==
According to the 2010 census, the township (T5N R5E) has a total area of 37.22 square miles (96.4 km^{2}), of which 37.12 square miles (96.1 km^{2}) (or 99.73%) is land and 0.1 square miles (0.26 km^{2}) (or 0.27%) is water.

=== Cities, towns, villages ===
- Iola

=== Cemeteries ===
The township contains these eight cemeteries: Burge, Fender, Iola, Keen Chapel, Littleton, Price, Rodgers and Woods.

=== Major highways ===
- Interstate 57

=== Lakes ===
- Mc Arthur Lake
- Patterson Lake

== Demographics ==
As of the 2020 census there were 569 people, 255 households, and 220 families residing in the township. The population density was 15.29 inhabitants per square mile (5.90/km^{2}). There were 279 housing units at an average density of 7.50 per square mile (2.90/km^{2}). The racial makeup of the township was 95.43% White, 0.00% African American, 0.18% Native American, 0.00% Asian, 0.00% Pacific Islander, 0.53% from other races, and 3.87% from two or more races. Hispanic or Latino of any race were 0.70% of the population.

There were 255 households, out of which 50.20% had children under the age of 18 living with them, 71.37% were married couples living together, 13.33% had a female householder with no spouse present, and 13.73% were non-families. 12.50% of all households were made up of individuals, and 8.60% had someone living alone who was 65 years of age or older. The average household size was 2.74 and the average family size was 2.95.

The township's age distribution consisted of 34.5% under the age of 18, 2.3% from 18 to 24, 30.3% from 25 to 44, 13.7% from 45 to 64, and 19.2% who were 65 years of age or older. The median age was 27.8 years. For every 100 females, there were 96.9 males. For every 100 females age 18 and over, there were 108.2 males.

The median income for a household in the township was $44,375, and the median income for a family was $45,160. Males had a median income of $24,132 versus $21,161 for females. The per capita income for the township was $16,847. About 30.5% of families and 29.2% of the population were below the poverty line, including 31.7% of those under age 18 and 8.2% of those age 65 or over.

Historical population
Census	Pop.	Note	%±
2010	644		—
2020	569		−11.6%
U.S. Decennial Census

== School districts ==
- Effingham Community Unit School District 40
- North Clay Community Unit School District 25
- South Central Community Unit School District 401

== Political districts ==
- Illinois' 19th congressional district
- State House District 108
- State Senate District 54
