= Kinmundy Township, Marion County, Illinois =

Kinmundy Township
- Township

- Location of Illinois in the United States
- Coordinates: 38°47′N 88°52′W
- Country: United States
- State: Illinois
- County: Marion
- Settled: November 4, 1873

Area
  - Total: 36.98 sq mi (95.8 km^{2})
  - Land: 36.65 sq mi (94.9 km^{2})
  - Water: 0.33 sq mi (0.85 km^{2})
- Elevation: 584 ft (178 m)

Population (2010)
  - Estimate (2016): 1,151
  - Density: 32.4/sq mi (12.5/km^{2})
- Time zone: UTC-6 (CST)
  - Summer (DST): UTC-5 (CDT)
- FIPS code: 17-121-40130

Kinmundy Township is located in Marion County, Illinois, USA. At the 2010 census, its population was 1,186 and it contained 542 housing units.

Kinmundy is believed to be named after a place in Scotland.

== Geography ==
Kinmundy Township (T4N R3E) is centered at 38°47'N 88°51'W (38.778, -88.983). It is traversed northeast–southwest by Interstate Route 57, State Route 37 and the East Fork of the Kaskaskia River. The city of Kinmundy is located near the center of the township. According to the 2010 census, the township has a total area of 36.98 square miles (95.8 km^{2}), of which 36.65 square miles (94.9 km^{2}) (or 99.11%) is land and 0.33 square miles (0.85 km^{2}) (or 0.89%) is water.

== Demographics ==
Historical population
Census	Pop.	Note	%±
2016 (est.)	1,151
U.S. Decennial Census

== Adjacent townships ==
- Lone Grove Township, Fayette County (north)
- LaClede Township, Fayette County (northeast)
- Meacham Township (east)
- Omega Township (southeast)
- Alma Township (south)
- Tonti Township (southwest)
- Foster Township (west)
- Wilberton Township, Fayette County (northwest)
