= Clay County, Illinois =

County in Illinois, United States

- County
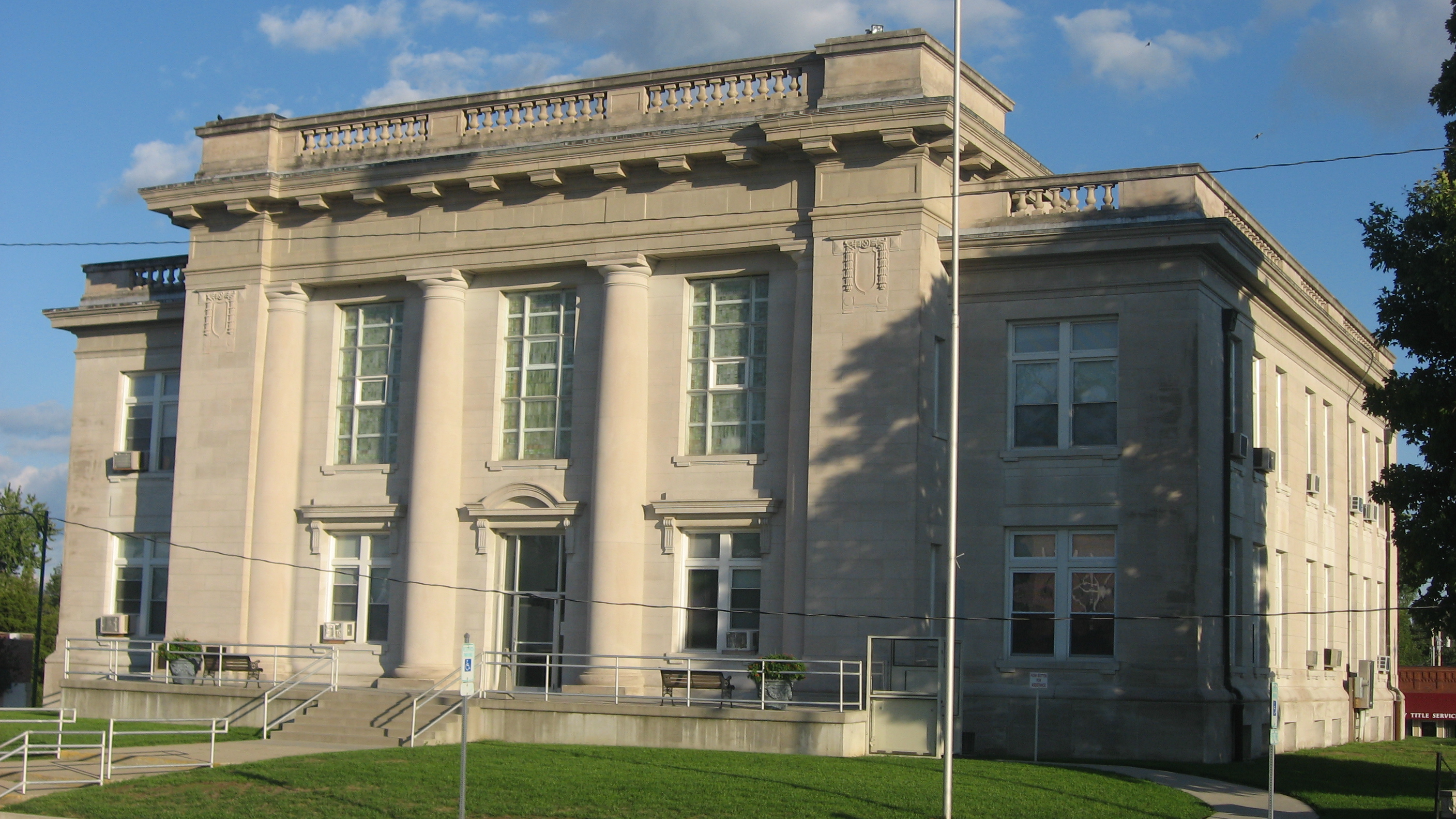
- Clay County Courthouse in Louisville

- Location within the U.S. state of Illinois
- Coordinates: 38°46′N 88°29′W
- Country: United States
- State: Illinois
- Created: December 23, 1824
- Organized: March 8, 1825
- Named for: Henry Clay
- Seat: Louisville
- Largest city: Flora

Area
  - Total: 469.59 sq mi (1,216.2 km^{2})
  - Land: 468.32 sq mi (1,212.9 km^{2})
  - Water: 1.28 sq mi (3.3 km^{2}) 0.3%

Population (2020)
  - Total: 13,288
  - Estimate (2025): 12,793 ▼
  - Density: 28.374/sq mi (10.955/km^{2})
- Time zone: UTC−6 (Central)
  - Summer (DST): UTC−5 (CDT)
- Congressional district: 12th
- Website: claycounty.illinois.gov

Clay County is a county in the southeastern portion of the U.S. state of Illinois. As of the 2020 United States census, the population was 13,288. Since 1842, its county seat has been Louisville, in the center of the county's area. In 1950, the U.S. Census Bureau placed the mean center of U.S. population in Clay County.

== History ==
The future Clay County had been inhabited for thousands of years by the Illiniwek Indians (the remains of an Indian village's burial ground are still visible west of Ingraham). White explorers used or cleared a trail between the future settlements of Saint Louis in Missouri, to Vincennes in Indiana; this became a mail route in 1805. The first white settler (McCauley, from Kentucky) built a cabin in 1809 near this road at its intersection with a trail from Vandalia to Mt. Carmel. He was driven out by the Indians, but had returned by 1819, by which time other cabins had been constructed in the area, which was originally called Habbardsville. The Indians were removed from the area in 1828.

Clay County was authorized by act of the state legislature on December 23, 1824, by partitioning portions of Wayne, Crawford, and Fayette counties. It was named for American statesman Henry Clay, a member of the United States Senate from Kentucky and United States Secretary of State. Clay was a candidate for president in 1824.

The first appointed commissioners met on March 8, 1825, to organize the county government. Land for county building purposes was donated near Habbardsville. The commissioners accepted the offer, renamed it Maysville, and had a two-room courthouse erected on the property by the end of the year. The seat remained at that location (about a mile south of the present community of Clay City) through 1841, and in 1842 the county government began functioning in Louisville, being at the center of the county's area.

The first railroad line through Clay County was laid between 1850 and 1854, the Ohio and Mississippi Line. By 1855–56, the Illinois Central Railroad had also been constructed across the northwest corner of the county.

== Geography ==
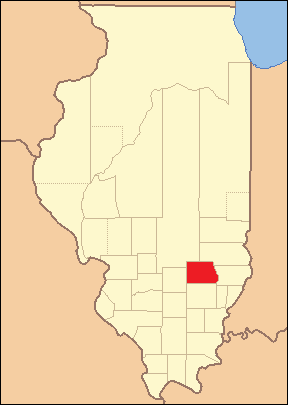
Clay County from the time of its creation to 1831

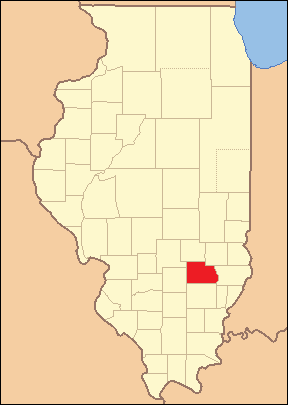
Clay County between 1831 and 1841

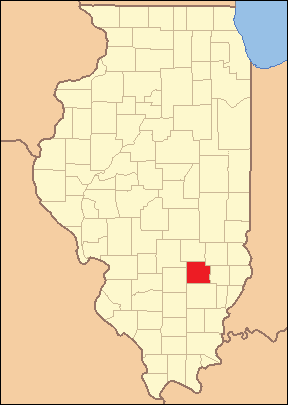
Clay County was reduced to its current size in 1841 by the creation of Richland County.

The low rolling hills of Clay County are devoted to agricultural production. The various drainage areas are still largely wooded. The Little Wabash River flows southeastward through the center of the county, while Muddy Creek drains the eastern portion (the meanders of Little Muddy delineate a portion of the county's east border with Richland County). Buck Creek, in the south part of the county, flows eastward and joins the Little Wabash above Clay City. Raccoon Creek flows southeastward from the lower part of the county into Wayne County. The highest point on the terrain (646 feet/197 meters ASL) is a small point along the western border with Marion County.

The county produced excellent timber during the nineteenth century, and some sandstone and limestone. The soil is light and not considered adapted to farming on a large scale.

According to the U.S. Census Bureau, the county has a total area of 470 square miles (1,200 km^{2}), of which 468 square miles (1,210 km^{2}) is land and 1.3 square miles (3.4 km^{2}) (0.3%) is water.

=== Adjacent counties ===
- Effingham County - north
- Jasper County - northeast
- Richland County - east
- Wayne County - south
- Marion County - west
- Fayette County - northwest

=== Major highways ===
- I-57
- US 45
- US 50
- IL 37

=== Protected areas ===
- Martin T Snyder Memorial Nature Preserve

== Communities ==
=== Cities ===
- Flora

=== Villages ===
- Clay City
- Iola
- Louisville (seat)
- Sailor Springs
- Xenia

=== Unincorporated communities ===
- Bible Grove
- Camp Travis
- Greendale
- Hoosier
- Hord
- Ingraham
- Kenner
- Oskaloosa
- Riffle
- Wendelin

=== Townships ===
- Bible Grove
- Blair
- Clay City
- Harter
- Hoosier
- Larkinsburg
- Louisville
- Oskaloosa
- Pixley
- Songer
- Stanford
- Xenia

== Climate and weather ==
Louisville, Illinois

Climate chart (precipitation, max. and min. temperature)
| J | F | M | A | M | J | J | A | S | O | N | D |
| 2.7 38 21 | 2.5 44 25 | 4 55 34 | 4.1 67 43 | 4.3 76 53 | 4.3 85 62 | 3.9 89 65 | 3.3 87 63 | 3.2 80 56 | 3 69 45 | 4.1 55 35 | 3.4 43 25 |
- █ Average max. and min. temperatures in °F
- █ Precipitation totals in inches
- Source: The Weather Channel
Metric conversion
| J | F | M | A | M | J | J | A | S | O | N | D |
| 70 3 −6 | 63 7 −4 | 102 13 1 | 105 19 6 | 109 24 12 | 110 29 17 | 99 32 18 | 85 31 17 | 81 27 13 | 77 21 7 | 104 13 2 | 85 6 −4 |
- █ Average max. and min. temperatures in °C
- █ Precipitation totals in mm

In recent years, average temperatures in the county seat of Louisville have ranged from a low of 21 °F (−6 °C) in January to a high of 89 °F (32 °C) in July, although a record low of −25 °F (−32 °C) was recorded in January 1904 and a record high of 111 °F (44 °C) was recorded in July 1936. Average monthly precipitation ranged from 2.49 inches (63 mm) in February to 4.34 inches (110 mm) in June.

== Demographics ==
Historical population
| Census | Pop. | Note | %± |
|---|---|---|---|
| 1830 | 755 | | — |
| 1840 | 3,228 | | 327.5% |
| 1850 | 4,289 | | 32.9% |
| 1860 | 9,336 | | 117.7% |
| 1870 | 15,875 | | 70.0% |
| 1880 | 16,192 | | 2.0% |
| 1890 | 16,772 | | 3.6% |
| 1900 | 19,553 | | 16.6% |
| 1910 | 18,661 | | −4.6% |
| 1920 | 17,684 | | −5.2% |
| 1930 | 16,155 | | −8.6% |
| 1940 | 18,947 | | 17.3% |
| 1950 | 17,445 | | −7.9% |
| 1960 | 15,815 | | −9.3% |
| 1970 | 14,735 | | −6.8% |
| 1980 | 15,283 | | 3.7% |
| 1990 | 14,460 | | −5.4% |
| 2000 | 14,560 | | 0.7% |
| 2010 | 13,815 | | −5.1% |
| 2020 | 13,288 | | −3.8% |
| 2025 (est.) | 12,793 | ▼ | −3.7% |
US Decennial Census; 1790-1960 1900-1990; 1990-2000 2010

2000 census age pyramid for Clay County

=== 2020 census ===
As of the 2020 census, the county had a population of 13,288. The median age was 42.9 years, 22.9% of residents were under the age of 18, and 21.2% of residents were 65 years of age or older. For every 100 females there were 97.0 males, and for every 100 females age 18 and over there were 95.6 males age 18 and over.

The racial makeup of the county was 94.3% White, 0.3% Black or African American, 0.3% American Indian and Alaska Native, 0.6% Asian, <0.1% Native Hawaiian and Pacific Islander, 0.7% from some other race, and 3.8% from two or more races. Hispanic or Latino residents of any race comprised 1.7% of the population.

36.1% of residents lived in urban areas, while 63.9% lived in rural areas.

There were 5,506 households in the county, of which 28.8% had children under the age of 18 living in them. Of all households, 49.8% were married-couple households, 18.5% were households with a male householder and no spouse or partner present, and 25.0% were households with a female householder and no spouse or partner present. About 30.6% of all households were made up of individuals and 14.5% had someone living alone who was 65 years of age or older.

There were 6,145 housing units, of which 10.4% were vacant. Among occupied housing units, 78.2% were owner-occupied and 21.8% were renter-occupied. The homeowner vacancy rate was 2.0% and the rental vacancy rate was 7.0%.

=== Racial and ethnic composition ===
Clay County, Illinois – Racial and ethnic composition Note: the US Census treats Hispanic/Latino as an ethnic category. This table excludes Latinos from the racial categories and assigns them to a separate category. Hispanics/Latinos may be of any race.
| Race / Ethnicity (NH = Non-Hispanic) | Pop 1980 | Pop 1990 | Pop 2000 | Pop 2010 | Pop 2020 | % 1980 | % 1990 | % 2000 | % 2010 | % 2020 |
|---|---|---|---|---|---|---|---|---|---|---|
| White alone (NH) | 15,189 | 14,353 | 14,297 | 13,429 | 12,481 | 99.38% | 99.26% | 98.19% | 97.21% | 93.93% |
| Black or African American alone (NH) | 0 | 4 | 16 | 43 | 30 | 0.00% | 0.03% | 0.11% | 0.31% | 0.23% |
| Native American or Alaska Native alone (NH) | 22 | 17 | 27 | 30 | 33 | 0.14% | 0.12% | 0.19% | 0.22% | 0.25% |
| Asian alone (NH) | 15 | 28 | 76 | 63 | 77 | 0.10% | 0.19% | 0.52% | 0.46% | 0.58% |
| Native Hawaiian or Pacific Islander alone (NH) | x | x | 2 | 0 | 0 | x | x | 0.01% | 0.00% | 0.00% |
| Other race alone (NH) | 10 | 1 | 0 | 0 | 18 | 0.07% | 0.01% | 0.00% | 0.00% | 0.14% |
| Mixed race or Multiracial (NH) | x | x | 54 | 99 | 426 | x | x | 0.37% | 0.72% | 3.21% |
| Hispanic or Latino (any race) | 47 | 57 | 88 | 151 | 223 | 0.31% | 0.39% | 0.60% | 1.09% | 1.68% |
| Total | 15,283 | 14,460 | 14,560 | 13,815 | 13,288 | 100.00% | 100.00% | 100.00% | 100.00% | 100.00% |

=== 2010 census ===
As of the 2010 United States census, there were 13,815 people, 5,697 households, and 3,790 families in the county. The population density was 29.5 inhabitants per square mile (11.4/km^{2}). There were 6,404 housing units at an average density of 13.7 per square mile (5.3/km^{2}). The racial makeup of the county was 97.7% white, 0.5% Asian, 0.3% black or African American, 0.2% American Indian, 0.5% from other races, and 0.8% from two or more races. Those of Hispanic or Latino origin made up 1.1% of the population. In terms of ancestry, 21.7% were German, 14.6% were American, 12.6% were Irish, and 8.6% were English.

Of the 5,697 households, 29.5% had children under the age of 18 living with them, 52.1% were married couples living together, 9.4% had a female householder with no husband present, 33.5% were non-families, and 28.9% of all households were made up of individuals. The average household size was 2.37 and the average family size was 2.89. The median age was 42.2 years.

The median income for a household in the county was $38,016 and the median income for a family was $48,659. Males had a median income of $38,191 versus $27,347 for females. The per capita income for the county was $20,802. About 11.2% of families and 16.3% of the population were below the poverty line, including 21.4% of those under age 18 and 14.7% of those age 65 or over.

== Education ==
- Clay City Community Unit District 10
- Dieterich Community Unit School District 30
- Effingham Community Unit School District 40
- Flora Community Unit School District 35
- Jasper County Community Unit School District 1
- North Clay Community Unit School District 25
  - North Clay High School
- South Central Community Unit School District 401

== Politics ==
As part of Upland Southern-settled Southern Illinois, Clay County is powerfully Republican. No Democratic presidential nominee has won a majority in Clay County since Lyndon Johnson’s 1964 landslide, and typically for the region recent presidential elections have seen dramatic declines in Democratic support.

United States presidential election results for Clay County, Illinois
| Year | Republican | | Democratic | | Third party(ies) | |
| Year | No. | % | No. | % | No. | % |
|---|---|---|---|---|---|---|
| 1892 | 1,774 | 45.64% | 1,604 | 41.27% | 509 | 13.09% |
| 1896 | 2,155 | 47.89% | 2,272 | 50.49% | 73 | 1.62% |
| 1900 | 2,356 | 49.45% | 2,295 | 48.17% | 113 | 2.37% |
| 1904 | 2,408 | 53.19% | 1,935 | 42.74% | 184 | 4.06% |
| 1908 | 2,250 | 49.53% | 2,152 | 47.37% | 141 | 3.10% |
| 1912 | 1,622 | 37.36% | 1,926 | 44.37% | 793 | 18.27% |
| 1916 | 3,879 | 50.43% | 3,574 | 46.46% | 239 | 3.11% |
| 1920 | 3,683 | 59.90% | 2,358 | 38.35% | 108 | 1.76% |
| 1924 | 3,432 | 49.60% | 2,987 | 43.17% | 500 | 7.23% |
| 1928 | 4,522 | 65.16% | 2,418 | 34.84% | 0 | 0.00% |
| 1932 | 3,373 | 41.83% | 4,565 | 56.61% | 126 | 1.56% |
| 1936 | 4,528 | 48.25% | 4,752 | 50.64% | 104 | 1.11% |
| 1940 | 5,185 | 50.72% | 4,934 | 48.27% | 103 | 1.01% |
| 1944 | 4,484 | 55.29% | 3,531 | 43.54% | 95 | 1.17% |
| 1948 | 3,782 | 53.21% | 3,160 | 44.46% | 166 | 2.34% |
| 1952 | 5,254 | 60.38% | 3,432 | 39.44% | 15 | 0.17% |
| 1956 | 5,079 | 58.73% | 3,553 | 41.08% | 16 | 0.19% |
| 1960 | 5,134 | 60.13% | 3,394 | 39.75% | 10 | 0.12% |
| 1964 | 3,665 | 44.61% | 4,551 | 55.39% | 0 | 0.00% |
| 1968 | 4,429 | 55.46% | 2,878 | 36.04% | 679 | 8.50% |
| 1972 | 5,283 | 64.92% | 2,844 | 34.95% | 11 | 0.14% |
| 1976 | 3,860 | 49.94% | 3,837 | 49.64% | 32 | 0.41% |
| 1980 | 4,447 | 61.20% | 2,587 | 35.60% | 232 | 3.19% |
| 1984 | 4,562 | 64.22% | 2,524 | 35.53% | 18 | 0.25% |
| 1988 | 3,494 | 55.65% | 2,761 | 43.97% | 24 | 0.38% |
| 1992 | 2,471 | 37.15% | 2,962 | 44.53% | 1,219 | 18.33% |
| 1996 | 2,703 | 43.40% | 2,750 | 44.16% | 775 | 12.44% |
| 2000 | 3,789 | 61.76% | 2,212 | 36.06% | 134 | 2.18% |
| 2004 | 4,416 | 67.38% | 2,101 | 32.06% | 37 | 0.56% |
| 2008 | 3,926 | 60.72% | 2,425 | 37.50% | 115 | 1.78% |
| 2012 | 4,190 | 70.92% | 1,584 | 26.81% | 134 | 2.27% |
| 2016 | 5,021 | 79.07% | 1,020 | 16.06% | 309 | 4.87% |
| 2020 | 5,629 | 81.59% | 1,129 | 16.36% | 141 | 2.04% |
| 2024 | 5,610 | 82.77% | 1,054 | 15.55% | 114 | 1.68% |

== See also ==
- National Register of Historic Places listings in Clay County, Illinois
