= Wendelin, Illinois =

- Unincorporated community
- Location within Illinois Location within the United States
- Coordinates: 38°50′00″N 88°16′22″W
- Country: United States
- State: Illinois
- County: Clay
- Elevation: 476 ft (145 m)
- Time zone: UTC-6 (Central (CST))
  - Summer (DST): UTC-5 (CDT)
- Area code: 618
- GNIS feature ID: 420746

Wendelin is an unincorporated community in Clay County, Illinois, United States. Wendelin is northeast of Sailor Springs. Wendelin is home of Holy Cross Catholic Church, and Vic's Tavern.
