= Jasper County, Illinois =

County in Illinois, United States

- County
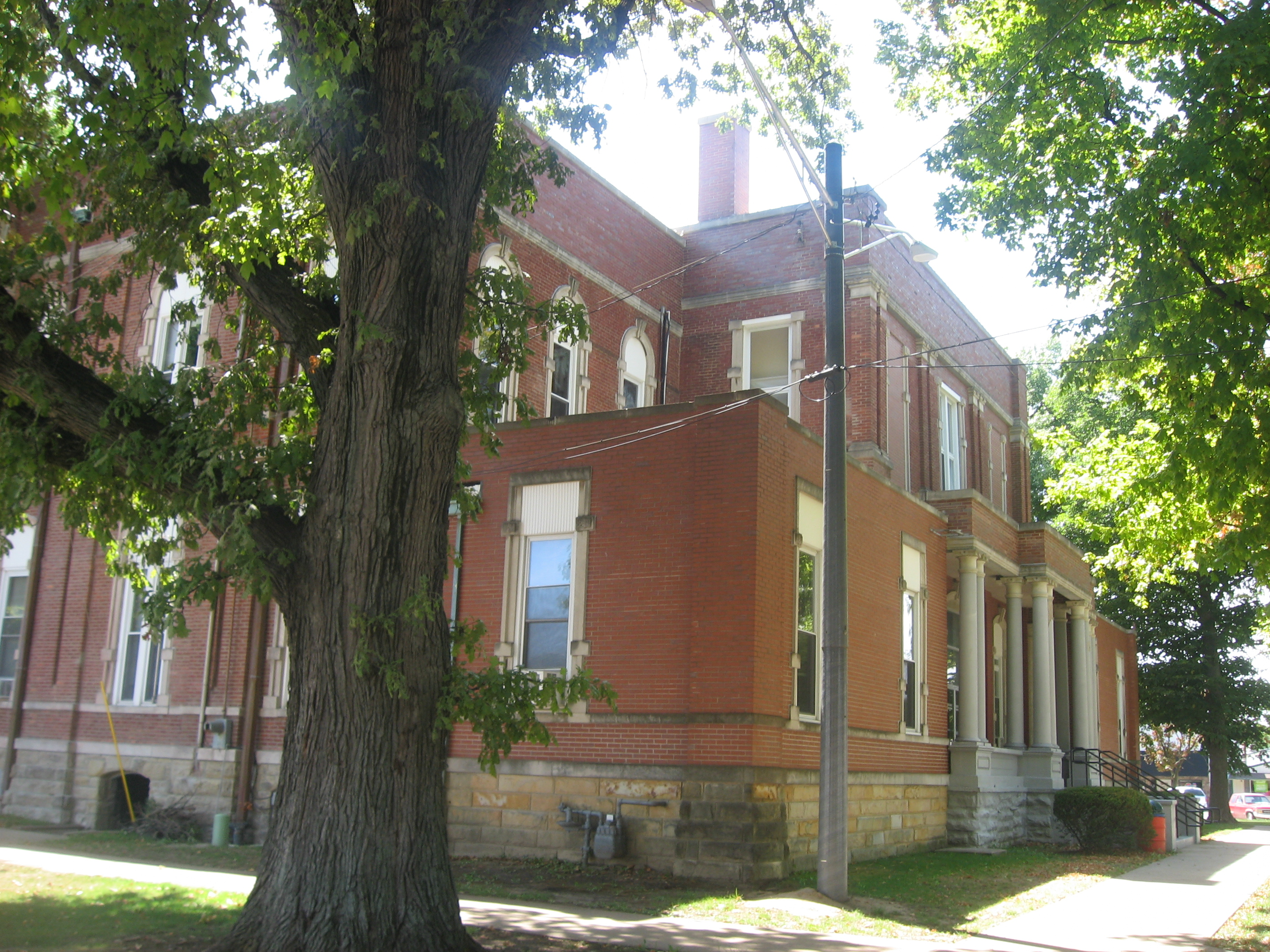
- Jasper County Courthouse in Newton

- Flag

- Location within the U.S. state of Illinois
- Coordinates: 39°01′N 88°09′W
- Country: United States
- State: Illinois
- Founded: 1831
- Named for: William Jasper
- Seat: Newton
- Largest city: Newton

Area
  - Total: 498 sq mi (1,290 km^{2})
  - Land: 495 sq mi (1,280 km^{2})
  - Water: 3.6 sq mi (9.3 km^{2}) 0.7%

Population (2020)
  - Total: 9,287
  - Estimate (2025): 9,032 ▼
  - Density: 18.8/sq mi (7.24/km^{2})
- Time zone: UTC−6 (Central)
  - Summer (DST): UTC−5 (CDT)
- Congressional district: 12th
- Website: https://jaspercountyillinois.gov/

Jasper County is a county located in the U.S. state of Illinois. According to the 2020 census, it has a population of 9,287. Its county seat is Newton.

== History ==
Jasper County was formed in 1831 out of Clay and Crawford Counties. It was named for Sgt. William Jasper, a Revolutionary War hero from South Carolina. During the defense of Fort Moultrie in 1776, the staff of the American flag was shot away. Sgt. Jasper attached the flag to a pole and stood on the wall waving the flag at the British until a new staff was erected.

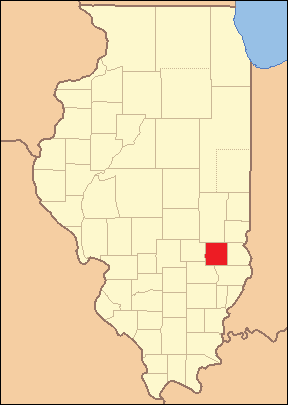
Jasper County at the time of its creation in 1831

== Geography ==
According to the U.S. Census Bureau, the county has a total area of 498 square miles (1,290 km^{2}), of which 495 square miles (1,280 km^{2}) is land and 3.6 square miles (9.3 km^{2}) (0.7%) is water.

=== Climate and weather ===
Newton, Illinois

Climate chart (precipitation, max. and min. temperature)
J	F	M	A	M	J	J	A	S	O	N	D
2.4 34 18	2.4 40 23	3.9 51 33	3.9 63 42	4.4 73 52	3.7 82 62	4.4 85 66	3.4 84 63	3.2 78 55	2.8 66 43	4 52 34	2.9 39 24
- █ Average max. and min. temperatures in °F
- █ Precipitation totals in inches
- Source: The Weather Channel
Metric conversion
J	F	M	A	M	J	J	A	S	O	N	D
60 1 −8	60 4 −5	98 11 1	99 17 6	112 23 11	95 28 17	111 29 19	87 29 17	81 26 13	70 19 6	101 11 1	74 4 −4
- █ Average max. and min. temperatures in °C
- █ Precipitation totals in mm

In recent years, average temperatures in the county seat of Newton have ranged from a low of 18 °F (−8 °C) in January to a high of 85 °F (29 °C) in July, although a record low of −28 °F (−33 °C) was recorded in January 1994 and a record high of 112 °F (44 °C) was recorded in July 1954. Average monthly precipitation ranged from 2.38 inches (60 mm) in January to 4.39 inches (112 mm) in May.

=== Adjacent counties ===
- Cumberland County – north
- Clark County – northeast
- Crawford County – east
- Richland County – south
- Clay County – southwest
- Effingham County – west

=== Major highways ===
- Illinois Route 33
- Illinois Route 49
- Illinois Route 130

== Demographics ==
Historical population
Census	Pop.	Note	%±
1840	1,472		—
1850	3,220		118.8%
1860	8,364		159.8%
1870	11,234		34.3%
1880	14,515		29.2%
1890	18,188		25.3%
1900	20,160		10.8%
1910	18,157		−9.9%
1920	16,064		−11.5%
1930	12,809		−20.3%
1940	13,431		4.9%
1950	12,266		−8.7%
1960	11,346		−7.5%
1970	10,741		−5.3%
1980	11,318		5.4%
1990	10,609		−6.3%
2000	10,117		−4.6%
2010	9,698		−4.1%
2020	9,287		−4.2%
2025 (est.)	9,032	▼	−2.7%
U.S. Decennial Census; 1790–1960 1900–1990; 1990–2000 2010

2000 census age pyramid for Jasper County

=== 2020 census ===
As of the 2020 census, the county had a population of 9,287. The median age was 44.1 years. 22.4% of residents were under the age of 18 and 21.4% of residents were 65 years of age or older. For every 100 females there were 102.2 males, and for every 100 females age 18 and over there were 99.6 males age 18 and over.

The racial makeup of the county was 96.6% White, 0.2% Black or African American, 0.2% American Indian and Alaska Native, 0.2% Asian, <0.1% Native Hawaiian and Pacific Islander, 0.4% from some other race, and 2.3% from two or more races. Hispanic or Latino residents of any race comprised 0.9% of the population.

<0.1% of residents lived in urban areas, while 100.0% lived in rural areas.

There were 3,801 households in the county, of which 28.5% had children under the age of 18 living in them. Of all households, 56.3% were married-couple households, 17.5% were households with a male householder and no spouse or partner present, and 20.9% were households with a female householder and no spouse or partner present. About 27.8% of all households were made up of individuals and 14.0% had someone living alone who was 65 years of age or older.

There were 4,228 housing units, of which 10.1% were vacant. Among occupied housing units, 83.8% were owner-occupied and 16.2% were renter-occupied. The homeowner vacancy rate was 1.7% and the rental vacancy rate was 9.0%.

=== Racial and ethnic composition ===
Jasper County County, Illinois – Racial and ethnic composition Note: the US Census treats Hispanic/Latino as an ethnic category. This table excludes Latinos from the racial categories and assigns them to a separate category. Hispanics/Latinos may be of any race.
Race / Ethnicity (NH = Non-Hispanic)	Pop 1980	Pop 1990	Pop 2000	Pop 2010	Pop 2020	% 1980	% 1990	% 2000	% 2010	% 2020
White alone (NH)	11,259	10,548	10,003	9,517	8,934	99.48%	99.43%	98.87%	98.13%	96.20%
Black or African American alone (NH)	2	1	8	10	22	0.02%	0.01%	0.08%	0.10%	0.24%
Native American or Alaska Native alone (NH)	8	11	6	12	19	0.07%	0.10%	0.06%	0.12%	0.20%
Asian alone (NH)	13	16	19	24	15	0.11%	0.15%	0.19%	0.25%	0.16%
Native Hawaiian or Pacific Islander alone (NH)	x	x	1	2	4	x	x	0.01%	0.02%	0.04%
Other race alone (NH)	1	1	5	1	19	0.01%	0.01%	0.05%	0.01%	0.20%
Mixed race or Multiracial (NH)	x	x	27	53	190	x	x	0.27%	0.55%	2.05%
Hispanic or Latino (any race)	35	32	48	79	84	0.31%	0.30%	0.47%	0.81%	0.90%
Total	11,318	10,609	10,117	9,698	9,287	100.00%	100.00%	100.00%	100.00%	100.00%

=== 2010 census ===
As of the 2010 United States census, there were 9,698 people, 3,940 households, and 2,800 families living in the county. The population density was 19.6 inhabitants per square mile (7.6/km^{2}). There were 4,345 housing units at an average density of 8.8 per square mile (3.4/km^{2}). The racial makeup of the county was 98.6% white, 0.2% Asian, 0.1% American Indian, 0.1% black or African American, 0.3% from other races, and 0.6% from two or more races. Those of Hispanic or Latino origin made up 0.8% of the population. In terms of ancestry, 39.5% were German, 12.5% were American, 11.0% were Irish, and 9.1% were English.

Of the 3,940 households, 29.7% had children under the age of 18 living with them, 59.1% were married couples living together, 7.9% had a female householder with no husband present, 28.9% were non-families, and 24.5% of all households were made up of individuals. The average household size was 2.45 and the average family size was 2.90. The median age was 42.7 years.

The median income for a household in the county was $46,546 and the median income for a family was $53,034. Males had a median income of $39,167 versus $24,856 for females. The per capita income for the county was $21,467. About 6.3% of families and 8.5% of the population were below the poverty line, including 10.6% of those under age 18 and 5.1% of those aged 65 or over.

== Education ==
Jasper County is largely served by Jasper County Community Unit School District 1, which is based in its county seat, Newton. Five of the district's six schools are located in Jasper County. Saint Thomas Catholic School is a private elementary school, also in Newton.

== Communities ==
=== City ===
- Newton (seat)

=== Villages ===
- Hidalgo
- Rose Hill
- Ste. Marie
- Wheeler
- Willow Hill
- Yale

=== Census-designated place ===
- West Liberty

=== Unincorporated communities ===
- Advance
- Bogota
- Boos
- Brookville
- Falmouth
- Gila
- Hunt City
- Island Grove
- Latona
- Lis
- Plainfield
- Point Pleasant
- Rafetown
- Shamrock

=== Townships ===
Jasper County is divided into eleven townships:

- Crooked Creek
- Fox
- Grandville
- Grove
- Hunt City
- North Muddy
- Sainte Marie
- Smallwood
- South Muddy
- Wade
- Willow Hill

== Notable residents ==
- Glenn Brummer, baseball catcher for the Major League Baseball St. Louis Cardinals and Texas Rangers; member of the 1982 World Champion Cardinals
- Irene Hunt, author of the classic Across Five Aprils
- Albert Isley, Illinois judge, lawyer, and state senator
- Burl Ives, folk singer, author, and actor
- Ross Wolf, baseball pitcher; plays for the SK Wyverns of the Korea Baseball Championship; formerly played for several Major League Baseball teams

== Politics ==
Jasper is politically a fairly typical "anti-Yankee" Southern Illinois county. Opposition to the "Yankee" Republican Party and that party's Civil War meant that Jasper County voted solidly Democratic until isolationist sentiment drove its voters to Warren G. Harding in 1920.

Since the New Deal, the county has shown a steady trend away from the Democratic Party due to major shifts in that party's views – initially on economic policies and since the 1990s on social issues. Only one Democrat, Lyndon Johnson, has won a majority since 1940 in his 1964 landslide. It appears to be a statistical change in the Upland South, that Barack Obama in 2012 and Hillary Clinton in 2016 did not fare as well as previous Democratic candidates for president.

United States presidential election results for Jasper County, Illinois
Year	Republican		Democratic		Third party(ies)	
Year	No.	%	No.	%	No.	%
1892	1,519	36.74%	2,217	53.62%	399	9.65%
1896	1,867	40.12%	2,724	58.54%	62	1.33%
1900	1,923	41.57%	2,591	56.01%	112	2.42%
1904	1,889	45.20%	2,024	48.43%	266	6.37%
1908	1,860	43.01%	2,317	53.57%	148	3.42%
1912	1,227	31.11%	2,042	51.77%	675	17.11%
1916	3,110	43.36%	3,884	54.15%	179	2.50%
1920	3,279	51.63%	2,971	46.78%	101	1.59%
1924	3,030	47.37%	3,144	49.15%	223	3.49%
1928	3,201	51.04%	3,055	48.71%	16	0.26%
1932	2,300	34.20%	4,390	65.27%	36	0.54%
1936	3,221	42.94%	4,149	55.31%	132	1.76%
1940	4,082	52.23%	3,689	47.20%	44	0.56%
1944	3,453	52.13%	3,142	47.43%	29	0.44%
1948	2,957	49.76%	2,936	49.40%	50	0.84%
1952	3,753	57.82%	2,728	42.03%	10	0.15%
1956	3,107	51.77%	2,895	48.23%	0	0.00%
1960	3,393	52.84%	3,027	47.14%	1	0.02%
1964	2,614	43.42%	3,406	56.58%	0	0.00%
1968	2,944	51.78%	2,012	35.39%	730	12.84%
1972	3,461	61.18%	2,114	37.37%	82	1.45%
1976	2,794	49.45%	2,772	49.06%	84	1.49%
1980	3,548	63.22%	1,846	32.89%	218	3.88%
1984	3,673	67.35%	1,750	32.09%	31	0.57%
1988	3,024	58.28%	2,135	41.14%	30	0.58%
1992	1,996	36.42%	2,284	41.68%	1,200	21.90%
1996	2,234	45.12%	2,038	41.16%	679	13.71%
2000	3,119	62.12%	1,815	36.15%	87	1.73%
2004	3,529	66.14%	1,781	33.38%	26	0.49%
2008	2,964	57.64%	2,063	40.12%	115	2.24%
2012	3,514	69.68%	1,436	28.48%	93	1.84%
2016	3,975	77.76%	924	18.08%	213	4.17%
2020	4,494	80.45%	1,007	18.03%	85	1.52%
2024	4,449	81.81%	912	16.77%	77	1.42%

== See also ==
- National Register of Historic Places listings in Jasper County, Illinois
