= Bogota, Illinois =

- Unincorporated community
- Location within Illinois Location within the United States
- Coordinates: 38°55′06″N 88°14′24″W
- Country: United States
- State: Illinois
- County: Jasper
- Township: Smallwood
- Elevation: 541 ft (165 m)
- Time zone: UTC-6 (CST)
  - Summer (DST): UTC-5 (CDT)
- ZIP code: 62448
- GNIS feature ID: 0404648

Bogota is an unincorporated community in Smallwood Township, Jasper County, Illinois, United States.
