= Latona, Illinois =

- Unincorporated community
- Location within Illinois Location within the United States
- Coordinates: 38°58′50″N 88°18′42″W
- Country: United States
- State: Illinois
- County: Jasper
- Elevation: 551 ft (168 m)
- Time zone: UTC-6 (Central (CST))
  - Summer (DST): UTC-5 (CDT)
- Area code: 618
- GNIS feature ID: 422899

Latona is an unincorporated community in Jasper County, in the U.S. state of Illinois.

== History ==
Latona was laid out in 1869. A post office was established at Latona in 1877, and remained in operation until 1920.
