= Wheeler, Illinois =

- Village
- Location of Wheeler in Jasper County, Illinois
- Coordinates: 39°02′35″N 88°19′08″W
- Country: United States
- State: Illinois
- County: Jasper
- Township: North Muddy

Area
  - Total: 0.58 sq mi (1.49 km^{2})
  - Land: 0.58 sq mi (1.49 km^{2})
  - Water: 0 sq mi (0.00 km^{2})
- Elevation: 577 ft (176 m)

Population (2020)
  - Total: 96
  - Density: 166.7/sq mi (64.37/km^{2})
- Time zone: UTC-6 (CST)
  - Summer (DST): UTC-5 (CDT)
- ZIP code: 62479
- Area code: 618
- FIPS code: 17–81074
- GNIS feature ID: 2400160

Wheeler is a village in Jasper County, Illinois, United States. The population was 96 at the 2020 census.

== Geography ==
Wheeler is located in western Jasper County. Illinois Route 33 passes through the north side of the village, leading southeast 9 miles (14 km) to Newton, the county seat, and northwest 14 miles (23 km) to Effingham.

According to the 2021 census gazetteer files, Wheeler has a total area of 0.58 square miles (1.50 km^{2}), all land.

== Demographics ==
Historical population
Census	Pop.	Note	%±
1900	206		—
1910	255		23.8%
1920	214		−16.1%
1930	189		−11.7%
1940	174		−7.9%
1950	178		2.3%
1960	173		−2.8%
1970	173		0.0%
1980	166		−4.0%
1990	161		−3.0%
2000	119		−26.1%
2010	147		23.5%
2020	96		−34.7%
U.S. Decennial Census

As of the 2020 census there were 96 people, 60 households, and 41 families residing in the village. The population density was 166.67 inhabitants per square mile (64.35/km^{2}). There were 50 housing units at an average density of 86.81 per square mile (33.52/km^{2}). The racial makeup of the village was 98.96% White, 0.00% African American, 0.00% Native American, 0.00% Asian, 0.00% Pacific Islander, 1.04% from other races, and 0.00% from two or more races. Hispanic or Latino of any race were 1.04% of the population.

There were 60 households, out of which 48.3% had children under the age of 18 living with them, 50.00% were married couples living together, 18.33% had a female householder with no husband present, and 31.67% were non-families. 30.00% of all households were made up of individuals, and 13.33% had someone living alone who was 65 years of age or older. The average household size was 3.76 and the average family size was 2.97.

The village's age distribution consisted of 41.0% under the age of 18, 4.5% from 18 to 24, 27% from 25 to 44, 20.7% from 45 to 64, and 6.7% who were 65 years of age or older. The median age was 32.3 years. For every 100 females, there were 100.0 males. For every 100 females age 18 and over, there were 94.4 males.

The median income for a household in the village was $35,625, and the median income for a family was $36,964. Males had a median income of $34,583 versus $14,750 for females. The per capita income for the village was $15,536. About 26.8% of families and 25.8% of the population were below the poverty line, including 37.0% of those under age 18 and 25.0% of those age 65 or over.
