= Riffle, Illinois =

- Unincorporated community
- Location within Illinois Location within the United States
- Coordinates: 38°48′19″N 88°33′51″W
- Country: United States
- State: Illinois
- County: Clay
- Elevation: 502 ft (153 m)
- Time zone: UTC-6 (Central (CST))
  - Summer (DST): UTC-5 (CDT)
- Area code: 618
- GNIS feature ID: 423119

Riffle is an unincorporated community in Clay County, Illinois, United States.
