= Greendale, Illinois =

- Unincorporated community
- Location within Illinois Location within the United States
- Coordinates: 38°37′47″N 88°41′52″W
- Country: United States
- State: Illinois
- Counties: Clay, Marion
- Elevation: 522 ft (159 m)
- Time zone: UTC-6 (Central (CST))
  - Summer (DST): UTC-5 (CDT)
- Area code: 618
- GNIS feature ID: 422755

Greendale is an unincorporated community in Clay and Marion counties, Illinois, United States. Greendale is located on U.S. Route 50 west of Xenia and east of Iuka.
