= Lucas Township, Effingham County, Illinois =

Lucas Township
- Township
- Location in Effingham County

- Effingham County's location in Illinois
- Coordinates: 38°58′N 88°25′W
- Country: United States
- State: Illinois
- County: Effingham
- Established: November 6, 1860

Area
  - Total: 35.49 sq mi (91.9 km^{2})
  - Land: 35.49 sq mi (91.9 km^{2})
  - Water: 0 sq mi (0 km^{2}) 0%
- Elevation: 561 ft (171 m)

Population (2020)
  - Total: 487
  - Density: 13.7/sq mi (5.30/km^{2})
- Time zone: UTC-6 (CST)
  - Summer (DST): UTC-5 (CDT)
- ZIP codes: 62424, 62858
- FIPS code: 17-049-45161

Lucas Township is one of fifteen townships in Effingham County, Illinois, USA. As of the 2020 census, its population was 487 and it contained 170 housing units.

== Geography ==
According to the 2020 census, the township (which corresponds to survey township T6N R7E) has a total area of 35.489 square miles (91.92 km^{2}), all land.

=== Extinct towns ===
- Eberle
- Winterrowd

=== Cemeteries ===
The township contains these five cemeteries: Merry, Morris, Mount Zion, Saint Matthew Lutheran and Scott.

== Demographics ==
Historical population
Census	Pop.	Note	%±
1870	592		—
1880	938		58.4%
1890	980		4.5%
1900	935		−4.6%
1910	862		−7.8%
1920	722		−16.2%
1930	571		−20.9%
1940	595		4.2%
1950	575		−3.4%
1960	502		−12.7%
1970	507		1.0%
1980	517		2.0%
1990	439		−15.1%
2000	480		9.3%
2010	495		3.1%
2020	487		−1.6%
U.S. Decennial Census

As of the 2020 census there were 487 people, 154 households, and 129 families residing in the township. The population density was 13.72 inhabitants per square mile (5.30/km^{2}). There were 170 housing units at an average density of 4.79 per square mile (1.85/km^{2}). The racial makeup of the township was 95.69% White, 0.21% African American, 0.00% Native American, 0.00% Asian, 0.00% Pacific Islander, 0.41% from other races, and 3.70% from two or more races. Hispanic or Latino of any race were 1.64% of the population.

There were 154 households, out of which 46.10% had children under the age of 18 living with them, 66.88% were married couples living together, 2.60% had a female householder with no spouse present, and 16.23% were non-families. 16.20% of all households were made up of individuals, and 9.70% had someone living alone who was 65 years of age or older. The average household size was 3.10 and the average family size was 3.45.

The township's age distribution consisted of 35.4% under the age of 18, 6.3% from 18 to 24, 25.9% from 25 to 44, 25.4% from 45 to 64, and 7.1% who were 65 years of age or older. The median age was 31.5 years. For every 100 females, there were 97.5 males. For every 100 females age 18 and over, there were 113.1 males.

The median income for a household in the township was $67,159, and the median income for a family was $66,989. Males had a median income of $52,500 versus $40,536 for females. The per capita income for the township was $29,424. About 3.1% of families and 1.7% of the population were below the poverty line, including 2.4% of those under age 18 and 0.0% of those age 65 or over.

== School districts ==
- Dieterich Community Unit School District 30
- North Clay Community Unit School District 25

== Political districts ==
- Illinois' 19th congressional district
- State House District 110
- State Senate District 54
