= Xenia Township, Clay County, Illinois =

Xenia Township
- Township
- Location in Clay County

- Clay County's location in Illinois
- Coordinates: 38°38′N 88°38′W
- Country: United States
- State: Illinois
- County: Clay
- Established: November 5, 1861

Area
  - Total: 18.58 sq mi (48.1 km^{2})
  - Land: 18.57 sq mi (48.1 km^{2})
  - Water: 0.01 sq mi (0.026 km^{2}) 0.05%
- Elevation: 541 ft (165 m)

Population (2020)
  - Total: 617
  - Density: 33.2/sq mi (12.8/km^{2})
- Time zone: UTC-6 (CST)
  - Summer (DST): UTC-5 (CDT)
- ZIP codes: 62839, 62899
- FIPS code: 17-025-83752

Xenia Township (/ˈziːniə/ ZEE-nee-ə) is one of twelve townships in Clay County, Illinois, USA. As of the 2020 census, its population was 617 and it contained 303 housing units.

== Geography ==
According to the 2010 census, the township (N½ T2N R5E) has a total area of 18.58 square miles (48.1 km^{2}), of which 18.57 square miles (48.1 km^{2}) (or 99.95%) is land and 0.01 square miles (0.026 km^{2}) (or 0.05%) is water.

=== Cities, towns, villages ===
- Xenia

=== Unincorporated towns ===
- Greendale

(This list is based on USGS data and may include former settlements.)

=== Cemeteries ===
The township contains these four cemeteries: Camp Ground, Independent Order of Oddfellows, Salem and Toliver.

=== Major highways ===
- US Route 50

== Demographics ==
As of the 2020 census there were 617 people, 265 households, and 116 families residing in the township. The population density was 33.12 inhabitants per square mile (12.79/km^{2}). There were 303 housing units at an average density of 16.26 per square mile (6.28/km^{2}). The racial makeup of the township was 93.84% White, 0.16% African American, 0.32% Native American, 0.32% Asian, 0.00% Pacific Islander, 0.32% from other races, and 5.02% from two or more races. Hispanic or Latino of any race were 2.43% of the population.

There were 265 households, out of which 24.50% had children under the age of 18 living with them, 31.32% were married couples living together, 3.40% had a female householder with no spouse present, and 56.23% were non-families. 46.00% of all households were made up of individuals, and 19.20% had someone living alone who was 65 years of age or older. The average household size was 2.06 and the average family size was 3.16.

The township's age distribution consisted of 26.3% under the age of 18, 8.0% from 18 to 24, 16.6% from 25 to 44, 25.1% from 45 to 64, and 23.9% who were 65 years of age or older. The median age was 43.6 years. For every 100 females, there were 129.8 males. For every 100 females age 18 and over, there were 131.6 males.

The median income for a household in the township was $27,344, and the median income for a family was $62,778. Males had a median income of $41,719 versus $25,938 for females. The per capita income for the township was $19,784. About 6.0% of families and 24.1% of the population were below the poverty line, including 9.7% of those under age 18 and 36.6% of those age 65 or over.

Historical population
Census	Pop.	Note	%±
2010	658		—
2020	617		−6.2%
U.S. Decennial Census

== School districts ==
- Flora Community Unit School District 35

== Political districts ==
- Illinois' 19th congressional district
- State House District 108
- State Senate District 54
