= Oskaloosa Township, Clay County, Illinois =

Oskaloosa Township
- Township
- Location in Clay County

- Clay County's location in Illinois
- Coordinates: 38°47′N 88°38′W
- Country: United States
- State: Illinois
- County: Clay
- Established: November 5, 1861

Area
  - Total: 37.39 sq mi (96.8 km^{2})
  - Land: 37.37 sq mi (96.8 km^{2})
  - Water: 0.02 sq mi (0.052 km^{2}) 0.05%
- Elevation: 531 ft (162 m)

Population (2020)
  - Total: 362
  - Density: 9.69/sq mi (3.74/km^{2})
- Time zone: UTC-6 (CST)
  - Summer (DST): UTC-5 (CDT)
- ZIP codes: 62838, 62858, 62899
- FIPS code: 17-025-56835

Oskaloosa Township is one of twelve townships in Clay County, Illinois, USA. As of the 2020 census, its population was 362 and it contained 147 housing units.

== Geography ==
According to the 2010 census, the township (T4N R5E) has a total area of 37.39 square miles (96.8 km^{2}), of which 37.37 square miles (96.8 km^{2}) (or 99.95%) is land and 0.02 square miles (0.052 km^{2}) (or 0.05%) is water.

=== Unincorporated towns ===
- Oskaloosa

(This list is based on USGS data and may include former settlements.)

=== Cemeteries ===
The township contains these three cemeteries: Negro, Oskaloosa and Stipp.

== Demographics ==
As of the 2020 census there were 362 people, 217 households, and 163 families residing in the township. The population density was 9.68 inhabitants per square mile (3.74/km^{2}). There were 147 housing units at an average density of 3.93 per square mile (1.52/km^{2}). The racial makeup of the township was 98.34% White, 0.00% African American, 0.28% Native American, 0.00% Asian, 0.00% Pacific Islander, 0.00% from other races, and 1.38% from two or more races. Hispanic or Latino of any race were 0.83% of the population.

There were 217 households, out of which 11.50% had children under the age of 18 living with them, 49.31% were married couples living together, 2.76% had a female householder with no spouse present, and 24.88% were non-families. 24.90% of all households were made up of individuals, and none had someone living alone who was 65 years of age or older. The average household size was 2.12 and the average family size was 2.19.

The township's age distribution consisted of 13.1% under the age of 18, 22.7% from 18 to 24, 18.9% from 25 to 44, 41.4% from 45 to 64, and 3.9% who were 65 years of age or older. The median age was 30.4 years. For every 100 females, there were 90.5 males. For every 100 females age 18 and over, there were 105.7 males.

The median income for a household in the township was $66,767, and the median income for a family was $87,031. Males had a median income of $46,250 versus $14,914 for females. The per capita income for the township was $29,395. About 16.0% of families and 23.0% of the population were below the poverty line, including 21.9% of those under age 18 and none of those age 65 or over.

Historical population
Census	Pop.	Note	%±
2010	322		—
2020	362		12.4%
U.S. Decennial Census

== School districts ==
- North Clay Community Unit School District 25

== Political districts ==
- Illinois' 19th congressional district
- State House District 108
- State Senate District 54
