= Songer Township, Clay County, Illinois =

Songer Township
- Township
- Location in Clay County

- Clay County's location in Illinois
- Coordinates: 38°41′N 88°38′W
- Country: United States
- State: Illinois
- County: Clay
- Established: November 5, 1861

Area
  - Total: 37.42 sq mi (96.9 km^{2})
  - Land: 37.31 sq mi (96.6 km^{2})
  - Water: 0.11 sq mi (0.28 km^{2}) 0.29%
- Elevation: 535 ft (163 m)

Population (2020)
  - Total: 337
  - Density: 9.03/sq mi (3.49/km^{2})
- Time zone: UTC-6 (CST)
  - Summer (DST): UTC-5 (CDT)
- ZIP codes: 62858, 62899
- FIPS code: 17-025-70486

Songer Township is one of twelve townships in Clay County, Illinois, USA. As of the 2020 census, its population was 337 and it contained 165 housing units.

== Geography ==
According to the 2010 census, the township (T3N R5E) has a total area of 37.42 square miles (96.9 km^{2}), of which 37.31 square miles (96.6 km^{2}) (or 99.71%) is land and 0.11 square miles (0.28 km^{2}) (or 0.29%) is water.

=== Unincorporated towns ===
- Bethel (historical)

(This list is based on USGS data and may include former settlements.)

=== Cemeteries ===
The township contains these four cemeteries: Edwards Family, Oak Mound, Parker and Songer.

=== Major highways ===
- US Route 50

=== Lakes ===
- Greendale Lake

== Demographics ==
As of the 2020 census there were 337 people, 125 households, and 55 families residing in the township. The population density was 9.01 inhabitants per square mile (3.48/km^{2}). There were 165 housing units at an average density of 4.41 per square mile (1.70/km^{2}). The racial makeup of the township was 95.25% White, 0.59% African American, 0.00% Native American, 0.59% Asian, 0.00% Pacific Islander, 0.59% from other races, and 2.97% from two or more races. Hispanic or Latino of any race were 1.19% of the population.

There were 125 households, out of which none had children under the age of 18 living with them, 44.00% were married couples living together, none had a female householder with no spouse present, and 56.00% were non-families. 32.80% of all households were made up of individuals, and 15.20% had someone living alone who was 65 years of age or older. The average household size was 1.93 and the average family size was 2.53.

The township's age distribution consisted of no one under the age of 18, no one from 18 to 24, 10.3% from 25 to 44, 39.9% from 45 to 64, and 49.8% who were 65 years of age or older. The median age was 63.0 years. For every 100 females, there were 164.8 males. For every 100 females age 18 and over, there were 164.8 males.

The median income for a household in the township was $55,625, and the median income for a family was $56,518. The per capita income for the township was $36,364. No families and 6.6% of the population were below the poverty line.

Historical population
Census	Pop.	Note	%±
2010	342		—
2020	337		−1.5%
U.S. Decennial Census

== School districts ==
- Flora Community Unit School District 35

== Political districts ==
- Illinois' 19th congressional district
- State House District 108
- State Senate District 54
