= Flora, Illinois =

Flora
- City
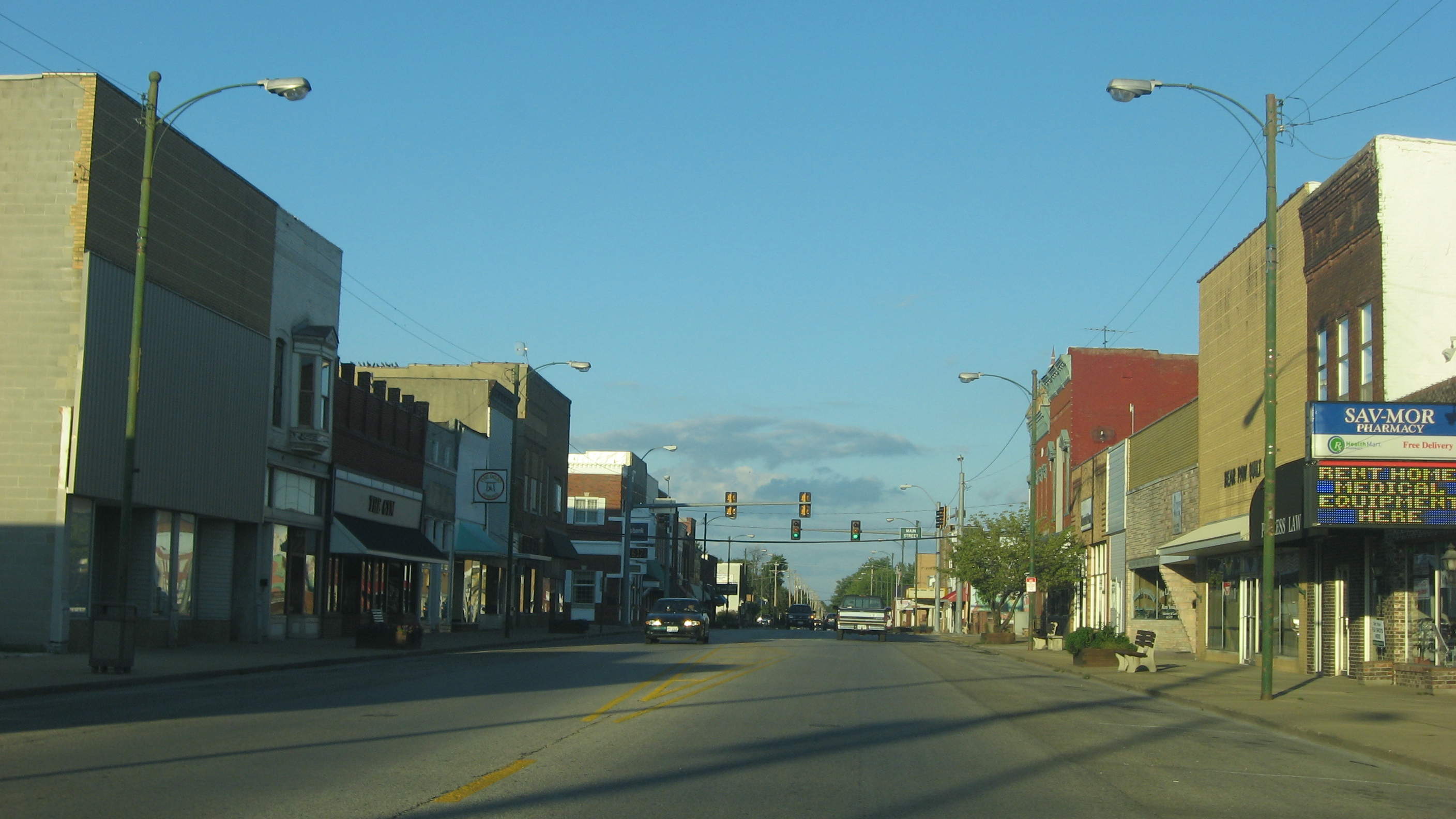
- Downtown Flora
- Motto: "Good things happen when good people work together"
- Location of Flora in Clay County, Illinois.
- Coordinates: 38°40′08″N 88°29′21″W
- Country: United States
- State: Illinois
- County: Clay

Area
  - Total: 4.69 sq mi (12.15 km^{2})
  - Land: 4.69 sq mi (12.15 km^{2})
  - Water: 0 sq mi (0.00 km^{2})
- Elevation: 482 ft (147 m)

Population (2020)
  - Total: 4,803
  - Density: 1,024.0/sq mi (395.37/km^{2})
- Time zone: UTC-6 (CST)
  - Summer (DST): UTC-5 (CDT)
- ZIP Code(s): 62839
- Area code: 618
- FIPS code: 17-26454
- GNIS feature ID: 2394773
- Website: City of Flora, Illinois

Flora is a city in Clay County, Illinois, United States. The population was 4,803 at the 2020 census.

== History ==
Flora was founded by Samuel White. White was born September 10, 1831, in Warren County, Ohio. He and his family came to Clay County in 1852. During that time, he purchased 85 acres (34 ha) of land from the State of Illinois. His first wife, Sarah Ann Wall was born in 1833. Sarah died December 13, 1859, in Flora, and is buried in the family plot in Elmwood Cemetery. In December 1860, White married Helen M. Riggs in Flora.

The original town of Flora was laid out, surveyed and platted in February 1854 by Ethelred Nixon, County Surveyor; John Brown, Trustee for Songer, Camp & Company; and Samuel White. It embraced eighty-five acres of the west half of Section 25, Township 3 north Range 6 east. Samuel White who still owned the land, deeded one-half interest in forty acres to John Brown, Trustee, with a view of securing the town and depot. An effort had already been made to establish a town one mile west called Mooresville, where over 100 lots had been sold and some buildings done. After the collapse of that village, the principal house was moved to Flora, and was then known as the "Commercial House."

Samuel White also donated land to the City of Flora for several buildings and the city park. The City Park, at that time called the Public Square, is present day Library Park where Flora Public Library is located. White donated land for the 1st schoolhouse, the Baptist Church and parsonage. Land was also donated for streets and alleys of the original town of Flora. The city's founder died November 15, 1912, in Sterling, Colorado, and was returned to Flora for burial in the family plot at Elmwood.

From "Flora, Illinois - Founded 1854" compiled by Flora Resident, Jeanie Briscoe. The book also contains historic information about the B & O railroad, the history of various buildings, and obituaries of some of Flora's early citizens.

== Geography ==
According to the 2021 census gazetteer files, Flora has a total area of 4.69 square miles (12.15 km^{2}), all land.

=== Climate ===
Climate data for Flora, Illinois, 1991–2020 normals, extremes 2000–present
Month	Jan	Feb	Mar	Apr	May	Jun	Jul	Aug	Sep	Oct	Nov	Dec	Year
Record high °F (°C)	70 (21)	76 (24)	85 (29)	89 (32)	95 (35)	105 (41)	107 (42)	102 (39)	101 (38)	95 (35)	83 (28)	72 (22)	107 (42)
Mean maximum °F (°C)	61.3 (16.3)	66.6 (19.2)	75.5 (24.2)	83.9 (28.8)	90.3 (32.4)	96.1 (35.6)	97.0 (36.1)	96.3 (35.7)	94.3 (34.6)	86.8 (30.4)	74.1 (23.4)	64.6 (18.1)	99.0 (37.2)
Mean daily maximum °F (°C)	38.8 (3.8)	44.2 (6.8)	54.5 (12.5)	67.1 (19.5)	76.8 (24.9)	86.0 (30.0)	89.0 (31.7)	87.8 (31.0)	81.6 (27.6)	69.0 (20.6)	54.8 (12.7)	43.2 (6.2)	66.1 (18.9)
Daily mean °F (°C)	30.0 (−1.1)	34.5 (1.4)	43.8 (6.6)	55.3 (12.9)	65.5 (18.6)	74.7 (23.7)	77.4 (25.2)	75.6 (24.2)	68.5 (20.3)	56.6 (13.7)	44.2 (6.8)	34.5 (1.4)	55.1 (12.8)
Mean daily minimum °F (°C)	21.2 (−6.0)	24.7 (−4.1)	33.0 (0.6)	43.5 (6.4)	54.1 (12.3)	63.3 (17.4)	65.8 (18.8)	63.4 (17.4)	55.4 (13.0)	44.3 (6.8)	33.6 (0.9)	25.9 (−3.4)	44.0 (6.7)
Mean minimum °F (°C)	1.9 (−16.7)	5.6 (−14.7)	17.5 (−8.1)	29.7 (−1.3)	39.9 (4.4)	53.3 (11.8)	57.1 (13.9)	54.6 (12.6)	44.3 (6.8)	30.6 (−0.8)	19.7 (−6.8)	10.6 (−11.9)	−0.7 (−18.2)
Record low °F (°C)	−14 (−26)	−9 (−23)	2 (−17)	23 (−5)	34 (1)	41 (5)	51 (11)	47 (8)	36 (2)	24 (−4)	6 (−14)	−7 (−22)	−14 (−26)
Average precipitation inches (mm)	2.95 (75)	2.54 (65)	3.83 (97)	5.31 (135)	5.09 (129)	5.86 (149)	4.19 (106)	3.73 (95)	3.34 (85)	3.67 (93)	4.23 (107)	3.26 (83)	48.00 (1,219)
Average snowfall inches (cm)	3.1 (7.9)	3.2 (8.1)	0.8 (2.0)	0.0 (0.0)	0.0 (0.0)	0.0 (0.0)	0.0 (0.0)	0.0 (0.0)	0.0 (0.0)	0.0 (0.0)	0.0 (0.0)	4.5 (11)	11.6 (29)
Average precipitation days (≥ 0.01 in)	7.2	7.5	9.7	9.4	12.1	10.2	7.9	7.3	6.5	8.4	8.7	9.0	103.9
Average snowy days (≥ 0.1 in)	1.8	1.5	0.2	0.0	0.0	0.0	0.0	0.0	0.0	0.0	0.0	1.3	4.8
Source 1: NOAA
Source 2: National Weather Service (mean maxima/minima 2006–2020)

== Demographics ==
Historical population
Census	Pop.	Note	%±
1860	456		—
1870	1,339		193.6%
1880	1,494		11.6%
1890	1,695		13.5%
1900	2,311		36.3%
1910	2,704		17.0%
1920	3,558		31.6%
1930	4,393		23.5%
1940	5,474		24.6%
1950	5,255		−4.0%
1960	5,331		1.4%
1970	5,283		−0.9%
1980	5,379		1.8%
1990	5,054		−6.0%
2000	5,128		1.5%
2010	5,070		−1.1%
2020	4,803		−5.3%
U.S. Decennial Census

=== 2020 census ===
As of the 2020 census, Flora had a population of 4,803 and 1,115 families.

The population density was 1,024.09 inhabitants per square mile (395.40/km^{2}). There were 2,278 housing units at an average density of 485.71 per square mile (187.53/km^{2}).

The median age was 39.5 years. 23.2% of residents were under the age of 18 and 20.4% of residents were 65 years of age or older. For every 100 females there were 86.5 males, and for every 100 females age 18 and over there were 84.7 males age 18 and over.

98.9% of residents lived in urban areas, while 1.1% lived in rural areas.

There were 2,053 households in Flora, of which 29.1% had children under the age of 18 living in them. Of all households, 39.2% were married-couple households, 19.6% were households with a male householder and no spouse or partner present, and 33.6% were households with a female householder and no spouse or partner present. About 37.1% of all households were made up of individuals and 17.2% had someone living alone who was 65 years of age or older.

Of all housing units, 9.9% were vacant. The homeowner vacancy rate was 3.8% and the rental vacancy rate was 6.5%.

Racial composition as of the 2020 census
Race	Number	Percent
White	4,433	92.3%
Black or African American	22	0.5%
American Indian and Alaska Native	21	0.4%
Asian	59	1.2%
Native Hawaiian and Other Pacific Islander	0	0.0%
Some other race	54	1.1%
Two or more races	214	4.5%
Hispanic or Latino (of any race)	116	2.4%

=== Income and poverty ===
The median income for a household in the city was $49,722, and the median income for a family was $60,660. Males had a median income of $43,538 versus $27,326 for females. The per capita income for the city was $27,726. About 11.5% of families and 17.0% of the population were below the poverty line, including 16.0% of those under age 18 and 9.0% of those age 65 or over.

== Economy ==
In September 1960, Flora was named "Ford Town USA" and some 1500 vehicle owners were supplied with a new Ford car or truck to drive during that week.

Flora's main industry is agriculture, although there are companies located in Flora that employ several hundreds. Flora is surrounded by a gently rolling countryside, with approximately 80-85% of it dedicated to farming and livestock.

== The Flora B&O Depot ==
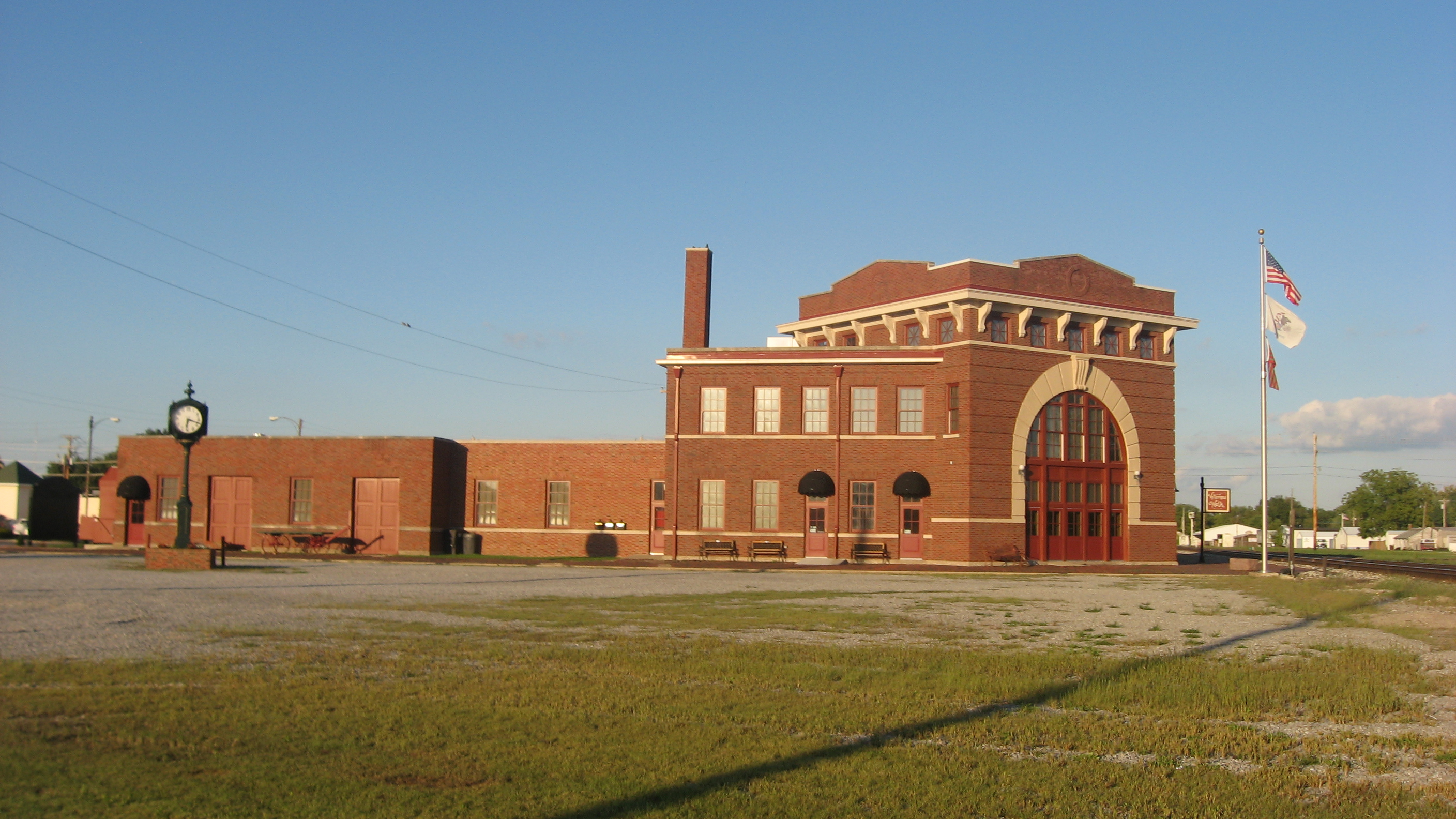
Former Baltimore & Ohio railroad depot in Flora, Illinois

The Flora B&O Depot was built in 1872 with generous help from local citizens. It served the City of Flora until 1916, when it was destroyed by fire.

In 1916–1917, a new three-story brick depot was built. This building was a huge part of the economic life of the community during those early years. In the 1920s, the railroad employed half the wage earners in Flora. In 1924, three hundred employees worked at the local station.

When the depot was completed in 1917, it contained three floors. The main floor was used for passengers. It had a large waiting room with a baggage room and restrooms. The Western Union office, yard office, mailroom and ticket office were also located on this floor.

The second floor held the offices of important depot members. Men who occupied these offices included the chief clerk, division engineer, superintendents, dispatchers, carpenters, signal supervisors, train masters and road foremen, plus railroad law enforcement officers and the district's own physician.

The third floor contained large offices. Later, these offices became one social room. It was here that railroad employees and their families held potluck dinners and socials. Not only was the depot a hub of transportation and commerce, it was a center for much of the social life in the community.

In the 1950s, as roads improved, cars became the chief means of transportation. Travelers no longer looked to trains as the primary source of transportation. The depot became less important to the community and the days of hosting 12 passenger trains, daily passing through Flora, became a fond memory.

In 1998, the Flora B&O Depot was named one of three sites in Clay County on the National Register of Historic Places. With this recognition and the interest of many citizens of the community, the Flora Community Development Corporation (FCDC) purchased the depot from CSX Railroad.

FCDC successfully obtained three federal grants to restore the building, matched by local donations of citizens. Today, the University of Illinois Extension Service rents the third floor. The second floor is a community room available to rent for various activities. The first floor houses the Flora Chamber of Commerce office, a museum containing city and county historical artifacts and two unfinished room available for occupancy.

== Prison Bid Campaign ==
In 1987 a group of Flora officials formed the so-called "Barbed Wire Choir" and recorded a music video in an attempt to land a state prison. The song featured several city officials, including the mayor, asking then-Gov. Jim Thompson "Is we is or is we isn't/gonna get ourselves a prison." After being shown on local TV stations, the video gained the attention of national programs such as MTV, Good Morning America and The Late Show Starring Joan Rivers. Flora ultimately lost its bid to host the new prison.

== Notable people ==
- Bill Ernest, President and managing director, Asia, for Walt Disney Parks & Resorts
- Mad Man Pondo, pro wrestler
- John Powless, basketball and tennis coach at University of Wisconsin
- Tim Tetrick, harness racing driver
