= Sailor Springs, Illinois =

Sailor Springs
- Village
- Location of Sailor Springs in Clay County, Illinois.
- Coordinates: 38°45′52″N 88°21′37″W
- Country: United States
- State: Illinois
- County: Clay

Government
  - Village president: Homer Britton

Area
  - Total: 0.26 sq mi (0.67 km^{2})
  - Land: 0.26 sq mi (0.67 km^{2})
  - Water: 0 sq mi (0.00 km^{2})
- Elevation: 449 ft (137 m)

Population (2020)
  - Total: 89
  - Density: 342.2/sq mi (132.12/km^{2})
- Time zone: UTC-6 (CST)
  - Summer (DST): UTC-5 (CDT)
- ZIP code: 62824
- Area code: 618
- FIPS code: 17-66599
- GNIS feature ID: 2399156

Sailor Springs is a village in Clay County, Illinois, United States. The population was 89 at the 2020 census.

== Geography ==
Sailor Springs is located in eastern Clay County, the county seat, is 8 miles (13 km) to the west.

According to the 2021 census gazetteer files, Sailor Springs has a total area of 0.26 square miles (0.67 km^{2}), all land.

== Demographics ==
Historical population
Census	Pop.	Note	%±
1900	479		—
1910	388		−19.0%
1920	284		−26.8%
1930	231		−18.7%
1940	305		32.0%
1950	259		−15.1%
1960	187		−27.8%
1970	137		−26.7%
1980	159		16.1%
1990	136		−14.5%
2000	128		−5.9%
2010	95		−25.8%
2020	89		−6.3%
U.S. Decennial Census

As of the 2020 census there were 89 people, 49 households, and 40 families residing in the village. The population density was 342.31 inhabitants per square mile (132.17/km^{2}). There were 50 housing units at an average density of 192.31 per square mile (74.25/km^{2}). The racial makeup of the village was 91.01% White, 1.12% Asian, and 7.87% from two or more races. Hispanic or Latino of any race were 1.12% of the population.

There were 49 households, out of which 22.4% had children under the age of 18 living with them, 69.39% were married couples living together, 8.16% had a female householder with no husband present, and 18.37% were non-families. 18.37% of all households were made up of individuals, and 6.12% had someone living alone who was 65 years of age or older. The average household size was 2.38 and the average family size was 2.33.

The village's age distribution consisted of 14.9% under the age of 18, 3.5% from 18 to 24, 15.8% from 25 to 44, 42.9% from 45 to 64, and 22.8% who were 65 years of age or older. The median age was 53.5 years. For every 100 females, there were 137.5 males. For every 100 females age 18 and over, there were 142.5 males.

The median income for a household in the village was $63,125, and the median income for a family was $64,250. Males had a median income of $51,000 versus $11,250 for females. The per capita income for the village was $22,834. About 10.0% of families and 20.7% of the population were below the poverty line, including 50.0% of those under age 18 and 11.5% of those age 65 or over.
