= Louisville, Illinois =

- Village
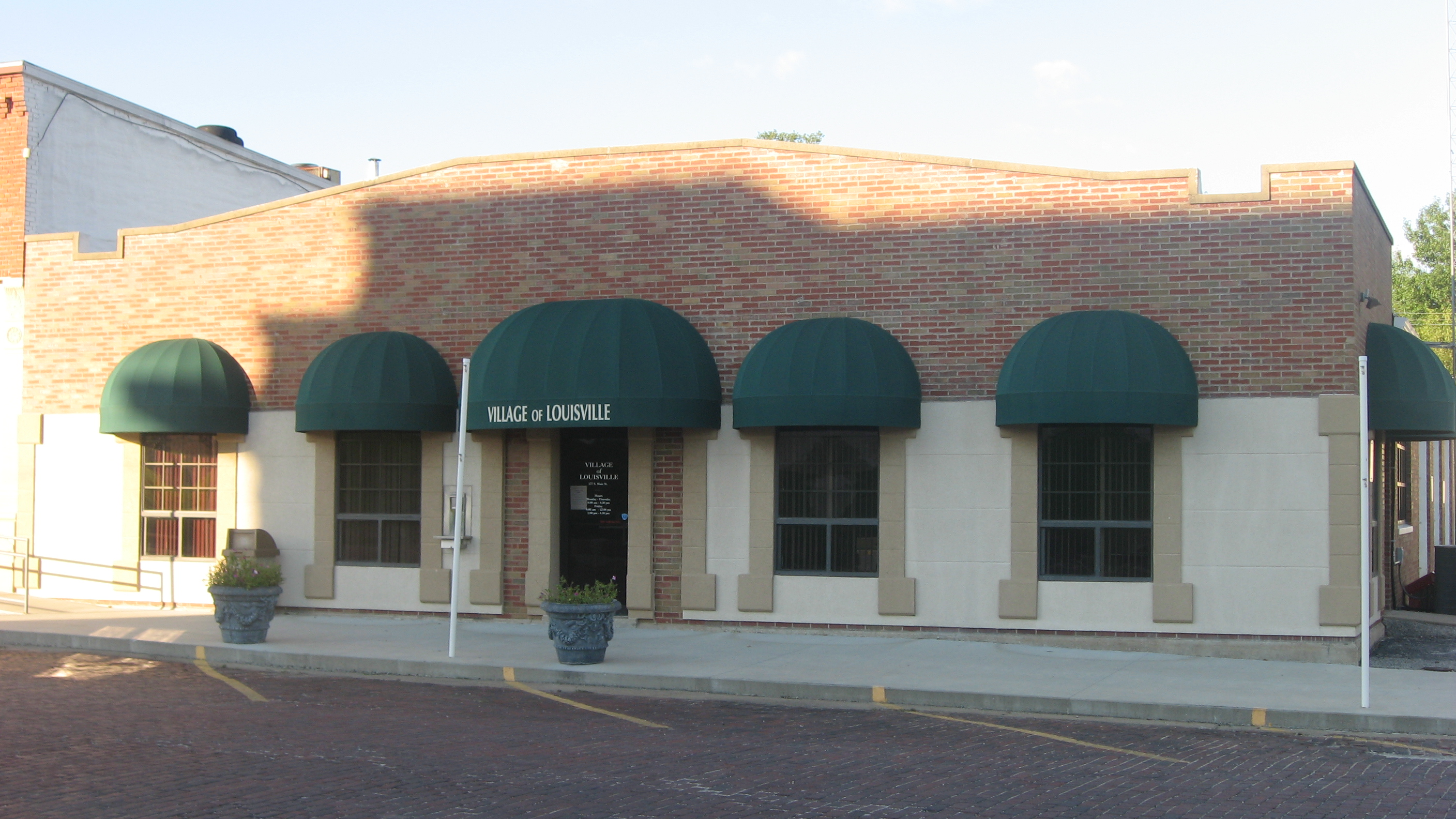
- Village Hall
- Interactive map of Louisville, Illinois
- Location within Illinois Location within the United States
- Coordinates: 38°46′07″N 88°30′12″W
- Country: United States
- State: Illinois
- County: Clay

Area
  - Total: 0.83 sq mi (2.15 km^{2})
  - Land: 0.83 sq mi (2.15 km^{2})
  - Water: 0 sq mi (0.00 km^{2})
- Elevation: 476 ft (145 m)

Population (2020)
  - Total: 1,136
  - Density: 1,371/sq mi (529.5/km^{2})
- Time zone: UTC−6 (CST)
  - Summer (DST): UTC−5 (CDT)
- ZIP code: 62858
- Area code: 618
- FIPS code: 17-44927
- GNIS feature ID: 2399192
- Website: louisvilleil.com

Louisville (/ˈluːɪsvɪl/ LOO-iss-vil) is a village in and the county seat of Clay County, Illinois, United States, along the Little Wabash River. The population was 1,136 at the 2020 census.

== History ==
The village was named for the Lewis family of settlers.

=== Grand Army of the Republic ===
The Grand Army of the Republic had a post known as the Louisville Post, No. 249 with the post name of William J. Stephenson. The post received its charter May 18, 1883.

== Geography ==
Louisville is located near the center of Clay County. U.S. Route 45 passes through the village, leading north 25 miles (40 km) to Effingham and south 8 miles (13 km) to Flora.

According to the 2021 census gazetteer files, Louisville has a total area of 0.83 square miles (2.15 km^{2}), all land. The Little Wabash River flows past the east side of the village.

== Demographics ==
Historical population
| Census | Pop. | Note | %± |
|---|---|---|---|
| 1860 | 313 | | — |
| 1870 | 529 | | 69.0% |
| 1880 | 514 | | −2.8% |
| 1890 | 637 | | 23.9% |
| 1900 | 646 | | 1.4% |
| 1910 | 670 | | 3.7% |
| 1920 | 797 | | 19.0% |
| 1930 | 803 | | 0.8% |
| 1940 | 925 | | 15.2% |
| 1950 | 970 | | 4.9% |
| 1960 | 906 | | −6.6% |
| 1970 | 1,020 | | 12.6% |
| 1980 | 1,166 | | 14.3% |
| 1990 | 1,098 | | −5.8% |
| 2000 | 1,242 | | 13.1% |
| 2010 | 1,139 | | −8.3% |
| 2020 | 1,136 | | −0.3% |
U.S. Decennial Census

=== 2020 census ===
As of the 2020 census, Louisville had a population of 1,136. The median age was 43.6 years. 22.4% of residents were under the age of 18 and 18.0% of residents were 65 years of age or older. For every 100 females there were 100.4 males, and for every 100 females age 18 and over there were 100.7 males age 18 and over.

There were 431 households and 252 families residing in the village. Of all households, 29.9% had children under the age of 18 living in them. Of all households, 43.6% were married-couple households, 20.9% were households with a male householder and no spouse or partner present, and 29.7% were households with a female householder and no spouse or partner present. About 34.1% of all households were made up of individuals, and 14.3% had someone living alone who was 65 years of age or older.

0.0% of residents lived in urban areas, while 100.0% lived in rural areas.

There were 486 housing units, of which 11.3% were vacant, at an average density of 586.96 per square mile (226.63/km^{2}). The population density was 1,371.98 inhabitants per square mile (529.72/km^{2}). The homeowner vacancy rate was 3.2% and the rental vacancy rate was 8.5%.

Racial composition as of the 2020 census
| Race | Number | Percent |
|---|---|---|
| White | 1,059 | 93.2% |
| Black or African American | 2 | 0.2% |
| American Indian and Alaska Native | 2 | 0.2% |
| Asian | 2 | 0.2% |
| Native Hawaiian and Other Pacific Islander | 0 | 0.0% |
| Some other race | 27 | 2.4% |
| Two or more races | 44 | 3.9% |
| Hispanic or Latino (of any race) | 37 | 3.3% |

=== Income and poverty ===
The median income for a household in the village was $35,298, and the median income for a family was $48,750. Males had a median income of $38,507 versus $22,109 for females. The per capita income for the village was $23,773. About 17.5% of families and 21.0% of the population were below the poverty line, including 27.5% of those under age 18 and 6.1% of those age 65 or over.

== Notable people ==
- Andy Haines Coach for the Pittsburgh Pirates
- Tom Richardson, pinch hitter for the St. Louis Browns
- John Riley Tanner, governor of Illinois January 11, 1897 – January 14, 1901
- Bailey Zimmerman, country musical artist
