= Jasper County Community Unit School District 1 =

School district in Jasper County, Illinois, United States

Address
- 1401 Clayton Ave. Newton, Jasper County, Illinois, 62448; United States
- Coordinates: 38.985°N 88.163°W

District information
- Type: Public
- Grades: PreK-12
- Superintendent: Joe Sornberger
- School board: Jasper County CUSD #1 Board of Education
- Chair of the board: Mandy Rieman
- Schools: Sainte Marie Elementary; Newton Elementary; Jasper County Junior High; Newton Community High
- NCES District ID: 1720380

Students and staff
- Students: 1172
- Teachers: 79
- Student–teacher ratio: 23.3:1

Other information
- Website: www.jaspercountyschools.net

Jasper County Community Unit School District 1 is a unified school district based in Jasper County's county seat of Newton, Illinois. It is the only school district in the county and the main educational body in Jasper County, although it serves portions of Effingham County and Cumberland County as well.

== Structure ==
The school district is composed of six schools in total; four elementary schools, one junior high school, and one high school. There is also a pre-kindergarten program run at the high school of the district should parents wish to enroll their children early. Willow Hill Elementary School, which is located in the village of its namesake, serves only kindergarteners; its proximity to the county seat and central position in the county allows its students to dawn from all parts of the county and still have access to the elementary school they will attend.

Grove Elementary School is located in Island Grove, Illinois, the highest point of elevation in the county. Grove Elementary School educates students from kindergarten to grade six, and it runs a pre-kindergarten program as well.

Ste. Marie Elementary School is located in the southern Jasper County village of Ste. Marie, and serves students in grades one through six.

Newton Elementary School is located in the county seat of Newton, and serves most of west Jasper County's first through sixth graders under principal Travis Wyatt.

The latter three elementary schools feed into Jasper County Junior High School and are taught in the facility during seventh and eighth grade before graduating into Newton Community High School. Students in grades nine through twelve spend the last portion of their education at this school. The district's mascot is the eagle.

Junior high electives include classes in environmental conservation, building newspapers, economics, art, and fitness. Jasper County Junior High School also runs a chorus program directed by Jeffrey Finley and a large band program, directed by Jeffrey Finley and Brian Ridlen, involving over 50% of the junior high.
