= Banner Township, Effingham County, Illinois =

Banner Township
- Township
- Location in Effingham County

- Effingham County's location in Illinois
- Coordinates: 39°12′N 88°38′W
- Country: United States
- State: Illinois
- County: Effingham

Area
  - Total: 18.03 sq mi (46.7 km^{2})
  - Land: 18.03 sq mi (46.7 km^{2})
  - Water: 0 sq mi (0 km^{2}) 0%
- Elevation: 633 ft (193 m)

Population (2020)
  - Total: 464
  - Density: 25.7/sq mi (9.94/km^{2})
- Time zone: UTC-6 (CST)
  - Summer (DST): UTC-5 (CDT)
- ZIP codes: 62401, 62461
- FIPS code: 17-049-03558

Banner Township is one of fifteen townships in Effingham County, Illinois, USA. As of the 2020 census, its population was 464 and it contained 209 housing units.

== History ==
Banner Township was formed out of the northern portion of Summit Township in September 1874. It originally had the name "Perry Township", which was later changed to Banner.

== Geography ==
Banner Township makes up the southern half of a survey township (Township 9 North, Range 5 East of the third principal meridian); the northern half of that survey township is located in Shelby County. According to the 2020 census, Banner Township has a total area of 18.03 square miles (46.7 km^{2}), all land.

=== Cities, towns, villages ===
- Shumway

=== Cemeteries ===
The township contains these four cemeteries: Rentfrow, Saint Marys, Shumway and Trinity Lutheran.

=== Major highways ===
- Illinois Route 32
- Illinois Route 33

== Demographics ==
Historical population
| Census | Pop. | Note | %± |
|---|---|---|---|
| 1880 | 657 | | — |
| 1890 | 612 | | −6.8% |
| 1900 | 662 | | 8.2% |
| 1910 | 651 | | −1.7% |
| 1920 | 581 | | −10.8% |
| 1930 | 418 | | −28.1% |
| 1940 | 444 | | 6.2% |
| 1950 | 502 | | 13.1% |
| 1960 | 451 | | −10.2% |
| 1970 | 490 | | 8.6% |
| 1980 | 543 | | 10.8% |
| 1990 | 539 | | −0.7% |
| 2000 | 545 | | 1.1% |
| 2010 | 456 | | −16.3% |
| 2020 | 464 | | 1.8% |
U.S. Decennial Census

As of the 2020 census there were 464 people, 139 households, and 91 families residing in the township. The population density was 25.73 inhabitants per square mile (9.93/km^{2}). There were 209 housing units at an average density of 11.59 per square mile (4.47/km^{2}). The racial makeup of the township was 92.67% White, 0.00% African American, 0.22% Native American, 0.65% Asian, 0.00% Pacific Islander, 0.65% from other races, and 5.82% from two or more races. Hispanic or Latino of any race were 2.37% of the population.

According to the 2020 American Community Survey, there were 139 households, out of which 23.00% had children under the age of 18 living with them, 57.55% were married couples living together, 4.32% had a female householder with no spouse present, and 34.53% were non-families. 25.20% of all households were made up of individuals, and 10.10% had someone living alone who was 65 years of age or older. The average household size was 2.29 and the average family size was 2.84.

The township's age distribution consisted of 19.8% under the age of 18, 3.1% from 18 to 24, 24.4% from 25 to 44, 28.6% from 45 to 64, and 23.9% who were 65 years of age or older. The median age was 50.6 years. For every 100 females, there were 113.4 males. For every 100 females age 18 and over, there were 112.5 males.

The median income for a household in the township was $57,083, and the median income for a family was $72,708. Males had a median income of $46,250 versus $36,250 for females. The per capita income for the township was $32,458. About 8.8% of families and 8.2% of the population were below the poverty line, including 4.8% of those under age 18 and 15.8% of those age 65 or over.

== School districts ==
- Beecher City Community Unit School District 20
- Effingham Community Unit School District 40
- Stewardson-Strasburg Community Unit District 5a
- Teutopolis Community Unit School District 50

== Political districts ==
- Illinois' 19th congressional district
- State House District 109
- State Senate District 55
