= Teutopolis Township, Effingham County, Illinois =

Teutopolis Township
- Township
- Location in Effingham County

- Effingham County's location in Illinois
- Coordinates: 39°08′N 88°30′W
- Country: United States
- State: Illinois
- County: Effingham

Area
  - Total: 17.04 sq mi (44.1 km^{2})
  - Land: 17.04 sq mi (44.1 km^{2})
  - Water: 0 sq mi (0 km^{2}) 0%
- Elevation: 600 ft (180 m)

Population (2020)
  - Total: 2,782
  - Density: 163.3/sq mi (63.04/km^{2})
- Time zone: UTC-6 (CST)
  - Summer (DST): UTC-5 (CDT)
- ZIP codes: 62401, 62467
- FIPS code: 17-049-74756

Teutopolis Township is one of fifteen townships in Effingham County, Illinois, USA. As of the 2020 census, its population was 2,782 and it contained 1,050 housing units. It was formed from Douglas Township in 1862 or 1863.

== Geography ==
According to the 2021 census gazetteer files, the township (E½ T8N R6E) has a total area of 17.04 square miles (44.1 km^{2}), all land.

=== Cities, towns, villages ===
- Effingham (east edge)
- Teutopolis (vast majority)

=== Cemeteries ===
The township contains these two cemeteries: Saint Francis and Wood Lawn.

=== Major highways ===
- Interstate 57
- Interstate 70
- U.S. Route 40
- U.S. Route 45
- Illinois Route 33

== Demographics ==
Historical population
Census	Pop.	Note	%±
1870	1,033		—
1880	952		−7.8%
1890	1,048		10.1%
1900	869		−17.1%
1910	983		13.1%
1920	1,035		5.3%
1930	983		−5.0%
1940	1,107		12.6%
1950	1,197		8.1%
1960	1,534		28.2%
1970	1,798		17.2%
1980	2,276		26.6%
1990	2,332		2.5%
2000	2,515		7.8%
2010	2,605		3.6%
2020	2,782		6.8%
U.S. Decennial Census

As of the 2020 census there were 2,782 people, 1,112 households, and 774 families residing in the township. The population density was 163.30 inhabitants per square mile (63.05/km^{2}). There were 1,050 housing units at an average density of 61.63 per square mile (23.80/km^{2}). The racial makeup of the township was 96.66% White, 0.14% African American, 0.29% Native American, 0.43% Asian, 0.00% Pacific Islander, 0.50% from other races, and 1.98% from two or more races. Hispanic or Latino of any race were 1.44% of the population.

There were 1,112 households, out of which 24.30% had children under the age of 18 living with them, 60.34% were married couples living together, 6.74% had a female householder with no spouse present, and 30.40% were non-families. 22.10% of all households were made up of individuals, and 10.30% had someone living alone who was 65 years of age or older. The average household size was 2.38 and the average family size was 2.92.

The township's age distribution consisted of 21.6% under the age of 18, 8.2% from 18 to 24, 24.3% from 25 to 44, 30% from 45 to 64, and 15.8% who were 65 years of age or older. The median age was 40.7 years. For every 100 females, there were 95.6 males. For every 100 females age 18 and over, there were 106.6 males.

The median income for a household in the township was $81,786, and the median income for a family was $94,531. Males had a median income of $50,104 versus $33,109 for females. The per capita income for the township was $35,617. About 0.6% of families and 2.5% of the population were below the poverty line, including 0.0% of those under age 18 and 9.5% of those age 65 or over.

== School districts ==
- Effingham Community Unit School District 40
- Teutopolis Community Unit School District 50

== Political districts ==
- Illinois's 19th congressional district
- State House District 108
- State Senate District 54
