= Jackson Township, Effingham County, Illinois =

Jackson Township
- Township
- Location in Effingham County

- Effingham County's location in Illinois
- Coordinates: 39°02′59″N 88°38′04″W
- Country: United States
- State: Illinois
- County: Effingham
- Established: November 6, 1860

Government
  - Road Commissioner: Adam Robertson

Area
  - Total: 37.47 sq mi (97.0 km^{2})
  - Land: 37.46 sq mi (97.0 km^{2})
  - Water: 0.01 sq mi (0.026 km^{2}) 0.02%
- Elevation: 564 ft (172 m)

Population (2020)
  - Total: 1,227
  - Density: 32.75/sq mi (12.65/km^{2})
- Time zone: UTC-6 (CST)
  - Summer (DST): UTC-5 (CDT)
- ZIP codes: 62401, 62411, 62443, 62473
- FIPS code: 17-049-38063

Jackson Township is one of fifteen townships in Effingham County, Illinois, USA. As of the 2020 census, its population was 1,227 and it contained 525 housing units.

== Geography ==
According to the 2021 census gazetteer files, Jackson Township has a total area of 37.47 square miles (97.05 km^{2}), of which 37.46 square miles (97.02 km^{2}) (or 99.98%) is land and 0.01 square miles (0.03 km^{2}) (or 0.02%) is water.

=== Cities, towns, villages ===
Two small portions of the west edge of Watson cross over into the eastern part of the township. The township contains no other incorporated communities.

=== Extinct towns ===
- Dexter
- Freenanton
- Keptown

=== Cemeteries ===
The township contains these eight cemeteries: Fremington, Funkhouser, Little Prairie, Miller Chapel, New Salem, Old Salem, Porter and Turner.

=== Major highways ===
- Interstate 57
- Interstate 70
- U.S. Route 40

== Demographics ==
Historical population
Census	Pop.	Note	%±
1870	1,028		—
1880	1,233		19.9%
1890	1,149		−6.8%
1900	1,186		3.2%
1910	1,053		−11.2%
1920	1,013		−3.8%
1930	855		−15.6%
1940	883		3.3%
1950	783		−11.3%
1960	694		−11.4%
1970	629		−9.4%
1980	951		51.2%
1990	1,023		7.6%
2000	1,178		15.2%
2010	1,215		3.1%
2020	1,227		1.0%
U.S. Decennial Census

As of the 2020 census there were 1,227 people, 429 households, and 354 families residing in the township. The population density was 32.75 inhabitants per square mile (12.64/km^{2}). There were 525 housing units at an average density of 14.01 per square mile (5.41/km^{2}). The racial makeup of the township was 96.58% White, 0.49% African American, 0.16% Native American, 0.00% Asian, 0.00% Pacific Islander, 0.41% from other races, and 2.36% from two or more races. Hispanic or Latino of any race were 0.98% of the population.

According to the 2020 American Community Survey, there were 429 households, out of which 36.60% had children under the age of 18 living with them, 66.67% were married couples living together, 1.40% had a female householder with no spouse present, and 17.48% were non-families. 17.50% of all households were made up of individuals, and 14.20% had someone living alone who was 65 years of age or older. The average household size was 2.57 and the average family size was 2.79.

The township's age distribution consisted of 24.8% under the age of 18, 10.3% from 18 to 24, 19.4% from 25 to 44, 21.5% from 45 to 64, and 23.9% who were 65 years of age or older. The median age was 42.1 years. For every 100 females, there were 100.4 males. For every 100 females age 18 and over, there were 101.5 males.

The median income for a household in the township was $53,472, and the median income for a family was $67,969. Males had a median income of $37,788 versus $20,682 for females. The per capita income for the township was $26,593. About 20.1% of families and 19.0% of the population were below the poverty line, including 27.4% of those under age 18 and 14.8% of those age 65 or over.

== School districts ==
- Altamont Community Unit School District 10
- Effingham Community Unit School District 40

== Political districts ==
- Illinois' 19th congressional district
- State House District 102
- State Senate District 51
