= Watson Township, Effingham County, Illinois =

Watson Township
- Township
- Location in Effingham County

- Effingham County's location in Illinois
- Coordinates: 39°03′N 88°31′W
- Country: United States
- State: Illinois
- County: Effingham
- Established: November 6, 1860

Area
  - Total: 35.83 sq mi (92.8 km^{2})
  - Land: 35.83 sq mi (92.8 km^{2})
  - Water: 0 sq mi (0 km^{2}) 0%
- Elevation: 525 ft (160 m)

Population (2020)
  - Total: 3,188
  - Density: 88.98/sq mi (34.35/km^{2})
- Time zone: UTC-6 (CST)
  - Summer (DST): UTC-5 (CDT)
- ZIP codes: 62401, 62424, 62467, 62473
- FIPS code: 17-049-79254
- Website: watsontownshipil.org

Watson Township is one of fifteen townships in Effingham County, Illinois, USA. As of the 2020 census, its population was 3,188 and it contained 1,298 housing units.

== Geography ==
According to the 2021 census gazetteer files, Watson Township (T7N R6E) has a total area of 35.83 square miles (92.80 km^{2}), all land.

=== Cities, towns, villages ===
- Effingham (south edge)
- Watson (vast majority)

=== Unincorporated towns ===
- Heartville

=== Cemeteries ===
The township contains these five cemeteries: Immanuel Lutheran, Loy Chapel, Old Loy, Rinehart and Watson.

=== Major highways ===
- US Route 45

=== Airports and landing strips ===
- Effingham County Memorial Airport
- Percival Airport

== Demographics ==
Historical population
Census	Pop.	Note	%±
1870	1,066		—
1880	1,002		−6.0%
1890	1,175		17.3%
1900	1,829		55.7%
1910	1,232		−32.6%
1920	1,155		−6.2%
1930	1,034		−10.5%
1940	1,101		6.5%
1950	962		−12.6%
1960	1,066		10.8%
1970	1,258		18.0%
1980	2,360		87.6%
1990	2,711		14.9%
2000	3,186		17.5%
2010	3,193		0.2%
2020	3,188		−0.2%
U.S. Decennial Census

As of the 2020 census there were 3,188 people, 1,298 households, and 861 families residing in the township. The population density was 88.97 inhabitants per square mile (34.35/km^{2}). There were 1,329 housing units at an average density of 37.09 per square mile (14.32/km^{2}). The racial makeup of the township was 94.51% White, 0.06% African American, 0.00% Native American, 0.19% Asian, 0.00% Pacific Islander, 1.10% from other races, and 4.14% from two or more races. Hispanic or Latino of any race were 2.54% of the population.

There were 1,298 households, out of which 29.10% had children under the age of 18 living with them, 53.70% were married couples living together, 6.70% had a female householder with no spouse present, and 33.67% were non-families. 28.10% of all households were made up of individuals, and 7.90% had someone living alone who was 65 years of age or older. The average household size was 2.43 and the average family size was 2.97.

The township's age distribution consisted of 22.5% under the age of 18, 5.6% from 18 to 24, 24.8% from 25 to 44, 32.7% from 45 to 64, and 14.5% who were 65 years of age or older. The median age was 41.6 years. For every 100 females, there were 116.7 males. For every 100 females age 18 and over, there were 113.5 males.

The median income for a household in the township was $62,400, and the median income for a family was $72,601. Males had a median income of $35,625 versus $27,622 for females. The per capita income for the township was $27,108. About 5.9% of families and 8.8% of the population were below the poverty line, including 9.4% of those under age 18 and 5.5% of those age 65 or over.

== School districts ==
- Dieterich Community Unit School District 30
- Effingham Community Unit School District 40
- Teutopolis Community Unit School District 50

== Political districts ==
- Illinois' 19th congressional district
- State House District 102
- State House District 108
- State Senate District 51
- State Senate District 54
