= Mound Township, Illinois =

Mound Township, Illinois may refer to one of the following townships:

- Mound Township, Effingham County, Illinois
- Mound Township, McDonough County, Illinois

Not to be confused with:

- Big Mound Township, Wayne County, Illinois
- Blue Mound Township, McLean County, Illinois
- Blue Mound Township, Macon County, Illinois
- Brushy Mound Township, Macoupin County, Illinois
- Pleasant Mound Township, Bond County, Illinois
- Scales Mound Township, Jo Daviess County, Illinois
- Western Mound Township, Macoupin County, Illinois

See also

- Mound Township (disambiguation)
