= Moccasin (disambiguation) =

A moccasin is a form of shoe worn by Native Americans, and by hunters, traders, and settlers in the frontier regions of North America.

Moccasin may also refer to:

- Moccasin (horse), an American Thoroughbred racehorse

== Places ==
- Moccasin, Arizona
- Moccasin, Tuolumne County, California
- Moccasin, Illinois
- Moccasin, Montana
- Moccasin Bend, a location near Chattanooga, Tennessee, in the United States
- Moccasin Mountains, a range at the Arizona-Utah border
- Moccasin Township, Effingham County, Illinois

== Plants ==
- Lady's slipper, an orchid, called the moccasin flower in the United States

== Ships ==
- USS Moccasin (1864), a tug in commission from 1864 to 1865 that was assigned to the North Atlantic Blockading Squadron during the American Civil War
- USS Moccasin (SS-5), a Plunger-class submarine in commission from 1903 to 1919
- USS Moccasin (ID-1322), a refrigerated cargo ship in commission from 1918 to 1919
- USRC Moccasin (1865), a Revenue Cutter purchased from the U.S. Navy in 1865

== Snakes ==
- Any member of the genus Gloydius, also known as Asian moccasins, a group of venomous pit vipers found in Asia
- Any member of the genus Agkistrodon, a group of venomous pit vipers found in North and Central America
- Deinagkistrodon acutus, also known as the Chinese moccasin, a venomous pit viper species found in China and Southeast Asia
- Calloselasma rhodostoma, also known as the Malayan moccasin, a venomous ground pit viper species found in Southeast Asia including Indonesia
- Heterodon platirhinos, also known as the eastern hog-nosed snake, a non-venomous colubrid species found in North America
