= Bishop Township, Effingham County, Illinois =

Bishop Township
- Township
- Location in Effingham County

- Effingham County's location in Illinois
- Coordinates: 39°03′N 88°25′W
- Country: United States
- State: Illinois
- County: Effingham
- Established: November 6, 1860

Area
  - Total: 34.94 sq mi (90.5 km^{2})
  - Land: 34.94 sq mi (90.5 km^{2})
  - Water: 0 sq mi (0 km^{2}) 0%
- Elevation: 584 ft (178 m)

Population (2020)
  - Total: 1,702
  - Density: 48.71/sq mi (18.81/km^{2})
- Time zone: UTC-6 (CST)
  - Summer (DST): UTC-5 (CDT)
- ZIP codes: 62401, 62424, 62467, 62479
- FIPS code: 17-049-06145

Bishop Township is one of fifteen townships in Effingham County, Illinois, USA. As of the 2020 census, its population was 1,702 and it contained 629 housing units.

== Geography ==
According to the 2021 census gazetteer files, Bishop Township has a total area of 34.94 square miles (90.49 km^{2}), all land.

=== Cities, towns, villages ===
- Dieterich

=== Extinct towns ===
- Elliottstown

=== Cemeteries ===
The township contains these five cemeteries: Dieterich, Immaculate Conception, King, Saint Aloysius and Saint John Lutheran.

=== Major highways ===
- Illinois Route 33

== Demographics ==
Historical population
Census	Pop.	Note	%±
1870	564		—
1880	915		62.2%
1890	967		5.7%
1900	1,092		12.9%
1910	1,126		3.1%
1920	1,098		−2.5%
1930	977		−11.0%
1940	1,029		5.3%
1950	973		−5.4%
1960	1,062		9.1%
1970	1,043		−1.8%
1980	1,190		14.1%
1990	1,200		0.8%
2000	1,407		17.3%
2010	1,408		0.1%
2020	1,702		20.9%
U.S. Decennial Census

As of the 2020 census there were 1,702 people, 647 households, and 448 families residing in the township. The population density was 48.71 inhabitants per square mile (18.81/km^{2}). There were 629 housing units at an average density of 18.00 per square mile (6.95/km^{2}). The racial makeup of the township was 97.00% White, 0.24% African American, 0.06% Native American, 0.41% Asian, 0.00% Pacific Islander, 0.35% from other races, and 1.94% from two or more races. Hispanic or Latino of any race were 1.00% of the population.

There were 647 households, out of which 40.20% had children under the age of 18 living with them, 63.68% were married couples living together, 3.55% had a female householder with no spouse present, and 30.76% were non-families. 28.30% of all households were made up of individuals, and 5.10% had someone living alone who was 65 years of age or older. The average household size was 2.68 and the average family size was 3.38.

According to the 2020 American Community Survey, the township's age distribution consisted of 30.0% under the age of 18, 7.1% from 18 to 24, 24.7% from 25 to 44, 29.1% from 45 to 64, and 9.0% who were 65 years of age or older. The median age was 34.0 years. For every 100 females, there were 118.0 males. For every 100 females age 18 and over, there were 118.0 males.

The median income for a household in the township was $71,328, and the median income for a family was $99,667. Males had a median income of $51,250 versus $34,432 for females. The per capita income for the township was $32,819. About 2.0% of families and 4.4% of the population were below the poverty line, including 5.8% of those under age 18 and 3.2% of those age 65 or over.

== School districts ==
- Dieterich Community Unit School District 30
- Teutopolis Community Unit School District, 50

== Political districts ==
- Illinois' 19th congressional district
- State House District 108
- State Senate District 54
