= West Township, Illinois =

West Township, Illinois may refer to one of the following townships:

- West Township, Effingham County, Illinois
- West Township, McLean County, Illinois

See also

- West Township (disambiguation)
