= Summit Township, Effingham County, Illinois =

Summit Township
- Township
- Location in Effingham County

- Effingham County's location in Illinois
- Coordinates: 39°08′N 88°38′W
- Country: United States
- State: Illinois
- County: Effingham
- Established: November 6, 1860

Area
  - Total: 34.54 sq mi (89.5 km^{2})
  - Land: 33.64 sq mi (87.1 km^{2})
  - Water: 0.9 sq mi (2.3 km^{2}) 2.61%
- Elevation: 607 ft (185 m)

Population (2020)
  - Total: 3,760
  - Density: 112/sq mi (43.2/km^{2})
- Time zone: UTC-6 (CST)
  - Summer (DST): UTC-5 (CDT)
- ZIP codes: 62401, 62411, 62461, 62473
- FIPS code: 17-049-73651

Summit Township is one of fifteen townships in Effingham County, Illinois, USA. As of the 2020 census, its population was 3,760 and it contained 1,774 housing units.

== Geography ==
According to the 2021 census gazetteer files, Summit Township has a total area of 34.54 square miles (89.46 km^{2}), of which 33.64 square miles (87.13 km^{2}) (or 97.39%) is land and 0.90 square miles (2.33 km^{2}) (or 2.61%) is water.

=== Cities, towns, villages ===
- Effingham (west edge)

=== Extinct towns ===
- Ewington
- Funkhouser

=== Cemeteries ===
The township contains these five cemeteries: Arborcrest, Blue Point Baptist, Brown, Ewington and Toothaker.

=== Major highways ===
- Interstate 57
- Interstate 70
- U.S. Route 40
- Illinois Route 32
- Illinois Route 33

== Demographics ==
Historical population
Census	Pop.	Note	%±
1870	1,432		—
1880	1,114		−22.2%
1890	941		−15.5%
1900	876		−6.9%
1910	908		3.7%
1920	796		−12.3%
1930	732		−8.0%
1940	781		6.7%
1950	704		−9.9%
1960	731		3.8%
1970	1,030		40.9%
1980	2,289		122.2%
1990	2,665		16.4%
2000	3,431		28.7%
2010	3,584		4.5%
2020	3,760		4.9%
U.S. Decennial Census

As of the 2020 census there were 3,760 people, 1,419 households, and 1,025 families residing in the township. The population density was 108.85 inhabitants per square mile (42.03/km^{2}). There were 1,774 housing units at an average density of 51.35 units per square mile (19.83 units/km^{2}). The racial makeup of the township was 95.19% White, 0.40% African American, 0.05% Native American, 0.74% Asian, 0.03% Pacific Islander, 0.51% from other races, and 3.09% from two or more races. Hispanic or Latino of any race were 1.91% of the population.

There were 1,419 households, out of which 31.20% had children under the age of 18 living with them, 60.25% were married couples living together, 6.06% had a female householder with no spouse present, and 27.77% were non-families. 23.40% of all households were made up of individuals, and 6.80% had someone living alone who was 65 years of age or older. The average household size was 2.47 and the average family size was 2.95.

The township's age distribution consisted of 26.1% under the age of 18, 4.3% from 18 to 24, 26.2% from 25 to 44, 27.6% from 45 to 64, and 15.8% who were 65 years of age or older. The median age was 40.4 years. For every 100 females, there were 97.5 males. For every 100 females age 18 and over, there were 101.1 males.

The median income for a household in the township was $87,583, and the median income for a family was $118,919. Males had a median income of $54,719 versus $32,404 for females. The per capita income for the township was $46,797. About 6.6% of families and 9.2% of the population were below the poverty line, including 3.2% of those under age 18 and 15.9% of those age 65 or over.

== School districts ==
- Altamont Community Unit School District 10
- Beecher City Community Unit School District 20
- Effingham Community Unit School District 40

== Political districts ==
- Illinois' 19th congressional district
- State House District 109
- State Senate District 55
