= Joseph P. Condo =

American politician

Joseph P. Condo (February 19, 1848 – August 19, 1923) was an American politician in Illinois for the Republican Party.

Condo was born in Centre County, Pennsylvania. He moved to Moccasin, Illinois in 1868 with his wife Agnes Condo (née Motz). Condo served on the Effingham County Board and was later elected to the Illinois House of Representatives from 1887 to 1889 and from 1895 to 1897. He was a member of the Altamont chapter of the Knights of Pythias. Condo died aged 75 in Pana, Illinois.
