= Liberty Township, Effingham County, Illinois =

Liberty Township
- Township
- Location in Effingham County

- Effingham County's location in Illinois
- Coordinates: 39°12′N 88°45′W
- Country: United States
- State: Illinois
- County: Effingham
- Established: November 6, 1860

Area
  - Total: 17.97 sq mi (46.5 km^{2})
  - Land: 17.97 sq mi (46.5 km^{2})
  - Water: 0 sq mi (0 km^{2}) 0%
- Elevation: 600 ft (180 m)

Population (2020)
  - Total: 731
  - Density: 40.7/sq mi (15.7/km^{2})
- Time zone: UTC-6 (CST)
  - Summer (DST): UTC-5 (CDT)
- ZIP codes: 62414, 62461
- FIPS code: 17-049-43159

Liberty Township is one of fifteen townships in Effingham County, Illinois, USA. As of the 2020 census, its population was 731 and it contained 351 housing units.

== Geography ==
According to the 2021 census gazetteer files, the township (S½ T9N R4E) has a total area of 17.97 square miles (46.5 km^{2}), all land.

=== Cities, towns, villages ===
- Beecher City

=== Extinct towns ===
- Holland, Illinois

=== Cemeteries ===
The township contains these four cemeteries: Agney, Beecher, Memorial Gardens and Tipsword.

=== Major highways ===
- Illinois Route 33

== Demographics ==
Historical population
Census	Pop.	Note	%±
1870	504		—
1880	641		27.2%
1890	783		22.2%
1900	805		2.8%
1910	819		1.7%
1920	794		−3.1%
1930	708		−10.8%
1940	917		29.5%
1950	783		−14.6%
1960	733		−6.4%
1970	745		1.6%
1980	874		17.3%
1990	734		−16.0%
2000	816		11.2%
2010	764		−6.4%
2020	731		−4.3%
U.S. Decennial Census

As of the 2020 census there were 731 people, 288 households, and 142 families residing in the township. The population density was 40.69 inhabitants per square mile (15.71/km^{2}). There were 351 housing units at an average density of 19.54 per square mile (7.54/km^{2}). The racial makeup of the township was 91.79% White, 0.27% African American, 0.27% Native American, 0.14% Asian, 0.14% Pacific Islander, 0.27% from other races, and 7.11% from two or more races. Hispanic or Latino of any race were 2.46% of the population.

There were 288 households, out of which 19.80% had children under the age of 18 living with them, 33.68% were married couples living together, 5.90% had a female householder with no spouse present, and 50.69% were non-families. 40.30% of all households were made up of individuals, and 13.50% had someone living alone who was 65 years of age or older. The average household size was 2.08 and the average family size was 2.80.

The township's age distribution consisted of 16.2% under the age of 18, 17.9% from 18 to 24, 18.4% from 25 to 44, 33.3% from 45 to 64, and 14.0% who were 65 years of age or older. The median age was 43.5 years. For every 100 females, there were 117.0 males. For every 100 females age 18 and over, there were 111.8 males.

The median income for a household in the township was $43,214, and the median income for a family was $64,000. Males had a median income of $34,318 versus $25,000 for females. The per capita income for the township was $28,544. About 11.3% of families and 14.5% of the population were below the poverty line, including 26.7% of those under age 18 and 16.7% of those age 65 or over.

== School districts ==
- Beecher City Community Unit School District 20

== Political districts ==
- Illinois' 19th congressional district
- State House District 109
- State Senate District 55
