= Mason Township, Effingham County, Illinois =

Mason Township
- Township
- Location in Effingham County

- Effingham County's location in Illinois
- Coordinates: 38°58′N 88°38′W
- Country: United States
- State: Illinois
- County: Effingham
- Established: November 6, 1860

Area
  - Total: 37.181 sq mi (96.30 km^{2})
  - Land: 37.145 sq mi (96.21 km^{2})
  - Water: 0.036 sq mi (0.093 km^{2}) 0.1%
- Elevation: 584 ft (178 m)

Population (2020)
  - Total: 1,275
  - Density: 34.32/sq mi (13.25/km^{2})
- Time zone: UTC-6 (CST)
  - Summer (DST): UTC-5 (CDT)
- ZIP codes: 62411, 62426, 62443, 62473
- FIPS code: 17-049-47462

Mason Township is one of fifteen townships in Effingham County, Illinois, USA. As of the 2020 census, its population was 1,275 and it contained 582 housing units.

== Geography ==
Mason Township corresponds to the survey township 6 North, Range 5 East of the third principal meridian. According to the 2020 census, it has a total area of 37.181 square miles (96.30 km^{2}), of which 37.145 square miles (96.21 km^{2}) (or 99.9%) is land and 0.036 square miles (0.093 km^{2}) (or 0.1%) is water.

=== Cities, towns, villages ===
- Edgewood
- Mason

=== Extinct towns ===
- Bristol

=== Cemeteries ===
The township contains these thirteen cemeteries: Bailey, Brockett, Brown, Davidson, Edgewood, Leith, Mason, New Hope, Old Mason, Robinson, Saint Ann's Catholic, Wabash and Wright.

=== Highways ===
- Interstate 57 passes through the township from southeast to northwest, and has two exits in the township: Exit 145 at Edgewood and Exit 151 near the Wildcat Hollow State Habitat Area.
- Illinois Route 37 runs roughly parallel to Interstate 57, passing through both Mason and Edgewood.

== Demographics ==
Historical population
Census	Pop.	Note	%±
1870	1,908		—
1880	1,828		−4.2%
1890	1,595		−12.7%
1900	1,707		7.0%
1910	1,597		−6.4%
1920	1,527		−4.4%
1930	1,451		−5.0%
1940	1,411		−2.8%
1950	1,381		−2.1%
1960	1,328		−3.8%
1970	1,322		−0.5%
1980	1,524		15.3%
1990	1,411		−7.4%
2000	1,510		7.0%
2010	1,364		−9.7%
2020	1,275		−6.5%
U.S. Decennial Census

As of the 2020 census there were 1,275 people, 568 households, and 407 families residing in the township. The population density was 34.29 inhabitants per square mile (13.24/km^{2}). There were 582 housing units at an average density of 15.65 per square mile (6.04/km^{2}). The racial makeup of the township was 93.25% White, 0.55% African American, 0.31% Native American, 0.47% Asian, 0.00% Pacific Islander, 1.18% from other races, and 4.24% from two or more races. Hispanic or Latino of any race were 1.41% of the population.

There were 568 households, out of which 29.90% had children under the age of 18 living with them, 58.98% were married couples living together, 4.75% had a female householder with no spouse present, and 28.35% were non-families. 16.00% of all households were made up of individuals, and 7.70% had someone living alone who was 65 years of age or older. The average household size was 2.40 and the average family size was 2.68.

The township's age distribution consisted of 18.2% under the age of 18, 14.4% from 18 to 24, 19.8% from 25 to 44, 30.5% from 45 to 64, and 17.1% who were 65 years of age or older. The median age was 41.0 years. For every 100 females, there were 115.3 males. For every 100 females age 18 and over, there were 114.4 males.

The median income for a household in the township was $45,313, and the median income for a family was $48,125. Males had a median income of $36,196 versus $25,833 for females. The per capita income for the township was $22,582. About 7.1% of families and 10.3% of the population were below the poverty line, including 21.2% of those under age 18 and 10.3% of those age 65 or over.

== School districts ==
- Altamont Community Unit School District 10
- Effingham Community Unit School District 40

== Political districts ==
- Illinois' 19th congressional district
- State House District 102
- State Senate District 51
