= Douglas Township, Effingham County, Illinois =

Douglas Township
- Township
- Location in Effingham County

- Effingham County's location in Illinois
- Coordinates: 39°10′N 88°32′W
- Country: United States
- State: Illinois
- County: Effingham
- Established: November 6, 1860

Area
  - Total: 33.64 sq mi (87.1 km^{2})
  - Land: 33.58 sq mi (87.0 km^{2})
  - Water: 0.06 sq mi (0.16 km^{2}) 0.18%
- Elevation: 610 ft (190 m)

Population (2020)
  - Total: 12,556
  - Density: 373.9/sq mi (144.4/km^{2})
- Time zone: UTC-6 (CST)
  - Summer (DST): UTC-5 (CDT)
- ZIP codes: 62401, 62467
- FIPS code: 17-049-20474

Douglas Township is one of fifteen townships in Effingham County, Illinois, USA. As of the 2020 census, its population was 12,556 and it contained 5,947 housing units.

== Geography ==
According to the 2021 census gazetteer files, Douglas Township has a total area of 33.64 square miles (87.13 km^{2}), of which 33.58 square miles (86.97 km^{2}) (or 99.83%) is land and 0.06 square miles (0.16 km^{2}) (or 0.17%) is water.

=== Cities, towns, villages ===
- Effingham (vast majority)

=== Extinct towns ===
- Green Creek

=== Cemeteries ===
The township contains these five cemeteries: Effingham City, Green Creek, Ramsey, Saint Anthony Catholic and Saint John Lutheran.

=== Major highways ===
- Interstate 57
- U.S. Route 40
- U.S. Route 45
- Illinois Route 32
- Illinois Route 33

=== Airports and landing strips ===
- Saint Anthony Memorial Hospital Heliport

=== Landmarks ===
- Oak Ridge Cemetery

== Demographics ==
Historical population
Census	Pop.	Note	%±
1870	3,222		—
1880	4,007		24.4%
1890	4,211		5.1%
1900	4,716		12.0%
1910	4,858		3.0%
1920	5,028		3.5%
1930	6,291		25.1%
1940	7,679		22.1%
1950	8,817		14.8%
1960	10,096		14.5%
1970	10,904		8.0%
1980	12,156		11.5%
1990	12,566		3.4%
2000	12,698		1.1%
2010	12,604		−0.7%
2020	12,556		−0.4%
U.S. Decennial Census

As of the 2020 census there were 12,556 people, 5,268 households, and 3,188 families residing in the township. The population density was 373.29 inhabitants per square mile (144.13/km^{2}). There were 5,947 housing units at an average density of 176.80 per square mile (68.26/km^{2}). The racial makeup of the township was 91.76% White, 0.80% African American, 0.22% Native American, 1.27% Asian, 0.02% Pacific Islander, 1.55% from other races, and 4.36% from two or more races. Hispanic or Latino of any race were 4.01% of the population.

According to the 2020 American Community Survey, there were 5,268 households, out of which 29.80% had children under the age of 18 living with them, 44.44% were married couples living together, 11.31% had a female householder with no spouse present, and 39.48% were non-families. 30.80% of all households were made up of individuals, and 16.00% had someone living alone who was 65 years of age or older. The average household size was 2.35 and the average family size was 2.93.

The township's age distribution consisted of 23.1% under the age of 18, 8.2% from 18 to 24, 25.8% from 25 to 44, 23.9% from 45 to 64, and 19.1% who were 65 years of age or older. The median age was 37.5 years. For every 100 females, there were 89.6 males. For every 100 females age 18 and over, there were 84.8 males.

The median income for a household in the township was $54,215, and the median income for a family was $70,285. Males had a median income of $37,440 versus $26,837 for females. The per capita income for the township was $31,730. About 10.3% of families and 16.0% of the population were below the poverty line, including 28.4% of those under age 18 and 8.7% of those age 65 or over.

== School districts ==
- Beecher City Community Unit School District 20
- Effingham Community Unit School District 40
- Stewardson-Strasburg Community Unit District 5a
- Teutopolis Community Unit School District 50

== Political districts ==
- Illinois' 19th congressional district
- State House District 102
- State House District 108
- State Senate District 51
- State Senate District 54
