= Union Township, Effingham County, Illinois =

Union Township
- Township
- Location in Effingham County

- Effingham County's location in Illinois
- Coordinates: 38°58′N 88°31′W
- Country: United States
- State: Illinois
- County: Effingham
- Established: November 6, 1860

Area
  - Total: 35.84 sq mi (92.8 km^{2})
  - Land: 35.79 sq mi (92.7 km^{2})
  - Water: 0.05 sq mi (0.13 km^{2}) 0.13%
- Elevation: 518 ft (158 m)

Population (2020)
  - Total: 755
  - Density: 21.1/sq mi (8.14/km^{2})
- Time zone: UTC-6 (CST)
  - Summer (DST): UTC-5 (CDT)
- ZIP codes: 62424, 62443, 62473, 62858
- FIPS code: 17-049-76654

Union Township is one of fifteen townships in Effingham County, Illinois, USA. As of the 2020 census, its population was 755 and it contained 320 housing units.

== Geography ==
According to the 2021 census gazetteer files, Union Township (T6N R6E) has a total area of 35.84 square miles (92.83 km^{2}), of which 35.79 square miles (92.70 km^{2}) (or 99.87%) is land and 0.05 square miles (0.13 km^{2}) (or 0.13%) is water.

=== Extinct towns ===
- Flemingsburg
- Hill

=== Cemeteries ===
The township contains these five cemeteries: Bethsaida, Hull, Poe, Ridge and Saint John.

=== Major highways ===
- US Route 45

== Demographics ==
Historical population
Census	Pop.	Note	%±
1870	637		—
1880	765		20.1%
1890	924		20.8%
1900	1,152		24.7%
1910	1,045		−9.3%
1920	933		−10.7%
1930	800		−14.3%
1940	765		−4.4%
1950	602		−21.3%
1960	515		−14.5%
1970	431		−16.3%
1980	588		36.4%
1990	534		−9.2%
2000	768		43.8%
2010	742		−3.4%
2020	755		1.8%
U.S. Decennial Census

As of the 2020 census there were 755 people, 271 households, and 208 families residing in the township. The population density was 21.07 inhabitants per square mile (8.14/km^{2}). There were 320 housing units at an average density of 8.93 per square mile (3.45/km^{2}). The racial makeup of the township was 97.09% White, 0.00% African American, 0.13% Native American, 0.00% Asian, 0.00% Pacific Islander, 0.79% from other races, and 1.99% from two or more races. Hispanic or Latino of any race were 1.19% of the population.

There were 271 households, out of which 39.90% had children under the age of 18 living with them, 54.24% were married couples living together, 14.39% had a female householder with no spouse present, and 23.25% were non-families. 20.30% of all households were made up of individuals, and 4.10% had someone living alone who was 65 years of age or older. The average household size was 2.59 and the average family size was 2.96.

The township's age distribution consisted of 30.2% under the age of 18, 1.0% from 18 to 24, 30.7% from 25 to 44, 27.3% from 45 to 64, and 10.7% who were 65 years of age or older. The median age was 34.2 years. For every 100 females, there were 81.4 males. For every 100 females age 18 and over, there were 85.6 males.

The median income for a household in the township was $55,461, and the median income for a family was $68,333. Males had a median income of $43,438 versus $22,500 for females. The per capita income for the township was $23,778. About 14.9% of families and 20.7% of the population were below the poverty line, including 35.8% of those under age 18 and 0.0% of those age 65 or over.

== School districts ==
- Dieterich Community Unit School District 30
- Effingham Community Unit School District 40

== Political districts ==
- Illinois' 19th congressional district
- State House District 108
- State Senate District 54
