= Mound Township, Effingham County, Illinois =

Mound Township
- Township
- Location in Effingham County

- Effingham County's location in Illinois
- Coordinates: 39°03′N 88°45′W
- Country: United States
- State: Illinois
- County: Effingham
- Established: November 6, 1860

Area
  - Total: 37.1 sq mi (96 km^{2})
  - Land: 36.97 sq mi (95.8 km^{2})
  - Water: 0.13 sq mi (0.34 km^{2}) 0.35%
- Elevation: 614 ft (187 m)

Population (2020)
  - Total: 3,575
  - Density: 96.70/sq mi (37.34/km^{2})
- Time zone: UTC-6 (CST)
  - Summer (DST): UTC-5 (CDT)
- ZIP codes: 62411, 62458
- FIPS code: 17-049-50725

Mound Township is one of fifteen townships in Effingham County, Illinois, USA. As of the 2020 census, its population was 3,575 and it contained 1,541 housing units.

== Geography ==
According to the 2021 census gazetteer files, Mound Township (T7N R4E) has a total area of 37.10 square miles (96.09 km^{2}), of which 36.97 square miles (95.75 km^{2}) (or 99.65%) is land and 0.13 square miles (0.34 km^{2}) (or 0.35%) is water.

=== Cities, towns, villages ===
- Altamont

East Meadows and Southmore Heights are subdivisions of Altamont

=== Extinct towns ===
Dexter

=== Cemeteries ===
The township contains these ten cemeteries: Bethlehem, Drysdale, German Methodist, Immanuel Lutheran, McCoy, Newman, Saint Clare Catholic, Union, Union and Zion Lutheran.

=== Major highways ===
- Interstate 70
- U.S. Route 40
- Illinois Route 128

== Demographics ==
Historical population
Census	Pop.	Note	%±
1870	1,211		—
1880	1,870		54.4%
1890	2,225		19.0%
1900	2,446		9.9%
1910	2,363		−3.4%
1920	2,347		−0.7%
1930	2,120		−9.7%
1940	3,067		44.7%
1950	2,349		−23.4%
1960	2,421		3.1%
1970	2,599		7.4%
1980	3,504		34.8%
1990	3,413		−2.6%
2000	3,434		0.6%
2010	3,648		6.2%
2020	3,575		−2.0%
U.S. Decennial Census

As of the 2020 census there were 3,575 people, 1,560 households, and 1,001 families residing in the township. The population density was 96.37 inhabitants per square mile (37.21/km^{2}). There were 1,541 housing units at an average density of 41.54 per square mile (16.04/km^{2}). The racial makeup of the township was 95.41% White, 0.17% African American, 0.31% Native American, 0.34% Asian, 0.00% Pacific Islander, 0.48% from other races, and 3.30% from two or more races. Hispanic or Latino of any race were 1.40% of the population.

According to the 2020 American Community Survey, there were 1,560 households, out of which 26.90% had children under the age of 18 living with them, 47.88% were married couples living together, 9.36% had a female householder with no spouse present, and 35.83% were non-families. 33.50% of all households were made up of individuals, and 17.50% had someone living alone who was 65 years of age or older. The average household size was 2.26 and the average family size was 2.80.

The township's age distribution consisted of 20.4% under the age of 18, 6.1% from 18 to 24, 26.8% from 25 to 44, 22.4% from 45 to 64, and 24.3% who were 65 years of age or older. The median age was 41.7 years. For every 100 females, there were 105.6 males. For every 100 females age 18 and over, there were 99.6 males.

The median income for a household in the township was $51,389, and the median income for a family was $78,870. Males had a median income of $43,424 versus $30,044 for females. The per capita income for the township was $32,491. About 7.4% of families and 10.0% of the population were below the poverty line, including 12.8% of those under age 18 and 5.4% of those age 65 or over.

== School districts ==
- Altamont Community Unit School District 10

== Political districts ==
- Illinois' 19th congressional district
- State House District 102
- State House District 109
- State Senate District 51
- State Senate District 55
