= Gilmore, Effingham County, Illinois =

Gilmore, Illinois
- Unincorporated community
- Location within Illinois Location within the United States
- Coordinates: 38°59′15″N 88°43′03″W
- Country: United States
- State: Illinois
- County: Effingham
- Elevation: 581 ft (177 m)
- Time zone: UTC-6 (Central (CST))
  - Summer (DST): UTC-5 (CDT)
- Area code: 217
- GNIS feature ID: 409028

Gilmore is an unincorporated community in Effingham County, Illinois, United States. Gilmore is 5.5 miles (8.9 km) west-northwest of Mason.
