= Dr. Charles M. Wright House =

Historic house in Illinois, United States

- U.S. National Register of Historic Places
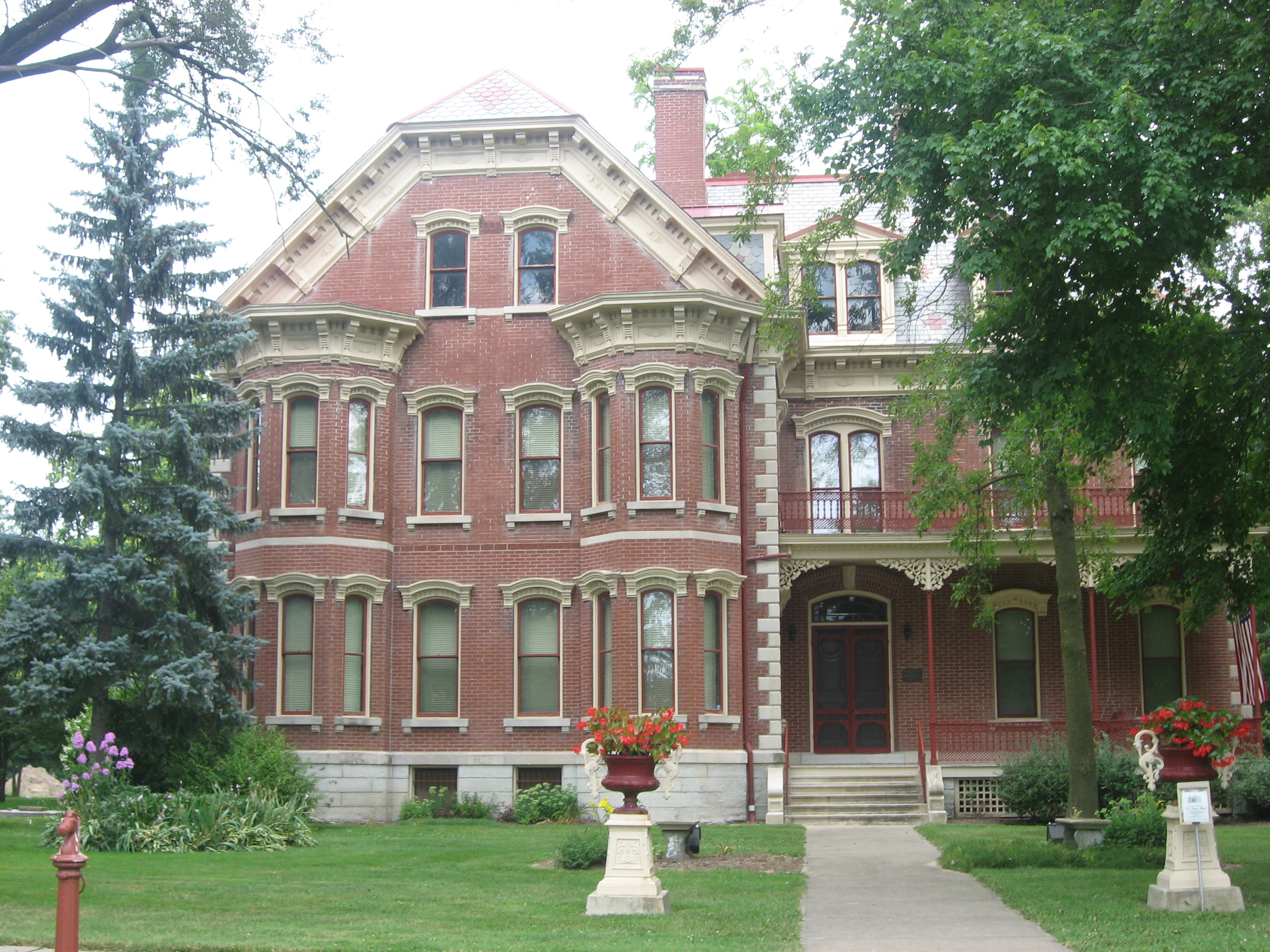
- Front of the house

- Location within Illinois Location within the United States
- Location: 3 W. Jackson St., Altamont, Illinois
- Coordinates: 39°3′36″N 88°44′56″W
- Area: 3 acres (1.2 ha)
- Architectural style: Italianate
- NRHP reference No.: 86001018
- Added to NRHP: May 8, 1986

The Dr. Charles M. Wright House is a historic house located at 3 W. Jackson St. in Altamont, Illinois. The house was built in 1889 for Charles M. Wright I and his family. Wright, one of the only doctors in western Effingham County until his retirement in 1878, ran the only bank in Altamont at the time. Architect Charles H. Spilman designed the house in the Italianate style. The brick house has an asymmetrical front facade with two bay windows to the left of the front entrance; the window bays are topped by a large half-hipped dormer. The house's cornice and the tops of the window bays are decorated with brackets. Charles M. Wright III, JD was the last member of the Wright family to live in the house. He died in 2001.

The house was listed on the National Register of Historic Places in 1986. It is one of two sites in Effingham County listed on the Register, along with the Effingham County Courthouse.

It has been open for tours since 2003.

It is owned and operated by Wright House Property Trust, First Mid Wealth Management Trustee. It is a not-for-profit, 501(C)3. The advisory board composed of community members works with the bank representative and is responsible for tours and fundraisers conducted by volunteers.
