= Heartville, Illinois =

- Unincorporated community
- Location within Illinois Location within the United States
- Coordinates: 39°03′02″N 88°32′36″W
- Country: United States
- State: Illinois
- County: Effingham
- Elevation: 561 ft (171 m)
- Time zone: UTC-6 (Central (CST))
  - Summer (DST): UTC-5 (CDT)
- Area codes: 217, 618
- GNIS feature ID: 1725657

Heartville is an unincorporated community in Effingham County, Illinois. It is located about two miles northeast of Watson, Illinois. U.S. Route 45 runs through it.
