= West Township =

West Township may refer to:

== Illinois ==
- West Township, Effingham County, Illinois
- West Township, McLean County, Illinois

== Indiana ==
- West Township, Marshall County, Indiana

== Iowa ==
- West Township, Montgomery County, Iowa

== Missouri ==
- West Township, New Madrid County, Missouri

== New York ==
- West Township, a hamlet in the town of Knox, Albany County, New York

== Ohio ==
- West Township, Columbiana County, Ohio

== Pennsylvania ==
- West Township, Huntingdon County, Pennsylvania
