= Mound Township =

Mound Township may refer to:

- Mound Township, Effingham County, Illinois
- Mound Township, McDonough County, Illinois
- Mound Township, Warren County, Indiana
- Mound Township, McPherson County, Kansas
- Mound Township, Miami County, Kansas, in Miami County, Kansas
- Mound Township, Phillips County, Kansas, in Phillips County, Kansas
- Mound Township, Rock County, Minnesota
- Mound Township, Bates County, Missouri
- Mound Township, Slope County, North Dakota, in Slope County, North Dakota
