= Illinois Route 128 =

State highway in Illinois, United States

Illinois Route 128
- IL 128 highlighted in red

Route information
- Maintained by IDOT
- Length: 55.57 mi (89.43 km)
- Existed: 1924–present

Major junctions
- South end: I-70 in Altamont
- US 40 in Altamont
- North end: IL 121 in Dalton City

Location
- Country: United States
- State: Illinois
- Counties: Effingham, Fayette, Shelby, Macon, Moultrie

Highway system
- Illinois State Highway System; Interstate; US; State; Tollways; Scenic
← IL 127	→ IL 129

Illinois Route 128 is a north–south state route in east-central Illinois. It runs from Interstate 70 in Altamont to Illinois Route 121 in Dalton City. This is a distance of 55.57 miles (89.43 km).

== Route description ==
Illinois 128 is a two-lane, rural surface road for its entire length. Immediately north of Interstate 70, it overlaps U.S. Route 40 for 3 miles (5 km). It is also concurrent with Illinois Route 16 near Shelbyville.

Illinois 128 may or may not run through Moultrie County, depending on its exact routing, as the route appears to run along portions of the Shelby/Moultrie and Macon/Moultrie county lines.

== History ==
SBI Route 128 originally ran from U.S. Route 40 (originally Illinois Route 11) to Illinois 16 west of Shelbyville. In March 1937, it replaced IL 169 north of Shelbyville to Dalton City. Finally, as Interstate 70 was being built in the 1950s and 1960s, it was extended along U.S. 40 to Altamont.

== Major Intersections ==
County	Location	mi	km	Destinations	Notes
Effingham	Altamont	0.0	0.0	I-70 – Effingham, St. Louis	I-70 exit 82
Effingham	Altamont	0.8	1.3	US 40 east	South end of US 40 concurrency
Effingham–Fayette county line		4.1	6.6	US 40 west – Vandalia	North end of US 40 concurrency
Effingham–Fayette county line		14.5	23.3	IL 33 east – Beecher City	
Shelby		30.9	49.7	IL 16 west – Pana	South end of IL 16 concurrency
Shelby	Shelbyville	34.0	54.7	IL 16 east – Mattoon	North end of IL 16 concurrency
Moultrie	Dalton City	55.57	89.43	IL 121 – Decatur, Mattoon	
1.000 mi = 1.609 km; 1.000 km = 0.621 mi: Concurrency terminus
