= Dexter, Illinois =

- Unincorporated community
- Location within Illinois Location within the United States
- Coordinates: 39°04′51″N 88°41′00″W
- Country: United States
- State: Illinois
- County: Effingham
- Elevation: 597 ft (182 m)
- Time zone: UTC-6 (Central (CST))
  - Summer (DST): UTC-5 (CDT)
- Area code: 217
- GNIS feature ID: 422622

Dexter is an unincorporated community in Effingham County, in the U.S. state of Illinois.

== History ==
The Dexter post office closed in 1926. The community's name honors Josia Lufkin Dexter, a local pioneer.
