= Elliottstown, Illinois =

- Unincorporated community
- Location of Elliottstown in Illinois
- Coordinates: 39°00′04″N 88°27′10″W
- Country: United States
- State: Illinois
- County: Effingham
- Elevation: 568 ft (173 m)
- Time zone: UTC-6 (Central (CST))
  - Summer (DST): UTC-5 (CDT)
- GNIS feature ID: 407896

Elliottstown is an unincorporated community in Lucas township, Effingham County, Illinois, United States.

Elliottstown is located at the juncture of E 600th Avenue and N 1900th Street, and the nearby juncture of E 600th Avenue and 1775th Road. It is in Effingham County. Elliottstown (often misspelled as “Elliotstown”) is in Dieterich Unit 30 school district.
