= Moccasin Township, Effingham County, Illinois =

Moccasin Township
- Township
- Location in Effingham County

- Effingham County's location in Illinois
- Coordinates: 39°08′N 88°45′W
- Country: United States
- State: Illinois
- County: Effingham
- Established: November 6, 1860

Area
  - Total: 35.6 sq mi (92 km^{2})
  - Land: 35.59 sq mi (92.2 km^{2})
  - Water: 0.01 sq mi (0.026 km^{2}) 0.03%
- Elevation: 610 ft (190 m)

Population (2020)
  - Total: 528
  - Density: 14.8/sq mi (5.73/km^{2})
- Time zone: UTC-6 (CST)
  - Summer (DST): UTC-5 (CDT)
- ZIP codes: 62411, 62414, 62461
- FIPS code: 17-049-49763

Moccasin Township is one of fifteen townships in Effingham County, Illinois, USA. As of the 2020 census, its population was 528 and it contained 227 housing units.

== Geography ==
According to the 2010 census, the township (T8N R4E) has a total area of 35.6 square miles (92 km^{2}), of which 35.59 square miles (92.2 km^{2}) (or 99.97%) is land and 0.01 square miles (0.026 km^{2}) (or 0.03%) is water.

=== Unincorporated towns ===
- Moccasin

=== Extinct towns ===
- Blue Point

=== Cemeteries ===
The township contains these three cemeteries: Moccasin, Pleasant Grove and Saint Paul Lutheran.

== Demographics ==
Historical population
Census	Pop.	Note	%±
1870	1,088		—
1880	1,123		3.2%
1890	950		−15.4%
1900	898		−5.5%
1910	897		−0.1%
1920	858		−4.3%
1930	568		−33.8%
1940	758		33.5%
1950	559		−26.3%
1960	504		−9.8%
1970	435		−13.7%
1980	496		14.0%
1990	454		−8.5%
2000	522		15.0%
2010	484		−7.3%
2020	528		9.1%
U.S. Decennial Census

As of the 2020 census there were 528 people, 105 households, and 93 families residing in the township. The population density was 14.83 inhabitants per square mile (5.73/km^{2}). There were 227 housing units at an average density of 6.38 per square mile (2.46/km^{2}). The racial makeup of the township was 92.05% White, 0.38% African American, 0.00% Native American, 0.19% Asian, 0.19% Pacific Islander, 0.57% from other races, and 6.63% from two or more races. Hispanic or Latino of any race were 3.03% of the population.

According to the 2020 American Community Survey, there were 105 households, out of which 39.00% had children under the age of 18 living with them, 75.24% were married couples living together, 1.90% had a female householder with no spouse present, and 11.43% were non-families. 7.60% of all households were made up of individuals, and 3.80% had someone living alone who was 65 years of age or older. The average household size was 2.78 and the average family size was 2.97.

The township's age distribution consisted of 29.1% under the age of 18, 0.0% from 18 to 24, 17.9% from 25 to 44, 37.7% from 45 to 64, and 15.4% who were 65 years of age or older. The median age was 46.6 years. For every 100 females, there were 100.0 males. For every 100 females age 18 and over, there were 97.1 males.

The median income for a household in the township was $107,361, and the median income for a family was $108,250. Males had a median income of $80,893 versus $42,679 for females. The per capita income for the township was $69,790. About 2.2% of families and 2.4% of the population were below the poverty line, including 5.9% of those under age 18 and 0.0% of those age 65 or over.

== School districts ==
- Altamont Community Unit School District 10
- Beecher City Community Unit School District 20

== Political districts ==
- Illinois' 19th congressional district
- State House District 109
- State Senate District 55
