= Funkhouser, Illinois =

- Unincorporated community
- Location within Illinois Location within the United States
- Coordinates: 39°05′39″N 88°37′16″W
- Country: United States
- State: Illinois
- County: Effingham
- Elevation: 581 ft (177 m)
- Time zone: UTC-6 (Central (CST))
  - Summer (DST): UTC-5 (CDT)
- Area code: 217
- GNIS feature ID: 408817

Funkhouser is an unincorporated community in Effingham County, Illinois, United States. It is part of the Effingham, IL Micropolitan Statistical Area.
