= Mason, Illinois =

- Town
- Location of Mason in Effingham County, Illinois.
- Coordinates: 38°57′13″N 88°37′24″W
- Country: United States
- State: Illinois
- County: Effingham
- Incorporated: February 15, 1865

Area
  - Total: 1.29 sq mi (3.35 km^{2})
  - Land: 1.29 sq mi (3.33 km^{2})
  - Water: 0.0039 sq mi (0.01 km^{2})
- Elevation: 591 ft (180 m)

Population (2020)
  - Total: 323
  - Density: 250.9/sq mi (96.87/km^{2})
- Time zone: UTC-6 (CST)
  - Summer (DST): UTC-5 (CDT)
- ZIP code: 62443
- Area code: 618
- FIPS code: 17-47449
- GNIS ID: 2396740

Mason is an incorporated town in Effingham County, Illinois, United States. The population was 323 at the 2020 census. It was named after Roswell Mason, an official of the Illinois Central Railroad. Mason is part of the Effingham, IL Micropolitan Statistical Area.

== Geography ==
Mason is located in southern Effingham County. Illinois Route 37 passes through the town, leading northeast 6 miles (10 km) to Watson and southwest 3 miles (5 km) to Edgewood. Interstate 57 crosses the northwest corner of Mason, but the closest access is from Edgewood to the southwest or from Exit 151 4 miles (6 km) to the northeast. Via I-57 it is 14 miles (23 km) north to Effingham, the county seat, and 55 miles (89 km) southwest to Mount Vernon.

According to the 2021 census gazetteer files, Mason has a total area of 1.29 square miles (3.34 km^{2}), of which 1.29 square miles (3.34 km^{2}) (or 99.61%) is land and 0.01 square miles (0.03 km^{2}) (or 0.39%) is water.

== Demographics ==
Historical population
Census	Pop.	Note	%±
1860	197		—
1870	490		148.7%
1880	621		26.7%
1890	425		−31.6%
1900	369		−13.2%
1910	345		−6.5%
1920	324		−6.1%
1930	328		1.2%
1940	330		0.6%
1950	327		−0.9%
1960	332		1.5%
1970	415		25.0%
1980	480		15.7%
1990	387		−19.4%
2000	396		2.3%
2010	345		−12.9%
2020	323		−6.4%
U.S. Decennial Census

As of the 2020 census there were 323 people, 107 households, and 74 families residing in the town. The population density was 250.00 inhabitants per square mile (96.53/km^{2}). There were 154 housing units at an average density of 119.20 per square mile (46.02/km^{2}). The racial makeup of the town was 88.85% White, 0.93% African American, 0.62% Native American, 1.24% Asian, 0.00% Pacific Islander, 1.86% from other races, and 6.50% from two or more races. Hispanic or Latino of any race were 1.86% of the population.

There were 107 households, out of which 28.0% had children under the age of 18 living with them, 57.94% were married couples living together, 7.48% had a female householder with no husband present, and 30.84% were non-families. 23.36% of all households were made up of individuals, and 12.15% had someone living alone who was 65 years of age or older. The average household size was 2.70 and the average family size was 2.27.

The town's age distribution consisted of 18.5% under the age of 18, 4.1% from 18 to 24, 26.7% from 25 to 44, 31.2% from 45 to 64, and 19.3% who were 65 years of age or older. The median age was 45.5 years. For every 100 females, there were 115.0 males. For every 100 females age 18 and over, there were 117.6 males.

The median income for a household in the town was $53,750, and the median income for a family was $58,000. Males had a median income of $37,292 versus $21,806 for females. The per capita income for the town was $22,940. About 9.5% of families and 11.5% of the population were below the poverty line, including 26.7% of those under age 18 and 6.4% of those age 65 or over.

== Notable people ==
- Lowell Bayles, air race pilot
- Ada Kepley, author and first American woman to graduate law school, owned a farm in Mason township
- Mason Ruffner, singer, songwriter, musician
