= West Township, Effingham County, Illinois =

West Township
- Township
- Location in Effingham County

- Effingham County's location in Illinois
- Coordinates: 38°58′N 88°45′W
- Country: United States
- State: Illinois
- County: Effingham
- Established: November 6, 1860

Area
  - Total: 36.96 sq mi (95.7 km^{2})
  - Land: 36.92 sq mi (95.6 km^{2})
  - Water: 0.04 sq mi (0.10 km^{2}) 0.10%
- Elevation: 587 ft (179 m)

Population (2020)
  - Total: 444
  - Density: 12.0/sq mi (4.64/km^{2})
- Time zone: UTC-6 (CST)
  - Summer (DST): UTC-5 (CDT)
- ZIP codes: 62411, 62426, 62443, 62458, 62838
- FIPS code: 17-049-79891

West Township is one of fifteen townships in Effingham County, Illinois, USA. As of the 2020 census, its population was 444 and it contained 181 housing units.

== Geography ==
According to the 2021 census gazetteer files, West Township (T6N R4E) has a total area of 36.96 square miles (95.73 km^{2}), of which 36.92 square miles (95.62 km^{2}) (or 99.90%) is land and 0.04 square miles (0.10 km^{2}) (or 0.10%) is water.

=== Extinct towns ===
- Gilmore

=== Cemeteries ===
The township contains these five cemeteries: Beck William, Besing, Faulk, Kavanaugh and Mahon.

== Demographics ==
Historical population
Census	Pop.	Note	%±
1870	859		—
1880	1,047		21.9%
1890	901		−13.9%
1900	866		−3.9%
1910	765		−11.7%
1920	738		−3.5%
1930	646		−12.5%
1940	572		−11.5%
1950	563		−1.6%
1960	518		−8.0%
1970	424		−18.1%
1980	476		12.3%
1990	420		−11.8%
2000	444		5.7%
2010	467		5.2%
2020	444		−4.9%
U.S. Decennial Census

As of the 2020 census there were 444 people, 150 households, and 94 families residing in the township. The population density was 12.01 inhabitants per square mile (4.64/km^{2}). There were 181 housing units at an average density of 4.90 per square mile (1.89/km^{2}). The racial makeup of the township was 97.07% White, 0.90% African American, 0.00% Native American, 0.23% Asian, 0.00% Pacific Islander, 0.45% from other races, and 1.35% from two or more races. Hispanic or Latino of any race were 0.45% of the population.

There were 150 households, out of which 23.30% had children under the age of 18 living with them, 62.67% were married couples living together, 0.00% had a female householder with no spouse present, and 37.33% were non-families. 20.70% of all households were made up of individuals, and 0.00% had someone living alone who was 65 years of age or older. The average household size was 2.90 and the average family size was 3.77.

The township's age distribution consisted of 22.0% under the age of 18, 11.2% from 18 to 24, 10.8% from 25 to 44, 35.4% from 45 to 64, and 20.6% who were 65 years of age or older. The median age was 49.4 years. For every 100 females, there were 100.9 males. For every 100 females age 18 and over, there were 116.1 males.

The median income for a household in the township was $87,500, and the median income for a family was $96,071. Males had a median income of $55,536 versus $28,333 for females. The per capita income for the township was $29,736. About 0.0% of families and 1.3% of the population were below the poverty line, including 0.0% of those under age 18 and 0.0% of those age 65 or over.

== School districts ==
- Altamont Community Unit School District 10
- Effingham Community Unit School District 40
- St Elmo Community Unit School District 202

== Political districts ==
- Illinois' 19th congressional district
- Illinois State House District 110; Blaine Wilhour (R), Beecher City, IL
- Illinois State Senate District 55; Jason Plummer (R), Vandalia, IL
- Effingham County Board District G (Doug McCain (D), elected 2024; term expires 2028)
- West Township elected officials are: Township Supervisor, Scott A. Beal (R); Town Clerk, Iris Ashbaugh (R); Township Highway Commissioner, Mel Stuemke (R); Township Trustees: Wendell Alwardt (R), Mark Holland (I), Michael Runge (R), Bradley Suckow (R). All seven of these officials were re-elected April 1, 2025. Their new term of office begins May 19, 2025, and goes through May 21, 2029.
