= Dieterich, Illinois =

- Village
- Location of Dieterich in Effingham County, Illinois.
- Coordinates: 39°03′42″N 88°22′35″W
- Country: United States
- State: Illinois
- County: Effingham

Area
  - Total: 1.37 sq mi (3.54 km^{2})
  - Land: 1.37 sq mi (3.54 km^{2})
  - Water: 0 sq mi (0.00 km^{2})
- Elevation: 591 ft (180 m)

Population (2020)
  - Total: 890
  - Density: 651.6/sq mi (251.57/km^{2})
- Time zone: UTC-6 (CST)
  - Summer (DST): UTC-5 (CDT)
- ZIP code: 62424
- Area code: 217
- FIPS code: 17-19915
- GNIS ID: 2398723
- Website: www.dieterichillinois.com

Dieterich is a village in Effingham County, Illinois, United States. The population was 890 at the 2020 census. Dieterich is part of the Effingham, IL Micropolitan Statistical Area.

== History ==
Dieterich was laid out in 1880 when the railroad was extended to that point. The village was named for its founder, Michael Dieterich. A post office has been in operation at Dieterich since 1881.

== Geography ==
Dieterich is located in eastern Effingham County and Illinois Route 33 passes through the village, leading northwest 10 miles (16 km) to Effingham and southeast 13 miles (21 km) to Newton.

According to the 2021 census gazetteer files, Dieterich has a total area of 1.37 square miles (3.55 km^{2}), all land.

== Demographics ==
Historical population
Census	Pop.	Note	%±
1900	382		—
1910	493		29.1%
1920	522		5.9%
1930	488		−6.5%
1940	477		−2.3%
1950	500		4.8%
1960	591		18.2%
1970	532		−10.0%
1980	633		19.0%
1990	568		−10.3%
2000	591		4.0%
2010	617		4.4%
2020	890		44.2%
U.S. Decennial Census

As of the 2020 census there were 890 people, 325 households, and 209 families residing in the village. The population density was 651.54 inhabitants per square mile (251.56/km^{2}). There were 348 housing units at an average density of 254.76 per square mile (98.36/km^{2}). The racial makeup of the village was 96.40% White, 0.45% African American, 0.00% Native American, 0.79% Asian, 0.00% Pacific Islander, 0.34% from other races, and 2.02% from two or more races. Hispanic or Latino of any race were 1.91% of the population.

There were 325 households, out of which 35.1% had children under the age of 18 living with them, 55.08% were married couples living together, 7.08% had a female householder with no husband present, and 35.69% were non-families. 33.85% of all households were made up of individuals, and 10.15% had someone living alone who was 65 years of age or older. The average household size was 2.88 and the average family size was 2.23.

The village's age distribution consisted of 22.6% under the age of 18, 4.5% from 18 to 24, 32.4% from 25 to 44, 23.1% from 45 to 64, and 17.4% who were 65 years of age or older. The median age was 37.4 years. For every 100 females, there were 102.2 males. For every 100 females age 18 and over, there were 109.7 males.

The median income for a household in the village was $61,417, and the median income for a family was $90,417. Males had a median income of $49,911 versus $35,682 for females. The per capita income for the village was $33,319. About 1.9% of families and 6.3% of the population were below the poverty line, including 6.7% of those under age 18 and 4.0% of those age 65 or over.
