= Interstate 70 in Illinois =

Interstate Highway in Illinois, United States

Interstate 70
- I-70 highlighted in red

Route information
- Maintained by IDOT
- Length: 160 mi (260 km)
- NHS: Entire route

Major junctions
- West end: I-70 at the Missouri state line in Brooklyn
- IL 3 in Brooklyn; I-55 / I-64 / US 40 in East St. Louis; I-255 in Collinsville; US 40 at various locations; I-55 / I-270 in Troy; US 51 in Vandalia; I-57 near Effingham; IL 1 in Marshall
- East end: I-70 / US 40 at the Indiana state line near Marshall

Location
- Country: United States
- State: Illinois
- Counties: St. Clair, Madison, Bond, Fayette, Effingham, Cumberland, Clark

Highway system
- Interstate Highway System; Main; Auxiliary; Suffixed; Business; Future; Illinois State Highway System; Interstate; US; State; Tollways; Scenic
← IL 68	→ IL 70

Interstate 70 (I-70) is a part of the Interstate Highway System that travels from Cove Fort, Utah, to Baltimore, Maryland. In the US state of Illinois, the highway travels 160 miles (260 km) from the Missouri state line at the Mississippi River in Brooklyn east to the Indiana state line near Marshall. I-70, which travels in a generally east-northeast direction across the state parallel to and sometimes concurrent with U.S. Route 40 (US 40), connects St. Louis and the Metro East region of Illinois with the Indiana cities of Terre Haute and Indianapolis, as well as many small towns along the northern edge of Southern Illinois and the southern tier of the Central Illinois region. Within Metro East, I-70 has interchanges with I-64 in East St. Louis and I-55 near Troy. I-70 also has interchanges with the two Interstates that form St. Louis's beltway: I-255 near Collinsville and I-270 at the I-55 junction near Troy. East of the Metro East region, I-70 meets US 51 in Vandalia and both I-57 and US 45 in Effingham. Like all Interstate Highways, I-70 is a part of the National Highway System for its entire length in Illinois.

== Route description ==
I-70 enters Illinois from St. Louis by crossing the Mississippi River on the four-lane Stan Musial Veterans Memorial Bridge into the village of Brooklyn in St. Clair County. The first interchange is for Illinois Route 3 (IL 3), which heads south toward Cahokia; the Interstate has an interchange with I-64 toward Fairview Heights and I-55, which it joins and heads northeast. Previously, I-70 ran together with I-55 and I-64 across the Poplar Street Bridge downstream, crossing into East St. Louis; when it was realigned to the current routing, the section through Downtown was absorbed into another Interstate.

I-55/I-70 have an interchange with IL 203 before entering Madison County. The Interstate has a diamond interchange with IL 111 just north of Fairmont City and a partial one with Black Lane before the highway's interchange with I-255 west of Collinsville. I-55/I-70 curve northeast around Collinsville and leave the floodplain of the Mississippi River at the interchange with IL 157 (Bluff Road), where the highway reduces to four lanes. The Interstate passes between Collinsville and Maryville, which are both served by the next interchange with IL 159 (Vandalia Street/Maryville Road). US 40 leaves the freeway at a trumpet interchange southwest of Troy. I-55/I-70 curve to the north and meet IL 162 (Edwardsville Road) before they diverge at their interchange with I-270. The interchange, exit 20, is a full cloverleaf except for a flyover ramp for westbound I-70 to join southbound I-55. Westbound I-70's interchange is exit 15; the exits east of that are numbered as if I-70 had run along I-270 for the first few miles in Illinois.

I-70 meets IL 4 and IL 143 to the south and east of Marine before crossing Highland Silver Lake. US 40 rejoins I-70 near Pierron, and the two highways travel concurrently into Bond County, where they separate at Pocahontas. Here, I-70 crosses Shoal Creek. US 40 continues to closely parallel I-70 until the next interchange, which is a connector to US 40 southwest of Greenville. The two highways pass to the south of Greenville, which is also served via an interchange with IL 127. East of Mulberry Grove, I-70/US 40 cross to the north side of the east–west rail line and again closely parallel each other into Fayette County. I-70 passes along the northern edge of Vandalia, with access to the county seat of Fayette County provided by an interchange with US 40 on the west side and US 51 (Kennedy Boulevard) to the north. Just east of US 51, I-70 crosses the Kaskaskia River. I-70 crosses to the south side of both the rail line and US 40 (Cumberland Road) between Bluff City and Brownstown. The Interstate passes to the south of St. Elmo before entering Effingham County to the west of an interchange with IL 128 at Altamont.

Immediately after crossing the Little Wabash River, I-70 joins I-57 in a concurrency to pass around the west and north sides of Effingham. The two Interstates use I-57's exit sequence during the concurrency. I-57/I-70 have interchanges with Fayette Avenue, IL 32 and IL 33 (Keller Drive), and US 45 (Third Street) before diverging near Teutopolis. Just east of Montrose, I-70 enters Cumberland County, where the Interstate has one interchange with IL 130 (Haughton Highway) at Greenup, where the highway crosses the Embarras River. The Interstate continues into Clark County for an interchange with IL 49 north of Casey. I-70 crosses the North Fork Embarras River north of Martinsville, then has an interchange with IL 1 north of the county seat of Marshall. Northeast of Marshall, US 40 rejoins I-70 in a concurrency. The highways then cross the Indiana state line west of Terre Haute, Indiana, while closely paralleling the original alignment of US 40, Illiana Drive.

== History ==
In 1957, the first section of I-70 was built near Troy. However, initially, it was not signed as I-70. Instead, it was signed as US 66. In 1960, the expressway extended southwest to Collinsville. In a 1960 highway map, both I-55 and I-70 appeared for the first time. In 1961, I-70 also appeared between Effingham and Montrose. In 1962, both I-55 and I-70 further extended southwest to Exchange Avenue. Also, I-70 extended southwest from Effingham to IL 128 near Altamont. In 1964, it extended further southwest from IL 128 to US 40 in between Bluff City and Brownstown. In East St. Louis, I-55/I-70 extended southwest even further to directly connect to the Veterans Memorial Bridge. In 1965, an I-55/I-270 interchange was made. This would later be used for connecting I-70 eastward to Highland since 1966. That same year, I-70 extends west from US 40 near Bluff City to US 51 and then back to US 40. In 1968, the Poplar Street Bridge, a beam bridge, opened. That same year, the eastern portion of I-70 extended further west to IL 127 near Greenville. The western portion of I-70 extended east to Pocahontas. In 1969, both long sections were connected. In 1970, part of I-70 appeared nine miles (14 km) west from Indiana. In 1972, a final connection in Illinois (from Montrose to IL 1 north of Marshall) was made.

On February 9, 2014, the Stan Musial Veterans Memorial Bridge opened. After the opening, I-70 was moved further north from the Poplar Street Bridge.

== Exit list ==
County	Location	mi	km	Exit	Destinations	Notes
Mississippi River		0.00	0.00		I-70 west – Kansas City	Continuation into Missouri
Mississippi River		0.00	0.00	Stan Musial Veterans Memorial Bridge; Illinois-Missouri line		
St. Clair	Fairmont City	1.52– 1.74	2.45– 2.80	2	Fairmont City Boulevard to IL 3 – East St. Louis	
St. Clair	East St. Louis	2.42	3.89	3	I-64 east – Louisville	Eastbound exit and westbound entrance; I-64 exit 3B
St. Clair	East St. Louis	2.60	4.18	—	I-55 south / I-64 west / US 40 west / IL 3 south / Great River Road south – St. Louis	Western end of I-55/US 40/Great River Road concurrency; westbound exit and eastbound entrance; I-55 exit 3B
St. Clair	East St. Louis	2.75	4.43	3C	Exchange Avenue	Westbound exit and eastbound entrance; access to Emerson Park MetroLink station
St. Clair	Fairmont City	3.75	6.04	4	IL 203 (Collinsville Road) – Granite City, Fairmont City	Signed as 4A (south) and 4B (north) westbound
Madison	Fairmont City	6.09	9.80	6	IL 111 / Great River Road – Wood River, Washington Park	
Madison	Nameoki Township	8.63	13.89	9	Black Lane	Eastbound exit and westbound entrance
Madison	Collinsville Township	9.63	15.50	10	I-255 – Interstate 270, Memphis	I-255 exit 25
Madison	Collinsville Township	10.77	17.33	11	IL 157 (Bluff Road) – Collinsville, Edwardsville	
Madison	Maryville	14.33	23.06	15	IL 159 (Vandalia Street/Maryville Road) – Collinsville, Maryville	Signed as exits 15A (south) and 15B (north)
Madison	Troy	16.70	26.88	17	US 40 east – St. Jacob, Highland	Eastern end of US 40 concurrency
Madison	Troy	17.68	28.45	18	IL 162 (Edwardsville Road) – Troy	
Madison	Pin Oak Township	18.70	30.09	—	I-55 north – Chicago, Springfield	Eastern end of I-55 concurrency; I-55 exit 20A; eastbound exit and westbound entrance
Madison	Pin Oak Township	19.22	30.93	—	I-270 west – Kansas City	Eastern terminus of I-270; eastbound access to I-270 is via I-55 north
Madison	Marine Township	24.75	39.83	21	IL 4 – Staunton, Lebanon	
Madison	Marine Township	28.15	45.30	24	IL 143 – Marine, Highland	
Madison	Saline Township	34.40	55.36	30	US 40 west / IL 143 (Steiner Road) – Pierron, Highland	Western end of US 40 concurrency
Bond	Old Ripley Township	40.06	64.47	36	US 40 east (Pokey Road) – Pocahontas	Eastern end of US 40 concurrency
Bond	Central Township	45.51	73.24	41	To US 40 / Millersburg Road – Greenville	
Bond	Central Township	49.28	79.31	45	IL 127 – Greenville, Carlyle	
Bond	Pleasant Mound Township	56.32	90.64	52	Mulberry Grove Road – Mulberry Grove, Keyesport	
Fayette	Vandalia Township	64.75	104.21	61	US 40 – Vandalia	
Fayette	Vandalia	66.95	107.75	63	US 51 (Kennedy Boulevard) – Vandalia, Pana	
Fayette	Otego Township	71.98	115.84	68	US 40 (Cumberland Road) – Brownstown, Bluff City	
Fayette	St. Elmo	80.29	129.21	76	Interstate Drive – St. Elmo	
Effingham	Altamont	86.56	139.30	82	IL 128 north (Main Street) – Altamont	
Effingham	Summit Township	96.16	154.75	92	I-57 south – Memphis	Western end of I-57 concurrency; I-57 exit 157
Effingham	Effingham	98.13	157.92	159 (Note: Exits use I-57 exit numbers)	Fayette Avenue – Effingham	
Effingham	Effingham	99.16	159.58	160	IL 32 / IL 33 (Keller Drive)	Access to Lake Shelbyville and Convention Center
Effingham	Effingham	100.93	162.43	162	US 45 (3rd Street) – Sigel, Effingham	Access to Lake Land College and Kuthe Center
Effingham	Teutopolis Township	102.35	164.72	98	I-57 north – Chicago	Eastern end of I-57 concurrency; I-57 exit 163
Effingham	Montrose	109.38	176.03	105	Spring Creek Road – Montrose	
Cumberland	Greenup	123.05	198.03	119	IL 130 (Haughton Highway) – Greenup, Charleston	
Clark	Casey Township	133.51	214.86	129	IL 49 – Casey, Kansas	
Clark	Martinsville	139.60	224.66	136	Cleone Road – Martinsville	
Clark	Marshall Township	150.75	242.61	147	IL 1 – Marshall, Paris	
Clark	Wabash Township	157.97	254.23	154	US 40 west	Western end of US 40 concurrency
Clark	Wabash Township	159.75	257.09		I-70 east / US 40 east – Terre Haute, Indianapolis	Continuation into Indiana
1.000 mi = 1.609 km; 1.000 km = 0.621 mi: Concurrency terminus; Incomplete access

== Auxiliary routes ==
I-70 has one auxiliary route in Illinois:

- I-270: Forms the northern and western two-thirds of the beltway around Greater St. Louis (the eastern third is signed as I-255)

Interstate 70
Previous state: Missouri	Illinois	Next state: Indiana
