= Effingham County, Illinois =

County in Illinois, United States

- County
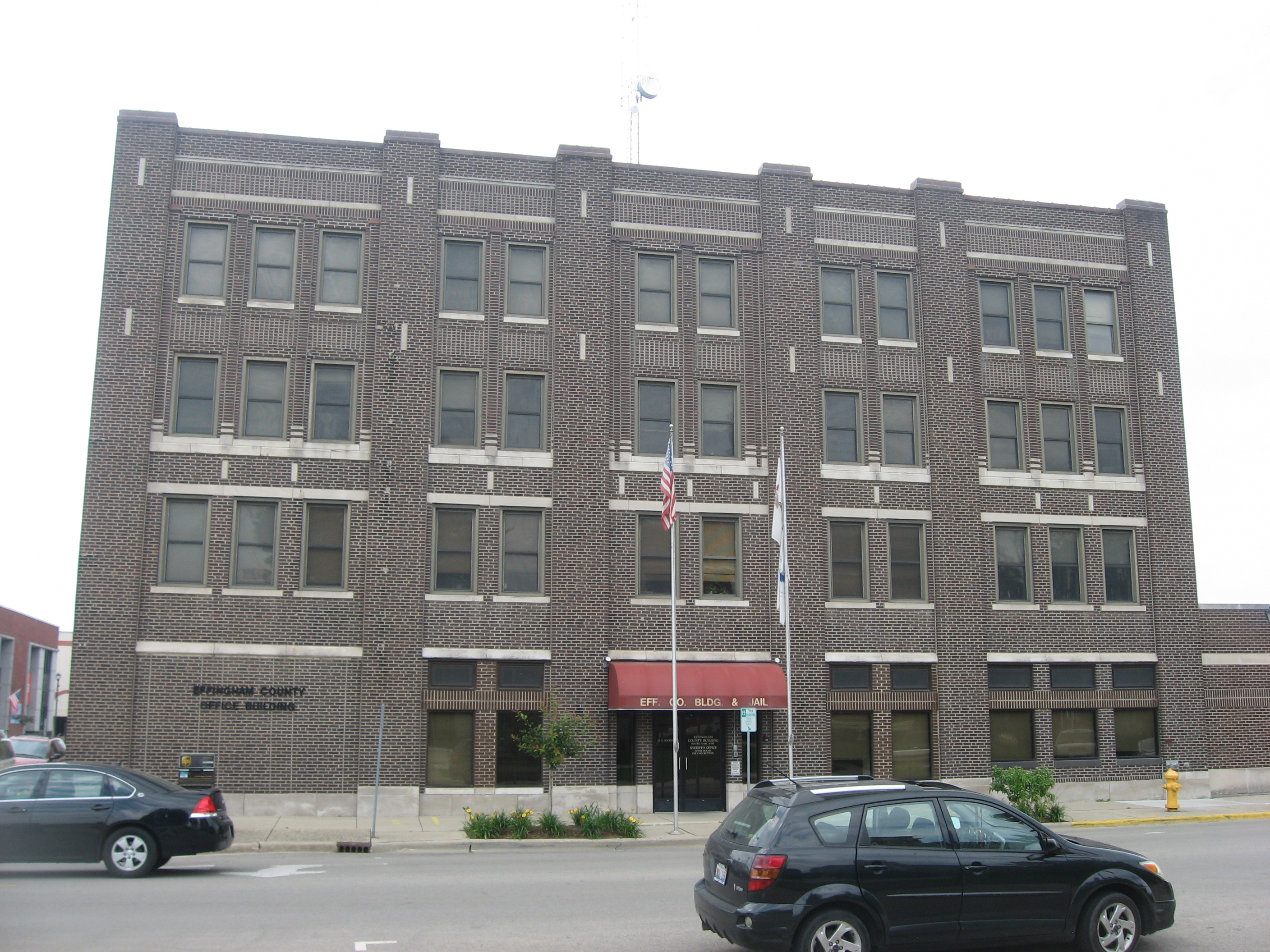
- Effingham County Government Center and Jail in Effingham

- Seal

- Location within the U.S. state of Illinois
- Coordinates: 39°04′N 88°35′W
- Country: United States
- State: Illinois
- Founded: 1831
- Named for: Thomas Howard, 3rd Earl of Effingham
- Seat: Effingham
- Largest city: Effingham

Area
  - Total: 480 sq mi (1,200 km^{2})
  - Land: 479 sq mi (1,240 km^{2})
  - Water: 1.2 sq mi (3.1 km^{2}) 0.3%

Population (2020)
  - Total: 34,668
  - Estimate (2025): 34,519 ▼
  - Density: 72.4/sq mi (27.9/km^{2})
- Time zone: UTC−6 (Central)
  - Summer (DST): UTC−5 (CDT)
- Congressional district: 12th
- Website: www.effinghamcountyil.gov

Effingham County is a county located in the south central part of the U.S. state Illinois. As of the 2020 census, the population was 34,668. Its county seat and largest city is Effingham. Some other cities in Effingham County, Illinois include Altamont, Teutopolis, Beecher City, Montrose, Dieterich, Shumway, Watson, Mason, and Edgewood. Effingham County comprises the Effingham, IL Micropolitan Statistical Area.

== History ==
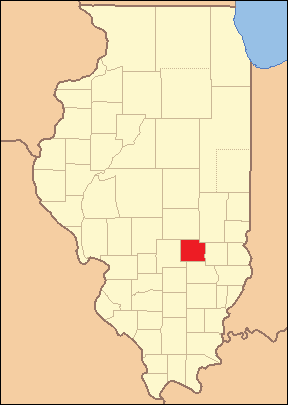
Effingham County at the time of its creation in 1831

Effingham County was formed in 1831 out of Fayette and Crawford counties. It may have been named after Thomas Howard, 3rd Earl of Effingham, who resigned his commission as general in the British army in 1775, refusing to serve in the war against the Colonies. The name is Anglo-Saxon for "Effa's house". New information suggests that the county was named after a surveyor who surveyed the area whose last name was Effingham. There is no written proof that the county was named after Lord Effingham.

== Government ==
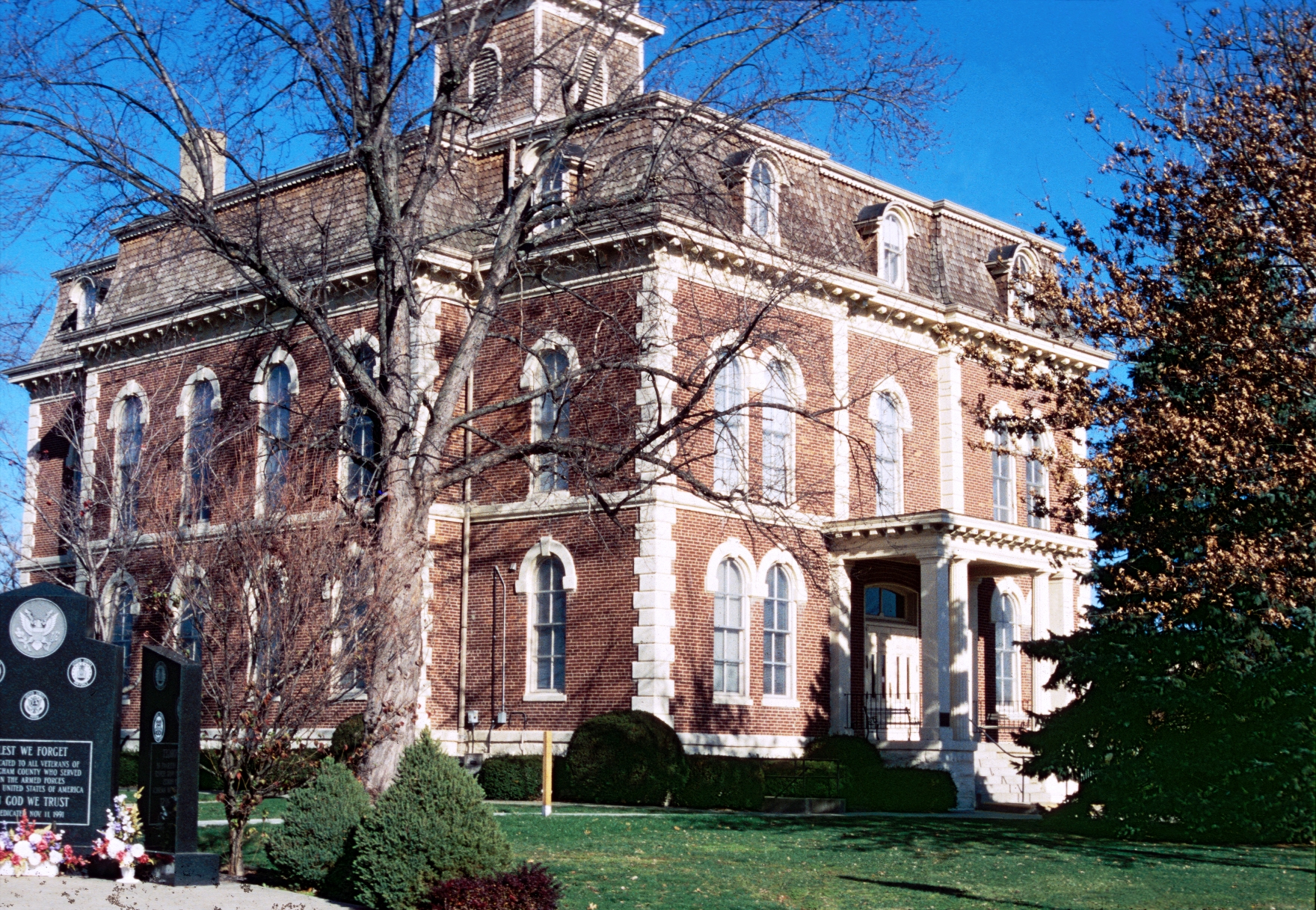
Effingham County Courthouse in Effingham

Effingham County is governed by a board of elected representatives. The Effingham County Board is the legislative body of County Government. It is composed of nine elected members, each representing a geographic district within the County. Each district is currently composed on average of just under 4000 residents. The districts are adjusted every 10 years after the national census information is published. The current Effingham County Board Chairman is Joshua Douthit (Republican) elected in 2022 from District B.

== Geography ==
According to the U.S. Census Bureau, the county has a total area of 480 square miles (1,200 km^{2}), of which 479 square miles (1,240 km^{2}) is land and 1.2 square miles (3.1 km^{2}) (0.3%) is water.

Just west of Effingham on Interstate 70 there is a 198-foot (60 m) white cross; 35,000 vehicles are estimated to pass the site each day. It is one of the world's tallest crosses, and took over 200 short tons (180 t) of steel to erect.

=== Climate and weather ===
Effingham, Illinois

Climate chart (precipitation, max. and min. temperature)
J	F	M	A	M	J	J	A	S	O	N	D
2.4 35 18	2.5 41 22	3.6 52 32	4.1 64 42	4.5 74 52	4.3 83 62	4.5 87 66	2.9 85 63	3 78 55	3 67 43	4.1 52 34	3.3 40 23
- █ Average max. and min. temperatures in °F
- █ Precipitation totals in inches
- Source: The Weather Channel
Metric conversion
J	F	M	A	M	J	J	A	S	O	N	D
60 2 −8	64 5 −6	92 11 0	104 18 6	113 23 11	108 28 17	115 31 19	74 29 17	77 26 13	75 19 6	103 11 1	83 4 −5
- █ Average max. and min. temperatures in °C
- █ Precipitation totals in mm

In recent years, average temperatures in the county seat of Effingham have ranged from a low of 18 °F (−8 °C) in January to a high of 87 °F (31 °C) in July, although a record low of −29 °F (−34 °C) was recorded in January 1915 and a record high of 111 °F (44 °C) was recorded in July 1954. Average monthly precipitation ranged from 2.38 inches (60 mm) in January to 4.51 inches (115 mm) in July.

=== Adjacent counties ===
- Cumberland County - northeast
- Jasper County - east
- Clay County - south
- Fayette County - west
- Shelby County - northwest

=== Major highways ===
- Interstate 57
- Interstate 70
- U.S. Route 40
- U.S. Route 45
- Illinois Route 32
- Illinois Route 33
- Illinois Route 37
- Illinois Route 128

=== Transit ===
- Effingham station
- List of intercity bus stops in Illinois

== Demographics ==
Historical population
Census	Pop.	Note	%±
1840	1,675		—
1850	3,799		126.8%
1860	7,816		105.7%
1870	15,653		100.3%
1880	18,920		20.9%
1890	19,358		2.3%
1900	20,465		5.7%
1910	20,055		−2.0%
1920	19,556		−2.5%
1930	19,013		−2.8%
1940	22,034		15.9%
1950	21,675		−1.6%
1960	23,107		6.6%
1970	24,608		6.5%
1980	30,944		25.7%
1990	31,704		2.5%
2000	34,264		8.1%
2010	34,242		−0.1%
2020	34,668		1.2%
2025 (est.)	34,519	▼	−0.4%
U.S. Decennial Census; 1790-1960 1900-1990; 1990-2000 2010-2013

2000 census age pyramid for Effingham County

=== 2020 census ===
As of the 2020 census, the county had a population of 34,668. The median age was 40.5 years, 23.3% of residents were under the age of 18, and 19.1% of residents were 65 years of age or older. For every 100 females there were 98.8 males, and for every 100 females age 18 and over there were 96.4 males age 18 and over.

The racial makeup of the county was 94.0% White, 0.4% Black or African American, 0.2% American Indian and Alaska Native, 0.7% Asian, fewer than 0.1% Native Hawaiian and Pacific Islander, 0.9% from some other race, and 3.7% from two or more races. Hispanic or Latino residents of any race comprised 2.5% of the population.

40.4% of residents lived in urban areas, while 59.6% lived in rural areas.

There were 14,117 households in the county, of which 29.0% had children under the age of 18 living in them. Of all households, 53.3% were married-couple households, 17.3% were households with a male householder and no spouse or partner present, and 23.1% were households with a female householder and no spouse or partner present. About 28.8% of all households were made up of individuals and 13.2% had someone living alone who was 65 years of age or older.

There were 15,314 housing units, of which 7.8% were vacant. Among occupied housing units, 76.7% were owner-occupied and 23.3% were renter-occupied. The homeowner vacancy rate was 1.4% and the rental vacancy rate was 7.9%.

=== Racial and ethnic composition ===
Effingham County County, Illinois – Racial and ethnic composition Note: the US Census treats Hispanic/Latino as an ethnic category. This table excludes Latinos from the racial categories and assigns them to a separate category. Hispanics/Latinos may be of any race.
Race / Ethnicity (NH = Non-Hispanic)	Pop 1980	Pop 1990	Pop 2000	Pop 2010	Pop 2020	% 1980	% 1990	% 2000	% 2010	% 2020
White alone (NH)	30,764	31,437	33,658	33,155	32,361	99.42%	99.16%	98.23%	96.83%	93.35%
Black or African American alone (NH)	17	12	55	76	151	0.05%	0.04%	0.16%	0.22%	0.44%
Native American or Alaska Native alone (NH)	27	43	49	24	36	0.09%	0.14%	0.14%	0.07%	0.10%
Asian alone (NH)	30	90	108	147	246	0.10%	0.28%	0.32%	0.43%	0.71%
Native Hawaiian or Pacific Islander alone (NH)	x	x	4	7	6	x	x	0.01%	0.02%	0.02%
Other race alone (NH)	15	1	7	13	45	0.05%	0.00%	0.02%	0.04%	0.13%
Mixed race or Multiracial (NH)	x	x	131	223	951	x	x	0.38%	0.65%	2.74%
Hispanic or Latino (any race)	91	121	252	597	872	0.29%	0.38%	0.74%	1.74%	2.52%
Total	30,944	31,704	34,264	34,242	34,668	100.00%	100.00%	100.00%	100.00%	100.00%

=== 2010 census ===
As of the 2010 United States census, there were 34,242 people, 13,515 households, and 9,302 families residing in the county. The population density was 71.5 inhabitants per square mile (27.6/km^{2}). There were 14,570 housing units at an average density of 30.4 per square mile (11.7/km^{2}). The racial makeup of the county was 97.6% white, 0.4% Asian, 0.2% black or African American, 0.1% American Indian, 0.8% from other races, and 0.8% from two or more races. Those of Hispanic or Latino origin made up 1.7% of the population. In terms of ancestry, 41.6% were German, 10.0% were Irish, 9.3% were American, and 8.8% were English.

Of the 13,515 households, 32.7% had children under the age of 18 living with them, 54.9% were married couples living together, 9.5% had a female householder with no husband present, 31.2% were non-families, and 26.9% of all households were made up of individuals. The average household size was 2.50 and the average family size was 3.03. The median age was 39.2 years.

The median income for a household in the county was $49,509 and the median income for a family was $61,373. Males had a median income of $40,951 versus $28,209 for females. The per capita income for the county was $24,843. About 7.8% of families and 10.5% of the population were below the poverty line, including 14.1% of those under age 18 and 7.4% of those age 65 or over.

== Communities ==
=== Cities ===
- Altamont
- Effingham (seat)

=== Town ===
- Mason

=== Villages ===
- Beecher City
- Dieterich
- Edgewood
- Montrose
- Shumway
- Teutopolis
- Watson

=== Townships ===
Effingham County is divided into fifteen townships:

- Banner
- Bishop
- Douglas
- Jackson
- Liberty
- Lucas
- Mason
- Moccasin
- Mound
- St. Francis
- Summit
- Teutopolis
- Union
- Watson
- West

=== Unincorporated communities ===
- Dexter
- Elliottstown
- Funkhouser
- Gilmore
- Heartville
- Keptown
- Moccasin

== Politics ==
In its early years Effingham County was owing to its anti-Civil War German-American population powerfully Democratic. Until Woodrow Wilson’s harsh policies towards Germany following World War I drove many voters to the GOP’s Warren G. Harding, it had voted an absolute majority to the Democratic presidential candidate in every election since the county’s formation. Opposition to the New Deal caused a considerable swing away from Franklin D. Roosevelt in 1936, and combined with local opposition to Roosevelt’s war policies in 1940 to cause FDR to only win the county by forty-seven votes from Wendell Willkie.

Since that election, the county has voted Republican in every election except 1948 and 1964, and no Democrat since Jimmy Carter in 1976 has reached 35 percent of the county’s vote. Currently Effingham County is one of Illinois’ most Republican counties, rivalled by a number of southern counties like Edwards. In the 2008 U.S. presidential election, John McCain carried the county by a 36% margin over Barack Obama, making it McCain's strongest county in the state, with Obama carrying his home state by a 25.1% margin over McCain.

Currently all elected officials holding major offices in Effingham County are Republican with 8 of 9 elected County Board Representatives being Republican.

United States presidential election results for Effingham County, Illinois
Year	Republican		Democratic		Third party(ies)	
Year	No.	%	No.	%	No.	%
1892	1,472	32.92%	2,744	61.37%	255	5.70%
1896	1,895	38.57%	2,953	60.11%	65	1.32%
1900	1,853	37.95%	2,979	61.01%	51	1.04%
1904	1,863	42.68%	2,303	52.76%	199	4.56%
1908	1,877	38.86%	2,826	58.51%	127	2.63%
1912	1,002	23.25%	2,575	59.76%	732	16.99%
1916	3,207	40.36%	4,529	57.00%	210	2.64%
1920	4,176	57.47%	2,985	41.08%	106	1.46%
1924	3,159	39.18%	3,814	47.30%	1,090	13.52%
1928	3,882	47.26%	4,239	51.61%	93	1.13%
1932	2,933	30.65%	6,503	67.96%	133	1.39%
1936	4,293	40.57%	6,030	56.98%	260	2.46%
1940	5,941	49.48%	5,988	49.88%	77	0.64%
1944	5,441	53.77%	4,587	45.33%	91	0.90%
1948	4,823	48.92%	4,940	50.11%	96	0.97%
1952	6,530	57.79%	4,745	41.99%	25	0.22%
1956	6,904	60.67%	4,455	39.15%	21	0.18%
1960	6,410	53.01%	5,676	46.94%	6	0.05%
1964	5,044	42.65%	6,782	57.35%	0	0.00%
1968	6,698	55.95%	4,496	37.55%	778	6.50%
1972	8,752	66.34%	4,431	33.59%	10	0.08%
1976	7,194	53.72%	5,952	44.45%	245	1.83%
1980	9,104	65.93%	4,229	30.63%	475	3.44%
1984	9,617	71.22%	3,841	28.44%	46	0.34%
1988	8,431	64.53%	4,553	34.85%	82	0.63%
1992	6,329	42.25%	5,221	34.85%	3,431	22.90%
1996	7,696	54.18%	4,825	33.97%	1,683	11.85%
2000	9,855	68.04%	4,225	29.17%	405	2.80%
2004	11,774	72.33%	4,388	26.96%	116	0.71%
2008	11,323	67.08%	5,262	31.17%	295	1.75%
2012	12,501	75.25%	3,861	23.24%	251	1.51%
2016	13,635	77.43%	3,083	17.51%	891	5.06%
2020	15,006	78.64%	3,716	19.47%	361	1.89%
2024	15,124	78.96%	3,617	18.88%	413	2.16%

== See also ==
- National Register of Historic Places listings in Effingham County, Illinois
