= Moccasin, Illinois =

- Unincorporated community
- Location within Illinois Location within the United States
- Coordinates: 39°08′50″N 88°45′28″W
- Country: United States
- State: Illinois
- County: Effingham
- Elevation: 610 ft (190 m)
- Time zone: UTC-6 (Central (CST))
  - Summer (DST): UTC-5 (CDT)
- Area code: 217
- GNIS feature ID: 413693

Moccasin is an unincorporated community in Effingham County, in the U.S. state of Illinois.

== History ==
A post office called Moccasin was established in 1862, and remained in operation until 1943. The community was named for the Indian moccasin. Joseph P. Condo (1848–1923), Illinois state representative, lived in Moccasin.
