= Saline Township, Madison County, Illinois =

Saline Township
- Township
- Location of Illinois in the United States
- Coordinates: 38°47′12″N 89°39′23″W
- Country: United States
- State: Illinois
- County: Madison
- Settled: November 2, 1875

Government
  - Mayor: Alvin Steiner

Area
  - Total: 35.66 sq mi (92.4 km^{2})
  - Land: 34.39 sq mi (89.1 km^{2})
  - Water: 1.27 sq mi (3.3 km^{2})
- Elevation: 499 ft (152 m)

Population (2010)
  - Estimate (2016): 6,268
  - Density: 183.8/sq mi (71.0/km^{2})
- Time zone: UTC-6 (CST)
  - Summer (DST): UTC-5 (CDT)
- FIPS code: 17-119-67275

Saline Township is located in Madison County, Illinois, in the United States. As of the 2010 census, its population was 6,321 and it contained 2,486 housing units. Saline Township covers the northern part of Highland, most of Grantfork, and the Madison County portion of Pierron. The government offices are in Woodcrest Drive in Highland.

== History ==
Saline Township was named from the salinity of a salt well.

== Geography ==
According to the 2010 census, the township has a total area of 35.66 square miles (92.4 km^{2}), of which 34.39 square miles (89.1 km^{2}) (or 96.44%) is land and 1.27 square miles (3.3 km^{2}) (or 3.56%) is water.

== Demographics ==
Historical population
Census	Pop.	Note	%±
2016 (est.)	6,268
U.S. Decennial Census
