= Altamont, Illinois =

Altamont
- City
- Motto: "Small enough to care large enough to serve."
- Location of Altamont in Effingham County, Illinois.
- Coordinates: 39°03′22″N 88°45′05″W
- Country: United States
- State: Illinois
- County: Effingham

Government
  - Mayor: Dan Milleville

Area
  - Total: 1.49 sq mi (3.86 km^{2})
  - Land: 1.49 sq mi (3.86 km^{2})
  - Water: 0 sq mi (0.00 km^{2})
- Elevation: 617 ft (188 m)

Population (2020)
  - Total: 2,216
  - Density: 1,488.5/sq mi (574.71/km^{2})
- Time zone: UTC-6 (CST)
  - Summer (DST): UTC-5 (CDT)
- ZIP code: 62411
- Area code: 618
- FIPS code: 17-01049
- GNIS feature ID: 2393932
- Website: www.altamontil.net

Altamont is a city in Effingham County, Illinois, United States. The population was 2,216 at the 2020 census. Altamont is part of the Effingham, Illinois Micropolitan Statistical Area.

== History ==
On August 8, 1872, Altamont adopted the village form of government, with a mayor and four council members. On April 16, 1901, the voters adopted a city form of government and became the City of Altamont.

== Geography ==
According to the 2021 census gazetteer files, Altamont has a total area of 1.49 square miles (3.86 km^{2}), all land.

== Demographics ==
Historical population
Census	Pop.	Note	%±
1880	654		—
1890	1,044		59.6%
1900	1,335		27.9%
1910	1,328		−0.5%
1920	1,352		1.8%
1930	1,225		−9.4%
1940	2,111		72.3%
1950	1,580		−25.2%
1960	1,656		4.8%
1970	1,929		16.5%
1980	2,389		23.8%
1990	2,296		−3.9%
2000	2,283		−0.6%
2010	2,319		1.6%
2020	2,216		−4.4%
U.S. Decennial Census

=== 2020 census ===
As of the 2020 census, there were 2,216 people and 921 households in Altamont. There were 621 families residing in the city. The population density was 1,488.25 inhabitants per square mile (574.62/km^{2}). There were 1,001 housing units at an average density of 672.26 per square mile (259.56/km^{2}).

The median age was 39.6 years. 25.3% of residents were under the age of 18 and 20.8% were 65 years of age or older. For every 100 females there were 89.2 males, and for every 100 females age 18 and over there were 81.9 males age 18 and over.

0.0% of residents lived in urban areas, while 100.0% lived in rural areas.

Of the city's households, 30.4% had children under the age of 18 living in them. Of all households, 44.0% were married-couple households, 17.2% were households with a male householder and no spouse or partner present, and 30.9% were households with a female householder and no spouse or partner present. About 33.4% of all households were made up of individuals, and 17.8% had someone living alone who was 65 years of age or older. The average household size was 2.67 and the average family size was 2.16.

There were 1,001 housing units, of which 8.0% were vacant. The homeowner vacancy rate was 2.4% and the rental vacancy rate was 10.0%.

Racial composition as of the 2020 census
Race	Number	Percent
White	2,106	95.0%
Black or African American	4	0.2%
American Indian and Alaska Native	9	0.4%
Asian	11	0.5%
Native Hawaiian and Other Pacific Islander	0	0.0%
Some other race	13	0.6%
Two or more races	73	3.3%
Hispanic or Latino (of any race)	35	1.6%

=== Income and poverty ===
The median income for a household in the city was $48,359, and the median income for a family was $67,465. Males had a median income of $37,773 versus $26,037 for females. The per capita income for the city was $27,534. About 7.7% of families and 12.5% of the population were below the poverty line, including 17.9% of those under age 18 and 8.7% of those age 65 or over.

== Arts and culture ==
=== Points of interest ===
Altamont is home to the Effingham County Fairgrounds, at which the Effingham County Fair has been held annually in the first week of August since 1945. Each year the Effingham County Fair hosts nationally known country singers, a touring rodeo, two ITPA truck and tractor pulls, a queen pageant, a talent show, Standardbred and Thoroughbred races, and a demolition derby. The fairgrounds were once host to the Illinois High School rodeo finals, and currently host the Mill Road Thresherman's gathering and the annual Schützenfest.

The Dr. Charles M. Wright House is a Victorian style home built in 1889 by Dr. C.M. Wright on a 5-acre (20,000 m^{2}) tract on upper North Main Street, where there had been a two-story frame house that was the Wright family home. Wright planned the house himself but the final design (with Wright's approval) was by Edwardsville, Illinois, architect, C. H. Spilman. The builder was Charles Hanker of Toledo, Illinois, for a $17,965 with the owner furnishing the materials. The total cost, not including furnishings, was approximately $35,000. The house has 18 furnished rooms, including seven bedrooms. On May 8, 1986, the house was put on the National Register of Historic Places.

Ballard Nature Center is a 217 acres (0.9 km^{2}) nature preserve and educational center located east of Altamont. It includes 107 acres (0.4 km^{2}) of woodland, 15 acres (61,000 m^{2}) of restored prairie, 10 acres (40,000 m^{2}) of shallow water wetlands and 85 acres (340,000 m^{2}) of agricultural land. Ernie Ballard donated 210 acres (0.8 km^{2}) for the site of a nature center and the funds to construct a visitor center. He developed a non-profit 501 (C) 3 foundation, in August 1999, to oversee development and management of the center. Construction of the log building began in October 1999. It opened to the public in July 2000. In 2014, the Glen Mathias family donated another 7 acres of land adjacent to the original 210 acres.

== Parks and recreation ==
Altamont has three parks. Gilbert Park, named after Ray Gilbert, Mayor of Altamont from 1971 to 1979, is the largest of Altamont's parks. It has four baseball/softball diamonds, an indoor batting cage, playground equipment and soccer field, and a nine-hole disc golf course.

Schmidt Park has picnic pavilions and playground equipment.

W.C. Klitzing Memorial Heritage Park, often called simply Heritage Park and known to some as "The Train Park," is named after former mayor, school board member, and City Attorney Walter C. Klitzing. It has play equipment, a skateboard area, several covered picnic tables, a basketball court, and restrooms.

There is also "The Triangle," a garden and pavilion space between North Second Street, North Main Street, and West Washington Avenue in downtown Altamont. The Triangle features benches, flower beds, a flagpole, and a covered pavilion which often hosts bake sales and cookouts for community organizations to host fundraisers.

== Government ==
The City of Altamont is governed by an elected mayor and city council of four members. Most recent mayoral and city council elections were in April 2023, those terms all expire in 2027. Currently, Mike Walker is mayor, and the council members are Terry White, Dan Millville, Jason Rippetoe, and Tayler Polk.

== Education ==
Altamont Grade School is a public grade school serving grades K-8. Enrollment at the beginning of 2011 was 546. Its sports teams are the Wildcats.

Altamont Community High School is a public high school. The main section of the current building was constructed in the 1950s, and students first occupied the building in 1954. Enrollment at the beginning of 2011 was 285. Its sports teams are the Indians and Lady Indians.

Altamont Grade School and Altamont High School are part of Altamont Community Unit School District #10. Ms. Casey Adam is the superintendent of schools. The High School athletics compete in the National Trail Conference.

Altamont Lutheran Interparish School (ALIS) is a private school serving grades K-8. Robinette Flach is the school Principal. The cornerstone reads "Immanuel Lutheran School 1959", but the school is now a joint effort of Immanuel, Bethlehem, St. Paul (Blue Point) and Zion Lutheran Churches. Its sports teams are the Rockets.

In 1905, a school building was erected behind Immanuel. Later, in 1928, a school building was purchased for $250, rebuilt, and added to the existing school for a second room. The cornerstone for a new school was laid on July 26, 1959. This building was dedicated on Sunday, January 31, 1960. The cost, including land, was $200,000. The final payment was made in 1966.

In early 1973, St. Paul Blue Point and Immanuel, Altamont formed Altamont Lutheran Interparish School. St. Paul paid $40,000 to add two rooms. The school at St. Paul was discontinued and the students were taken to the Interparish School. St. Paul's school had been in use since 1910.

Zion Lutheran School was organized in 1887. In 1922, the Zion Church building was dedicated so the school was now used exclusively for school classes. In 1931, the Ladies Aid started a fund for a new school. The new school was dedicated in 1938, with electricity, which was also installed in the parsonage at that time. The school closed for a time but reopened in 1956 with Gladys Heiser as teacher. In 1972, Zion school closed and children began attending Altamont Lutheran Interparish School. Zion became a corporate member of ALIS in 1989.

In 1861, the congregation of Bethlehem Lutheran Church erected a church and school building, used until 1867 when the present church was built. In 1873, the school had 23 students. In 1940, English began to be used. The teaching of German ended in 1954.

In December 1958 Bethlehem school building failed a fire inspection. Voters improved the school to keep it open. In 1960 it was decided to build a new school. In 1961, enrollment showed 51 students and the congregation built a parish hall with the school.

On August 26, 1962, Bethlehem Congregation dedicated three classrooms, office, restrooms, parish hall/gymnasium and kitchen. In May 1987, Bethlehem Lutheran School closed and students began attending ALIS in August. In 1988, Bethlehem became a member of ALIS.

== Infrastructure ==
=== Transportation ===
Altamont is served by Interstate 70, U.S. Route 40, and Illinois Route 128, all of which pass through the city limits. What is now U.S. Route 40 was once known as the National Road.

Amtrak service to Chicago and New Orleans and all points in between can be accessed in Effingham, 12 miles (19 km) to the east.

== Community ==
Altamont Lions Club has been active since 1938. The Lions operate the youth basketball and soccer programs, have an annual fishing rodeo, sponsor a golf tournament, participate in Lions International Candy Day each fall, sponsor local youth for trips abroad and within the U.S., and contribute toward Ballard Nature Center and local parks.

The Altamont Garden Club has planted and cared for many areas around town, as well as pays for and waters over thirty hanging baskets of flowers throughout downtown the spring and summer months. The Garden Club also installed a few dozen lamp posts along the walking path in Schmidt Park.
