= Beecher City, Illinois =

- Village
- Location of Beecher City in Effingham County, Illinois.
- Coordinates: 39°11′12″N 88°47′16″W
- Country: United States
- State: Illinois
- County: Effingham

Area
  - Total: 0.90 sq mi (2.32 km^{2})
  - Land: 0.90 sq mi (2.32 km^{2})
  - Water: 0 sq mi (0.00 km^{2})
- Elevation: 614 ft (187 m)

Population (2020)
  - Total: 428
  - Density: 478.0/sq mi (184.55/km^{2})
- Time zone: UTC-6 (CST)
  - Summer (DST): UTC-5 (CDT)
- ZIP code: 62414
- Area code: 618
- FIPS code: 17-04598
- GNIS ID: 2398067

Beecher City is a village in Effingham County, Illinois, United States. Beecher City is part of the Effingham, Illinois Micropolitan Statistical Area. The population was 428 at the 2020 census. Beecher City was founded in 1872.

== Geography ==
Beecher City is located in northwestern Effingham County. Illinois Route 33 passes through the village, leading east 15 miles (24 km) to Effingham.

According to the 2021 census gazetteer files, Beecher City has a total area of 0.90 square miles (2.33 km^{2}), all land.

The village is home to the Beecher City Unit 20 School District. The district has a junior/senior high school as well as a grade school serving grades K-6 located in the town. Recently the neighboring town of Shumway housed a grade school for grades K-2, but it closed down at the start of the 2010–2011 school year.The village has a post office, bank, and a village paper. It was also home to a popular gas station, known as 'the station,' which has since closed. This small village is also complete with a volunteer fire department and several churches.

== Demographics ==
Historical population
Census	Pop.	Note	%±
1880	70		—
1900	340		—
1910	355		4.4%
1920	328		−7.6%
1930	321		−2.1%
1940	506		57.6%
1950	437		−13.6%
1960	452		3.4%
1970	466		3.1%
1980	492		5.6%
1990	437		−11.2%
2000	493		12.8%
2010	463		−6.1%
2020	428		−7.6%
U.S. Decennial Census

As of the 2020 census, there were 428 people, 171 households, and 94 families residing in the village. The population density was 478.21 inhabitants per square mile (184.64/km^{2}). There were 204 housing units at an average density of 227.93 per square mile (88.00/km^{2}). The racial makeup of the village was 90.89% White, 0.23% African American, 0.47% Native American, 0.00% Asian, 0.23% Pacific Islander, 0.00% from other races, and 8.18% from two or more races. Hispanic or Latino of any race were 2.34% of the population.

There were 171 households, out of which 28.1% had children under the age of 18 living with them, 29.82% were married couples living together, 8.77% had a female householder with no husband present, and 45.03% were non-families. 36.26% of all households were made up of individuals, and 17.54% had someone living alone who was 65 years of age or older. The average household size was 2.70 and the average family size was 2.18.

The village's age distribution consisted of 21.4% under the age of 18, 11.0% from 18 to 24, 23.4% from 25 to 44, 29.2% from 45 to 64, and 15.0% who were 65 years of age or older. The median age was 40.9 years. For every 100 females, there were 108.4 males. For every 100 females age 18 and over, there were 95.3 males.

The median income for a household in the village was $42,679, and the median income for a family was $53,750. Males had a median income of $35,000 versus $23,750 for females. The per capita income for the village was $27,677. About 17.0% of families and 21.0% of the population were below the poverty line, including 32.9% of those under age 18 and 25.0% of those age 65 or over.

== Education ==
Beecher City High School made the Chicago Sun-Times "Top 100 High Schools in Illinois" in 2009 and 2010.
