= U.S. Route 40 in Illinois =

US Highway section within the state of Illinois

U.S. Route 40
- National Road
- US 40 highlighted in red

Route information
- Maintained by IDOT
- Length: 159.8 mi (257.2 km)
- Existed: 1926–present
- Tourist routes: Historic National Road

Major junctions
- West end: I-55 / I-64 / US 40 in East St. Louis
- I-70 in East St. Louis; I-255 in Collinsville; I-70 near Highland; I-70 near Stubblefield; I-70 in Vandalia; US 51 in Vandalia; I-70 near Brownstown; US 45 in Effingham; IL 1 in Marshall; I-70 in Wabash Township
- East end: I-70 / US 40 near State Line, IN

Location
- Country: United States
- State: Illinois
- Counties: St. Clair, Madison, Bond, Fayette, Effingham, Cumberland, Clark

Highway system
- United States Numbered Highway System; List; Special; Divided; Illinois State Highway System; Interstate; US; State; Tollways; Scenic
← IL 39	→ IL 40
← IL 10	IL 11	→ US 12

U.S. Route 40 (US 40) runs east–west across south central Illinois for 159.8 miles (257.2 km). US 40 enters the state from Missouri across the Poplar Street Bridge over the Mississippi River at East St. Louis concurrent with Interstate 55 (I-55) and I-64 and exits just south of State Line, Indiana, running concurrently with I-70. For the majority of its route through Illinois, US 40 follows the National Road, including the route's initial western terminus at Vandalia.

For nearly its entire route, US 40 is two-lane and rural, with the exception of portions in and around major towns and cities. For its entire length, US 40 closely aligns with I-70. Not only does the route intersect with the Interstate six times, but also has three concurrencies with the highway; both highways exit into Indiana on the same road.

== Route description ==
=== East St. Louis to Highland ===
Starting from the Poplar Street Bridge, US 40, as well as I-55 and I-64, enters East St. Louis. Just east of the bridge, the three routes run concurrently with IL 3 as well as the Great River Road. After a series of interchanges, both I-64 and IL 3 branches off while I-70 joins the I-55/US 40 concurrencies. From then on, they meet IL 203 at a combination interchange, IL 111 at a diamond interchange, Black Lane at an incomplete interchange, I-255 at another combination interchange, IL 157 at a parclo interchange, and IL 159 at a cloverleaf interchange. At a trumpet interchange 17 miles (27 km) from the Missouri state line, US 40 branches off from I-55 and I-70. From then on, it meets IL 162 and then IL 4 at a one-quadrant interchange.

=== Highland to Vandalia ===
Starting at Highland, US 40 runs concurrently with IL 143. Then, at the roundabout, IL 160 joins the concurrency. IL 160 soon leaves the concurrency around a mile east of the roundabout. IL 143 then also leaves US 40. US 40 then joins I-70 again from exit 30 to the next exit, exit 36. After US 40 leaves I-70, it parallels I-70 for most of the length through Illinois. At a parclo interchange on exit 41 for I-70, US 40 turns south and then east from the northern part of the interchange. It then meets IL 127 at Greenville, IL 140 east of Mulberry Grove, and I-70 at another diamond interchange (exit 61).

=== Vandalia to Indiana state line ===
In Vandalia, IL 185 joins US 40 eastward. Then, the two routes run concurrently with US 51 all the way to downtown. US 51 then leaves the concurrency of two routes. Then, IL 185 also leaves from US 40 just west of another diamond interchange of I-70 (exit 68). IL 128 joins US 40 up to Altamont where IL 128 branches south to I-70. As US 40 reaches Effingham, it briefly bends north until it reaches the intersection of US 40/IL 32/IL 33. At that point, only IL 33 carries on eastward with US 40. At downtown Effingham, US 45 briefly joins from the south and then leaves northward. Soon, IL 33 branches off eastward. From then on, US 40 intersects IL 130, IL 49, and IL 1. US 40 then joins I-70 at another diamond interchange for the third time as the two are about to enter Indiana.

== History ==
Up until 1935, Illinois Route 11 (IL 11) roughly followed the old alignment of US 40 from St. Louis to near Terre Haute, Indiana. After 1935, IL 11 was decommissioned. But in the mid-1940s, IL 11 was reused after US 40 was realigned south of downtown Greenville and Mulberry Grove, Illinois. In 1947, IL 11 was extended to Vandalia via US 40's old alignment after US 40 bypassed Hagarstown. It followed a part of the original alignment of US 40 between IL 127 in Greenville and US 51 in Vandalia. By 1948, IL 11 was partially replaced by US 40 Alternate; later acquired by IL 140 in 1967.

== Major intersections ==
County	Location	mi	km	Exit	Destinations	Notes
Mississippi River		0.0	0.0		I-55 south / I-64 west / US 40 west to I-44 – St. Louis, Tulsa, Memphis, Kansas City	Continuation into Missouri
Mississippi River		0.0– 0.3	0.0– 0.48	Poplar Street Bridge		
St. Clair	East St. Louis	0.6	0.97	1	IL 3 south (Mississippi Avenue) / Great River Road south – Cahokia	Western end of IL 3/GRR concurrency
St. Clair	East St. Louis	0.9	1.4	—	13th Street/Tudor Avenue	Entrance ramp from Piggott Avenue; no exit number
St. Clair	East St. Louis	1.3	2.1	—	IL 15 east (Barack Obama Avenue) – Business District	Eastbound exit and westbound entrance; to Broadway Avenue
St. Clair	East St. Louis	1.8	2.9	2A	Third Street – Eads Bridge	Westbound exit and eastbound entrance
St. Clair	East St. Louis	1.9	3.1	2B-C	Martin Luther King Bridge – Downtown St. Louis	Westbound exit and eastbound entrance; left exit is signed as exit 2B and right exit as 2C
St. Clair	East St. Louis	2.7	4.3	3A	I-64 east / IL 3 north / St. Clair Avenue – Louisville	Eastern end of I-64/IL 3 concurrency; signed as exit 3 eastbound
St. Clair	East St. Louis	2.9	4.7	3B	I-70 west – Kansas City	Western end of I-70 concurrency; westbound exit and eastbound entrance
St. Clair	East St. Louis	3.0	4.8	3C	Exchange Avenue	Westbound exit and eastbound entrance
St. Clair	Madison–Fairmont City line	4.0	6.4	4	IL 203 – Fairmont City, Granite City, Collinsville Road	Signed as exits 4A (south) & 4B (north) westbound
Madison	Fairmont City	6.3	10.1	6	IL 111 / Great River Road north – Wood River, Washington Park	Eastern end of GRR concurrency
Madison	Collinsville	8.8	14.2	9	Black Lane	Eastbound exit and westbound entrance
Madison	Collinsville	9.9	15.9	10	I-255 to I-270 – Memphis	I-255 exit 25A/B
Madison	Collinsville	11.0	17.7	11	IL 157 (Bluff Road) – Collinsville, Edwardsville	
Madison	Maryville	14.6	23.5	15	IL 159 – Collinsville, Maryville	Signed as exits 15A (south) & 15B (north)
Madison	Troy	16.9	27.2	17	I-55 north / I-70 east – Chicago, Indianapolis	East end of I-55 / I-70 overlap; I-55/70 exit 17
Madison	Jarvis Township	20.9	33.6		IL 162 west / Historic National Road – Troy, Granite City	Eastern terminus of IL 162; Granite City signed westbound only
Madison	St. Jacob Township	23.2	37.3		IL 4 / Historic National Road – Lebanon, Staunton	One-quadrant interchange
Madison	Highland	30.1	48.4		IL 143 west / Walnut Street – Edwardsville, Business District	West end of IL 143 overlap
Madison	Highland	30.6	49.2		IL 160 north / Poplar Street	West end of IL 160 overlap
Madison	Saline Township	31.1	50.1		IL 160 south (Sycamore Street) / Historic National Road – Trenton, Highland	East end of IL 160 overlap; Trenton signed eastbound, Highland westbound
Madison	Saline Township	33.7	54.2		IL 143 east / Historic National Road / Gary Street – Pierron	East end of IL 143 overlap
Madison	Saline Township	34.0	54.7	30	I-70 west / Steiner Road – East St. Louis	West end of I-70 overlap; I-70 exit 30
Bond	Old Ripley Township	39.4– 39.7	63.4– 63.9	36	I-70 east / Pokey Road – Effingham	East end of I-70 overlap; I-70 exit 36
Bond	Pocahontas				Historic National Road (State Street)	
Bond	Central Township	45.3	72.9		I-70 / Millersburg Road – Effingham, St. Louis	Direct access to/from I-70 east via Millersburg Road; destinations signed westbound only; I-70 exit 41
Bond	Central Township				Historic National Road	
Bond	Greenville	49.0	78.9		IL 127 – Greenville, Carlyle, Carlyle Lake	
Fayette	Bear Grove Township				Historic National Road	Formerly IL 140
Fayette	Bear Grove Township	57.2	92.1		IL 140 west / Historic National Road – Mulberry Grove	Eastern terminus of IL 140
Fayette	Vandalia	64.4– 64.6	103.6– 104.0		I-70 – St. Louis, Effingham	I-70 exit 61
Fayette	Vandalia	65.8	105.9		IL 185 west (Hillsboro Road) / Sunset Drive – Coffeen, Lake Vandalia	West end of IL 185 overlap
Fayette	Vandalia	66.9	107.7		US 51 north (North Kennedy Boulevard) / Lincoln Heritage Trail to I-70 – Pana	West end of US 51 overlap; Pana signed eastbound only
Fayette	Vandalia				Historic National Road (Gallatin Street)	Formerly IL 140
Fayette	Vandalia Township	68.5	110.2		US 51 south / Lincoln Heritage Trail / East 1555 Avenue – Sandoval	East end of US 51 overlap
Fayette	Otego Township	72.6	116.8		IL 185 east – St. Peter	East end of IL 185 overlap
Fayette	Otego Township	73.0– 73.2	117.5– 117.8		I-70 – Effingham, St. Louis	I-70 exit 68
Fayette–Effingham county line	Avena–Mound township line	84.6	136.2		IL 128 north / North First Street – Cowden, Shelbyville, Lake Shelbyville	West end of IL 128 overlap; Lake Shelbyville signed eastbound only
Effingham	Altamont	88.0	141.6		IL 128 south (South Main Street) to I-70 / South Main Street – Business District	East end of IL 128 overlap
Effingham	Effingham	99.5	160.1		IL 32 north / IL 33 west (South Henrietta Street) to I-57 / I-70 / West Fayette Avenue – Shumway	West end of IL 33 overlap; southern terminus of IL 32
Effingham	Effingham	100.2	161.3		US 45 south (South Banker Street) / South Banker Street – Flora	West end of US 45 overlap
Effingham	Effingham	100.4	161.6		US 45 north (South Third Street) / Historic National Road to I-57 / I-70 / South Third Street	East end of US 45 overlap
Effingham	Effingham	100.6	161.9		IL 33 east (South Willow Street) / South Willow Street – Newton	East end of IL 33 overlap
Effingham	Effingham				Historic National Road (Jefferson Avenue)	
Cumberland	Union Township				Historic National Road (Cumberland Road)	
Cumberland	Greenup	123.2	198.3		IL 130 (South Haughton Highway) – Newton, Charleston	
Cumberland	Greenup				Historic National Road (Cumberland Street)	
Clark	Casey				Historic National Road (Cumberland Road)	
Clark	Casey	133.1	214.2		IL 49 to I-70 – Willow Hill, Kansas	
Clark	Martinsville Township				Historic National Road (Cumberland Street)	
Clark	Marshall Township				Historic National Road	
Clark	Marshall	150.5	242.2		IL 1 (North Michigan Avenue) – Paris, Lawrenceville, Lincoln Trail State Park	
Clark	Marshall				Historic National Road	
Clark	Wabash Township	157.8	254.0	154	I-70 west / Historic National Road (West Illiana Drive) – Effingham	West end of I-70 overlap; I-70 exit 154
Clark	Wabash Township	159.8	257.2		I-70 east / US 40 east – Terre Haute, Indianapolis	Continuation into Indiana
1.000 mi = 1.609 km; 1.000 km = 0.621 mi: Concurrency terminus; Incomplete access

== See also ==
U.S. Route 40
Previous state: Missouri	Illinois	Next state: Indiana
