= Shumway, Illinois =

- Village
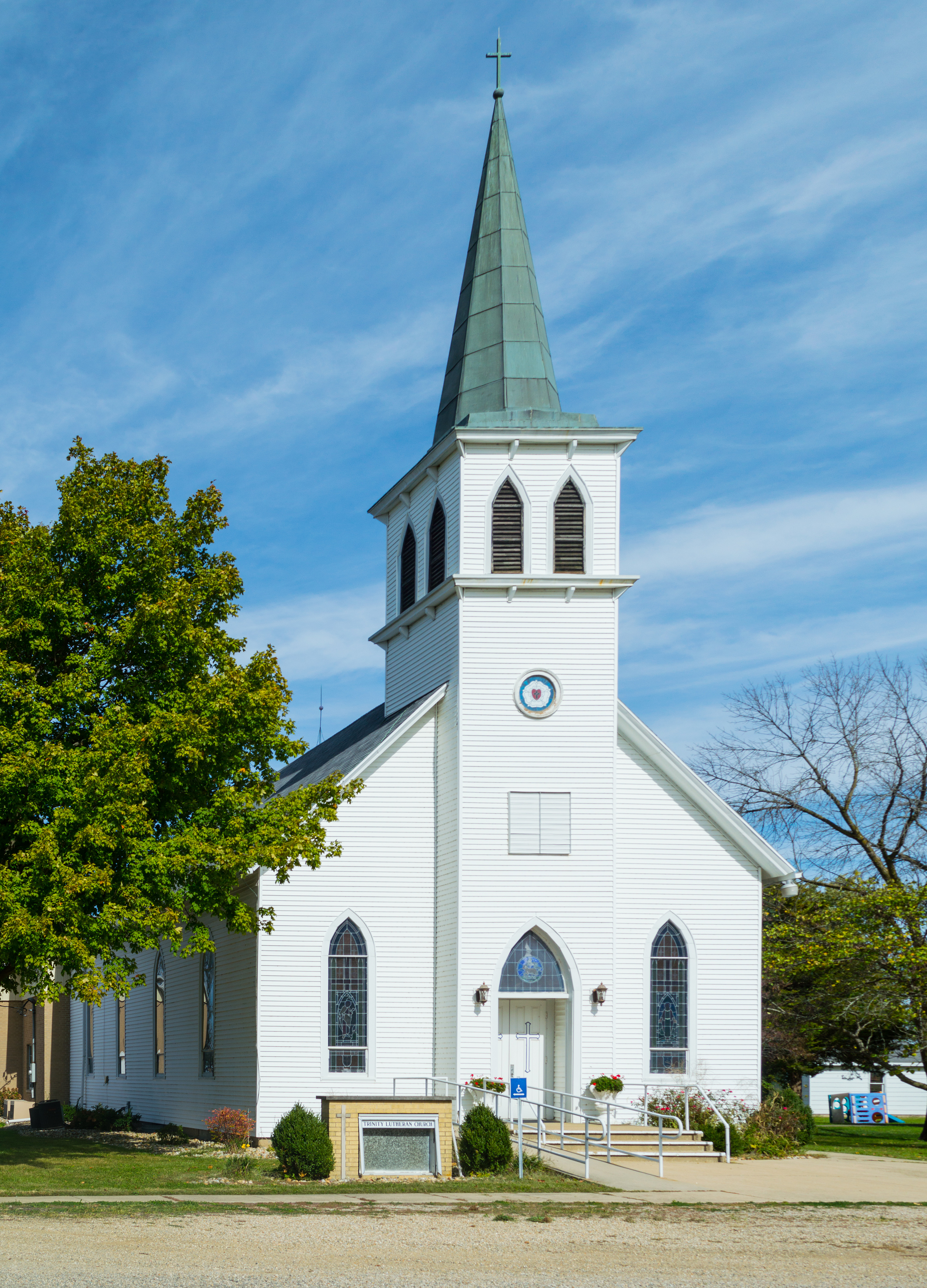
- Trinity Lutheran Church

- Location of Shumway in Effingham County, Illinois.
- Coordinates: 39°11′00″N 88°39′12″W
- Country: United States
- State: Illinois
- County: Effingham

Area
  - Total: 0.33 sq mi (0.86 km^{2})
  - Land: 0.33 sq mi (0.86 km^{2})
  - Water: 0 sq mi (0.00 km^{2})
- Elevation: 656 ft (200 m)

Population (2020)
  - Total: 188
  - Density: 566.0/sq mi (218.54/km^{2})
- Time zone: UTC-6 (CST)
  - Summer (DST): UTC-5 (CDT)
- ZIP code: 62461
- Area code: 217
- FIPS code: 17-69797
- GNIS ID: 2399816

Shumway is a village in Effingham County, Illinois, United States. As of the 2020 census, the village population was 188. Shumway is part of the Effingham, Illinois Micropolitan Statistical Area.

== Geography ==
Shumway is located in northern Effingham County and Illinois Route 33 crosses the southwest corner of the village, leading southeast 8 miles (13 km) to Effingham, the county seat, and west 7 miles (11 km) to Beecher City.

According to the 2010 census, Shumway has a total area of 0.33 square miles (0.85 km^{2}), all land.

== Demographics ==
Historical population
Census	Pop.	Note	%±
1880	130		—
1900	258		—
1910	291		12.8%
1920	269		−7.6%
1930	178		−33.8%
1940	180		1.1%
1950	248		37.8%
1960	212		−14.5%
1970	235		10.8%
1980	278		18.3%
1990	243		−12.6%
2000	217		−10.7%
2010	202		−6.9%
2020	188		−6.9%
U.S. Decennial Census

As of the 2020 census there were 188 people, 51 households, and 33 families residing in the village. The population density was 566.27 inhabitants per square mile (218.64/km^{2}). There were 90 housing units at an average density of 271.08 per square mile (104.66/km^{2}). The racial makeup of the village was 92.02% White, 0.00% African American, 0.00% Native American, 0.53% Asian, 0.00% Pacific Islander, 0.00% from other races, and 7.45% from two or more races. Hispanic or Latino of any race were 2.66% of the population.

There were 51 households, out of which 43.1% had children under the age of 18 living with them, 49.02% were married couples living together, 11.76% had a female householder with no husband present, and 35.29% were non-families. 17.65% of all households were made up of individuals, and 9.80% had someone living alone who was 65 years of age or older. The average household size was 3.21 and the average family size was 2.59.

The village's age distribution consisted of 22.7% under the age of 18, 7.6% from 18 to 24, 29.5% from 25 to 44, 24.1% from 45 to 64, and 15.9% who were 65 years of age or older. The median age was 36.3 years. For every 100 females, there were 112.9 males. For every 100 females age 18 and over, there were 92.5 males.

The median income for a household in the village was $59,375, and the median income for a family was $57,083. Males had a median income of $43,750 versus $22,031 for females. The per capita income for the village was $24,003. About 9.1% of families and 8.3% of the population were below the poverty line, including 10.0% of those under age 18 and 4.8% of those age 65 or over.

== Education ==
Shumway is in the Beecher City/Shumway School District., although in earlier years, rural Shumway residents in Summit Township have filed petitions to leave the district. Older residents of this area still hold allegiances to Effingham High School. The reason for this "allegiance" was because when Shumway High School closed, many students east and south of Shumway went to Effingham schools. When districts were drawn many residents felt Beecher City gerrymandered Shumway into the district. Today, many kids around Lake Sara and east Shumway attend Beecher City, although Effingham Community schools are much closer.
