= Watson, Illinois =

- Village
- Location of Watson in Effingham County, Illinois.
- Coordinates: 39°01′34″N 88°34′07″W
- Country: United States
- State: Illinois
- County: Effingham

Area
  - Total: 1.09 sq mi (2.83 km^{2})
  - Land: 1.09 sq mi (2.83 km^{2})
  - Water: 0 sq mi (0.00 km^{2})
- Elevation: 558 ft (170 m)

Population (2020)
  - Total: 668
  - Density: 611.8/sq mi (236.23/km^{2})
- Time zone: UTC-6 (CST)
  - Summer (DST): UTC-5 (CDT)
- ZIP code: 62473
- Area code: 217
- FIPS code: 17-79241
- GNIS ID: 2400106

Watson is a village in Effingham County, Illinois, United States. The population was 668 at the 2020 census. Watson is part of the Effingham, Illinois Micropolitan Statistical Area.

The village was named after George Watson, a railroad official.

== Geography ==
Watson is located in south-central Effingham County and Illinois Route 37 passes through the village, leading east 1.5 miles (2.4 km) to U.S. Route 45 and south 3 miles (5 km) to Interstate 57 at Exit 151. Effingham, the county seat, is 8 miles (13 km) north via US 45.

According to the 2021 census gazetteer files, Watson has a total area of 1.09 square miles (2.82 km^{2}), of which 1.09 square miles (2.82 km^{2}) (or 100.00%) is land and 0.00 square miles (0.00 km^{2}) (or 0.00%) is water.

== Demographics ==
Historical population
Census	Pop.	Note	%±
1880	190		—
1890	326		71.6%
1900	341		4.6%
1910	330		−3.2%
1920	316		−4.2%
1930	286		−9.5%
1940	282		−1.4%
1950	288		2.1%
1960	247		−14.2%
1970	276		11.7%
1980	551		99.6%
1990	646		17.2%
2000	729		12.8%
2010	754		3.4%
2020	668		−11.4%
U.S. Decennial Census

As of the 2020 census there were 668 people, 284 households, and 188 families residing in the village. The population density was 611.72 inhabitants per square mile (236.19/km^{2}). There were 283 housing units at an average density of 259.16 per square mile (100.06/km^{2}). The racial makeup of the village was 95.96% White, 0.30% African American, 0.00% Native American, 0.00% Asian, 0.00% Pacific Islander, 0.15% from other races, and 3.59% from two or more races. Hispanic or Latino of any race were 1.05% of the population.

There were 284 households, out of which 31.7% had children under the age of 18 living with them, 47.54% were married couples living together, 10.56% had a female householder with no husband present, and 33.80% were non-families. 23.24% of all households were made up of individuals, and 3.52% had someone living alone who was 65 years of age or older. The average household size was 3.26 and the average family size was 2.80.

The village's age distribution consisted of 25.7% under the age of 18, 9.8% from 18 to 24, 22.4% from 25 to 44, 32.4% from 45 to 64, and 9.8% who were 65 years of age or older. The median age was 36.3 years. For every 100 females, there were 88.4 males. For every 100 females age 18 and over, there were 99.0 males.

The median income for a household in the village was $57,500, and the median income for a family was $60,000. Males had a median income of $35,114 versus $23,594 for females. The per capita income for the village was $21,638. About 11.7% of families and 17.0% of the population were below the poverty line, including 26.6% of those under age 18 and 15.4% of those age 65 or over.
