= Illinois Route 33 =

State highway in southeastern Illinois, US

Illinois Route 33
- IL 33 highlighted in red

Route information
- Maintained by IDOT
- Length: 97.17 mi (156.38 km)
- Existed: November 5, 1918–present

Major junctions
- West end: IL 128 in Beecher City
- I-57 / I-70 in Effingham; US 40 / US 45 / IL 32 in Effingham; IL 1 in Gordon
- South end: US 50 in Lawrenceville

Location
- Country: United States
- State: Illinois
- Counties: Effingham, Jasper, Crawford, Lawrence

Highway system
- Illinois State Highway System; Interstate; US; State; Tollways; Scenic
← IL 32	→ US 34

Illinois Route 33 (IL 33) is a multidirectional highway in southeastern Illinois, with its western terminus at Illinois Route 128 on the Fayette–Effingham county line near Beecher City and its southern terminus at U.S. Route 50 east of Lawrenceville. It also overlaps Illinois Route 32 from Shumway to Effingham. The east–west portion of the highway is roughly 75 miles (121 km) long, and the north–south portion is about 22 miles (35 km) in length. This makes for a total distance of 97.17 miles (156.38 km).

== Route description ==
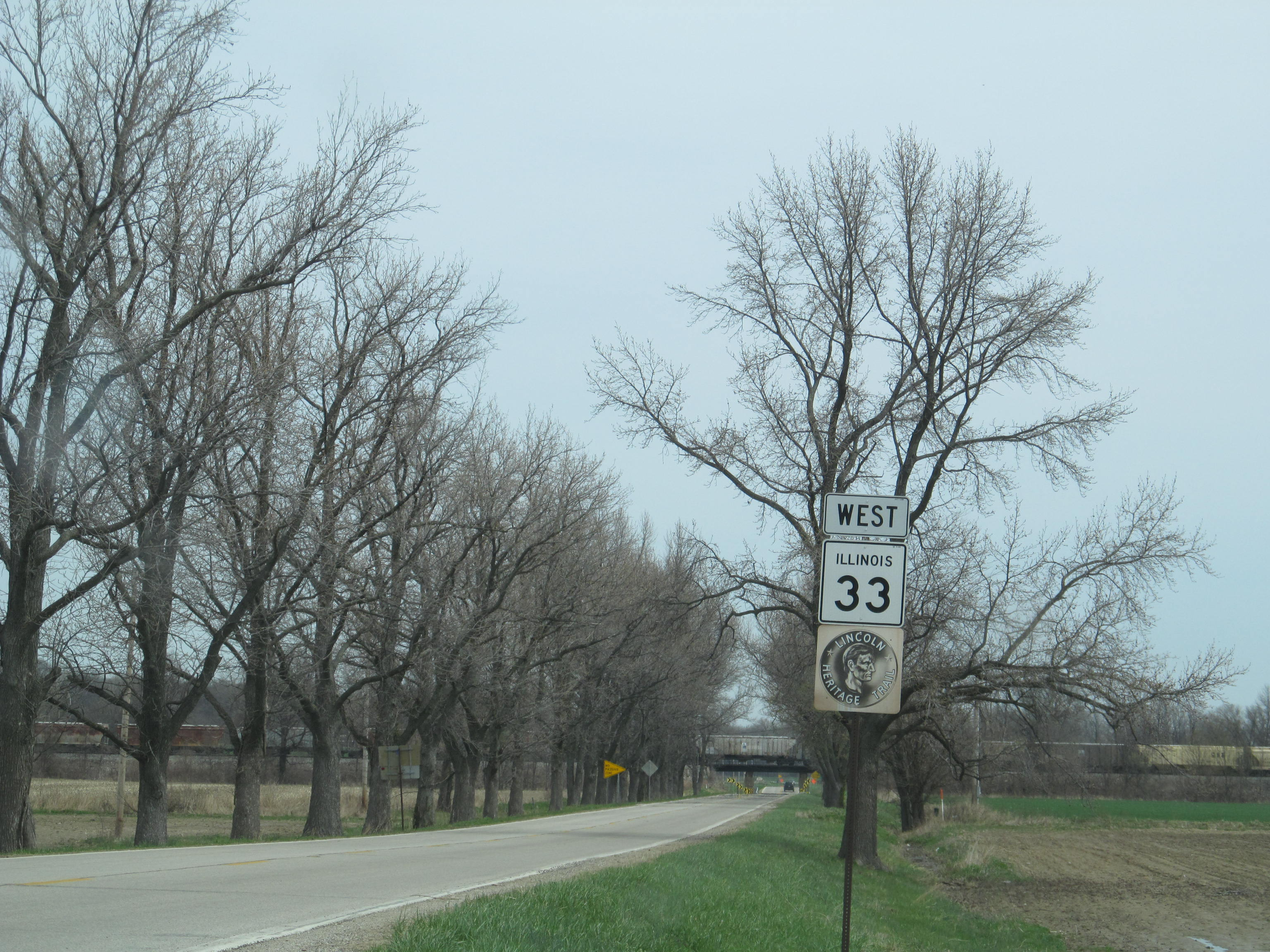
IL 33 westbound

Illinois 33 is a largely rural state highway. It runs east from near Beecher City to meet Illinois Route 32 in Shumway. Through Effingham it is Fayette Avenue and Willow Street. Continuing to the southeast, it runs through the small towns of Dieterich and Wheeler. It then travel through Newton and joins with Illinois Route 130 and goes north. Two miles north of Newton it branches off and travels east through Oblong and then to Robinson. In Palestine, the road runs along Washington and Franklin Streets before turning south on Jackson Street and leaving the city.

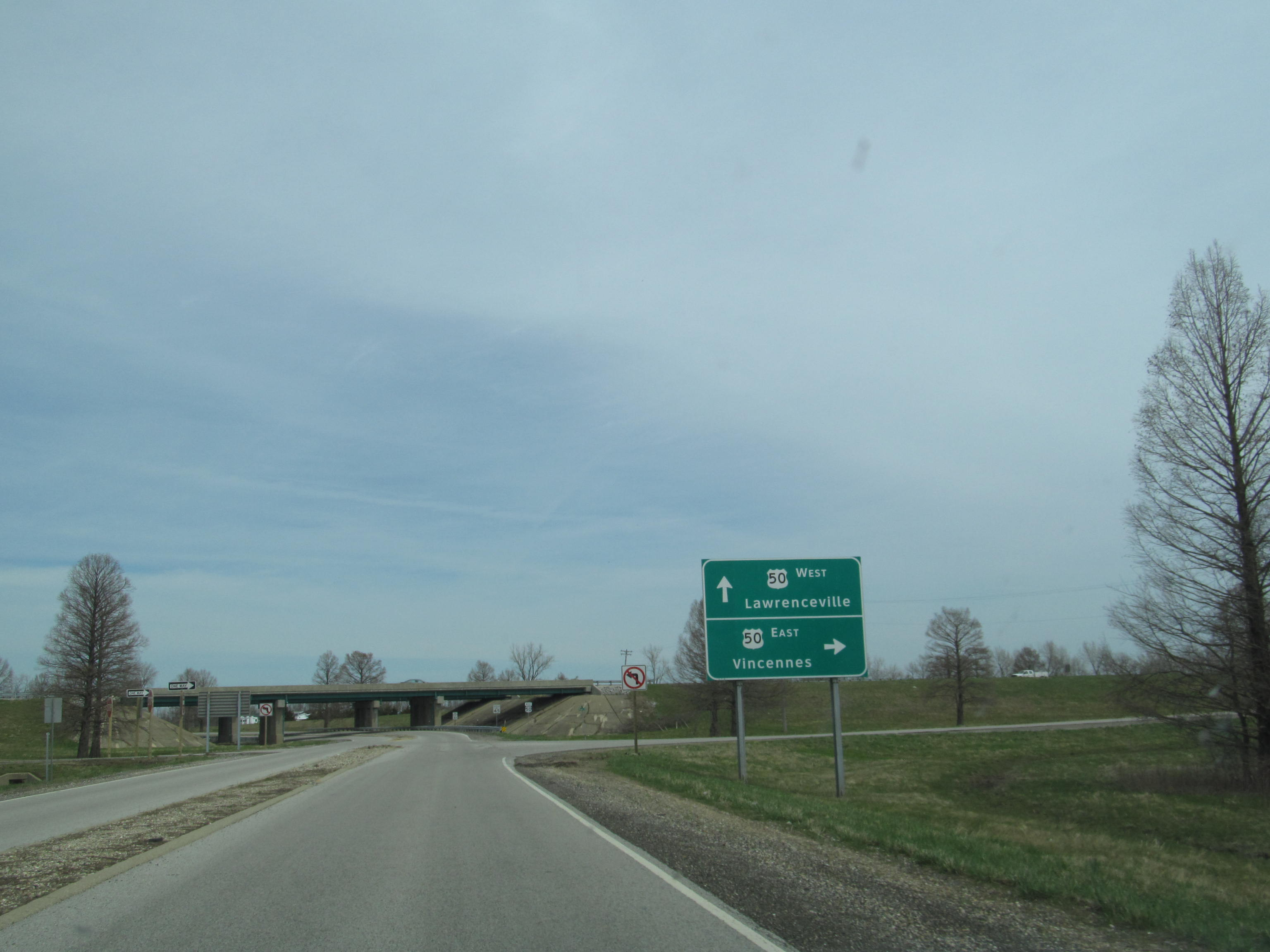
IL 33 approaching its southern terminus at US 50

Illinois 33 continues south, parallel to the Wabash River and beneath U.S. Route 50. There is no intersection at this point. Illinois 33 then travels west (along the old alignment of U.S. 50) and then back north to meet its terminus at a full interchange with U.S. 50.

== History ==
SBI Route 33 originally was Effingham to Gordon (near Robinson). In 1937, 1941 and 1948, extensions were made east to Palestine, west to Beecher City, and then south to U.S. 50 to complete the route.

== Major intersections ==
County	Location	mi	km	Destinations	Notes
Fayette–Effingham county line	Beecher City	0.0	0.0	IL 128	Western terminus
Effingham		10.4	16.7	IL 32 north	West end of IL 32 overlap
Effingham	Effingham	14.1	22.7	I-57 / I-70 – Mt. Vernon, East St. Louis, Champaign, Terre Haute	I-57 exit 160
Effingham	Effingham	15.2	24.5	US 40 west (Henrietta Street) / IL 32 ends	East end of IL 32 overlap; West end of US 40 overlap; Southern terminus of IL 32
Effingham	Effingham	15.8	25.4	US 45 south (Banker Street)	West end of US 45 overlap
Effingham	Effingham	16.0	25.7	US 45 north (3rd Street)	East end of US 45 overlap
Effingham	Effingham	16.2	26.1	US 40 east (Fayette Avenue)	East end of US 40 overlap
Jasper	Newton	39.3	63.2	IL 130 south (Van Buren Street)	West end of IL 130 overlap
Jasper		41.4	66.6	IL 130 north	East end of IL 130 overlap
Jasper	Willow Hill	47.8	76.9	IL 49 north	Southern terminus of IL 49
Crawford	Gordon	66.1	106.4	IL 1	
Crawford	Palestine			Lincoln Heritage Trail (Main Street)	North end of Lincoln Heritage Trail overlap
Lawrence				Lincoln Heritage Trail / Lincoln Heritage Trail (Eastern Branch) begins – Vincennes	South end of Lincoln Heritage Trail overlap; eastern terminus of Lincoln Heritage Trail Eastern Branch
Lawrence	Russellville			Lincoln Heritage Trail (Eastern Branch) (Old Route 50)	South end of Lincoln Heritage Trail Eastern Branch overlap
Lawrence	Lawrenceville	97.17	156.38	US 50 – Lawrenceville, Vincennes	Southern terminus
1.000 mi = 1.609 km; 1.000 km = 0.621 mi: Concurrency terminus
