= Effingham Community Unit School District 40 =

School district in Illinois, United States

Location
- Effingham, Illinois; United States

District information
- NCES District ID: 1713560

Students and staff
- Students: 2,314 (2020–2021)
- Teachers: 168.43 (on an FTE basis)(2020–2021)
- Student–teacher ratio: 13.74:1 (2020–2021)

Other information
- Website: www.unit40.org

Effingham Community Unit School District 40 is a school district in Effingham, Illinois. The district is composed of six schools and provides pre-kindergarten through twelfth grade.
