= Cottonwood Township, Cumberland County, Illinois =

Cottonwood Township
- Township
- Location in Cumberland County

- Cumberland County's location in Illinois
- Coordinates: 39°21′N 88°15′W
- Country: United States
- State: Illinois
- County: Cumberland
- Established: November 6, 1860

Area
  - Total: 32.74 sq mi (84.8 km^{2})
  - Land: 32.73 sq mi (84.8 km^{2})
  - Water: 0.01 sq mi (0.026 km^{2}) 0.04%
- Elevation: 643 ft (196 m)

Population (2020)
  - Total: 485
  - Density: 14.8/sq mi (5.72/km^{2})
- Time zone: UTC-6 (CST)
  - Summer (DST): UTC-5 (CDT)
- ZIP codes: 62428, 62440, 62468, 62469
- FIPS code: 17-035-16587

Cottonwood Township is one of eight townships in Cumberland County, Illinois, USA. As of the 2020 census, its population was 485 and it contained 223 housing units.

== Geography ==
According to the 2021 census gazetteer files, Cottonwood Township has a total area of 32.74 square miles (84.80 km^{2}), of which 32.73 square miles (84.77 km^{2}) (or 99.96%) is land and 0.01 square miles (0.03 km^{2}) (or 0.04%) is water. The Embarras River defines the township's eastern border.

=== Unincorporated towns ===
- Bradbury at 39.3242°N 88.2428°W
- Janesville at 39.3742°N 88.2437°W
- Johnstown at 39.3634°N 88.2870°W

=== Cemeteries ===
The township contains these three cemeteries: Haggins, Hutton and Tippett.

=== Airports and landing strips ===
- Thornton Airport

== Demographics ==
As of the 2020 census there were 485 people, 156 households, and 94 families residing in the township. The population density was 14.81 inhabitants per square mile (5.72/km^{2}). There were 223 housing units at an average density of 6.81 per square mile (2.63/km^{2}). The racial makeup of the township was 96.49% White, 0.00% African American, 0.21% Native American, 0.21% Asian, 0.00% Pacific Islander, 0.00% from other races, and 3.09% from two or more races. Hispanic or Latino of any race were 0.82% of the population.

There were 156 households, out of which 33.30% had children under the age of 18 living with them, 60.26% were married couples living together, 0.00% had a female householder with no spouse present, and 39.74% were non-families. 31.40% of all households were made up of individuals, and 12.80% had someone living alone who was 65 years of age or older. The average household size was 2.95 and the average family size was 3.60.

The township's age distribution consisted of 23.9% under the age of 18, 2.2% from 18 to 24, 16.9% from 25 to 44, 38.3% from 45 to 64, and 18.7% who were 65 years of age or older. The median age was 48.7 years. For every 100 females, there were 251.1 males. For every 100 females age 18 and over, there were 186.9 males.

The median income for a household in the township was $67,188, and the median income for a family was $96,855. Males had a median income of $32,344 versus $27,368 for females. The per capita income for the township was $31,765.No families and 13.0% of the population were below the poverty line, including none of those under age 18 and 46.5% of those age 65 or over.

Historical population
Census	Pop.	Note	%±
1930	830		—
1940	875		5.4%
1950	705		−19.4%
1960	633		−10.2%
1970	564		−10.9%
1980	556		−1.4%
1990	529		−4.9%
2000	508		−4.0%
2010	521		2.6%
2020	485		−6.9%
U.S. Decennial Census

== School districts ==
- Charleston Community Unit School District 1
- Cumberland Community Unit School District 77
- Neoga Community Unit School District 3

== Political districts ==
- State House District 109
- State Senate District 55
