= Union Township, Cumberland County, Illinois =

Union Township
- Township
- Location in Cumberland County

- Cumberland County's location in Illinois
- Coordinates: 39°20′N 88°5′W
- Country: United States
- State: Illinois
- County: Cumberland
- Established: November 6, 1860

Area
  - Total: 52.84 sq mi (136.9 km^{2})
  - Land: 52.73 sq mi (136.6 km^{2})
  - Water: 0.11 sq mi (0.28 km^{2}) 0.21%
- Elevation: 617 ft (188 m)

Population (2020)
  - Total: 667
  - Density: 12.6/sq mi (4.88/km^{2})
- Time zone: UTC-6 (CST)
  - Summer (DST): UTC-5 (CDT)
- ZIP codes: 61920, 62420, 62428
- FIPS code: 17-035-76641

Union Township is one of eight townships in Cumberland County, Illinois, USA. As of the 2020 census, its population was 667 and it contained 302 housing units.

== Geography ==
According to the 2021 census gazetteer files, Union Township has a total area of 52.84 square miles (136.85 km^{2}), of which 52.73 square miles (136.57 km^{2}) (or 99.79%) is land and 0.11 square miles (0.28 km^{2}) (or 0.21%) is water.

=== Cities, towns, villages ===
- Casey (west edge)

=== Unincorporated towns ===
- Maple Point at 39.3323°N 88.1131°W
- Union Center at 39.3328°N 88.0814°W
- Vevay Park at 39.2792°N 88.0536°W

=== Cemeteries ===
The township contains these nine cemeteries: Bell, Decker, Garrett, Jack Oak, Long Point, Macedonia, Neal, Nebo and Union.

=== Major highways ===
- Interstate 70
- U.S. Route 40
- Illinois Route 130

== Demographics ==
As of the 2020 census there were 667 people, 149 households, and 111 families residing in the township. The population density was 12.62 inhabitants per square mile (4.87/km^{2}). There were 302 housing units at an average density of 5.72 per square mile (2.21/km^{2}). The racial makeup of the township was 95.50% White, 0.00% African American, 0.15% Native American, 0.15% Asian, 0.15% Pacific Islander, 0.15% from other races, and 3.90% from two or more races. Hispanic or Latino of any race were 0.75% of the population.

There were 149 households, out of which 6.00% had children under the age of 18 living with them, 72.48% were married couples living together, none had a female householder with no spouse present, and 25.50% were non-families. 25.50% of all households were made up of individuals, and 4.00% had someone living alone who was 65 years of age or older. The average household size was 1.81 and the average family size was 2.08.

The township's age distribution consisted of 10.0% under the age of 18, 0.0% from 18 to 24, 4.5% from 25 to 44, 53.9% from 45 to 64, and 31.6% who were 65 years of age or older. The median age was 62.9 years. For every 100 females, there were 128.0 males. For every 100 females age 18 and over, there were 124.1 males.

The median income for a household in the township was $68,674, and the median income for a family was $70,208. Males had a median income of $41,739 versus $21,250 for females. The per capita income for the township was $34,727. None of the population was below the poverty line.

Historical population
Census	Pop.	Note	%±
1930	1,381		—
1940	1,353		−2.0%
1950	1,099		−18.8%
1960	915		−16.7%
1970	742		−18.9%
1980	771		3.9%
1990	698		−9.5%
2000	758		8.6%
2010	690		−9.0%
2020	667		−3.3%
U.S. Decennial Census

== School districts ==
- Casey-Westfield Community Unit School District 4c
- Cumberland Community Unit School District 77

== Political districts ==
- State House District 110
- State Senate District 55
