= Grove Township, Jasper County, Illinois =

Grove Township
- Township
- Location in Jasper County

- Jasper County's location in Illinois
- Coordinates: 39°07′41″N 88°16′39″W
- Country: United States
- State: Illinois
- County: Jasper
- Established: November 8, 1859

Area
  - Total: 49.42 sq mi (128.0 km^{2})
  - Land: 49.42 sq mi (128.0 km^{2})
  - Water: 0 sq mi (0 km^{2}) 0%
- Elevation: 571 ft (174 m)

Population (2020)
  - Total: 595
  - Density: 12.0/sq mi (4.65/km^{2})
- Time zone: UTC-6 (CST)
  - Summer (DST): UTC-5 (CDT)
- ZIP codes: 62428, 62432, 62436, 62445, 62448, 62467, 62479
- FIPS code: 17-079-31888

Grove Township is one of eleven townships in Jasper County, Illinois, USA. As of the 2010 census, its population was 618 and it contained 254 housing units.

== Geography ==
According to the 2021 census gazetteer files, Grove Township has a total area of 49.42 square miles (128.00 km^{2}), all land.

=== Unincorporated towns ===
- Gila, the township seat, at 39.112819°N 88.260319°W
- Island Grove at 39.102542°N 88.335321°W

(This list is based on USGS data and may include former settlements.)

=== Adjacent townships ===
- Woodbury Township, Cumberland County (north)
- Greenup Township, Cumberland County (northeast)
- Crooked Creek Township (east)
- Wade Township (southeast)
- North Muddy Township (south)
- Bishop Township, Effingham County (southwest)
- St. Francis Township, Effingham County (west)
- Spring Point Township, Cumberland County (northwest)

=== Cemeteries ===
The township contains these seven cemeteries: Brewer, Diel, Fairfield, Hicks, Island Creek, Myer and St Joseph/Island Grove.

=== Airports and landing strips ===
- Isley Airport

== Demographics ==
As of the 2020 census there were 595 people, 243 households, and 200 families residing in the township. The population density was 12.04 inhabitants per square mile (4.65/km^{2}). There were 254 housing units at an average density of 5.14 per square mile (1.98/km^{2}). The racial makeup of the township was 99.50% White, 0.00% African American, 0.00% Native American, 0.00% Asian, 0.00% Pacific Islander, 0.17% from other races, and 0.34% from two or more races. Hispanic or Latino of any race were 0.34% of the population.

There were 243 households, out of which 26.70% had children under the age of 18 living with them, 72.84% were married couples living together, 9.47% had a female householder with no spouse present, and 17.70% were non-families. 17.70% of all households were made up of individuals, and 7.00% had someone living alone who was 65 years of age or older. The average household size was 2.70 and the average family size was 2.98.

The township's age distribution consisted of 14.5% under the age of 18, 6.6% from 18 to 24, 28.1% from 25 to 44, 30% from 45 to 64, and 20.9% who were 65 years of age or older. The median age was 50.2 years. For every 100 females, there were 109.9 males. For every 100 females age 18 and over, there were 86.7 males.

The median income for a household in the township was $70,938, and the median income for a family was $72,292. Males had a median income of $45,774 versus $27,083 for females. The per capita income for the township was $30,395. About 4.0% of families and 3.7% of the population were below the poverty line, including 0.0% of those under age 18 and 17.5% of those age 65 or over.

Historical population
Census	Pop.	Note	%±
2000	616		—
2010	618		0.3%
2020	595		−3.7%
U.S. Decennial Census

== School districts ==
- Dieterich Community Unit School District 30
- Jasper County Community Unit School District 1

== Political districts ==
- Illinois' 19th congressional district
- State House District 108
- State Senate District 54
