= Greenup Township, Cumberland County, Illinois =

Greenup Township
- Township
- Location in Cumberland County

- Cumberland County's location in Illinois
- Coordinates: 39°13′N 88°9′W
- Country: United States
- State: Illinois
- County: Cumberland
- Established: November 6, 1860

Area
  - Total: 47.48 sq mi (123.0 km^{2})
  - Land: 47.45 sq mi (122.9 km^{2})
  - Water: 0.03 sq mi (0.078 km^{2}) 0.07%
- Elevation: 594 ft (181 m)

Population (2020)
  - Total: 2,257
  - Density: 47.57/sq mi (18.37/km^{2})
- Time zone: UTC-6 (CST)
  - Summer (DST): UTC-5 (CDT)
- ZIP codes: 62420, 62428, 62468
- FIPS code: 17-035-31537

Greenup Township is one of eight townships in Cumberland County, Illinois, USA. As of the 2020 census, its population was 2,257 and it contained 1,102 housing units.

== Geography ==
According to the 2021 census gazetteer files, Greenup Township has a total area of 47.48 square miles (122.97 km^{2}), of which 47.45 square miles (122.89 km^{2}) (or 99.93%) is land and 0.03 square miles (0.08 km^{2}) (or 0.07%) is water. The Embarras River defines a portion of the township's western border.

=== Cities, towns, villages ===
- Greenup

=== Unincorporated towns ===
- Liberty Hill at 39.2012°N 88.1542°W
- Timothy at 39.3031°N 88.1295°W
- Walla Walla at 39.2009°N 88.1923°W

=== Cemeteries ===
The township contains these seven cemeteries: Block, Boots, Greenup, Harmony, Liberty Hill, Paul and Peach Orchard.

=== Major highways ===
- Interstate 70
- U.S. Route 40
- Illinois Route 121
- Illinois Route 130

== Demographics ==
As of the 2020 census there were 2,257 people, 1,060 households, and 618 families residing in the township. The population density was 47.54 inhabitants per square mile (18.36/km^{2}). There were 1,102 housing units at an average density of 23.21 per square mile (8.96/km^{2}). The racial makeup of the township was 94.95% White, 0.49% African American, 0.27% Native American, 0.18% Asian, 0.04% Pacific Islander, 0.22% from other races, and 3.85% from two or more races. Hispanic or Latino of any race were 1.37% of the population.

There were 1,060 households, out of which 29.30% had children under the age of 18 living with them, 51.04% were married couples living together, 4.91% had a female householder with no spouse present, and 41.70% were non-families. 38.70% of all households were made up of individuals, and 19.30% had someone living alone who was 65 years of age or older. The average household size was 2.36 and the average family size was 3.07.

The township's age distribution consisted of 24.6% under the age of 18, 4.8% from 18 to 24, 25.1% from 25 to 44, 24.9% from 45 to 64, and 20.4% who were 65 years of age or older. The median age was 41.8 years. For every 100 females, there were 87.1 males. For every 100 females age 18 and over, there were 88.5 males.

The median income for a household in the township was $46,190, and the median income for a family was $70,926. Males had a median income of $41,087 versus $24,955 for females. The per capita income for the township was $28,357. About 4.4% of families and 10.4% of the population were below the poverty line, including 12.5% of those under age 18 and 7.3% of those age 65 or over.

Historical population
Census	Pop.	Note	%±
1930	2,069		—
1940	2,692		30.1%
1950	2,447		−9.1%
1960	2,361		−3.5%
1970	2,412		2.2%
1980	2,587		7.3%
1990	2,500		−3.4%
2000	2,411		−3.6%
2010	2,413		0.1%
2020	2,257		−6.5%
U.S. Decennial Census

== School districts ==
- Casey-Westfield Community Unit School District 4c
- Cumberland Community Unit School District 77
- Jasper County Community Unit School District 1

== Political districts ==
- State House District 109
- State Senate District 55
