= Spring Point Township, Cumberland County, Illinois =

Spring Point Township
- Township
- Location in Cumberland County

- Cumberland County's location in Illinois
- Coordinates: 39°14′N 88°24′W
- Country: United States
- State: Illinois
- County: Cumberland
- Established: November 6, 1860

Area
  - Total: 55.91 sq mi (144.8 km^{2})
  - Land: 55.91 sq mi (144.8 km^{2})
  - Water: 0 sq mi (0 km^{2}) 0%
- Elevation: 620 ft (190 m)

Population (2020)
  - Total: 1,332
  - Density: 23.82/sq mi (9.198/km^{2})
- Time zone: UTC-6 (CST)
  - Summer (DST): UTC-5 (CDT)
- ZIP codes: 62436, 62445, 62447, 62462, 62467, 62468
- FIPS code: 17-035-72143

Spring Point Township is one of eight townships in Cumberland County, Illinois, USA. As of the 2020 census, its population was 1,332 and it contained 485 housing units.

== Geography ==
According to the 2021 census gazetteer files, Spring Point Township has a total area of 55.91 square miles (144.81 km^{2}), all land.

=== Cities, towns, villages ===
- Montrose (north quarter)

=== Unincorporated towns ===
- Lillyville at 39.1898°N 88.4520°W
- Roslyn at 39.2295°N 88.3781°W

=== Cemeteries ===
The township contains these nine cemeteries: Brush Creek, Elliott, Faunce, Illinois Central Pioneer, Kingery, Lillyville, Mullen, Needham and Saint Rose.

=== Major highways ===
- Interstate 57
- Interstate 70
- U.S. Route 40
- Illinois Route 121

Historical population
Census	Pop.	Note	%±
1930	1,044		—
1940	1,173		12.4%
1950	1,007		−14.2%
1960	1,002		−0.5%
1970	956		−4.6%
1980	1,092		14.2%
1990	1,131		3.6%
2000	1,207		6.7%
2010	1,294		7.2%
2020	1,332		2.9%
U.S. Decennial Census

== Demographics ==
As of the 2020 census there were 1,332 people, 458 households, and 305 families residing in the township. The population density was 23.82 inhabitants per square mile (9.20/km^{2}). There were 485 housing units at an average density of 8.67 per square mile (3.35/km^{2}). The racial makeup of the township was 97.07% White, 0.00% African American, 0.08% Native American, 0.15% Asian, 0.00% Pacific Islander, 0.23% from other races, and 2.48% from two or more races. Hispanic or Latino of any race were 0.68% of the population.

There were 458 households, out of which 35.40% had children under the age of 18 living with them, 51.97% were married couples living together, 5.90% had a female householder with no spouse present, and 33.41% were non-families. 33.40% of all households were made up of individuals, and 6.10% had someone living alone who was 65 years of age or older. The average household size was 2.85 and the average family size was 3.72.

The township's age distribution consisted of 23.0% under the age of 18, 15.9% from 18 to 24, 27.5% from 25 to 44, 20.8% from 45 to 64, and 12.7% who were 65 years of age or older. The median age was 32.8 years. For every 100 females, there were 99.5 males. For every 100 females age 18 and over, there were 87.5 males.

The median income for a household in the township was $48,571, and the median income for a family was $74,464. Males had a median income of $44,187 versus $21,500 for females. The per capita income for the township was $25,459. About 4.6% of families and 11.5% of the population were below the poverty line, including 23.4% of those under age 18 and 0.0% of those age 65 or over.

== School districts ==
- Cumberland Community Unit School District 77
- Dieterich Community Unit School District 30
- Neoga Community Unit School District 3
- Teutopolis Community Unit School District 50

== Political districts ==
- State House District 109
- State Senate District 55
