= Neoga Township, Cumberland County, Illinois =

Neoga Township
- Township
- Location in Cumberland County

- Cumberland County's location in Illinois
- Coordinates: 39°19′N 88°24′W
- Country: United States
- State: Illinois
- County: Cumberland
- Established: November 6, 1860

Area
  - Total: 55.49 sq mi (143.7 km^{2})
  - Land: 54.68 sq mi (141.6 km^{2})
  - Water: 0.82 sq mi (2.1 km^{2}) 1.47%
- Elevation: 673 ft (205 m)

Population (2020)
  - Total: 2,778
  - Density: 50.80/sq mi (19.62/km^{2})
- Time zone: UTC-6 (CST)
  - Summer (DST): UTC-5 (CDT)
- ZIP codes: 62447, 62468, 62469
- FIPS code: 17-035-51993

Neoga Township is one of eight townships in Cumberland County, Illinois, USA. As of the 2020 census, its population was 2,778 and it contained 1,311 housing units.

== Geography ==
According to the 2021 census gazetteer files, Neoga Township has a total area of 55.49 square miles (143.72 km^{2}), of which 54.68 square miles (141.62 km^{2}) (or 98.53%) is land and 0.82 square miles (2.12 km^{2}) (or 1.47%) is water.

=== Cities, towns, villages ===
- Neoga

=== Unincorporated towns ===
- Neal at 39.3020°N 88.3417°W

=== Cemeteries ===
The township contains these eight cemeteries: Concord, Drummond, Illinois Central Railroad, Lockhart, Long Point, Neoga, Neoga Railroad Crossing and Zion.

=== Major highways ===
- Interstate 57
- U.S. Route 45
- Illinois Route 121

=== Airports and landing strips ===
- Cumberland Air Park
- Williamson Airport

== Demographics ==
As of the 2020 census there were 2,778 people, 1,169 households, and 862 families residing in the township. The population density was 50.06 inhabitants per square mile (19.33/km^{2}). There were 1,311 housing units at an average density of 23.62 per square mile (9.12/km^{2}). The racial makeup of the township was 94.96% White, 0.43% African American, 0.25% Native American, 0.14% Asian, 0.07% Pacific Islander, 0.54% from other races, and 3.60% from two or more races. Hispanic or Latino of any race were 1.51% of the population.

There were 1,169 households, out of which 27.40% had children under the age of 18 living with them, 69.20% were married couples living together, 2.57% had a female householder with no spouse present, and 26.26% were non-families. 18.70% of all households were made up of individuals, and 10.90% had someone living alone who was 65 years of age or older. The average household size was 2.55 and the average family size was 2.97.

The township's age distribution consisted of 20.0% under the age of 18, 5.9% from 18 to 24, 24% from 25 to 44, 27% from 45 to 64, and 23.2% who were 65 years of age or older. The median age was 45.1 years. For every 100 females, there were 100.5 males. For every 100 females age 18 and over, there were 100.7 males.

The median income for a household in the township was $74,050, and the median income for a family was $86,331. Males had a median income of $49,375 versus $23,045 for females. The per capita income for the township was $33,820. About 4.6% of families and 8.2% of the population were below the poverty line, including 6.1% of those under age 18 and 10.1% of those age 65 or over.

Historical population
| Census | Pop. | Note | %± |
|---|---|---|---|
| 1930 | 2,158 | | — |
| 1940 | 2,104 | | −2.5% |
| 1950 | 2,176 | | 3.4% |
| 1960 | 2,129 | | −2.2% |
| 1970 | 2,308 | | 8.4% |
| 1980 | 2,958 | | 28.2% |
| 1990 | 2,952 | | −0.2% |
| 2000 | 3,291 | | 11.5% |
| 2010 | 3,124 | | −5.1% |
| 2020 | 2,778 | | −11.1% |
U.S. Decennial Census

== School districts ==
- Cumberland Community Unit School District 77
- Mattoon Community Unit School District 2
- Neoga Community Unit School District 3

== Political districts ==
- State House District 109
- State Senate District 55
