= Crooked Creek Township, Illinois =

Crooked Creek Township may refer to one of the following places in the State of Illinois:

- Crooked Creek Township, Cumberland County, Illinois
- Crooked Creek Township, Jasper County, Illinois

See also

- Crooked Creek Township (disambiguation)
