= Lincoln Bancroft =

American businessman and politician

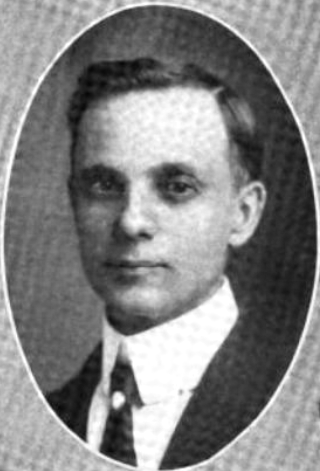

Member of the Illinois House of Representatives
- In office 1916–1930

Personal details
- Born: June 30, 1877 Johnstown, Illinois
- Died: July 16, 1942 (aged 65) Effingham, Illinois
- Party: Republican
- Occupation: Lawyer, politician

Lincoln Bancroft (June 30, 1877 – July 16, 1942) was an American businessman and politician.

== Biography ==
Born in Johnstown, Cumberland County, Illinois, Bancroft studied law in Greenup, Illinois. He was in the real estate and oil business. He served as mayor of Greenup, Illinois and was a Republican. He served in the Illinois House of Representatives from 1917 to 1929.

Bancroft died in an automobile accident near Effingham, Illinois when his automobile crashed into a bridge on United States Route 45.
