= Sumpter Township, Cumberland County, Illinois =

Sumpter Township
- Township
- Location in Cumberland County

- Cumberland County's location in Illinois
- Coordinates: 39°16′N 88°15′W
- Country: United States
- State: Illinois
- County: Cumberland
- Established: November 6, 1860

Area
  - Total: 45.69 sq mi (118.3 km^{2})
  - Land: 45.69 sq mi (118.3 km^{2})
  - Water: 0 sq mi (0 km^{2}) 0%
- Elevation: 594 ft (181 m)

Population (2020)
  - Total: 2,051
  - Density: 44.89/sq mi (17.33/km^{2})
- Time zone: UTC-6 (CST)
  - Summer (DST): UTC-5 (CDT)
- ZIP codes: 62428, 62436, 62445, 62468, 62469
- FIPS code: 17-035-73729

Sumpter Township is one of eight townships in Cumberland County, Illinois, USA. As of the 2020 census, its population was 2,051 and it contained 880 housing units.

== Geography ==
According to the 2010 census, the township has a total area of 45.69 square miles (118.3 km^{2}), all land.

=== Cities, towns, villages ===
- Toledo

=== Cemeteries ===
The township contains these seven cemeteries: Bear Creek, Berry, Farmer, Friends Grove, Salem, Toledo and Upper Berry.

=== Major highways ===
- Interstate 70
- U.S. Route 40
- Illinois Route 121

== Demographics ==
As of the 2020 census there were 2,051 people, 840 households, and 584 families residing in the township. The population density was 44.89 inhabitants per square mile (17.33/km^{2}). There were 880 housing units at an average density of 19.26 per square mile (7.44/km^{2}). The racial makeup of the township was 96.10% White, 0.15% African American, 0.15% Native American, 0.34% Asian, 0.00% Pacific Islander, 0.24% from other races, and 3.02% from two or more races. Hispanic or Latino of any race were 0.78% of the population.

There were 840 households, out of which 28.50% had children under the age of 18 living with them, 60.95% were married couples living together, 5.48% had a female householder with no spouse present, and 30.48% were non-families. 24.40% of all households were made up of individuals, and 19.50% had someone living alone who was 65 years of age or older. The average household size was 2.49 and the average family size was 2.96.

The township's age distribution consisted of 24.7% under the age of 18, 8.2% from 18 to 24, 23.2% from 25 to 44, 27.4% from 45 to 64, and 16.5% who were 65 years of age or older. The median age was 37.8 years. For every 100 females, there were 105.9 males. For every 100 females age 18 and over, there were 104.0 males.

The median income for a household in the township was $67,500, and the median income for a family was $80,357. Males had a median income of $41,105 versus $29,926 for females. The per capita income for the township was $27,878. About 8.4% of families and 10.2% of the population were below the poverty line, including 13.0% of those under age 18 and 12.4% of those age 65 or over.

Historical population
Census	Pop.	Note	%±
1930	1,524		—
1940	1,945		27.6%
1950	1,756		−9.7%
1960	1,691		−3.7%
1970	1,745		3.2%
1980	1,970		12.9%
1990	1,872		−5.0%
2000	1,967		5.1%
2010	1,980		0.7%
2020	2,051		3.6%
U.S. Decennial Census

== School districts ==
- Cumberland Community Unit School District 77
- Neoga Community Unit School District 3

== Political districts ==
- State House District 109
- State Senate District 55
