= Woodbury Township, Cumberland County, Illinois =

Woodbury Township
- Township
- Location in Cumberland County

- Cumberland County's location in Illinois
- Coordinates: 39°12′N 88°16′W
- Country: United States
- State: Illinois
- County: Cumberland
- Established: November 6, 1860

Area
  - Total: 22.66 sq mi (58.7 km^{2})
  - Land: 22.62 sq mi (58.6 km^{2})
  - Water: 0.01 sq mi (0.026 km^{2}) 0.04%
- Elevation: 554 ft (169 m)

Population (2020)
  - Total: 555
  - Density: 24.5/sq mi (9.47/km^{2})
- Time zone: UTC-6 (CST)
  - Summer (DST): UTC-5 (CDT)
- ZIP codes: 62436, 62445, 62468
- FIPS code: 17-035-82959

Woodbury Township is one of eight townships in Cumberland County, Illinois, USA. As of the 2020 census, its population was 555 and it contained 245 housing units.

== Geography ==
According to the 2021 census gazetteer files, Woodbury Township has a total area of 22.62 square miles (58.59 km^{2}), of which 22.61 square miles (58.56 km^{2}) (or 99.96%) is land and 0.01 square miles (0.03 km^{2}) (or 0.04%) is water. Woodbury Lake is in this township.

=== Cities, towns, villages ===
- Jewett

=== Unincorporated towns ===
- Woodbury at 39.1959°N 88.3031°W

=== Cemeteries ===
The township contains these two cemeteries: Chezem and Jewett.

=== Major highways ===
- Interstate 70
- U.S. Route 40

== Demographics ==
As of the 2020 census there were 555 people, 274 households, and 190 families residing in the township. The population density was 24.54 inhabitants per square mile (9.47/km^{2}). There were 245 housing units at an average density of 10.83 per square mile (4.18/km^{2}). The racial makeup of the township was 95.86% White, 0.00% African American, 0.54% Native American, 0.54% Asian, 0.00% Pacific Islander, 0.18% from other races, and 2.88% from two or more races. Hispanic or Latino of any race were 0.54% of the population.

There were 274 households, out of which 25.20% had children under the age of 18 living with them, 63.87% were married couples living together, 2.19% had a female householder with no spouse present, and 30.66% were non-families. 30.70% of all households were made up of individuals, and 17.20% had someone living alone who was 65 years of age or older. The average household size was 2.37 and the average family size was 2.81.

The township's age distribution consisted of 15.7% under the age of 18, 2.5% from 18 to 24, 22.6% from 25 to 44, 32.1% from 45 to 64, and 27.1% who were 65 years of age or older. The median age was 55.1 years. For every 100 females, there were 97.9 males. For every 100 females age 18 and over, there were 108.8 males.

The median income for a household in the township was $45,833, and the median income for a family was $52,500. Males had a median income of $40,147 versus $20,610 for females. The per capita income for the township was $24,598. About 19.5% of families and 23.2% of the population were below the poverty line, including 29.0% of those under age 18 and none of those age 65 or over.

Historical population
Census	Pop.	Note	%±
1930	668		—
1940	714		6.9%
1950	655		−8.3%
1960	584		−10.8%
1970	540		−7.5%
1980	583		8.0%
1990	574		−1.5%
2000	684		19.2%
2010	604		−11.7%
2020	555		−8.1%
U.S. Decennial Census

== School districts ==
- Cumberland Community Unit School District 77
- Dieterich Community Unit School District 30

== Political districts ==
- State House District 109
- State Senate District 55
