= Illinois Route 250 =

State highway in southeastern Illinois, US

Illinois Route 250
- IL 250 highlighted in red

Route information
- Maintained by IDOT
- Length: 33.44 mi (53.82 km)
- Existed: 1965–present

Major junctions
- West end: US 50 in Noble
- US 50 in Olney; US 50 in Sumner
- East end: US 50 Bus. in Lawrenceville

Location
- Country: United States
- State: Illinois
- Counties: Richland, Lawrence

Highway system
- Illinois State Highway System; Interstate; US; State; Tollways; Scenic
← IL 242	→ IL 251

Illinois Route 250 is an east–west state highway in southeastern Illinois. It is similar to Illinois Route 251 in that portions of the highway replace former alignments of U.S. Route 50. Illinois 250 has its western terminus west of the city limits of Noble and its eastern terminus at U.S. Route 50 Business in Lawrenceville. This is a distance of 33.44 miles (53.82 km).

== Route description ==
Illinois 250 serves the downtown areas of five population centers in southeast Illinois: Noble, Olney, Sumner, Bridgeport and Lawrenceville; the largest of these centers is Olney with 8,631 people as of the year 2000. Both Lawrenceville and Olney are county seats of Lawrence and Richland counties, respectively. All of the population centers are feeder cities to Vincennes, which has a population of 18,071 and is the commercial center of the region.

== History ==
U.S. Route 50 was upgraded to a divided highway in this area (portions of which were limited-access highway) from the mid-1960s into the 1970s. Illinois 250 has been used to designate the U.S. Route 50 business routes into these cities since 1965.

== Major intersections ==
County	Location	mi	km	Destinations	Notes
Richland		0.0	0.0	US 50	Western terminus
Richland	Olney	9.4	15.1	IL 130 north (West Street)	Western end of IL 130 overlap
Richland	Olney	10.5	16.9	US 50 west / IL 130 south	Eastern end of IL 130 overlap; western end of US 50 overlap
Lawrence		23.1	37.2	US 50 east	Eastern end of US 50 overlap
Lawrence	Lawrenceville	33.44	53.82	US 50 Bus.	Eastern terminus
1.000 mi = 1.609 km; 1.000 km = 0.621 mi: Concurrency terminus
