= Liberty Hill, Illinois =

- Unincorporated community
- Location within Illinois Location within the United States
- Coordinates: 39°12′04″N 88°09′15″W
- Country: United States
- State: Illinois
- County: Cumberland
- Elevation: 587 ft (179 m)
- Time zone: UTC-6 (Central (CST))
  - Summer (DST): UTC-5 (CDT)
- Area code: 217
- GNIS feature ID: 1725681

Liberty Hill is an unincorporated community in Cumberland County, Illinois, United States. Liberty Hill is located on Illinois Route 130 3 miles (4.8 km) south-southeast of Greenup.
