= Illinois Route 130 =

State highway in eastern Illinois, US

Illinois Route 130
- IL 130 highlighted in red

Route information
- Maintained by IDOT
- Length: 135.87 mi (218.66 km)
- Existed: 1924–present

Major junctions
- South end: IL 1 in Grayville
- US 50 in Olney; US 40 in Greenup; I-70 in Greenup; US 36 in Camargo; US 150 in Urbana
- North end: I-74 in Urbana

Location
- Country: United States
- State: Illinois
- Counties: Edwards, Richland, Jasper, Cumberland, Coles, Douglas, Champaign

Highway system
- Illinois State Highway System; Interstate; US; State; Tollways; Scenic
← IL 129	→ IL 131

Illinois Route 130 is a north–south state highway in eastern Illinois. It runs from Illinois Route 1 in Grayville north to Interstate 74 in Urbana. This is a distance of 135.87 miles (218.66 km). Illinois 130 is the main north–south highway through Charleston, the home of Eastern Illinois University.

== Route description ==
Illinois 130 begins very near the Wabash River at Illinois 1 in Grayville. Traveling north, it overlaps Illinois Route 33 in Newton, U.S. Route 36 in Camargo and U.S. Route 150 in Urbana. It is also called High Cross Road in Urbana. Illinois 130 is an undivided two-lane surface state highway for its entire length.

== History ==
SBI Route 130 was what Illinois 130 is now from Albion north to Charleston. In March 1937, when Illinois 1 was moved to a new road further south, Illinois 130 was extended south to Illinois 1. In 1964, Illinois 130 was extended north to Mira Station, an unincorporated area south of Champaign in Champaign County. The highway was formerly county highways The University of Illinois Trail, with U and I superimposed, then the symbol of the University of Illinois.. In the 1980s it was moved to its present terminus, now running north from Philo to Urbana and along U.S. 150 to Interstate 74. There is a short 4-lane divided stretch from US 150 to I-74, the only 4-lane portion of Illinois 130.

=== IL 130A ===
Illinois Route 130A
- Location: Boos–Sainte Marie, Illinois
- Existed: 1931–1942

Illinois Route 130A was a spur of Illinois Route 130 during the 1930s. The route ran from Route 130 in Boos to Sainte Marie, a distance of 5 miles (8.0 km). Initially, IL 130A used to be signed as IL 130 but it only acted like a spur route to Sainte Marie. IL 130A replaced a portion of that in 1931. It eventually got decommissioned in 1942. The route is now a local road known as both 600th Avenue and Embarras Street.

== Major intersections ==
County	Location	mi	km	Destinations	Notes
Edwards	Grayville	0.0	0.0	IL 1 – Mt. Carmel, Grayville, Carmi	
Edwards	Albion	8.5	13.7	IL 15 west	South end of IL 15 concurrency
Edwards	Albion	8.6	13.8	IL 15 east	North end of IL 15 concurrency
Richland	Olney	32.6	52.5	US 50 / IL 250 east – Flora, Lawrenceville	South end of IL 250 concurrency
Richland	Olney	33.7	54.2	IL 250 west – Noble	North end of IL 250 concurrency
Jasper	Newton	52.9	85.1	IL 33 west – Effingham	South end of IL 33 concurrency
Jasper		55.0	88.5	IL 33 east	North end of IL 33 concurrency
Cumberland	Greenup	71.6	115.2	US 40 – Jewett, Casey	
Cumberland	Greenup	71.8	115.6	IL 121 north – Toledo	
Cumberland	Greenup	72.1	116.0	I-70 – Effingham, Terre Haute	I-70 exit 119
Coles	Charleston	89.2	143.6	IL 16 – Mattoon, Paris	
Douglas		103.5	166.6	IL 133 – Arcola, Paris	
Douglas	Camargo	111.2	179.0	US 36 west – Tuscola	South end of US 36 concurrency
Douglas	Camargo	112.0	180.2	US 36 east	North end of US 36 concurrency
Champaign	Urbana	134.3	216.1	US 150 east – St. Joseph	South end of US 150 concurrency
Champaign	Urbana	135.4	217.9	US 150 west	North end of US 150 concurrency
Champaign	Urbana	135.87	218.66	I-74 – Bloomington, Danville	I-74 exit 185
1.000 mi = 1.609 km; 1.000 km = 0.621 mi: Concurrency terminus
