= Sumpter Township =

Sumpter Township may refer to:

- Sumpter Township, Bradley County, Arkansas, in Bradley County, Arkansas
- Sumpter Township, Cumberland County, Illinois
- Sumpter Township, Wayne County, Michigan
