= Neal, Illinois =

- Unincorporated community
- Location within Illinois Location within the United States
- Coordinates: 39°18′07″N 88°20′30″W
- Country: United States
- State: Illinois
- County: Cumberland
- Elevation: 630 ft (190 m)
- Time zone: UTC-6 (Central (CST))
  - Summer (DST): UTC-5 (CDT)
- Area code: 217
- GNIS feature ID: 423012

Neal is an unincorporated community in Cumberland County, Illinois, United States. Neal is 5.5 miles (8.9 km) west-northwest of Toledo.
