= Vevay Park, Illinois =

- Unincorporated community
- Location within Illinois Location within the United States
- Coordinates: 39°16′45″N 88°03′13″W
- Country: United States
- State: Illinois
- County: Cumberland
- Elevation: 614 ft (187 m)
- Time zone: UTC-6 (Central (CST))
  - Summer (DST): UTC-5 (CDT)
- Area code: 217
- GNIS feature ID: 423277

Vevay Park is an unincorporated community in Cumberland County, Illinois, United States. It is located 3.5 miles (5.6 km) west-southwest of Casey, Illinois.

The community was established about 1869 by the Vandalia Railroad, and called "Long Point Station". Grant Pickett, who operated a pumping station for the railroad, renamed the town after his former home of Vevay, Indiana.

A post office was established in 1883 and named "Vevay"; the name was changed to Vevay Park in 1887.
