= Roslyn, Illinois =

- Unincorporated community
- Location within Illinois Location within the United States
- Coordinates: 39°13′46″N 88°22′41″W
- Country: United States
- State: Illinois
- County: Cumberland
- Elevation: 617 ft (188 m)
- Time zone: UTC-6 (Central (CST))
  - Summer (DST): UTC-5 (CDT)
- Area code: 217
- GNIS feature ID: 423133

Roslyn is an unincorporated community in Cumberland County, Illinois, United States. Roslyn is 4.5 miles (7.2 km) north of Montrose.
