= Janesville, Illinois =

- Unincorporated community and Census-designated place
- Janesville Wesleyan Church

- Janesville is located on the southern edge of Pleasant Grove Township, Coles County, Illinois.
- Coordinates: 39°22′29″N 88°14′43″W
- Country: United States
- State: Illinois
- Counties: Coles and Cumberland

Area
  - Total: 0.062 sq mi (0.16 km^{2})
  - Land: 0.062 sq mi (0.16 km^{2})
  - Water: 0 sq mi (0.00 km^{2})
- Elevation: 689 ft (210 m)

Population (2020)
  - Total: 76
  - Density: 1,237.7/sq mi (477.88/km^{2})
- Time zone: UTC−6 (Central (CST))
  - Summer (DST): UTC−5 (CDT)
- ZIP Code: 62435
- Area code: 217
- GNIS feature ID: 2806504

Janesville is a Census-designated place in Coles and Cumberland counties, Illinois, United States. As of the 2020 census, Janesville had a population of 76. Janesville is 7 miles (11 km) north of Toledo. Janesville has a post office with the ZIP Code 62435.

== Demographics ==
Historical population
Census	Pop.	Note	%±
2020	76		—
U.S. Decennial Census

Janesville first appeared as a census designated place in the 2020 U.S. census.

== Education ==
It is in the Charleston Community Unit School District 1.
