= Boos, Illinois =

- Unincorporated community
- Location within Illinois Location within the United States
- Coordinates: 38°55′48″N 88°06′39″W
- Country: United States
- State: Illinois
- County: Jasper
- Elevation: 512 ft (156 m)
- Time zone: UTC-6 (Central (CST))
  - Summer (DST): UTC-5 (CDT)
- Area code: 618
- GNIS feature ID: 422487

Boos (/boʊs/) is an unincorporated community in Jasper County, Illinois, United States. Boos is located on Illinois Route 130, southeast of Newton. The community once had a grocery store and a station on the Illinois Central Railroad.
