= Bradbury, Illinois =

- Unincorporated community
- Location within Illinois Location within the United States
- Coordinates: 39°19′27″N 88°14′34″W
- Country: United States
- State: Illinois
- County: Cumberland
- Elevation: 604 ft (184 m)
- Time zone: UTC-6 (Central (CST))
  - Summer (DST): UTC-5 (CDT)
- Area code: 217
- GNIS feature ID: 422494

Bradbury is an unincorporated community in Cumberland County, Illinois, United States. Bradbury is 3.5 miles (5.6 km) north of Toledo.
