= Woodbury, Illinois =

- Unincorporated community
- Location within Illinois Location within the United States
- Coordinates: 39°11′45″N 88°18′11″W
- Country: United States
- State: Illinois
- County: Cumberland
- Elevation: 594 ft (181 m)
- Time zone: UTC-6 (Central (CST))
  - Summer (DST): UTC-5 (CDT)
- Area code: 217
- GNIS feature ID: 421421

Woodbury is an unincorporated community in Cumberland County, Illinois, United States. Woodbury is located on U.S. Route 40 3 miles (4.8 km) west-southwest of Jewett.
