= Union Center, Illinois =

- Unincorporated community
- Location within Illinois Location within the United States
- Coordinates: 39°19′58″N 88°04′53″W
- Country: United States
- State: Illinois
- County: Cumberland
- Elevation: 617 ft (188 m)
- Time zone: UTC-6 (Central (CST))
  - Summer (DST): UTC-5 (CDT)
- Area code: 217
- GNIS feature ID: 420036

Union Center is an unincorporated community in Cumberland County, Illinois, United States. Union Center is 5.5 miles (8.9 km) northwest of Casey.
