= Timothy, Illinois =

Unincorporated community in Illinois

- Unincorporated community
- Location within Illinois Location within the United States
- Coordinates: 39°18′11″N 88°07′46″W
- Country: United States
- State: Illinois
- County: Cumberland
- Elevation: 597 ft (182 m)
- Time zone: UTC-6 (Central (CST))
  - Summer (DST): UTC-5 (CDT)
- Area code: 217
- GNIS feature ID: 423242

Timothy is an unincorporated community in Cumberland County, Illinois, United States. Timothy is 4.5 miles (7.2 km) north-northeast of Greenup.
