= Crooked Creek Township, Cumberland County, Illinois =

Crooked Creek Township
- Township
- Location in Cumberland County

- Cumberland County's location in Illinois
- Coordinates: 39°13′N 88°3′W
- Country: United States
- State: Illinois
- County: Cumberland
- Established: November 6, 1860

Area
  - Total: 34.16 sq mi (88.5 km^{2})
  - Land: 34.16 sq mi (88.5 km^{2})
  - Water: 0 sq mi (0 km^{2}) 0%
- Elevation: 610 ft (186 m)

Population (2020)
  - Total: 325
  - Density: 9.51/sq mi (3.67/km^{2})
- Time zone: UTC-6 (CST)
  - Summer (DST): UTC-5 (CDT)
- ZIP codes: 62420, 62428
- FIPS code: 17-035-17640

Crooked Creek Township is one of eight townships in Cumberland County, Illinois, USA. As of the 2020 census, its population was 325 and it contained 180 housing units.

== Geography ==
According to the 2021 census gazetteer files, Crooked Creek Township has a total area of 34.16 square miles (88.47 km^{2}), all land.

=== Unincorporated towns ===
- Hazel Dell at 39.2022°N 88.0411°W

=== Cemeteries ===
The township contains these five cemeteries: Church of Christ, Church of God, Duck Pond, Ruffner and Washington.

=== Major highways ===
- U.S. Route 40
- Illinois Route 49

== Demographics ==
As of the 2020 census there were 325 people, 123 households, and 110 families residing in the township. The population density was 9.52 inhabitants per square mile (3.68/km^{2}). There were 180 housing units at an average density of 5.27 per square mile (2.03/km^{2}). The racial makeup of the township was 92.92% White, 0.62% African American, 0.00% Native American, 0.31% Asian, 0.31% Pacific Islander, 0.00% from other races, and 5.85% from two or more races. Hispanic or Latino of any race were 0.62% of the population.

There were 123 households, out of which 49.60% had children under the age of 18 living with them, 73.98% were married couples living together, 4.88% had a female householder with no spouse present, and 10.57% were non-families. 10.60% of all households were made up of individuals, and 10.60% had someone living alone who was 65 years of age or older. The average household size was 3.30 and the average family size was 3.57.

The township's age distribution consisted of 33.5% under the age of 18, 8.1% from 18 to 24, 19% from 25 to 44, 25.2% from 45 to 64, and 14.3% who were 65 years of age or older. The median age was 34.9 years. For every 100 females, there were 112.6 males. For every 100 females age 18 and over, there were 81.2 males.

The median income for a household in the township was $58,688. Males had a median income of $44,394 versus $14,900 for females. The per capita income for the township was $25,454. About 23.6% of families and 32.8% of the population were below the poverty line, including 46.3% of those under age 18 and 0.0% of those age 65 or over.

Historical population
Census	Pop.	Note	%±
1930	745		—
1940	842		13.0%
1950	651		−22.7%
1960	601		−7.7%
1970	505		−16.0%
1980	545		7.9%
1990	414		−24.0%
2000	427		3.1%
2010	422		−1.2%
2020	325		−23.0%
U.S. Decennial Census

== School districts ==
- Casey-Westfield Community Unit School District 4c
- Cumberland Community Unit School District 77
- Jasper County Community Unit School District 1

== Political districts ==
- State House District 109
- State Senate District 55
