= Cumberland County Courthouse (Illinois) =

Local government building in the United States

- U.S. National Register of Historic Places
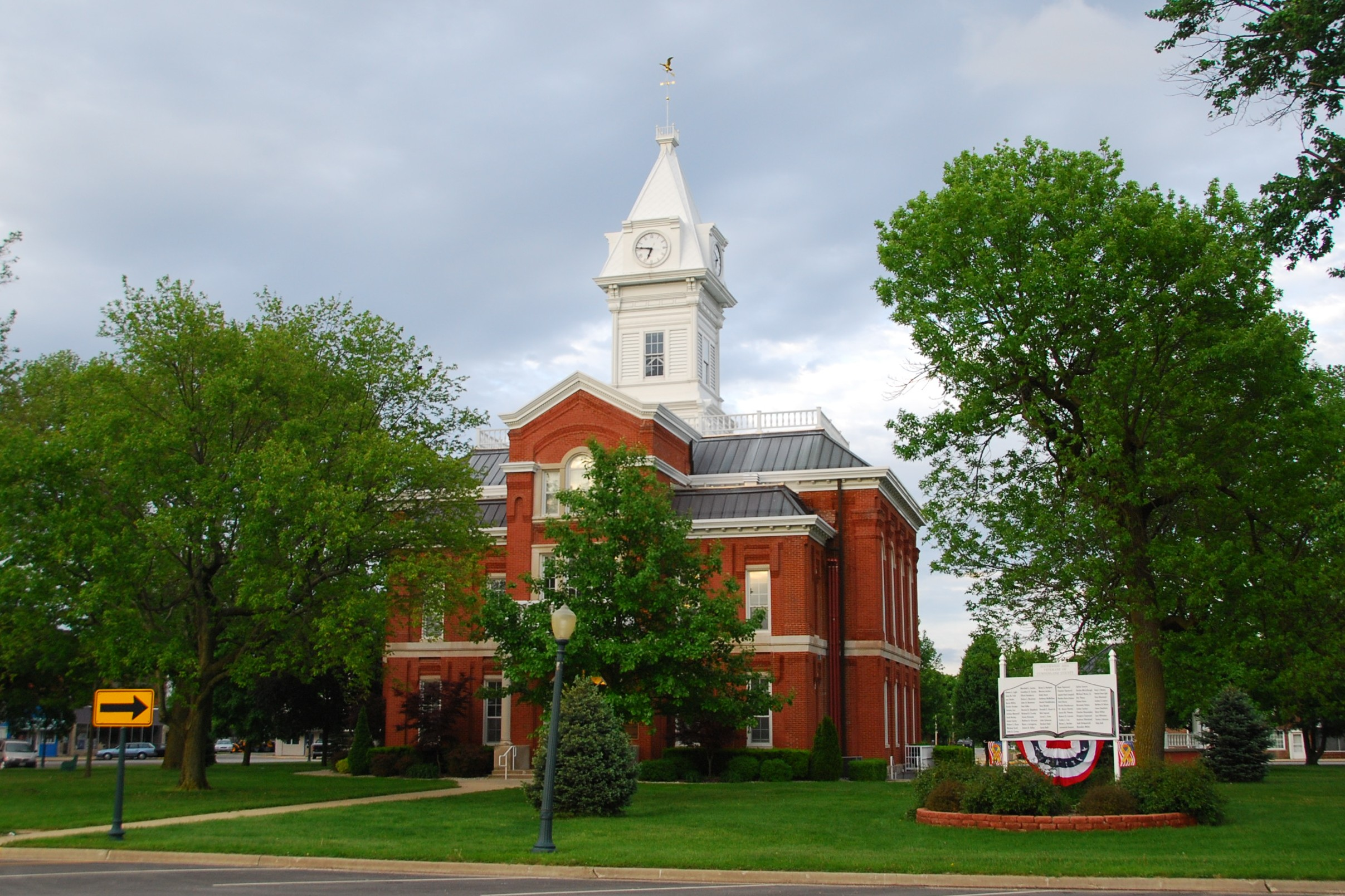

- Location within Illinois Location within the United States
- Location: Court House Sq., Toledo, Illinois
- Coordinates: 39°16′20″N 88°14′34″W
- Area: 1 acre (0.40 ha)
- Built: 1887-88
- NRHP reference No.: 81000220
- Added to NRHP: June 11, 1981

The Cumberland County Courthouse, located in Courthouse Square in Toledo, is the county courthouse of Cumberland County, Illinois. Built in 1887–88, the building is Cumberland County's second courthouse. The first courthouse, located at the same site as the current one, was built in 1856 and burned in 1885. The second courthouse was designed by architects S. S. Goehring and L.L. Pierson. The building's design features a central clock tower, arched entrances on the east and west sides, column-supported balconies above the entrances, and a balustrade along the roofline. The building has continuously served as the seat of county government since its opening.

The courthouse was added to the National Register of Historic Places on June 11, 1981.

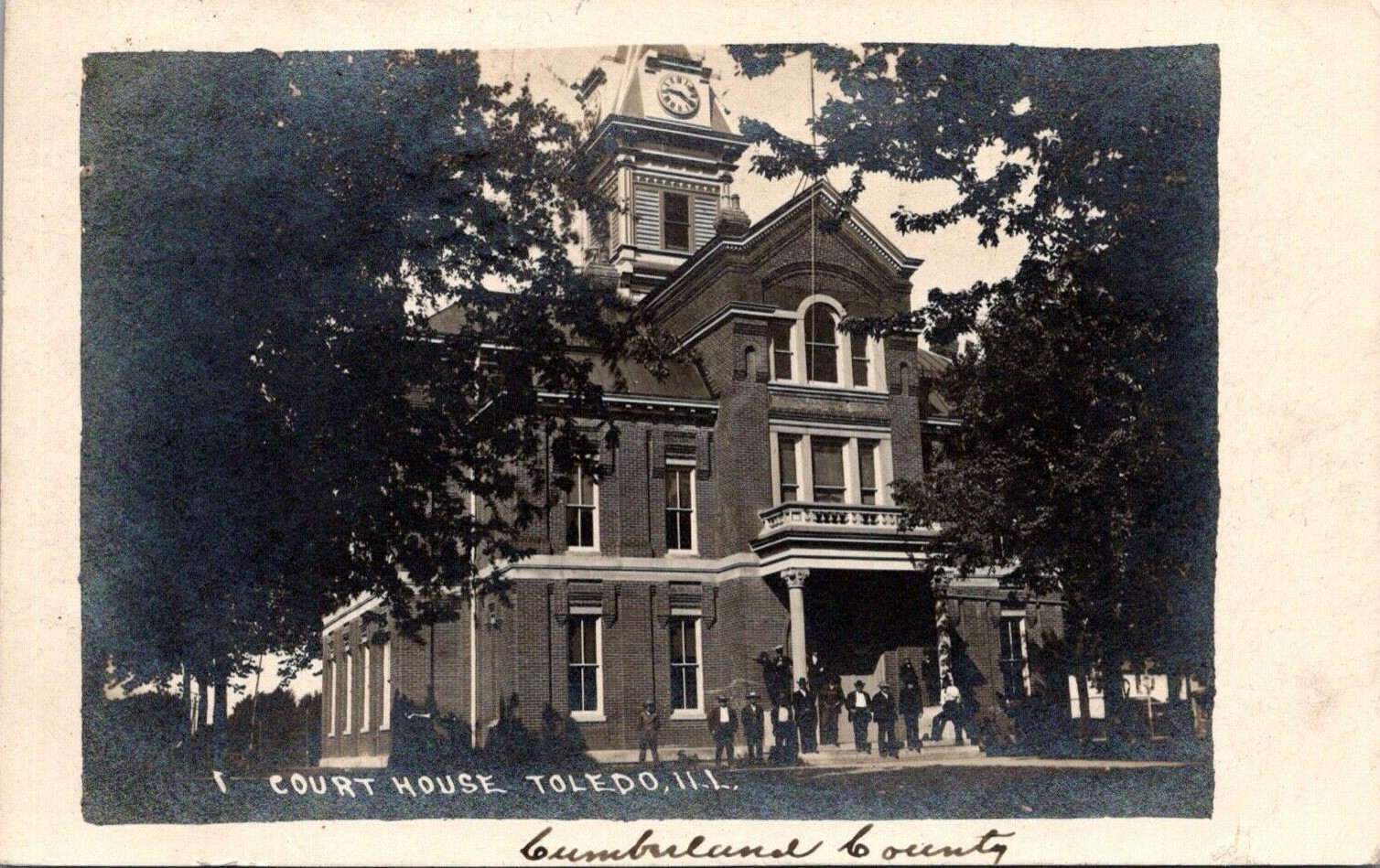
The courthouse was shown on this postcard sent on May 3, 1910.
