= Hazel Dell, Illinois =

- Unincorporated community
- Location within Illinois Location within the United States
- Coordinates: 39°12′08″N 88°02′28″W
- Country: United States
- State: Illinois
- County: Cumberland
- Elevation: 600 ft (180 m)
- Time zone: UTC-6 (Central (CST))
  - Summer (DST): UTC-5 (CDT)
- Area code: 217
- GNIS feature ID: 409973

Hazel Dell is an unincorporated community in Cumberland County, Illinois, United States. Hazel Dell is 7 miles (11 km) east-southeast of Greenup.
