= Maple Point, Illinois =

- Unincorporated community
- Location within Illinois Location within the United States
- Coordinates: 39°19′56″N 88°06′47″W
- Country: United States
- State: Illinois
- County: Cumberland
- Elevation: 600 ft (180 m)
- Time zone: UTC-6 (Central (CST))
  - Summer (DST): UTC-5 (CDT)
- Area code: 217
- GNIS feature ID: 422936

Maple Point is an unincorporated community in Cumberland County, Illinois, United States. Maple Point is 7 miles (11 km) west-northwest of Casey.
