= Crooked Creek Township =

Crooked Creek Township may refer to one of the following places in the United States:

- Crooked Creek Township, Cumberland County, Illinois
- Crooked Creek Township, Jasper County, Illinois
- Crooked Creek Township, Houston County, Minnesota
- Crooked Creek Township, Bollinger County, Missouri
