= Walla Walla, Illinois =

- Unincorporated community
- Location within Illinois Location within the United States
- Coordinates: 39°12′03″N 88°11′32″W
- Country: United States
- State: Illinois
- County: Cumberland
- Elevation: 587 ft (179 m)
- Time zone: UTC-6 (Central (CST))
  - Summer (DST): UTC-5 (CDT)
- Area code: 217
- GNIS feature ID: 423281

Walla Walla is an unincorporated community in Cumberland County, Illinois, United States. Walla Walla is 3 miles (4.8 km) east-southeast of Jewett.

== Namesake ==
It is named after Walla Walla, a city in Washington state, which in turn was named after a native American term meaning "Place of Many Waters".

== Geography ==
Walla Walla (GNIS FID: 423281) is a populated place located within the Township of Greenup, a minor civil division (MCD) of Cumberland County. The elevation of Walla Walla is 587 feet. Walla Walla appears on the Greenup U.S. Geological Survey Map. Cumberland County is in the Central Time Zone (UTC -6 hours).
