= Lillyville, Illinois =

- Unincorporated community
- Location within Illinois Location within the United States
- Coordinates: 39°11′23″N 88°27′07″W
- Country: United States
- State: Illinois
- County: Cumberland
- Elevation: 597 ft (182 m)
- Time zone: UTC-6 (Central (CST))
  - Summer (DST): UTC-5 (CDT)
- Area code: 217
- GNIS feature ID: 422913

Lillyville is an unincorporated community in Cumberland County, Illinois, United States. Lillyville is 4 miles (6.4 km) west-northwest of Montrose.
