= Cumberland County, Illinois =

County in Illinois, United States

- County
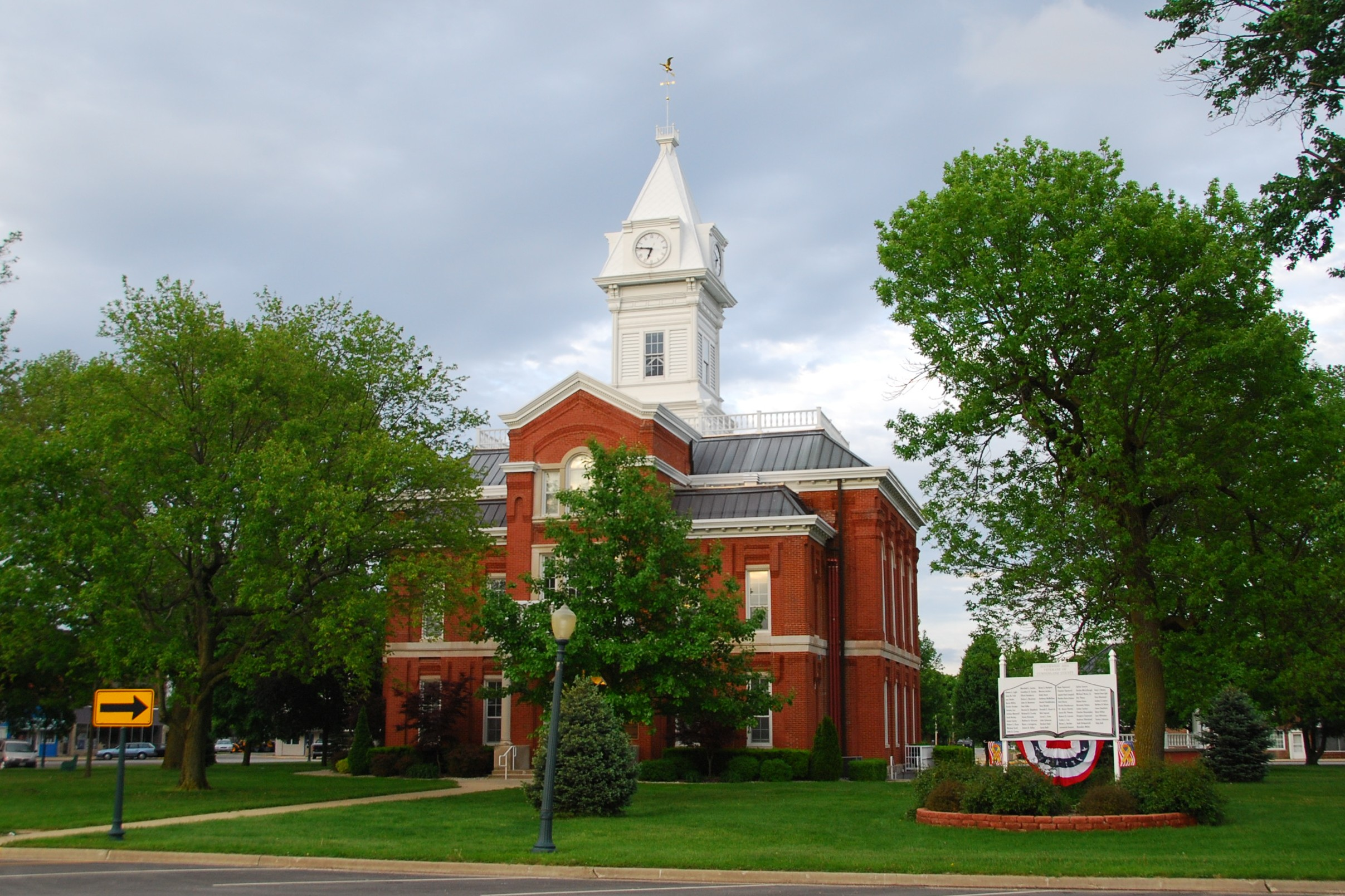
- Cumberland County Courthouse

- Location within the U.S. state of Illinois
- Coordinates: 39°16′N 88°14′W
- Country: United States
- State: Illinois
- Founded: 1843
- Named for: Cumberland Road
- Seat: Toledo
- Largest city: Neoga

Area
  - Total: 347 sq mi (900 km^{2})
  - Land: 346 sq mi (900 km^{2})
  - Water: 1.0 sq mi (2.6 km^{2}) 0.3%

Population (2020)
  - Total: 10,450
  - Estimate (2025): 10,208 ▼
  - Density: 30.2/sq mi (11.7/km^{2})
- Congressional district: 12th
- Website: cumberlandcoil.gov

Cumberland County is a county located in the U.S. state of Illinois. As of the 2020 census, the population was 10,450. Its county seat is Toledo.

Cumberland County is part of the Charleston–Mattoon, IL Micropolitan Statistical Area.

== History ==
Cumberland County was created on March 2, 1843, from parts of Coles County. It is named for the National Road (Cumberland Road), which was projected to run through it.

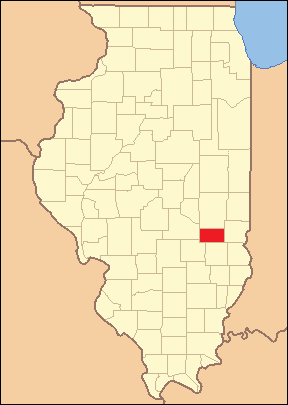
Cumberland County at the time of its creation in 1843

== Geography ==
According to the U.S. Census Bureau, the county has a total area of 347 square miles (900 km^{2}), of which 346 square miles (900 km^{2}) is land and 1.0 square mile (2.6 km^{2}) (0.3%) is water.

=== Climate and weather ===
Toledo, Illinois

Climate chart (precipitation, max. and min. temperature)
| J | F | M | A | M | J | J | A | S | O | N | D |
| 2 33 17 | 2.1 39 21 | 3.1 50 32 | 3.8 62 42 | 4 73 53 | 4.2 83 63 | 4.2 86 66 | 3.3 84 64 | 3.1 78 56 | 3 66 45 | 3.7 51 33 | 2.8 38 22 |
- █ Average max. and min. temperatures in °F
- █ Precipitation totals in inches
- Source: The Weather Channel
Metric conversion
| J | F | M | A | M | J | J | A | S | O | N | D |
| 52 1 −8 | 53 4 −6 | 78 10 0 | 98 17 6 | 100 23 12 | 107 28 17 | 106 30 19 | 83 29 18 | 78 26 13 | 77 19 7 | 94 11 1 | 72 3 −6 |
- █ Average max. and min. temperatures in °C
- █ Precipitation totals in mm

In recent years, average temperatures in the county seat of Toledo have ranged from a low of 17 °F (−8 °C) in January to a high of 86 °F (30 °C) in July, although a record low of −23 °F (−31 °C) was recorded in January 1985 (jobs) and a record high of 111 °F (44 °C) was recorded in July 1954. Average monthly precipitation ranged from 2.03 inches (52 mm) in January to 4.21 inches (107 mm) in June.

=== Adjacent counties ===
- Coles County - north
- Clark County - east
- Jasper County - south
- Effingham County - southwest
- Shelby County - west

=== Transit ===
- Rides Mass Transit District

=== Major highways ===
- I-57
- I-70
- US 40
- US 45
- IL 49
- IL 121
- IL 130

== Demographics ==
Historical population
| Census | Pop. | Note | %± |
|---|---|---|---|
| 1850 | 3,718 | | — |
| 1860 | 8,311 | | 123.5% |
| 1870 | 12,223 | | 47.1% |
| 1880 | 13,759 | | 12.6% |
| 1890 | 15,443 | | 12.2% |
| 1900 | 16,124 | | 4.4% |
| 1910 | 14,281 | | −11.4% |
| 1920 | 12,858 | | −10.0% |
| 1930 | 10,419 | | −19.0% |
| 1940 | 11,698 | | 12.3% |
| 1950 | 10,496 | | −10.3% |
| 1960 | 9,936 | | −5.3% |
| 1970 | 9,772 | | −1.7% |
| 1980 | 11,062 | | 13.2% |
| 1990 | 10,670 | | −3.5% |
| 2000 | 11,253 | | 5.5% |
| 2010 | 11,048 | | −1.8% |
| 2020 | 10,450 | | −5.4% |
| 2025 (est.) | 10,208 | ▼ | −2.3% |
U.S. Decennial Census; 1790-1960 1900-1990; 1990-2000 2010

2000 census age pyramid for Cumberland County

=== 2020 census ===
As of the 2020 census, the county had a population of 10,450. The median age was 42.8 years. 22.9% of residents were under the age of 18 and 20.7% of residents were 65 years of age or older. For every 100 females there were 99.1 males, and for every 100 females age 18 and over there were 98.1 males age 18 and over.

The racial makeup of the county was 95.5% White, 0.3% Black or African American, 0.2% American Indian and Alaska Native, 0.2% Asian, <0.1% Native Hawaiian and Pacific Islander, 0.3% from some other race, and 3.4% from two or more races. Hispanic or Latino residents of any race comprised 1.1% of the population.

<0.1% of residents lived in urban areas, while 100.0% lived in rural areas.

There were 4,276 households in the county, of which 29.0% had children under the age of 18 living in them. Of all households, 55.4% were married-couple households, 17.4% were households with a male householder and no spouse or partner present, and 20.6% were households with a female householder and no spouse or partner present. About 26.7% of all households were made up of individuals and 12.9% had someone living alone who was 65 years of age or older.

There were 4,728 housing units, of which 9.6% were vacant. Among occupied housing units, 83.2% were owner-occupied and 16.8% were renter-occupied. The homeowner vacancy rate was 0.9% and the rental vacancy rate was 8.8%.

=== 2010 census ===
As of the 2010 United States census, there were 11,048 people, 4,377 households, and 3,121 families living in the county. The population density was 31.9 inhabitants per square mile (12.3/km^{2}). There were 4,874 housing units at an average density of 14.1 per square mile (5.4/km^{2}). The racial makeup of the county was 98.3% white, 0.3% black or African American, 0.2% Asian, 0.2% American Indian, 0.2% from other races, and 0.8% from two or more races. Those of Hispanic or Latino origin made up 0.7% of the population. In terms of ancestry, 30.6% were German, 17.4% were American, 11.7% were Irish, and 11.4% were English.

Of the 4,377 households, 31.3% had children under the age of 18 living with them, 57.7% were married couples living together, 8.6% had a female householder with no husband present, 28.7% were non-families, and 24.3% of all households were made up of individuals. The average household size was 2.50 and the average family size was 2.95. The median age was 40.9 years.

The median income for a household in the county was $42,101 and the median income for a family was $51,729. Males had a median income of $42,157 versus $29,142 for females. The per capita income for the county was $21,262. About 8.1% of families and 12.5% of the population were below the poverty line, including 19.4% of those under age 18 and 8.2% of those age 65 or over.

== Communities ==
=== Cities ===
- Neoga
- Casey (mostly in Clark County)

=== Villages ===
- Greenup
- Jewett
- Montrose (mostly in Effingham County)
- Toledo (seat)

=== Townships ===
Cumberland County is divided into eight townships:

- Cottonwood
- Crooked Creek
- Greenup
- Neoga
- Spring Point
- Sumpter
- Union
- Woodbury

=== Census-designated place ===
- Janesville

=== Unincorporated communities ===
- Bradbury
- Hazel Dell
- Janesville
- Johnstown
- Liberty Hill
- Lillyville
- Maple Point
- Neal
- Roslyn
- Timothy
- Union Center
- Vevay Park
- Walla Walla
- Woodbury

== Education ==
The following school districts have territory in Cumberland County:

- Neoga Community Unit School District 3
- Cumberland Community Unit School District 77
- Casey-Westfield Community Unit School District 4C
- Charleston Community Unit School District 1
- Dieterich Community Unit School District 30
- Jasper County Community Unit School District 1
- Mattoon Community Unit School District 2
- Teutopolis Community Unit School District 50

== Politics ==
Although predominantly Democratic in the years before World War I, in the aftermath of which Woodrow Wilson's policies towards Germany were locally deplored, Cumberland County has since become powerfully Republican. Even in Franklin D. Roosevelt's 1932 and 1936 landslides, he won only small victories, and since then only three Democrats have carried the county. Bill Clinton, who won a plurality in 1992, is the last Democrat to reach forty percent of the county's vote, and in 2016, the rapid Upland South trend towards overwhelmingly Republican voting caused his wife Hillary to win less than twenty percent of the county's ballots.

United States presidential election results for Cumberland County, Illinois
| Year | Republican | | Democratic | | Third party(ies) | |
| Year | No. | % | No. | % | No. | % |
|---|---|---|---|---|---|---|
| 1892 | 1,470 | 41.18% | 1,785 | 50.00% | 315 | 8.82% |
| 1896 | 1,856 | 46.52% | 2,098 | 52.58% | 36 | 0.90% |
| 1900 | 1,870 | 47.61% | 1,993 | 50.74% | 65 | 1.65% |
| 1904 | 1,857 | 50.39% | 1,644 | 44.61% | 184 | 4.99% |
| 1908 | 1,739 | 47.66% | 1,810 | 49.60% | 100 | 2.74% |
| 1912 | 990 | 28.78% | 1,673 | 48.63% | 777 | 22.59% |
| 1916 | 2,879 | 48.20% | 2,960 | 49.56% | 134 | 2.24% |
| 1920 | 3,095 | 58.18% | 2,162 | 40.64% | 63 | 1.18% |
| 1924 | 2,698 | 51.09% | 2,384 | 45.14% | 199 | 3.77% |
| 1928 | 3,242 | 63.04% | 1,873 | 36.42% | 28 | 0.54% |
| 1932 | 2,166 | 40.68% | 3,128 | 58.75% | 30 | 0.56% |
| 1936 | 3,016 | 47.45% | 3,290 | 51.76% | 50 | 0.79% |
| 1940 | 3,330 | 51.62% | 3,091 | 47.92% | 30 | 0.47% |
| 1944 | 2,700 | 52.88% | 2,391 | 46.83% | 15 | 0.29% |
| 1948 | 2,451 | 50.72% | 2,353 | 48.70% | 28 | 0.58% |
| 1952 | 3,302 | 59.88% | 2,200 | 39.90% | 12 | 0.22% |
| 1956 | 3,235 | 58.69% | 2,272 | 41.22% | 5 | 0.09% |
| 1960 | 3,020 | 54.91% | 2,475 | 45.00% | 5 | 0.09% |
| 1964 | 2,251 | 42.42% | 3,056 | 57.58% | 0 | 0.00% |
| 1968 | 2,671 | 53.12% | 1,828 | 36.36% | 529 | 10.52% |
| 1972 | 3,257 | 60.79% | 2,083 | 38.88% | 18 | 0.34% |
| 1976 | 2,518 | 47.12% | 2,752 | 51.50% | 74 | 1.38% |
| 1980 | 3,159 | 59.73% | 1,892 | 35.77% | 238 | 4.50% |
| 1984 | 3,002 | 63.04% | 1,733 | 36.39% | 27 | 0.57% |
| 1988 | 2,667 | 57.98% | 1,904 | 41.39% | 29 | 0.63% |
| 1992 | 1,860 | 35.76% | 2,111 | 40.58% | 1,231 | 23.66% |
| 1996 | 2,002 | 44.80% | 1,776 | 39.74% | 691 | 15.46% |
| 2000 | 2,964 | 59.58% | 1,870 | 37.59% | 141 | 2.83% |
| 2004 | 3,497 | 64.57% | 1,862 | 34.38% | 57 | 1.05% |
| 2008 | 3,156 | 59.11% | 2,055 | 38.49% | 128 | 2.40% |
| 2012 | 3,509 | 66.27% | 1,641 | 30.99% | 145 | 2.74% |
| 2016 | 4,206 | 75.50% | 1,031 | 18.51% | 334 | 6.00% |
| 2020 | 4,601 | 78.66% | 1,142 | 19.52% | 106 | 1.81% |
| 2024 | 4,627 | 79.89% | 1,059 | 18.28% | 106 | 1.83% |

== See also ==
- National Register of Historic Places listings in Cumberland County, Illinois
