= Johnstown, Illinois =

- Unincorporated community
- Location within Illinois Location within the United States
- Coordinates: 39°21′48″N 88°17′13″W
- Country: United States
- State: Illinois
- County: Cumberland
- Elevation: 623 ft (190 m)
- Time zone: UTC-6 (Central (CST))
  - Summer (DST): UTC-5 (CDT)
- Area code: 217
- GNIS feature ID: 411190

Johnstown is an unincorporated community in Cumberland County, Illinois, United States. Johnstown is 6.5 miles (10.5 km) north-northwest of Toledo. In which is also the oldest settlement in Cumberland County, Illinois.
