= St. Francis Township, Effingham County, Illinois =

Saint Francis Township
- Township
- Location in Effingham County

- Effingham County's location in Illinois
- Coordinates: 39°08′N 88°24′W
- Country: United States
- State: Illinois
- County: Effingham
- Established: November 6, 1860

Area
  - Total: 32.38 sq mi (83.9 km^{2})
  - Land: 32.38 sq mi (83.9 km^{2})
  - Water: 0 sq mi (0 km^{2}) 0%
- Elevation: 581 ft (177 m)

Population (2020)
  - Total: 1,194
  - Density: 36.87/sq mi (14.24/km^{2})
- Time zone: UTC-6 (CST)
  - Summer (DST): UTC-5 (CDT)
- ZIP codes: 62445, 62467
- FIPS code: 17-049-66807

Saint Francis Township is one of fifteen townships in Effingham County, Illinois, USA. As of the 2020 census, its population was 1,194 and it contained 479 housing units.

== Geography ==
According to the 2021 census gazetteer files, St. Francis Township (T8N R7E) has a total area of 32.38 square miles (83.9 km^{2}), all land.

=== Cities, towns, villages ===
- Montrose (southwest three-quarters)
- Teutopolis (east edge)

=== Major highways ===
- Interstate 70
- U.S. Route 40
- Illinois Route 33

== Demographics ==
Historical population
| Census | Pop. | Note | %± |
|---|---|---|---|
| 1870 | 509 | | — |
| 1880 | 828 | | 62.7% |
| 1890 | 897 | | 8.3% |
| 1900 | 926 | | 3.2% |
| 1910 | 896 | | −3.2% |
| 1920 | 931 | | 3.9% |
| 1930 | 859 | | −7.7% |
| 1940 | 925 | | 7.7% |
| 1950 | 925 | | 0.0% |
| 1960 | 952 | | 2.9% |
| 1970 | 993 | | 4.3% |
| 1980 | 1,200 | | 20.8% |
| 1990 | 1,263 | | 5.3% |
| 2000 | 1,330 | | 5.3% |
| 2010 | 1,213 | | −8.8% |
| 2020 | 1,194 | | −1.6% |
U.S. Decennial Census

As of the 2020 census there were 1,194 people, 448 households, and 376 families residing in the township. The population density was 36.88 inhabitants per square mile (14.24/km^{2}). There were 479 housing units at an average density of 14.80 per square mile (5.71/km^{2}). The racial makeup of the township was 95.56% White, 0.08% African American, 0.00% Native American, 0.92% Asian, 0.00% Pacific Islander, 0.25% from other races, and 3.18% from two or more races. Hispanic or Latino of any race were 1.26% of the population.

According to the 2020 American Community Survey, there were 448 households, out of which 46.70% had children under the age of 18 living with them, 67.19% were married couples living together, 14.51% had a female householder with no spouse present, and 16.07% were non-families. 11.40% of all households were made up of individuals, and 3.30% had someone living alone who was 65 years of age or older. The average household size was 3.11 and the average family size was 3.41.

The township's age distribution consisted of 27.9% under the age of 18, 9.9% from 18 to 24, 29.8% from 25 to 44, 20.3% from 45 to 64, and 12.0% who were 65 years of age or older. The median age was 33.3 years. For every 100 females, there were 113.2 males. For every 100 females age 18 and over, there were 99.6 males.

The median income for a household in the township was $84,091, and the median income for a family was $91,389. Males had a median income of $43,561 versus $51,696 for females. The per capita income for the township was $33,969. About 2.4% of families and 4.0% of the population were below the poverty line, including 3.6% of those under age 18 and 0.0% of those age 65 or over.

== School districts ==
- Dieterich Community Unit School District 30
- Teutopolis Community Unit School District 50

== Political districts ==
- Illinois' 19th congressional district
- State House District 109
- State Senate District 55
