= Neoga, Illinois =

- City
- Motto: "Neoga Naturally"
- Location of Neoga in Cumberland County, Illinois.
- Coordinates: 39°19′18″N 88°27′01″W
- Country: United States
- State: Illinois
- County: Cumberland
- Township: Neoga
- Founded: 1856

Area
  - Total: 1.39 sq mi (3.60 km^{2})
  - Land: 1.39 sq mi (3.60 km^{2})
  - Water: 0 sq mi (0.00 km^{2})
- Elevation: 659 ft (201 m)

Population (2020)
  - Total: 1,398
  - Density: 1,005.6/sq mi (388.25/km^{2})
- Time zone: UTC-6 (CST)
  - Summer (DST): UTC-5 (CDT)
- ZIP code: 62447
- Area code: 217
- FIPS code: 17-51986
- GNIS ID: 2395170
- Website: www.neoga.org

Neoga is a city in Cumberland County, Illinois, United States. The population was 1,398 at the 2020 census, down from 1,636 at the 2010 census. It is part of the Charleston–Mattoon Micropolitan Statistical Area.

Neoga was incorporated in 1856. Neoga has two possible origins for its name. The first origin is that the town name directly means "deer" in the Kickapoo language. The second origin is that Neoga comes from an Iroquois word meaning "place of the deity".

== Geography ==
Neoga is located in northwestern Cumberland County. U.S. Route 45 runs through the center of town as Oak Avenue, and Interstate 57 crosses the eastern side of town, with access from Exit 177, where it crosses US 45. Effingham is 14 miles (23 km) to the south, and Mattoon is 13 miles (21 km) to the north.

According to the 2021 census gazetteer files, Neoga has a total area of 1.39 square miles (3.60 km^{2}), all land.

== Demographics ==
Historical population
Census	Pop.	Note	%±
1890	829		—
1900	1,126		35.8%
1910	1,074		−4.6%
1920	1,149		7.0%
1930	995		−13.4%
1940	1,062		6.7%
1950	1,125		5.9%
1960	1,145		1.8%
1970	1,270		10.9%
1980	1,736		36.7%
1990	1,678		−3.3%
2000	1,854		10.5%
2010	1,636		−11.8%
2020	1,398		−14.5%
U.S. Decennial Census

=== 2020 census ===
As of the 2020 census, Neoga had a population of 1,398. The median age was 42.3 years. 23.3% of residents were under the age of 18 and 23.5% of residents were 65 years of age or older. For every 100 females, there were 81.6 males, and for every 100 females age 18 and over, there were 81.4 males age 18 and over.

There were 554 households in Neoga, of which 31.9% had children under the age of 18 living in them. Of all households, 50.9% were married-couple households, 13.4% were households with a male householder and no spouse or partner present, and 29.1% were households with a female householder and no spouse or partner present. About 28.5% of all households were made up of individuals and 13.3% had someone living alone who was 65 years of age or older. As of the 2020 census, there were also 337 families residing in the city.

There were 616 housing units, of which 10.1% were vacant. The homeowner vacancy rate was 0.0% and the rental vacancy rate was 14.6%. The population density was 1,005.76 inhabitants per square mile (388.33/km^{2}), and there were 616 housing units at an average density of 443.17 per square mile (171.11/km^{2}).

0.0% of residents lived in urban areas, while 100.0% lived in rural areas.

Racial composition as of the 2020 census
Race	Number	Percent
White	1,313	93.9%
Black or African American	10	0.7%
American Indian and Alaska Native	4	0.3%
Asian	4	0.3%
Native Hawaiian and Other Pacific Islander	1	0.1%
Some other race	13	0.9%
Two or more races	53	3.8%
Hispanic or Latino (of any race)	27	1.9%

=== Income and poverty ===
The median income for a household in the city was $50,694, and the median income for a family was $82,813. Males had a median income of $44,881 versus $26,719 for females. The per capita income for the city was $23,353. About 9.5% of families and 12.1% of the population were below the poverty line, including 8.6% of those under age 18 and 18.9% of those age 65 or over.

== Government ==
The Neoga City Council, composed of four councilmen and the mayor, serve as the administrative authority for the Neoga municipal government.

The City of Neoga employs 3 full-time police officers and multiple part-time police officers. Neoga is afforded fire protection services through the volunteer efforts of the Neoga Fire Protection District. The city is currently classified with a fire insurance rating of 6.

Emergency medical care is available 24 hours a day through Sarah Bush Lincoln Health Center located 15 miles northeast or through St. Anthony Memorial Hospital located 14 miles south of Neoga. The city's medical needs are also served through the Sarah Bush Neoga Medical Center, which provides modern medical diagnostic testing and routine medical care for city residents. Emergency medical ambulance transportation is provided through the fire district.

=== Community facilities ===
Neoga is a community strongly tied to the early development of central Illinois’ railroad industry. A progressive community, Neoga hosts a variety of social events, with the largest banquet facility having a capacity of 150 persons.

Neoga hosts a strong banking and finance industry, with First Mid Bank and Trust and First Neighbor Bank having locations within Neoga. These locally managed, regional banks, with assets in excess of $600,000,000 are capable of assisting in any development projects requiring capital investment. The Neoga News, a community newspaper, is published weekly and features news and sports coverage of interest to area residents.

The City of Neoga provides a variety of recreational facilities, with public parks featuring tennis and basketball courts. In addition to several area lakes with swimming, boating and water sports. For the avid outdoors person, nearby Fox Ridge and Lincoln Trail State Parks offer camping, hiking, snowmobiling, walking paths and horseback riding.

The Neoga District Library, located in downtown Neoga, affords residents with access to the latest resource materials, computers and technical services.

== Education ==
Neoga is home to Neoga Community Unit School District 3 which contains an elementary school and a junior-senior high school. Sports teams have the nickname "Indians".

Lake Land College, located 12 miles north of the City of Neoga, offers access to higher education and workforce training programs.

Eastern Illinois University in Charleston (25 miles north-east) provides students access to educational programs leading to bachelor's and master's degrees in a variety of academic programs.
