= Jewett, Illinois =

- Village
- Location of Jewett in Cumberland County, Illinois.
- Coordinates: 39°12′28″N 88°14′35″W
- Country: United States
- State: Illinois
- County: Cumberland
- Township: Woodbury

Area
  - Total: 1.00 sq mi (2.60 km^{2})
  - Land: 1.00 sq mi (2.60 km^{2})
  - Water: 0 sq mi (0.00 km^{2})
- Elevation: 584 ft (178 m)

Population (2020)
  - Total: 196
  - Density: 195.1/sq mi (75.32/km^{2})
- Time zone: UTC-6 (CST)
  - Summer (DST): UTC-5 (CDT)
- ZIP code: 62436
- Area code: 217
- FIPS code: 17-38427
- GNIS ID: 2398303

Jewett is a village in Cumberland County, Illinois, United States. The population was 196 at the 2020 census. It is part of the Charleston–Mattoon Micropolitan Statistical Area.

== Geography ==
Jewett is located in south-central Cumberland County along the route of the former National Road. U.S. Route 40 now runs through the northern part of the village, leading northeast 5 miles (8 km) to Greenup and southwest 8 miles (13 km) to Montrose. Interstate 70 passes to the north of the village, with access at Greenup and Montrose.

According to the 2010 census, Jewett has a total area of 1 square mile (2.59 km^{2}), all land.

== Demographics ==
Historical population
Census	Pop.	Note	%±
1880	138		—
1890	335		142.8%
1900	322		−3.9%
1910	366		13.7%
1920	243		−33.6%
1930	230		−5.3%
1940	204		−11.3%
1950	253		24.0%
1960	238		−5.9%
1970	211		−11.3%
1980	230		9.0%
1990	194		−15.7%
2000	232		19.6%
2010	223		−3.9%
2020	196		−12.1%
U.S. Decennial Census

As of the 2020 census there were 196 people, 103 households, and 90 families residing in the village. The population density was 195.02 inhabitants per square mile (75.30/km^{2}). There were 89 housing units at an average density of 88.56 per square mile (34.19/km^{2}). The racial makeup of the village was 94.90% White, 1.53% Native American, and 3.57% from two or more races. Hispanic or Latino of any race were 1.53% of the population.

There were 103 households, out of which 26.2% had children under the age of 18 living with them, 72.82% were married couples living together, 5.83% had a female householder with no husband present, and 12.62% were non-families. 12.62% of all households were made up of individuals, and 6.80% had someone living alone who was 65 years of age or older. The average household size was 2.63 and the average family size was 2.73.

The village's age distribution consisted of 18.9% under the age of 18, 5.7% from 18 to 24, 19.5% from 25 to 44, 31.3% from 45 to 64, and 24.6% who were 65 years of age or older. The median age was 52.0 years. For every 100 females, there were 82.5 males. For every 100 females aged 18 and over, there were 96.6 males.

The median income for a household in the village was $48,393, and the median income for a family was $52,750. Males had a median income of $38,281 versus $14,063 for females. The per capita income for the village was $18,848. About 10.0% of families and 13.3% of the population were below the poverty line, including 15.7% of those under age 18 and none of those age 65 or over.

== Education ==
Students in Jewett attend Cumberland Community Unit School District 77. The elementary, middle, and high schools are located in Toledo.
