= Noble, Illinois =

Noble
- Village
- Location of Noble in Richland County, Illinois.
- Coordinates: 38°41′51″N 88°13′24″W
- Country: United States
- State: Illinois
- County: Richland

Area
  - Total: 1.02 sq mi (2.65 km^{2})
  - Land: 1.02 sq mi (2.63 km^{2})
  - Water: 0.0039 sq mi (0.01 km^{2})
- Elevation: 476 ft (145 m)

Population (2020)
  - Total: 633
  - Density: 622.4/sq mi (240.32/km^{2})
- Time zone: UTC-6 (CST)
  - Summer (DST): UTC-5 (CDT)
- ZIP code: 62868
- Area code: 618
- FIPS code: 17–53143
- GNIS feature ID: 2399500
- Website: http://www.nobleillinois.com/

Noble is a village in Richland County, Illinois, United States. As of the 2020 census, Noble had a population of 633.

== Geography ==
According to the 2010 census, Noble has a total area of 1.025 square miles (2.65 km^{2}), of which 1.02 square miles (2.64 km^{2}) (or 99.51%) is land and 0.005 square miles (0.01 km^{2}) (or 0.49%) is water.

== Demographics ==
Historical population
Census	Pop.	Note	%±
1860	127		—
1870	380		199.2%
1880	502		32.1%
1900	424		—
1910	618		45.8%
1920	580		−6.1%
1930	473		−18.4%
1940	855		80.8%
1950	776		−9.2%
1960	761		−1.9%
1970	719		−5.5%
1980	832		15.7%
1990	756		−9.1%
2000	746		−1.3%
2010	677		−9.2%
2020	633		−6.5%
U.S. Decennial Census

As of the census of 2000, there were 746 people, 318 households, and 213 families residing in the village. The population density was 728.7 inhabitants per square mile (281.4/km^{2}). There were 363 housing units at an average density of 354.6 units per square mile (136.9 units/km^{2}). The racial makeup of the village was 99.06% White, 0.27% Asian, 0.13% from other races, and 0.54% from two or more races. Hispanic or Latino people of any race were 1.07% of the population.

There were 318 households, out of which 30.8% had children under the age of 18 living with them, 51.6% were married couples living together, 11.3% had a female householder with no husband present, and 33.0% were non-families. 28.6% of all households were made up of individuals, and 16.0% had someone living alone who was 65 years of age or older. The average household size was 2.35 and the average family size was 2.91.

In the village, the population was spread out, with 25.9% under the age of 18, 8.4% from 18 to 24, 27.7% from 25 to 44, 21.6% from 45 to 64, and 16.4% who were 65 years of age or older. The median age was 36 years. For every 100 females, there were 96.8 males. For every 100 females age 18 and over, there were 89.4 males.

The median income for a household in the village was $28,828, and the median income for a family was $36,667. Males had a median income of $25,862 versus $20,813 for females. The per capita income for the village was $14,290. About 13.3% of families and 18.6% of the population were below the poverty line, including 32.2% of those under age 18 and 18.6% of those age 65 or over.
