= Montrose, Illinois =

- Village
- Location of Montrose in Cumberland County, Illinois.
- Coordinates: 39°10′05″N 88°22′31″W
- Country: United States
- State: Illinois
- County: Effingham, Cumberland
- Townships: St. Francis, Spring Point

Area
  - Total: 0.64 sq mi (1.65 km^{2})
  - Land: 0.64 sq mi (1.65 km^{2})
  - Water: 0 sq mi (0.00 km^{2})
- Elevation: 600 ft (180 m)

Population (2020)
  - Total: 210
  - Density: 329.6/sq mi (127.27/km^{2})
- Time zone: UTC-6 (CST)
  - Summer (DST): UTC-5 (CDT)
- ZIP Code(s): 62445
- Area code: 217
- FIPS code: 17-50283
- GNIS ID: 2399391

Montrose is a village in Effingham and Cumberland counties in the U.S. state of Illinois. The population was 210 at the 2020 census. The Effingham County portion of Montrose is part of the Effingham Micropolitan Statistical Area, while the small section that lies in Cumberland County is part of the Charleston–Mattoon Micropolitan Statistical Area.

== Geography ==
Montrose mostly lies in northern Effingham County, although a small portion extends into southern Cumberland County. In the 2000 census, all of Montrose's 257 residents lived in Effingham County.

U.S. Route 40, following the route of the former National Road, passes through the village, leading northeast 13 miles (21 km) to Greenup and southwest 9 miles (14 km) to Effingham. Interstate 70 passes through the northern side of the village, with access from Exit 105.

According to the 2010 census, Montrose has a total area of 0.69 square miles (1.79 km^{2}), all land.

== Demographics ==
Historical population
Census	Pop.	Note	%±
1900	300		—
1910	347		15.7%
1920	334		−3.7%
1930	309		−7.5%
1940	334		8.1%
1950	309		−7.5%
1960	320		3.6%
1970	312		−2.5%
1980	321		2.9%
1990	306		−4.7%
2000	257		−16.0%
2010	201		−21.8%
2020	210		4.5%
U.S. Decennial Census

As of the 2020 census there were 210 people, 91 households, and 61 families residing in the village. The population density was 329.67 inhabitants per square mile (127.29/km^{2}). There were 101 housing units at an average density of 158.56 per square mile (61.22/km^{2}). The racial makeup of the village was 89.52% White, 4.29% Asian, 0.48% from other races, and 5.71% from two or more races. Hispanic or Latino of any race were 3.81% of the population.

There were 91 households, out of which 24.2% had children under the age of 18 living with them, 56.04% were married couples living together, 7.69% had a female householder with no husband present, and 32.97% were non-families. 27.47% of all households were made up of individuals, and 5.49% had someone living alone who was 65 years of age or older. The average household size was 2.72 and the average family size was 2.22.

The village's age distribution consisted of 15.3% under the age of 18, 16.3% from 18 to 24, 20.4% from 25 to 44, 30.1% from 45 to 64, and 17.8% who were 65 years of age or older. The median age was 39.5 years. For every 100 females, there were 117.2 males. For every 100 females age 18 and over, there were 103.6 males.

The median income for a household in the village was $45,469, and the median income for a family was $49,688. Males had a median income of $35,179 versus $17,917 for females. The per capita income for the village was $21,355. About 14.8% of families and 22.3% of the population were below the poverty line, including 45.2% of those under age 18 and none of those age 65 or over.
