= Toledo, Illinois =

- City
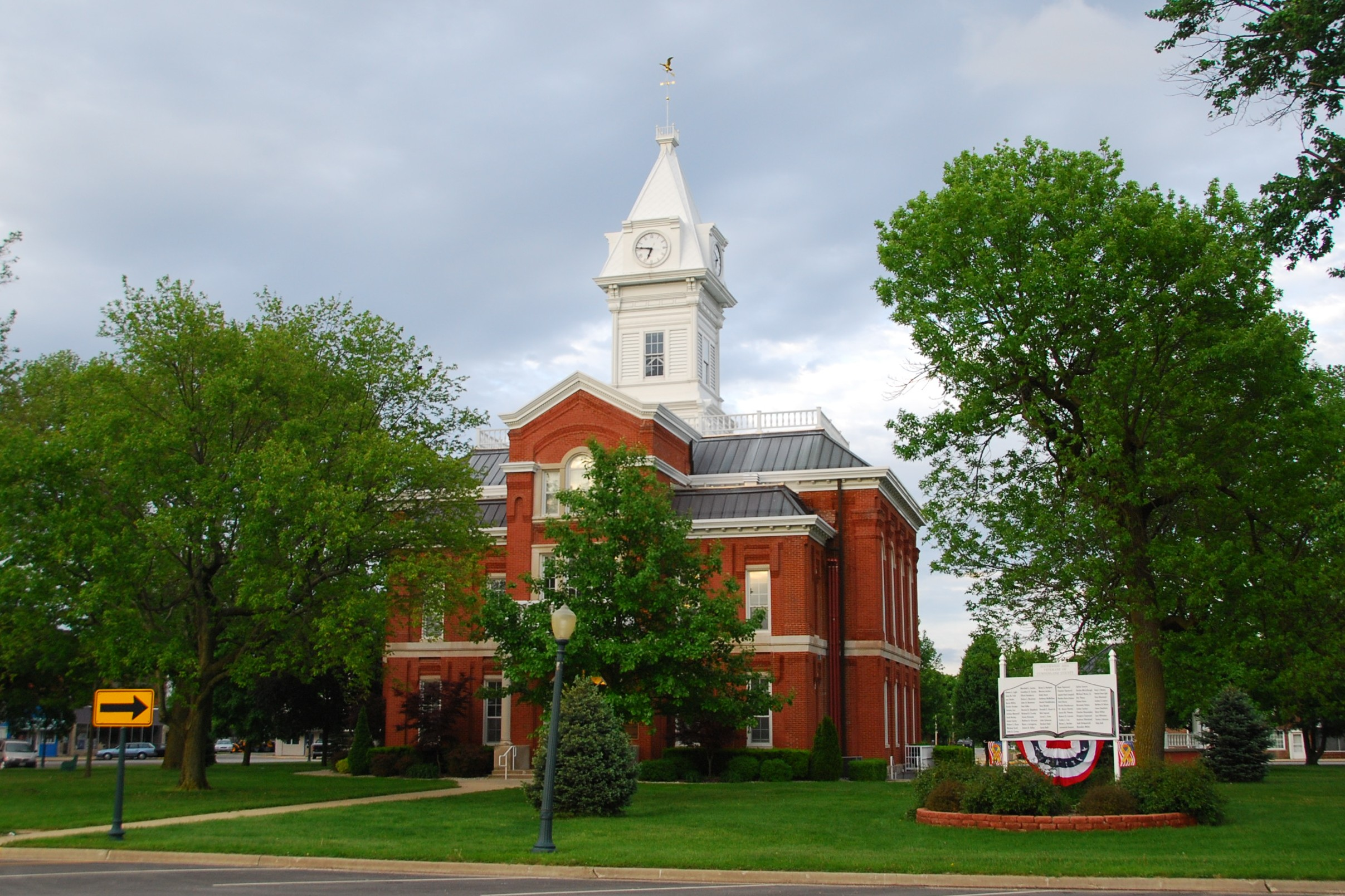
- Cumberland County Courthouse
- Interactive map of Toledo, Illinois
- Location within Illinois Location within the United States
- Coordinates: 39°16′23″N 88°14′52″W
- Country: United States
- State: Illinois
- County: Cumberland
- Township: Sumpter

Area
  - Total: 0.89 sq mi (2.30 km^{2})
  - Land: 0.89 sq mi (2.30 km^{2})
  - Water: 0 sq mi (0.00 km^{2})
- Elevation: 600 ft (180 m)

Population (2020)
  - Total: 1,161
  - Density: 1,307/sq mi (504.7/km^{2})
- Time zone: UTC-6 (CST)
  - Summer (DST): UTC-5 (CDT)
- ZIP code: 62468
- Area code: 217
- FIPS code: 17-75601
- GNIS ID: 2399991

Toledo is a small city and the county seat of Cumberland County, Illinois, United States. The population was 1,161 at the 2020 census.

Toledo is part of the Charleston–Mattoon Micropolitan Statistical Area.

== Geography ==
Toledo is located in the center of Cumberland County. Illinois Route 121 passes through the village, leading southeast 5 miles (8 km) to Greenup. Neoga is 14 miles (23 km) to the west.

According to the 2010 census, Toledo has a total area of 0.91 square miles (2.36 km^{2}), all land.

== Demographics ==
Historical population
Census	Pop.	Note	%±
1890	676		—
1900	818		21.0%
1910	900		10.0%
1920	787		−12.6%
1930	733		−6.9%
1940	852		16.2%
1950	905		6.2%
1960	998		10.3%
1970	1,068		7.0%
1980	1,284		20.2%
1990	1,199		−6.6%
2000	1,166		−2.8%
2010	1,238		6.2%
2020	1,161		−6.2%
U.S. Decennial Census

As of the 2020 census there were 1,161 people, 472 households, and 284 families residing in the village. The population density was 1,307.43 inhabitants per square mile (504.80/km^{2}). There were 556 housing units at an average density of 626.13 per square mile (241.75/km^{2}). The racial makeup of the village was 96.12% White, 0.09% African American, 0.17% Native American, 0.34% Asian, 0.34% from other races, and 2.93% from two or more races. Hispanic or Latino of any race were 1.12% of the population.

There were 472 households, out of which 26.3% had children under the age of 18 living with them, 51.91% were married couples living together, 5.08% had a female householder with no husband present, and 39.83% were non-families. 31.36% of all households were made up of individuals, and 22.67% had someone living alone who was 65 years of age or older. The average household size was 3.11 and the average family size was 2.44.

The village's age distribution consisted of 21.3% under the age of 18, 13.7% from 18 to 24, 22.8% from 25 to 44, 27.1% from 45 to 64, and 15.0% who were 65 years of age or older. The median age was 35.4 years. For every 100 females, there were 97.1 males. For every 100 females age 18 and over, there were 101.5 males.

The median income for a household in the village was $51,364, and the median income for a family was $69,107. Males had a median income of $36,875 versus $29,750 for females. The per capita income for the village was $24,696. About 10.6% of families and 13.2% of the population were below the poverty line, including 19.9% of those under age 18 and 12.0% of those age 65 or over.

== Education ==
Toledo is home to Cumberland Community Unit School District 77. The elementary, middle, and high school are located in Toledo.

== Notable people ==
- Grover Baichley (1889–1956), pitcher with the St. Louis Browns
