= Neoga Community Unit School District 3 =

School district in Illinois, United States

Location
- Neoga, Illinois Cumberland County, Illinois United States

District information
- Type: Public Coed
- Grades: PreK–12
- President: Chuck Campbell
- Superintendent: Bill Fritcher
- Schools: Neoga Junior-Senior High School (6–12); Neoga Elementary School (PreK–5)

Students and staff
- Athletic conference: National Trail Conference
- District mascot: Indians
- Colors: Red; White

Other information
- Website: https://www.neoga.k12.il.us/

Neoga Community Unit School District 3 is a unified school district located in the central Illinois city of Neoga, for which the district is named. Neoga, in turn, is a city located in northwestern Cumberland County. The district is composed of two schools: one elementary school and one junior-senior high school compose the unified district. Education begins at Neoga Elementary School, where children in grades ranging from kindergarten to five are educated; the school also runs a prekindergarten program. The last branch of precollegiate education in the district takes place at the combined Neoga Junior/Senior High School, and students in grades six through twelve are taught in this facility. The district's mascot is the Indian.

== See also ==
- List of school districts in Illinois

== Bibliography ==
- GreatSchools.net Information on Neoga Cusd 3, retrieved 2008-6-15
