= Casey, Illinois =

- City
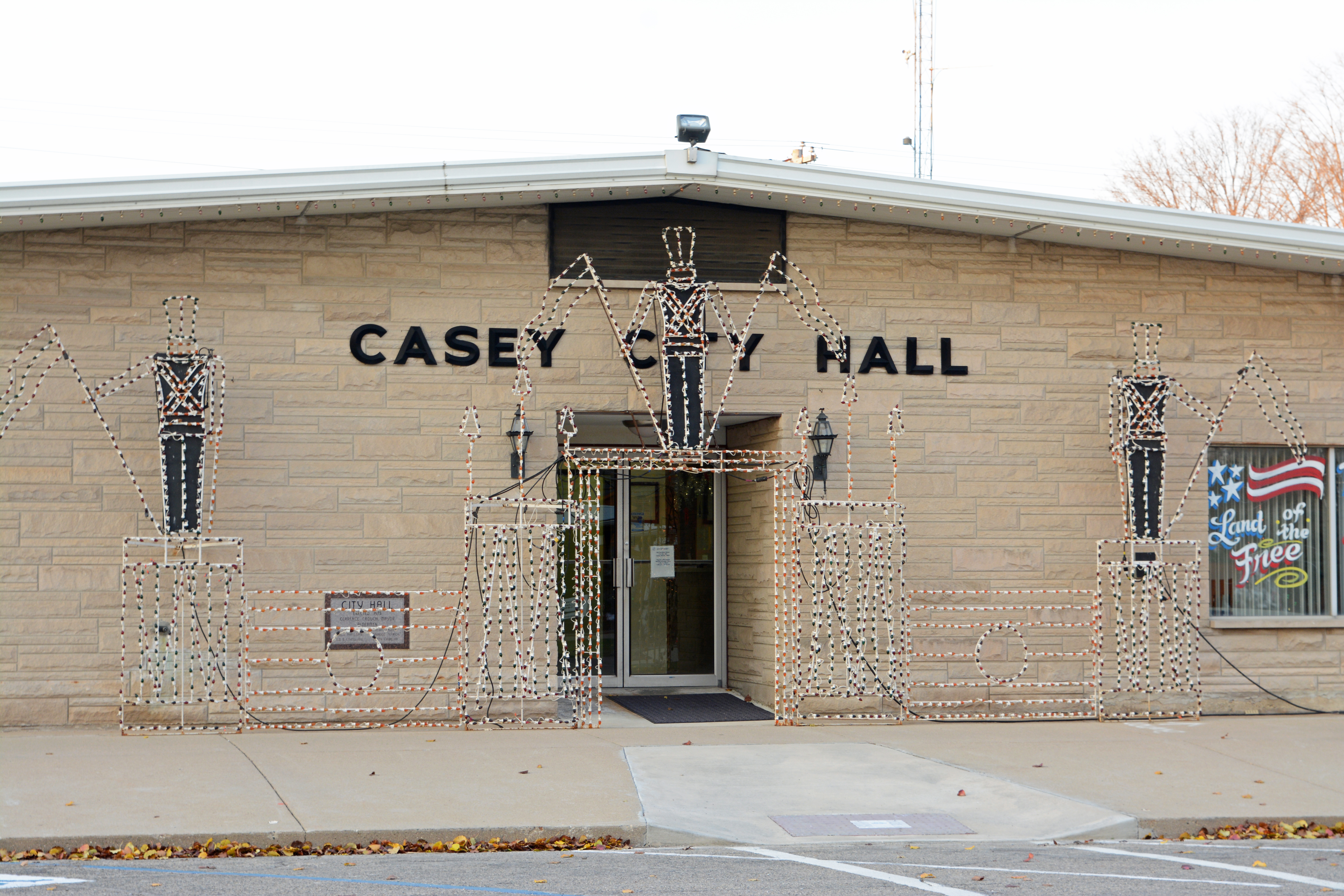
- Casey city hall
- Nickname: a Small Town with a Big Heart
- Location of Casey in Clark County, Illinois.
- Coordinates: 39°18′08″N 87°59′48″W
- Country: United States
- State: Illinois
- Counties: Clark, Cumberland
- Townships: Casey, Union

Government
  - Mayor: Mike Nichols

Area
  - Total: 2.64 sq mi (6.83 km^{2})
  - Land: 2.62 sq mi (6.79 km^{2})
  - Water: 0.015 sq mi (0.04 km^{2})
- Elevation: 653 ft (199 m)

Population (2020)
  - Total: 2,404
  - Density: 916.8/sq mi (353.96/km^{2})
- Time zone: UTC-6 (CST)
  - Summer (DST): UTC-5 (CDT)
- ZIP code: 62420
- Area code(s): 217, 447
- FIPS code: 17–11618
- GNIS feature ID: 2393765
- Website: http://www.cityofcaseyil.org/

Casey (/ˈkeɪzi/) is a city in Clark and Cumberland counties in the U.S. state of Illinois. The population was 2,404 at the 2020 census.

The Cumberland County portion of Casey is part of the Charleston–Mattoon Micropolitan Statistical Area.

Casey is noted for its outdoor sculptures listed as Guinness World Records for their size, including the Wind Chime, Rocking Chair, and more.

It also hosts the USA Softball of Illinois Hall of Fame Museum.

== Geography ==
Most of the city lies in Clark County, although a small portion extends into Cumberland County. In the 2000 census, 2,940 of Casey's 3067 residents (99.9%) lived in Clark County and 2 (0.1%) lived in Cumberland County.

According to the 2021 census gazetteer files, Casey has a total area of 2.26 square miles (5.85 km^{2}), all land.

=== Climate ===
Climate data for Casey, Illinois, 1991–2020 normals, extremes 1893–present
Month	Jan	Feb	Mar	Apr	May	Jun	Jul	Aug	Sep	Oct	Nov	Dec	Year
Record high °F (°C)	72 (22)	76 (24)	87 (31)	89 (32)	97 (36)	100 (38)	102 (39)	102 (39)	99 (37)	95 (35)	83 (28)	72 (22)	102 (39)
Mean daily maximum °F (°C)	37.5 (3.1)	42.5 (5.8)	53.2 (11.8)	65.2 (18.4)	75.9 (24.4)	84.0 (28.9)	87.7 (30.9)	86.3 (30.2)	80.8 (27.1)	68.7 (20.4)	54.1 (12.3)	42.1 (5.6)	64.8 (18.2)
Daily mean °F (°C)	28.4 (−2.0)	32.4 (0.2)	42.6 (5.9)	54.0 (12.2)	64.9 (18.3)	73.4 (23.0)	76.7 (24.8)	75.2 (24.0)	68.1 (20.1)	56.4 (13.6)	43.8 (6.6)	33.2 (0.7)	54.1 (12.3)
Mean daily minimum °F (°C)	19.3 (−7.1)	22.2 (−5.4)	32.0 (0.0)	42.8 (6.0)	53.9 (12.2)	62.7 (17.1)	65.7 (18.7)	64.0 (17.8)	55.4 (13.0)	44.1 (6.7)	33.4 (0.8)	24.3 (−4.3)	43.3 (6.3)
Record low °F (°C)	−22 (−30)	−22 (−30)	−4 (−20)	18 (−8)	28 (−2)	35 (2)	46 (8)	44 (7)	25 (−4)	17 (−8)	3 (−16)	−21 (−29)	−22 (−30)
Average precipitation inches (mm)	3.25 (83)	2.60 (66)	3.34 (85)	5.07 (129)	4.48 (114)	5.16 (131)	4.64 (118)	3.03 (77)	3.07 (78)	3.81 (97)	4.03 (102)	3.06 (78)	45.54 (1,158)
Average snowfall inches (cm)	5.0 (13)	1.9 (4.8)	1.4 (3.6)	0.1 (0.25)	0.0 (0.0)	0.0 (0.0)	0.0 (0.0)	0.0 (0.0)	0.0 (0.0)	0.0 (0.0)	0.3 (0.76)	3.2 (8.1)	11.9 (30.51)
Average precipitation days (≥ 0.01 in)	8.8	8.1	9.5	11.0	12.2	11.0	8.2	6.6	6.5	8.6	8.4	9.3	108.2
Average snowy days (≥ 0.1 in)	2.9	2.0	0.7	0.0	0.0	0.0	0.0	0.0	0.0	0.0	0.2	2.1	7.9
Source 1: NOAA
Source 2: National Weather Service

== Demographics ==
Historical population
Census	Pop.	Note	%±
1880	778		—
1890	844		8.5%
1900	1,500		77.7%
1910	2,157		43.8%
1920	2,189		1.5%
1930	2,200		0.5%
1940	2,543		15.6%
1950	2,734		7.5%
1960	2,890		5.7%
1970	2,994		3.6%
1980	3,026		1.1%
1990	2,914		−3.7%
2000	2,942		1.0%
2010	2,769		−5.9%
2020	2,404		−13.2%
U.S. Decennial Census

=== 2020 census ===
As of the 2020 census, Casey had a population of 2,404, with 1,054 households and 745 families residing in the city. The population density was 1,062.31 inhabitants per square mile (410.16/km^{2}). There were 1,233 housing units at an average density of 544.85 units per square mile (210.37 units/km^{2}).

The median age was 43.5 years. 21.5% of residents were under the age of 18 and 23.8% of residents were 65 years of age or older. For every 100 females there were 86.2 males, and for every 100 females age 18 and over there were 80.7 males age 18 and over.

0.0% of residents lived in urban areas, while 100.0% lived in rural areas.

Of the city's households, 26.7% had children under the age of 18 living in them. 41.7% were married-couple households, 19.1% were households with a male householder and no spouse or partner present, and 31.3% were households with a female householder and no spouse or partner present. About 35.4% of all households were made up of individuals, and 17.2% had someone living alone who was 65 years of age or older.

Of the 1,233 housing units, 14.5% were vacant. The homeowner vacancy rate was 4.2% and the rental vacancy rate was 9.5%.

Racial composition as of the 2020 census
Race	Number	Percent
White	2,315	96.3%
Black or African American	12	0.5%
American Indian and Alaska Native	2	0.1%
Asian	4	0.2%
Native Hawaiian and Other Pacific Islander	0	0.0%
Some other race	8	0.3%
Two or more races	63	2.6%
Hispanic or Latino (of any race)	43	1.8%

=== Income and poverty ===
The median income for a household in the city was $45,784, and the median income for a family was $52,310. Males had a median income of $37,592 versus $25,369 for females. The per capita income for the city was $26,020. About 7.8% of families and 8.1% of the population were below the poverty line, including 8.5% of those under age 18 and 5.3% of those age 65 or over.

=== African-Americans in Casey ===
Casey has a history as a sundown town. In 1906, an African-American hotel cook allegedly insulted a white girl. Authorities sent him out of town before a trial could be completed so as to prevent whites in Casey from lynching him. This precipitated the formation of a mob, reported the Alton Evening Telegraph, which "became furious and immediately started to free the city of the negro population." The paper wrote that this population was "given minutes to leave," continuing, "Casey is without a negro. In the future none will be permitted to stay more than a few hours."

Historian James Loewen attests that the only exception to this exclusion was nurse and midwife Elizabeth Davis (1887-1963) and her son. Davis was remembered for caring for patients during polio outbreaks and for being "the best midwife in Clark County". The townspeople of Casey called her "Nigger Liz". Drawing from oral histories, Loewen also writes that Casey erected a sign at the edge of town saying something along the lines of "Nigger, Don't Let the Sun Shine on Your Back in Casey".

== Education ==
The school district is Casey-Westfield Community Unit School District 4C.

== Big Things Small Town ==
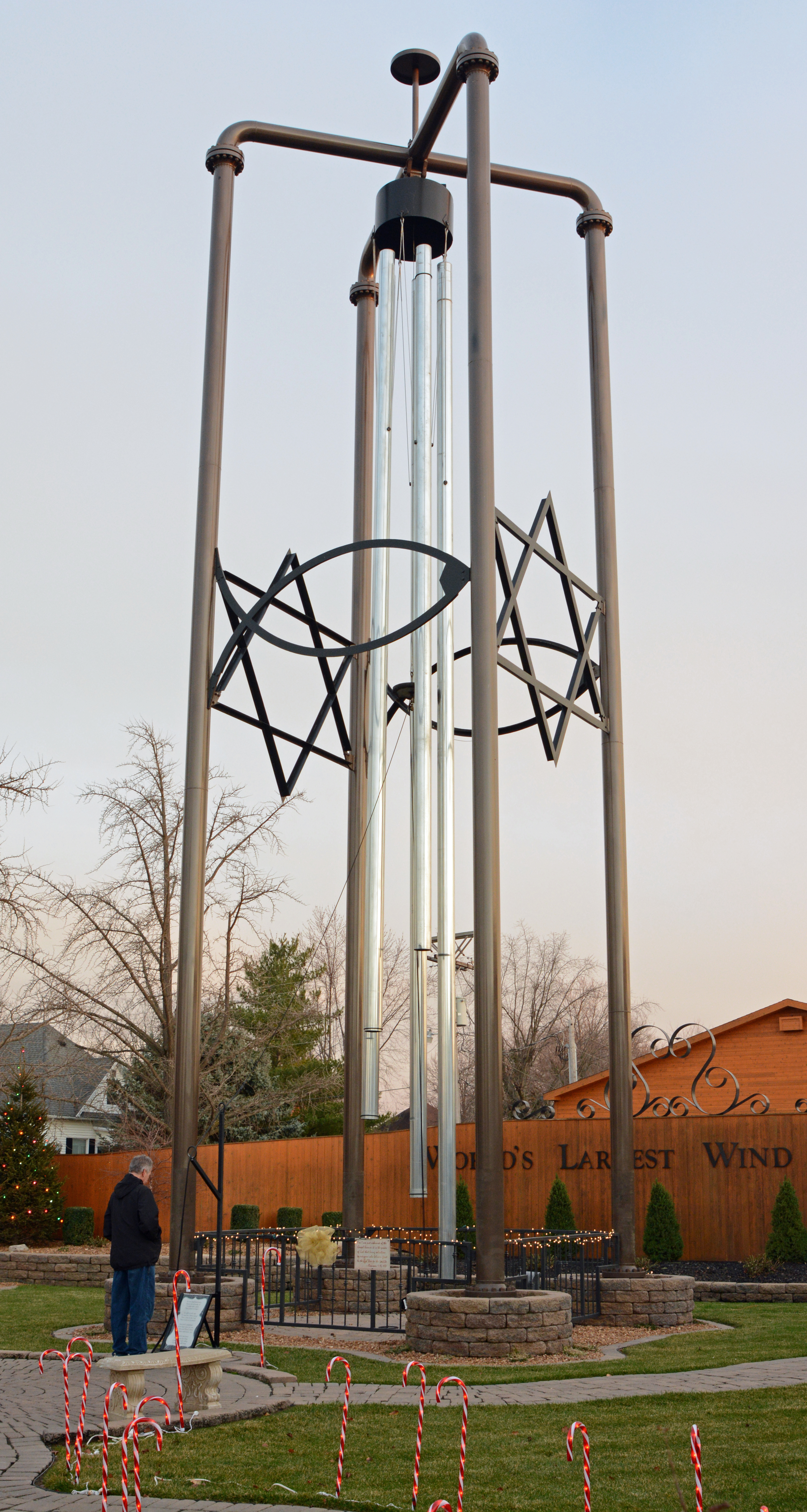
World's largest wind chime.

Casey is most known for its collection of "World's Largest" items.

Jim Bolin, a local craftsman and businessman, built fourteen things that have set Guinness World Records for their size:

1. World's Largest Wind Chime
2. World's Largest Golf Tee
3. World's Largest Pitchfork
4. World's Largest Rocking Chair
5. World's Largest Wooden Shoes
6. World's Largest Mailbox
7. World's Largest Gavel (currently in Marshall, IL)
8. World's Largest Truck Key
9. World's Largest Barbershop Pole
10. World's Largest Teeter Totter
11. World's Largest Golf Driver
12. World's Largest Swizzle Spoon

The other two have since been beaten: World's Largest Knitting Needles and World's Largest Crochet Hook.

Other notable "Big Things" present in Casety include The Big Ear of Corn, The Big Mousetrap, and The Big Pizza Slicer, among others.

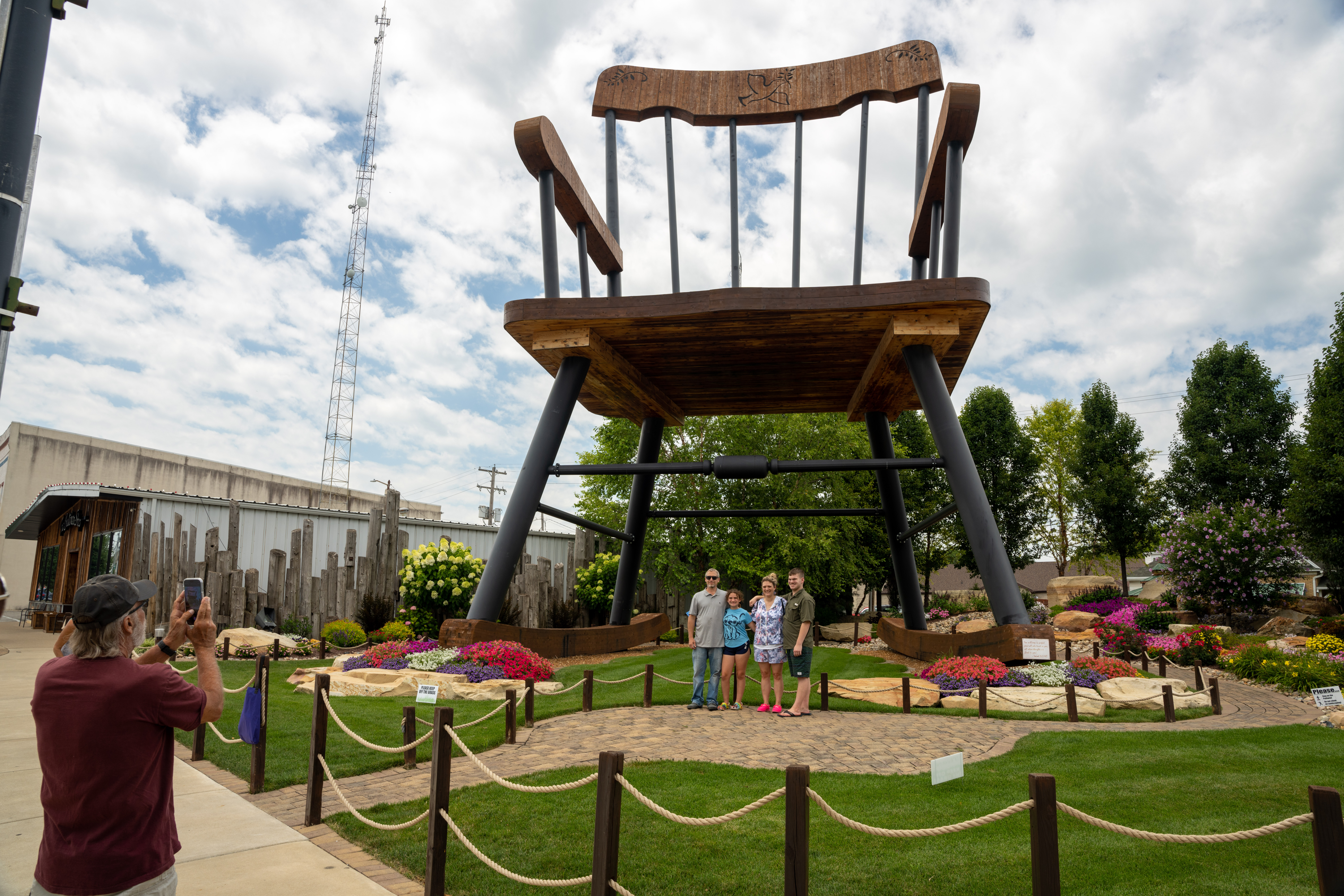
World's Largest Rocking Chair

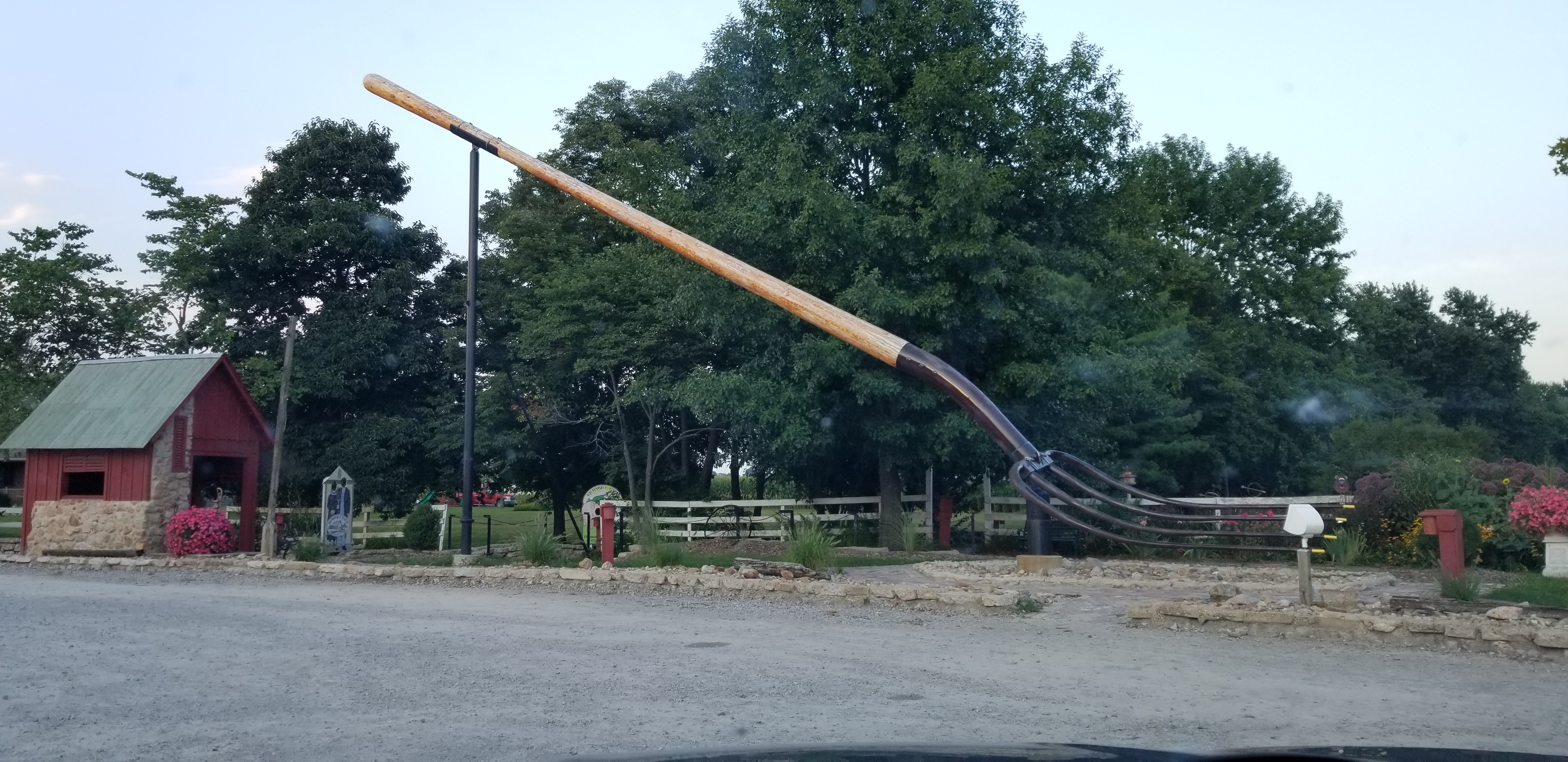
World's Largest Pitchfork

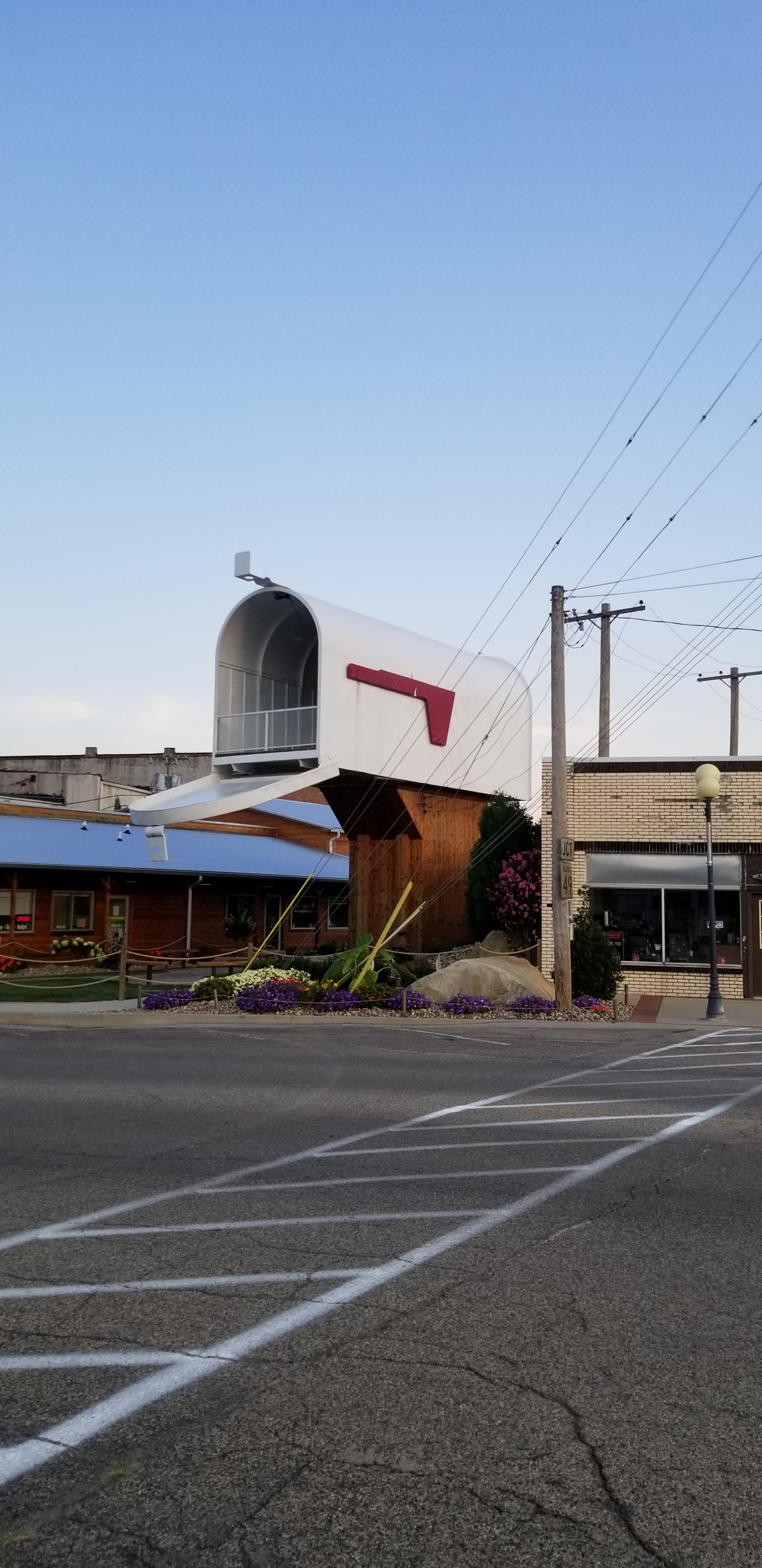
World's Largest Mailbox

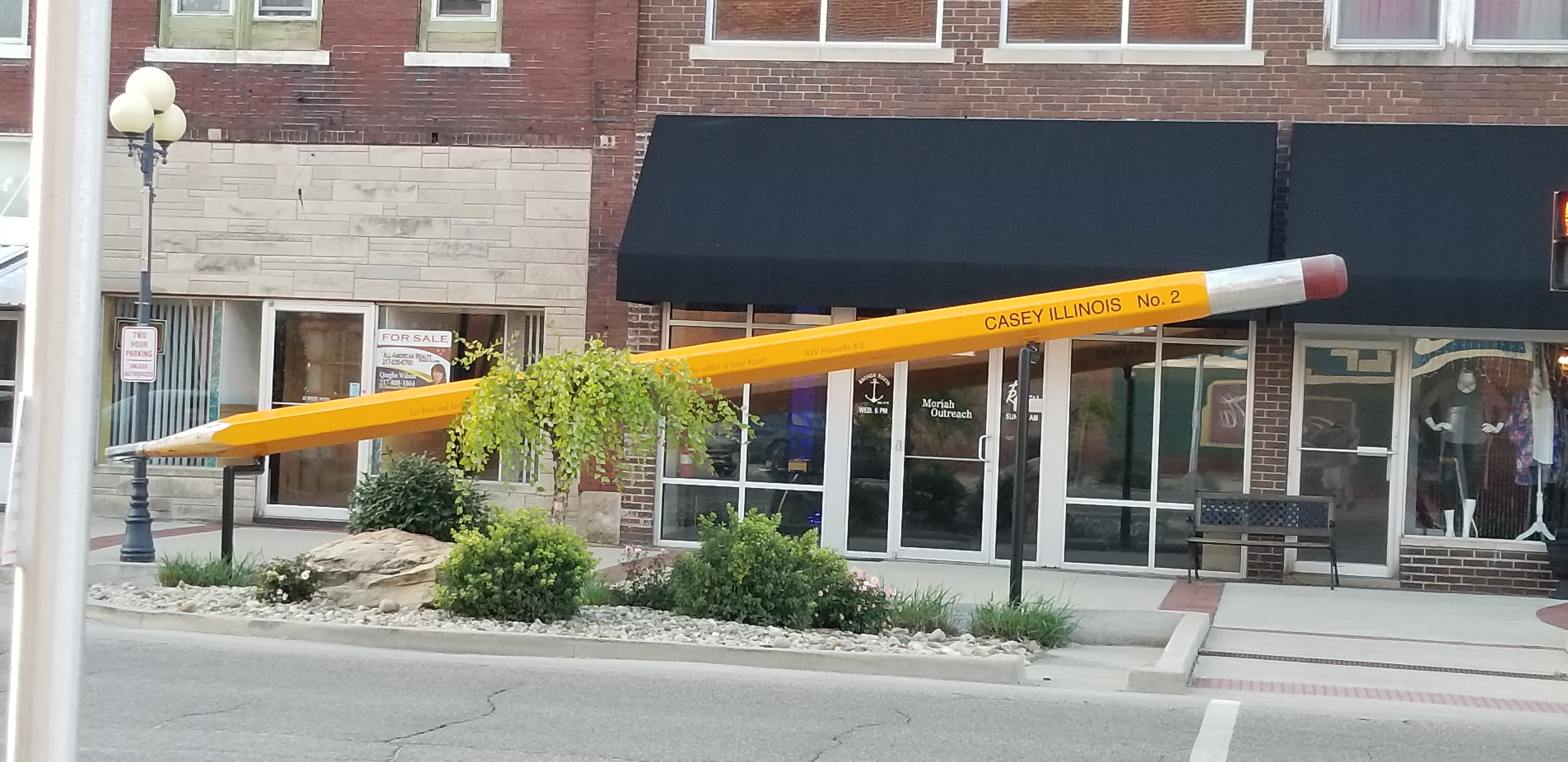
Large pencil

While Bolin initially constructed these items to bring in more tourism and revitalize Casey during a time of economic distress, he also built them as monuments to his religion. He wrote of the wind chimes, "There’s a cross at the top. I’m a man of faith, and I wanted the wind chime to point people to God. The welder who worked on it used religious symbols—the ichthus and the Star of David—for the braces that stabilize it." Each item hosts a plaque with a verse from Christian scripture.

== Notable residents ==
- David Hanners, 1989 Pulitzer Prize winner
