= Greenup, Illinois =

- Village
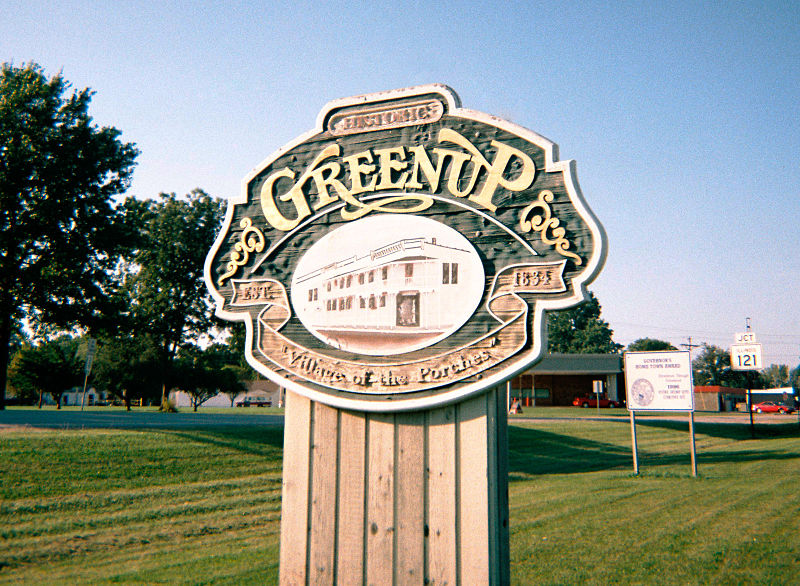
- "Village of the Porches"

- Location of Greenup in Cumberland County, Illinois.
- Coordinates: 39°15′06″N 88°09′29″W
- Country: United States
- State: Illinois
- County: Cumberland
- Township: Greenup

Area
  - Total: 1.75 sq mi (4.53 km^{2})
  - Land: 1.75 sq mi (4.53 km^{2})
  - Water: 0 sq mi (0.00 km^{2})
- Elevation: 594 ft (181 m)

Population (2020)
  - Total: 1,365
  - Density: 780/sq mi (301.2/km^{2})
- Time zone: UTC-6 (CST)
  - Summer (DST): UTC-5 (CDT)
- ZIP Code: 62428
- Area code: 217, 447
- FIPS code: 17-31524
- GNIS ID: 2398204
- Website: villageofgreenup.com

Greenup is a village in Cumberland County, Illinois, United States, along the Embarras River. The population was 1,365 at the 2020 census. It is part of the Charleston–Mattoon Micropolitan Statistical Area.

== History ==
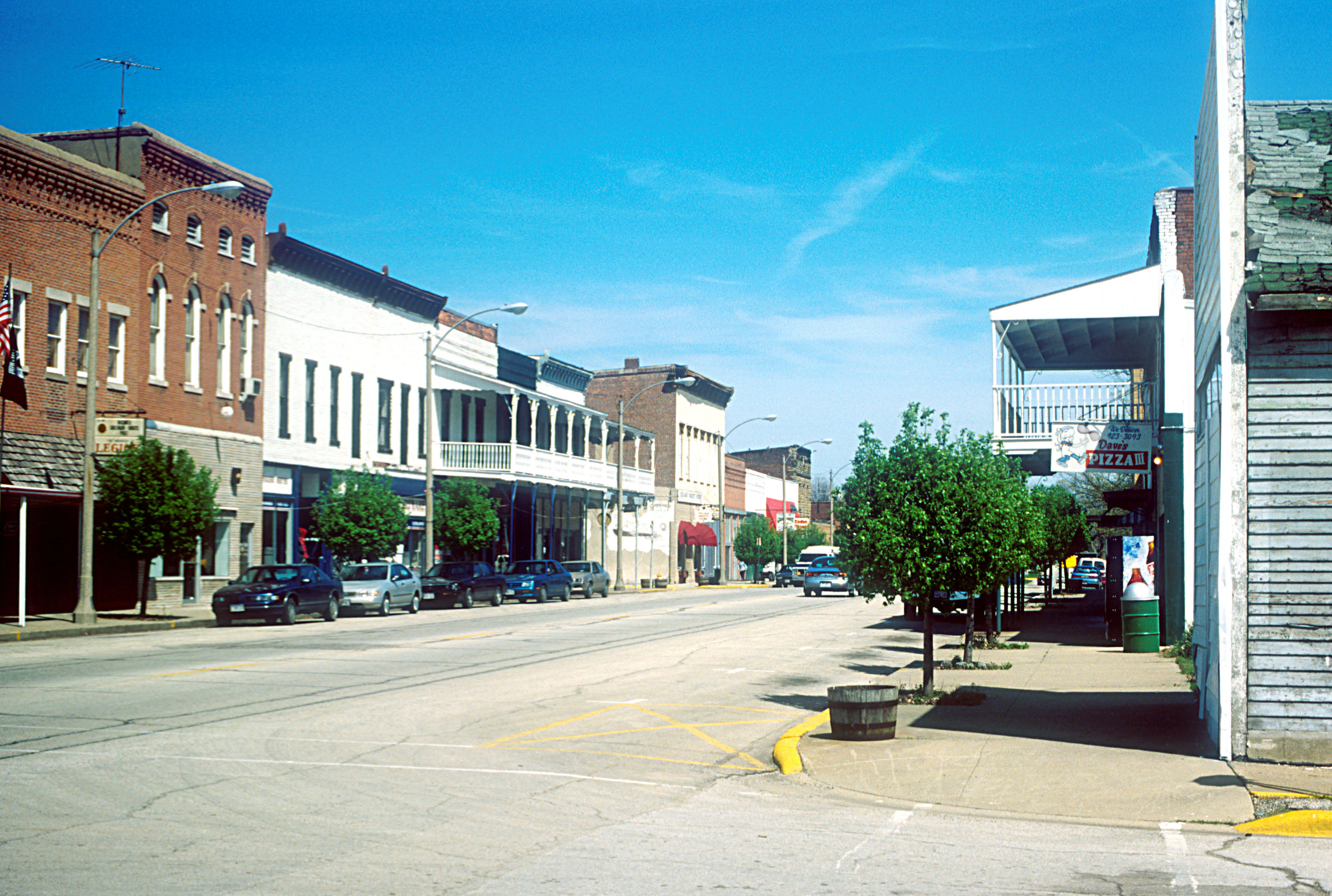
Business district of Greenup

Greenup received its name from National Road surveyor, William C. Greenup who platted the town in 1834. He was one of the supervisors hired to oversee construction of the National Road in Illinois, surveying the original alignment from Marshall to Vandalia during the 1830s.

Greenup was platted in 1834, and served as Cumberland County's first county seat from 1843 to 1855.

== Geography ==
Greenup is located southeast of the center of Cumberland County. The Embarras River, a tributary of the Wabash River, flows past the northwest corner of the village. U.S. Route 40 runs through the village to the south of its center, while Interstate 70 runs through the northern corner of the village with access from Exit 119 (Illinois Route 130). Effingham is 22 miles (35 km) to the west, while Terre Haute, Indiana, is 44 miles (71 km) to the east.

According to the 2021 census gazetteer files, Greenup has a total area of 1.75 square miles (4.53 km^{2}), of which 1.75 square miles (4.53 km^{2}) (or 99.94%) is land and 0.00 square miles (0.00 km^{2}) (or 0.06%) is water.

== Demographics ==
Historical population
Census	Pop.	Note	%±
1870	535		—
1880	605		13.1%
1890	858		41.8%
1900	1,085		26.5%
1910	1,224		12.8%
1920	1,230		0.5%
1930	1,062		−13.7%
1940	1,410		32.8%
1950	1,360		−3.5%
1960	1,477		8.6%
1970	1,618		9.5%
1980	1,655		2.3%
1990	1,616		−2.4%
2000	1,532		−5.2%
2010	1,513		−1.2%
2020	1,365		−9.8%
U.S. Decennial Census

=== 2020 census ===
As of the 2020 census, Greenup had a population of 1,365. The population density was 779.55 inhabitants per square mile (300.99/km^{2}). The median age was 43.4 years. 20.1% of residents were under the age of 18 and 23.1% of residents were 65 years of age or older. For every 100 females there were 89.6 males, and for every 100 females age 18 and over there were 87.8 males age 18 and over.

0.0% of residents lived in urban areas, while 100.0% lived in rural areas.

There were 637 households in Greenup, of which 23.9% had children under the age of 18 living in them. Of all households, 36.4% were married-couple households, 23.2% were households with a male householder and no spouse or partner present, and 32.0% were households with a female householder and no spouse or partner present. About 40.0% of all households were made up of individuals and 19.8% had someone living alone who was 65 years of age or older.

There were 701 housing units at an average density of 400.34 per square mile (154.57/km^{2}), of which 9.1% were vacant. The homeowner vacancy rate was 0.6% and the rental vacancy rate was 7.7%.

Racial composition as of the 2020 census
Race	Number	Percent
White	1,273	93.3%
Black or African American	10	0.7%
American Indian and Alaska Native	6	0.4%
Asian	3	0.2%
Native Hawaiian and Other Pacific Islander	1	0.1%
Some other race	5	0.4%
Two or more races	67	4.9%
Hispanic or Latino (of any race)	21	1.5%

=== Income and poverty ===
The median income for a household in the village was $40,139, and the median income for a family was $72,598. Males had a median income of $47,143 versus $25,355 for females. The per capita income for the village was $22,561. About 7.1% of families and 14.8% of the population were below the poverty line, including 16.9% of those under age 18 and 9.9% of those age 65 or over.

== Education ==
Students in Greenup attend Cumberland Community Unit School District 77. The elementary, middle, and high school are located in Toledo.

== Notable people ==
- Lincoln Bancroft, Illinois state representative and mayor of Greenup.
- Abe ("Ab") Bowman, pitcher for the Cleveland Indians, born in Greenup.
- James A. Peters, University of Michigan, herpetologist, Curator at Smithsonian Institution.
- Bobbi Trout, pioneer aviator, born in Greenup.
- Cy Warman, 19th century author; born and raised near Greenup.
