= Cumberland Community Unit School District 77 =

School district in Cumberland County, Illinois, United States

Address
- 1496 Illinois Route 121 Toledo, Illinois, 62468; United States

District information
- Type: Public
- Grades: PreK–12
- NCES District ID: 1739090

Students and staff
- Students: 1,006 (2021–2022)
- Athletic conference: Lincoln Prairie Conference
- District mascot: Raiders (6-8); Pirates (9-12)
- Colors: Columbia Blue; Gold

Other information
- Website: www.cumberland.k12.il.us

The Cumberland Community Unit School District 77 is a unified school district in Cumberland County, Illinois. It is located in the countryside between the villages of Toledo and Greenup. The school district draws students from the towns of Toledo, Greenup, and Jewett. It is composed of three schools: one elementary school, one middle school, and one high school, and altogether, as of the 2021–22 school year, accommodates 1,006 students. Students just entering the district first attend the Cumberland Elementary School, which serves them from kindergarten to grade four. The school also runs a pre-kindergarten program. Those in grades five to eight attend the Cumberland Middle School. The graduates spend their last years in the district at the Cumberland High School, from grade nine to grade twelve. The principal of the Cumberland High School is Kevin Meynard. The superintendent of the district is Todd Butler; the nickname of the district middle school is the Raiders, while the nickname of the high school is the Pirates.

The district high school runs a series of clubs that range from a branch of the FFA and one that pressed towards environmental awareness to a National Honor Society, a varsity Scholastic Bowl team, and a woodworking club known as "Splinter Group." The middle school's activities are more limited; Cumberland Middle School encompasses a school band, a chorus program, a student council, a junior varsity Scholastic Bowl team, and an ecology study group.

The Illinois Report card for 2022 designated the district a "Commendable School" with "no underperforming student groups, a graduation rate greater than 67%, and whose performance is not in the top 10% of schools statewide."

== Athletics ==
Cumberland's Middle School athletics participate in the Little Eastern Illini Conference and are members of the Illinois Elementary School Association. Cumberland's High School athletics participate in the Lincoln Prairie Conference and are members of the Illinois High School Association.

=== Boys ===
- Baseball
- Basketball
- Cross Country
- Football
- Track & Field
- Wrestling

=== Girls ===
- Basketball
- Cross Country
- Softball
- Track & Field
- Volleyball
- Wrestling
