= 1932 United States presidential election in Illinois =

- November 8, 1932

All 29 Illinois votes to the Electoral College

Nominee	Franklin D. Roosevelt	Herbert Hoover
Party	Democratic	Republican
Home state	New York	California
Running mate	John Nance Garner	Charles Curtis
Electoral vote	29	0
Popular vote	1,882,304	1,432,756
Percentage	55.23%	42.04%
County results
Roosevelt
40–50%
50–60%
60–70%
70–80%
Hoover
40–50%
50–60%
60–70%
President before election
Herbert Hoover
Republican
Elected President
Franklin D. Roosevelt
Democratic

The 1932 United States presidential election in Illinois took place on November 8, 1932, as part of the 1932 United States presidential election. State voters chose 29 representatives, or electors, to the Electoral College, who voted for president and vice president.

Illinois was won by Governor Franklin D. Roosevelt (D–New York), running with Speaker John Nance Garner, with 55.23% of the popular vote, against incumbent President Herbert Hoover (R–California), running with Vice President Charles Curtis, with 42.04% of the popular vote.

This is the only occasion since at least the American Civil War that any Democratic presidential candidate has ever carried Ford County or Stark County. As of the 2024 presidential election, this is also the last occasion when Livingston County and Washington County have voted for a Democratic presidential candidate.

== Primaries ==
The primaries and general elections coincided with those for other federal offices (Senate and House), as well as those for state offices.

=== Turnout ===
The total vote in the state-run primary elections (Democratic and Republican) was 939,189.

The total vote in the general election was 3,407,926. Both major parties held non-binding state-run preferential primaries on April 12.

=== Democratic ===
1932 Illinois Democratic presidential primary
- April 12, 1932
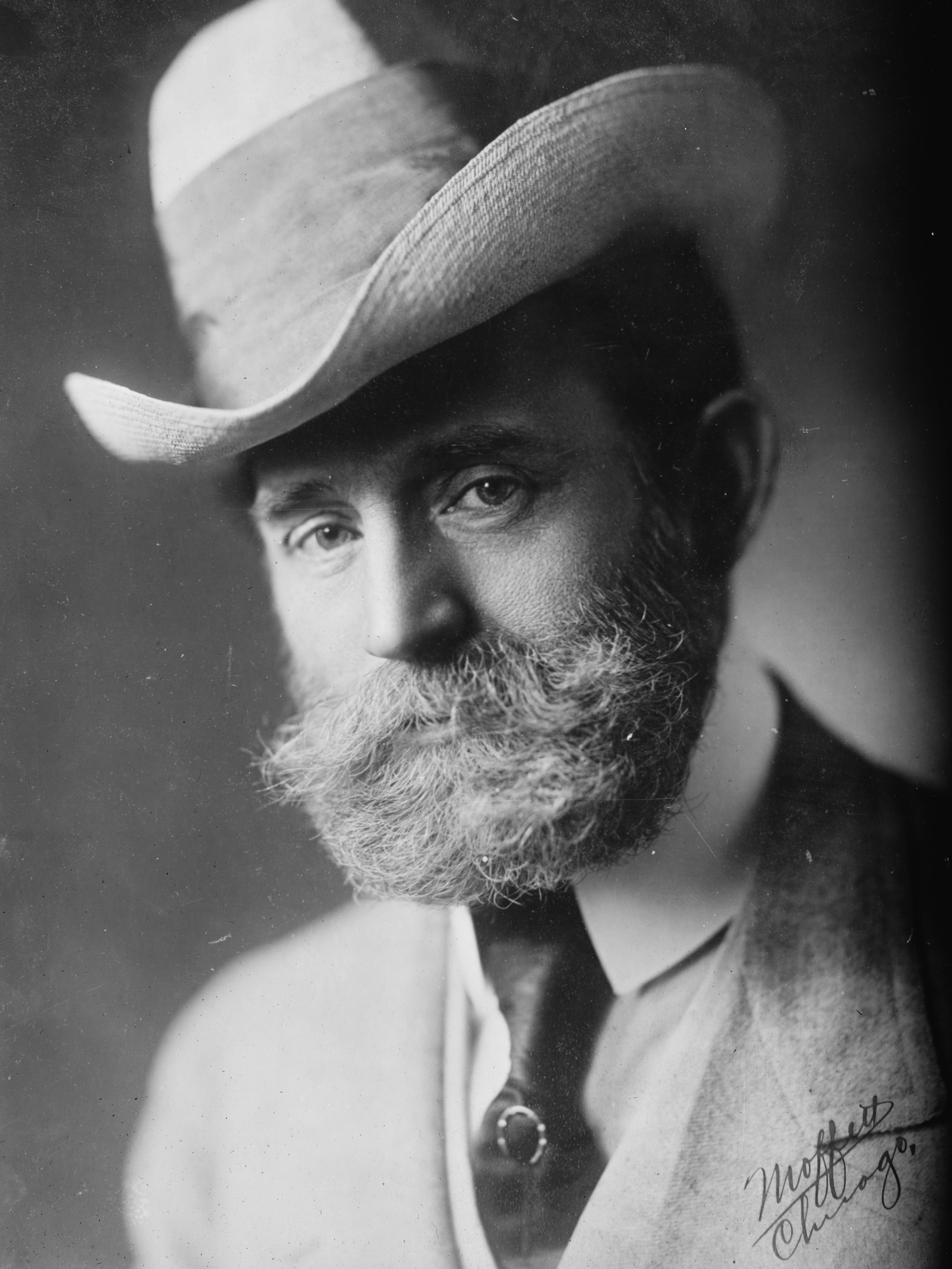
Candidate	J. Hamilton Lewis
Home state	Illinois
Popular vote	590,130
Percentage	99.75%

The 1932 Illinois Democratic presidential primary was held on April 12, 1932, in the U.S. state of Illinois as one of the Democratic Party's state primaries ahead of the 1932 presidential election.

The popular vote was a non-binding "beauty contest". Delegates were instead elected by direct votes by congressional district on delegate candidates.

The popular vote was near-unanimously won by the only name on the ballot, U.S. Senator from Illinois J. Hamilton Lewis, who ran as a favorite son.

1932 Illinois Democratic presidential primary
Candidate	Votes	%
James Hamilton Lewis	590,130	99.75
Franklin D. Roosevelt (write-in)	1,084	0.18
Alfred E. Smith (write-in)	266	0.05
John Garner (write-in)	35	0.01
Albert Ritchie (write-in)	15	0.00
Scattering	22	0.00
Total	591,587	100

=== Republican ===
1932 Illinois Republican presidential primary
- April 12, 1932
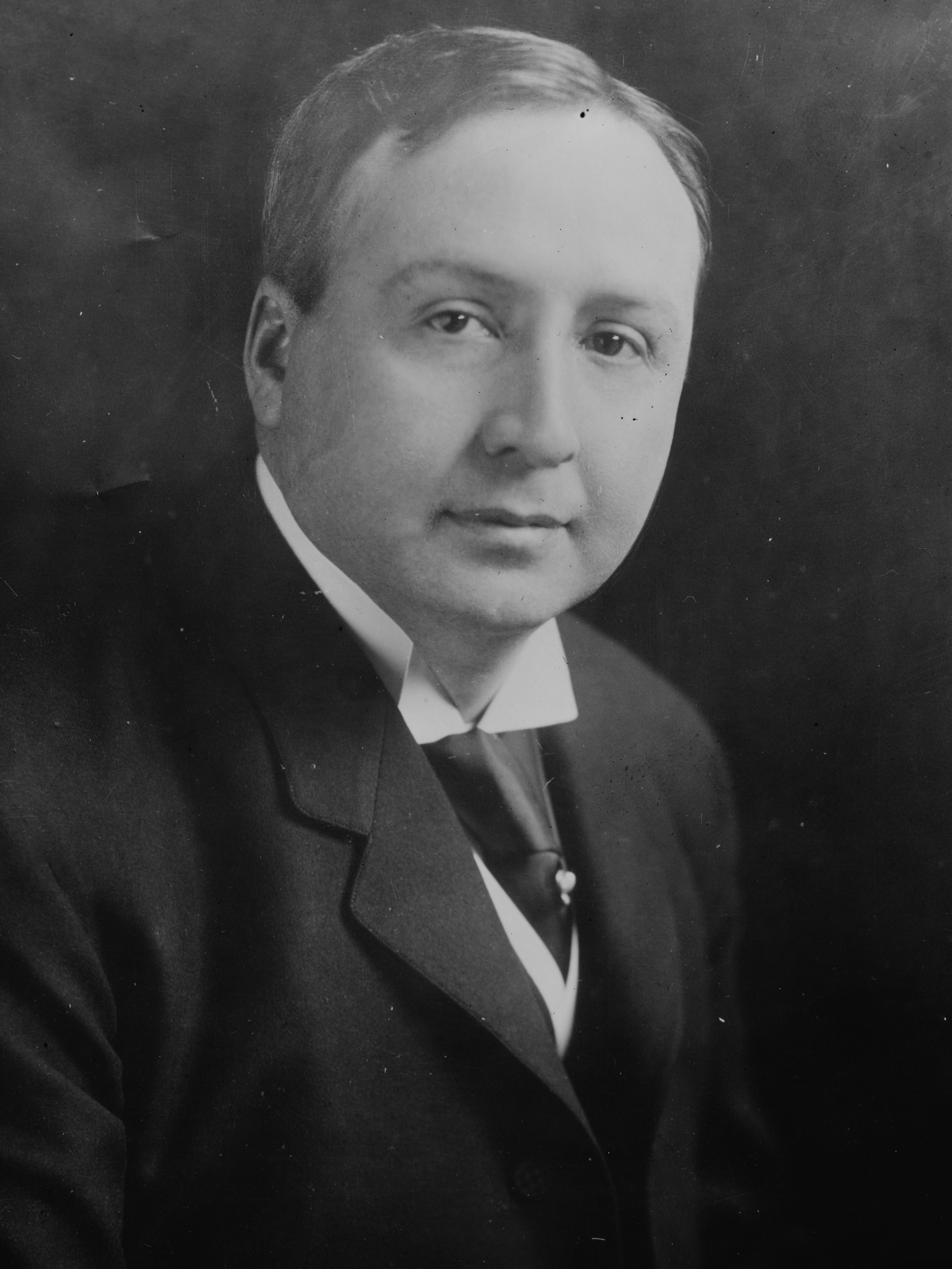
Candidate	Joseph I. France
Home state	Maryland
Popular vote	345,498
Percentage	99.50%

The 1932 Illinois Republican presidential primary was held on April 12, 1932, in the U.S. state of Illinois as one of the Republican Party's state primaries ahead of the 1932 presidential election.

The preference vote was a "beauty contest". Delegates were instead selected by direct-vote in each congressional districts on delegate candidates.

The popular vote was near-unanimously won by the only name on the ballot, former U.S. Senator from Maryland Joseph I. France.

1932 Illinois Republican presidential primary
Candidate	Votes	%
Joseph Irwin France	345,498	99.50
Herbert Hoover (incumbent) (write-in)	1,750	0.50
Charles G. Dawes (write-in)	129	0.04
Calvin Coolidge (write-in)	95	0.03
Frank O. Lowden (write-in)	79	0.02
Scattering	51	0.02
Total	347,602	100

== Results ==
1932 United States presidential election in Illinois
Party	Candidate	Votes	%
Democratic	Franklin D. Roosevelt	1,882,304	55.23%
Republican	Herbert Hoover (inc.)	1,432,756	42.04%
Socialist	Norman Thomas	67,258	1.97%
Communist	William Z. Foster	15,582	0.46%
Prohibition	William Upshaw	6,388	0.19%
Socialist Labor	Verne L. Reynolds	3,638	0.11%
Total votes		3,407,926	100.00%

=== Results by county ===
County	Franklin Delano Roosevelt Democratic		Herbert Clark Hoover Republican		Normal Mattoon Thomas Socialist		Various candidates Other parties		Margin		Total votes cast
County	#	%	#	%	#	%	#	%	#	%	Total votes cast
Adams	21,098	66.62%	10,134	32.00%	379	1.20%	58	0.18%	10,964	34.62%	31,669
Alexander	5,653	53.67%	4,729	44.90%	129	1.22%	22	0.21%	924	8.77%	10,533
Bond	3,630	52.17%	3,171	45.57%	119	1.71%	38	0.55%	459	6.60%	6,958
Boone	2,239	29.56%	5,244	69.23%	75	0.99%	17	0.22%	-3,005	-39.67%	7,575
Brown	2,822	70.67%	1,148	28.75%	11	0.28%	12	0.30%	1,674	41.92%	3,993
Bureau	10,309	53.47%	8,721	45.23%	187	0.97%	63	0.33%	1,588	8.24%	19,280
Calhoun	2,229	63.61%	1,239	35.36%	29	0.83%	7	0.20%	990	28.25%	3,504
Carroll	3,812	44.87%	4,571	53.81%	84	0.99%	28	0.33%	-759	-8.93%	8,495
Cass	5,669	66.64%	2,745	32.27%	58	0.68%	35	0.41%	2,924	34.37%	8,507
Champaign	16,474	53.02%	13,995	45.04%	499	1.61%	102	0.33%	2,479	7.98%	31,070
Christian	11,515	63.12%	6,096	33.42%	542	2.97%	89	0.49%	5,419	29.71%	18,242
Clark	5,659	57.27%	4,148	41.98%	21	0.21%	53	0.54%	1,511	15.29%	9,881
Clay	4,565	56.61%	3,373	41.83%	63	0.78%	63	0.78%	1,192	14.78%	8,064
Clinton	7,736	73.92%	2,548	24.35%	169	1.61%	13	0.12%	5,188	49.57%	10,466
Coles	11,081	59.71%	7,313	39.40%	116	0.63%	49	0.26%	3,768	20.30%	18,559
Cook	919,231	55.23%	690,146	41.47%	36,998	2.22%	17,857	1.07%	229,085	13.77%	1,664,232
Crawford	6,081	56.31%	4,550	42.13%	89	0.82%	80	0.74%	1,531	14.18%	10,800
Cumberland	3,128	58.75%	2,166	40.68%	16	0.30%	14	0.26%	962	18.07%	5,324
DeKalb	6,923	41.72%	9,356	56.38%	273	1.65%	42	0.25%	-2,433	-14.66%	16,594
DeWitt	5,339	55.19%	4,207	43.49%	97	1.00%	30	0.31%	1,132	11.70%	9,673
Douglas	4,954	60.15%	3,108	37.74%	134	1.63%	40	0.49%	1,846	22.41%	8,236
DuPage	18,547	40.49%	25,758	56.23%	1,364	2.98%	140	0.31%	-7,211	-15.74%	45,809
Edgar	7,745	55.98%	5,953	43.03%	107	0.77%	31	0.22%	1,792	12.95%	13,836
Edwards	1,956	46.39%	2,203	52.25%	36	0.85%	21	0.50%	-247	-5.86%	4,216
Effingham	6,503	67.96%	2,933	30.65%	105	1.10%	28	0.29%	3,570	37.31%	9,569
Fayette	7,053	57.06%	5,122	41.44%	89	0.72%	96	0.78%	1,931	15.62%	12,360
Ford	4,175	54.82%	3,342	43.88%	90	1.18%	9	0.12%	833	10.94%	7,616
Franklin	14,754	63.35%	7,560	32.46%	655	2.81%	321	1.38%	7,194	30.89%	23,290
Fulton	12,144	58.92%	7,579	36.77%	569	2.76%	319	1.55%	4,565	22.15%	20,611
Gallatin	3,469	72.08%	1,279	26.57%	39	0.81%	26	0.54%	2,190	45.50%	4,813
Greene	6,347	67.99%	2,857	30.61%	94	1.01%	37	0.40%	3,490	37.39%	9,335
Grundy	4,755	51.05%	4,491	48.21%	64	0.69%	5	0.05%	264	2.83%	9,315
Hamilton	4,059	61.34%	2,513	37.98%	17	0.26%	28	0.42%	1,546	23.36%	6,617
Hancock	8,808	64.13%	4,789	34.87%	50	0.36%	87	0.63%	4,019	29.26%	13,734
Hardin	1,610	49.95%	1,559	48.37%	43	1.33%	11	0.34%	51	1.58%	3,223
Henderson	2,372	55.60%	1,815	42.55%	66	1.55%	13	0.30%	557	13.06%	4,266
Henry	10,122	45.60%	11,376	51.25%	637	2.87%	64	0.29%	-1,254	-5.65%	22,199
Iroquois	9,434	59.34%	6,303	39.65%	138	0.87%	23	0.14%	3,131	19.69%	15,898
Jackson	9,730	54.93%	7,636	43.10%	269	1.52%	80	0.45%	2,094	11.82%	17,715
Jasper	4,390	65.27%	2,300	34.20%	16	0.24%	20	0.30%	2,090	31.07%	6,726
Jefferson	9,495	63.28%	5,333	35.54%	101	0.67%	76	0.51%	4,162	27.74%	15,005
Jersey	3,807	62.73%	2,157	35.54%	88	1.45%	17	0.28%	1,650	27.19%	6,069
Jo Daviess	5,497	54.01%	4,520	44.41%	133	1.31%	27	0.27%	977	9.60%	10,177
Johnson	2,387	49.11%	2,424	49.87%	37	0.76%	13	0.27%	-37	-0.76%	4,861
Kane	24,638	42.00%	32,934	56.15%	962	1.64%	122	0.21%	-8,296	-14.14%	58,656
Kankakee	13,555	54.67%	10,873	43.86%	321	1.29%	43	0.17%	2,682	10.82%	24,792
Kendall	2,398	46.04%	2,749	52.77%	56	1.08%	6	0.12%	-351	-6.74%	5,209
Knox	12,282	49.29%	12,244	49.14%	327	1.31%	65	0.26%	38	0.15%	24,918
Lake	21,139	44.86%	23,994	50.92%	1,719	3.65%	270	0.57%	-2,855	-6.06%	47,122
LaSalle	27,500	57.79%	19,179	40.30%	804	1.69%	104	0.22%	8,321	17.49%	47,587
Lawrence	6,100	58.42%	4,194	40.17%	48	0.46%	99	0.95%	1,906	18.25%	10,441
Lee	7,182	47.37%	7,802	51.46%	153	1.01%	24	0.16%	-620	-4.09%	15,161
Livingston	10,024	53.92%	8,403	45.20%	113	0.61%	49	0.26%	1,621	8.72%	18,589
Logan	8,119	57.52%	5,850	41.44%	108	0.77%	39	0.28%	2,269	16.07%	14,116
Macon	21,638	54.99%	16,868	42.87%	635	1.61%	205	0.52%	4,770	12.12%	39,346
Macoupin	14,810	62.65%	7,031	29.74%	1,567	6.63%	232	0.98%	7,779	32.91%	23,640
Madison	35,211	61.52%	19,774	34.55%	1,980	3.46%	273	0.48%	15,437	26.97%	57,238
Marion	10,791	62.09%	6,276	36.11%	217	1.25%	96	0.55%	4,515	25.98%	17,380
Marshall	4,133	56.27%	3,166	43.10%	29	0.39%	17	0.23%	967	13.17%	7,345
Mason	5,681	68.45%	2,551	30.73%	50	0.60%	18	0.22%	3,130	37.71%	8,300
Massac	2,593	46.93%	2,851	51.60%	64	1.16%	17	0.31%	-258	-4.67%	5,525
McDonough	7,608	53.94%	6,329	44.87%	115	0.82%	53	0.38%	1,279	9.07%	14,105
McHenry	8,260	44.42%	9,880	53.14%	431	2.32%	23	0.12%	-1,620	-8.71%	18,594
McLean	19,535	54.46%	15,450	43.07%	697	1.94%	189	0.53%	4,085	11.39%	35,871
Menard	3,453	59.30%	2,327	39.96%	30	0.52%	13	0.22%	1,126	19.34%	5,823
Mercer	4,309	48.77%	4,436	50.21%	45	0.51%	45	0.51%	-127	-1.44%	8,835
Monroe	3,993	63.80%	2,186	34.93%	74	1.18%	6	0.10%	1,807	28.87%	6,259
Montgomery	10,456	61.05%	5,945	34.71%	628	3.67%	97	0.57%	4,511	26.34%	17,126
Morgan	10,170	56.09%	7,787	42.95%	125	0.69%	48	0.26%	2,383	13.14%	18,130
Moultrie	4,219	63.48%	2,353	35.40%	48	0.72%	26	0.39%	1,866	28.08%	6,646
Ogle	5,416	38.93%	8,224	59.11%	205	1.47%	67	0.48%	-2,808	-20.18%	13,912
Peoria	37,605	59.02%	25,166	39.50%	776	1.22%	169	0.27%	12,439	19.52%	63,716
Perry	7,400	64.34%	3,778	32.85%	251	2.18%	73	0.63%	3,622	31.49%	11,502
Piatt	4,200	56.43%	3,179	42.71%	45	0.60%	19	0.26%	1,021	13.72%	7,443
Pike	8,013	64.35%	4,181	33.58%	205	1.65%	53	0.43%	3,832	30.77%	12,452
Pope	1,697	45.47%	2,011	53.89%	12	0.32%	12	0.32%	-314	-8.41%	3,732
Pulaski	3,446	51.23%	3,225	47.95%	45	0.67%	10	0.15%	221	3.29%	6,726
Putnam	1,554	58.62%	1,050	39.61%	41	1.55%	6	0.23%	504	19.01%	2,651
Randolph	8,634	63.27%	4,747	34.78%	240	1.76%	26	0.19%	3,887	28.48%	13,647
Richland	4,318	60.12%	2,765	38.50%	55	0.77%	44	0.61%	1,553	21.62%	7,182
Rock Island	24,676	53.01%	21,205	45.55%	456	0.98%	212	0.46%	3,471	7.46%	46,549
Saline	9,725	59.04%	6,294	38.21%	348	2.11%	106	0.64%	3,431	20.83%	16,473
Sangamon	32,745	54.00%	26,856	44.29%	742	1.22%	300	0.49%	5,889	9.71%	60,643
Schuyler	3,782	63.78%	2,075	34.99%	33	0.56%	40	0.67%	1,707	28.79%	5,930
Scott	3,012	62.70%	1,740	36.22%	44	0.92%	8	0.17%	1,272	26.48%	4,804
Shelby	8,093	62.40%	4,657	35.91%	126	0.97%	93	0.72%	3,436	26.49%	12,969
St. Clair	47,305	65.18%	22,744	31.34%	2,073	2.86%	449	0.62%	24,561	33.84%	72,571
Stark	2,369	52.26%	2,119	46.75%	34	0.75%	11	0.24%	250	5.52%	4,533
Stephenson	10,728	53.11%	8,963	44.38%	349	1.73%	158	0.78%	1,765	8.74%	20,198
Tazewell	13,591	64.55%	7,260	34.48%	160	0.76%	44	0.21%	6,331	30.07%	21,055
Union	6,157	67.77%	2,859	31.47%	50	0.55%	19	0.21%	3,298	36.30%	9,085
Vermilion	24,032	59.08%	15,643	38.46%	678	1.67%	324	0.80%	8,389	20.62%	40,677
Wabash	4,280	63.93%	2,309	34.49%	66	0.99%	40	0.60%	1,971	29.44%	6,695
Warren	5,610	49.83%	5,498	48.84%	88	0.78%	62	0.55%	112	0.99%	11,258
Washington	4,696	59.25%	3,076	38.81%	117	1.48%	37	0.47%	1,620	20.44%	7,926
Wayne	5,488	56.84%	4,097	42.43%	35	0.36%	36	0.37%	1,391	14.41%	9,656
White	5,909	63.55%	3,320	35.71%	41	0.44%	28	0.30%	2,589	27.84%	9,298
Whiteside	7,010	37.64%	11,388	61.14%	199	1.07%	29	0.16%	-4,378	-23.50%	18,626
Will	25,798	49.36%	25,173	48.16%	1,190	2.28%	105	0.20%	625	1.20%	52,266
Williamson	12,961	58.21%	8,714	39.14%	448	2.01%	142	0.64%	4,247	19.07%	22,265
Winnebago	17,707	37.98%	26,632	57.12%	1,794	3.85%	492	1.06%	-8,925	-19.14%	46,625
Woodford	5,244	57.05%	3,866	42.06%	71	0.77%	11	0.12%	1,378	14.99%	9,192
Totals	1,882,304	55.23%	1,432,756	42.04%	67,258	1.97%	25,608	0.75%	449,548	13.19%	3,407,926

==== Counties that flipped from Republican to Democratic ====
- Bond
- Bureau
- Ford
- Grundy
- Hardin
- Henderson
- Jackson
- Jo Daviess
- Knox
- Livingston
- McDonough
- Stark
- Warren
- Washington
- Woodford
- Winnebago
- Adams
- Calhoun
- Champaign
- Clark
- Clay
- Crawford
- Cumberland
- DeWitt
- Douglas
- Fayette
- Franklin
- Edwards
- Iroquois
- Hamilton
- Hancock
- Jasper
- Jersey
- Kankakee
- Lawrence
- Marshall
- Mason
- McLean
- Menard
- Morgan
- Montgomery
- Piatt
- Pulaski
- Putnam
- Richland
- Stephenson
- Sangamon
- Scott
- Vermilion
- Will
- Wayne
- Coles
- Alexander
- LaSalle
- Moultrie
- Peoria
- Saline
- Schuyler
- Shelby
- Williamson
- Tazewell
- White
- Brown
- Cass
- Christian
- Cook
- Greene
- Jefferson
- Macon
- Madison
- Marion
- Pike
- Rock Island

== See also ==
- United States presidential elections in Illinois
