= 1932 New Jersey Republican presidential primary =

1932 New Jersey Republican presidential primaries
- May 15, 1932
- Presidential delegate primary

33 Republican National Convention delegates

Candidate	Uncommitted	Herbert Hoover	Anti-Prohibition
Home state		California
Delegate count	12	10	4
Popular vote	274,506	217,704	61,325
Percentage	49.6%	39.3%	11.1%
- Presidential preference primary (non-binding)

No Republican National Convention delegates
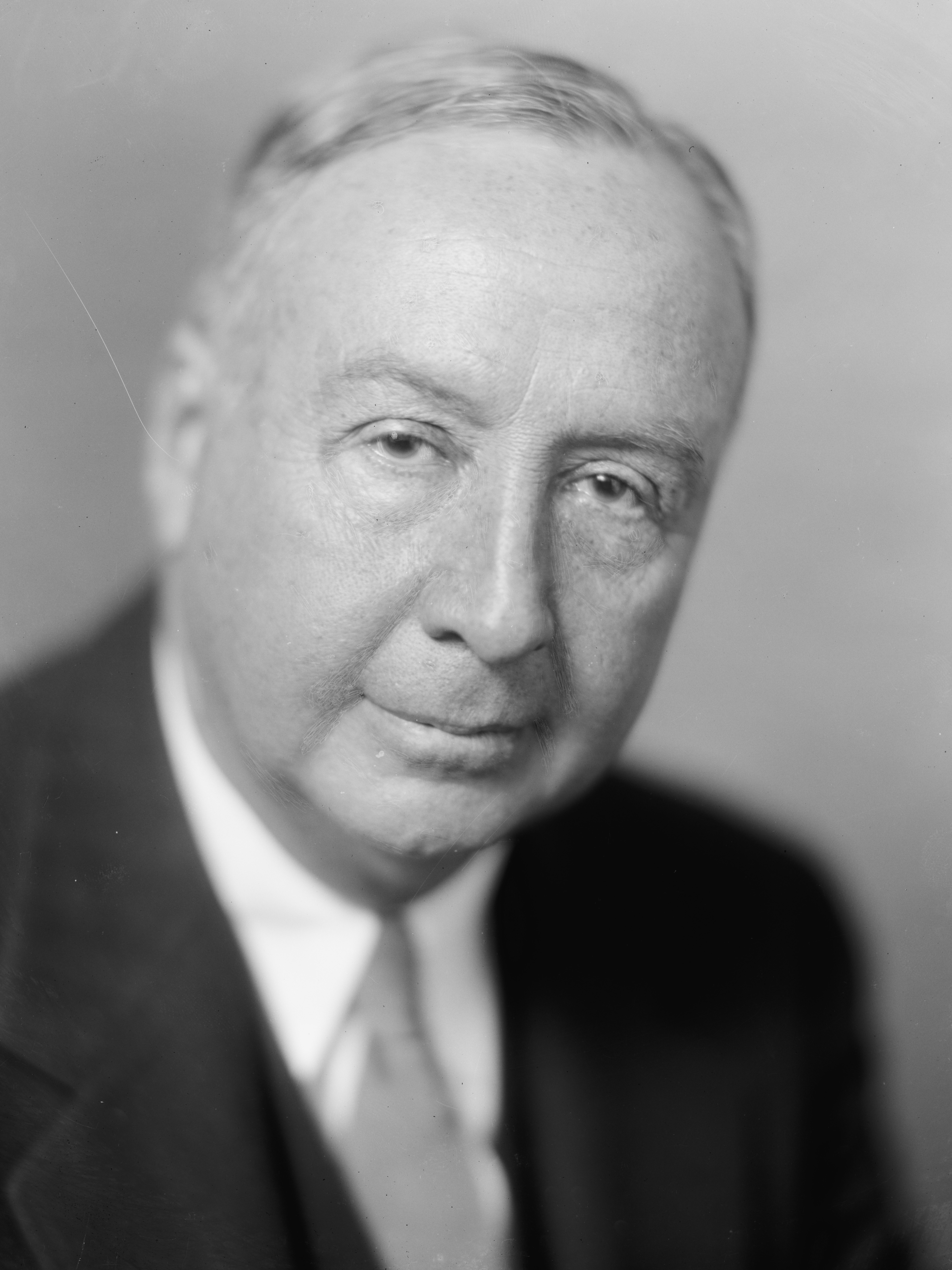

Candidate	Joseph I. France	Herbert Hoover (write-in)
Home state	Maryland	California
Popular vote	141,330	10,116
Percentage	93.3%	6.7%

The 1932 New Jersey Republican presidential primary was held on May 17, 1932, in New Jersey as one of the Republican Party's statewide nomination contests ahead of the 1932 United States presidential election. Delegates to the 1932 Republican National Convention were elected from each of the state's congressional districts, along with seven delegates at-large.

The plurality of the elected delegates were not publicly committed to supporting any candidate, but most were establishment politicians who supported incumbent Herbert Hoover. Where delegates pledged explicitly to Hoover ran, they won every race. Four delegates were elected on tickets opposed to the prohibition of alcohol under the Volstead Act. In the non-binding presidential preference primary held concurrently, U.S. senator Joseph I. France was the only candidate listed on the ballot, but several thousand write-in votes were cast for Hoover.

Ultimately, all of the New Jersey delegates voted for Hoover at the national convention, as he was easily renominated. He lost the general election in a landslide to New York governor Franklin D. Roosevelt.

== Background ==
=== Procedure ===
In 1932, New Jersey was allocated 31 total delegates to the Republican National Convention. Seven delegates were elected at-large, and two delegates were elected from each of the state's twelve congressional districts, along with two alternates. Delegates were given the choice of pledging support to a particular candidate or running as uncommitted delegates.

The state also held a presidential preference primary. Joseph I. France was the only candidate listed on the ballot.

== Endorsements ==
Herbert Hoover (incumbent)
Uncommitted

== Results ==
=== Preference primary results ===
1932 New Jersey Republican presidential preference primary
Party	Candidate	Votes	%
Republican	Joseph I. France	141,330	93.32%
Republican	Herbert Hoover (inc.; write-in)	10,116	6.68%
Total votes		151,446	100.00%

Despite France's large margin in the "beauty contest" primary, he received significantly fewer votes than Hoover had in 1928, when Hoover was also the only candidate listed. Further, three of the largest counties in the state (Bergen, Essex, and Passaic) did not record any write-in votes, depressing Hoover's total significantly.

=== Delegate primary results ===
Delegate slate	Candidate	Delegate candidates		Delegates		Aggregate votes	
Delegate slate	Candidate	Statewide	District	Total	Of total (%)	Total	Of total (%)
Uncommitted	—N/a	7	8	13	39.93		
Herbert Hoover	Herbert Hoover	0	10	10	30.30		
Regular Republican	—N/a	0	8	6	18.18		
Anti-Prohibition (Note: Anti-prohibition delegates ran under several different slogans. In the fourth district, Enrest L. De Paur ran as an "Anti-Hoover-Anti-Prohibition" candidate. In the ninth district, two delegates were elected on a "Repeal of the 18th Amendment" ticket. In the eleventh district, two more delegates were elected under the "Immediate Volstead Modification Repeal Prohibition Amendment" ticket.)	—N/a	0	5	4	12.12		
Total		7	33	33	100.0	1,246,302	100.00
Registered voters, and turnout							

==== Delegate primary results by contest ====
1932 New Jersey Republican primary
Contest	Delegates and popular vote				
Contest	Uncommitted	Hoover	Anti-Prohibition	Other	Total
At-large	7; 1,671,954 (93.96%)	–	–	107,383 (6.04%)	1,779,337
1st district	–	2; 81,802 (100.00%)	–	–	81,802
2nd district	2; 51,751 (100.00%)	–	–	–	51,751
3rd district	2 (Note: As "Regular Republican" candidates.); 40,106 (100.00%)	–	–	–	40,106
4th district	–	2; 41,038 (82.56%)	8,667 (17.44%)	–	49,705
5th district	2 (Note: As "Regular Republican" candidates.); 45,185 (100.00%)	–	–	–	45,185
6th district	–	2; 50,210 (100.00%)	–	–	50,210
7th district	2 (Note: As "Regular Republican" candidates.); 38,675 (100.00%)	–	–	–	38,675
8th district	–	2; 34,243 (100.00%)	–	–	34,243
9th district	20,045 (Note: As "Regular Republican" candidates.) (47.21%)	–	2; 22,412 (52.79%)	–	42,457
10th district	2; 37,591 (100.00%)	–	–	–	37,591
11th district	–	–	2; 30,246 (100.00%)	–	30,246
12th district	2; 39,661 (100.00%)	–	–	–	39,661
13th district	1,492 (12.53%)	2; 10,411 (87.47%)	–	–	11,903
District totals	12 274,506 (49.59%)	10 217,704 (39.33%)	4 61,325 (11.08%)	–	553,535

== Aftermath ==
Ultimately, the New Jersey delegation unanimously supported Hoover at the 1932 Republican National Convention.
