= 1932 Democratic National Convention =

U.S. political event held in Chicago, Illinois

- 1932 presidential election
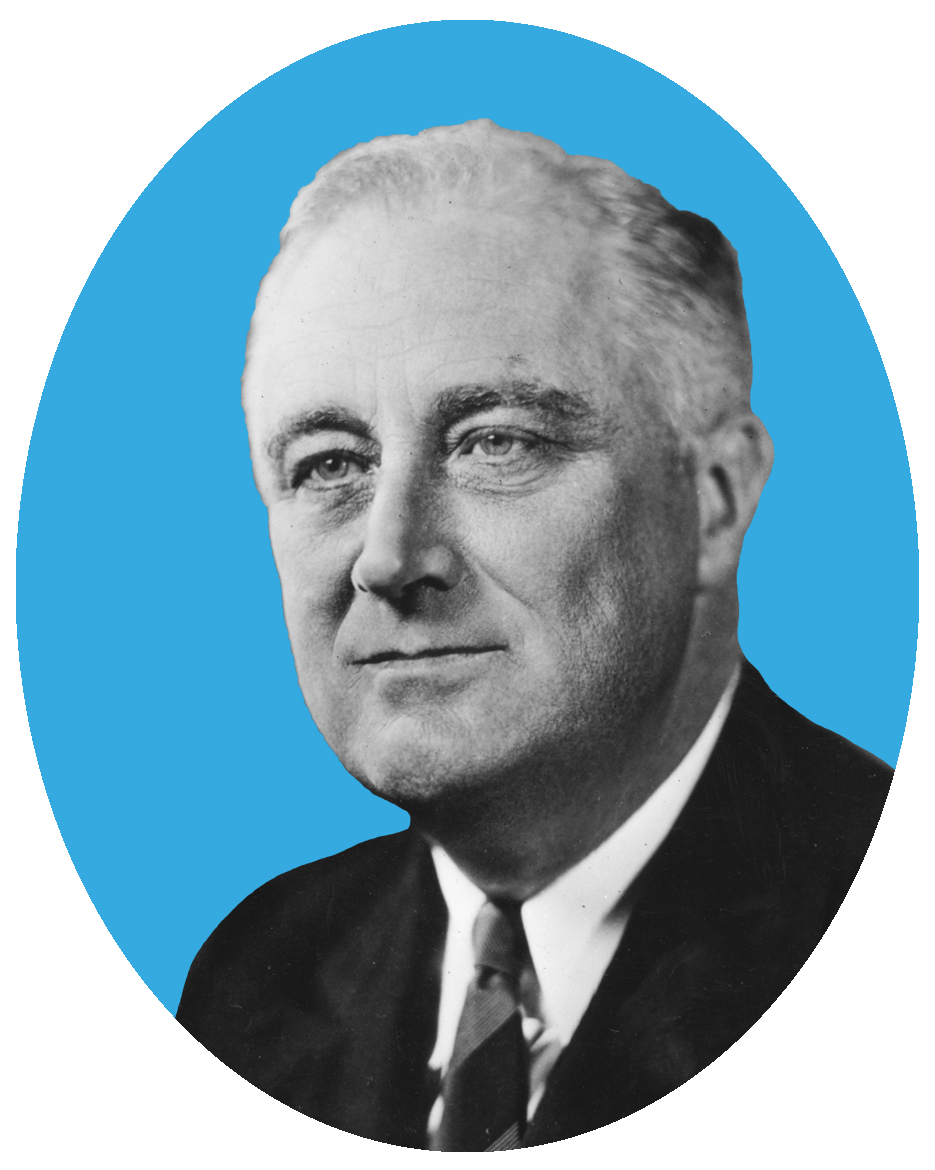
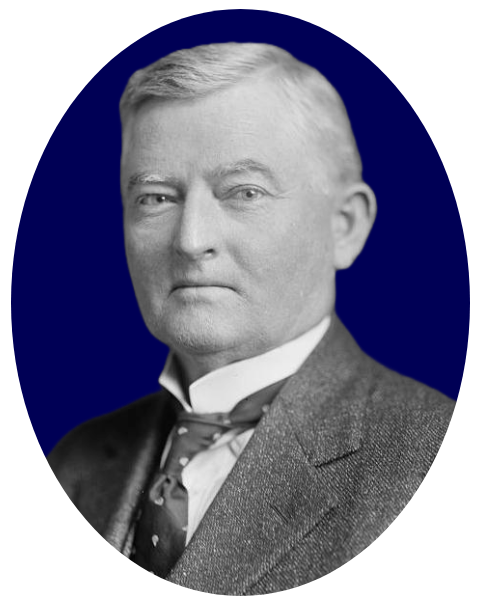
- Nominees; Roosevelt and Garner

Convention
- Date(s): June 27 – July 2, 1932
- City: Chicago, Illinois
- Venue: Chicago Stadium

Candidates
- Presidential nominee: Franklin D. Roosevelt of New York
- Vice-presidential nominee: John N. Garner of Texas

The 1932 Democratic National Convention was held in Chicago, Illinois June 27 – July 2, 1932 at the Chicago Coliseum. The convention resulted in the nomination of Governor Franklin D. Roosevelt of New York for president and Speaker of the House John Nance Garner from Texas for vice president. Beulah Rebecca Hooks Hannah Tingley was a member of the Democratic National Committee and Chair of the Democratic Party of Florida. She seconded the nomination of Franklin Delano Roosevelt, becoming the second woman to address a Democratic National Convention. According to the White House Historical Association, Happy Days Are Here Again was the campaign song of the convention.

== The candidates ==
The three major candidates were:

Candidate	Born	Office Held	State	Delegates, 1st ballot	Final ballot
Franklin D. Roosevelt	January 30, 1882 (age 50); Hyde Park, New York	44th Governor of New York (1929–1932)	New York	666.25	945
Al Smith (campaign)	December 30, 1873 (age 58); Manhattan, New York	42nd Governor of New York (1919–1920, 1923–1928)	New York	201.75	190.25
John Nance Garner	November 22, 1868 (age 63); Detroit, Texas	39th Speaker of the House of Representatives (1931–1933)	Texas	90.25	Nominated for Vice President

== Convention ==
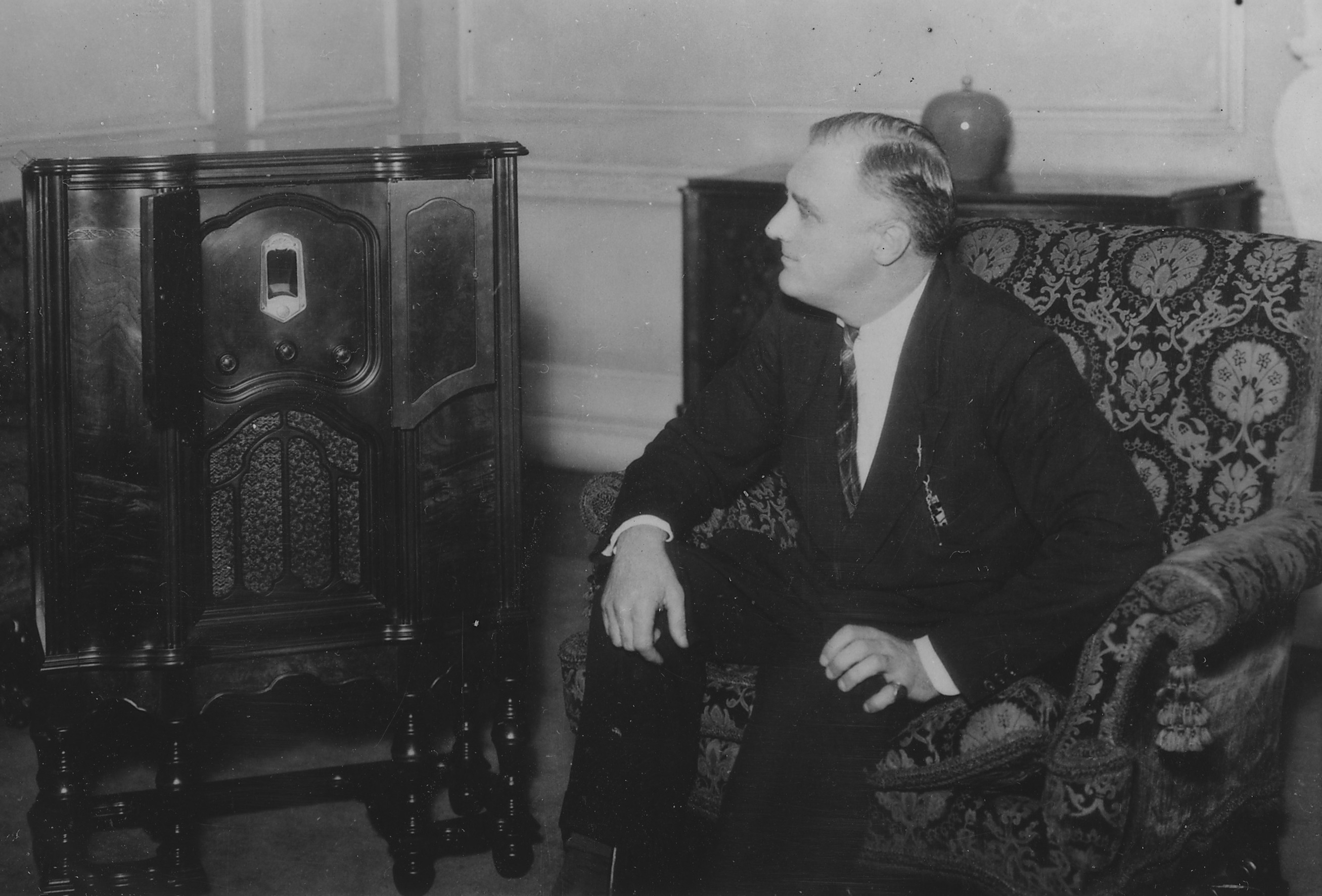
Roosevelt listens to radio coverage of the balloting on July 1 from his residence in Hyde Park

The three major contenders for the presidential nomination were Roosevelt, Garner and former Governor of New York and 1928 presidential candidate, Al Smith, who roughly represented three competing factions of the Democratic Party:

- Smith was supported by the Tammany Hall machine in New York City, and had many supporters in the Democratic National Committee, as well as in Chicago, where Chicago mayor Anton Cermak packed the hall with Smith supporters.
- Roosevelt was supported by a solid majority of the delegates, and also had the support of Senators Burton Wheeler, Cordell Hull, Alben Barkley, and Huey Long, who held the Deep South for Roosevelt.
- Garner had support from two powerful individuals: California newspaper magnate William Randolph Hearst and Senator William Gibbs McAdoo. While he was never a serious threat, and never bothered to campaign for the position, the faction that supported Garner was important because it could break a potential deadlock between Smith and Roosevelt.

The new Democratic coalition would begin at this convention: Roosevelt brought into the Democratic fold western progressives, ethnic minorities, rural farmers, and intellectuals. Supporters of Roosevelt pushed for the abolition of the two-thirds rule (which required the presidential nominee to win at least two-thirds of the delegate votes), but backlash from Southern delegates forced them to drop the proposal.

After three ballots, Roosevelt was 86.75 votes short of the 769.5 votes required to win the nomination, and his campaign feared that his support had peaked: as none of New York, New Jersey, Massachusetts or Connecticut supported Roosevelt, he needed McAdoo, who led the California delegation, and Garner, who led the Texas delegation.

Roosevelt's campaign was able to persuade Garner to have his delegates vote for Roosevelt, possibly with the help of Hearst: while Hearst disliked Roosevelt, he hated Smith and Newton D. Baker, a possible compromise candidate. After McAdoo (who had been denied the nomination by the two-thirds rule at the 1924 convention) announced that California would back Roosevelt, the convention realized Roosevelt had reached the required 769.5 delegates to win the nomination, which was greeted by wild celebrations. Roosevelt received 945 votes on the fourth ballot to Smith's 190.5.

Garner was nominated for vice-president by acclamation, likely as part of a deal for his delegates. McAdoo had hoped to be on the ticket, but he withdrew after his inclusion was opposed by Hearst.

Presidential Balloting
Candidate	1st	2nd	3rd	4th
Roosevelt	666.25	677.75	682.75	945
Smith	201.75	194.25	190.25	190.50
Garner	90.25	90.25	101.25	0
White	52	50.50	52.50	3
Traylor	42.25	40.25	40.25	0
Reed	24	18	27.50	0
Byrd	25	24	25	0
Ritchie	21	23.50	23.50	3.50
Murray	23	0	0	0
Rogers	0	22	0	0
Baker	8.50	8	8.50	5.50
Cox	0	0	0	1
Not Voting	0	5.50	2.50	5.50

Presidential Balloting / 5th Day of Convention (July 1, 1932)

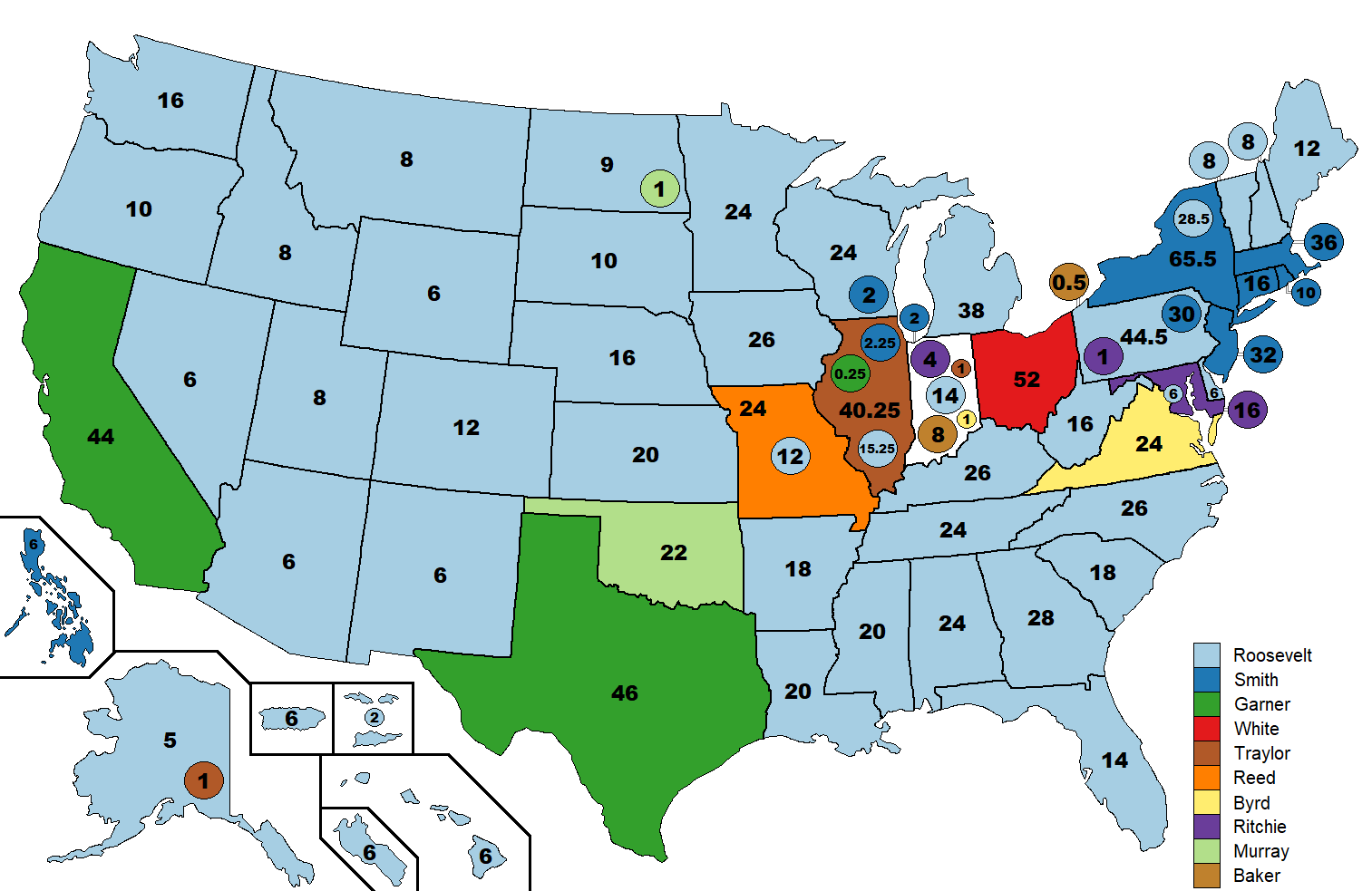
1st Presidential Ballot

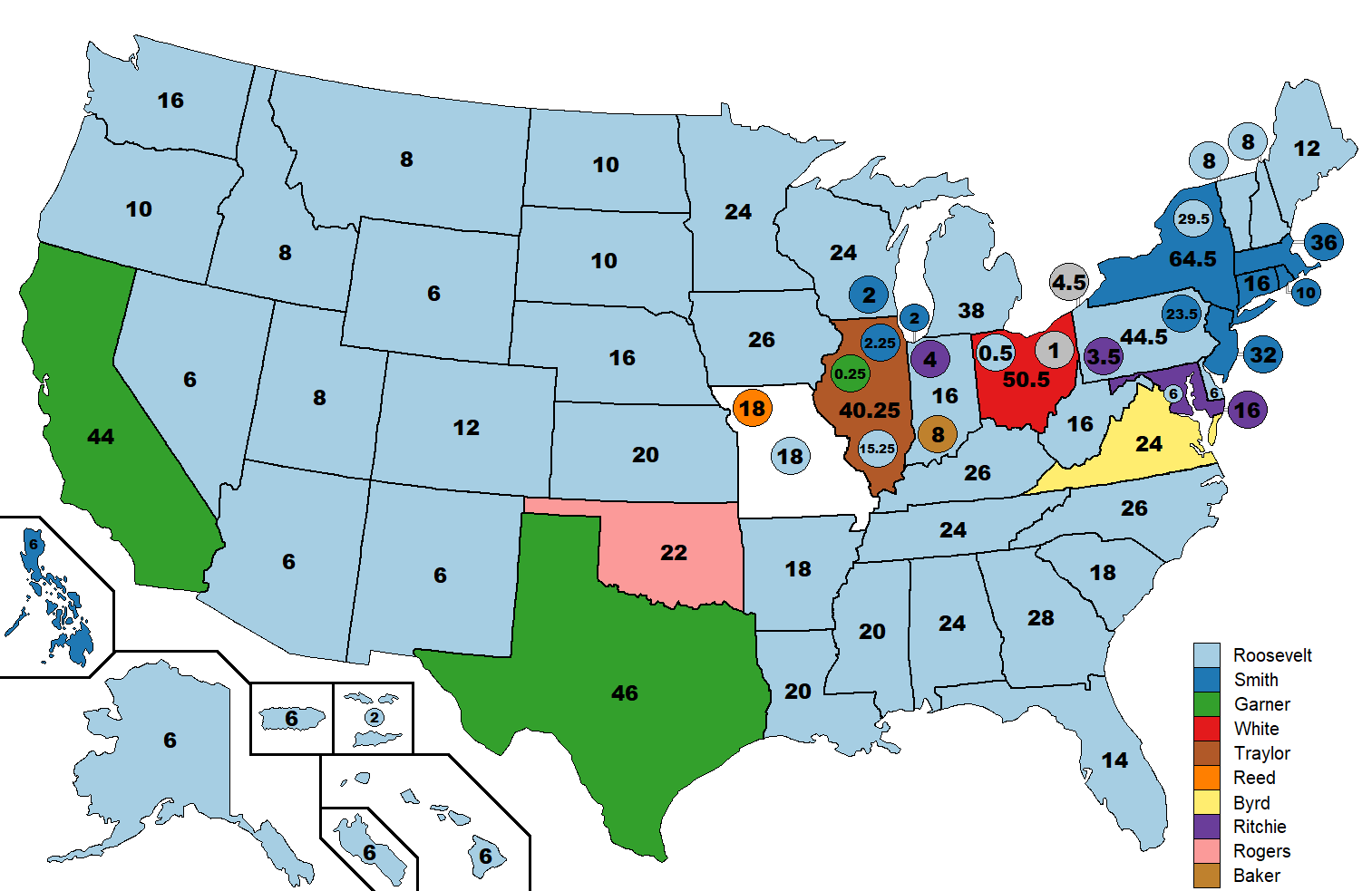
2nd Presidential Ballot

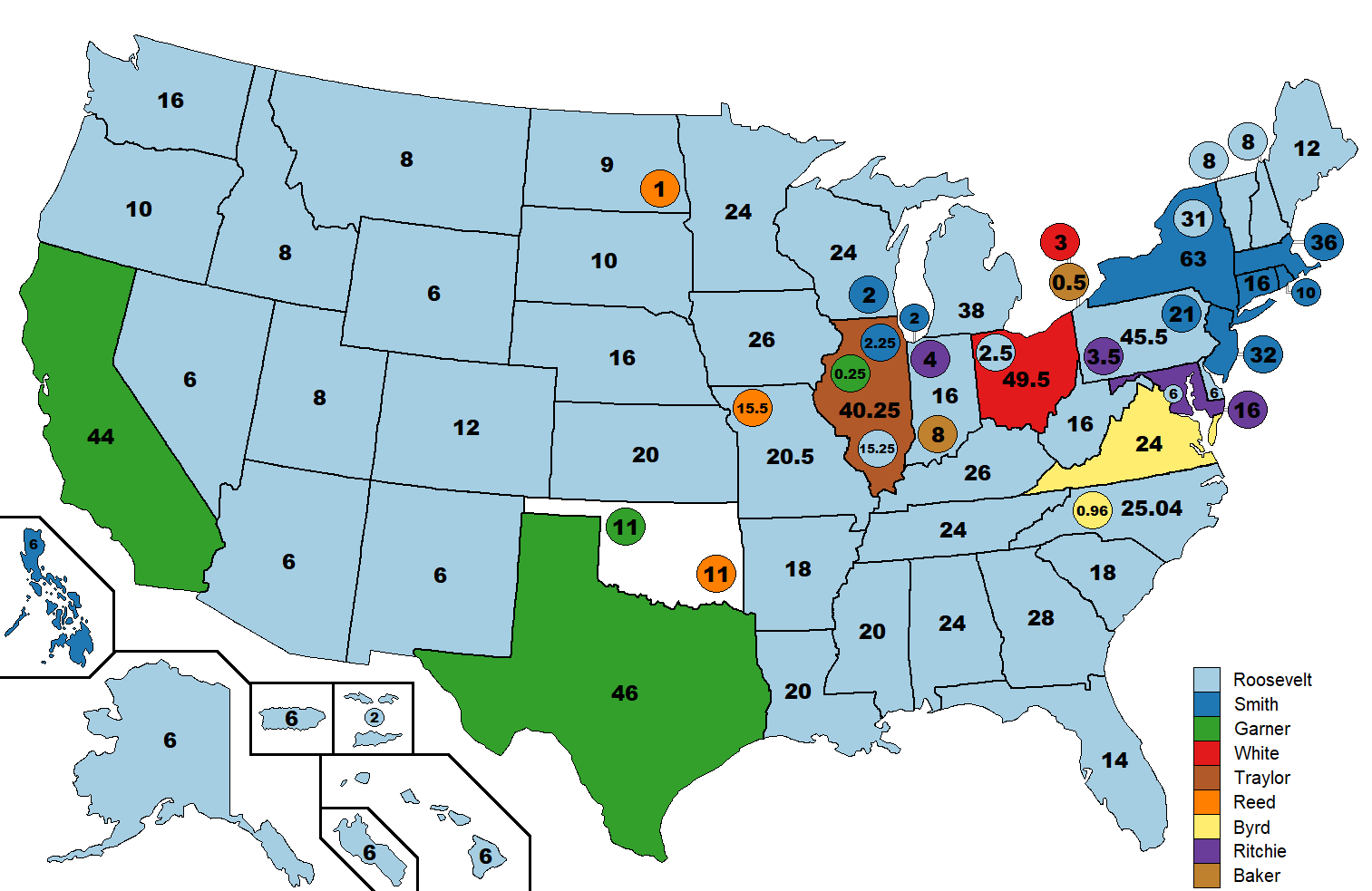
3rd Presidential Ballot

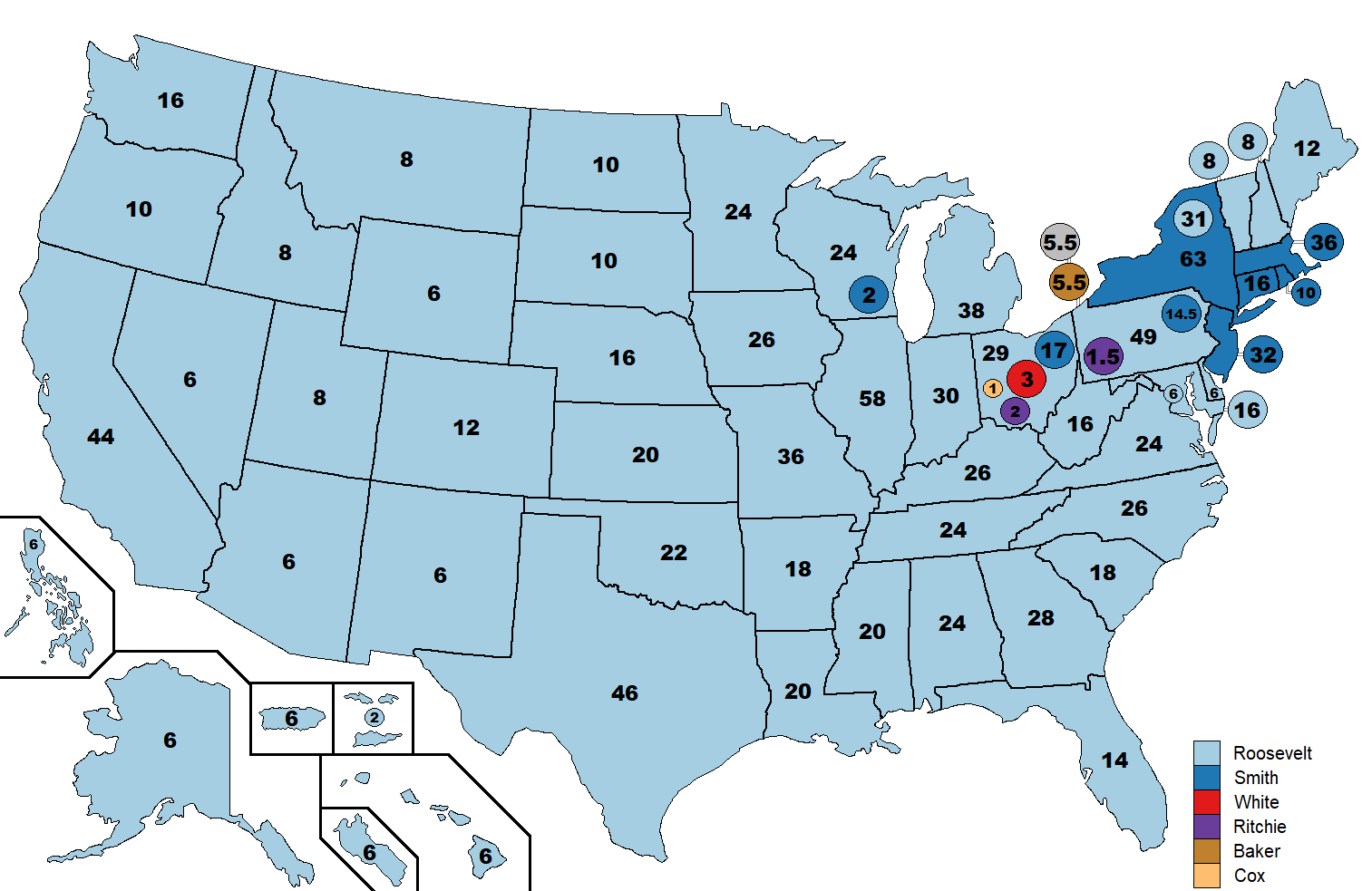
4th Presidential Ballot

=== Roosevelt's acceptance speech ===
Newsreel footage of Roosevelt's acceptance speech

For his acceptance speech, Roosevelt broke tradition and established the precedent of formally accepting the nomination in person at the convention. His personal appearance was essential, to show himself as vigorous despite his physical disability.

In his speech, he pledged "a New Deal for the American people".

== See also ==
- History of the United States Democratic Party
- Democratic Party presidential primaries, 1932
- List of Democratic National Conventions
- U.S. presidential nomination convention
- 1932 Republican National Convention
- Happy Days Are Here Again
- 1932 United States presidential election

Preceded by 1928; Houston, Texas	Democratic National Conventions	Succeeded by 1936; Philadelphia, Pennsylvania
