= 1932 Democratic Party presidential primaries =

Selection of the Democratic Party nominee

- March 8 to May 20, 1932

1,154 delegates to the Democratic National Convention 770 (two-thirds) votes needed to win

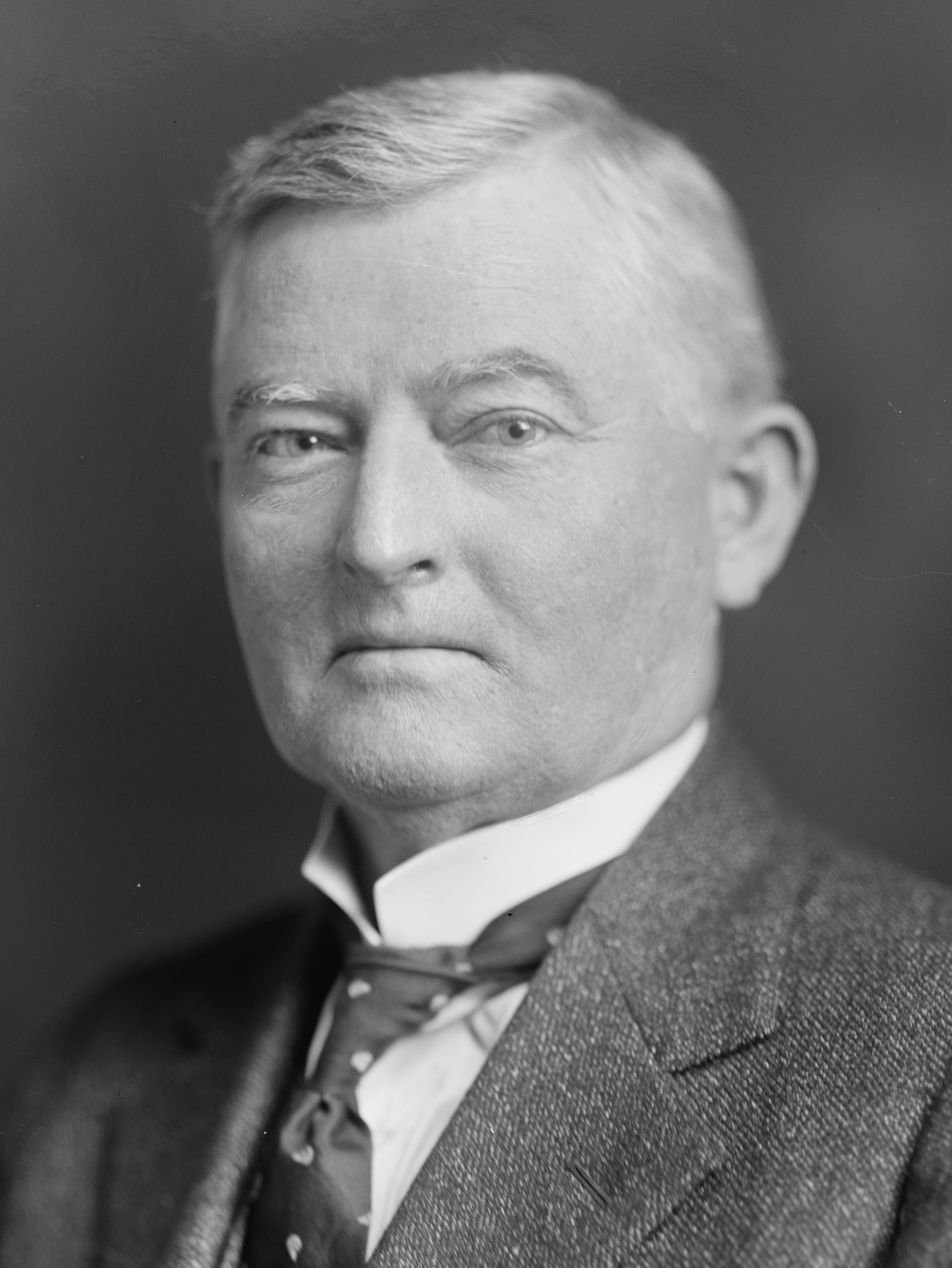
Candidate	Franklin D. Roosevelt	Al Smith	John Nance Garner
Home state	New York	New York	Texas
Delegate count	666.25	201.75	90.25
Contests won	10	2	1
Popular vote	1,464,607	415,795	249,816
Percentage	49.44%	14.04%	8.43%
- Roosevelt Smith Garner Various (Note: Favorite sons received the support of Virginia (Harry F. Byrd), Oklahoma (William H. Murray), Missouri (James A. Reed), Ohio, and Maryland (Albert Ritchie). The Ohio primary was won by Murray.)
Previous Democratic nominee
Al Smith
Democratic nominee
Franklin D. Roosevelt

From March 8 to May 20, 1932, voters and members of the Democratic Party elected delegates to the 1932 Democratic National Convention for the purpose of nominating a candidate for president in the 1932 United States presidential election. New York Governor Franklin D. Roosevelt was selected as the nominee through a series of primary elections and caucuses culminating in the 1932 Democratic National Convention held from June 27 to July 2, 1932, in Chicago, Illinois.

== Background ==
Al Smith was the unsuccessful Democratic nominee for president in 1928. After receiving the Democratic nomination, Smith was prohibited by New York law from simultaneously running for reelection in the 1928 gubernatorial election. Smith persuaded his then-ally Franklin D. Roosevelt to run in his place. Roosevelt won.

Though Smith's initial plan was to use the 1928 campaign as a springboard to the White House in 1932, he demurred following his defeat, loosening his grip on both the Democratic National Committee and Tammany Hall and instructing several inquirers, including Roosevelt, that he would not seek the White House in 1932. However, Smith began to reconsider his decision following a series of snubs by Roosevelt, his own dissatisfaction with the private sector, and the rising odds of a Democratic victory over Herbert Hoover following the 1929 stock market crash and ensuing Great Depression.

Beginning the day after his 1931 inauguration for a second term as Governor of New York, Roosevelt allowed his aides Louis Howe and James Farley to float his name as a potential candidate for president in 1932.

An early test of Roosevelt's strength came when Democratic National Committee chairman John Jakob Raskob floated a proposal to have the party endorse the repeal of Prohibition and the Smoot–Hawley Tariff Act, both positions unpopular with Roosevelt's potential base in the South and West. Endorsing the tariff would also signal a boost to Smith's bid for a second nomination for president, since Smith had already endorsed it. Defying Raskob's expectations, Roosevelt opposed the motion and gathered enough support to force Raskob to withdraw both proposals at the March 5 meeting, thereby solidifying his support in the South and West. Regional leaders like Cordell Hull began to rally behind Roosevelt's potential candidacy.

Roosevelt and his supporters spent much of 1931 cultivating support from party leaders and potential delegates in the South and West. Roosevelt secured endorsements from Hull, Pat Harrison, James F. Byrnes, and Richard Russell Jr. These conversations, along with internal polling conducted by Jesse I. Straus and the Scripps-Howard newspaper agency, convinced Roosevelt that he was a serious front-runner for the nomination.

At the January 9, 1932 national committee meeting, Roosevelt's allies successfully moved to place the 1932 convention in Chicago and elevate an ally to secretary of the party. On January 23, Roosevelt officially announced his candidacy.

In February 1932, Smith publicly commented that he “would place [his] cause in the hands of the people and risk [his] chances without making an active campaign for the nomination.” While this was not a clear declaration of candidacy, political observers saw this as an indication that Smith was making himself available as a “Stop Roosevelt” candidate ahead of the first primary contest, which would be held in New Hampshire.

== Candidates ==
Candidate	Born	Office Held	State	Delegates
Franklin Delano Roosevelt	January 30, 1882 (age 50); Hyde Park, New York	44th Governor of New York (1929–1932)	New York	666.25

Candidate	Born	Office Held	State	Delegates
Al Smith (Campaign)	December 30, 1873 (age 58); Manhattan, New York	42nd Governor of New York (1919–1920, 1923–1928)	New York	201.75
John Nance Garner	November 22, 1868 (age 63); Detroit, Texas	39th Speaker of the House of Representatives (1931–1933)	Texas	90.25

== Primaries and results ==
Date	Contest	Delegates	Roosevelt	Lewis	Smith	Garner	Murray	Leo J. Chassee	Uncommitted	Others
March 8	New Hampshire primary	8	8; 61.87% (15,401)	-	-	-	-	-	-	-
March 15	North Dakota primary		9; 61.91% (52,000)	-	-	-	1; 38.10% (32,000)	-	-	-
March 23	Georgia primary		90.29% (51,498)	-	-	-	-	-	-	9.71% (5,541) (Note: Favorite son Gus H. Howard.)
April 5	Wisconsin primary		98.57% (241,742)	-	1.43% (W) (3,502)	-	-	-	-	-
April 12	Nebraska primary		62.99% (91,393)	-	-	18.86% (27,359)	17.38% (25,214)	-	-	0.77% (1,121)
April 13	Illinois primary	58	0.18% (W) (1,084)	58; 99.76% (590,130)	0.05% (W) (266)	0.01% (W) (35)	-	-	-	0.01% (W) (37)
April 26	Massachusetts primary		26.89% (56,454)	-	73.11% (153,465)	-	-	-	-	-
April 26	Pennsylvania primary		56.65% (133,002)	-	43.11% (101,227)	-	-	-	-	-
May 3	Alabama primary		100.00% (134,781)	-	-	-	-	-	-	-
May 3	California primary		32.47% (175,008)	-	26.26% (141,517)	41.27% (222,385)	-	-	-	-
May 3	South Dakota primary		100.00% (35,370)	-	-	-	-	-	-	-
May 10	Ohio primary		1.71% (W) (1,999)	-	0.82% (W) (951)	0.06% (W) (72)	96.45% (112,512)	-	-	0.96% (W) (1,123)
May 10	West Virginia primary		90.32% (219,671)	-	-	-	8.15% (19,826)	1.53% (3,727)	-	-
May 17	New Jersey primary		36.27% (W) (3,219)	-	58.97% (W) (5,234)	1.56% (W) (138)	-	-	-	3.20% (W) (285)
May 20	Oregon primary		78.62% (48,554)	-	-	-	19.42% (11,993)	-	-	1.97% (1,214)
June 7	Florida primary		87.71% (203,372)	-	-	-	10.72% (24,847)	1.57% (3,645)	-	-

Legend:	1st place(popular vote)	2nd place(popular vote)	3rd place(popular vote)	Candidate has Withdrawnor Ceased Campaigning	(W) - Votes are Write-In

== Delegates not selected in primaries ==
Many delegations were not selected in public statewide primaries. The following table shows delegates awarded at a state level by convention, committees, and other means that did not involve votes by a public electorate.

Delegates not awarded via primaries
Other delegate allocation
Date	Contest	Delegates	Roosevelt	Lewis	Smith	Garner	Murray	Leo J. Chassee	Uncommitted	Others
January 23	Territory of Alaska convention	6	6	-	-	-	-	-	-	-
January	Washington county caucuses	16	16 (Note: Roosevelt did not win all 16 delegates at the county caucuses, but county delegates to the state convention were instructed to vote for Roosevelt delegates. When the state convention was eventually held, Roosevelt swept the delegates.)	-	-	-	-	-	-	-
February	Oklahoma convention	22	-	-	-	-	22	-	-	-
March 12	Minnesota convention	24	24 (Note: Smith supporters stormed out of the convention and held a rump convention nominating their own slate of 24 delegates to contest credentials at the Chicago convention.)	-	-	-	-	-	-	-
March 29	Iowa convention		26							
March 29	Maine convention		12							
March	Missouri convention									36 (Note: Favorite son James A. Reed, though party boss Tom Pendergast had privately pledged support to Roosevelt as necessary.)
March	Maryland convention									(Note: Maryland's delegates were pledged to favorite son Albert Ritchie.)
March	Arkansas convention								18	

== See also ==
- Republican Party presidential primaries, 1932
- White primary
