= 1932 Republican National Convention =

American political convention

- 1932 presidential election
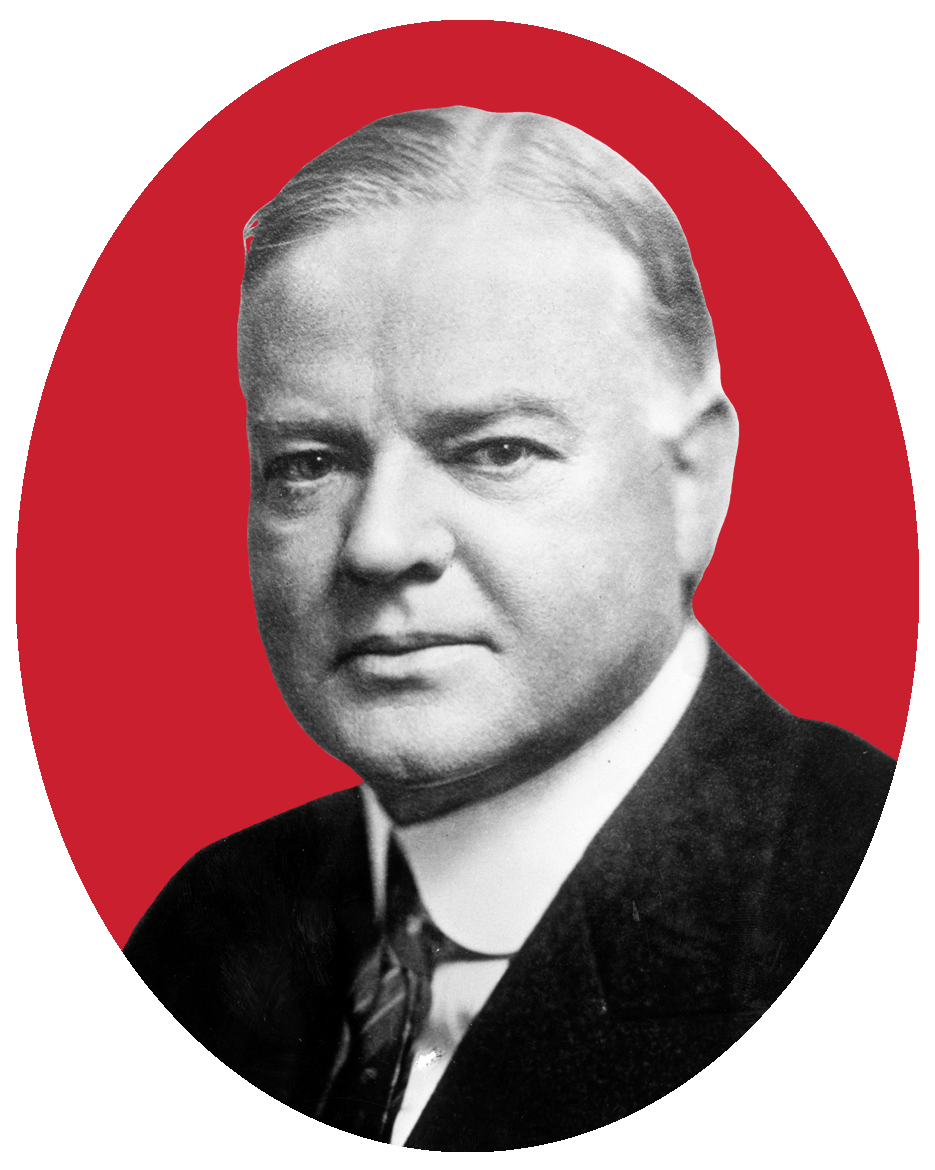
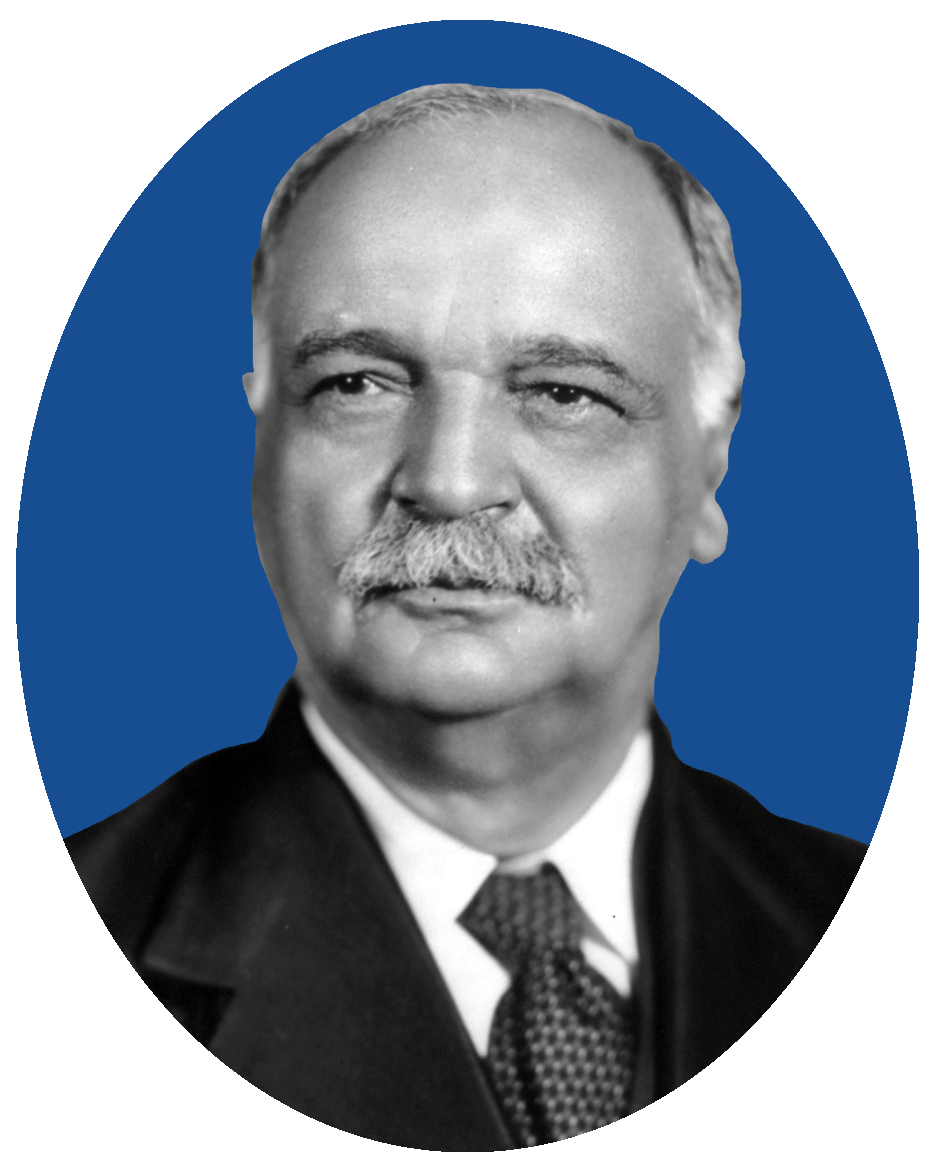
- Nominees; Hoover and Curtis

Convention
- Dates: June 14–16, 1932
- City: Chicago, Illinois
- Venue: Chicago Stadium

Candidates
- Presidential nominee: Herbert C. Hoover of California
- Vice-presidential nominee: Charles Curtis of Kansas
- Results (president): Herbert Hoover (CA): 1126.5 (98.5%); John J. Blaine: 13; Calvin Coolidge: 4.5; Joseph Irwin France: 4 James W. Wadsworth: 1

The 1932 Republican National Convention was held at Chicago Stadium in Chicago, Illinois, from June 14 to June 16, 1932. It nominated President Herbert Hoover and Vice President Charles Curtis for reelection.

Hoover was virtually unopposed for the nomination. Despite the economic crisis facing the country, the convention praised Hoover and pledged itself to maintain a balanced budget.

== Presidential nomination ==
=== Presidential candidates ===
President
Herbert Hoover
of California

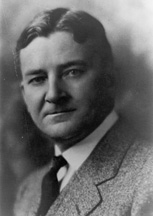
Senator
John J. Blaine
of Wisconsin
(Not Nominated)

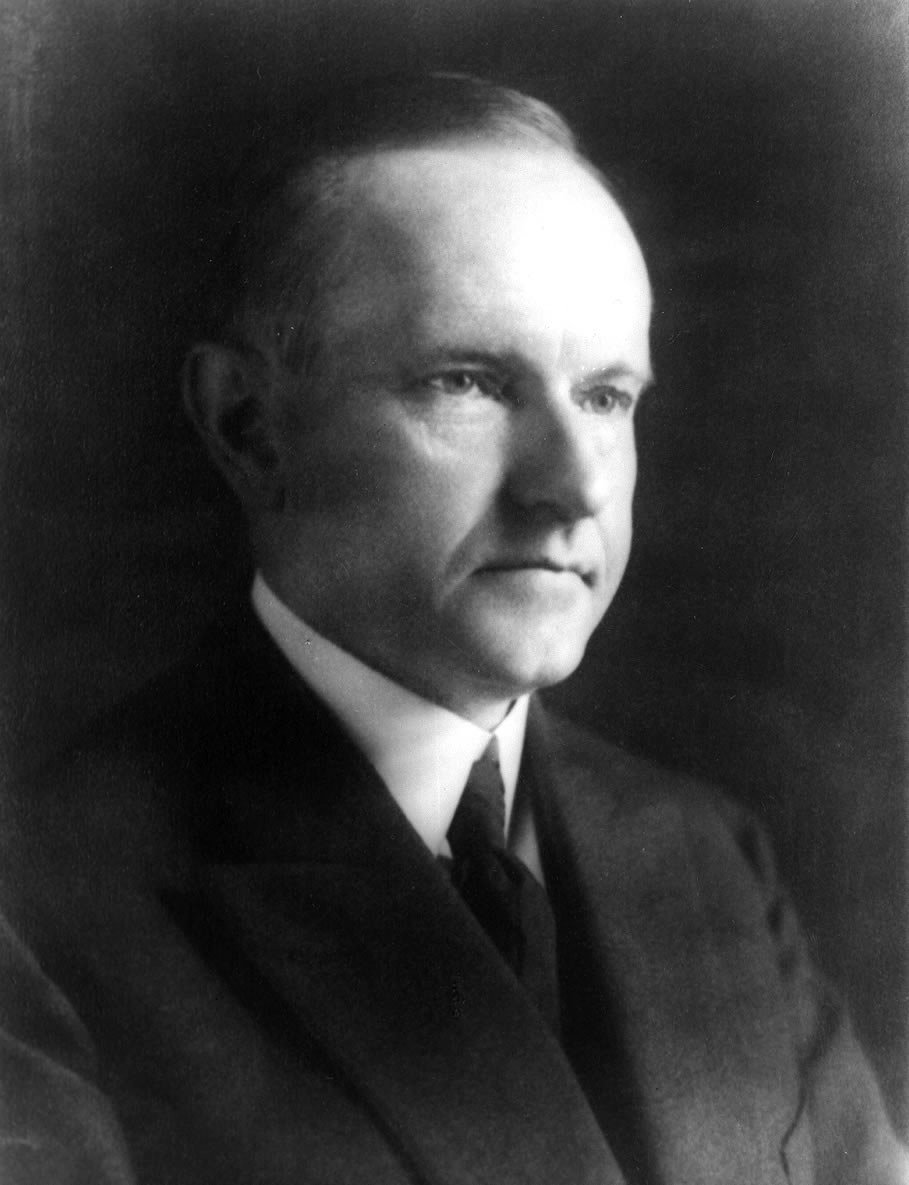
Former President
Calvin Coolidge
of Massachusetts
(Not Nominated)

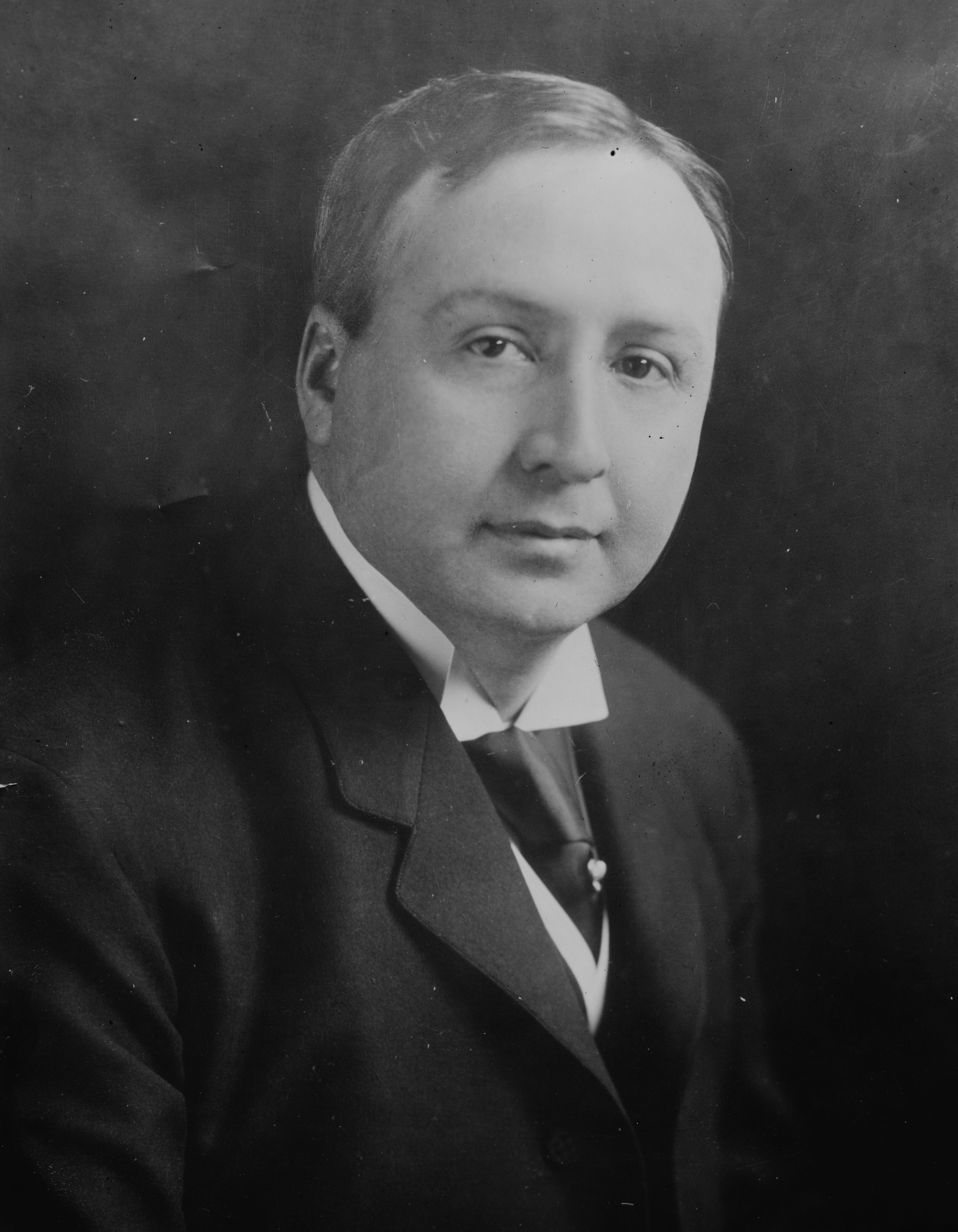
Former Senator
Joseph I. France
of Maryland

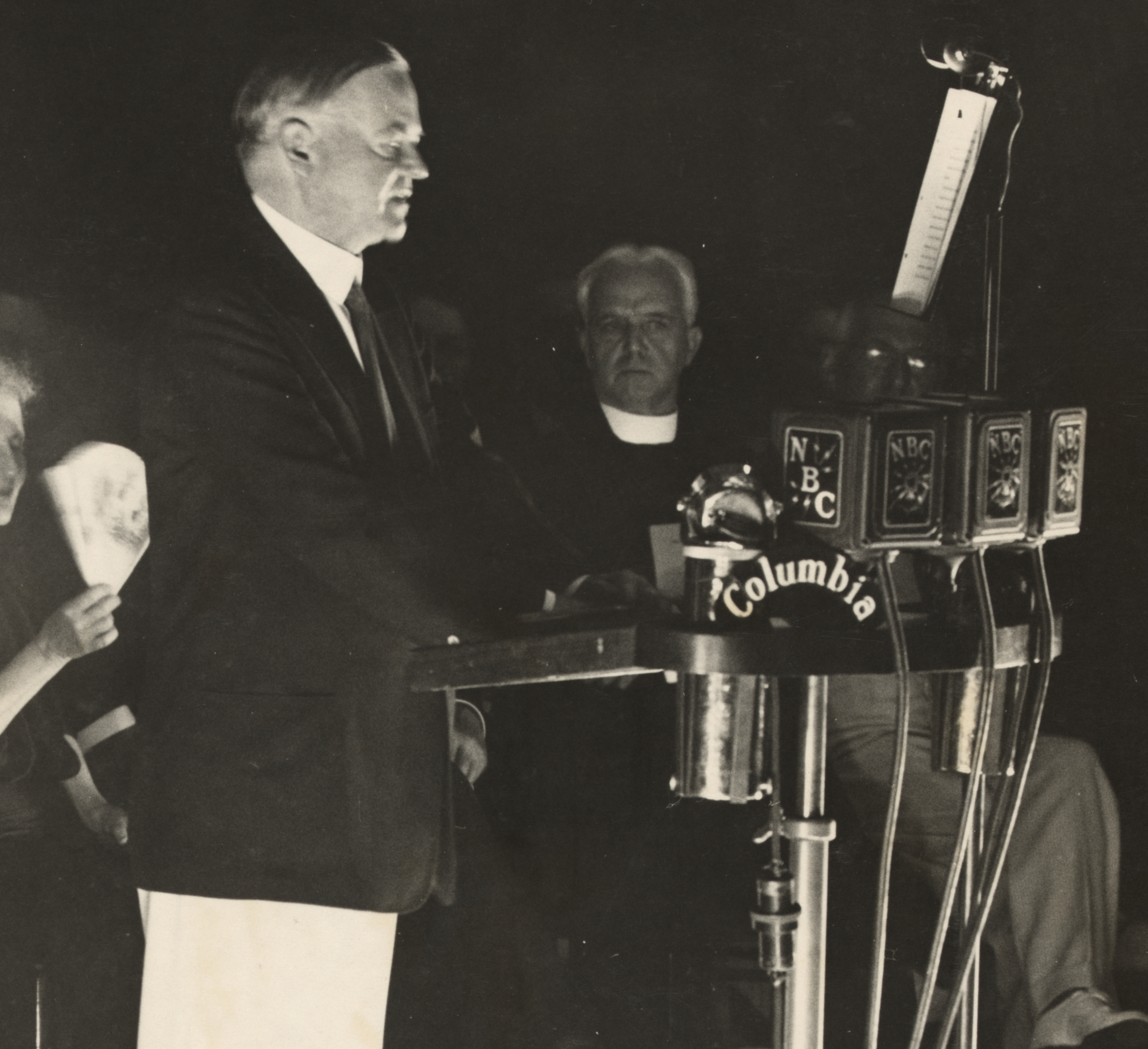
Hoover accepts his nomination from Washington

Republicans gloomily gathered in Chicago for the 20th Republican National Convention. Los Angeles attorney Joseph Scott delivered President Hoover's nominating address, praising him as the man who taught the nation to resist the temptations of governmental paternalism. Hoover was re-nominated on the first ballot without significant opposition. To have repudiated the incumbent would have destroyed what little chance of victory the party had amid the worst economic depression in U.S. history.

Former Senator Joseph I. France of Maryland attempted to engineer a "draft Coolidge" movement, but the former president expressed no interest in the nomination.

Presidential Ballot
Candidate	1st	Unanimous
Hoover	1,126.5	1,154
Blaine	13	
Coolidge	4.5	
France	4	
Dawes	1	
Wadsworth	1	
Not Voting	3	
Absent	1	

Presidential Balloting / 3rd Day of Convention (June 16, 1932)

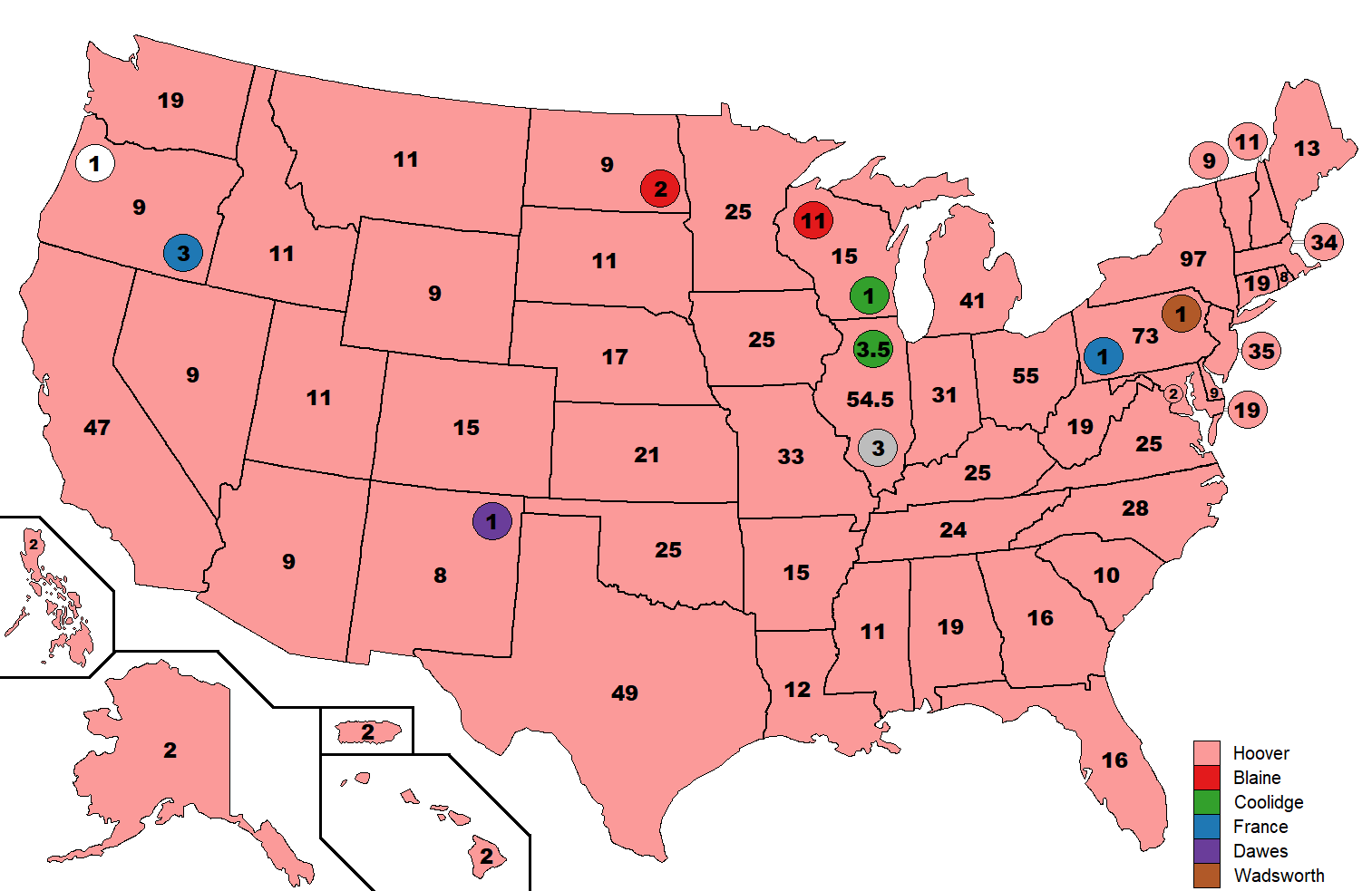
1st Presidential Ballot

== Vice Presidential nomination ==
=== Vice Presidential candidates ===
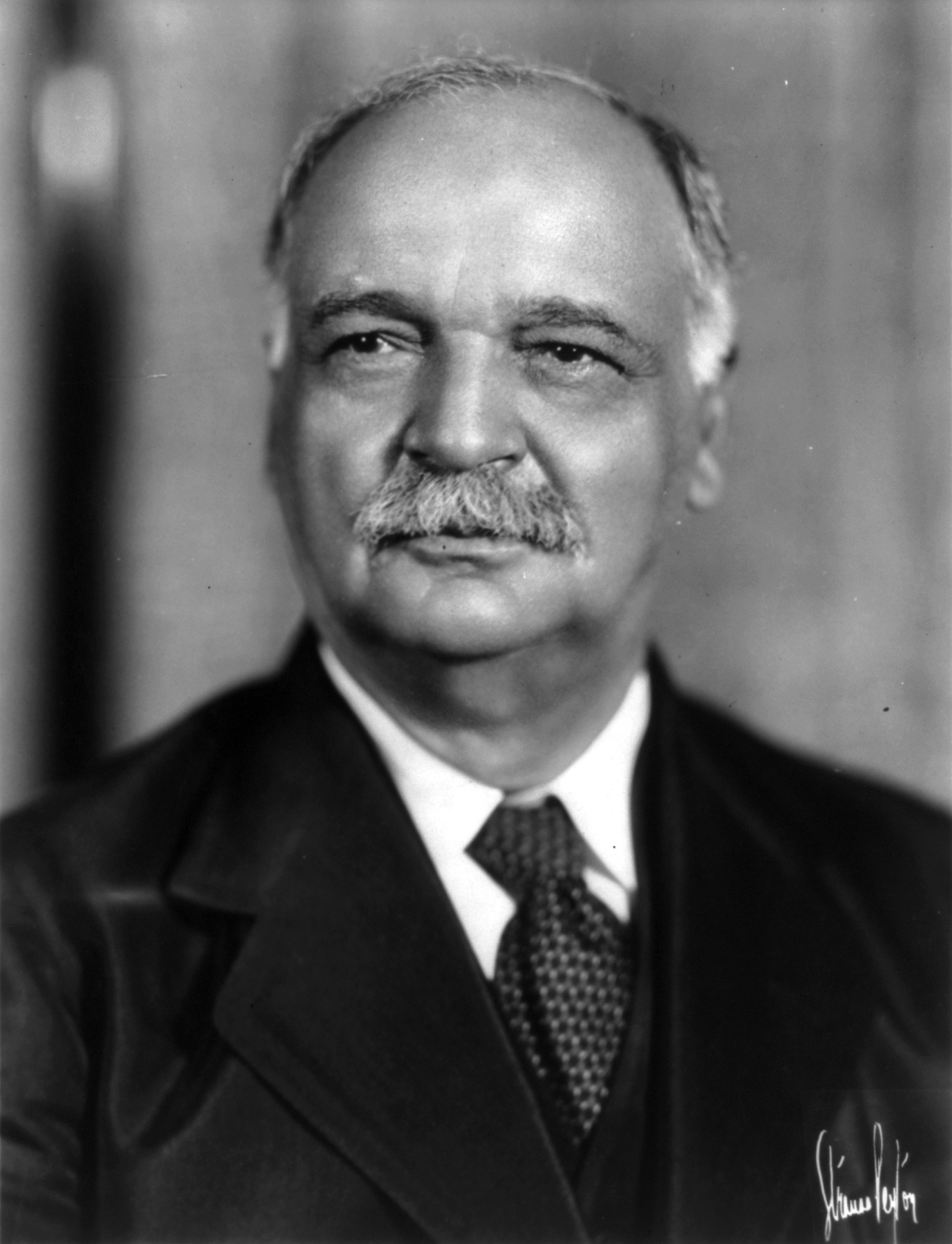
Vice President
Charles Curtis
of Kansas

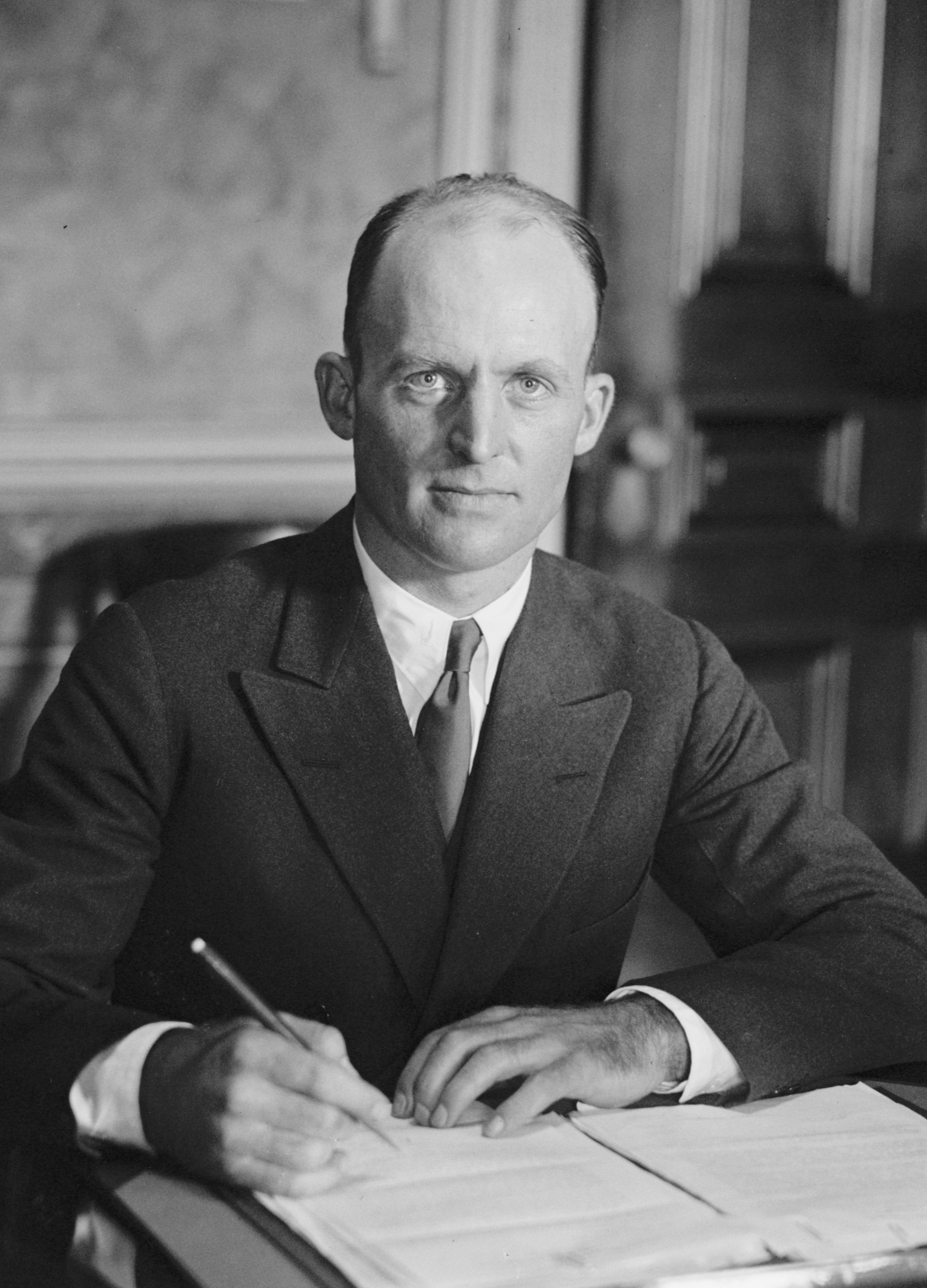
Ambassador
Hanford MacNider
of Iowa

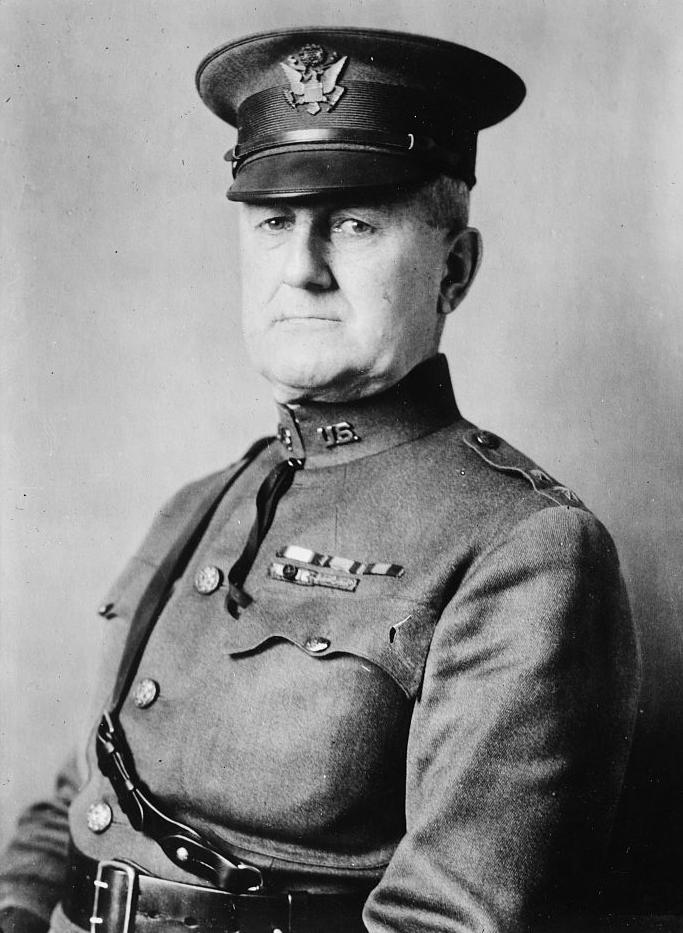
Major General
James Harbord
of New York

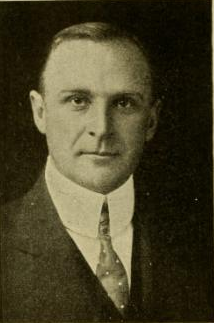
Former Governor
Alvan T. Fuller
of Massachusetts

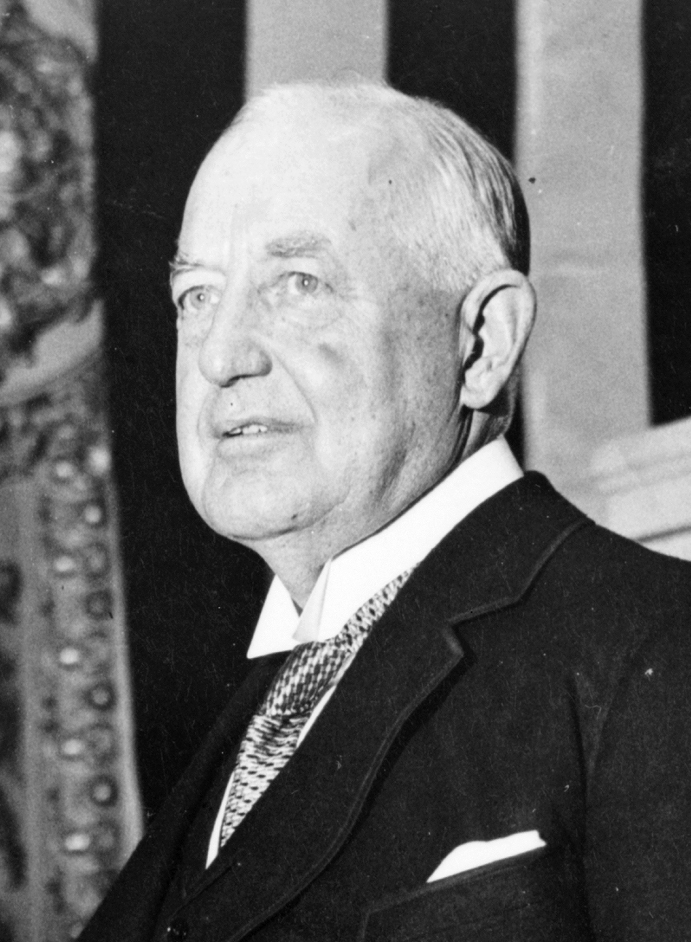
House Minority Leader
Bertrand Snell
of New York
(Declined Consideration)

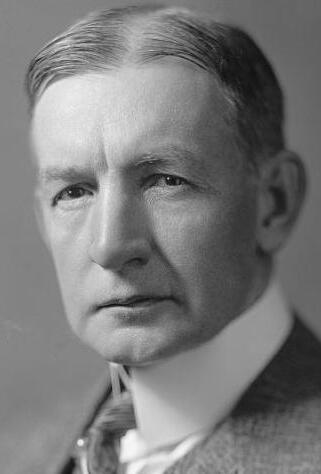
Former Vice President
Charles G. Dawes
of Illinois
(Not Nominated -
Declined Consideration)

Vice President Curtis experienced more difficulties than President Hoover in securing his party's re-nomination. It took the fervid appeals of Hoover's cabinet members to keep the Illinois delegation from nominating former Vice President Charles Dawes for his old office. Curtis nonetheless still had to fight for his re-nomination despite the disorganization of his opposition by the advance refusal of Dawes to accept the nomination for second place. Ambassador Hanford MacNider and RCA Chairman James Harbord, both military professionals, were the primary beneficiaries of the opposition to Curtis.

The initial roll call revealed Curtis to be 18 votes shy of securing re-nomination. At this point, Pennsylvania switched its 75 votes from favorite son Edward Martin to Curtis. After Curtis had secured the vice presidential nomination, the delegates moved to make his re-nomination unanimous.

Vice Presidential Ballot
Candidate	1st (Before Shifts)	1st (After Shifts)	Unanimous
Curtis	559.25	634.25	1,154
MacNider	178.75	178.75	
Harbord	161.75	161.75	
Martin	75	0	
Fuller	57	57	
Snell	56	56	
Replogle	23.75	23.75	
Couzens	11	11	
Dawes	9.75	9.75	
Ingalls	5	5	
Hurley	2	2	
Kenyon	2	2	
Bingham	1	1	
Morgan	1	1	
Not Voting	9.75	9.75	
Absent	1	1	

Vice Presidential Balloting / 3rd Day of Convention (June 16, 1932)

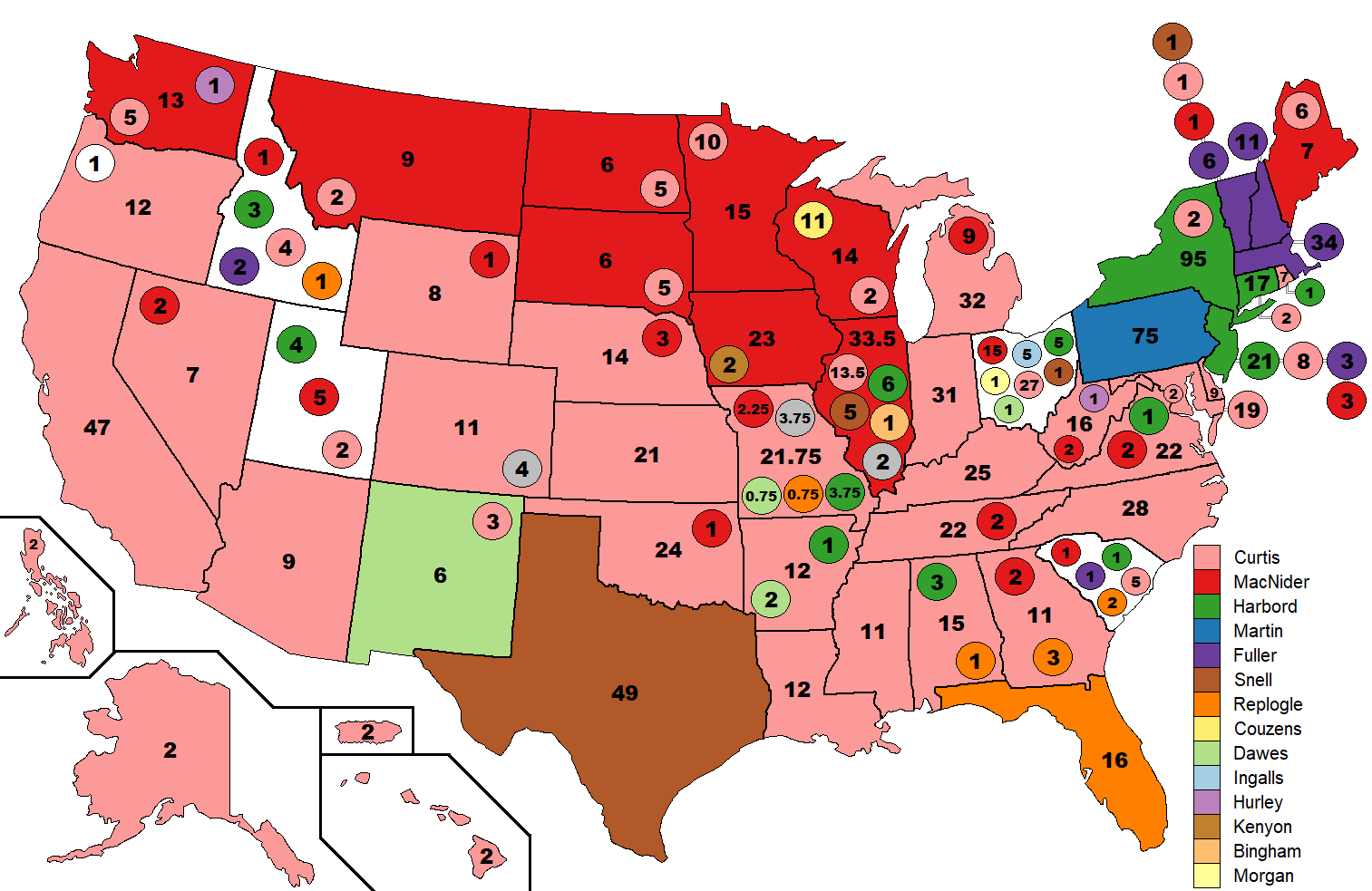
1st
Vice Presidential Ballot
(Before Shifts)

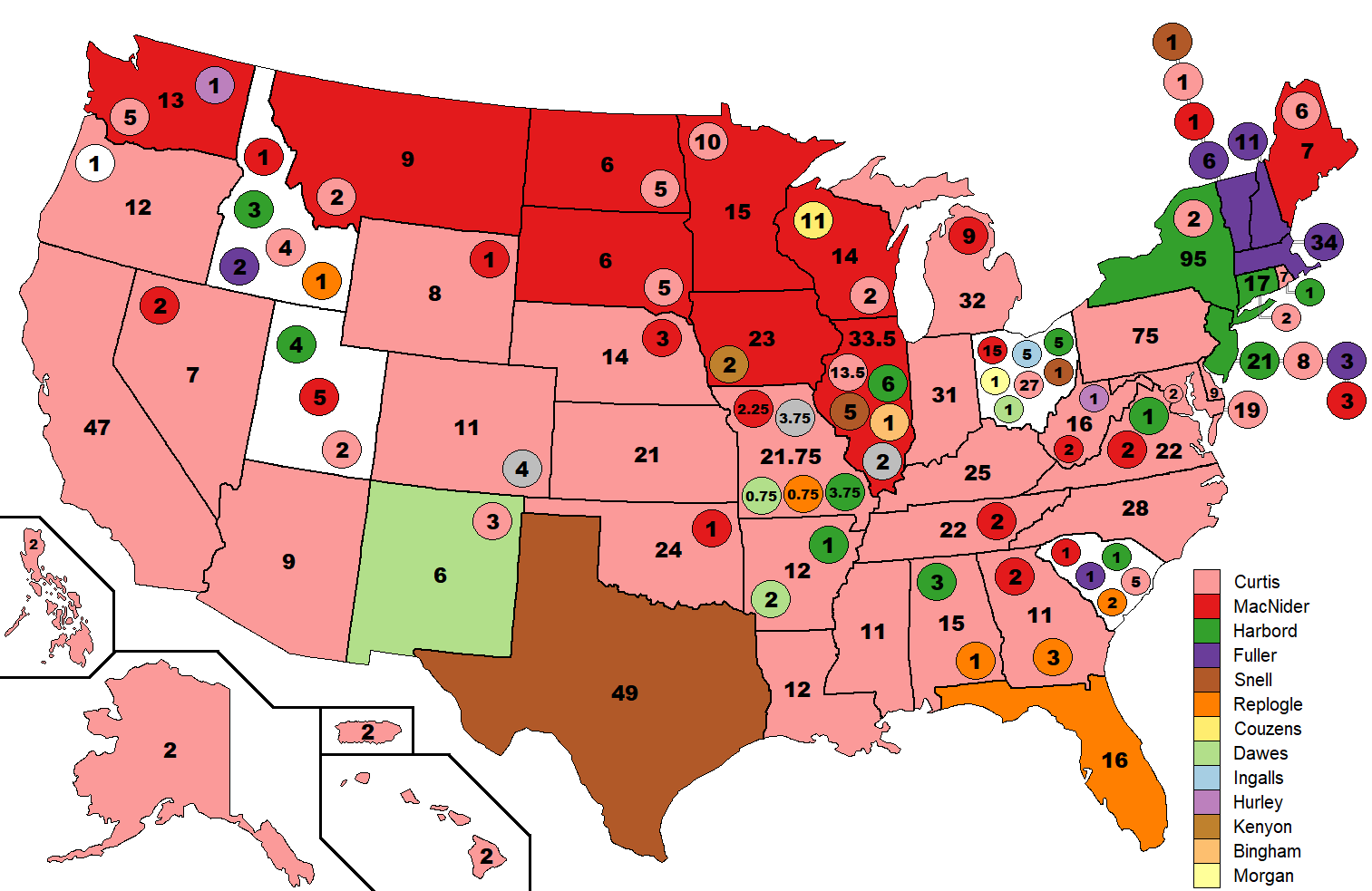
1st
Vice Presidential Ballot
(After Shifts)

== See also ==
- History of the United States Republican Party
- List of Republican National Conventions
- United States presidential nominating convention
- 1932 Republican Party presidential primaries
- 1932 United States presidential election
- 1932 Democratic National Convention

Preceded by 1928; Kansas City, Missouri	Republican National Conventions	Succeeded by 1936; Cleveland, Ohio
