= 1932 Republican Party presidential primaries =

Selection of Republican US presidential candidate

- March 8 to May 20, 1932
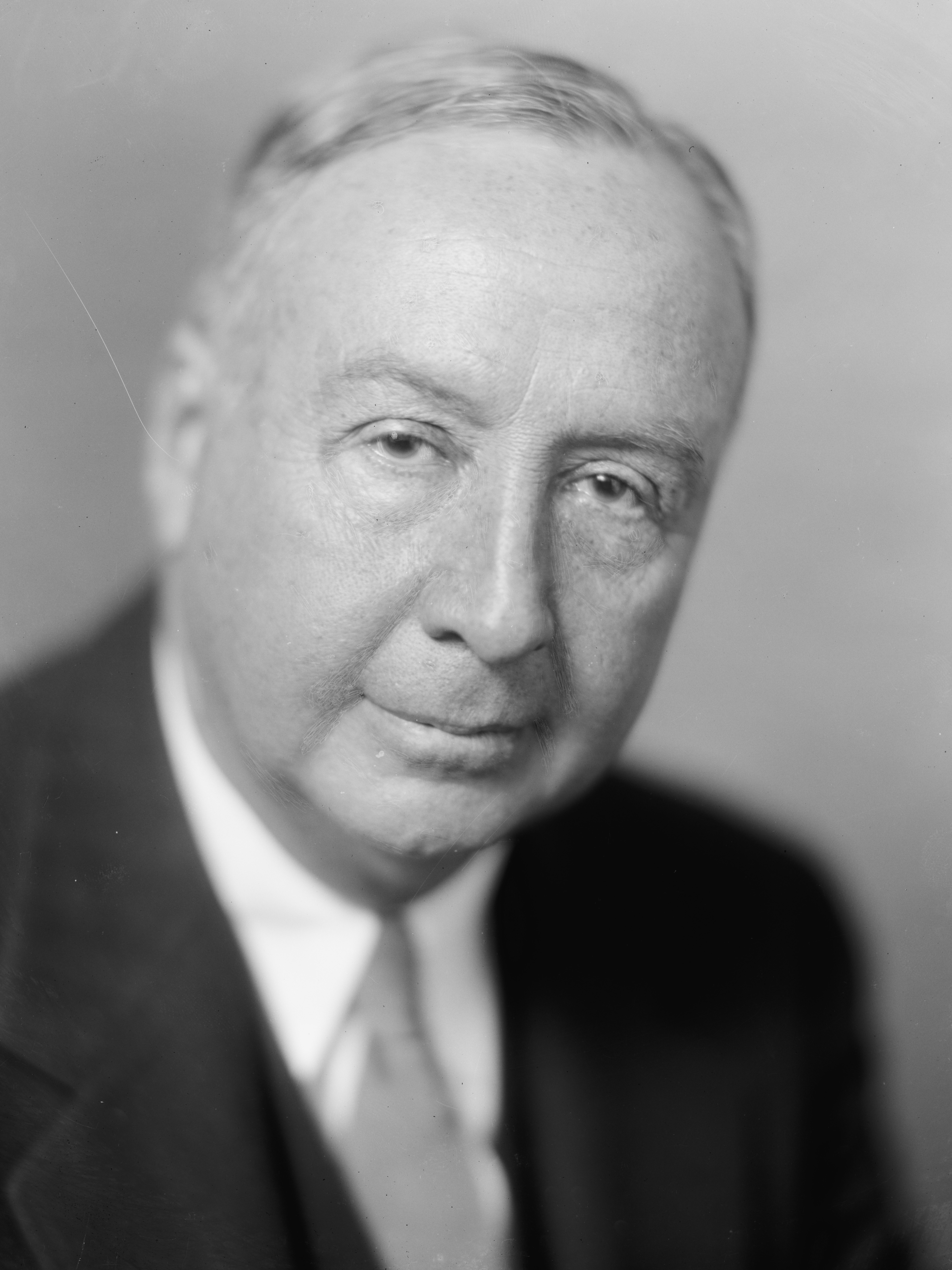

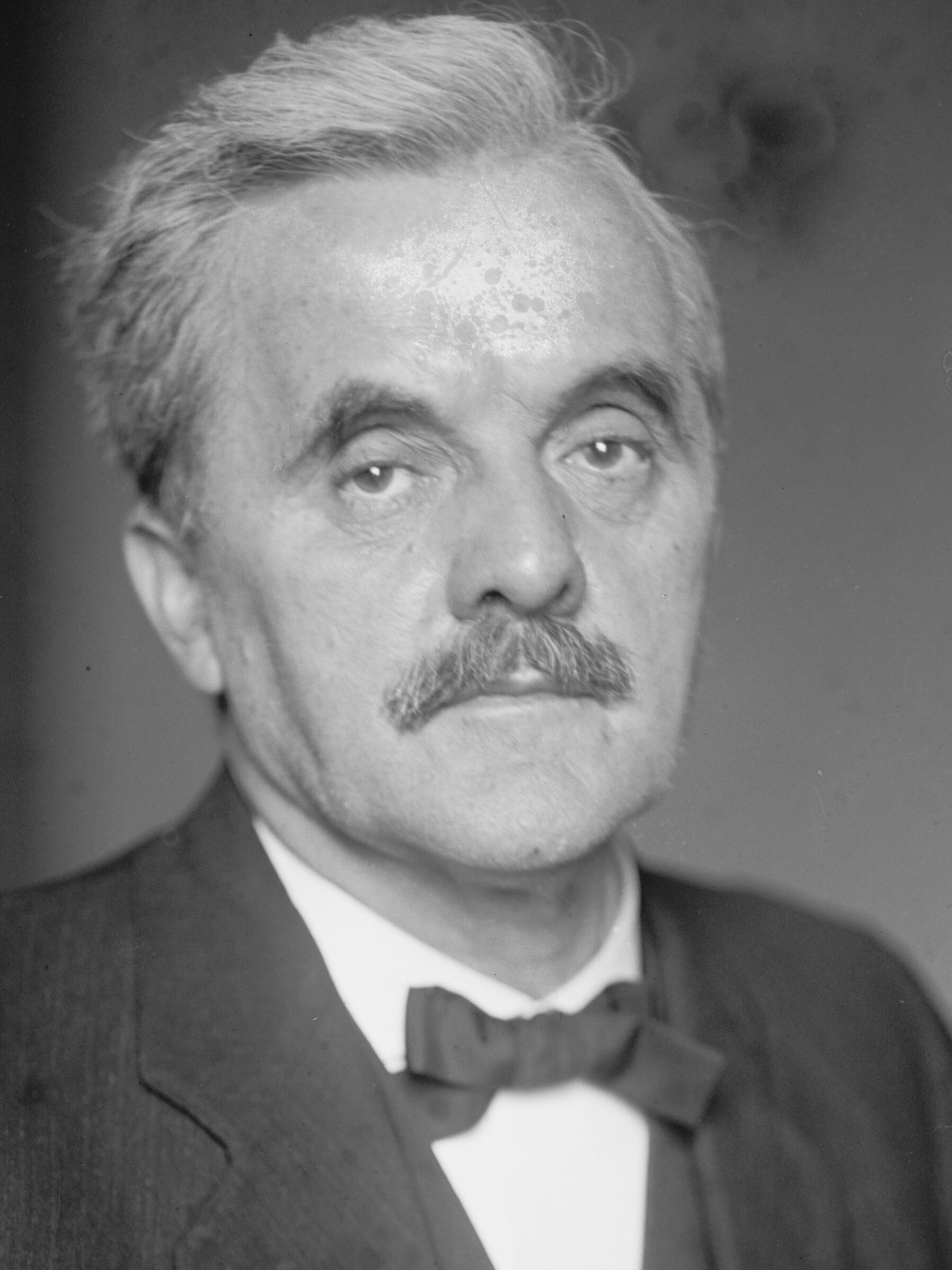

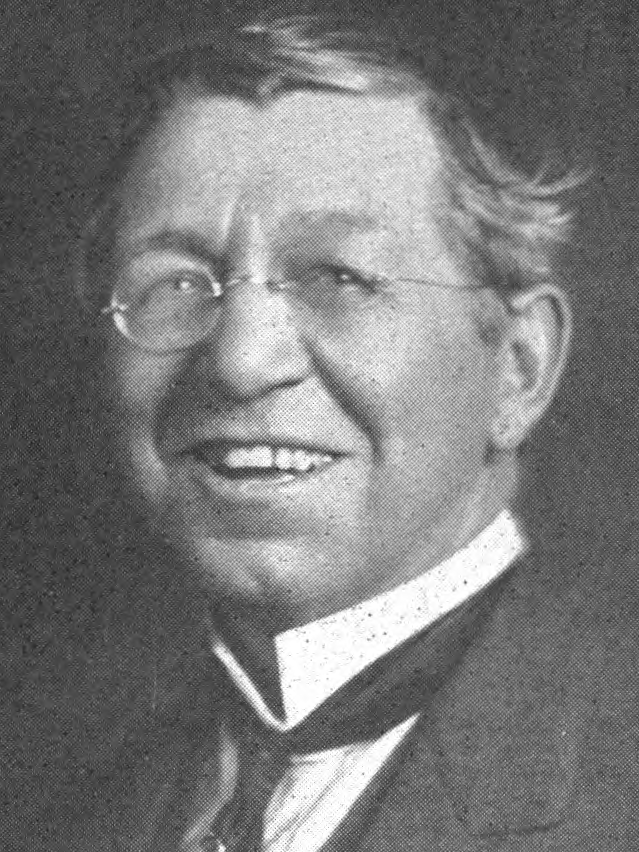

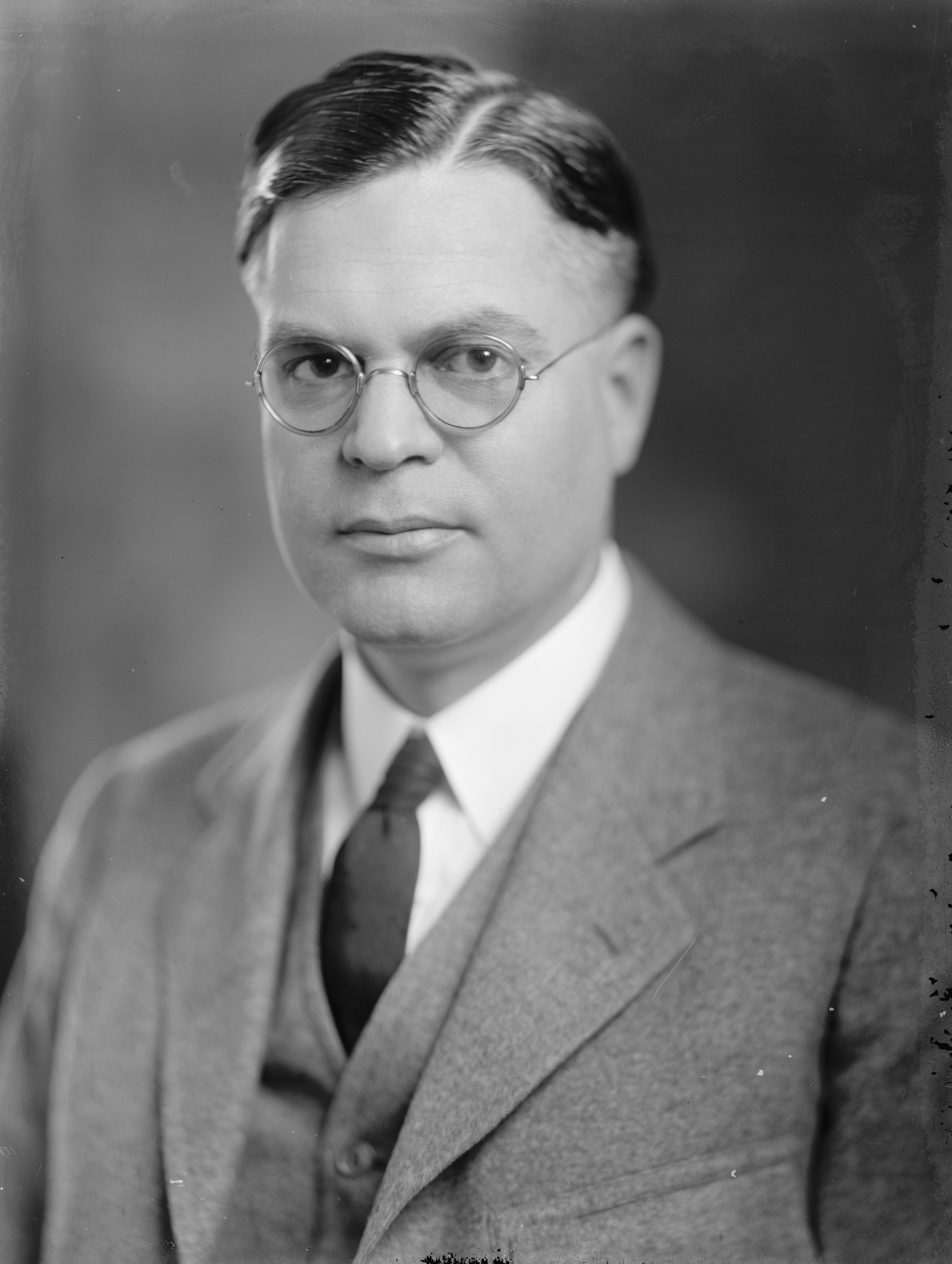
Candidate	Joseph I. France	Herbert Hoover	George W. Norris
Home state	Maryland	Iowa	Nebraska
Contests won	7	4	1
Popular vote	1,137,948	861,602	139,514
Percentage	47.5%	36.0%	5.8%
Candidate	Jacob Coxey	Royal C. Johnson
Home state	Ohio	South Dakota
Contests won	1	1
Popular vote	100,844	64,464
Percentage	4.2%	2.7%
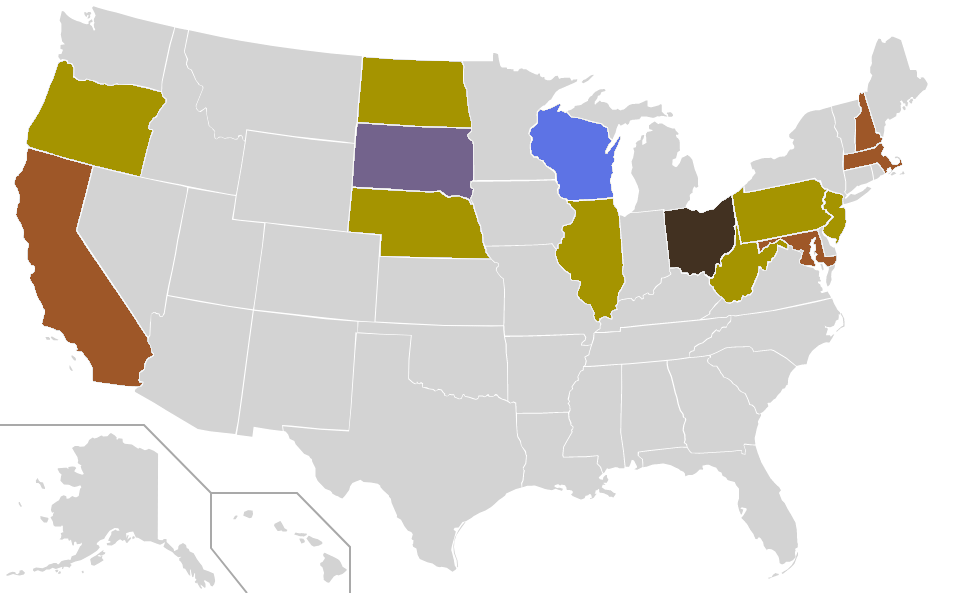
- First place finishes by preference primary results
Previous Republican nominee
Herbert Hoover
Republican nominee
Herbert Hoover

From March 8 to May 20, 1932, voters of the Republican Party elected delegates to the 1932 Republican National Convention, in part to choose the party nominee for president in the 1932 United States presidential election.

Incumbent president Herbert Hoover faced only nominal opposition for the nomination but refrained from participating in the primaries, choosing instead to focus on his ongoing efforts to end the Great Depression. Several minor candidates entered the race, led by former U.S. senator Joseph I. France of Maryland, who staged a quixotic outsider bid for the nomination, running unopposed in several states' non-binding preference primaries but failing to win more than a handful of delegate selection contests.

At the convention, held from June 14 to 16 in Chicago, Illinois, France unsuccessfully argued that his victories in the non-binding preference primaries entitled him to those states' delegates. He was denied credentials to participate in the convention as a delegate and forcibly removed from the convention hall. Hoover was nominated by an overwhelming margin.

== Candidates ==
=== Nominee ===
Candidate	Experience	Home state	Campaign	Popular vote	Contests won	Running mate
Herbert Hoover	President of the United States (1929–1933) U.S. Secretary of Commerce (1921–1928)	California	(Campaign) Secured nomination: June 14, 1932	869,602 (36.0%)	4	Charles Curtis

=== Withdrew during convention ===
Candidate	Experience	Home state	Campaign	Popular vote	Contests won
Joseph I. France	U.S. Senator from Maryland (1917–1923)	Maryland	Lost nomination: June 14, 1932	1,137,948 (47.5%)	7

=== Withdrew before convention ===
Candidate	Experience	Home state	Campaign	Popular vote	Contests won
Jacob Coxey	Mayor of Massillon (1931)	Ohio	[data missing]	100,844 (4.2%)	1
Royal C. Johnson	U.S. Representative from South Dakota (1915–1933)	South Dakota	[data missing]	64,464 (2.7%)	1
George W. Norris	U.S. Senator from Nebraska (1913–1943) U.S. Representative from NE-05 (1903–1913)	Nebraska	[data missing]	139,514 (5.8%)	1

== Primaries ==
Little-known former United States Senator Joseph I. France ran against Hoover in the primaries, but Hoover was often unopposed. France's primary wins were tempered by his defeat to Hoover in his home state of Maryland and the fact that few delegates to the national convention were chosen in the primaries.

Date	Primary	Joseph I. France	Herbert Hoover	George W. Norris	Jacob Coxey	Royal C. Johnson
March 8	New Hampshire	0%	100%	0%	0%	0%
March 15	North Dakota	59%	0%	0%	41%	0%
April 5	Wisconsin	0%	5%	95%	0%	0%
April 12	Nebraska	74%	26%	0%	0%	0%
April 13	Illinois	99%	1%	0%	0%	0%
April 26	Massachusetts	0%	100%	0%	0%	0%
April 26	Pennsylvania	93%	5%	0%	0%	0%
May 2	Maryland	37%	60%	0%	0%	0%
May 3	California	0%	100%	0%	0%	0%
May 3	South Dakota	0%	0%	0%	0%	65%
May 10	Ohio	25%	5%	0%	43%	0%
May 10	West Virginia	100%	0%	0%	0%	0%
May 17	New Jersey	93%	7%	0%	0%	0%
May 20	Oregon	69%	31%	0%	0%	0%

== Convention results ==
Hoover's managers at the Republican National Convention, which met in Chicago between June 14 and 16, ran a tight ship, not allowing expressions of concern for the direction of the nation. He was nominated on the first ballot with 98% of the delegate vote.

The tally was spectacularly lopsided:

Presidential Ballot, RNC 1932
Herbert Hoover	1126.5
John J. Blaine	13
Calvin Coolidge	4.5
Joseph I. France	4
James Wolcott Wadsworth, Jr.	1

Both rural Republicans and hard-money Republicans (the latter hoping to nominate former President Calvin Coolidge) balked at the floor managers and voted against the renomination of Vice President Charles Curtis, who won with just 55% of the delegate votes.

== See also ==
- 1932 Democratic Party presidential primaries
