= Mike Hanes =

American musician (1941-2022)

Michael David Hanes (September 18, 1941 - June 20, 2022) was a professor of Southern Illinois University - School of Music, and former Director of Bands. A native of Salem, Illinois, Hanes made his home with his wife and child in Carbondale, Illinois.

== Education & early career ==
Hanes studied Music Education at Millikin University in Decatur, Illinois, where he completed is Bachelor of Music Education degree. He taught in the public schools of Sandoval, Illinois for one year before returning to school at Southern Illinois University to pursue his Master of Music degree, and serve as graduate assistant to Donald Canedy (then Director of Bands and professor of percussion).

== Time at SIUC ==
During his tenure at Southern Illinois University, Hanes led the SIUC Marching Salukis, from 1965 until 1996. In addition to his work with the Marching Salukis, Hanes also served as the Director of the University Wind Ensemble, and the pit orchestra for the McLeod Theater Summer Playhouse, as well as teaching studio percussion.
