= SIUC School of Music =

School of Music in Carbondale, Illinois

Coordinates: 37°42′59.3″N 89°13′4.5″W

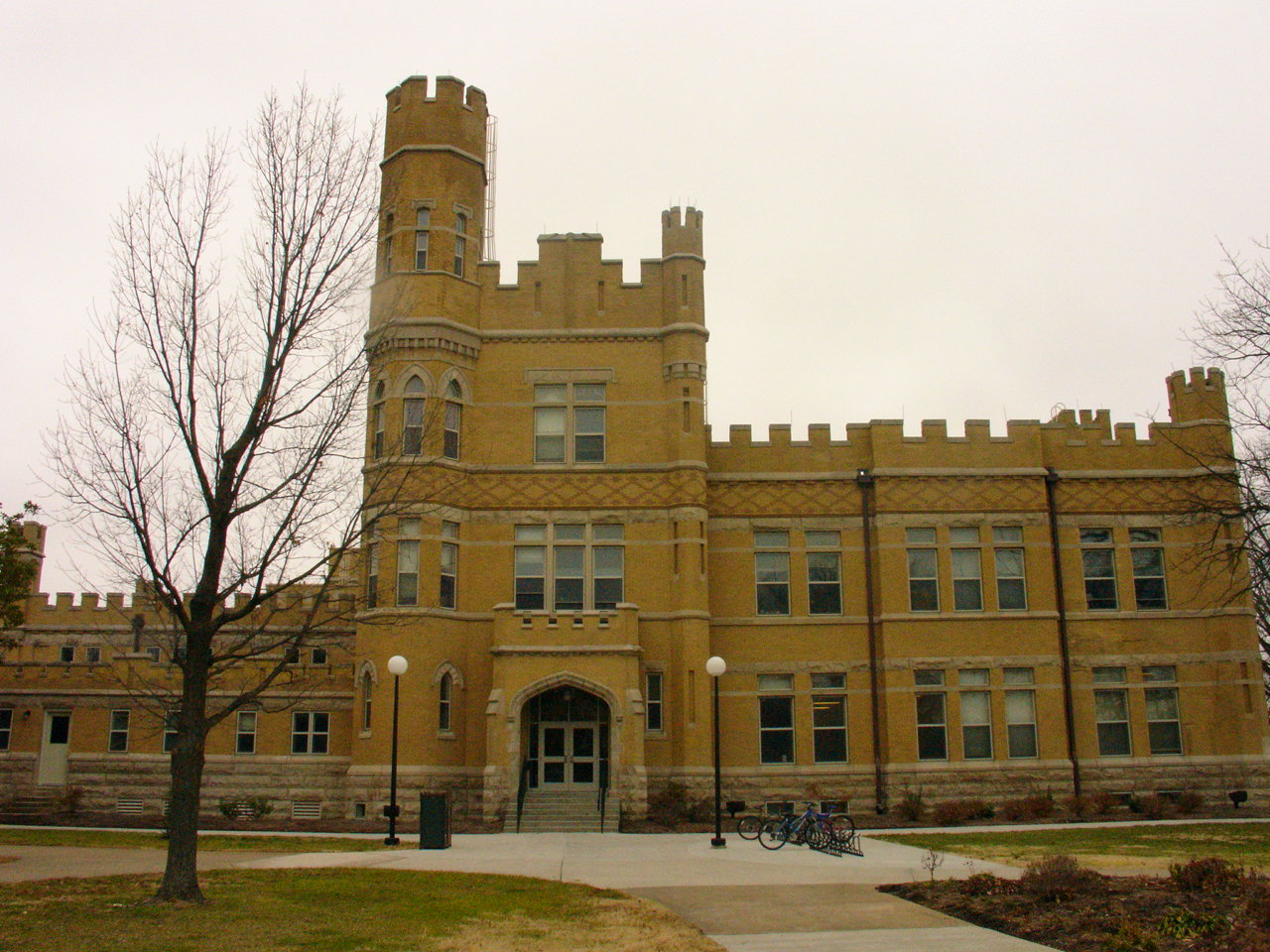
- Altgeld Hall
- Director: Eric Lenz
- Undergraduates: Yes
- Postgraduates: Yes
- Doctoral students: Yes
- Location: Carbondale, Illinois, USA
- Website: cola.siu.edu/music/

The Southern Illinois University Carbondale School of Music is the music school of Southern Illinois University Carbondale. It is housed in Altgeld Hall, the Old Baptist Foundation Building, and Shryock Auditorium.

== Available Degrees ==
- Bachelors of Music (BM)
- Bachelor of Arts (BA)
- Bachelor of Fine Arts (BFA)
- Music Minor

== Undergraduate Degrees ==
- Music Business
- Music Education
- Music Theory/Composition
- Musical Theater
- Piano Pedagogy
- Performance:
  - Keyboard
  - Instrumental
  - Voice
  - Guitar
  - Studio Jazz
- Liberal Arts, Music

== Graduate Degrees ==
The SIUC School of Music offers the Master of Music Degree in the following concentrations:

- Collaborative Piano
  - Instrumental Accompanying
  - Vocal Accompanying
- Music Education
- Music History and Literature
- Music Theory and Composition
- Opera/Musical Theater
- Performance
  - Choral Conducting
  - Guitar
  - Orchestral Instruments
  - Orchestral Conducting
  - Piano
  - Vocal
  - Wind Conducting
- Piano Pedagogy (Piano Education Arts)

== Ensembles ==
Orchestras

- Southern Illinois Symphony Orchestra
- Civic Orchestra
- Junior Orchestra

University bands

- University Wind Ensemble
- Symphonic Band
- Marching Salukis

Jazz

- Studio Jazz Orchestra
- Lab Jazz Orchestra
- Jazz Combos

Vocal ensembles

- Concert Choir
- Choral Union
- Chamber Singers

Other ensembles

- Opera / Musical Theater
- Guitar Ensemble
- Clarinet Studio
- New Music Ensemble

== Notable faculty ==
- Michael D. Hanes, percussionist and former director of bands
- Marjorie Lawrence, voice and opera professor
- Eric Mandat, clarinetist and composer

== Notable alumni ==
- Vincent Chancey, French horn player
- Sean Osborn, clarinet player
- Brent Wallarab, arranger, composer, and teacher

== Organizations ==
- Phi Mu Alpha Sinfonia (ΦΜΑ) - Epsilon Kappa chapter
- Mu Phi Epsilon (ΜΦΕ)
- Sigma Alpha Iota (ΣΑΙ) - Theta Tau chapter
- National Association for Music Education
- Music Business Association
