= John Wesley Fribley =

American politician (1906–2002)

Member of the Illinois Senate from the 40th district
- In office 1934–1952

Personal details
- Born: August 3, 1906 near Assumption, Illinois, U.S.
- Died: March 20, 2002 (aged 95) Shelbyville, Illinois, U.S.
- Party: Democratic
- Spouse: Marian Little
- Children: 2
- Education: Illinois Wesleyan University; University of Illinois
- Occupation: Politician, lawyer

John Wesley Fribley (August 3, 1906 – March 20, 2002) was an American politician and lawyer who served in the Illinois Senate from 1934 to 1952, representing the 40th district as a member of the Democratic Party.

Fribley was born on a farm near Assumption, Illinois, in 1906, and died in Shelbyville, Illinois, in 2002. He represented the 40th Senate District in the Illinois State Senate from 1934 through 1952. He had significant legislative achievements in transportation, oil and gas regulation, and mine safety. He helped investigate the Centralia mine disaster and was co-sponsor of the Illinois Mine Safety Law. He sponsored the Farm-to-Market Road Law, which constructed township roads and benefited rural towns in Central Illinois. He worked to improve the relationship between Chicago and downstate Illinois. Fribley was a downstate floor leader for former Governor Adlai E. Stevenson.

Fribley was interested in medicine and first attended Illinois Wesleyan University, where he was a member of Tau Kappa Epsilon fraternity, but later transferred to the University of Illinois to study law, achieving his degree in 1930. He was admitted to the Illinois bar, returned to Pana, Illinois, to practice law, and married Marian Little. Although his family were Republican, he became a Democrat. The Fribleys had a son, Judge Joseph L. Fribley, and a daughter, Judith Fribley. After his career in the Senate, Fribley returned to practice law in Pana with his son.

John Fribley was the first of three generations in the Fribley family to have a hole-in-one on the 7th hole at the Pana Country Club in 1971. His grandson, Scott Fribley, scored his first hole-in-one on the same hole four years later at age 16. Last but not least, John's son/Scott's father, Joseph Fribley, scored his first hole-in-one in 1992.
