= Old Main (Eastern Illinois University) =

Historic building at Eastern Illinois University, US

- U.S. National Register of Historic Places
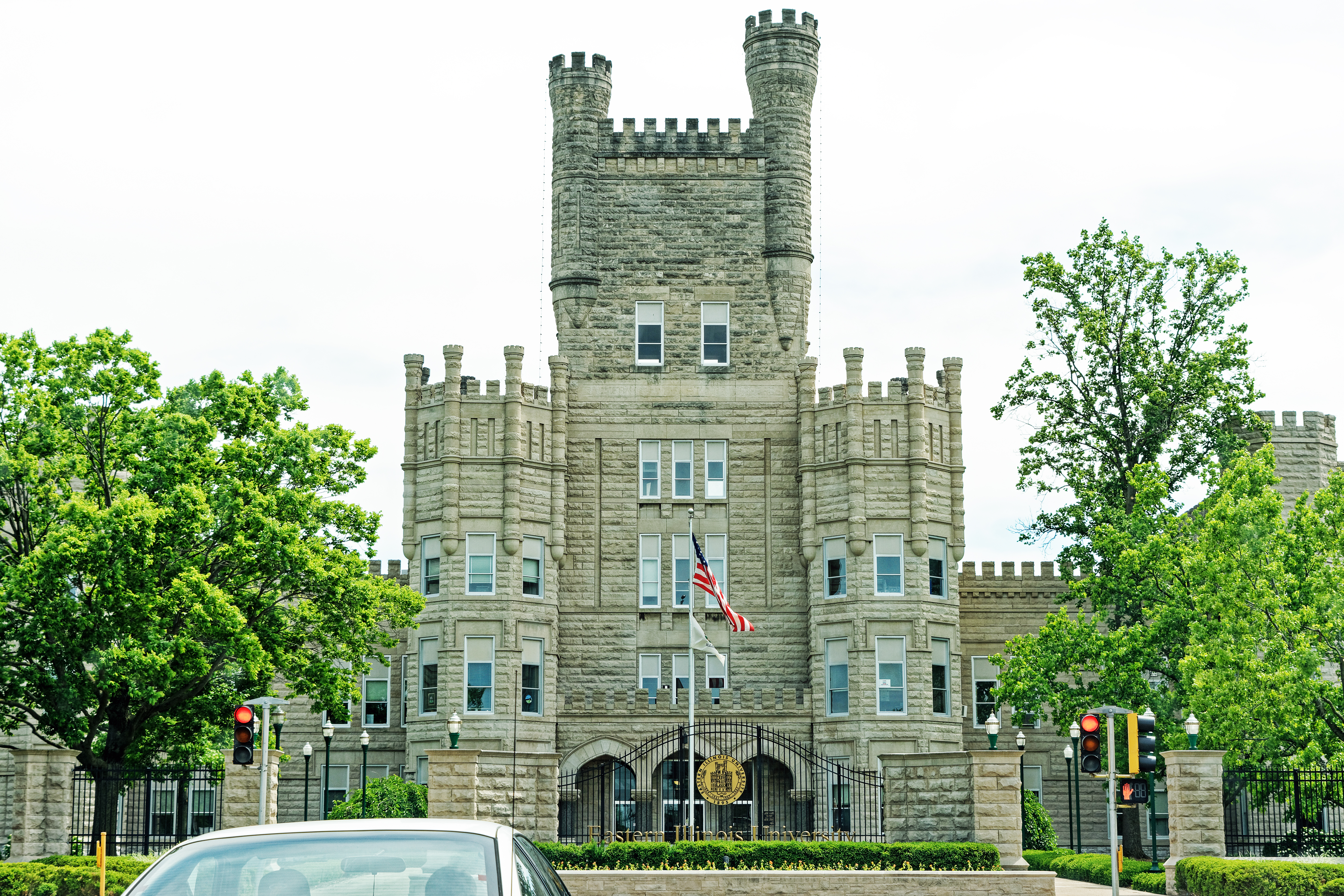

- Location within Illinois Location within the United States
- Location: Lincoln Ave. and 7th St., Charleston, Illinois
- Coordinates: 39°29′3″N 88°10′31″W
- Area: 2 acres (0.81 ha)
- Built: 1896-1899
- Built by: Briggs, Alexander
- Architect: Miller, George H.
- Architectural style: Medieval
- NRHP reference No.: 81000214
- Added to NRHP: June 16, 1981

The Old Main, also known as the Livingston C. Lord Administration Building, is the oldest building at Eastern Illinois University in Charleston, Illinois. Construction on the building began in 1896 and was completed in 1899. Architect George H. Miller designed the building, which has a medieval style resembling a castle. The building features a central tower, multiple turrets, and a crenellated roof line. It is one of five medieval buildings built at Illinois' public universities under Illinois Governor John Peter Altgeld's administrations; the buildings are collectively known as Altgeld's castles. The Old Main originally housed all of the offices and classrooms for Eastern Illinois, its library, auditorium, and gymnasium. It was the only building on campus until 1909, when Pemberton Hall opened. The building is now used mainly as an administrative building, though it still contains some classrooms.

The building was added to the National Register of Historic Places on June 16, 1981.

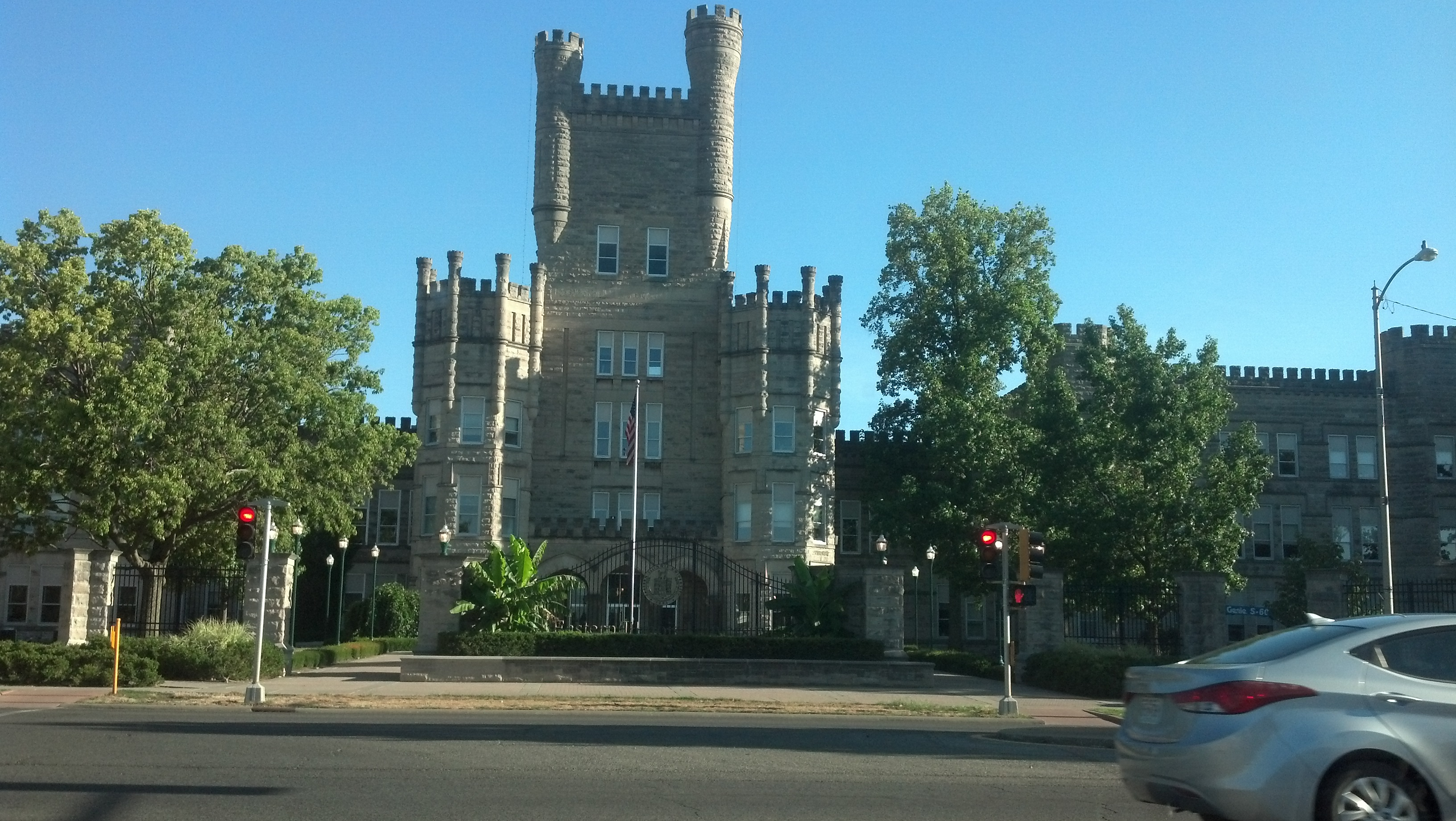
Old Main Building

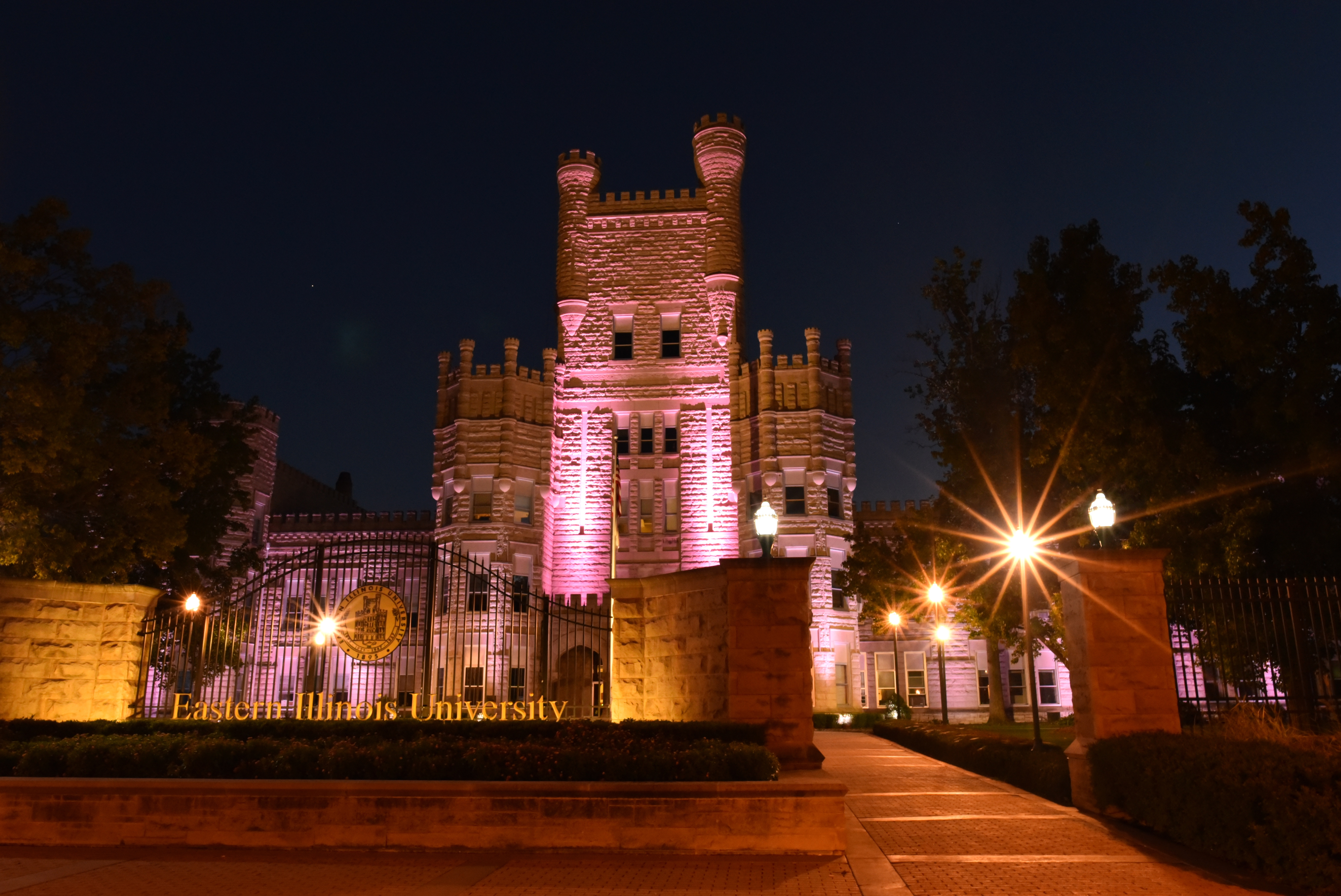
At night

== See also ==
- Altgeld's castles
