= Altgeld's castles =

Buildings in Illinois public universities

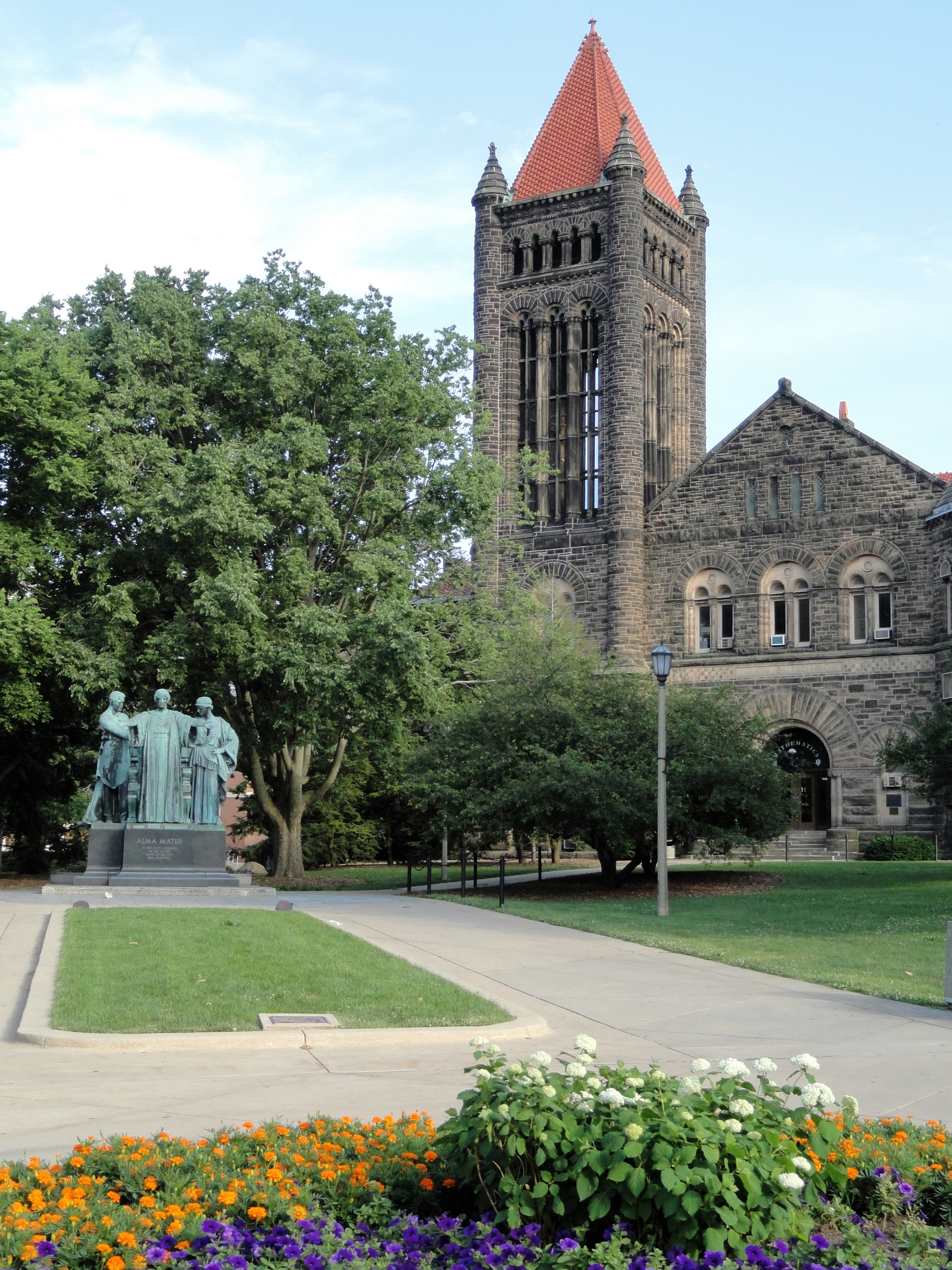
Altgeld Hall, UIUC in Urbana, Illinois

"Altgeld's castles" are buildings in the Gothic Revival style at five Illinois public universities, all built at the initiative or inspiration of Illinois Governor John Peter Altgeld During his term as governor (1893-1897), Altgeld expressed certain opinions on how buildings should be erected in the state of Illinois. In his second biennial message to the state legislature, he discussed how buildings were being constructed without consideration for their outward appearance. He stated that it was time for buildings to become more aesthetically pleasing in addition to being functional, and he suggested the "Tudor-Gothic style" as the most inexpensive way to do this. Consequently, several of the state universities in Illinois erected buildings which resembled castles in his honor. College folklore states that these buildings have aligned corridors and rooms so that they could all be "put together" to create one large building, but there is no evidence to support this rumor.

== Southern Illinois University Carbondale ==
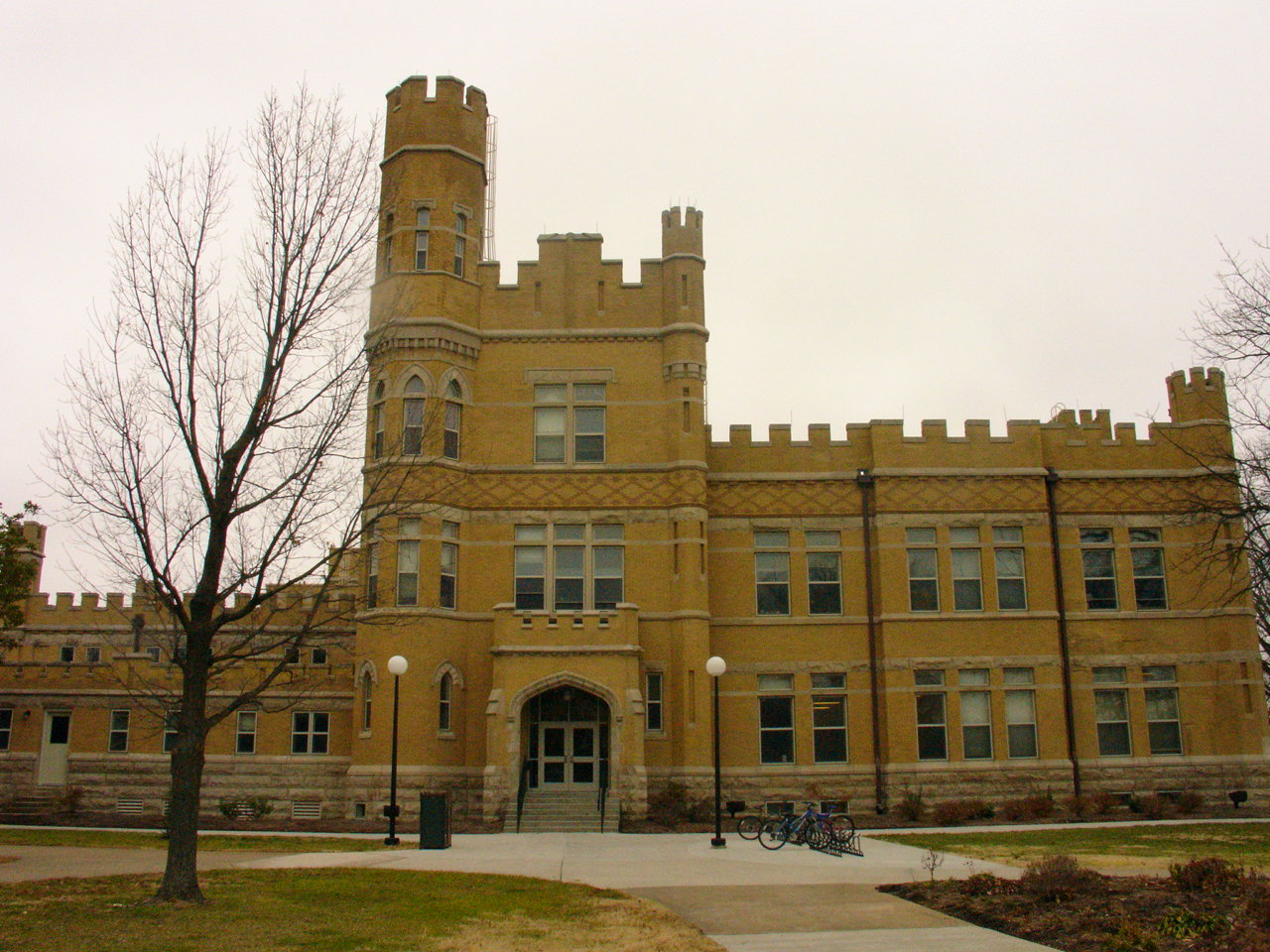
Altgeld Hall, SIUC

Altgeld Hall, built in 1896 at the cost of $40,000, is the oldest surviving building on the Southern Illinois University Carbondale campus. It originally housed the library and laboratories for the departments of physics, chemistry and biological science, and a gymnasium. Following a major remodeling project in 1958, Altgeld became the home to the School of Music, like at ISU. From 2002 until 2004, the building underwent a massive renovation, to preserve the building from the weather damage it had received.

== University of Illinois Urbana-Champaign ==
The University of Illinois Urbana-Champaign is home to Altgeld Hall, a castle-style building constructed under the order of Governor John Peter Altgeld. It was completed in 1897 by the architects Nathan Clifford Ricker and James White.

Like the building on Illinois State University's campus, the Governor wished it to be built in a Tudor-Gothic style, but due to outside pressure it was given a more Richardsonian Romanesque style. The Board of Trustees initially adopted the classical design by prominent Chicago architect Daniel Burnham. Altgeld's opposition to the classical design ultimately caused Burnham's withdrawal from the project.

Since its construction, Altgeld's building has undergone many names and purposes. Governor Altgeld had a huge interest in education and believed that the campus should have a library, so the building was originally used for this purpose. At the time of its construction the building became known as simply the University Library. In 1927, though, the Law Department decided it needed a new place on campus and it moved into University Library, renaming the building "Law Building". In 1940, the Law Building was renamed in honor of its creator, and was thereafter called Altgeld Hall. Eventually the Law Building was yet again converted into a new purpose, housing the Mathematics Department while the Law Department received a new building. Though the Mathematics Department and the Mathematics Library reside in this building, one can still see the title "Law Building" engraved on the North entrance.

== Illinois State University ==
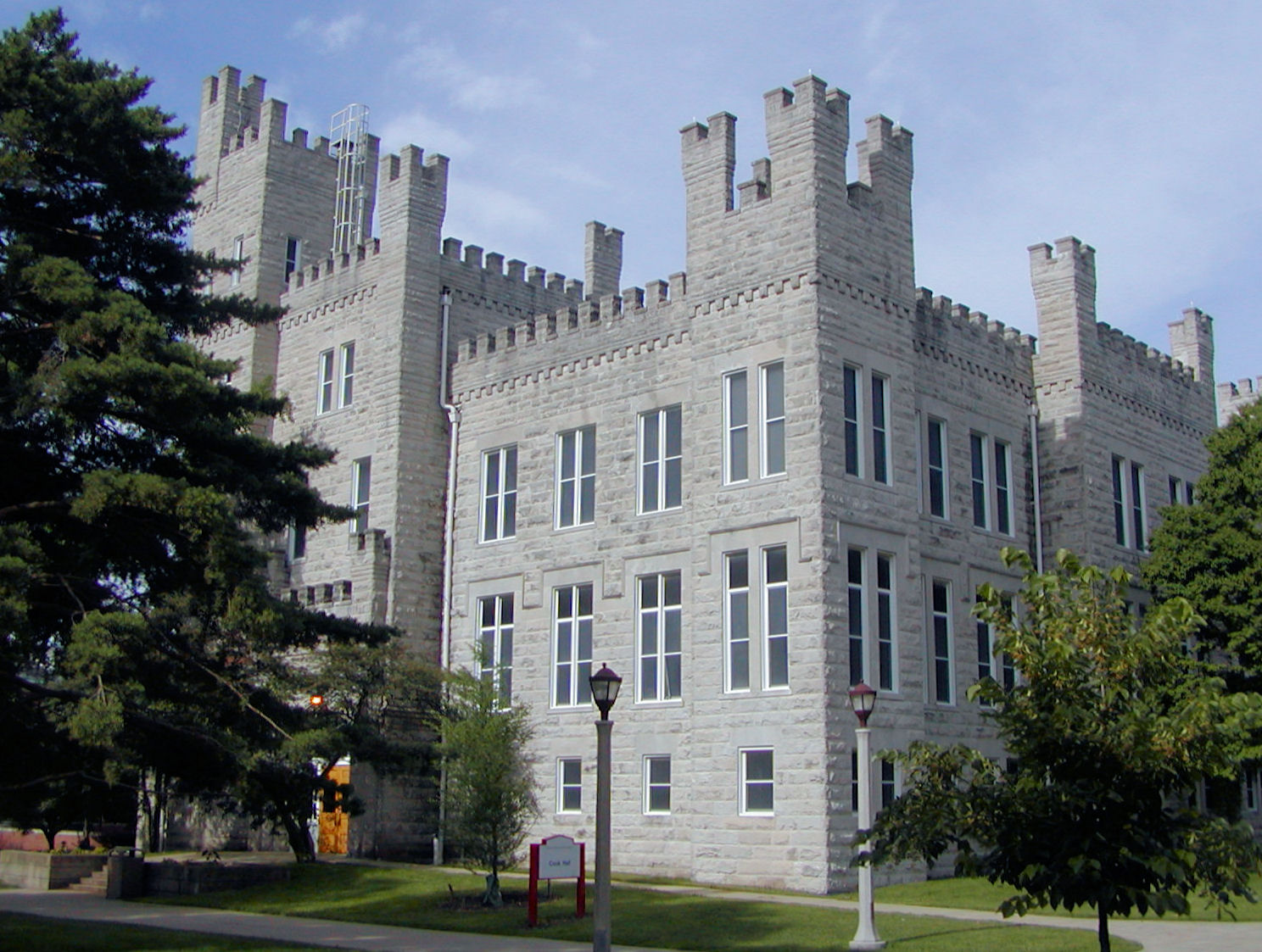
Cook Hall, ISU

On the campus of Illinois State University, Governor John Peter Altgeld ordered the construction of a castle-like building. This building, now known as John W. Cook Hall, was once known as "Altgeld’s Folly". This is because when the original plans were drawn up for the construction of the building, Governor Altgeld rejected them because he wanted a building that looked more like German castles along the Rhine river. In 1898 the building was completed by local architects, Miller & Fisher, who took some creative liberties in the castle's construction. Though the building contains turret styles with towers and battlement like Governor Altgeld wanted, the architects also added their own flair by using Bedford limestone.

In the design for the building, it was made to be fireproof, which is why the University decided to move the library into it. The building was also originally used as a gymnasium and it was stocked with all the newest exercise equipment. It had rope ladders, rings, slippery poles, parallel bars, and weights. There were also plans to add a bowling alley and swimming pool, but these plans were eventually abandoned.

After being a gymnasium for so long, the building eventually came to also house the University radio station, WGLT. More recently, though, Cook Hall has been remodeled to become the School of Music building. The building holds practice rooms, rehearsal halls, and many classrooms. Cook Hall is the only building on the Illinois State University campus that is on the National Register of Historic Places.

== Northern Illinois University ==
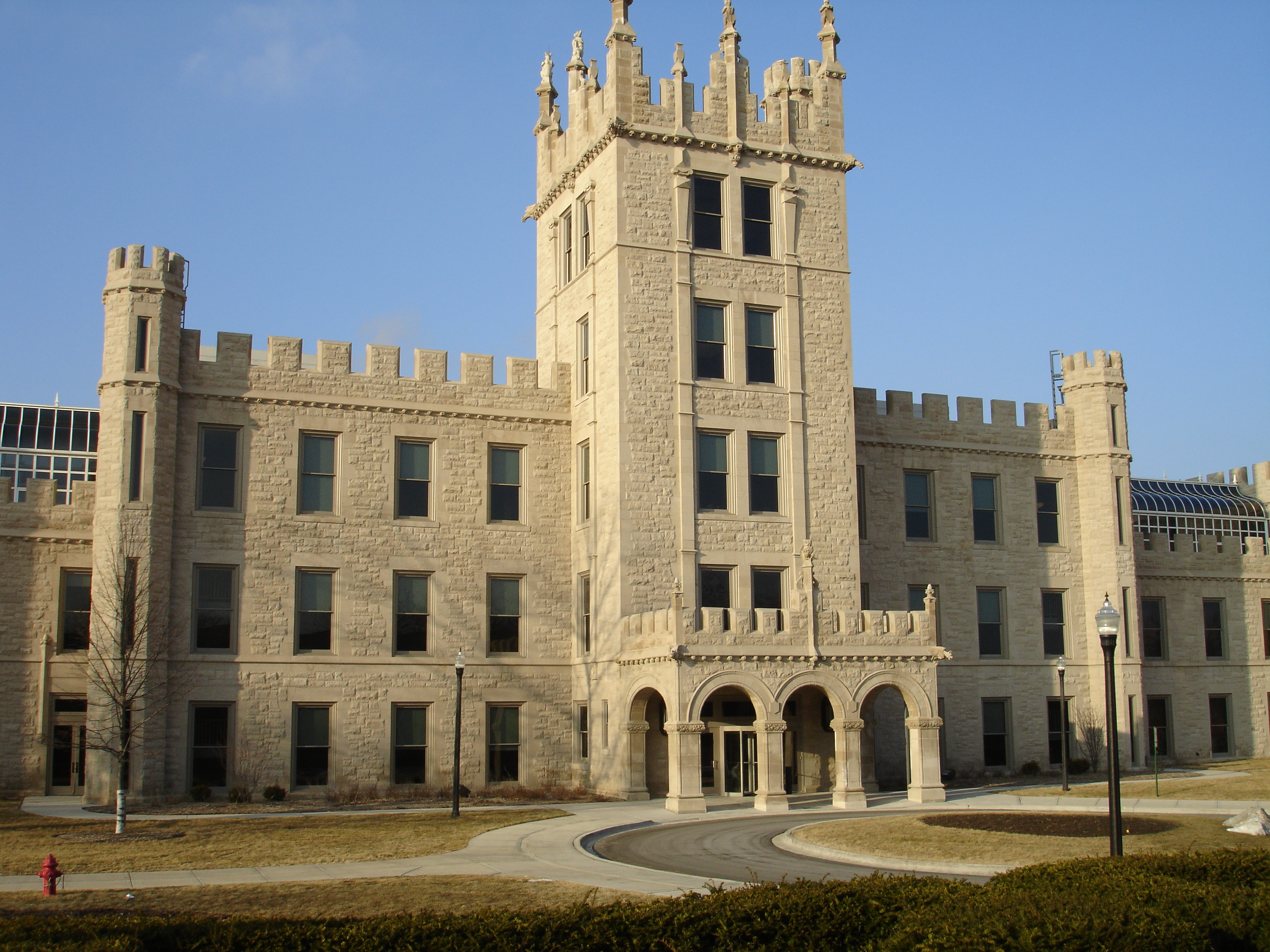
Altgeld Hall, NIU

Built between 1895 and 1899, Altgeld Hall was originally called the "Castle on the Hill". Northern Illinois University began as a teachers' college and originally was named Dekalb, and then the Northern Illinois State Normal School. The building architect was Charles E. Brush of Chicago. The general contractor was William J. McAlpine. Construction started on September 17, 1895, and was completed on September 22, 1899, at a cost of $230,000. On October 21, 1963, the Administrative Building as it was known, was changed to Altgeld Hall in honor of the late Illinois Governor John Peter Altgeld, who backed and signed the legislation creating NIU. It was built in Tudor Gothic or English-castle architecture because Governor Altgeld had an eye for architecture and wanted a stately building to unify the state normal schools. The building is among the most recognizable on the respective campus. This is a building that was meant to stand alone, which was a contrast to most college buildings of the time.

When Altgeld Hall first opened, it housed the entire university. It was classroom, boardroom, library, gymnasium, administrative office building, and lecture hall. It housed chemical and physical laboratories, executive offices, a 1,200 seat auditorium, biology labs, a study hall, a museum, classrooms, a manual training shop, an independent water system, and finally a "dynamo" for light and power.

The building also housed NIU's original library . With NIU's second library almost complete in Swen Parson Hall in 1952, ideas were being passed around among the administrators on how to move all of the books because there was no money left in the budget to pay to have them moved. President Leslie A. Holmes, the President's Panel, the Student Affairs Committee, and the Administrative Council made the final decision to have "Library Move Day" be a campus event. Holmes sent a memo out to faculty indicating they were to take roll in their classes and then lead the class over to old library in Altgeld and devote all class period to moving books to the new library in Swen Parson. The members of the Dames’ Club (now the University Women's Club) served refreshments for the book movers.

Altgeld Hall underwent a $24 million renovation project which began in 1999 and ended with the rededication on October 7, 2004. The Altgeld restoration was undertaken to rescue the university's landmark structure, which was badly deteriorated. The interior of the building was remodeled several times over the years, but major structural problems went largely unaddressed. By the 1980s, the building suffered from water seepage, cracked plaster and badly outdated electrical, plumbing and HVAC systems. The newly restored building is a point of pride on campus, both for its beauty and the sense of history it affords, according to NIU President John Peters. "The restoration of Altgeld Hall was an important step for NIU. It is a physical connection with our very roots as a university and we are proud to see the project recognized by the construction industry." said Peters. "Altgeld Hall is not a museum, but a living, working public space where the roots of American higher education are still very much in view."

Currently, Altgeld Hall houses the Office of the President, Academic and Student Affairs, Finance and Facilities, University Advancement & NIU Foundation, University Legal Services, University Council, Community and External Affairs, the NIU Art Museum, Instructional Technology Teaching Laboratory, conference rooms, the NIU Esports arena, and an auditorium with seating capacity for 500.

A time capsule was buried under the front arches on NIU's 75th Anniversary in 1974. It will be opened on the 150th anniversary in 2049.

== Eastern Illinois University ==
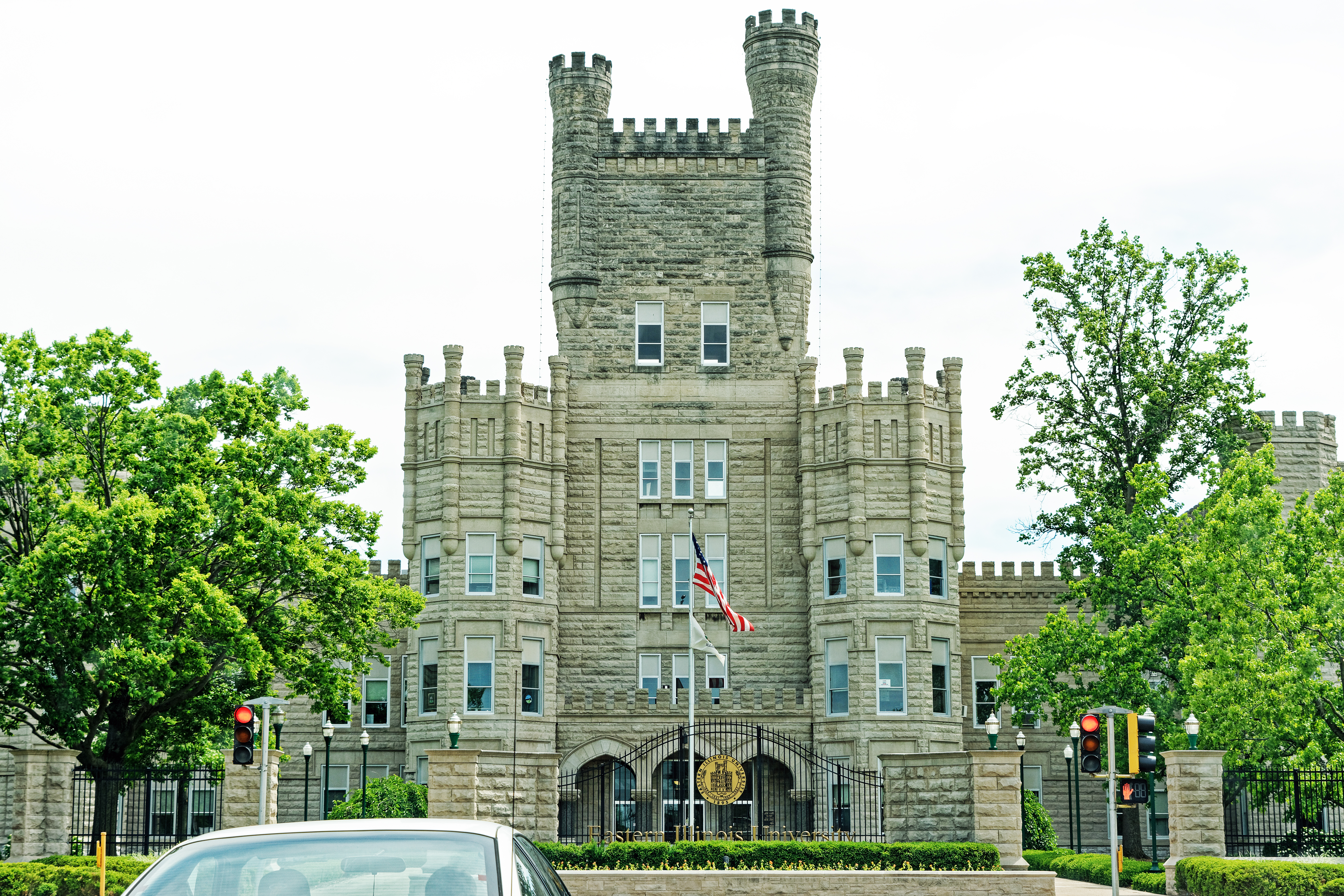
Old Main, EIU

Old Main, formally named the Livingston C. Lord Administration Building, was completed in 1899. It was the first building constructed for Eastern Illinois University, which was founded in 1895. Old Main was built with Indiana limestone with a Gothic revival style with turrets, towers, and battlements.

EIU and Illinois State are the only schools where the "castle" is not named after Altgeld.

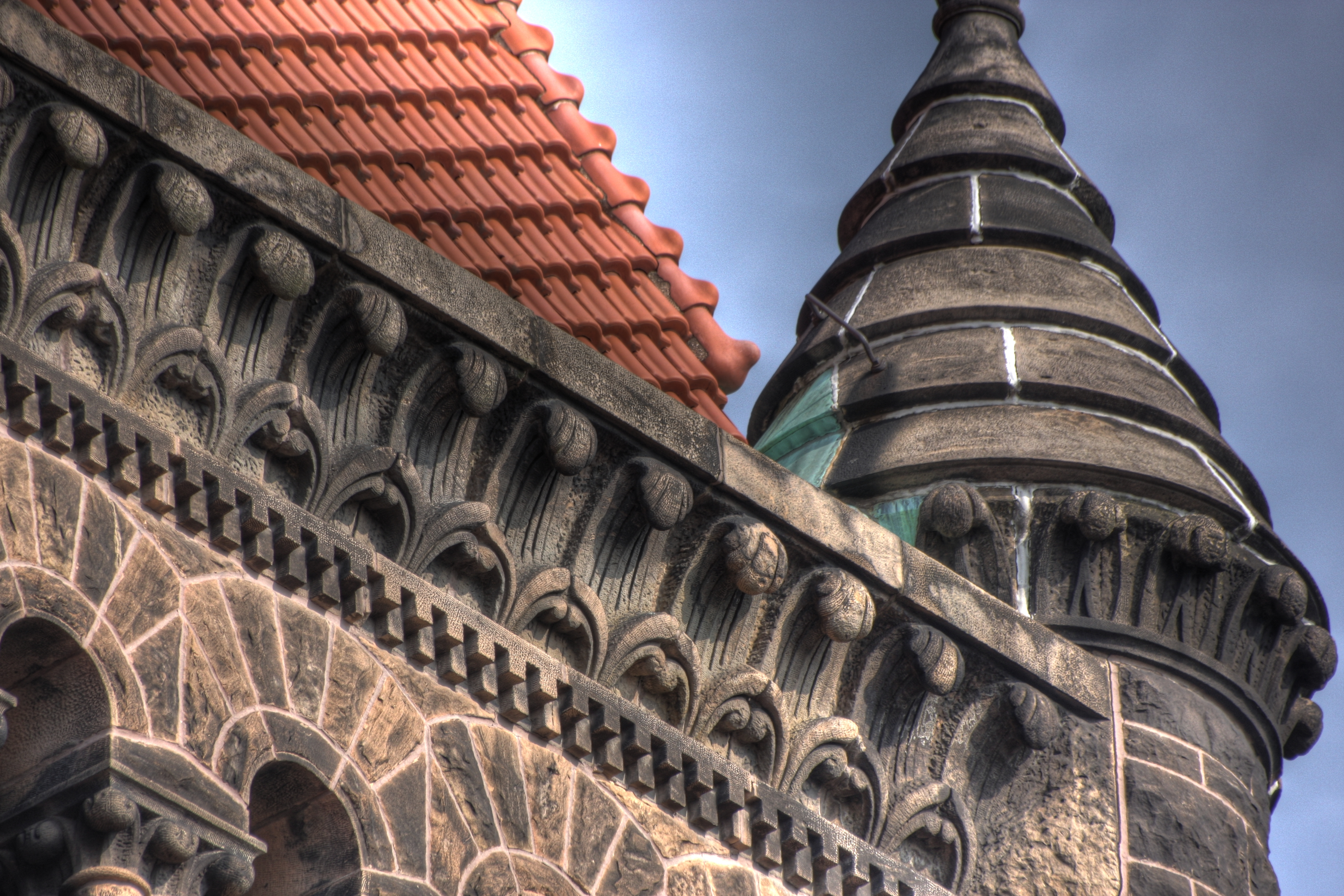
Altgeld Hall, UIUC
