= Altgeld Hall (SIUC) =

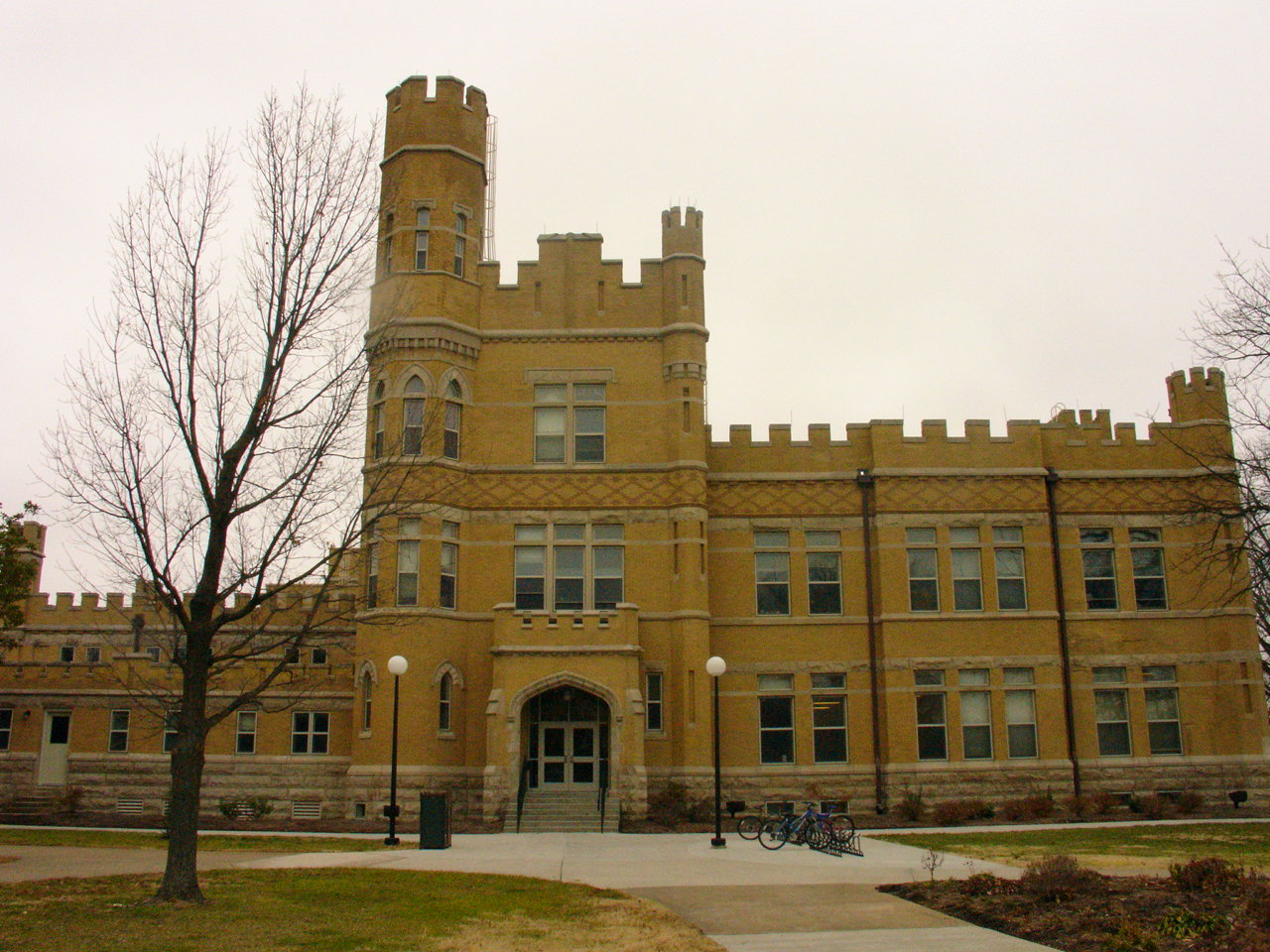
- Altgeld Hall in 2006
- Interactive map of the Altgeld Hall area
- Former names: Old Science

General information
- Type: Educational
- Location: Southern Illinois University Carbondale, 1000 South Normal Avenue; Carbondale, Illinois 62901; United States
- Coordinates: 37.7165°N 89.2179°W
- Current tenants: SIUC School of Music
- Construction started: 1896
- Owner: Southern Illinois University Carbondale

Design and construction
- Architect: C. W. Rapp
- Main contractor: M. T. Lewman & Company

Altgeld Hall is a building on the campus of Southern Illinois University Carbondale. It is the oldest currently occupied structure on the campus.

== History and architecture ==
Construction was authorized by Governor John Peter Altgeld in 1895 as part of a program of expansion of state funding for education. The architect was C. W. Rapp of Chicago, a Carbondale native, and the contractors were M. T. Lewman & Company of Louisville, Kentucky. The cornerstone was laid July 21, 1896 by Owen Scott, former United States Representative. The building was dedicated December 22, 1896 by then president of the school, Harvey W. Everest.

As originally designed, the building housed the university library and laboratories for the departments of physics, chemistry and biological science, as well as a gymnasium. Following a major remodeling project in 1958, Altgeld Hall became the home of the SIUC School of Music. From 2002 to 2004 the building underwent a major restoration and renovation project, which included a large addition to the west side. The architects of the project were White & Borgognoni of Carbondale.

Altgeld Hall is one of a group of five buildings known as Altgeld's castles. Altgeld authorized these buildings as part of increased state investment in education, but also wielded influence over their design. Four of the five, including the SIUC building, were designed in what Altgeld described as the "Tudor-Gothic style," his preferred style for public buildings built during his term of office. Through his influence these buildings were part of the larger Collegiate Gothic movement.

== Historic photos ==
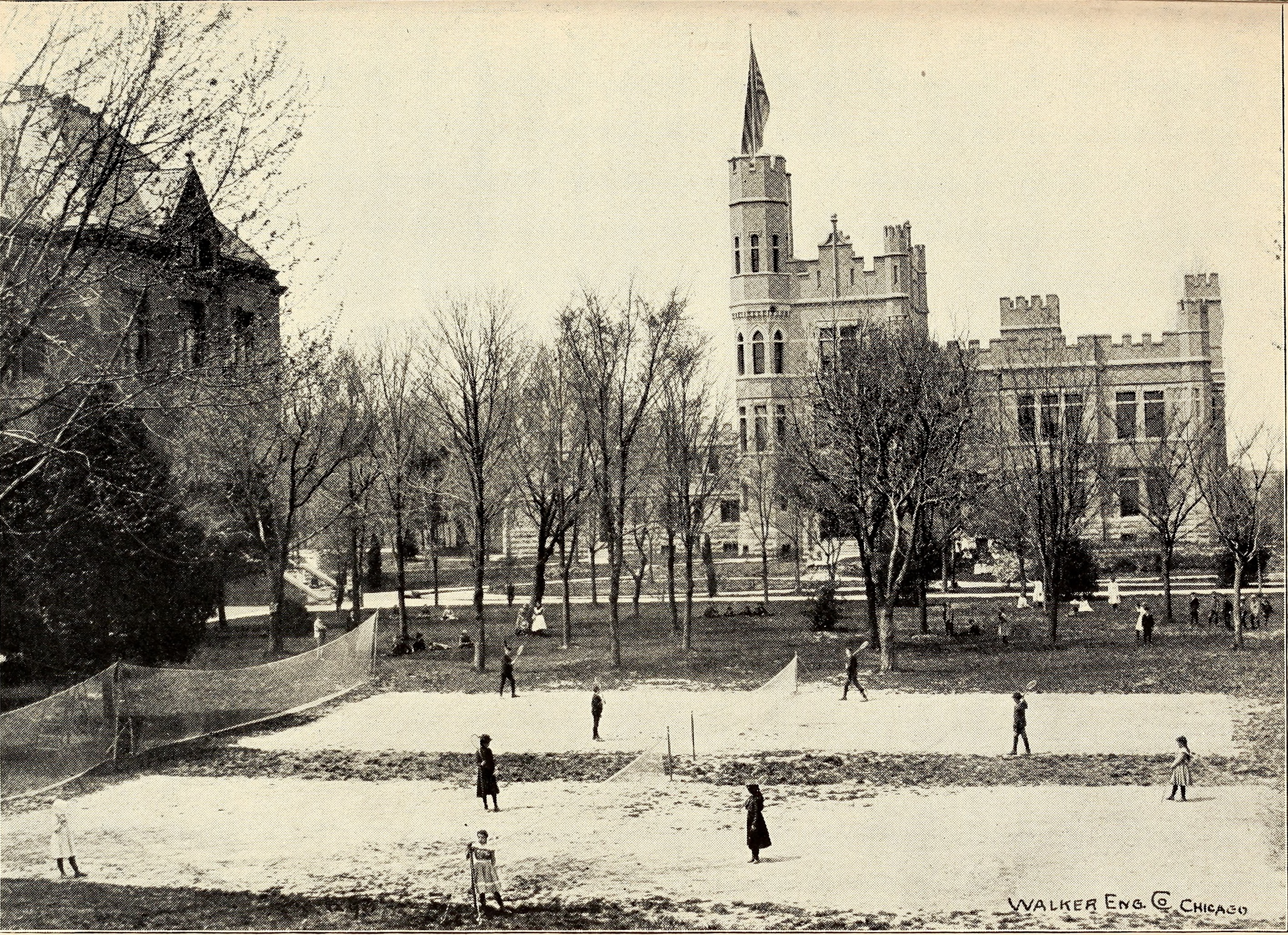
Altgeld Hall (1901)
East Side

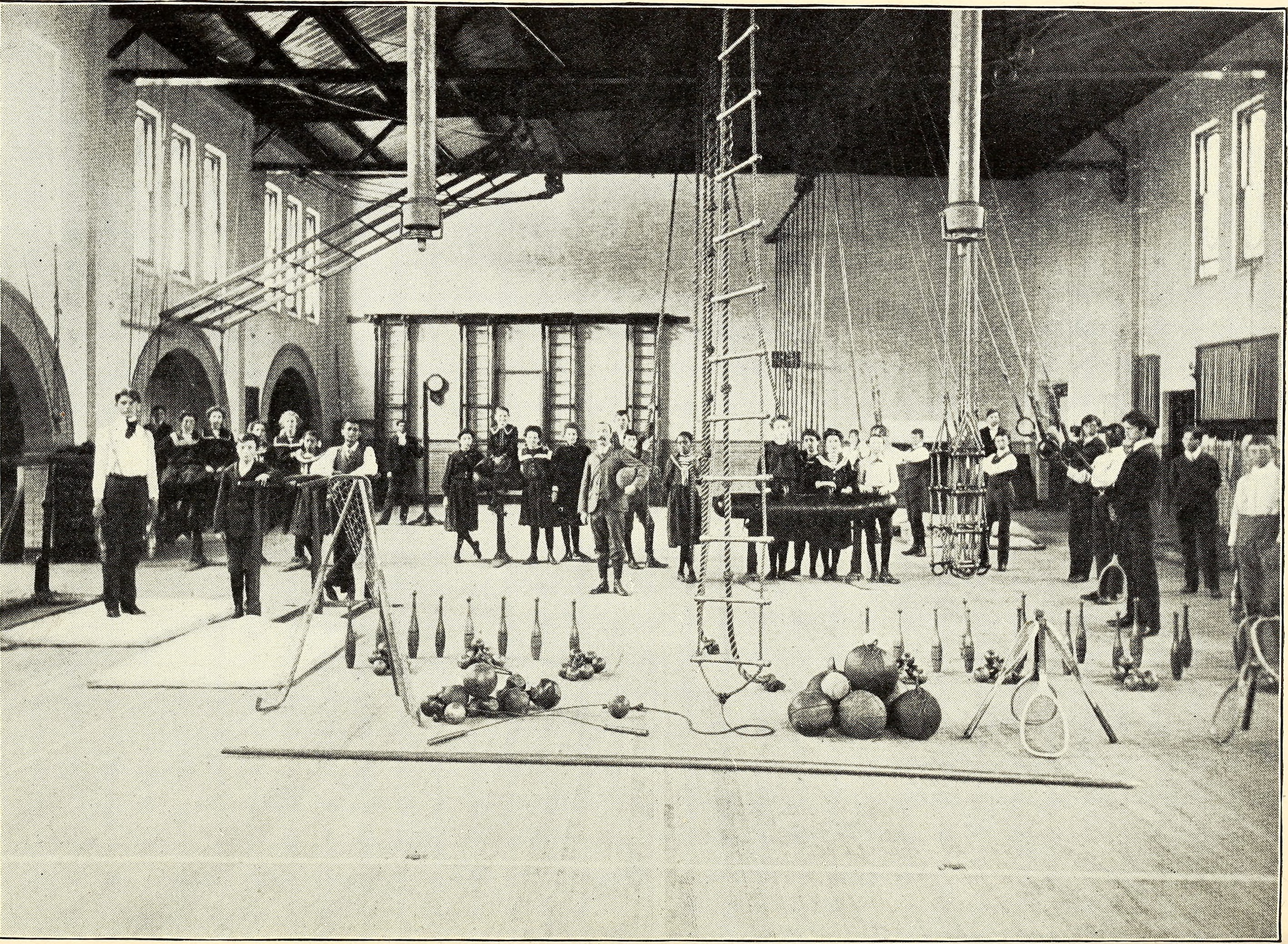
Altgeld Hall (1901)
Interior - Gymnasium

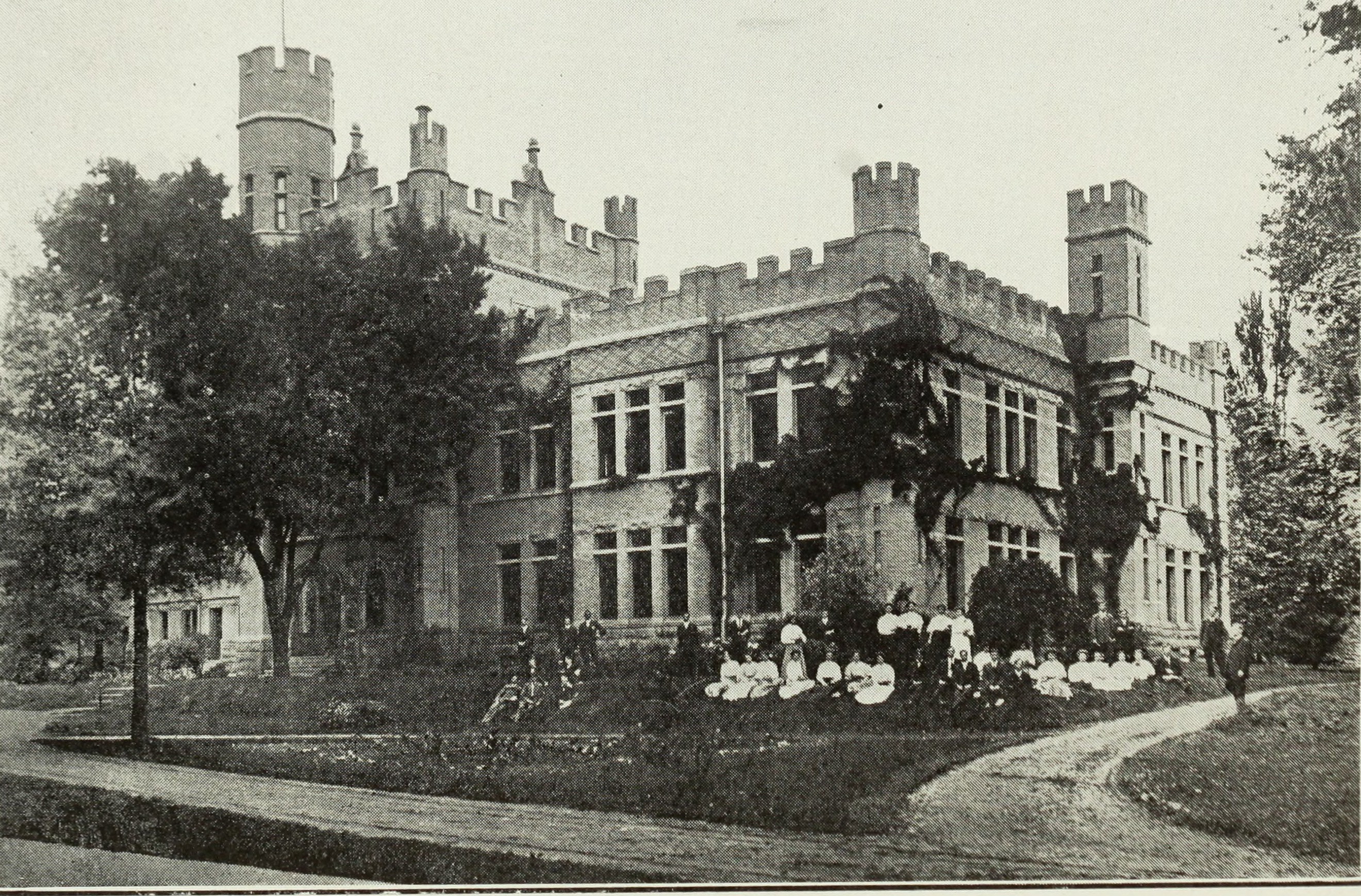
Altgeld Hall (1907)
Northeastern Side

== See also ==
- Altgeld's castles
