= Alfred Phillips House =

Historic house in Illinois, United States

- U.S. National Register of Historic Places
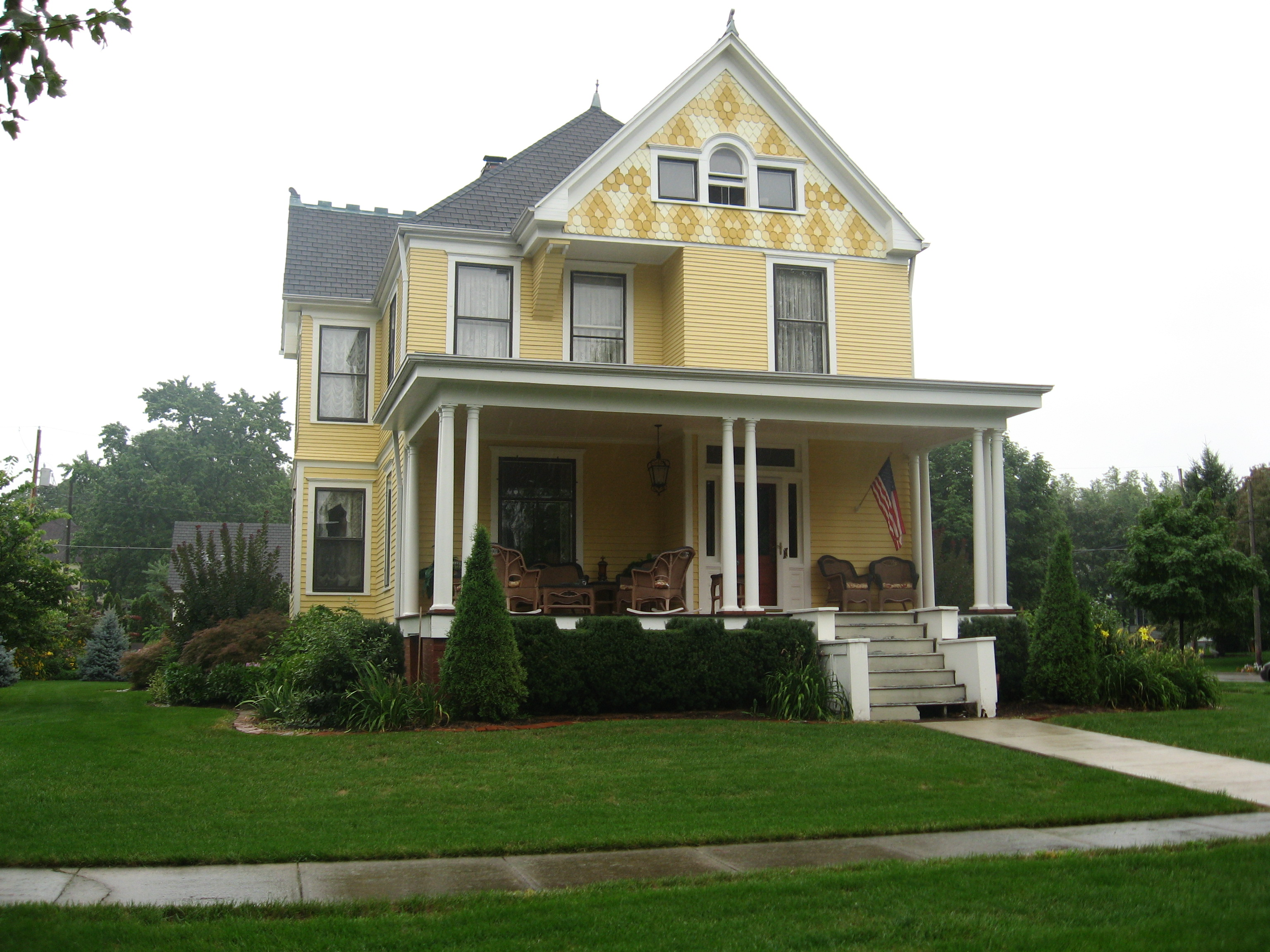
- The Alfred Phillips House in 2007

- Location within Illinois Location within the United States
- Location: 404 N. Melvin St., Gibson City, Illinois
- Coordinates: 40°27′56″N 88°22′29″W
- Area: less than one acre
- Built: 1903
- Architect: George H. Miller
- Architectural style: Queen Anne
- NRHP reference No.: 99000113
- Added to NRHP: February 5, 1999

The Alfred Phillips House is a historic house located at 404 N. Melvin St. in Gibson City, Illinois. The 1903 Queen Anne house was designed by Bloomington architect George H. Miller. The front of the house features a Classical porch supported by Doric columns, which was rebuilt in 1997. A large gable on the front facade is decorated with diamond-patterned wood shingles. The roof is composed of two hips and four cross gables, including the one in front. Alfred Phillips, the house's first owner, was a local farmer and livestock salesman.

The house was listed on the National Register of Historic Places on February 5, 1999. It is one of five sites on the National Register in Ford County and the only one in the county outside of Paxton, the county seat.
