= George H. Miller (architect, born 1856) =

American architect (1856–1927)

George H. Miller (May 7, 1856 – March 6, 1927) was an American architect who practiced in Bloomington, Illinois. Miller spent almost his entire life in Bloomington, learning the architecture trade through local firm Richter & Bunting. Miller established his own practice in 1875 and designed many of Bloomington's prominent buildings. He was also involved in civic affairs, serving as alderman and treasurer. Miller designed two of Altgeld's castles.

== Biography ==
George H. Miller was born on May 7, 1856. His parents, born in Germany, settled in Bloomington, Illinois a year before his birth. He attended public schools as a child and helped on the family farm. When he was fifteen years old, Miller started to work for Richter & Bunting, one of the few architectural firms in Bloomington at the time. In 1874, Miller studied with John T. Harris in Columbus, Ohio, then went to Chicago to work as a draftsman for Fredrick & Edward Bauman.

He returned to Bloomington in 1875 to work for businessman Henry A. Miner; Miller designed buildings in his free time. Miller's first major commission was the McLean County Jail, completed in 1880. He opened his first practice in 1885. Miller was in high demand after the Great Fire of 1900, which destroyed most of the Central Business District.

Aside from his role as an architect, Miller was active in civil affairs. He served terms as city treasurer, alderman, and chancellor of the local Knights of Pythias chapter. Miller married Rose Stautz, the daughter of a fellow alderman, in 1887. They had three children: Kenneth, Raymond, and Sallie. He received an appointment as Superintendent of U.S. Government Buildings in 1894, though the scope of the position is uncertain. Miller ran for mayor in 1895 but was defeated. Miller fell ill in 1923 and retired; he died on March 6, 1927.

== Notable works ==
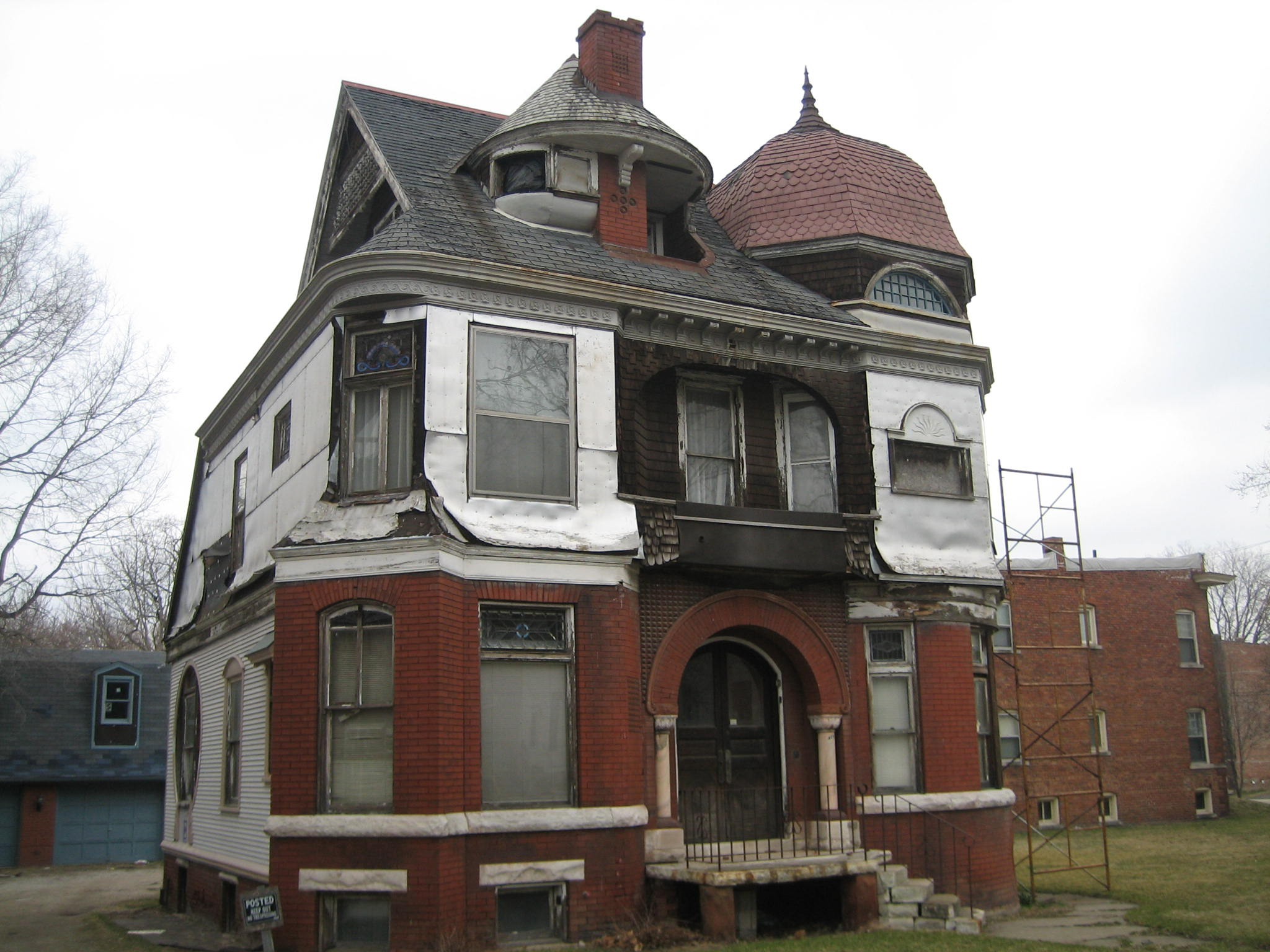
George H. Miller's own house in Bloomington

All buildings are in Bloomington unless noted otherwise

- McLean County Jail, 1880
- Elder Building, 1884
- George H. Cox House, 1886
- Jung and Kleinau Buildings, 1886
- St. Mary's Catholic Church, Bloomington, IL, 1886
- Edward B. Gridley House, 1887
- George H. Miller House, 1890
- Louis Jehle House, Pana, IL 1895
- John W. Cook Hall, Normal, IL, 1896
- Holy Trinity Church Rectory, 1896
- Old Main, Charleston, IL, 1899
- George Brand Building, 1900
- The Castle, 1898
- Corn Belt Bank Building, 1901
- Central Fire Station, 1902
- Livingston Building, 1902
- McLean County Courthouse and Square, 1903 (with Paul O. Moratz and Arthur L. Pillsbury)
- Alfred Phillips House, Gibson City, IL, 1903
- Chatterton Opera House, 1910
