= Pat Coady =

American football player (1871–1943)

- Born: July 11, 1871; Pana, Illinois, U.S.
- Died: June 18, 1943 (aged 71); Los Angeles, California, U.S.

Patrick Hoffman Coady (July 11, 1871 – June 18, 1943) was an American college football player . He was a starting quarterback at the University of Notre Dame.

Unable to sustain the momentum built up by the team's two first-ever victories in 1888–89, the Notre Dame football program took a two-year hiatus from 1890 to 1891. Pat Coady, the younger brother of Irish quarterback alums Tom and Ed Coady, was instrumental in reviving the program in 1892, recruiting a completely new squad of players, and becoming the de facto team captain.

The new team played two games in the 1892 season, destroying South Bend High School 56–0, and then rallying from a 4–6 halftime deficit to tie Hillsdale College at 10–all.

Following graduation, Coady settled in Paris, Illinois where he married Helen Hennessy on September 2, 1902. They would later relocate to Los Angeles, California where Pat would open a law practice.
