= George H. Miller House =

Historic house in Illinois, United States

- U.S. National Register of Historic Places
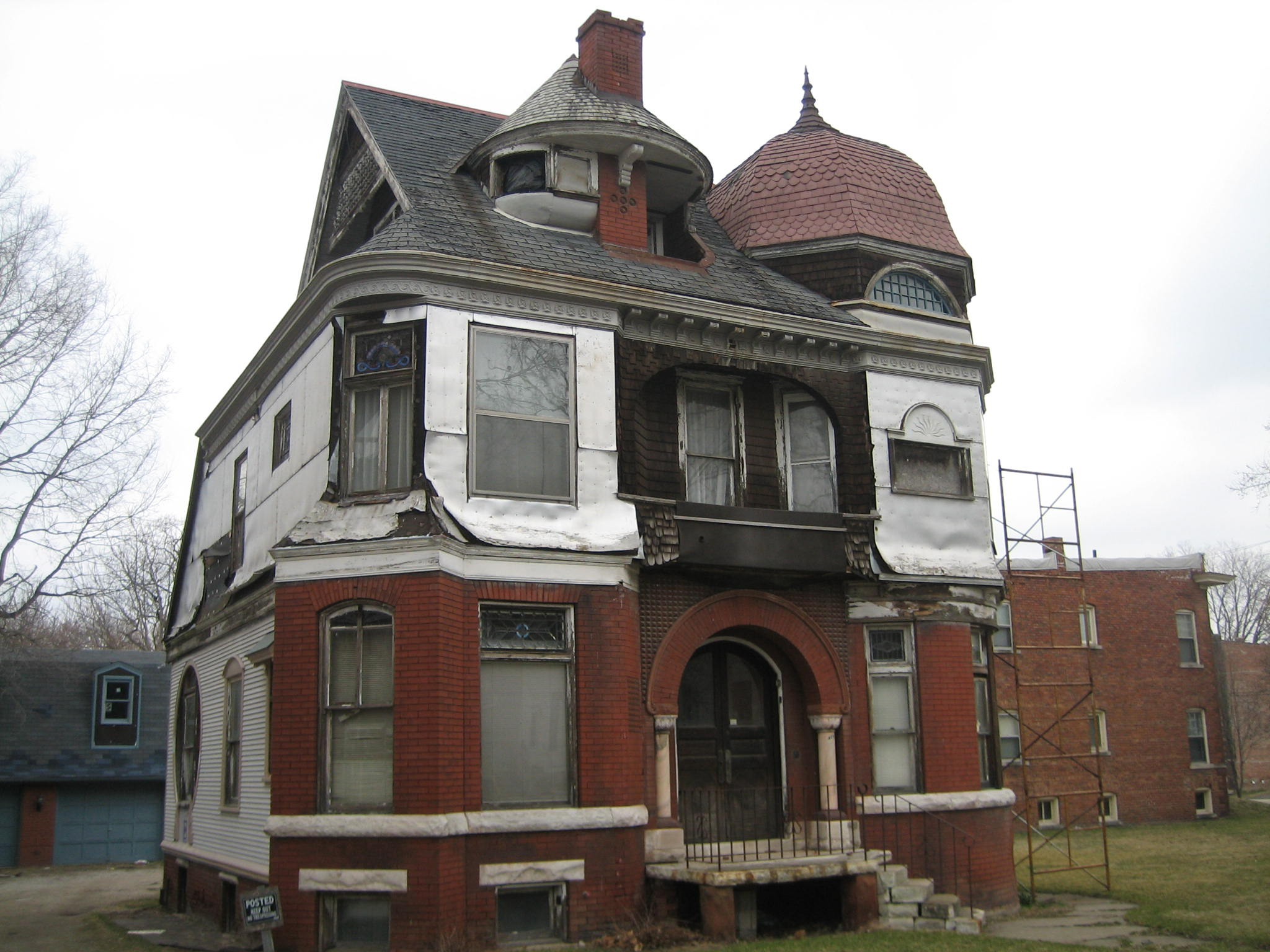

- Location within Illinois Location within the United States
- Location: 405 W. Market St., Bloomington, Illinois
- Coordinates: 40°28′39″N 88°59′1″W
- Area: less than one acre
- Built: 1890
- Architect: George H. Miller
- Architectural style: Queen Anne
- NRHP reference No.: 78003111
- Added to NRHP: July 20, 1978

The George H. Miller House is a historic house located at 405 W. Market St. in Bloomington, Illinois. Prominent local architect George H. Miller built the house in 1890 for himself and his family. Miller designed many new buildings in downtown Bloomington after a 1900 fire destroyed much of the area; he also served as Superintendent of U.S. Buildings and designed many federal buildings in the Midwest. Miller's house is an eclectic variation on the Queen Anne design. The house features a hexagonal tower on its southeast corner and a conical dormer projecting from the front of the multi-component roof. The front entrance is arched and flanked by columns; small recessed porches are located above the entrance and on the east side of the house. The house has several stained glass windows, including a window with Miller's name at the front entrance and a large circular window on the west side.

The house was added to the National Register of Historic Places on July 20, 1978.
