= John W. Cook Hall =

- U.S. National Register of Historic Places
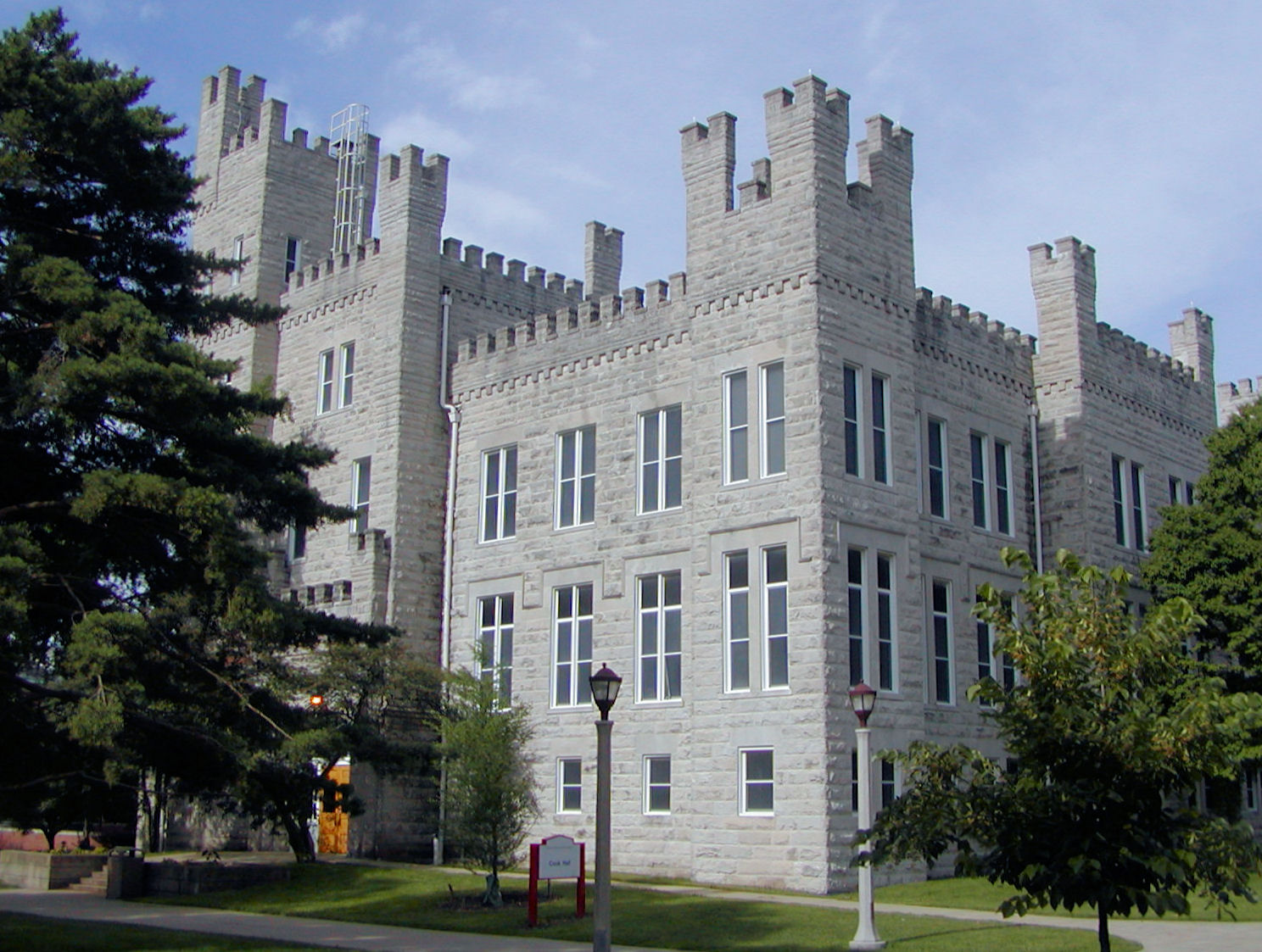
- John W. Cook Hall

- Location within Illinois Location within the United States
- Location: Illinois State University, US 51, Normal, Illinois
- Coordinates: 40°30′33″N 88°59′32.5″W
- Area: 1 acre (0.40 ha)
- Built: 1896
- Architect: George H. Miller
- NRHP reference No.: 86000268
- Added to NRHP: February 20, 1986

John W. Cook Hall, or Cook Hall, is a building that resembles a castle on the Quad of Illinois State University in Normal, Illinois. Cook Hall, named for the university's fourth president, has been listed on the National Register of Historic Places since the winter of 1986.

Cook Hall is one of "Altgeld's castles": it was designed toward the end of the administration of Illinois Governor John Peter Altgeld. Altgeld supported new facilities for Illinois universities and was a German native who favored Gothic Revival architecture.

First proposed as a dormitory by Richard Edwards during his presidency at Illinois State University, the building was not approved until 1895. Opened in 1897, design elements for the building were changed, and its overall purpose shifted to that of a gymnasium. The building, called "Gymnasium" also held the University Library. Renamed "John Cook Hall" in 1936, it was eventually converted for other uses as larger gyms were constructed on campus. It currently houses the School of Music.

== See also ==
- Altgeld's castles
- John W. Cook
