= Louis Jehle House =

Historic house in Illinois, United States

- U.S. National Register of Historic Places
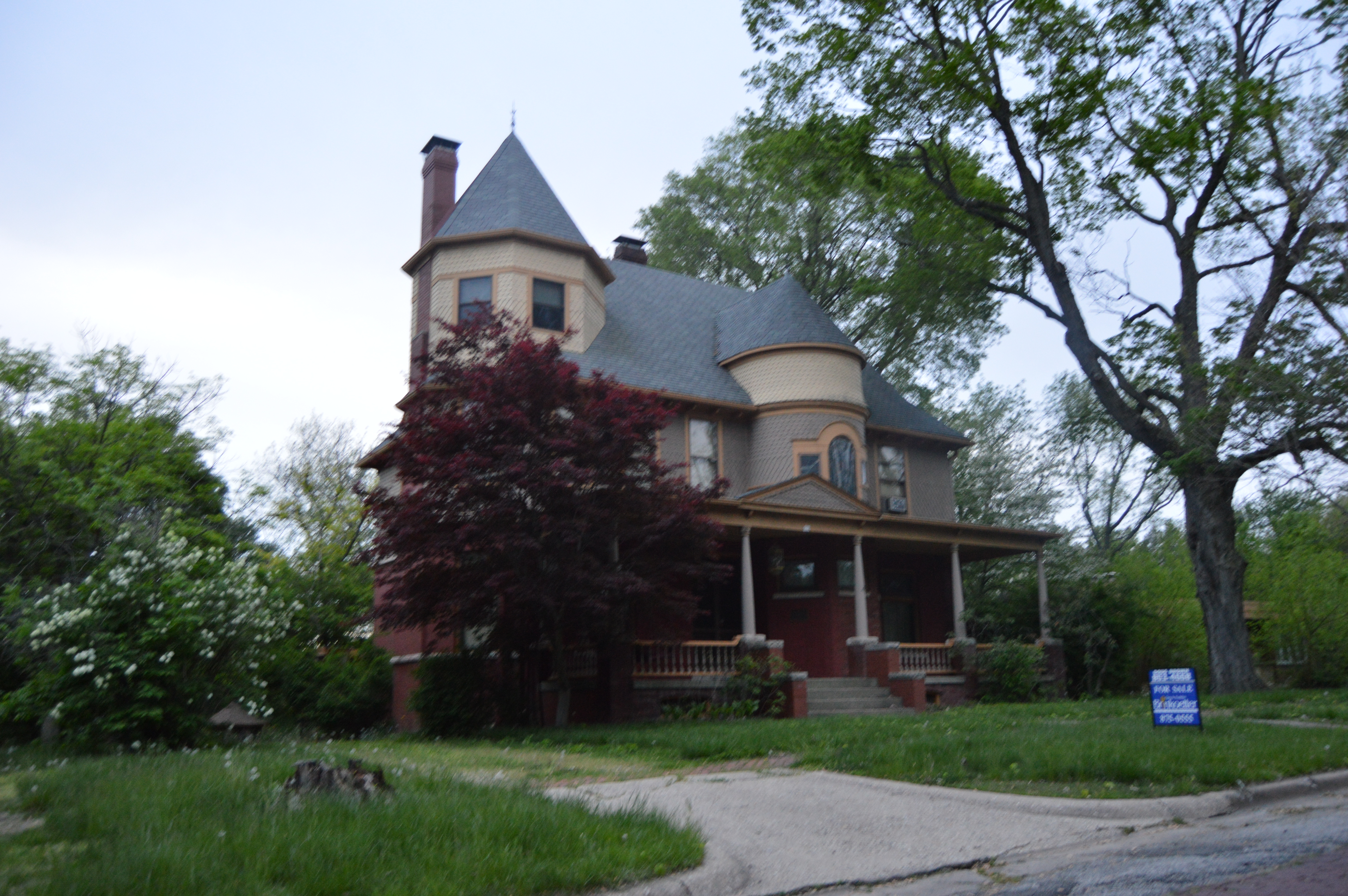

- Location within Illinois Location within the United States
- Location: 511 E. Fifth St., Pana, Illinois
- Coordinates: 39°23′3″N 89°4′33″W
- Area: less than one acre
- Built by: Lyman and Jordan
- Architect: Miller, George H.
- Architectural style: Queen Anne
- NRHP reference No.: 95000490
- Added to NRHP: April 20, 1995

The Louis Jehle House is a historic house located at 511 E. Fifth St. in Pana, Illinois. The house was built in 1895 for local businessman Louis Jehle. Prominent Bloomington architect George H. Miller designed the Queen Anne house; it is Miller's only design in Pana. A round tower with a Palladian window rises above the house's front entrance, which is located in a full-length porch. A second, octagonal tower extends above the roof line on the east side of the house. The second story and both towers are sided with patterned shingles. The house has a multi-component roof with a main gabled section and a cross gable in the back.

The Queen Anne features eleven stained glass windows and several jeweled stained glass doors. It is the only home in Christian County that is on the National Register of Historic Places.

In addition, the home has three fireplaces adorned with mirrors and hand carved mantels. The hardwood floors throughout reflect various patterns inlaid with different hard woods.

The house was added to the National Register of Historic Places on April 20, 1995.

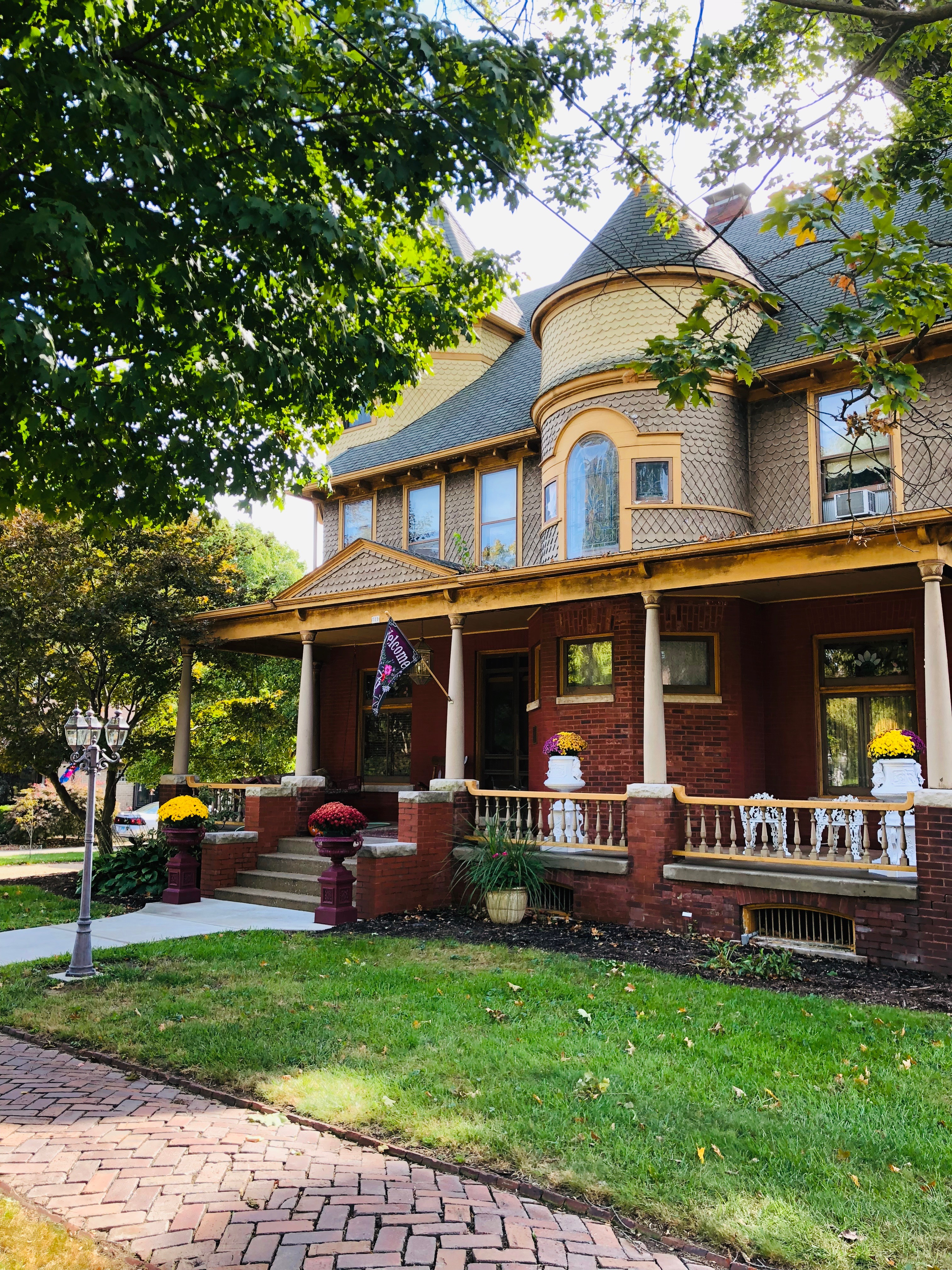
Louis Jehle's Queen Anne House Back Yard 05

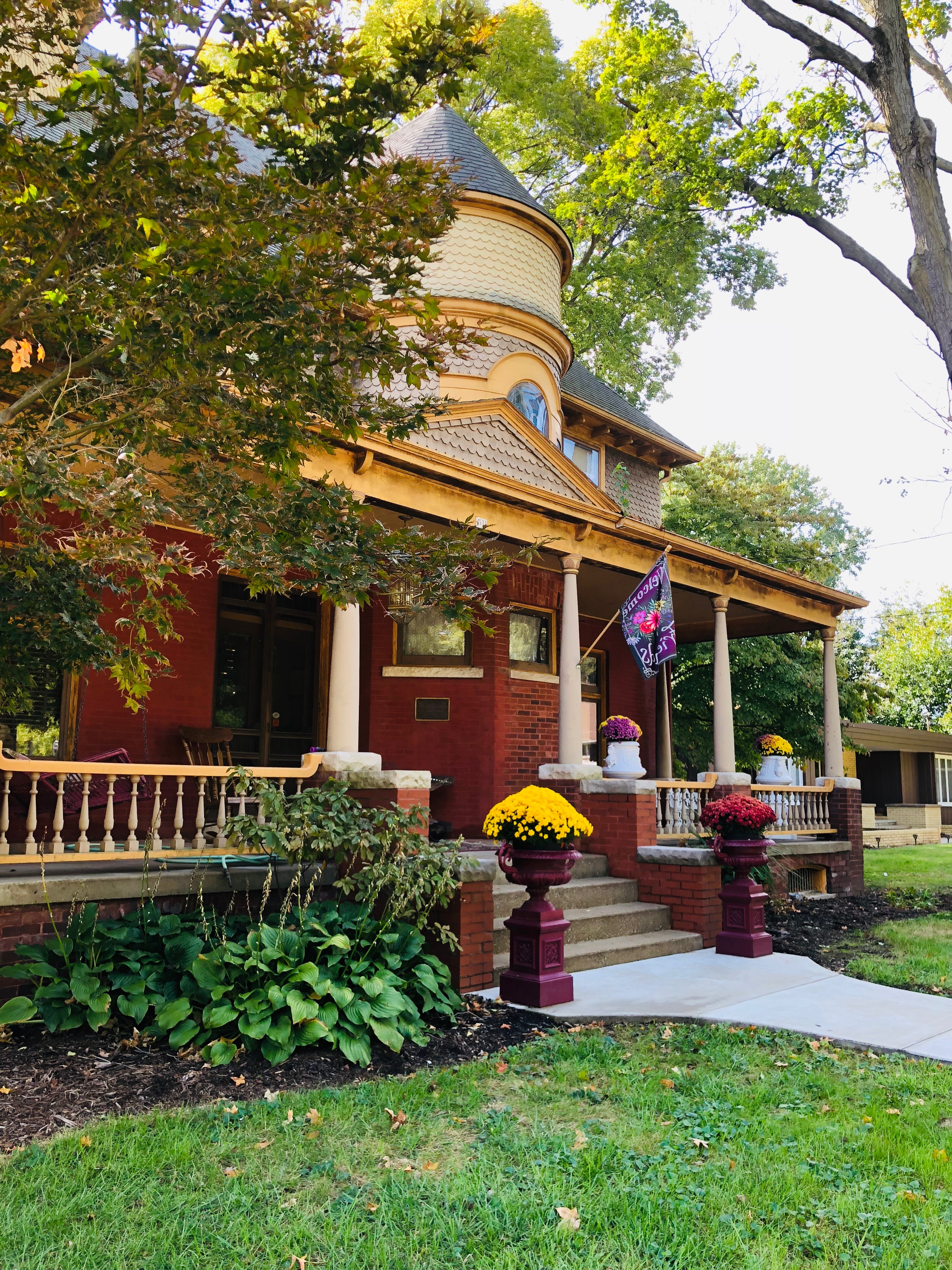
Louis Jehle's Queen Anne House Back Yard 04

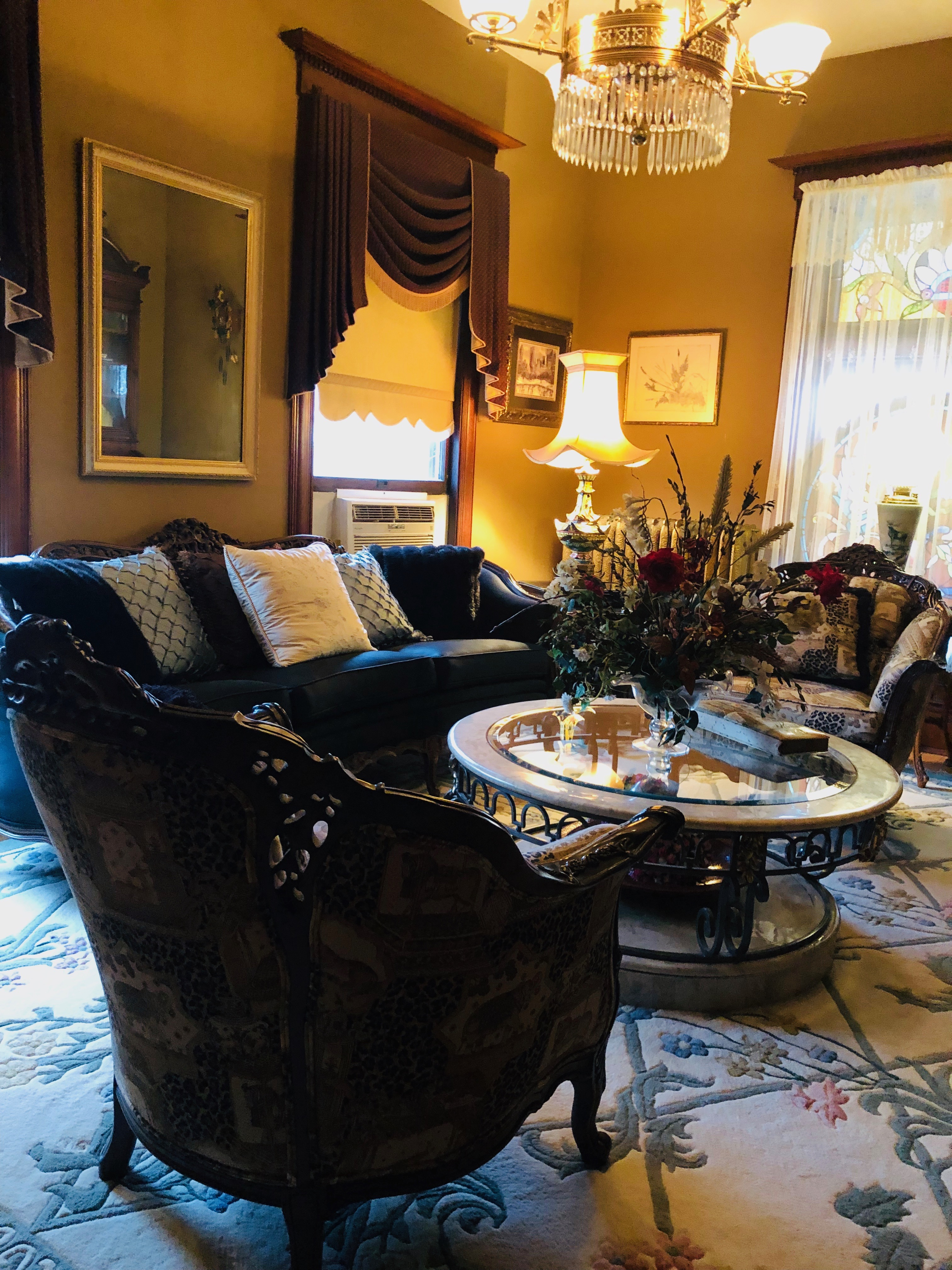
Louis Jehle's Queen Anne House Back Yard 06

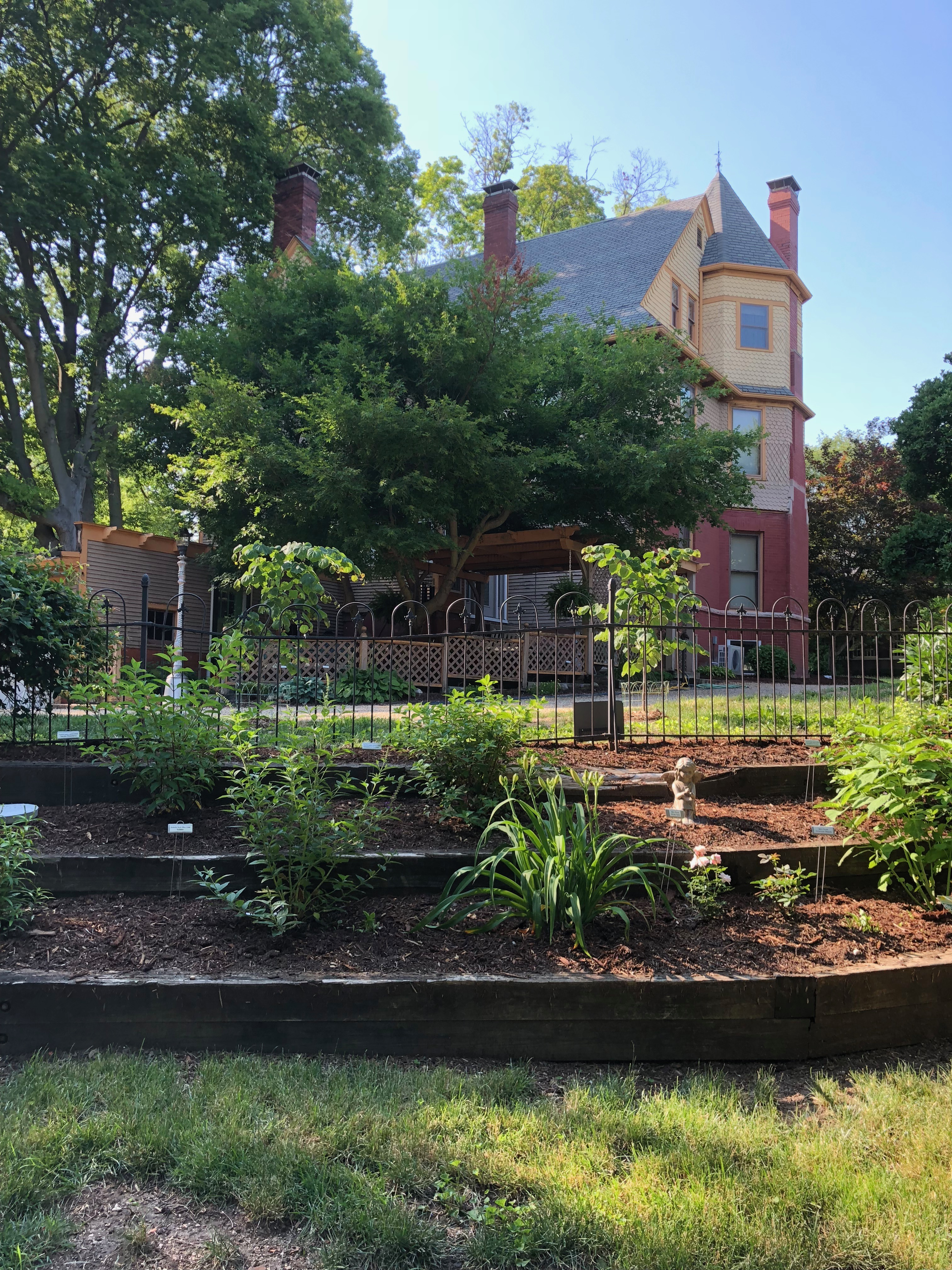
Louis Jehle's Queen Anne House Back Yard 07

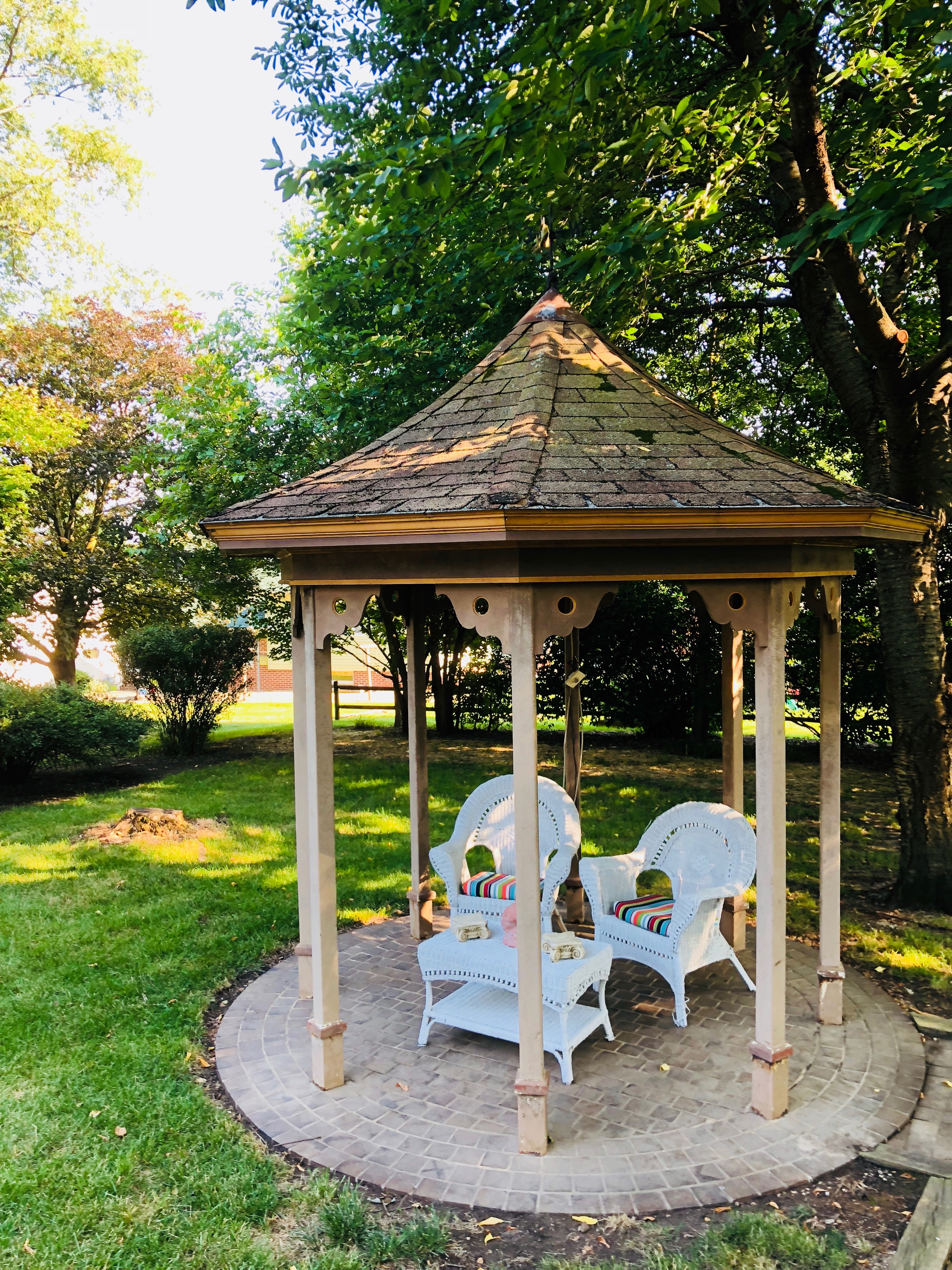
Louis Jehle's Queen Anne House Back Yard 03

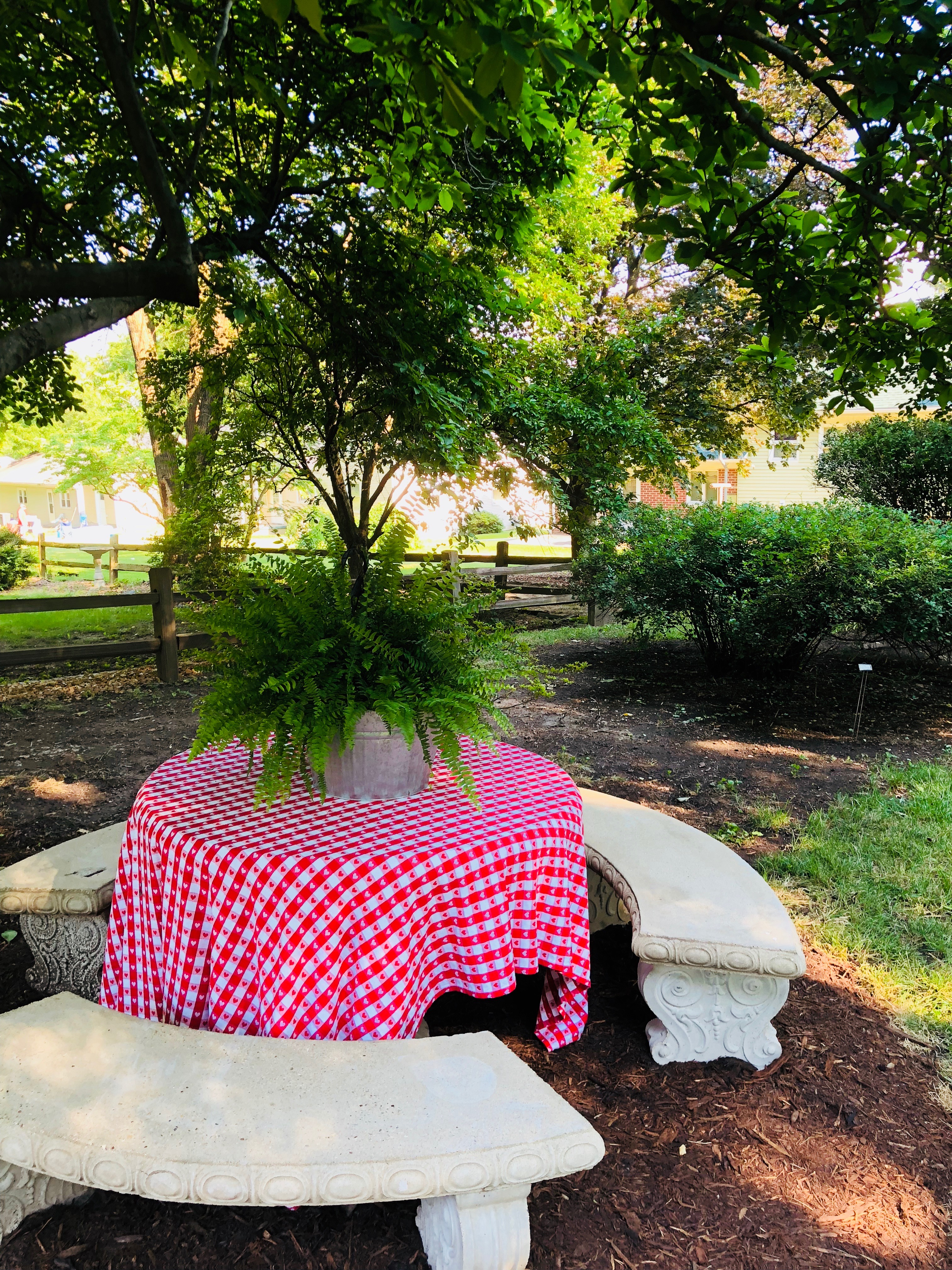
Louis Jehle's Queen Anne House Back Yard 02

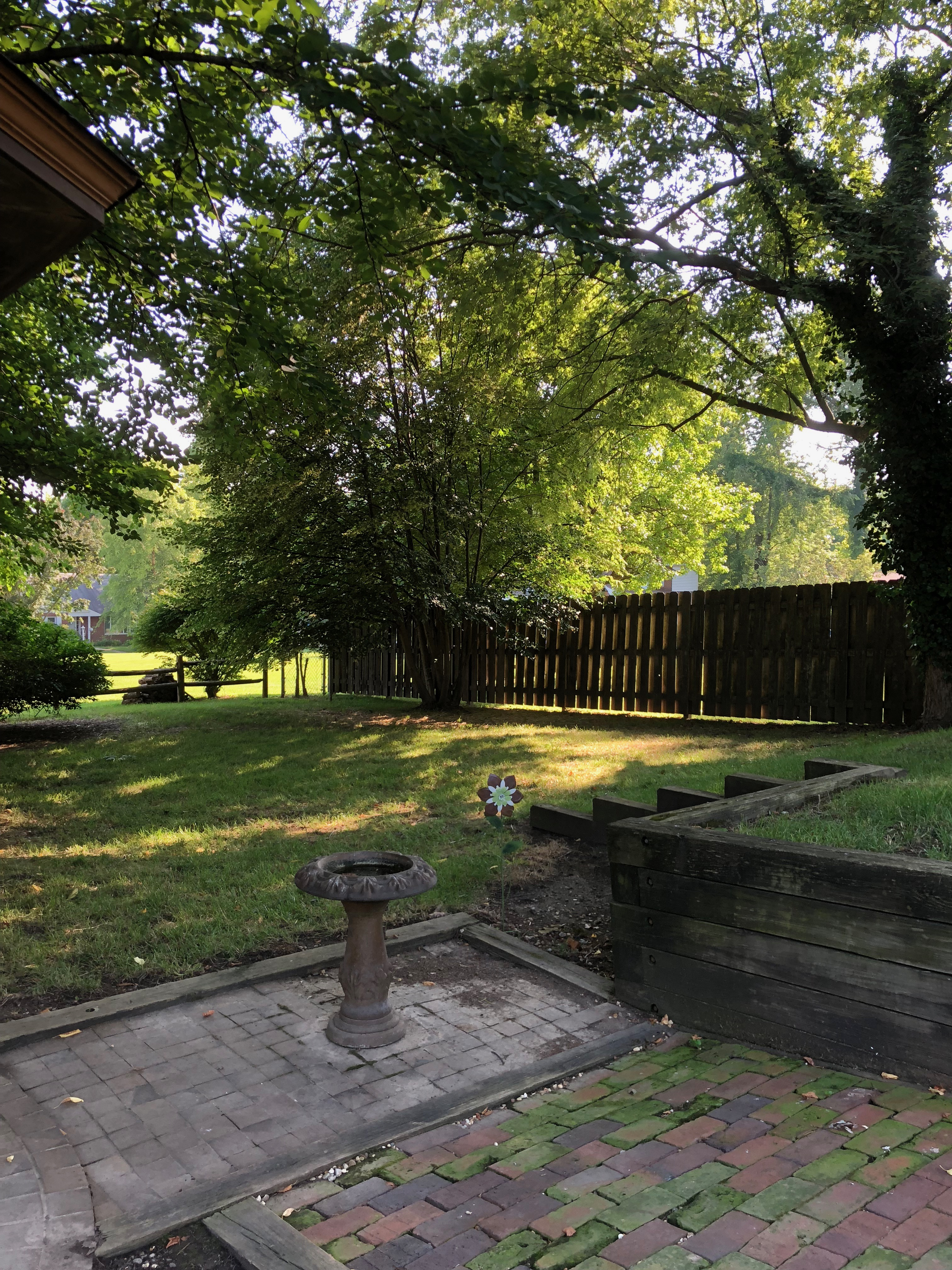
Louis Jehle's Queen Anne House Back Yard 01
