= Pana, Illinois =

Pana
- Town
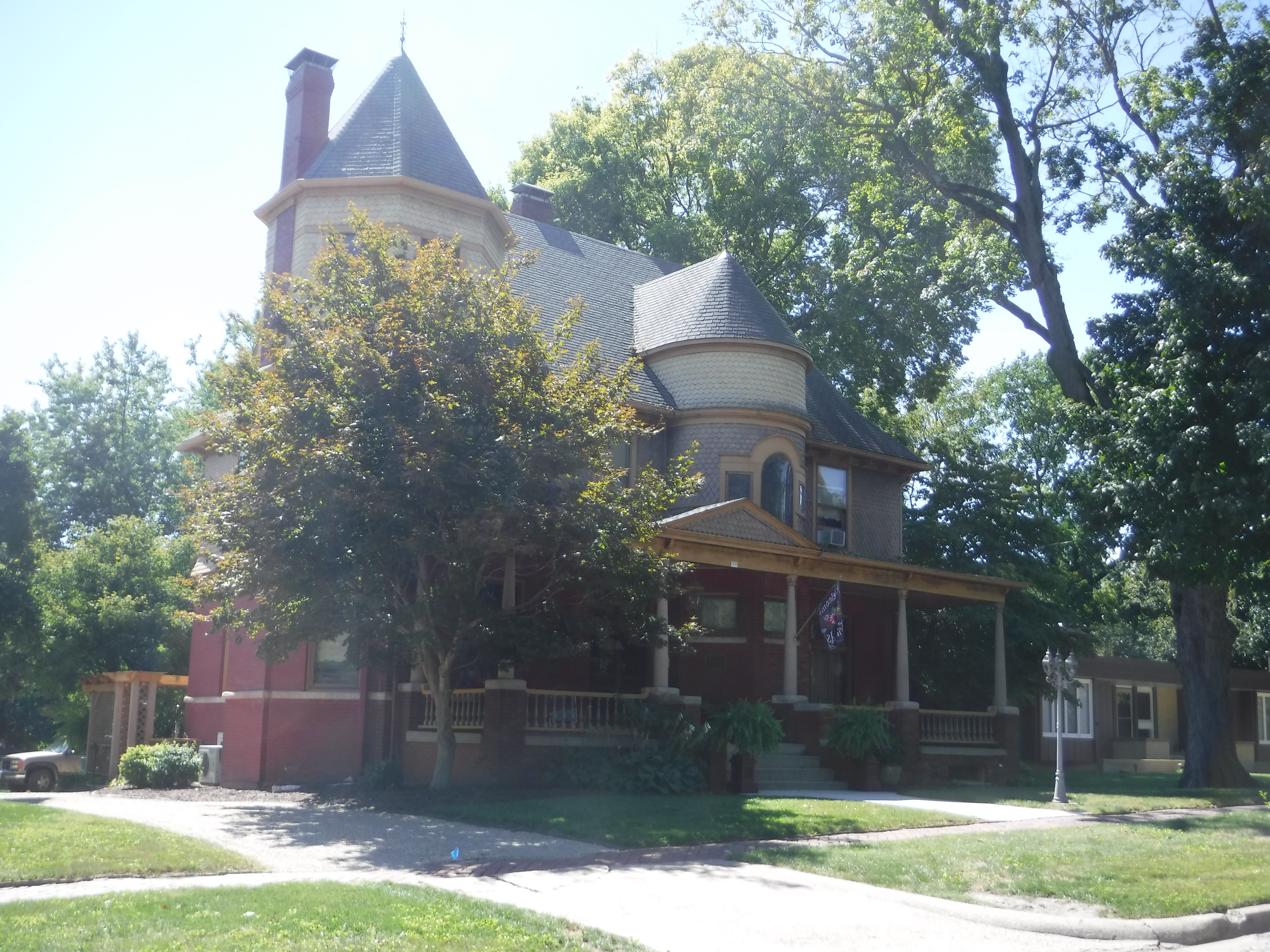
- Louis Jehle House in Pana
- Nickname: City of Roses
- Location of Pana in Christian County, Illinois.
- Coordinates: 39°23′05″N 89°03′51″W
- Country: United States
- State: Illinois
- County: Christian, Shelby

Area
  - Total: 4.16 sq mi (10.78 km^{2})
  - Land: 3.86 sq mi (9.99 km^{2})
  - Water: 0.31 sq mi (0.80 km^{2})
- Elevation: 679 ft (207 m)

Population (2020)
  - Total: 5,199
  - Density: 1,348.3/sq mi (520.59/km^{2})
- Time zone: UTC−6 (CST)
  - Summer (DST): UTC−5 (CDT)
- ZIP code: 62557
- Area code: 217
- FIPS code: 17-57472
- GNIS ID: 2396135
- Website: www.cityofpana.org

Pana /ˈpeɪnə/ is a small town in Christian County, Illinois, United States. A small portion is in Shelby County. The population was 5,199 at the 2020 census.

== History ==
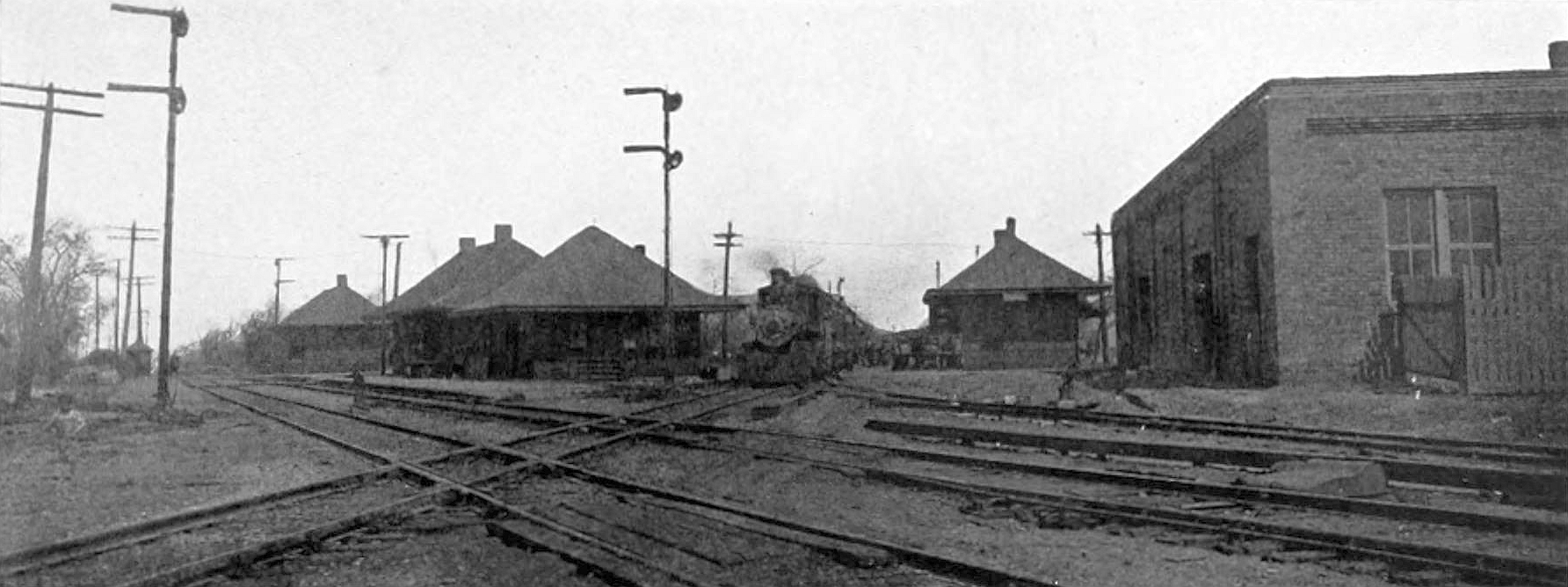
Tracks and depots of the Baltimore and Ohio Railroad and Chicago and Eastern Illinois Railroad in Pana, 1913

The area around Pana was first organized as Stone Coal Precinct in 1845. The county's precincts became townships in 1856, and Stone Coal Precinct became Pana Township, Christian County, Illinois. In 1857 the village of Pana was incorporated. The name "Pana" is believed to have been derived from the indigenous tribe, the Pawnee. It developed at the intersection of east–west and north–south railroads, and had supplies of fuel and water for the steam engines of the railroad.

The community became a center of coal mining in the late 19th and early 20th centuries. In April 1899, what is known as the Pana riot broke out after a violent confrontation between black and white miners. Initially a white man was killed (by a policeman, it was later discovered), and white union miners attacked black replacement workers who had been recruited from Alabama. Six additional people were killed: one white (likely also shot by a white man) and five blacks; in addition, six more black miners were wounded. While the immediate violence was quelled, blacks felt tremendous hostility. Rather than return to Alabama and the Jim Crow South, from where they had been recruited, 211 of the nearly 300 African Americans remaining in town moved west to Weir, Kansas, to work at another mine.

Pana came to be known as the City of Roses, a nickname coined by local newsmen, the Jordan Brothers. Many major florists and growers set up shop here. At one time, there were 109 greenhouses in Pana.

Kitchell Park was added to the National Register of Historic Places in 1992. The Louis Jehle House, added to the National Register in 1995, is also located in Pana.

== Geography ==
According to the 2021 census gazetteer files, Pana has a total area of 4.16 square miles (10.77 km^{2}), of which 3.86 square miles (10.00 km^{2}) (or 92.60%) is land and 0.31 square miles (0.80 km^{2}) (or 7.40%) is water.

=== Climate ===
Climate data for Pana, Illinois (1991–2020 normals, extremes 1890–present)
Month	Jan	Feb	Mar	Apr	May	Jun	Jul	Aug	Sep	Oct	Nov	Dec	Year
Record high °F (°C)	74 (23)	76 (24)	88 (31)	92 (33)	101 (38)	106 (41)	115 (46)	108 (42)	105 (41)	95 (35)	84 (29)	74 (23)	115 (46)
Mean daily maximum °F (°C)	36.6 (2.6)	41.5 (5.3)	52.8 (11.6)	65.6 (18.7)	75.5 (24.2)	84.1 (28.9)	87.3 (30.7)	86.3 (30.2)	80.8 (27.1)	68.2 (20.1)	53.4 (11.9)	41.6 (5.3)	64.5 (18.1)
Daily mean °F (°C)	27.9 (−2.3)	32.0 (0.0)	42.1 (5.6)	53.5 (11.9)	63.9 (17.7)	73.1 (22.8)	76.2 (24.6)	74.5 (23.6)	67.8 (19.9)	55.9 (13.3)	43.3 (6.3)	33.1 (0.6)	53.6 (12.0)
Mean daily minimum °F (°C)	19.3 (−7.1)	22.6 (−5.2)	31.3 (−0.4)	41.3 (5.2)	52.3 (11.3)	62.0 (16.7)	65.1 (18.4)	62.7 (17.1)	54.8 (12.7)	43.7 (6.5)	33.2 (0.7)	24.6 (−4.1)	42.7 (5.9)
Record low °F (°C)	−25 (−32)	−24 (−31)	−6 (−21)	17 (−8)	26 (−3)	35 (2)	45 (7)	41 (5)	26 (−3)	17 (−8)	−3 (−19)	−20 (−29)	−25 (−32)
Average precipitation inches (mm)	2.78 (71)	2.15 (55)	3.02 (77)	4.80 (122)	4.75 (121)	5.07 (129)	4.01 (102)	3.00 (76)	3.25 (83)	3.53 (90)	3.68 (93)	2.26 (57)	42.30 (1,074)
Average snowfall inches (cm)	5.1 (13)	2.6 (6.6)	2.6 (6.6)	0.5 (1.3)	0.0 (0.0)	0.0 (0.0)	0.0 (0.0)	0.0 (0.0)	0.0 (0.0)	0.1 (0.25)	0.9 (2.3)	2.7 (6.9)	14.5 (37)
Average precipitation days (≥ 0.01 in)	8.5	8.1	11.0	11.8	12.8	10.8	9.0	8.3	7.8	9.4	9.6	9.0	116.1
Average snowy days (≥ 0.1 in)	2.7	2.2	1.4	0.2	0.0	0.0	0.0	0.0	0.0	0.0	0.5	2.0	9.0
Source: NOAA

== Demographics ==
Historical population
Census	Pop.	Note	%±
1870	2,207		—
1880	3,009		36.3%
1890	5,077		68.7%
1900	5,530		8.9%
1910	6,055		9.5%
1920	6,122		1.1%
1930	5,835		−4.7%
1940	5,966		2.2%
1950	6,178		3.6%
1960	6,432		4.1%
1970	6,326		−1.6%
1980	6,040		−4.5%
1990	5,796		−4.0%
2000	5,614		−3.1%
2010	5,847		4.2%
2020	5,199		−11.1%
U.S. Decennial Census

As of the 2020 census there were 5,199 people, 2,425 households, and 1,320 families residing in the town. The population density was 1,248.56 inhabitants per square mile (482.07/km^{2}). There were 2,772 housing units at an average density of 665.71 per square mile (257.03/km^{2}). The racial makeup of the town was 95.48% White, 0.38% African American, 0.13% Native American, 0.56% Asian, 0.29% from other races, and 3.15% from two or more races. Hispanic or Latino of any race were 0.94% of the population.

There were 2,425 households, out of which 27.6% had children under the age of 18 living with them, 34.27% were married couples living together, 13.77% had a female householder with no husband present, and 45.57% were non-families. 37.57% of all households were made up of individuals, and 18.10% had someone living alone who was 65 years of age or older. The average household size was 2.78 and the average family size was 2.15.

The town's age distribution consisted of 22.9% under the age of 18, 9.0% from 18 to 24, 19.9% from 25 to 44, 25.3% from 45 to 64, and 22.9% who were 65 years of age or older. The median age was 39.8 years. For every 100 females, there were 88.0 males. For every 100 females age 18 and over, there were 91.5 males.

The median income for a household in the town was $47,701, and the median income for a family was $52,935. Males had a median income of $41,116 versus $24,955 for females. The per capita income for the town was $23,692. About 13.3% of families and 15.4% of the population were below the poverty line, including 22.2% of those under age 18 and 8.3% of those age 65 or over.

== Arts and culture ==
=== Pana Heritage Days ===
The Pana Heritage Days are an annual festival that takes place during the last weekend in May. Streets are blocked off and are filled with multiple vendors and fair rides. Live band music is generally provided.

=== Labor Day Parade ===
The annual Pana Labor Day Parade is attended by up to 15,000 people, the largest such event in all of Illinois. The 2011 parade featured 343 firemen marching to lead the parade in an honor to the firemen, paramedics, and policemen who died in the September 11 attacks. Pana's Labor Day Parade in 2022 was the 88th parade the town has hosted.

=== Tri-County Fair ===
The Tri-County Fair is held annually and lasts for six days. The fair begins on the Wednesday before Labor Day and ends on Labor Day. It features many carnival rides, vendors, and games. Average attendance per day is 7,000.

== Notable people ==
- Nin Alexander (1858–1933), player for the Kansas City Unions and the St. Louis Browns
- Warren Amling (1924–2001), football and basketball player, 1984 College Football Hall of Fame inductee
- Michael J. Budds, (1947–2020) musicologist, author, and philanthropist
- Howard Graham Buffett (born 1954), author, activist and philanthropist
- Thomas Henry Carter (1854–1911), U.S. senator from Montana
- Ed Coady (1867–1890), quarterback for Notre Dame
- Pat Coady (1867–1943), quarterback for Notre Dame
- Mike Cvengros (1900–1974), pitcher with various teams
- John Wesley Fribley (1906–2002), Illinois state senator
- Garet Garrett (1878–1954), 20th-century econo-political commentator
- Hector Honore (1905–1983), race car driver, inducted into the National Sprint Car Hall of Fame & Museum
- Jeff Keener (born 1959), pitcher for the St. Louis Cardinals
- Dick Klein (1934–2005), All-Star offensive lineman for various teams
- Albert Marsh (1877–1944), inventor of chromel, born in Pana
- Vincent Sheean (1899–1975), war correspondent and author, born in Pana
- Herb Siegert (1924–2008), former guard for the Washington Redskins, born in Pana
