= George H. Cox House =

Historic house in Illinois, United States

- U.S. National Register of Historic Places
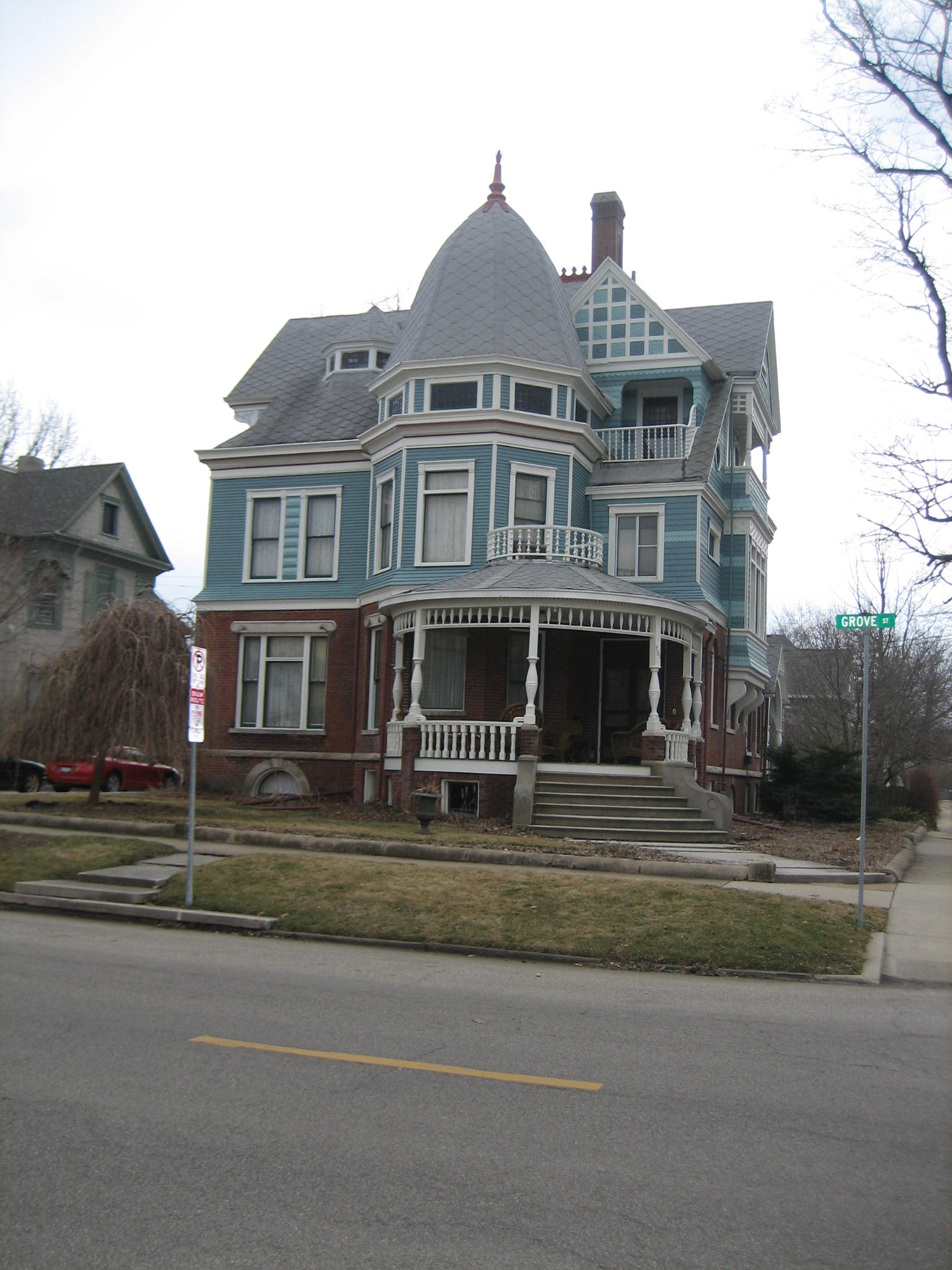

- Location within Illinois Location within the United States
- Location: 701 E. Grove St., Bloomington, Illinois
- Coordinates: 40°28′39″N 88°59′1″W
- Area: 1 acre (0.40 ha)
- Built: 1886
- Built by: J. H. McGregor
- Architect: George H. Miller
- NRHP reference No.: 85002838
- Added to NRHP: November 14, 1985

The George H. Cox House is a historic house located at 701 E. Grove St. in Bloomington, Illinois. It is considered a particularly fine example of the residential work of architect George H. Miller.

== History ==
George H. Cox was secretary-treasurer and general manager of the Hungarian Roller Mill Company. The company was owned by his brother Thomas. Cox also co-owned a flour mill with William Hasenwinkle. He served on the board of the Corn Belt Bank. Architect George H. Miller designed the home in 1886 in the Queen Anne style. Cox had a close association with Miller, who designed the Corn Belt Bank. Miller also designed the Bruner building for Cox's in-laws. J. H. McGregor was selected as contractor for the $20,000 house. The house was added to the National Register of Historic Places on November 14, 1985. It is also a contributing property of the East Grove Street District.

== Architecture ==
The house's front entrance is located within a circular porch supported by turned columns; the porch's roof is topped by a small balcony. An octagonal tower with stained glass windows and a bell-shaped dome is located behind the porch. A second-floor balcony with a mock half-timbered gable is partially hidden behind the right side of the tower. A small octagonal dormer, also featuring stained glass windows, is located to the left of the tower.
