= Ed Coady =

American football player (1867–1890)

- Born: May 29, 1867; Pana, Illinois
- Died: April 5, 1890 (aged 22); South Bend, Indiana

Edmond Hoffman Coady (May 29, 1867 in Pana, Illinois – April 5, 1890 in South Bend, Indiana) was an American football player and a starting quarterback for the University of Notre Dame, holding the distinction of having presided over the first two wins in Notre Dame football history.

Following the first three games ever played by the team, quarterback Joe Cusack moved to left halfback in 1888, and Ed Coady assumed the position. His first start would also be the first victory for the program—a 20–0 win over Harvard Prep Chicago, who had previously been deemed champions of the state of Illinois. By virtue of their win, Notre Dame declared themselves champions of both Illinois and Indiana.

In 1889, Coady's team played their first true away game at Northwestern and won 9–0. During the game, Coady performed what was likely the team's first play-action fake: He simulated a handoff to end Steve Fleming, and hid the ball as he ran into the endzone for a touchdown. Ed died in South Bend the following spring.

Ed was one of three Coady brothers to play for Notre Dame. His brother Tom Coady was the backup quarterback in 1888, and then Pat Coady would succeed his brothers as the starting quarterback in 1892.
