= David Hyatt Van Dolah House =

Historic house in Illinois, United States

- U.S. National Register of Historic Places
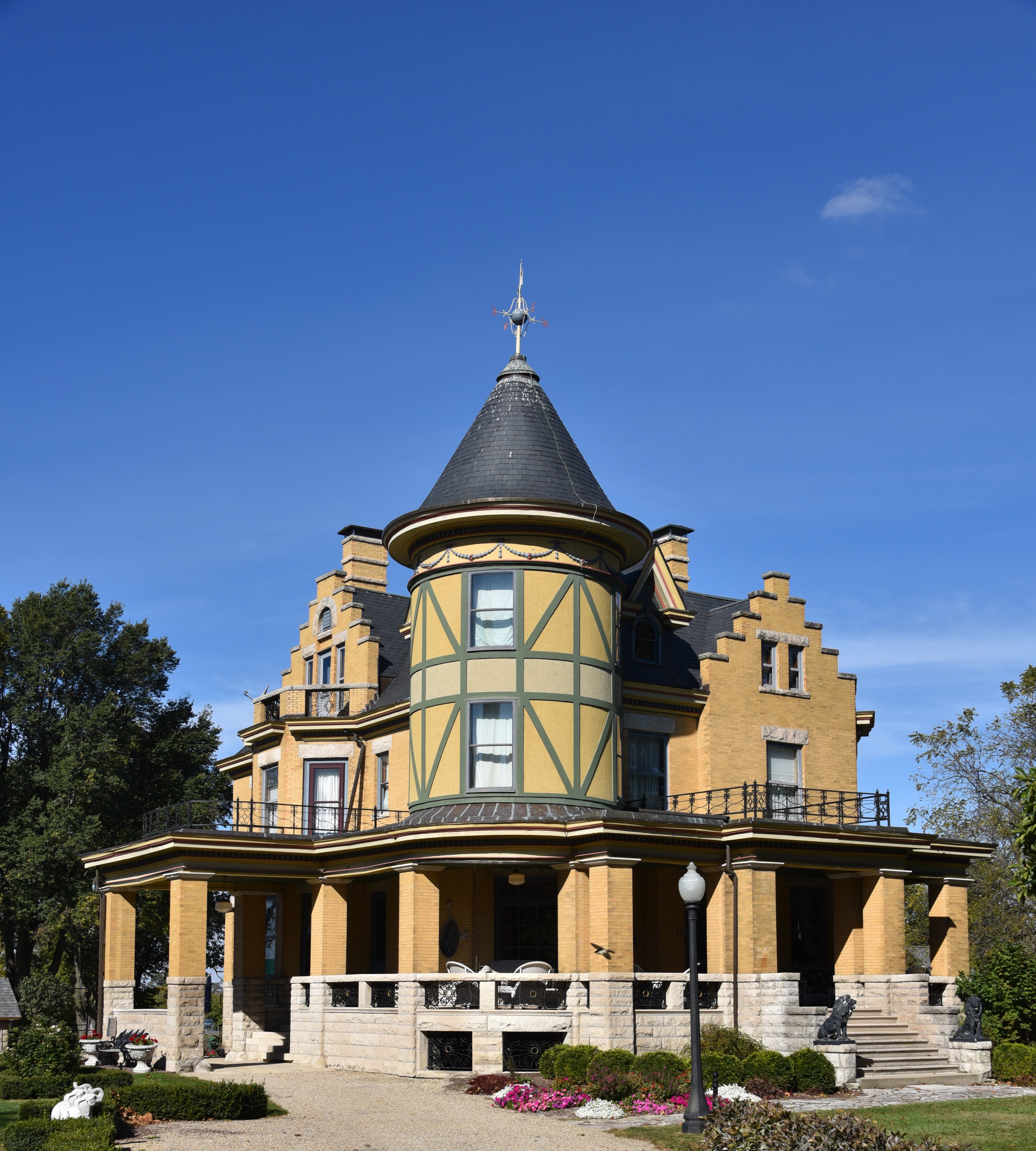

- Location within Illinois Location within the United States
- Location: 10 N. Spencer St., Lexington, Illinois
- Coordinates: 40°38′32″N 88°47′37″W
- Built: 1898
- Architect: George H. Miller & James E. Fisher
- NRHP reference No.: 15000590
- Added to NRHP: September 14, 2015

The David Hyatt Van Dolah House (locally known as The Castle) is a historic house located at 10 North Spencer Street in Lexington, Illinois. The house was built in 1898 for David Hyatt Van Dolah, a prominent local landowner best known as an importer and broker of French horses. Architect George H. Miller, one of the most well-regarded architects in the Bloomington area, and his partner James E. Fisher designed the house in the Queen Anne style. The front of the house features a large round turret on one corner, a wraparound porch, and a large stepped gable opposite the turret. The house's exterior is decorated with brickwork patterns, a departure from the ornamental woodwork usually used to side Queen Anne homes. The hipped roof of the house features cross gables, a cone atop the turret, and several pinnacles and spires.

The house was added to the National Register of Historic Places on September 14, 2015.
