= Marching Salukis =

Marching band of Southern Illinois University Carbondale

- School: Southern Illinois University Carbondale
- Location: Carbondale, Illinois
- Conference: Missouri Valley
- Founded: 1960 by Donald Canedy
- Director: George Brozak
- Members: 190
- Fight song: "Go, Southern, Go"
- Website: marchingsalukis.siuc.edu

The Marching Salukis is the official marching band of Southern Illinois University Carbondale. Composed of men and women, the band performs at all SIU football home games and marches in parades for SIU homecoming, the Du Quoin State Fair, and Carbondale Lights Fantastic. The band has also performed in halftime programs for the Chicago Bears, St. Louis Cardinals, Green Bay Packers and St. Louis Rams, as well as presidential addresses in Carbondale by Bill Clinton.

The band is known for its "Saluki Salute to America", a patriotic medley that opens with "America The Beautiful" and then moves to "The Star-Spangled Banner", performed by two solo, antiphonal trumpets. "Salute to America" has been performed by the band at many functions, including the 1982 World Series.

== History ==
The Marching Salukis began as a military-style marching band, evolving into its present form around 1964 under the directorship of Donald Canedy. Tuxedo jackets and homburg hats were adopted as the uniform, arrangements of jazz, big band, and rock music started to come into use, and a loose approach to marching drills was taken. Many of the early arrangements were written by Grammy-winning composer Glen Daum, a trombonist in the band in the 1960s, and are still in use. In the late 1960s to 1997, the band was led by Michael D. Hanes. Other directors have included Nick Koenigstein(1967-68 while Hanes was on military tour of duty), Dan Philips (assistant 1988–1997), Travis Almany (1997), Matt Bishop (1998), Thomas Bough (1999–2005), and Andrew Tucker (2005–2009). In 2009, the School of Music hired Dr. George Brozak, former director of The Mighty Sound of the Southeast, as the new director.

The Marching Salukis featured several innovations in its early years, including a baby grand piano on wheels, wheeled percussion carts (the "Rhythm on Wheels", which included a pair of timpani) and a violist (usually a non-musician playing a dummy instrument although Dane Ronvik actually performed on cello in the early 1980s).

The tuxedo uniform has gone through several alterations over the years. For a time, there were different colored jackets for the various sections of the band: Black band (low brass and tenor and baritone saxophones), red band (high brass, alto saxophones and the other woodwinds), plaid band (percussion) and white band (drum majors). In 1989, the uniform was changed to maroon jackets (former black band), white jackets (former red band) and maroon vests. The drum majors wear all-white tailcoats. The uniform was changed again in 2010 to coincide with the opening of SIUC's new Saluki Stadium. The new uniform is a modern interpretation of the Marching Saluki tradition of tuxedo-style attire. The new uniform consists of a tuxedo style top which emulates a jacket, vest, ruffle front shirt and bow tie, and black pants. The drum majors wear white coats and the instrumentalists wear maroon coats. Unlike previous incarnations which included a homburg hat, the new design incorporates a fedora. In the 2015 marching season, the use of drum major batons was incorporated into the pre-game show.

In 2013, the band received a gracious grant from the Chancellor for new instruments. All members now use instruments provided by the school, paying only a modest maintenance fee.

In recent decades, the marching drills on the field have become more contemporary with innovative formations and the addition of a snare drum line. However, the parade drills still feature some scramble band remnants, namely the "Saluki Scatter", during which the band members break formation and greet bystanders on the parade route. In the late 1980s, the Saluki Silks became the official color guard to the band and in 2011, the Saluki Dazzlers became the official dance team of the band.

Administered by the SIU School of Music, the Marching Salukis are a music class (MUS 011) and members receive one course credit for participation in the band. Membership in the band is open to all student musicians, music majors or not, while the drum line, Saluki Dazzlers, and Saluki Silks is by audition. Members of the Marching Salukis in the 2024 season also received a $500 stipend for membership.

== Saluki Pep Band ==
During basketball season, the Saluki Pep Band performs at all home games of the Salukis' men's and women's basketball teams. The Pep Band, like the Marching Band, is open to all students. It is also administered by the School of Music and is also worth one course credit. With the success of the men's basketball team, the pep band has traveled to the Missouri Valley Conference tournament as well as the NCAA Sweet 16 in 2002 and 2007.

== Saluki Dazzlers ==
The Saluki Dazzlers, founded in 2011, are the official dance team of the Marching Salukis. They perform with the band during all performances, pregame, halftime, parades, etc. Although the dance team is still new and not as known, each year its size increases rapidly and the number of students who audition drastically goes up.

== Featured Twirlers ==
The Featured Twirlers are the baton performers with the Marching Salukis who perform alongside the band.

== Alumni band ==
The SIU Alumni Band has been an official constituency group of the SIU Alumni Association since 1989.
