= University Museum =

University Museum is a common shorthand name for a number of university museums and may refer to:

- Oxford University Museum of Natural History, Oxford, England, UK
- University Museum and Art Gallery at the University of Hong Kong, Hong Kong, China
- University Museum (Harvard University), Cambridge, Massachusetts, USA
- University Museum (Southern Illinois University Carbondale), Carbondale, Illinois, USA
- University Museum (University of Tokyo), Tokyo, Japan
