= Carbondale, Illinois =

- City
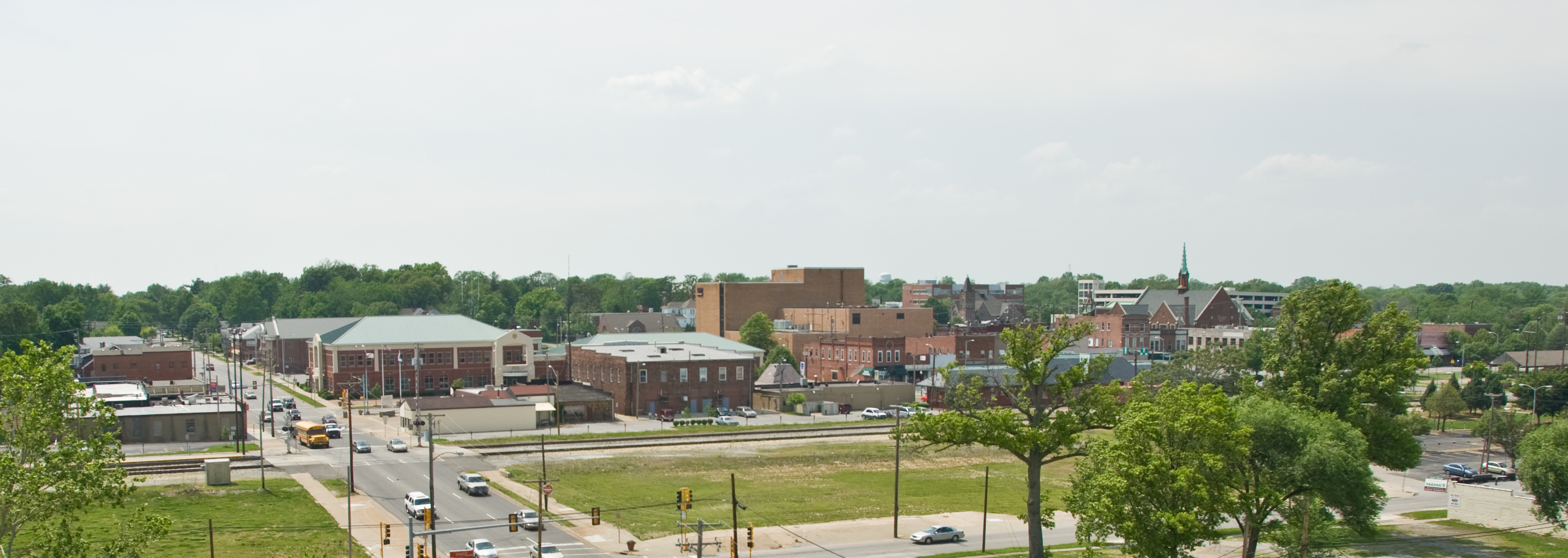
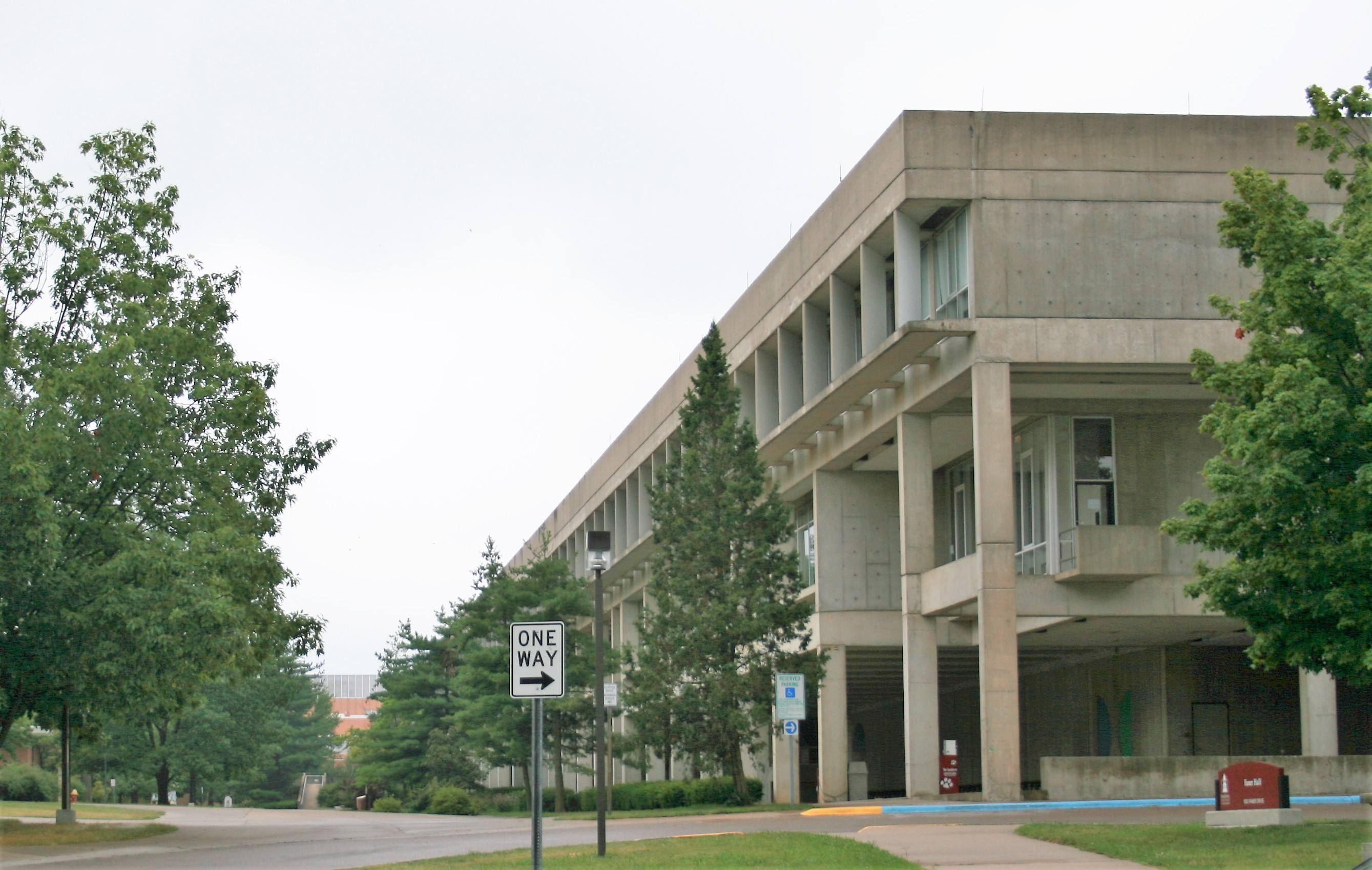
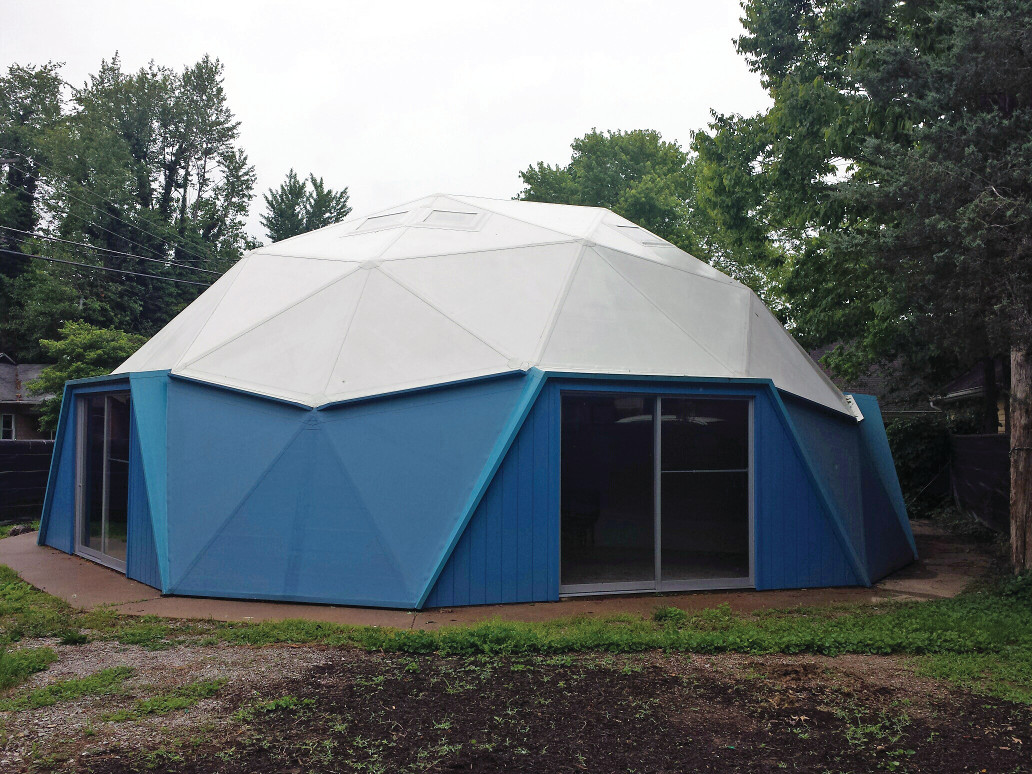
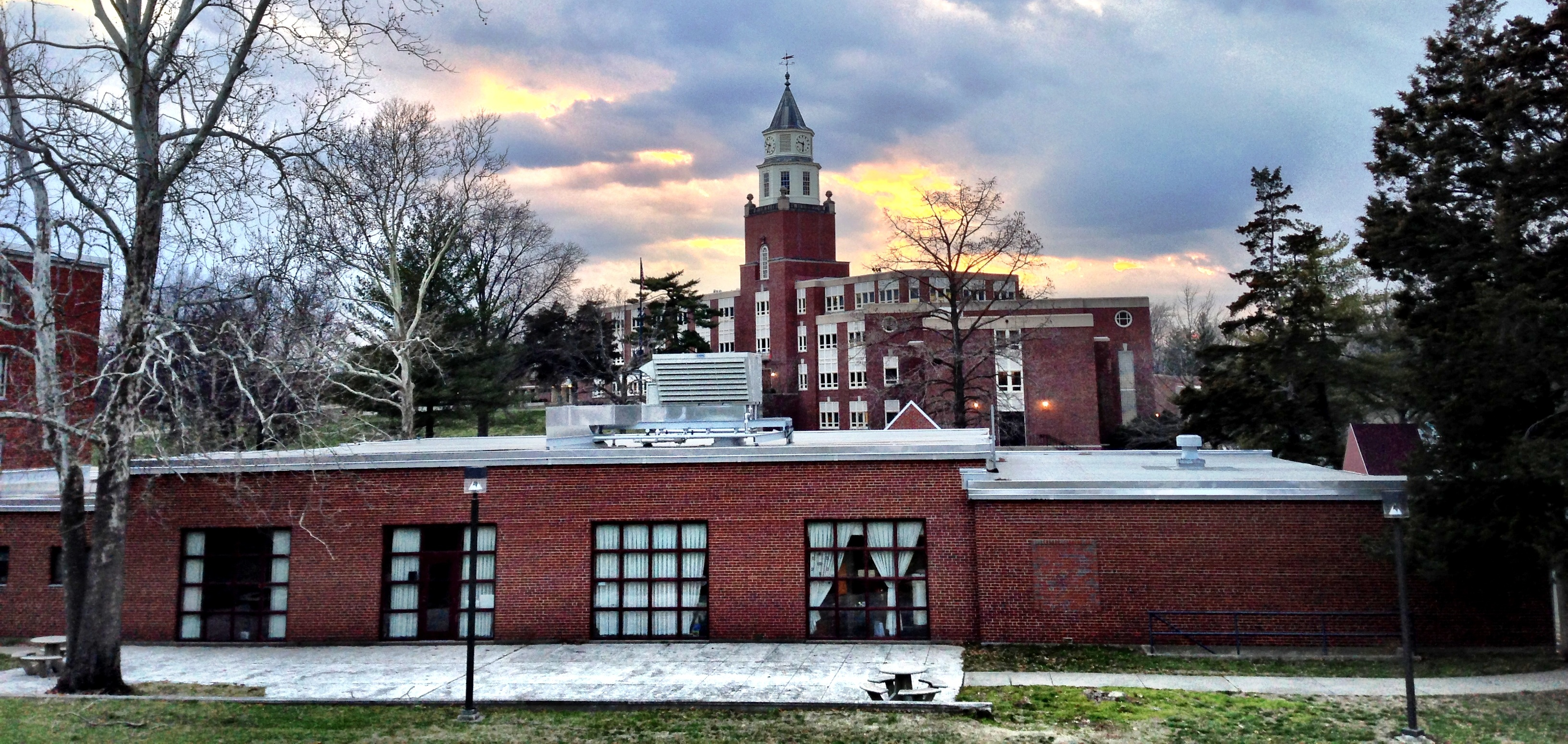
- Downtown Carbondale Faner Hall and Sharp Museum Fuller and Hewlett Dome Home Southern Illinois University Carbondale

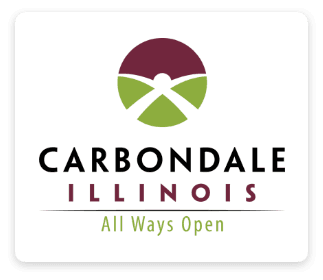
- Flag Seal Logo
- Nickname: Eclipse Crossroads of America
- Motto: All Ways Open
- Location of Carbondale in Jackson County, Illinois

- Location within Illinois Location within the United States
- Coordinates: 37°43′20″N 89°14′30″W
- Country: United States
- State: Illinois
- County: Jackson, Williamson
- Townships: Carbondale, Murphysboro, Makanda
- Precincts: Carterville
- Founded: 1852
- Incorporated Town: 1856

Government
  - Type: Council–manager

Area
  - City: 17.86 sq mi (46.25 km^{2})
  - Land: 17.42 sq mi (45.13 km^{2})
  - Water: 0.44 sq mi (1.13 km^{2})
- Elevation: 449 ft (137 m)

Population (2020)
  - City: 21,857
  - Density: 1,254.5/sq mi (484.36/km^{2})
  - Metro: 132,693 (Carbondale-Marion-Herrin IL CSA)
- Time zone: UTC−6 (CST)
  - Summer (DST): UTC−5 (CDT)
- ZIP Codes: 62901, 62902, 62903
- Area code: 618
- FIPS code: 17-11163
- GNIS feature ID: 2393739
- Website: www.explorecarbondale.com

Carbondale is a city in Jackson County, Illinois, United States, within the Southern Illinois region informally known as "Little Egypt". As of the 2020 census, the city had a population of 25,083, making it the most populous city in Southern Illinois outside the Metro East region of Greater St. Louis.

Carbondale was established in 1853 and developed as a crossroads of the railroad industry. Today, the major roadways of Illinois Route 13 and U.S. Route 51 intersect in the city. The city is located 96 miles (154 km) southeast of St. Louis on the northern edge of the Shawnee National Forest. It is the home of the main campus of Southern Illinois University.

== History ==
In August 1853, Daniel Harmon Brush, John Asgill Conner, and Dr. William Richart bought a 360-acre (1.5 km^{2}) parcel of land between two proposed railroad station sites (Makanda and De Soto) and two county seats (Murphysboro and Marion). Brush named Carbondale for the large deposit of coal in the area. The first train through Carbondale arrived on Independence Day 1854, traveling north on the main line from Cairo, Illinois. By the time of the American Civil War, Carbondale had developed as a regional center for transportation and business, surrounded by agricultural development. This part of Illinois was known as "Little Egypt" because of the confluence of the Ohio and Mississippi rivers, where the town of Cairo is located.

The city has had a college since 1856 beginning with the Presbyterian-founded Carbondale College which was later converted to an elementary school. Carbondale also won the bid for the new state teacher training school for the region, and Southern Illinois Normal University opened in 1874. This gave the town new industry, new citizens, and a supplement to public schools. In 1947, the name was changed to Southern Illinois University (SIU). It has become the flagship of the Southern Illinois University system. This institution, now recognized as a national research university, has nearly 11,000 students enrolled (as of 2026) and offers a wide variety of undergraduate and graduate specialties.

On April 29, 1866, one of the first formal Memorial Day observations following the Civil War was held at the city's Woodlawn Cemetery. Local resident, General John A. Logan, gave the principal address. Logan, as co-founder of the Civil War veteran's group the "Grand Army of the Republic", issued General Order #11 on March 3, 1868, calling for a national day of remembrance for Civil War dead. This order served as the basis for the creation of a formal Memorial Day. Logan called observance day "Decoration Day" and proposed it for May 30, to assure flowers would be in bloom nationwide.

In the early 20th century, Carbondale was known as the "Athens of Egypt," due to the expansion of the college and university, and the region's moniker of "Little Egypt." The phrase dates to at least 1903, when it appeared in a local paper. By 1922, the Carbondale Free Press was using the phrase on its flag.

On November 12, 1970, a largescale shootout occurred between local police and members of the local chapter of the Black Panther Party who were meeting at a house in town. The event was later chronicled in the documentary 778 Bullets, made by a professor at SIU.

An area near campus known as "The Strip" was also the site of several infamous riots on Halloween in the 1980s and 1990s. The last Halloween riot occurred in 2000, when students clashed with and were tear gassed by police. Property and trees in the area of The Strip were destroyed. After the 2000 riot, measures were taken to prevent violence on Halloween weekend. The campus and the bars along Southern Illinois Avenue were closed on Halloween in following years.

=== Eclipse Crossroads of America ===
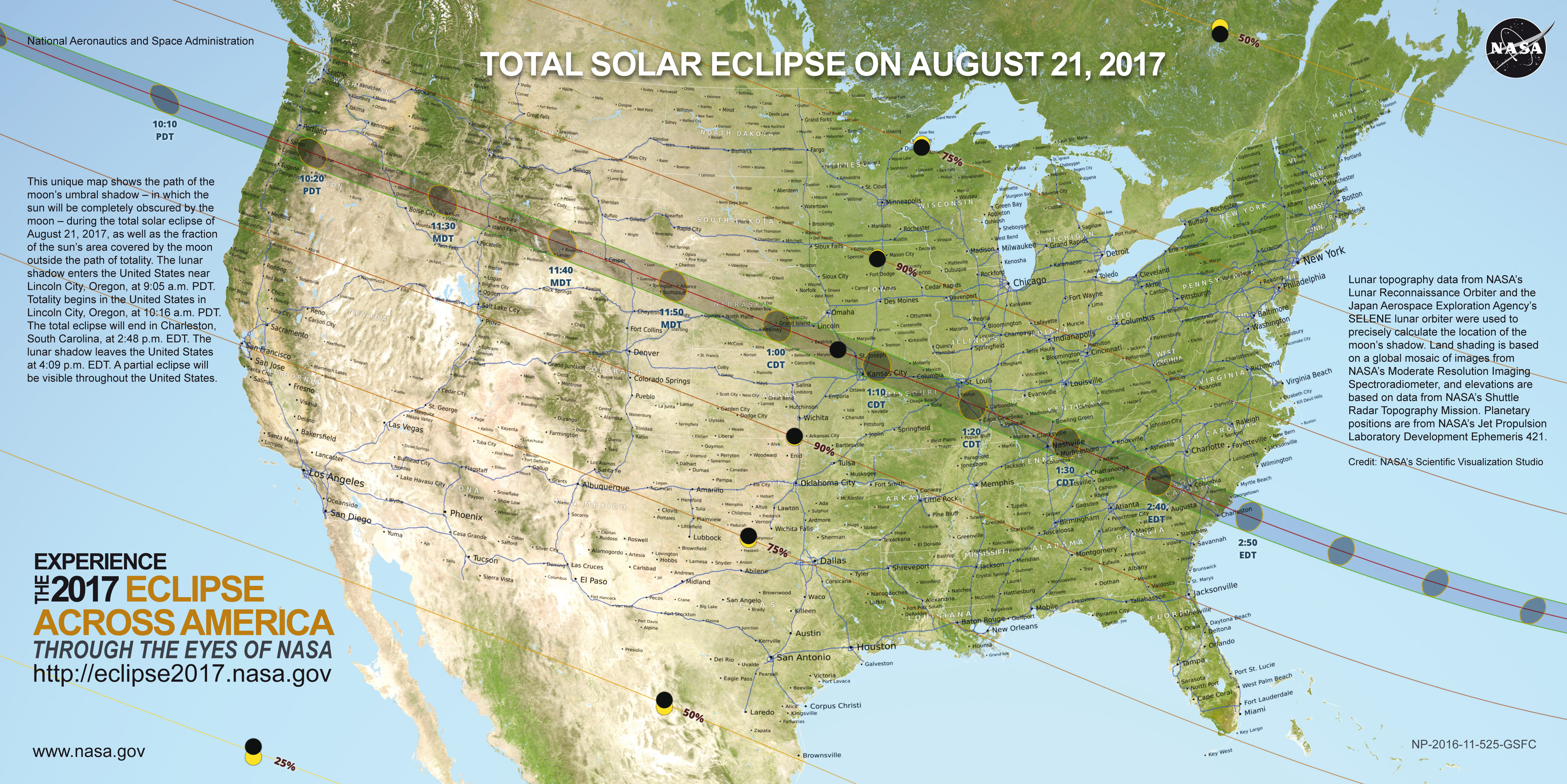

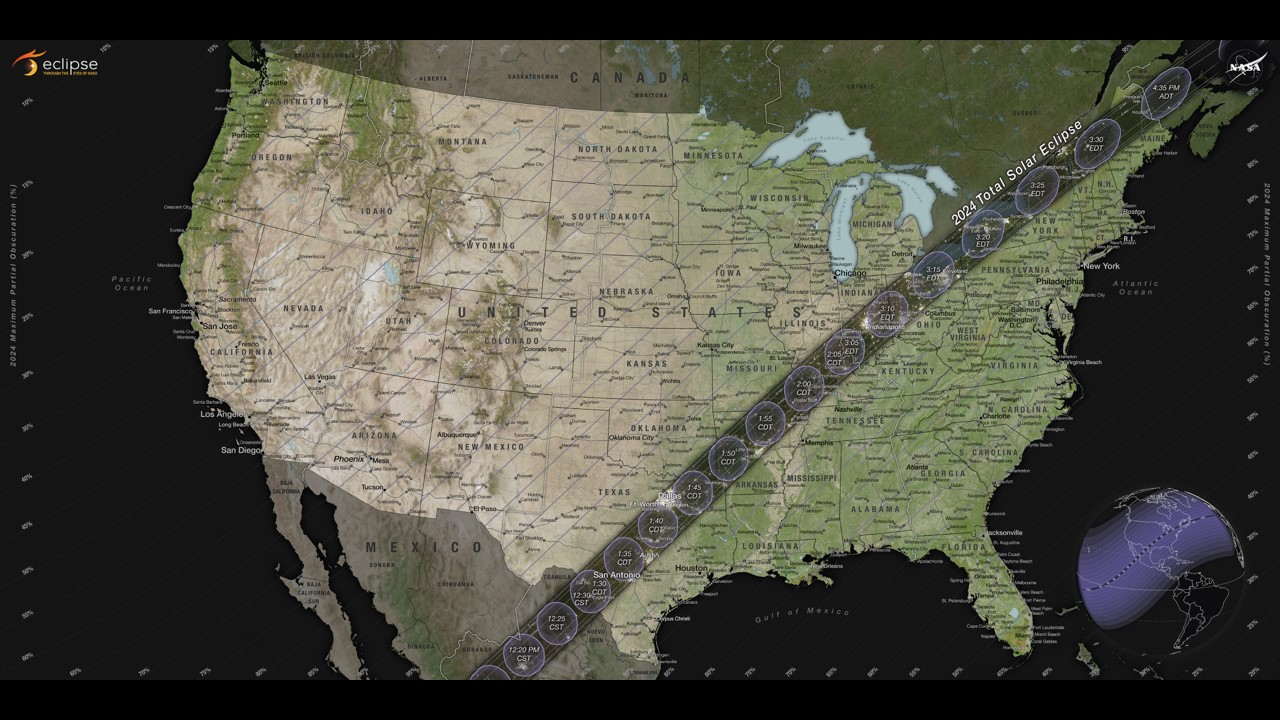
Carbondale experienced two total solar eclipses in seven years.

The area was in totality during the solar eclipse of August 21, 2017, with Giant City State Park, just south of the city, experiencing the longest period of totality during the eclipse (approximately 2 minutes and 40 seconds). It was also within the path of totality of the solar eclipse of April 8, 2024, making it one of only a handful of cities within the direct paths of both eclipses. The combination of these events earned it the nickname "Eclipse Crossroads of America". In February 2017, the City of Carbondale spent $98,000 to rebrand itself with a new eclipse-themed logo.

== Geography ==
Carbondale is located in the watershed of the Big Muddy River, at 415 feet (126 m) above sea level.

According to the 2010 census, Carbondale has a total area of 17.519 square miles (45.37 km^{2}), of which 17.09 square miles (44.26 km^{2}) (or 97.55%) is land and 0.429 square miles (1.11 km^{2}) (or 2.45%) is water.

=== Climate ===
Carbondale lies in the northern limits of a humid subtropical climate (Köppen Cfa), with four distinct seasons. The monthly daily average temperature ranges from 32.4 °F (0.2 °C) in January to 77.9 °F (25.5 °C) in July. On average, there are 38 days of 90 °F (32 °C)+ highs, 16 days where the high fails to rise above freezing, and 1.6 nights of sub-0 °F (−18 °C) per year. It has an average annual precipitation of 48.95 inches (1,240 mm), including an average 11.4 inches (29 cm) of snow. Extremes in temperature range from −25 °F (−32 °C) on January 11, 1977, up to 113 °F (45 °C) on August 9, 1930.

Carbondale receives thunderstorms on an average of 50 days per year. Particularly in the spring, these storms can often be severe, with high winds, damaging hail, and tornadoes.

Climate data for Carbondale Sewage Plant, Illinois (1991–2020 normals, extremes 1898–present)
Month	Jan	Feb	Mar	Apr	May	Jun	Jul	Aug	Sep	Oct	Nov	Dec	Year
Record high °F (°C)	76 (24)	79 (26)	93 (34)	92 (33)	101 (38)	107 (42)	112 (44)	113 (45)	108 (42)	96 (36)	88 (31)	77 (25)	113 (45)
Mean daily maximum °F (°C)	41.3 (5.2)	46.3 (7.9)	56.1 (13.4)	67.7 (19.8)	76.6 (24.8)	84.9 (29.4)	88.1 (31.2)	87.4 (30.8)	81.2 (27.3)	69.9 (21.1)	56.2 (13.4)	45.4 (7.4)	66.8 (19.3)
Daily mean °F (°C)	32.4 (0.2)	36.4 (2.4)	45.3 (7.4)	56.0 (13.3)	65.9 (18.8)	74.4 (23.6)	77.9 (25.5)	76.0 (24.4)	68.6 (20.3)	57.0 (13.9)	45.5 (7.5)	36.3 (2.4)	56.0 (13.3)
Mean daily minimum °F (°C)	23.4 (−4.8)	26.4 (−3.1)	34.5 (1.4)	44.3 (6.8)	55.1 (12.8)	63.9 (17.7)	67.6 (19.8)	64.6 (18.1)	56.0 (13.3)	44.1 (6.7)	34.8 (1.6)	27.2 (−2.7)	45.2 (7.3)
Record low °F (°C)	−25 (−32)	−22 (−30)	−11 (−24)	20 (−7)	29 (−2)	39 (4)	42 (6)	41 (5)	20 (−7)	16 (−9)	−1 (−18)	−14 (−26)	−25 (−32)
Average precipitation inches (mm)	3.36 (85)	3.11 (79)	4.52 (115)	5.55 (141)	5.18 (132)	4.60 (117)	4.12 (105)	3.16 (80)	3.44 (87)	3.70 (94)	4.49 (114)	3.72 (94)	48.95 (1,243)
Average snowfall inches (cm)	3.2 (8.1)	4.0 (10)	1.3 (3.3)	0.0 (0.0)	0.0 (0.0)	0.0 (0.0)	0.0 (0.0)	0.0 (0.0)	0.0 (0.0)	0.2 (0.51)	0.0 (0.0)	2.7 (6.9)	11.4 (29)
Average precipitation days (≥ 0.01 in)	10.3	9.3	12.2	11.7	12.9	9.9	9.1	8.6	7.9	8.8	9.6	10.9	121.2
Average snowy days (≥ 0.1 in)	1.7	1.7	0.4	0.0	0.0	0.0	0.0	0.0	0.0	0.1	0.0	1.7	5.6
Source: NOAA

== Demographics ==
Historical population
Census	Pop.	Note	%±
1880	2,213		—
1890	2,832		28.0%
1900	3,318		17.2%
1910	5,411		63.1%
1920	6,207		14.7%
1930	7,528		21.3%
1940	8,550		13.6%
1950	10,921		27.7%
1960	14,670		34.3%
1970	22,816		55.5%
1980	26,414		15.8%
1990	27,033		2.3%
2000	25,597		−5.3%
2010	25,902		1.2%
2020	25,083		−3.2%
U.S. Decennial Census

=== Racial and ethnic composition ===
Carbondale city, Illinois – Racial and ethnic composition Note: the US Census treats Hispanic/Latino as an ethnic category. This table excludes Latinos from the racial categories and assigns them to a separate category. Hispanics/Latinos may be of any race.
Race / Ethnicity (NH = Non-Hispanic)	Pop 2000	Pop 2010	Pop 2020	% 2000	% 2010	% 2020
White alone (NH)	13,384	15,571	11,507	64.72%	60.12%	52.65%
Black or African American alone (NH)	4,750	6,560	5,560	22.97%	25.33%	25.44%
Native American or Alaska Native alone (NH)	39	69	53	0.19%	0.27%	0.24%
Asian alone (NH)	1,373	1,448	1,713	6.64%	5.59%	7.84%
Pacific Islander alone (NH)	15	17	12	0.07%	0.07%	0.05%
Other race alone (NH)	57	78	135	0.28%	0.30%	0.62%
Mixed race or Multiracial (NH)	433	749	1,243	2.09%	2.89%	5.69%
Hispanic or Latino (any race)	630	1,410	1,634	3.05%	5.44%	7.48%
Total	20,681	25,902	21,857	100.00%	100.00%	100.00%

=== 2020 census ===
As of the 2020 census, Carbondale had a population of 25,083. The population density was 1,225.72 inhabitants per square mile (473.25/km^{2}). The median age was 26.6 years. 16.2% of residents were under the age of 18 and 11.7% of residents were 65 years of age or older. For every 100 females there were 99.2 males, and for every 100 females age 18 and over there were 99.3 males age 18 and over.

98.5% of residents lived in urban areas, while 1.5% lived in rural areas.

There were 9,748 households and 3,757 families in Carbondale; 18.8% had children under the age of 18 living in them. Of all households, 19.4% were married-couple households, 33.6% were households with a male householder and no spouse or partner present, and 38.8% were households with a female householder and no spouse or partner present. About 47.4% of all households were made up of individuals and 9.4% had someone living alone who was 65 years of age or older.

There were 12,312 housing units, of which 20.8% were vacant. The homeowner vacancy rate was 5.8% and the rental vacancy rate was 19.8%.

Racial composition as of the 2020 census
Race	Number	Percent
White	11,876	54.3%
Black or African American	5,627	25.7%
American Indian and Alaska Native	116	0.5%
Asian	1,719	7.9%
Native Hawaiian and Other Pacific Islander	15	0.1%
Some other race	848	3.9%
Two or more races	1,656	7.6%
Hispanic or Latino (of any race)	1,634	7.5%

=== Income and poverty ===
The median income for a household in the city was $24,093, and the median income for a family was $53,590. Males had a median income of $18,141 versus $20,475 for females. The per capita income for the city was $21,878. About 24.6% of families and 39.6% of the population were below the poverty line, including 46.8% of those under age 18 and 11.5% of those age 65 or over.

Traditional measures of income and poverty can be misleading when applied to cities with high student populations, such as Carbondale.

== Arts and culture ==
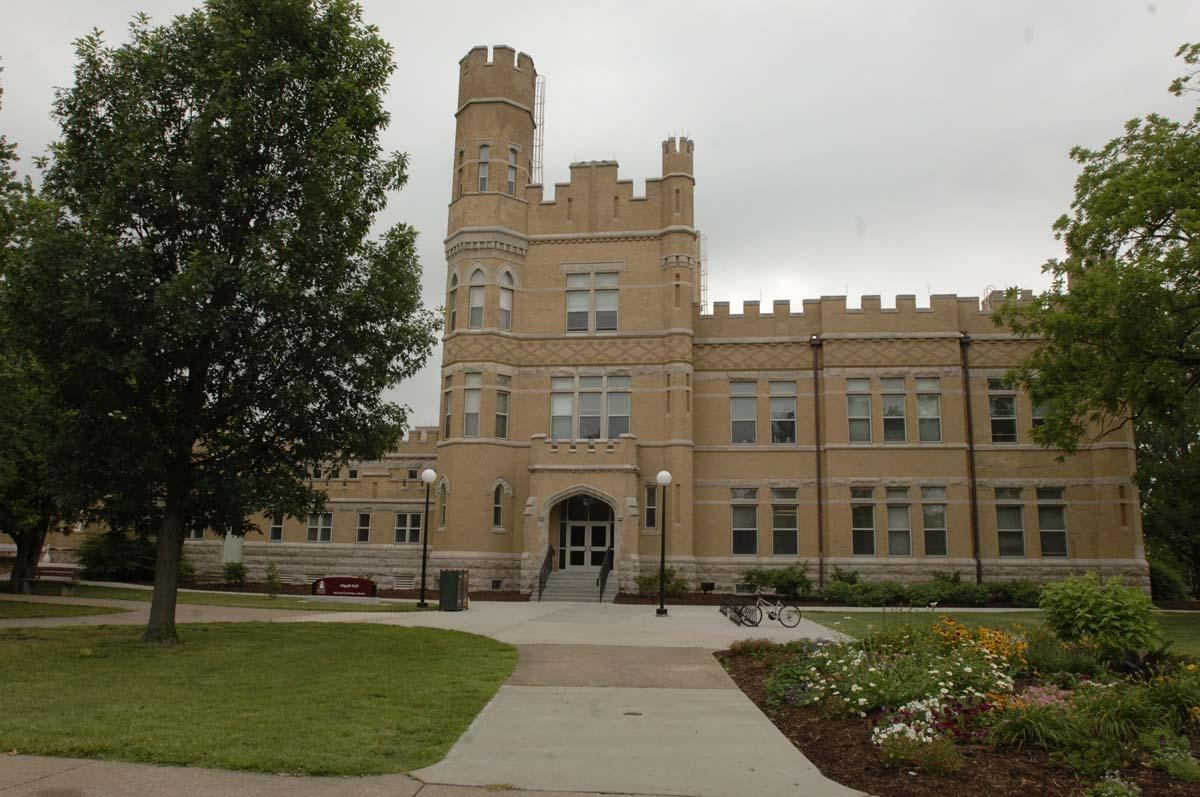
Altgeld Hall at Southern Illinois University Carbondale

In addition to Southern Illinois University, which presents regular concerts and theatrical productions, as well as art and history exhibits, the city has a variety of unique cultural institutions.

SIU has a teaching museum on campus, the University Museum, which has 60,000 artifacts in its collection and hosts traveling shows from known artists. In addition to the University Museum, there is the African American Museum and The Science Center. Theater-goers can see both professional and student-produced plays and performances at the university's McLeod and Kleinau Theaters. SIUC is also home to the largest auditorium in Southern Illinois, Shryock Auditorium. Shryock Auditorium has brought in many performing artists, such as B. B. King, The Supremes, Ray Charles, and Judy Collins, along with orchestras and other musical productions. Carbondale is also home to Lost Cross, the longest running DIY punk venue in the country, which has hosted local and national acts.

Theater-goers can also attend off-campus productions by The Jackson County Stage Company (Stage Company). In 2007, the Stage Company and Carbondale Community Arts (CCA) partnered to purchase and renovate the Varsity Theater, which had been vacant since 2003, into the Varsity Center for the Arts (VCA). The VCA is now the performing home of the Stage Company and also supports a variety of other fine arts and performances through the CCA.

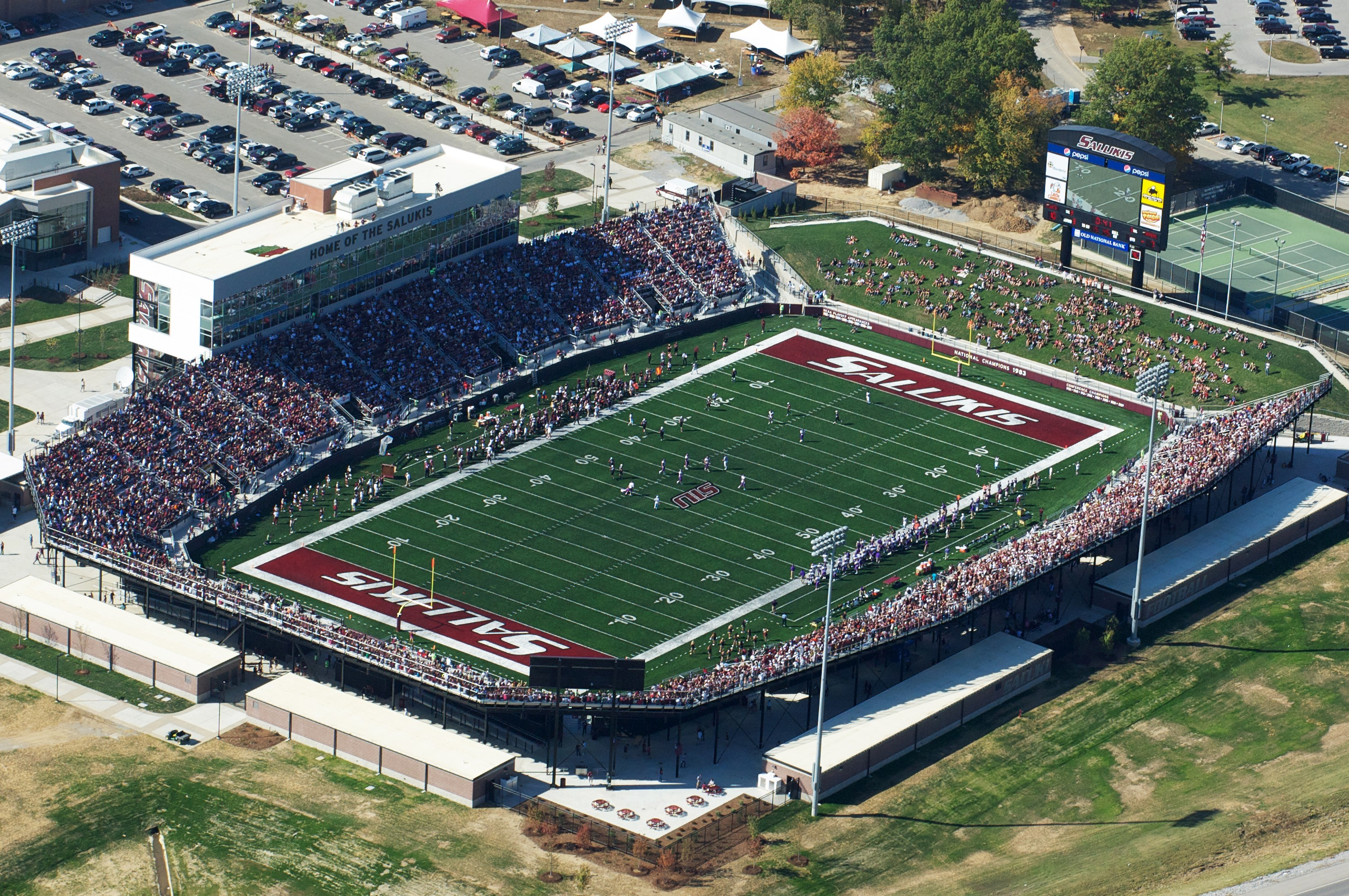
Saluki Stadium

Civic action is encouraged by groups such as Carbondale Conversations for Community Action, the local implementation of study circles. There are several lodges and clubs, such as the Fraternal Order of Eagles, Elks, Rotary International, and the A.F.A.M (Freemasonry).

The Women's Center, in continuous service since its founding in 1972, was one of the first domestic violence shelters in the United States.

Spirituality finds expression in Carbondale in churches of a variety of Christian denominations, a Unitarian Universalist fellowship, two mosques, a Jewish congregation, a Sufi community, and two Buddhist organizations — the Shawnee Dharma Group and the Sunyata Center. The first Hindu temple in Southern Illinois held its grand opening in Carbondale in June 2013. The Gaia House Interfaith Center provides space for intercultural exchange and personal growth. It is also an education center to help the community become more ecologically conscious, understand how to incorporate better practices into daily life, and set goals for the future.

Notable poets that reside in or near Carbondale include Rodney Jones, Judy Jordan, Allison Joseph, and the Transpoetic Playground collective.

Carbondale also has a growing stand-up comedy scene, notably including Hannibal Buress, who began his comedy career in the city.

=== Activism ===
Due to the presence of Southern Illinois University, Carbondale residents have a tradition of political activism. While protests during the Vietnam War were peaceful in late 1969, the U.S. invasion of Cambodia and Kent State shootings sparked large anti-war demonstrations on the SIU campus and streets of Carbondale by the spring of 1970. Those events led to the temporary closure of SIU, deployment of the National Guard to restore order, more than 400 arrests, and over $100,000 in property damage.

In 2011, the Occupy Movement took up residence on the lawn of Quigley Hall at Southern Illinois University, occasionally clashing with local police and with university policy.

SIU's Faculty Association went to the picket lines on November 3, 2011, after an agreement could not be reached between the Association and the administration concerning contracts. The other unions—the Non-Tenure Track Faculty Association, the Association of Civil Service Employees, and Graduate Assistants United—all settled with the administration within hours of the picketing action. The Faculty Association came to an agreement with the administration on November 10. The strike was the first ever in the school's history.

Several local organizations are concerned with peace, justice and the environment, including the Peace Coalition of Southern Illinois/Fellowship of Reconciliation, the Shawnee Green Party, the Student Environmental Center, the Southern Illinois Center for a Sustainable Future, and local chapters of the American Civil Liberties Union, the Sierra Club, and the National Audubon Society.

In 2001, the city was the location for the national Green Party Congress.

=== Events ===
Carbondale is known for a number of yearly festivals, including the Lights Fantastic parade in December, the Big Muddy Film Festival (February/March), the Southern Illinois Irish Festival (April), the Indian (Hindu, Sikh and Jain) celebration of Diwali (October/November), the Great Cardboard Boat Regatta (April), the Sunset Concerts (a summer series of free outdoor concerts on the Southern Illinois University campus and in city parks), and Brown Bag Concerts (a spring and fall series of free outdoor concerts in the Town Square Pavilion).

== Economy ==
The city's business districts include several large shopping malls (including University Mall on the east side of town), featuring a mixture of national chain stores and locally owned businesses. In addition, Carbondale is home to many small shops and restaurants, many of them located in the downtown area. The downtown district is supported by Carbondale Main Street, which has listings and information about individual businesses. Because of the large student population in the city, there is a great variety of restaurants, featuring many nationalities of cuisine. Several bars and coffeehouses offer live music, poetry readings, and other entertainment. The Carbondale Chamber of Commerce offers information on local businesses in over 60 categories.

== Parks and recreation ==
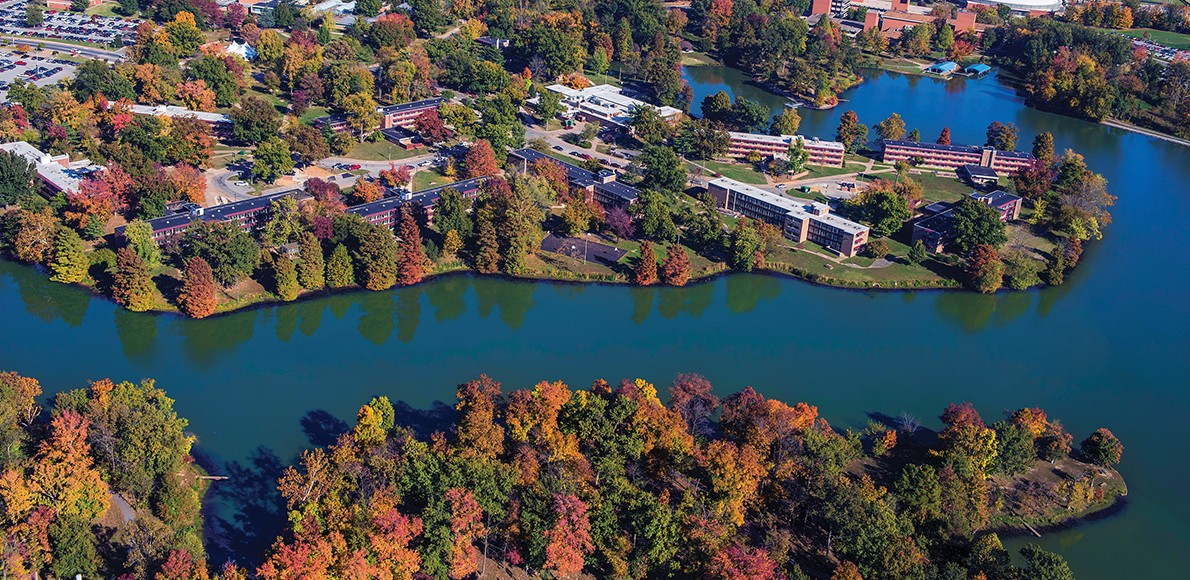
Campus Lake

Carbondale has 18 public tennis courts. It is home to the Superblock, which is a sports multi-complex with baseball, softball, soccer, football, and track fields. The Carbondale Park District maintains seven parks and an indoor pool for public use. In 2010 the park district opened a new spray park in Crispus Attucks Park, and a water park opened in May 2016 at the Superblock. Southern Illinois University's Recreation Center is open to the public; it provides swimming, bowling, rock climbing walls, tennis, basketball, an indoor track, racquetball, weight training, and a variety of exercise equipment.

Carbondale is located near many venues for outdoor activities, including some 14 parks in the immediate vicinity. These include the Crab Orchard National Wildlife Refuge, the Shawnee National Forest, Giant City State Park, Little Grand Canyon, Piney Creek Ravine, Pomona Natural Bridge, the Garden of the Gods Wilderness area, and Trail of Tears State Park. These areas offer opportunities for hiking, boating, biking, and horseback riding.

Five minutes south of Carbondale is the city reservoir, Cedar Lake, which is open to kayaking and canoeing. The north access features several dramatic rock bluffs and secluded bays. Other lakes nearby include Little Grassy Lake, Devils Kitchen Lake, Crab Orchard Lake, and Kinkaid Lake. Another more remote location is Cache River Swamp, the northernmost cypress swamp in North America. The surrounding areas also offer hiking and mountain biking.

Also a few minutes south of Carbondale is Jeremy Rochman Memorial Park, established by Barrett Rochman in memory of his son Jeremy "Boo" Rochman, who died in an auto accident at age 19. It features a castle with life-sized figures on a Dungeons & Dragons theme.

The Shawnee National Forest, close to Carbondale, is home to many wineries. The Shawnee Hills Wine Trail visits twelve vineyards in scenic settings, offering local wines and dining facilities. Several of the vineyards are bed-and-breakfasts or offer cabins for close accommodations.

The presence of Southern Illinois University also means that Carbondale area residents can attend Division I events of SIU's "Salukis" sport teams. The mascot term "Salukis" is a reference to a dog breed from ancient Egypt, a nod to the fact that the Southern Illinois region is frequently referred to by the nickname "Little Egypt."

== Government ==
The city of Carbondale has a council-manager government. There are a total of seven elected city officials: a mayor and six city council members elected at-large for four-year staggered terms. The City Manager, a professional hired by the city council, appoints the department heads. The city provides services such as police, fire, development services, public works, and public library. Several boards and commissions allow for citizen participation, bringing more citizens into civic activities and helping to bridge the gap between the residents and the government. Carbondale is a zoned, home rule municipality. In 2010, the city approved a new comprehensive plan that lays out goals for the future and ways to accomplish these goals. On April 5, 2011, Joel Fritzler was elected mayor for a four-year term, but on February 3, 2014, he resigned to accept a job in Arizona. The City Council chose Don Monty as acting mayor to finish Fritzler's term. On April 7, 2015, John "Mike" Henry was elected mayor, and he took office in May 2015. On April 4, 2023, Carolin Harvey was elected mayor, the first African-American to hold the office; Harvey had been acting mayor since Henry took a leave of absence.

== Media ==
PBS and NPR broadcasting stations (WSIU-TV and WSIU (FM)) are owned and operated by the university. Carbondale also is home to WDBX Community Radio for Southern Illinois, and the Big Muddy Independent Media Center.

Commercial television stations include:

- WSIL-TV channel 3 (ABC; Harrisburg)
- WPSD-TV channel 6 (NBC; Paducah, KY)
- KFVS-TV channel 12 (CBS/The CW; Cape Girardeau, MO)
- KBSI channel 23 (Fox; Cape Girardeau, MO)
- WDKA channel 49 (MyNetworkTV; Paducah, KY)

The area is served by a regional daily newspaper, The Southern Illinoisan and the university's Daily Egyptian, as well as two weeklies, the Carbondale Times and the Nightlife.

The Southern Illinoisan was formerly headquartered in Carbondale.

== Education ==
Most of Carbondale is in the Carbondale Elementary School District 95. Portions are in the Unity Point Community Consolidated School District 140 and the Giant City Community Consolidated School District 130, also elementary school districts. All of Carbondale is in the Carbondale Community High School District 165.

Southern Illinois University Carbondale is in Carbondale.

== Transportation ==
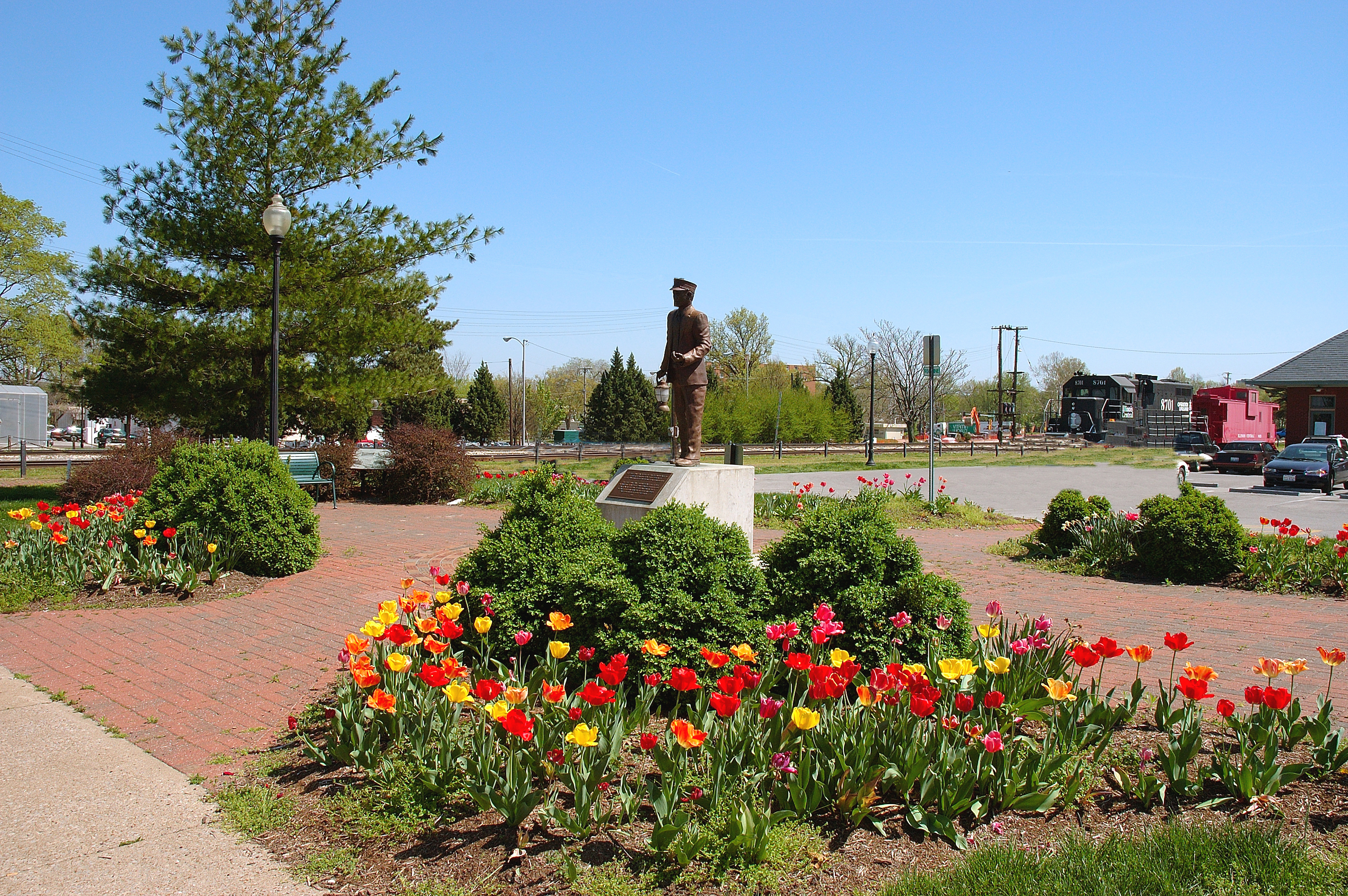
This statue was placed here by Station Carbondale, Inc. through donations from people dedicated to the preservation of Carbondale's railroad history. The first train came to Carbondale on July 4, 1854. At the peak of the city's railroad traffic, as many as 53 passenger trains passed through here each day.

=== Highways ===
The city of Carbondale sits on the intersection of U.S. Route 51 and Illinois Route 13. Interstate 57 is accessible to the east on Route 13 at Marion, and to the south on Rt. 51 near Dongola. Interstate 64 is accessible to the north on Rt. 51. Interstate 24 is accessible six miles south of Marion on I-57. The city is 331 highway miles from Chicago, 96 highway miles from St. Louis, and 213 highway miles from Memphis. (A historical note: When Illinois first developed the state highway system in the 1920s, what is now Rt. 51 was Illinois Route 2, which ran the length of the state).

=== Rail service ===
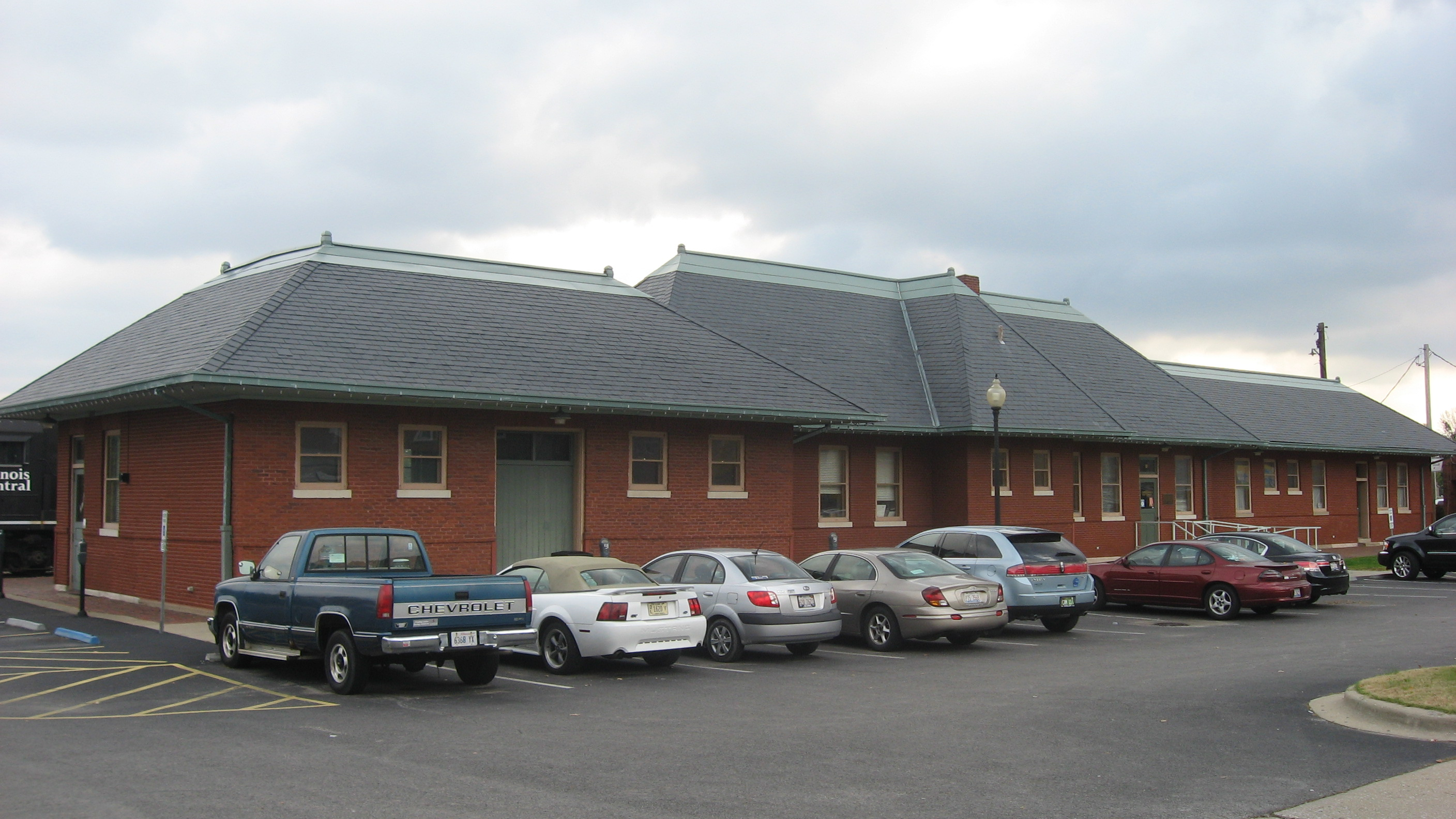
The former Illinois Central Railroad depot in Carbondale

Amtrak Train 59, the southbound City of New Orleans, departs Carbondale daily with service to Memphis, Jackson, and New Orleans (and intermediate stations). Amtrak Train 58, the northbound City of New Orleans, departs Carbondale daily with service to Centralia, Effingham, Mattoon, Champaign-Urbana, Kankakee, Homewood, and Chicago.

Carbondale is also served by Amtrak Train 390/391, the Saluki, daily in the morning, and Amtrak Train 392/393, the Illini, daily in the afternoon/evening. Both the Saluki and the Illini operate to Chicago, originating and terminating in Carbondale.

Amtrak uses the tracks of the Canadian National Railway, which provides freight service to the city's industrial park. The railroad runs along the original line of the Illinois Central Railroad that began service in 1854 in Carbondale.

=== Air service ===
The city is twelve miles (19 km) away from the Williamson County Regional Airport, where American Airlines provides passenger service to Chicago O’Hare.

The Southern Illinois Airport is located northwest of the city and offers private aviation services and is home to SIU's aviation program. On April 2, 2010, state and university officials broke ground on a Transportation Education Center on the airport grounds.

=== Public transit ===
The Saluki Express provides bus service around the city. SIUC students, faculty, and staff, as well as the greater Carbondale community, are encouraged to use the service. This system offers eleven routes operating seven days a week while the university is in session, and a "break route" operating during semester breaks.

Local public transit is also provided by JAX Mass Transit which operates seven days a week, Rides Mass Transit District, which provides bi-hourly service between Carbondale and Marion six days a week, and South Central Transit, which operates a weekday regional service between Pinckneyville, Du Quion, and Carbondale.

== Healthcare ==
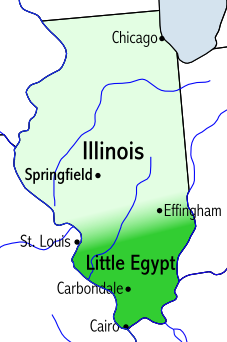
Southern Illinois is near the Southern United States.

Carbondale did not provide abortions from 1985 to 2022, but after the Dobbs v. Jackson Women's Health Organization court ruling in 2022 paved the way for many US states to prohibit abortion, Carbondale experienced a sharp rise in the number of abortion providers thanks to it being the closest town with legal abortion access to many southern U.S. states such as Kentucky, Tennessee, and Mississippi, with the Choices abortion clinic moving there from Memphis, Tennessee.

Carbondale's location in Southern Illinois, south of the Missouri River to the west, and north of the confluence of the Ohio River and the Mississippi River, makes it a central geographic area with close proximity to the Southern United States. Carbondale is along the City of New Orleans train, whose route extends between Chicago and New Orleans.

== Sister cities ==
- Tainai, Niigata, Japan (former town of Nakajo and the city of Carbondale became sister cities in the past)
- Tainan City, Taiwan
- Shimla, Himachal Pradesh, India

== See also ==
- Carbondale Community High School – high school located in Carbondale, Illinois.
