= List of monuments and memorials on the Southern Illinois University Carbondale campus =

The main campus of Southern Illinois University Carbondale contains numerous statues, landmarks, memorials, and other monuments dedicated to or created by former students, staff, and faculty of the university. Many of these artifacts commemorate the deaths and accomplishments of these individuals. Other monuments include commissioned works of art or group memorials, or else landmarks important to the history of the university. Included in this list are many examples of modern sculpture.

Early memorials are often set into the ground and accompanied by a specially planted tree. More modern memorials usually take the form of a bench with an attached plaque. While nearly all of the buildings on the SIU campus are named for individuals associated with the university, very few rooms within these buildings have been dedicated to specific individuals. In many cases, memorials are centered around buildings related to the work of those memorialized. For instance, Philosophy Department faculty memorials are found near the south end of Faner Hall, former home of the SIU Philosophy Department, while memorials to students and faculty of the School of Education are found around Pulliam Hall, historically the site of SIU's Teachers College. The area of campus nicknamed "Old Campus" contains the largest amount of memorials.

The earliest artifact viewable publicly on campus which can be identified dates to 1870, and is the cornerstone of the now-demolished Wheeler Library. The earliest monument dedicated to an individual which can be identified dates to 1950, and was dedicated to William Marberry.

Monuments, Memorials, Statues, and other Works on the SIU-C Campus
Photo(s)	Location on Campus	Type	Dedicatee or Work and Creator	Dedication "Text" or Description	Dedication or Creation Date
	Right of the north entrance to the Student Center	Memorial	Paul Arthur Schilpp	"In Memory of Paul Arthur Schilpp (1897 - 1993) Philosopher and Teacher"	Unknown
	Small garden area and rest bench on the southwest side of Faner Hall	Memorial	Chris Picou-Martin	"Red Sunset Maple In Memory of Chris Picou-Martin 23 Years Service 2004"	2004
	Back side of a large planter on the east side of Faner Hall	Memorial	Willis Moore	"In Memory of Willis Moore (1905 - 1992) Chairman, Philosophy Dept. 1955 - 1973 Member, Board of Trustees 1974 - 1977"	Unknown
	Front side of a large planter on the east side of Faner Hall	Memorial	Alana DeNae' Ross	"In Loving Memory of Alana DeNae' Ross Oct. 4, 1989 Dec. 29, 2008 Beloved Daughter, Sister, Best Friend The Hagler Family"	Unknown
	Front side of a large planter on the east side of Faner Hall	Memorial	John S. Jackson III	"This Garden Honors John S. Jackson III Professor • Dean • Provost • Chancellor 1969 - 2001"	Unknown
	Room 2302 of Faner Hall, Humanities Lounge	Memorial	Betty Lou Hill Mitchell	"Humanities Lounge In Memory of Betty Mitchell"	Unknown
	In front of a tree along W. Grand Avenue north of Altgeld Hall	Memorial	Robert Ridgway	"In Memoriam Robert Ridgway 1850 - 1929"	Unknown
	Near the circle and flagpole where W. Grand Avenue meets S. Normal Avenue	Landmark	Stone Post Remnants	Stone post marking the spot where Grand Avenue once continued onto university grounds. The road was removed over the summer of 1967.	Unknown
	On the northeast side of Woody Hall behind the building near S. Normal Avenue	Memorial	Carla J. Hayes	"In Memory of Carla J. Hayes 1942 - 1990"	Unknown
	Small green space where Lincoln Dr. meets Clocktower Dr.	Landmark	Mill Stones, Historian John Allen	"These stones were transported by boat from St. Louis and put into use by Daniel Harmon Brush, Founder of Carbondale, on this spot of land in the year 1854. They were [...]"	1954
	West side of Wheeler Hall	Memorial	Evelyn W. Jackson	"Pink Dogwood Planted November 2002 In Honor of Evelyn W. Jackson"	2002 November
	Northwest side of Wheeler Hall	Landmark	Bench, Epsilon Beta Sorority	"Presented By Epsilon Beta 1926"	1926
	Northwest side of Wheeler Hall	Memorial	Dr. Hellmut A. Hartwig and Mrs. Beata E. Hartwig	"In Honor Of Dr. Hellmut A. Hartwig & Mrs. Beata E. Hartwig Professor of German 1948 - 1976 and Chairman Foreign Language Departments 1967 - 1972 [...]"	1990 September
	South side of Wheeler Hall	Memorial	Shirley J. McGlinn	"Saucer Magnolia Tree Planted June 2010 In Honor of Shirley J. McGlinn"	2010 June
	Southeast side of Wheeler Hall	Memorial	John T. Williams	"Japanese Snowbell Planted September 1998 In Honor Of John T. Williams"	1998 September
	Behind Wheeler Hall on the east side in front of a large tree	Memorial	William Marberry	"In Memoriam Historic Dawn Redwood Planted 1950 By William Marberry 1913 - 1984"	1950
	Southwest side of Davies Hall	Memorial	Dr. Uma Sekaran	"Dr. Uma Sekaran 1st Director University Women's Professional Advancement 1988 - 1991"	Unknown
	Near the Paul and Virginia Fountain at the center of the Old Campus quad	Memorial	Robert Odaniell and Marilyn Odaniell	"In Honor of 33 Years Service to SIU and the SIU Alumni Association Robert "Bob" Odaniell '51 Association Executive Director 1951 - 1983 and Marilyn Odaniell [...]"	2015 September
	Center of the Old Campus quad on the former site of the Old Main building	Sculpture	Paul and Virginia Fountain, Restored by John Medwedeff	"This is a reproduction of the original Paul and Virginia fountain which had been donated to Southern Illinois Normal University by the Class of 1887. This [...]"	2016 October
	South side of the Old Campus quad	Landmark	Bench, Class of 1938	"Class of 1938"	Unknown
	South side of the Old Campus quad to the north of Anthony Hall	Memorial	Betty Lou Hill Mitchell	"In Honor Of Betty Lou Hill Mitchell Professor Of English 1949 - 1997"	Unknown
	Center of Old Campus quad in front of Shryock Auditorium	Sculpture	Delyte W. Morris Statue, Sculptor Fredda Brilliant	"Delyte W. Morris 1907 - 1982 President, Southern Illinois University 1948 - 1970 Presented by Southern Illinois University Foundation Sculptor Fredda Brilliant"	Unknown
	Walkway in front of Shryock Auditorium	Landmark	Old Main Medallion	"Decorative Medallion - original artifact From OLD MAIN building Destroyed by fire in 1969"	Unknown
	Left side of the main entryway in Shryock Auditorium	Dedication	Lecture Memorial, Senior Class of 1933	"In commemoration of the first public lecture in this auditorium April 4, 1918 A great world war address supporting the policies of President Woodrow Wilson delivered by [...]"	1933
	Right side of the main entryway in Shryock Auditorium	Memorial	Henry William Shryock	"In Memoriam Henry William Shryock 1913 - 1935 President of Southern Illinois State Normal University Class of 1935"	1935
	At the end of the foyer in Shryock Auditorium	Memorial	WWI Memorial	"Men of the Southern Illinois State Normal University who answered their country's call • Roll of Honor • [...]"	1920
	Northeast side of the Old Main quad	Memorial	Rhonda Seebee	"In Memory of Rhonda Seebee 30 Years of Service School of Medicine"	Unknown
	Northeast side of the Old Main quad to the northeast of Altgeld Hall alongside W. Grand Avenue	Memorial	Gladys Kell Hay	"Gladys Kell Hay Class of 1918"	Unknown
	Dorothy Morris Gardens at the north side of Faner Hall behind the University Museum	Dedication	Dorothy Morris Gardens, Chief Designers Karen Stoelzle Midden and Bruce Francis	"Many talented individuals made possible the creation of the Dorothy Morris Gardens • The Gardens were designed by Karen Stoelzle Midden [...]"	1997
	Dorothy Morris Gardens at the north side of Faner Hall behind the University Museum	Dedication	Dorothy Morris Gardens, Sponsors	"Dorothy Morris Gardens Sponsors Anny Nursery Co., W. Clark and Rhoda Ashby, Lana and Harold Bardo [...]"	Unknown
	Dorothy Morris Gardens at the north side of Faner Hall behind the University Museum	Dedication	Fifty Year Commemorative Medallions	"Fifty Year Commemorative. Delyte W. Morris President Southern Illinois University 1948 - 1970 1948 - 1998. Delyte Wesley Morris [...]"	1998
	Dorothy Morris Gardens at the north side of Faner Hall behind the University Museum	Sculpture	Dorothy Mayo Morris statue, Sculptor Erin Palmer	"Dorothy Mayo Morris. Mrs. Morris served as Southern Illinois University's First Lady from 1948 to 1971 during the tenure of her husband, Southern [...]"	2001
	Dorothy Morris Gardens at the north side of Faner Hall behind the University Museum	Memorial	W. Clark and Rhoda Ashby	"W. Clark and Rhoda Ashby"	Unknown
	Dorothy Morris Gardens at the north side of Faner Hall behind the University Museum	Memorial	Charles T. Goss	"In Memory Of Charles T. Goss By Mary And The Children, Barbara, Brad and David"	Unknown
	Dorothy Morris Gardens at the north side of Faner Hall behind the University Museum	Memorial	Emma K. Simonds	"In Honor Of Emma K. Simonds"	Unknown
	Dorothy Morris Gardens at the north side of Faner Hall behind the University Museum	Memorial	Senator John and Helen Gilbert	"In Memory Of Senator John and Helen Gilbert"	Unknown
	Dorothy Morris Gardens at the north side of Faner Hall behind the University Museum	Memorial	Delyte W. Morris and Eugene T. Simonds	"In Memory Of Delyte W. Morris And Eugene T. Simonds"	Unknown
	Dorothy Morris Gardens at the north side of Faner Hall behind the University Museum	Dedication	James and Peggy Fornear	"Fornear Water Garden James and Peggy Fornear"	Unknown
	Dorothy Morris Gardens at the north side of Faner Hall behind the University Museum	Dedication	Troutt Tea House, Kenny and Lisa Troutt	"Troutt Tea House In Honor Of Dorothy Mayo Morris by Kenny and Lisa Troutt"	Unknown
	Sculpture Garden at the north side of Faner Hall behind the University Museum	Sculpture	Terrasecretasaurus, Sculptor Robert Michelmann	"Robert Michelmann Terrasecretasaurus, 1992 aluminum Gift of the Artist"	1992
	Sculpture Garden at the north side of Faner Hall behind the University Museum	Sculpture	AV-Yellow Lozenger, Sculptor Ernest Trova	"Ernest Trova Av-Yellow Lozenger, 1977 cor-ten steel Anonymous Donor"	1977
	Sculpture Garden at the north side of Faner Hall behind the University Museum	Sculpture	Starwalk, Sculptor Richard Hunt	"Richard Hunt Starwalk, 1984 bronze, welded sheets Museum Purchase"	1984
	Sculpture Garden at the north side of Faner Hall behind the University Museum	Sculpture	Untitled, Sculptor Kent Hilgenbrink	"Kent Hilgenbrinck Untitle, 1983 cor-ten steel Rickert-Ziebold Trust Award Winner, 1983 Gift of the Artist"	1983
	Sculpture Garden at the north side of Faner Hall behind the University Museum	Sculpture	Oval Forest Nest, Sculptor Dan Johnson	"Dan Johnson Oval Forest Nest, 1997 steel "Seat Art" Competition Winner, 1997"	1997
	Sculpture Garden at the north side of Faner Hall behind the University Museum	Sculpture	AV-A-7, Sculptor Ernest Trova	"Ernest Trova AV-A-7, 1977 cor-ten steel Anonymous Donor"	1977
	Sculpture Garden at the north side of Faner Hall behind the University Museum	Sculpture	The Worm, Sculptor Colby Parsons-O'Keefe	"Colby Parsons-O'Keefe The Worm, 1977 ceramic "Seat Art" Competition Winner, 1997"	1997
	Sculpture Garden at the north side of Faner Hall behind the University Museum	Sculpture	Untitled, Sculptor Aldon Addington	"Aldon Addington Untitled, 1997 steel-forged, welded Gift of the Artist"	1997
	Sculpture Garden at the north side of Faner Hall behind the University Museum	Sculpture	Thunderstone Blue, Sculptor Michael Dunbar	"Michael Dunbar 'Thunderstone Blue' Painted Welded Steel 1988 Purchased By University Museum Associates"	1988
	North side of Parkinson Laboratory between Parkinson and the Allyn Building	Landmark	Parkinson Dinosaur Footprints	"Dinosaur Footprints" leading to the Parkinson Laboratory, home of the SIU Geology Department.	Unknown
	Near the west entrance to the Allyn Building	Sculpture	Unknown	A small concrete sculpture at the back entrance to the Allyn Building.	Unknown
	Outside Wheeler Hall (Photo 1) and Morris Library (Photo 2)	Landmark	Sidewalk Remnants	Examples of the earlier style of sidewalk still present on campus.	1920s circa
	Sidewalk on the northwest side of Morris Library	Memorial	Willie Jim Slaughter	"In Memory Of Willie 'Jim' Jimbo Slaughter 1937 - 1968 Husband, Father, Son, Brother, Friend and Neighbor Who lost his life during the construction of [...]"	Unknown
	Northwest side of Morris Library	Sculpture	Untitled, Sculptor Paul McCormick	"Class Gift 1993 Paul McCormick Sculptor Brad Cole Student Body President"	1993
	On a grassy knoll in the middle of a green space between Morris Library and the Wham Education Building	Sculpture	Here, Sculptor Nicholas Vergette	" 'Here' 1974 by Nicholas Vergette Professor of Art SIU 1960 - 1974"	1974
	At the end of W. Grand Avenue to the northwest of the Morris Library parking lot	Memorial	Harlyn Beckman	"In Remembrance of Harlyn Beckman Grounds Foreman 1987 - 2008"	Unknown
	Along W. Grand Avenue to the north of the Morris Library parking lot	Landmark	Bench, the University School	"University School 1951 - 1968"	Unknown
	In the large green space to the south of Pulliam Hall	Memorial	Elena M. Sliepcevich	"Elena M Sliepcevich* Centre For Health Education Studies Founded 2008 At SIUC As A Tribute To "Dr. S" Provides Opportunities And Resources [...]"	2021
	In the large green space to the south of Pulliam Hall	Memorial	Judy C. Drolet	"Judy C Drolet, PHD, CHES, FASHA, FAAHE SIU Professor Of Health Education 1982 - 2008 Founding Director, Elena M Sliepcevich Center [...]"	2021
	In the large green space to the south of Pulliam Hall underneath a large tree	Memorial	Dr. Charles B. Klasek	"If you have a purpose in which you believe there's no end to the amount of things you can accomplish -- Dedicated to the life and spirit of Dr. [...]"	Unknown
	In the large green space to the south of Pulliam Hall	Memorial	Douglas N. McEwen	"In honor of Douglas N. McEwen SIUC Recreation Professor 1975 - 2022 'Tell me what a person does when they have nothing they have [...]"	Unknown
	In the large green space to the south of Pulliam Hall near a sidewalk leading to the Pulliam Hall south entrance	Memorial	Eileen Zunich	"In Honor Of Eileen Zunich SIUC Health Education Assistant Professor 1970 - 1992"	Unknown
	In the large green space to the south of Pulliam Hall near a sidewalk leading to the Pulliam Hall south entrance	Memorial	Katie Mitchell	"In Memory Of Katie Mitchell 1976 - 1999 Former SIUC Student 'What Is Lovely Never Dies But Passes Into Other Loveliness"	Unknown
	On the southeast side of Pulliam Hall near the southeast main entrance	Memorial / Sculpture	Memorial to the Victims of the Great Tornado of March 18, 1925, Sculptor William Youngman	"The sculpture on permanent display at this site was purchased by the Art-in-Architecture Program of the Capital Development [...]"	1991
	South of the Wham Education Building outside the main underpass	Memorial	Dr. Barbara Cordoni	"In Memory of Barbara Cordoni, Ph.D. 1933 - 2004 Founder, Achieve Program"	Unknown
	South of the Wham Education Building outside the main underpass	Memorial	Dr. Fred A. Sloan, Jr.	"In Memory of Fred A. Sloan, JR., Ph.D. Professor of Education 1968 - 1992 Rotarian 1969 - 2008"	Unknown
	Southeast corner of the Morris Library parking lot to the northeast of Morris Library	Memorial	Deb Morrow	"Women's Studies In Memory of Deb Morrow September 28, 1955 - July 20, 2004"	Unknown
	On a grassy knoll in the middle of a green space between Morris Library and the Wham Education Building to the southeast of the Here sculpture	Memorial	Cindy Cunningham	"In Memory Of Cindy Cunningham -- Sometimes When Living Is No Longer Possible, Death Can Be A Sharing Experience And [...]"	1981
	Between Pulliam Hall and Woody Hall	Sculpture	Forever Saluki, Sculptors John Medwedeff and Megan Robin-Abbott	"To celebrate Southern Illinois University's 150th anniversary and its rich and storied history, the SIU Alumni Association created the Saluki Alumni [...]"	2019
	East side of Lawson Hall along a sidewalk	Memorial	Walter L. Sipple, Jr.	"Foster Holly Planted December 2004 In Honor of Walter L. Sipple, JR."	2004 December
	Between the Life Science II building and the Life Science III building	Sculpture	Mitotic Geometry, Sculptor Christiane T. Martens	"Christiane T. Martens 'Mitotic Geometry' 1995 Commissioned by the Art-in-Architecture Program Capital Development Board [...]"	1995
	Between the Life Science II building and the Life Science III building	Memorial	Ronald A. Browning	"Southern Magnolia In Honor of Ronald A. Browning June 2009"	2009 June
	Southwest side of Morris Library to the west of the back entrance	Memorial	Nancy A. Martin	"In Memory Of Nancy A. Martin '76 College of Science Development Officer in the Division of Institutional Advancement"	Unknown
	Southeast corner of Morris Library	Landmark	Morris Library Plaza Architectural Memorials	A series of informational plaques related to Wheeler Library, Morris Library, The Normal Building, and Old Main	Unknown
	Southeast corner of Morris Library	Dedication	Memorial and Donor Bricks	n/a	Unknown
	Southeast corner of Morris Library	Dedication	Tom and Tommye Pace	"Tom and Tommye Pace"	Unknown
	Southeast corner of Morris Library	Memorial	Neal McGraw	"In loving memory of her beloved twin brother Neal 3/29/44 - 9/29/52 Gail McGraw"	Unknown
	Southeast corner of Morris Library	Dedication	Rob and Melissa Jensen	"Rob and Melissa Jensen"	Unknown
	Southeast corner of Morris Library	Dedication	Ellen and Frederick Chiu	"Ellen & Frederick Chiu"	Unknown
	Southeast corner of Morris Library	Memorial	W.G. McCracken	"Given by Haline M. Carlton (1938) In Memory of her father W.G. McCracken"	Unknown
	Southeast corner of Morris Library	Memorial	Valerie Brew-Parrish	"A true Saluki, who found inspiration, love & courage at SIUC. Valerie Brew-Parrish"	Unknown
	Southeast corner of Morris Library	Dedication	Herb and Carolyn Donow	"Herb & Carolyn Donow"	Unknown
	Southeast corner of Morris Library	Memorial	Dr. Elmer H. Johnson	"In Memory of Dr. Elmer H. Johnson International Criminologist SIU CCJ 1966 - 2008"	Unknown
	Southeast corner of Morris Library	Memorial	Claude and Hazel Coleman	"Remembering Claude and Hazel Coleman who served the University 1945 - 1967"	Unknown
	Southeast corner of Morris Library	Dedication	Glenn and Jo Poshard	"Glenn and Jo Poshard"	Unknown
	Southeast corner of Morris Library	Memorial	Tom Cokins	"In Memory of Tom 'TC' Cokins from his friends [...]"	Unknown
	On the concrete walkway along the back of Faner Hall behind trees in the Dorothy Morris Gardens	Sculpture	Eternal Marriage vs. 'Til Death Do Us Part, Sculptor Kara Nasca	"Kara Nasca Eternal Marriage vs. 'Til Death Do Us Part, 1983 copper, rocks Gift of Mr. and Mrs. Richard Nasca"	1983
	Plaza at the front of the Student Center	Dedication	Seymour Bryson	"Seymour Bryson Plaza Named in recognition and honor of his outstanding service and devotion during a career spanning more [...]"	2014 September
	Garden to the right of the front of the Student Center	Memorial	Ronald B. Siddens	"In Memory of Ron 'The Baker' Ronald B. Siddens 1941 - 1997"	Unknown
	Front of the Banterra Center on the east side	Memorial	Ira Dugan Tripp, Jr.	"Ira Dugan Tripp, JR. 1967 - 2020 SIU Employee Grounds Department Telephone Service 2004 - 2020 Loved God, His Family and the Salukis [...]"	Unknown
	Central circle between the Banterra Center, Banterra Center parking lot, and Saluki Stadium	Landmark	King Tut	"King Tut May 1954 SIU Engineering Club 1961"	1961
	Southeast side of the Engineering Building along the sidewalk between the Engineering Building and the Becker Pavilion boat dock	Memorial	Ajay Puri	"Ajay Puri Beloved Son, Brother and Husband 2006"	2006
	Landscape in front of the Becker Pavilion boat dock	Dedication	Laurie Acenbach	"This unique boulder landscape was made possible through the generosity of Laurie Achenbach Dean, College of Science 2014 - 2017"	Unknown
	Sidewalk to the northwest of the Becker Pavilion boat dock	Memorial	Dr. Donald L. Beggs	"Treasured Memories of Dr. Donald L. Beggs '63, '64 Retired Chancellor 1996 - 1998 Dean COEHS 1981 - 1996 Professor 1966 - 1998 and [...]"	Unknown
	On the eastern wall of the Becker Pavilion boat dock	Dedication	Charles C. Hines	"This Plaza Is Named In Honor Of Charles C. Hines Class Of 1954"	Unknown
	Further along the sidewalk to the northwest of the Becker Pavilion boat dock	Memorial	Dana Lynn Steele-MacCrimmon	"Dana Lynn Steele-MacCrimmon 1960 - 2006 Student - Mom - Firefighter 'Someday I'll Wish Upon A Star And Wake Up Where The Clouds Are [...]"	Unknown
	West of the Engineering Building and the Becker Pavilion boat dock near the entrance to a peninsula on Campus Lake	Memorial	Pyramid Apartment Fire Memorial	"In Memory Of Those Who Died In The Pyramid Apartment Fire On December 6, 1992. The World Will Never Know What Their Young Lives [...]"	Unknown
	Behind Lentz Hall along a sidewalk by Campus Lake	Memorial	Joe McMonagle	"A man of conviction not convention A warrior not a soldier A loving son Joe McMonagle RHD ACsE 2007"	2007
	Southwest of Lentz Hall between Lentz and Pierce Halls	Memorial	Alex J. Booth	"In Memory Of Alex J. Booth 1988 - 2007 From Faculty and Staff of The College of Engineering"	Unknown
	In the green space between Lentz and Bailey Halls	Memorial	John Heenan	"In Memory of John Heenan 1982 - 2002"	Unknown
	Southwest side of the Agriculture Building	Memorial	Dr. George Kapusta	"This Outdoor Space Is Dedicated To Honor An In Memory Of Dr. George Kapusta. Dr. Kapusta Was A Professor Of Weed Science And [...]"	Unknown
	West side of the Agriculture Building outside the underpass and below a large tree	Memorial	Jason A. Jackson	"In Memory Of Jason A. Jackson Department Of Forestry October 14, 1989"	1989 October
	Bench space behind the Agriculture Building on the northeast side	Memorial	Michael Wolff	"In Memory of Michael Wolff Class of 1996"	Unknown
	Bench space behind the Agriculture Building on the northeast side	Memorial	Kara Gruenenfelder	"Kara Gruenenfelder 1983 - 2005"	Unknown
	Bench space behind the Agriculture Building on the northeast side	Memorial	Thomas R. Odonnel	"In Memory Of Thomas R. Odonnel Plant and Soil Science Class Of 1984"	Unknown
	Fulkerson Hall in the Small Group Housing area north of Thompson Point	Landmark	Fulkerson Hall Architectural Notice	"Fulkerson Hall 1960 William G. Stratton / Governor Board of Trustees John F. Wham, Kenneth L. Davis, Harold R. Fischer, Melvin [...]"	1960
	Entrance to the Small Group Housing area north of Thompson point	Dedication	Small Group Housing Dedication	"Southern Illinois University Small Group Housing Dedicated May 26, 1959 'Man Must Belong And Create If He Searches For Truth, For [...]"	1959 May
	Entrance to the Small Group Housing area north of Thompson point	Landmark	Small Group Housing Greek Graffiti	"PHI S _ _ . ΦΣ _"	Unknown
	Northwest corner of Campus Lake between the Small Group Housing area and Thompson Point	Landmark	Turtle Log	A well-known landmark to visitors to the Campus Lake Trail, as well as those students who live at Thompson Point.	Unknown
	Along the Campus Lake Trail on the northwest side directly east of Salter Hall	Memorial	Terri Barrett	"In Memory Of Terri Barrett I Left Her At The Train Station But She Still Spent 53 Years As My Loving Wife - Dick Barrett '66"	Unknown
	Morava Point on the Campus Lake Trail on the northwest side of the lake	Memorial	Morava Point Memorials	A Trifecta of memorials to Gary D. Morava, Frank Kleas Schmitz, and William T. 'Bill' Meade	Unknown
	At the end of Morava Point on the Campus Lake Trail on the west side of the lake	Memorial	Jill T. Gobert	"In Loving Memory Jill T. Gobert B.S. 1990 MBA 1998"	2022
	Along the Campus Lake Trail on the west side of the lake	Memorial	James and Shirley Thomas	"In Memory of James and Shirley Thomas Quiln, MO"	Unknown
	In front of the Life Science III building	Sculpture	Vigorae, Sculptor Gene Horvath	"Gene Horvath 'Vigorae' 1996 Commissioned by the Art-in-Architecture Program Capital Development Board Jim Edgar [...]"	1996
	Northeast side of the Communications Building outside a small green space	Memorial	Ryan Michael Rendleman	"In Memory Of Ryan Michael Rendleman 1985 - 2008 Photojournalist, Daily Egyptian SIUC Class of 2008 Devout Christian [...]"	Unknown
	Northeast side of the Communications inside a small green space	Memorial	Dr. Leo Garwin	"In Memory Of Dr. Leo Garwin WSIU Friends Board"	Unknown
	Northeast side of the Communications inside a small green space	Dedication	Ralph E. Becker Obelisk of Honor	"CMCMA Honor Rolle of Donors [...]	Unknown
	Southwest side of the Hiram Lesar Law Building	Memorial	Howard B. Eisenberg	"In Memoriam Howard B. Eisenberg 1946 - 2002 Legal Clinic Director 1988 - 1991 The Best Lawyer Money Couldn't Buy"	Unknown
	Southwest side of the Hiram Lesar Law Building	Memorial	Todd S. Josefson	In Memory Of Todd S. Josefson August 25, 1978 - June 20, 2004 We will always remember him as our classmate and colleague, but [...]	Unknown
	West side of the Hiram Lesar Law Building	Sculpture	Reaper, Sculptor Scott M. Wallace	"Scott M. Wallace 'Reaper' 1983 Commissioned by the Illinois % [sic] for Art Program Capital Development Board James R. [...]"	1983
	Northeast side of the Hiram Lesar Law Building	Sculpture	Bridge 5, Sculptor Edward McCullough	"Edward McCullough 'Bridge 5' 1983 Commissioned by the Illinois % [sic] for Art Program Capital Development Board James R. [...]	1983
	East side of the Hiram Lesar Law Building	Memorial	Elizabeth A. Leenig	"In Memoriam Elizabeth A. Leenig 1950 - 2002 School of Law Business Manager 1988 - 2002 'Betsy's Garden' "	Unknown
	South face of the Hiram Lesar Law Building near the main entrance	Landmark	Law School Inscription	"Justice Is A Human Enterprise, Anonymous, The Life Of The Law Has Not Been Logic It Has Been Experience, Oliver Wendell [...]"	Unknown
	South side of the Campus Lake near the west of the Nature Observatory	Memorial	Dr. Charles C. Myers and Joyce A. Myers	" 'You are leaving here better than you came.' Dr. Charles C. Myers Department of Forestry Southern Illinois University (1973 - 1995) and his [...]"	Unknown
	Inner plaza of the Engineering Building	Landmark	Sculptures of the Engineering Building Plaza	n/a	Unknown
	South side of the Engineering Building	Dedication	Ernest J. and Mary C. Simon	"Ernest J. And Mary C. Simon Terrace Dedicated May 2, 2003"	2003 May
	North of the Banterra Center along a sidewalk	Memorial	Anne Coleman	"In Memory Of Anne Coleman Dental Hygiene Student 2001"	2001
	North of the Banterra Center along a sidewalk	Memorial	Jim Wilkinson	"In Memory Of Jim Wilkinson A Champion Wrestling Coach"	Unknown
	North of the Banterra Center along a sidewalk	Memorial	Gary Lee Auld	"In Loving Memory Of Gary Lee Auld 1949 - 2007 Forever A Saluki Forever In Our Hearts"	Unknown
	North of the Engineering Building	Sculpture	Momentum, Sculptor Jeff Medwedeff	" 'Momentum' 2004 J. Medwedeff Medwedeff Forge & Design Studio: M. Haugh, A.M. Rieckenberg C. Roth, J. Schulyer, J. Waar"	2004
	North of the Engineering Building near the main entrance	Memorial	Dr. Glafkos D. Galanos	"In Loving Memory Of Dr. Glafkos D. Galanos December 9, 1948 - April 11, 2021 Quarter Century Of Leadership Chair, Dept. Of Electrical & [...]"	Unknown
	North of the Engineering Building near the main entrance	Sculpture	Illinois Epsilon Monument	"Illinois Epsilon"	Unknown
	Right side of the main entrance to Pulliam Hall on its south side	Landmark	Pulliam Hall Inscription	"So Enter- That Daily Thous Mayest Become More Learned And Thoughtful So Depart- That Daily Thou Mayest Become More Useful To Thy [...]"	Unknown
	Inside of Faner Hall near the north end of the building on the first floor	Memorial	Harry T. Moore	"Moore Lecture Hall Harry T. Moore 1908 - 1981 'The Intelligent Heart' Distinguished Research Professor SIUC Internationally-honored [...]"	Unknown
	North side of the Wham Education Building to the right of the underpass	Memorial	Michael G. Smart	"In Memory of Our Friend, Michael G. Smart"	Unknown
	On the overpass connecting the Southern Hills housing area to the main campus	Memorial	Susan Schumake	"Susan Schumake Memorial Overpass"	Unknown
	South of the Brush Towers housing area along Logan Drive	Landmark	WDIB Student Radio Station Marker	"On this site WIDB Student Radio Station began operations on April 12, 1970, from the student built studios in the basement of the [...]"	2020
	Outside the north entrance of the Student Recreation Center	Memorial	Scott A. Miller	"In Memory of Scott A. Miller 1949 - 2020 Beloved husband, father, grandfather and friend A man of many passions [...]"	Unknown
	Along the Campus Lake path east of the Campus Lake Boat Dock	Memorial	George Garoian	"In Memory of George Garoian 1927 - 2005"	Unknown
	North of Lingle Hall near the Banterra Center underneath a tree	Memorial	Matthew Karl Meier	"In Memory Of Matthew Karl Meier 1968 - 1996 Saluki Football 1987 - 1992 Faith-Family-Friendship-Fortitude-Future"	Unknown
	Inside the Neckers Building along the northern walkway of the auditorium spaces	Memorial	Boris Musulin	"Boris Musulin Memorial Reading Room Professor of Chemistry 1956-1973 Theoretical chemist, tireless worker for the principles of the Illinois Academy of Sci [...]"	1976, April 6
	Along the sidewalk west of the Agriculture Building, toward the north side of the building	Memorial	John H. Burde III	"John H. Burde, III, Ph.D., Professor, Recreation Management SIUC - Department of Forestry Commemorating 32 Years of Service 1974-2006 [...]"	Unknown
	Northeast of the Parkinson Laboratory, in a green space before the stump of a cut-down tree	Memorial	John Utgaard	"In Loving Memory of John Utgaard Professor of Geology, 1965-2003 Planted in 2010 by Southern Illinois Audubon Society"	2010
	North of Parkinson Laboratory along a sidewalk before a small tree	Memorial	Robert (bob) McGlinn	"Special Thanks to Robert (Bob) McGlinn For his 28 years of service Department of Computer Science"	Unknown
	Between the Student Center and Neckers Building along a sidewalk west of the Amphitheater	Memorial	Linz C. Brown	"In Memory of Linz C. Brown Rotarian, Scholar, Ambassador and Friend	Unknown
	Southwest of the Neckers Building along a sidewalk by the parking lot before a large pine tree	Memorial	Wilbur C. McDaniel	"Wilbur C. McDaniel 1910 - 1993 Math Dept. CHM. 1947 - 1960	Unknown
	Unknown	Memorial	Brian Fitzgerald Chesson	"Bur Oak Dedicated In The Memory Of Brian Fitzgerald Chesson "Stein" October 7, 2000"	2000, October 7
	West of the Agriculture Building in a large green space in front of a small tree	Memorial	Cooper Woods	"In Memory of Cooper Woods Forestry Class of 2018 His time at SIU and as a member of the Forestry Club turned friends to family. We gathered here on [...]"	2020, October 30
