= Harvard Mineralogical Museum =

Mineralogy museum at Harvard University

Coordinates: 42°22′41.95″N 71°6′56.05″W

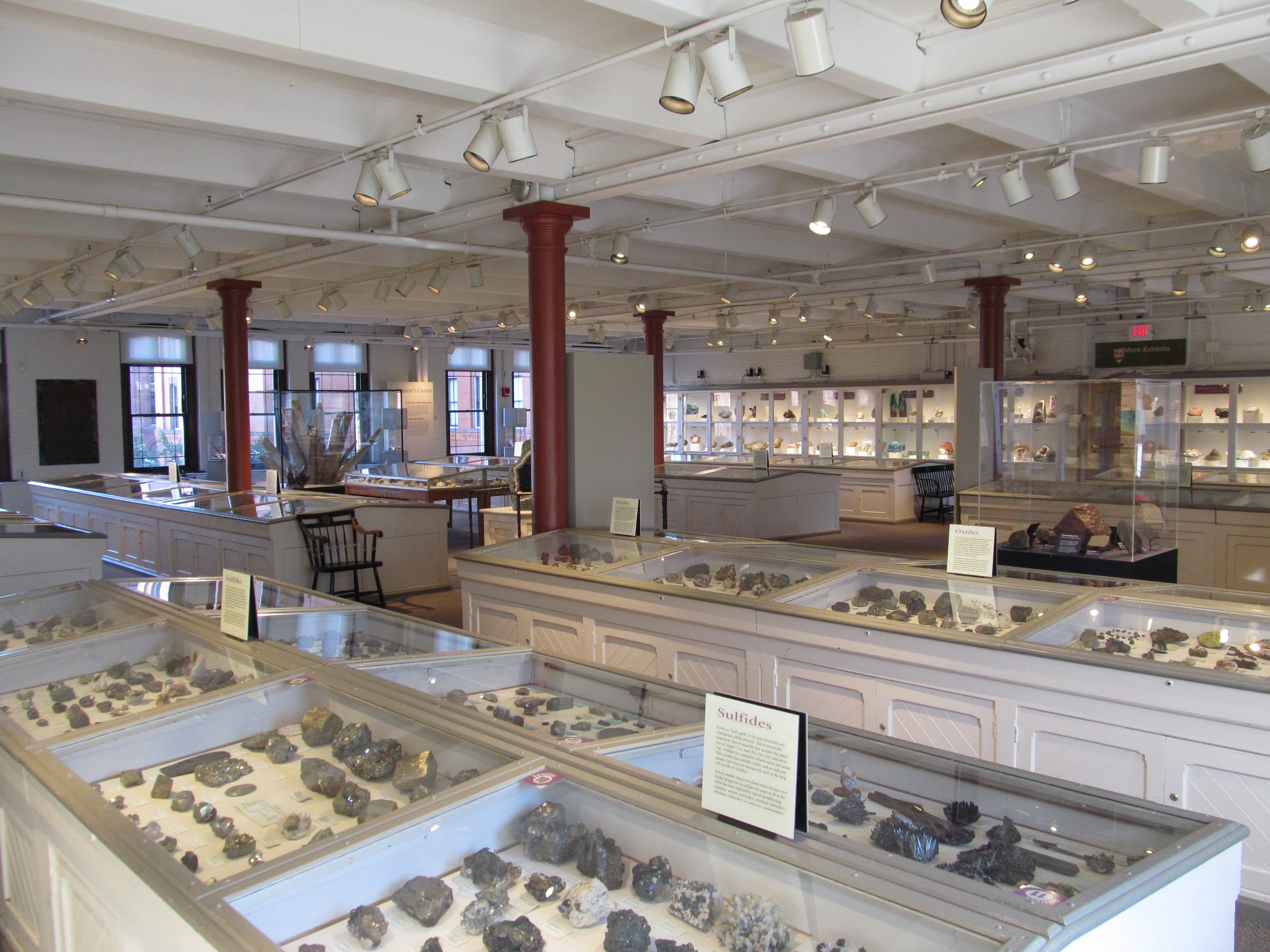
Harvard Mineralogical Museum in January 2012

The Mineralogical and Geological Museum at Harvard (MGMH), or the Harvard Mineralogical Museum, is located on the campus of Harvard University in Cambridge, Massachusetts. It is one of the three research museums which collectively comprise the collection of the Harvard Museum of Natural History.

== History ==
Harvard professor Louis Agassiz oversaw the construction of the University Museum building to house a museum of comparative zoology; the building was completed in 1859. Its collections soon expanded beyond comparative zoology into other natural sciences. In 1901, Alexander Agassiz, son of Louis Agassiz, formally established a Geological Museum. In 1966, the Mineralogical Museum (formed separately) and the Geological Museum merged.

== Collection ==
The museum's collection is the oldest University collection in the country. It was established by Benjamin Waterhouse, co-founder of and professor at Harvard Medical School, in 1784. In 1805, the collection held 1,600 specimens. Today, the museum holds 400,000 specimens.
