= Harvard Museum of Natural History =

Natural history museum in Massachusetts

Coordinates: 42°22′42.29″N 71°6′55.99″W

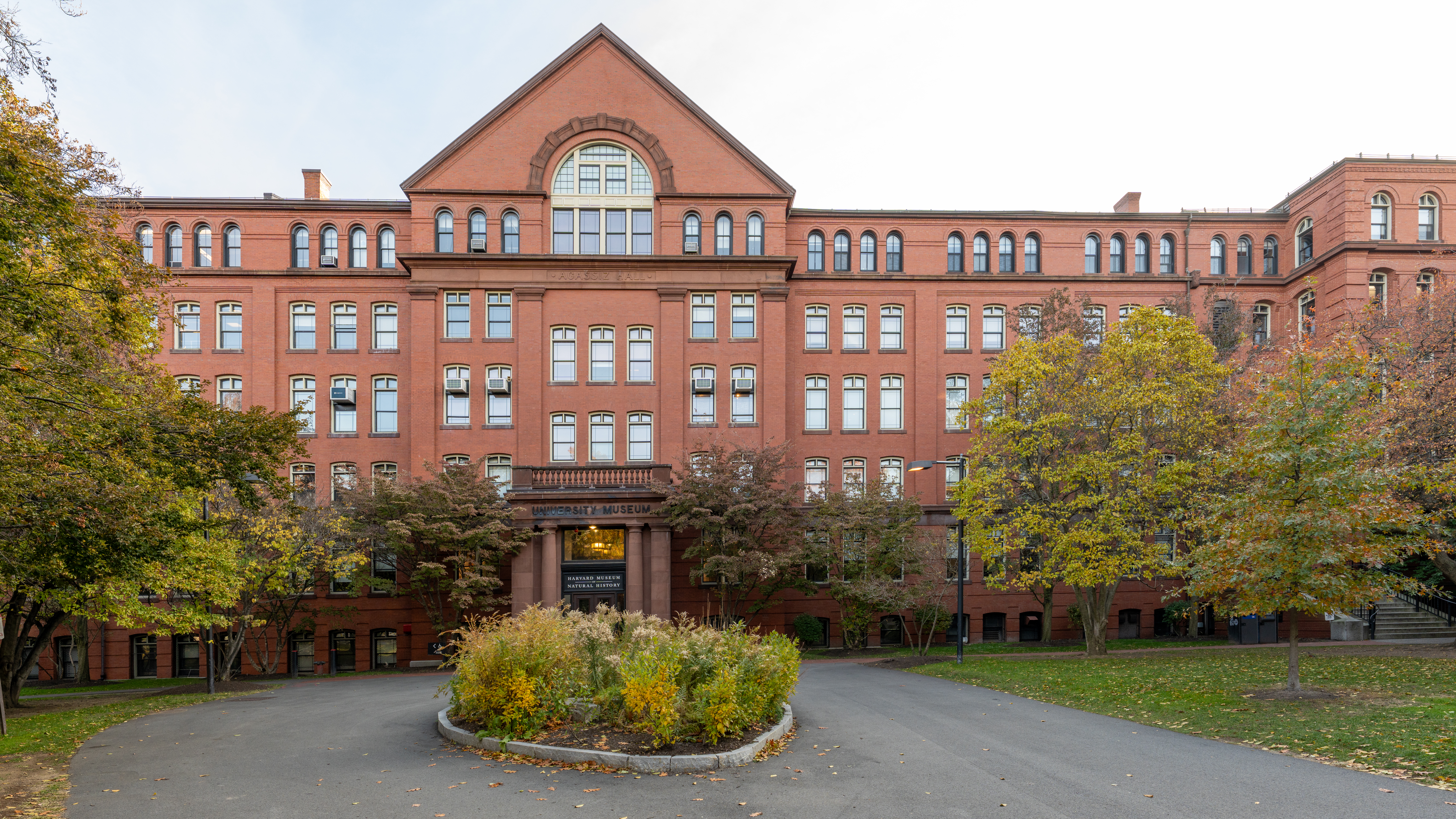

- Location within Boston Location within Massachusetts Location within the United States
- Established: 1998 (by merger of 3 earlier museums)
- Location: 26 Oxford Street, Cambridge, Massachusetts 02138
- Collection size: 12,000
- Visitors: 210,000 (2013)
- Owner: Harvard University
- Public transit access: Harvard (MBTA Red Line)
- Website: hmnh.harvard.edu

The Harvard Museum of Natural History (HMNH) is a natural history museum housed in the University Museum Building, located on the campus of Harvard University in Cambridge, Massachusetts. It features 16 galleries with 12,000 specimens drawn from the collections of the university's three natural history research museums: the Harvard University Herbaria, the Museum of Comparative Zoology, and the Harvard Mineralogical Museum.

The museum is physically connected to the Peabody Museum of Archaeology and Ethnology at 26 Oxford Street. One admission grants visitors access to both museums. In 2012, Harvard formed a new consortium, the Harvard Museums of Science and Culture, whose members are the Harvard Museum of Natural History, the Harvard Museum of the Ancient Near East, the Peabody Museum, and the Collection of Historical Scientific Instruments.

== Exhibits ==
The Harvard Museum of Natural History was created in 1998 as the "public face" of three research museums—the Museum of Comparative Zoology, the Harvard Mineralogical and Geological Museum, and the Harvard University Herbaria. Its exhibitions draw on Harvard University's natural history collections. Harvard's research faculty provides expertise and programs for members and the general public provide an exchange of information and ideas.

In the museum's permanent galleries, visitors encounter the diversity of life on Earth, from dinosaurs to fossil invertebrates and reptiles, to large mammals, birds and fish, and the only mounted Kronosaurus. The mineralogical galleries present a systematic display of meteorites, minerals and gemstones. The galleries also house the historic Ware Collection of Blaschka Glass Models of Plants, popularly known as the Glass Flowers, and the exhibit Sea Creatures in Glass, displaying some of the Harvard Museum of Comparative Zoology's collection of the Blaschka models of marine invertebrates. In addition, a series of changing exhibitions bring focus to new research at the university.

== Operations ==
The museum is member-based, with over 3,200 current members, primarily from the Boston metropolitan area. While the museum is affiliated with the Harvard's Faculty of Arts and Sciences and receives important support from the university, it derives most of its operating income from admissions, membership, gifts, and programmatic revenues. With more than 210,000 visitors in 2013, the Harvard Museum of Natural History is the university's most-visited museum.

The museum offers educational programs and has a partnership with Cambridge public schools; offers public lectures by Harvard biologists, international conservationists, and popular authors; and has a travel program where small groups are led by Harvard science faculty to biodiverse locations.

== Gallery ==
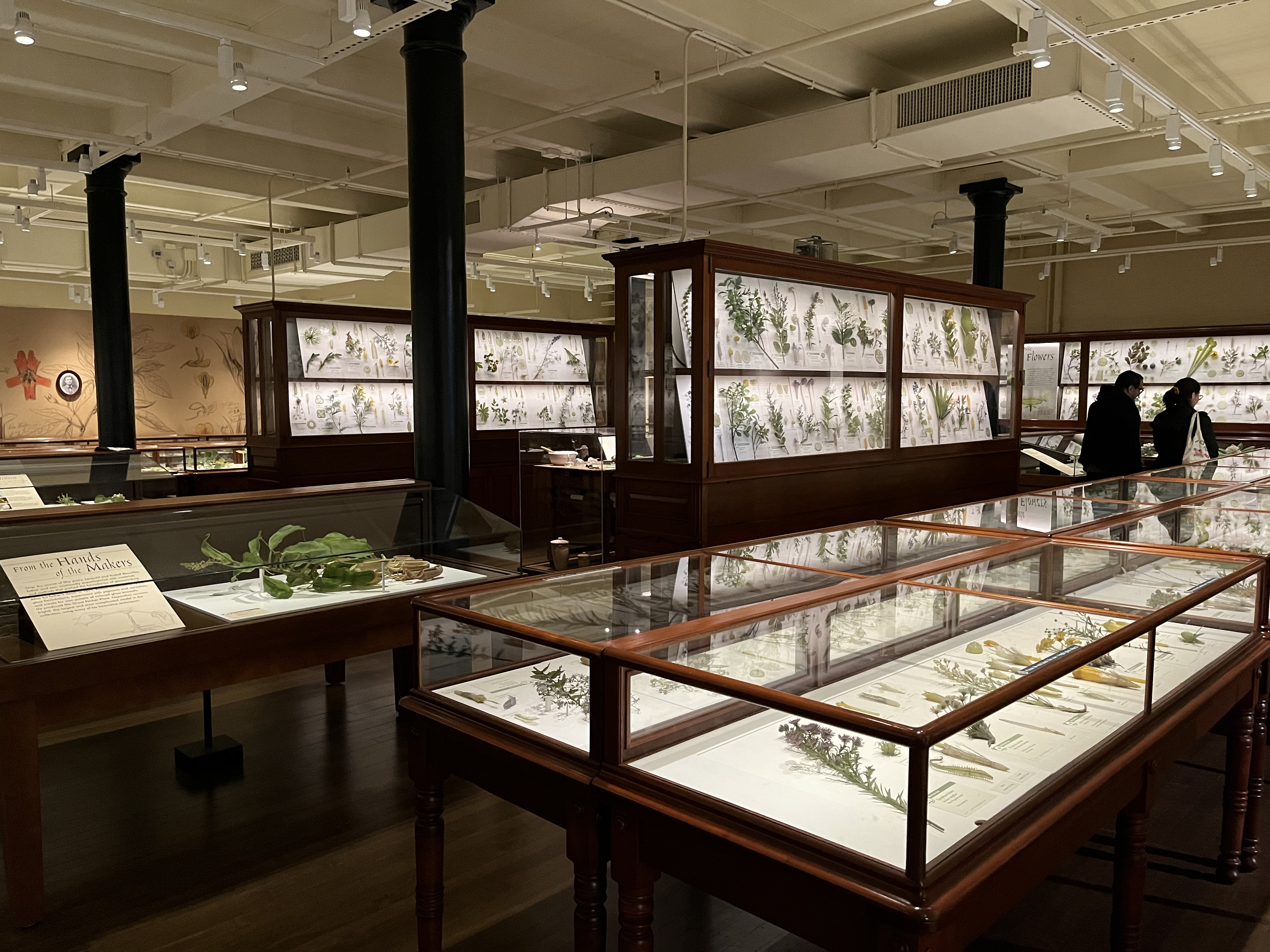
Glass flowers room in 2023

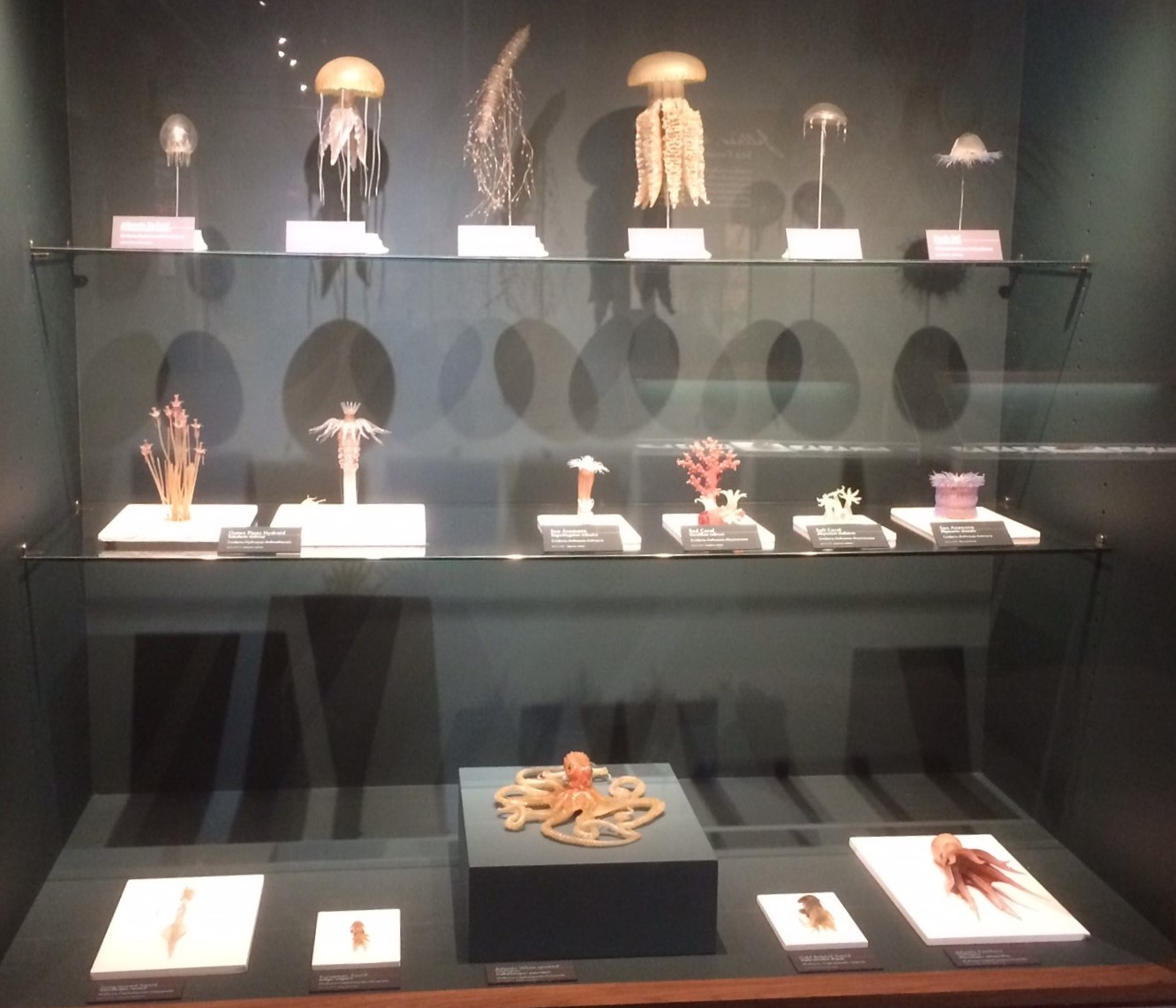
A sample of the Blaschka Glass Sea Creatures

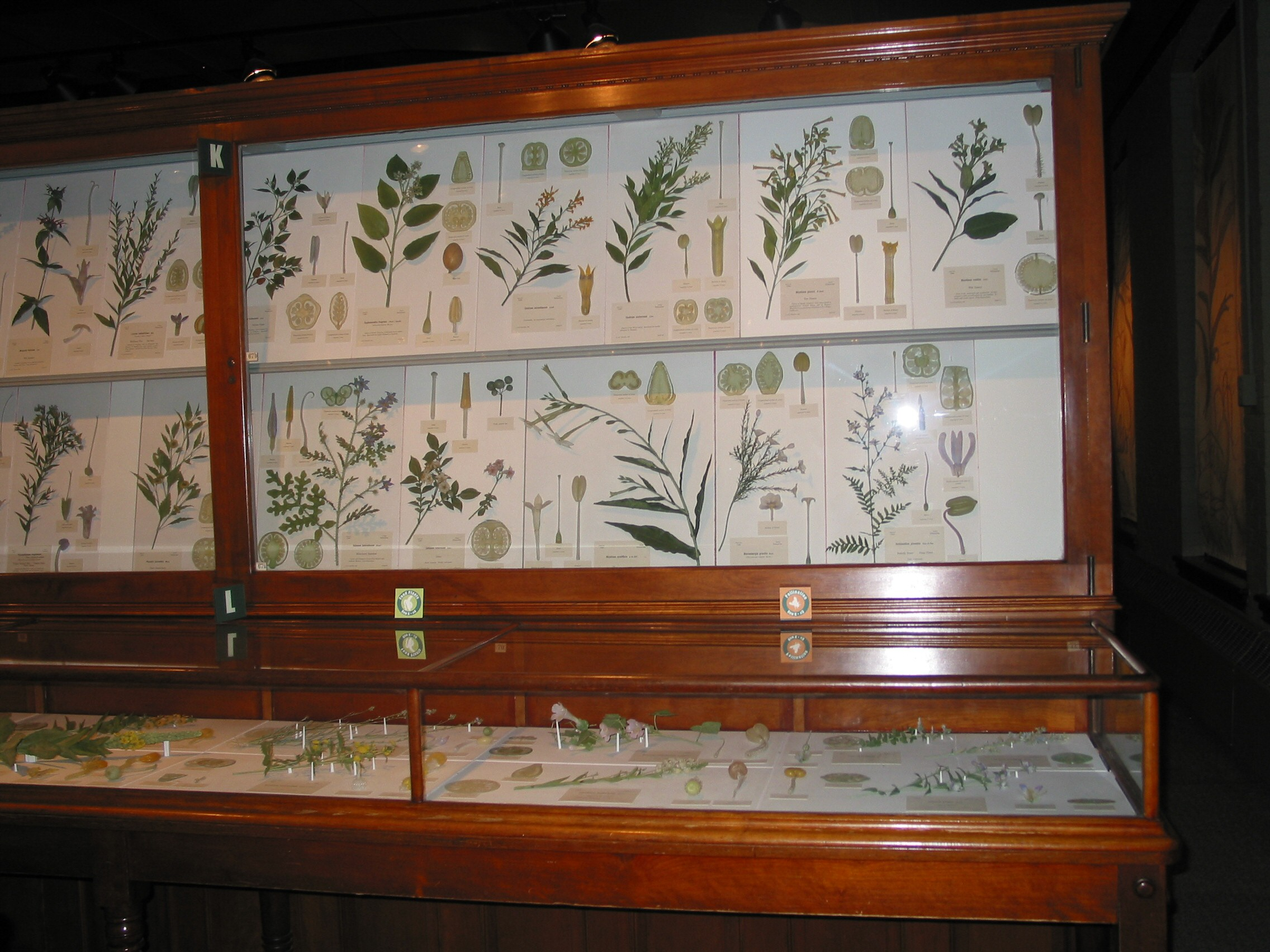
A sample of the Glass Flowers

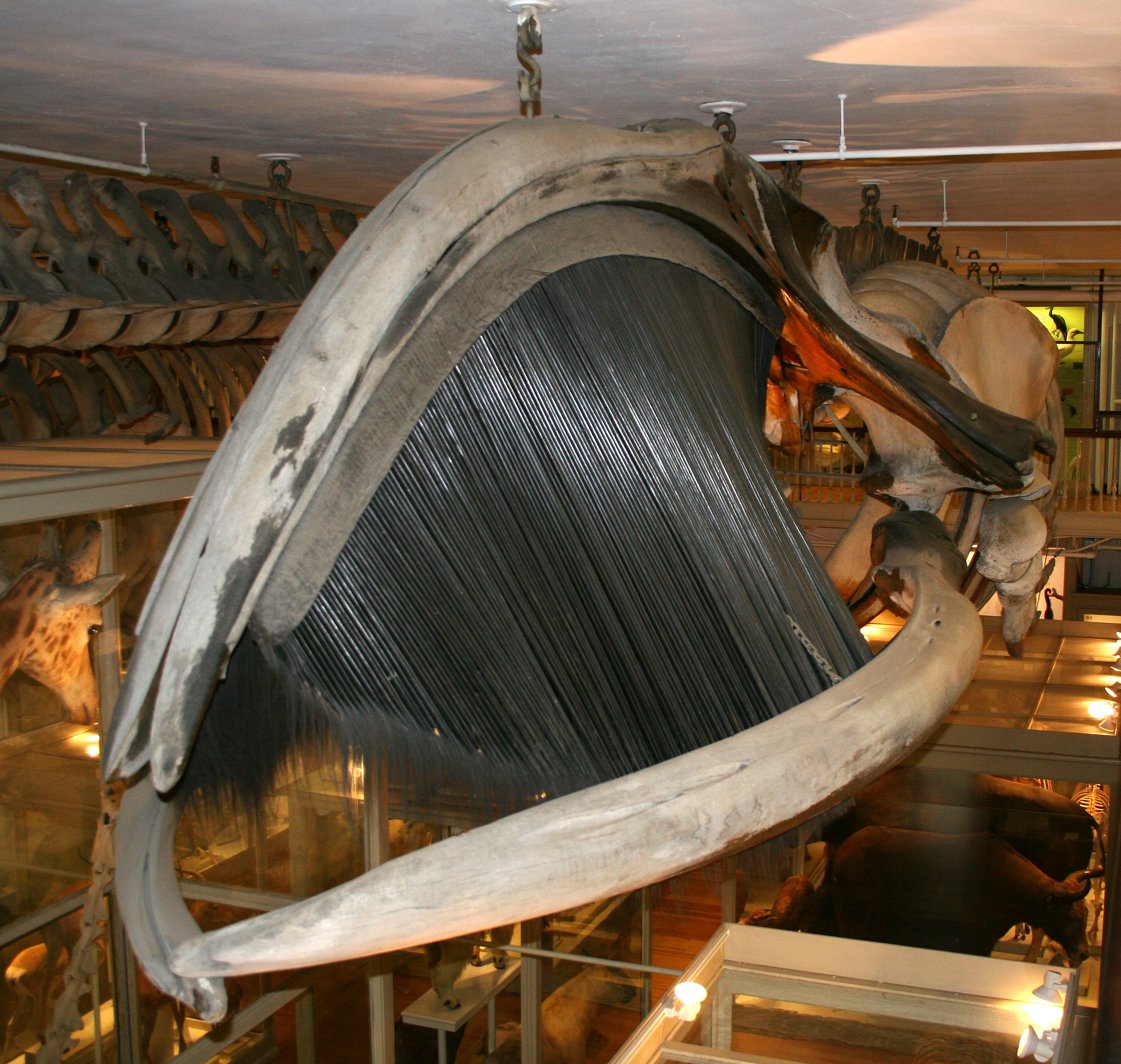
Skeleton of a right whale suspended from the second floor ceiling of the museum

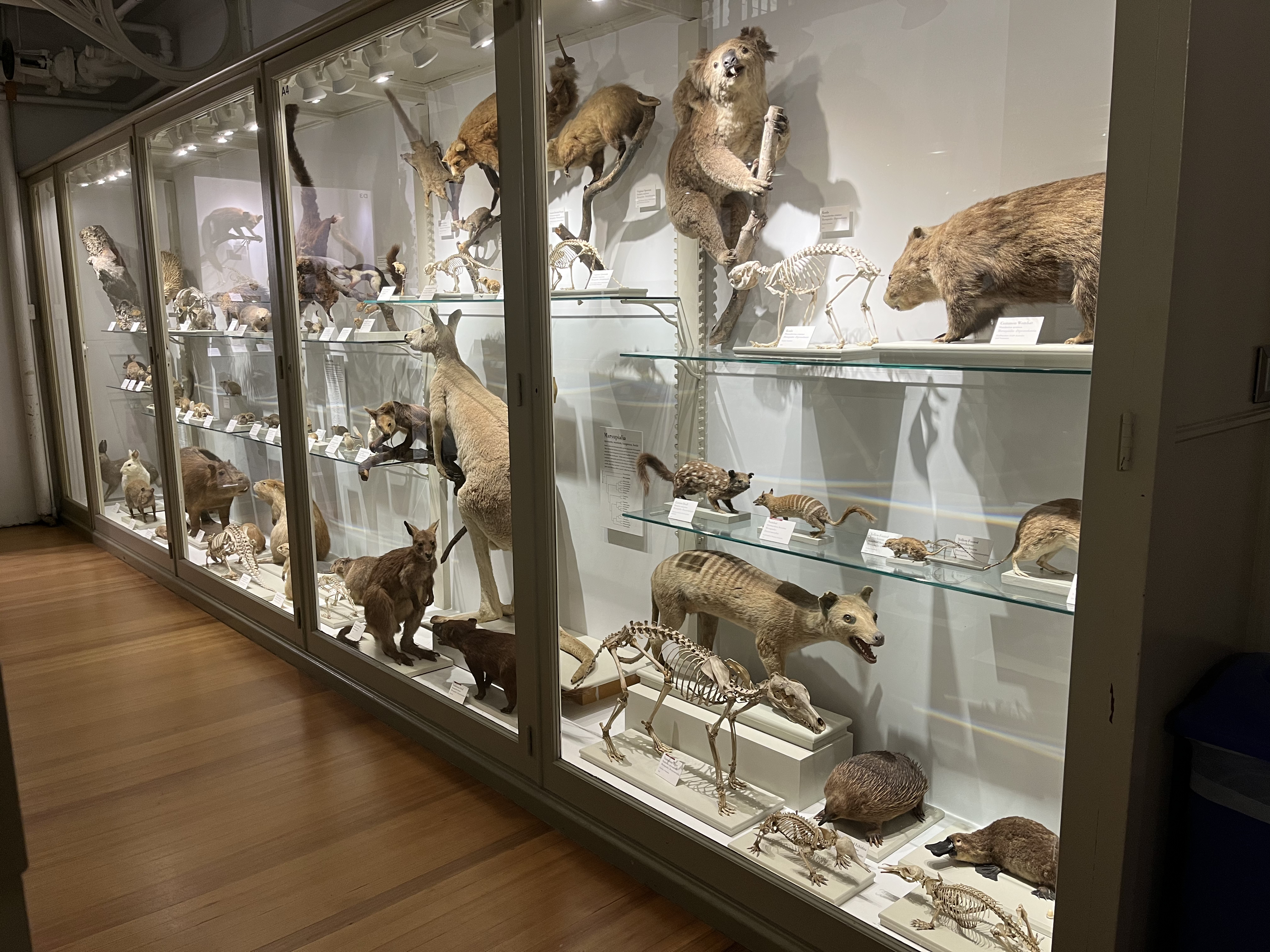
Taxidermy display in 2023

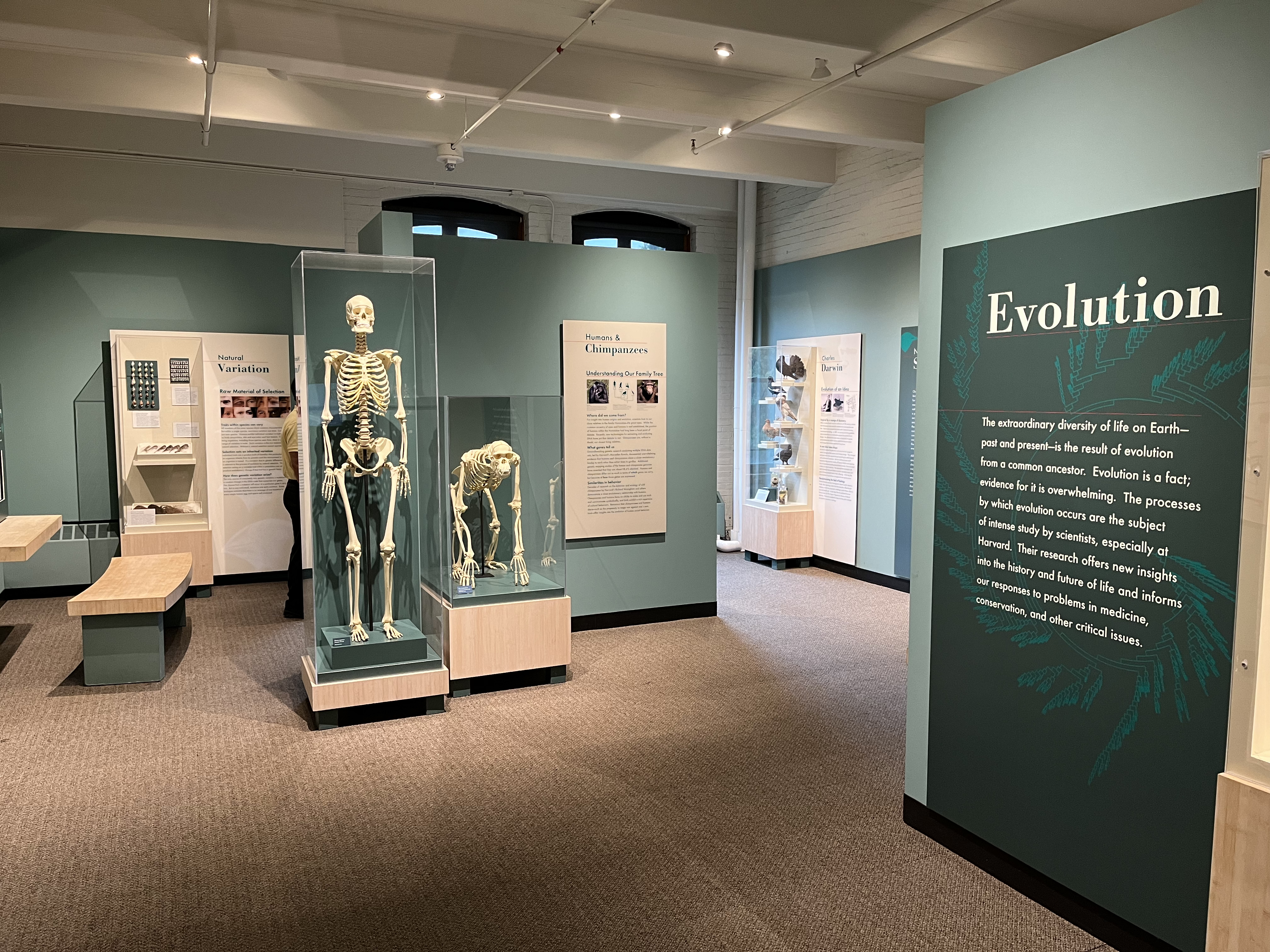
Exhibition on evolution in 2023
