= Cedar Lake (Illinois) =

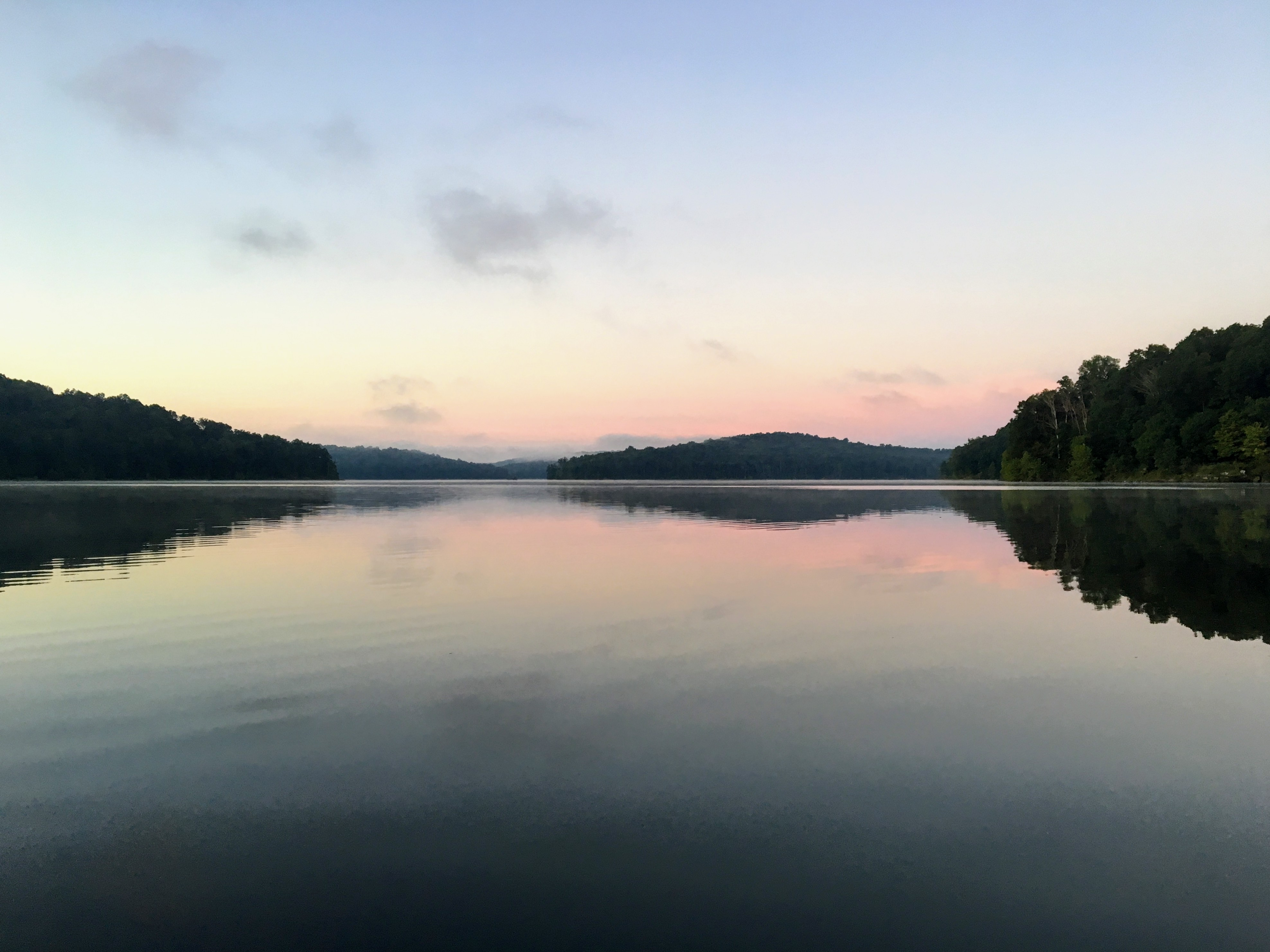

- Location within Illinois Location within the United States
- Location: Jackson County, Illinois
- Coordinates: 37°38′24″N 89°16′47″W
- Type: reservoir
- Primary inflows: Cedar Creek
- Primary outflows: Cedar Creek
- Basin countries: United States
- Max. length: 6 mi (9.7 km)
- Max. width: 0.5 mi (0.80 km)
- Surface area: 1,750 acres (710 ha)
- Average depth: 14 ft (4.3 m)
- Max. depth: 40 ft (12 m)
- Shore length^{1}: 30 mi (48 km)
- ^{1} Shore length is not a well-defined measure.

Cedar Lake is a 1,750-acre (7.0 km²) reservoir in southern Illinois, created by the damming of Cedar Creek, a tributary of the Big Muddy River, in 1974. The lake is located in Jackson County, southwest of Carbondale, Illinois. The lake is accessible from U.S. Highway 51. The lake was constructed for the purpose of supplying tap water to the residents of Carbondale. In addition, the lake serves fishing, swimming, and active recreation purposes.

== Fishing and recreation ==
In addition to water supply purposes, Cedar Lake is managed for bass (largemouth and striped) and crappie fishing. Fishermen can also fish for Channel catfish and bluegill. The lake was described in 2007 as receiving "moderate to heavy" fishing pressure from the recreationally active people of southern Illinois and southeast Missouri.

The city of Carbondale operates a parking lot, swimming beach, and boat dock at Cedar Lake. An admission fee is charged for the beach, but access to other sites is free of charge. The boat power limit is 10 horsepower (7.5 kW) or less.

There is also an extensive trail system running around the lake that is able to be hiked year-round. The Cedar Lake Trail System totals 14 miles in length, and consists of four separate trails. Though there are no developed campsites near the lake, primitive camping is allowed at least 150 ft. from the shoreline.

The nearest interstate exit is Exit 30 on Interstate 57.
