= Nightlife (Carbondale, Illinois) =

Nightlife was a free alternative newsweekly serving Southern Illinois. It published news and commentary, music, arts and leisure, classifieds and comics on a weekly basis, excluding spring, fall and winter breaks during which time a single issue would span multiple weeks.

Regular features included an entertainment guide which lists music, drama and art events based upon date. Free musicians personals are another feature.

The print version of Nightlife as a stand-alone paper was discontinued in July, 2018. It became an insert within the Carbondale Times.
