= Sharp Museum (Southern Illinois University Carbondale) =

Museum in Southern Illinois University

University Museum Southern Illinois University Carbondale
- Established: 1874
- Location: Faner Hall, Door #12; 1000 Faner Drive; Mail code 4508; Carbondale, Illinois 62901
- Coordinates: 37°42′58.19″N 89°13′15.84″W
- Founder: Cyrus Thomas (1871)
- Curators: Wm Stoerger (Exhibits); Susannah Munson (Curator)
- Parking: Public metered parking available across from the Student Center and beside Woody Hall.
- Website: Official website

The Sharp Museum at Southern Illinois University Carbondale, formerly known as the University Museum, is part of the SIUC College of Liberal Arts, and is housed in Faner Hall on the SIUC campus. Sharp Museum has been a repository of artifacts since Cyrus Thomas was commissioned to begin collecting for a museum by the first board of trustees of Southern Illinois Normal University some time before 1871. Originally housed in the building known as "Old Main", the museum first opened to the public in 1874. The museum is considered to be an "encyclopedic museum", with an inventory of 70,000 artifacts.

In 2006, the museum was the recipient of a Leadership in History Award from the American Association for State and Local History for a 2004 exhibit, Words, Wood & Wire: The History of Southern Illinois as Told Through Folk Songs and Musical Instruments.

Longtime museum director, Dona Bachman, retired in 2016, after 16 years at the university. After an extensive search, Deans of the College of Liberal Arts Meera Komarraju and Michael Molino recruited Chris Walls to temporarily replace Bachman. As of March 2017, financial constraints at the university have prevented the museum from starting a search for a replacement.

The museum was accredited by the American Alliance of Museums in 1977. In February 2017, the museum lost its accreditation due to concerns about loss of staff and budget cuts. According to interim director Chris Walls, "The entire university system has failed the museum". Chris Walls was never paid for his services as interim director, even though the museum brought in over $15,0000 via fundraising during his short tenure.

As a result of the state budget impasse, the museum was closed from May 2017 until January 2018.
