= Faner Hall (SIUC) =

Building on the Southern Illinois University Carbondale campus

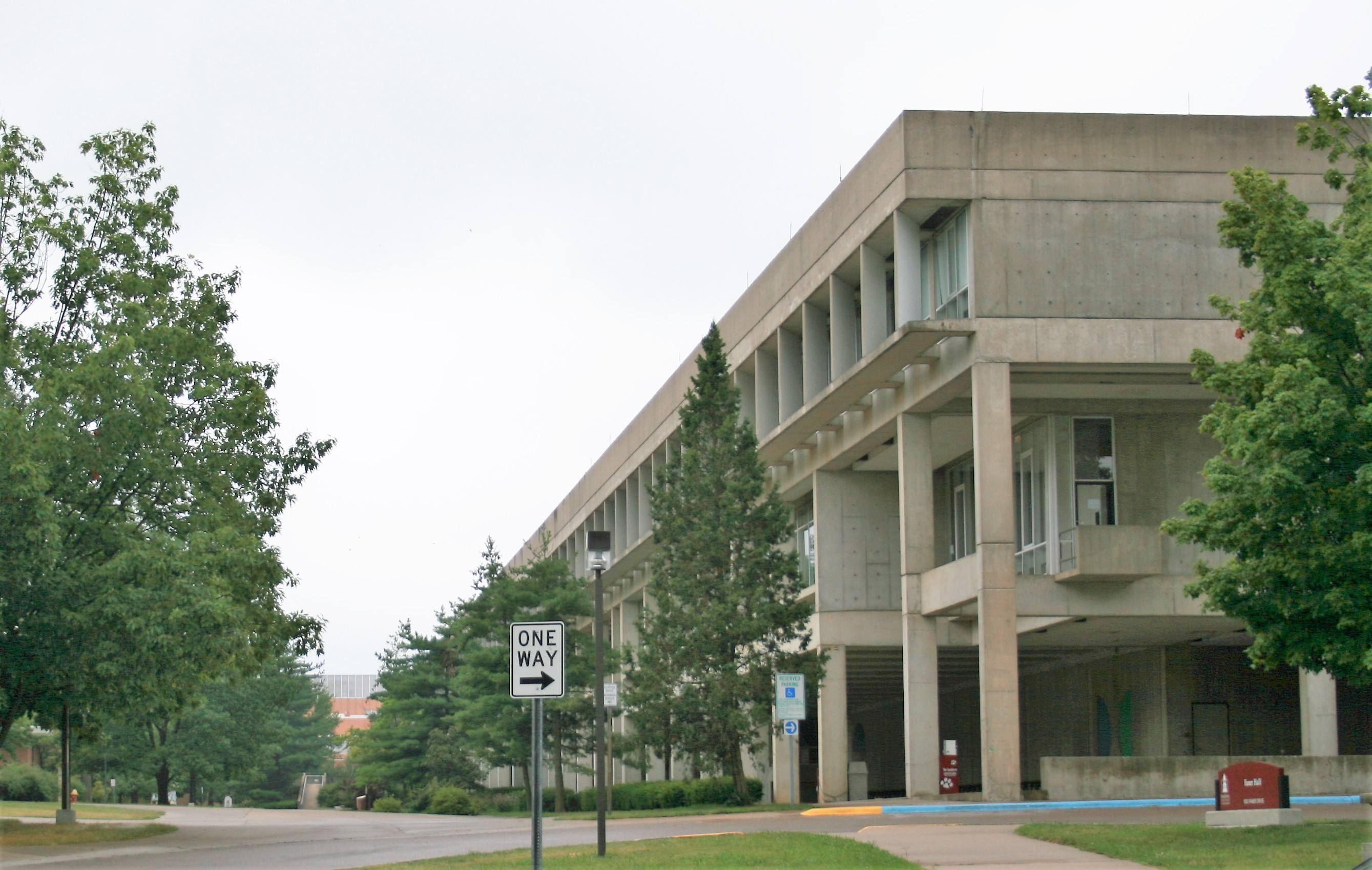
- Interactive map of the Faner Hall area

General information
- Type: Educational
- Architectural style: Brutalist architecture
- Location: Southern Illinois University Carbondale, 1000 Faner Drive; Carbondale, Illinois 62901
- Coordinates: 37.715°N 89.219°W
- Current tenants: SIUC College of Liberal Arts; Sharp Museum
- Completed: 1974
- Cost: $12.75 million
- Owner: Southern Illinois University Carbondale

Dimensions
- Other dimensions: Length: 914 ft

Technical details
- Structural system: Concrete
- Floor count: 4

Design and construction
- Awards and prizes: American Institute of Architects (AIA) - 1970 Citation for Excellence - Quality Design

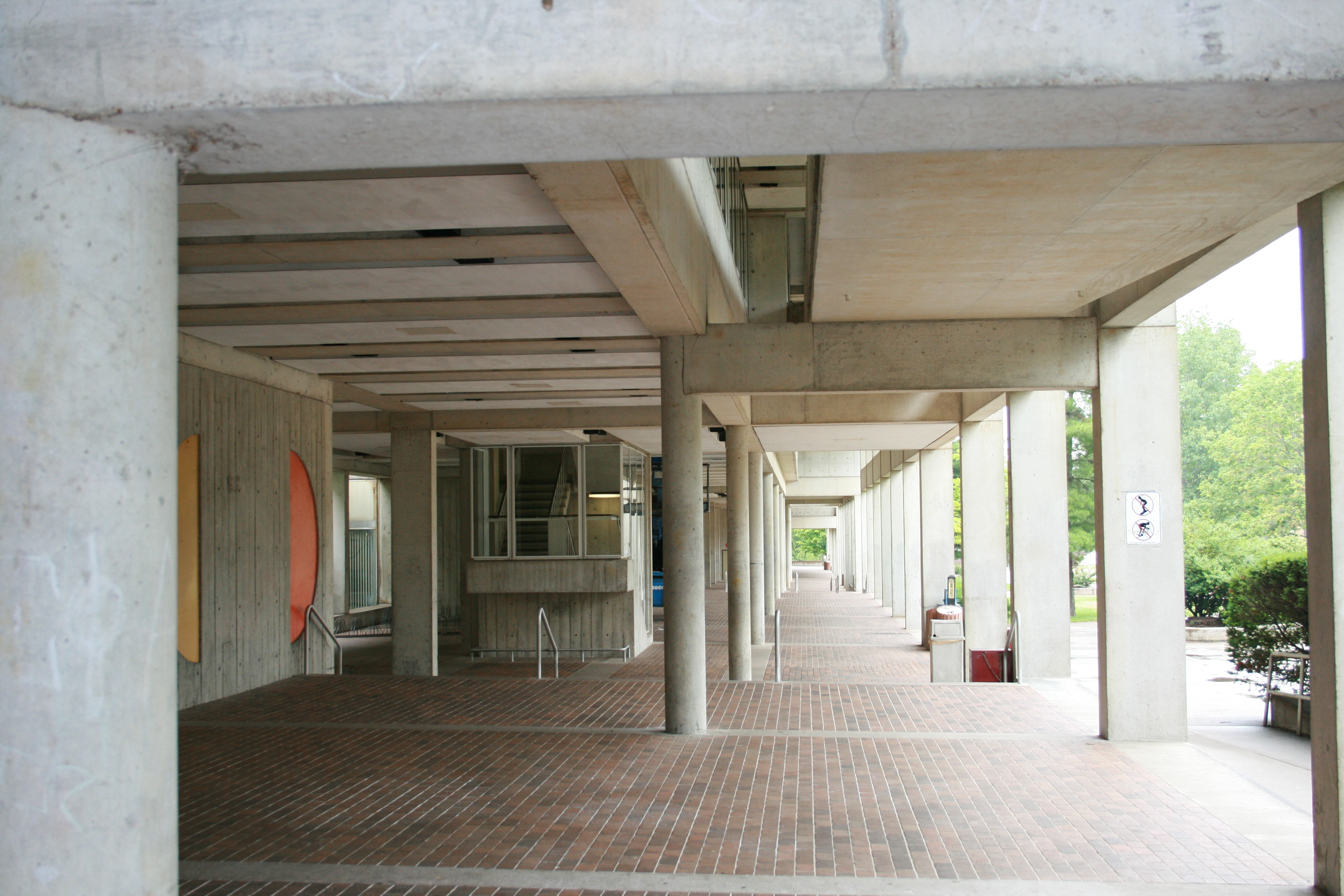
Faner Hall - Underbuilding view to the North

Faner Hall is a building on the campus of Southern Illinois University Carbondale in Carbondale, Illinois. It is named after Robert D. Faner, a former English professor at the university. It is located in the central part of the Southern Illinois University Carbondale campus, and houses the College of Liberal Arts (COLA), which includes multiple departments, as well as the Sharp Museum.

== History ==
Faner Hall was designed by architecture firm Geddes Brecher Qualls Cunningham in the Brutalist style. Faner Hall is 914 feet long and four stories high. It acts as a "wall" between the old and new sections of campus.

On March 6, 1972, a collapse at the construction site killed university freshman Michael G. Hayes. Since its completion in 1974, Faner Hall has been the subject of many rumors on campus.

== Departments ==
Faner Hall houses many of the departments which belong to the University Core Curriculum as well as other areas of study. Departments include Africana Studies, Anthropology, Art & Design, Communication Studies, Criminology & Criminal Justice, Economics, English, Geography & Environmental Resources, History, Languages, Cultures & International Trade, Linguistics, Paralegal Studies, Philosophy, Political Science and Sociology.

== See also ==
- Brutalist architecture in the United States
- List of brutalist structures
