= University Museum (Harvard University) =

- U.S. National Register of Historic Places
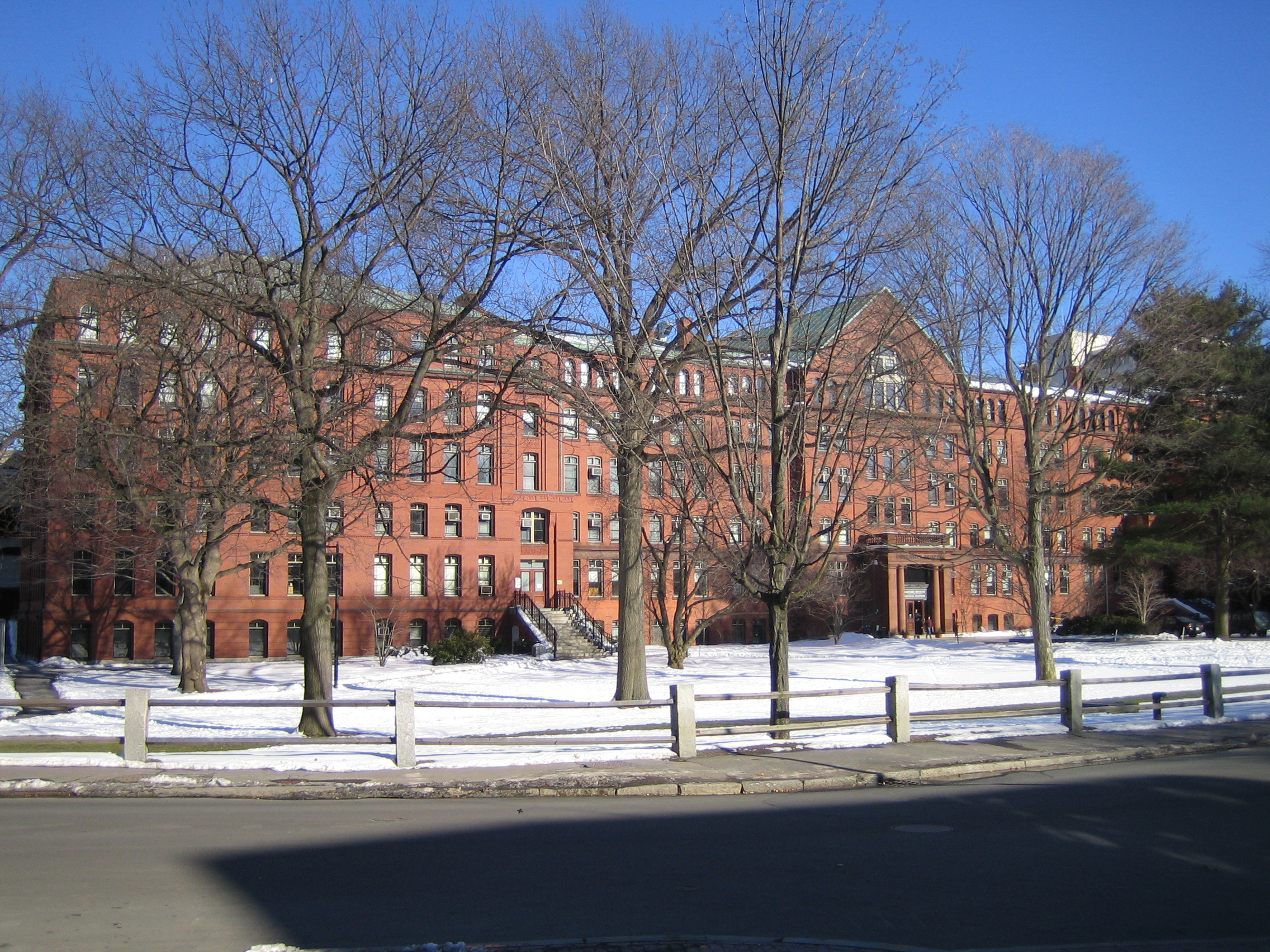
- Harvard Museum of Natural History, located in the building complex

- Location within Massachusetts Location within the United States
- Location: Cambridge, Massachusetts
- Coordinates: 42°22′42.5″N 71°6′55.9″W
- Built: 1859
- Architect: Greenough & Snell
- Architectural style: Renaissance
- MPS: Cambridge MRA
- NRHP reference No.: 86002081
- Added to NRHP: September 12, 1986

The University Museum is a historic building that houses several museums belonging to Harvard University. The building is located at 24-28 Oxford Street and 11-25 Divinity Avenue in Cambridge, Massachusetts. It houses both the Harvard Museum of Natural History at 26 Oxford Street, and the Peabody Museum of Archaeology and Ethnology at 11 Divinity Avenue, as well as several departments of Harvard's Museum of Comparative Zoology and the Mineralogical & Geological Museum.

The building is a large U-shaped brick structure, six stories high, whose oldest portion dates to 1859. This section was built to house the Museum of Comparative Zoology; it was added onto in 1876 to provide space for the Peabody Museum, and was expanded several other times between then and 1913. The building is basically Italian Renaissance in its styling.

The building was listed on the National Register of Historic Places in 1986.

== See also ==
- National Register of Historic Places listings in Cambridge, Massachusetts
