= BioOne =

Nonprofit publisher

- Producer: BioOne (United States)
- History: 1999 to present

Access
- Cost: Subscription

Coverage
- Disciplines: Sciences

Links
- Website: www.bioonepublishing.org
- Title list(s): www.bioone.org/action/showPublications?type=byAlphabet

BioOne is a nonprofit publisher of scientific research.

BioOne was established in 1999 in Washington, DC, as a 501(c)(3) not-for-profit organization by five scholarly collaborators: the American Institute of Biological Sciences, the Scholarly Publishing and Academic Resources Coalition (SPARC), The University of Kansas, Greater Western Library Alliance, and Allen Press.

The main impetus for BioOne's creation was the common desire amongst key scholarly stakeholders for an alternative to commercial scholarly publishing.

Half of the subscription fee revenue from BioOne Complete is divided between participating publishers.

== See also ==
- List of academic databases and search engines
