= Shryock Auditorium (SIUC) =

Coordinates: 37°42′57.4″N 89°13′4.7″W

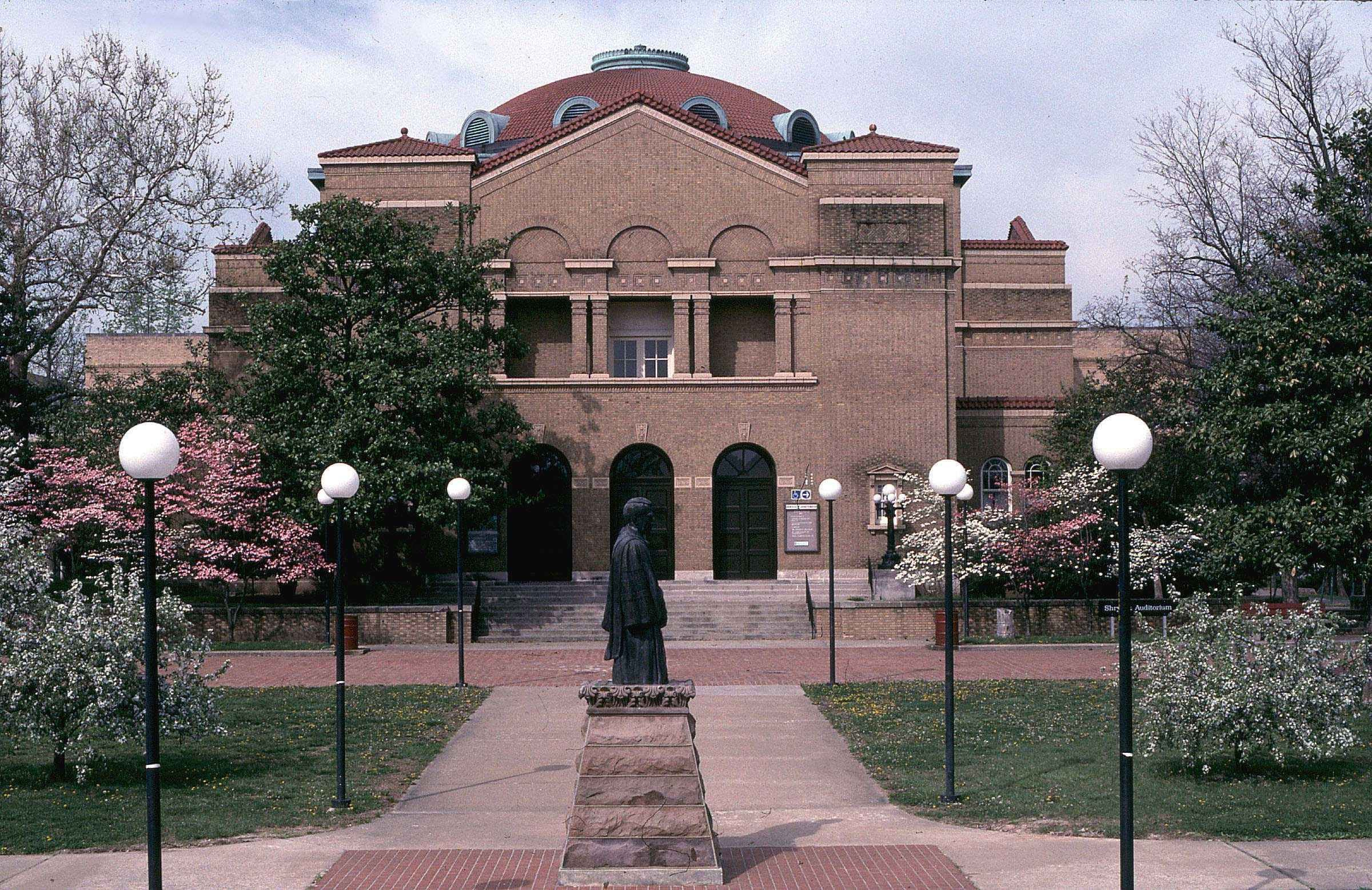
- Interactive map of the Shryock Auditorium area

General information
- Location: Southern Illinois University Carbondale, Carbondale, Illinois
- Opened: 1918
- Renovated: 1969-1970, 2002-2014

Design and construction
- Architect: James B. Dibelka

Other information
- Seating capacity: 1200 (originally 1,440)

Shryock Auditorium is an auditorium located on the campus of Southern Illinois University Carbondale in Carbondale, Illinois, United States. The auditorium was named for the university's fifth president, Henry William Shryock, who died inside the building just before a student convocation on April 13, 1935. The auditorium is a focal point for musical performances and distinguished lectures in the local area.

The auditorium was designed by State Architect James B. Dibelka of Chicago, and construction was awarded to Champaign-area general contractor A.W. Stoolman. Construction began in mid-1916, following the award of $135,000.00 for construction by the Illinois General Assembly in early 1915.

The auditorium's dome was originally stained glass. This was removed in the 1960s to allow for concerts and performances during the day and replaced with an elaborate system of latticework. The original stained glass is maintained by the Special Collections Research Center at Morris Library on campus.

The auditorium's last major upgrade was in 1969-1970. The project included installation of updated theater lighting, and remodeling of the lobby. During construction in 1970, the Reuter pipe organ was also installed on the upper balcony. Between 2002 and 2014, the stage of the auditorium was replaced and a new lighting and electrical control system was installed.

== Shryock Organ ==
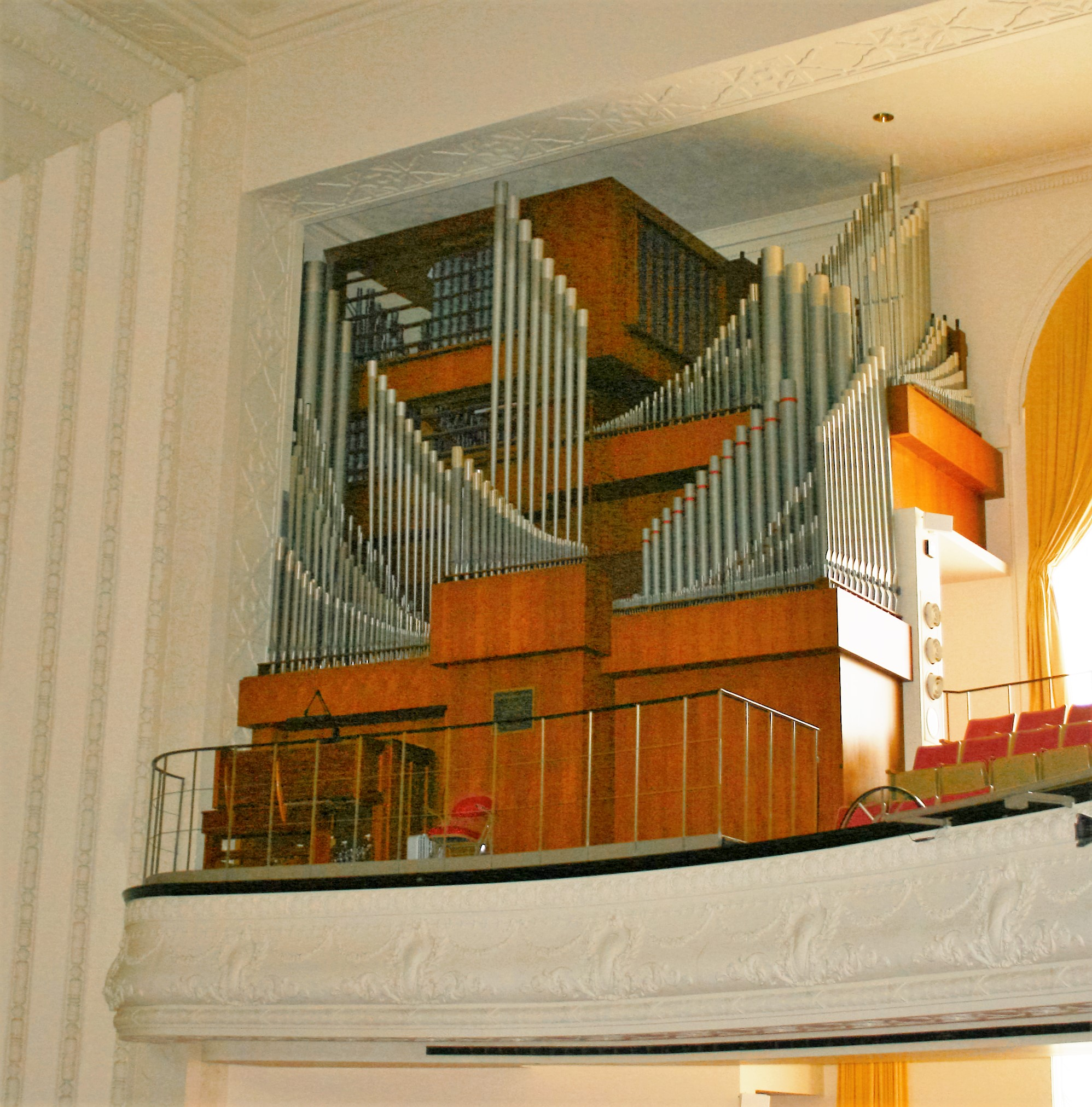
The Marianne Webb pipe organ on the second floor of Shryock Auditorium

A prominent feature of the auditorium is a 3,312-pipe, 3-manual, 58-rank, Reuter Pipe Organ (Opus 1741) built in 1970. The organ was designed by and named for organ professor Marianne Webb, who died on December 7, 2013.

Great	Positiv-Choir	Swell	Pedal
16' Quintaten 8' Principal 8' Bourdon 4' Octave 4' Spitzflöte 2' Super Octave IV Mixture III Scharf 16' Dulzian 8' Trompete Chimes	8' Gedeckt 8' Flute Dolce * 8' Flute Celeste * 4' Principal 4' Koppelflöte 2' Spitzprincipal 1 1/3' Quint 1' Sifflöte III Cymbel 8' Krummhorn Tremulant	8' Principal 8' Rohrflöte 8' Viole de Gambe 8' Viole Celeste 4' Principal 4' Hohlflöte 2 2/3' Nazard 2' Blockflöte 1 3/5' Tierce V Plein Jeu 16' Fagot 8' Trompette 8' Hautbois 4' Clarion Tremulant	32' Acoustic Bass 16' Principal 16' Subbass 16' Quintaten (GT) 16' Rohrflöte (SW) 8' Octave 8' Spitzflöte. 8' Rohrflöte (SW) 4' Super Octave 4' Nachthorn 2' Nachthorn IV Mixture 16' Posaune 16' Fagot 8' Trumpet 4' Rohr Schalmey

== Notable speeches, performances, and events ==
Event Type	Speaker / Performer	Date
Speech	President of the United States William Howard Taft	1918-04-04
Funeral	University President, Henry William Shryock	1935-04-13
Speech	President of the United States Harry S. Truman	1948-09-30
Speech	Former First Lady Eleanor Roosevelt	1954-05-05
Speech	Vice President of the United States Richard Nixon	1956-10-24
Speech	Buckminster Fuller	1965-10-21
Performance	Steve Goodman	1977-01-21
Interview	Tom Waits	1979-10-09
Performance	Stevie Ray Vaughan and Double Trouble - Couldn't Stand the Weather Tour	1984-02-11
Performance	Depeche Mode - Some Great Reward Tour	1985-03-24
Performance	Carol Channing	2003-10-02
Performance	Paula Poundstone	2009-10-04
Performance	Paul Jacobs	2014-01-17
Performance	Yung Gravy and Terror Reid	2022-10-12
Performance	Mariah the Scientist	2025-10-22
