= William M. Lewis Sr. =

American biologist and professor (1921–2010)

William Madison Lewis Sr. (26 November 1921 in Faison, North Carolina – 15 May 2010 in Clinton, North Carolina) was a fish biologist who founded the Fisheries and Illinois Aquaculture Center at Southern Illinois University Carbondale. He attended Iowa State University where he obtained M.A. and Ph.D. degrees in zoology specializing in fisheries science. In 1950, he became a professor at Southern Illinois University, where he founded and directed the Southern Illinois University Carbondale Cooperative Fisheries Research Program, now called the Fisheries and Illinois Aquaculture Center. His mission for the program was to study the fishes of Illinois and to train graduate students in fisheries science and aquaculture.

Lewis and his students published extensively on native and stocked fish populations and on fish culture. Notable work includes research on the effect of winter on fishes in large rivers. He also produced many reports on aquaculture techniques such as recirculating biofiltration systems for hybrid striped bass.

Lewis served for a time as chair of the department of zoology at Southern Illinois University Carbondale, and was elected president of the American Fisheries Society in 1983. He received the American Fisheries Society Award of Excellence, the society's highest honor, in 1995. He retired from Southern Illinois University Carbondale in 1983 and started two fish farms in North Carolina.

Lewis died on May 15, 2010.

Dr. William Lewis (right) electrofishing with colleagues in a southern Illinois lake about 1950
