= Fisheries and Illinois Aquaculture Center =

US research center

The logo of the Fisheries and Illinois Aquaculture Center at SIUC.

The Fisheries and Illinois Aquaculture Center at Southern Illinois University Carbondale (SIUC) was founded by Dr. William M. Lewis, Senior in 1950. The center is administratively housed in the Graduate School. Faculty have joint appointments in the Center and the Department of Zoology within the College of Science or in the Department of Animal Science, Food and Nutrition in the College of Agricultural Sciences.

Research faculty in the Center have diverse capabilities including molecular genetics, aquatic toxicology, aquatic ecology, bioenergetics, fish nutrition, fish physiology, fisheries policy and management, and aquaculture technology.

Facilities include several research laboratories, an experimental pond facility (90 ponds), a large wet laboratory, research boats (including a 27-foot (8.2 m) research vessel with advanced hydroacoustics), and offices.

The Center generates many peer-reviewed publications and garners grant support from many state and federal agencies as well as foundations.

== Off-campus locations ==
- Pond facility coordinates: 37.634834°N 89.175284°W
- Wet lab coordinates: 37.710477°N 89.238591°W
