= Rodney P. Kelly =

United States Air Force general

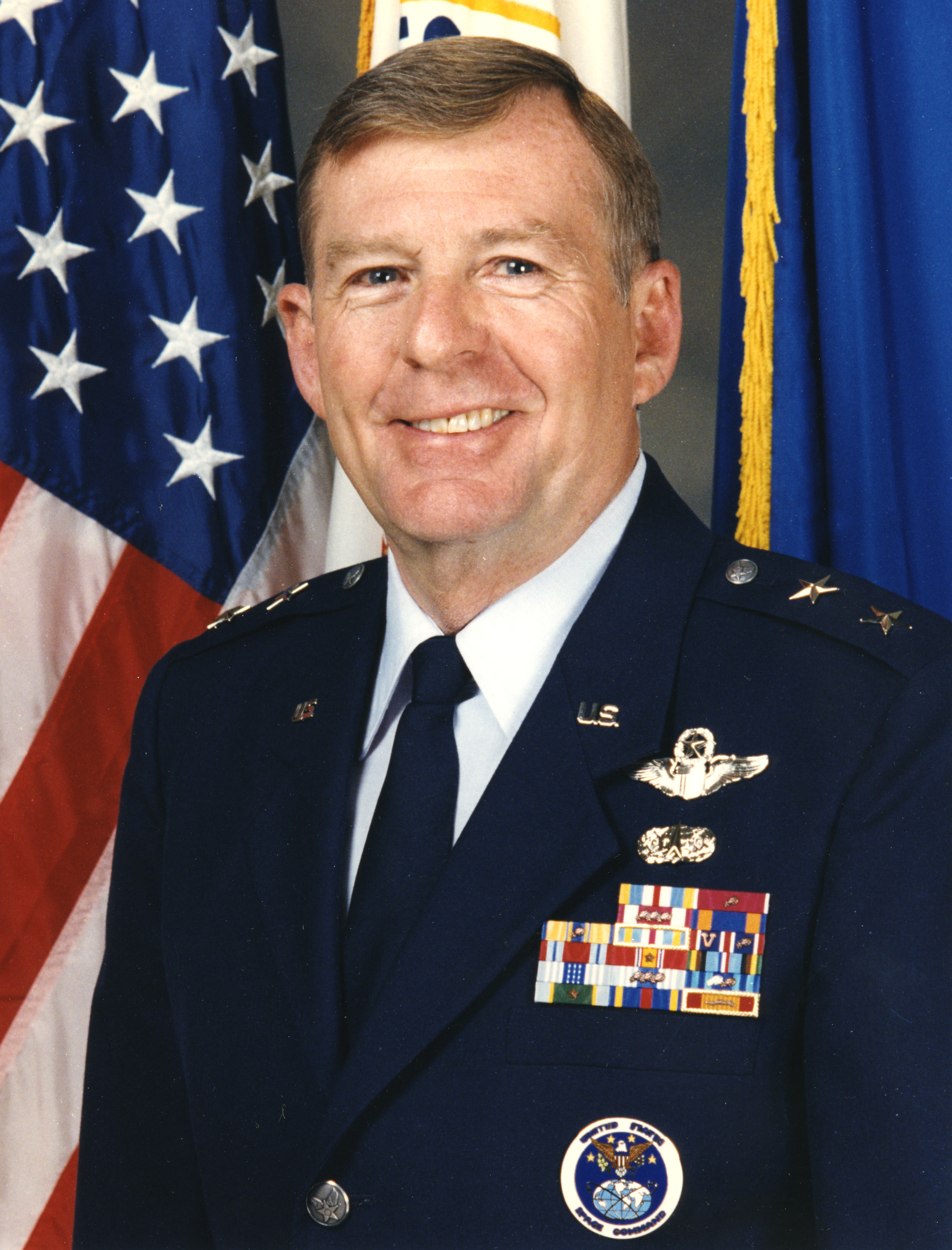
- Military career
- Allegiance: United States
- Branch: United States Air Force
- Service years: 1967–2002
- Rank: Major general
- Commands: Assistant Deputy Chief of Staff of the Air Force for Plans and Programs

Rodney P. Kelly is a retired major general in the United States Air Force. He served in the Air Force from 1967 through 2001.

== Early life and education ==
A native of southern Illinois, Kelly attended Southern Illinois University-Carbondale, receiving a B.S. in agriculture in 1966 and an M.A. in business administration in 1968. He completed the Reserve Officer Training Corps program in 1967 and was commissioned a lieutenant.

== Military career ==
He was a command and combat pilot with more than 4,000 flying hours. In the course of his 34-year career he commanded several Air Force units, including the 527th Aggressor Squadron and the 3rd Wing, Elmendorf Air Force Base, Alaska. He served as director of operations at the headquarters of U.S. Space Command, then as assistant deputy chief of staff for plans and programs for the United States Air Force in Washington, D.C. until his retirement on January 1, 2002.

== Decorations ==
Kelly received several awards and decorations for his outstanding service to the United States. These honors include: the Defense Superior Service Medal; the Legion of Merit with oak leaf cluster; Meritorious Service Medal with three oak leaf clusters; Air Medal; and the Air Force Commendation Medal with oak leaf cluster.

- Defense Superior Service Medal
- Legion of Merit with oak leaf cluster
- Meritorious Service Medalwith three oak leaf clusters
- Air Medal
- Air Force Commendation Medal with oak leaf clusters
