= Austin Lane =

American college administrator

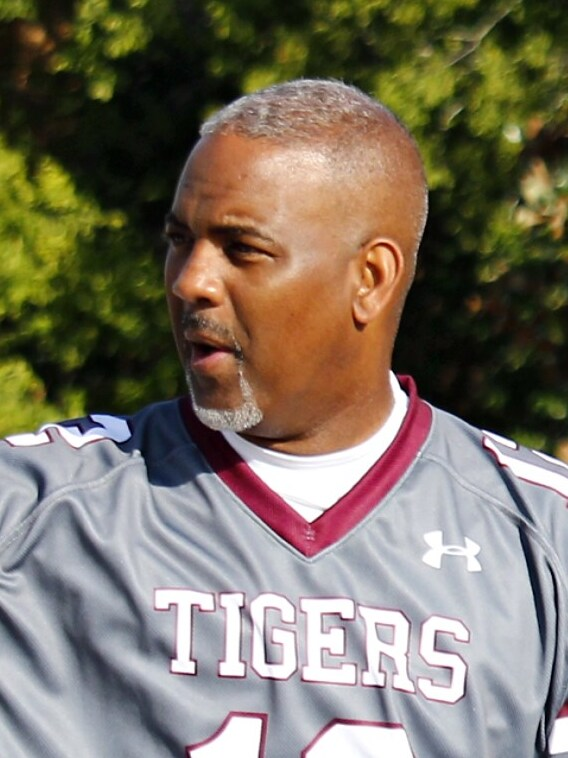
- Lane in 2019

9th Chancellor of Southern Illinois University Carbondale
- Incumbent
- Assumed office July 1, 2020
- Preceded by: John Dunn (interim)

12th President of Texas Southern University
- In office June 6, 2016 – February 4, 2020
- Preceded by: John M. Rudley
- Succeeded by: Kenneth Huewitt (interim)

3rd President of Lone Star College-Montgomery
- In office 2009–2015
- Preceded by: Tom Butler
- Succeeded by: Rebecca Riley

Academic background
- Education: Langston University (BA); University of Oklahoma (MA); University of Alabama (Ed.D.)
- Thesis: Private scholarship aid, access, and success for African American and Hispanic students attending a public, large, rural -serving Associate's College (2009)
- Doctoral advisor: David E. Hardy

Austin A. Lane is an American college official and chancellor of Southern Illinois University Carbondale.

== Early life and education ==
Lane was born in New Jersey and graduated from Hackensack High School. He attended Odessa Junior College, received a BA from Langston University, an MA from the University of Oklahoma, and an Ed. D. from the University of Alabama.

== Career ==
Lane was executive vice chancellor of Lone Star College in 2015. In 2016, Lane became president of Texas Southern University (TSU), succeeding John M. Rudley. He departed in 2020 after controversy over an admissions scandal at its law school and questions over entertainment spending from a foundation connected to the university. In 2020 he was appointed chancellor of Southern Illinois University Carbondale.
