= Southern Illinois University Carbondale =

Public university in Carbondale, Illinois, US

Coordinates: 37°42′38″N 89°13′10″W

- Former name: Southern Illinois Normal University (1869–1947)
- Motto: Deo Volente ("God willing")
- Type: Public research university
- Established: 1869; 157 years ago
- Accreditation: HLC
- Academic affiliations: ORAU
- Endowment: $228.5 million (2025)
- Budget: $436,963,000 (2025)
- Chancellor: Austin Lane
- President: Daniel F. Mahony
- Academic staff: 1,448 (2024)
- Administrative staff: 3,363 (2022)
- Students: 11,785 (fall 2025)
- Undergraduates: 8,553 (fall 2024)
- Postgraduates: 3,237 (fall 2024)
- Location: Carbondale, Illinois, United States
- Campus: 1,133 acres (459 ha); College Town, Rural
- Newspaper: The Daily Egyptian
- Colors: Maroon and black
- Nickname: Salukis
- Sporting affiliations: NCAA Division I FCS — MVC
- Mascot: Saluki
- Website: siu.edu

Southern Illinois University Carbondale (SIU) is a public research university in Carbondale, Illinois, United States. Chartered in 1869, SIU is the oldest and flagship campus of the Southern Illinois University system. SIU enrolls students from all 50 states and more than 100 countries. Originally founded as a normal college, the university today provides programs in a variety of disciplines. SIU was granted limited university status in 1943 and began offering graduate degrees in 1950. A separate campus was established in Edwardsville, Illinois, in 1957, eventually becoming Southern Illinois University Edwardsville.

The university is classified among "R1: Doctoral Universities – very High research activity". It is also known for its research partnerships, including those with the Argonne and Oak Ridge National Laboratories, the U.S. Geological Survey, the U.S. Fish and Wildlife Service, and NASA. The university is home to hundreds of student organizations, twenty-seven fraternity and sorority chapters, and a competitive flight team. SIU's intercollegiate athletic teams are collectively known as the Southern Illinois Salukis.

== History ==
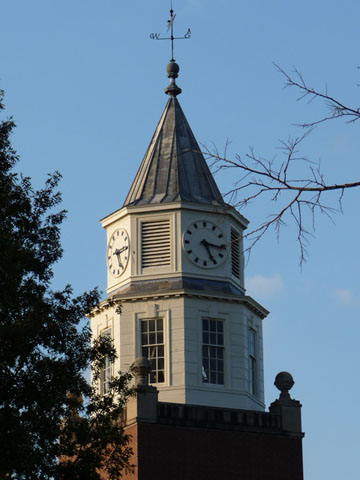
The Pulliam Hall clock tower plays the Westminster Quarters chime on a regular basis and others on holidays and special occasions. The landmark tower is a symbol of the university and was previously used in SIU's logo.

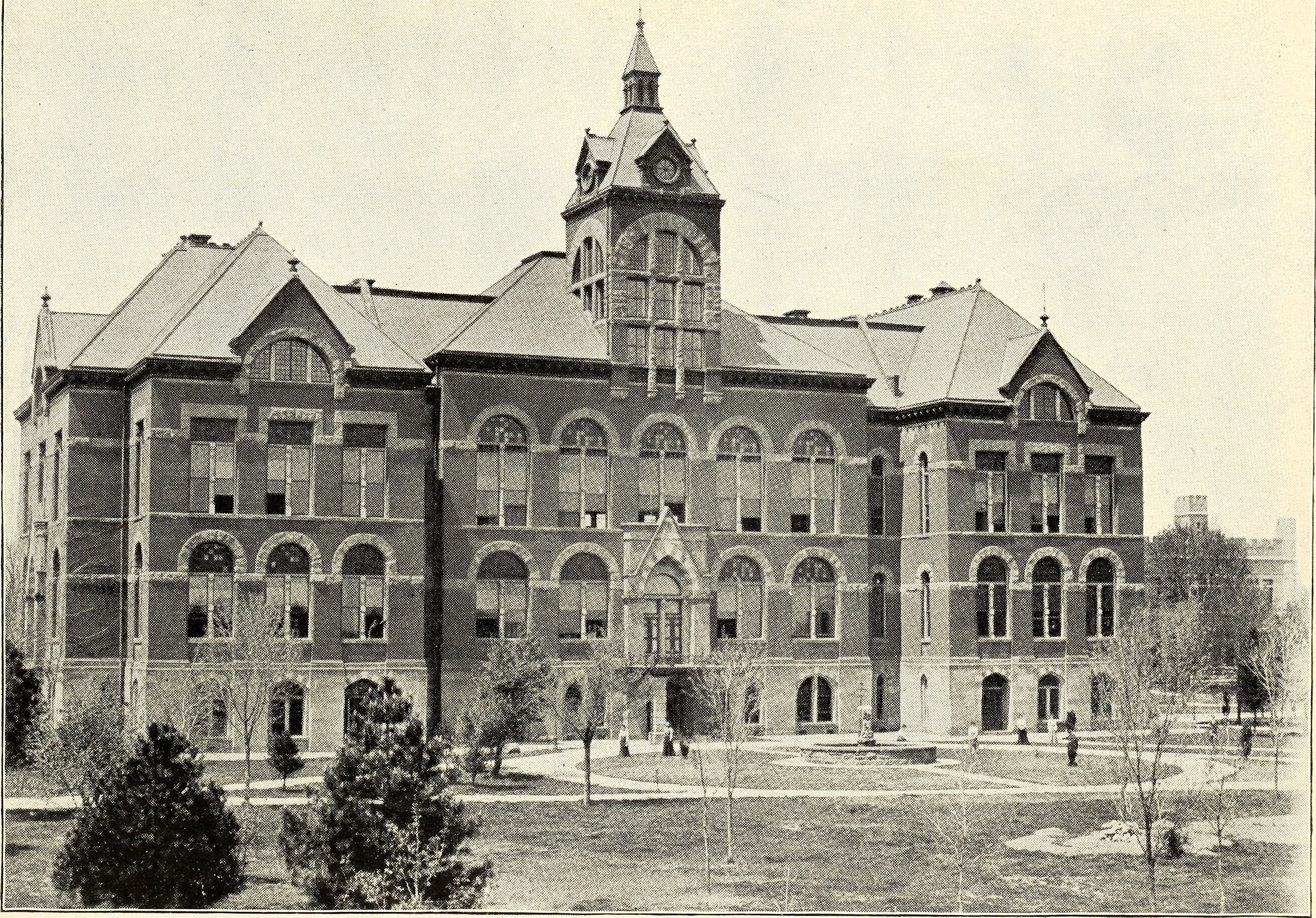
The Old Main Building as seen before its destruction by fire in 1969.

Southern Illinois Normal College was chartered by an act of the Twenty-Sixth Illinois General Assembly on March 9, 1869, the second state-supported normal school to be created in Illinois. Carbondale was selected to host the university and a cornerstone-laying ceremony was held on May 17, 1870. Alternate sites considered for the university included Centralia and DuQuoin, among others. The accidental death of a site contractor and other delays prevented the university's opening until 1874. The first session of the university was a summer institute with eight faculty members and an enrollment of 53 students.

In 1876 SIU admitted its first African-American student, Alexander Lane. In 1878 SIU established a program for the Douglas Corps Cadets, beginning a relationship with ROTC programs which lasts into the present day. The original "Old Main" building was destroyed by fire in 1883, and a new one was built in the same spot. The university's first student newspaper, The Normal Gazette, was published in 1888 and its first yearbook, The Sphinx, in 1899. SIU's first sports teams, known as "the Maroons", formed in the 1913-1914 school year.

The Shryock Auditorium was completed in 1918 and dedicated by former U.S. President Taft with a speech in support of the on-going war effort. Post-war prosperity aided the university's growth, and by 1922 it enrolled over 1,000 students. Stagnation occurred with the onset of the Great Depression and the sudden deaths of university presidents Henry Shryock and Roscoe Pulliam. In 1943 SIU was granted limited university status to offer graduate degrees, and in 1947 the Illinois General Assembly officially adopted the name Southern Illinois University. Budget concerns and leadership challenges dogged the presidency of Chester F. Lay, Pulliam's successor, until his resignation in 1948. In that same year, the first formal research conducted at SIU began with Lay's appointment of geneticist Carl C. Lindegren.

Delyte W. Morris was inaugurated as SIU's president in 1949. Morris was SIU's longest-serving president, his 22-year tenure seeing the expansion and transformation of the university. New educational programs, administrative positions, and physical facilities were added, financed by a growth in student population and state-supported bonds. Housing and other amenities for students received particular focus. In 1957 a second campus of SIU was established at Edwardsville, near St. Louis. This school would develop into Southern Illinois University Edwardsville, now a public university within the SIU system.

President Morris left office in 1970. Formal explanations focused on Morris' declining health, but campus unrest due to the Vietnam War, the burning of the Old Main Building in 1969, financial scandals, and distrust amongst SIU's Board of Trustees are speculated to have played a role. The university continued to grow with the creation of law, medical, and dental schools in the early 1970s. Other achievements included the opening of the long-awaited recreation center in 1977, the foundation of Project Achieve by Barbara Kupiec in 1978, and the Saluki men's football team NCAA I-AA national football championship title win in 1983.

SIU's enrollment reached a record enrollment of 24,869 students in 1991, a time when SIU became notorious for its party school reputation. Tensions with the surrounding community resulted in a ban on Halloween celebrations in the mid-1990s as students living in university dormitories were sent home for the holiday. Funding issues stemming from Illinois' state budget crises, including the 2015-2017 budget impasse, and declining student enrollment exacerbated a situation made worse by the unexpected deaths of university presidents Paul Sarvela and Carlo Montemagno. In recent years, a focus on research, building renovations and expansions, and stabilizing enrollment numbers have improved the university's position. Student celebrations like the ones seen in Saturday Night Live's Roadshow have now largely been replaced with the traditions of "Unofficial Halloween" and "Polar Bear". Despite this, SIU was still named ninth in a list of "The Top 10 Schools that Party All Day, Everyday" by College Magazine in 2015.

== Campus ==
At the time of SIU's first class in 1874, the university consisted of one three-story building constructed between 1870 and 1874. Many of the university's first buildings were constructed as the university expanded throughout the late 1800s and early 1900s. Major additions were built during the 1960-70s and the 2000-10s. The age of the university is reflected in the various architectural styles on display, including examples of Victorian and Brutalist designs. In addition to its physical facilities, the campus boasts several areas of natural beauty, including Thompson Woods and Campus Lake. Various memorials, monuments, artistic structures, and other sites of interest are also present throughout the campus.

=== Student amenities ===
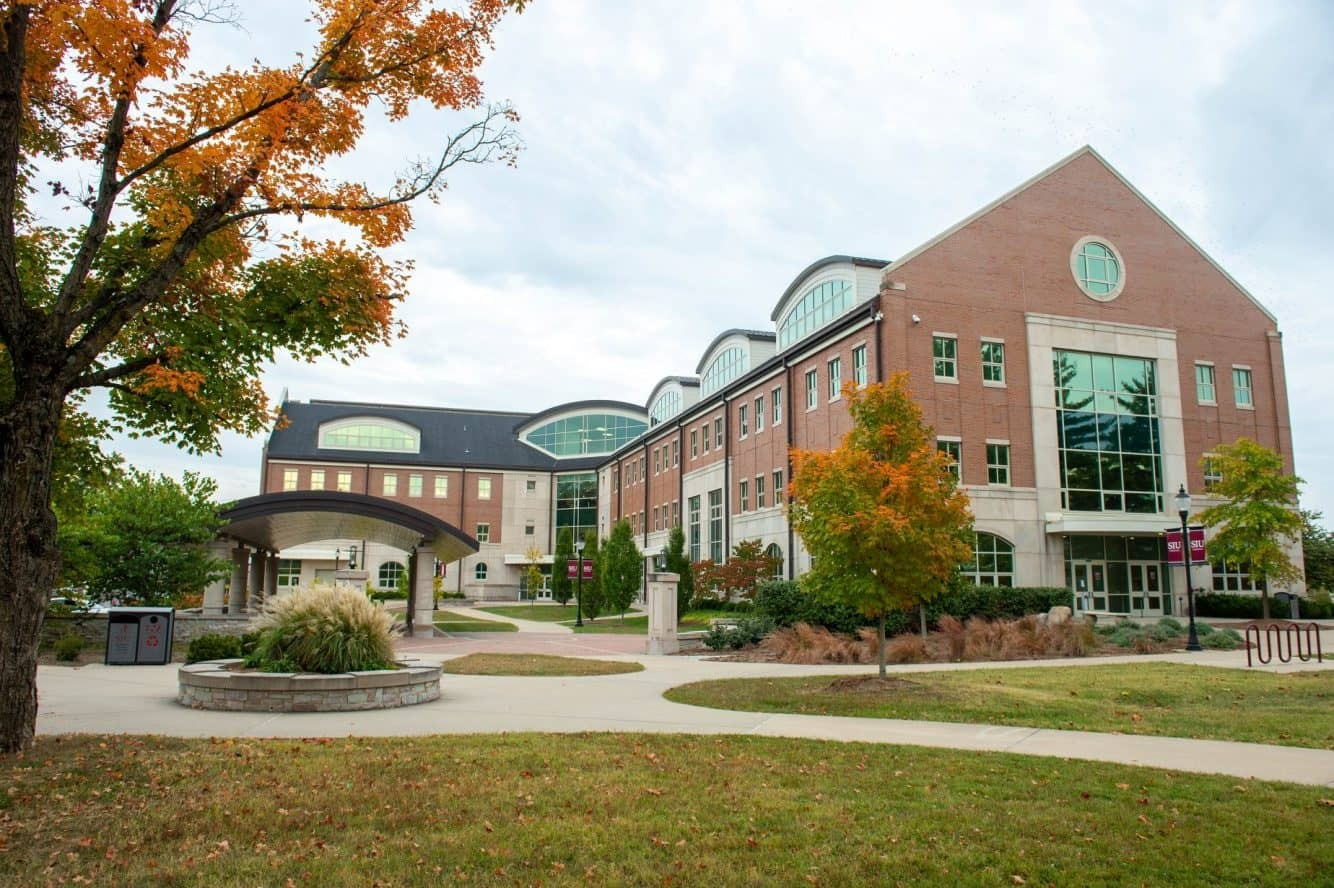
Student Services Building

The Student Services Building contains most of the university's student-related offices. Spread across four floors, students have easy access to help and consultation from advisors at the Undergraduate Admissions Office, Graduate School, Financial Aid Office, University Housing, Career Development Center, and numerous other offices.

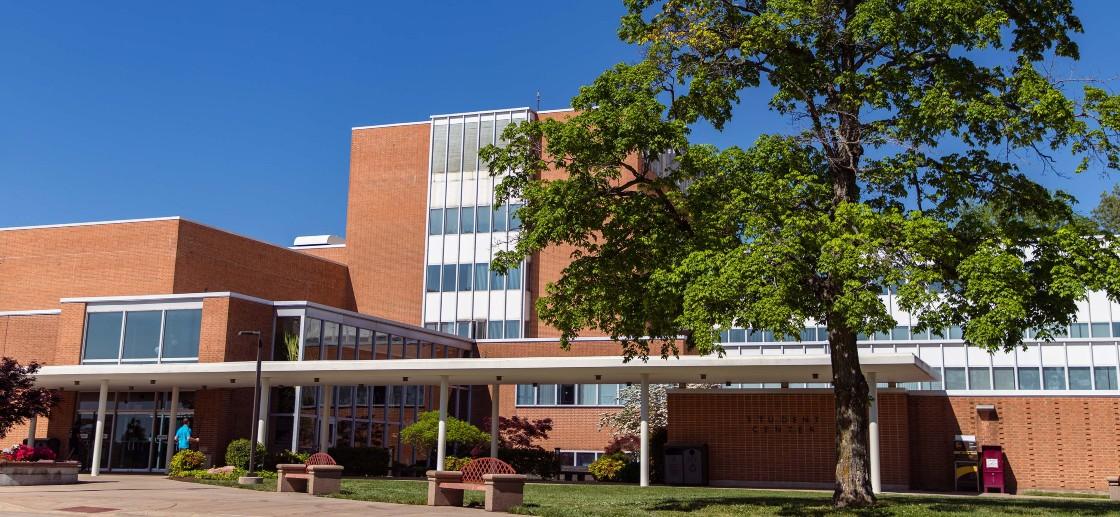
Student Center

The Student Center is a large building near the center of campus which serves as a hub for events held by students and community members. Containing over eight and a half acres of space, the building hosts food vendors, dining and study spaces, a bowling alley and pool room, Esports Arena, the University Bookstore, Sustainability Hub, the Craft Shop, and the Saluki Food Pantry. It is the former home of the WIDB 104.3 FM student-run radio station. It is also the main meeting space for most of SIU's RSOs, as well as the Black Affairs Office, International Student Council, Student Programming Council, and both student governments.

The Student Recreation Center, or "Rec," is the university's primary hub for intramural and fitness activities. Most of the Rec's budget is raised by a student recreation fee included in students' fees, meaning individual students do not need to pay for entrance or membership. Other revenue generated by instructional programs, camps, and community citizens who pay for membership. Indoor facilities include an Olympic-sized pool, areas for basketball, volleyball, racquetball, handball, and squash, a two-story running track, rooms for weightlifting, martial arts, and aerobics, and programs for the disabled.

The Student Health Center is connected to the Student Recreation Center on the east side of campus. The 57,000-square-foot health center offers a medical clinic, pharmacy, wellness resources, psychiatry clinic, sports medicine and physical therapy, and counseling and psychological services. Community partners Southern Illinois Dermatology and the Marion Eye Center also provide services.

=== Instructional and research facilities ===
The majority of SIU's instructional and research facilities are enclosed on or within Lincoln Drive, which circles the university's main campus on three sides before connecting with South Illinois Avenue. As the university expanded, new buildings with similar academic purposes to existing buildings were often added in the same location. As such, most students of any of SIU's constituent colleges will only ever use a few of SIU's main buildings.

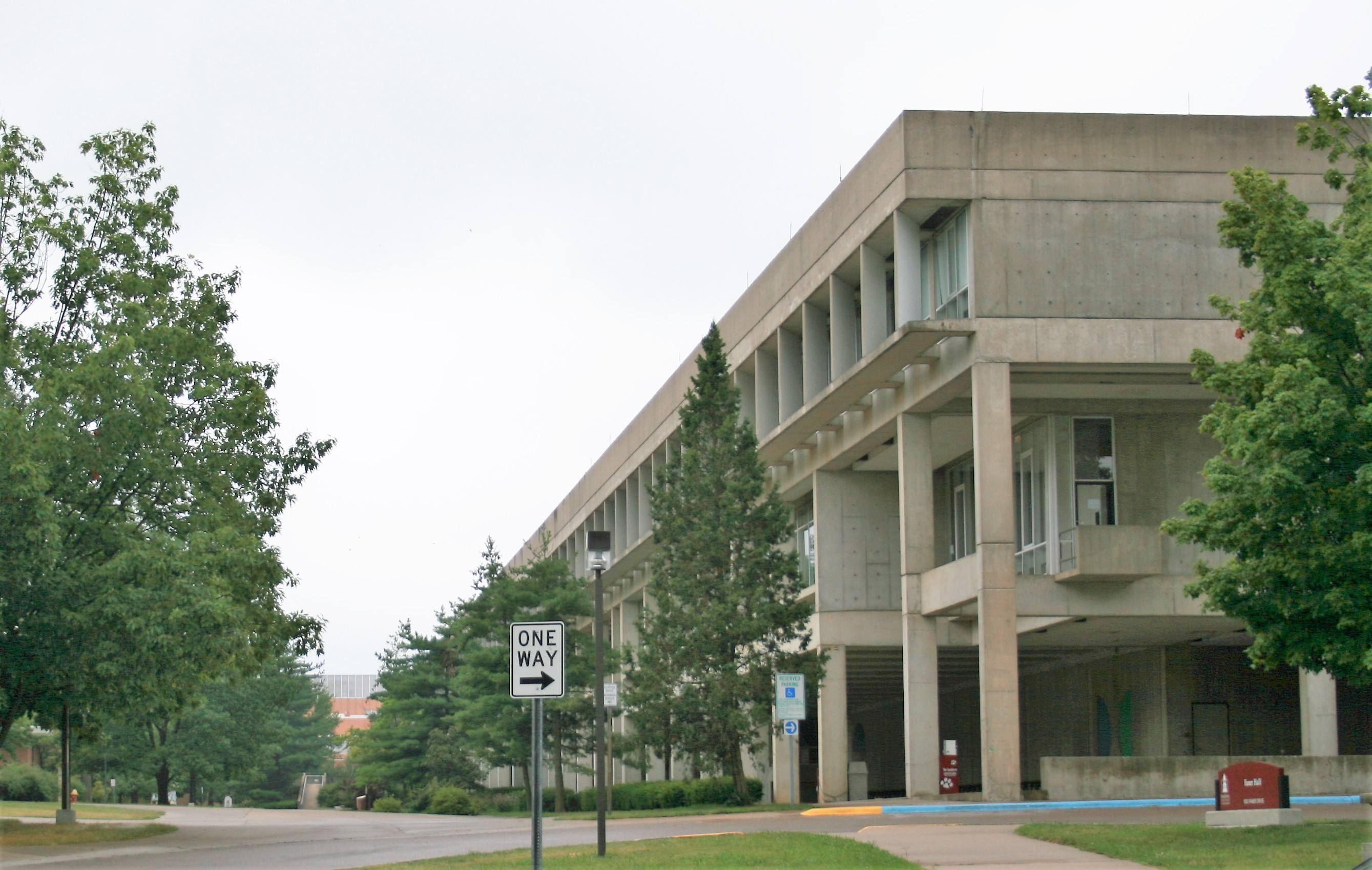
Faner Hall from the northwest side

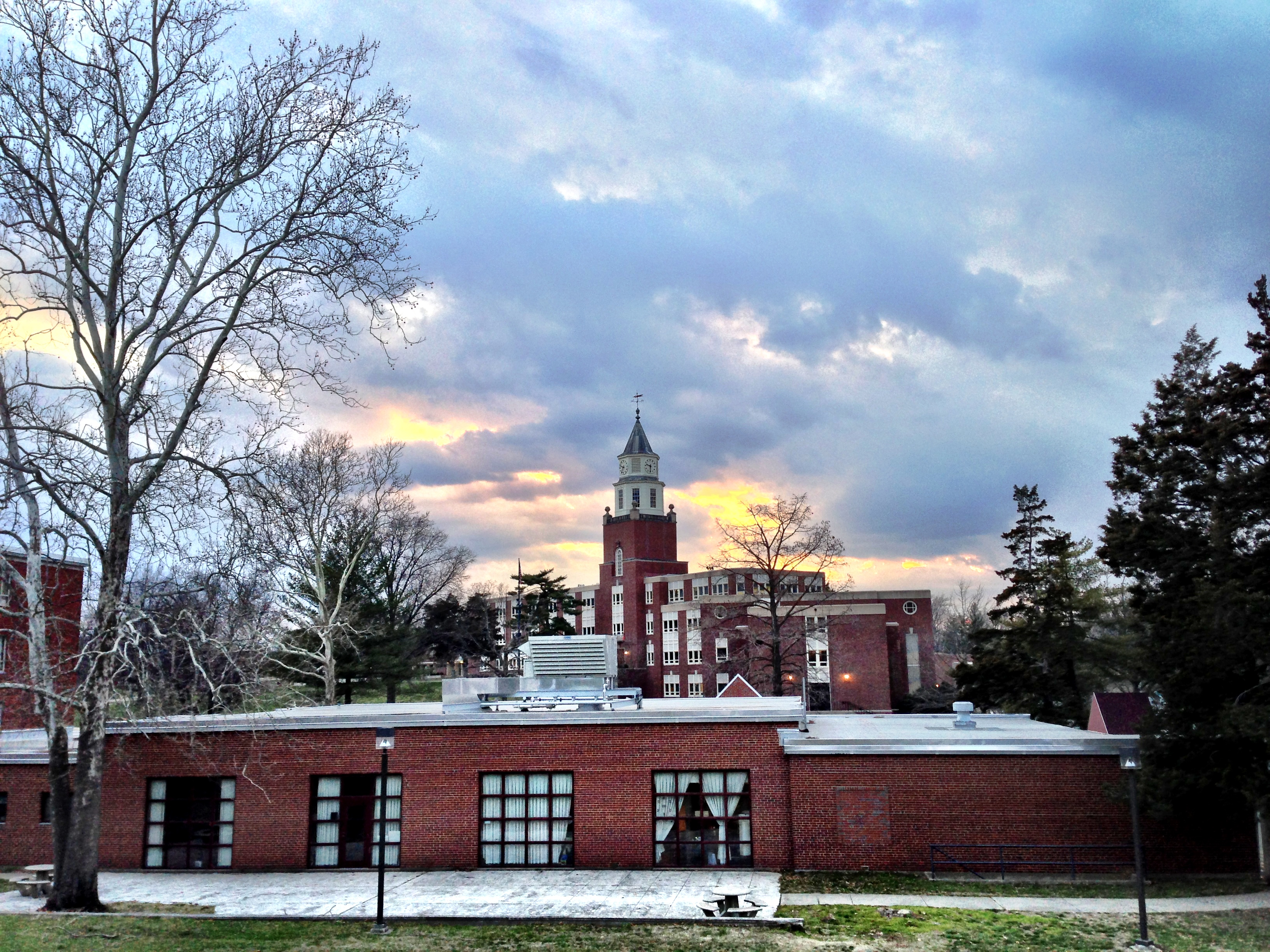
Pulliam Hall as seen from the Center for International Education

One of the more recognizable buildings on campus is Pulliam Hall, the home of the School of Education and the location of SIU's iconic clock tower. Pulliam was once known as Carbondale University High School, a functioning high school which served to train teachers. The College of Business occupies nearby Rehn Hall. The Neckers Building, Engineering Building, and Applied Sciences and Arts Building contain most of the university's physical and chemical laboratories as well as lecture halls. The Neckers Building hosts several large telescopes, facilitating regular viewings of astronomical events. The College of Liberal Arts primarily occupies Faner Hall, whose design and size have made it a controversial symbol of the campus. Allegations that Faner was built to be riot-proof are likely apocryphal; however it is true that Faner is almost thirty feet longer than the Titanic. Faner is also the home of the University Museum which holds over 70,000 unique artifacts ranging from local history to original renaissance tapestries. Students of the agricultural sciences will spend their time in the Agricultural Building, which boasts an award-winning flower display and living wall. Students in the media arts occupy the Communications Building, which hosts the annual McLeod Summer Playhouse. SIU's Law School is situated in the Lesar Law Building at the extreme west end of the campus.

All of the buildings on the main campus are connected by footpaths, interspersed with small parks and green areas. More heavily trafficked paths are lit up with brighter lighting at night as a safety feature. Students who choose to drive on campus will need to purchase a parking sticker from SIU's Parking Division or else park at the pay station lot in front of the Student Center. Walking or biking is the preferred method of transport on-campus, although Carbondale and SIU entered into an agreement with Veo Scooters in 2022 to bring electric scooters to the campus during warmer months.

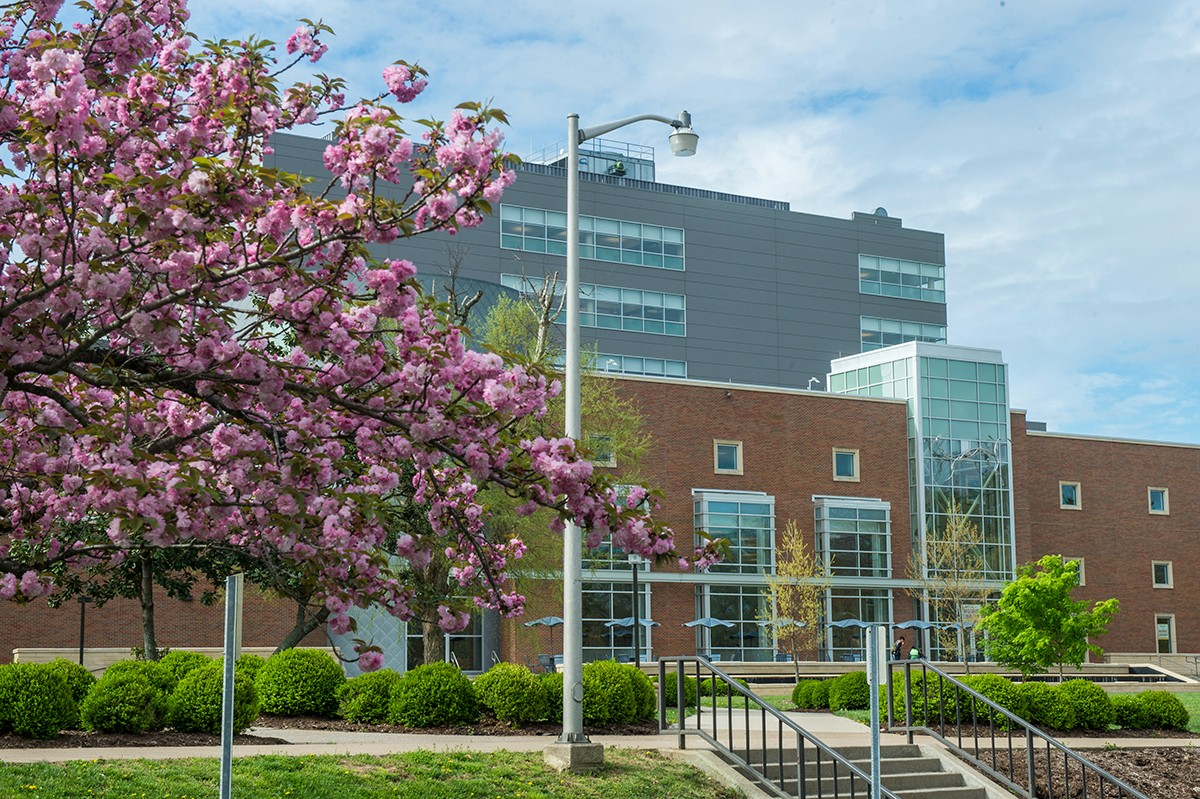
Morris Library

Morris Library is the main library for the Southern Illinois University Carbondale campus. The library holds over five million volumes, 63,000 current periodicals and serials, and over 3.6 million microform units. It also provides access to the statewide automated library system (I-Share) and an array of online collections such as The Lancet, JSTOR, and The Oxford Dictionary of National Biography. The library is a member of the Consortium of Academic and Research Libraries in Illinois, Association of Research Libraries, and the Greater Western Library Alliance. SIU's Special Collections Research Center, which holds unique and rare historical artifacts, and the Geospatial Resources area, which holds over 255,000 maps and 93,000 aerial photographs, are maintained in the library. The library is a registered depository for Illinois, U.S. Federal, and United Nations documents. Delyte's, a coffee shop named after former SIU President Delyte W. Morris, operates near the entrance of the library.

=== Old campus ===
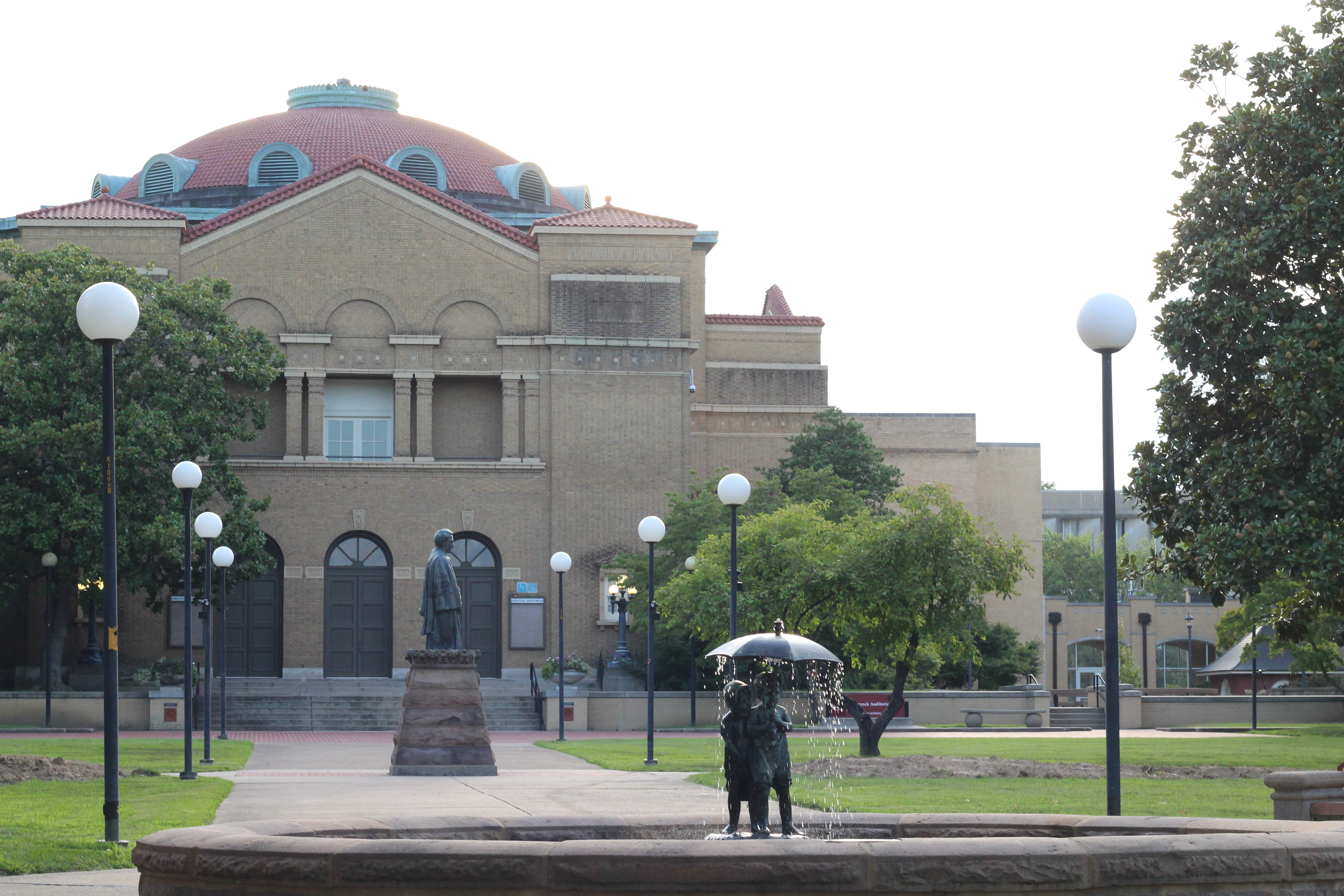
Shryock Auditorium

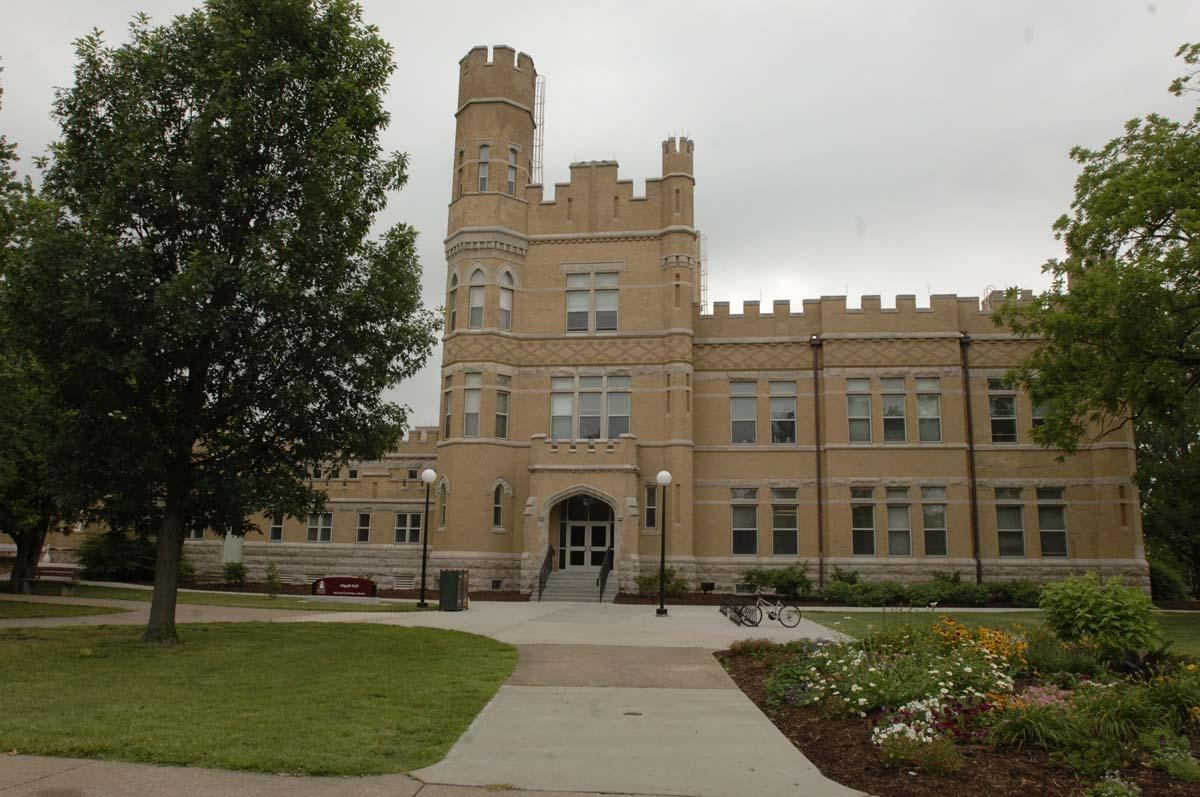
Altgeld Hall

SIU's "First Building" was chartered in 1869 and completed in 1874. This building burned in 1883 and was replaced by a building known as "Old Main", which itself burned in 1969. While arson related to Vietnam War unrest continues to be suspected as the primary cause for the 1969 fire, this theory has never been conclusively proven. This second building was never replaced, and a rectangular green space remains where it once stood. This space is surrounded by some of the university's earliest buildings, most of which were built throughout the early 1900s. Collectively, this area of campus is known as "Old Campus".

To the east of the former site of Old Main is Davies Hall and Wheeler Hall, the latter of which served as SIU's library until the construction of the original Morris Library. On the west side is Altgeld Hall, Shryock Auditorium, and the Allyn Building. Altgeld Hall, which served as the university's science and astronomy building before being given to the School of Music, is affectionately known as "The Castle" due to its distinctive design. Similar buildings exist on four other Illinois university campuses, having been built with the funding and direction of Illinois governor John Altgeld. Shryock Auditorium is a large performance hall capped by an iconic domed roof, which was once made entirely of stained glass. The Auditorium was completed in 1918 and is named for SIU's fifth President, Henry Shryock. On the south side of the old campus area is Anthony Hall and Parkinson Laboratory. Anthony Hall was the university's first permanent dormitory structure; today it serves as an administrative office for executive staff. Being a women's dormitory, it is named in honor of Susan B. Anthony. Parkinson Laboratory is named for the university's fourth president, Daniel Parkinson, and has served continuously as the home of SIU's geology department.

Near the Old Campus area is the Old Baptist Foundation building and Woody Hall. The former building is now used as a recital hall and the meeting place of SIU's musical fraternity, while the latter building was completed in the early 1950s to take over Anthony Hall's role as SIU's permanent women's dormitory. Woody Hall today serves as an administrative office space and alumni center.

=== Natural scenery ===
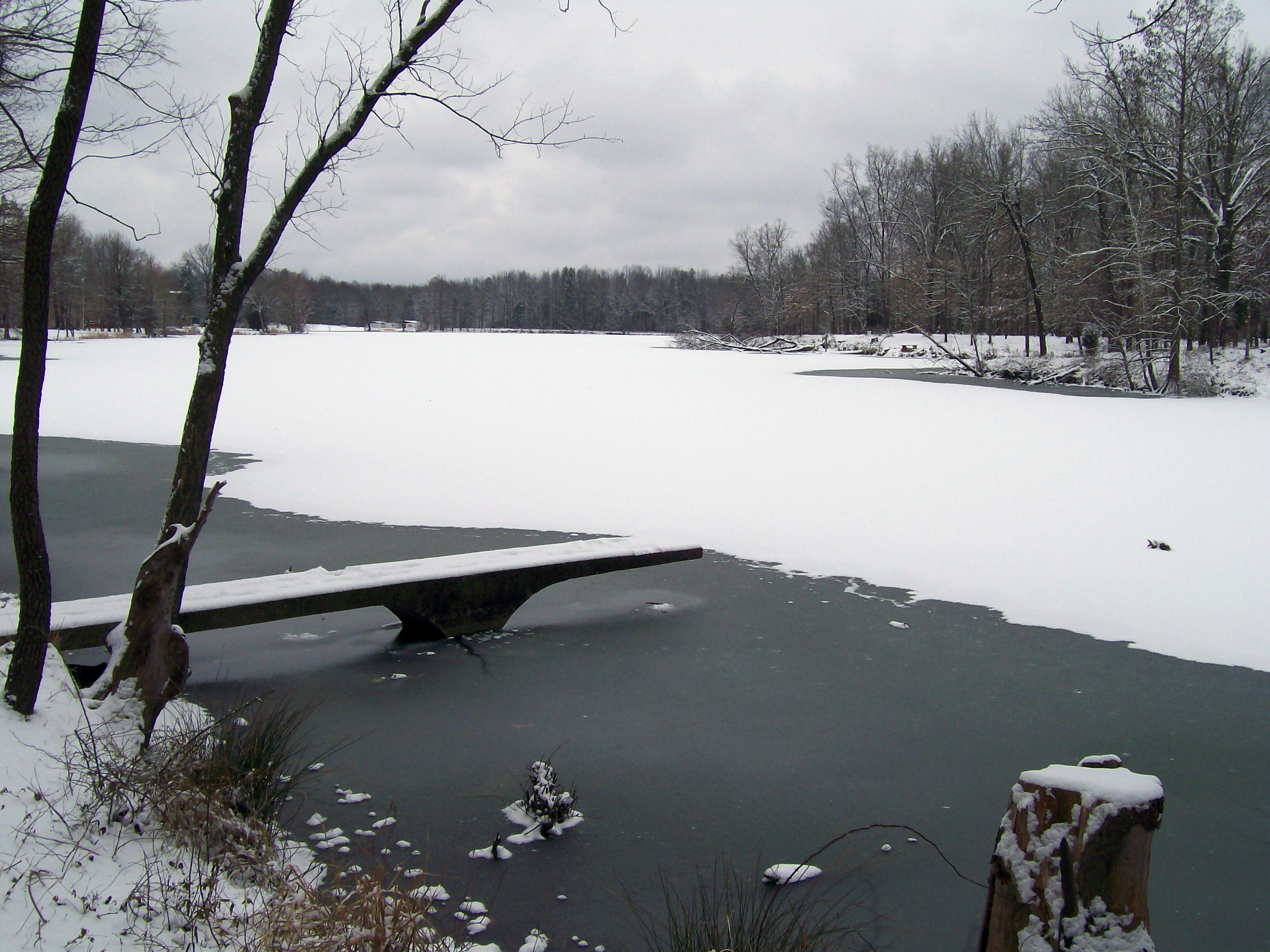
Campus Lake during the winter

SIU's campus has been recognized for its natural beauty. The most striking natural feature of the university is Campus Lake, formerly Thompson Lake, which is a 40-acre spring lake at the southwest end of the campus. The lake has been closed to swimmers for several years due to health concerns, but remains open to canoes and kayaks. In addition to this, the lake is ringed by a 2.2-mile walking trail popular with joggers and a large frisbee golf course. At the center of the campus is Thompson Woods, an area of natural woodlands crisscrossed by walking paths. The Thompson Woods is a completely natural area which was given to the university as a gift from the eponymous Thompson family, which once owned the woods and surrounding campus areas.

The Dorothy Morris Garden, Kumakura Garden, and Sculpture Garden are a collection of small gardens behind Faner hall. They include a tea house, fish pond, and numerous student-created sculptures. The gardens are located roughly on the former site of the home of Dorothy and Delyte Morris, SIU's eighth president. SIU's Rinella Field, a large green area in front of the East Campus residential area, is named after former Director of Housing Samuel Rinella. The field is often used for impromptu soccer matches as well as SIU's Quidditch team.

SIU's campus is located near Giant City State Park, Shawnee National Forest, and several other areas popular for hiking and camping. The campus also maintains a tagged category of its diverse tree inventory, which includes a rare Dawn Redwood planted in 1950 by William Marberry.

=== Former facilities ===
There are a number of derelict facilities on or related to the SIU campus which can still be visited by students. Just west of the Thompson Point housing area sits the remains of the Small Group Housing area, otherwise known as Greek Row. The set of two-story housing structures was originally built to provide safe housing space for the university's growing fraternities and sororities, but this system largely collapsed in later decades. Southern Hills, another abandoned housing area, can be found just south of the East Campus towers along Logan Dr.

Further south of the university at the meeting of E. Pleasant Hill Road and S. Wall St. is the abandoned Marberry Arboretum. Known today by students as the "Bamboo Forest" due to its abundance of overgrown bamboo, the Marberry Arboretum was once owned by SIU faculty member William Marberry. The site contains a wide variety of plant species, but has not been regularly maintained by the Carbondale City Council.

Two completely demolished sites include the blue barracks and the Vocational Technical Institute.

== Organization and administration ==
Colleges and schools
College of Agricultural, Life, and Physical Sciences	1972
College of Arts and Media	2021
College of Business and Analytics	1957
College of Engineering, Computing, Technology, and Mathematics	1979
College of Health and Human Sciences	2020
College of Liberal Arts	1943
Graduate School	1943
School of Education	1943
School of Law	1972
School of Medicine	1970

Systems of administration at SIU have greatly evolved since the university's earliest days. The growth of the university after the appointment of president Delyte Morris led to shorter tenures and a speedier succession of leaders. Many of SIU's chancellors after this period were selected to serve in an interim capacity, a problem which persists in limited cases to this day. The early deaths of chancellors Paul D. Sarvela and Carlo Montemagno only exacerbated this issue. The hiring of Austin Lane to fill the position of chancellor in 2020 ended the succession issues that began after chancellor Rita Cheng left to become president of Northern Arizona University.

The discrepancy between the titles of president and chancellor began after the founding of Southern Illinois University Edwardsville in 1957, along with the proliferation of associated schools and programs that were created under the tenure of SIU President Delyte Morris. Currently, both SIU Carbondale and SIU Edwardsville are led by chancellors, who in turn report to the president of the Southern Illinois University System. The current SIU System President is Daniel F. Mahoney.

Many of the buildings on the SIU campus are named after former presidents and chancellors. These include the Allyn Building, the Parkinson Laboratory, the Shryock Auditorium, the Pulliam Hall and the Pulliam Industrial Education Building, the Morris Library, the Hiram H. Lesar Law Building, and the Guyon Auditorium in Morris Library.

== Academics ==
Academic rankings

National
- U.S. News & World Report: 288
- WSJ/College Pulse: 430

SIU offers 120 undergraduate majors, with more than 200 specializations, and over 100 minors. Its programs also include 80 master's degrees and 40 doctoral degrees, in addition to professional degrees in law and medicine. The university provides general and professional training ranging from two-year associate degrees to doctoral programs, as well as certificate and non-degree programs meeting the needs of those uninterested in degree education.

SIU enrolls students from all 50 US states and over 100 other nations. The university is classified among "R1: Doctoral Universities – Very High research activity". In 2022, The Princeton Review included SIU Carbondale among its "Best of the Midwest".

=== Curriculum ===
The various colleges, schools, and academic departments which make up SIU have been reorganized and renamed countless times since the university's founding. SIU's original designation as a teachers' college, or normal school, means many of its current academic programs can trace their establishment to a period before the creation of the college they belong to today. Only the College of Liberal Arts can trace an unbroken lineage to the year SIU was officially granted limited university status in 1943.

The College of Agricultural, Life, and Physical Sciences, and the College of Health and Human Sciences were created from the now-defunct College of Science, College of Agriculture, and College of Applied Science and Arts. The College of Engineering, Computing, Technology, and Math was originally created as the College of Engineering and Technology; the result of a protracted effort to create an independent engineering college. The most recent reordering occurred when the College of Mass Communications and Media Arts became the College of Arts and Media.

The College of Agricultural, Life, and Physical Sciences consists of six constituent schools and several pre-health professional programs. It is based in the Agricultural Building, which was constructed in 1957. The college offers experiential opportunities for students in the form of a 2,000+ acre working farm, tree improvement center, and other hands-on activities. SIU is the only public university in Illinois to offer a zoology program, and one of only two to offer programs in botany and microbiology.

The College of Arts and Media consists of six constituent schools, including the School of Architecture, School of Art and Design, School of Arts and Media, School of Music, and School of Journalism and Advertising. As a mixture of liberal arts and digital humanities, the College of Arts and Media combines practical education with programs catering to creative pursuits. SIU offers a number of programs associated with College of Arts and Media students, including the McLeod Summer Playhouse theatre series, the Southern Illinois Symphony Orchestra, and SIU's student newspaper, The Daily Egyptian.

The College of Business and Analytics consists of three constituent schools, focusing on three major areas of academic focus for the college: the School of Accountancy, the School of Analytics, Finance, and Economics, and the School of Management and Marketing. Due to its association with the College of Liberal Arts, the School of Analytics, Finance, and Economics offers a B.A. degree in economics, one of only a few B.S. programs at SIU to also offer a B.A. option. The college offers numerous research facilities, including a trading floor equipped with Bloomberg terminals. The Saluki Student Investment Fund, a student organization directed by the college, manages a $3.8 million portfolio for the university. The college also offers an online M.B.A. program that was ranked #58 in the nation in 2023.

The College of Engineering, Computing, Technology, and Mathematics consists of six constituent schools with a wide range of national accreditation. The college is housed in a modern four-building engineering complex located near Campus Lake. The college is one of the few institutions in the United States to offer a concurrent masters with a J.D. degree in Electrical and Computer Engineering and Law. Students in the School of Computing can choose between a B.A. and a B.S. degree in Computer Science, with the option to focus on Graphic Design and/or Game Design and Development by completing a joint minor with the College of Arts and Media.

The College of Health and Human Sciences consists of six constituent schools, with programs ranging from the School of Aviation, School of Automotive, Allied Health, to the School of Justice and Public Safety as well as the School of Psychological and Behavioral Sciences. SIU's School of Aviation, which maintains separate facilities at the Transportation Education Center along with the school of Automotive near Southern Illinois Airport, hosts the nationally recognized Flying Salukis.

The College of Liberal Arts consists of six constituent schools. The college's programs are augmented with faculty-sponsored research experiences, the ability to mix and match majors and minors to suit preferences and needs, access to internships, study abroad opportunities, and the university honors program. Most of the college's classrooms and offices are found in Faner Hall.

== Student life ==
Undergraduate demographics as of Fall 2023
Race and ethnicity	Total
White	66%
Black	17%
Hispanic	10%
Two or more races	4%
Asian	2%
International student	2%
Economic diversity
Low-income (Note: The percentage of students who received an income-based federal Pell grant intended for low-income students.)	37%
Affluent (Note: The percentage of students who are a part of the American middle class at the bare minimum.)	63%

SIU has a vibrant student culture and is home to more than 300 registered student organizations (RSOs). Student groups include honor societies, sports clubs, fraternities and sororities, religious organizations, student governments, and other special interest groups. The largest RSO on campus is the Student Programming Council, which organizes events such as concerts, comedy shows, lectures, film showings, and homecoming celebrations.

=== Student housing ===
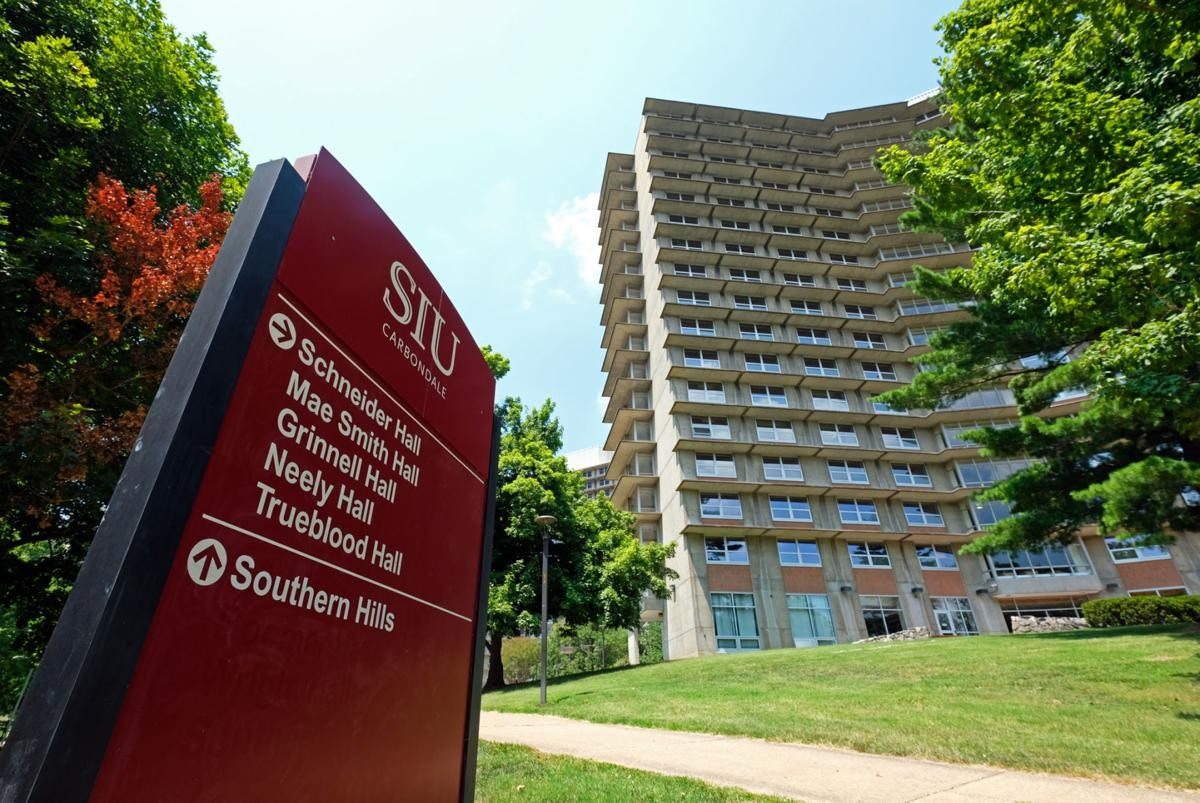
A view of Schneider Hall on East Campus

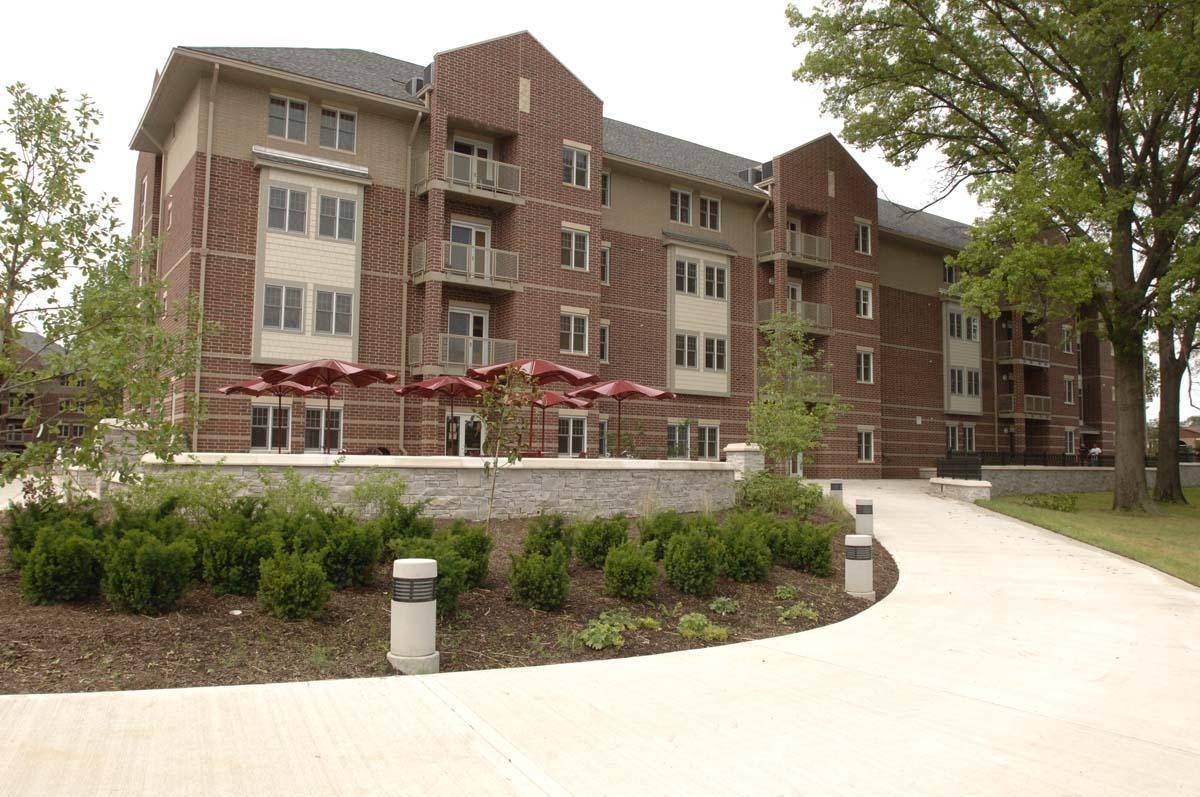
Wall & Grand student apartments

On-campus housing at SIU has developed steadily from the completion of a second women's dormitory in 1953 to the expansive system of tower blocks and apartment buildings that exists today. Housing is provided in residence halls and apartments both on and near campus. Different housing opportunities are offered to undergraduates, graduates, international students, parents, and married couples.

The two main residence hall areas are known as East Campus and West Campus. West Campus, also known as Thompson Point, consists of 11 three-story dormitory structures and was built between 1957 and 1962. East Campus, also known as the Brush Towers, consists of 3 seventeen-story high rises and was built between 1965 and 1968. Each site also includes a commons building and dining hall. The traditional housing contract includes a furnished room, WiFi, utilities, and a dining plan. Residence hall rooms are fully furnished, and many have been modified to meet the needs of specific types of disability. Apartment housing is available at Evergreen Terrace, Wall & Grand, and Elizabeth Apartments. Evergreen Terrace is specifically earmarked for students with dependent children.

All single students under the age of 21, not residing with their parents or legal guardians, with fewer than 26 credit hours earned after high school are required to live in University-owned and operated residence halls per university policy. This policy can be circumvented if the student is living in the permanent home of a parent or guardian, provided the home is within 60 miles of campus. Furthermore, university apartment housing is restricted to those students who are married, parents, graduate students, or who are over the age of 21; the effect of this policy means that freshmen and sophomore students often live in dormitories, while older students reside in on and off-campus apartments.

K-12 school zoning for Evergreen Terrace is as follows: Unity Point Community Consolidated School District 140, and Carbondale Community High School District 165.

=== Student government ===
SIU has two primary bodies of student government responsible for advising the SIU administration on student needs. The student governments are also responsible for distributing funds collected from the student activity fee to eligible RSOs. The two student governments are the Undergraduate Student Government (USG) and the Graduate and Professional Student Council (GPSC). Additionally, one student is elected as a student trustee and appointed by the governor to serve as a voting member of the SIU Board of Trustees.

=== Greek life ===
SIU is home to 17 registered fraternities and 10 registered sororities, including 7 multicultural fraternities and sororities. The Greek organizations are governed by the Interfraternity Council, The College Panhellenic Association, The Multicultural Greek Council, and the National Pan-Hellenic Council. They are responsible to the dean of students and the Office of Student Affairs. Popular events held by Greek organizations include the Go Greek Barbecue and the annual "Greek Sing" talent contest.

All members of the Greek organizations at SIU must maintain a 2.0 GPA or higher to be members. The university rigorously restricts hazing and discriminatory induction practices. The first fraternity and sorority appeared on SIU's campus in 1923, although the introduction, chartering, and growth of many of the Greek groups on-campus today occurred during or after the 1940s.

=== Student newspaper ===
SIU's student-run newspaper, The Daily Egyptian, has been printed without interruption since the spring of 1921. The Daily Egyptian is published weekly in print and online during the fall and spring semesters. It has a distribution of 7,800 copies and reaches nearly 200 locations. The paper has received more than 25 awards from the Illinois College Press Association. In 2002 it received the National Newspaper Pacemaker Award for General Excellence, and in 2017 and 2018 it received the National Online Pacemaker Award. The Daily Egyptian was one of only a few university newspapers in the United States to own and operate its own printing press. The press was retired in 2015 after nearly 50 years of continuous service.

Gus Bode, a cartoon character created to give satirical commentary on the paper's articles, has appeared regularly in the paper since 1956.

Past editions of The Daily Egyptian and other SIU student newspapers going back to 1888 are maintained on campus by Morris Library.

=== Saluki patrol ===
Founded in 1959, the Saluki Patrol is one of the oldest student security teams in the country. Organized as a form of community policing, the Saluki Patrol assists the Department of Public Safety in their duties by performing foot patrols, conducting traffic enforcement, and serving as crowd control. Members of the Saluki Patrol can often be seen on-campus in the evenings and at major on-campus sporting events.

The Saluki Patrol has continued to evolve and become more professional, with personnel receiving some of the same police training as sworn officers. Many leaders in the law enforcement community both locally and at the state and federal level began their careers as a Saluki Patrol.

=== Cardboard boat regatta ===
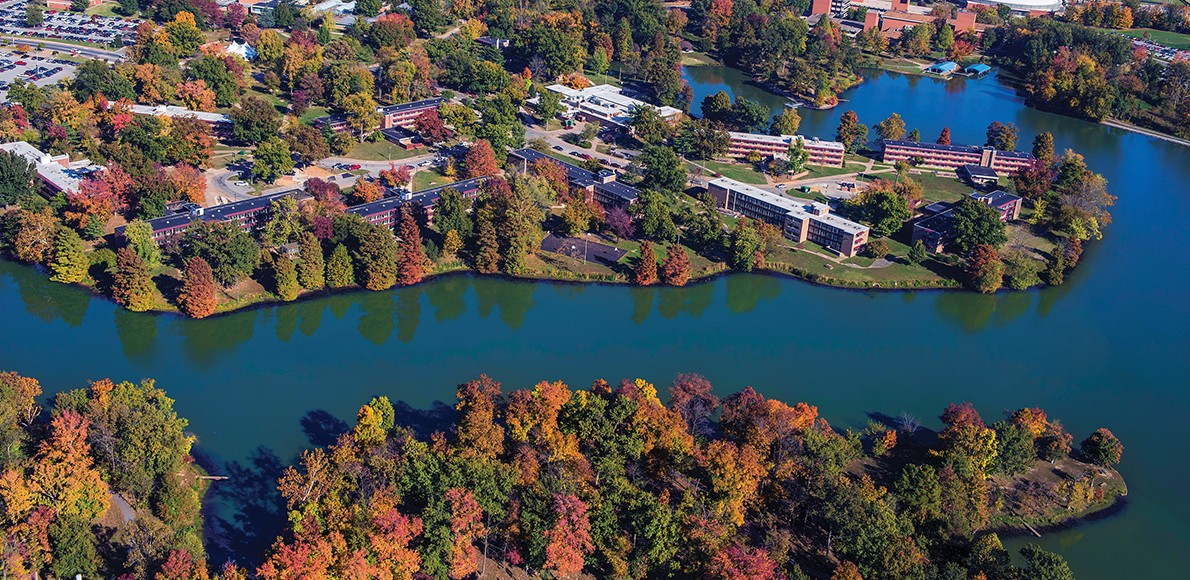
Campus Lake with a view towards Thompson Point (top)

The Great Cardboard Boat Regatta is an event held every spring semester at Campus Lake. Participants include university students and community members. The goal is to complete three trips around a 200-yard course on the lake using makeshift cardboard boats. There are three different categories for entries: canoes or kayaks, experimental boats, and instant boats (boats created on-site the day of the event).

"Commodore" Richard Archer, a professor of Art and Design, created the regatta as a final examination for students in his freshman design class in 1974. Archer was inspired by Buckminster Fuller, then a distinguished professor at SIU, who had espoused the principle of "doing the most with the least." Participation peaked in the late 1980s and 90s, drawing crowds upwards of 20,000 people and receiving coverage on CNN's Good Morning America.

=== Saluki startup and weeks of welcome ===
The Saluki Startup & Weeks of Welcome are held during the first five weeks of the fall semester and include a range of activities designed to introduce new students to campus. Events include job fairs, theater and orchestra auditions, a pep rally, paint and sips, concerts, RSO fairs, a pickleball tournament, board game nights, and organized meetups between the students and faculty of each college.

These events coincide with the DuQuoin State Fair and the annual football game between SIU and SEMO, called the "War for the Wheel". Both of these events are attended by SIU students as part of the Weeks of Welcome.

=== Competitive teams and professional student organizations ===
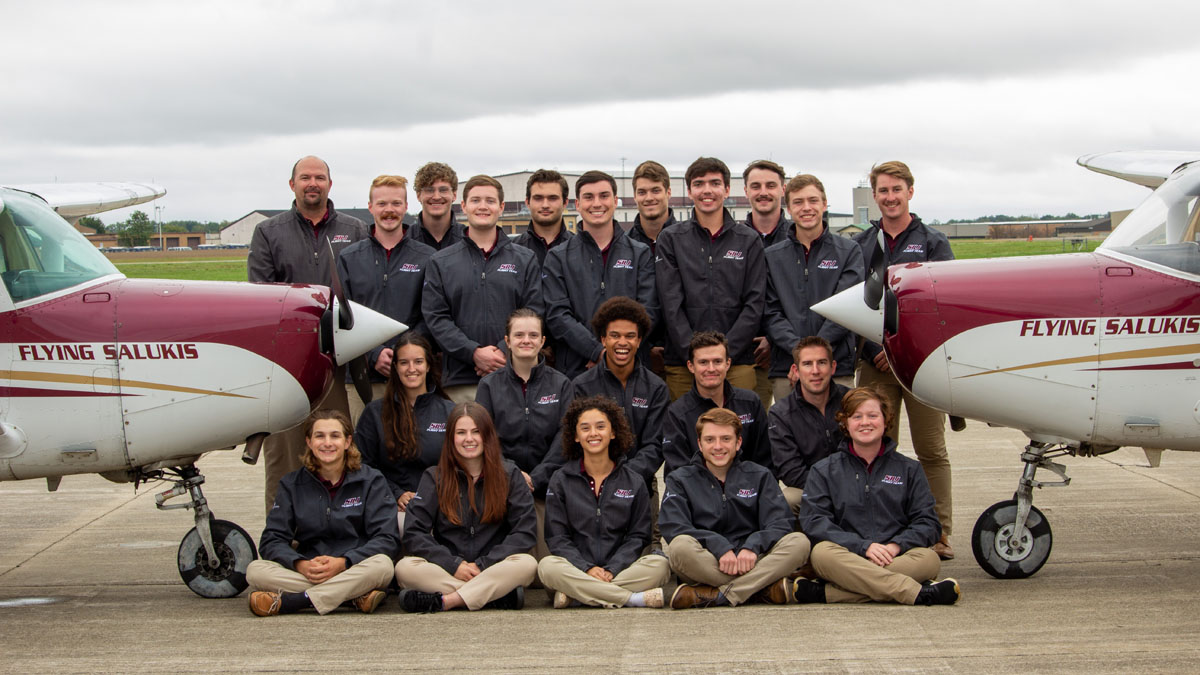
The 2021 Flying Salukis

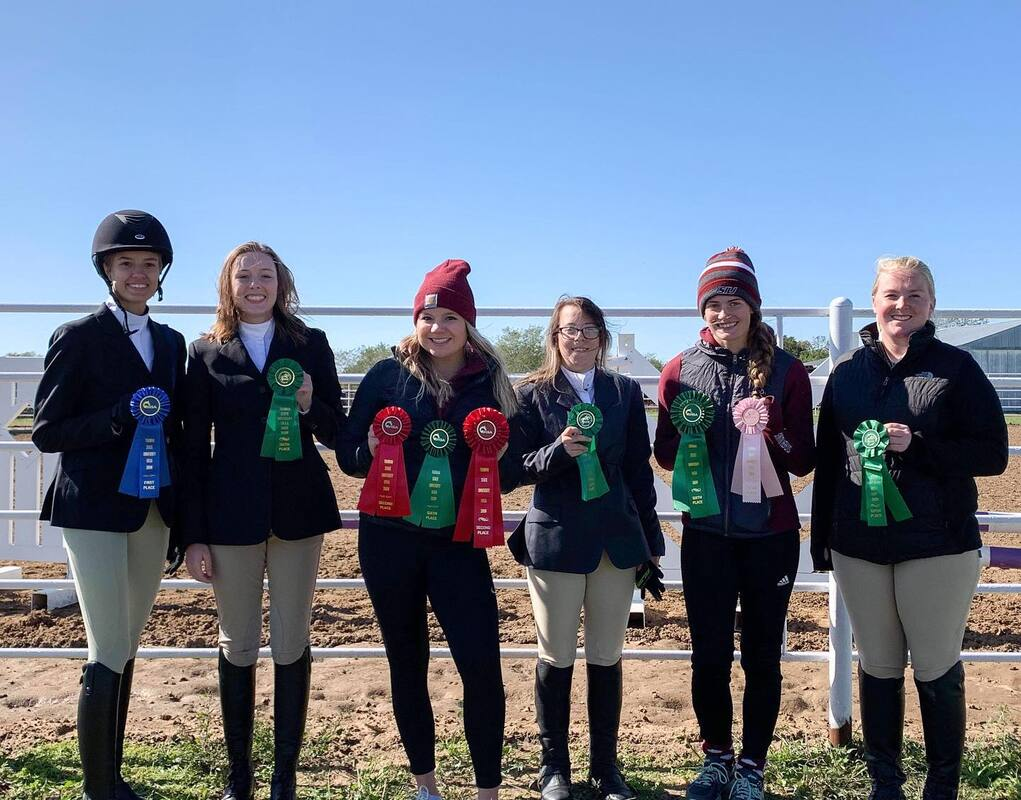
The Equestrian Team displaying medals

- Flying Salukis Flight Team – The Flying Salukis is a competitive flight teams. They took first place in the National Intercollegiate Flying Association (NIFA) – regional competition for 7 consecutive years (2011-2017). At the NIFA national championships in 2015, the Flying Salukis won the team's ninth national title. The team has consistently beaten or tied other nationally ranked schools, including the United States Air Force Academy. As of 2017, the team had qualified for the national championships in 49 of the last 50 years.
- Saluki Debate Team – The Saluki Debate Team won the National Parliamentary Tournament of Excellence in 2008, 2013, and 2015. The team also won the National Parliamentary Debate Association National Tournament in 2013 and 2014. They were ranked first in the country over the course of the 2010, 2012, 2013, 2014, and 2015 seasons.
- Alt.news 26:46 – SIU's half-hour alternative TV news magazine. Alt news received an Emmy in the magazine news program category at the 2010 National Academy of Television Arts and Sciences Mid-America Regional Chapter Emmy Awards in St. Louis.
- Forestry Club – SIU's Forestry Club is one of the university's many competitive registered student organizations. The Forestry Club was the STIHL Timbersports Midwestern Forester's Conclave champion every year from 1992 to 2009 and once more in 2017, competing in events such as pulp toss, bolt toss, log roll, and axe throw.
- American Marketing Association Team – SIU's American Marketing Association Team is a registered student organization in the College of Business and Analytics. The team won national recognition in 2020 by competing in the American Marketing Association Collegiate Case Competition.
- Equestrian Team – SIU's Equestrian Team is a registered student organization for students interested in equitation activities. The Equestrian Team competes in many competitions, including those hosted by the Intercollegiate Horse Show Association.
- Rover Team – SIU's Rover or "Moonbuggy" Team is a registered student organization in the College of Engineering Computing, Technology, and Mathematics. The organization competes in the Human Exploration Rover Challenge, previously known as the Moonbuggy Race, sponsored annually by NASA in Huntsville, AL. The team placed in the top ten during the 2016 competition.
- Saluki CFA Challenge Team – The CFA Challenge Team is a group of students chosen to compete in the CFA Institute Research Challenge. The CFA Challenge Team finished in second place at the St. Louis regional competition between 2016 and 2018 and won the competition in 2021.
- Steel Bridge and Concrete Canoe Team – SIU engineering students compete in steel bridge and concrete canoe competitions hosted by the American Society of Civil Engineers and the American Institute of Steel Construction.
- Medieval Combat Club – The Medieval Combat Club is a registered student organization and member of the Belegarth Medieval Combat Society. The club is a full contact combat sport with medieval fantasy inspiration, and competes in competition with other local universities, such as University of Illinois Urbana-Champaign.
- Saluki Student Investment Fund – The Saluki Student Investment Fund provides undergraduate students with hands-on experience in portfolio management and investment research. Since its inception in 2000, the fund has grown to manage well over $3.5 million in assets in 2021.
- Soccer Club - The SIU Soccer Club is a registered student organization and a member of US College Club Soccer. The club competes in competition with other universities.

== Athletics ==
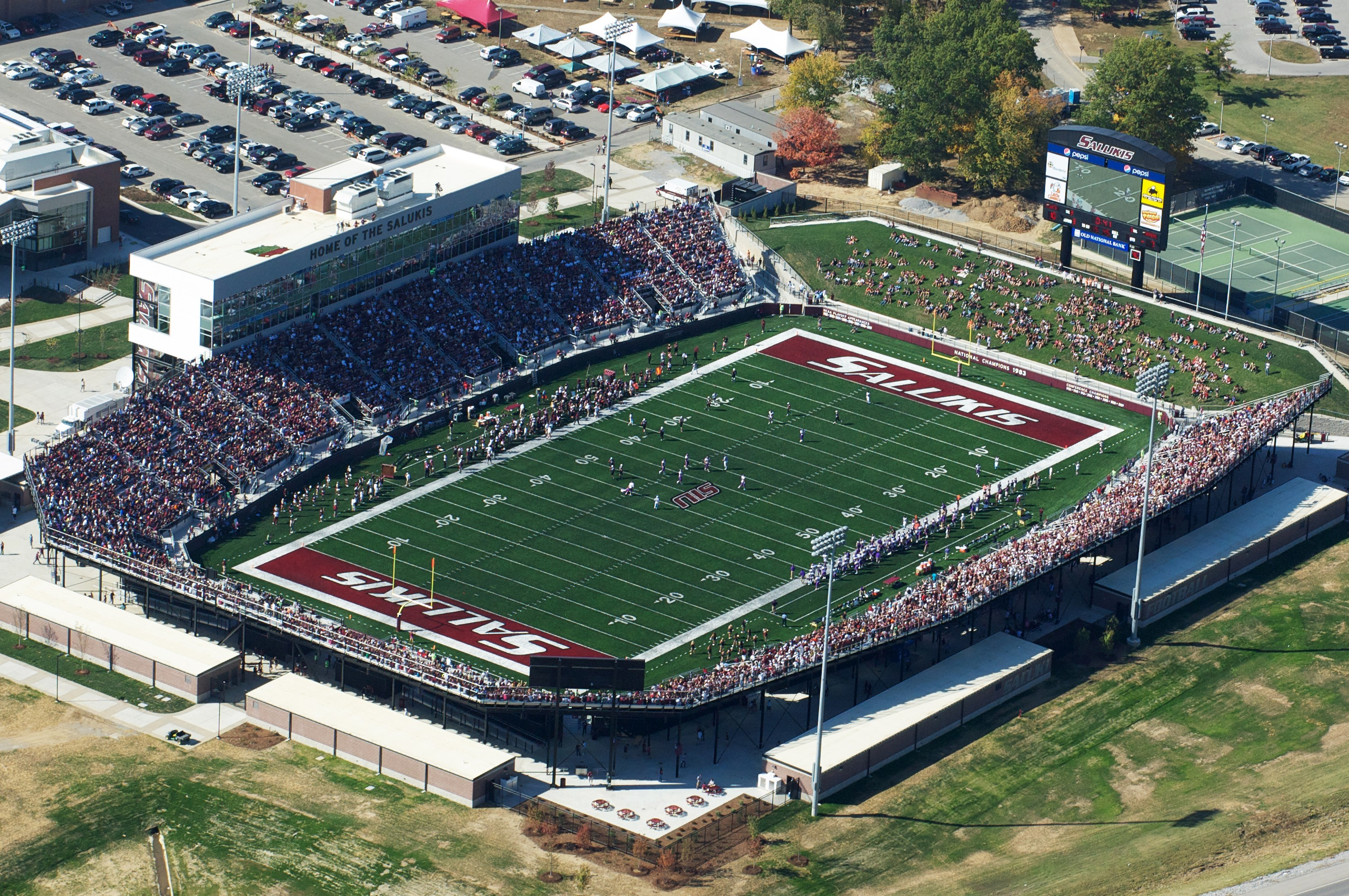
Saluki Stadium Arena

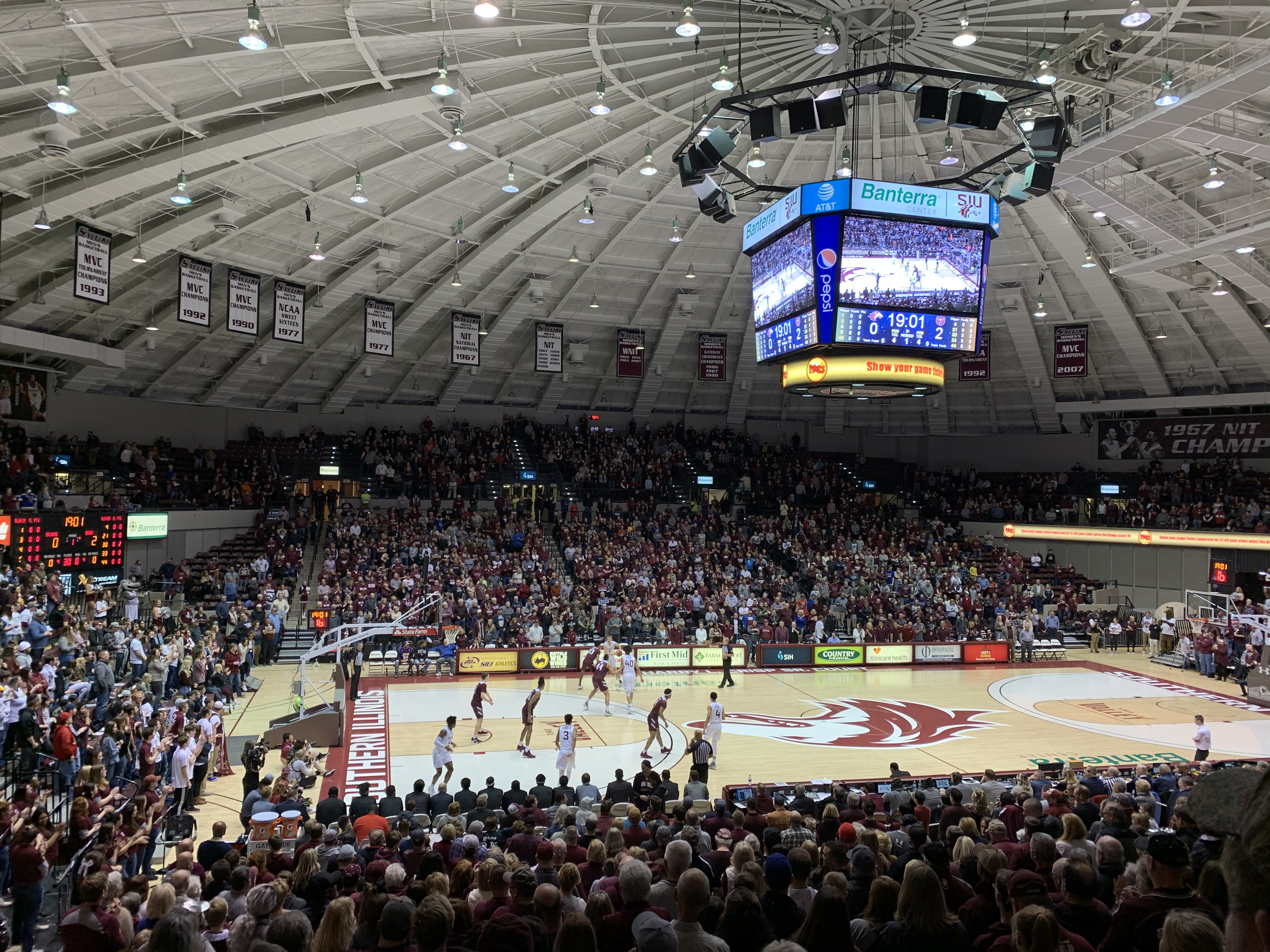
Inside of the Banterra Center

Intercollegiate athletics
Men's teams	Women's teams
Baseball; Basketball; Cross Country; Football; Golf; Swimming & Diving; Track & Field	Basketball; Cross Country; Soccer; Softball; Golf; Swimming & Diving; Track & Field; Volleyball; Tennis

Southern Illinois University's intercollegiate athletic teams are collectively known as the Southern Illinois Salukis. The university first sponsored athletic teams during the 1913–14 school year, when they were informally known as the Maroons. Students and faculty began lobbying for a new name and mascot during the late 1940s. On March 19, 1951, the student body voted to change the official name to the Salukis. The selection of the Saluki, a royal dog of ancient Egypt, as the university's mascot is often attributed to its reputation as a fast and tenacious hunter and the southern Illinois region's colloquial nickname, "Little Egypt". The first women's sports teams were formed in 1959, and all athletics programs were merged in 1988.

SIU is classified as an NCAA Division I school. Most varsity SIU teams compete in the Missouri Valley Conference, specifically in basketball, cross country, golf, softball, women's swimming, women's tennis, track and field, and volleyball. The football program competes in the Missouri Valley Football Conference. Men's swimming and diving is part of the Mid-American Conference.

Between the spring of 2018 and the fall of 2019, SIU athletics was led by three-time national coach-of-the-year Jerry Kill. He was replaced by Liz Jarnigan, who left the university in 2021 amid an alleged cover-up scandal.

=== Athletic highlights ===
- 8 National Championships in men's gymnastics (1963, 1966, 1967, 1972), men's golf (1964), men's tennis (1964), men's basketball (1967, NIT Championship), and football (1983)
- 53 Olympians including 3 silver medalists and 13 top-ten individual finishes
- 102 All-Time CSC Academic All-Americans, leading the Missouri Valley Conference
- 42 NFL players, 9 NBA players, 25 MLB players
- In baseball, finished second place in the National Championship in 1968 and 1971
- In men's basketball, advanced to the NCAA tournament for six straight seasons between 2002 and 2007, including two trips to the Sweet Sixteen
- In women's basketball, was Missouri Valley Conference champions in 2007 and in 2022
- In football, was in the playoffs for seven straight years between 2003 and 2009, and advanced to the quarterfinals of the playoffs four times in five years from 2005 to 2009
- In softball, has thirteen NCAA appearances and six conference championships, the most recent of which occurred in 2021

=== Facilities ===
- Saluki Stadium was opened in 2010 to replace McAndrew Stadium, which had served as SIU's principal football stadium for 73 seasons. The $29.9 million stadium has a seating capacity of over 15,000.
- The Banterra Center, formerly the SIU Arena prior to 2019, is the home of SIU men's and women's basketball. The 8,284-seat arena was built in 1964 and underwent a $30 million renovation in 2010.
- Charlotte West Stadium is SIU's modern softball field and stadium. It was constructed for $1.7 million and opened in 2003. It hosted the Missouri Valley Conference in 2004, 2008, 2012, and 2016.
- Davies Gym was built in 1925 and is located on the original main campus of SIU. The facility has been renovated several times, and is currently the home of SIU's volleyball program.
- The Dr. Edward J. Shea Natatorium opened in 1977 and is one of the most modern facilities in the Missouri Valley Conference. It features a 770,000 gallon Olympic-sized pool with three underwater viewing stations, underwater speakers, Colorado electronic timing system, rapid sand filter system, and a closed gutter filtration system. The pool is located within the Student Recreation Center near campus.
- Richard "Itchy" Jones Stadium opened in 2014 for the use of the Salukis baseball team. The $4.2 million stadium replaced Abe Martin Field, which was built in 1964. The stadium is the first in the United States to install Astro Turf's new 3Di on the base paths. Richard "Itchy" Jones and Abe Martin are both commemorated for their contributions to SIU athletics.
- Lew Hartzog Track & Field Complex opened in 2012 and is located directly next to Itchy Jones Stadium. The complex cost $3.96 million and its multi-event synthetic turf infield can be set to accommodate an NCAA regulation soccer pitch or football field. The field is regularly used by the women's soccer team.

== Notable alumni ==
There are currently over 250,000 alumni of Southern Illinois University Carbondale worldwide. Notable SIU alumni include:

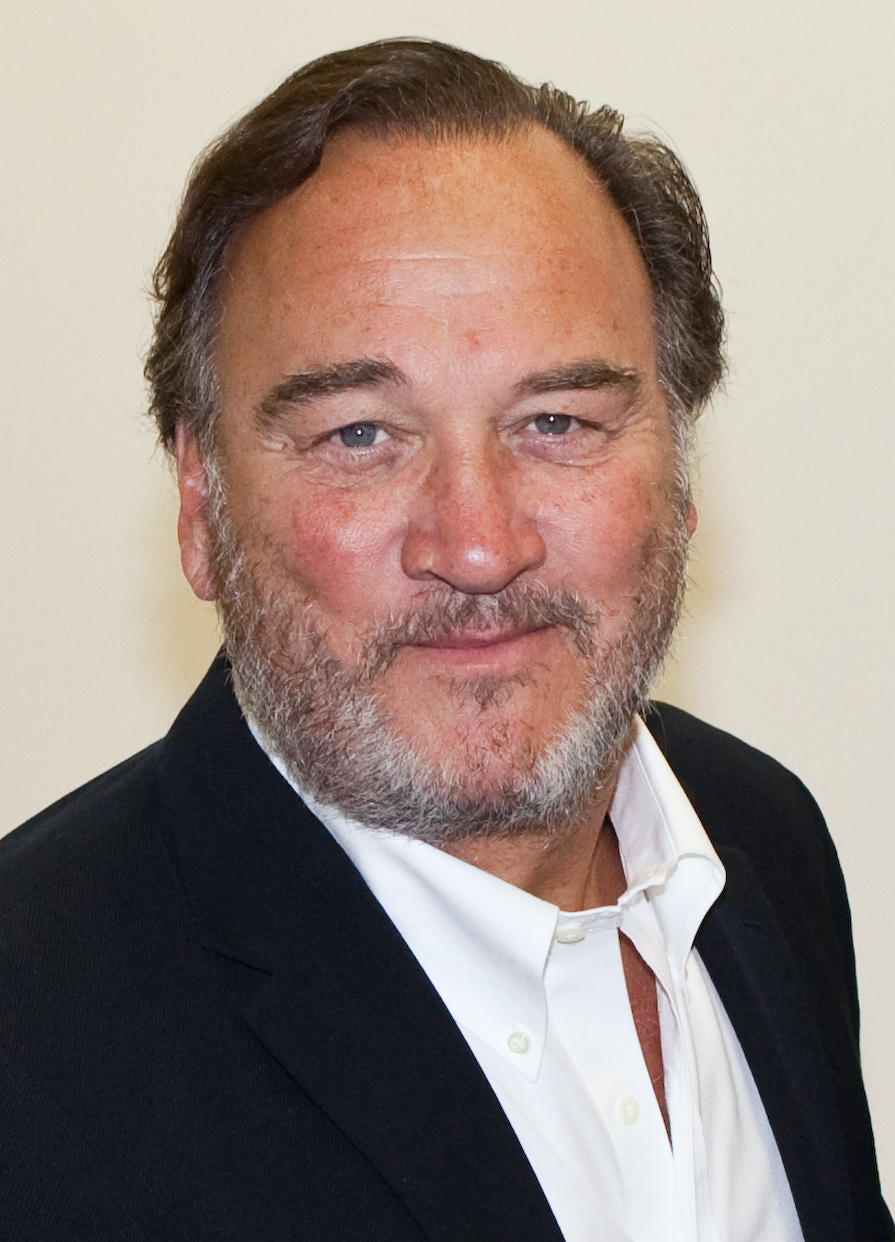
Jim Belushi

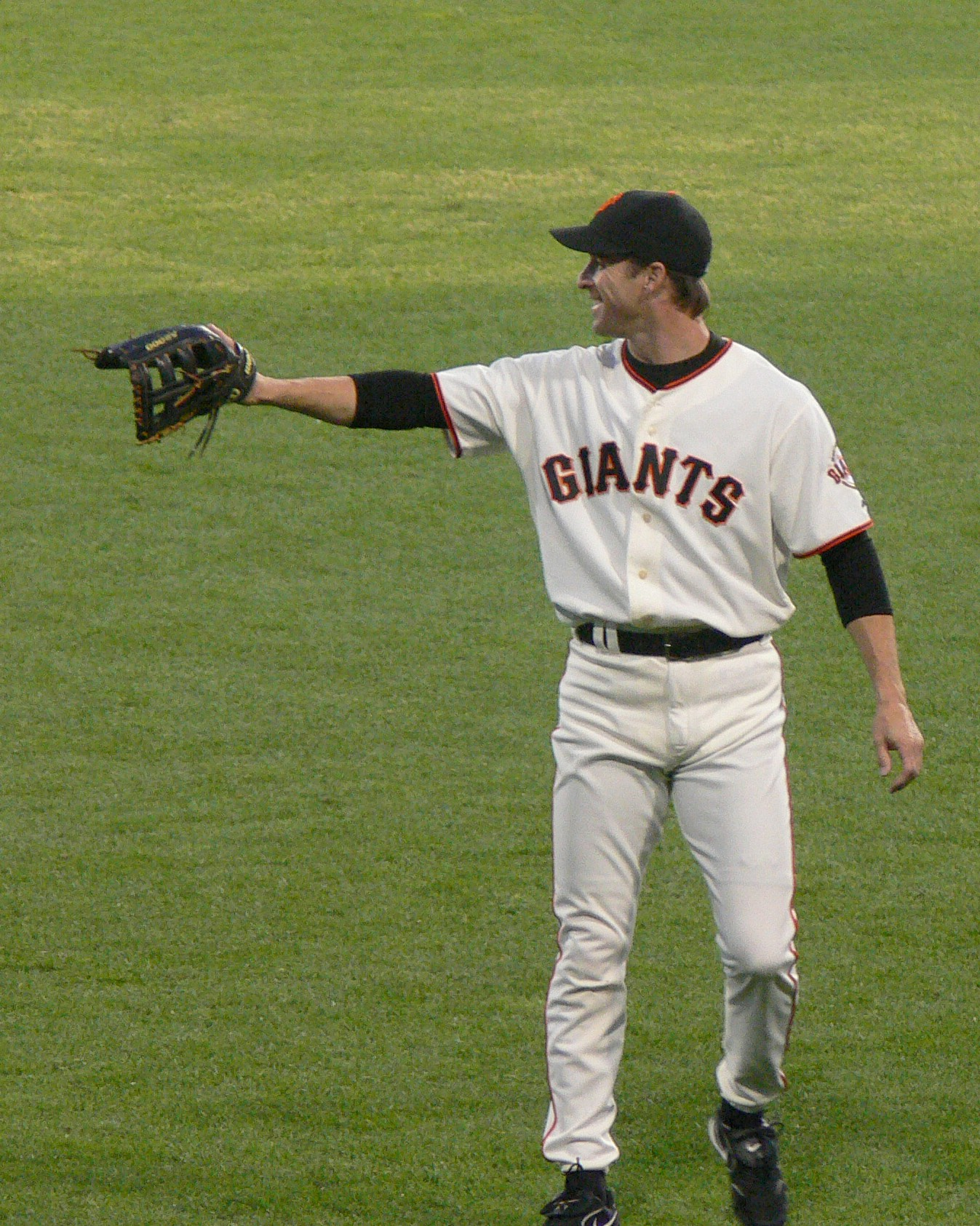
Steve Finley

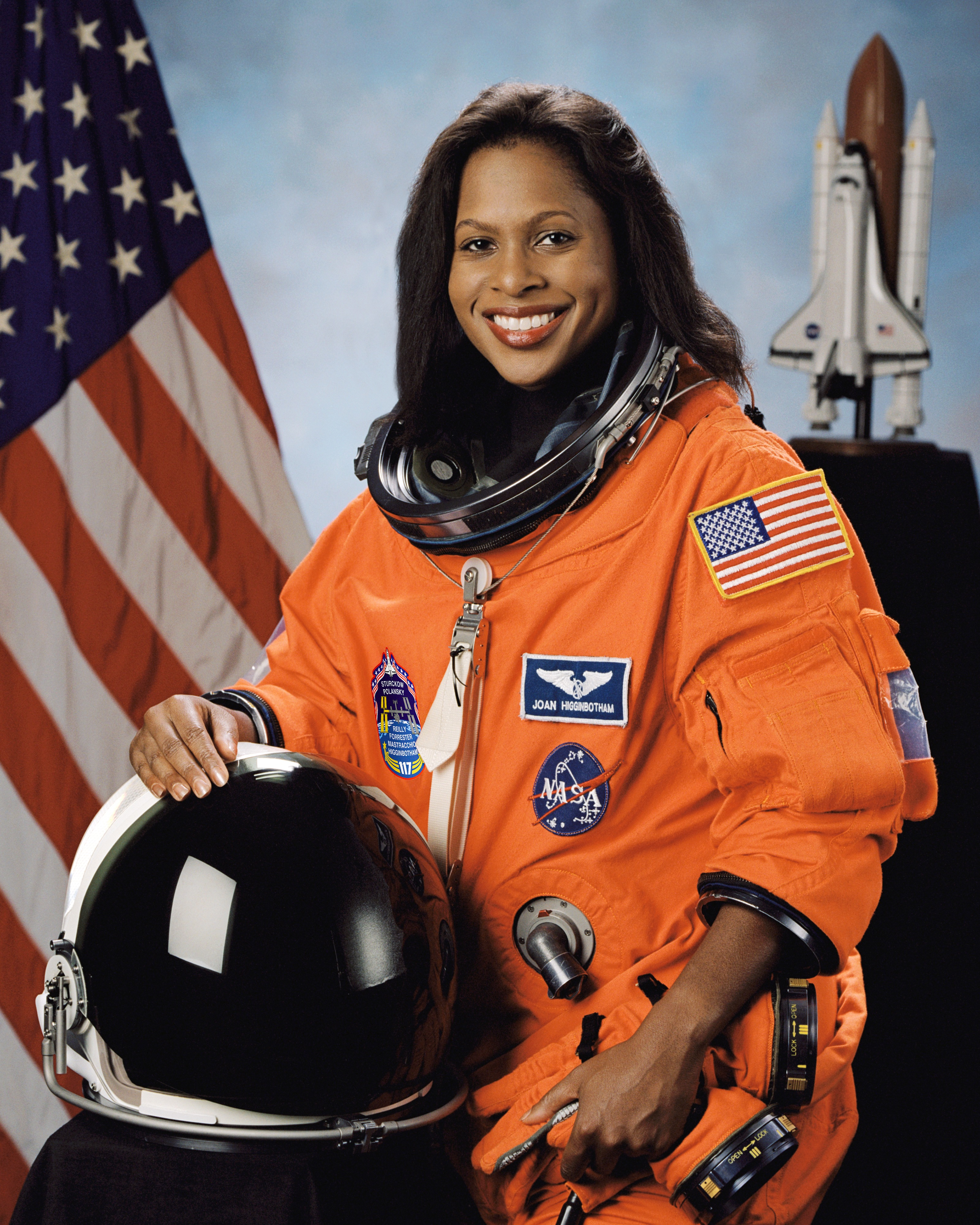
Joan Higgenbotham

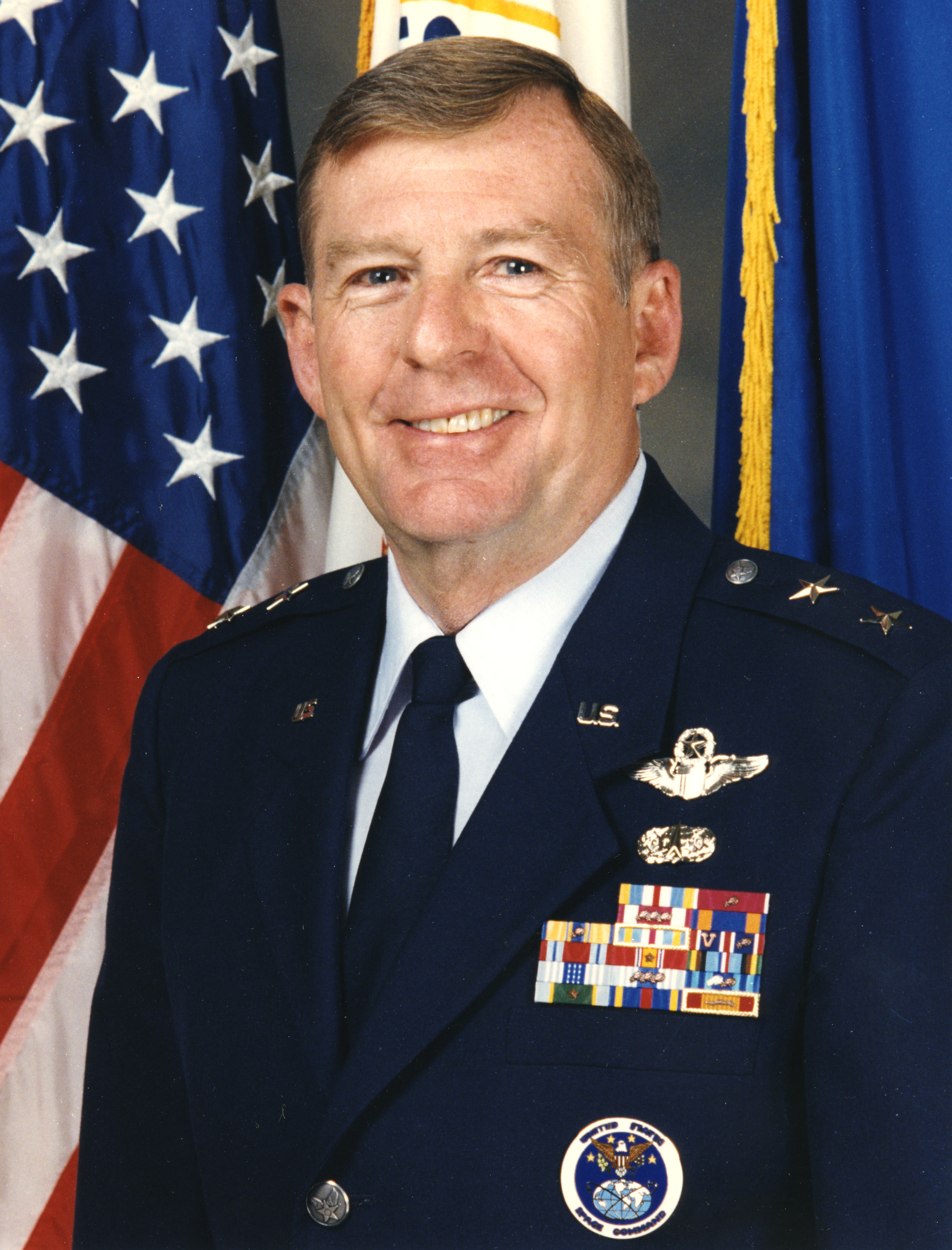
Rodney P. Kelly

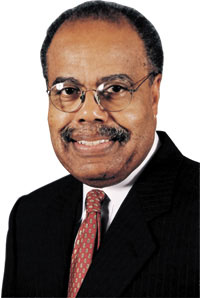
Donald McHenry

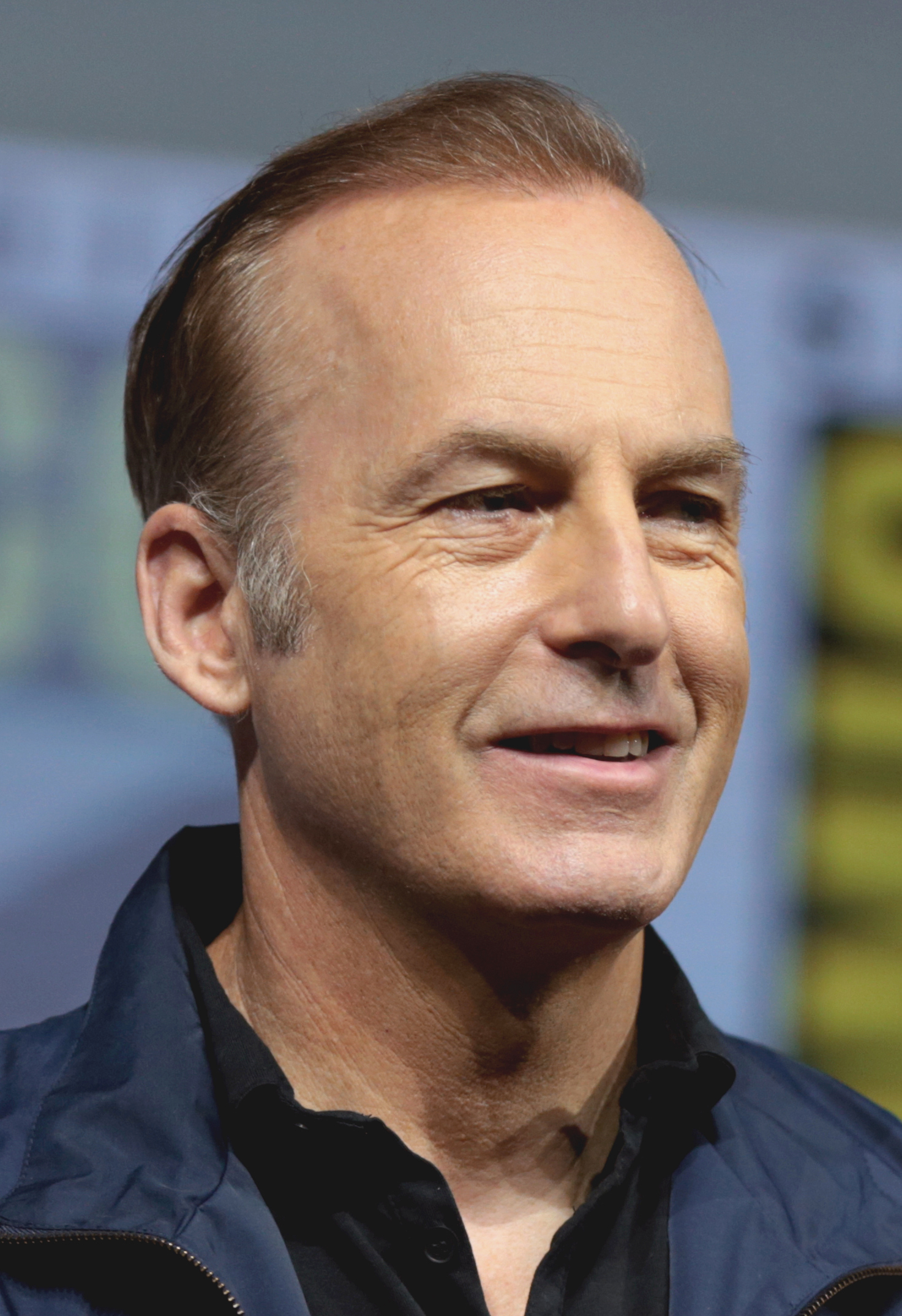
Bob Odenkirk

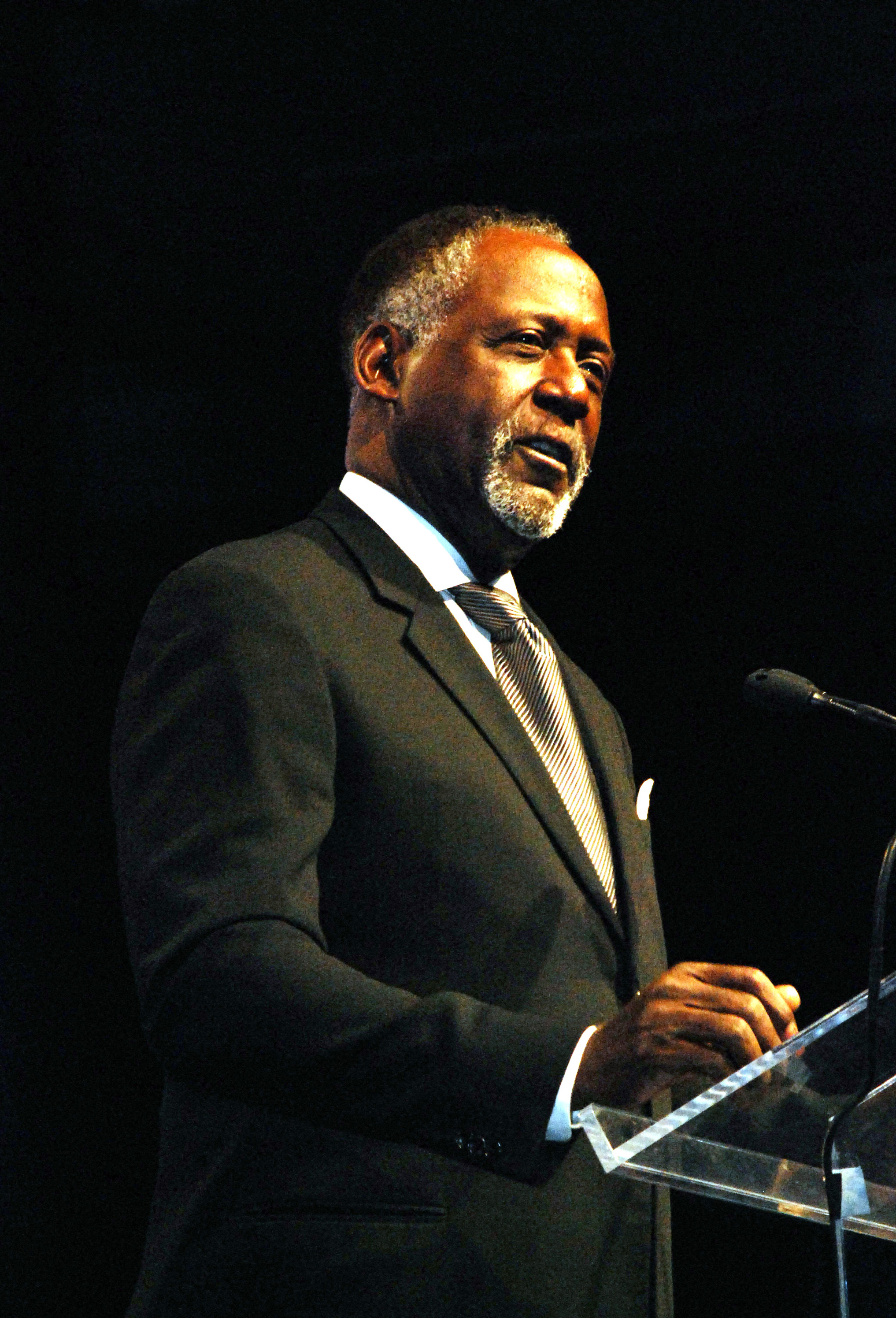
Richard Roundtree

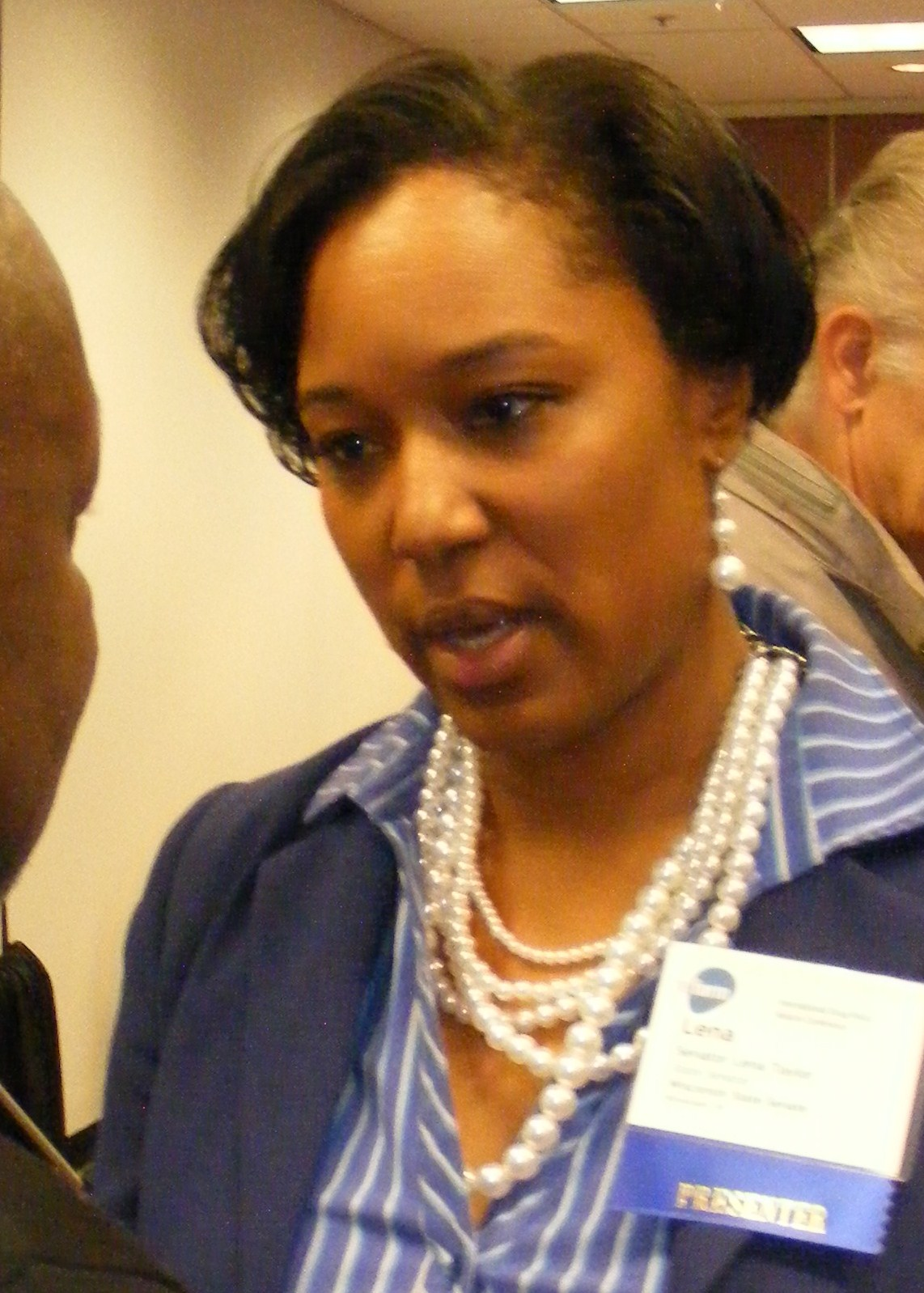
Lena Taylor

- Lionel Antoine – professional football player
- Houston Antwine – professional football player
- Charles Basch – professor of health education at Teachers College, Columbia University
- Jim Belushi – actor and comedian, star of According to Jim, Saturday Night Live, and other films
- Jim Bittermann – CNN European correspondent based in Paris
- Frederick J. Brown – artist
- Amos Bullocks – professional football player
- Hannibal Buress – stand-up comedian, actor, writer, and producer
- Chris Carr – professional basketball player
- Jeremy Chinn – professional football player
- Kim Chizevsky-Nicholls – IFBB pro bodybuilder
- Bill Christine – sportswriter, author, and thoroughbred horse racing executive
- Sam Coonrod – professional baseball player
- Randy Daniels – former Secretary of State of New York
- Don S. Davis – actor and theater professor best known for his role as "General Hammond" on the TV series Stargate SG-1
- Open Mike Eagle – hip hop artist and comedian
- Lee England Jr. – musician and concert violinist
- Steve Finley – professional baseball player
- Stephen Franklin – professional football player
- Dennis Franz – actor best known for his work on NYPD Blue
- Walt Frazier – professional basketball player
- Julio M. Fuentes – Circuit Judge of the United States Court of Appeals for the Third Circuit
- Roberta Griffith, American contemporary artist
- Jerry Hairston Jr. – professional baseball player
- Jim Hart – professional football player
- Joan Higginbotham – engineer and NASA astronaut
- Kevin House – professional football player
- Mary Lee Hu – artist and goldsmith
- Troy Hudson – professional basketball player
- Muhammad Ijaz-ul-Haq – Pakistani politician and son of former President General Zia-ul-Haq
- Brandon Jacobs – professional football player
- Steve James – two-time Oscar nominated film producer
- Darryl Jones – bassist of The Rolling Stones
- Yonel Jourdain – professional football player
- Deji Karim – professional football player
- Rodney P. Kelly – retired United States Air Force Major General
- Timothy Krajcir – serial killer
- Tony Laubach – meteorologist and storm chaser featured on Discovery Channel's Storm Chasers as a researcher with TWISTEX
- Al Levine – professional baseball player
- Milcho Manchevski – filmmaker of Macedonia's first Oscar-nominated film
- Adrian Matejka – poet, finalist for the Pulitzer Prize, and recipient of the National Book Award in poetry
- Carl Mauck – professional football player
- Jenny McCarthy – actress, model, and television host
- Melissa McCarthy – actress, comedian, writer, and producer
- Donald McHenry – United States ambassador to the United Nations (1979–1981)
- Travis Morgan – former USA power lifter
- Brett James McMullen – retired United States Air Force Brigadier General
- Albert E. Mead – former Governor of Washington
- Bryan Mullins – college basketball coach
- Gary Noffke – artist and silversmith
- Bob Odenkirk – actor and comedian best known for his role as Saul Goodman/Jimmy McGill on AMC's series Breaking Bad and Better Call Saul
- Glenn Poshard – Illinois State Senator and United States Congressman
- Sir Curtis Price, KBE – President of the Royal Academy of Music and former president of the Royal Musical Association
- James F. Rea – Illinois State Representative and Senator
- Jason Ringenberg – founding member of Jason & the Scorchers
- Richard Roundtree – actor best known for his work in the 1971 film Shaft
- Marion Rushing – professional football player
- John F. "Jack" Sandner – attorney, commodities trader, and former chairman of the Chicago Mercantile Exchange
- Randy Savage – professional wrestler
- Bart Scott – professional football player
- Jared Yates Sexton – author, political commentator, and creative writing professor
- Derek Shelton – professional baseball player
- Sam Silas – professional football player
- Chad Simpson – Micro Award-winning short and flash fiction author
- Marilyn Skoglund – Associate Justice of the Vermont Supreme Court
- Russ Smith – professional football player
- Jackie Spinner – author, journalist, and war-time correspondent
- Dave Stieb – professional baseball player
- Joe Swanberg – independent filmmaker with notable filmography in the mumblecore sub-genre
- Lena Taylor – Wisconsin Democratic State Senator and member of the Wisconsin 14
- Terry Taylor – professional football player
- Mallica Vajrathon – United Nations senior staff member
- Chico Vaughn – professional basketball player
- George Vukovich – professional baseball player
- Robert K. Weiss – producer of The Blues Brothers and other films
- Ernie Wheelwright – professional football player
- Adrian White – professional football player
- Walt Willey – actor best known for his work on All My Children
- David Wong – author and online personality

== Notable faculty ==
- Robert Corruccini – Distinguished Professor and 1994 Outstanding Scholar; taught from 1978 to 2011 in the College of Liberal Arts, Department of Anthropology; known for his expertise in dental anthropology and epidemiology, formulating a theory of malocclusion
- David F. Duncan – professor of health education and 1984 Teacher of the Year; taught from 1978 to 1989; established the Ph.D. program in community health and the masters in health care administration; later served as a policy advisor in the Clinton White House
- Buckminster Fuller – taught at SIUC 1959–1970; began as an assistant professor in the School of Art and Design and gained full professorship in 1968; known for his geodesic dome design
- Robert S. Gold – professor of health education; pioneer of computer programs for health education and public health; executive vice president of Macro International; founding dean of the University of Maryland School of Public Health
- Lori Stewart Gonzalez – assistant professor; 23rd president of Ohio University
- Michael D. Higgins – visiting Professor; Politician, Sociologist and President of Ireland
- L. Brent Kington – art educator and artist who worked in blacksmithing and sculpture; widely regarded as responsible for the blacksmithing revival in the 1970s
- Harris Deller - is an American ceramist. He is well known for his black and white incised porcelain. He spent most of his career teaching at Southern Illinois University and has work on display in the Museum of Contemporary Art and Design in New York, as well as other collections.
- William M. Lewis Sr. – director of the Cooperative Fisheries Research Unit 1950–1983 (now called the Fisheries and Illinois Aquaculture Center); chair of the Department of Zoology; president of the American Fisheries Society; received the American Fisheries Society Award of Excellence in 1995
- Fazley Bary Malik – professor of theoretical nuclear and atomic physics from 1980 to 2014; Max Planck Societies Senior Fellow (1976 - 1977); Fellow of Bangladesh Academy of Sciences (since 2002); John Wheatley Award by American Physical Society in 2007
- Richard Russo – taught in the English department when his first novel was published in 1986; wrote Nobody's Fool and the Pulitzer Prize-winning Empire Falls, both of which were adapted for the screen and starred Paul Newman
- Paul Arthur Schilpp – noted philosopher and educator; instructed general studies courses in philosophy; founding editor of the Library of Living Philosophers
- Alan Schoen – discoverer of the gyroid
- Paul Martin Simon – taught politics, history, and journalism; Illinois state representative, senator, and lieutenant governor; United States representative and senator; director of the SIU Public Policy Institute (now the Paul Simon Public Policy Institute)
- Nicholas Vergette – professor of art and noted potter and sculptor; part of the British sculpting group named the "Piccassettes"

== See also ==
- Alt.news 26:46
- Southern Illinois University Press
- WSIU-TV
- List of monuments and memorials on the SIU-C Campus
