= Morris Library (SIUC) =

Main library at Southern Illinois University Carbondale

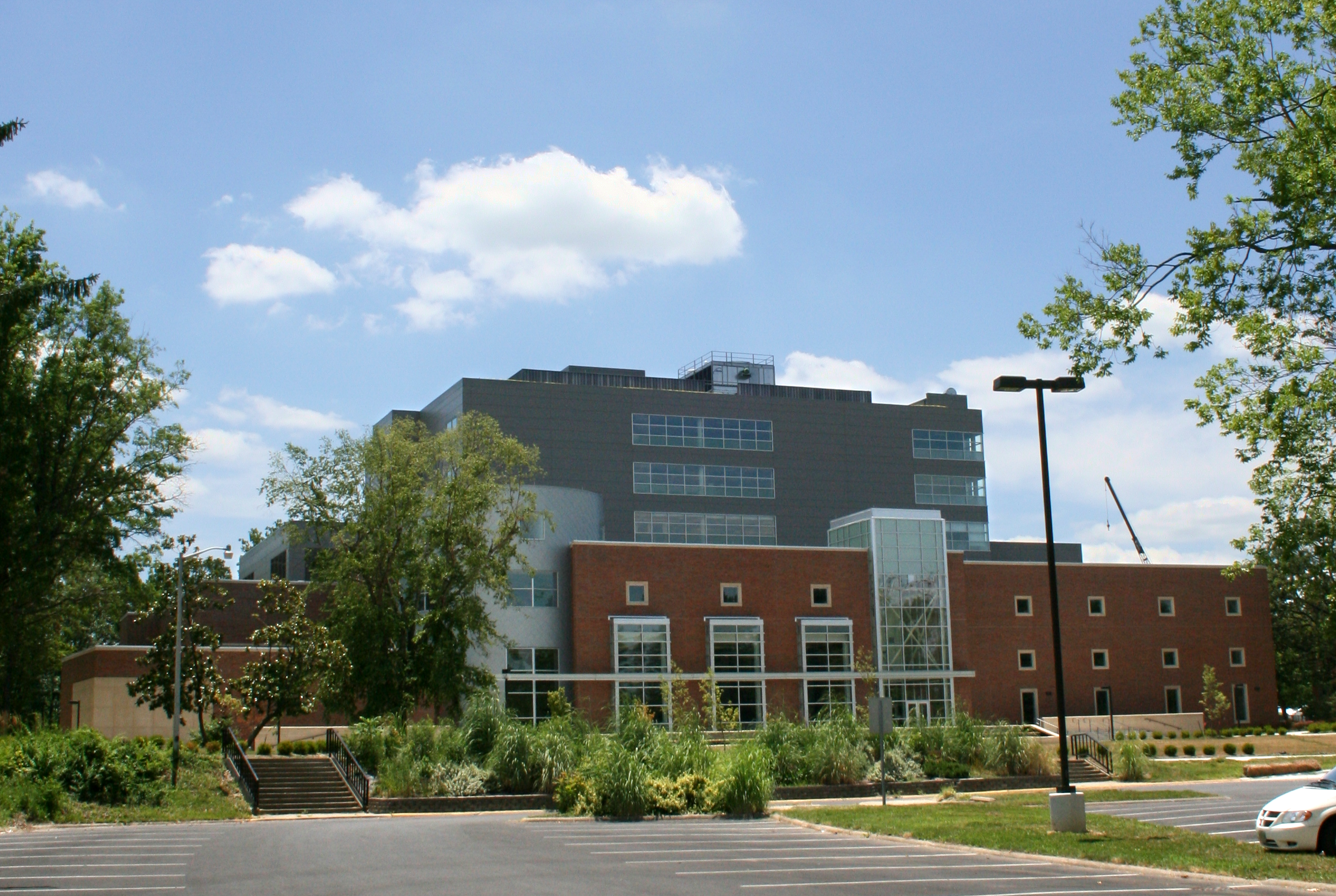
- 37°42′55.1″N 89°13′13.6″W
- Location: Southern Illinois University Carbondale; 605 Agriculture Drive; Carbondale, Illinois 62901
- Type: University Academic Library

Collection
- Items collected: Books, journals, newspapers, magazines, maps, prints and manuscripts, e-books,
- Size: 5 M volumes 300,000 e-books 63,000 current periodicals & serials over 3.6 M microform units

Other information
- Director: Pamela Hackbart-Dean (Special Collections Research Center); Barb Martin (SIU Press); Michael Reiman (Records)
- Website: http://www.lib.siu.edu/ lib.siu.edu

Morris Library is the main academic library on the campus of Southern Illinois University Carbondale, in Carbondale, Illinois. Named for Delyte W. Morris who served as President of Southern Illinois University from 1948 to 1970, the library holds more than 5 million volumes, 63,000 current periodicals and serials, and over 3.6 million microform units. Morris Library also provides access to the statewide automated library system and to an array of electronic sources. These figures make Morris Library among the top 50 largest research libraries in the United States. Library users have access to I-Share (the statewide automated library system) and to a comprehensive array of databases and other electronic data files. As the campus center for access to academic information and collaborative academic technology projects, Morris Library provides a wide range of services, including reference assistance, instructional and technical support, distance learning, geographic information systems (GIS), and multimedia courseware development. Morris Library is a member of the Consortium of Academic and Research Libraries in Illinois (CARLI), Association of Research Libraries (ARL), and the Greater Western Library Alliance (GWLA). Delyte's, a new coffee shop named after former SIU President Delyte W. Morris operates near the entrance of the library. The library occupies 8 floors (including the basement).

The library underwent a $48 million renovation beginning in January 2006, and final completion in 2014.

== Memberships and associations ==
- Association of Research Libraries (ARL)
- Coalition for Networked Information (CNI)
- Consortium of Academic and Research Libraries in Illinois (CARLI)
- Council of Directors of State University Libraries of Illinois (CODSULI)
- Council on Library and Information Resources (CLIR)
- Greater Western Library Alliance (GWLA)
- Online Computer Library Center (OCLC)
- Scholarly Publishing and Academic Resources Coalition (SPARC)
