= Greater Western Library Alliance =

Library collaborative organization

Greater Western Library Alliance (GWLA)
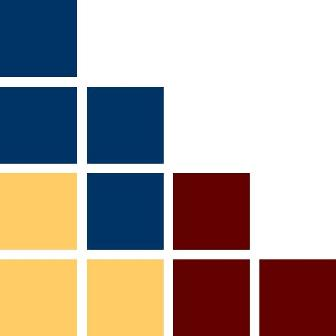
- Type: Nonprofit membership cooperative
- Industry: Library services
- Founded: 1999
- Headquarters: Gravois Mills, MO, United States
- Key people: Joni Blake, Executive Director
- Revenue: 491,935 United States dollar (2022)
- Total assets: 4,635,575 United States dollar (2022)
- Members: 41
- Number of employees: 4
- Website: gwla.org

The Greater Western Library Alliance (GWLA) is a library consortium of 41 research libraries located across the United States.

== Current members ==
- Arizona State University
- Baylor University
- Brigham Young University
- The Claremont Colleges
- Colorado State University
- Iowa State University
- Kansas State University
- Oklahoma State University
- Oregon State University
- Rice University
- Southern Illinois University, Carbondale
- Southern Methodist University
- Texas A&M University
- Texas State University
- Texas Tech University
- University of Alabama
- University of Arizona
- University of Arkansas
- University of Colorado
- University of Delaware
- University of Denver
- University of Hawaiʻi at Mānoa
- University of Houston
- University of Illinois, Chicago
- University of Kansas
- University of Missouri
- University of Nevada, Las Vegas
- University of Nevada, Reno
- University of New Mexico
- University of Oklahoma
- University of South Carolina
- University of Southern California
- University of Texas
- University of Utah
- University of Washington
- University of Wyoming
- Utah State University
- Washington State University
- Washington University in St. Louis
- Wayne State University
- West Virginia University

== Former Members ==
- Linda Hall Library
- University of Nebraska–Lincoln
- University of Oregon

== Projects and Associated Organizations ==
- Occam's Reader. In February 2014, it was announced that GWLA, along with development partners Texas Tech University and University of Hawaiʻi at Mānoa, had entered into an agreement with Springer Science+Business to do a year-long pilot test of the eBook interlibrary loan software Occam's Reader.
- Western Waters Digital Library. In 2004, the Western Waters Digital Library was begun as a collaborative regional project by twelve research libraries under the auspices of the Greater Western Library Alliance (GWLA). Since its inception, an additional 18 institutions have joined the project.
- BioOne. The Greater Western Library Alliance was one of five collaborating institutions which founded BioOne, a not-for-profit collaborative created to address inequities in STM publishing. BioOne was founded in 2001.

== Media outlets and social networking ==
In addition to the official website, GWLA has a presence on Facebook. An occasional newsletter is also issued, and an archive is available.
