= Bay Creek Wilderness =

Wilderness area in Illinois, US

Coordinates: 37°33′09″N 88°37′21″W

The Bay Creek Wilderness is a 2,866-acre (11.60 km^{2}) parcel of land listed as a Wilderness Area of the United States. It is located within the Shawnee National Forest in Pope County, Illinois. The nearest town of any size is Eddyville.

== Second-growth wilderness ==
As with other wilderness areas within Shawnee National Forest, the Bay Creek Wilderness is made of second-growth forested areas that were used, until the land acquisitions of the 1930s, as agriculture land.

Shawnee National Forest was created in 1939, and in 1990, the Illinois Wilderness Act set aside seven separate parcels of land within this National Forest as relatively small wilderness areas. The Bay Creek Wilderness, one of these parcels, is a roadless parcel of land within the national forest.

Today, the United States Forest Service manages much of the wilderness; after attempting to re-establish conifers on the land parcel, the agency largely left it alone, and spinneys and groves of hardwoods reestablished themselves.

== Bay Creek ==
Flowing through and draining most of the Bay Creek Wilderness is the upper reaches, close to the headwaters, of Bay Creek, the watercourse for which the wilderness is named. Bay Creek, a tributary of the Ohio River, is currently under study for potential listing as a Wild and Scenic River.

== Adjacent protected areas ==
On its northwestern edge, the Bay Creek Wilderness adjoins the Burden Falls Wilderness, another Wilderness Area within Shawnee National Forest. The Burden Falls waterfall is made up of water flowing out of the Bay Creek Wilderness.

On the southwestern edge of the Bay Creek Wilderness, Bay Creek itself flows through the ghost town of Watkins Ford, Illinois into Bell Smith Springs, a National Natural Landmark.
