= Lusk Creek Canyon =

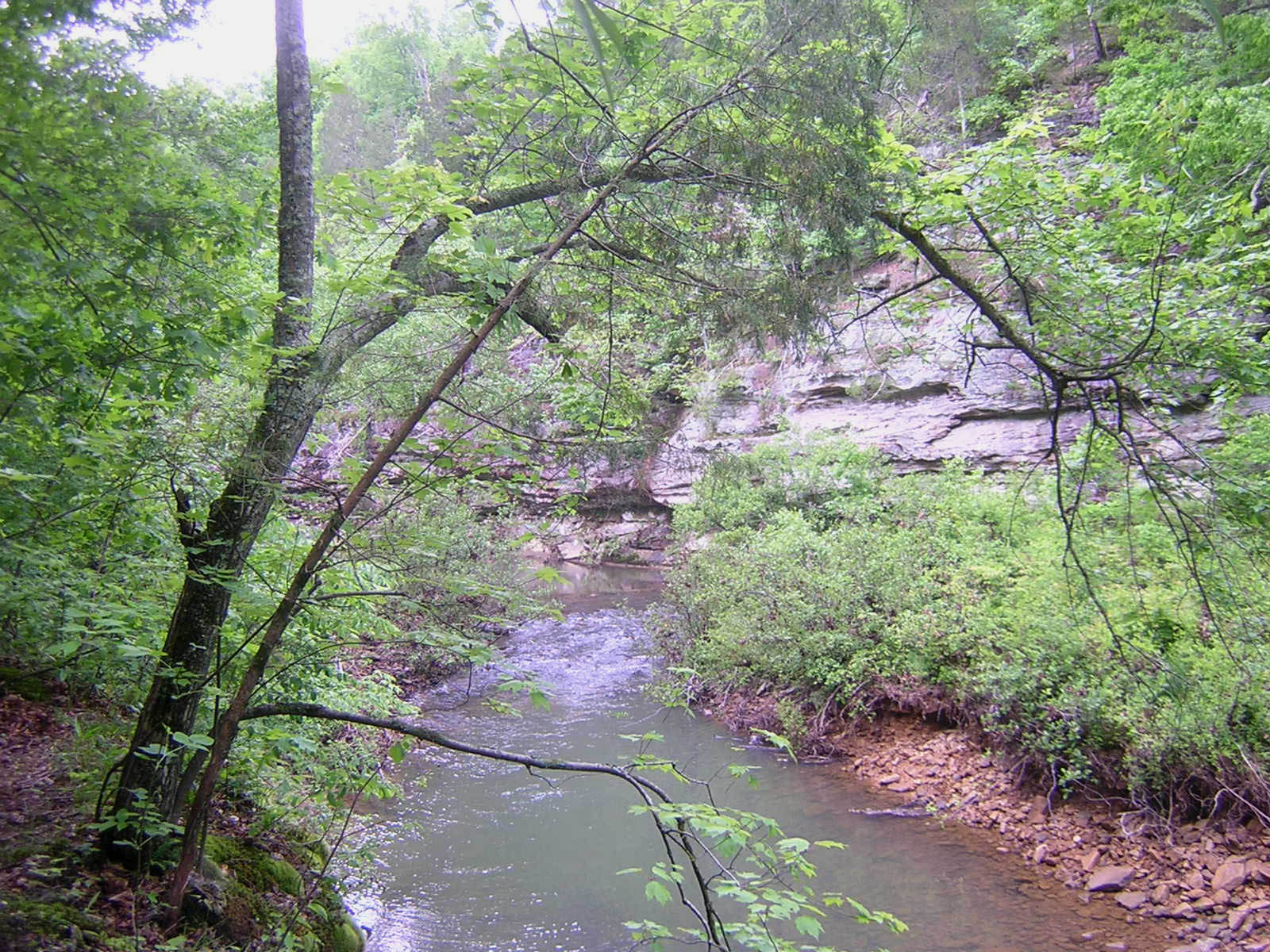
- Lusk Creek Canyon

- Location within Illinois
- Location: Pope County, Illinois
- Nearest city: Eddyville
- Coordinates: 37°31′08″N 88°32′24″W
- Area: 906 acres (367 ha)
- Designated: 1980

Lusk Creek Canyon is the name of a 906 acres (367 ha) canyon located within the Lusk Creek Wilderness Area of the Shawnee National Forest in Pope County, Illinois. The area is a large gorge formed by the erosion of Pennsylvanian sandstone around a large horseshoe bend in the creek. It contains plants such as fan leafed clubmoss, cinnamon fern, royal fern as well as ten endangered or threatened plant species. It was designated a National Natural Landmark in 1980.
