= Lusk Creek Wilderness =

Wilderness area in Illinois, United States

- IUCN category Ib (wilderness area)
- Location within the United States
- Location: Pope County, Illinois, USA
- Nearest city: Eddyville, Illinois
- Coordinates: 37°31′43″N 88°31′42″W
- Area: 6,293 acres (2,547 ha)
- Established: 1990
- Governing body: U.S. Forest Service

The Lusk Creek Wilderness is a 6,293-acre (25.47 km^{2}) parcel of land listed as a Wilderness Area of the United States. It is located within the Shawnee National Forest in Pope County, Illinois. The nearest town of any size is Eddyville, Illinois. It includes the Lusk Creek Canyon National Natural Landmark.

== Geology, ecology, and history ==
Like the nearby Garden of the Gods Wilderness, the Lusk Creek Wilderness contains dramatic cliffs and overlooks eroded from Carboniferous gray sandstone. As with other wilderness areas within Shawnee National Forest, the Lusk Creek Wilderness is made of hilly second-growth forested areas that were used, until the land condemnations of the 1930s, as pasture land. After the condemnations, many of the cleared areas within the forested hills reverted to forest. The largest trees in the Lust Creek Wilderness terraces are sugar maples and beeches, while on the slopes the hickory and white oak can be seen. The wilderness is also noted for a dramatic scenic overlook, Indian Kitchen. The top of the bluff remains on private property, and the public is not allowed.

Shawnee National Forest was created in 1939, and in 1990, the Illinois Wilderness Act set aside seven separate parcels of land within this National Forest as relatively small wilderness areas. The Lusk Creek Wilderness, one of these parcels, is a roadless parcel of land within the national forest. It is the largest wilderness area in Illinois.

Lusk Creek Wilderness is served by the River to River Trail.
