= Bell Smith Springs Recreation Area =

Protected area in Pope County, Illinois

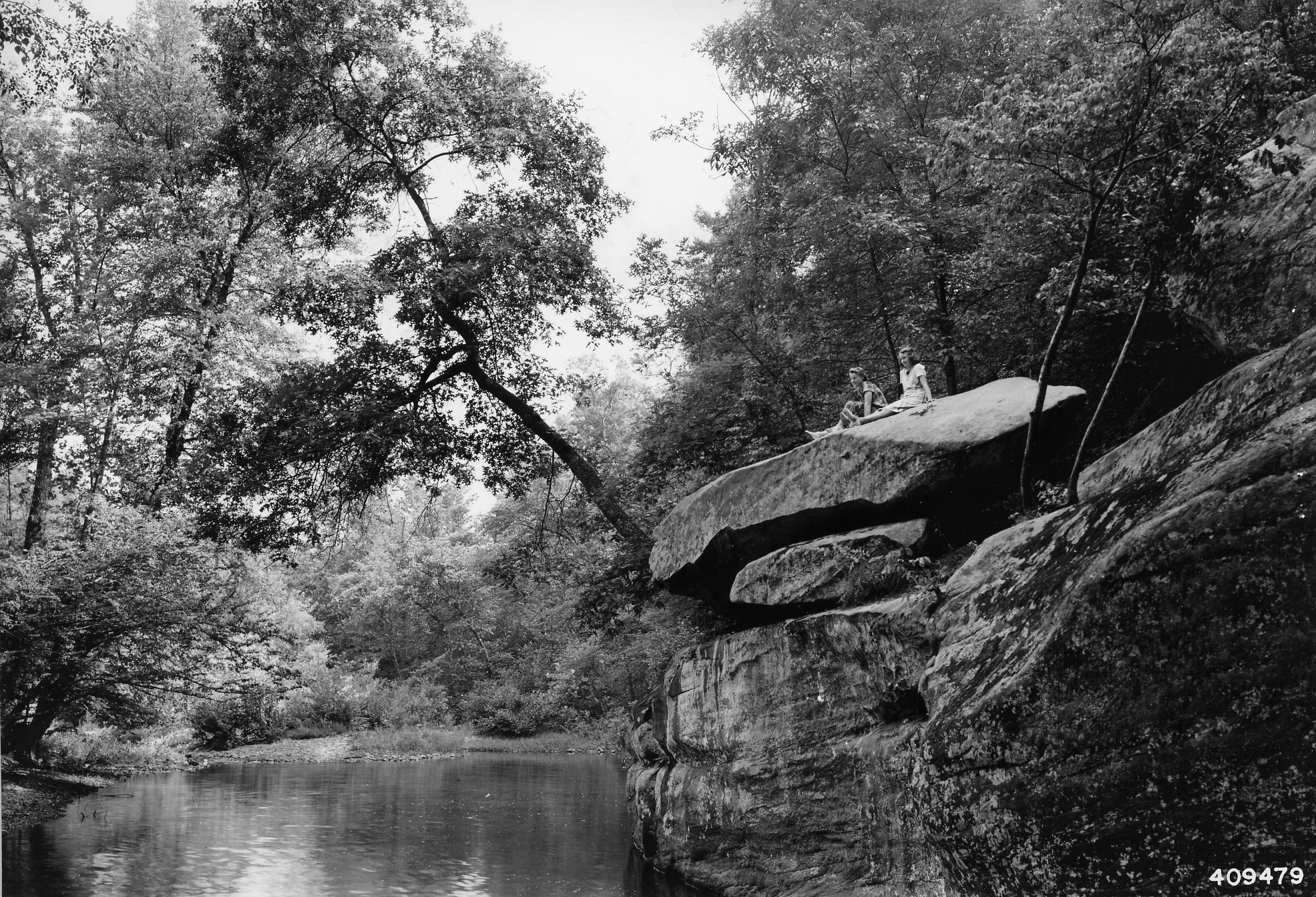
- Photograph of scene at Bell Smith Springs, June 1941

- Location within Illinois
- Location: Pope County, Illinois
- Nearest city: Eddyville
- Coordinates: 37°31′7″N 88°39′22″W

U.S. National Natural Landmark
- Designated: 1980

Bell Smith Springs Recreation Area is a National Natural Landmark designated in 1980 and located in Shawnee National Forest within Pope County, on Country Road 350E (also designated as Forest Road 848 on some maps), near Eddyville.

== Description ==
Sandstone cliffs at Bell Smith Springs, cut by tributaries of Bay Creek in the Caseyville Formation, photographed in 2026.

Parking is free at two locations within the park; however, the nearby Redbud Campground has an entrance fee.

Bell Smith Springs is a natural recreational area consisting of 8 miles (13 km) of marked trails over varied terrain surrounded by sandstone cliffs, and crisscrossed by four creeks. A map and overview of the features of the park is prominently displayed at the first parking turnout and trailhead. Each trail is marked with its own unique color, usually on trees alongside the trail. The trails can be moderately strenuous; the shallow creeks occasionally wash out parts of the trail and may require wading to cross. In wet weather, parts of the trail can be hazardous due to slippery rock.

A popular spot for visitors is the natural stone arch, the largest in Shawnee National Forest with a span of 125 feet (38 m), which can be found along the Natural Bridge Trail. Hikers wishing to see the arch from the top may climb metal bars embedded in the rock; or alternatively there is a longer walking route that winds around to the top.

Due to the abundance of water, vegetation within the park is lush. During the summer months, some of the deeper pools along the creeks are frequented by swimmers.

Wildlife includes bobcats, deer, and foxes, as well as turkeys and many other types of birds. Hunting and fishing are allowed in season with a license.
