= 1000-lb Sisters =

American reality television series

- Also known as: Family by the Ton
- Genre: Reality television
- Starring: Amy Slaton; Tammy Slaton; Chris Combs; Brittany Combs
- Country of origin: United States
- Original language: English
- No. of seasons: 9
- No. of episodes: 75

Production
- Executive producers: Tom Cappello; Alana Goldstein; John Hein; Keely Walker Muse; Lissette Decos; Vasoula Plakas
- Cinematography: Charlene Fisk
- Production company: Crazy Legs Productions

Original release
- Network: TLC
- Release: January 1, 2020 – present

1000-lb Sisters is an American reality television series that first aired on TLC in 2020. The show focuses on the personal lives of the Slaton family in Dixon, Kentucky, primarily sisters Amy Slaton-Lovvorn and Tammy Slaton. The show chronicles the sister's daily lives along with their attempts at weight loss and bariatric surgery.

Over the course of the series, the show has expanded to document the weight-loss journeys and personal progress of other Slaton family members, including their siblings Chris Combs, Amanda Halterman, and Misty Wentworth. It has gained a significant following on TLC and social media, earning attention for its portrayal of severe obesity, mental health issues, family dynamics, and major life changes, including surgeries, marriages, and divorces.

== Cast ==
=== Main ===
- Amy Slaton-Lovvorn
- Tammy Slaton
- Chris Combs (recurring season 2; main season 3–present), Amy's and Tammy's older brother
- Brittany Combs (recurring season 2; main season 3–present), Chris' wife
- Misty Wentworth (season 2; main season 3–present), Amy's and Tammy's oldest sister

=== Recurring ===
- Darlene Slaton (recurring guest season 1–present) Amy, Tammy, Chris, Misty, and Amanda's mother
- Michael Halterman (seasons 1–5), Amy's former husband and father to her two kids
- Angela Halterman (season 1), Michael's sister
- Amanda Halterman (season 3–present), Amy's and Tammy's older sister
- Caleb Willingham (seasons 4–5) Tammy's late husband who died at the end of season 5
- Brian Lovvorn (season 7–present), Amy's new husband
- Andrea Dalton (season 7–present), Tammy's girlfriend (and current fiancée)
- Ollisha "Lee Lee" Davis (season 8) Amy's friend

== Episodes ==
=== Series overview ===
Season	Episodes	Originally released	
Season	Episodes	First released	Last released
1	6	January 1, 2020	February 5, 2020
2	10	January 4, 2021	March 8, 2021
3	12	November 15, 2021	January 31, 2022
4	10	January 17, 2023	March 21, 2023
5	9	December 12, 2023	February 6, 2024
6	10	October 8, 2024	December 17, 2024
7	8	April 15, 2025	June 10, 2025
8	10	January 6, 2026	March 10, 2026
9	11	September 1, 2026	November 10, 2026

=== Season 1 (2020) ===
No. overall	No. in season	Title	Original release date	Prod. code	U.S. viewers (millions)
1	1	"Meet the Slaton Sisters"	January 1, 2020	101	0.96
In the small town of Dixon, Kentucky, sisters Amy and Tammy Slaton live together with Amy's husband Michael Halterman. Amy makes dinner for her and Tammy which includes many unhealthy foods. Amy reveals she has many conditions due to her weight including diabetes. Tammy also reveals that she has many medical conditions, she has been to the hospital numerous times and has been on life support twice. The sisters have lunch with their mother Darlene to tell her their decision to get surgery for weight loss much to her discouragement.
2	2	"1,000 Pounds to Freedom"	January 8, 2020	102	0.89
Amy and Tammy take an eight hour car ride to meet a bariatric surgeon and host a meet-and-greet.
3	3	"Breaking Point"	January 15, 2020	103	0.91
Amy and Tammy return from their trip to Atlanta. The sisters decide to throw away their junk food, however they soon struggle with cravings.
4	4	"A House Divided"	January 22, 2020	104	1.20
Amy has a date night with her husband, Michael, after a fight with Tammy.
5	5	"Weddings and Weigh-ins"	January 29, 2020	105	1.11
Amy hosts her dream wedding before her surgery, as she is afraid she may die on the operating table.
6	6	"Under the Knife"	February 5, 2020	106	1.19
Tammy has her final weigh-in with Dr. Procter. Amy prepares for bariatric surgery.

=== Season 2 (2021) ===
No. overall	No. in season	Title	Original release date	Prod. code	U.S. viewers (millions)
7	1	"Life-Altering News"	January 4, 2021	201	1.26
After surgery, Amy receives life-changing news at urgent care. The sisters’ family stage an intervention with Tammy over her health.
8	2	"Tippin' the Scales"	January 11, 2021	202	1.05
The sisters travel to see Dr. Procter in Atlanta. Amy is afraid to reveal her pregnancy, as Dr. Procter advised against getting pregnant so soon after surgery. Tammy discovers she has gained all her weight back.
9	3	"Wake-Up Call"	January 18, 2021	203	1.10
The sisters head to therapy, where they blame each other for their problems. Tammy gets devastating news. The sister's brother, Chris, decides to work towards getting bariatric surgery. Amy struggles with overeating during her pregnancy.
10	4	"A Fork in the Road"	January 25, 2021	204	1.00
The family find out why Amy went to the emergency room. Chris and Tammy visit a new doctor. Tammy must step on the scale after ignoring her diet for a month.
11	5	"Dropping Bombs"	February 1, 2021	205	0.97
Tammy's doctor gives her a challenging weight goal. Amy and Michael drop a bomb.
12	6	"There's Something About Jerry"	February 8, 2021	206	0.98
The sisters celebrate their favorite holiday, Halloween, while Tammy's boyfriend, Jerry, comes to visit. Tammy's sister Misty is suspicious of Jerry's intentions with Tammy.
13	7	"Jerry Bites Back"	February 15, 2021	207	1.03
The family are concerned that Jerry is derailing Tammy's diet. Tammy reveals her big secret to Jerry. Amy has a maternity photo shoot.
14	8	"Everybody Hurts"	February 22, 2021	208	0.96
The sisters visit a psychic and receive disturbing news. Tammy's family will do anything to help her reach her weight loss goals. Amy is rushed to the ER and must face her fears.
15	9	"Labor of Love"	March 1, 2021	209	0.98
Amy's high-risk pregnancy has complications. Chris and Tammy are cautiously optimistic about Tammy's weight loss, until she steps on the scale.
16	10	"Do or Die"	March 8, 2021	210	1.17
Tammy is recovering from COVID-19 and needs constant oxygen; her weight spirals. Chris has his final weigh-in. Amy makes a big decision about her future. Tammy's romance gets serious and her family intervene.

=== Season 3 (2021–2022) ===
No. overall	No. in season	Title	Original release date	Prod. code	U.S. viewers (millions)
17	1	"Welcome to Rehab"	November 15, 2021	301	1.27
Tammy makes a life-altering decision as she continues to gain weight. Amy gets a taste of her dream life. Chris experiences repercussions from emergency surgery.
18	2	"Goodbye Freedom"	November 22, 2021	302	1.20
Tammy returns from rehab and Amy kisses her freedom goodbye as she makes a decision regarding Tammy. Chris tries to lose weight after his setback, however he and Tammy are shocked when they step on the scales.
19	3	"Tammy's New Squeeze"	November 29, 2021	303	1.17
Amy is concerned that Tammy's new nurse doesn't push her to lose weight. The family try to figure out why Tammy is slacking. Chris and Tammy fight over Tammy's new boyfriend.
20	4	"Heavy Hoarders"	December 6, 2021	304	1.21
Amy must confront her demons as she attempts to get her house in order. Tammy admits she has been cheating on her diet, right before her first doctor's appointment since returning from rehab. Chris has a weigh-in that could change everything.
21	5	"Pushed Too Far"	December 13, 2021	305	1.30
Chris blames Amy for enabling Tammy. The family worry that Tammy's new boyfriend is enabling her weight gain. Amy has an idea to help Tammy, a meet-and-greet.
22	6	"Man vs. Scale"	December 20, 2021	306	1.25
Tammy sees a new therapist. Amy is ready to lose her excess skin, but the plastic surgeon has bad news. Chris has a final weigh-in, if he is under 400 pounds he will have bariatric surgery.
23	7	"The Moment of Truth"	December 27, 2021	307	1.51
Amy must face the demands of motherhood while losing weight. Tammy returns to rehab for her food addiction. Chris has bariatric surgery without Tammy to support him.
24	8	"A Very Slaton Vacation"	January 3, 2022	308	1.31
Chris makes progress after his surgery. Tammy gets bad news. Amy plans Tammy's 35th birthday. The family plan their first sibling vacation, with concerns about Tammy's mobility.
25	9	"Smoky Mountain Meltdown"	January 10, 2022	309	1.48
The family vacation is off to a bad start when Tammy refuses to enter the cabin. Chris wants to fulfil a lifelong dream, but hopes he has lost enough weight.
26	10	"Moving on Up and Partying on Down"	January 17, 2022	310	1.55
Amy drops a bomb on Tammy after the disastrous family vacation. Tammy makes a decision that will impede her weight-loss progress.
27	11	"End of an Era"	January 24, 2022	311	1.49
Amy and Michael move out of the duplex. Tammy's partying takes a turn for the worse and Amanda tries to make her see the error of her ways. Dr. Procter gives Amy a rude awakening.
28	12	"Never Say Never"	January 31, 2022	312	1.97
Amy visits a pediatric dietitian, who gives her difficult news about her son's diet. Dr. Smith confronts Tammy about her lifestyle. Tammy's health hits a dangerous low.

=== Season 4 (2023) ===
No. overall	No. in season	Title	Original release date	Prod. code	U.S. viewers (millions)
29	1	"The Sweet and Sour Life"	January 17, 2023	401	1.19
Having survived yet another brush with death, Tammy recovers at rehab, but a new scare threatens her life. The family adjusts to life without Tammy, and Amy's big surprise stuns everyone.
30	2	"Can't Have Your Cake and Eat it Too"	January 24, 2023	402	1.07
Tammy's seemingly good progress inspires Amy to visit, reuniting the siblings for the first time in months. Amy learns she's at risk of serious complications if she doesn't get her eating under control.
31	3	"I Don't Want To Taco Bout It"	January 31, 2023	403	1.27
Tammy hits a tipping point at rehab, and then more bad news from back home sends her into a downward spiral. Chris gets a reality check during a check in with Dr. Smith, and the family says goodbye to a beloved family member.
32	4	"Icing on the Cake"	February 7, 2023	404	1.00
After finding out Tammy's been robbed, Misty and Amanda visit to break the news in person. While Chris pushes ahead toward his surgery goal, Amy has a setback and is rushed to the ER.
33	5	"Greatest Thing Since Sliced Bread"	February 14, 2023	405	1.11
Tammy gives Dr. Smith and her family big news. The family worries when Amy's C-section takes much longer than expected.
34	6	"A Lot of Cooks in the Kitchen"	February 21, 2023	406	1.23
Tammy struggles to cope after surviving a near-death experience, and Amy realises being an overweight mom may prove to be too much. Meanwhile, Chris is desperate to get rid of excess skin, while Amanda offloads some dead weight of her own.
35	7	"Proof Is in the Pudding"	February 28, 2023	407	1.24
After years of struggling with weight loss, Tammy finally has her surgery, but things are not as straightforward as expected. Amy meets with Dr. Procter and gets an ambitious weight loss goal.
36	8	"Forbidden Fruit"	March 7, 2023	408	1.31
Tammy wants to come home, but a setback causes a major blowup between her and the family. A new man has entered Tammy's life, but now all bets are off.
37	9	"Walkin' on Eggshells"	March 14, 2023	409	1.24
Tammy announces her engagement to the family and reveals that her big day is only two weeks away. Amy takes up Maid of Honor duties, and the family wonders if there's another reason Tammy is rushing down the aisle.
38	10	"Apple of My Eye"	March 21, 2023	410	1.47
Tammy's wedding day is just around the corner, and Amy struggles to get the venue decorated and keep her emotions in check. A wardrobe malfunction and a case of cold feet threaten to derail the nuptials.

=== Season 5 (2023–2024) ===
No. overall	No. in season	Title	Original release date	Prod. code	U.S. viewers (millions)
39	1	"Bringing Home the Bacon"	December 12, 2023	501	0.86
When Tammy heads home after 14 months in rehab, she's forced to make the most difficult decision of her life. Amy is fed up with not having help and feels her marriage is starting to unravel. Amanda and Misty reveal they're getting bariatric surgery.
40	2	"Fork You! I'm Done!"	December 19, 2023	502	1.01
Tammy hosts a housewarming and argues with her mom. Amy confronts Michael about not helping raise their sons. Caleb has been dishonest with Tammy.
41	3	"Well-Done and Over With"	December 26, 2023	503	1.01
Amy makes the most difficult decision of her life after her altercation with Michael. Chris and Tammy are overdue for a visit with Dr. Smith. Amanda and Misty perform a last-minute detox to sweat out nicotine before surgery.
42	4	"The Grapes of Wrath"	January 2, 2024	504	1.10
Amanda and Misty get big news and take a major step in their health journey. Amy and Tammy blow off some steam. Amy gets some devastating news from her lawyer that sends her reeling.
43	5	"The Custard-y Battle"	January 9, 2024	505	1.19
Tammy goes to rehab on a recon mission after learning something about Caleb. Chris finds an unusual way to improve his diet. Amy and Michael have their first divorce hearing in court.
44	6	"Fried, Cried and Tried"	January 16, 2024	506	1.20
Caleb surprises Tammy with a romantic dinner date, but the date goes south when Tammy discovers the menu. The Slatons attend a Zumba class, but Amy's lack of self-care causes a meltdown.
45	7	"Dill With It"	January 23, 2024	507	1.29
The family preps for their very first beach vacation, and Tammy hits some major milestones. While everyone flies, Amy opts for a nine-hour car ride which leaves her and the boys cranky. Then, Chris gives Amy some tough love.
46	8	"Boiling Point"	January 30, 2024	508	1.29
Tammy is having a hard time coping following a near-death experience. Amy realizes the struggle of being an overweight mom. Chris wants to get rid of his excess skin and Amanda offloads some dead weight.
47	9	"Sunflower"	February 6, 2024	509	1.35
Amy is ashamed of her behavior in Florida and wants to make amends, but worries Amanda won't accept her apology. When Tammy gets some devastating news, her whole world is turned upside down, and her family rallies behind her in support.

=== Season 6 (2024) ===
No. overall	No. in season	Title	Original release date	Prod. code	U.S. viewers (millions)
48	1	"Life Is Going to Be Gouda"	October 8, 2024	601	0.65
Tammy takes small steps towards independence, Amy moves home but struggles with ghosts of the past, the sisters get new looks to go with their new attitude, and an upcoming Dr. Smith appointment has everyone on edge.
49	2	"Recipe for Disaster"	October 15, 2024	602	0.78
Dr. Smith holds an all-sibling weigh-in appointment and the moment of truth is a tough pill to swallow for some. With her recent makeover, Amy looks ahead to her new life. Tammy and Amanda's long-running sibling feud reaches new heights.
50	3	"War and Peas"	October 22, 2024	603	0.66
Tammy needs a new place to live but finds more problems than solutions. Amy makes a peace offering with some questionable ingredients.
51	4	"I Candy-cane't"	October 29, 2024	604	0.72
A time for cheer is met with jeer as the entire family remains divided during Christmas, and Amy celebrates her first Christmas as a single mom and decides to try on heels for the first time ever.
52	5	"Carbe Diem"	November 12, 2024	605	0.77
Chris gears up for his upcoming appointment with a plastic surgeon and encourages Tammy to tag along. Amy whips up dinner for the whole family. Dinner gets thrown into chaos when one of the siblings drops some big news.
53	6	"Limo Beans"	November 19, 2024	606	0.81
Tammy has her heart set on skin removal but is met with a roadblock. Amy works on rebuilding her self-esteem. Chris and Misty get closer to their goals, but Amanda falls behind.
54	7	"Turning a New Beef"	November 26, 2024	607	0.76
Tammy and Amy fight over their big night out. Chris and Amy see a genealogist and the results make the family consider taking a trip overseas. The family decides to do a 5k but tempers quickly flare.
55	8	"Peas Out, Yo!"	December 3, 2024	608	0.86
Everyone prepares for London amid another flare up between Tammy and Amanda. Chris and Tammy visit Dr. Turner hoping to get approved for skin removal surgery. The family participates in a 5K and Amanda makes her move to Florida.
56	9	"Bangers and Clash"	December 10, 2024	609	0.79
The family arrives in London for their first international vacation and learns even more surprising news about their ancestry. Tammy is pushed to her physical limits and a major meltdown puts the rest of the trip in jeopardy.
57	10	"Nothing Is Impastable"	December 17, 2024	610	0.93
The family deals with the aftermath of Amy's meltdown. Back home, Chris gets skin removal surgery. Amy has a risqué photoshoot. Tammy finds doctors who can do her skin removal surgery.

=== Season 7 (2025) ===
No. overall	No. in season	Title	Original release date	Prod. code	U.S. viewers (millions)
58	1	"Thinking With Her Vajayjay"	April 15, 2025	701	0.86
Tammy's skin removal surgery is still up in the air as she struggles to kick bad habits. Amy's got a new roommate and a new man. Chris' plays referee between Brittany and their new neighbor. Tammy is keeping a secret from her family.
59	2	"Smitten Like a New York Kitten"	April 22, 2025	702	0.85
Tammy is pushed to reveal her personal life to her family. Amy's life gets more chaotic. Chris and his wife come to an important decision about her health.
60	3	"Chewy Ca(Ra)mel"	April 29, 2025	703	1.02
Tammy reveals to her sisters that she's dating a woman and their reaction surprises her. Chris and Tammy check-in on their skin removal progress. Amy's life is turned upside down at the petting zoo.
61	4	"The Big Camel in the Room"	May 6, 2025	704	1.02
Amy struggles after her camel bite and arrest. Chris begins a passion project. Tammy fulfills one of her childhood dreams.
62	5	"Keep the Eye on the Tiger"	May 13, 2025	705	1.00
Amy's camel bite leads to unexpected complications. Tammy pursues a major weight-loss milestone. Amy's advancing relationship with her new partner creates family tension.
63	6	"She's Got This Mantality"	May 20, 2025	706	0.99
Amy faces family tension over her blossoming romance while Tammy strives for a major breakthrough in her weight-loss goals.
64	7	"I'm Going to Police-Fully Duck Out"	June 3, 2025	707	1.02
Amy faces the judge for the final time, and the family heads to Pittsburgh for Tammy's skin removal surgery.
65	8	"Her Turkey Gobler's Gone"	June 10, 2025	708	1.10
A missing tool in the operating room causes delays to Tammy's extreme skin removal. Amy decides she's had enough and makes a bold move. Tammy and Amy exchange words that may cause irrevocable changes to their relationship.

=== Season 8 (2026) ===
No. overall	No. in season	Title	Original release date	Prod. code	U.S. viewers (millions)
66	1	"Abysmal to the Wedding"	January 6, 2026	801	N/A
Amy and Tammy are still at odds after their fight following Tammy's skincare surgery. Amy and Brian begin planning their wedding, but their dream venue is already booked out. Tammy and Andrea decide to move-in together. Brittany has started a side hustle making pies. At Misty's birthday party, Amy is upset that the family is talking about Tammy's relationship when she is the one getting married. Amy storms off over her family's reaction when Brian brings up the venue issue.
67	2	"Not Tonight, Satan"	January 13, 2026	802	N/A
Tammy is ready to find her calling and starts her first day as an animal shelter volunteer, Amy makes a big decision for the wedding, and Chris tries to orchestrate peace between Tammy and Amy.
68	3	"Tinture Tantrums"	January 20, 2026	803	N/A
Amy and Brian go ghost hunting. Chris hosts a BBQ to celebrate Brittany's weight loss, but it's quickly overshadowed by Amy's maid of honor reveal. Tammy tries to repair her bond with Amy, but things take another unexpected turn.
69	4	"Nobody's Butt Monkey"	January 27, 2026	804	N/A
Amy moves ahead with securing wedding details without Tammy. Chris and Misty worry about Amy's health. Andrea attempts to broker peace between Tammy and Amy and bring them together for the first time in a week.
70	5	"Idle Hands Are a Devil's B****"	February 3, 2026	805	N/A
Family friend Billy meets with Amy and Brian before officiating their wedding. Andrea meets with Chris without Tammy's knowledge on tips of how to get the sisters back together again. Amy meets with Lee Lee to discuss her intentions of doing an art show. Billy helps Tammy shop for clothes but Tammy has a meltdown when asked about Amy.
71	6	"Reconciling Indifferences"	February 10, 2026	806	N/A
Amy puts on an art show and sells several pieces, but Tammy was not in attendance. The family celebrates Tammy's birthday by go-karting. Amy and Tammy ignore one another. When asked if she wanted to go to with the family to New Orleans, Tammy storms out of the building after having previously rejected the invitation.
72	7	"Bride-Diva"	February 17, 2026	807	N/A
Amy visits the eye doctor who tells her that she can get strabismus surgery to correct her lazy eye. Andrea meets with Darlene to tell her about Tammy's strange behavior. Chris, Brittany, Brian, Amy, and Misty vacation to New Orleans in honor of Brittany's weight loss. Andrea gives Tammy an ultimatum that if she doesn’t change her ways, she will break up with her.
73	8	"Something Borrowed, Someone's Blue"	February 24, 2026	808	N/A
Lee Lee and Billy surprise Amy in New Orleans to throw a bachelorette party while Brian and Chris go frogging. After the vacation Chris and Misty meet with Tammy who explains that her mood swings were caused by having too high of a dose for her medication. Amy and Brian plan the finishing touches of their wedding.
74	9	"Crying Tears of Blood"	March 3, 2026	809	N/A
Amy gets her lazy eye repaired 10 days before her wedding which leaves others concerned about her appearance for the wedding. Tammy makes plans on going to the wedding.
75	10	"Getting Mercinal Right Now"	March 10, 2026	810	N/A
The family gathers to see Amy get married, but a surprising confrontation could derail the biggest day of Amy's life. Amy and Brian's first dance doesn't quite go according to plan, and an unexpected person catches the bouquet.

=== Season 9 (2026) ===
No. overall	No. in season	Title	Original release date	Prod. code	U.S. viewers (millions)
76	1	"Play That Funky Music, AI"	September 1, 2026	901	N/A
Amy attempts to pursue a music career and uses Artificial Intelligence as a tool to create songs for her. Despite deeming Tammy a clingy partner, Andrea proposes to her, and Tammy says yes.
77	2	"Do You Want to Build A... Music Video?"	September 8, 2026	902	N/A
Amy gets approved for skin removal surgery. Tammy meets some of Andrea's friends as plans for their wedding continue. Amy wants her family to be in her music video for her song about Pounds Hollow.
78	3	"It's My Music Video and I'll Cry If I Want To"	September 15, 2026	903	N/A
Amy is disappointed and feels that her older siblings were quick to dismiss her music goals. Tammy and Andrea create a wedding registry. Brittany becomes diabetes free and gets the surgeons permission to attempt to become pregnant.
79	4	"Another BBQ Bites the Dust"	September 22, 2026	904	N/A
After a rift between the older siblings and Amy and Tammy, the family tries to bond with one another and vows to take greater accountability for their actions.
80	5	"Amy Was Afraid, She Was Petrified"	September 29, 2026	905	N/A
Accompanied by Tammy, Amy records her song for the first time with her own voice. Tammy and Andrea go to couples counseling to attempt to learn to not be so dependent on one another.
81	6	"Not So Fast Car"	October 6, 2026	906	N/A
Tammy and Amy attend driving school, where Amy takes her permit test but fails the vision exam. Tammy and Andrea scope out a wedding venue.
82	7	"(Don't) Lean on Me"	October 13, 2026	907	N/A
Amy plans an open microphone night in Nashville, inviting the entire family to attend, while Tammy wants the trip to include only herself, Andrea, Amy, and Brian.
83	8	"Amy In the Sky With Diamonds"	October 20, 2026	908	N/A
Amanda, Misty, and Chris are disgruntled over feeling excluded from the trip to Nashville. Tammy and Amy head to Nashville with their partners, where Amy meets with a record producer that secures her a time slot in the recording booth to record her song.
84	9	"Panicking at the Disco"	October 27, 2026	909	TBD
Amy records her song, "Pounds Hollow." Brittany's pregnancy test comes back negative. Tammy is freightend as Andrea reveals that her lifelong seizures have been getting worse. Amy participates in an open mic night at a Nashville bar but becomes nervous and ends up singing along to the AI-generated version of her song playing back.
85	10	"Sorry (Not) Sorry"	November 3, 2026	910	TBD
Amy meets with a director to plan her music video for Pounds Hollow. Andrea is taken to the ER after fainting from seizure but is able to recover. Tammy celebrates her 40th birthday at Ellis Park, where Chris expresses his support for Andrea in the midst of her medical issues. However, he eventually storms out of the party after feeling that Amanda and Misty were mocking his efforts to show support.
86	11	"Down in Pounds Hollow"	November 10, 2026	911	TBD
