= Pomona Natural Bridge =

Natural bridge in Illinois

- Natural bridge
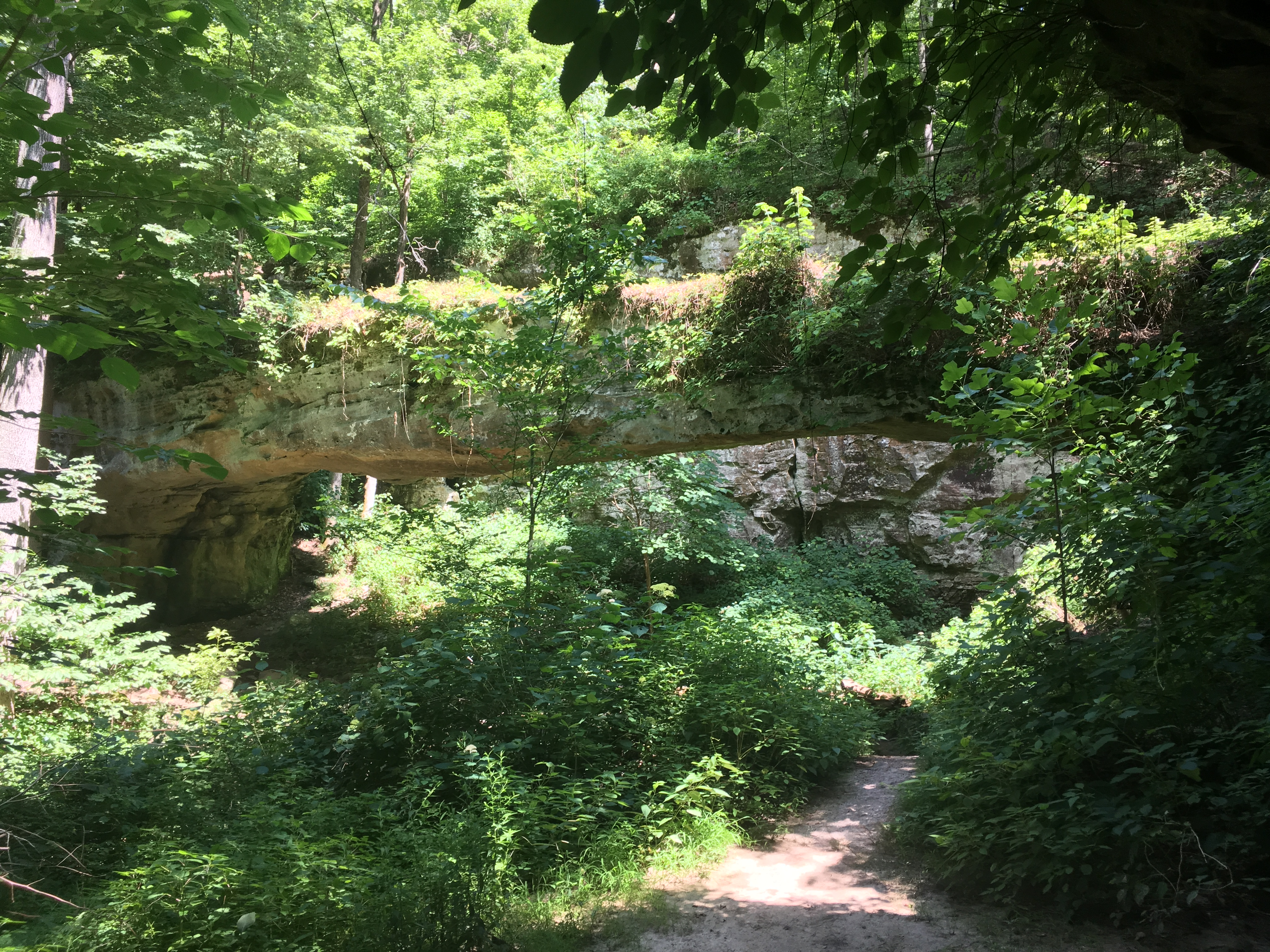

- Location within Illinois
- Coordinates: 37°38′56.45″N 89°20′20.2″W
- Location: Shawnee National Forest
- Formed by: Water
- Geology: Sandstone

Dimensions
  - Length: 30 metres (98 ft)
  - Width: 3 metres (9.8 ft)
  - Depth: 3 metres (9.8 ft)
  - Height: 9.1 metres (30 ft)

The Pomona Natural Bridge is a natural bridge approximately 30m long, 3m wide, and 3m thick, located near Pomona, Illinois. It is in the Shawnee National Forest. A small unnamed stream flows beneath the bridge.

== Gallery ==
Pomona Natural Bridge
Filmed by Tom Kent in 2010

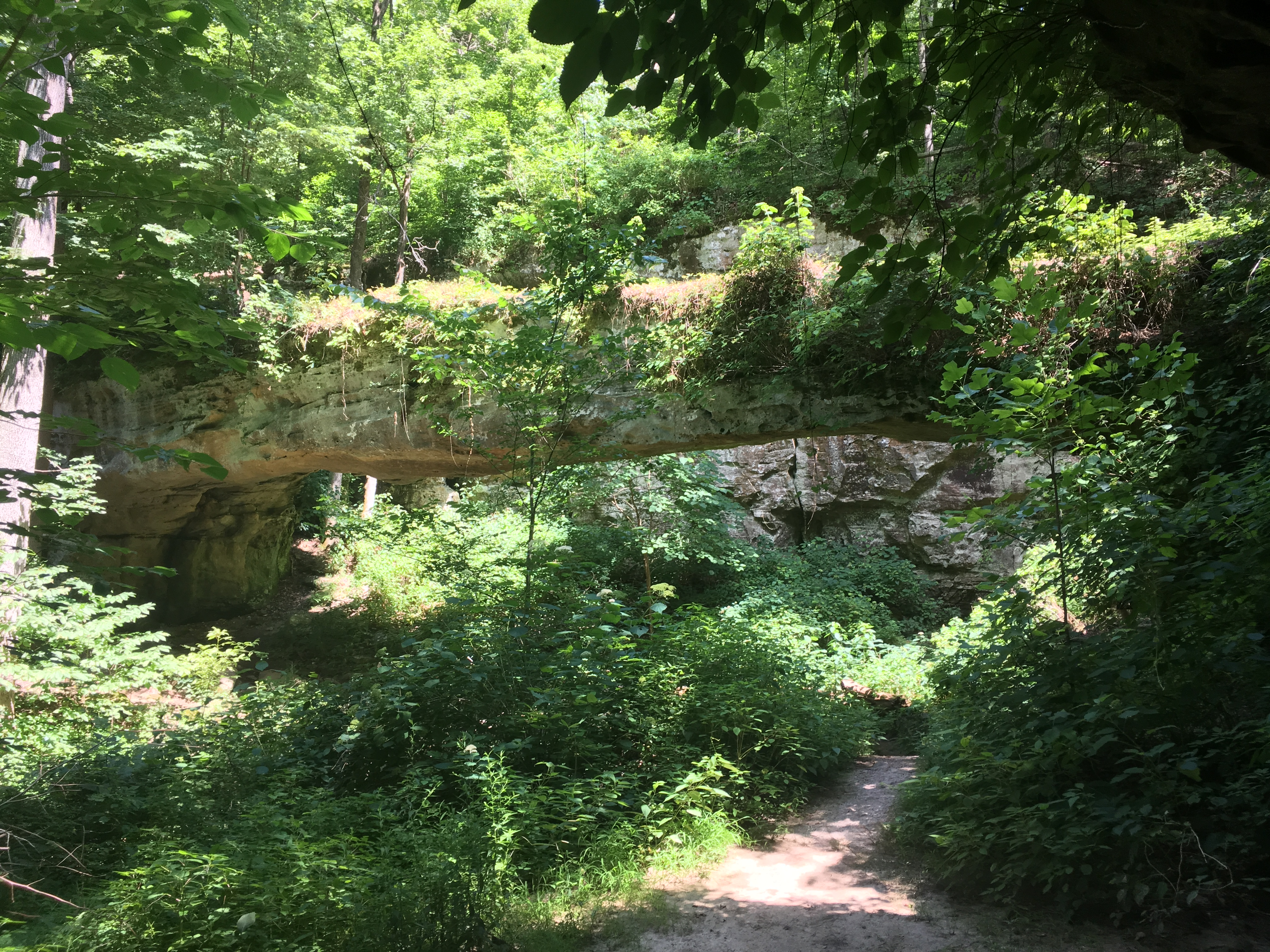
Pomona Natural Bridge as in appeared in 2017

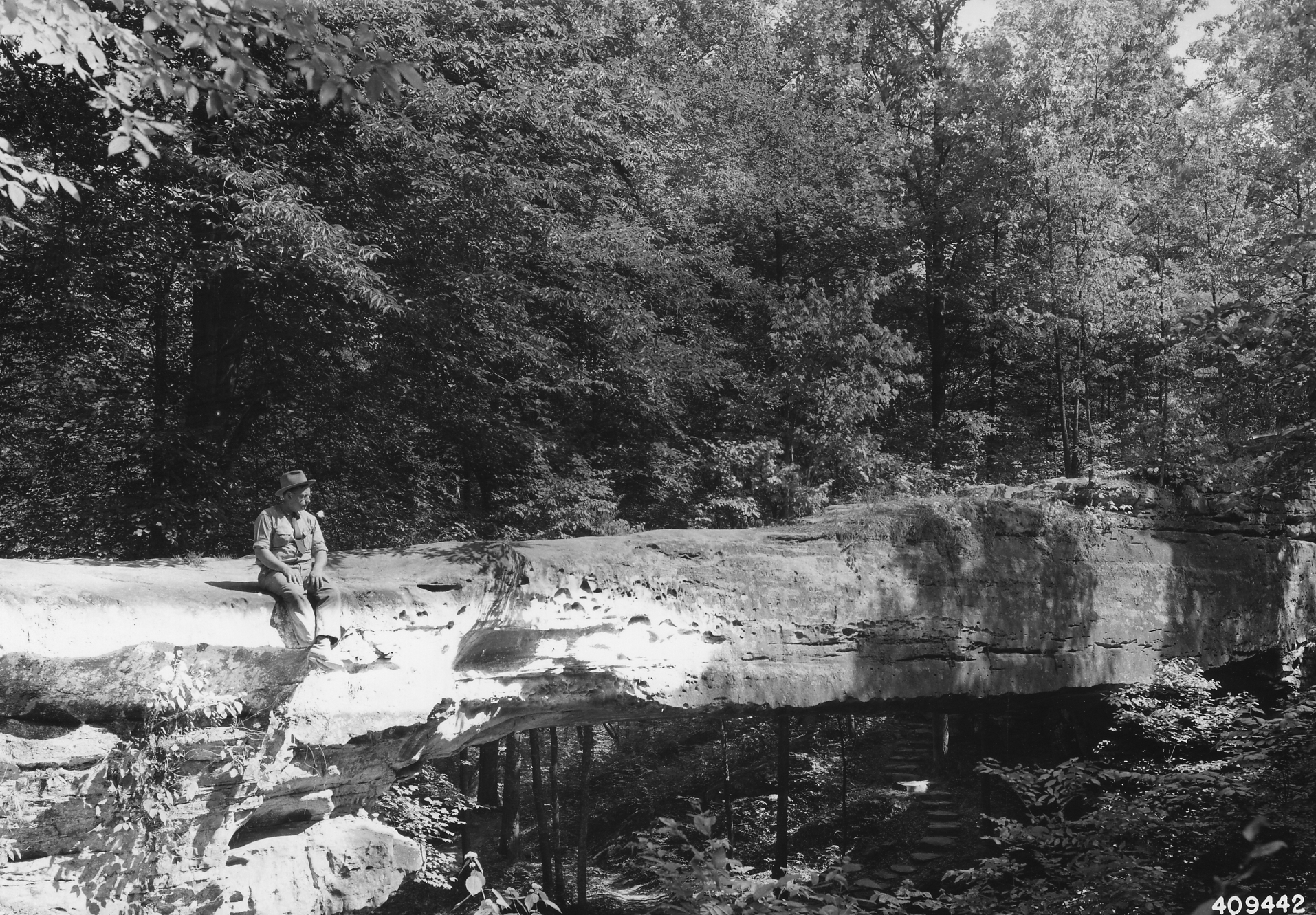
Pomona Natural Bridge as it appeared in 1968

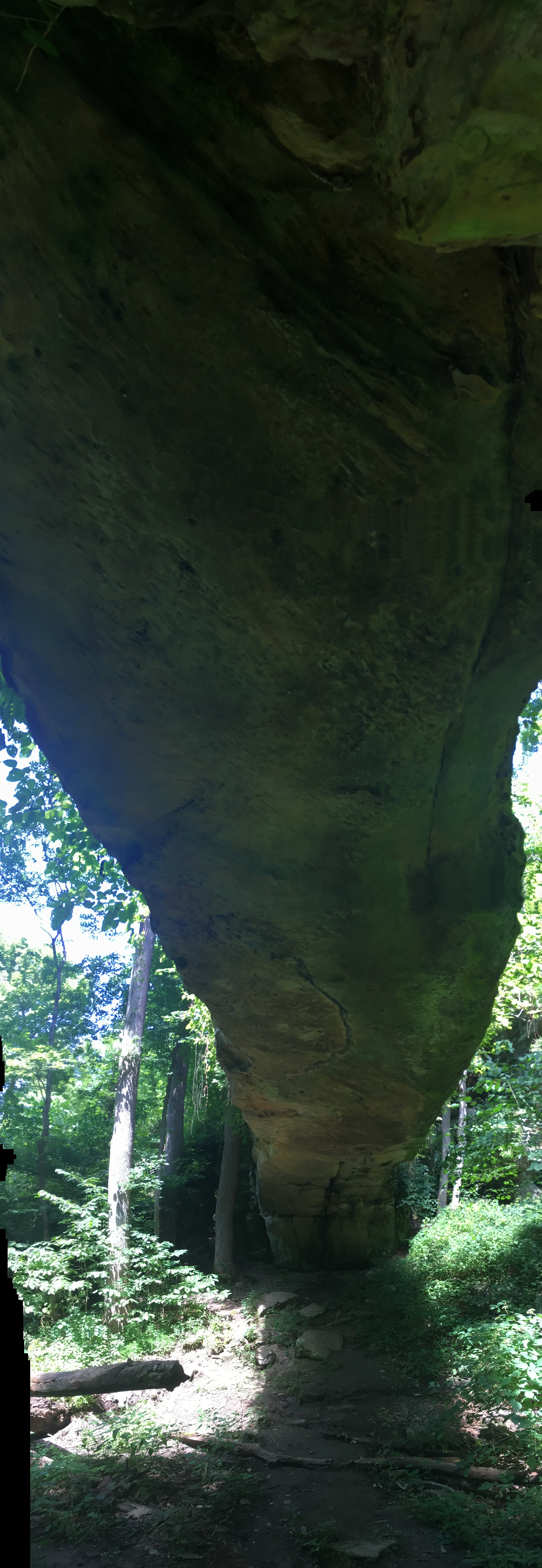
The underside of the bridge
