= Garden of the Gods Wilderness =

Wilderness area in Illinois, United States

Coordinates: 37°36′25″N 88°23′41″W

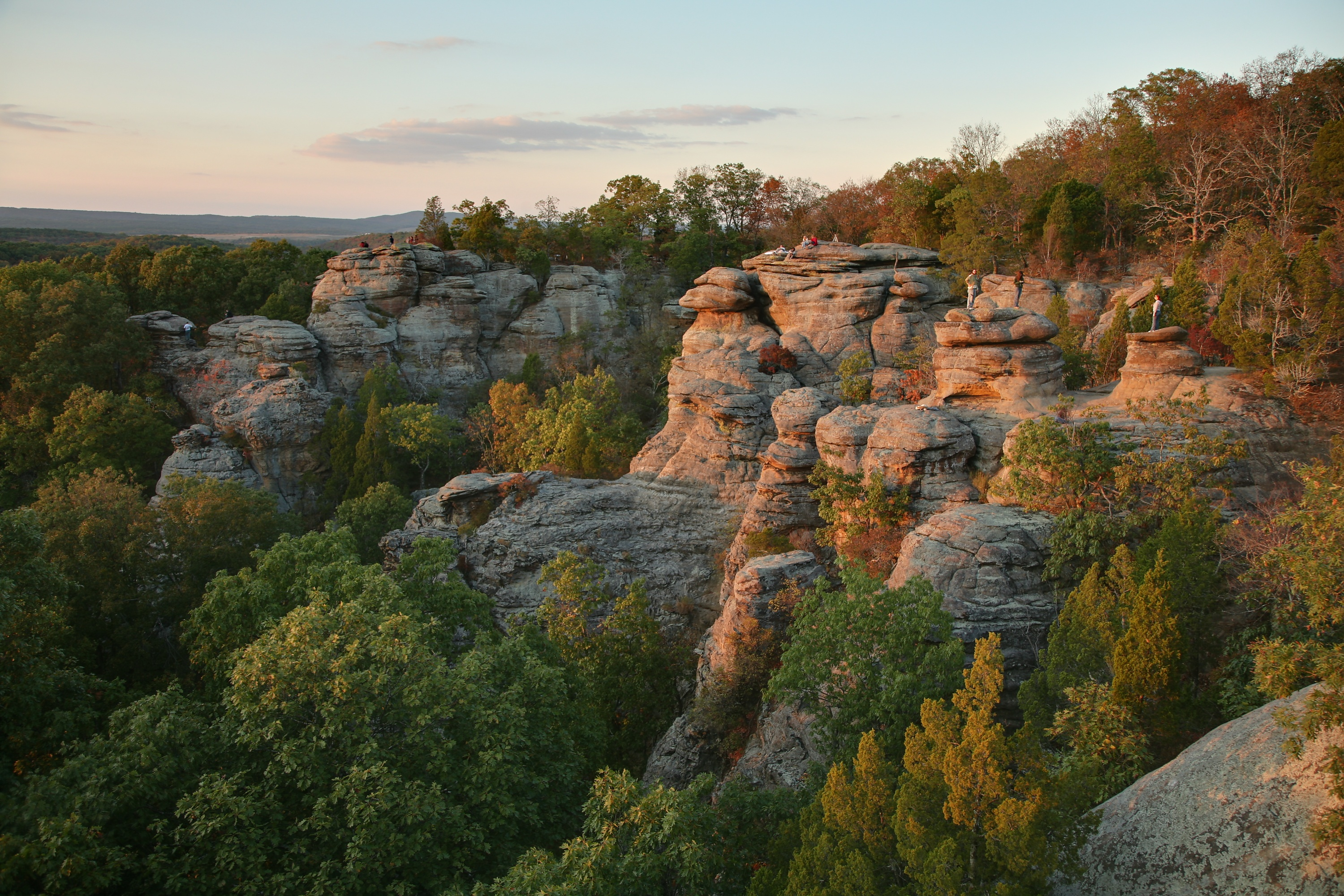
Sunset on the Garden of the Gods Wilderness

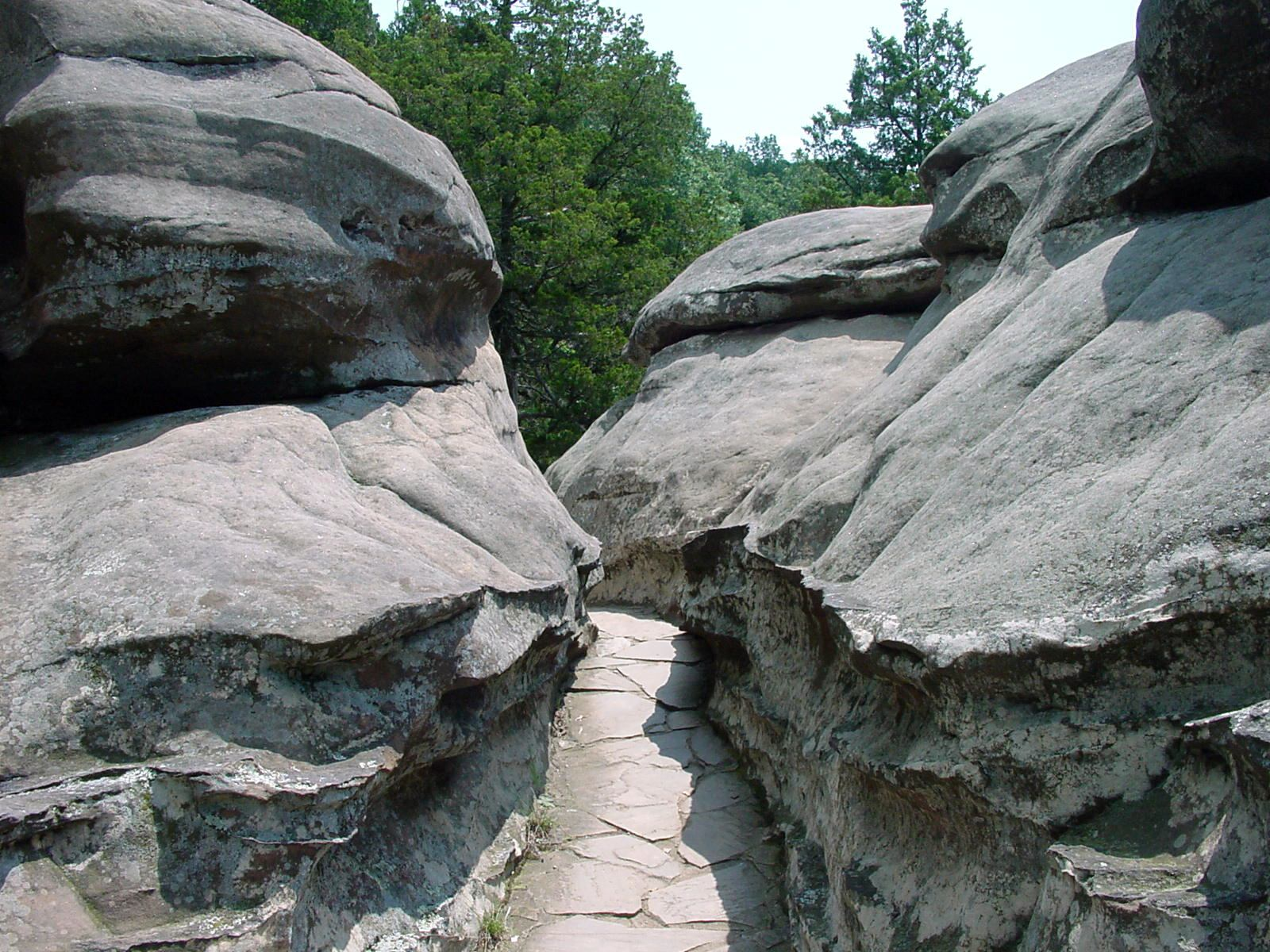
Passage between the Wilderness' rocks

The Garden of the Gods Wilderness is a 3,318-acre (13.43 km^{2}) parcel of land listed as a Wilderness Area of the United States. It is located within the Shawnee National Forest in Hardin, Pope, Saline, and Gallatin counties in the U.S. state of Illinois. The nearest municipality of any size is the village of Equality.

== Geology ==
During the Carboniferous period (circa 300 million years before the present), local geological conditions laid down a thick bed of gray sandstone in what is now southern Illinois. This bed of sandstone was later uplifted, and the Garden of the Gods is part of an uplifted sandstone plateau. Unlike much of Illinois, this plateau was never covered by glaciers; the furthest advance of ice sheets during the Illinoian glaciation stopped just north of Garden of the Gods.

The morphology of Garden of the Gods is much steeper and rockier than in much of Illinois. Comparatively dramatic erosion patterns have created hoodoos and other unusual sandstone formations, as well as scenic overlooks such as Buzzards Point from which raptors, scavenger birds, and humans can look out over the Shawnee National Forest. Several of the hoodoos have evocative names, including Anvil Rock, Camel Rock, and Table Rock.

As with other wilderness areas within Shawnee National Forest, the Garden of the Gods Wilderness is made of second-growth forested areas that were used for farming until the land acquisitions of the 1930s.

== History ==
Shawnee National Forest was created in 1939. In 1990, Congressman Glenn Poshard sponsored and Congress passed the Illinois Wilderness Act, which set aside seven separate parcels of land within this National Forest as relatively small wilderness areas. The Garden of the Gods Wilderness, one of these parcels, is a roadless parcel of land within the national forest.

A tongue of non-wilderness land provides a route for a paved road from Buzzards Point to a hiking, campsite, and public-use location in the southeastern corner of Saline County. From this location, hiking trails provide access to much of the Wilderness, making Garden of the Gods the most-visited wilderness area in Illinois. The trails and overlooks are often utilized by visitors during the fall color season. Garden of the Gods Wilderness is served by the River to River Trail.

In 2016, 300 million quarters were minted that featured an image of a hoodoo from the Garden of the Gods Wilderness. An image of Camel Rock was struck on one set of quarters as part of the U.S. Mint's 56-image America the Beautiful series.
