= Pounds Hollow Recreation Area =

Recreation area in Illinois, United States

Coordinates: 37°37′1″N 88°16′18″W

Pounds Hollow Recreation Area is a signposted recreation area in Gallatin County, Illinois within Shawnee National Forest. The sandstone bluffs of the hollow provide a setting for camping, picnicking, fishing, and light boating. The recreation area is located near Karbers Ridge, an unincorporated hamlet within nearby Hardin County, Illinois.

== Description ==
Pounds Hollow centers on a small reservoir built in the wooded hollow of the same name by the Civilian Conservation Corps. Completed "in the early 1940's", the recreation area was built as a spot for motor camping and picnicking. CCC workers used local sandstone to build footings for the CCC-characteristic campsite kiosk. The campsite has 35 campsites, 13 with electricity. A camping fee is charged. Other assets of the recreation area include swimming, picnicking, pier fishing, and hiking at and around the 25-acre artificial lake. Thee is no boat ramp, and boats that burn motor fuel are not allowed.

The small lake and recreation area are located in Eagle Creek Township in southwestern Gallatin County. The lake feeds a succession of creeks, which eventually discharge into the Saline River. Illinois Route 1 closely approaches and serves the recreation area.
