= Shawnee National Forest =

Federally managed lands in Illinois

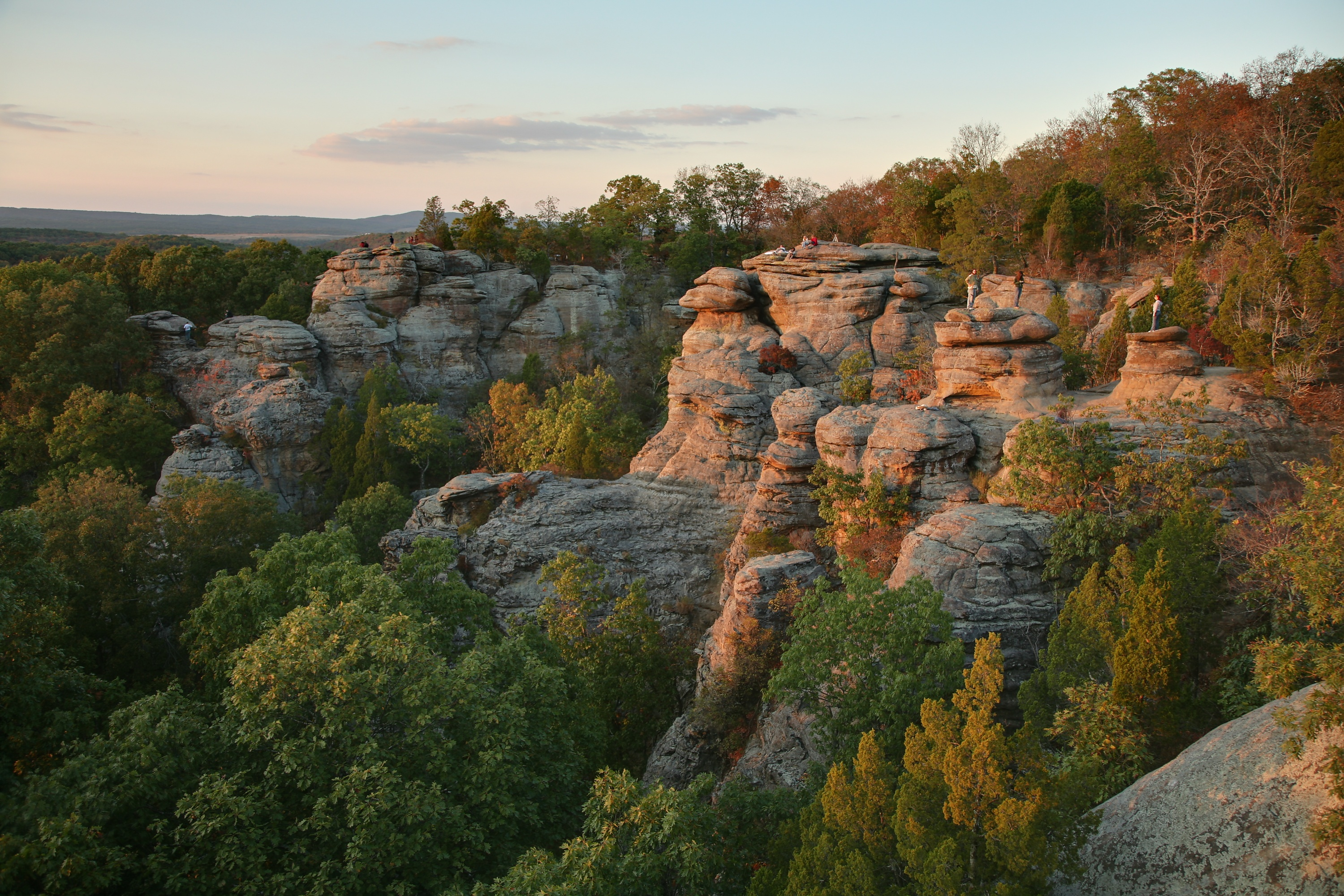
- Garden of the Gods Wilderness
- Interactive map of Shawnee National Forest
- Location: Illinois, U.S.
- Nearest city: Harrisburg, Illinois
- Coordinates: 37°30′N 88°40′W
- Area: 498,616 acres (2,017.83 km^{2})
- Established: August 1933
- Governing body: U.S. Forest Service
- Website: Shawnee National Forest

Shawnee National Forest is a United States National Forest located in the Shawnee Hills of Southern Illinois, United States. Administered by the United States Forest Service, it consists of approximately 498,615 acres (201,782 ha) of federally managed lands. In descending order of land area it is located in parts of Pope, Jackson, Union, Hardin, Alexander, Saline, Gallatin, Johnson, and Massac counties. Forest headquarters are located in Harrisburg, Illinois. There are local ranger district offices in Jonesboro and Vienna. Shawnee National Forest is also the single largest publicly owned body of land in Illinois.

== History ==
Designated as the Illini and Shawnee Purchase Units, President Franklin D. Roosevelt declared these purchase units to be the Shawnee National Forest in September 1939. Most of the land added to the Forest in its first decade of existence was exhausted farmland. Throughout the 1930s and 1940s, the Civilian Conservation Corps planted pine trees to prevent erosion and help rebuild the soil. However, the Forest is also home to many hardwood trees and other plant and animal species characteristic of the region.

In the 1980s and 1990s, there was an active history of conservation and protest efforts by local, regional, and national environmental groups and individuals ranging from radical movements such as Earth First! to mainstream organizations such as the Sierra Club and the Green Party. The wise use movement once played an active role in lobbying for its vision of the Shawnee National Forest. Today a more cooperative atmosphere has developed, although some controversy remains with a few.

In 2006, the U.S. Forest Service completed the development of a new Forest Management Plan for the Shawnee National Forest. This plan, adopted every 10–15 years, outlines the policies and practices of the U.S. Forest Service in overseeing the management of the Shawnee National Forest. The 2006 Forest Plan was completed in collaboration with many environmental and public groups and is designed to maintain and enhance the forest's unique biodiversity.

Shawnee National Forest appeared on the thirty-first quarter in the America the Beautiful Quarters series in 2016.

== Geology ==
During the Illinoian Stage (between 352,000 and 132,000 years ago), the Laurentide Ice Sheet covered up to 85 percent of Illinois. The southern margin of this ice sheet was located within what is now the area of the Shawnee National Forest. There are many points of interest marking the southern edge of the glacier. Some are located within the Forest boundary, others are on public land in proximity.

Little Grand Canyon is located within the Shawnee National Forest. This is accessible off Illinois Route 127 south of Murphysboro, Illinois. A small creek with a tiny watershed has carved an impressive rock canyon, more than 200 feet deep, leading down to the Big Muddy River. The southern edge of the ice sheet was just to the north of Little Grand Canyon. Blocks of ice slid off the face of the glacier, carried by enormous volumes of meltwater, to carve this tiny canyon. In the deep shade of the canyon are relict species of Arctic plants left over from its ancient origin.

Cedar Lake is an artificial lake formed by damming Cedar Creek. The lake is accessible off Illinois Route 127, south of Murphysboro, and off U.S. 51, south of Carbondale. In this area, the Illinoian Glacier climbed the Shawnee Hills at its southern margin. The glacier blocked the waterways flowing north down the hills. This drainage formed a creek running northwest along the face of the glacier. This became Cedar Creek, the watershed of which is extremely asymmetrical. While the watershed extends only a few thousand feet to the south, up the face of the terminal moraine, the creek is also fed by waterways extending miles to the south.

Within the area of the Shawnee National Forest, but not at this time US property, is Hicks Dome, an igneous feature in Hardin County, Illinois. This was formerly speculated to be the result of a meteorite impact, but some argue it was caused by igneous activity.

== Recreation ==
There are seven officially designated wilderness areas lying within Shawnee National Forest that are part of the National Wilderness Preservation System:

- Bald Knob Wilderness
- Bay Creek Wilderness
- Burden Falls Wilderness
- Clear Springs Wilderness
- Garden of the Gods Wilderness
- Lusk Creek Wilderness
- Panther Den Wilderness

Pounds Hollow Recreation Area is also located within the forest. In northwestern Pope County, Jackson Falls is a noted location for rock climbing and speed climbing.

The Shawnee National Forest was among the best sites from which to view the solar eclipse of August 21, 2017, with two minutes 44 seconds of totality and was again in 2024, with four minutes and seven seconds of totality.

== Gallery ==
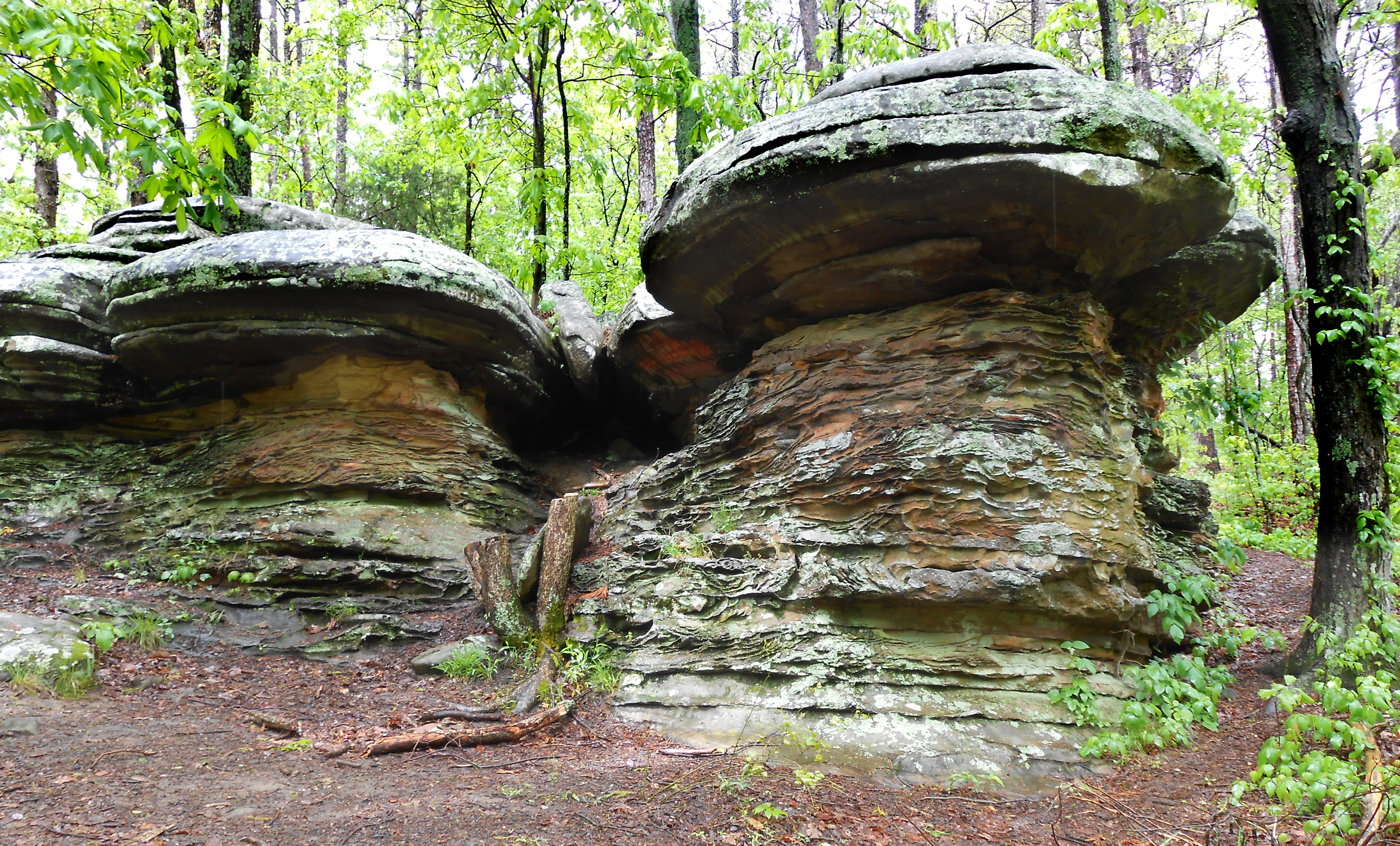
Rock formations near a hiking trail

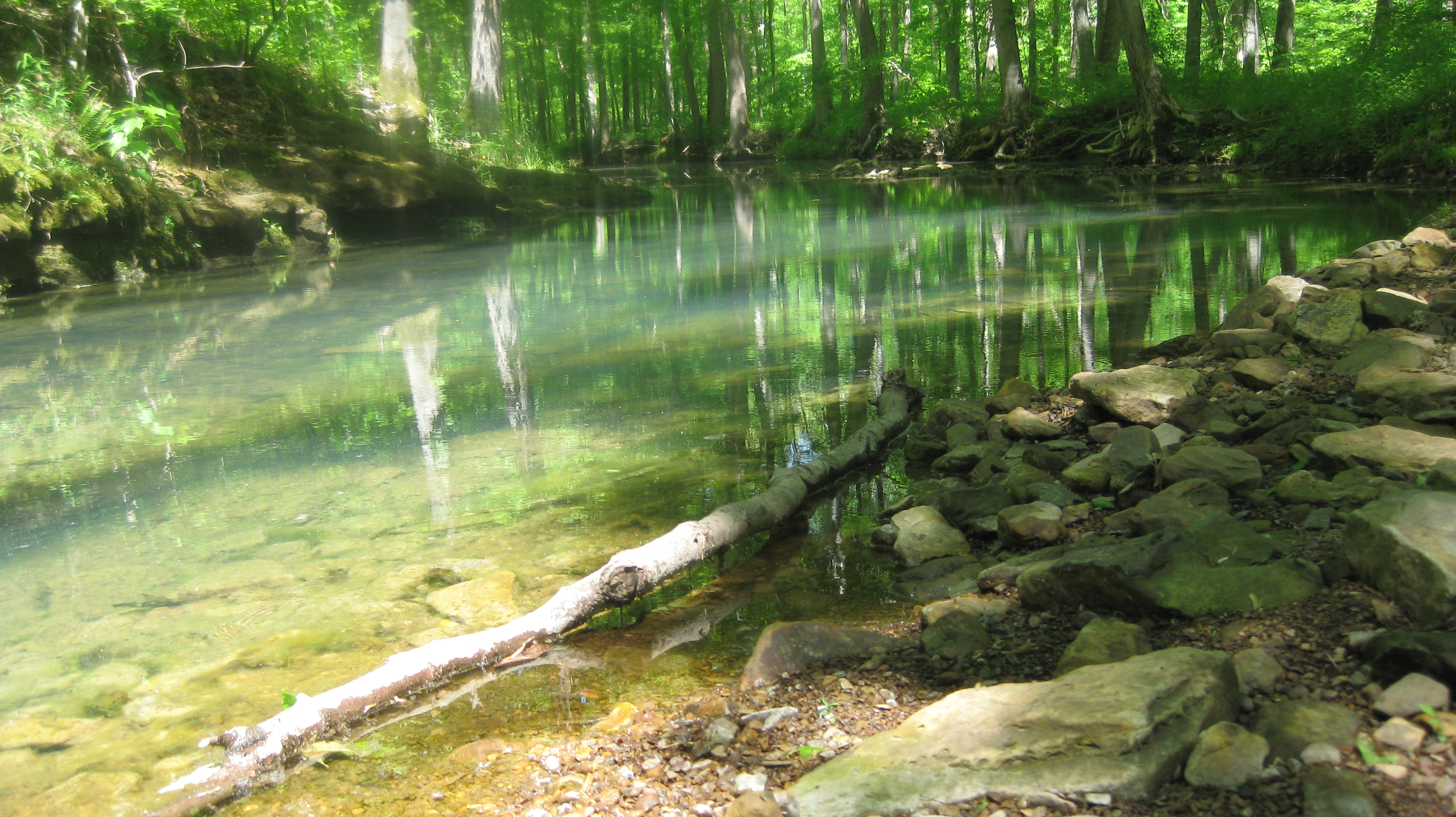
Runoff of Devil's Kitchen Lake in the Panther Den Wilderness

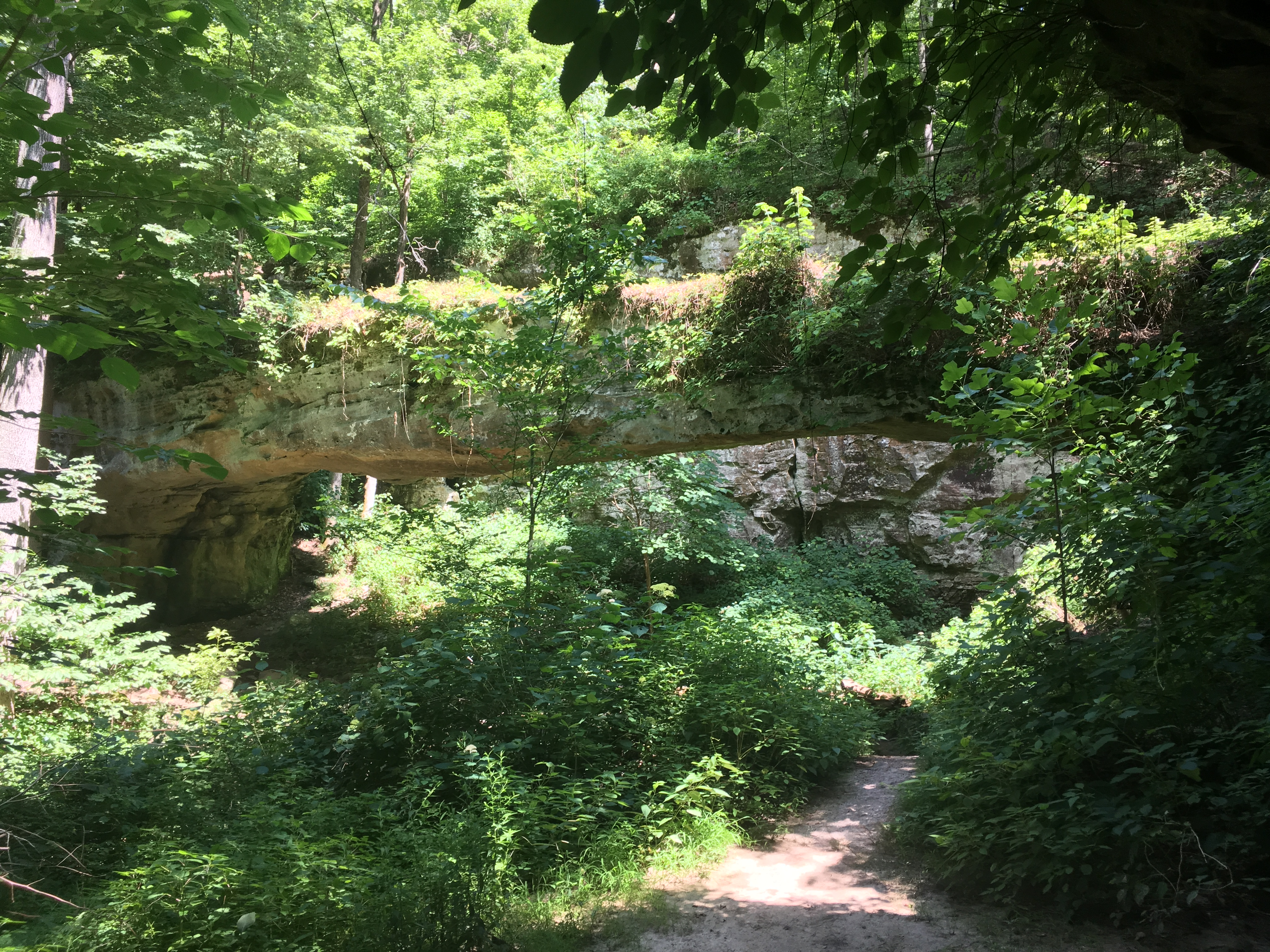
Pomona Natural Bridge

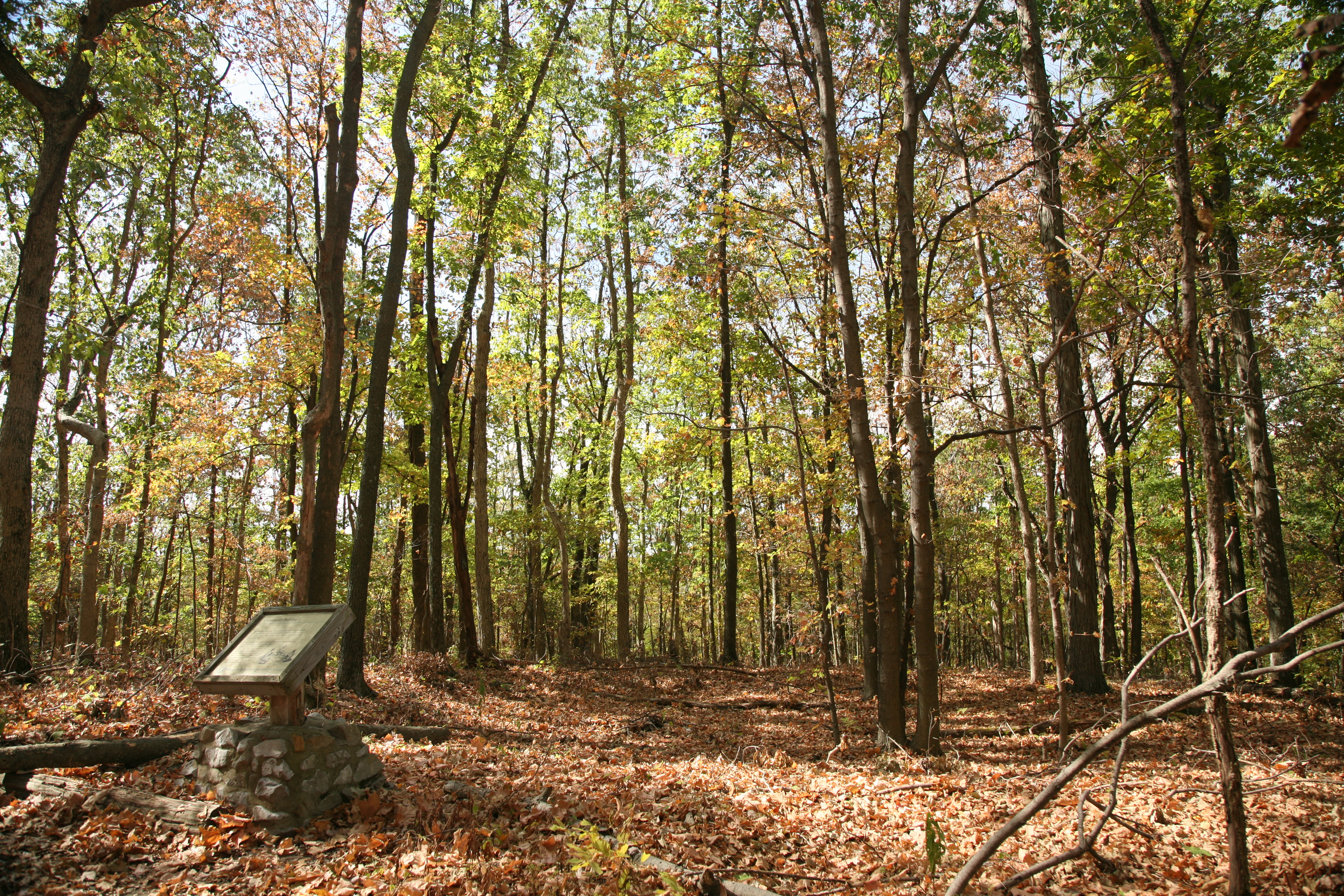
Millstone Bluff

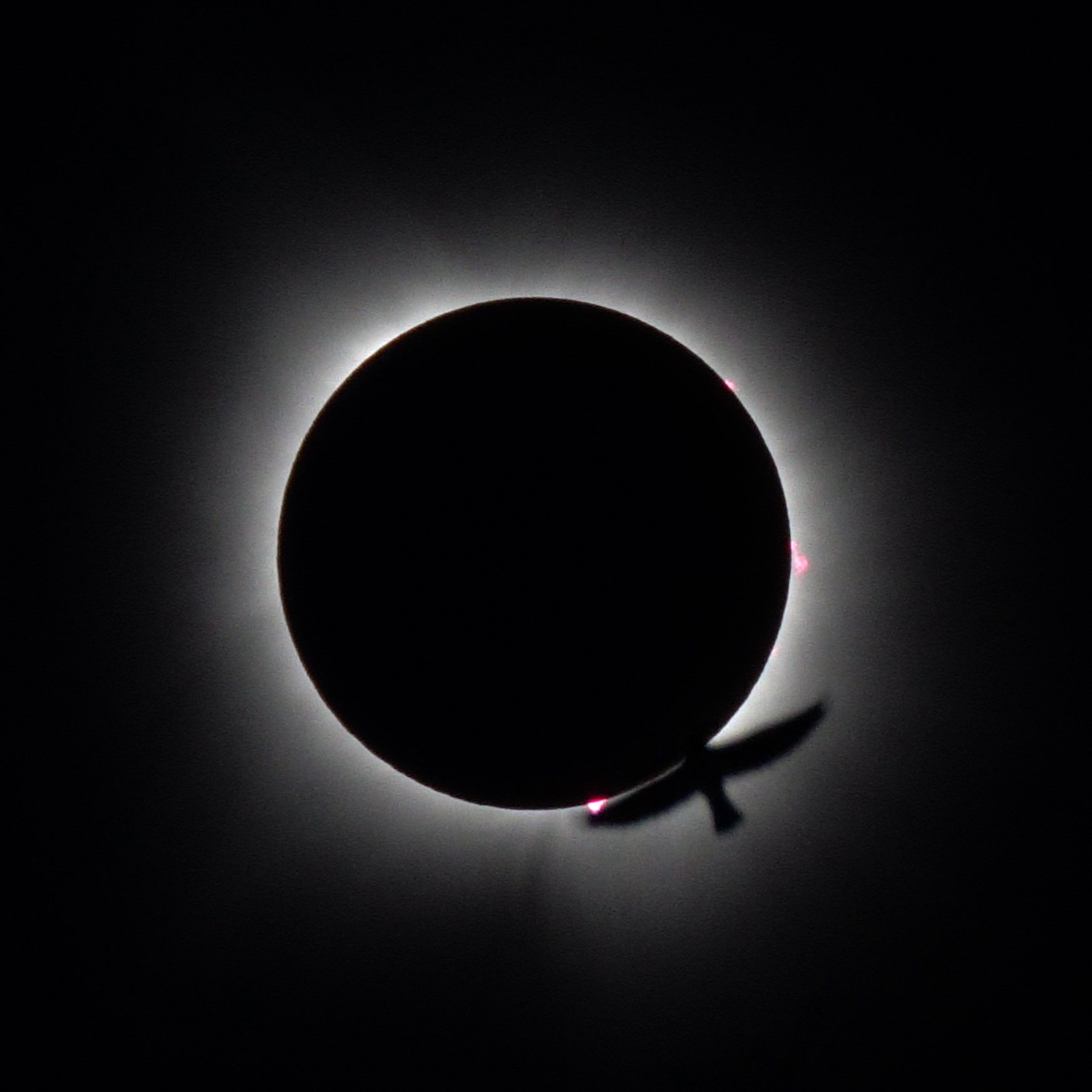
Bird transits during totality at Kincaid Lake in the Shawnee National Forest during the April 8, 2024 total solar eclipse

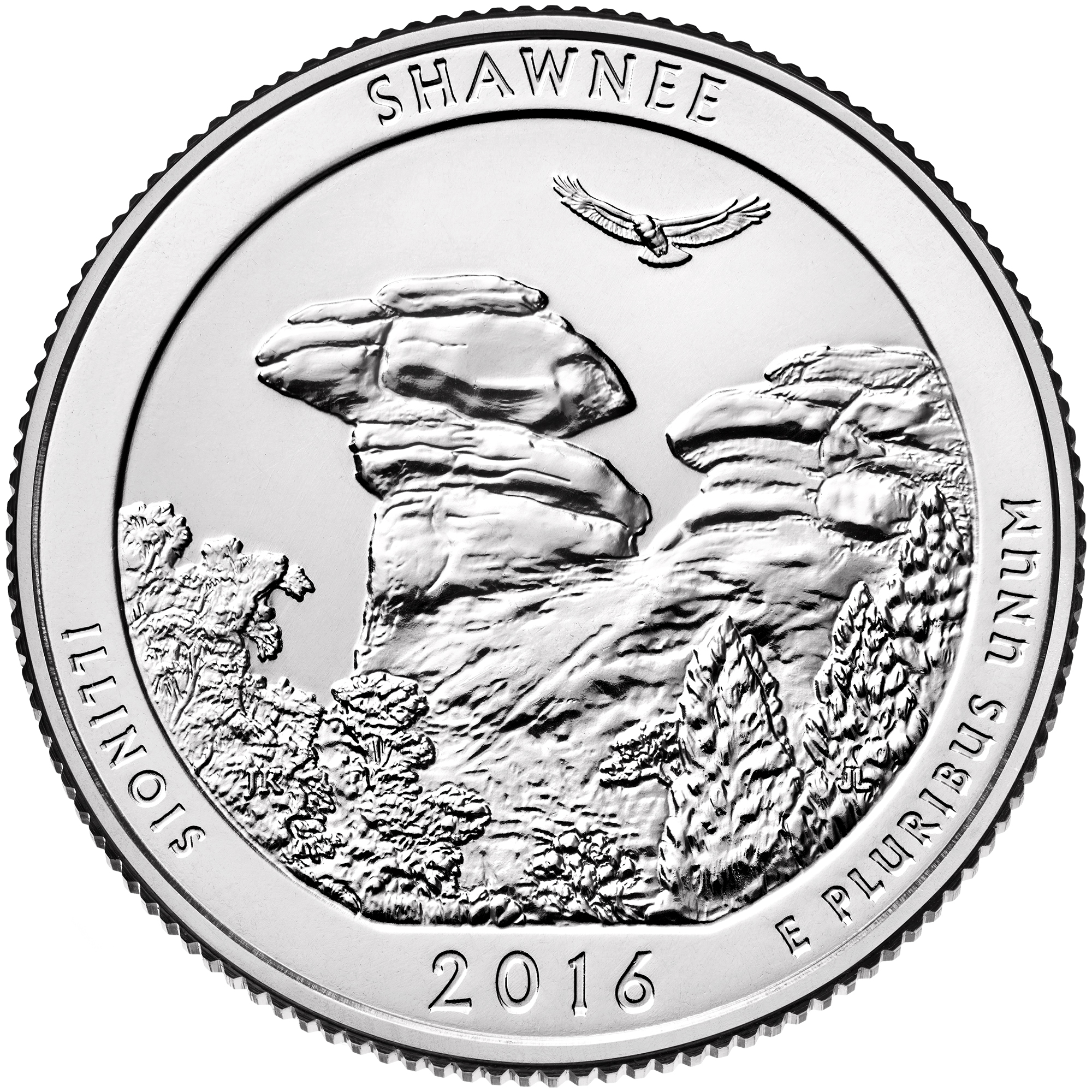
Shawnee National Forest is featured on the Illinois America the Beautiful quarter.

== See also ==
- List of national forests of the United States
