= Eddyville, Illinois =

Eddyville
- Village
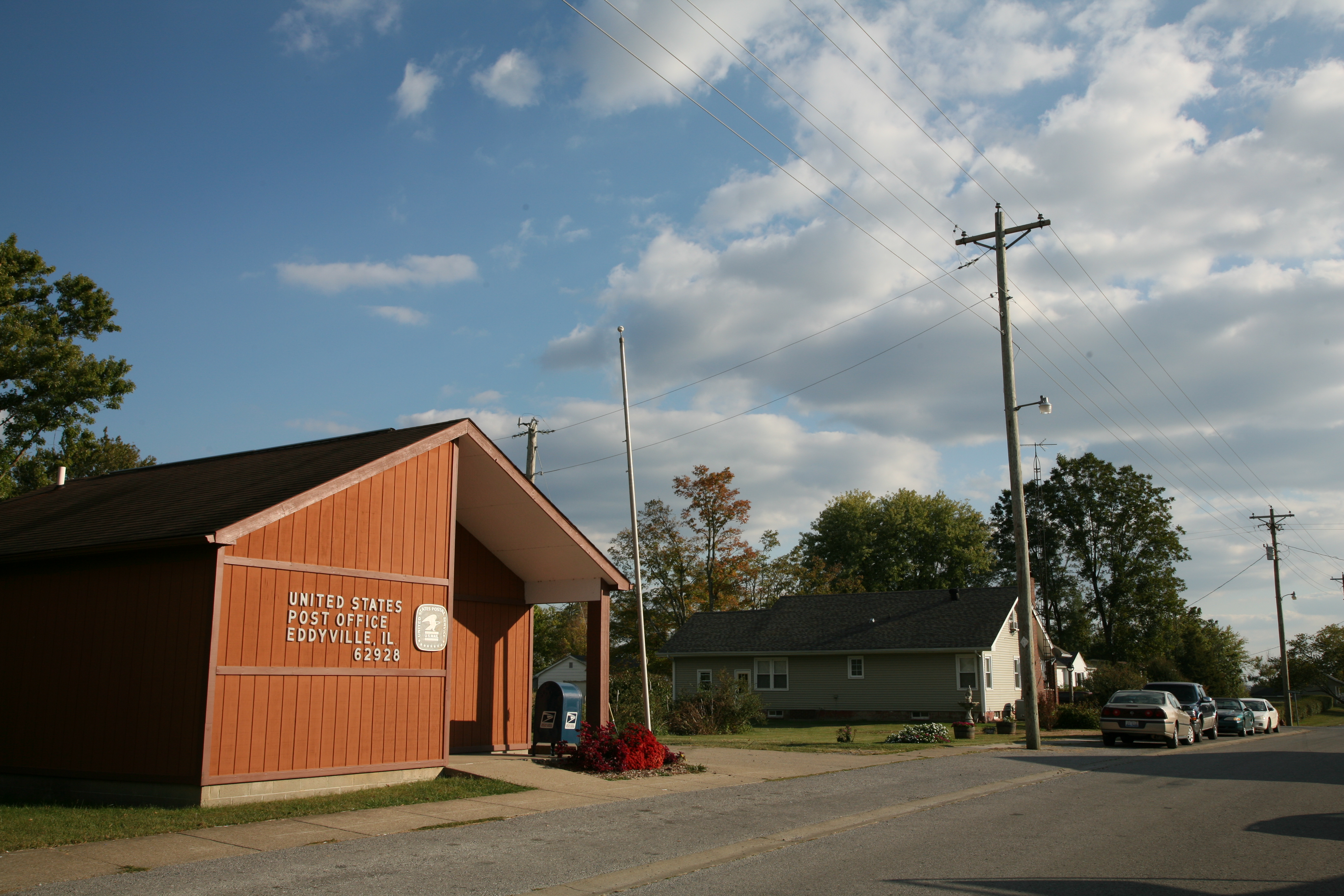
- Eddyville post office on Main St.

- Location of Eddyville in Pope County, Illinois.
- Coordinates: 37°29′57″N 88°35′05″W
- Country: United States
- State: Illinois
- County: Pope

Area
  - Total: 0.28 sq mi (0.73 km^{2})
  - Land: 0.28 sq mi (0.73 km^{2})
  - Water: 0 sq mi (0.00 km^{2})
- Elevation: 682 ft (208 m)

Population (2020)
  - Total: 99
  - Density: 352.3/sq mi (136.01/km^{2})
- Time zone: UTC-6 (CST)
  - Summer (DST): UTC-5 (CDT)
- ZIP code: 62928
- Area code: 618
- FIPS code: 17-22398
- GNIS ID: 2398782

Eddyville is a village in Pope County, Illinois, United States. As of the 2020 census, Eddyville had a population of 99. Two designated wilderness areas, the Burden Falls Wilderness and the Lusk Creek Wilderness, are nearby.

== History ==
Eddyville was laid out in 1866, and named for Edward Fulghum, who owned the land where the village is located. A post office has been in operation at Eddyville since 1869. Eddyville was incorporated as a village in 1883.

== Geography ==
According to the 2010 census, Eddyville has a total area of 0.291 square miles (0.75 km^{2}), of which 0.29 square miles (0.75 km^{2}) (or 99.66%) is land and 0.001 square miles (0.00 km^{2}) (or 0.34%) is water.

== Demographics ==
Historical population
Census	Pop.	Note	%±
1880	114		—
1890	212		86.0%
1900	162		−23.6%
1910	145		−10.5%
1920	173		19.3%
1930	115		−33.5%
1940	144		25.2%
1950	106		−26.4%
1960	125		17.9%
1970	127		1.6%
1980	143		12.6%
1990	151		5.6%
2000	153		1.3%
2010	101		−34.0%
2020	99		−2.0%
U.S. Decennial Census

As of the census of 2000, there were 153 people, 65 households, and 41 families residing in the village. The population density was 533.1 inhabitants per square mile (205.8/km^{2}). There were 78 housing units at an average density of 271.8 per square mile (104.9/km^{2}). The racial makeup of the village was 93.46% White, 1.31% Native American, 1.31% Asian, 0.65% from other races, and 3.27% from two or more races. Hispanic or Latino of any race were 0.65% of the population.

There were 65 households, out of which 38.5% had children under the age of 18 living with them, 46.2% were married couples living together, 16.9% had a female householder with no husband present, and 35.4% were non-families. 35.4% of all households were made up of individuals, and 16.9% had someone living alone who was 65 years of age or older. The average household size was 2.35 and the average family size was 3.05.

In the village, the population was spread out, with 30.1% under the age of 18, 7.2% from 18 to 24, 29.4% from 25 to 44, 18.3% from 45 to 64, and 15.0% who were 65 years of age or older. The median age was 34 years. For every 100 females, there were 109.6 males. For every 100 females age 18 and over, there were 84.5 males.

The median income for a household in the village was $22,083, and the median income for a family was $40,000. Males had a median income of $22,500 versus $20,000 for females. The per capita income for the village was $13,084. About 13.9% of families and 16.8% of the population were below the poverty line, including 32.3% of those under the age of eighteen and 5.9% of those 65 or over.
