= Illinois Route 157 =

State highway in St. Clair and Madison counties in Illinois, US

Illinois Route 157
- IL 157 highlighted in red

Route information
- Maintained by IDOT
- Length: 35.50 mi (57.13 km)
- Existed: 1926–present

Major junctions
- South end: IL 3 in Cahokia
- I-255 / US 50 in Cahokia; I-64 / US 50 in Fairview Heights; I-55 / I-70 / US 40 in Collinsville; I-270 in Glen Carbon
- North end: IL 140 in Hamel

Location
- Country: United States
- State: Illinois
- Counties: St. Clair, Madison

Highway system
- Illinois State Highway System; Interstate; US; State; Tollways; Scenic
← IL 156	→ IL 158

Illinois Route 157 (IL 157) is a 35.50-mile-long (57.13 km) north–south state highway in the southwestern part of the U.S. state of Illinois. The southern terminus of the highway is at an intersection with IL 3 in Cahokia. The northern terminus of the highway is at an intersection with IL 140 in Hamel.

== Route description ==
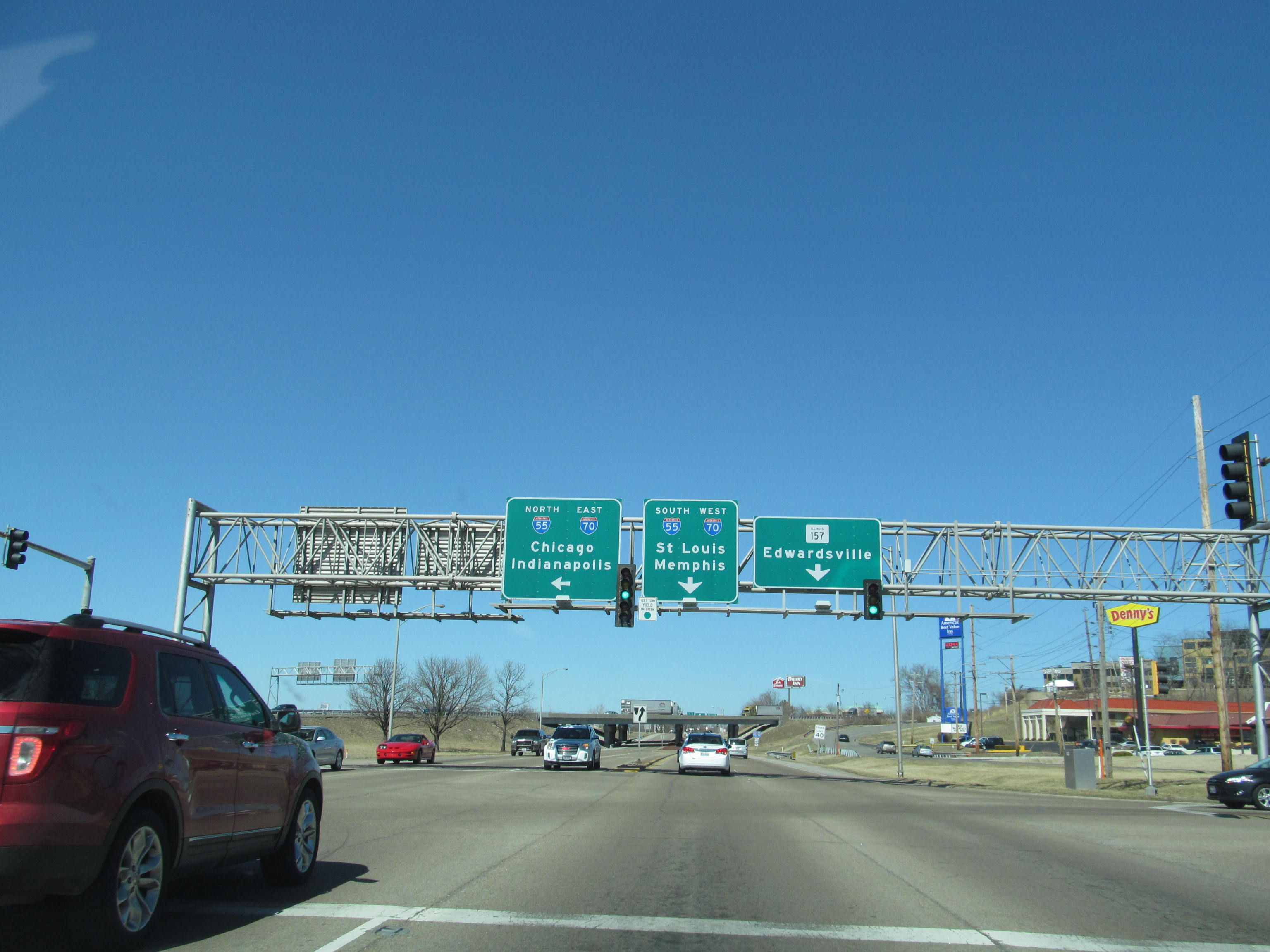
IL 157 at its intersection with I-55 and I-70

IL 157 travels concurrent with IL 13 and IL 163 in Centreville and IL 159 and IL 143 in Edwardsville. IL 157 is the major north–south road through the busiest towns in Madison County – Collinsville and Edwardsville.

The segment of the highway in Cahokia Heights from IL 3 to IL 13 is known as Camp Jackson Road.

The segment of the highway north from IL 13 to approximately Interstate 270 (I-270) is known as Bluff Road, because it roughly follows the eastern bluffs of the Mississippi River which define the American Bottoms in Madison and St. Clair counties.

== History ==
State Bond Issue Route (SBI) Route 157 originally traveled from Cahokia to Glen Carbon. It was then extended to the Missouri state line at the Jefferson Barracks Bridge in 1946; this was undone by 1958. In 1965, the northern terminus was moved to Hamel, replacing U.S. Route 66 Bypass (US 66 Byp.), which itself was the US 66 mainline prior to 1957.

== Major intersections ==
County	Location	mi	km	Destinations	Notes
St. Clair	Cahokia	0.0	0.0	IL 3 / Great River Road – East St. Louis	Southern terminus of IL 157
St. Clair	Cahokia	2.0	3.2	I-255 / US 50 – Chicago, Memphis	I-255 exit 13
St. Clair		5.1	8.2	IL 163 south (Millstadt Rd) – Millstadt	South end of IL 163 concurrency
St. Clair	Centreville	5.6	9.0	IL 163 north / IL 13 – Alorton	North end of IL 163 concurrency; south end of IL 13 concurrency; western terminus of IL 13
St. Clair	Centreville	6.0	9.7	IL 13 east – Belleville	North end of IL 13 concurrency
St. Clair	Centreville	6.8	10.9	IL 15 – East St. Louis, Belleville	interchange
St. Clair	East St. Louis	9.9	15.9	IL 161 south (St. Clair Ave) – Fairview Heights	Northern terminus of IL 161; interchange
St. Clair	Caseyville	10.2	16.4	I-64 / US 50 – Mt. Vernon, St. Louis	I-64 exit 9
Madison	Collinsville	16.3	26.2	I-55 / I-70 / US 40 – Chicago, Indianapolis, St. Louis, Memphis	I-55 / I-70 exit 11
Madison	Glen Carbon	20.6	33.2	IL 162 east – Troy	South end of IL 162 concurrency
Madison	Glen Carbon	20.7	33.3	IL 162 west – Granite City	North end of IL 162 concurrency
Madison	Glen Carbon	21.7	34.9	I-270 – Effingham, St. Charles	I-270 exit 9
Madison	Glen Carbon	22.1	35.6	Historic US 66 west (Chain of Rocks Road)	Southwestern end of Historic US 66 overlap
Madison	Edwardsville	27.1	43.6	IL 143 west / IL 159 (Main St)	South end of IL 143 concurrency
Madison	Edwardsville	27.6	44.4	IL 143 west (E Vandalia St)	North end of IL 143 concurrency
Madison	Hamel	35.50	57.13	IL 140 (State St) – Alton, Greenville	Northeastern end of Historic US 66 overlap; northern terminus
Madison	Hamel			Historic US 66 east	Continuation beyond IL 157
1.000 mi = 1.609 km; 1.000 km = 0.621 mi: Concurrency terminus

== See also ==
- List of state routes in Illinois
