= Illinois Route 161 =

State highway in southern Illinois, US

Illinois Route 161
- IL 161 highlighted in red

Route information
- Maintained by IDOT
- Length: 67.24 mi (108.21 km)
- Existed: 1926–present

Major junctions
- West end: IL 157 in East St. Louis
- I-64 in New Baden; US 51 in Centralia; I-57 in Kell
- East end: IL 37 in Kell

Location
- Country: United States
- State: Illinois
- Counties: St. Clair, Clinton, Marion

Highway system
- Illinois State Highway System; Interstate; US; State; Tollways; Scenic
← IL 160	→ IL 162

Illinois Route 161 (abbreviated IL 161) is an east–west highway with its western terminus at St. Clair Avenue in Fairview Heights and its official eastern terminus at Illinois Route 37 near Kell. This is an official distance of 67.24 miles (108.21 km).

The road continues, as various county routes, eastbound beyond Illinois 37 to Allendale at Illinois Route 1. To locals, this part of the highway is known as "The Extension", referring to the fact that road "Extends" on after its official end.

== Route description ==
Illinois 161 runs along portions of what once was U.S. Route 50 west of Scott Air Force Base. East of Belleville, it becomes a rural, two-lane surface road. Inside the Centralia city limits, Illinois 161 is coupled into eastbound Noleman Street and westbound McCord Street at Schwartz Road.

== History ==
SBI Route 161 originally ran from Belleville to Carlyle; in 1941 it was rerouted from Carlyle to IL 37 at its current eastern end, replacing IL 182. In 1964 it was extended west to Fairview Heights.

== Major intersections ==
County	Location	mi	km	Destinations	Notes
St. Clair	Fairview Heights	0.0	0.0	IL 157 – Centreville, Caseyville	Western terminus of IL 161
St. Clair	Swansea	6.5	10.5	IL 159 (Illinois Street) – Fairview Heights, Belleville	
St. Clair		12.2	19.6	IL 158 east (Air Mobility Drive)	West end of IL 158 concurrency
St. Clair		13.2	21.2	IL 158 west – Columbia	East end of IL 158 concurrency
St. Clair	Mascoutah	17.6	28.3	IL 4 – Lebanon, Mascoutah	
St. Clair	New Baden	21.8	35.1	I-64 – East St. Louis, Mt. Vernon	I-64 exit 27
Clinton	New Baden	24.0	38.6	IL 160 – Trenton	
Clinton		43.0	69.2	IL 127 – Carlyle, Nashville	
Marion	Centralia	55.0	88.5	US 51 south (Poplar Street) – Du Quoin	One-way pair
Marion	Centralia	55.1	88.7	US 51 north (Elm Street) – Vandalia	One-way pair
Marion		66.0	106.2	I-57 – Effingham, Mt. Vernon	I-57 exit 109
Marion		67.24	108.21	IL 37	Eastern terminus of IL 161
1.000 mi = 1.609 km; 1.000 km = 0.621 mi: Concurrency terminus
