= Illinois Route 163 =

State highway in St. Clair County, Illinois, US

Illinois Route 163
- IL 163 highlighted in red

Route information
- Maintained by IDOT
- Length: 9.89 mi (15.92 km)
- Existed: 1954–present

Major junctions
- South end: IL 158 in Millstadt
- North end: IL 15 in Alorton

Location
- Country: United States
- State: Illinois
- Counties: St. Clair

Highway system
- Illinois State Highway System; Interstate; US; State; Tollways; Scenic
← IL 162	→ IL 164

Illinois Route 163 (IL 163) is a 9.89-mile-long (15.92 km) north–south highway in southwestern Illinois. It runs from IL 158 in Millstadt north to IL 15 in Alorton; the route is located entirely within St. Clair County. IL 163 is maintained by the Illinois Department of Transportation.

== Route description ==
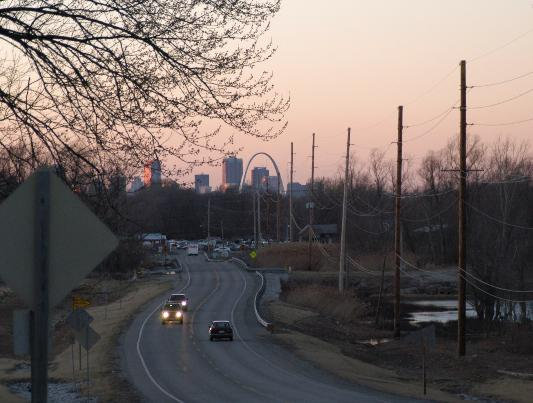
St. Louis skyline and Route 163, north of Millstadt

Illinois 163 begins at a junction with Illinois 158 in downtown Millstadt. The highway leaves the village to the north, entering rural Millstadt Township. After passing St. James Catholic Cemetery, it crosses into Stookey Township. The route then curves north-northwest past Concordia Church and Cemetery. Upon crossing Prairie Dupont Creek, it turns north through the community of Westview. At Booker T. Washington Cemetery, the route heads northwest into Centreville Township, where it meets Illinois 157. The highways run northward concurrently and enter Centreville before intersecting Illinois 13. At this junction, Illinois 157 follows Illinois 13 eastward, while Illinois 163 continues northward through a primarily residential area. The highway turns northeast into Alorton and passes under an overpass carrying Interstate 255 and U.S. Route 50, which do not meet Illinois 163. From here Illinois 163 runs parallel to the south of Illinois 15 before terminating at an intersection with this route. Illinois 163 is a two-lane road for its entire length.

== History ==
SBI Route 163 originally ran from Illinois Route 1 to Palestine. In 1937, this route became part of Illinois Route 33 (which turns south at Palestine). It was moved to its current alignment in 1954. From 1954-1957, it was also signed Bypass U.S. Route 50.

== Major intersections ==
The entire route is in St. Clair County.

Location	mi	km	Destinations	Notes
Millstadt	0.0	0.0	IL 158	Southern terminus
Centreville Township	7.0	11.3	IL 157	South end of concurrency with IL 157
Centreville	7.5	12.1	IL 13 / IL 157	North end of concurrency with IL 157
Alorton	9.9	15.9	IL 15	Northern terminus
1.000 mi = 1.609 km; 1.000 km = 0.621 mi: Concurrency terminus
