= Illinois Route 158 =

State highway in southwestern Illinois, US

Illinois Route 158
- IL 158 highlighted in red

Route information
- Maintained by IDOT
- Length: 25.81 mi (41.54 km)
- Existed: 1926–present

Major junctions
- West end: IL 3 in Columbia
- East end: I-64 / US 50 in O'Fallon

Location
- Country: United States
- State: Illinois
- Counties: Monroe, St. Clair

Highway system
- Illinois State Highway System; Interstate; US; State; Tollways; Scenic
← IL 157	→ IL 159

Illinois Route 158 is an east–west state road in southwestern Illinois. Its western terminus is at Illinois Route 3 in Columbia and its eastern terminus is at U.S. Route 50, in O'Fallon. This is a distance of 25.81 miles (41.54 km).

== Route description ==
Illinois 158 is an important east–west highway in the southeastern portions of the metropolitan St. Louis, Missouri area. It runs from Columbia through Millstadt, Belleville, and near the Scott Air Force Base. Portions of the route run north–south geographically.

IL 158 has a wrong-way concurrency with IL 161 near Scott Air Force Base, where you are going east on 158 and west on 161 at the same time. IDOT has used "North" and "South" cardinal direction banners for IL 158 for that concurrency in an attempt to remove confusion in that area. For the rest of the route, it is signed "East" and "West".

The eastern terminus is actually the intersection with US 50 just north of I-64. The road extends past the point as "Scott-Troy Road".

== History ==
SBI Route 158 ran from Columbia to Belleville on the current Illinois 158 routing. In 1957, it was extended north to O'Fallon, and west to the Jefferson Barracks Bridge; in 1958, Illinois 158 replaced Illinois Route 157 on the bridge approached. In 1960, the western end was brought back to Columbia.

== Future ==
The Illinois Department of Transportation has included a large portion of Illinois 158 in their Gateway Connector project; a southeastern beltway that would run from Columbia east to Scott Air Force Base, and north to Troy.

Illinois 158 will be a proposed 4-laned expressway all throughout its proposed route, however, some interchanges will have ramps and some may have traffic lights. This project has drawn much criticism from local residents of these areas. At least one organization, the Stop 158 group, has formed to block construction of the road and refocus use of taxpayer's dollars on a new Mississippi River bridge south of St. Louis.

The Gateway Connector remains unfunded for construction through 2010.

== Junction list ==
County	Location	mi	km	Destinations	Notes
Monroe	Columbia	0.0	0.0	IL 3 – Columbia, Waterloo	Interchange
St. Clair	Millstadt	5.6	9.0	IL 163 north (Jefferson Street) – Centreville	
St. Clair	Belleville	11.7	18.8	IL 15 – East St. Louis, Freeburg	Interchange
St. Clair	Belleville	11.8	19.0	IL 13 west (South Belt West) – East St. Louis	West end of IL 13 concurrency
St. Clair	Belleville	12.6	20.3	IL 159 (Illinois Street) – Belleville, Smithton	
St. Clair	Belleville	13.0	20.9	IL 13 east (Freeburg Avenue) – Freeburg	East end of IL 13 concurrency; west end of IL 177 concurrency
St. Clair		19.2	30.9	IL 177 east (Mascoutah Avenue) – Mascoutah	East end of IL 177 concurrency
St. Clair		20.2	32.5	IL 161 east (Scott Drive) – Scott AFB	East end of IL 161 concurrency
St. Clair		21.3	34.3	IL 161 west (Carlyle Avenue) – Belleville	West end of IL 161 concurrency
St. Clair	O'Fallon	25.0	40.2	I-64 / US 50 west – East St. Louis, Mt. Vernon	Interchange; west end of US 50 concurrency
St. Clair	O'Fallon	25.81	41.54	US 50 east / Old Highway 50 – Lebanon	East end of US 50 concurrency
St. Clair	O'Fallon			Scott-Troy Road	Continuation past US 50
1.000 mi = 1.609 km; 1.000 km = 0.621 mi: Concurrency terminus
