= Illinois Route 159 =

State highway in southwestern Illinois, US

Illinois Route 159
- IL 159 highlighted in red

Route information
- Maintained by IDOT
- Length: 64.90 mi (104.45 km)
- Existed: 1926–present

Major junctions
- South end: IL 3 / IL 154 in Red Bud
- I-64 / US 50 in Fairview Heights; I-55 / I-70 / US 40 in Collinsville; I-270 in Glen Carbon
- North end: IL 16 in Royal Lakes

Location
- Country: United States
- State: Illinois
- Counties: Randolph, Monroe, St. Clair, Madison, Macoupin

Highway system
- Illinois State Highway System; Interstate; US; State; Tollways; Scenic
← IL 158	→ IL 160
← IL 111	→ IL 113

Illinois Route 159 is a north–south state route in southwestern Illinois. Its southern terminus is at Illinois Route 3 and Illinois Route 154 in Red Bud and its northern terminus at Illinois Route 16 in Royal Lakes. This is a distance of 64.90 miles (104.45 km).

== Route description ==
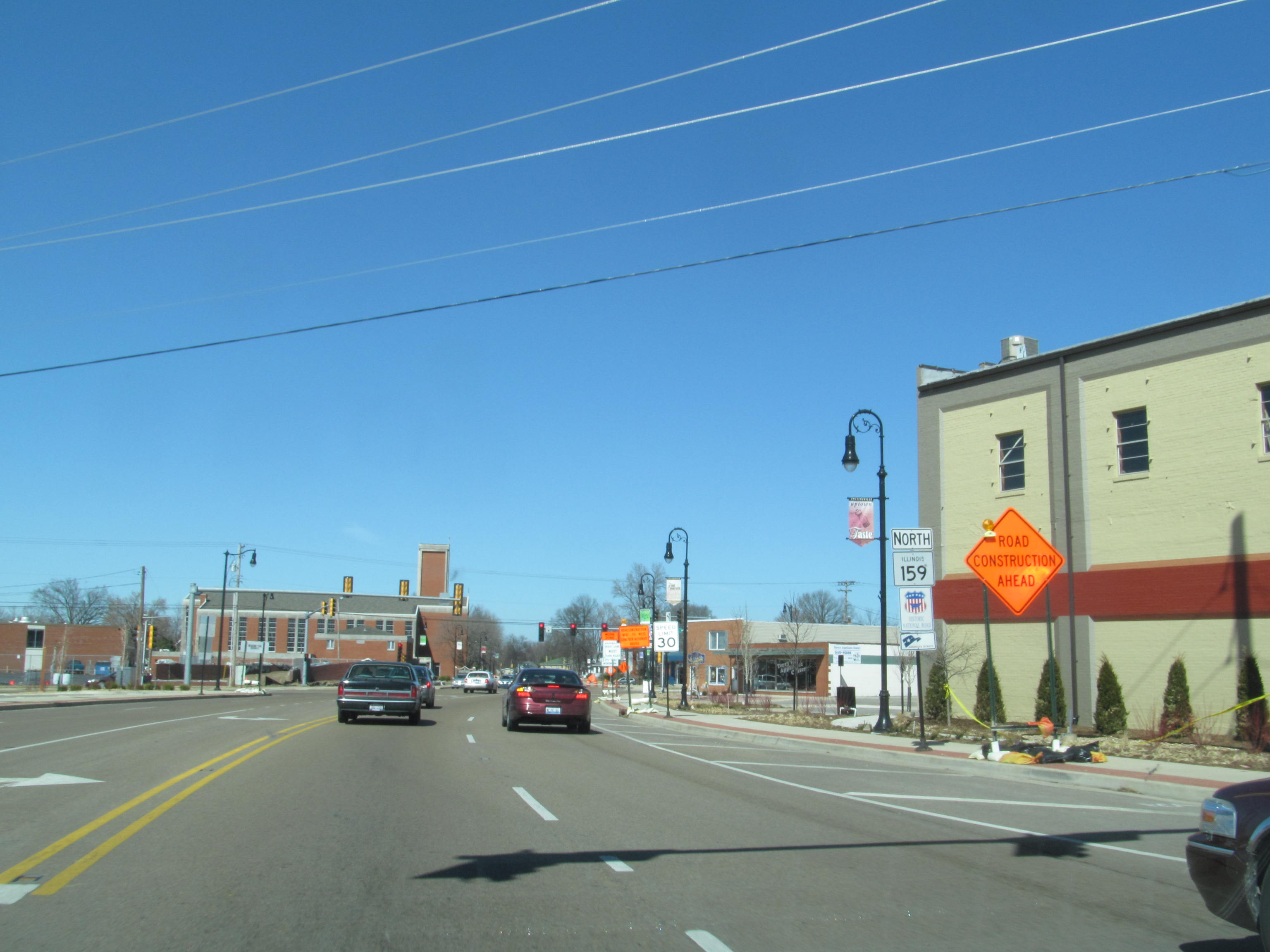
IL 159

Illinois 159 is a major north–south artery through the eastern portion of the metropolitan St. Louis, Missouri area. Illinois 159 overlaps Illinois Route 143 in Edwardsville.

The roadway from just north of the Public Square in Belleville to I-64 in Fairview Heights was widened to five lanes at some point in the second half of the 20th century. Widening of the stretch of Illinois 159 from just north of the interchange with I-64 in Fairview Heights to Edwardsville to five lanes took place around 2006, with the exception of downtown Collinsville, where a similar widening project was completed in 2012.

== History ==
SBI Route 159 ran from Red Bud to Alton. In 1964, the Edwardsville to Alton segment was changed to Illinois Route 143, and Illinois 159 was run north through Edwardsville to Royal Lakes, replacing Illinois Route 112. This created an unusual 3 way multiplex in downtown Edwardsville where you went north on 157, south on 159, and east on 143 for 2 blocks. This multiplex was not signed, however. In 2003 Illinois 159 was rerouted through Edwardsville, which eliminated that multiplex.

An Alternate Illinois Route 159 was proposed by Edwardsville on the old Illinois 159 alignment on Troy Road, but was never implemented.

== Major intersections ==
County	Location	mi	km	Destinations	Notes
Randolph	Red Bud	0.0	0.0	IL 3 / IL 154 / Great River Road (Market Street, Main Street)	
Monroe	Hecker	6.6	10.6	IL 156 west (Monroe Street)	South end of IL 156 overlap
St. Clair		7.8	12.6	IL 156 east	North end of IL 156 overlap
St. Clair	Belleville	20.2	32.5	IL 15 – East St. Louis, Mt. Vernon	
St. Clair	Belleville	20.5	33.0	IL 13 / IL 158 (South Belt)	
St. Clair	Swansea	22.7	36.5	IL 161 (North Belt)	
St. Clair	Fairview Heights	27.2	43.8	I-64 (US 50) – Mt. Vernon, St. Louis	exit 12 on I-64
Madison	Collinsville	35.3	56.8	I-55 / I-70 (US 40) – Chicago, St. Louis	exit 15 on I-55/70
Madison	Maryville	37.4	60.2	IL 162	
Madison	Glen Carbon	38.6	62.1	I-270 – Effingham, St. Charles	exit 12 on I-270
Madison	Edwardsville	42.6	68.6	IL 143 east / IL 157 (Vandalia Street)	South end of IL 143 overlap
Madison	Edwardsville	43.9	70.7	IL 143 west (Edwardsville Road)	North end of IL 143 overlap
Madison		49.3	79.3	IL 140	
Macoupin		61.7	99.3	IL 138 east	
Macoupin	Royal Lakes	64.9	104.4	IL 16	
1.000 mi = 1.609 km; 1.000 km = 0.621 mi
