= Illinois Route 15 =

State highway in southern Illinois, US

Illinois Route 15
- IL 15 highlighted in red

Route information
- Maintained by IDOT
- Length: 149.64 mi (240.82 km)
- Existed: November 5, 1918–present

Major junctions
- West end: I-55 / I-64 / US 40 / IL 3 in East St. Louis
- I-255 / US 50 in East St. Louis; US 51 in Ashley; I-57 / I-64 in Mt. Vernon; US 45 in Fairfield; IL 1 in Mt. Carmel
- East end: SR 64 in Mt. Carmel

Location
- Country: United States
- State: Illinois
- Counties: St. Clair, Washington, Jefferson, Wayne, Edwards, Wabash

Highway system
- Illinois State Highway System; Interstate; US; State; Tollways; Scenic
← IL 14	→ IL 16

Illinois Route 15 (IL 15) is a 149.64-mile-long (240.82 km) east–west highway in southern Illinois with its western terminus at Illinois Route 3, U.S. Route 40, I-55, and I-64, and its eastern terminus at Wabash River at the Illinois/Indiana Border where it meets State Road 64.

== History ==
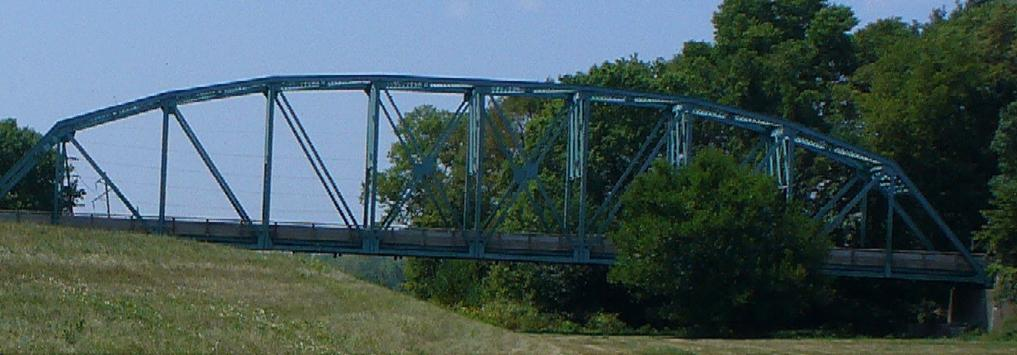
A 2007 picture of the old Wabash River bridge serving IL 14/IN 64. It had since been replaced by a new beam bridge.

West of Mt. Vernon, IL 15 was part of US 460. Until the 1960s, IL 15 went on the IL 160 corridor from Addieville to Okawville, then west on the present IL 177 corridor to Belleville. The section from Nashville to St. Libory was once IL 110, but this was back in the 1940s before US 460 was signed.

The current route was determined in 1967. US 460 was truncated in 1974.

In 2011, the old Parker truss bridge crossing the Wabash River was replaced by a beam bridge.

== Major intersections ==
County	Location	mi	km	Destinations	Notes
St. Clair	East St. Louis	0.0	0.0	I-55 south / I-64 west / US 40 west / IL 3 south / Tudor Avenue – St. Louis, Cahokia	
St. Clair	East St. Louis			Historic National Road west (Riverpark Drive) – Eads Bridge	west end of National Road overlap
St. Clair	East St. Louis			Historic National Road east (10th Street)	east end of National Road overlap
St. Clair	Alorton	3.4	5.5	IL 163 south – Alorton, Centreville, Millstadt	Northern terminus of IL 163
St. Clair	Alorton	4.2	6.8	I-255 / US 50 – Memphis, Chicago	I-255 exit 17
St. Clair	Alorton–Centreville line	5.6	9.0	IL 157 (Bluff Road) – Cahokia	interchange
St. Clair	Belleville	7.7	12.4	IL 13 (North Belt) – Belleville, Centreville	interchange; no access from IL 15 east to IL 13 west or IL 13 east to IL 15 west
St. Clair	Belleville			Frank Scott Parkway West	interchange
St. Clair	Belleville	12.1	19.5	IL 158 (Centerville Avenue) – Millstadt	interchange
St. Clair	Belleville	13.2	21.2	IL 159 (Illinois Street) – Red Bud	interchange
St. Clair	Belleville	14.6	23.5	IL 13 west – Belleville	interchange; western end of IL 13 concurrency; westbound exit and eastbound entrance
St. Clair	Freeburg	21.0	33.8	IL 13 east – Pinckneyville	Eastern end of IL 13 concurrency
St. Clair	Fayetteville	28.0	45.1	IL 4 north – Mascoutah, Lebanon	Western end of IL 4 concurrency
St. Clair	St. Libory	32.6	52.5	IL 4 south – Marissa	Eastern end of IL 4 concurrency
Washington	Johannisburg Township	38.7	62.3	IL 153 south – Coulterville	Northern terminus of IL 153
Washington	Plum Hill Township	45.5	73.2	IL 160 north – Addieville	Southern terminus of IL 160
Washington	Nashville	51.5	82.9	IL 127 (Mill Street) – Carlyle, Pinckneyville, Washington County State Lake	
Washington	Ashley Township	60.1	96.7	US 51 south – Carbondale	Western end of US 51 concurrency
Washington	Ashley Township	62.9	101.2	US 51 north – Centralia	Eastern end of US 51 concurrency
Jefferson	Mt. Vernon	75.7	121.8	I-57 / I-64 – Effingham, East St. Louis, Cairo, Evansville	I-57 exit 95
Jefferson	Mt. Vernon	78.3	126.0	IL 37 (10th Street) – Salem, Benton	
Wayne	Wayne City	95.8	154.2	IL 242 south – McLeansboro	Northern terminus of IL 242
Wayne	Fairfield	107	172	US 45 north – Flora	Western end of US 45 concurrency
Wayne	Fairfield	110	180	US 45 south (1st Street) to I-64 – Enfield	Eastern end of US 45 concurrency
Edwards	Albion	126	203	IL 130 south – Grayville	west end of IL 130 concurrency
Edwards	Albion	127	204	IL 130 north – Olney	east end of IL 130 concurrency
Wabash	Mt. Carmel	148	238	IL 1 north – Lawrenceville	west end of IL 1 concurrency
Wabash	Mt. Carmel	149	240	IL 1 south (3rd Street) – Grayville	east end of IL 1 concurrency
Wabash	Mt. Carmel	149.64	240.82	SR 64 east – Princeton	Indiana state line (Mount Carmel Bridge over the Wabash River)
1.000 mi = 1.609 km; 1.000 km = 0.621 mi: Concurrency terminus; Incomplete access
