= Interstate 64 in Illinois =

Section of Interstate Highway in Illinois

Interstate 64
- I-64 highlighted in red

Route information
- Maintained by IDOT
- Length: 130.4 mi (209.9 km)
- Existed: 1956–present
- NHS: Entire route

Major junctions
- West end: I-55 / I-64 / US 40 at the Missouri state line in East St. Louis
- I-55 / I-70 / US 40 / IL 3 in East St. Louis; I-255 / US 50 in Washington Park; US 50 / IL 158 in O'Fallon; US 51 near Richview; I-57 in Mt. Vernon; US 45 north of Mill Shoals; IL 1 in Grayville
- East end: I-64 at Indiana state line near Grayville

Location
- Country: United States
- State: Illinois
- Counties: St. Clair, Clinton, Washington, Jefferson, Wayne, White

Highway system
- Interstate Highway System; Main; Auxiliary; Suffixed; Business; Future; Illinois State Highway System; Interstate; US; State; Tollways; Scenic
← IL 63	→ IL 64

Interstate 64 (I-64) in the US state of Illinois is a major east–west Interstate Highway that runs through southern Illinois from the St. Louis metropolitan area east to the Indiana state line near Grayville, Illinois. It travels a distance of 130.4 miles (209.9 km).

== Route description ==
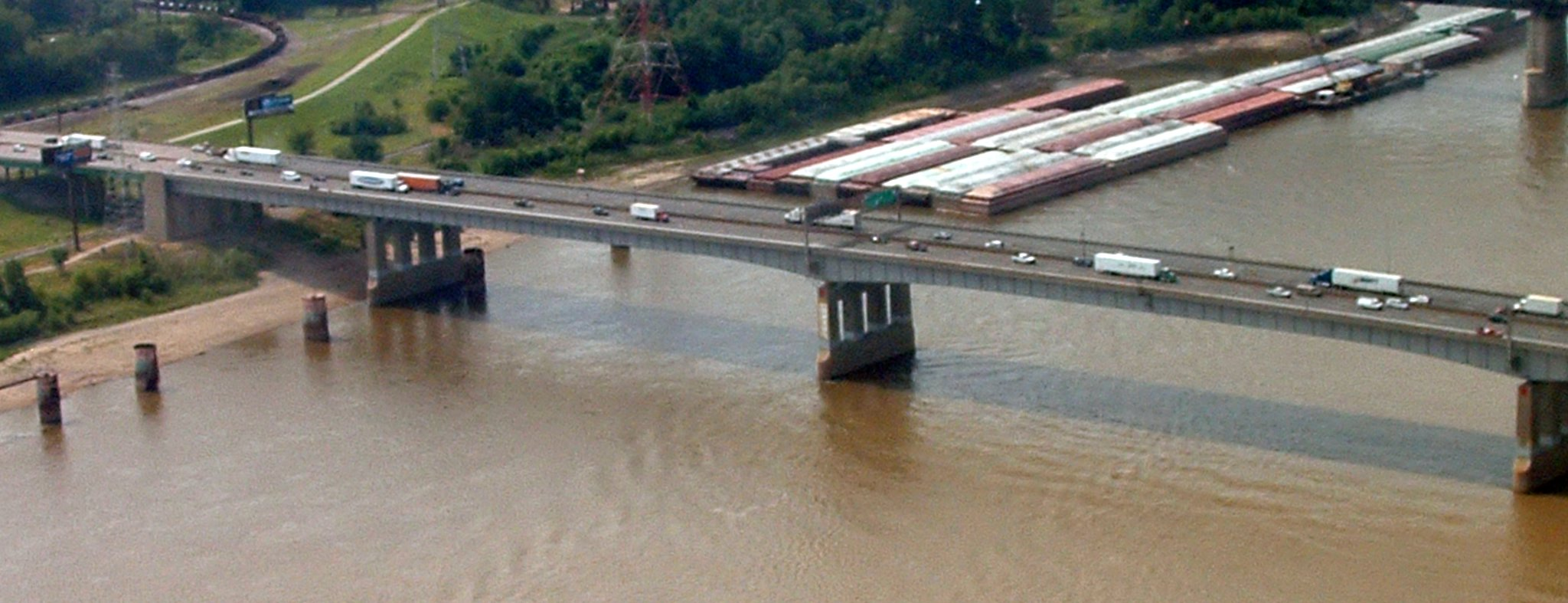
Poplar Street Bridge over the Mississippi River

I-64 enters Illinois running concurrently with I–55 and U.S. Route 40 (US 40) over the Mississippi River on the Poplar Street Bridge. After splitting from these highways in East St. Louis, I-64 turns southeasterly and proceeds through St. Clair County towards the Belleville area traveling through the eastern/southeastern St. Louis suburbs of Caseyville, Fairview Heights, O'Fallon, and Shiloh. In Shiloh, the Interstate skirts the northern edge of Scott Air Force Base and MidAmerica St. Louis Airport and provides access to Mascoutah and Lebanon via Illinois Route 4 (IL 4). A new interchange at Rieder Road was completed in September 2017 to create better access to Scott Air Force Base. As part of the new interchange, a third lane in each direction, a wide left shoulder to accommodate a future fourth lane in each direction, and a center Jersey barrier was added from one mile (1.6 km) west of Air Mobility Drive/IL 158 to Rieder Road.

At the St. Clair–Clinton county line, the Interstate passes the exurb of New Baden, after which it crosses the southern boundary of Clinton County and leaves the St. Louis metropolitan area. It then traverses a rural part of Illinois through Washington and Jefferson counties, which has no adjacent cities or major intersections passing; it reaches the city of Mount Vernon in Jefferson County, where it has a short concurrency with I-57. Mount Vernon is the only major city and intersection served by I-64 in Illinois outside of the St. Louis metropolitan area. Past Mount Vernon, the Interstate enters another rural stretch through parts of Jefferson, Wayne, and White counties before crossing the Wabash River into Indiana.

== History ==
Starting in 1970, a small portion of I-64 opened just west of the Indiana state line. In 1973, another small portion opened just south of Mount Vernon. By 1975, two portions of I-64 (from IL 4 to I-57 and IL 111 to IL 159) opened. By 1977, the rest of the route opened. As a result of the completion, US 460 was completely removed from Illinois.

== Exit list ==
County	Location	mi	km	Exit	Destinations	Notes
Mississippi River		0.0	0.0		I-55 south / I-64 west / US 40 west – St. Louis	Continuation into Missouri
Mississippi River		0.0	0.0	Poplar Street Bridge; Illinois–Missouri line		
St. Clair	East St. Louis	0.6	0.97	1	IL 3 south / Great River Road – Cahokia	Western end of IL 3/GRR concurrency; exit includes direct exit ramp onto 13th Street / Tudor Avenue
St. Clair	East St. Louis	0.9	1.4	2A	Third Street – Eads Bridge, Casino Queen	Westbound exit and eastbound entrance
St. Clair	East St. Louis	1.3	2.1	2B-C	Martin Luther King Bridge – Downtown St. Louis	Signed as exits 2B (left exit) and 2C (right exit); no eastbound exits
St. Clair	East St. Louis	2.5	4.0	3A	I-55 / Great River Road north / US 40 east to I-70 east – Chicago, Indianapolis	Eastern end of I-55/US 40/GRR concurrency; exit unnumbered eastbound; I-55 north exit 3, south exit 3A
St. Clair	East St. Louis	2.6	4.2	3B	I-70 west (Dwight D. Eisenhower Highway) to IL 3 north – Kansas City	Westbound exit and eastbound entrance; I-70 exit 3
St. Clair	East St. Louis	2.7	4.3	3	IL 3 north (St. Clair Avenue)	Eastern end of IL 3 concurrency; no westbound exit
St. Clair	East St. Louis	3.3	5.3	4A	Baugh Avenue / 18th Street	Westbound exit and entrance
St. Clair	East St. Louis	4.2	6.8	4B	25th Street	
St. Clair	Washington Park	5.8	9.3	6	IL 111 (Kingshighway)	
St. Clair	Caseyville	7.1	11.4	7	I-255 / US 50 west – Memphis, Chicago	Western end of US 50 concurrency; I-255 exit 20
St. Clair	Caseyville	8.4	13.5	9	IL 157 (Bluff Road) – Caseyville, Cahokia Heights	
St. Clair	Fairview Heights	12.0	19.3	12	IL 159 (Illinois Street) – Belleville, Collinsville	
St. Clair	O'Fallon	14.2	22.9	14	Old US Highway 50 – O'Fallon	
St. Clair	O'Fallon	15.7	25.3	16	Green Mount Road – O'Fallon, Shiloh	
St. Clair	O'Fallon	18.6	29.9	19	US 50 east / IL 158 west (Air Mobility Drive) – Carlyle, Scott Air Force Base	Eastern end of US 50 concurrency; northern terminus of IL 158; signed as exits 19A (west) and 19B (east)
St. Clair	O'Fallon			21	Rieder Road	Completed in 2017
St. Clair	Mascoutah	22.6	36.4	23	IL 4 – Mascoutah, Lebanon	Serves MidAmerica St. Louis Airport
St. Clair	New Baden	27.1	43.6	27	IL 161 – New Baden	
Clinton	Looking Glass Township	34.2	55.0	34	Albers	
Washington	Okawville Township	40.4	65.0	41	IL 177 – Okawville	
Washington	Nashville	49.8	80.1	50	IL 127 – Carlyle, Nashville	
Washington	Richview Township	60.7	97.7	61	US 51 – Centralia, Ashley	
Jefferson	Casner–Shiloh township line	68.6	110.4	69	Woodlawn	
Jefferson	Mount Vernon	73.3	118.0	73	I-57 north – Chicago	Western end of I-57 concurrency, exit 96 on I-57
Jefferson	Mount Vernon	74.8	120.4	95	IL 15 – Mount Vernon, Ashley	Exit numbers follow I-57; serves Mount Vernon Outland Airport
Jefferson	Mount Vernon	75.8	122.0	94	Veterans Memorial Drive	
Jefferson	McClellan Township	78.0	125.5	78	I-57 south to I-24 – Memphis, Nashville	Eastern end of I-57 concurrency; exit 92 on I-57. Access to Rend Lake
Jefferson	Dodds Township	79.7	128.3	80	IL 37 – Mount Vernon	
Jefferson	Pendleton Township	88.5	142.4	89	Belle Rive, Bluford	
Wayne	Orel Township	99.3	159.8	100	IL 242 – Wayne City	
Wayne	Barnhill Township	110.1	177.2	110	US 45 – Mill Shoals	
White	Burnt Prairie Township	116.7	187.8	117	CR 20 – Burnt Prairie	
White	Grayville	129.4	208.2	130	IL 1 – Grayville, Carmi	
Wabash River		130.4	209.9		I-64 east – Evansville, Louisville	Continuation into Indiana
1.000 mi = 1.609 km; 1.000 km = 0.621 mi: Concurrency terminus; Incomplete access

Interstate 64
Previous state: Missouri	Illinois	Next state: Indiana
