= Illinois Route 162 =

State highway in Madison County, Illinois, US

Illinois Route 162
- IL 162 highlighted in red

Route information
- Maintained by IDOT
- Length: 16.36 mi (26.33 km)
- Existed: 1954–present

Major junctions
- West end: IL 203 in Granite City
- I-255 in Pontoon Beach; I-55 / I-70 in Troy
- East end: US 40 in Troy

Location
- Country: United States
- State: Illinois
- Counties: Madison

Highway system
- Illinois State Highway System; Interstate; US; State; Tollways; Scenic
← IL 161	→ IL 163

Illinois Route 162 (IL 162) is a 16.36-mile-long (26.33 km) east–west highway in the southwestern part of the U.S. state of Illinois. It travels from IL 203 in Granite City east to U.S. Route 40 (US 40) near Troy.

== Route description ==
IL 162 has two lanes except around the Granite City Steel area and at I-55/I-70 and eastward into Troy. It is a main east–west artery between I-55 on the south, and I-270 on the north.

The Illinois Department of Transportation is doing major work on IL 162 at the interchange with I-55/I-70 in Troy. The bridge that carries IL 162 over I-55/I-70 has been the site of several accidents since it was built. The current project is expected to complete by Summer 2012.

== History ==
State Bond Issue (SBI) Route 162 originally traveled from Spring Valley to LaMoille. In 1938, this was changed to IL 89. In 1954, IL 162 was used on the Glen Carbon-to-Granite City portion of the current road. In 1965, it was extended east to Troy on what was US 40 Bypass.

== Major intersections ==
The entire route is in Madison County.

Location	mi	km	Destinations	Notes
Granite City	0.0	0.0	IL 203 (Nameoki Road)	Western terminus of IL 162
Pontoon Beach	3.2	5.1	IL 111 – Roxana, Fairmont City	
Pontoon Beach	5.1	8.2	I-255 – Memphis, To I-270	I-255 exit 29
Glen Carbon	7.2	11.6	IL 157 north (Bluff Road) – Edwardsville	West end of IL 157 concurrency
Glen Carbon	7.3	11.7	IL 157 south (Bluff Road) – Collinsville	East end of IL 157 concurrency
Maryville	9.7	15.6	IL 159 (Center Street) – Edwardsville, Collinsville	
Troy	12.2	19.6	I-55 / I-70 – Chicago, Indianapolis, East St. Louis	I-55 / I-70 exit 18
Troy	13.7	22.0	Historic National Road / Collinsville Road	West end of National Road overlap
Jarvis Township	16.36	26.33	US 40 / Historic National Road	Eastern terminus of IL 162; east end of National Road overlap
1.000 mi = 1.609 km; 1.000 km = 0.621 mi: Concurrency terminus
