= Illinois Route 4 =

North-south state highway in Illinois, US

Illinois Route 4
- IL 4 highlighted in red

Route information
- Maintained by IDOT
- Length: 170.44 mi (274.30 km)
- Existed: November 5, 1918–present

Major junctions
- South end: IL 13 / IL 127 in Vergennes
- I-64 in Lebanon; US 50 in Lebanon; US 40 in St. Jacob; I-70 in Marine; I-55 in Livingston; I-72 / US 36 in Springfield
- North end: I-55 BL / IL 29 in Springfield

Location
- Country: United States
- State: Illinois
- Counties: Jackson, Perry, Randolph, Washington, St. Clair, Madison, Macoupin, Sangamon

Highway system
- Illinois State Highway System; Interstate; US; State; Tollways; Scenic
← IL 3	→ IL 5

Illinois Route 4 is a major north–south highway that runs south from the Interstate 55 business loop around the state capital of Springfield, south to Illinois Route 13 just north of Murphysboro. This is a distance of 170.44 miles (274.30 km).

== Route description ==
Illinois Route 4 starts at Illinois 13 and Illinois 127 at a point about eight miles (13 km) north of Murphysboro. It zigzags through small southern towns such as Steeleville, Sparta, and Marissa, before straightening out near Mascoutah. IL Route 4 is an important road in St. Clair and Madison counties as it connects many suburbs and exurbs on the eastern edge of St. Louis, including Mascoutah, Lebanon, Troy, Highland, Edwardsville, Hamel, Staunton, Benld, and Gillespie. From Carlinville northwards the route is important since it connects many medium-sized rural towns and bedroom communities in Macoupin and Sangamon counties, such as Girard, Virden, Auburn, and Chatham, with Springfield. The road passes directly through Chatham, a fast-growing city that has transformed into a southern suburb and bedroom community for Springfield, which directly abuts the north edge of Chatham.

Within the City of Springfield, IL Route 4 is known as Veterans Parkway. It completes the western loop around the city, and is a divided four-lane highway that serves the major commercial area centered around the intersection of Veterans Parkway and Wabash Avenue, which includes White Oaks Mall.

It is also worth noting that the northbound lane of IL 4 is in Washington County for less than one mile (1.6 km), on its southwest corner near the unincorporated town of Clarmin where it runs concurrently with IL 13.

== History ==
Illinois State Bond Issue Route 4 was the first numbered through route between Chicago and St. Louis, as shown on the 1924 Illinois Road Map. As such it was the forerunner of more famous routes like US 66 and I-55.

In 1926, a new alignment for Route 4 was opened between Joliet and Lyons, on the north side of the Des Plaines River. The old alignment on the east and south sides of the curving river through Lemont was renamed Illinois Route 4A and then renamed again in 1967 as Illinois Route 171. Illinois Route 4A generally followed Archer Avenue from the Chicago city limits to Lemont.

When U.S. Route 66 was first designated in 1926, it coincided with IL 4 for its entire length; however, the earliest state map in 1927 erroneously showed Route 66 coinciding with IL 4A through the near Chicago suburbs instead of IL 4. Also, the section of IL 4 from just south of Staunton to Springfield was originally shown only as "Temporary U.S. Route 66," whereas the permanent routing of Route 66 was shown as proposed or under construction on a more eastern route, away from IL 4 through Litchfield. The new path of U.S. Route 66 was completed as SBI 16 and SBI 126 in 1930, and the Route 66 designation was then removed from IL 4 between Staunton and Springfield. Illinois Route 4 and U.S. Route 66 remained as coincident, co-signed routes between the Mississippi River and Staunton and between Springfield and Chicago until 1935, when the IL 4 designation was dropped from portions where it overlapped with Route 66, leaving only the portion from Staunton to Springfield as IL 4. This left IL 4A as an orphan alternate route of IL 4 from Lyons to Joliet, until it was renumbered as IL 171 in 1967.

The section of modern IL 4 from Staunton to its southern end near Murphysboro was originally IL 43. In 1964, IL 4 was extended on this highway, and the number IL 43 was eventually reused in the Chicago metro area to mark parts of Waukegan Road and Harlem Avenue.

== Historical designation ==
A bypassed portion of old route 4 north of Auburn is listed in the National Register of Historic Places as "Illinois Route 4-North of Auburn". It was added in 1998 as structure #98000979 and consists of two c.1920 bridges over Little Panther Creek and portions of Curran and Snell roads. One section is a c.1932 1.53 mile long brick road and the other is a c.1921 Portland cement road 16 feet (4.9 m) wide and 1,277 feet (389 m) long.

== Major intersections ==
County	Location	mi	km	Destinations	Notes
Jackson		0.0	0.0	IL 13 / IL 127 / Truax Traer Road – Pinckneyville, Murphysboro	
Jackson	Ava	10.8	17.4	IL 151 south (Keller Street) to IL 3 – Johnson Creek Recreation Area, Lake Kinkaid, Business District	
Perry–Randolph county line		21.7	34.9	IL 150 east – Cutler	south end of IL 150 overlap
Randolph		28.0	45.1	IL 150 west – Chester	north end of IL 150 overlap
Randolph	Sparta	35.7	57.5	IL 154 (Broadway Street) – Red Bud, Pinckneyville	
Randolph		41.8	67.3	IL 13 east (Butler Street) – Tilden, Pinckneyville	south end of IL 13 overlap
St. Clair	Marissa	45.3	72.9	IL 13 west (Lyons Street) – Belleville	north end of IL 13 overlap
St. Clair	St. Libory	53.7	86.4	IL 15 east (Church Street) – Mount Vernon	south end of IL 15 overlap
St. Clair	Fayetteville	58.3	93.8	IL 15 west (Main Avenue) – East St. Louis, Belleville	north end of IL 15 overlap
St. Clair	Mascoutah	66.2	106.5	IL 177 (Main Street)	
St. Clair	Mascoutah	68.7	110.6	IL 161 – Belleville, Centralia	
St. Clair	Mascoutah	70.7	113.8	I-64 – East St. Louis, Mount Vernon	I-64 exit 23
St. Clair	Lebanon	73.7	118.6	US 50 west – East St. Louis	south end of US 50 overlap
St. Clair	Lebanon	74.3	119.6	US 50 east – Carlyle, McKendree University, Arts Center	north end of US 50 overlap
Madison				Historic National Road east – St. Jacob	south end of National Road overlap; former US 40 east; state maintained
Madison		82.2	132.3	US 40 / Historic National Road west – East St. Louis, Highland	interchange; north end of National Road overlap
Madison		85.4	137.4	I-70 – East St. Louis, Effingham	I-70 exit 21
Madison		87.1	140.2	IL 143 – Edwardsville, Marine, Highland	
Madison		94.1	151.4	IL 140 – Alton, Greenville	
Madison		97.1	156.3	I-55 – East St. Louis, Springfield	I-55 exit 33
Madison		97.3	156.6	Historic US 66 west (Worden Road / Frontage Road) – Worden	south end of Historic US 66 overlap; state maintained
Madison				Livingston Drive - Livingston	state maintained
Madison		99.1	159.5	Historic US 66 east (Old Route 16) – Williamson	north end of Historic US 66 overlap; south end of Historic US 66 (1926-30) overlap; state maintained
Macoupin	Staunton			Main Street to I-55	state maintained (outside Staunton)
Macoupin	Benld	109.1	175.6	IL 138 east – Mount Olive, Business District	south end of IL 138 overlap
Macoupin	Benld	109.2	175.7	Historic US 66 (1926-30) east (North Hardroad)	north end of Historic US 66 (1926-30) overlap
Macoupin	Benld	109.7	176.5	IL 138 west / Historic US 66 (1926-30) west (North Hard Road) – Mount Clare, Wilsonville	north end of IL 138 overlap; south end of Historic US 66 (1926-30) overlap
Macoupin	Gillespie	112.0	180.2	IL 16 west – Jerseyville, Gillespie Lakes	south end of IL 16 overlap
Macoupin	Gillespie	112.5	181.1	IL 16 east – Litchfield	north end of IL 16 overlap
Macoupin	Carlinville	124.0	199.6	IL 108 east to I-55	south end of IL 108 overlap
Macoupin	Carlinville	124.7	200.7	IL 108 west – Carrollton, Beaver Dam State Park	north end of IL 108 overlap; traffic circle around town square
Sangamon	Auburn	149.5	240.6	IL 104 – Jacksonville, Taylorville	
Sangamon	Springfield	159.7	257.0	CR 23 / Historic US 66 (1926-30) east (Spaulding Orchard Road / Woodside Road)	north end of Historic US 66 (1926-30) overlap
Sangamon	Springfield	161.2	259.4	I-72 / US 36 to I-55 – Jacksonville, Decatur, Abraham Lincoln Presidential Library and Museum	I-72 exit 93
Sangamon	Springfield			Wabash Avenue - Robert Morris University	former US 36; state maintained
Sangamon		166.3	267.6	IL 97 (Jefferson Street) – Petersburg, Springfield	
Sangamon		168.7	271.5	IL 29 north (J. David Jones Parkway) – Mason City, Springfield, Airport, Illinois State Military Museum	south end of IL 29 overlap
Sangamon	Springfield	170.44	274.30	I-55 BL / IL 29 south / Historic US 66 (Peoria Road) – State Fairgrounds	north end of IL 29 overlap
1.000 mi = 1.609 km; 1.000 km = 0.621 mi
