= U.S. Route 51 in Illinois =

Section of U.S. Highway in Illinois, United States

U.S. Route 51
- US 51 highlighted in red, former alignment in blue

Route information
- Maintained by IDOT and ISTHA
- Length: 415.95 mi (669.41 km) Length may include both directions of route where it is routed along one-way streets.
- Existed: 1926–present

Major junctions
- South end: US 51 / US 60 / US 62 at the Kentucky state line in Cairo
- I-57 / IL 3 in Cairo; I-64 near Richview; I-70 in Vandalia; I-72 in Decatur; I-74 from southwest of Bloomington to northwest of Normal; I-55 from Bloomington to Normal; I-39 from Normal to South Beloit; I-80 in LaSalle; I-88 Toll / IL 110 (CKC) in Rochelle; I-90 Toll from Cherry Valley to South Beloit
- North end: US 51 at the Wisconsin state line in South Beloit

Location
- Country: United States
- State: Illinois
- Counties: Alexander, Pulaski, Union, Jackson, Perry, Washington, Jefferson, Marion, Fayette, Shelby, Christian, Macon, DeWitt, McLean, Woodford, Marshall, LaSalle, Lee, Ogle, Winnebago

Highway system
- United States Numbered Highway System; List; Special; Divided; Illinois State Highway System; Interstate; US; State; Tollways; Scenic
← IL 50	→ US 52

U.S. Route 51 (US 51) in the U.S. state of Illinois, is a main north–south artery that runs from the Ohio River north to the Wisconsin border, a distance of 415.95 miles (669.41 km).

== Route description ==
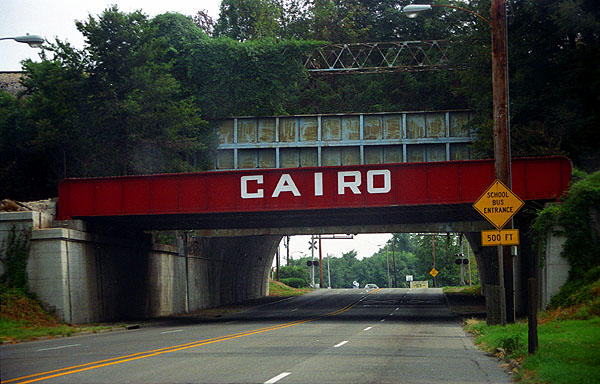
Southbound US 51 approaching Cairo

US 51 enters Illinois from Kentucky at Cairo, Illinois. The highway heads northbound to Mounds, near Cairo, and begins to overlap Interstate 57 (I-57), following it for 24 miles (39 km) to Dongola, before splitting and heading north. The highway remains two lanes wide from Dongola to Assumption with the exception of a 10-mile (16 km) section between Centralia and I-64.

Past Assumption, US 51 becomes an expressway to Decatur. In Decatur, US 51 follows I-72 to bypass the city. US 51 leaves I-72 after eight miles (13 km), and it heads north to Bloomington–Normal as an expressway. At Bloomington–Normal, US 51 follows I-74 for a mile, then I-55 for seven miles (11 km), before following I-39 for 140 miles (230 km).

US 51 follows I-39, intersecting I-80 and I-88 along the way. The highway also follows US 20 south of Rockford (while still following I-39). I-39/US-51 join I-90, making US 51 one of the few toll highways in Illinois that is a U.S. Highway. US 51 exits I-39/I-90 just a mile south of the Wisconsin state line. Then US 51 follows Illinois Route 75 (IL 75) west to the intersection of IL 251, and then turns north through South Beloit, Illinois to enter Wisconsin.

== History ==
US 51 was established in Illinois in the 1920s. Over the years, it became a heavily traveled highway, often experiencing many accidents, particularly in the northern half of the state. This highway gained the moniker of "Killer 51". As a result of these problems, Illinois pushed for a new four lane highway along the corridor. One was proposed in the 1960s and 1970s as part of a proposed supplemental freeway system, but only the area between Rockford and Decatur was given a high priority.

In the 1980s and early 1990s, US 51 was rebuilt to Interstate standards between Rockford and Bloomington–Normal on a new alignment. This new highway became Interstate 39, and US 51 was rerouted onto it. In addition, north of Rockford, US 51 was rerouted onto the existing I-90 segment between South Beloit and Cherry Valley. Most of the old highway became IL 251.

South of Bloomington–Normal to Decatur, US 51 remained largely on the original alignment, and it was expanded to an expressway. In the 2000s, the expressway was continued southward from Decatur to Assumption, Illinois.

== Major intersections ==
County	Location	mi	km	Exit	Destinations	Notes
Alexander	Cairo	0.0	0.0		US 51 south / US 60 east / US 62 east – Wickliffe	Continuation into Kentucky
Alexander	Cairo	0.2	0.32		US 60 west / US 62 west to I-57 south – Charleston	Northern end of US 60/US 62 concurrency
Alexander	Cairo	4.5	7.2		IL 37 north – Mound City IL 3 begins	Southern end of IL 3 concurrency; southern termini of IL 3 and IL 37
Alexander	Cairo	5.3	8.5	1	I-57 south / IL 3 north – Olive Branch, Sikeston, MO	Northern end of IL 3 concurrency; southern end of I-57 concurrency
Pulaski		11.4	18.3	8	Mounds Road	
Pulaski		21.4	34.4	18	Ullin Road	
Union	Dongola	28.2	45.4	24	Dongola Road	
Union	Dongola	28.8	46.3	25	I-57 north – Chicago	Northern end of I-57 concurrency; Northbound exit and southbound entrance
Union	Anna	36.0	57.9		IL 146 – Jonesboro, Vienna	
Jackson	Carbondale	55.0	88.5		IL 13 – Murphysboro, Marion	
Jackson	De Soto	61.3	98.7		IL 149 – Murphysboro, Hurst	
Perry	Du Quoin	72.4	116.5		IL 14 east – Christopher	Western terminus of IL 14
Perry	Du Quoin	75.5	121.5		IL 152 west – Pyatts	Eastern terminus of IL 152
Perry	Sunfield	80.4	129.4		IL 154 – Red Bud, Sesser	
Washington	Ashley	98.0	157.7		IL 15 west – East St. Louis	Western end of IL 15 concurrency
Washington	Ashley	100.9	162.4		IL 15 east – Mount Vernon	Eastern end of IL 15 concurrency
Washington	Richview	105.7	170.1		I-64 – Mount Vernon, East St. Louis	I-64 exit 61
Washington	Irvington	109.6	176.4		IL 177 west – Belleville	Western terminus of IL 177
Jefferson	No major junctions					
Marion	Centralia	116.2	187.0		IL 161 – New Baden, Kell	
Marion	Sandoval	122.7	197.5		US 50 west – Carlyle	Western end of US 50 concurrency
Marion	Sandoval	123.0	197.9		US 50 east – Salem	Eastern end of US 50 concurrency
Fayette	Vandalia	146.9	236.4		US 40 east / IL 185 east – Bluff City	Eastern end of US 40/IL 185 concurrency
Fayette	Vandalia	148.5	239.0		US 40 west / IL 185 west – Taylor Springs, Mulberry Grove	Western end of US 40/IL 185 concurrency
Fayette	Vandalia	148.7	239.3		I-70 – Effingham, St. Louis	Exit 63 on I-70
Shelby	No major junctions					
Christian	Pana	178.1	286.6		IL 16 west – Hillsboro	Western end of IL 16 concurrency
Christian	Pana	178.6	287.4		IL 29 north – Taylorville	Southern terminus of IL 29
Christian		180.2	290.0		IL 16 east – Shelbyville	Eastern end of IL 16 concurrency
Shelby	No major junctions					
Macon		207.3	333.6		Elwin, Mt Zion	Northbound exit, southbound entrance
Macon		210	340		Decatur, Elwin, Mt Zion	Interchange
Macon		211.2	339.9		IL 48 – Taylorville, Decatur	
Macon	Harristown	214.7	345.5	133	I-72 west / US 36 – Springfield, Decatur	Southern end of I-72 concurrency; signed as exits 133A (east) and 133B (south)
Macon	Decatur	219.2	352.8	138	IL 121 – Decatur, Lincoln	
Macon	Decatur	222.2	357.6	141	I-72 east – Champaign, Urbana, Decatur	Northern end of I-72 concurrency
DeWitt	Clinton	237.9	382.9		US 51 Bus. north – Clinton	
DeWitt	Clinton	239.5	385.4		IL 54 – Springfield, Clinton	
DeWitt	Clinton	240.0	386.2		IL 10 – Lincoln, Clinton	
DeWitt	Clinton	242.0	389.5		US 51 Bus. south – Clinton	
McLean	Heyworth	251.9	405.4		US 136 – McLean, Rantoul	
McLean		260.5	419.2	135	US 51 Bus. (Main Street) – Bloomington I-74 east – Champaign	Southern end of I-74 concurrency
McLean		262.2	422.0	157A	I-55 south – St. Louis, Springfield	Southern end of I-55 concurrency
McLean	Bloomington	262.4	422.3	157B	I-55 BL north (Veterans Parkway)	Signed as exit 134B (north) southbound
McLean	Bloomington	265.5	427.3	160	US 150 / IL 9 (Market Street) – Pekin	
McLean		269.1	433.1	163	I-74 west – Peoria	Northern end of I-74 concurrency; I-74 exit 127
McLean		270.3	435.0	—	I-55 north – Chicago I-39 begins	Northern end of I-55 concurrency; southern end of I-39 concurrency; southern terminus of I-39; I-55 exit 154
McLean		272.1	437.9	2	US 51 Bus. south – Bloomington, Normal	
McLean	Hudson	275.2	442.9	5	CR 12 (Franklin Street) – Hudson	
McLean		278.3	447.9	8	IL 251 north / CR 8 (Lake Bloomington Road) – Kappa	Southern terminus of IL 251
Woodford	El Paso	284.9	458.5	14	US 24 – El Paso, Peoria	
Woodford	Woodford	292.9	471.4	22	IL 116 – Peoria, Pontiac	
Woodford	Minonk	297.5	478.8	27	Minonk	
Marshall	Wenona	305.6	491.8	35	IL 17 – Lacon, Wenona	
LaSalle	Lostant	312.2	502.4	41	IL 18 – Henry, Streator	
LaSalle	Tonica	319.2	513.7	48	Tonica	
LaSalle		322.3	518.7	51	IL 71 – Hennepin, Oglesby	
LaSalle		323.0	519.8	52	IL 251 – Peru, LaSalle	
LaSalle	Oglesby	324.4	522.1	54	Oglesby	
LaSalle	Illinois River	326.5	525.5	Abraham Lincoln Memorial Bridge		
LaSalle	La Salle	327.3	526.7	57	US 6 – LaSalle, Peru, Ottawa	
LaSalle		329.6	530.4	59	I-80 – LaSalle, Peru, Chicago, Des Moines	Signed as exits 59A (east) and 59B (west); I-80 exit 79
LaSalle	Troy Grove	336.8	542.0	66	US 52 – Troy Grove	
LaSalle	Mendota	342.7	551.5	72	US 34 – Mendota, Earlville	
Lee	Paw Paw	353.1	568.3	82	Paw Paw	
Lee	Lee	357.9	576.0	87	US 30 – Sterling, Rock Falls, Aurora	
Lee	Steward	363.9	585.6	93	Steward	
Ogle	Rochelle	368.0	592.2	97	I-88 Toll / IL 110 (CKC) (Ronald Reagan Memorial Tollway) – Moline, Rock Island, Chicago	Signed as exits 97A (east) and 97B (west); I-88 exit 78
Ogle	Rochelle	370.1	595.6	99	IL 38 / Lincoln Highway – DeKalb, Rochelle	
Ogle	Lindenwood	375.1	603.7	104	IL 64 – Sycamore, Oregon	
Ogle	Monroe Center	381.6	614.1	111	IL 72 – Genoa, Byron	
Winnebago		386.1	621.4	115	Baxter Road	
Winnebago	Rockford	390.2	628.0	118-119	US 20 west (Rockford Bypass) – Freeport, Rockford	Southern end of US 20 concurrency
Winnebago	Cherry Valley	392.7	632.0	121	US 20 east (Harrison Avenue) – Belvidere	Northern end of US 20 concurrency; former cloverleaf interchange converted to diverging diamond interchange
Winnebago	Cherry Valley	393.4	633.1	122	I-90 Toll east (Jane Addams Memorial Tollway) – Chicago	Southern end of I-90 concurrency; I-39/US 51 uses I-90's exit numbers from here north; exit 17 on I-90
Winnebago	Rockford	395.1	635.9	15	US 20 Bus. (State Street)	Last free exit northbound
Winnebago	Rockford	398.4	641.2	12	Riverside Boulevard	Toll on northbound exit and southbound entrance
Winnebago	Machesney Park	401.9	646.8	9	IL 173 (West Lane Road) – Machesney Park	Toll on northbound exit and southbound entrance
Winnebago	Rockton	407.3	655.5	South Beloit Toll Plaza		
Winnebago	South Beloit	408.1	656.8	3	CR 9 (Rockton Road)	Last free exit southbound
Winnebago	South Beloit	414.0	666.3	1	I-39 north / I-90 west – Madison IL 75 east (Manchester Road)	Northern end of I-39/I-90 concurrency; southern end of IL 75 concurrency
Winnebago	South Beloit	415.6	668.8		IL 75 west (Gardner Street) / IL 251 south (North 2nd Street) – Freeport, Rockford	Northern end of IL 75 concurrency; northern terminus of IL 251
Winnebago	South Beloit	415.95	669.41		US 51 north (Dearborn Street) – Beloit	Continuation into Wisconsin
1.000 mi = 1.609 km; 1.000 km = 0.621 mi: Concurrency terminus; Incomplete access; Tolled

U.S. Route 51
Previous state: Kentucky	Illinois	Next state: Wisconsin
