= IL-4 =

IL4, Il-4, or IL-4 may refer to:

- Ilyushin Il-4, a Soviet World War II bomber
- Interleukin 4, a cytokine that stimulates the proliferation of activated B-cells
- Illinois's 4th congressional district
- Illinois Route 4
