= Illinois Route 3 =

State highway in southwestern Illinois, US

Illinois Route 3
- IL 3 highlighted in red

Route information
- Maintained by IDOT
- Length: 187.44 mi (301.66 km)
- Existed: November 5, 1918–present

Major junctions
- South end: US 51 / IL 37 in Cairo
- I-255 / US 50 from Columbia to Cahokia; I-55 / I-64 / US 40 in East St. Louis; I-55 / I-64 / I-70 / US 40 in East St. Louis; I-270 in Granite City; US 67 in Alton
- North end: IL 100 in Grafton

Location
- Country: United States
- State: Illinois
- Counties: Alexander, Union, Jackson, Randolph, Monroe, St. Clair, Madison, Jersey

Highway system
- Illinois State Highway System; Interstate; US; State; Tollways; Scenic
← IL 2	→ IL 4

Illinois Route 3 (IL 3) is a 187.44-mile-long (301.66 km) major north–south arterial state highway in southwestern Illinois. It has its southern terminus at Cairo Junction (about four miles (6.4 km) north of Cairo) at the intersection of U.S. Route 51 (US 51) and Illinois Route 37, and its northern terminus in Grafton at IL 100.

== Route description ==
The majority of IL 3 has four lanes from Waterloo to Godfrey, with brief six-lane stretches from the entrance to the McKinley Bridge in Venice to near the River's Edge area (formerly the Army Depot) in Granite City and near Alton Square Mall in Alton, as well as a brief two-laned section between its separation from I-55, I-64, and US 40 in East St. Louis and Venice. It is also two-laned the majority of the southern part from Waterloo to Cairo near areas of the Shawnee National Forest, as well as the northern portion from Godfrey to Grafton. It briefly overlaps IL 111 at Alton, I-255 and US 50, and IL 127 north of Cache.

IL 3 parallels the Mississippi River for the entire length of its journey, and it carries the Illinois portion of the Great River Road for most of its length. South of St. Louis, I-55 is its parallel on the west side of the river, along with US 61. The road runs along many historical sites along the Mississippi River, and is the closest Illinois state highway to the old state capital of Kaskaskia.

== History ==
=== Original 1918 route ===
The original IL 3 route went from Chester in southern Illinois to Morrison in northwest Illinois via Rock Island. With the completion of highway bridges over the Mississippi River (e.g. Clark Bridge at Alton) U.S. Route 67 (US 67) was extended from St. Louis to Godfrey and replaced the original IL 3 to Rock Island. Today, this route is still the major north–south corridor for western Illinois—and the only major Illinois north–south route never converted to the Interstate Highway System like I-57, I-55, or I-39.

=== Current route ===
On August 4, 1976, the new Berm Highway from Wood River to Alton was opened. It was signed as IL 3, which left the old alignment on Lewis and Clark Boulevard and Broadway unmarked. However, on June 29, 1987, the Illinois Department of Transportation (IDOT) built the new Madison Avenue extension in Wood River and marked that road and the Berm Highway as IL 143 and truncated IL 3 at IL 143 (highway signage and IDOT planning maps suggested otherwise, however). This new terminus for Route 3 was short-lived, however.

On November 26, 1987, a new section of Homer M. Adams Parkway in Alton opened to traffic, and IL 3 was extended onto Lewis and Clark Boulevard (a former IL 3 alignment) back into Alton and onto the extension. IL 3 was then cosigned with IL 111 until the intersection with Godfrey Road, where IL 3 takes over the former IL 100 alignment.

== Major intersections ==
County	Location	mi	km	Exit	Destinations	Notes
Alexander	Cairo	0.8	1.3		Great River Road / Lincoln Heritage Trail south / US 51 / I-57 – Sikeston Mo., Mount Vernon	IDOT signs this as southern terminus; southern end of Great River Road/Lincoln Heritage Trail overlap; I-57 exit 1; highway continues as US 51/GRR/LHT south
Alexander	Olive Branch				Horseshoe Lake Conservation Area, Miller City	
Alexander		8.5	13.7		IL 127 north – Jonesboro, Mounds	
Alexander	McClure	26.0	41.8		IL 146 west – Cape Girardeau	Southern end of IL 146 overlap
Union	Ware	37.7	60.7		IL 146 east / Lincoln Heritage Trail (Southern Branch) spur – Jonesboro, Lincoln-Douglas Debate Site	Northern end of IL 146 overlap
Jackson	Grand Tower	51.3	82.6		Great River Road Spur north (Grand Tower Road) – River Access, Devils Backbone Park, Business District	
Jackson		53.0	85.3		Great River Road Spur south (Power Plant Road) – River Access, Devils Backbone Park	
Jackson					Gorham Road - Gorham, Neunert, Jacob	State maintained
Jackson		60.6	97.5		IL 149 east – Murphysboro, Carbondale, Lake Murphysboro State Park	
Jackson		65.0	104.6		IL 151 north – Lake Kinkaid, Ava, Johnson Creek Recreational Area	
Randolph		80.6	129.7		Great River Road (National Route) north (Truck Bypass) – River Bridge	Northern end of Great River Road overlap; state maintained
Randolph	Chester	83.4	134.2		IL 150 west (State Street) – River Bridge, Penitentiary	Southern end of IL 150 overlap
Randolph	Chester	83.6	134.5		IL 150 east (State Street) – Steeleville	Northern end of IL 150 overlap
Randolph	Chester	83.9	135.0		Great River Road Spur begins / Jefferson Street	Southern end of Great River Road Spur overlap
Randolph	Chester	84.2	135.5		Great River Road Spur ends / Great River Road south (Truck Bypass) – River Bridge, Penitentiary	Northern end of Great River Road Spur overlap; southern end of Great River Road overlap
Randolph		89.8	144.5		Great River Road Spur (Shawneetown Trail) – Fort Kaskaskia Historic Site, Pierre Menard Home, Randolph County Conservation Area	State maintained to Fort Kaskaskia
Randolph					Roots Road - River Ferry, Modoc, Kaskaskia Lock and Dam, Fort de Chartres Historic Site	State maintained
Randolph	Ruma	103.1	165.9		IL 155 west / Lincoln Heritage Trail (Southern Branch) north / Great River Road Spur – Prairie du Rocher, Fort de Chartres Historic Site, River Ferry	Northern end of Lincoln Heritage Trail overlap
Randolph	Red Bud	108.6	174.8		IL 154 east (Market Street) / IL 159 north (Main Street) – Belleville, Sparta	
Monroe					Kaskaskia Road - Burksville, Renault, Illinois Caverns State Natural Area	
Monroe	Waterloo	122.2	196.7		IL 156 (Park Street) – Fairgrounds, Wartburg, Maeystown, Valmeyer	
Monroe	Columbia	129.5	208.4		IL 158 east – Belleville	Interchange
Monroe	Columbia	133.1	214.2	—	Quarry Road / Palmer Road	South end of freeway
Monroe	Columbia	134.3	216.1	—	I-255 south / US 50 west (J.B. Bridge) – St. Louis County, Memphis, Tulsa	Southern end of I-255/US 50 overlap; I-255 exit 6
St. Clair	Dupo	136.5	219.7	9	Dupo	Exit number follows I-255
St. Clair	Dupo	137.4	221.1	—	I-255 north / US 50 east – Chicago	North end of freeway; northern end of I-255/US 50 overlap; I-255 exit 10
St. Clair	Cahokia Heights	141.2	227.2		IL 157 north (Camp Jackson Road) – Nicholas Jarrot Mansion, Holy Family Church	
St. Clair	East St. Louis	144.2– 144.8	232.1– 233.0	—	I-55 south / I-64 west / US 40 west to I-70 west / I-44 – St. Louis	South end of freeway; I-55 north/I-64 east exit 1; former I-70 west
St. Clair	East St. Louis	144.2– 144.8	232.1– 233.0	—	13th Street / Tudor Avenue	No southbound entrance
St. Clair	East St. Louis	144.2– 144.8	232.1– 233.0	—	Barack Obama Avenue – East St. Louis, Business District, Casino Queen	Formerly Fourth Street; northbound exit and southbound entrance
St. Clair	East St. Louis	144.2– 144.8	232.1– 233.0	—	I-64 / US 40 west / I-55 south – St. Louis	South end of I-55/I-64/US 40 concurrency; southbound left exit and northbound left entrance; I-55 south/I-64 west exit 1; former I-70 west
St. Clair	East St. Louis	145.7	234.5	2A	Third Street – Eads Bridge, Casino Queen	Exit numbers follow I-55/I-64; southbound exit and northbound entrance
St. Clair	East St. Louis	146.0	235.0	2B-C	Martin Luther King Bridge – Downtown St. Louis	Signed as exits 2B (left exit) and 2C (right exit); no northbound exits
St. Clair	East St. Louis	146.2– 146.8	235.3– 236.3		I-55 / Great River Road north / I-70 / US 40 east – Chicago, Indianapolis I-64 east – Louisville	North end of freeway; northern end of I-55/I-64/US 40/Great River Road overlap; I-55 north exit 3, south exit 3A; I-64 exit 3; I-70 east exit 3
St. Clair	Fairmont City				Packers Avenue to I-55 north / I-64 east / I-70	Interchange via connector road; I-70 exit 2
Madison	Venice	151.1	243.2		McKinley Bridge – St. Louis	State maintained
Madison	Granite City	158.4	254.9		Historic US 66 east (Chain of Rocks Road)	Southern end of Historic US 66 overlap; state maintained
Madison	Granite City	158.6	255.2		I-270 / Great River Road south / Historic US 66 west – St. Charles, Effingham	Southern end of Great River Road overlap; I-270 exit 3; northern end of Historic US 66 overlap
Madison	Hartford	161.6	260.1		Meeting of the Great Rivers begins / Great River Road Spur (New Poag Road) – Lewis and Clark Historic Site, SIUE Campus	Southern end of Meeting of the Great Rivers overlap; New Poag Rd. south is former US 67 south
Madison	Hartford				Hawthorne Street – Hartford	State maintained
Madison	Wood River	165.6	266.5		Great River Road / Meeting of the Great Rivers north / IL 143 – Alton, Riverfront, Wood River, Business District	Northern end of Great River Road/Meeting of the Great Rivers overlap
Madison	Alton	169.3	272.5		IL 111 south / IL 140 (College Avenue) – Bethalto	Interchange; southern end of IL 111 overlap
Madison	Godfrey	173.0	278.4		IL 111 north (Godfrey Road) to US 67 / State Street – Clark Bridge, Lewis and Clark Community College, Jacksonville	Northern end of IL 111 overlap
Jersey		182.0	292.9		IL 109 north – Jerseyville	
Jersey	Grafton	190.0	305.8		IL 100 / Great River Road / Meeting of the Great Rivers	Northern terminus; road continues south as Market Street
1.000 mi = 1.609 km; 1.000 km = 0.621 mi: Concurrency terminus; Incomplete access
