= IL-15 =

IL-15 can refer to:

- Interleukin 15, a protein important in immunology
- Illinois's 15th congressional district
- Illinois Route 15
