= IL-12 =

IL-12 or IL 12 may refer to:

- Interleukin 12, a protein encoded in humans
- Ilyushin Il-12, a Soviet twin-engine airliner and military transport aircraft
- Illinois's 12th congressional district
- Illinois Route 12, a highway in Illinois, United States
