= Pontiac William Holliday School District 105 =

School district in Illinois, United States

Address
- 400 Ashland Avenue Fairview Heights, Illinois, 62208; United States

District information
- Type: Public
- Grades: PreK–8
- NCES District ID: 1732190

Students and staff
- Students: 657

Other information
- Website: www.pwh105.org

Pontiac-William Holliday School District 105 is a school district based in Fairview Heights, Illinois in the St. Louis Metropolitan Area. The district has two schools in Fairview Heights, William Holliday Elementary School and Pontiac Junior High School.
