= U.S. Route 50 in Illinois =

US Highway within the state of Illinois

U.S. Route 50
- US 50 highlighted in red

Route information
- Maintained by IDOT
- Length: 165.79 mi (266.81 km)
- Existed: 1926–present

Major junctions
- West end: I-255 / US 50 at the Missouri state line in Columbia
- I-64 / I-255 in Washington Park; I-64 / IL 158 in O'Fallon; US 51 in Sandoval; I-57 in Salem; US 45 in Flora; IL 1 in Lawrenceville
- East end: US 50 at the Indiana state line near Lawrenceville

Location
- Country: United States
- State: Illinois
- Counties: Monroe, St. Clair, Clinton, Marion, Clay, Richland, Lawrence

Highway system
- United States Numbered Highway System; List; Special; Divided; Illinois State Highway System; Interstate; US; State; Tollways; Scenic
| ← IL 49 | → IL 50 |
| ← US 12 | IL 12 | → IL 13 |

U.S. Route 50 (US 50) in the state of Illinois is an east–west highway across the southern portion of the state. It runs from the Jefferson Barracks Bridge, over the Mississippi River, to Missouri east, to the Red Skelton Memorial Bridge, over the Wabash River and to Indiana. This is a distance of 165.79 miles (266.81 km).

== Route description ==
US 50 runs east–west across the southern portion of the state, between Interstate 70 (I-70) to the north and I-64 to the south. Along many portions of US 50, the road has been moved onto either a bypass or an expressway.

=== Missouri state line to Flora ===
After US 50 and I-255 leave Mehlvile and enter Columbia, they then run concurrently with Illinois Route 3 (IL 3), as well as the Great River Road, at a directional T interchange (exit 6). At a trumpet interchange (exit 10), IL 3 and the Great River Road leave the freeway. Further northeast, they meet IL 157 at a parclo interchange with five ramps, Mousette Lane at a diamond interchange, IL 15 at a cloverleaf interchange, and State Street at a four-ramp parclo interchange. At the next interchange, US 50 moves off I-255 to I-64 at a cloverleaf interchange with collector–distributor lanes. Once US 50 moves onto I-64, it continues eastward. They meet IL 157 at a four-ramp parclo, IL 159 at a six-ramp parclo, and a few other interchanges before they reach another cloverleaf. At that point, US 50 turns north from I-64, briefly overlapping IL 158 until US 50 turns east.

In Lebanon, US 50 turns north and then east via IL 4. As it continues eastward, it remains a two-lane undivided highway. North of Trenton and Breese, each part of US 50 briefly becomes a four-lane divided highway with one diamond interchange each (one with IL 160 and one with Jamestown Road respectively). Each section reverts to an undivided highway.

In Carlyle, US 50 turns south and then back east (overlapping IL 127). In Sandoval, it turns north and then back east again (overlapping US 51). In Salem, it meets I-57 west of downtown and IL 37 within downtown.

=== Flora to Indiana state line ===
As US 50 meanders eastward, it eventually reaches US 45 north of Flora. At that point, US 45 runs concurrently with US 50. Then, it branches off south from US 50. Further east, it reaches Olney. At that point, IL 250 begins west of Noble and then travels northeast to downtown Noble and Olney. As US 50 intersects IL 130 south of Olney, IL 250 overlaps US 50.

Just north of Sumner, IL 250 moves off south to Sumner and Bridgeport. Just northwest of Lawrenceville, US 50 Business begins; it serves downtown Lawrenceville. Across the Embarras River, US 50 reaches a one-quadrant interchange with IL 1.

East of Lawrenceville, US 50 becomes a four-lane divided highway for the rest of its run in the state. It meets US 50 Business at an incomplete interchange, a diamond interchange, and IL 33 at a modified diamond interchange before exiting Illinois.

== History ==
Much of US 50 in Illinois, especially the section between Carlyle and Vincennes, lies atop or adjacent to the trail taken by George Rogers Clark and his 170 volunteers in the forlorn-hope march on Vincennes in February 1779.

Illinois Route 12
- Location: Missouri state line–Indiana state line
- Existed: 1918–1935

Up until 1935, Illinois Route 12 (IL 12) followed roughly along the old alignment of US 50 from the Missouri state line east of St. Louis to the Indiana state line west of Vincennes, IN. By 1935, IL 12 was decommissioned.

US 50 between Lebanon and Carlyle was moved to a northern alignment in October 1986 that bypassed several communities, including Trenton and Aviston.

As of 2011, much of US 50 is a two-lane highway, but portions around Lawrenceville and Vincennes are configured as a four-lane, limited access bypass, built to Interstate Highway standards in the 1960s. Another modern bypass portion between Lebanon and IL 127 shows evidence of a four-lane right of way as each bridge is paralleled by a second that remains unused and the graded roadbed for additional lanes is visible.

== Major intersections ==
| County | Location | mi | km | Destinations | Notes |
|---|---|---|---|---|---|
| Mississippi River | | 0.00 | 0.00 | I-255 west / US 50 west – Memphis, Tulsa | Continuation into Missouri |
| Mississippi River | | 0.00 | 0.00 | Jefferson Barracks Bridge | |
| Monroe | | 2.9 | 4.7 | IL 3 south | Southern end of IL 3 concurrency |
| St. Clair | | 7.2 | 11.6 | IL 3 north – Cahokia | Northern end of IL 3 concurrency |
| St. Clair | | 9.5 | 15.3 | IL 157 | |
| St. Clair | East St. Louis | 13.3 | 21.4 | IL 15 | |
| St. Clair | East St. Louis | 16.6 | 26.7 | I-64 west / I-255 north – St. Louis, Chicago | Northern end of I–255 concurrency; western end of I–64 concurrency |
| St. Clair | Fairview Heights | 17.9 | 28.8 | IL 157 | |
| St. Clair | Fairview Heights | 21.4 | 34.4 | IL 159 | |
| St. Clair | O'Fallon | 28.1 | 45.2 | I-64 east / IL 158 | Eastern end of I–64 concurrency |
| St. Clair | Lebanon | 32.9 | 52.9 | IL 4 south – Mascoutah | Southern end of IL 4 concurrency |
| St. Clair | Lebanon | 33.5 | 53.9 | IL 4 north | Northern end of IL 4 concurrency |
| Clinton | Trenton | 40.1 | 64.5 | IL 160 | |
| Clinton | Carlyle | 57.2 | 92.1 | IL 127 north | Northern end of IL 127 concurrency |
| Clinton | Carlyle | 58.3 | 93.8 | IL 127 south | Southern end of IL 127 concurrency |
| Marion | Sandoval | 72.4 | 116.5 | US 51 south – Centralia | Southern end of US 51 concurrency |
| Marion | | 72.6 | 116.8 | US 51 north – Vandalia | Northern end of US 51 concurrency |
| Marion | Salem | 80.4 | 129.4 | I-57 – Mt. Vernon, Effingham | |
| Marion | Salem | 81.8 | 131.6 | IL 37 – Mt. Vernon, Effingham | |
| Clay | Flora | 106.7 | 171.7 | US 45 north – Effingham | Western end of US 45 concurrency |
| Clay | Flora | 110.6 | 178.0 | US 45 south – Fairfield | Eastern end of US 45 concurrency |
| Richland | | 120.9 | 194.6 | IL 250 east | Western terminus of IL 250 |
| Richland | Olney | 129.6 | 208.6 | IL 250 west / IL 130 | Western end of IL 250 concurrency |
| Lawrence | | 142.2 | 228.8 | IL 250 east | Eastern end of IL 250 concurrency |
| Lawrence | Lawrenceville | 151.0 | 243.0 | US 50 Bus. east | Western terminus of US 50 BUS |
| Lawrence | Lawrenceville | 152.2 | 244.9 | IL 1 – Lawrenceville, Marshall | |
| Lawrence | Lawrenceville | 154.7 | 249.0 | US 50 Bus. west | Eastern terminus of US 50 BUS |
| Lawrence | | 159.5 | 256.7 | IL 33 north – Palestine, Vincennes | Southern terminus of IL 33 |
| Wabash River | | 165.79 | 266.81 | US 50 east – Vincennes | Indiana state line |
1.000 mi = 1.609 km; 1.000 km = 0.621 mi: Concurrency terminus

U.S. Route 50
| Previous state: Missouri | Illinois | Next state: Indiana |
