= Edward P. Petri =

American businessman and politician

Edward P. Petri (January 13, 1884 – July 23, 1949) was an American businessman and politician.

Petri was born in Millstadt, Illinois. He went to the Millstadt public schools and to the Belleville Commercial College. He serve as a committee clerk for the Illinois Senate in 1904. Petri then served as deputy sheriff and sheriff for St. Clair County, Illinois. Petri then served as the warden of the Southern Illinois Penitentiary from 1921 t0 1924. He was also involved with the grocery, insurance, real estate, and bank businesses. Petri was also involved with the title and abstract business. Petri lived in Belleville, Illinois with his wife and family. served in the Illinois House of Representatives from 1925 to 1931 and was a Republican. He died at St. Elizabeth Hospital in Belleville, Illinois from heart disease.
