= O'Fallon, Illinois =

- City
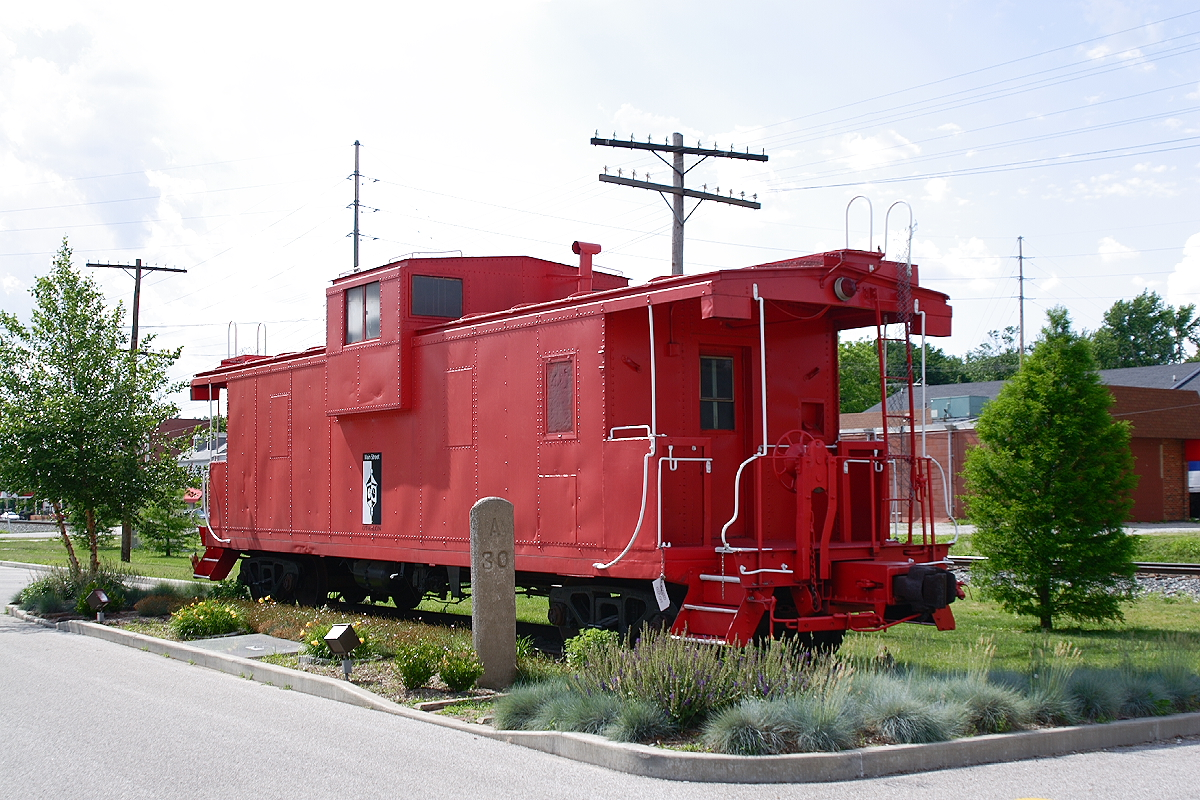
- The Illinois Central Railroad Downtown Caboose

- Flag Seal
- Nickname: "O-Town"
- Location of O'Fallon in St. Clair County, Illinois.
- Coordinates: 38°35′51″N 89°54′37″W!-- Area/postal codes and others -->
- Country: United States
- State: Illinois
- County: St. Clair
- Township: O'Fallon

Government
  - Type: Home rule

Area
  - Total: 15.70 sq mi (40.67 km^{2})
  - Land: 15.59 sq mi (40.39 km^{2})
  - Water: 0.11 sq mi (0.29 km^{2})
- Elevation: 538 ft (164 m)

Population (2020)
  - Total: 32,289
  - Density: 2,070.6/sq mi (799.48/km^{2})
- Time zone: UTC−6 (CST)
  - Summer (DST): UTC−5 (CDT)
- ZIP code: 62269
- Area code: 618
- FIPS code: 17-55249
- GNIS feature ID: 2395302
- Website: ofallon.org

O'Fallon is a city in St. Clair County, Illinois, United States. The 2020 census listed the population at 32,289. The city is the second largest city in the Metro East region and Southern Illinois. It sits 5 miles (8.0 km) from Scott Air Force Base and 18 miles (29 km) from Downtown St. Louis.

Like its namesake in St. Charles County, Missouri, O'Fallon is part of the St. Louis metro area. This makes O'Fallon (along with the two Troys in Illinois and Missouri) one of the few pairs of like-named municipalities to be part of the same metro region.

== History ==
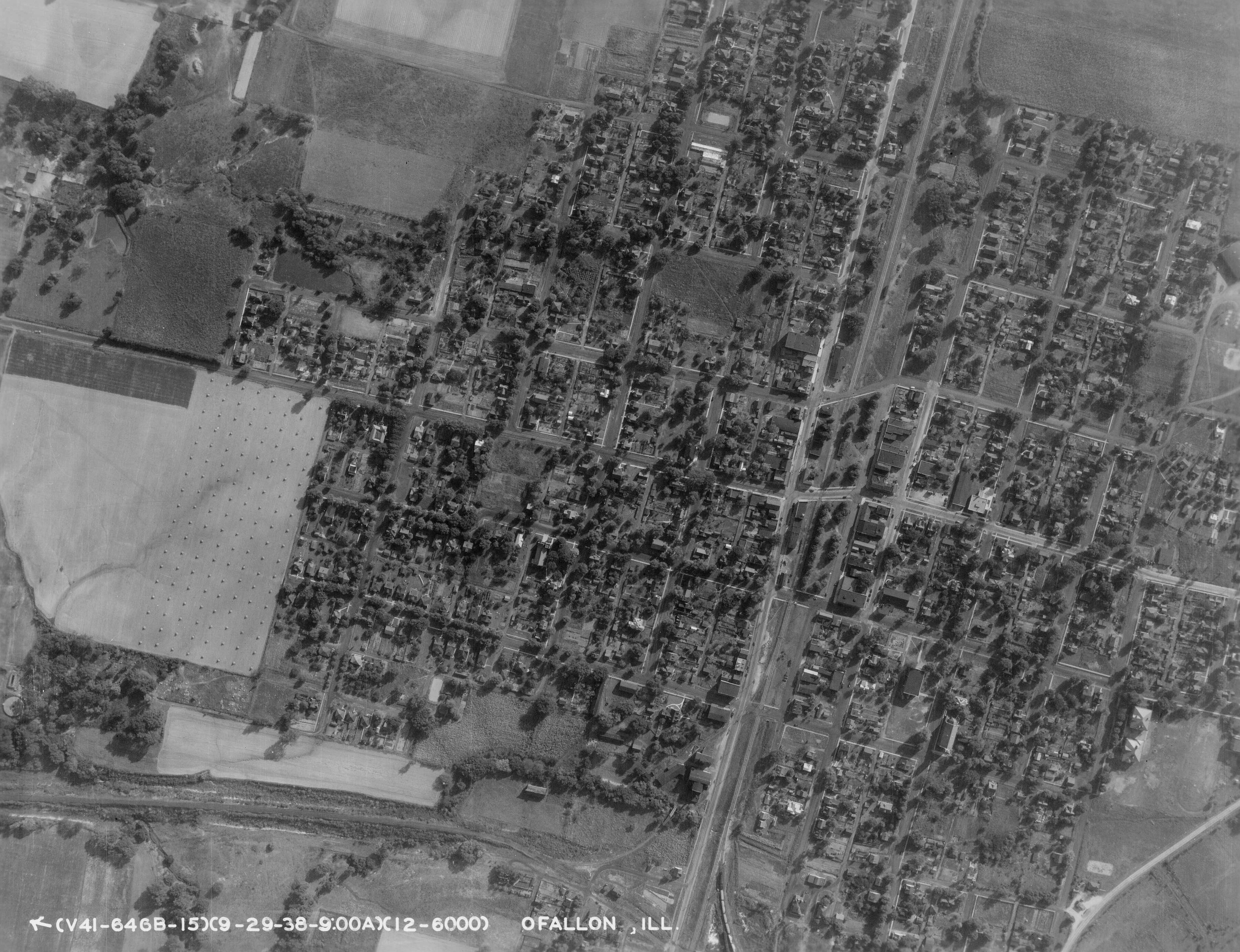
O'Fallon, 1938

Founded in 1854, O'Fallon's namesake comes from Colonel John O'Fallon who was a wealthy gentleman from St. Louis. In downtown O'Fallon, a Baltimore and Ohio Railroad railroad depot was built, which helped put O'Fallon on the map. City lots were platted and sold at a public auction on May 18, 1854. A post office was established the following year and the city began attracting German settlers looking for fertile farming land. On January 27, 1874, O'Fallon was incorporated as a village. On March 14, 1905, the citizens voted for a change to the city form of government. Since its founding, O'Fallon has gained population every decennial census year except 1930, when the census showed a net loss of six residents.

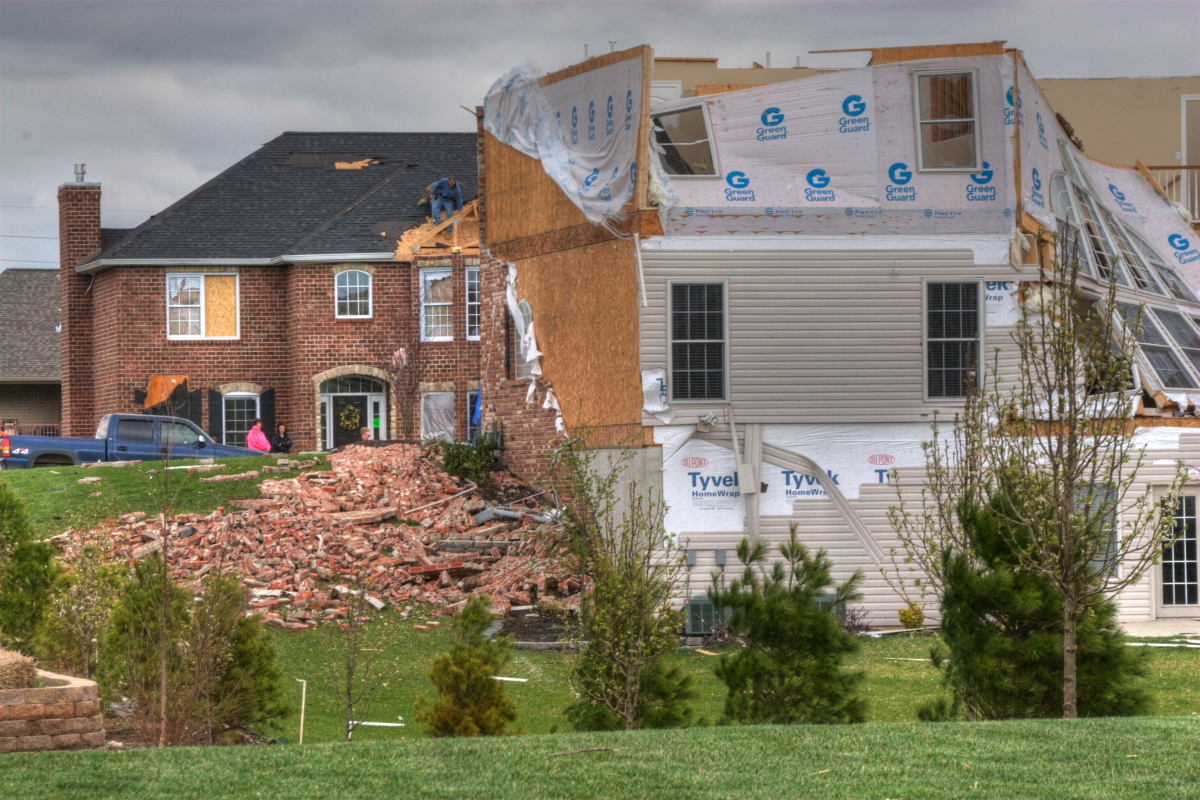
Tornado damage, 2006

The city center is approximately two miles east of the intersection of Interstate 64 and U.S. Route 50. Suburban growth in O'Fallon expanded considerably during the 1980s and following the expansion of Interstate 64 in the 1990s. Subdivisions include Thornbury Hill, Nolin Creek Estates, Fairwood Hills, Deer Creek, Forest Hills, and Fairwood East. O'Fallon Township High School's main campus at 600 South Smiley Street has undergone numerous additions over the past decades to ease overcrowding, including the creation of the separate 9th Grade Milburn Campus.

O'Fallon's city seal was designed in 1974 by Michael Donovan, an OTHS freshman, during a contest held by the O'Fallon Junior Woman's Club to create a city flag. In May 1975, the design was finalized by Louis Bradshaw and was then adopted by the city as its official flag. According to the 2004 publication by the O'Fallon Historical Society, O'Fallon Sesquicentennial History:

"The design is yellow gold on a blue background—the colors of the high school. The pick and shovel represent the coal mines that were so important to O'Fallon's economy for over 100 years. The locomotive represents the railroad to which O'Fallon owes its existence. The planes represent Scott Air Force Base where many in O'Fallon find employment—both military and civil service."

=== Events ===
- Tornado outbreak of April 2, 2006

== Geography ==
O'Fallon is located at 38°35′N 89°54′W (38.591549, −89.912000). O'Fallon is:

- 5 mi (8.0 km) from Scott Air Force Base
- 10 mi (16 km) from McKendree University
- and 17 mi (27 km) from St. Louis, Missouri

According to the 2010 census, the city has a total area of 14.48 square miles (37.5 km^{2}), of which 14.35 square miles (37.2 km^{2}) (or 99.10%) is land and 0.12 square miles (0.31 km^{2}) (or 0.83%) is water.

== Demographics ==
Historical population
| Census | Pop. | Note | %± |
|---|---|---|---|
| 1870 | 1,117 | | — |
| 1880 | 921 | | −17.5% |
| 1890 | 865 | | −6.1% |
| 1900 | 1,267 | | 46.5% |
| 1910 | 2,018 | | 59.3% |
| 1920 | 2,379 | | 17.9% |
| 1930 | 2,373 | | −0.3% |
| 1940 | 2,407 | | 1.4% |
| 1950 | 3,022 | | 25.6% |
| 1960 | 4,018 | | 33.0% |
| 1970 | 7,268 | | 80.9% |
| 1980 | 12,173 | | 67.5% |
| 1990 | 16,073 | | 32.0% |
| 2000 | 21,910 | | 36.3% |
| 2010 | 28,281 | | 29.1% |
| 2020 | 32,289 | | 14.2% |
U.S. Decennial Census; 2018 Estimate

=== Racial and ethnic composition ===
O'Fallon city, Illinois – Racial and ethnic composition Note: the US Census treats Hispanic/Latino as an ethnic category. This table excludes Latinos from the racial categories and assigns them to a separate category. Hispanics/Latinos may be of any race.
| Race / Ethnicity (NH = Non-Hispanic) | Pop 2000 | Pop 2010 | Pop 2020 | % 2000 | % 2010 | % 2020 |
|---|---|---|---|---|---|---|
| White alone (NH) | 17,831 | 21,279 | 22,344 | 81.38% | 75.24% | 69.20% |
| Black or African American alone (NH) | 2,603 | 4,372 | 5,200 | 11.88% | 15.46% | 16.10% |
| Native American or Alaska Native alone (NH) | 45 | 60 | 38 | 0.21% | 0.21% | 0.12% |
| Asian alone (NH) | 535 | 772 | 873 | 2.44% | 2.73% | 2.70% |
| Native Hawaiian or Pacific Islander alone (NH) | 15 | 26 | 32 | 0.07% | 0.09% | 0.10% |
| Other race alone (NH) | 53 | 27 | 162 | 0.24% | 0.10% | 0.50% |
| Mixed race or Multiracial (NH) | 340 | 763 | 2,011 | 1.55% | 2.70% | 6.23% |
| Hispanic or Latino (any race) | 488 | 982 | 1,629 | 2.23% | 3.47% | 5.05% |
| Total | 21,910 | 28,281 | 32,289 | 100.00% | 100.00% | 100.00% |

=== 2020 census ===
As of the 2020 census, O'Fallon had a population of 32,289 and 7,114 families living in the city; the population density was 2,959/sq mi (1,142/km^{2}).

The median age was 38.0 years. 26.1% of residents were under the age of 18 and 14.1% of residents were 65 years of age or older. For every 100 females there were 93.8 males, and for every 100 females age 18 and over there were 89.1 males age 18 and over.

99.6% of residents lived in urban areas, while 0.4% lived in rural areas.

There were 12,559 households in O'Fallon, of which 36.0% had children under the age of 18 living in them. Of all households, 53.6% were married-couple households, 15.0% were households with a male householder and no spouse or partner present, and 26.5% were households with a female householder and no spouse or partner present. About 26.1% of all households were made up of individuals and 11.1% had someone living alone who was 65 years of age or older.

There were 13,225 housing units at an average density of 1,158/sq mi (447/km^{2}), of which 5.0% were vacant. The homeowner vacancy rate was 1.4% and the rental vacancy rate was 6.7%.

Racial composition as of the 2020 census
| Race | Number | Percent |
|---|---|---|
| White | 22,792 | 70.6% |
| Black or African American | 5,288 | 16.4% |
| American Indian and Alaska Native | 72 | 0.2% |
| Asian | 887 | 2.7% |
| Native Hawaiian and Other Pacific Islander | 32 | 0.1% |
| Some other race | 466 | 1.4% |
| Two or more races | 2,752 | 8.5% |

== Annual events ==
- May - Memorial Day To Honor Those Who Gave their lives in service of the nation (O'Fallon Veterans Monument)
- November – Veterans Day Celebration at O'Fallon Veterans Monument; Veterans Day Parade - largest in the area
- November, the Saturday after Thanksgiving - Lighted Holiday Parade

== Parks and recreation ==
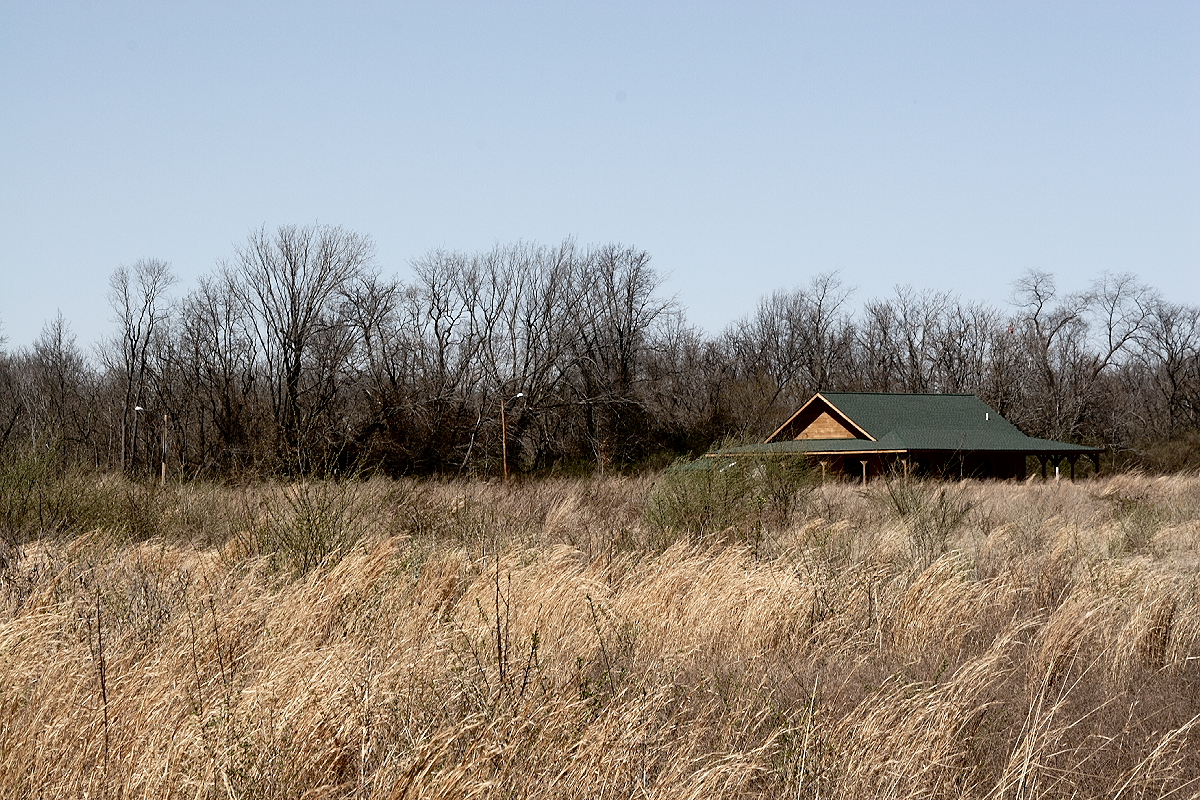
Rock Springs Nature Park

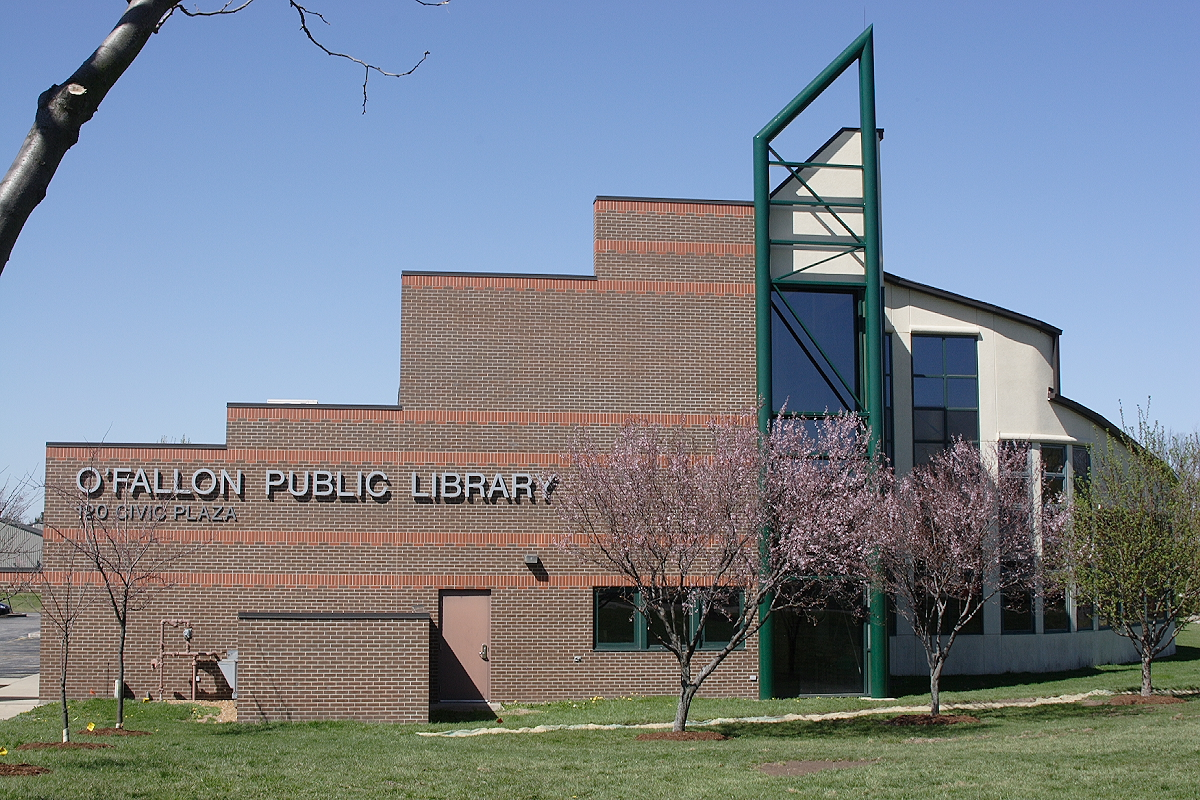
Public Library

O'Fallon Parks and Recreation

- Family Sports Park
- Hesse Park
- Katy Cavin's Community Center
- O'Fallon Community Park
- O'Fallon Memorial Pool
- Rock Springs Nature Park
  - Nature center
  - Jogging/cycling paths
  - Nature trails
  - Natural prairie
  - Dog Park
- MCT Goshen Trailhead
- St. Clair Recreation Complex
- St. Ellen Mine Park
- Thoman Park
- Veteran's Monument

Library

- O'Fallon Public Library

Registered historic places

- Scott Field Historic District

== Schools ==
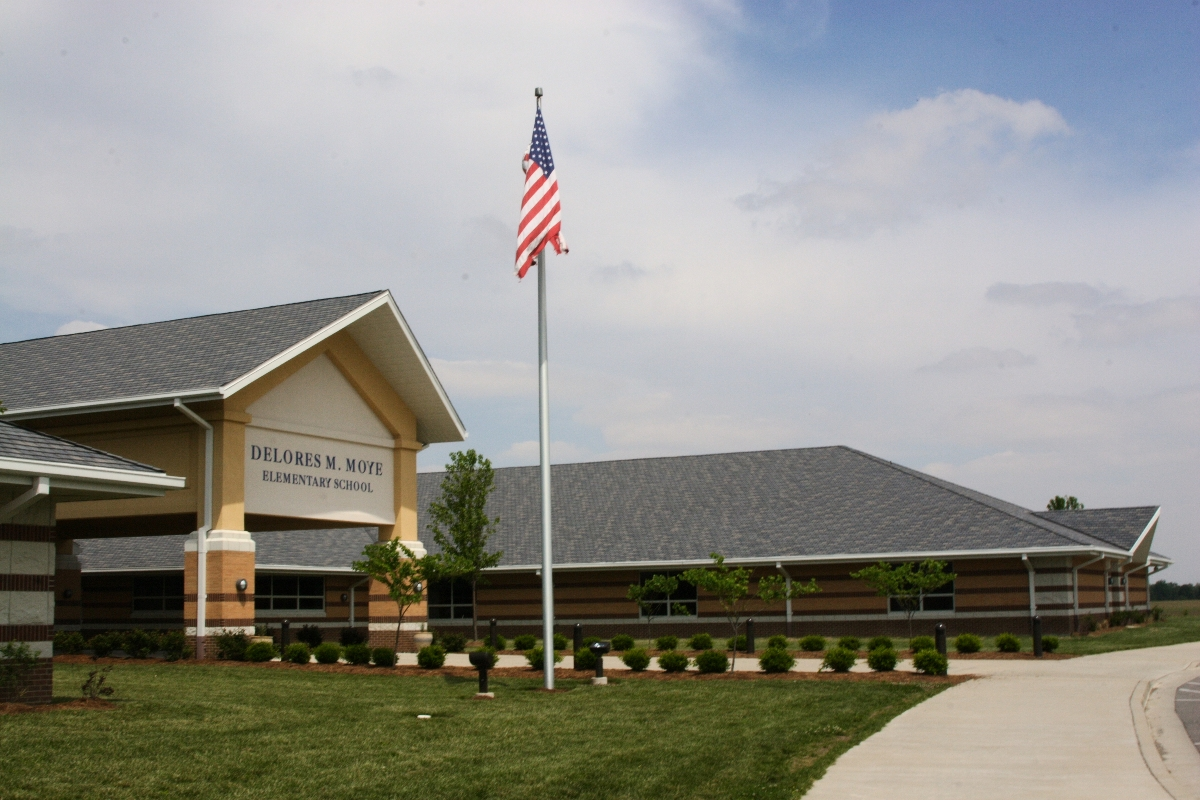
Delores Moye School

- O'Fallon Community Consolidated School District #90
  - Delores Moye Elementary School
  - Estelle Kampmeyer Elementary School
  - J. E. Hinchcliffe Sr. Elementary School
  - Laverna Evans Elementary School
  - Marie Schaefer Elementary School
  - Amelia V. Carriel Junior High School
  - Edward A. Fulton Junior High School
- O'Fallon Central School District #104
- O'Fallon Township High School District No. 203
  - O'Fallon Township High School
  - Includes Milburn Freshman Campus

Private schools

- Discovery School
- St. Clare Catholic School
- First Baptist Academy

== Notable people ==
- Cbabi Bayoc, illustrator
- Bob Cryder, professional football player
- Bernie Fuchs, illustrator
- William Holden, Academy Award-winning actor
- Joseph W. Schmitt, spacesuit technician for the National Aeronautics and Space Administration

== Gallery ==
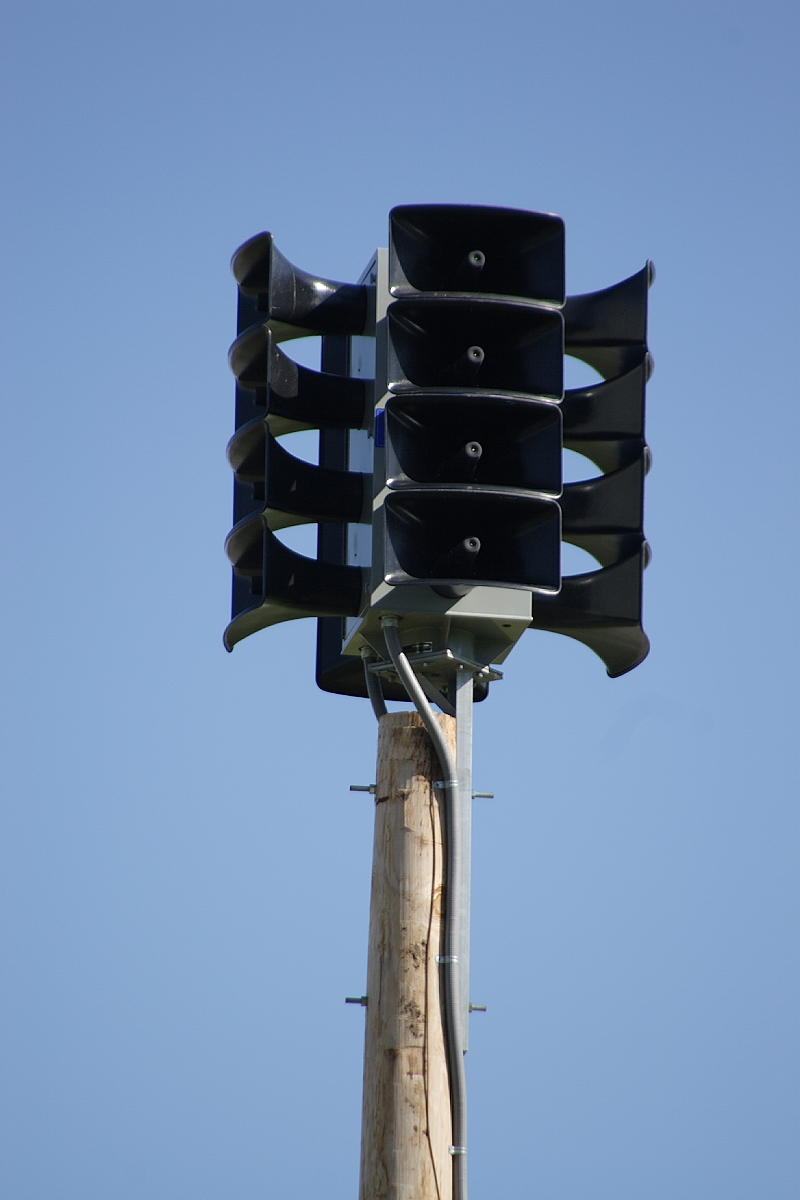
City Civil defense siren

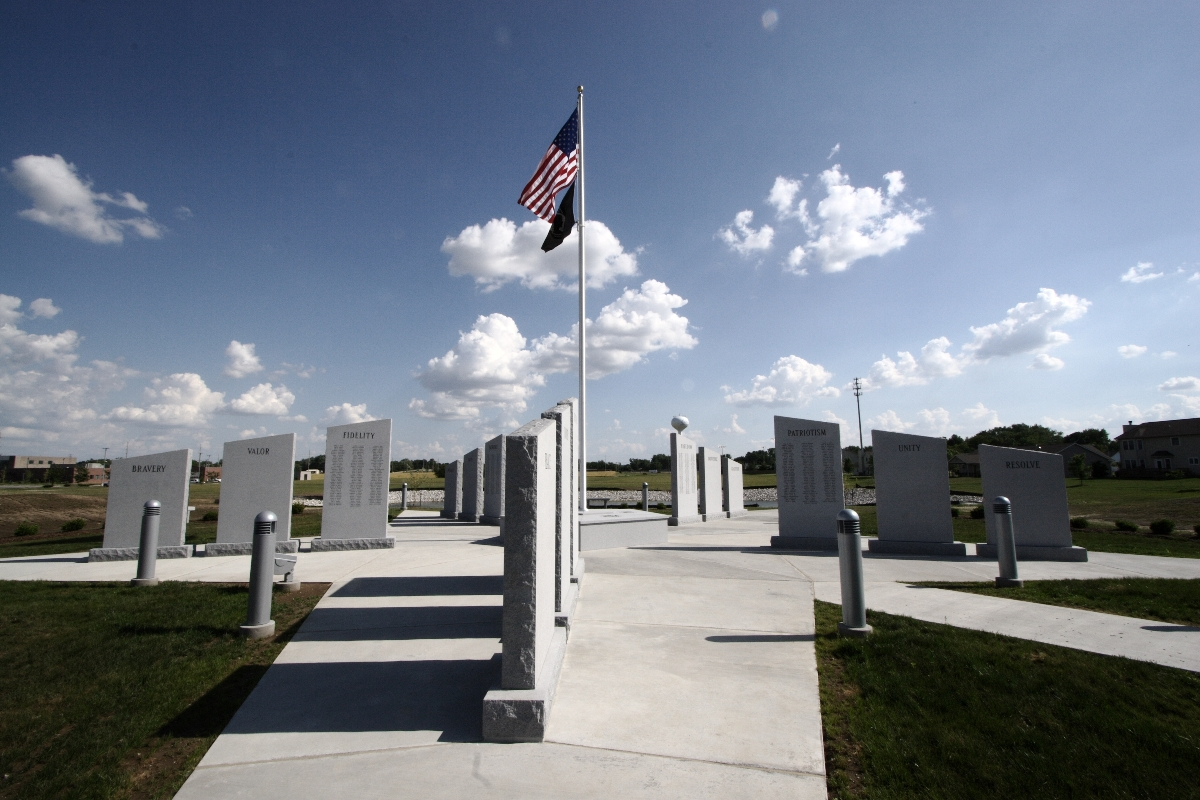
O’Fallon War Memorial

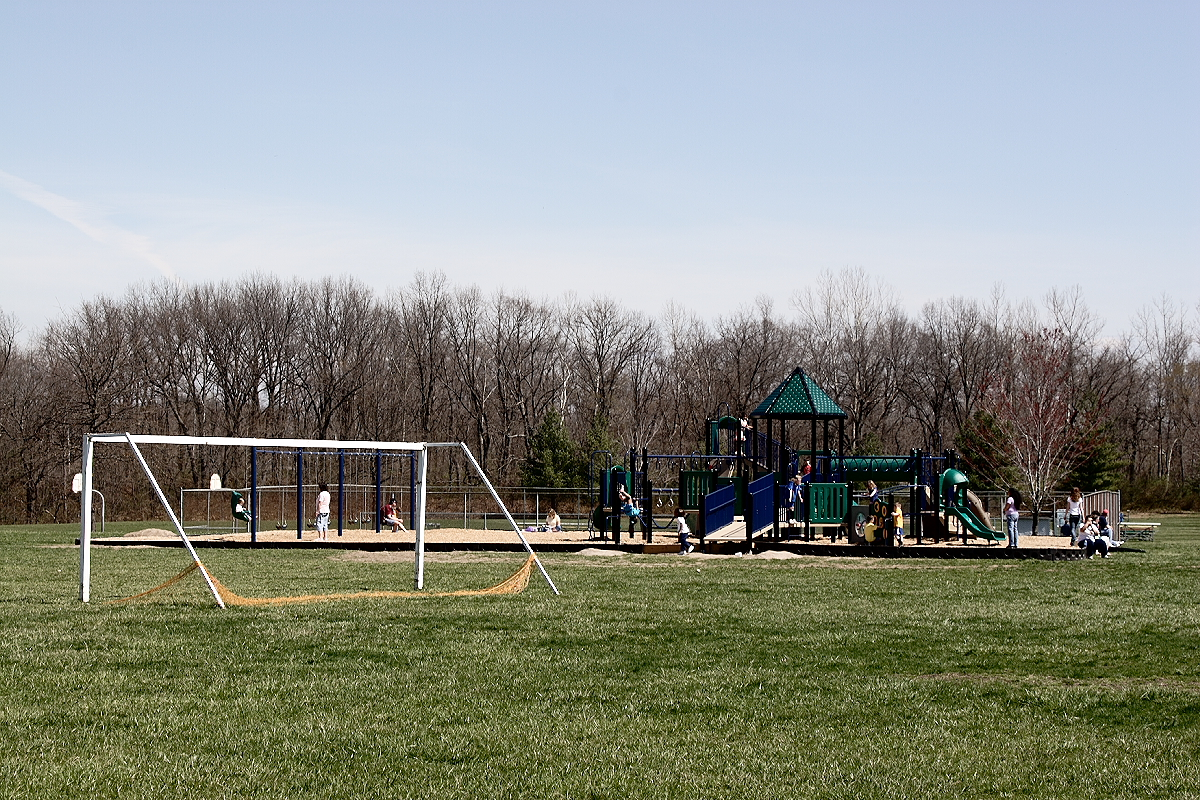
Hesse Park
