= Millstadt, Illinois =

Millstadt
- Village
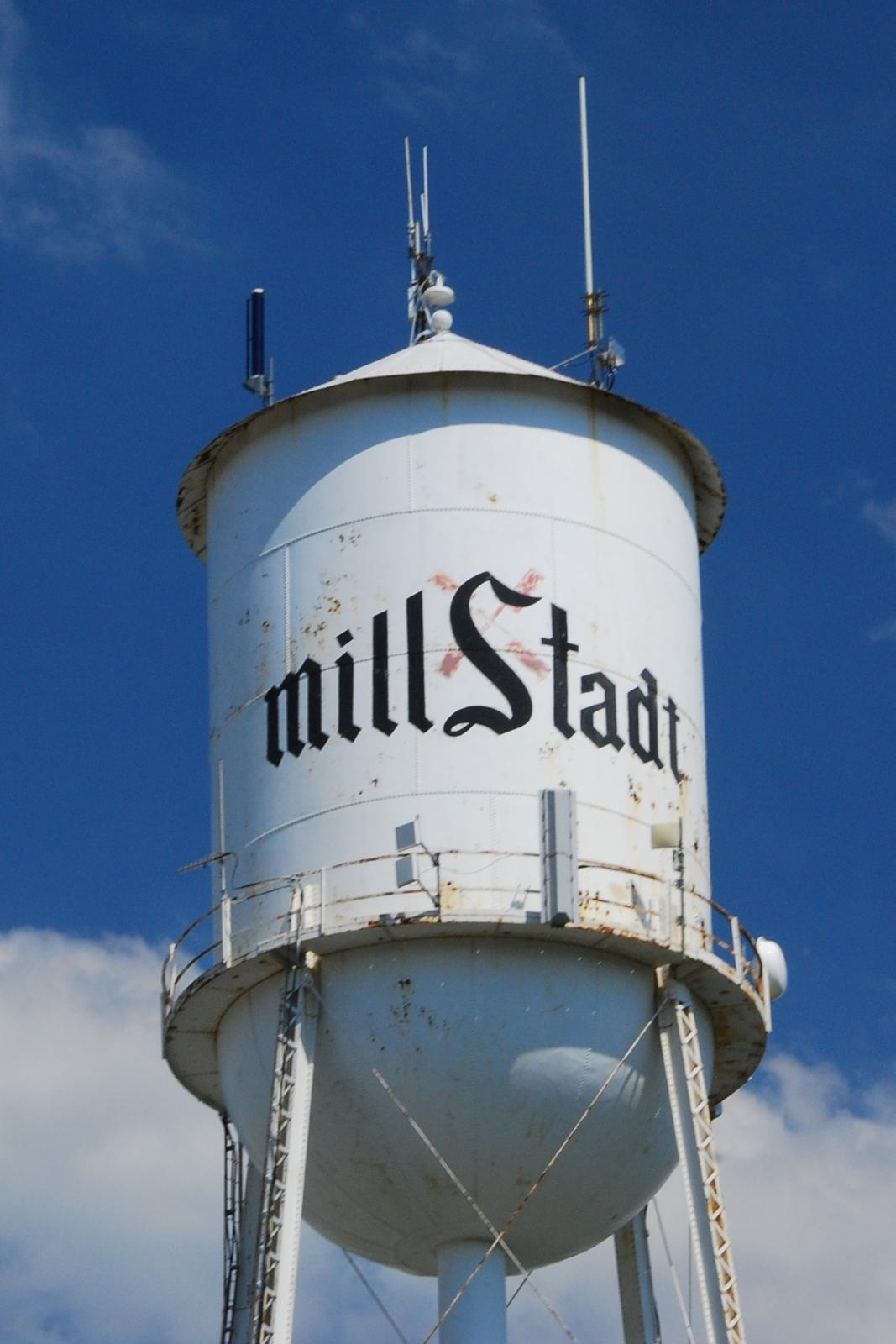
- Millstadt water tower

- Location of Millstadt in St. Clair County, Illinois.
- Coordinates: 38°27′29″N 90°05′00″W
- Country: United States
- State: Illinois
- County: St. Clair

Area
  - Total: 3.67 sq mi (9.50 km^{2})
  - Land: 3.49 sq mi (9.04 km^{2})
  - Water: 0.18 sq mi (0.46 km^{2})
- Elevation: 600 ft (180 m)

Population (2020)
  - Total: 4,071
  - Density: 1,166.3/sq mi (450.31/km^{2})
- Time zone: UTC-6 (CST)
  - Summer (DST): UTC-5 (CDT)
- ZIP codes: 62260/62220
- Area code: 618
- FIPS code: 17-49386
- GNIS feature ID: 2399363
- Website: villageofmillstadt.org

Millstadt is a village in St. Clair County, Illinois, United States, located at the crossing of Illinois Routes 163 (locally, "Jefferson Avenue") and 158 (locally, "Washington Avenue"). The village is known for its German heritage, with more than half its people of German descent. The population was 4,071, as of the 2020 census.

== History ==
In 1874, a German immigrant farm family was killed in a farming hamlet known as Saxtown, just south of the town. It made national headlines and became the subject of the book The Ax Murders of Saxtown.

In 1883, The St. Louis and Cairo Railroad built a branch line to Millstadt. The first train arrived in Millstadt November 13, 1883. The line was sold with the company to the Mobile and Ohio Railroad in 1886, and ran until the line shut down July 1961.

== Geography ==
According to the 2010 census, the village has a total area of 3.58 square miles (9.3 km^{2}), of which 3.41 square miles (8.8 km^{2}) (or 95.25%) is land and 0.17 square miles (0.44 km^{2}) (or 4.75%) is water.

The town center is formed by the intersection of two state highways. Illinois Route 158, or Washington Avenue, leads west to Columbia and east to Belleville. The other main street is Jefferson Avenue, the north part of which forms the southern end of Illinois Route 163, leading north to Centreville, where it intersects highways providing access to East St. Louis. The south end of Jefferson Avenue, as it leaves Millstadt, becomes Floraville Road.

== Demographics ==
Historical population
Census	Pop.	Note	%±
1880	1,229		—
1890	1,186		−3.5%
1900	1,172		−1.2%
1910	1,140		−2.7%
1920	907		−20.4%
1930	1,014		11.8%
1940	1,290		27.2%
1950	1,566		21.4%
1960	1,830		16.9%
1970	2,168		18.5%
1980	2,736		26.2%
1990	2,566		−6.2%
2000	2,794		8.9%
2010	4,011		43.6%
2020	4,071		1.5%
U.S. Decennial Census

=== 2020 census ===
As of the 2020 census, Millstadt had a population of 4,071. The median age was 42.4 years. 22.4% of residents were under the age of 18 and 20.5% of residents were 65 years of age or older. For every 100 females there were 92.8 males, and for every 100 females age 18 and over there were 88.3 males age 18 and over.

0.0% of residents lived in urban areas, while 100.0% lived in rural areas.

There were 1,694 households in Millstadt, of which 29.6% had children under the age of 18 living in them. Of all households, 54.0% were married-couple households, 15.0% were households with a male householder and no spouse or partner present, and 25.5% were households with a female householder and no spouse or partner present. About 27.9% of all households were made up of individuals and 14.0% had someone living alone who was 65 years of age or older.

There were 1,778 housing units, of which 4.7% were vacant. The homeowner vacancy rate was 1.3% and the rental vacancy rate was 4.9%.

Racial composition as of the 2020 census
Race	Number	Percent
White	3,810	93.6%
Black or African American	22	0.5%
American Indian and Alaska Native	6	0.1%
Asian	20	0.5%
Native Hawaiian and Other Pacific Islander	1	0.0%
Some other race	21	0.5%
Two or more races	191	4.7%
Hispanic or Latino (of any race)	70	1.7%

=== 2000 census ===
As of the census of 2000, there were 2,794 people, 1,148 households, and 813 families residing in the village. The population density was 2,511.9 inhabitants per square mile (969.9/km^{2}). There were 1,196 housing units at an average density of 1,075.2 per square mile (415.1/km^{2}). The racial makeup of the village was 99% White, 0% Native American, 1% Asian, 0% from other races, and 0% from two or more races. Hispanic or Latino of any race were 0% of the population.

There were 1,148 households, out of which 31.8% had children under the age of 18 living with them, 59.1% were married couples living together, 8.9% had a female householder with no husband present, and 29.1% were non-families. 25.3% of all households were made up of individuals, and 12.5% had someone living alone who was 65 years of age or older. The average household size was 2.43 and the average family size was 2.92.

In the village, the population was spread out, with 23.7% under the age of 18, 7.6% from 18 to 24, 28.6% from 25 to 44, 22.9% from 45 to 64, and 17.3% who were 65 years of age or older. The median age was 39 years. For every 100 females there were 91.5 males. For every 100 females age 18 and over, there were 87.5 males.

The median income for a household in the village was $47,824, and the median income for a family was $56,378. Males had a median income of $40,893 versus $27,196 for females. The per capita income for the village was $21,914. About 3.2% of families and 4.0% of the population were below the poverty line, including 5.9% of those under age 18 and 5.1% of those age 65 or over.

== Economy ==
A 25.5-kW solar array on a barn at Magill Farms came into service in 2021.

== Schools, churches, cemeteries ==
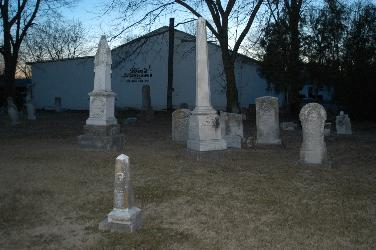
Centreville Cemetery, one of Millstadt's oldest graveyards

- Elementary schools:
  - Millstadt Primary Center
  - Millstadt Consolidated School
  - St. James Catholic School
- High schools: (all are in nearby Belleville, Illinois)
  - Althoff Catholic High School
  - Belleville High School-West
- Churches in Millstadt:
  - Christian Assembly Church (non-denominational)
  - Concordia United Church of Christ (United Church of Christ)
  - Countryside Family Church
  - St. James Catholic Church (Roman Catholic)
  - Trinity Lutheran Church (Missouri Synod)
  - Zion Evangelical Church (Evangelical Association)
- Cemeteries:
  - Millstadt Cemetery (aka Centreville Cemetery)
  - Mount Evergreen Cemetery
  - St. James Catholic Cemetery

== Notable people ==
- William N. Baltz, U.S. Representative and Millstadt mayor.
- Ted Banker, former NFL player for the New York Jets and Cleveland Browns
- Miles Dewey Davis Jr., father of jazz trumpeter Miles Davis
- Fred J. Kern, U.S. Representative
- Edward P. Petri, Illinois state representative, sheriff, and businessman
- Kevin Schmidt, Illinois state representative
- Austin Seibert, NFL kicker, currently a free agent, played in college for the Oklahoma Sooners
- Waldemar F. A. Wendt, Admiral in the United States Navy

== Sister cities ==
- Groß-Bieberau (Germany)

== See also ==
- Roman Catholic Diocese of Belleville
