= Fairview Heights, Illinois =

Fairview Heights
- City
- Location of Fairview Heights in St. Clair County, Illinois.
- Coordinates: 38°36′30″N 89°59′16″W
- Country: United States
- State: Illinois
- County: St. Clair

Area
  - Total: 11.50 sq mi (29.79 km^{2})
  - Land: 11.43 sq mi (29.61 km^{2})
  - Water: 0.069 sq mi (0.18 km^{2})
- Elevation: 581 ft (177 m)

Population (2020)
  - Total: 16,706
  - Density: 1,461.5/sq mi (564.28/km^{2})
- Time zone: UTC-6 (CST)
  - Summer (DST): UTC-5 (CDT)
- ZIP code: 62208
- Area code: 618
- FIPS code: 17-25141
- GNIS feature ID: 2394737
- Website: cofh.org

Fairview Heights is a city in St. Clair County, Illinois, United States within Greater St. Louis. It is an eastern suburb of St. Louis. As of the 2020 census, Fairview Heights had a population of 16,706.

== Geography ==
According to the 2010 census, Fairview Heights has a total area of 11.497 square miles (29.78 km^{2}), of which 11.42 square miles (29.58 km^{2}) (or 99.33%) is land and 0.077 square miles (0.20 km^{2}) (or 0.67%) is water.

French Village is an unincorporated community located immediately west of Fairview Heights.

== Demographics ==
Fairview Heights, Illinois – Racial and ethnic composition Note: the US Census treats Hispanic/Latino as an ethnic category. This table excludes Latinos from the racial categories and assigns them to a separate category. Hispanics/Latinos may be of any race.
Race / Ethnicity (NH = Non-Hispanic)	Pop 2000	Pop 2010	Pop 2020	% 2000	% 2010	% 2020
White alone (NH)	11,628	11,123	9,146	77.34%	65.13%	54.75%
Black or African American alone (NH)	2,559	4,518	5,215	17.02%	26.46%	31.22%
Native American or Alaska Native alone (NH)	24	47	24	0.16%	0.28%	0.14%
Asian alone (NH)	320	464	478	2.13%	2.72%	2.86%
Native Hawaiian or Pacific Islander alone (NH)	1	8	11	0.01%	0.05%	0.07%
Other race alone (NH)	26	28	106	0.17%	0.16%	0.63%
Mixed race or Multiracial (NH)	187	371	995	1.24%	2.17%	5.96%
Hispanic or Latino (any race)	289	519	731	1.92%	3.04%	4.38%
Total	15,034	17,078	16,706	100.00%	100.00%	100.00%

Historical population
Census	Pop.	Note	%±
1970	10,050		—
1980	12,111		20.5%
1990	14,351		18.5%
2000	15,034		4.8%
2010	17,078		13.6%
2020	16,706		−2.2%
U.S. Decennial Census

=== 2020 census ===
As of the 2020 census, Fairview Heights had a population of 16,706. The median age was 41.8 years. 19.5% of residents were under the age of 18 and 18.6% of residents were 65 years of age or older. For every 100 females there were 94.7 males, and for every 100 females age 18 and over there were 91.5 males age 18 and over.

100.0% of residents lived in urban areas, while 0.0% lived in rural areas.

There were 7,197 households in Fairview Heights, of which 25.5% had children under the age of 18 living in them. Of all households, 43.0% were married-couple households, 20.6% were households with a male householder and no spouse or partner present, and 30.2% were households with a female householder and no spouse or partner present. About 31.7% of all households were made up of individuals and 11.9% had someone living alone who was 65 years of age or older.

There were 7,931 housing units, of which 9.3% were vacant. The homeowner vacancy rate was 2.4% and the rental vacancy rate was 12.9%.

=== 2000 census ===
At the 2000 census there were 15,034 people, 6,026 households, and 4,206 families living in the city. The population density was 1,348.6 inhabitants per square mile (520.7/km^{2}). There were 6,310 housing units at an average density of 566.0 per square mile (218.5/km^{2}).

Of the 6,026 households 29.3% had children under the age of 18 living with them, 55.4% were married couples living together, 10.9% had a female householder with no husband present, and 30.2% were non-families. 26.6% of households were one person and 10.4% were one person aged 65 or older. The average household size was 2.48 and the average family size was 3.00.

The age distribution was 23.4% under the age of 18, 7.3% from 18 to 24, 29.1% from 25 to 44, 23.8% from 45 to 64, and 16.4% 65 or older. The median age was 39 years. For every 100 females age 18 and over, there were 89.2 males.

The median household income was $49,131 and the median family income was $56,161. Males had a median income of $38,287 versus $27,218 for females. The per capita income for the city was $22,614. About 4.2% of families and 5.9% of the population were below the poverty line, including 8.7% of those under age 18 and 6.1% of those age 65 or over.

== Education ==
Three elementary/middle school districts serve Fairview Heights: Grant-Illini District 110 covers the west side of the community, and Pontiac William Holliday School District 105 covers the east side of town. A small portion on the northeast corner of the community is covered by O'Fallon District 90 and another portion on the far western edge is served by East St. Louis District 189. Trade colleges in Fairview Heights, IL include the Regency Beauty Institute and formerly Vatterott College. The Grant-Illini District 110 sends students almost exclusively to Belleville High School-East.
