= List of Interstate Highways in Illinois =

Interstate Highway System in Illinois
- Standard Illinois Interstate Highway markers
- Interstate Highway system in Illinois

System information
- Maintained by IDOT, ISTHA, and SCC
- Length: 2,248.93 mi (3,619.30 km)
- Formed: June 29, 1956

Highway names
- Interstates: Interstate X (I-X)
- US Highways: U.S. Route X (US X)
- State: Illinois Route X (IL X)

System links
- Illinois State Highway System; Interstate; US; State; Tollways; Scenic

The Interstate Highways in Illinois are all segments of the Interstate Highway System that are owned and maintained by the U.S. state of Illinois. The Illinois Department of Transportation (IDOT), Illinois State Toll Highway Authority (ISTHA), and Skyway Concession Company (SCC) are responsible for maintaining these highways in Illinois. The Interstate Highway System in Illinois consists of 13 primary highways and 11 auxiliary highways which cover 2,248.93 miles (3,619.30 km). The Interstate Highway with the longest section in Illinois is Interstate 57 at 358.57 miles (577.06 km); the shortest is Interstate 41 at 0.90 miles (1.45 km).

== Primary Interstate Highways ==
Number	Length (mi)	Length (km)	Southern or western terminus	Northern or eastern terminus	Formed	Removed	Notes
I-24	38.73	62.33	I-57 in Williamson County	I-24 at Metropolis	1977	current	
I-39	123.42	198.63	I-55 in Normal	I-39/I-90 in South Beloit	1989	current	
I-41	0.96	1.54	I-94/US 41 in Russell	I-41/I-94/US 41 near Russell	2015	current	Overlaps I-94 from the US 41 split north to the state line
I-55	294.38	473.76	I-55/I-64 in East St. Louis	US 41 in Chicago	1960	current	
I-57	364.16	586.06	I-57 near Cairo	I-94 in Chicago	1969	current	Longest Interstate in Illinois
I-64	128.12	206.19	I-55/I-64 in East St. Louis	I-64 in Grayville	1974	current	
I-66	—	—	Missouri state line	Kentucky state line	1991	2015	Cancelled proposal that was part of the planned East–West TransAmerica Corridor
I-70	160.38	258.11	I-70 in East St. Louis	I-70 in Clark County	—	—	
I-72	177.35	285.42	I-72/US 36 in Pike County	I-57 in Champaign	1970	current	
I-74	220.34	354.60	I-74/US 6 in Moline	I-74 in Danville	—	—	Everett McKinley Dirksen Memorial Highway
I-80	163.52	263.16	I-80 in Rock Island County	I-80/I-94/US 6 in Lansing	1967	current	
I-88	140.60	226.27	I-80 in Silvis	I-290 in Hillside	1987	current	Overlaps IL 110 through the entire route, Ronald Reagan Memorial Tollway
I-90	107.49	172.99	I-39/I-90 in South Beloit	I-90 in Chicago	—	—	
I-94	61.53	99.02	I-41/I-94/US 41 near Russell	I-80/I-94/US 6 in Lansing	—	—	
Former

== Auxiliary Interstate Highways ==
Number	Length (mi)	Length (km)	Southern or western terminus	Northern or eastern terminus	Formed	Removed	Notes
I-155	32.13	51.71	I-55 near Lincoln	I-74 in Morton	1992	current	
I-172	19.69	31.69	I-72/US 36 in Fall Creek	US 24/IL 336 in Fowler	1995	current	Overlaps IL 110 through the entire route
I-180	13.19	21.23	IL 26/IL 71 in Hennepin	I-80 in Bureau County	1967	current	
I-190	3.07	4.94	O'Hare International Airport	I-90 in Chicago	1978	current	Shortest auxiliary Interstate in Illinois, Kennedy Expressway
I-255	27.05	43.53	I-255/US 50 in Columbia	I-270/IL 255 in Pontoon Beach	1967	current	
I-270	14.97	24.09	I-270 in Madison County	I-55/I-70 in Troy	1956	current	
I-280	17.60	28.32	I-280 in Rock Island	I-74/I-80 in Colona	—	—	
I-290	29.84	48.02	I-90/IL 53 in Schaumburg	I-90/I-94 in Chicago	1955	current	Dwight D. Eisenhower Expressway
I-294 Toll	53.42	85.97	I-80/I-94/US 6/IL 394 in South Holland	I-94 in Northbrook	1957	current	Longest auxiliary Interstate in Illinois, Tri-State Tollway
I-355	32.51	52.32	I-80 in New Lenox	I-290 in Itasca	1989	current	Veterans Memorial Tollway
I-474	14.88	23.95	I-74/IL 6 in Peoria	I-74 in East Peoria	—	—	Peoria Bypass
I-490 Toll	1.5	2.4	I-294 in Franklin Park	I-90 in Des Plaines	2026	current	Opened in 2026
I-494	—	—	—	—	—	—	Proposal for Lake Shore Drive
I-494	—	—	—	—	—	—	Proposed and cancelled Crosstown Expressway
Former

== Business loops ==
Number	Length (mi)	Length (km)	Southern or western terminus	Northern or eastern terminus	Formed	Removed	Notes
I-55 BL	13.9	22.4	I-55/I-72/US 36 in Springfield	I-55 in Williams Township	—	—	Serves Springfield
I-55 BL	—	—	I-55 in Fogarty	I-55 in Lincoln	—	—	Serves Lincoln
I-55 BL	9.6	15.4	I-55/I-74/US 51 in Bloomington	I-55 in Normal	—	—	Serves Normal and Bloomington
I-72 BL	9.5	15.3	I-72/US 36/US 67 southwest of Jacksonville	I-72 in Jacksonville	—	—	Serves Jacksonville
