= Illinois State Highway System =

Highway system in Illinois, United States

State Highway System
- Highway markers for Interstate 57, U.S. Route 45, Illinois Route 1 and the Chicago Skyway

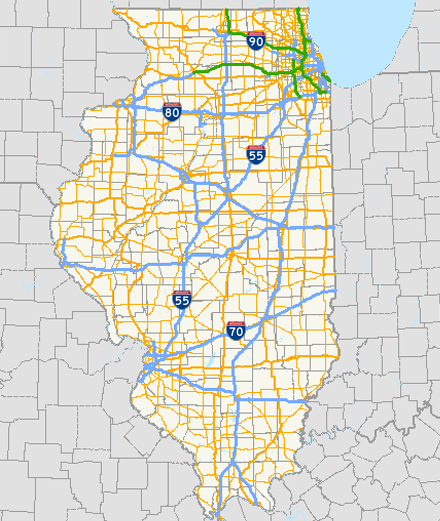
- Overall map of system: freeways in light blue, tollways in green, other highways in yellow

System information
- Maintained by IDOT, ISTHA, and SCC
- Formed: November 5, 1918

Highway names
- Interstates: Interstate X (I-X)
- US Highways: U.S. Route X (US X)
- State: Illinois Route X (IL X)

System links
- Illinois State Highway System; Interstate; US; State; Tollways; Scenic

The organized State Highway System of the U.S. state of Illinois comprises all of the state routes in the state.

== Illinois Highway Code ==
The Illinois Highway Code (605 ILCS 5) states that all state highways are to be numbered and that no state highway shall go unnumbered. In addition, roads in the system include state highways that connect

any State park, State forest, State wildlife or fish refuge, the grounds of any State institution or any recreational, scenic or historic place owned or operated by the State; any national cemetery; and to any tax supported airport constructed in part by State and federal funds

Descriptions of each individual state highway are filed with the county clerk of the county in which the state highway resides. State highways may be maintained by either the municipalities if within a municipality, or the Illinois Department of Transportation. Should a highway run through a municipality, IDOT is authorized to choose a route through the municipality in order to make a route contiguous for through traffic.

== History ==
The State Highway System was created in 1918 with the first State Bond Issue (SBI) Routes, 1 through 46. Bonds were floated to pay for specific routes. SBI # 1 paid for Route 1, and so on. These initial 46 route numbers marked the major infrastructure roads desired by the state legislature in 1918. Remarkably, many of these numbers still exist on the original or nearby alignment. As the highway system grew these numbers were altered to accommodate new roads or extensions of older roads.

In 1924, additional State Bond Issues were authorized for SBI Routes 47 through 185. These route numbers were originally assigned and grouped to specific regions of the state. Thus, it is not uncommon to find groups of routes with similar numbers around each other (routes 23, 26, and 29 are found in north-central Illinois, while routes 53, 56, 58, 59, 60, 62, 64, 68 and 72 are all found in northeastern Illinois and routes 100, 101, 103, 104, 105, 107 are found in western Illinois west of the Illinois River and largely south of the McDonough County line.

SBI Route numbers that were superseded by other routes, US or state routes were often reused. For example, SBI Route 61 was originally assigned to a road segment in northeastern Illinois, but was reassigned to a route in western Illinois, sometime after 1937.

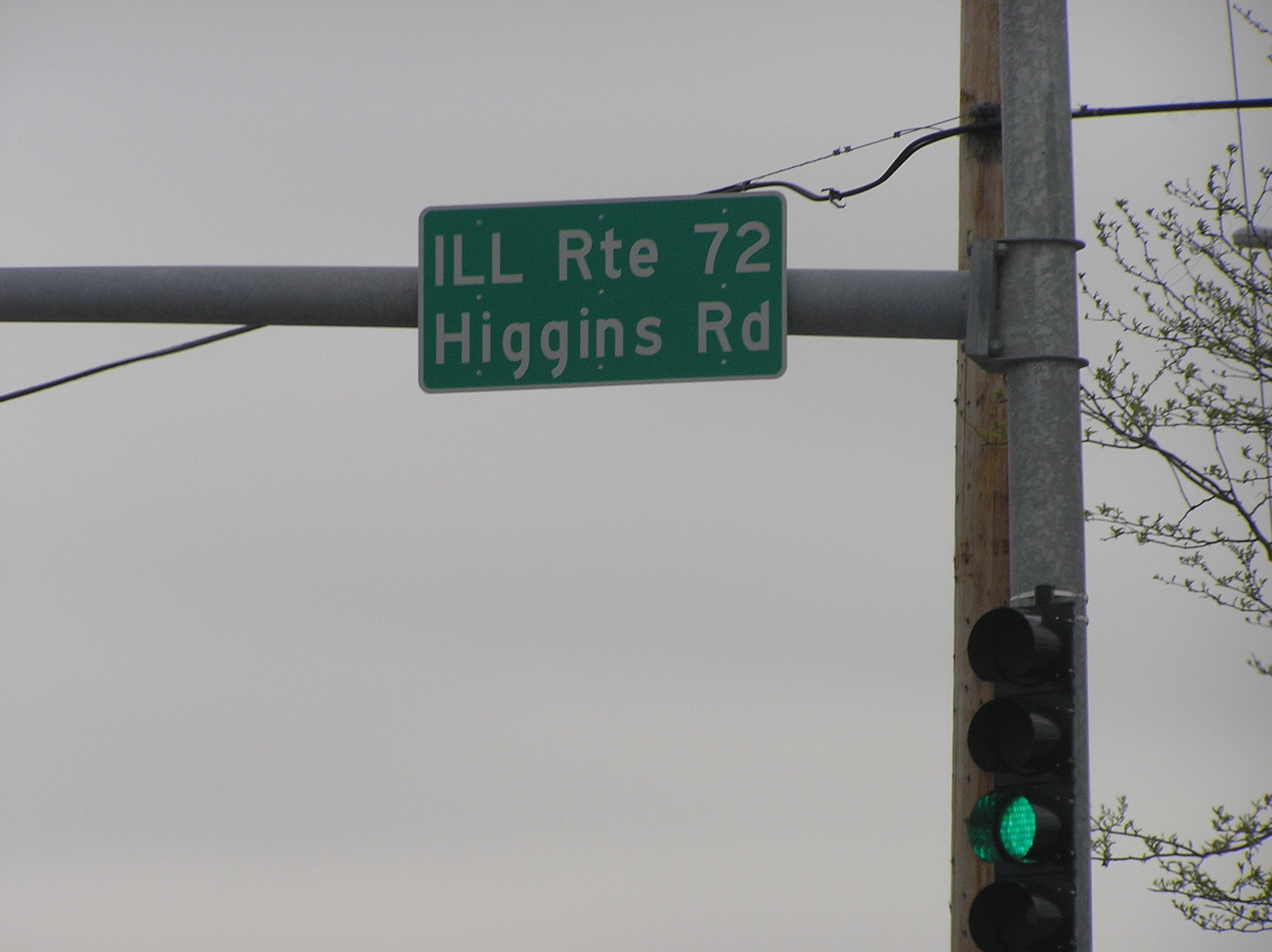
Illinois Route 72 cross-sign mounted on a stoplight in Hoffman Estates

SBI Numbers are still used for several purposes, even when they do not match the posted number. IDOT District maps still refer to SBI numbers on the various roads it maintains, along with other non-posted designations that refer to how the route was authorized. Bridge weight plates refer to SBI numbers instead of posted route numbers as well. For example, bridge plates along old US-66 refer to the route as "SBI-4"

When the United States Numbered Highway System was started in 1926, the US numbers were just tacked onto the existing IL/SBI number unless the US Route was routed along a new route.
