= Looking Glass Township, Clinton County, Illinois =

Looking Glass Township
- Township
- Location in Clinton County

- Clinton County's location in Illinois
- Coordinates: 38°30′41″N 89°39′20″W
- Country: United States
- State: Illinois
- County: Clinton
- Established: November 4, 1873

Area
  - Total: 50.71 sq mi (131.3 km^{2})
  - Land: 50.42 sq mi (130.6 km^{2})
  - Water: 0.29 sq mi (0.75 km^{2}) 0.57%
- Elevation: 430 ft (131 m)

Population (2020)
  - Total: 6,447
  - Density: 127.9/sq mi (49.37/km^{2})
- Time zone: UTC-6 (CST)
  - Summer (DST): UTC-5 (CDT)
- ZIP codes: 62215, 62245, 62265, 62266, 62293
- FIPS code: 17-027-44667

Looking Glass Township is one of fifteen townships in Clinton County, Illinois, USA. As of the 2020 census, its population was 6,447 and it contained 2,498 housing units.

== Geography ==
According to the 2010 census, the township has a total area of 50.71 square miles (131.3 km^{2}), of which 50.42 square miles (130.6 km^{2}) (or 99.43%) is land and 0.29 square miles (0.75 km^{2}) (or 0.57%) is water.

=== Cities, towns, villages ===
- Albers
- Damiansville
- New Baden (partial)

=== Unincorporated towns ===
- New Memphis
- New Memphis Station
- Wertenberg

(This list is based on USGS data and may include former settlements.)

=== Cemeteries ===
The township contains these four cemeteries: Green Mount, Harpstrite, New Baden and Saint Bernard.

=== Major highways ===
- Interstate 64
- Illinois Route 160
- Illinois Route 161
- Illinois Route 177

=== Airports and landing strips ===
- Fischers RLA Airport

=== Rivers ===
- Kaskaskia River

=== Lakes ===
- Broeckling Lake
- Cooper Lake
- Little Cooper Lake
- Long Lake
- Muskrat Lake
- Queens Lake

== Demographics ==
As of the 2020 census there were 6,447 people, 2,525 households, and 1,656 families residing in the township. The population density was 127.24 inhabitants per square mile (49.13/km^{2}). There were 2,498 housing units at an average density of 49.30 per square mile (19.03/km^{2}). The racial makeup of the township was 87.67% White, 1.49% African American, 0.39% Native American, 0.54% Asian, 0.03% Pacific Islander, 3.49% from other races, and 6.39% from two or more races. Hispanic or Latino of any race were 6.28% of the population.

There were 2,525 households, out of which 27.70% had children under the age of 18 living with them, 52.91% were married couples living together, 8.44% had a female householder with no spouse present, and 34.42% were non-families. 25.00% of all households were made up of individuals, and 8.00% had someone living alone who was 65 years of age or older. The average household size was 2.44 and the average family size was 2.98.

The township's age distribution consisted of 21.4% under the age of 18, 4.8% from 18 to 24, 23.7% from 25 to 44, 34% from 45 to 64, and 16.1% who were 65 years of age or older. The median age was 45.0 years. For every 100 females, there were 108.5 males. For every 100 females age 18 and over, there were 109.6 males.

The median income for a household in the township was $82,393, and the median income for a family was $97,321. Males had a median income of $53,375 versus $40,423 for females. The per capita income for the township was $40,622. About 5.8% of families and 7.0% of the population were below the poverty line, including 11.5% of those under age 18 and 1.1% of those age 65 or over.

Historical population
Census	Pop.	Note	%±
2010	6,354		—
2020	6,447		1.5%
U.S. Decennial Census

== School districts ==
- Wesclin Community Unit School District 3

== Political districts ==
- Illinois's 15th congressional district
- State House District 108
- State Senate District 54
