= Irishtown Township, Clinton County, Illinois =

Irishtown Township
- Township
- Location in Clinton County

- Clinton County's location in Illinois
- Coordinates: 38°41′24″N 89°18′37″W
- Country: United States
- State: Illinois
- County: Clinton
- Established: November 4, 1873

Area
  - Total: 37.13 sq mi (96.2 km^{2})
  - Land: 24.94 sq mi (64.6 km^{2})
  - Water: 12.19 sq mi (31.6 km^{2}) 32.83%
- Elevation: 472 ft (144 m)

Population (2020)
  - Total: 1,036
  - Density: 41.54/sq mi (16.04/km^{2})
- Time zone: UTC-6 (CST)
  - Summer (DST): UTC-5 (CDT)
- ZIP codes: 62231, 62246, 62253, 62283
- FIPS code: 17-027-37673

Irishtown Township is one of fifteen townships in Clinton County, Illinois, United States. As of the 2020 census, its population was 1,036 and it contained 730 housing units.

== Geography ==
According to the 2010 census, the township has a total area of 37.13 square miles (96.2 km^{2}), of which 24.94 square miles (64.6 km^{2}) (or 67.17%) is land and 12.19 square miles (31.6 km^{2}) (or 32.83%) is water.

=== Cities, towns, villages ===
- Keyesport (southwest half)

=== Unincorporated towns ===
- Harbor Light Bay
- Marydale
- North Harbor
- Panorama Hills

(This list is based on USGS data and may include former settlements.)

=== Cemeteries ===
The township contains these three cemeteries: Gillespie, Keyesport and McNeill.

=== Major highways ===
- Illinois Route 127

=== Airports and landing strips ===
- Carrillon Airport

=== Landmarks ===
- Eldon Hazlet State Recreation Area (north three-quarters)

== Demographics ==
As of the 2020 census there were 1,036 people, 370 households, and 250 families residing in the township. The population density was 27.51 inhabitants per square mile (10.62/km^{2}). There were 730 housing units at an average density of 19.39 per square mile (7.49/km^{2}). The racial makeup of the township was 94.11% White, 0.68% African American, 0.00% Native American, 0.29% Asian, 0.00% Pacific Islander, 0.77% from other races, and 4.15% from two or more races. Hispanic or Latino of any race were 1.06% of the population.

There were 370 households, out of which 18.90% had children under the age of 18 living with them, 54.86% were married couples living together, 7.84% had a female householder with no spouse present, and 32.43% were non-families. 30.00% of all households were made up of individuals, and 11.10% had someone living alone who was 65 years of age or older. The average household size was 2.21 and the average family size was 2.34.

The township's age distribution consisted of 14.0% under the age of 18, 2.9% from 18 to 24, 18.2% from 25 to 44, 31.6% from 45 to 64, and 33.3% who were 65 years of age or older. The median age was 50.6 years. For every 100 females, there were 124.8 males. For every 100 females age 18 and over, there were 117.3 males.

The median income for a household in the township was $42,011, and the median income for a family was $41,917. Males had a median income of $36,250 versus $35,179 for females. The per capita income for the township was $24,054. About 5.2% of families and 13.2% of the population were below the poverty line, including 40.0% of those under age 18 and 4.4% of those age 65 or over.

Historical population
| Census | Pop. | Note | %± |
|---|---|---|---|
| 2010 | 1,167 | | — |
| 2020 | 1,036 | | −11.2% |
U.S. Decennial Census

== School districts ==
- Carlyle Community Unit School District 1

== Political districts ==
- Illinois' 19th congressional district
- State House District 107
- State Senate District 54
