= Sugar Creek Township, Clinton County, Illinois =

Sugar Creek Township
- Township
- Location in Clinton County

- Clinton County's location in Illinois
- Coordinates: 38°36′56″N 89°39′08″W
- Country: United States
- State: Illinois
- County: Clinton
- Established: November 4, 1873

Area
  - Total: 36.57 sq mi (94.7 km^{2})
  - Land: 36.54 sq mi (94.6 km^{2})
  - Water: 0.03 sq mi (0.078 km^{2}) 0.08%
- Elevation: 482 ft (147 m)

Population (2020)
  - Total: 6,643
  - Density: 181.8/sq mi (70.19/km^{2})
- Time zone: UTC-6 (CST)
  - Summer (DST): UTC-5 (CDT)
- ZIP codes: 62216, 62230, 62245, 62293
- FIPS code: 17-027-73365

Sugar Creek Township is one of fifteen townships in Clinton County, Illinois, United States. As of the 2020 census, its population was 6,643 and it contained 2,720 housing units. The township's name changed from Trenton Township on June 1, 1874.

== Geography ==
According to the 2010 census, the township has a total area of 36.57 square miles (94.7 km^{2}), of which 36.54 square miles (94.6 km^{2}) (or 99.92%) is land and 0.03 square miles (0.078 km^{2}) (or 0.08%) is water.

=== Cities, towns, villages ===
- Aviston (vast majority)
- Trenton

=== Cemeteries ===
The township contains these three cemeteries: Saint Francis, Saint Marys and Trenton.

=== Major highways ===
- US Route 50
- Illinois Route 160

=== Lakes ===
- Sportsman Lake

=== Landmarks ===
- Cemetery

== Demographics ==
As of the 2020 census there were 6,643 people, 2,374 households, and 1,578 families residing in the township. The population density was 181.78 inhabitants per square mile (70.19/km^{2}). There were 2,720 housing units at an average density of 74.43 per square mile (28.74/km^{2}). The racial makeup of the township was 93.69% White, 0.51% African American, 0.47% Native American, 0.62% Asian, 0.03% Pacific Islander, 1.01% from other races, and 3.67% from two or more races. Hispanic or Latino of any race were 2.54% of the population.

There were 2,374 households, out of which 31.30% had children under the age of 18 living with them, 53.41% were married couples living together, 7.92% had a female householder with no spouse present, and 33.53% were non-families. 29.10% of all households were made up of individuals, and 15.10% had someone living alone who was 65 years of age or older. The average household size was 2.59 and the average family size was 3.22.

The township's age distribution consisted of 25.4% under the age of 18, 6.8% from 18 to 24, 27% from 25 to 44, 25.1% from 45 to 64, and 15.7% who were 65 years of age or older. The median age was 37.5 years. For every 100 females, there were 90.2 males. For every 100 females age 18 and over, there were 89.8 males.

The median income for a household in the township was $72,750, and the median income for a family was $102,821. Males had a median income of $52,813 versus $39,451 for females. The per capita income for the township was $37,103. About 2.2% of families and 4.7% of the population were below the poverty line, including 2.8% of those under age 18 and 11.0% of those age 65 or over.

Historical population
Census	Pop.	Note	%±
2010	6,184		—
2020	6,643		7.4%
U.S. Decennial Census

== School districts ==
- Aviston School District 21
- Wesclin Community Unit School District 3

== Political districts ==
- Illinois' 19th congressional district
- State House District 102
- State Senate District 51
