= Clement Township, Clinton County, Illinois =

Clement Township
- Township
- Location in Clinton County

- Clinton County's location in Illinois
- Coordinates: 38°36′37″N 89°17′35″W
- Country: United States
- State: Illinois
- County: Clinton
- Established: November 4, 1873

Area
  - Total: 25.86 sq mi (67.0 km^{2})
  - Land: 18.82 sq mi (48.7 km^{2})
  - Water: 7.04 sq mi (18.2 km^{2}) 27.22%
- Elevation: 456 ft (139 m)

Population (2020)
  - Total: 481
  - Density: 25.6/sq mi (9.87/km^{2})
- Time zone: UTC-6 (CST)
  - Summer (DST): UTC-5 (CDT)
- ZIP codes: 62231 62801
- FIPS code: 17-027-14884

Clement Township is one of fifteen townships in Clinton County, Illinois, USA. As of the 2020 census, its population was 481 and it contained 203 housing units. Clement Township was formed from Carlyle Township.

== Geography ==
According to the 2010 census, the township has a total area of 25.86 square miles (67.0 km^{2}), of which 18.82 square miles (48.7 km^{2}) (or 72.78%) is land and 7.04 square miles (18.2 km^{2}) (or 27.22%) is water.

=== Cities, towns, villages ===
- Huey

=== Cemeteries ===
The township contains these three cemeteries: Collins, Gerdes and Matsler.

=== Major highways ===
- US Route 50

=== Landmarks ===
- Eldon Hazlet State Recreation Area (southeast edge)
- South Shore State Park

== Demographics ==
As of the 2020 census there were 481 people, 143 households, and 91 families residing in the township. The population density was 18.93 inhabitants per square mile (7.31/km^{2}). There were 203 housing units at an average density of 7.99 per square mile (3.08/km^{2}). The racial makeup of the township was 93.76% White, 1.04% African American, 0.62% Native American, 0.21% Asian, 0.00% Pacific Islander, 1.04% from other races, and 3.33% from two or more races. Hispanic or Latino of any race were 1.25% of the population.

There were 143 households, out of which 19.60% had children under the age of 18 living with them, 60.14% were married couples living together, 2.80% had a female householder with no spouse present, and 36.36% were non-families. 21.70% of all households were made up of individuals, and 16.10% had someone living alone who was 65 years of age or older. The average household size was 2.13 and the average family size was 2.58.

The township's age distribution consisted of 16.8% under the age of 18, 4.3% from 18 to 24, 20.4% from 25 to 44, 33.9% from 45 to 64, and 24.7% who were 65 years of age or older. The median age was 52.8 years. For every 100 females, there were 77.8 males. For every 100 females age 18 and over, there were 80.7 males.

The median income for a household in the township was $53,438, and the median income for a family was $65,750. Males had a median income of $53,000 versus $25,208 for females. The per capita income for the township was $30,698. About 7.7% of families and 7.6% of the population were below the poverty line, including none of those under age 18 and 4.0% of those age 65 or over.

Historical population
| Census | Pop. | Note | %± |
|---|---|---|---|
| 2010 | 475 | | — |
| 2020 | 481 | | 1.3% |
U.S. Decennial Census

== School districts ==
- Carlyle Community Unit School District 1

== Political districts ==
- Illinois' 19th congressional district
- State House District 107
- State Senate District 54
