= Sandoval Township, Marion County, Illinois =

Sandoval Township
- Township

- Location of Illinois in the United States
- Coordinates: 38°36′N 89°7′W
- Country: United States
- State: Illinois
- County: Marion
- Settled: 1896

Area
  - Total: 17.6 sq mi (46 km^{2})
  - Land: 17.54 sq mi (45.4 km^{2})
  - Water: 0.06 sq mi (0.16 km^{2})
- Elevation: 492 ft (150 m)

Population (2010)
  - Estimate (2016): 2,202
  - Density: 132.4/sq mi (51.1/km^{2})
- Time zone: UTC-6 (CST)
  - Summer (DST): UTC-5 (CDT)
- FIPS code: 17-121-67457

Sandoval Township is located in Marion County, Illinois. As of the 2010 census, its population was 2,322 and it contained 1,005 housing units.

== Geography ==
Sandoval Township (W½ T2N R1E) is centered at 38°36'N 89°7'W (38.362, -89.068). It is transversed north–south by U.S. Route 51 and east–west by U.S. Route 50. The city of Sandoval is located in the center of the township and Junction City is located in the southern part. According to the 2010 census, the township has a total area of 17.6 square miles (46 km^{2}), of which 17.54 square miles (45.4 km^{2}) (or 99.66%) is land and 0.06 square miles (0.16 km^{2}) (or 0.34%) is water.

In 1896, Sandoval Township was created from the western half of Odin Township.

== Demographics ==
Historical population
| Census | Pop. | Note | %± |
|---|---|---|---|
| 2016 (est.) | 2,202 |
U.S. Decennial Census

== Adjacent townships ==
- Carrigan Township (north and northeast)
- Odin Township (east)
- Centralia Township (southeast and south)
- Brookside Township, Clinton County (southwest)
- Meridian Township, Clinton County (west)
- East Fork Township, Clinton County (northwest)
