= Panorama Hills, Illinois =

- Unincorporated community
- Location within Illinois Location within the United States
- Coordinates: 38°43′03″N 89°17′24″W
- Country: United States
- State: Illinois
- County: Clinton
- Elevation: 509 ft (155 m)
- Time zone: UTC-6 (Central (CST))
  - Summer (DST): UTC-5 (CDT)
- Area code: 618
- GNIS feature ID: 1810449

Panorama Hills is an unincorporated community in Clinton County, Illinois, United States. Panorama Hills is located on the western shore of Carlyle Lake 2 miles (3.2 km) south-southwest of Keyesport.
