= New Memphis Station, Illinois =

- Unincorporated community
- Location within Illinois Location within the United States
- Coordinates: 38°27′29″N 89°40′36″W
- Country: United States
- State: Illinois
- County: Clinton
- Elevation: 410 ft (120 m)
- Time zone: UTC-6 (Central (CST))
  - Summer (DST): UTC-5 (CDT)
- Area code: 618
- GNIS feature ID: 414446

New Memphis Station is an unincorporated community in Clinton County, Illinois, United States. New Memphis Station is located along Illinois Route 160 and Illinois Route 177 7 miles (11 km) southeast of Mascoutah.
