= Junction City, Illinois =

- Village
- Location in Marion County, Illinois
- Coordinates: 38°34′38″N 89°07′25″W
- Country: United States
- State: Illinois
- County: Marion
- Township: Sandoval

Area
  - Total: 0.70 sq mi (1.82 km^{2})
  - Land: 0.68 sq mi (1.77 km^{2})
  - Water: 0.019 sq mi (0.05 km^{2})
- Elevation: 492 ft (150 m)

Population (2020)
  - Total: 527
  - Density: 770.5/sq mi (297.51/km^{2})
- Time zone: UTC-6 (CST)
  - Summer (DST): UTC-5 (CDT)
- ZIP code: 62882 (Sandoval)
- Area code: 618
- FIPS code: 17-38791
- GNIS ID: 2398316

Junction City is a village in Marion County, Illinois, United States. The population was 527 at the 2020 census.

== Geography ==
Junction City is located in western Marion County 3 miles (5 km) south of Sandoval, 4 miles (6 km) north of Centralia, and 12 miles (19 km) west-southwest of Salem, the county seat.

According to the U.S. Census Bureau, Junction City has a total area of 0.70 square miles (1.81 km^{2}), of which 0.02 square miles (0.05 km^{2}), or 2.56%, are water. The village drains south to tributaries of Crooked Creek, a west-flowing tributary of the Kaskaskia River.

== Demographics ==
Historical population
Census	Pop.	Note	%±
1920	457		—
1930	308		−32.6%
1940	332		7.8%
1950	353		6.3%
1960	315		−10.8%
1970	305		−3.2%
1980	456		49.5%
1990	539		18.2%
2000	559		3.7%
2010	482		−13.8%
2020	527		9.3%
U.S. Decennial Census

As of the census of 2000, there were 559 people, 207 households, and 158 families residing in the village. The population density was 827.9 inhabitants per square mile (319.7/km^{2}). There were 226 housing units at an average density of 334.7 per square mile (129.2/km^{2}). The racial makeup of the village was 98.57% White, 0.36% Asian, and 1.07% from two or more races. Hispanic or Latino of any race were 0.36% of the population.

There were 207 households, out of which 45.4% had children under the age of 18 living with them, 58.0% were married couples living together, 13.0% had a female householder with no husband present, and 23.2% were non-families. 20.3% of all households were made up of individuals, and 11.6% had someone living alone who was 65 years of age or older. The average household size was 2.70 and the average family size was 3.11.

In the village, the population was spread out, with 31.1% under the age of 18, 7.7% from 18 to 24, 28.6% from 25 to 44, 21.5% from 45 to 64, and 11.1% who were 65 years of age or older. The median age was 33 years. For every 100 females, there were 96.8 males. For every 100 females age 18 and over, there were 93.5 males.

The median income for a household in the village was $33,500, and the median income for a family was $40,000. Males had a median income of $31,538 versus $21,719 for females. The per capita income for the village was $14,114. About 10.9% of families and 9.9% of the population were below the poverty line, including 11.2% of those under age 18 and 15.7% of those age 65 or over.
