= Germantown Township, Clinton County, Illinois =

Germantown Township
- Township
- Location in Clinton County

- Clinton County's location in Illinois
- Coordinates: 38°31′04″N 89°32′23″W
- Country: United States
- State: Illinois
- County: Clinton
- Established: November 4, 1873

Area
  - Total: 38.65 sq mi (100.1 km^{2})
  - Land: 38.31 sq mi (99.2 km^{2})
  - Water: 0.34 sq mi (0.88 km^{2}) 0.88%
- Elevation: 413 ft (126 m)

Population (2020)
  - Total: 2,084
  - Density: 54.40/sq mi (21.00/km^{2})
- Time zone: UTC-6 (CST)
  - Summer (DST): UTC-5 (CDT)
- ZIP codes: 62215, 62218, 62230, 62231, 62245, 62271
- FIPS code: 17-027-29054

Germantown Township is one of fifteen townships in Clinton County, Illinois, USA. As of the 2020 census, its population was 2,084 and it contained 853 housing units.

== Geography ==
According to the 2010 census, the township has a total area of 38.65 square miles (100.1 km^{2}), of which 38.31 square miles (99.2 km^{2}) (or 99.12%) is land and 0.34 square miles (0.88 km^{2}) (or 0.88%) is water.

=== Cities, towns, villages ===
- Germantown

=== Cemeteries ===
The township contains these two cemeteries: Ammons and Saint Boniface.

=== Major highways ===
- Interstate 64
- Illinois Route 161

=== Lakes ===
- Buddes Lake
- Clear Lake
- Foppe Lake
- Grass Lake
- Horstmann Lake
- Moody Lake
- Olges Lake
- Round Lake
- Wilkins Lake

== Demographics ==
As of the 2020 census there were 2,084 people, 887 households, and 593 families residing in the township. The population density was 53.94 inhabitants per square mile (20.83/km^{2}). There were 853 housing units at an average density of 22.08 per square mile (8.53/km^{2}). The racial makeup of the township was 95.06% White, 0.14% African American, 0.24% Native American, 0.00% Asian, 0.00% Pacific Islander, 1.34% from other races, and 3.21% from two or more races. Hispanic or Latino of any race were 2.98% of the population.

There were 887 households, out of which 33.70% had children under the age of 18 living with them, 52.09% were married couples living together, 9.24% had a female householder with no spouse present, and 33.15% were non-families. 26.40% of all households were made up of individuals, and 16.90% had someone living alone who was 65 years of age or older. The average household size was 2.53 and the average family size was 3.12.

The township's age distribution consisted of 26.3% under the age of 18, 6.6% from 18 to 24, 25.4% from 25 to 44, 24.3% from 45 to 64, and 17.5% who were 65 years of age or older. The median age was 40.0 years. For every 100 females, there were 97.5 males. For every 100 females age 18 and over, there were 91.7 males.

The median income for a household in the township was $72,063, and the median income for a family was $86,563. Males had a median income of $48,824 versus $41,635 for females. The per capita income for the township was $32,741. About 6.1% of families and 7.2% of the population were below the poverty line, including 9.1% of those under age 18 and 12.2% of those age 65 or over.

Historical population
Census	Pop.	Note	%±
2010	2,070		—
2020	2,084		0.7%
U.S. Decennial Census

== Political districts ==
- Illinois' 19th congressional district
- State House District 107
- State Senate District 54
