= Boulder, Illinois =

- Unincorporated community
- Location within Illinois Location within the United States
- Coordinates: 38°41′48″N 89°13′32″W
- Country: United States
- State: Illinois
- County: Clinton
- Elevation: 466 ft (142 m)
- Time zone: UTC-6 (Central (CST))
  - Summer (DST): UTC-5 (CDT)
- Area code: 618
- GNIS feature ID: 404717

Boulder is an unincorporated community in Clinton County, Illinois, United States. Boulder is located on the eastern shore of Carlyle Lake; a railroad line crosses the lake from Boulder to Keyesport.
