= Wheatfield Township, Clinton County, Illinois =

Wheatfield Township
- Township
- Location in Clinton County

- Clinton County's location in Illinois
- Coordinates: 38°41′38″N 89°25′40″W
- Country: United States
- State: Illinois
- County: Clinton
- Established: November 4, 1873

Area
  - Total: 35.42 sq mi (91.7 km^{2})
  - Land: 35.42 sq mi (91.7 km^{2})
  - Water: 0 sq mi (0 km^{2}) 0%
- Elevation: 446 ft (136 m)

Population (2020)
  - Total: 438
  - Density: 12.4/sq mi (4.77/km^{2})
- Time zone: UTC-6 (CST)
  - Summer (DST): UTC-5 (CDT)
- ZIP code: 62231
- FIPS code: 17-027-80996

Wheatfield Township is one of fifteen townships in Clinton County, Illinois, USA. As of the 2020 census, its population was 438 and it contained 201 housing units.

== Geography ==
According to the 2010 census, the township has a total area of 35.42 square miles (91.7 km^{2}), all land.

=== Unincorporated towns ===
- Stolletown

(This list is based on USGS data and may include former settlements.)

=== Cemeteries ===
The township contains these four cemeteries: Rudolph, Saint Felicitas, Saint Peter and Yingst.

== Demographics ==
As of the 2020 census there were 438 people, 87 households, and 87 families residing in the township. The population density was 12.37 inhabitants per square mile (4.78/km^{2}). There were 201 housing units at an average density of 5.68 per square mile (2.19/km^{2}). The racial makeup of the township was 95.21% White, 0.23% African American, 0.00% Native American, 0.23% Asian, 0.00% Pacific Islander, 0.91% from other races, and 3.42% from two or more races. Hispanic or Latino of any race were 1.60% of the population.

There were 87 households, out of which 21.80% had children under the age of 18 living with them, 67.82% were married couples living together, 27.59% had a female householder with no spouse present, and none were non-families. No households were made up of individuals. The average household size was 3.39 and the average family size was 3.33.

The township's age distribution consisted of 14.9% under the age of 18, 20.3% from 18 to 24, 20.3% from 25 to 44, 25.3% from 45 to 64, and 19.0% who were 65 years of age or older. The median age was 40.3 years. For every 100 females, there were 89.1 males. For every 100 females age 18 and over, there were 85.9 males.

The median income for a household in the township was $98,750, and the median income for a family was $98,750. Males had a median income of $48,125 versus $25,909 for females. The per capita income for the township was $33,748. None of the population was below the poverty line.

Historical population
Census	Pop.	Note	%±
2010	478		—
2020	438		−8.4%
U.S. Decennial Census

== School districts ==
- Carlyle Community Unit School District 1
- Breese District 12
- Central Community High School

== Political districts ==
- Illinois' 19th congressional district
- State House District 102
- State Senate District 51
