= Meridian Township, Clinton County, Illinois =

Meridian Township
- Township
- Location in Clinton County

- Clinton County's location in Illinois
- Coordinates: 38°38′00″N 89°12′00″W
- Country: United States
- State: Illinois
- County: Clinton
- Established: November 4, 1873

Area
  - Total: 36.89 sq mi (95.5 km^{2})
  - Land: 36.82 sq mi (95.4 km^{2})
  - Water: 0.07 sq mi (0.18 km^{2}) 0.19%
- Elevation: 479 ft (146 m)

Population (2020)
  - Total: 471
  - Density: 12.8/sq mi (4.94/km^{2})
- Time zone: UTC-6 (CST)
  - Summer (DST): UTC-5 (CDT)
- ZIP codes: 62231, 62283 62801, 62882
- FIPS code: 17-027-48476

Meridian Township is one of fifteen townships in Clinton County, Illinois, United States. As of the 2020 census, its population was 471 and it contained 237 housing units.

== Geography ==
According to the 2010 census, the township has a total area of 36.89 square miles (95.5 km^{2}), of which 36.82 square miles (95.4 km^{2}) (or 99.81%) is land and 0.07 square miles (0.18 km^{2}) (or 0.19%) is water.

=== Unincorporated towns ===
- Ferrin
- Shattuc

(This list is based on USGS data and may include former settlements.)

=== Cemeteries ===
The township contains two cemeteries: Bethlehem Lutheran and Stacey.

=== Major highways ===
- US Route 50

== Demographics ==
As of the 2020 census there were 471 people, 232 households, and 124 families residing in the township. The population density was 12.78 inhabitants per square mile (4.93/km^{2}). There were 237 housing units at an average density of 6.43 per square mile (2.48/km^{2}). The racial makeup of the township was 93.84% White, 0.21% African American, 0.64% Native American, 0.42% Asian, 0.00% Pacific Islander, 0.00% from other races, and 4.88% from two or more races. Hispanic or Latino of any race were 0.00% of the population.

There were 232 households, out of which 25.90% had children under the age of 18 living with them, 42.24% were married couples living together, 0.00% had a female householder with no spouse present, and 46.55% were non-families. 39.20% of all households were made up of individuals, and 19.80% had someone living alone who was 65 years of age or older. The average household size was 2.24 and the average family size was 3.05.

The township's age distribution consisted of 20.4% under the age of 18, 7.1% from 18 to 24, 25.5% from 25 to 44, 30.3% from 45 to 64, and 16.8% who were 65 years of age or older. The median age was 39.9 years. For every 100 females, there were 118.1 males. For every 100 females age 18 and over, there were 114.0 males.

The median income for a household in the township was $61,389, and the median income for a family was $68,906. Males had a median income of $44,583 versus $31,250 for females. The per capita income for the township was $29,535. About 10.5% of families and 11.8% of the population were below the poverty line, including 14.2% of those under age 18 and 5.7% of those age 65 or over.

Historical population
Census	Pop.	Note	%±
2010	547		—
2020	471		−13.9%
U.S. Decennial Census

== School districts ==
- Carlyle Community Unit School District 1
- Sandoval Community Unit School District 501

== Political districts ==
- Illinois's 19th congressional district
- State House District 108
- State Senate District 54
