= Breese Township, Clinton County, Illinois =

Breese Township
- Township
- Location in Clinton County

- Clinton County's location in Illinois
- Coordinates: 38°36′38″N 89°32′09″W
- Country: United States
- State: Illinois
- County: Clinton
- Established: November 4, 1873

Area
  - Total: 37.43 sq mi (96.9 km^{2})
  - Land: 37.41 sq mi (96.9 km^{2})
  - Water: 0.03 sq mi (0.078 km^{2}) 0.08%
- Elevation: 456 ft (139 m)

Population (2020)
  - Total: 5,594
  - Density: 149.5/sq mi (57.73/km^{2})
- Time zone: UTC-6 (CST)
  - Summer (DST): UTC-5 (CDT)
- ZIP codes: 62216, 62230, 62231, 62245, 62293
- FIPS code: 17-027-07926

Breese Township is one of fifteen townships in Clinton County, Illinois, USA. As of the 2020 census, its population was 5,594 and it contained 2,410 housing units.

== Geography ==
According to the 2010 census, the township has a total area of 37.43 square miles (96.9 km^{2}), of which 37.41 square miles (96.9 km^{2}) (or 99.95%) is land and 0.03 square miles (0.078 km^{2}) (or 0.08%) is water.

=== Cities, towns, villages ===
- Aviston (east edge)
- Breese

=== Unincorporated towns ===
- Snearlyville

=== Cemeteries ===
- Lake Branch
- Saint Dominic
- Saint John

=== Major highways ===
- US Route 50

=== Airports and landing strips ===
- Dennis Meier Heliport
- Saint Josephs Hospital Heliport

== Demographics ==
As of the 2020 census there were 5,594 people, 2,354 households, and 1,509 families residing in the township. The population density was 149.54 inhabitants per square mile (57.74/km^{2}). There were 2,410 housing units at an average density of 64.42 per square mile (24.87/km^{2}). The racial makeup of the township was 93.90% White, 0.20% African American, 0.13% Native American, 0.30% Asian, 0.00% Pacific Islander, 2.40% from other races, and 3.07% from two or more races. Hispanic or Latino of any race were 3.79% of the population.

There were 2,354 households, out of which 26.30% had children under the age of 18 living with them, 55.86% were married couples living together, 5.06% had a female householder with no spouse present, and 35.90% were non-families. 30.70% of all households were made up of individuals, and 16.20% had someone living alone who was 65 years of age or older. The average household size was 2.29 and the average family size was 2.90.

The township's age distribution consisted of 23.3% under the age of 18, 5.4% from 18 to 24, 27.8% from 25 to 44, 24.9% from 45 to 64, and 18.7% who were 65 years of age or older. The median age was 39.2 years. For every 100 females, there were 100.1 males. For every 100 females age 18 and over, there were 84.2 males.

The median income for a household in the township was $72,439, and the median income for a family was $90,646. Males had a median income of $50,821 versus $25,816 for females. The per capita income for the township was $41,323. About 1.4% of families and 4.4% of the population were below the poverty line, including 0.6% of those under age 18 and 6.9% of those age 65 or over.

Historical population
Census	Pop.	Note	%±
2010	5,417		—
2020	5,594		3.3%
US Decennial Census

== Political districts ==
- Illinois's 19th congressional district
- State House District 107
- State Senate District 54
