= Lake Township, Illinois =

Lake Township, Illinois may refer to:

- Lake Township, Clinton County, Illinois
- Lake Township, Cook County, Illinois, also known as the Town of Lake, annexed to Chicago in 1889
