= Clement Township =

Clement Township may refer to the following places in the United States:

- Clement Township, Clinton County, Illinois
- Clement Township, Michigan
