= East Fork Township, Clinton County, Illinois =

East Fork Township
- Township
- Location in Clinton County

- Clinton County's location in Illinois
- Coordinates: 38°41′57″N 89°11′49″W
- Country: United States
- State: Illinois
- County: Clinton
- Established: November 4, 1873

Area
  - Total: 37.62 sq mi (97.4 km^{2})
  - Land: 31.58 sq mi (81.8 km^{2})
  - Water: 6.04 sq mi (15.6 km^{2}) 16.06%
- Elevation: 476 ft (145 m)

Population (2020)
  - Total: 365
  - Density: 11.6/sq mi (4.46/km^{2})
- Time zone: UTC-6 (CST)
  - Summer (DST): UTC-5 (CDT)
- ZIP codes: 62231, 62253, 62283 62882
- FIPS code: 17-027-21748

East Fork Township is one of fifteen townships in Clinton County, Illinois, USA. As of the 2020 census, its population was 365 and it contained 227 housing units. Its name changed to Morris on June 1, 1874 and then back to East Fork.

== Geography ==
According to the 2010 census, the township has a total area of 37.62 square miles (97.4 km^{2}), of which 31.58 square miles (81.8 km^{2}) (or 83.94%) is land and 6.04 square miles (15.6 km^{2}) (or 16.06%) is water.

=== Unincorporated towns ===
- Boulder

(This list is based on USGS data and may include former settlements.)

=== Cemeteries ===
The township contains these eight cemeteries: Brewster, Clark, Ebenezer, Hawkins, New Carter, Old Carter, Prairie Chapel and Prichett.

=== Rivers ===
- North Fork Kaskaskia River

== Demographics ==
As of the 2020 census there were 365 people, 199 households, and 138 families residing in the township. The population density was 9.72 inhabitants per square mile (3.75/km^{2}). There were 227 housing units at an average density of 6.05 per square mile (2.34/km^{2}). The racial makeup of the township was 96.16% White, 0.27% African American, 0.00% Native American, 0.00% Asian, 0.27% Pacific Islander, 0.00% from other races, and 3.29% from two or more races. Hispanic or Latino of any race were 1.64% of the population.

There were 199 households, out of which 13.60% had children under the age of 18 living with them, 57.29% were married couples living together, 1.51% had a female householder with no spouse present, and 30.65% were non-families. 30.70% of all households were made up of individuals, and 16.60% had someone living alone who was 65 years of age or older. The average household size was 1.94 and the average family size was 2.36.

The township's age distribution consisted of 8.3% under the age of 18, 4.9% from 18 to 24, 12.5% from 25 to 44, 45.6% from 45 to 64, and 28.9% who were 65 years of age or older. The median age was 54.9 years. For every 100 females, there were 109.2 males. For every 100 females age 18 and over, there were 123.3 males.

The median income for a household in the township was $57,708, and the median income for a family was $68,750. Males had a median income of $50,909 versus $43,646 for females. The per capita income for the township was $32,152. About 2.2% of families and 6.7% of the population were below the poverty line, including 12.5% of those under age 18 and none of those age 65 or over.

Historical population
Census	Pop.	Note	%±
2010	400		—
2020	365		−8.7%
U.S. Decennial Census

== School districts ==
- Carlyle Community Unit School District 1
- Patoka Community Unit School District 100
- Sandoval Community Unit School District 501

== Political districts ==
- Illinois' 19th congressional district
- State House District 107
- State Senate District 54
