= Wilbur Clark =

American casino owner and land developer

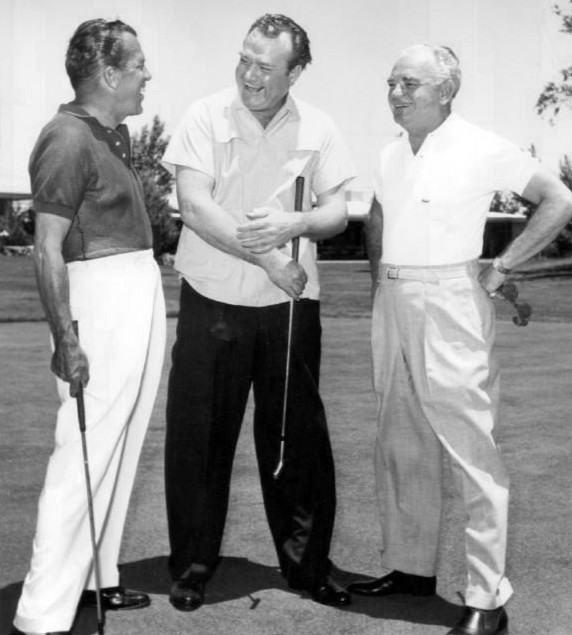
- Ed Sullivan, Red Skelton and Wilbur Clark on the Desert Inn hotel's golf course, 1959
- Born: December 27, 1908; Keyesport, Illinois
- Died: August 27, 1965 (aged 56)
- Occupation: Businessman
- Spouse: Toni Clark
- Parent(s): Shirley Clark; Lulu Clark

Wilbur Clark (December 27, 1908 – August 27, 1965) was an American casino owner and land developer in Las Vegas, Nevada.

== Early life ==
Wilbur Clark was born on December 27, 1908, in Keyesport, Illinois. His parents were Shirley and Lulu Clark.

== Career ==
Clark moved to San Diego, California, at age 19, and worked in a hotel. He also worked on gambling ships, where gambling could take place in international waters.

He purchased El Rancho Vegas in 1944. A year later, in 1945, he purchased Monte Carlo Club. In 1946, he sold El Rancho Vegas. With that money, he built the Desert Inn casino in 1947. However, he quickly sold most of his interest to businessman Moe Dalitz, owning only 17.5%. Another business partner was Hank Greenspun, the publisher of the Las Vegas Sun newspaper. He remained the public face of the Desert Inn. In the 1950s, he organized the Tournament of Champions, an annual golf tournament at the Desert Inn Golf Course, televised by NBC. He sold his share in 1964.

Due to his business relationships with gangsters, Clark testified before the US Senate's Kefauver Committee in 1951. In Cuba, the Meyer Lansky-owned Hotel Nacional opened its casino in December 1955, to be headed by Clark.

During his time as head of the Desert Inn, Clark had a charity called 'Wilbur Clark's Cavalcade of Charities.' In 1964, as part of the charity, he helped organize the first ever professional football game in Las Vegas, an American Football League preseason game between the then Oakland Raiders and Houston Oilers. The game helped establish a relationship between the Raiders's Al Davis and Las Vegas. That relationship between the Davis family and Las Vegas was eventually a motivating factor in his son Mark Davis relocating the team to the Las Vegas Area in 2020 as the Las Vegas Raiders.

Later, he developed Wilbur Clark's Paradise Gardens, located at 4505 South Maryland Parkway, south of the Thomas & Mack Center. He donated the land on which Guardian Angel Cathedral was built.

== Personal life and death ==
He married Toni Clark, born Lena Gaglionese, in 1944. She became a philanthropist and fashion icon, supporting the Las Vegas Philharmonic Orchestra and Nevada Ballet Theatre. In 1958, she was on the Fashion Foundation of America's 10 Best Dressed Women in America list. She died in 2006.

Clark died of a heart attack on August 27, 1965.

== Legacy ==
The Wilbur Clark D.I. Road (previously known as the Desert Inn Road) in Las Vegas, Nevada, is named in his honor.

Whilst Dr. Heywood Floyd is en route to the moon in Stanley Kubrick's film 2001: A Space Odyssey during the wait over at the orbiting wheel in space, there is a sign for "Howard Johnson's Earthlight Rooms".
