= Shattuc, Illinois =

- Village
- Location within Illinois Location within the United States
- Coordinates: 38°36′38″N 89°11′34″W
- Country: United States
- State: Illinois
- County: Clinton
- Elevation: 476 ft (145 m)
- Time zone: UTC-6 (Central (CST))
  - Summer (DST): UTC-5 (CDT)
- Area code: 618
- GNIS feature ID: 418300

Shattuc is a village in Clinton County, Illinois, United States. It is located along a railroad line four miles west of Sandoval. Shattuc once had a post office, which closed on September 28, 2002.

Schools:

Shattuc children are bused to and from the Carlyle Community School system, located in Carlyle, Illinois.
