= Albers, Illinois =

- Village
- Interactive map of Albers, Illinois
- Coordinates: 38°32′18″N 89°37′32″W
- Country: United States
- State: Illinois
- County: Clinton

Government
  - Village president: Stephen H Schomaker

Area
  - Total: 0.99 sq mi (2.57 km^{2})
  - Land: 0.99 sq mi (2.57 km^{2})
  - Water: 0 sq mi (0.00 km^{2})
- Elevation: 440 ft (130 m)

Population (2020)
  - Total: 1,121
  - Density: 1,130.0/sq mi (436.29/km^{2})
- Time zone: UTC-6 (CST)
  - Summer (DST): UTC-5 (CDT)
- ZIP code: 62215
- Area code: 618
- FIPS code: 17-00555
- GNIS feature ID: 2397924
- Website: albersil.org

Albers is a village in Clinton County, Illinois, United States. The population was 1,121 at the 2020 census.

== History ==
Albers had its start in the 1860s when the railroad was extended to that point.

== Geography ==
Albers is located in western Clinton County. Illinois Route 161 runs through the village, leading east 27 miles (43 km) to Centralia and west 6 miles (10 km) to Interstate 64, which leads 28 miles (45 km) farther west to St. Louis. I-64 eastbound can be reached 3 miles (5 km) south of Albers in the village of Damiansville.

According to the 2021 census gazetteer files, Albers has a total area of 0.85 square miles (2.20 km^{2}), all land.

== Demographics ==
Historical population
Census	Pop.	Note	%±
1960	566		—
1970	656		15.9%
1980	663		1.1%
1990	700		5.6%
2000	878		25.4%
2010	1,190		35.5%
2020	1,121		−5.8%
U.S. Decennial Census

=== 2020 census ===
As of the 2020 census, Albers had a population of 1,121. The population density was 1,325.06 inhabitants per square mile (511.61/km^{2}), and there were 423 housing units at an average density of 500.00 per square mile (193.05/km^{2}).

The median age was 38.2 years. 27.5% of residents were under the age of 18 and 12.8% of residents were 65 years of age or older. For every 100 females there were 108.0 males, and for every 100 females age 18 and over there were 103.2 males age 18 and over.

0.0% of residents lived in urban areas, while 100.0% lived in rural areas.

There were 404 households in Albers, of which 38.6% had children under the age of 18 living in them. Of all households, 65.8% were married-couple households, 11.6% were households with a male householder and no spouse or partner present, and 15.6% were households with a female householder and no spouse or partner present. About 19.1% of all households were made up of individuals and 10.6% had someone living alone who was 65 years of age or older.

There were 423 housing units, of which 4.5% were vacant. The homeowner vacancy rate was 1.2% and the rental vacancy rate was 4.2%.

Racial composition as of the 2020 census
Race	Number	Percent
White	1,045	93.2%
Black or African American	1	0.1%
American Indian and Alaska Native	0	0.0%
Asian	3	0.3%
Native Hawaiian and Other Pacific Islander	0	0.0%
Some other race	32	2.9%
Two or more races	40	3.6%
Hispanic or Latino (of any race)	55	4.9%

=== Income and poverty ===
The median income for a household in the village was $94,375, and the median income for a family was $99,441. Males had a median income of $44,412 versus $40,758 for females. The per capita income for the village was $34,104. About 15.0% of families and 13.7% of the population were below the poverty line, including 25.5% of those under age 18 and 1.8% of those age 65 or over.

== Education ==
- Central Community High School - Formed as a consolidation of the Breese and Aviston high schools in 1971
