= Carlyle Township, Clinton County, Illinois =

Carlyle Township
- Township
- Location in Clinton County

- Clinton County's location in Illinois
- Coordinates: 38°36′35″N 89°21′32″W
- Country: United States
- State: Illinois
- County: Clinton
- Established: November 4, 1873

Area
  - Total: 20.67 sq mi (53.5 km^{2})
  - Land: 17.83 sq mi (46.2 km^{2})
  - Water: 2.84 sq mi (7.4 km^{2}) 13.74%
- Elevation: 449 ft (137 m)

Population (2020)
  - Total: 3,842
  - Density: 215.5/sq mi (83.20/km^{2})
- Time zone: UTC-6 (CST)
  - Summer (DST): UTC-5 (CDT)
- ZIP codes: 62231
- FIPS code: 17-027-11241

Carlyle Township is one of fifteen townships in Clinton County, Illinois, United States. As of the 2020 census, its population was 3,842 and it contained 1,764 housing units.

== Geography ==
According to the 2010 census, the township has a total area of 20.67 square miles (53.5 km^{2}), of which 17.83 square miles (46.2 km^{2}) (or 86.26%) is land and 2.84 square miles (7.4 km^{2}) (or 13.74%) is water.

=== Cities, towns, villages ===
- Carlyle (vast majority)

=== Cemeteries ===
The township contains these cemeteries: Carlyle City Cemetery, Club Lake Grave Yard, Golder Grave Yard, Luebbers Grave Yard (now flooded), McAllister Grave Yard, Poor Farm Cemetery and St. Mary's Catholic Cemetery.

=== Major highways ===
- US Route 50
- Illinois Route 127

=== Rivers ===
- Kaskaskia River

=== Lakes ===
- Carlyle Lake
- Horseshoe Lake

=== Landmarks ===
- Clinton County Fairgrounds
- Eldon Hazlet State Recreation Area
- Royal Lake Resort (northeast quarter)

== Demographics ==
As of the 2020 census there were 3,842 people, 1,577 households, and 1,123 families residing in the township. The population density was 186.03 inhabitants per square mile (71.83/km^{2}). There were 1,764 housing units at an average density of 85.41 per square mile (32.98/km^{2}). The racial makeup of the township was 89.12% White, 3.80% African American, 0.39% Native American, 0.86% Asian, 0.00% Pacific Islander, 0.68% from other races, and 5.15% from two or more races. Hispanic or Latino of any race were 1.98% of the population.

There were 1,577 households, out of which 31.30% had children under the age of 18 living with them, 48.64% were married couples living together, 18.20% had a female householder with no spouse present, and 28.79% were non-families. 25.70% of all households were made up of individuals, and 10.50% had someone living alone who was 65 years of age or older. The average household size was 2.30 and the average family size was 2.68.

The township's age distribution consisted of 16.6% under the age of 18, 17.2% from 18 to 24, 23.1% from 25 to 44, 25.6% from 45 to 64, and 17.6% who were 65 years of age or older. The median age was 36.7 years. For every 100 females, there were 93.8 males. For every 100 females age 18 and over, there were 86.9 males.

The median income for a household in the township was $54,521, and the median income for a family was $70,650. Males had a median income of $28,563 versus $28,468 for females. The per capita income for the township was $28,066. About 10.1% of families and 10.7% of the population were below the poverty line, including 10.1% of those under age 18 and 25.6% of those age 65 or over.

Historical population
Census	Pop.	Note	%±
2010	3,932		—
2020	3,842		−2.3%
U.S. Decennial Census

== School districts ==
- Carlyle Community Unit School District 1

== Political districts ==
- Illinois' 19th congressional district
- State House District 107
- State Senate District 54
