= Saint Rose Township, Clinton County, Illinois =

Saint Rose Township
- Township
- Location in Clinton County

- Clinton County's location in Illinois
- Coordinates: 38°41′51″N 89°31′54″W
- Country: United States
- State: Illinois
- County: Clinton
- Established: November 4, 1873

Area
  - Total: 37.51 sq mi (97.2 km^{2})
  - Land: 37.49 sq mi (97.1 km^{2})
  - Water: 0.01 sq mi (0.026 km^{2}) 0.03%
- Elevation: 495 ft (151 m)

Population (2020)
  - Total: 1,422
  - Density: 37.93/sq mi (14.64/km^{2})
- Time zone: UTC-6 (CST)
  - Summer (DST): UTC-5 (CDT)
- ZIP codes: 62230, 62231, 62249, 62275, 62293
- FIPS code: 17-027-67171

Saint Rose Township is one of fifteen townships in Clinton County, Illinois, USA. As of the 2020 census, its population was 1,422 and it contained 566 housing units.

== Geography ==
According to the 2010 census, the township has a total area of 37.51 square miles (97.2 km^{2}), of which 37.49 square miles (97.1 km^{2}) (or 99.95%) is land and 0.01 square miles (0.026 km^{2}) (or 0.03%) is water.

== Demographics ==
As of the 2020 census there were 1,422 people, 586 households, and 449 families residing in the township. The population density was 37.90 inhabitants per square mile (14.63/km^{2}). There were 566 housing units at an average density of 15.08 per square mile (5.82/km^{2}). The racial makeup of the township was 95.92% White, 0.21% African American, 0.21% Native American, 0.00% Asian, 0.00% Pacific Islander, 1.34% from other races, and 2.32% from two or more races. Hispanic or Latino of any race were 1.90% of the population.

There were 586 households, out of which 30.40% had children under the age of 18 living with them, 67.06% were married couples living together, 5.12% had a female householder with no spouse present, and 23.38% were non-families. 21.70% of all households were made up of individuals, and 12.80% had someone living alone who was 65 years of age or older. The average household size was 2.77 and the average family size was 3.27.

The township's age distribution consisted of 24.6% under the age of 18, 8.0% from 18 to 24, 20.3% from 25 to 44, 31.7% from 45 to 64, and 15.4% who were 65 years of age or older. The median age was 42.0 years. For every 100 females, there were 94.1 males. For every 100 females age 18 and over, there were 108.9 males.

The median income for a household in the township was $86,875, and the median income for a family was $100,265. Males had a median income of $52,188 versus $36,357 for females. The per capita income for the township was $35,090. About 2.9% of families and 2.8% of the population were below the poverty line, including 0.5% of those under age 18 and 5.6% of those age 65 or over.

Historical population
Census	Pop.	Note	%±
2010	1,422		—
2020	1,422		0.0%
U.S. Decennial Census

== Political districts ==
- Illinois's 19th congressional district
- State House District 102
- State Senate District 51
