= Lake Township, Clinton County, Illinois =

Lake Township
- Township
- Location in Clinton County

- Clinton County's location in Illinois
- Coordinates: 38°32′13″N 89°19′26″W
- Country: United States
- State: Illinois
- County: Clinton

Area
  - Total: 29.93 sq mi (77.5 km^{2})
  - Land: 29.8 sq mi (77 km^{2})
  - Water: 0.13 sq mi (0.34 km^{2}) 0.43%
- Elevation: 423 ft (129 m)

Population (2020)
  - Total: 812
  - Density: 27.2/sq mi (10.5/km^{2})
- Time zone: UTC-6 (CST)
  - Summer (DST): UTC-5 (CDT)
- ZIP codes: 62231, 62250, 62801
- FIPS code: 17-027-40871

Lake Township is one of fifteen townships in Clinton County, Illinois, USA. As of the 2020 census, its population was 812 and it contained 373 housing units. Lake Township was formed from part of Crooked Creek (Brookside) Township.

== Geography ==
According to the 2010 census, the township has a total area of 29.93 square miles (77.5 km^{2}), of which 29.8 square miles (77 km^{2}) (or 99.57%) is land and 0.13 square miles (0.34 km^{2}) (or 0.43%) is water.

=== Cities, towns, villages ===
- Hoffman

=== Unincorporated towns ===
- Posey

(This list is based on USGS data and may include former settlements.)

=== Cemeteries ===
The township contains these five cemeteries: Knolhoff (also known as Rose), Posey, Trinity Lutheran, Wadsworth, and Watts.

=== Major highways ===
- Illinois Route 127
- Illinois Route 161

=== Airports and landing strips ===
- Twenhafel Field

=== Lakes ===
- Bear Lake
- Mossy Lake

== Demographics ==
As of the 2020 census there were 812 people, 342 households, and 269 families residing in the township. The population density was 27.14 inhabitants per square mile (10.48/km^{2}). There were 373 housing units at an average density of 12.47 per square mile (4.81/km^{2}). The racial makeup of the township was 93.35% White, 0.49% African American, 0.49% Native American, 0.62% Asian, 0.00% Pacific Islander, 1.35% from other races, and 3.69% from two or more races. Hispanic or Latino of any race were 1.85% of the population.

There were 342 households, out of which 31.60% had children under the age of 18 living with them, 72.51% were married couples living together, 0.58% had a female householder with no spouse present, and 21.35% were non-families. 21.30% of all households were made up of individuals, and 10.20% had someone living alone who was 65 years of age or older. The average household size was 2.80 and the average family size was 3.27.

The township's age distribution consisted of 27.2% under the age of 18, 7.7% from 18 to 24, 25.6% from 25 to 44, 29.7% from 45 to 64, and 9.8% who were 65 years of age or older. The median age was 35.3 years. For every 100 females, there were 129.5 males. For every 100 females age 18 and over, there were 133.9 males.

The median income for a household in the township was $64,306, and the median income for a family was $86,528. Males had a median income of $45,357 versus $28,125 for females. The per capita income for the township was $27,316. No families and 1.7% of the population were below the poverty line, including none of those under age 18 and 4.3% of those age 65 or over.

Historical population
Census	Pop.	Note	%±
2010	960		—
2020	812		−15.4%
U.S. Decennial Census

== School districts ==
- Carlyle Community Unit School District 1

== Political districts ==
- Illinois' 19th congressional district
- State House District 107
- State Senate District 54
