= South Shore State Park =

State park in Clinton County, Illinois

- IUCN category III (natural monument or feature)
- Location within Illinois Location within the United States
- Location: Clinton County, Illinois, United States
- Nearest city: Carlyle, Illinois
- Coordinates: 38°37′13″N 89°18′13″W
- Area: 26,000 acres (10,500 ha)
- Governing body: Illinois Department of Natural Resources

South Shore State Park is an officially designated Illinois state park on 26,000 acres (10,500 ha) in Clinton County, Illinois, United States. It contains part of the shoreline of the largest manmade reservoir in Illinois, Carlyle Lake.

== Closure ==
In October 2016, part of the state park was closed to the public through legal action taken by the underlying landowner, the United States Army Corps of Engineers. The Army Corps stated that a lack of active maintenance work by the leaseholder of the land, the Illinois Department of Natural Resources, had rendered this portion of the state park unusable. The Army Corps expressed the hope that federal funding can be found to conduct emergency infrastructure repairs.

As of October 2016, the Army Corps goal is to incorporate this land parcel and section of Caryle Lake shoreline into the adjoining Dam East Recreation Area. The Army Corps set a 2017 goal date for reopening a section of Carlyle Lake shoreline affected by this closure. It was not clear how the closure and repossession of the Dam East parcel would affect the remaining state of Illinois property in the area, and whether there would continue to be a South Shore State Park.
