= Clinton County Board (Illinois) =

Legislative body in Illinois, United States

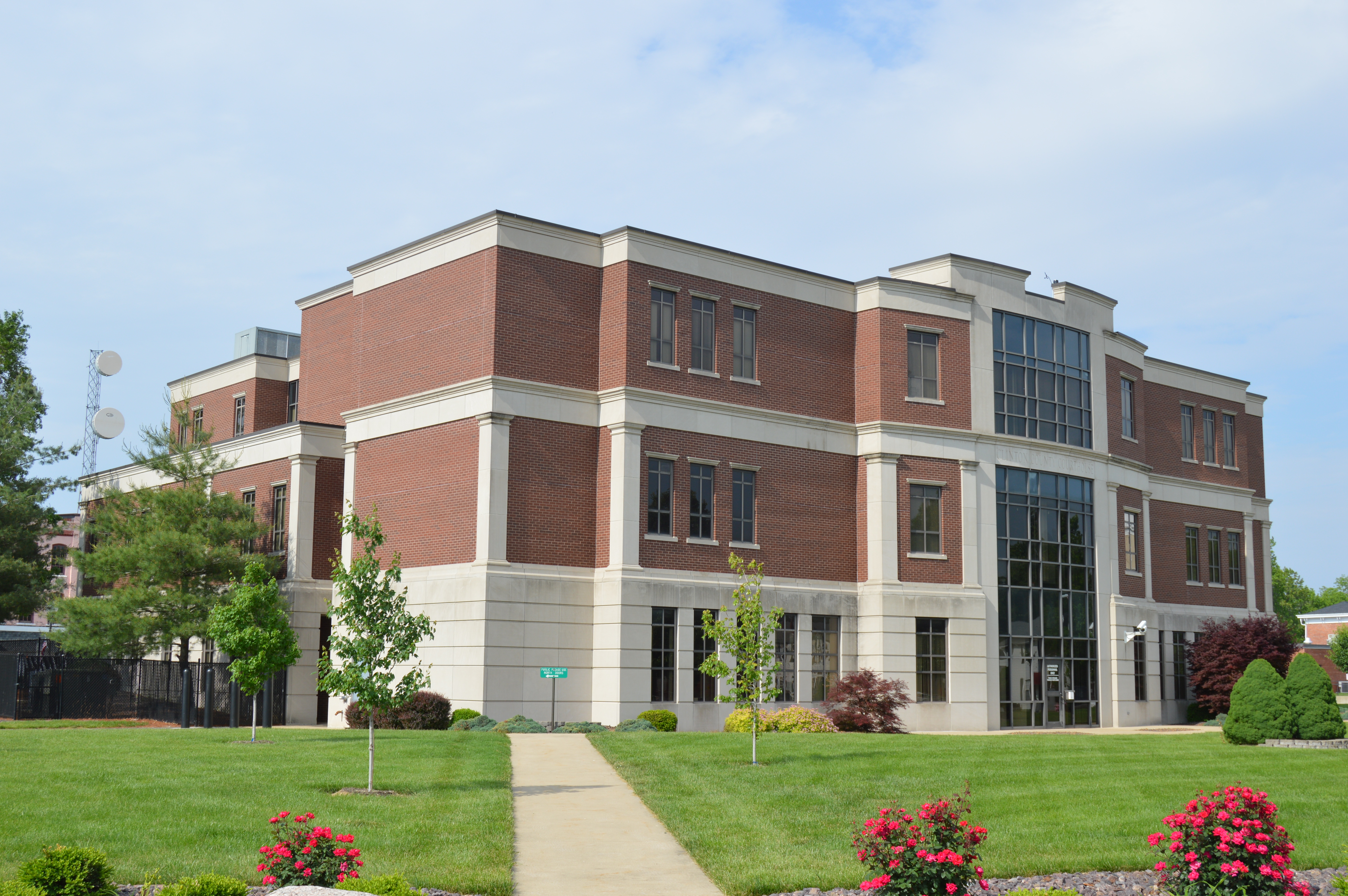
- Clinton County Courthouse

Agency overview
- Headquarters: Clinton County Jail; 810 Franklin St; Carlyle, Illinois
- Agency executive: Brad Knolhoff, Clinton County Board President
- Website: clintonco.illinois.gov

The Clinton County Board is the legislative body in Clinton County, Illinois, made up of 15 board members who are elected by district for four- and two- year terms. The county board sets policy and laws for the county regarding property, public health services, public safety, and maintenance of county highways. Since 2022, Clinton County is presided over by the County Board Chairman, Brad Knolhoff.

== Composition ==
Affiliation	Members
Republican Party	15
Democratic Party	0
Total	15

== List of members ==
This is a list of the Clinton County Board Members in order by district. This list is current as of September 2025.

District	Commissioner	Term Expires	Party
Chairman	Brad Knolhoff	2026	Republican
1	Nelson Heinzmann	2026	Republican
1	Ken Knolhoff	2026	Republican
1	Joe Jansen	2028	Republican
2	Brad Knolhoff	2026	Republican
2	Jeff Crisel	2026	Republican
2	Greg Riechman	2028	Republican
3	Mike Strieker	2026	Republican
3	Ann Schroeder	2028	Republican
3	Mike Hilmes	2026	Republican
4	David Viezer	2028	Republican
4	Mike Rakers	2026	Republican
4	Kurt Schmitz	2028	Republican
5	Gary Arentsen	2028	Republican
5	Bruce Rapien	2028	Republican
5	Curt Haselhorst	2026	Republican
