= Harbor Light Bay, Illinois =

- Unincorporated community
- Location within Illinois Location within the United States
- Coordinates: 38°42′43″N 89°17′45″W
- Country: United States
- State: Illinois
- County: Clinton
- Elevation: 472 ft (144 m)
- Time zone: UTC-6 (Central (CST))
  - Summer (DST): UTC-5 (CDT)
- Area code: 618
- GNIS feature ID: 1810435

Harbor Light Bay is an unincorporated community in Clinton County, Illinois, United States. Harbor Light Bay is located on the western shore of Carlyle Lake 2.5 miles (4.0 km) south-southwest of Keyesport. There exists a landowner’s association.
