= Trenton, Illinois =

Trenton
- City
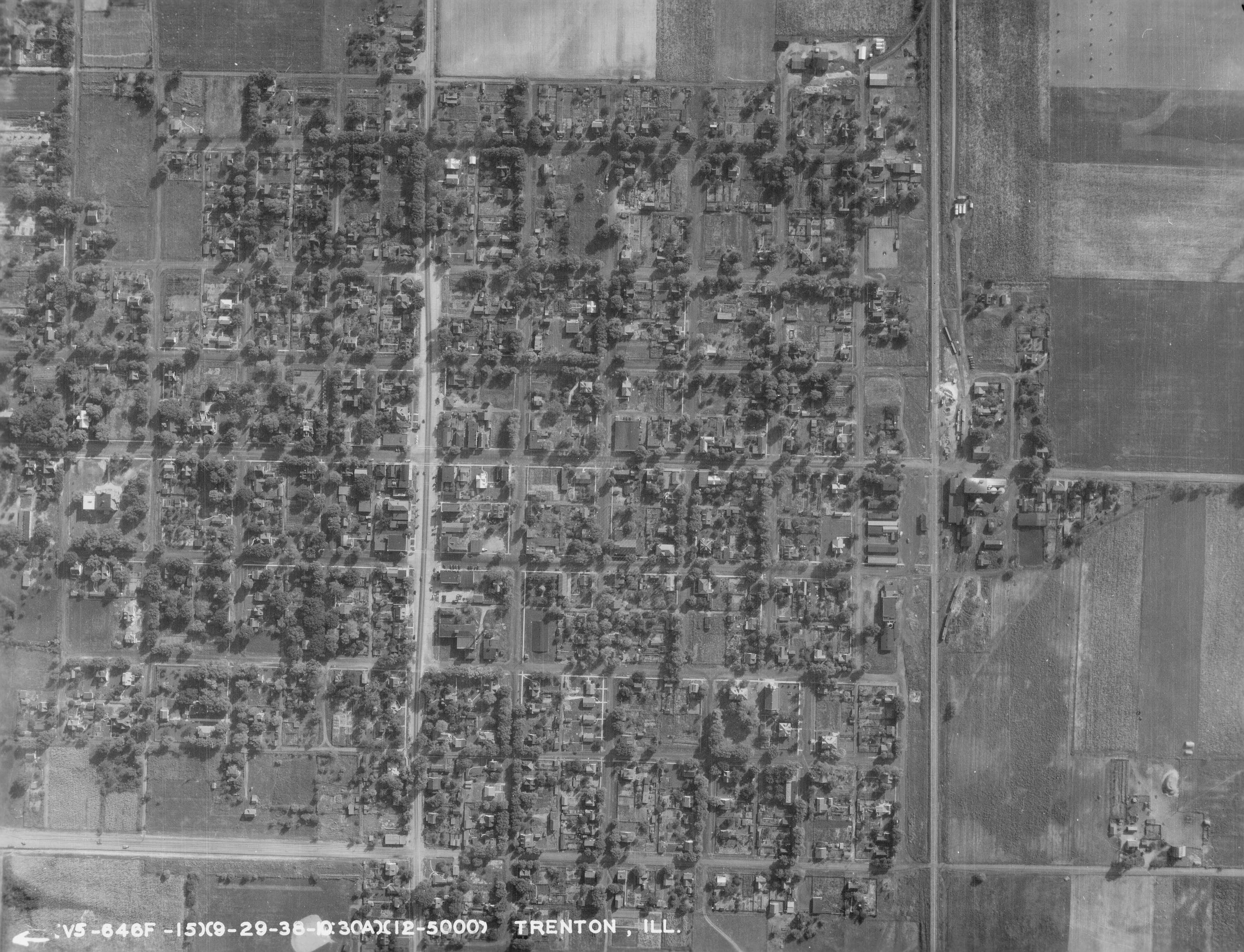
- Trenton in 1938

- Location of Trenton in Clinton County, Illinois.
- Coordinates: 38°36′30″N 89°41′07″W
- Country: United States
- State: Illinois
- County: Clinton

Area
  - Total: 1.88 sq mi (4.88 km^{2})
  - Land: 1.88 sq mi (4.88 km^{2})
  - Water: 0 sq mi (0.00 km^{2})
- Elevation: 486 ft (148 m)

Population (2020)
  - Total: 2,690
  - Density: 1,428.7/sq mi (551.63/km^{2})
- Time zone: UTC-6 (CST)
  - Summer (DST): UTC-5 (CDT)
- ZIP code: 62293
- Area code: 618
- FIPS code: 17-75991
- GNIS feature ID: 2397049
- Website: trentonil.org

Trenton is a city in Clinton County, Illinois, United States. The population was 2,690 at the 2020 census. There is, however, a small portion of St. Clair County, Illinois inside Trenton.

== History ==
The town was laid out by A. W. Casad in 1836 from Trenton, New Jersey, who gave his new town the name Trenton after the place he was from. The planned town was supposed to be built just north of the Ohio and Mississippi Railroad in an area which is now called “Old Trenton”. However, the old town was abandoned as no one ever built in the lots they bought. In response to his failed venture, Mr. Casad returned to his hometown of Trenton, New Jersey. Mr. William Lewis, A. W. Casad's brother in law however didn't go back to New Jersey. Instead, he opted to stay and in 1818 built a farmhouse where the current town lies today.

In 1853 Mr. Buckman built a railroad depot and even managed to get a post office to be established. However, his business partner Mr. Walker abandoned him, which made Buckman move out of the area. Buckman would eventually resettle in Iowa.

On 14 May 1855, Alva Lewis refounded the town, and this time it stayed. Several more major additions were added to the town throughout the mid-1800s by multiple other people and companies. On 12 March 1856 and 11 June 1860 by William Lewis, 22 May 1856 and 2 July 1866 by Joseph Hanke, 12 June 1856 by Sanger Ramp & Co, and finally by Mathias Leonard and Sanger Kamp on 26 May 1868.

On 16 February 1856, the town was chartered as a village with one Joseph P. Hanke as its mayor. By 1868 the town's south side had taken shape and no new major additions were added to that side of Town. On 20 September 1887, the Town was incorporated as a city. The town was now called the City of Trenton, which is the name it currently holds.

In 1865 a coal mine was built in the town and in 1868 it reach full operational capacity. The mine was founded by Joseph Hanke, Wm. Schaeffer, and Johnson Buchter, with the mine eventually being bought out completely by Joseph Hanke. Hanke himself would be bought out by Consolidated Coal Company, which was based out of St Louis. Out of the 500 men in the town 300 were employed by the mine. On 27 February 1909, the south mine burned down and never reopened causing a huge financial blow to the town.

The first church established in the town was St. John United Church of Christ in 1840. This would be followed by St. Mary Catholic Church in 1864, Grace Community Baptist Church in 1882, West Gate Baptist Church in 1961, and the New Life Christian Center in 1985. Many of these churches host humanitarian and education ventures. These include a food pantry held at West Gate Baptist Church and a preschool held at St. John United Church of Christ.

In 1886 a school was built in the town after the first one was destroyed in a fire. In 1957 a merger of New Baden, New Memphis, and Trenton formed the Wesclin School District #3 with a high school being built in 1972 along Route 161 exactly 2.5 miles between New Baden and Trenton. A new high school was built in 2014.

== Geography ==
According to the 2021 census gazetteer files, Trenton has a total area of 1.88 square miles (4.87 km^{2}), all land.

== Demographics ==
Historical population
Census	Pop.	Note	%±
1870	948		—
1880	1,188		25.3%
1890	1,384		16.5%
1900	1,706		23.3%
1910	1,694		−0.7%
1920	1,200		−29.2%
1930	1,271		5.9%
1940	1,316		3.5%
1950	1,432		8.8%
1960	1,866		30.3%
1970	2,328		24.8%
1980	2,504		7.6%
1990	2,481		−0.9%
2000	2,610		5.2%
2010	2,715		4.0%
2020	2,690		−0.9%
U.S. Decennial Census

=== 2020 census ===
As of the 2020 census, Trenton had a population of 2,690, with 1,162 households and 644 families residing in the city. The population density was 1,430.85 inhabitants per square mile (552.45/km^{2}), and there were 1,245 housing units at an average density of 662.23 per square mile (255.69/km^{2}).

The median age was 41.2 years. 20.6% of residents were under the age of 18 and 20.8% were 65 years of age or older. For every 100 females, there were 92.8 males, and for every 100 females age 18 and over, there were 90.3 males.

There were 1,162 households, of which 28.9% had children under the age of 18 living in them. Of all households, 48.4% were married-couple households, 17.0% were households with a male householder and no spouse or partner present, and 28.3% were households with a female householder and no spouse or partner present. About 31.7% of all households were made up of individuals, and 16.4% had someone living alone who was 65 years of age or older.

0.0% of residents lived in urban areas, while 100.0% lived in rural areas.

There were 1,245 housing units, of which 6.7% were vacant. The homeowner vacancy rate was 3.0% and the rental vacancy rate was 9.8%.

Racial composition as of the 2020 census
Race	Number	Percent
White	2,468	91.7%
Black or African American	24	0.9%
American Indian and Alaska Native	17	0.6%
Asian	18	0.7%
Native Hawaiian and Other Pacific Islander	0	0.0%
Some other race	41	1.5%
Two or more races	122	4.5%
Hispanic or Latino (of any race)	82	3.0%

=== Income and poverty ===
The median income for a household in the city was $54,138, and the median income for a family was $77,708. Males had a median income of $51,447 versus $34,808 for females. The per capita income for the city was $32,522. About 2.3% of families and 7.7% of the population were below the poverty line, including 4.6% of those under age 18 and 13.4% of those age 65 or over.

== Notable people ==
- Trem Carr (1891–1946), film producer; born in Trenton
- Lefty Leifield, pitcher for the Pittsburgh Pirates, Chicago Cubs and St. Louis Browns; born in Trenton
- Russ Schoene, basketball player
