= Jamestown, Illinois =

Jamestown
- Unincorporated community
- Location of Jamestown within Illinois Jamestown (the United States)
- Coordinates: 38°44′02″N 89°30′52″W
- Country: United States
- State: Illinois
- County: Clinton
- Elevation: 509 ft (155 m)
- Time zone: UTC-6 (CST)
  - Summer (DST): UTC-5 (CDT)
- GNIS feature ID: 411033

Jamestown is an unincorporated community located in Clinton County, Illinois, United States.

== History ==
The first settlement near Jamestown was made in 1817 by John King and his brother-in-law. In the 1840s and 1850s, many German farmers settled in the area. Jamestown itself was founded on June 4, 1850, by William Lenox and James Massey.

== Churches ==
There is one church in Jamestown, the St. Paul United Church of Christ. It was founded and constructed by the residents in Jamestown and surrounding areas as the St. Paul's Evangelical Church in 1908. It was primarily a German-speaking church upon its founding due to the demographics at that time, but over the next decades gradually held more and more services in English.
