= Huey, Illinois =

- Village
- Location of Huey in Clinton County, Illinois.
- Coordinates: 38°36′19″N 89°17′24″W
- Country: United States
- State: Illinois
- County: Clinton

Government
  - Village president: Brian Jones

Area
  - Total: 0.22 sq mi (0.56 km^{2})
  - Land: 0.22 sq mi (0.56 km^{2})
  - Water: 0 sq mi (0.00 km^{2})
- Elevation: 449 ft (137 m)

Population (2020)
  - Total: 160
  - Density: 742/sq mi (286.4/km^{2})
- Time zone: UTC-6 (CST)
  - Summer (DST): UTC-5 (CDT)
- ZIP code: 62231
- Area code: 618
- FIPS code: 17-36477
- GNIS feature ID: 2398556

Huey is a village in Clinton County, Illinois, in the United States. As of the 2020 census, the village population was 160.

== Geography ==
Huey is located in eastern Clinton County and U.S. Route 50 passes north of the village, leading 4 miles (6 km) west to Carlyle, the county seat, and east 9 miles (14 km) to Sandoval.

According to the 2021 census gazetteer files, Huey has a total area of 0.22 square miles (0.57 km^{2}), all land.

== Demographics ==
Historical population
Census	Pop.	Note	%±
1900	267		—
1910	205		−23.2%
1920	154		−24.9%
1930	184		19.5%
1940	163		−11.4%
1950	175		7.4%
1960	212		21.1%
1970	205		−3.3%
1980	215		4.9%
1990	210		−2.3%
2000	196		−6.7%
2010	169		−13.8%
2020	160		−5.3%
U.S. Decennial Census

As of the 2020 census there were 160 people, 64 households, and 37 families residing in the village. The population density was 740.74 inhabitants per square mile (286.00/km^{2}). There were 69 housing units at an average density of 319.44 per square mile (123.34/km^{2}). The racial makeup of the village was 95.00% White, 1.88% African American, 0.63% from other races, and 2.50% from two or more races. No residents identified as Hispanic or Latino of any race.

There were 64 households, out of which 18.8% had children under the age of 18 living with them, 50.00% were married couples living together, 6.25% had a female householder with no husband present, and 42.19% were non-families. 9.38% of all households were made up of individuals, and 3.13% had someone living alone who was 65 years of age or older. The average household size was 2.49 and the average family size was 2.13.

The village's age distribution consisted of 16.2% under the age of 18, 2.2% from 18 to 24, 31.7% from 25 to 44, 30.1% from 45 to 64, and 19.9% who were 65 years of age or older. The median age was 45.0 years. For every 100 females, there were 86.3 males. For every 100 females age 18 and over, there were 100.0 males.

The median income for a household in the village was $31,500, and the median income for a family was $31,458. Males had a median income of $27,500 versus $26,429 for females. The per capita income for the village was $24,390. About 2.7% of families and 8.9% of the population were below the poverty line, including none of those under age 18 and 11.1% of those age 65 or over.
