= Germantown, Illinois =

- Village
- Location of Germantown in Clinton County, Illinois.
- Coordinates: 38°33′19″N 89°32′29″W
- Country: United States
- State: Illinois
- County: Clinton

Government
  - Village president: Duane G Ripperda

Area
  - Total: 1.02 sq mi (2.63 km^{2})
  - Land: 1.02 sq mi (2.63 km^{2})
  - Water: 0 sq mi (0.00 km^{2})
- Elevation: 436 ft (133 m)

Population (2020)
  - Total: 1,324
  - Density: 1,306.0/sq mi (504.26/km^{2})
- Time zone: UTC-6 (CST)
  - Summer (DST): UTC-5 (CDT)
- ZIP code: 62245
- Area code: 618
- FIPS code: 17-29041
- GNIS feature ID: 2398955
- Website: www.germantownil.net

Germantown is a village in Clinton County, Illinois, United States. The population was 1,324 at the 2020 census.

== History ==
The village of Germantown was established in 1833. Formerly known as "Hanover" for the city in Germany that was the hometown of the first settlers, Germantown is said to be one of the first true German settlements in Illinois.

== Geography ==
Illinois Route 161 runs along the southern border of the village, leading east 22 miles (35 km) to Centralia and west 9 miles (14 km) to New Baden. St. Louis is 39 miles (63 km) to the west via Interstate 64.

According to the 2021 census gazetteer files, Germantown has a total area of 1.01 square miles (2.62 km^{2}), all land.

== Demographics ==
Historical population
Census	Pop.	Note	%±
1880	493		—
1890	537		8.9%
1900	655		22.0%
1910	711		8.5%
1920	766		7.7%
1930	776		1.3%
1940	796		2.6%
1950	811		1.9%
1960	983		21.2%
1970	1,108		12.7%
1980	1,191		7.5%
1990	1,167		−2.0%
2000	1,118		−4.2%
2010	1,269		13.5%
2020	1,324		4.3%
U.S. Decennial Census

=== 2020 census ===
As of the 2020 census, Germantown had a population of 1,324 and 319 families. The population density was 1,305.72 inhabitants per square mile (504.14/km^{2}). There were 560 housing units at an average density of 552.27 per square mile (213.23/km^{2}).

The median age was 40.0 years. 24.2% of residents were under the age of 18 and 17.4% of residents were 65 years of age or older. For every 100 females there were 104.0 males, and for every 100 females age 18 and over there were 100.8 males age 18 and over.

0.0% of residents lived in urban areas, while 100.0% lived in rural areas.

There were 531 households in Germantown, of which 31.1% had children under the age of 18 living in them. Of all households, 54.6% were married-couple households, 16.2% were households with a male householder and no spouse or partner present, and 21.7% were households with a female householder and no spouse or partner present. About 28.3% of all households were made up of individuals and 13.4% had someone living alone who was 65 years of age or older.

There were 560 housing units, of which 5.2% were vacant. The homeowner vacancy rate was 0.0% and the rental vacancy rate was 14.1%.

Racial composition as of the 2020 census
Race	Number	Percent
White	1,233	93.1%
Black or African American	3	0.2%
American Indian and Alaska Native	5	0.4%
Asian	0	0.0%
Native Hawaiian and Other Pacific Islander	0	0.0%
Some other race	26	2.0%
Two or more races	57	4.3%
Hispanic or Latino (of any race)	58	4.4%

=== Income and poverty ===
The median income for a household in the village was $61,364, and the median income for a family was $77,917. Males had a median income of $50,000 versus $32,130 for females. The per capita income for the village was $31,878. About 7.2% of families and 7.3% of the population were below the poverty line, including 9.0% of those under age 18 and 15.3% of those age 65 or over.

== Notable people ==
- Red Schoendienst, second baseman and Major League Baseball Hall of Famer, born in Germantown

== Schools ==
Germantown Elementary provides classes for students in Pre-K up to eighth grade. The school has received several awards in past years for academic excellence. In addition, the school offers many extra-curricular activities, including: student council, scholar bowl, math team, science fair, team quest, concert band, jazz band, group and solo vocal performing, girls and boys track and field, girls and boys basketball, cheerleading, and girls volleyball.

There is no high school in Germantown, but there are two high schools in the neighboring town, Breese. Germantown is in the service area of Central Community High School, formed as a consolidation of the Breese and Aviston high schools in 1971. A private school in Breese in Mater Dei Catholic High School.
