= North Harbor, Illinois =

- Unincorporated community
- Location within Illinois Location within the United States
- Coordinates: 38°43′35″N 89°17′35″W
- Country: United States
- State: Illinois
- County: Clinton
- Elevation: 476 ft (145 m)
- Time zone: UTC-6 (Central (CST))
  - Summer (DST): UTC-5 (CDT)
- Area code: 618
- GNIS feature ID: 1810446

North Harbor is an unincorporated community in Clinton County, Illinois, United States. North Harbor is 1.5 miles (2.4 km) southwest of Keyesport.
