= Carlyle Lake =

Reservoir in Illinois, United States

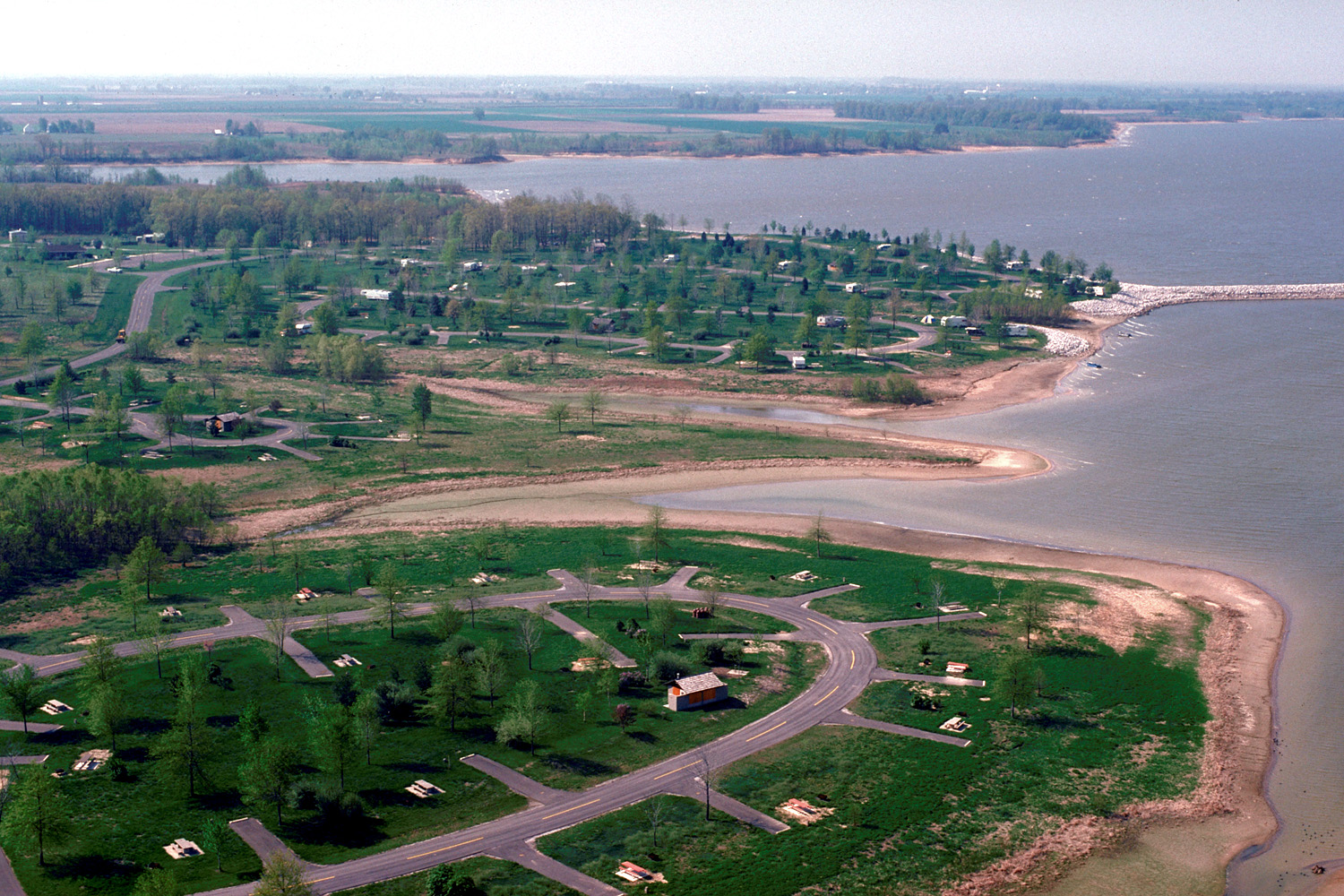
- Carlyle Lake over the Coles Creek Recreation Area

- Location within Illinois Location within the United States
- Location: Clinton / Fayette / Bond counties, Illinois, U.S.
- Coordinates: 38°37′8.18″N 89°21′10.28″W (Dam)
- Type: Reservoir
- Primary inflows: Kaskaskia River, North Fork
- Primary outflows: Kaskaskia River
- Basin countries: United States
- Max. length: 15 miles (24.1 km)
- Max. width: 3.5 miles (5.6 km)
- Surface area: 26,000 acres (105.2 km^{2})
- Average depth: 11 feet (3.4 m)
- Max. depth: 35 feet (10.7 m)
- Shore length^{1}: 85 miles (136.8 km)
- Surface elevation: 445 feet (135.6 m)
- Settlements: Carlyle, Keyesport
- ^{1} Shore length is not a well-defined measure.

Carlyle Lake is a 25,000-acre (101.2 km^{2}) reservoir largely located in Clinton County, Illinois, United States, with smaller portions of the lake within Bond and Fayette counties. It is the largest man-made lake in Illinois, and the largest lake wholly contained within the state.

== History ==
With the frequent flooding of the Kaskaskia River, citizens of Clinton County formed an organization in 1933 to discuss the Kaskaskia River Valley Project. This group made efforts to study all of the physical, economic, and social aspects of the Kaskaskia River throughout the state of Illinois. After completing this report the possibilities of Carlyle Lake were discussed. In 1938, Congress approved the Flood Control Act of June 28, 1938, which authorized a major reservoir at Carlyle, levees downstream, and a plan for the development of the Kaskaskia Basin, but World War II put a temporary halt to the construction of the Carlyle reservoir.

Shortly after settling in Carlyle, Eldon E. Hazlet became interested in the Kaskaskia River and points along the banks. Full of enthusiasm, Hazlet formed the Kaskaskia Valley Association (KVA) to sell the Kaskaskia River Project to the general public. In 1957, the U.S. Army Corps of Engineers completed a comprehensive plan for the Kaskaskia River Project and the Carlyle and Shelbyville Reservoir Projects were authorized in Congress by the Flood Control Act of July 3, 1958.

Construction of Carlyle Lake began October 18, 1958. The government purchased 25,000 acres for the lake, in addition to land surrounding the lake for flowage easement. Homesteads were moved, along with country roads and the Chicago, Burlington and Quincy Railroad. Tracks containing five bridges span the water between Keyesport and Boulder, dividing the upper and lower parts of the lake. The rights to 69 oil wells were purchased, and the wells were plugged to prevent pollution in the lake. Over 600 burial sites had to be moved from seven cemeteries. Other shoreline cemeteries had to be moved to higher ground.

The Carlyle Lake project was completed in April 1967 and the Carlyle Lake Dam was dedicated on June 3, 1967. The damming of the Kaskaskia River at Carlyle is 107 miles from the mouth of the river and creates the largest man-made lake in Illinois.

== Today ==
Located around the lake are the Dam West, Dam East, McNair, Coles Creek, Boulder and Keyesport Recreation Areas operated by the U.S. Army Corps of Engineers. The Illinois Department of Natural Resources operates the Eldon Hazlet State Park and the Carlyle Lake Wildlife Management Area. Carlyle Lake has five developed campgrounds with more than 300 campsites. The lake also has beaches, boat ramps, and access areas for outdoor recreational enthusiasts to enjoy.

Carlyle Lake is a multi purpose lake that was built for the primary purpose of flood risk management. The lake also supports commercial navigation, water supply, water quality, fish and wildlife conservation, and recreational swimming.

Carlyle Lake is used by many for boating, particularly sailing. Many use the lake to catch channel catfish, flatheads, largemouth bass, white bass, crappie, and bluegill.

The lake is separated into two unequal parts by a 3.5-mile-long (5.6 km) railroad embankment, and five bridges, carrying the tracks of the Burlington Northern Santa Fe.

The lake is the subject of Sufjan Stevens' song, "Carlyle Lake" on The Avalanche: Outtakes and Extras from the Illinois Album.

== Beaches of Carlyle Lake ==
1. Keyesport Beach: Located on the northwestern edge of Carlyle Lake, Keyesport Beach (GPS coordinates: 38.733183, -89.275172) is approximately 15 miles from Exit 45 of Interstate 70. With Dam West Beach located farther south, it is one of the largest beaches on Carlyle Lake. It is adjacent to Keyesport Boat Ramp, a public restroom, a small playground, and shaded picnic tables. The beach is surrounded by the town of Keyesport and within a short drive of several restaurants.
2. Dam West Beach: Situated at the Dam West Recreation Area (GPS coordinates: 38.625083, -89.359979), Dam West Beach is the largest public beach on Carlyle Lake. It offers a sandy beach area for swimming and relaxing by the water. It is adjacent to a picnic area with public restrooms, picnic tables, and large, mature trees that provide shade. It is also a short walk from the Carlyle Dam, which attracts walkers, bikers, and wildlife viewers. The beach is approximately two miles outside of the City of Carlyle, which has a population of over 3,000, and is the largest town adjacent to Carlyle Lake.
3. McNair Beach: McNair Beach (GPS coordinates: 38.613239, -89.333340) is another public beach near Caryle Dam. It is approximately one third the size of Dam West Beach and is adjacent to the McNair Campground, to the east side of Carlyle Dam. Picnic tables are available in the area.
4. Coles Creek Beach: Located on the less-frequented east side of Carlyle Lake, Coles Creek Beach (GPS coordinates: 38.656458, -89.266160) is adjacent to Coles Creek Campground, which includes picnic tables and restrooms, and Coles Creek Boat Ramp. It is smaller than McNair Beach.

== See also ==
- Carlyle Lake Resort, Saskatchewan
