= Ferrin, Illinois =

- Unincorporated community
- Location within Illinois Location within the United States
- Coordinates: 38°36′34″N 89°14′00″W
- Country: United States
- State: Illinois
- County: Clinton
- Elevation: 466 ft (142 m)
- Time zone: UTC-6 (Central (CST))
  - Summer (DST): UTC-5 (CDT)
- Area code: 618
- GNIS feature ID: 408341

Ferrin is an unincorporated community in Clinton County, Illinois, United States. It is located along a railroad line 7.5 miles (12.1 km) east of Carlyle.

== History ==
In 1913, Ferrin was an unincorporated community located East of Carlyle. It had four businesses and about 70 inhabitants.
