= Hoffman, Illinois =

- Village
- Location of Hoffman in Clinton County, Illinois.
- Coordinates: 38°32′26″N 89°15′52″W
- Country: United States
- State: Illinois
- County: Clinton

Government
  - Village president: William Guile

Area
  - Total: 0.51 sq mi (1.31 km^{2})
  - Land: 0.51 sq mi (1.31 km^{2})
  - Water: 0 sq mi (0.00 km^{2})
- Elevation: 456 ft (139 m)

Population (2020)
  - Total: 439
  - Density: 866.8/sq mi (334.66/km^{2})
- Time zone: UTC-6 (CST)
  - Summer (DST): UTC-5 (CDT)
- ZIP Code(s): 62250
- Area code: 618
- FIPS code: 17-35398
- GNIS feature ID: 2398518
- Website: www.villageofhoffman.us

Hoffman is a village in Clinton County, Illinois, United States. The population was 439 at the 2020 census.

== Geography ==
Illinois Route 161 runs through the village, leading east 7 miles (11 km) to Centralia and west 11 miles (18 km) to Bartelso. Carlyle, the Clinton County seat, is 11 miles (18 km) to the northwest.

According to the 2021 census gazetteer files, Hoffman has a total area of 0.51 square miles (1.32 km^{2}), all land.

== Demographics ==
Historical population
Census	Pop.	Note	%±
1960	235		—
1970	346		47.2%
1980	467		35.0%
1990	492		5.4%
2000	460		−6.5%
2010	508		10.4%
2020	439		−13.6%
U.S. Decennial Census

As of the 2020 census there were 439 people, 260 households, and 187 families residing in the village. The population density was 867.59 inhabitants per square mile (334.98/km^{2}). There were 198 housing units at an average density of 391.30 per square mile (151.08/km^{2}). The racial makeup of the village was 94.08% White, 0.46% African American, 0.23% Native American, 0.68% Asian, 1.37% from other races, and 3.19% from two or more races. Hispanic or Latino of any race were 2.73% of the population.

There were 260 households, out of which 33.5% had children under the age of 18 living with them, 63.85% were married couples living together, 0.77% had a female householder with no husband present, and 28.08% were non-families. 28.08% of all households were made up of individuals, and 13.46% had someone living alone who was 65 years of age or older. The average household size was 3.73 and the average family size was 2.98.

The village's age distribution consisted of 31.2% under the age of 18, 5.2% from 18 to 24, 26.7% from 25 to 44, 24.7% from 45 to 64, and 12.1% who were 65 years of age or older. The median age was 32.5 years. For every 100 females, there were 148.4 males. For every 100 females age 18 and over, there were 152.6 males.

The median income for a household in the village was $57,600, and the median income for a family was $62,847. Males had a median income of $37,390 versus $20,000 for females. The per capita income for the village was $21,339. No families and 2.1% of the population were below the poverty line, including none of those under age 18 and 4.3% of those age 65 or over.

== Notable people ==
- Bryan Eversgerd, bullpen coach for the St. Louis Cardinals baseball team.
