= Central Community High School =

Public high school near Breese, Illinois, United States

Location
- 7740 Old U.S. Highway 50; Clinton County, Illinois 62230; United States

Information
- Type: Public high school
- Established: 1971; 55 years ago
- Grades: 9–12
- Enrollment: c. 630 (2019)
- Colors: Purple, white, and black
- Nickname: Cougars
- Website: centralcougars.org

Central Community High School is a high school in unincorporated area in Clinton County, Illinois, near Breese. It is a part of Central Community High School District #71.

== History ==
The high school and district formed in 1971 as a consolidation of the high schools of Breese and Aviston.

In 2016 the school's enrollment went over 559, which was above the 557 needed to join the 3A athletic league for basketball of both male and female teams; it was previously in 2A.

== Student body ==
The attendance boundary is a 205 square miles (530 km^{2}) territory is mostly in Clinton County and includes small parts of Bond and Madison counties. Municipalities in its territory are, aside from Breese and Aviston, Albers, Bartelso, Beckemeyer, Damiansville, Germantown, and St. Rose.
