= Marydale, Illinois =

- Unincorporated community
- Location within Illinois Location within the United States
- Coordinates: 38°41′51″N 89°22′19″W
- Country: United States
- State: Illinois
- County: Clinton
- Elevation: 463 ft (141 m)
- Time zone: UTC-6 (Central (CST))
  - Summer (DST): UTC-5 (CDT)
- Area code: 618
- GNIS feature ID: 422947

Marydale is an unincorporated community in Clinton County, Illinois, United States. Marydale is located on Illinois Route 127 6 miles (9.7 km) north of Carlyle.
