= New Memphis, Illinois =

- Unincorporated community
- Location within Illinois Location within the United States
- Coordinates: 38°28′45″N 89°40′42″W
- Country: United States
- State: Illinois
- County: Clinton
- Elevation: 423 ft (129 m)
- Time zone: UTC-6 (Central (CST))
  - Summer (DST): UTC-5 (CDT)
- ZIP code: 62266
- Area code: 618
- GNIS feature ID: 414445

New Memphis is an unincorporated community in Clinton County, Illinois, United States. New Memphis is located near the junction of Illinois Route 160 and Illinois Route 177 6 miles (9.7 km) east of Mascoutah. New Memphis has a post office with ZIP code 62266.

== History ==
In 1862 a Lutheran church was built in the community. In 1865 the layout of the community was built and people starting, also in 1865 the first store was opened in the community. In 1867 a flour mill was opened in the community attracting more people to the community.
