= Clinton County, Illinois =

County in Illinois, United States

- County
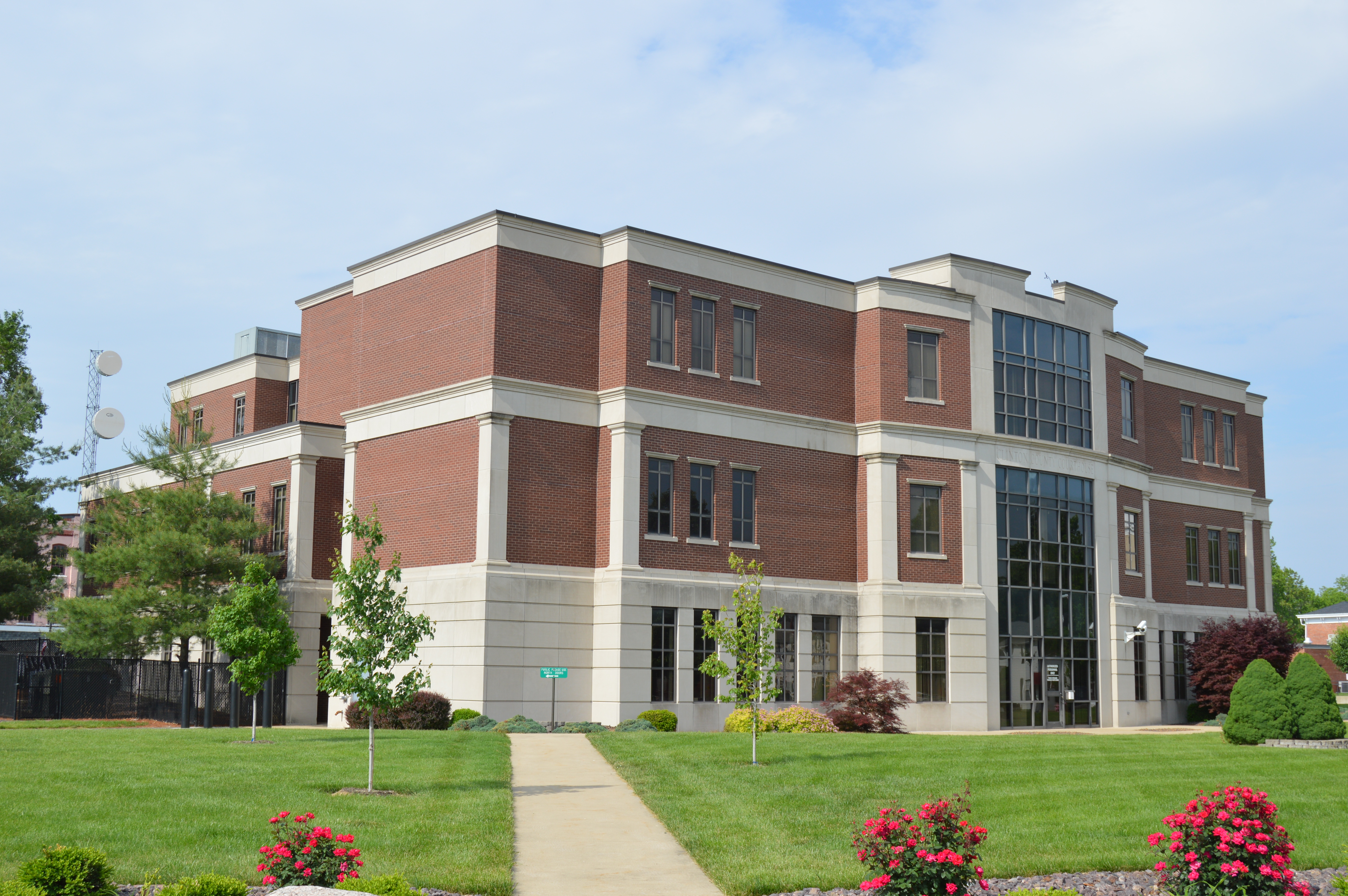
- Clinton County Courthouse

- Location within the U.S. state of Illinois
- Coordinates: 38°37′N 89°25′W
- Country: United States
- State: Illinois
- Founded: 1824
- Named for: DeWitt Clinton
- Seat: Carlyle
- Largest city: Breese

Area
  - Total: 503 sq mi (1,300 km^{2})
  - Land: 474 sq mi (1,230 km^{2})
  - Water: 29 sq mi (75 km^{2}) 5.8%

Population (2020)
  - Total: 36,899
  - Estimate (2025): 37,128 ▲
  - Density: 77.8/sq mi (30.1/km^{2})
- Time zone: UTC−6 (Central)
  - Summer (DST): UTC−5 (CDT)
- Congressional district: 12th
- Website: clintonco.illinois.gov

Clinton County is a county located in the U.S. state of Illinois, in the southern third of the state known as "Little Egypt". At the 2020 census, the population was 36,899. Its county seat is Carlyle. In 1960, the United States Census Bureau placed the mean center of U.S. population in Clinton County. Clinton County is part of the St. Louis, MO-IL Metropolitan Statistical Area.

== History ==
In 1805, prior to the establishment of the county, the territorial government established a post road from its capital (Vincennes, Indiana) to St. Louis, Missouri, passing through the county.

In 1808 a wagon road was laid out through the future Clinton County. It extended from the Goshen Settlement to the Ohio salt works and crossed the Kaskaskia River at Carlyle. Clinton County became the home to early settlers by 1814, when the first land entries were made.

Clinton County was created on December 27, 1824, from portions of Washington, Fayette, and Bond Counties. It was named for the seventh governor of New York, DeWitt Clinton, who helped build the Erie Canal.

Crossing the Kaskaskia became much easier when the bridge now known as the General Dean Suspension Bridge was built in 1859, at a cost of $40,000. Before the bridge was constructed, crossings involved a ferry or a mud bridge. The Illinois General Assembly set aside $20,000 for bridge restoration in 1951, and in 1953 the bridge was named after William F. Dean.

== Geography ==
According to the U.S. Census Bureau, the county has a total area of 503 square miles (1,300 km^{2}), of which 474 square miles (1,230 km^{2}) is land and 29 square miles (75 km^{2}) (5.8%) is water. Eldon Hazlet State Recreation Area and South Shore State Park are in Clinton County. Its southern border is the Kaskaskia River.

=== Climate and weather ===
Carlyle, Illinois

Climate chart (precipitation, max. and min. temperature)
J	F	M	A	M	J	J	A	S	O	N	D
2.2 36 19	2.4 43 23	3.8 54 33	3.9 65 43	4.2 75 53	4.4 84 62	3.7 88 67	2.8 86 65	3.1 79 57	3 68 45	3.8 54 35	3.2 42 24
- █ Average max. and min. temperatures in °F
- █ Precipitation totals in inches
- Source: The Weather Channel
Metric conversion
J	F	M	A	M	J	J	A	S	O	N	D
55 2 −7	61 6 −5	97 12 1	99 18 6	107 24 12	113 29 17	94 31 19	72 30 18	77 26 14	76 20 7	98 12 2	82 6 −4
- █ Average max. and min. temperatures in °C
- █ Precipitation totals in mm

In recent years, average temperatures in the county seat of Carlyle have ranged from a low of 19 °F (−7 °C) in January to a high of 88 °F (31 °C) in July, although a record low of −22 °F (−30 °C) was recorded in January 1994 and a record high of 104 °F (40 °C) was recorded in July 1980. Average monthly precipitation ranged from 2.17 inches (55 mm) in January to 4.44 inches (113 mm) in June.

=== Transit ===
- South Central Transit

=== Major highways ===
- Interstate 64
- US Route 50
- Illinois Route 127
- Illinois Route 160
- Illinois Route 161
- Illinois Route 177

=== Adjacent counties ===
- Bond County - north
- Fayette County - northeast
- Madison County - northwest
- Marion County - east
- St. Clair County - west
- Washington County - south

== Demographics ==
2000 census age pyramid for Clinton County

Historical population
Census	Pop.	Note	%±
1830	2,330		—
1840	3,718		59.6%
1850	5,139		38.2%
1860	10,941		112.9%
1870	16,285		48.8%
1880	18,714		14.9%
1890	17,411		−7.0%
1900	19,824		13.9%
1910	22,832		15.2%
1920	22,947		0.5%
1930	21,369		−6.9%
1940	22,912		7.2%
1950	22,594		−1.4%
1960	24,029		6.4%
1970	28,315		17.8%
1980	32,617		15.2%
1990	33,944		4.1%
2000	35,535		4.7%
2010	37,762		6.3%
2020	36,899		−2.3%
2025 (est.)	37,128	▲	0.6%
US Decennial Census; 1790-1960 1900-1990; 1990-2000 2010

=== 2020 census ===
As of the 2020 census, the county had a population of 36,899. The median age was 41.3 years. 21.8% of residents were under the age of 18 and 18.2% of residents were 65 years of age or older. For every 100 females there were 106.6 males, and for every 100 females age 18 and over there were 106.5 males age 18 and over.

The racial makeup of the county was 89.7% White, 3.1% Black or African American, 0.3% American Indian and Alaska Native, 0.5% Asian, <0.1% Native Hawaiian and Pacific Islander, 2.1% from some other race, and 4.3% from two or more races. Hispanic or Latino residents of any race comprised 3.8% of the population.

19.8% of residents lived in urban areas, while 80.2% lived in rural areas.

There were 14,258 households in the county, of which 30.0% had children under the age of 18 living in them. Of all households, 55.1% were married-couple households, 16.5% were households with a male householder and no spouse or partner present, and 21.9% were households with a female householder and no spouse or partner present. About 26.9% of all households were made up of individuals and 13.1% had someone living alone who was 65 years of age or older.

There were 15,574 housing units, of which 8.4% were vacant. Among occupied housing units, 79.6% were owner-occupied and 20.4% were renter-occupied. The homeowner vacancy rate was 1.5% and the rental vacancy rate was 7.2%.

=== Racial and ethnic composition ===
Clinton County, Illinois – Racial and ethnic composition Note: the US Census treats Hispanic/Latino as an ethnic category. This table excludes Latinos from the racial categories and assigns them to a separate category. Hispanics/Latinos may be of any race.
Race / Ethnicity (NH = Non-Hispanic)	Pop 1980	Pop 1990	Pop 2000	Pop 2010	Pop 2020	% 1980	% 1990	% 2000	% 2010	% 2020
White alone (NH)	31,992	32,447	33,220	34,766	32,845	98.08%	95.59%	93.49%	92.07%	89.01%
Black or African American alone (NH)	309	1,013	1,389	1,323	1,140	0.95%	2.98%	3.91%	3.50%	3.09%
Native American or Alaska Native alone (NH)	31	43	49	80	80	0.10%	0.13%	0.14%	0.21%	0.22%
Asian alone (NH)	91	98	115	167	175	0.28%	0.29%	0.32%	0.44%	0.47%
Native Hawaiian or Pacific Islander alone (NH)	x	x	8	11	5	x	x	0.02%	0.03%	0.01%
Other race alone (NH)	10	7	17	17	93	0.03%	0.02%	0.05%	0.05%	0.25%
Mixed race or Multiracial (NH)	x	x	167	340	1,174	x	x	0.47%	0.90%	3.18%
Hispanic or Latino (any race)	184	336	570	1,058	1,387	0.56%	0.99%	1.60%	2.80%	3.76%
Total	32,617	33,944	35,535	37,762	36,899	100.00%	100.00%	100.00%	100.00%	100.00%

=== 2010 census ===
As of the 2010 United States census, there were 37,762 people, 14,005 households, and 9,760 families residing in the county. The population density was 79.7 inhabitants per square mile (30.8/km^{2}). There were 15,311 housing units at an average density of 32.3 per square mile (12.5/km^{2}). The racial makeup of the county was 93.4% white, 3.5% black or African American, 0.4% Asian, 0.2% American Indian, 1.2% from other races, and 1.1% from two or more races. Those of Hispanic or Latino origin made up 2.8% of the population. In terms of ancestry, 54.8% were German, 9.8% were Irish, 5.8% were English, and 5.6% were American.

Of the 14,005 households, 32.7% had children under the age of 18 living with them, 56.5% were married couples living together, 8.7% had a female householder with no husband present, 30.3% were non-families, and 25.1% of all households were made up of individuals. The average household size was 2.55 and the average family size was 3.02. The median age was 39.3 years.

The median income for a household in the county was $55,278 and the median income for a family was $66,682. Males had a median income of $45,119 versus $34,051 for females. The per capita income for the county was $25,392. About 5.2% of families and 7.8% of the population were below the poverty line, including 9.2% of those under age 18 and 5.7% of those age 65 or over.

== Education ==
- Carlyle Community Unit School District 1
- Patoka Community Unit School District 100
- Sandoval Community Unit School District 501
- Wesclin Community Unit School District 3
- Central Community High School, Breese
- Mater Dei Catholic High School, Breese

== Communities ==
=== Cities ===
- Breese
- Carlyle
- Centralia (partial)
- Trenton
- Wamac (partial)

=== Villages ===
- Albers
- Aviston
- Bartelso
- Beckemeyer
- Damiansville
- Germantown
- Hoffman
- Huey
- Keyesport (partial)
- New Baden (partial)
- Saint Rose

=== Townships ===
- Breese
- Brookside
- Carlyle
- Clement
- East Fork
- Germantown
- Irishtown
- Lake
- Looking Glass
- Meridian
- Saint Rose
- Santa Fe
- Sugar Creek
- Wade
- Wheatfield

=== Unincorporated communities ===
- Boulder
- Ferrin
- Harbor Light Bay
- Jamestown
- Marydale
- New Memphis
- New Memphis Station
- North Harbor
- Panorama Hills
- Posey
- Royal Lake Resort
- Shattuc
- Snearlyille
- Wertenberg

== Politics ==
As of February 2025, the county is one of seven that voted to join the state of Indiana.

United States presidential election results for Clinton County, Illinois
Year	Republican		Democratic		Third party(ies)	
Year	No.	%	No.	%	No.	%
1892	1,361	34.68%	2,393	60.97%	171	4.36%
1896	1,863	41.75%	2,572	57.64%	27	0.61%
1900	1,964	41.60%	2,637	55.86%	120	2.54%
1904	1,848	43.02%	2,153	50.12%	295	6.87%
1908	2,104	39.11%	3,016	56.06%	260	4.83%
1912	973	20.48%	2,674	56.29%	1,103	23.22%
1916	3,423	42.59%	4,201	52.27%	413	5.14%
1920	4,564	63.71%	1,661	23.19%	939	13.11%
1924	2,358	29.69%	1,693	21.32%	3,891	48.99%
1928	3,031	30.77%	6,774	68.76%	47	0.48%
1932	2,548	24.35%	7,736	73.92%	182	1.74%
1936	3,653	32.78%	5,355	48.05%	2,137	19.17%
1940	7,582	62.00%	4,558	37.27%	90	0.74%
1944	6,753	62.82%	3,944	36.69%	53	0.49%
1948	5,128	51.47%	4,773	47.91%	62	0.62%
1952	6,760	58.18%	4,853	41.76%	7	0.06%
1956	7,378	63.46%	4,242	36.48%	7	0.06%
1960	5,709	47.96%	6,188	51.99%	6	0.05%
1964	4,692	39.00%	7,339	61.00%	0	0.00%
1968	6,561	53.78%	4,453	36.50%	1,185	9.71%
1972	7,931	62.39%	4,756	37.41%	25	0.20%
1976	7,245	53.00%	6,275	45.90%	151	1.10%
1980	8,500	62.53%	4,470	32.88%	623	4.58%
1984	9,233	66.43%	4,628	33.30%	38	0.27%
1988	7,681	56.15%	5,935	43.38%	64	0.47%
1992	5,771	36.47%	6,686	42.26%	3,365	21.27%
1996	6,065	43.81%	6,104	44.09%	1,675	12.10%
2000	8,588	55.67%	6,436	41.72%	403	2.61%
2004	10,219	59.65%	6,797	39.68%	115	0.67%
2008	9,357	54.04%	7,657	44.22%	300	1.73%
2012	10,524	63.86%	5,596	33.95%	361	2.19%
2016	12,412	71.26%	3,945	22.65%	1,062	6.10%
2020	14,304	74.45%	4,493	23.38%	417	2.17%
2024	14,407	74.62%	4,447	23.03%	452	2.34%

== See also ==
- Clinton County Board
- National Register of Historic Places listings in Clinton County, Illinois
