= Illinois Route 160 =

State highway in southwestern Illinois, US

Illinois Route 160
- IL 160 highlighted in red

Route information
- Maintained by IDOT
- Length: 46.06 mi (74.13 km)
- Existed: 1959–present

Major junctions
- South end: IL 15 in Addieville
- US 50 in Trenton; US 40 / IL 143 in Highland
- North end: IL 140 in Alhambra

Location
- Country: United States
- State: Illinois
- Counties: Washington, Clinton, Madison

Highway system
- Illinois State Highway System; Interstate; US; State; Tollways; Scenic
← IL 159	→ IL 161

Illinois Route 160 is a north–south highway in southwestern Illinois. Its southern terminus is at Illinois Route 15 south of Addieville, and its northern terminus is at Illinois Route 140 east of Alhambra. This is a distance of 46.06 miles (74.13 km).

== Route description ==
Illinois 160 runs northwest from Addieville to New Memphis via Okawville (near Interstate 64) before turning north. Between Okawville and New Memphis it overlaps Illinois Route 177. It then intersects with Illinois Route 161 at New Baden, U.S. Route 50 north of Trenton, and U.S. Route 40 north of Highland. Illinois 160 passes through the town of Grantfork just north of Interstate 70.

Illinois 160 is a rural state road. It has no direct connections to Interstates 64 or 70.

== History ==
SBI Route 160 originally ran from Alton to Greenville. In February 1935, this Illinois 160 was changed to Illinois Route 140. In 1959 it was used on the current Illinois 160 from New Baden to Highland; in 1960, it was extended south to New Memphis. In 1965, it was extended north to its current northern terminus. Finally, in 1967, Illinois 160 was extended one last time to its current southern terminus, to a new road for Illinois 15.

== Major intersections ==
County	Location	mi	km	Destinations	Notes
Washington		0.0	0.0	IL 15 – Nashville, Belleville	Southern terminus of IL 160
Washington	Okawville	6.8	10.9	IL 177 east (N Front St)	South end of IL 177 concurrency
Clinton		15.7	25.3	IL 177 west – Mascoutah, Belleville	North end of IL 177 concurrency
Clinton	New Baden	19.5	31.4	IL 161 (Hanover St) – Belleville, Centralia	
Clinton	Trenton	24.9	40.1	US 50 – Lebanon, Carlyle	interchange
Madison	Highland	35.6	57.3	IL 143 east / US 40 east	South end of US 40 / IL 143 concurrency
Madison	Highland	36.2	58.3	IL 143 west / US 40 west	North end of US 40 / IL 143 concurrency
Madison		46.06	74.13	IL 140 – Greenville, Alhambra	Northern terminus of IL 160
1.000 mi = 1.609 km; 1.000 km = 0.621 mi: Concurrency terminus
