= Damiansville, Illinois =

- Village
- Location of Damiansville in Clinton County, Illinois.
- Coordinates: 38°30′32″N 89°37′14″W
- Country: United States
- State: Illinois
- County: Clinton

Government
  - Village president: Herman Jansen

Area
  - Total: 0.82 sq mi (2.13 km^{2})
  - Land: 0.82 sq mi (2.13 km^{2})
  - Water: 0 sq mi (0.00 km^{2})
- Elevation: 430 ft (130 m)

Population (2020)
  - Total: 564
  - Density: 686.4/sq mi (265.03/km^{2})
- Time zone: UTC-6 (CST)
  - Summer (DST): UTC-5 (CDT)
- ZIP code: 62215
- Area code: 618
- FIPS code: 17-18472
- GNIS feature ID: 2398675

Damiansville is a village in Clinton County, Illinois, United States. The population was 564 at the 2020 census, up from 491 at the 2010 census.

== Geography ==
Interstate 64 runs along the southern border of the village, with access from Exit 34, and leads 35 miles (56 km) west to St. Louis and 43 miles (69 km) east to Mount Vernon.

According to the 2021 census gazetteer files, Damiansville has a total area of 0.82 square miles (2.12 km^{2}), all land.

== Demographics ==
Historical population
Census	Pop.	Note	%±
1880	96		—
1980	396		—
1990	379		−4.3%
2000	368		−2.9%
2010	491		33.4%
2020	564		14.9%
U.S. Decennial Census

As of the 2020 census there were 564 people, 205 households, and 152 families residing in the village. The population density was 686.13 inhabitants per square mile (264.92/km^{2}). There were 191 housing units at an average density of 232.36 per square mile (89.71/km^{2}). The racial makeup of the village was 75.53% White, 0.71% African American, 0.71% Asian, 3.72% from other races, and 19.33% from two or more races. Hispanic or Latino of any race were 20.39% of the population.

There were 205 households, out of which 40.5% had children under the age of 18 living with them, 66.34% were married couples living together, 3.90% had a female householder with no husband present, and 25.85% were non-families. 18.54% of all households were made up of individuals, and 7.80% had someone living alone who was 65 years of age or older. The average household size was 2.82 and the average family size was 2.54.

The village's age distribution consisted of 22.4% under the age of 18, 6.4% from 18 to 24, 35% from 25 to 44, 23.1% from 45 to 64, and 13.1% who were 65 years of age or older. The median age was 33.7 years. For every 100 females, there were 132.9 males. For every 100 females age 18 and over, there were 131.1 males.

The median income for a household in the village was $70,375, and the median income for a family was $71,667. Males had a median income of $39,500 versus $33,000 for females. The per capita income for the village was $34,250. About 0.7% of families and 2.9% of the population were below the poverty line, including 0.0% of those under age 18 and 5.4% of those age 65 or over.

== Education ==
It is in the service area of Central Community High School, formed as a consolidation of the Breese and Aviston high schools in 1971.
