= Aviston, Illinois =

- Village
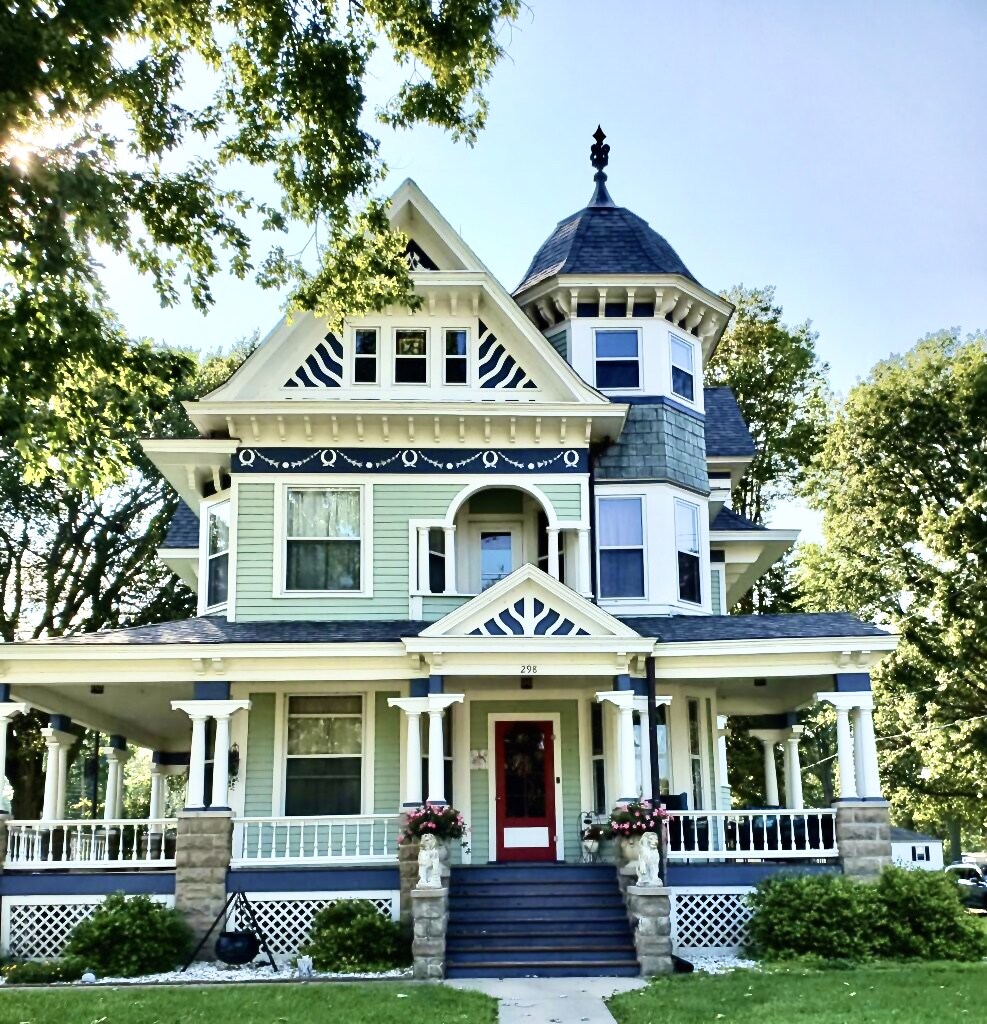
- The James C. Twiss House on N. Page Street

- Location of Aviston in Clinton County, Illinois.
- Coordinates: 38°37′12″N 89°36′32″W
- Country: United States
- State: Illinois
- County: Clinton

Government
  - Village president: Michael Kampwerth

Area
  - Total: 1.60 sq mi (4.14 km^{2})
  - Land: 1.60 sq mi (4.14 km^{2})
  - Water: 0 sq mi (0.00 km^{2})
- Elevation: 466 ft (142 m)

Population (2020)
  - Total: 2,340
  - Density: 1,462.2/sq mi (564.56/km^{2})
- Time zone: UTC-6 (CST)
  - Summer (DST): UTC-5 (CDT)
- ZIP code: 62216
- Area code: 618
- FIPS code: 17-03181
- GNIS feature ID: 2398011
- Website: www.avistonil.org

Aviston is a village in Clinton County, Illinois, United States. The population was 2,340 at the 2020 census, up from 1,945 at the 2010 census.

== Geography ==
U.S. Route 50 bypasses the village to the north, leading east 14 miles (23 km) to Carlyle, the county seat, and west 16 miles (26 km) to Interstate 64 near O'Fallon. Downtown St. Louis is 35 miles (56 km) west of Aviston.

According to the 2021 census gazetteer files, Aviston has a total area of 1.60 square miles (4.14 km^{2}), all land.

== Demographics ==
Historical population
Census	Pop.	Note	%±
1880	367		—
1890	381		3.8%
1900	387		1.6%
1910	397		2.6%
1920	389		−2.0%
1930	368		−5.4%
1940	388		5.4%
1950	503		29.6%
1960	717		42.5%
1970	828		15.5%
1980	846		2.2%
1990	924		9.2%
2000	1,231		33.2%
2010	1,945		58.0%
2020	2,340		20.3%
U.S. Decennial Census

=== 2020 census ===
As of the 2020 census, Aviston had a population of 2,340. The population density was 1,462.50 inhabitants per square mile (564.67/km^{2}).

The median age was 36.4 years. 26.7% of residents were under the age of 18 and 14.1% were 65 years of age or older. For every 100 females, there were 98.3 males, and for every 100 females age 18 and over, there were 90.3 males age 18 and over.

There were 845 households in Aviston, of which 39.5% had children under the age of 18 living in them. Of all households, 62.7% were married-couple households, 10.7% were households with a male householder and no spouse or partner present, and 19.2% were households with a female householder and no spouse or partner present. About 20.1% of all households were made up of individuals, and 7.6% had someone living alone who was 65 years of age or older.

There were 863 housing units at an average density of 539.38 per square mile (208.26/km^{2}), of which 2.1% were vacant. The homeowner vacancy rate was 0.3% and the rental vacancy rate was 3.0%.

0.0% of residents lived in urban areas, while 100.0% lived in rural areas.

Racial composition as of the 2020 census
Race	Number	Percent
White	2,208	94.4%
Black or African American	8	0.3%
American Indian and Alaska Native	11	0.5%
Asian	12	0.5%
Native Hawaiian and Other Pacific Islander	1	0.0%
Some other race	17	0.7%
Two or more races	83	3.5%
Hispanic or Latino (of any race)	59	2.5%

=== Income and poverty ===
The median income for a household in the village was $81,198, and the median income for a family was $108,304. Males had a median income of $50,833 versus $40,852 for females. The per capita income for the village was $36,182. About 3.9% of families and 3.0% of the population were below the poverty line, including 2.9% of those under age 18 and 4.2% of those age 65 or over.

== Schools ==
- Aviston Elementary School
- Central Community High School – formed as a consolidation of the Breese and Aviston high schools in 1971

== Notable people ==
- Henry J. Althoff, Roman Catholic bishop
- Vern Holtgrave, pitcher for the Detroit Tigers
- Trevor Richards, pitcher for the Chicago White Sox
