= Illinois Route 177 =

State highway in southern Illinois, US

Illinois Route 177
- IL 177 highlighted in red

Route information
- Maintained by IDOT
- Length: 47.59 mi (76.59 km)
- Existed: 1924–present

Major junctions
- West end: IL 13 / IL 158 in Belleville
- I-64 in Okawville
- East end: US 51 in Irvington

Location
- Country: United States
- State: Illinois
- Counties: St. Clair, Clinton, Washington

Highway system
- Illinois State Highway System; Interstate; US; State; Tollways; Scenic
← IL 176	→ IL 178

Illinois Route 177 is an east–west state route in southern Illinois. It runs from Illinois Route 13 in Belleville to U.S. Route 51 in Irvington. This is a distance of 47.59 miles (76.59 km).

== Route description ==
Illinois 177 overlaps Illinois Route 160 for about 9 miles (14 km) from south of New Baden to Okawville.

== History ==
SBI Route 177 originally ran from New Minden to Okawville. It was extended east to Irvington in 1937, replacing Route 153. In 1967, it was extended west to Belleville on an old routing of Illinois Route 15.

== Major Intersections ==
County	Location	mi	km	Destinations	Notes
St. Clair	Belleville	0.0	0.0	IL 13 / IL 158 west – East St. Louis, Columbia, Pinckneyville	West end of IL 158 concurrency
St. Clair		6.3	10.1	IL 158 east – Scott Air Force Base	East end of IL 158 concurrency
St. Clair	Mascoutah	10.2	16.4	IL 4 (Jefferson Street)	
Clinton		16.2	26.1	IL 160 north – Highland	West end of IL 160 concurrency
Washington	Okawville	25.1	40.4	IL 160 south (South Front Street) – Addieville	East end of IL 160 concurrency
Washington	Okawville	26.6	42.8	I-64 – East St. Louis, Mt. Vernon	I-64 exit 41
Washington	New Minden	35.3	56.8	IL 127 – Carlyle, Nashville	
Washington		47.59	76.59	US 51	interchange
1.000 mi = 1.609 km; 1.000 km = 0.621 mi: Concurrency terminus
