= Sandoval, Illinois =

- Town
- Location in Marion County, Illinois
- Coordinates: 38°36′44″N 89°07′20″W
- Country: United States
- State: Illinois
- County: Marion
- Township: Sandoval

Area
  - Total: 1.00 sq mi (2.58 km^{2})
  - Land: 1.00 sq mi (2.58 km^{2})
  - Water: 0 sq mi (0.00 km^{2})
- Elevation: 505 ft (154 m)

Population (2020)
  - Total: 1,157
  - Density: 1,162.0/sq mi (448.67/km^{2})
- Time zone: UTC-6 (CST)
  - Summer (DST): UTC-5 (CDT)
- ZIP code: 62882
- Area code: 618
- FIPS code: 17-67444
- GNIS ID: 2399180
- Website: villageofsandoval.com

Sandoval /sænˈdoʊvəl/ is a town in Marion County, Illinois, United States. The population was 1,157 at the 2020 census.

== History ==
In the early days, this area was the crossroads of well traveled Native American trails. A man with the name of Sandoval was the first to establish a trading post. In 1859 the town of Sandoval was incorporated.

Many civil war soldiers passed through Sandoval, which was also a point for enlistment. The 40th Illinois Infantry was accepted May 25, 1861, and went into camp here August 5. With 700 strong, orders were given to proceed to Illinois Town (East St. Louis), then across the river to Jefferson Barracks. Joined with other troops they went on to Savannah, Tennessee and a permanent camp at Pittsburg Landing. More than ½ the regiment was killed or wounded. This regiment, after other engagements, was with Sherman on his march to the Sea and took part in the Grand Review at Washington D.C.. General Ambrose E. Burnside and his troops were also camped here while on their way to aid General Grant.

Sandoval had two major railroads that crossed through the town. The B & O, running east–west, and the Illinois Central running north–south.

Sandoval is located at the junction of US Highways 50 and 51. At the time the US Highways were numbered, this was the meeting point of the central north–south route with the central east–west route, an equal number of highways being numbered to the north, south, east and west.

US Highway 50 is an extension of the Mason-Dixon line that divided the North from "Dixie".

Sandoval was the population center of the United States for a considerable portion of the 20th century.

Sandoval's central location in the United States was recognized early on. The town was originally platted as a replacement for Washington, D.C., with space reserved for the White House and other branches of government.

In the 1890s, Sandoval was a sundown town, prohibiting African Americans from entering or living in the town.

Historical population
| Census | Pop. | Note | %± |
|---|---|---|---|
| 1880 | 564 | | — |
| 1890 | 834 | | 47.9% |
| 1900 | 1,258 | | 50.8% |
| 1910 | 1,563 | | 24.2% |
| 1920 | 1,768 | | 13.1% |
| 1930 | 1,264 | | −28.5% |
| 1940 | 1,796 | | 42.1% |
| 1950 | 1,531 | | −14.8% |
| 1960 | 1,356 | | −11.4% |
| 1970 | 1,332 | | −1.8% |
| 1980 | 1,734 | | 30.2% |
| 1990 | 1,535 | | −11.5% |
| 2000 | 1,434 | | −6.6% |
| 2010 | 1,274 | | −11.2% |
| 2020 | 1,157 | | −9.2% |
U.S. Decennial Census

== Geography ==
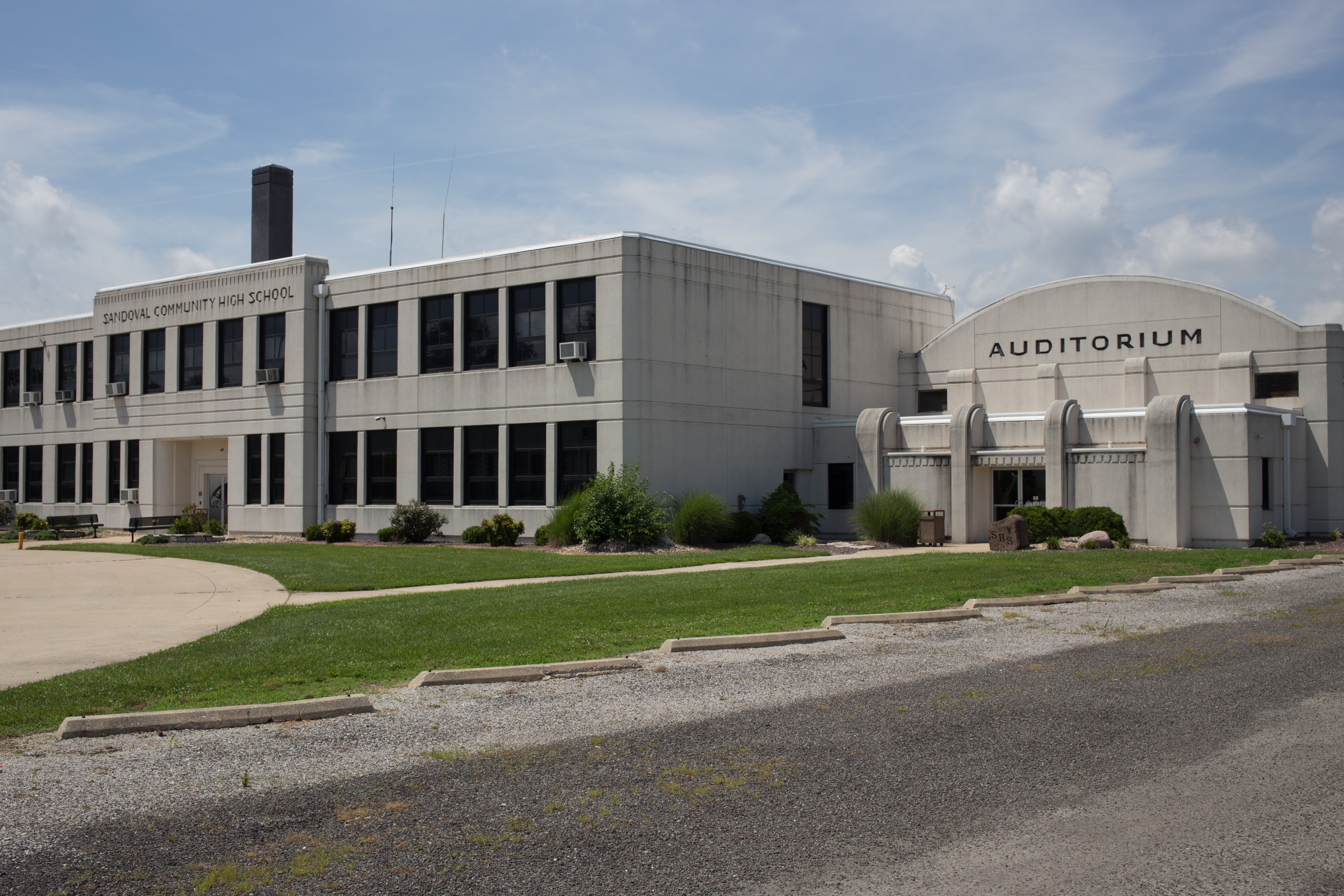
Sandoval Community High School, July 2009

Sandoval is located in western Marion County. U.S. Route 50 passes through the village center as Missouri Avenue, leading east 9 miles (14 km) to Salem, the county seat, and west 14 miles (23 km) to Carlyle. U.S. Route 51 runs through the east side of the village on Mine Street, leading north 24 miles (39 km) to Vandalia and south 6 miles (10 km) to Centralia.

According to the U.S. Census Bureau, Sandoval has a total area of 1.0 square mile (2.6 km^{2}), all land. Prairie Creek, a southwest-flowing tributary Lost Creek, crosses the southeast corner of the village. Via Lost Creek and its outflow to Crooked Creek, Sandoval is part of the Kaskaskia River watershed leading to the Mississippi River.

== Demographics ==
As of the census of 2000, there were 1,434 people, 562 households, and 396 families residing in the village. The population density was 1,494.0 inhabitants per square mile (576.8/km^{2}). There were 641 housing units at an average density of 667.8 per square mile (257.8/km^{2}). The racial makeup of the village was 97.77% White, 0.42% African American, 0.84% Native American, 0.28% Asian, 0.21% from other races, and 0.49% from two or more races. Hispanic or Latino of any race were 0.98% of the population.

There were 562 households, out of which 38.6% had children under the age of 18 living with them, 48.8% were married couples living together, 16.9% had a female householder with no husband present, and 29.4% were non-families. 25.3% of all households were made up of individuals, and 10.1% had someone living alone who was 65 years of age or older. The average household size was 2.55 and the average family size was 3.04.

In the village, the population was spread out, with 30.1% under the age of 18, 8.4% from 18 to 24, 28.5% from 25 to 44, 22.1% from 45 to 64, and 10.9% who were 65 years of age or older. The median age was 34 years. For every 100 females, there were 92.7 males. For every 100 females age 18 and over, there were 85.2 males.

The median income for a household in the village was $30,000, and the median income for a family was $35,700. Males had a median income of $29,191 versus $19,833 for females. The per capita income for the village was $14,739. About 17.1% of families and 21.1% of the population were below the poverty line, including 31.5% of those under age 18 and 8.6% of those age 65 or over.

== See also ==
- List of municipalities in Illinois
- List of sundown towns in the United States
