= Keyesport, Illinois =

- Village
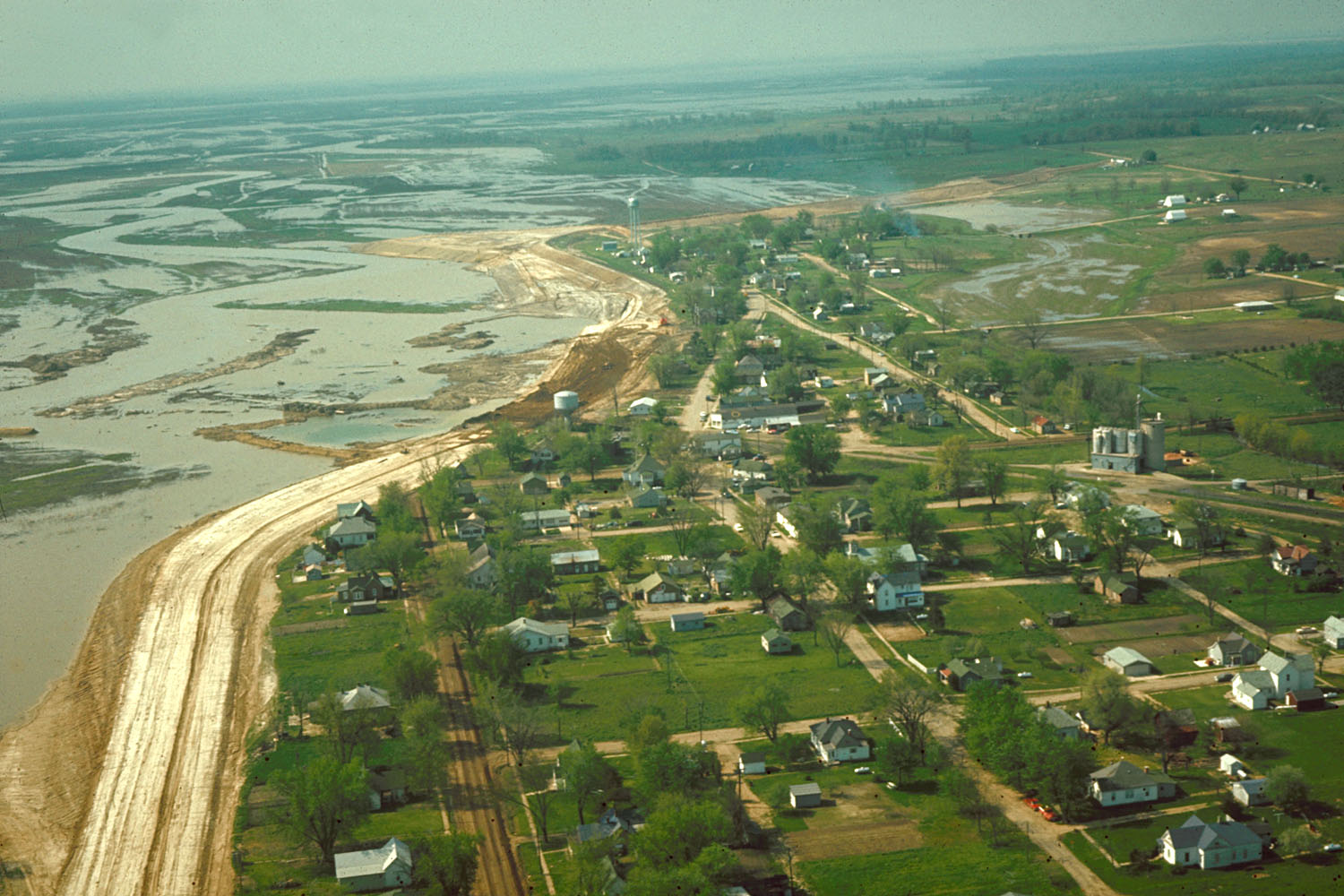
- Aerial view of Keyesport in approximately 1968 when Carlyle Lake was filling from the newly constructed dam. The town is now situated directly on the lakeshore.

- Location of Keyesport in Clinton County, Illinois.

- Location of Illinois in the United States
- Coordinates: 38°44′46″N 89°16′25″W
- Country: United States
- State: Illinois
- Counties: Bond, Clinton
- Townships: Tamalco, Irishtown
- Platted: April 16, 1846
- Incorporated: 1897
- Named after: Thomas Keyes

Area
  - Total: 0.74 sq mi (1.91 km^{2})
  - Land: 0.72 sq mi (1.87 km^{2})
  - Water: 0.015 sq mi (0.04 km^{2})
- Elevation: 459 ft (140 m)

Population (2020)
  - Total: 406
  - Estimate (2024): 403 ▼
  - Density: 563.5/sq mi (217.57/km^{2})
- Time zone: UTC−6 (CST)
  - Summer (DST): UTC−5 (CDT)
- ZIP Code(s): 62253
- Area code: 618
- FIPS code: 17-39753
- GNIS feature ID: 2398342
- Wikimedia Commons: Keyesport, Illinois

Keyesport is a village in Bond and Clinton counties, Illinois, United States. The population was 406 at the 2020 census.

== History ==
Keyesport was named in honor of its postmaster, Thomas Keyes. It is on the boundary between Clinton County and Bond counties. It was platted in 1846 and incorporated as a village in 1897.

== Geography ==
Keyesport is situated on the western shore of Carlyle Lake.

According to the 2021 census gazetteer files, Keyesport has a total area of 0.74 square miles (1.92 km^{2}), of which 0.72 square miles (1.86 km^{2}) (or 97.69%) is land and 0.02 square miles (0.05 km^{2}) (or 2.31%) is water.

== Demographics ==
Historical population
Census	Pop.	Note	%±
1900	500		—
1910	670		34.0%
1920	544		−18.8%
1930	434		−20.2%
1940	547		26.0%
1950	438		−19.9%
1960	412		−5.9%
1970	352		−14.6%
1980	499		41.8%
1990	440		−11.8%
2000	481		9.3%
2010	421		−12.5%
2020	406		−3.6%
U.S. Decennial Census

As of the 2020 census there were 406 people, 194 households, and 147 families residing in the village. The population density was 550.88 inhabitants per square mile (212.70/km^{2}). There were 232 housing units at an average density of 314.79 per square mile (121.54/km^{2}). The racial makeup of the village was 92.36% White, 0.25% Native American, 0.49% Asian, 1.48% from other races, and 5.42% from two or more races. Hispanic or Latino of any race were 0.74% of the population.

There were 194 households, out of which 50.0% had children under the age of 18 living with them, 36.60% were married couples living together, 28.35% had a female householder with no husband present, and 24.23% were non-families. 23.20% of all households were made up of individuals, and 7.73% had someone living alone who was 65 years of age or older. The average household size was 2.52 and the average family size was 2.54.

The village's age distribution consisted of 21.7% under the age of 18, 6.3% from 18 to 24, 21.2% from 25 to 44, 34.3% from 45 to 64, and 16.4% who were 65 years of age or older. The median age was 45.1 years. For every 100 females, there were 87.5 males. For every 100 females age 18 and over, there were 78.7 males.

The median income for a household in the village was $33,629, and the median income for a family was $33,750. Males had a median income of $21,250 versus $19,390 for females. The per capita income for the village was $16,786. About 10.9% of families and 28.7% of the population were below the poverty line, including 44.0% of those under age 18 and 22.2% of those age 65 or over.

== Notable people ==
- Wilbur Clark, builder and owner of Desert Inn hotel and casino in Las Vegas
- Frank Harter, pitcher for the Cincinnati Reds and Indianapolis Hoosiers
