= Eldon Hazlet State Recreation Area =

State park in Illinois, United States

- IUCN category V (protected landscape/seascape)
- Location within Illinois Location within the United States
- Location: Clinton County, Illinois, USA
- Nearest city: Carlyle, Illinois
- Coordinates: 38°39′30″N 89°19′51″W
- Area: 3,000 acres (1,214 ha)
- Governing body: Illinois Department of Natural Resources

Eldon Hazlet State Recreation Area /ˈheɪzlɛt/ is an Illinois state park on 3,000 acres (1,214 ha) in Clinton County, Illinois, United States.
