= New Baden, Illinois =

New Baden
- Village
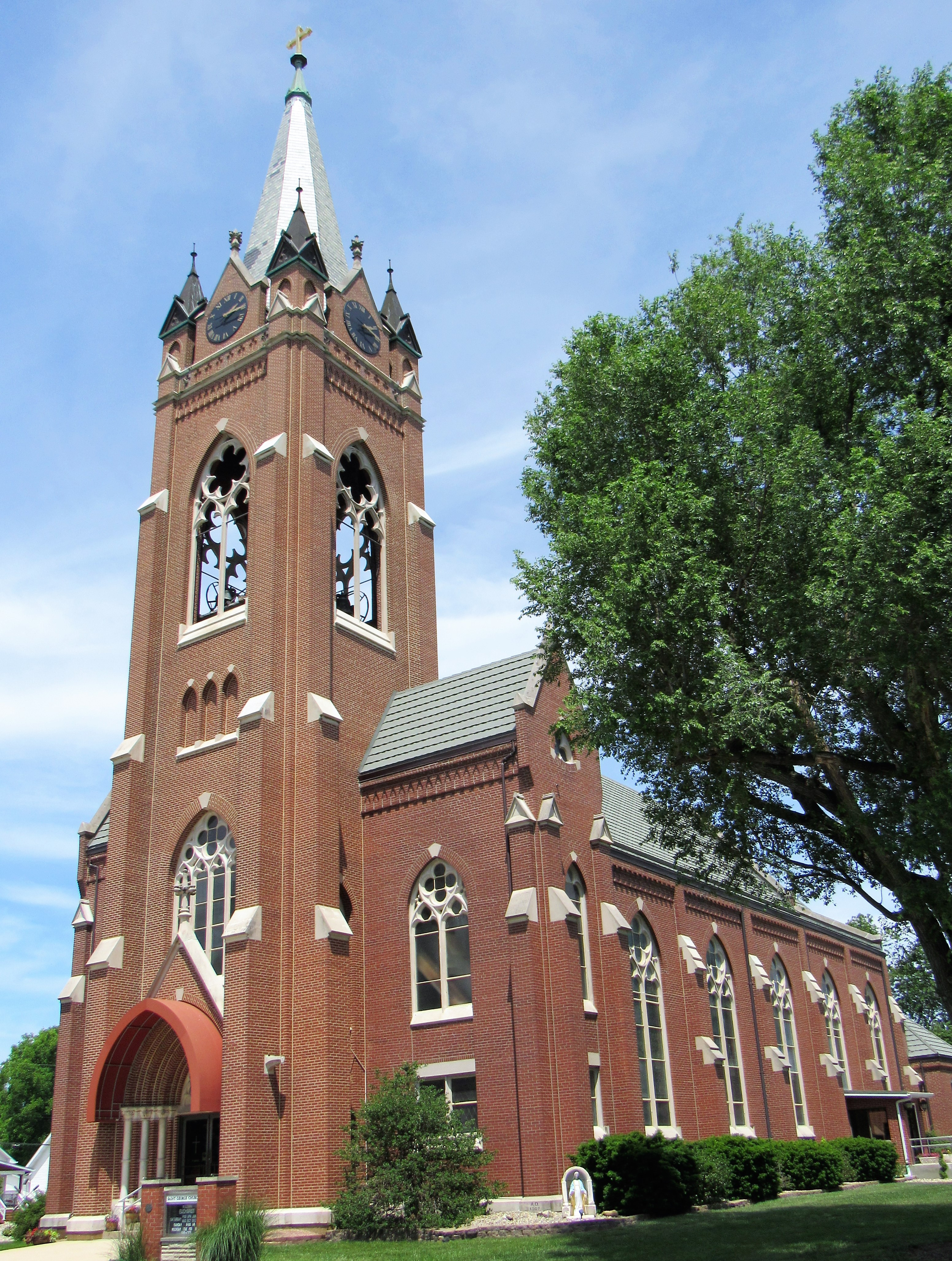
- St. George Catholic Church

- Location of New Baden in Clinton County, Illinois.
- Coordinates: 38°32′12″N 89°42′26″W
- Country: United States
- State: Illinois
- County: Clinton

Government
  - Village president: Taylor Zurliene

Area
  - Total: 1.83 sq mi (4.73 km^{2})
  - Land: 1.83 sq mi (4.73 km^{2})
  - Water: 0 sq mi (0.00 km^{2})
- Elevation: 466 ft (142 m)

Population (2020)
  - Total: 3,428
  - Density: 1,878.9/sq mi (725.43/km^{2})
- Time zone: UTC-6 (CST)
  - Summer (DST): UTC-5 (CDT)
- ZIP code: 62265
- Area code: 618
- FIPS code: 17-52142
- GNIS feature ID: 2399453
- Website: www.newbadenil.com

New Baden is a village in Clinton County, Illinois, United States (and partially in St. Clair County). The population was 3,428 at the 2020 census.

== History ==
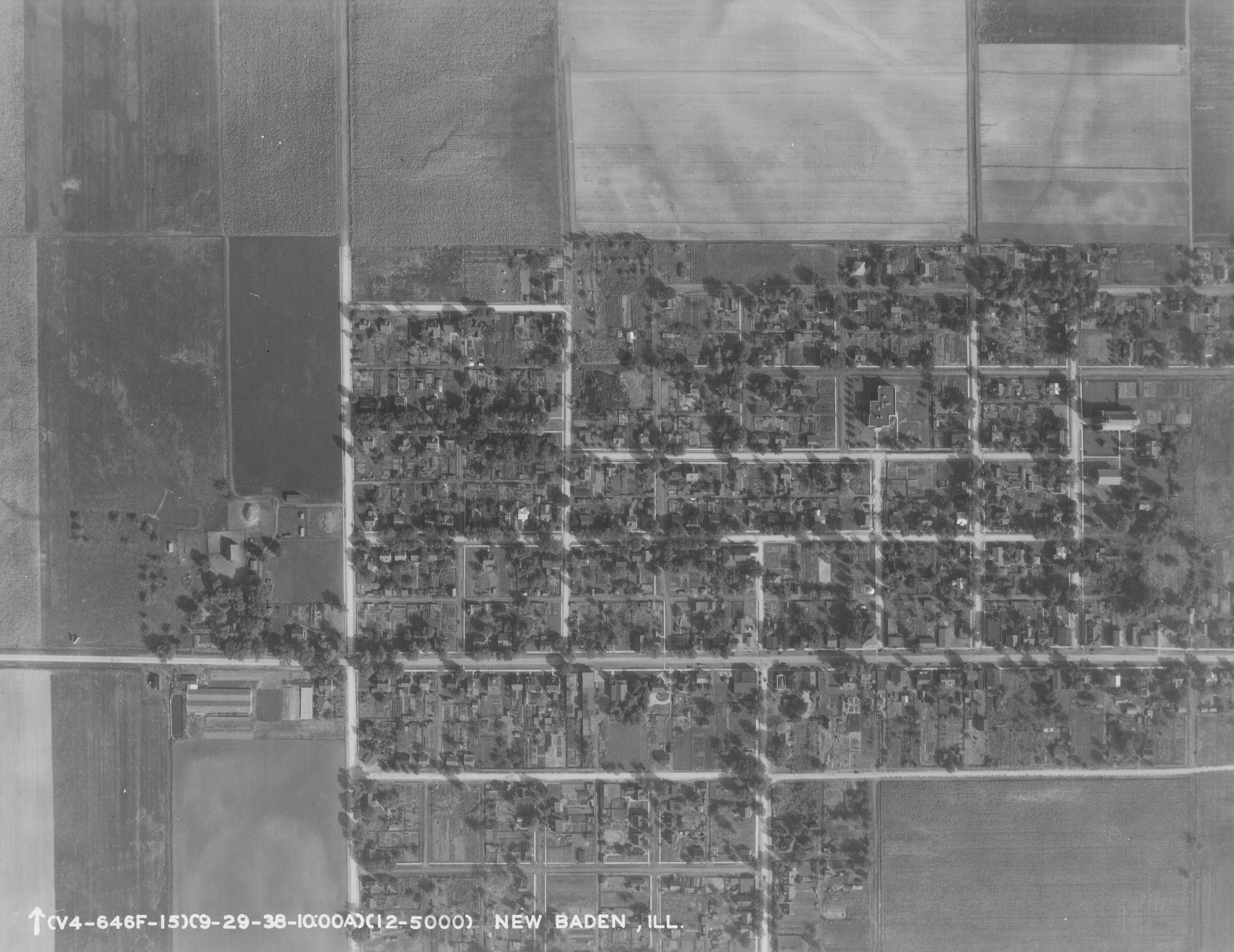
New Baden in 1938

New Baden is named after the historical territory of Baden, Germany. It was founded in 1855, remaining a small village until struck by a devastating tornado in 1896. Neighboring communities contributed to the rebuilding, creating a larger, more modern town which began to thrive, its success coinciding with the end of the long depression.

== Geography ==
According to the 2021 census gazetteer files, New Baden has a total area of 1.83 square miles (4.74 km^{2}), all land.

== Demographics ==
Historical population
| Census | Pop. | Note | %± |
|---|---|---|---|
| 1900 | 510 | | — |
| 1910 | 1,372 | | 169.0% |
| 1920 | 1,550 | | 13.0% |
| 1930 | 1,243 | | −19.8% |
| 1940 | 1,176 | | −5.4% |
| 1950 | 1,428 | | 21.4% |
| 1960 | 1,464 | | 2.5% |
| 1970 | 1,953 | | 33.4% |
| 1980 | 2,476 | | 26.8% |
| 1990 | 2,602 | | 5.1% |
| 2000 | 3,001 | | 15.3% |
| 2010 | 3,349 | | 11.6% |
| 2020 | 3,428 | | 2.4% |
U.S. Decennial Census

=== Racial and ethnic composition ===
Racial composition as of the 2020 census
| Race | Number | Percent |
|---|---|---|
| White | 2,929 | 85.4% |
| Black or African American | 91 | 2.7% |
| American Indian and Alaska Native | 22 | 0.6% |
| Asian | 29 | 0.8% |
| Native Hawaiian and Other Pacific Islander | 2 | 0.1% |
| Some other race | 123 | 3.6% |
| Two or more races | 232 | 6.8% |
| Hispanic or Latino (of any race) | 175 | 5.1% |

=== 2020 census ===
As of the 2020 census, New Baden had a population of 3,428. The median age was 36.5 years. 25.1% of residents were under the age of 18 and 15.1% were 65 years of age or older. For every 100 females, there were 96.2 males, and for every 100 females age 18 and over, there were 94.8 males age 18 and over.

0.0% of residents lived in urban areas, while 100.0% lived in rural areas.

There were 1,265 households in New Baden, of which 36.3% had children under the age of 18 living in them. Of all households, 53.0% were married-couple households, 16.8% were households with a male householder and no spouse or partner present, and 23.0% were households with a female householder and no spouse or partner present. About 23.3% of all households were made up of individuals, and 10.1% had someone living alone who was 65 years of age or older.

There were 1,347 housing units at an average density of 738.08 per square mile (284.97/km^{2}), of which 6.1% were vacant. The homeowner vacancy rate was 1.0% and the rental vacancy rate was 8.3%. The population density was 1,878.36 inhabitants per square mile (725.24/km^{2}), and there were 767 families residing in the village.

=== Income and poverty ===
The median income for a household in the village was $79,412, and the median income for a family was $93,875. Males had a median income of $60,154 versus $40,308 for females. The per capita income for the village was $43,061. About 2.9% of families and 5.5% of the population were below the poverty line, including 8.5% of those under age 18 and none of those age 65 or over.

== Notable people ==
- Brent Brede, professional baseball player
- Paul Lusk, professional basketball player
- Bertha Weber, composer
