= Illinois's 12th congressional district =

U.S. House district for Illinois

Coordinates: 38°00′N 89°15′W

- Interactive map of district boundaries since January 3, 2023
- Representative: Mike Bost; R–Murphysboro
- Area: 14,296.2 mi^{2} (37,027 km^{2})
- Distribution: 75.4% urban; 24.6% rural
- Population (2025): 740,908
- Median household income: $70,531
- Ethnicity: 86.9% White; 4.9% Black; 3.9% Two or more races; 2.8% Hispanic; 1.0% Asian; 0.5% other
- Cook PVI: R+22

The 12th congressional district of Illinois is a congressional district in the southern part of U.S. state of Illinois. It has been represented by Republican Mike Bost since 2015. With a Cook Partisan Voting Index of R+22, it is the most Republican district in Illinois.

== History ==
=== 2011 redistricting ===
The district covers parts of Madison and St. Clair counties, and all of Alexander, Franklin, Hamilton, Jackson, Jefferson, Monroe, Perry, Pulaski, Randolph, Union and Williamson counties, as of the 2011 redistricting which followed the 2010 census. All or parts of Belleville, Cahokia, Carbondale, Collinsville, East St. Louis, Granite City, Herrin, Marion, Mt. Vernon, O'Fallon, Shiloh and Swansea are included. The representatives for these districts were elected in the 2012 primary and general elections, and the boundaries became effective on January 5, 2013.

== Composition ==
For the 118th and successive Congresses (based on redistricting following the 2020 census), the district contains all or portions of the following counties, townships, and municipalities:

Alexander County (5)

All five municipalities

Clark County (19)

All 19 townships and municipalities

Clay County (18)

All 18 townships and municipalities

Clinton County (32)

All 32 townships and municipalities

Coles County (13)

Ashmore, Ashmore Township, Charleston (part, also 15th), Charleston Township (part, also 15th), East Oakland Township, Hutton Township, Lafayette Township (part, also 15th), Lerna, Mattoon (part, also 15th), Morgan Township, Oakland, Paradise Township, Pleasant Grove Township

Crawford County (16)

All 16 townships and municipalities

Cumberland County (14)

All 14 townships and municipalities

Edwards County (5)

All five municipalities

Effingham County (25)

All 25 townships and municipalities

Gallatin County (17)

All 17 townships and municipalities

Hamilton County (17)

All 17 townships and municipalities

Hardin County (3)

All three townships and municipalities

Jackson County (27)

All 27 townships and municipalities

Jasper County (18)

All 18 townships and municipalities

Jefferson County (25)

All 25 townships and municipalities

Johnson County (8)

All eight townships and municipalities

Lawrence County (14)

All 14 townships and municipalities

Marion County (31)

All 31 townships and municipalities

Massac County (3)

All three townships and municipalities

Monroe County (6)

All six townships and municipalities

Perry County (6)

All six townships and municipalities

Pope County (2)

All two townships and municipalities

Pulaski County (7)

All seven townships and municipalities

Randolph County (14)

All 14 townships and municipalities

Saline County (20)

All 20 townships and municipalities

St. Clair County (33)

Belleville (part, also 13th), Caseyville (part, also 13th), Engelmann Township, Dupo (part, also 13th; shared with Monroe County), Fairview Heights (part, also 13th), Fayetteville, Fayetteville Township, Freeburg, Freeburg Township, Lebanon, Lebanon Township, Lenzburg, Lenzburg Township, Marissa, Marissa Township, Mascoutah, Mascoutah Township, Millstadt, Millstadt Township, New Athens, New Athens Township, New Baden (part, shared with Clinton County), O'Fallon (part, also 13th), O'Fallon Township (part, also 13th), Prairie du Long Township, Shiloh (part, also 13th), Shiloh Valley Township, Smithton, Smithton Township, St. Libory, Stookey Township, Sugar Loaf Township (part, also 13th), Summerfield

Union County (4)

All four townships and municipalities

Wabash County (4)

All four townships and municipalities

Wayne County (29)

All 29 townships and municipalities

White County (20)

All 20 townships and municipalities

Williamson County (16)

All 16 townships and municipalities

== Recent election results from statewide races ==
Year	Office	Results
2008	President	McCain 54–44%
2012	President	Romney 63–37%
2016	President	Trump 69–26%
2016	Senate	Kirk 56–39%
2016	Comptroller (Spec.)	Munger 63–32%
2018	Governor	Rauner 57–33%
2018	Attorney General	Harold 67–30%
2018	Secretary of State	Helland 51–47%
2018	Comptroller	Senger 61–36%
2018	Treasurer	Dodge 63–34%
2020	President	Trump 70–28%
2020	Senate	Curran 66–31%
2022	Senate	Salvi 68–30%
2022	Governor	Bailey 73–25%
2022	Attorney General	DeVore 72–25%
2022	Secretary of State	Brady 72–25%
2022	Comptroller	Teresi 68–30%
2022	Treasurer	Demmer 72–26%
2024	President	Trump 71–27%

== List of members representing the district ==
Name	Party	Years	Cong– ress	Electoral history	Counties
District created March 4, 1863
William Ralls Morrison (Waterloo)	Democratic	March 4, 1863 – March 3, 1865	38th	Elected in 1862. Lost re-election.	1863–1873; Clinton, Madison, Monroe, Randolph, St. Clair, and Washington
Jehu Baker (Belleville)	Republican	March 4, 1865 – March 3, 1869	39th 40th	Elected in 1864. Re-elected in 1866. Retired.	1863–1873; Clinton, Madison, Monroe, Randolph, St. Clair, and Washington
John B. Hay (Belleville)	Republican	March 4, 1869 – March 3, 1873	41st 42nd	Elected in 1868. Re-elected in 1870. Redistricted to the 17th district and lost re-election.	1863–1873; Clinton, Madison, Monroe, Randolph, St. Clair, and Washington
James Carroll Robinson (Springfield)	Democratic	March 4, 1873 – March 3, 1875	43rd	Redistricted from the 8th district and re-elected in 1872. Retired.	1873–1883; Cass, Christian, Menard, Morgan, Sangamon, and Scott
William McKendree Springer (Springfield)	Democratic	March 4, 1875 – March 3, 1883	44th 45th 46th 47th	Elected in 1874. Re-elected in 1876. Re-elected in 1878. Re-elected in 1880. Redistricted to the 13th district.	1873–1883; Cass, Christian, Menard, Morgan, Sangamon, and Scott
James M. Riggs (Winchester)	Democratic	March 4, 1883 – March 3, 1887	48th 49th	Elected in 1882. Re-elected in 1884. Retired.	1883–1895 [data missing]
George A. Anderson (Quincy)	Democratic	March 4, 1887 – March 3, 1889	50th	Elected in 1886. Retired.	1883–1895 [data missing]
Scott Wike (Pittsfield)	Democratic	March 4, 1889 – March 3, 1893	51st 52nd	Elected in 1888. Re-elected in 1890. Lost renomination.	1883–1895 [data missing]
John James McDannold (Mount Sterling)	Democratic	March 4, 1893– March 3, 1895	53rd	Elected in 1892. Retired.	1883–1895 [data missing]
Joseph Gurney Cannon (Danville)	Republican	March 4, 1895– March 3, 1903	54th 55th 56th 57th	Redistricted from the 15th district and re-elected in 1894. Re-elected in 1896. Re-elected in 1898. Re-elected in 1900. Redistricted to the 18th district.	1895–1903; Iroquois, Kankakee, Vermillion, and Will
Charles Eugene Fuller (Belvidere)	Republican	March 4, 1903– March 3, 1913	58th 59th 60th 61st 62nd	Elected in 1902. Re-elected in 1904. Re-elected in 1906. Re-elected in 1908. Re-elected in 1910. Lost re-election.	1903–1913; Boone, DeKalb, Grundy, Kendall, LaSalle, and Winnebago
William H. Hinebaugh (Ottawa)	Progressive	March 4, 1913– March 3, 1915	63rd	Elected in 1912. Lost re-election.	1913–1949; Boone, DeKalb, Grundy, Kendall, LaSalle, and Winnebago
Charles Eugene Fuller (Belvidere)	Republican	March 4, 1915– June 25, 1926	64th 65th 66th 67th 68th 69th	Elected again in 1914. Re-elected in 1916. Re-elected in 1918. Re-elected in 1920. Re-elected in 1922. Re-elected in 1924. Died.	1913–1949; Boone, DeKalb, Grundy, Kendall, LaSalle, and Winnebago
Vacant		June 25, 1926– March 3, 1927	69th		1913–1949; Boone, DeKalb, Grundy, Kendall, LaSalle, and Winnebago
John T. Buckbee (Rockford)	Republican	March 4, 1927– April 23, 1936	70th 71st 72nd 73rd 74th	Elected in 1926. Re-elected in 1928. Re-elected in 1930. Re-elected in 1932. Re-elected in 1934. Died.	1913–1949; Boone, DeKalb, Grundy, Kendall, LaSalle, and Winnebago
Vacant		April 23, 1936– January 3, 1937	74th		1913–1949; Boone, DeKalb, Grundy, Kendall, LaSalle, and Winnebago
Noah M. Mason (Oglesby)	Republican	January 3, 1937– January 3, 1949	75th 76th 77th 78th 79th 80th	Elected in 1936. Re-elected in 1938. Re-elected in 1940. Re-elected in 1942. Re-elected in 1944. Re-elected in 1946. Redistricted to the 15th district.	1913–1949; Boone, DeKalb, Grundy, Kendall, LaSalle, and Winnebago
Edgar A. Jonas (Chicago)	Republican	January 3, 1949– January 3, 1955	81st 82nd 83rd	Elected in 1948. Re-elected in 1950. Re-elected in 1952. Lost re-election.	1949–1953; Cook
Edgar A. Jonas (Chicago)	Republican	January 3, 1949– January 3, 1955	81st 82nd 83rd	Elected in 1948. Re-elected in 1950. Re-elected in 1952. Lost re-election.	1953–1963; Cook
Charles A. Boyle (Chicago)	Democratic	January 3, 1955– November 4, 1959	84th 85th 86th	Elected in 1954. Re-elected in 1956. Re-elected in 1958. Died.	1953–1963; Cook
Vacant		November 4, 1959– January 3, 1961	86th		1953–1963; Cook
Edward Rowan Finnegan (Chicago)	Democratic	January 3, 1961– January 3, 1963	87th	Elected in 1960. Redistricted to the 9th district.	1953–1963; Cook
Robert McClory (Lake Bluff)	Republican	January 3, 1963– January 3, 1973	88th 89th 90th 91st 92nd	Elected in 1962. Re-elected in 1964. Re-elected in 1966. Re-elected in 1968. Re-elected in 1970. Redistricted to the 13th district.	1963–1967; Boone, Lake, and McHenry
Robert McClory (Lake Bluff)	Republican	January 3, 1963– January 3, 1973	88th 89th 90th 91st 92nd	Elected in 1962. Re-elected in 1964. Re-elected in 1966. Re-elected in 1968. Re-elected in 1970. Redistricted to the 13th district.	1967–1973; Cook, Lake, and McHenry
Phil Crane (McHenry)	Republican	January 3, 1973– January 3, 1993	93rd 94th 95th 96th 97th 98th 99th 100th 101st 102nd	Elected in 1972. Re-elected in 1974. Re-elected in 1976. Re-elected in 1978. Re-elected in 1980. Re-elected in 1982. Re-elected in 1984. Re-elected in 1986. Re-elected in 1988. Re-elected in 1990. Redistricted to the 8th district.	1973–1983; Cook and Lake
Phil Crane (McHenry)	Republican	January 3, 1973– January 3, 1993	93rd 94th 95th 96th 97th 98th 99th 100th 101st 102nd	Elected in 1972. Re-elected in 1974. Re-elected in 1976. Re-elected in 1978. Re-elected in 1980. Re-elected in 1982. Re-elected in 1984. Re-elected in 1986. Re-elected in 1988. Re-elected in 1990. Redistricted to the 8th district.	1983–1993; Cook, Lake, and McHenry
Jerry Costello (Belleville)	Democratic	January 3, 1993– January 3, 2013	103rd 104th 105th 106th 107th 108th 109th 110th 111th 112th	Redistricted from the 21st district and re-elected in 1992. Re-elected in 1994. Re-elected in 1996. Re-elected in 1998. Re-elected in 2000. Re-elected in 2002. Re-elected in 2004. Re-elected in 2006. Re-elected in 2008. Re-elected in 2010. Retired.	1993–2003; Alexander, Jackson, Madison, Monroe, Perry, Randolph, St. Clair, Union, and Williamson
Jerry Costello (Belleville)	Democratic	January 3, 1993– January 3, 2013	103rd 104th 105th 106th 107th 108th 109th 110th 111th 112th	Redistricted from the 21st district and re-elected in 1992. Re-elected in 1994. Re-elected in 1996. Re-elected in 1998. Re-elected in 2000. Re-elected in 2002. Re-elected in 2004. Re-elected in 2006. Re-elected in 2008. Re-elected in 2010. Retired.	2003–2013 Alexander, Franklin, Jackson, Madison, Monroe, Perry, Pulaski, Randolph, St. Clair, Union, Williamson
William Enyart (Belleville)	Democratic	January 3, 2013– January 3, 2015	113th	Elected in 2012. Lost re-election.	2013–2023 Alexander, Franklin, Jackson, Jefferson, Madison, Monroe, Perry, Pulaski, Randolph, St. Clair, Union, and Williamson
Mike Bost (Murphysboro)	Republican	January 3, 2015– present	114th 115th 116th 117th 118th 119th	Elected in 2014. Re-elected in 2016. Re-elected in 2018. Re-elected in 2020. Re-elected in 2022. Re-elected in 2024. Re-elected in 2026.	2013–2023 Alexander, Franklin, Jackson, Jefferson, Madison, Monroe, Perry, Pulaski, Randolph, St. Clair, Union, and Williamson
Mike Bost (Murphysboro)	Republican	January 3, 2015– present	114th 115th 116th 117th 118th 119th	Elected in 2014. Re-elected in 2016. Re-elected in 2018. Re-elected in 2020. Re-elected in 2022. Re-elected in 2024. Re-elected in 2026.	2023–present Alexander, Clark, Clay, Clinton, Coles (part), Crawford, Cumberland, Edwards, Effingham, Franklin, Gallatin, Hamilton, Hardin, Jackson, Jasper, Jefferson, Johnson, Lawrence, Marion, Massac, Monroe, Perry, Pope, Pulaski, Randolph, Richland, Saline, St. Clair (part), Union, Wabash, Washington, Wayne, White, and Williamson

== Elections ==
=== 2012 ===
Illinois's 12th congressional district election results, 2012
Party	Candidate	Votes	%
Democratic	William Enyart	157,000	51.7
Republican	Jason Plummer	129,902	42.7
Green	Paula Bradshaw	17,045	5.6
Write-in	Shon-Tiyon Horton	2	0.0
Total votes		303,947	100

=== 2014 ===
Illinois's 12th congressional district, 2014
Party	Candidate	Votes	%
Republican	Mike Bost	110,038	52.5
Democratic	William Enyart (incumbent)	87,860	41.9
Green	Paula Bradshaw	11,840	5.6
Total votes		209,738	100.0
Republican gain from Democratic			

=== 2016 ===
Illinois's 12th congressional district, 2016
Party	Candidate	Votes	%
Republican	Mike Bost (incumbent)	169,976	54.3
Democratic	C.J. Baricevic	124,246	39.7
Green	Paula Bradshaw	18,780	6.0
Total votes		313,002	100.0
Republican hold			

=== 2018 ===
Illinois's 12th congressional district, 2018
Party	Candidate	Votes	%
Republican	Mike Bost (incumbent)	134,884	51.6
Democratic	Brendan Kelly	118,724	45.4
Green	Randall Auxier	7,935	3.0
Total votes		261,543	100.0
Republican hold			

=== 2020 ===
Illinois's 12th congressional district, 2020
Party	Candidate	Votes	%	±%
Republican	Mike Bost (incumbent)	194,839	60.43	+8.86%
Democratic	Raymond Lenzi	127,577	39.57	−5.82%
Total votes		322,416	100.0	
Republican hold				

=== 2022 ===
Illinois's 12th congressional district, 2022
Party	Candidate	Votes	%
Republican	Mike Bost (incumbent)	218,379	75.00
Democratic	Chip Markel	72,791	25.00
Write-in		1	0.00
Total votes		291,171	100.0
Republican hold			

=== 2024 ===
Illinois's 12th congressional district, 2024
Party	Candidate	Votes	%	±%
Republican	Mike Bost (incumbent)	272,754	74.19	−0.81%
Democratic	Brian Roberts	94,875	25.81	+0.81%
Total votes		367,629	100.0	
Republican hold				

2026

== See also ==
- Illinois's congressional districts
- List of United States congressional districts

== Sources ==
- Martis, Kenneth C. (1989). The Historical Atlas of Political Parties in the United States Congress. New York: Macmillan Publishing Company.
- Martis, Kenneth C. (1982). The Historical Atlas of United States Congressional Districts. New York: Macmillan Publishing Company.
- Congressional Biographical Directory of the United States 1774–present, bioguide.congress.gov; accessed November 10, 2016.
