= Smithton Township =

Smithton Township may refer to:

- Smithton Township, St. Clair County, Illinois
- Smithton Township, Pettis County, Missouri

== See also ==
- Smithton (disambiguation)
