= Lenzburg (disambiguation) =

Lenzburg is a town in Switzerland. The term may also refer to:

Switzerland

- Lenzburg (district), a district of the Canton of Aargau, of which Lenzburg is the capital
- Schloss Lenzburg, a castle above the town of Lenzburg
- Regionalbus Lenzburg AG, a local bus company

United States

- Lenzburg, Illinois
- Lenzburg Township, St. Clair County, Illinois
