= Millstadt =

Millstadt is the name of a village and a township in St. Clair County, Illinois, in the United States:

- Millstadt, Illinois
- Millstadt Township, St. Clair County, Illinois

== See also ==
- Millstatt
