= Fayetteville Township =

Fayetteville Township may refer to the following townships in the United States:

- Fayetteville Township, Washington County, Arkansas
- Fayetteville Township, St. Clair County, Illinois
