= North Dupo, Illinois =

- Unincorporated community
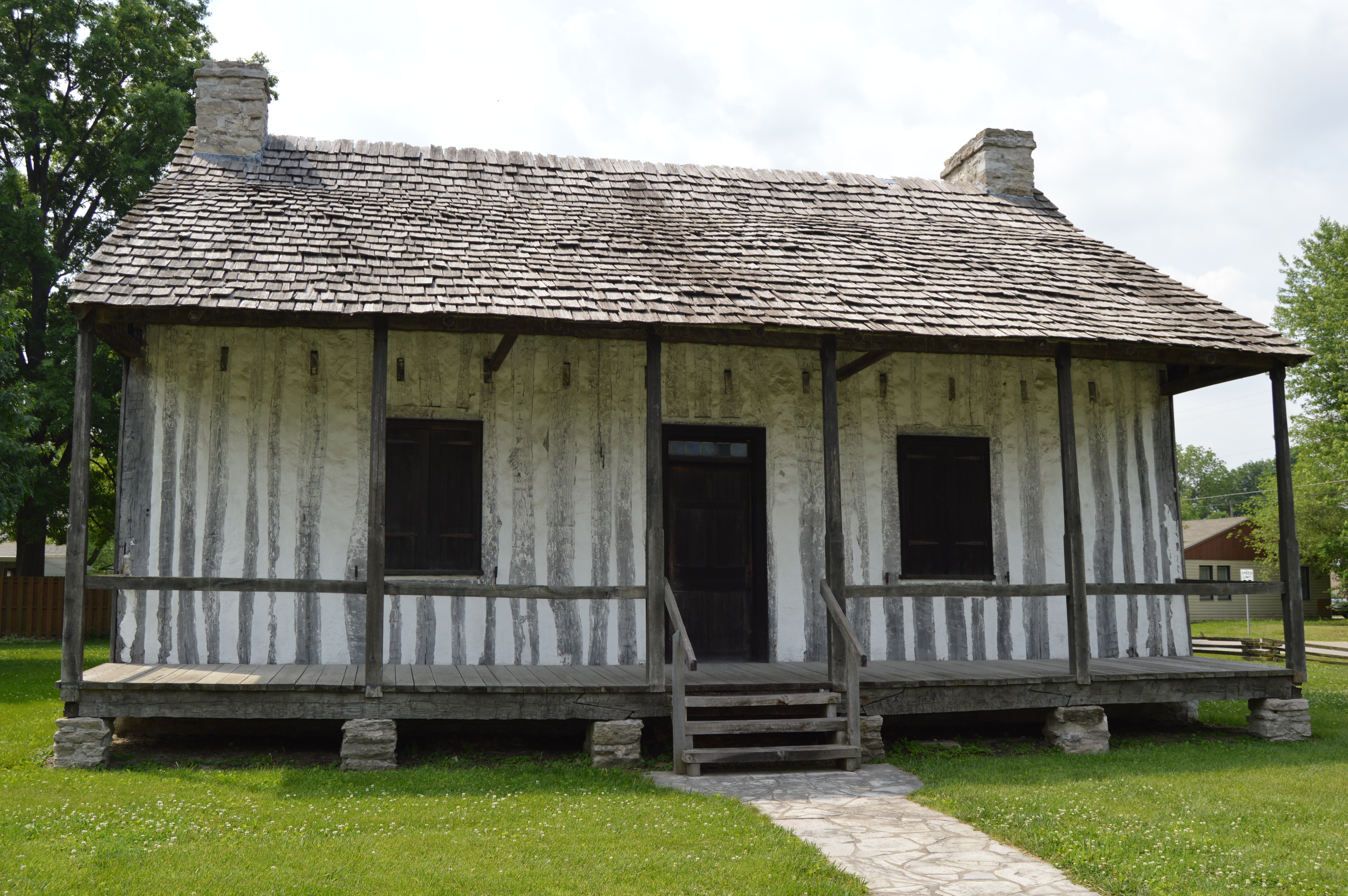
- Pierre Martin House

- Location within Illinois
- Coordinates: 38°32′58″N 90°12′02″W
- Country: United States
- State: Illinois
- County: St. Clair
- Elevation: 410 ft (120 m)
- Time zone: UTC-6 (Central (CST))
  - Summer (DST): UTC-5 (CDT)
- Area code: 618
- GNIS feature ID: 426445

North Dupo is an unincorporated community in Sugarloaf Township, St. Clair County, Illinois, United States. North Dupo is located along Illinois Route 3 south of Cahokia and north of Dupo, bordering both villages. The Pierre Martin House, which is listed on the National Register of Historic Places, is located in North Dupo.
