= Shiloh School District =

- Shiloh Community Unit School District 1, a unit school district in Hume, Edgar County, Illinois
- Shiloh Village School District 85, a grade school district in Shiloh, St. Clair County, Illinois
