= East Carondelet, Illinois =

East Carondelet
- Village
- Location of East Carondelet in St. Clair County, Illinois.
- Coordinates: 38°32′12″N 90°14′43″W
- Country: United States
- State: Illinois
- County: St. Clair

Area
  - Total: 1.35 sq mi (3.49 km^{2})
  - Land: 1.18 sq mi (3.05 km^{2})
  - Water: 0.17 sq mi (0.44 km^{2})
- Elevation: 397 ft (121 m)

Population (2020)
  - Total: 390
  - Density: 331/sq mi (127.9/km^{2})
- Time zone: UTC-6 (CST)
  - Summer (DST): UTC-5 (CDT)
- ZIP code: 62240
- Area code: 618
- FIPS code: 17-21618
- GNIS ID: 2398773

East Carondelet is a village in St. Clair County, Illinois, United States. As of the 2020 census, East Carondelet had a population of 390.

== History ==
In 1873, the St. Louis and Cairo Railroad (then the Cairo and St. Louis Railroad) opened a track and station through East Carondelet. The line was later bought in 1886 by the Mobile and Ohio Railroad.

== Geography ==
According to the 2010 census, East Carondelet has a total area of 1.673 square miles (4.33 km^{2}), of which 1.21 square miles (3.13 km^{2}) (or 72.33%) is land and 0.463 square miles (1.20 km^{2}) (or 27.67%) is water.

== Demographics ==
Historical population
Census	Pop.	Note	%±
1880	386		—
1890	404		4.7%
1900	222		−45.0%
1910	212		−4.5%
1920	311		46.7%
1930	378		21.5%
1940	416		10.1%
1950	401		−3.6%
1960	463		15.5%
1970	542		17.1%
1980	628		15.9%
1990	630		0.3%
2000	267		−57.6%
2010	499		86.9%
2020	390		−21.8%
U.S. Decennial Census

As of the census of 2000, there were 267 people, 94 households, and 68 families residing in the village. The population density was 213.5 inhabitants per square mile (82.4/km^{2}). There were 105 housing units at an average density of 84.0 per square mile (32.4/km^{2}). The racial makeup of the village was 92.51% White, 3.37% African American, 1.87% Native American, 0.37% from other races, and 1.87% from two or more races.

There were 94 households, out of which 37.2% had children under the age of 18 living with them, 54.3% were married couples living together, 16.0% had a female householder with no husband present, and 26.6% were non-families. 22.3% of all households were made up of individuals, and 7.4% had someone living alone who was 65 years of age or older. The average household size was 2.84 and the average family size was 3.28.

In the village, the population was spread out, with 29.6% under the age of 18, 6.4% from 18 to 24, 26.6% from 25 to 44, 25.5% from 45 to 64, and 12.0% who were 65 years of age or older. The median age was 36 years. For every 100 females, there were 92.1 males. For every 100 females age 18 and over, there were 91.8 males.

The median income for a household in the village was $36,071, and the median income for a family was $39,583. Males had a median income of $35,500 versus $21,875 for females. The per capita income for the village was $13,402. About 3.8% of families and 2.9% of the population were below the poverty line, including 6.3% of those under the age of eighteen and 8.3% of those 65 or over.

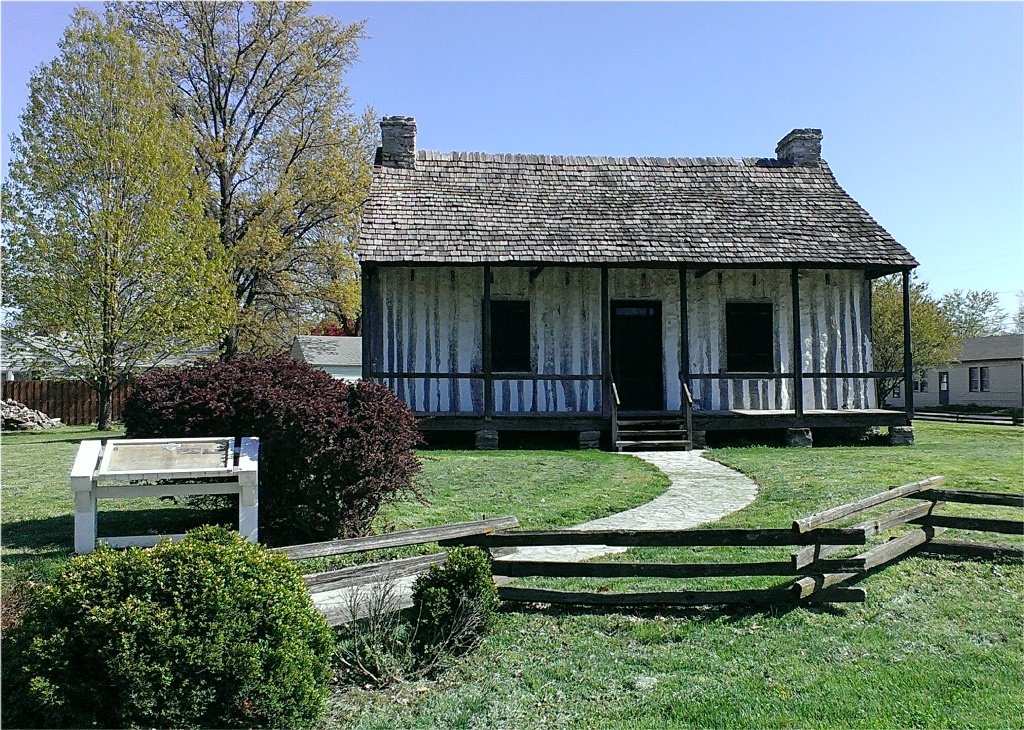
Martin–Boismenue House

== Historic sites ==
East Carondelet is the site of the Martin–Boismenue House, a c. 1790 house owned by the Illinois Historic Preservation Agency.
