= Dupo, Illinois =

Dupo
- Village
- Location of Dupo in St. Clair County, Illinois.
- Coordinates: 38°30′47″N 90°13′36″W
- Country: United States
- State: Illinois
- County: St. Clair

Area
  - Total: 6.42 sq mi (16.64 km^{2})
  - Land: 6.40 sq mi (16.58 km^{2})
  - Water: 0.023 sq mi (0.06 km^{2})
- Elevation: 410 ft (120 m)

Population (2020)
  - Total: 3,996
  - Density: 624.1/sq mi (240.96/km^{2})
- Time zone: UTC-6 (CST)
  - Summer (DST): UTC-5 (CDT)
- ZIP code: 62239
- Area code: 618
- FIPS code: 17-21254
- GNIS ID: 2398759
- Website: www.villageofdupo.org

Dupo is a village in St. Clair County, Illinois, United States. As of the 2020 census, Dupo had a population of 3,996. The village was settled in about 1750 and was incorporated in 1907. Its modern name, adopted in the early 20th century, is shortened from Prairie du Pont ("Bridge Prairie").

== History ==
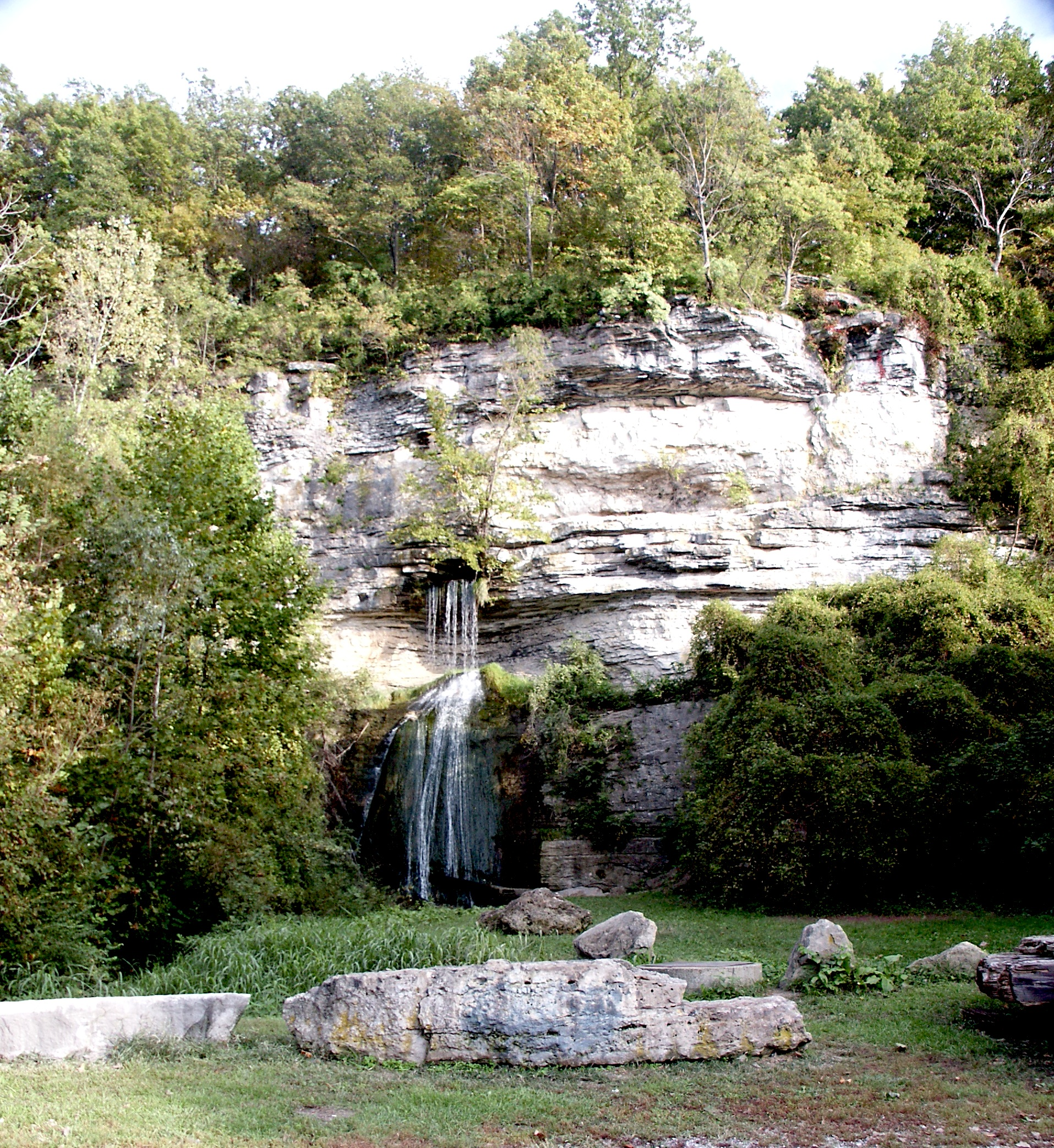
Falling Springs, or St. Michael's Bluff, where the Sulpician mission established a mill in the 18th century.

In the Mississippian period, Dupo was the site of one of several multi-mound communities in the floodplain near Cahokia. These mounds remained standing at least as recently as 1915.

The French village of Prairie du Pont was first settled around 1750 by townspeople moving out of Cahokia. It was located at a bridge over what is now known as Prairie du Pont Creek, on the trail from Cahokia to Kaskaskia, which was the first wagon road in Illinois. The settlement may have been motivated by Dupo being located 10–12 feet higher than Cahokia and thus being more protected from floods on the Mississippi River. The Sulpician mission established a mill near the bridge, which became the core of the town's development. By 1765 fourteen families lived in Prairie du Pont. The village's growth was further spurred by the prominent local citizen Antoine Girardin, who parceled off parts of the Cahokia commons to residents of Prairie du Pont.

The early French village at Prairie du Pont followed a tripartite system of land ownership that was common in the Illinois country: private houses in a row, "common fields" enclosed by a shared fence but divided into narrow strips owned and farmed by a particular family, and the actual commons used jointly by the inhabitants for grazing their livestock. The village elected a village council, or syndic, to maintain the fence around the common fields.

Among the early inhabitants of Prairie du Pont was the noted gunsmith Philip Creamer, who settled in the area in 1805. Some parts of the historic Prairie du Pont community, such as the Pierre Martin House, are now located in unincorporated North Dupo, Illinois.

A Prairie du Pont school district was established by legislative enactment in 1847, to be funded by leases of the village commons, but no school was actually held in the village until 1861, due to inadequate funds.

In the 1880s, the town of Prairie du Pont had about 50 inhabitants, of whom about 20% were African American.

The modern town of Dupo was platted in 1905 and incorporated in 1907. It grew around the Missouri Pacific Railroad switching yards. At the instigation of the railroad, the name was shortened from Prairie du Pont to Dupo.

In 1928, the Ohio Oil Company discovered oil in Dupo. This led to an oil boom in the town, in which oil wells were sunk in people's front yards. However, the oil boom was short-lived and the economy of the town returned to depending primarily on the rail yard.

In 1997, the town considered switching its name back to Prairie Du Pont to put the industrial period behind it and better attract tourism, but ultimately left its name unchanged.

In 2019, a Union Pacific freight train derailed at the Dupo Yard, leading to the evacuation of several neighborhoods in Dupo. The crash was caused by a 1.5 miles (2.4 km)-long freight train breaking in half and the two halves then colliding. A tank car full of methyl isobutyl ketone caught fire.

== Geography ==
Dupo is located in the American Bottom floodplain of the Mississippi River.

According to the 2010 census, Dupo has a total area of 4.42 square miles (11.45 km^{2}), all land.

== Demographics ==
Historical population
| Census | Pop. | Note | %± |
|---|---|---|---|
| 1910 | 433 | | — |
| 1920 | 1,393 | | 221.7% |
| 1930 | 2,082 | | 49.5% |
| 1940 | 2,073 | | −0.4% |
| 1950 | 2,239 | | 8.0% |
| 1960 | 2,937 | | 31.2% |
| 1970 | 2,842 | | −3.2% |
| 1980 | 3,039 | | 6.9% |
| 1990 | 3,164 | | 4.1% |
| 2000 | 3,933 | | 24.3% |
| 2010 | 4,138 | | 5.2% |
| 2020 | 3,996 | | −3.4% |
U.S. Decennial Census

=== Racial and ethnic composition ===
Dupo village, Illinois – Racial and ethnic composition Note: the US Census treats Hispanic/Latino as an ethnic category. This table excludes Latinos from the racial categories and assigns them to a separate category. Hispanics/Latinos may be of any race.
| Race / Ethnicity (NH = Non-Hispanic) | Pop 2000 | Pop 2010 | Pop 2020 | % 2000 | % 2010 | % 2020 |
|---|---|---|---|---|---|---|
| White alone (NH) | 3,800 | 3,890 | 3,390 | 96.62% | 94.01% | 84.83% |
| Black or African American alone (NH) | 46 | 95 | 196 | 1.17% | 2.30% | 4.90% |
| Native American or Alaska Native alone (NH) | 12 | 15 | 10 | 0.31% | 0.36% | 0.25% |
| Asian alone (NH) | 10 | 12 | 20 | 0.25% | 0.29% | 0.50% |
| Native Hawaiian or Pacific Islander alone (NH) | 0 | 0 | 2 | 0.00% | 0.00% | 0.05% |
| Other race alone (NH) | 10 | 1 | 17 | 0.25% | 0.02% | 0.43% |
| Mixed race or Multiracial (NH) | 28 | 68 | 240 | 0.71% | 1.64% | 6.01% |
| Hispanic or Latino (any race) | 27 | 57 | 121 | 0.69% | 1.38% | 3.03% |
| Total | 3,933 | 4,138 | 3,996 | 100.00% | 100.00% | 100.00% |

=== 2020 census ===
As of the 2020 census, Dupo had a population of 3,996. The median age was 39.0 years. 23.4% of residents were under the age of 18 and 14.8% of residents were 65 years of age or older. For every 100 females there were 96.5 males, and for every 100 females age 18 and over there were 94.2 males age 18 and over.

97.4% of residents lived in urban areas, while 2.6% lived in rural areas.

There were 1,646 households in Dupo, of which 29.3% had children under the age of 18 living in them. Of all households, 38.9% were married-couple households, 20.7% were households with a male householder and no spouse or partner present, and 30.3% were households with a female householder and no spouse or partner present. About 29.9% of all households were made up of individuals and 11.7% had someone living alone who was 65 years of age or older.

There were 1,844 housing units, of which 10.7% were vacant. The homeowner vacancy rate was 2.3% and the rental vacancy rate was 6.4%.

Racial composition as of the 2020 census
| Race | Number | Percent |
|---|---|---|
| White | 3,429 | 85.8% |
| Black or African American | 196 | 4.9% |
| American Indian and Alaska Native | 11 | 0.3% |
| Asian | 20 | 0.5% |
| Native Hawaiian and Other Pacific Islander | 2 | 0.1% |
| Some other race | 40 | 1.0% |
| Two or more races | 298 | 7.5% |

=== 2010 census ===
In 2010 there were 4,138 people, 1,650 households, and 1,142 families residing in the village. The Population Density was 655 people per square mile(252.8/km^{2}). There were 1,863 housing units at an average density of 294.8 per square mile (113.8/km^{2}). The racial makeup of the village was 94.9% White, 2.3% African American, 0.4% Native American, 0.3% Asian, 0.3% from other races, and 1.8% from two or more races. Hispanic or Latino of any race were 1.4% of the population.

There were 1,650 households, out of which 31.3% had children under the age of 18 living with them, 43.8% were married couples living together, 17.7% had a female householder with no husband present with 10.8% of all households having a female householder with kids. 7.7% had a male householder with no husband present with 4.2% of all households having a male householder with no wife and kids. 30.8% of all households were non-families. 25.3% of all households were made up of individuals, and 9.4% had someone living alone who was 65 years of age or older. The average household size was 2.51 and the average family size was 2.91.

In Dupo, 25.3% of the population was under 18, 6.8% from 20 to 24, 28.5% from 25 to 44, 26.2% from 45 to 64 and 10.7% who were 65 years of age or older. The median age was 35 years, For every 100 females, there were 97.2 males. The median income for a household in the village was $45,203, and the median income for a family was $58,370. Males had an average income of $45,621 versus $32,628 for females. The Per Capita Income for the village was $24,404. About 14.0% of families and 14.9% of the population were below the poverty line, including 25.2% of those under 18 and 14.4% of those age 65 and over.

=== 2000 census ===
As of the 2000 census, there were 3,933 people, 1,557 households, and 1,063 families residing in the village. The population density was 888.6 inhabitants per square mile (343.1/km^{2}). There were 1,668 housing units at an average density of 376.9 per square mile (145.5/km^{2}). The racial makeup of the village was 97.20% White, 1.17% African American, 0.31% Native American, 0.25% Asian, 0.36% from other races, and 0.71% from two or more races. Hispanic or Latino of any race were 0.69% of the population.

There were 1,557 households, out of which 32.6% had children under the age of 18 living with them, 52.9% were married couples living together, 11.0% had a female householder with no husband present, and 31.7% were non-families. 26.1% of all households were made up of individuals, and 10.9% had someone living alone who was 65 years of age or older. The average household size was 2.53 and the average family size was 3.04.

In the village, the population was spread out, with 25.2% under the age of 18, 10.7% from 18 to 24, 30.5% from 25 to 44, 21.4% from 45 to 64, and 12.1% who were 65 years of age or older. The median age was 35 years. For every 100 females, there were 96.0 males. For every 100 females age 18 and over, there were 92.9 males.

The median income for a household in the village was $43,036, and the median income for a family was $47,000. Males had a median income of $35,529 versus $24,135 for females. The per capita income for the village was $18,505. About 2.9% of families and 4.3% of the population were below the poverty line, including 5.2% of those under age 18 and 3.8% of those age 65 or over.

== Education ==
Dupo is served by Dupo Community Unit School District and has one high school, Dupo High School.

== Notable people ==
- Candace Jordan, television personality, Playboy Playmate

== See also ==
- American Bottom
