= Warren Hacker =

American baseball player (1924–2002)

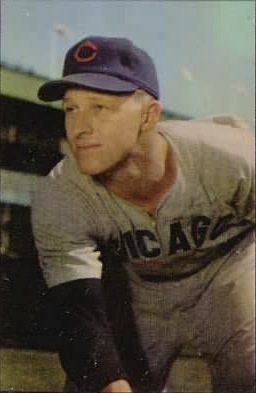
- Hacker, circa 1953
- Pitcher
- Born: November 21, 1924; Marissa, Illinois, U.S.
- Died: May 22, 2002 (aged 77); Lenzburg, Illinois, U.S.
- Batted: Right Threw: Right

MLB debut
- September 24, 1948, for the Chicago Cubs

Last MLB appearance
- September 29, 1961, for the Chicago White Sox

MLB statistics
- Win–loss record: 62–89
- Earned run average: 4.21
- Strikeouts: 557
- Stats at Baseball Reference

Teams
- Chicago Cubs (1948–1956); Cincinnati Redlegs (1957); Philadelphia Phillies (1957–1958); Chicago White Sox (1961)

Warren Louis Hacker (November 21, 1924 – May 22, 2002) was an American professional baseball player, a pitcher for the Chicago Cubs (1948–56), Cincinnati Redlegs (1957), Philadelphia Phillies (1957–58) and Chicago White Sox (1961). He was also the uncle of former Major League shortstop Rich Hacker.

Hacker's finished 23rd in voting for the National League Most Valuable Player Award in 1952 for leading the league in WHIP (.946) and hits allowed/9ip (7.01) and having a 15–9 win–loss record, 33 games pitched (20 started), 12 complete games, 5 shutouts, 5 games finished, 1 save, 185 innings pitched, 144 hits allowed, 56 runs allowed, 53 earned runs allowed, 17 home runs allowed, 31 walks allowed, 84 strikeouts, 1 hit batsmen, 1 wild pitch, 721 batters faced, 1 balk and a 2.58 ERA.

In 12 seasons Hacker had a 62–89 win loss record, 306 games pitched (157 started), 47 complete games, 6 shutouts, 76 games finished, 17 saves, 1,283 1/3 innings pitched, 1,297 hits allowed, 680 runs allowed, 601 earned runs allowed, 181 home runs allowed, 320 walks allowed, 557 strikeouts, 21 hit batsmen, 10 wild pitches, 5,438 batters faced, 1 balk, a 4.21 ERA and a 1.26 WHIP.

After leaving the major leagues in 1961, Hacker played for the Indianapolis Indians from 1962 to 1965, which he recalled as "maybe the best days I ever had in baseball." He then served as a minor-league pitching coach for the Oakland As from 1967 to 1971, and for much of the 1970s he was a pitching coach in the San Diego Padres' organization.

The native of Marissa, Illinois, died in 2002 in Lenzburg, Illinois, at the age of 77.
