= Smithton =

Smithton may refer to several places:

In the United Kingdom

- Smithton, Highland, a community near Culloden in Scotland.

In Australia

- Smithton, Tasmania
  - Smithton Airport

In the United States

- Smithton, Illinois
- Smithton Township, St. Clair County, Illinois
- Smithton, Missouri
- Smithton Township, Pettis County, Missouri
- Smithton, Pennsylvania
- Smithville, West Virginia, also known as Smithton
- Smithton High School, a high school in Smithton Missouri
