= Dupo Community Unit School District 196 =

Public school district in Dupo, Illinois, United States

Location
- 600 Louisa Avenue Dupo, Illinois; United States

District information
- Superintendent: Dr. Kelly Carpenter
- Schools: 3
- NCES District ID: 1712720

Students and staff
- Students: 1,040
- Teachers: 74
- District mascot: Tigers

Other information
- Website: Official website

Dupo Community Unit School District 196 is a School District in St. Clair County, Illinois, serving students in Dupo, Illinois.

== About ==
DUSD 196 is a member of the Cahokia Conference, a Prek-12 Sports Conference in Metro East. In 2015, The School District began issuing Dell Laptops to all of its students.

== Demographics ==
White	African American	Asian American	Latino	Two or More Races
86.8%	4.3%	0.2%	3.4%	4.8%

== List of Schools ==
- Bluffview Elementary School
- Dupo Community Junior High
- Dupo High School
