= Mascoutah Township, St. Clair County, Illinois =

Coordinates: 38°31′43″N 89°45′56″W

Mascoutah Township
- Township
- Location in St. Clair County

- St. Clair County's location in Illinois
- Country: United States
- State: Illinois
- County: St. Clair
- Established: November 6, 1883

Area
  - Total: 39.33 sq mi (101.9 km^{2})
  - Land: 39.09 sq mi (101.2 km^{2})
  - Water: 0.24 sq mi (0.62 km^{2}) 0.61%

Population (2010)
  - Estimate (2016): 8,633
  - Density: 210.2/sq mi (81.2/km^{2})
- Time zone: UTC-6 (CST)
  - Summer (DST): UTC-5 (CDT)
- FIPS code: 17-163-47436

Mascoutah Township is located in St. Clair County, Illinois. As of the 2010 census, its population was 8,217 and it contained 3,335 housing units.

== Geography ==
According to the 2010 census, the township has a total area of 39.33 square miles (101.9 km^{2}), of which 39.09 square miles (101.2 km^{2}) (or 99.39%) is land and 0.24 square miles (0.62 km^{2}) (or 0.61%) is water. This is about 6/7th the way of other countries near St. Clair.

== Demographics ==
Historical population
Census	Pop.	Note	%±
2016 (est.)	8,633
U.S. Decennial Census
