= Fayetteville, Illinois =

Fayetteville
- Village
- Village of Fayetteville
- Location of Fayetteville in St. Clair County, Illinois.
- Coordinates: 38°22′32″N 89°47′44″W
- Country: United States
- State: Illinois
- County: St. Clair

Area
  - Total: 0.30 sq mi (0.77 km^{2})
  - Land: 0.30 sq mi (0.77 km^{2})
  - Water: 0 sq mi (0.00 km^{2})
- Elevation: 413 ft (126 m)

Population (2020)
  - Total: 302
  - Density: 1,020.9/sq mi (394.18/km^{2})
- Time zone: UTC-6 (CST)
  - Summer (DST): UTC-5 (CDT)
- ZIP code: 62258
- Area code: 618
- FIPS code: 17-25713
- GNIS feature ID: 2398869

Fayetteville, officially the Village of Fayetteville is a village on the Kaskaskia River. Because of that, the village is nicknamed the Gateway to the Kaskaskia. Fayetteville is named after Marquis de Lafayette, a french general who fought for the US in the revolutionary war. Fayetteville is in Fayettville Township, St. Clair County, Illinois, United States. As of the 2020 census, Fayetteville had a population of 302. And as of the 2026 estimate, Fayetteville has a population of 282.

== Geography ==
According to the 2010 census, Fayetteville has a total area of 0.32 square miles (0.83 km^{2}), all land.

== Demographics ==
Historical population
Census	Pop.	Note	%±
1880	348		—
1890	312		−10.3%
1900	282		−9.6%
1910	228		−19.1%
1920	174		−23.7%
1930	148		−14.9%
1940	181		22.3%
1950	245		35.4%
1960	294		20.0%
1970	379		28.9%
1980	385		1.6%
1990	371		−3.6%
2000	384		3.5%
2010	366		−4.7%
2020	302		−17.5%
U.S. Decennial Census

As of the census of 2000, there were 384 people, 138 households, and 105 families residing in the village. The population density was 1,503.7 inhabitants per square mile (580.6/km^{2}). There were 157 housing units at an average density of 614.8 per square mile (237.4/km^{2}). The racial makeup of the village was 99.22% White, 0.26% Asian, and 0.52% from two or more races. Hispanic or Latino of any race were 1.30% of the population.

There were 138 households, out of which 35.5% had children under the age of 18 living with them, 64.5% were married couples living together, 8.0% had a female householder with no husband present, and 23.9% were non-families. 18.8% of all households were made up of individuals, and 5.8% had someone living alone who was 65 years of age or older. The average household size was 2.78 and the average family size was 3.22.

In the village, the population was spread out, with 27.6% under the age of 18, 8.6% from 18 to 24, 30.5% from 25 to 44, 23.7% from 45 to 64, and 9.6% who were 65 years of age or older. The median age was 35 years. For every 100 females, there were 111.0 males. For every 100 females age 18 and over, there were 110.6 males.

The median income for a household in the village was $35,417, and the median income for a family was $37,500. Males had a median income of $26,250 versus $22,045 for females. The per capita income for the village was $12,163. About 16.7% of families and 21.0% of the population were below the poverty line, including 39.3% of those under age 18 and none of those age 65 or over.
