= Freeburg Township, St. Clair County, Illinois =

Coordinates: 38°26′34″N 89°52′22″W

Freeburg Township, Illinois
- Township
- Location in St. Clair County

- St. Clair County's location in Illinois
- Country: United States
- State: Illinois
- County: St. Clair
- Established: November 6, 1883

Area
  - Total: 35.66 sq mi (92.4 km^{2})
  - Land: 34.32 sq mi (88.9 km^{2})
  - Water: 1.34 sq mi (3.5 km^{2}) 3.76%

Population (2010)
  - Estimate (2016): 4,911
  - Density: 148.9/sq mi (57.5/km^{2})
- Time zone: UTC-6 (CST)
  - Summer (DST): UTC-5 (CDT)
- FIPS code: 17-163-27819

Freeburg Township is located in St. Clair County, Illinois. As of the 2010 census, its population was 5,109 and it contained 2,118 housing units.

== Geography ==
According to the 2010 census, the township has a total area of 35.66 square miles (92.4 km^{2}), of which 34.32 square miles (88.9 km^{2}) (or 96.24%) is land and 1.34 square miles (3.5 km^{2}) (or 3.76%) is water.

== Demographics ==
Historical population
| Census | Pop. | Note | %± |
|---|---|---|---|
| 2016 (est.) | 4,911 |
U.S. Decennial Census
