= Pierre Martin House =

Historic house in Illinois, United States

- U.S. National Register of Historic Places
- Illinois State Historic Site
- Location within Illinois Location within the United States
- Location: First St. at Old Rt. 3, East Carondelet, Illinois
- Coordinates: 38°32′51″N 90°11′53″W
- Area: less than one acre
- Built: 1790
- Architectural style: French Colonial
- NRHP reference No.: 89002350
- Added to NRHP: February 9, 1990

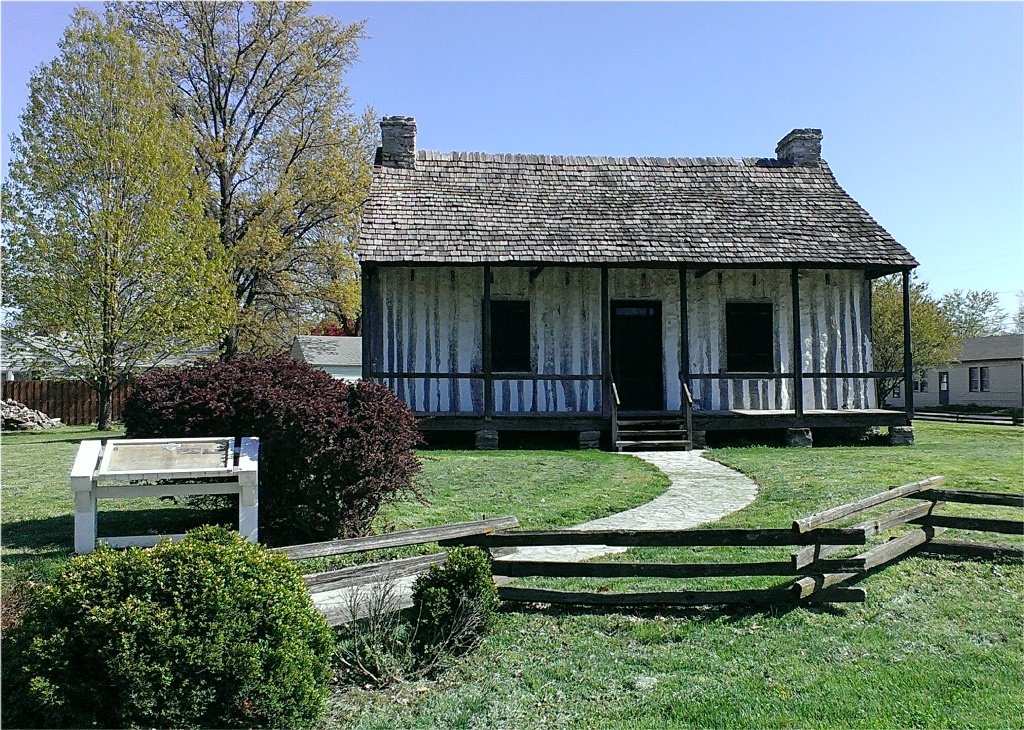
Martin–Boismenue House

The Pierre Martin House (or Martin–Boismenue House) is a single-family French Colonial House and historic site in East Carondelet, Illinois about 1.5 miles (2.4 km) East of the Mississippi River. The house, built circa 1790, is owned by the Illinois Historic Preservation Agency. and located at the intersection of First Street and Water Street in North Dupo.

== Description ==
The Martin–Boismenue House, built about 1790 by North American frontiersman Pierre Martin in what was at the time the French village of Prairie du Pont, is one of the oldest surviving structures in Illinois. Although the house was built after the American Bottom had been ceded to the young United States of America, the house reflects the French Colonial architectural traditions of the Mississippi River valley. The region immediately around Cahokia, Illinois continued to speak French for several decades after the cession.

It is one of six surviving poteaux-sur-sol ('post-on-sill') structures, and the only one owned by an upper-middle-class individual. The poteaux-sur-sol style used vertical logs to construct houses; the style, originally developed in Europe, had faded in popularity before French colonists revived it. Only 33 vertical log buildings remain in the United States; of these, the Pierre Martin House is one of only two with a dressed stone basement.

The traditional French building scheme shares many elements with traditional European half timbering. Squared-log outer walls support the roof; the logs, squared off by hand-hewing or with a pit saw, rest on a log sill mounted on a stone foundation. 'Galleries,' wide porches, enclose the house's north and south facades. The house consists of a two-room first floor, a large attic, a half basement, and the two galleries. There was no shortage of firewood in the Illinois Territory during the house's early history, and the three separate fireplaces were used to heat the home and acted as places for cooking.

The Martin–Boismenue House was listed on the National Register of Historic Places on February 9, 1990, as NRHP site #89002350. It is located at 2110 1st Street in East Carondelet.
