= Marissa Township, St. Clair County, Illinois =

Coordinates: 38°15′58″N 89°45′40″W

Marissa Township
- Township
- Location in St. Clair County

- St. Clair County's location in Illinois
- Country: United States
- State: Illinois
- County: St. Clair
- Established: November 6, 1883

Area
  - Total: 35.97 sq mi (93.2 km^{2})
  - Land: 34.44 sq mi (89.2 km^{2})
  - Water: 1.53 sq mi (4.0 km^{2}) 4.25%

Population (2010)
  - Estimate (2016): 2,300
  - Density: 71.7/sq mi (27.7/km^{2})
- Time zone: UTC-6 (CST)
  - Summer (DST): UTC-5 (CDT)
- FIPS code: 17-163-46968

Marissa Township is located in St. Clair County, Illinois. As of the 2010 census, its population was 2,468 and it contained 1,175 housing units.

== Geography ==
According to the 2010 census, the township has a total area of 35.97 square miles (93.2 km^{2}), of which 34.44 square miles (89.2 km^{2}) (or 95.75%) is land and 1.53 square miles (4.0 km^{2}) (or 4.25%) is water.

== Demographics ==
Historical population
Census	Pop.	Note	%±
2016 (est.)	2,300
U.S. Decennial Census
