= Shiloh Valley Township, St. Clair County, Illinois =

Coordinates: 38°31′34″N 89°52′25″W

Shiloh Valley Township
- Township
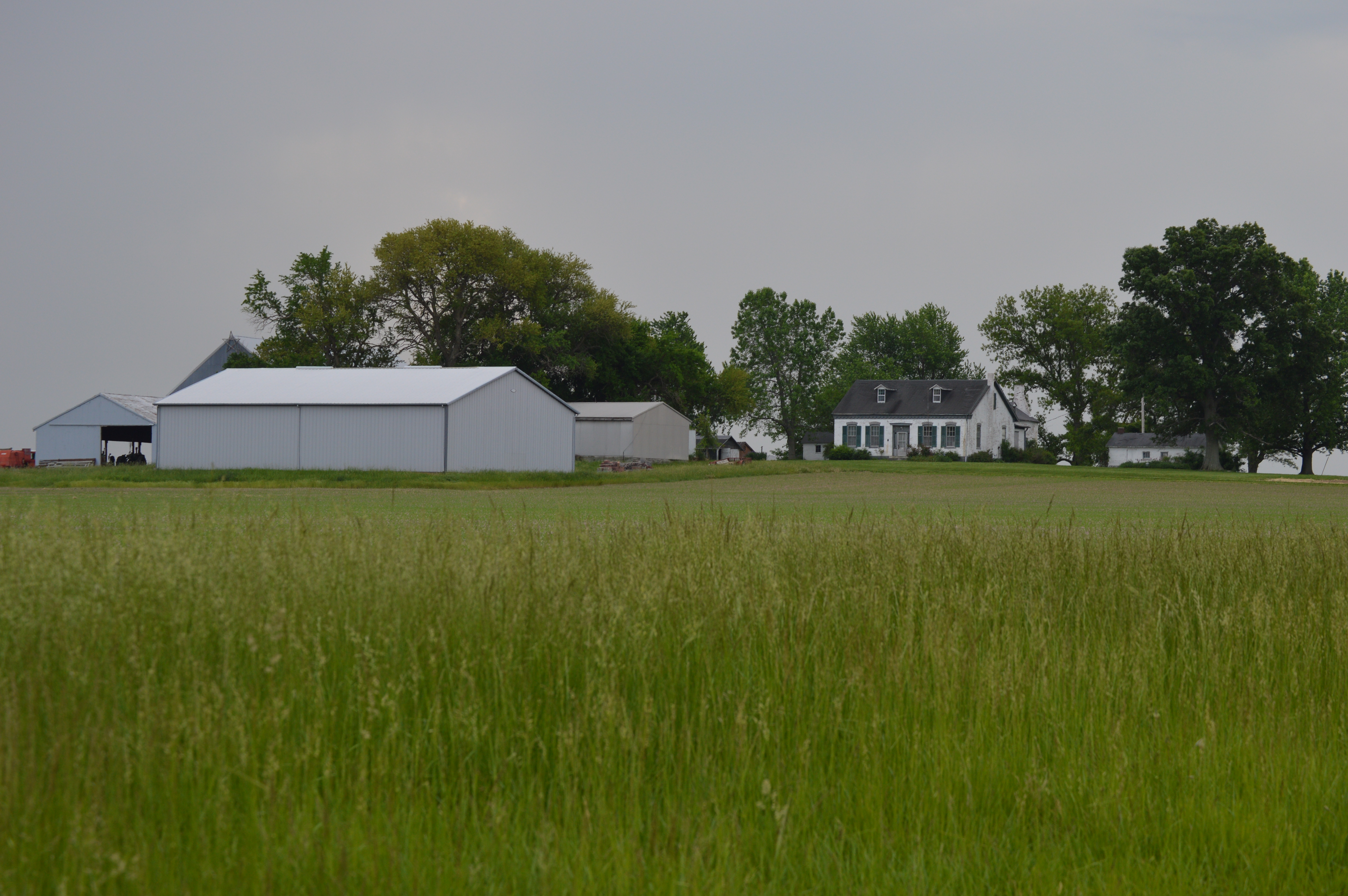
- The Knobeloch-Seibert Farm west of Mascoutah

- Location in St. Clair County

- St. Clair County's location in Illinois
- Country: United States
- State: Illinois
- County: St. Clair
- Established: Unknown

Area
  - Total: 31.89 sq mi (82.6 km^{2})
  - Land: 31.68 sq mi (82.1 km^{2})
  - Water: 0.21 sq mi (0.54 km^{2}) 0.66%

Population (2010)
  - Estimate (2016): 11,662
  - Density: 367.1/sq mi (141.7/km^{2})
- Time zone: UTC-6 (CST)
  - Summer (DST): UTC-5 (CDT)
- FIPS code: 17-163-69550

Shiloh Valley Township is located in St. Clair County, Illinois. As of the 2010 census, its population was 11,631 and it contained 4,284 housing units. Shiloh Valley Township was originally called Shiloh before its name was changed on an unknown date.

== Geography ==
According to the 2010 census, the township has a total area of 31.89 square miles (82.6 km^{2}), of which 31.68 square miles (82.1 km^{2}) (or 99.34%) is land and 0.21 square miles (0.54 km^{2}) (or 0.66%) is water.

== Demographics ==
Historical population
Census	Pop.	Note	%±
2016 (est.)	11,662
U.S. Decennial Census
