= New Athens Township, St. Clair County, Illinois =

Coordinates: 38°20′54″N 89°52′08″W

New Athens Township
- Township
- Location in St. Clair County

- St. Clair County's location in Illinois
- Country: United States
- State: Illinois
- County: St. Clair
- Established: November 6, 1883

Area
  - Total: 36 sq mi (93 km^{2})
  - Land: 34.03 sq mi (88.1 km^{2})
  - Water: 1.97 sq mi (5.1 km^{2}) 5.47%

Population (2010)
  - Estimate (2016): 2,501
  - Density: 78.1/sq mi (30.2/km^{2})
- Time zone: UTC-6 (CST)
  - Summer (DST): UTC-5 (CDT)
- FIPS code: 17-163-52129

New Athens Township is located in St. Clair County, Illinois. As of the 2010 census, its population was 2,657 and it contained 1,129 housing units.

== Geography ==
According to the 2010 census, the township has a total area of 36 square miles (93 km^{2}), of which 34.03 square miles (88.1 km^{2}) (or 94.53%) is land and 1.97 square miles (5.1 km^{2}) (or 5.47%) is water.

== Demographics ==
Historical population
Census	Pop.	Note	%±
2016 (est.)	2,501
U.S. Decennial Census
