= Lebanon Township, St. Clair County, Illinois =

Coordinates: 38°36′34″N 89°45′57″W

Lebanon Township
- Township
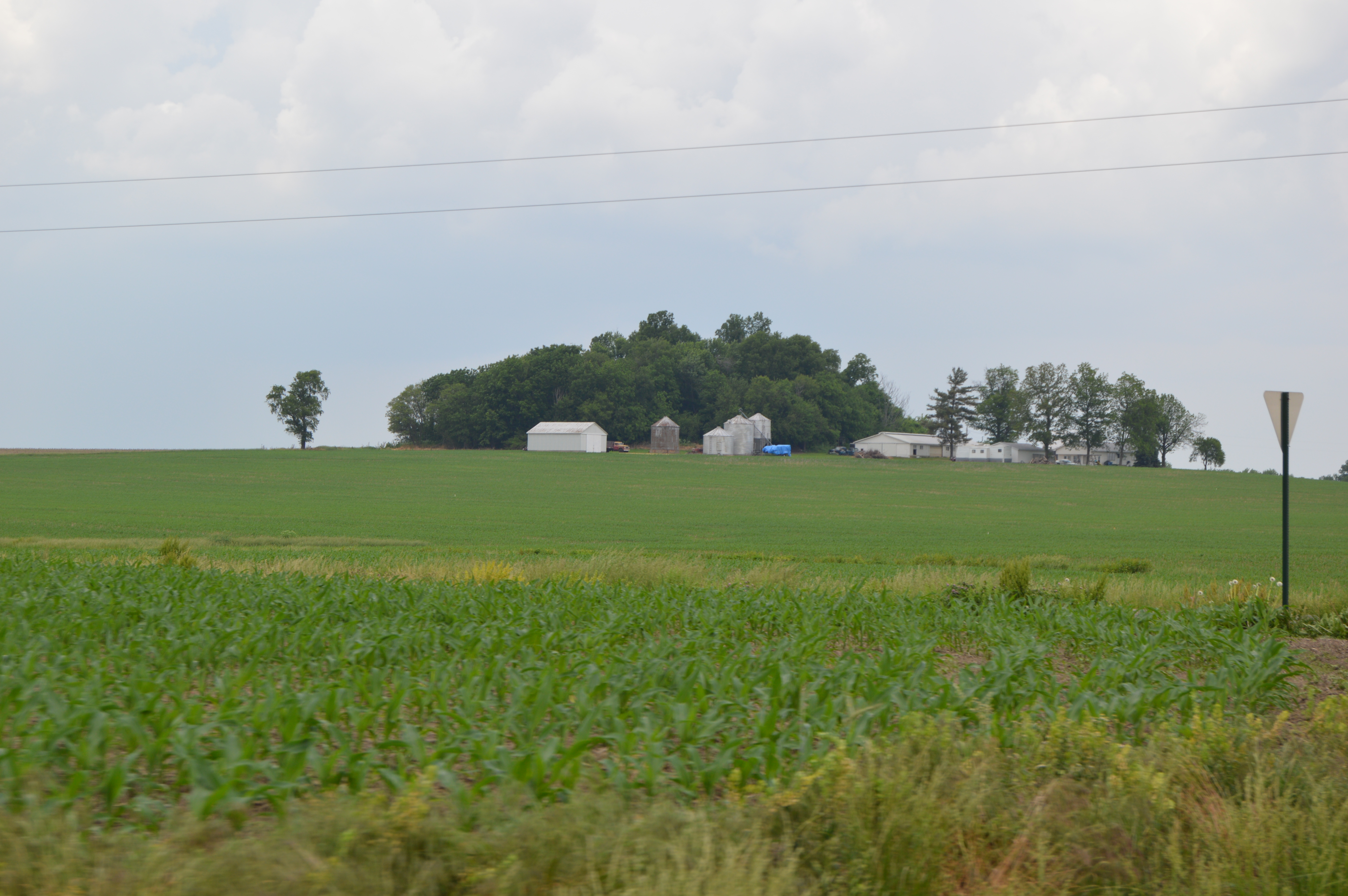
- The Emerald Mound, a historic site in the township

- Location in St. Clair County

- St. Clair County's location in Illinois
- Country: United States
- State: Illinois
- County: St. Clair
- Established: November 6, 1883

Area
  - Total: 36.55 sq mi (94.7 km^{2})
  - Land: 36.48 sq mi (94.5 km^{2})
  - Water: 0.07 sq mi (0.18 km^{2}) 0.19%

Population (2010)
  - Estimate (2016): 4,448
  - Density: 124.4/sq mi (48.0/km^{2})
- Time zone: UTC-6 (CST)
  - Summer (DST): UTC-5 (CDT)
- FIPS code: 17-163-42509

Lebanon Township is located in St. Clair County, Illinois. As of the 2010 census, its population was 4,538 and it contained 2,005 housing units.

== Geography ==
According to the 2010 census, the township has a total area of 36.55 square miles (94.7 km^{2}), of which 36.48 square miles (94.5 km^{2}) (or 99.81%) is land and 0.07 square miles (0.18 km^{2}) (or 0.19%) is water.

== Demographics ==
Historical population
Census	Pop.	Note	%±
2016 (est.)	4,448
U.S. Decennial Census
