= O'Fallon Township, St. Clair County, Illinois =

Coordinates: 38°36′49″N 89°51′53″W

O'Fallon Township
- Township
- Location in St. Clair County

- St. Clair County's location in Illinois
- Country: United States
- State: Illinois
- County: St. Clair
- Established: November 6, 1883

Area
  - Total: 35.78 sq mi (92.7 km^{2})
  - Land: 35.12 sq mi (91.0 km^{2})
  - Water: 0.66 sq mi (1.7 km^{2}) 1.84%

Population (2010)
  - Total: 26,467
  - Estimate (2018): 29,484
  - Density: 741.9/sq mi (286.4/km^{2})
- Time zone: UTC-6 (CST)
  - Summer (DST): UTC-5 (CDT)
- FIPS code: 17-163-55262
- Website: ofallontownship.org

O'Fallon Township is located in St. Clair County, Illinois. As of the 2010 census, its population was 26,053 and it contained 10,338 housing units.

== Geography ==
According to the 2010 census, the township has a total area of 35.78 square miles (92.7 km^{2}), of which 35.12 square miles (91.0 km^{2}) (or 98.16%) is land and 0.66 square miles (1.7 km^{2}) (or 1.84%) is water.

== Demographics ==
Historical population
Census	Pop.	Note	%±
2016 (est.)	26,281
U.S. Decennial Census
