= St. Clair County, Illinois =

County in Illinois, United States

- County
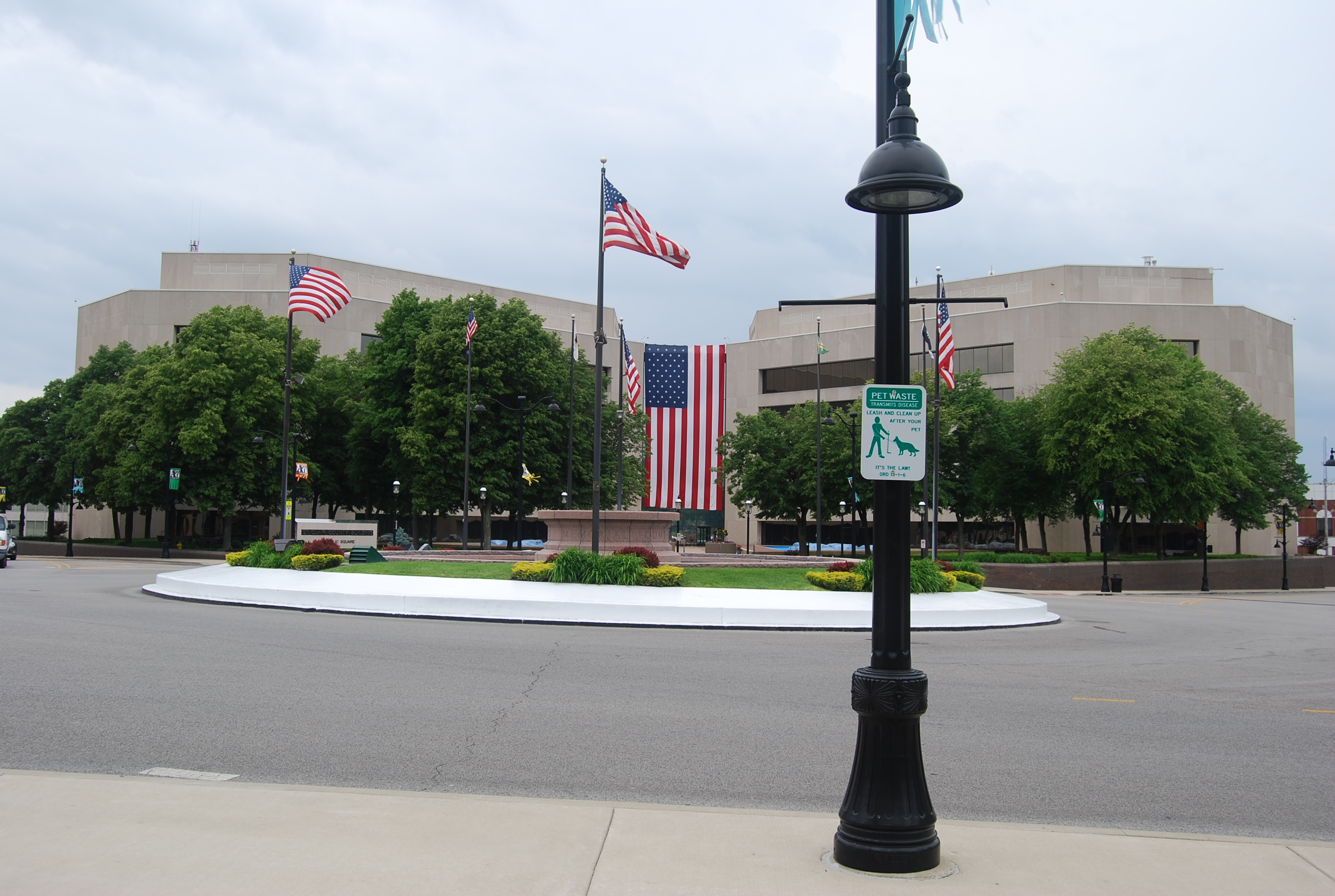
- St. Clair County Courthouse in Belleville

- Flag Seal

- Location within the U.S. state of Illinois
- Coordinates: 38°28′N 89°56′W
- Country: United States
- State: Illinois
- Founded: 1790
- Named for: Arthur St. Clair
- Seat: Belleville
- Largest city: Belleville

Area
  - Total: 674 sq mi (1,750 km^{2})
  - Land: 658 sq mi (1,700 km^{2})
  - Water: 16 sq mi (41 km^{2}) 2.4%

Population (2020)
  - Total: 257,400
  - Estimate (2025): 250,708 ▼
  - Density: 391/sq mi (151/km^{2})
- Time zone: UTC−6 (Central)
  - Summer (DST): UTC−5 (CDT)
- Congressional districts: 12th, 13th
- Website: www.co.st-clair.il.us

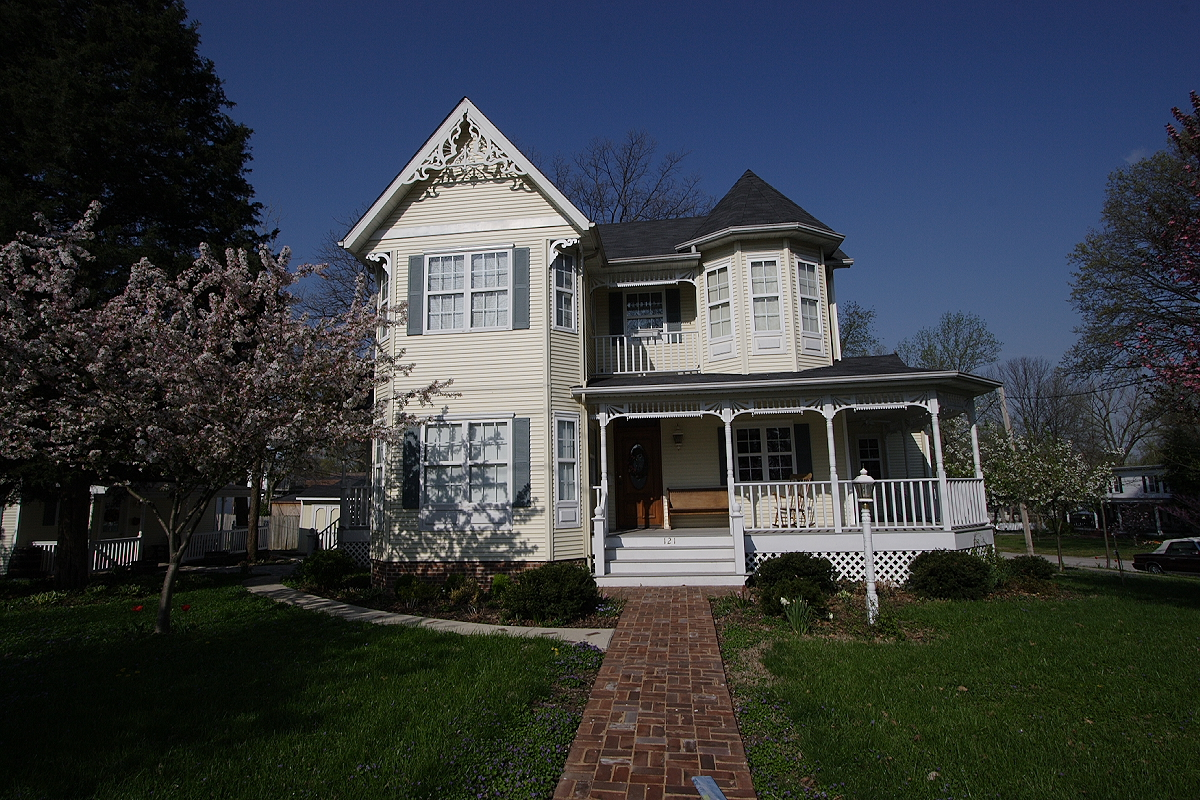
House in Lebanon, Il historic district

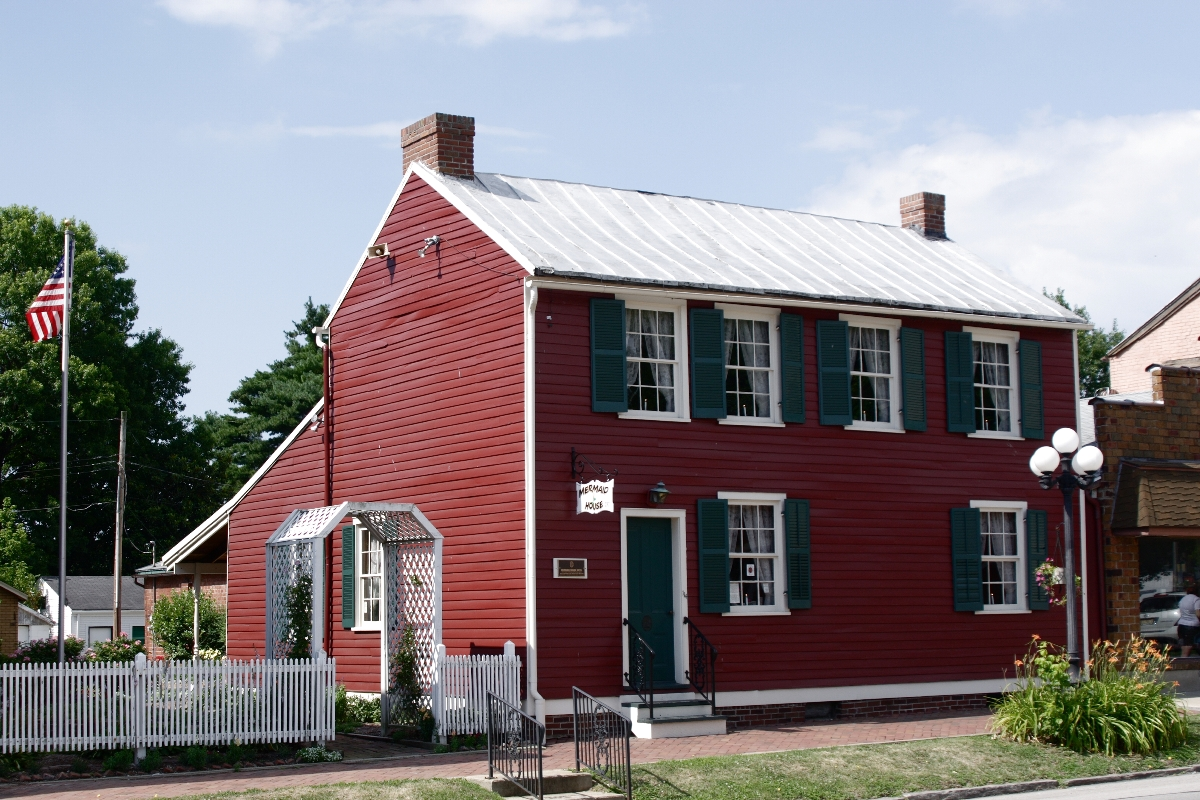
Mermaid House Hotel, Lebanon, Illinois

St. Clair County is the ninth most populous county in Illinois. Located directly east of St. Louis, the county is part of the Metro East region of the Greater St. Louis metropolitan area in Southern Illinois, known as "Little Egypt". As of the 2020 United States census, St. Clair County had a population of 257,400, making it the second most populous county in Illinois outside the Northern Third. Belleville is the county seat and largest city.

Along the Mississippi River, Cahokia Village was founded in 1697 by French settlers and served as a Jesuit mission to convert tribes of the Illinois Confederation to Christianity. The area became the center of the French Illinois Country. Prior to the establishment of Illinois as a state, the government of the Northwest Territory created St. Clair County in 1790. In 1809, the county became the administrative center of the Illinois Territory and one of the two original counties of Illinois, alongside Randolph County. In 1970, the United States Census Bureau placed the mean center of U.S. population, which generally has moved west every decennial census, in St. Clair County.

== History ==
This area was occupied for thousands of years by cultures of indigenous peoples. The first modern explorers and colonists of the area were French and French Canadians, founding a mission settlement in 1697 now known as Cahokia Village. After Great Britain defeated France in the Seven Years' War in 1763 and absorbed its territory in North America east of the Mississippi River, British-American colonists began to move into the area. Many French Catholics moved to settlements west of the river rather than live under British Protestant rule.

After the United States achieved independence in the late 18th century, St. Clair County was the first county established in present-day Illinois; it antedates Illinois' existence as a separate jurisdiction. The county was established in 1790 by a proclamation of Arthur St. Clair, first governor of the Northwest Territory, who named it after himself.

The original boundary of St. Clair county covered a large area between the Mackinaw and Ohio rivers. In 1801, Governor William Henry Harrison re-established St. Clair County as part of the Indiana Territory, extending its northern border to Lake Superior and the international border with Rupert's Land.

When the Illinois Territory was created in 1809, Territorial Secretary Nathaniel Pope, in his capacity as acting governor, issued a proclamation establishing St. Clair and Randolph County as the two original counties of Illinois.

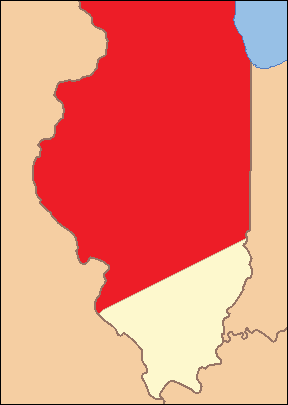
St. Clair County as it was re-established in 1809. This diagonal border line had been drawn by the Indiana Territorial government in 1803.

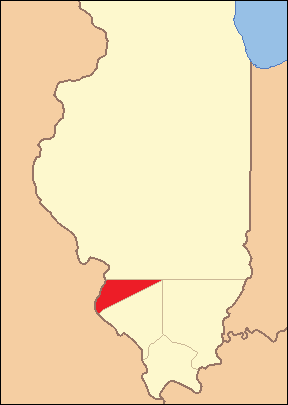
St. Clair County between 1812 and 1813

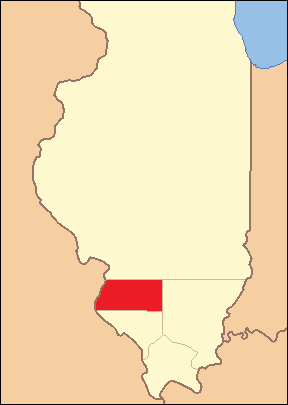
St. Clair County between 1813 and 1816

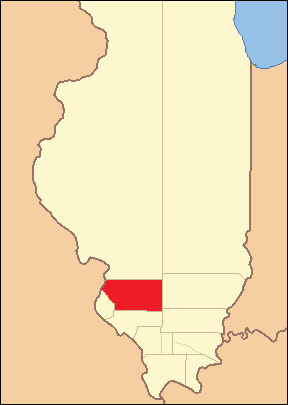
St. Clair County between 1816 and 1818

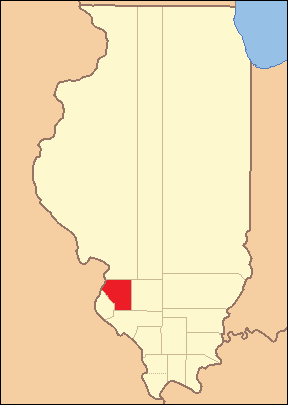
St. Clair County between 1818 and 1825

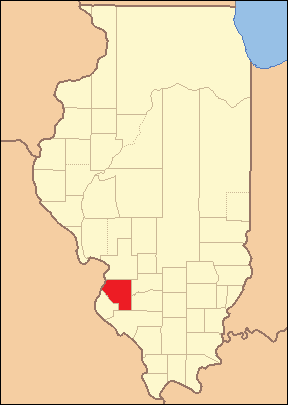
St. Clair County between 1825 and 1827

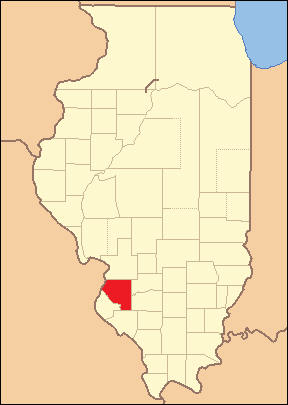
St. Clair County from 1827 to present

Originally developed for agriculture, this area became industrialized and urbanized in the area of East St. Louis, Illinois, a city that developed on the east side of the Mississippi River from St. Louis, Missouri. It was always strongly influenced by actions of businessmen from St. Louis, who were initially French Creole fur traders with western trading networks.

In the 19th century, industrialists from St. Louis put coal plants and other heavy industry on the east side of the river, developing East St. Louis. Coal from southern mines was transported on the river to East St. Louis, then fed by barge to St. Louis furnaces as needed. After bridges spanned the river, industry expanded.

In the late 19th and early 20th centuries, the cities attracted immigrants from southern and eastern Europe and from the South. In 1910 there were 6,000 African Americans in the city. With the Great Migration underway from the rural South, to leave behind Jim Crow and disenfranchisement, by 1917, the African-American population in East St. Louis had doubled. Whites were generally hired first and given higher–paying jobs, but there were still opportunities for American blacks. If hired as strikebreakers, they were resented by white workers, and both groups competed for jobs and limited housing in East St. Louis. The city had not been able to keep up with the rapid growth of population. The United States was developing war industries to support its eventual entry into the Great War, now known as World War I.

In February 1917 tensions in the city arose as white workers struck at the Aluminum Ore Company. Employers fiercely resisted union organizing, sometimes with violence. In this case they hired hundreds of blacks as strikebreakers. White workers complained to the city council about this practice in late May. Rumors circulated about an armed African American man robbing a white man, and whites began to attack blacks on the street. The governor ordered in the National Guard and peace seemed restored by early June.

"On July 1, a white man in a Ford shot into black homes. Armed African-Americans gathered in the area and shot into another oncoming Ford, killing two men who turned out to be police officers investigating the shooting." Word spread and whites gathered at the Labor Temple; the next day they fanned out across the city, armed with guns, clubs, anything they could use against the blacks they encountered. From July 1 through July 3, 1917, the East St. Louis riots engulfed the city, with whites attacking blacks throughout the city, pulling them from streetcars, shooting and hanging them, burning their houses. During this period, some African Americans tried to swim or use boats to get to safety; thousands crossed the Eads Bridge to St. Louis, seeking refuge, until the police closed it off. The official death toll was 39 blacks and nine whites, but some historians believe more blacks were killed. Because the riots were racial terrorism, the Equal Justice Initiative has included these deaths among the lynchings of African Americans in the state of Illinois in its 2017 3rd edition of its report, Lynching in America.

The riots had disrupted East St. Louis, which had seemed to be on the rise as a flourishing industrial city. In addition to the human toll, they cost approximately $400,000 in property damage (over $8 million, in 2017 US Dollars). They have been described as among the worst labor and race-related riots in United States history, and they devastated the African-American community.

Rebuilding was difficult as workers were being drafted to fight in World War I. When the veterans returned, they struggled to find jobs and re-enter the economy, which had to shift down to peacetime.

In the late 20th century, national restructuring of heavy industry cost many jobs, hollowing out the city, which had a marked decline in population. Residents who did not leave have suffered high rates of poverty and crime. In the early 21st century, East St. Louis is a site of urban decay. Swathes of deteriorated housing were demolished and parts of the city have become urban prairie. In 2017 the city marked the centennial of the riots that had so affected its residents.

Other cities in St. Clair County border agricultural or vacant lands. Unlike the suburbs on the Missouri side of the metro area, those in Metro-East are typically separated by agriculture, or otherwise undeveloped land left after the decline of industry. The central portion of St. Clair county is located on a bluff along the Mississippi River. This area is being developed with suburban housing, particularly in Belleville, and its satellite cities. The eastern and southern portion of the county is sparsely populated. The older small communities and small tracts of newer suburban villages are located between large areas of land devoted to corn and soybean fields, the major commodity crops of the area.

According to the St. Clair County Historical Society, the county flag was designed in 1979 by Kent Zimmerman, a senior at O'Fallon Township High School. Zimmerman's flag won first place in a contest against submissions by more than 40 grade school and high school students from throughout the county. The winning entry features the outline of St. Clair County with an orange moon, a stalk of corn, and a pickaxe against a background of three stripes alternating green, yellow, and green.

== Geography ==
According to the US Census Bureau, the county has a total area of 674 square miles (1,750 km^{2}), of which 658 square miles (1,700 km^{2}) is land and 16 square miles (41 km^{2}) (2.4%) is water.

=== Climate and weather ===
Belleville, Illinois

Climate chart (precipitation, max. and min. temperature)
J	F	M	A	M	J	J	A	S	O	N	D
2 40 22	2.2 46 27	3.5 57 35	3.9 68 45	4.2 77 54	4 86 63	3.5 90 67	3.3 88 64	3 82 56	2.9 71 45	3.9 56 36	3 44 27
- █ Average max. and min. temperatures in °F
- █ Precipitation totals in inches
- Source: The Weather Channel
Metric conversion
J	F	M	A	M	J	J	A	S	O	N	D
51 4 −6	56 8 −3	90 14 2	99 20 7	106 25 12	101 30 17	89 32 19	85 31 18	76 28 13	73 22 7	99 13 2	75 7 −3
- █ Average max. and min. temperatures in °C
- █ Precipitation totals in mm

In recent years, average temperatures in the county seat of Belleville have ranged from a low of 22 °F (−6 °C) in January to a high of 90 °F (32 °C) in July, although a record low of −27 °F (−33 °C) was recorded in January 1977 and a record high of 117 °F (47 °C) at East St. Louis, Illinois was recorded in July 1954. Average monthly precipitation ranged from 2.02 inches (51 mm) in January to 4.18 inches (106 mm) in May.

== Transportation ==
=== Major highways ===
- Interstate 55
- Interstate 64
- Interstate 70
- Interstate 255
- U.S. Highway 40
- U.S. Highway 50
- Illinois Route 3
- Illinois Route 4
- Illinois Route 13
- Illinois Route 15
- Illinois Route 111
- Illinois Route 156
- Illinois Route 157
- Illinois Route 158
- Illinois Route 159
- Illinois Route 161
- Illinois Route 163
- Illinois Route 177
- Illinois Route 203

=== Public transit ===
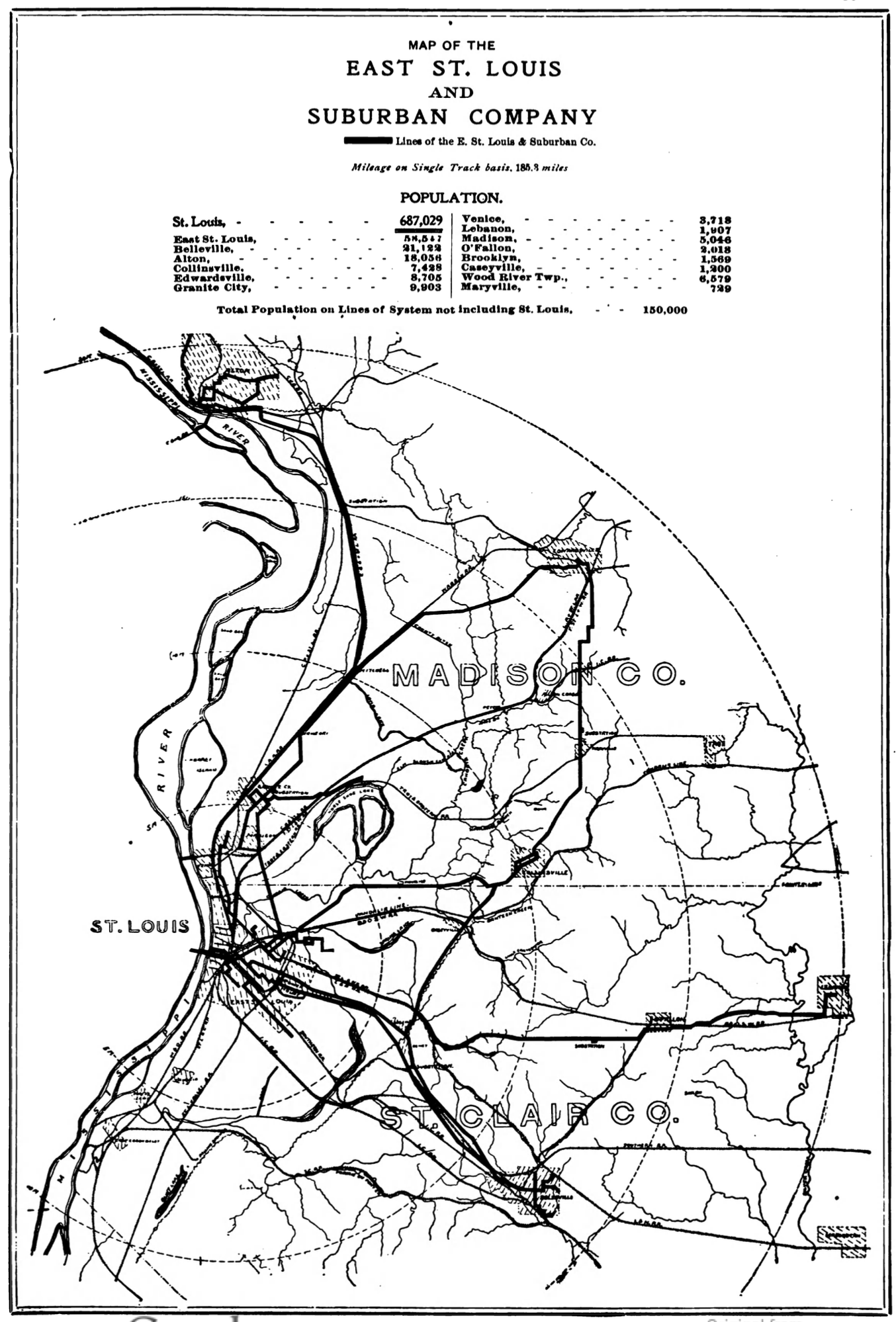
Map of the East St. Louis and Suburban Railway c. 1912

St. Clair County is home to 11 St. Louis MetroLink stations on the Red and Blue Lines.

- East Riverfront
- 5th & Missouri
- Emerson Park
- Jackie Joyner-Kersee Center
- Washington Park
- Fairview Heights
- Memorial Hospital
- Swansea
- Belleville
- College
- Shiloh-Scott

St. Clair County is also served by Metrobus and Madison County Transit.

=== Adjacent counties and city ===
- Madison County (north)
- Clinton County (northeast)
- Washington County (east)
- Randolph County (south)
- Monroe County (southwest)
- St. Louis, Missouri (west)
- St. Louis County, Missouri (west)

== Demographics ==
Historical population
Census	Pop.	Note	%±
1820	5,253		—
1830	7,078		34.7%
1840	13,631		92.6%
1850	20,180		48.0%
1860	37,694		86.8%
1870	51,068		35.5%
1880	61,806		21.0%
1890	66,571		7.7%
1900	86,685		30.2%
1910	119,870		38.3%
1920	136,520		13.9%
1930	157,775		15.6%
1940	166,899		5.8%
1950	205,995		23.4%
1960	262,509		27.4%
1970	285,176		8.6%
1980	267,531		−6.2%
1990	262,852		−1.7%
2000	256,082		−2.6%
2010	270,056		5.5%
2020	257,400		−4.7%
2025 (est.)	250,708	▼	−2.6%
US Decennial Census; 1790-1960 1900-1990; 1990-2000 2010-2019

=== 2020 census ===
St. Clair County, Illinois – Racial and ethnic composition Note: the US Census treats Hispanic/Latino as an ethnic category. This table excludes Latinos from the racial categories and assigns them to a separate category. Hispanics/Latinos may be of any race.
Race / Ethnicity (NH = Non-Hispanic)	Pop 1980	Pop 1990	Pop 2000	Pop 2010	Pop 2020	% 1980	% 1990	% 2000	% 2010	% 2020
White alone (NH)	188,772	185,410	171,151	169,858	150,496	70.56%	70.54%	66.83%	62.90%	58.47%
Black or African American alone (NH)	73,095	70,971	73,282	81,860	76,013	27.32%	27.00%	28.62%	30.31%	29.53%
Native American or Alaska Native alone (NH)	374	542	577	539	490	0.14%	0.21%	0.23%	0.20%	0.19%
Asian alone (NH)	1,302	1,929	2,257	3,213	3,623	0.49%	0.73%	0.88%	1.19%	1.41%
Native Hawaiian or Pacific Islander alone (NH)	x	x	105	213	181	x	x	0.04%	0.08%	0.07%
Other race alone (NH)	597	139	265	361	1,152	0.22%	0.05%	0.10%	0.13%	0.45%
Mixed race or Multiracial (NH)	x	x	2,841	5,227	12,863	x	x	1.11%	1.94%	5.00%
Hispanic or Latino (any race)	3,391	3,861	5,604	8,785	12,582	1.27%	1.47%	2.19%	3.25%	4.89%
Total	267,531	262,852	256,082	270,056	257,400	100.00%	100.00%	100.00%	100.00%	100.00%

As of the 2020 census, the county had a population of 257,400. The median age was 39.3 years, 23.4% of residents were under the age of 18, and 16.6% of residents were 65 years of age or older. For every 100 females there were 93.8 males, and for every 100 females age 18 and over there were 90.4 males age 18 and over.

As of the 2020 census, the racial makeup of the county was 59.6% White, 29.7% Black or African American, 0.3% American Indian and Alaska Native, 1.4% Asian, 0.1% Native Hawaiian and Pacific Islander, 2.1% from some other race, and 6.8% from two or more races, while Hispanic or Latino residents of any race comprised 4.9% of the population.

As of the 2020 census, 85.8% of residents lived in urban areas while 14.2% lived in rural areas.

As of the 2020 census, there were 103,134 households, of which 30.6% had children under the age of 18 living in them. Of all households, 42.7% were married-couple households, 18.9% were households with a male householder and no spouse or partner present, and 31.9% were households with a female householder and no spouse or partner present. About 29.7% of all households were made up of individuals and 12.2% had someone living alone who was 65 years of age or older.

As of the 2020 census, there were 114,595 housing units, of which 10.0% were vacant. Among occupied housing units, 65.1% were owner-occupied, 34.9% were renter-occupied, the homeowner vacancy rate was 2.4%, and the rental vacancy rate was 9.6%.

=== 2010 census ===
As of the 2010 United States census, there were 270,056 people, 105,045 households, and 70,689 families residing in the county. The population density was 410.6 inhabitants per square mile (158.5/km^{2}). There were 116,249 housing units at an average density of 176.7 per square mile (68.2/km^{2}). The racial makeup of the county was 64.6% white, 30.5% black or African American, 1.2% Asian, 0.2% American Indian, 0.1% Pacific islander, 1.2% from other races, and 2.2% from two or more races. Those of Hispanic or Latino origin made up 3.3% of the population. In terms of ancestry, 27.5% were German, 11.1% were Irish, 7.4% were English, and 4.6% were American.

Of the 105,045 households, 34.7% had children under the age of 18 living with them, 44.6% were married couples living together, 17.7% had a female householder with no husband present, 32.7% were non-families, and 27.5% of all households were made up of individuals. The average household size was 2.53 and the average family size was 3.09. The median age was 36.9 years.

The median income for a household in the county was $48,562 and the median income for a family was $61,042. Males had a median income of $47,958 versus $34,774 for females. The per capita income for the county was $24,770. About 12.3% of families and 15.5% of the population were below the poverty line, including 24.7% of those under age 18 and 9.7% of those age 65 or over.

== Government and infrastructure ==
The Southwestern Illinois Correctional Center, operated by the Illinois Department of Corrections, is near East St. Louis.

Also located in St. Clair County is Scott Air Force Base, which is home to U.S. Transportation Command, the Air Force's Air Mobility Command, and the U.S. Army Transportation Command.

=== Politics ===
St. Clair County is a reliably Democratic county, having voted for the Democratic presidential candidate in every presidential election since 1928, with the exception of the 1972 United States presidential election.

United States presidential election results for St. Clair County, Illinois
Year	Republican		Democratic		Third party(ies)	
Year	No.	%	No.	%	No.	%
1892	6,276	44.72%	7,207	51.35%	551	3.93%
1896	8,960	50.96%	8,345	47.46%	278	1.58%
1900	9,764	48.67%	9,827	48.98%	472	2.35%
1904	11,926	55.31%	8,200	38.03%	1,435	6.66%
1908	12,619	48.66%	11,342	43.73%	1,973	7.61%
1912	8,156	31.53%	10,826	41.85%	6,884	26.61%
1916	22,134	47.70%	22,622	48.75%	1,650	3.56%
1920	21,681	51.34%	14,032	33.23%	6,518	15.43%
1924	23,380	45.85%	14,921	29.26%	12,693	24.89%
1928	31,026	45.60%	36,374	53.46%	637	0.94%
1932	22,744	31.34%	47,305	65.18%	2,522	3.48%
1936	26,684	31.86%	54,238	64.75%	2,840	3.39%
1940	35,998	40.05%	53,482	59.50%	411	0.46%
1944	33,557	40.82%	48,325	58.78%	327	0.40%
1948	30,883	36.07%	54,260	63.38%	474	0.55%
1952	39,713	39.51%	60,311	60.01%	479	0.48%
1956	41,528	42.77%	55,295	56.94%	283	0.29%
1960	42,046	38.31%	67,367	61.38%	338	0.31%
1964	28,226	27.61%	74,005	72.39%	0	0.00%
1968	34,442	34.14%	50,726	50.29%	15,706	15.57%
1972	50,519	51.50%	46,636	47.54%	942	0.96%
1976	40,333	39.91%	59,177	58.55%	1,555	1.54%
1980	46,063	45.76%	50,046	49.71%	4,564	4.53%
1984	51,046	49.01%	52,294	50.21%	808	0.78%
1988	41,439	42.58%	55,465	57.00%	409	0.42%
1992	31,951	29.71%	57,625	53.58%	17,965	16.71%
1996	33,066	35.02%	53,405	56.56%	7,958	8.43%
2000	42,299	42.13%	55,961	55.74%	2,133	2.12%
2004	50,203	44.35%	62,410	55.14%	576	0.51%
2008	47,958	38.05%	76,160	60.42%	1,936	1.54%
2012	50,125	41.83%	67,285	56.15%	2,417	2.02%
2016	53,857	44.35%	60,756	50.03%	6,823	5.62%
2020	57,150	44.47%	68,325	53.17%	3,030	2.36%
2024	54,021	44.80%	63,433	52.61%	3,118	2.59%

== Communities ==
=== Cities ===
- Belleville
- Cahokia Heights
- Collinsville (partial) (mostly in Madison County)
- Columbia (partial) (mostly in Monroe County)
- East St. Louis
- Fairview Heights
- Lebanon
- Madison
- Mascoutah
- O'Fallon

=== Villages ===
- Brooklyn
- Caseyville
- Dupo
- East Carondelet
- Fairmont City
- Fayetteville
- Freeburg
- Hecker
- Lenzburg
- Marissa
- Millstadt
- New Athens
- New Baden
- Sauget
- Shiloh
- Smithton
- St. Libory
- Summerfield
- Swansea
- Washington Park

=== Census-designated places ===
- Darmstadt
- Floraville
- Paderborn
- Rentchler
- Scott AFB

=== Unincorporated communities ===
- Douglas
- Imbs
- North Dupo
- Signal Hill
- State Park Place
- Westview

=== Townships ===
- Canteen
- Caseyville
- Centreville
- East St. Louis
- Engelmann
- Fayetteville
- Freeburg
- Lebanon
- Lenzburg
- Marissa
- Mascoutah
- Millstadt
- New Athens
- O'Fallon
- Prairie du Long
- St. Clair
- Shiloh Valley
- Smithton
- Stites
- Stookey
- Sugarloaf

=== Former Township ===
- Belleville

=== Former Communities ===
- Alorton
- Cahokia
- Centreville
- National City

=== Islands ===
- Bloody Island

== Education ==
Below is a list of school districts with any territory in the county, no matter how slight, even if the schools and/or administrative offices are located in other counties:

K-12 school districts

- Brooklyn Unit School District 188
- Cahokia Community Unit School District 187
- Collinsville Community Unit School District 10
- Columbia Community Unit School District 4
- Dupo Community Unit School District 196
- East St. Louis School District 189
- Lebanon Community Unit School District 9
- Marissa Community Unit School District 40
- Mascoutah Community Unit School District 19
- New Athens Community Unit School District 60
- Red Bud Community Unit School District 132
- Waterloo Community Unit School District 5
- Wesclin Community Unit School District 3

Secondary school districts

- Belleville Township High School District 201
- Freeburg Community High School District 77
- O'Fallon Township High School District 203

Elementary school districts

- Belle Valley School District 11
- Belleville School District 118
- Central School District 104
- Harmony Emge School District 175
- Freeburg Community Consolidated School District 70
- Grant Community Consolidated School District 110
- High Mount School District 116
- Millstadt Consolidated Community School District 160
- O'Fallon Community Consolidated School District 90
- Pontiac-William Holliday School District 105
- Shiloh Village School District 85
- Signal Hill School District 181
- Smithton Community Consolidated School District 130
- St. Libory Consolidated School District 30
- Whiteside School District 115
- Wolf Branch School District 113

== See also ==
- National Register of Historic Places listings in St. Clair County, Illinois
