= Shiloh Village School District 85 =

School district in St. Clair County, Illinois, United States

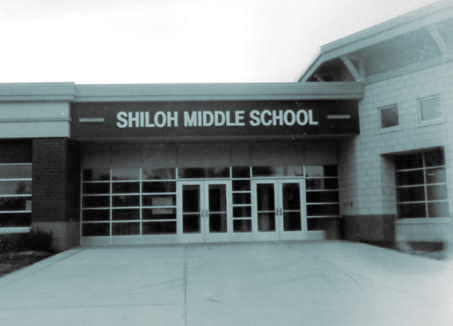
- Shiloh Middle School entrance at 1 Wildcat Crossing

Address
- 125 Diamond Court & 1 Wildcat Crossing Shiloh, St. Clair County, Illinois, 62269; United States

District information
- Type: Common school district
- Schools: 2
- NCES District ID: 1736210

Students and staff
- Students: 330
- Faculty: 37.6 (FTE)
- Student–teacher ratio: 17.95

Other information
- Website: www.shi85.org

Shiloh Village School District #85 is a public grade school district in Shiloh, Illinois. It operates Shiloh Elementary School for pre-kindergarten to grade 3, and Shiloh Middle School for grades 4 to 8.

Shiloh Middle School opened in January 2005, and Shiloh Village School was renamed to Shiloh Elementary School.
