= Prairie du Long Township, St. Clair County, Illinois =

Prairie du Long Township
- Township
- Location in St. Clair County

- St. Clair County's location in Illinois
- Coordinates: 38°21′07″N 89°58′53″W
- Country: United States
- State: Illinois
- County: St. Clair
- Established: November 6, 1883

Area
  - Total: 35.97 sq mi (93.2 km^{2})
  - Land: 35.53 sq mi (92.0 km^{2})
  - Water: 0.44 sq mi (1.1 km^{2}) 1.22%
- Elevation: 427 ft (130 m)

Population (2010)
  - Estimate (2016): 2,200
  - Density: 63.2/sq mi (24.4/km^{2})
- Time zone: UTC-6 (CST)
  - Summer (DST): UTC-5 (CDT)
- FIPS code: 17-163-61600
- Website: prairiedulongil.gov

Prairie du Long Township is located in St. Clair County, Illinois. As of the 2010 census, its population was 2,244 and it contained 864 housing units.

== Geography ==
According to the 2010 census, the township has a total area of 35.97 square miles (93.2 km^{2}), of which 35.53 square miles (92.0 km^{2}) (or 98.78%) is land and 0.44 square miles (1.1 km^{2}) (or 1.22%) is water.

== Demographics ==
Historical population
Census	Pop.	Note	%±
2016 (est.)	2,200
U.S. Decennial Census
