= Engelmann Township, St. Clair County, Illinois =

Coordinates: 38°26′15″N 89°46′02″W

Engelmann Township
- Township
- Location in St. Clair County

- St. Clair County's location in Illinois
- Country: United States
- State: Illinois
- County: St. Clair
- Established: November 6, 1883

Area
  - Total: 29.78 sq mi (77.1 km^{2})
  - Land: 29.57 sq mi (76.6 km^{2})
  - Water: 0.22 sq mi (0.57 km^{2}) 0.74%

Population (2010)
  - Estimate (2016): 687
  - Density: 24.6/sq mi (9.5/km^{2})
- Time zone: UTC-6 (CST)
  - Summer (DST): UTC-5 (CDT)
- FIPS code: 17-163-24205

Engelmann Township is located in St. Clair County, Illinois. As of the 2010 census, its population was 726 and it contained 288 housing units.

== Geography ==
According to the 2010 census, the township has a total area of 29.78 square miles (77.1 km^{2}), of which 29.57 square miles (76.6 km^{2}) (or 99.29%) is land and 0.22 square miles (0.57 km^{2}) (or 0.74%) is water.

== Demographics ==
Historical population
Census	Pop.	Note	%±
2016 (est.)	687
U.S. Decennial Census
