= Shiloh, Illinois =

Village of Shiloh
- Village
- Motto: "The Place To Be"
- Location of Shiloh in St. Clair County, Illinois.
- Coordinates: 38°32′50″N 89°53′40″W
- Country: United States
- State: Illinois
- County: St. Clair

Area
  - Total: 11.14 sq mi (28.84 km^{2})
  - Land: 11.05 sq mi (28.61 km^{2})
  - Water: 0.089 sq mi (0.23 km^{2})
- Elevation: 564 ft (172 m)

Population (2020)
  - Total: 14,098
  - Density: 1,276.2/sq mi (492.73/km^{2})
- Time zone: UTC-6 (CST)
  - Summer (DST): UTC-5 (CDT)
- FIPS code: 17-69524
- GNIS feature ID: 2399809
- Website: shilohil.org

Shiloh is a village in St. Clair County, Illinois, United States. As of the 2020 census, Shiloh had a population of 14,098. It is located within the St. Louis metropolitan area.

== History ==
A site known as "Three Springs" for its geological characteristics hosted an 11-day revival camp meeting in April 1807, which was the first in St. Clair County and possibly the second in Illinois Country, which was then part of Indiana Territory. It was organized by the Rev. William McKendree, Presiding Elder of the Western Conference and 4th Bishop of the Methodist Episcopal Church.

This assembly inspired construction of the log Shiloh Meeting House on the site shortly afterward, being the first Methodist church in the county and second in the Illinois Country. This meeting house came to be the longest-organized United Methodist church in the state of Illinois, bequeathing its name to the village and township which grew up around it. Three members of this church played significant roles in state government in the effort to prevent slaveholding from gaining a foothold in Illinois.

== Geography ==
According to the 2010 census, Shiloh has a total area of 10.95 square miles (28.36 km^{2}), of which 10.86 square miles (28.13 km^{2}) (or 99.18%) is land and 0.09 square miles (0.23 km^{2}) (or 0.82%) is water.

Shiloh is the site of Scott Air Force Base and is also the present eastern terminus of the Saint Louis area electric interurban Metrolink Red Line.

== Demographics ==
=== Racial and ethnic composition ===
Shiloh, Illinois – Racial and ethnic composition Note: the US Census treats Hispanic/Latino as an ethnic category. This table excludes Latinos from the racial categories and assigns them to a separate category. Hispanics/Latinos may be of any race.
Race / Ethnicity (NH = Non-Hispanic)	Pop 2000	Pop 2010	Pop 2020	% 2000	% 2010	% 2020
White alone (NH)	6,153	8,702	8,486	80.51%	68.79%	60.19%
Black or African American alone (NH)	1,007	2,732	3,571	13.18%	21.60%	25.33%
Native American or Alaska Native alone (NH)	19	15	31	0.25%	0.12%	0.22%
Asian alone (NH)	130	377	401	1.70%	2.98%	2.84%
Native Hawaiian or Pacific Islander alone (NH)	6	23	13	0.08%	0.18%	0.09%
Other race alone (NH)	14	25	74	0.18%	0.20%	0.52%
Mixed race or Multiracial (NH)	114	374	823	1.49%	2.96%	5.84%
Hispanic or Latino (any race)	200	403	699	2.62%	3.19%	4.96%
Total	7,643	12,651	14,098	100.00%	100.00%	100.00%

Historical population
Census	Pop.	Note	%±
1870	298		—
1910	395		—
1920	381		−3.5%
1930	384		0.8%
1940	409		6.5%
1950	453		10.8%
1960	701		54.7%
1970	945		34.8%
1980	1,045		10.6%
1990	2,655		154.1%
2000	7,643		187.9%
2010	12,651		65.5%
2020	14,098		11.4%
2024 (est.)	14,754		4.7%
U.S. Decennial Census

=== 2020 census ===
As of the 2020 census, Shiloh had a population of 14,098. The median age was 38.0 years. 23.0% of residents were under the age of 18 and 14.4% of residents were 65 years of age or older. For every 100 females there were 94.1 males, and for every 100 females age 18 and over there were 89.9 males age 18 and over.

98.3% of residents lived in urban areas, while 1.7% lived in rural areas.

There were 5,572 households in Shiloh, of which 33.2% had children under the age of 18 living in them. Of all households, 50.6% were married-couple households, 15.2% were households with a male householder and no spouse or partner present, and 28.5% were households with a female householder and no spouse or partner present. About 26.6% of all households were made up of individuals and 10.2% had someone living alone who was 65 years of age or older.

There were 5,942 housing units, of which 6.2% were vacant. The homeowner vacancy rate was 2.6% and the rental vacancy rate was 7.5%.

=== 2000 census ===
As of the census of 2000, there were 7,643 people, 2,778 households, and 2,080 families residing in the village. The population density was 760.2 inhabitants per square mile (293.5/km^{2}). There were 2,928 housing units at an average density of 291.2 per square mile (112.4/km^{2}). The racial makeup of the village was 82.14% White, 13.32% African American, 0.27% Native American, 1.79% Asian, 0.08% Pacific Islander, 0.75% from other races, and 1.65% from two or more races. Hispanic or Latino of any race were 2.62% of the population.

There were 2,778 households, out of which 40.9% had children under the age of 18 living with them, 60.8% were married couples living together, 10.7% had a female householder with no husband present, and 25.1% were non-families. 20.2% of all households were made up of individuals, and 5.1% had someone living alone who was 65 years of age or older. The average household size was 2.63 and the average family size was 3.05.

In the village, the population age distribution was 27.7% under 18, 10.7% from 18 to 24, 34.6% from 25 to 44, 20.4% from 45 to 64, and 6.7% that were 65 years of age or older. The median age was 33 years. For every 100 females, there were 102.0 males. For every 100 females age 18 and over, there were 98.0 males.

The median income for a household in the village was $57,692, and the median income for a family was $67,054. Males had a median income of $42,083 versus $30,843 for females. The per capita income for the village was $25,550. About 6.1% of families and 7.7% of the population were below the poverty line, including 11.1% of those under age 18 and 1.6% of those age 65 or over.

== Education ==
The Shiloh Village School District 85 consists of two schools. Most children attend Shiloh Elementary and Shiloh Middle School, both public schools. Shiloh students attend O'Fallon Township High School, District 203. Students west of Greenmount Road attend Whiteside Elementary School and attend Belleville High School-East.

== Health care ==
Shiloh is home to Memorial Hospital East, part of BJC HealthCare. A satellite facility of the Alvin J. Siteman Cancer Center moved into a new building on the campus in early 2020.

== Notable people ==
- Ken Bone, participant in the 2016 presidential debate
- Shannon O'Keefe, professional ten-pin bowler and bowling coach for McKendree University
- Mary Wickes, actress who is interred at the Shiloh Valley Cemetery
