= Sugarloaf Township, St. Clair County, Illinois =

Sugarloaf Township
- Township
- Location in St. Clair County
- Coordinates: 38°30′21″N 90°11′42″W
- Country: United States
- State: Illinois
- County: St. Clair
- Established: November 6, 1883

Area
  - Total: 31.77 sq mi (82.3 km^{2})
  - Land: 30.67 sq mi (79.4 km^{2})
  - Water: 1.09 sq mi (2.8 km^{2}) 3.43%
- Elevation: 646 ft (197 m)

Population (2010)
  - Estimate (2016): 6,891
  - Density: 238.7/sq mi (92.2/km^{2})
- Time zone: UTC-6 (CST)
  - Summer (DST): UTC-5 (CDT)
- FIPS code: 17-163-73456

Sugarloaf Township is located in St. Clair County, Illinois. As of the 2010 census, its population was 7,322 and it contained 3,219 housing units.

== Geography ==
According to the 2010 census, the township has a total area of 31.77 square miles (82.3 km^{2}), of which 30.67 square miles (79.4 km^{2}) (or 96.54%) is land and 1.09 square miles (2.8 km^{2}) (or 3.43%) is water.

== Demographics ==
Historical population
Census	Pop.	Note	%±
2016 (est.)	6,891
U.S. Decennial Census
