= Lenzburg, Illinois =

Lenzburg
- Village
- Location of Lenzburg in St. Clair County, Illinois.
- Coordinates: 38°17′09″N 89°49′05″W
- Country: United States
- State: Illinois
- County: St. Clair

Area
  - Total: 1.26 sq mi (3.27 km^{2})
  - Land: 1.15 sq mi (2.99 km^{2})
  - Water: 0.11 sq mi (0.28 km^{2})
- Elevation: 443 ft (135 m)

Population (2020)
  - Total: 468
  - Density: 405.3/sq mi (156.48/km^{2})
- Time zone: UTC-6 (CST)
  - Summer (DST): UTC-5 (CDT)
- ZIP code: 62255
- Area code: 618
- FIPS code: 17-42860
- GNIS feature ID: 2398420

Lenzburg is a village in St. Clair County, Illinois, USA. As of the 2020 census, Lenzburg had a population of 468.

== Geography ==
According to the 2010 census, Lenzburg has a total area of 1.296 square miles (3.36 km^{2}), of which 1.19 square miles (3.08 km^{2}) (or 91.82%) is land and 0.106 square miles (0.27 km^{2}) (or 8.18%) is water.

== Demographics ==
Historical population
Census	Pop.	Note	%±
1890	266		—
1900	343		28.9%
1910	463		35.0%
1920	502		8.4%
1930	443		−11.8%
1940	428		−3.4%
1950	431		0.7%
1960	420		−2.6%
1970	437		4.0%
1980	435		−0.5%
1990	510		17.2%
2000	577		13.1%
2010	521		−9.7%
2020	468		−10.2%
U.S. Decennial Census

As of the census of 2000, there were 577 people, 217 households, and 169 families residing in the village. The population density was 467.2 inhabitants per square mile (180.4/km^{2}). There were 235 housing units at an average density of 190.3 per square mile (73.5/km^{2}). The racial makeup of the village was 99.13% White, 0.17% Native American, 0.17% Asian, and 0.52% from two or more races. Hispanic or Latino of any race were 0.69% of the population.

There were 217 households, out of which 36.4% had children under the age of 18 living with them, 53.5% were married couples living together, 18.4% had a female householder with no husband present, and 21.7% were non-families. 17.5% of all households were made up of individuals, and 8.3% had someone living alone who was 65 years of age or older. The average household size was 2.66 and the average family size was 2.91.

In the village, the population was spread out, with 29.8% under the age of 18, 8.3% from 18 to 24, 30.2% from 25 to 44, 18.9% from 45 to 64, and 12.8% who were 65 years of age or older. The median age was 35 years. For every 100 females, there were 98.3 males. For every 100 females age 18 and over, there were 95.7 males.

The median income for a household in the village was $30,417, and the median income for a family was $35,769. Males had a median income of $29,844 versus $21,023 for females. The per capita income for the village was $13,505. About 14.5% of families and 12.7% of the population were below the poverty line, including 12.3% of those under age 18 and 8.3% of those age 65 or over.

== Notable people ==
- Warren Hacker, pitcher mostly for the Chicago Cubs and was a resident of Lenzburg at the time of his death.
- Mickey Haefner, pitcher for the Washington Senators, Chicago White Sox and Boston Braves
