= Fayetteville Township, St. Clair County, Illinois =

Coordinates: 38°21′28″N 89°45′19″W

Fayetteville Township
- Township
- Location in St. Clair County

- St. Clair County's location in Illinois
- Country: United States
- State: Illinois
- County: St. Clair
- Established: November 6, 1883

Area
  - Total: 43.85 sq mi (113.6 km^{2})
  - Land: 42.96 sq mi (111.3 km^{2})
  - Water: 0.89 sq mi (2.3 km^{2}) 2.03%

Population (2010)
  - Estimate (2016): 1,596
  - Density: 38.8/sq mi (15.0/km^{2})
- Time zone: UTC-6 (CST)
  - Summer (DST): UTC-5 (CDT)
- FIPS code: 17-163-25726

Fayetteville Township is located in St. Clair County, Illinois. As of the 2010 census, its population was 1,668 and it contained 722 housing units.

== Geography ==
According to the 2010 census, the township has a total area of 43.85 square miles (113.6 km^{2}), of which 42.96 square miles (111.3 km^{2}) (or 97.97%) is land and 0.89 square miles (2.3 km^{2}) (or 2.03%) is water.

== Demographics ==
Historical population
Census	Pop.	Note	%±
2016 (est.)	1,596
U.S. Decennial Census
