= Millstadt Township, St. Clair County, Illinois =

Coordinates: 38°25′04″N 90°05′05″W

Millstadt Township
- Township
- Location in St. Clair County

- St. Clair County's location in Illinois
- Country: United States
- State: Illinois
- County: St. Clair
- Established: November 6, 1883

Area
  - Total: 47.73 sq mi (123.6 km^{2})
  - Land: 46.69 sq mi (120.9 km^{2})
  - Water: 1.05 sq mi (2.7 km^{2}) 2.20%

Population (2010)
  - Estimate (2016): 6,474
  - Density: 143.9/sq mi (55.6/km^{2})
- Time zone: UTC-6 (CST)
  - Summer (DST): UTC-5 (CDT)
- FIPS code: 17-163-49399
- Website: millstadttownship.org

Millstadt Township is located in St. Clair County, Illinois. As of the 2010 census, its population was 6,718 and it contained 2,782 housing units.

== Geography ==
According to the 2010 census, the township has a total area of 47.73 square miles (123.6 km^{2}), of which 46.69 square miles (120.9 km^{2}) (or 97.82%) is land and 1.05 square miles (2.7 km^{2}) (or 2.20%) is water.

== Demographics ==
Historical population
Census	Pop.	Note	%±
2016 (est.)	6,474
U.S. Decennial Census
