= Lenzburg Township, St. Clair County, Illinois =

Coordinates: 38°15′51″N 89°51′41″W

Lenzburg Township
- Township
- Location in St. Clair County

- St. Clair County's location in Illinois
- Country: United States
- State: Illinois
- County: St. Clair
- Established: November 6, 1883

Area
  - Total: 31.26 sq mi (81.0 km^{2})
  - Land: 28.89 sq mi (74.8 km^{2})
  - Water: 2.37 sq mi (6.1 km^{2}) 7.58%

Population (2010)
  - Estimate (2016): 989
  - Density: 36.2/sq mi (14.0/km^{2})
- Time zone: UTC-6 (CST)
  - Summer (DST): UTC-5 (CDT)
- FIPS code: 17-163-42873

Lenzburg Township is located in St. Clair County, Illinois. As of the 2010 census, its population was 1,047 and it contained 450 housing units.

== Geography ==
According to the 2010 census, the township has a total area of 31.26 square miles (81.0 km^{2}), of which 28.89 square miles (74.8 km^{2}) (or 92.42%) is land and 2.37 square miles (6.1 km^{2}) (or 7.58%) is water.

== Demographics ==
Historical population
Census	Pop.	Note	%±
2016 (est.)	989
U.S. Decennial Census
