= Smithton Township, St. Clair County, Illinois =

Coordinates: 38°26′33″N 89°59′15″W

Smithton Township
- Township
- Location in St. Clair County

- St. Clair County's location in Illinois
- Country: United States
- State: Illinois
- County: St. Clair
- Established: November 6, 1883

Area
  - Total: 32.91 sq mi (85.2 km^{2})
  - Land: 32.28 sq mi (83.6 km^{2})
  - Water: 0.63 sq mi (1.6 km^{2}) 1.91%

Population (2010)
  - Estimate (2016): 4,225
  - Density: 132.4/sq mi (51.1/km^{2})
- Time zone: UTC-6 (CST)
  - Summer (DST): UTC-5 (CDT)
- FIPS code: 17-163-70265

Smithton Township (Township 1 South, Range 8 West) is located in St. Clair County, Illinois. As of the 2010 census, its population was 4,275 and it contained 1,684 housing units.

== Geography ==
According to the 2010 census, the township has a total area of 32.91 square miles (85.2 km^{2}), of which 32.28 square miles (83.6 km^{2}) (or 98.09%) is land and 0.63 square miles (1.6 km^{2}) (or 1.91%) is water.

== Demographics ==
Historical population
Census	Pop.	Note	%±
2016 (est.)	4,225
U.S. Decennial Census

== Elected Officials ==
The current Members of the Smithton Township Board are Supervisor William F. Weber; Trustees Donald Barkau, Mark Rodriguez, Neil Espenschied, Quentin Grommet; Highway Commissioner Paul Reinneck; Clerk Troy L. Herring.

All seven Smithton Township Officials are serving a four-year term that ends in May, 2025.
