= Greater St. Louis =

- Combined statistical area
- St. Louis, MO–IL metropolitan statistical area
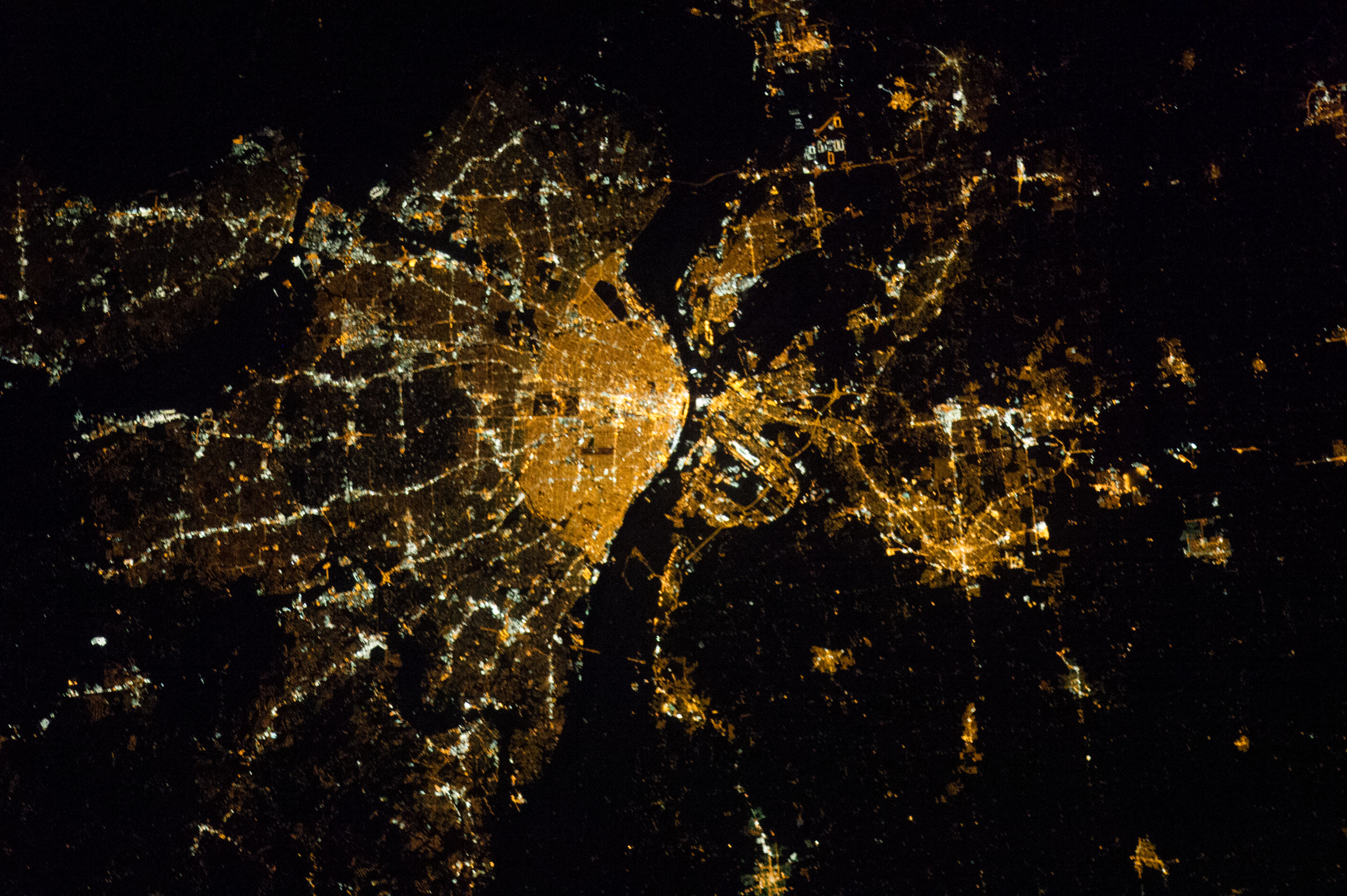
- A NASA image of the Greater St. Louis area at night in December 2013
Interactive map of St. Louis–St. Charles–
Farmington, MO–IL CSA
St. Louis, MO–IL MSA
City of St. Louis
Greater St. Louis (Missouri)
Metro East (Illinois)
Other statistical areas in the St. Louis CSA
Farmington, MO µSA
Centralia, IL µSA
- Country: United States
- State: Missouri; Illinois
- Largest city: St. Louis
- Other cities: O'Fallon, MO; St. Charles, MO; St. Peters, MO; Florissant, MO; Chesterfield, MO; Belleville, IL; O'Fallon, IL; Granite City, IL; Edwardsville, IL; Alton, IL; East St. Louis, IL; Fenton, MO

Area
  - Total: 8,458 sq mi (21,910 km^{2})
  - Land: 8,261 sq mi (21,400 km^{2})
  - Water: 197 sq mi (510 km^{2}) 2.3%
- Elevation: 466–1,280 ft (142–390 m)

Population (2020)
  - Metro density: 339.8/sq mi (131.2/km^{2})
  - MSA: 2,805,473 (20th)
  - CSA: 2,909,003 (20th)
- MSA/CSA = 2020

GDP
  - MSA: $209.9 billion (2022)
- Time zone: UTC−6 (CST)
  - Summer (DST): UTC−5 (CDT)
- Area codes: 217, 235, 314, 447, 557, 573, 618, 636, 730

Greater St. Louis is the 23rd-largest metropolitan statistical area (MSA) in the United States with an MSA population of more than 2.8 million, and a CSA population of almost 3 million. It has the largest metro population in Missouri, and the second-largest in Illinois. Its core city—St. Louis, Missouri—sits in the geographic center of the metro area, on the west bank of the Mississippi River. The river bisects the metro area geographically between Illinois and Missouri, although the latter portion is much more populous. The MSA includes St. Louis County, which is independent of the City of St. Louis; their two populations are generally tabulated separately.

The St. Louis, MO-IL metropolitan statistical area (MSA) includes the City of St. Louis; the Illinois counties of Bond, Calhoun, Clinton, Jersey, Macoupin, Madison, Monroe, and St. Clair (known collectively as the Metro East); and the Missouri counties of Crawford (only the City of Sullivan), Franklin, Jefferson, Lincoln, St. Charles, St. Louis (separate from and not inclusive of the city of St. Louis), and Warren.

The larger St. Louis–St. Charles–Farmington, MO–IL combined statistical area (CSA) includes all of the aforementioned MSA, plus the Farmington, MO micropolitan statistical area, which includes St. Francois County, Missouri, and the Centralia, IL micropolitan statistical area, which includes Marion County, Illinois.

In 2020, the St. Louis MSA was the 21st-largest in the nation with a population of 2,820,253. The larger CSA is ranked 20th largest in the United States, with a population of 2,909,003. It fell out of the country's top 20 largest MSAs in 2017 for the first time since 1840.

As of 2021, Greater St. Louis is home to the headquarters of 10 of Missouri's 11 Fortune 500 companies, six Fortune 1,000 companies, and four of the top 50 largest private companies in America, as ranked by Forbes. The metropolitan area received the All-America City Award in 2008.

== History ==
The Illini Confederacy once dominated what is today the St. Louis area. During the 17th century, the population of indigenous peoples in the area was well over tens of thousands, including 20,000 in the Grand Village of Illinois. Indigenous peoples in the area built earthwork mounds on both sides of the Mississippi River, with the Cahokia Mounds as the regional center. St. Louis would later receive the nickname of "Mound City".

Pierre Laclede Liguest and his 13-year-old grandson, Auguste Chouteau, selected St. Louis as the site for a French fur trading post in 1764 because it was a rarely flooded area at the confluence of the Mississippi and Missouri Rivers. In 1770, ownership of St. Louis was transferred to Spain, and then returned to France during a secret treaty (Treaty of San Ildefonso).

The area became part of the United States in the 1803 Louisiana Purchase, and steadily grew thereafter. It was the starting point for Lewis and Clark. St. Louis was incorporated as a city in 1823. Between 1840 and 1860, the population exploded, particularly because of the arrival of German and Irish immigrants. St. Louis's current boundaries were established in 1876. After the American Civil War, St. Louis continued to grow into a major manufacturing center due to its access to rail and water transportation. By the 1890s, St. Louis was the 4th-largest city in the United States.

In 1904, St. Louis hosted the world's fair in Forest Park and the Olympics at Washington University's Francis Field. More than 20 million people visited the city during the fair's seven-month long run. St. Louis was seen as a city of industrialization with ties to the automobile industry. The Great Migration between World War I and World War II brought thousands of African Americans to the city, boosting St. Louis's population to 800,000 by 1940. The population peaked in 1950 at 856,000. There was no more room for expansion within city boundaries and earlier immigrant generations started moving to suburbs that could not be annexed.

During the mid-1960s, construction began on the Gateway Arch and Busch Stadium, in part to help revitalize the central business district. A 30-year downtown building boom followed. Today, there is a continued population decline although revitalization efforts are under way.

== Political divisions in Greater St. Louis ==
County or equivalent	State	Seat	2025 estimate	2020 census	Change	Area	Density
St. Louis	Missouri	Clayton	990,911	1,004,125	−1.32%	523 sq mi (1,350 km^{2})	1,895/sq mi (732/km^{2})
St. Charles	Missouri	St. Charles	426,499	405,262	+5.24%	593 sq mi (1,540 km^{2})	719/sq mi (278/km^{2})
St. Louis City	Missouri	—	278,144	301,578	−7.77%	66 sq mi (170 km^{2})	4,214/sq mi (1,627/km^{2})
Madison	Illinois	Edwardsville	263,110	265,859	−1.03%	741 sq mi (1,920 km^{2})	355/sq mi (137/km^{2})
St. Clair	Illinois	Belleville	250,708	257,400	−2.60%	674 sq mi (1,750 km^{2})	372/sq mi (144/km^{2})
Jefferson	Missouri	Hillsboro	233,132	226,739	+2.82%	664 sq mi (1,720 km^{2})	351/sq mi (136/km^{2})
Franklin	Missouri	Union	108,090	104,682	+3.26%	931 sq mi (2,410 km^{2})	116/sq mi (45/km^{2})
Lincoln	Missouri	Troy	66,676	59,574	+11.92%	640 sq mi (1,700 km^{2})	104/sq mi (40/km^{2})
Macoupin	Illinois	Carlinville	43,748	44,967	−2.71%	868 sq mi (2,250 km^{2})	50/sq mi (19/km^{2})
Warren	Missouri	Warrenton	39,016	35,532	+9.81%	438 sq mi (1,130 km^{2})	89/sq mi (34/km^{2})
Clinton	Illinois	Carlyle	37,128	36,899	+0.62%	503 sq mi (1,300 km^{2})	74/sq mi (28/km^{2})
Monroe	Illinois	Waterloo	34,840	34,962	−0.35%	398 sq mi (1,030 km^{2})	88/sq mi (34/km^{2})
Jersey	Illinois	Jerseyville	21,160	21,512	−1.64%	377 sq mi (980 km^{2})	56/sq mi (22/km^{2})
Bond	Illinois	Greenville	16,959	16,725	+1.40%	383 sq mi (990 km^{2})	44/sq mi (17/km^{2})
Calhoun	Illinois	Hardin	4,300	4,437	−3.09%	284 sq mi (740 km^{2})	15/sq mi (6/km^{2})
Total (Note: Per the most recent OMB bulletin, the portion of Sullivan, Missouri within Crawford County, Missouri is included in St. Louis' statistical areas. Population data for this portion of Sullivan is not readily available and is not included in this table.)			2,814,421	2,820,253	−0.21%	8,083 sq mi (20,930 km^{2})	348/sq mi (134/km^{2})

Historical population
Census	Pop.	Note	%±
1830	14,125		—
1840	35,979		154.7%
1850	104,978		191.8%
1860	190,524		81.5%
1870	351,189		84.3%
1880	382,406		8.9%
1890	554,648		45.0%
1900	801,131		44.4%
1910	1,003,858		25.3%
1920	1,139,877		13.5%
1930	1,359,512		19.3%
1940	1,432,088		5.3%
1950	1,681,281		17.4%
1960	2,262,624		34.6%
1970	2,535,725		12.1%
1980	2,503,549		−1.3%
1990	2,580,897		3.1%
2000	2,698,687		4.6%
2010	2,787,701		3.3%
2020	2,820,253		1.2%
U.S. Decennial Census; 1790–1960 1900–1990; 1990–2000 2010–2014

=== Missouri ===
- Crawford County: Sullivan (partial)
- Franklin County: Berger, Charmwood, Gerald, Leslie, Miramiguoa Park, New Haven, Oak Grove Village, Pacific (partially), Parkway, St. Clair, Sullivan (partially), Union, Washington
- Jefferson County: Arnold, Barnhart, Byrnes Mill, Cedar Hill Lakes, Crystal City, De Soto, Festus, Herculaneum, Hillsboro, Imperial, Kimmswick, Lake Tekakwitha, Olympian Village, Parkdale, Peaceful Village, Pevely, Scotsdale
- Lincoln County: Cave, Chain of Rocks, Elsberry, Foley, Fountain N' Lakes, Hawk Point, Moscow Mills, Old Monroe, Silex, Troy, Truxton, Whiteside, Winfield
- St. Charles County: Augusta, Cottleville, Dardenne Prairie, Defiance, Foristell, Flint Hill, Josephville, Lake St. Louis, New Melle, O'Fallon, Portage des Sioux, St. Charles, St. Paul, St. Peters, Weldon Spring, Weldon Spring Heights, Wentzville, West Alton
- St. Louis (Independent City): City of St. Louis
- St. Louis County: Ballwin, Bel-Nor, Bel-Ridge, Bella Villa, Bellefontaine Neighbors, Bellerive, Berkeley, Beverly Hills, Black Jack, Breckenridge Hills, Brentwood, Bridgeton, Calverton Park, Champ, Charlack, Chesterfield, Clarkson Valley, Clayton, Cool Valley, Country Club Hills, Country Life Acres, Crestwood, Creve Coeur, Crystal Lake Park, Dellwood, Des Peres, Edmundson, Ellisville, Eureka, Fenton, Ferguson, Flordell Hills, Florissant, Frontenac, Glen Echo Park, Glendale, Grantwood Village, Green Park, Greendale, Hanley Hills, Hazelwood, Hillsdale, Huntleigh, Kinloch, Kirkwood, Jennings, Ladue, Lakeshire, Manchester, Maplewood, Marlborough, Maryland Heights, Moline Acres, Normandy, Northwoods, Norwood Court, Oakland, Olivette, Overland, Pacific (partially), Pagedale, Pasadena Hills, Pasadena Park, Pine Lawn, Richmond Heights, Riverview, Rock Hill, St. Ann, St. John, Shrewsbury, Sunset Hills, Sycamore Hills, Town and Country, Twin Oaks, University City, Uplands Park, Valley Park, Velda City, Velda Village Hills, Vinita Park, Warson Woods, Webster Groves, Wellston, Westwood, Wilbur Park, Wildwood, Winchester, Woodson Terrace
- Warren County: Foristell, Innsbrook, Marthasville, Pendleton, Three Creeks, Truesdale, Warrenton, Wright City

=== Illinois ===
- Bond County: Donnellson, Greenville, Keyesport (partially), Mulberry Grove, Old Ripley, Panama, Pierron, Pocahontas, Smithboro, Sorento
- Calhoun County: Batchtown, Brussels, Hamburg, Hardin, Kampsville
- Clinton County: Albers, Aviston, Bartelso, Beckemeyer, Breese, Carlyle, Centralia (partially), Damiansville, Germantown, Hoffman, Huey, Keyesport (partially), New Baden, St. Rose, Shattuc, Trenton, Wamac (partially)
- Jersey County: Brighton (partially), Elsah, Fidelity, Fieldon, Grafton, Jerseyville, Otterville
- Macoupin County: Benld, Brighton (mostly), Bunker Hill, Carlinville, Chesterfield, Dorchester, East Gillespie, Eagarville, Gillespie, Girard, Hettick, Lake Ka-ho, Mt. Olive, Medora, Modesto, Mount Clare, Nilwood, Palmyra, Royal Lakes, Sawyerville, Scottville, Shipman, Standard City, Staunton, Virden (partially), White City, Wilsonville
- Madison County: Alhambra, Alton, Bethalto, Collinsville (mostly), East Alton, Edwardsville, Fairmont City (partially), Godfrey, Glen Carbon, Granite City, Grantfork, Hamel, Hartford, Highland, Livingston, Madison, Marine, Maryville, New Douglas, Pontoon Beach, Pierron, Roxana, South Roxana, St. Jacob, Troy, Venice, Williamson, Wood River, Worden
- Monroe County: Columbia, Fults, Hecker, Maeystown, Valmeyer, Waterloo
- St. Clair County: Belleville, Brooklyn, Cahokia Heights, Caseyville, Collinsville (partially), Columbia, Dupo, East Carondelet, East St. Louis, Fairmont City (partially), Fairview Heights, Fayetteville, Freeburg, Hecker, Lebanon, Lenzburg, Madison, Marissa, Mascoutah, Millstadt, New Athens, New Baden, O'Fallon, Sauget, Shiloh, Smithton, St. Libory, Summerfield, Swansea, Washington Park

As noted above, the Greater St. Louis area includes two municipalities named O'Fallon (in St. Charles County, Missouri and St. Clair County, Illinois), two municipalities named Troy (in Lincoln County, Missouri and Madison County, Illinois), and two municipalities named Chesterfield (in St. Louis County, Missouri and Macoupin County, Illinois).

Greater St. Louis contains several separately-chartered, county-level governmental units that exist independently of the hierarchical municipality-county-state structure. These span multiple counties, and even cross state lines. Generally, their jurisdiction is focused on providing specific services that otherwise would be inadequately funded or inefficiently provided. They include the Bi-State Development Agency, the Great Rivers Greenway District, the Metropolitan St. Louis Sewer District, the Metropolitan Zoological Park and Museum District, and the Special School District of St. Louis County. The East-West Gateway Council of Governments is the federally-designated metropolitan planning organization for the region's transportation infrastructure.

The nearby Hannibal–Quincy micropolitan area, Columbia–Jefferson City, Missouri Combined Statistical Area and Springfield, Illinois statistical areas are not located within the metropolitan area as defined by the Office of Management and Budget, but are regionally associated due to their proximity and accessibility to Greater St. Louis.

== Demographics ==
According to the 2010 United States census, in Greater St. Louis there were 2,787,701 people living in 1,143,001 households, of which 748,892 households were families.

=== Race ===
In 2010, 98.2% of the population of Greater St. Louis considered themselves of one race, while 1.8% considered themselves of two or more races. Of those of one race, 76.9% (2,214,298) were white, 18% (519,221) were African American, 2.1% (60,316) were Asian American, and 1.1% (32,542) were American Indian, Native Hawaiian, Pacific Islander American, or some other race. 2.5% (72,797) were Hispanic or Latino Americans of any race.

=== Religion ===
Religion in the St. Louis metropolitan area (2014)
1. Protestantism (47.0%)
2. Roman Catholicism (25.0%)
3. Mormonism (2.00%)
4. Other Christian (1.00%)
5. No religion (21.0%)
6. Judaism (1.00%)
7. Islam (1.00%)
8. Hinduism (1.00%)
9. Other religion (1.00%)

According to a Pew Research study conducted in 2014, 75% of St. Louis metro area residents identify with Christianity and its various denominations, and 4% are adherents of non-Christian religions. 21% have no religion. Of those, about 3% specifically identify as atheists, about 3% identify as agnostics, and about 16% identify as "Nothing in particular".

The religious demographics of the St. Louis metro area are as follows:

- Christianity 75%
  - Protestantism 47%
    - Evangelical Protestant 20%
    - Mainline Protestant 17%
    - Historically Black Protestant 10%
  - Catholicism 25%
  - Mormonism 2%
  - Other Christian 1%
- Non-Christian Faiths 4%
  - Judaism 1%
  - Islam 1%
  - Hinduism 1%
  - Other religion 1%
- Unaffiliated 21%

=== Age and gender ===
As of 2010, the median age for Greater St. Louis is 38.2, and 47.4% of the population was male while 52.6% was female.

Age distribution in Greater St. Louis
Age group	Population	Percent
Total population	2,878,255	100
Under 5 years	181,691	6.3
5 to 9 years	186,507	6.5
10 to 14 years	193,331	6.7
15 to 19 years	202,140	7.0
20 to 24 years	186,331	6.5
25 to 29 years	196,659	6.8
30 to 34 years	182,406	6.3
35 to 39 years	180,523	6.3
40 to 44 years	189,696	6.6
45 to 49 years	222,982	7.7
50 to 54 years	223,937	7.8
55 to 59 years	191,601	6.7
60 to 64 years	155,990	5.4
65 to 69 years	114,805	4.0
70 to 74 years	86,043	3.0
75 to 79 years	71,860	2.5
80 to 84 years	57,691	2.0
85 years and over	54,062	1.9

=== Income and housing statistics ===
As of 2010, Greater St. Louis included 1,264,680 housing units, of which 90.4% (1,143,001) were occupied. Of those units that were vacant, 3.2% (40,553) of units were for rent, 1.6% (19,956) were for sale, 1% (12,575) were unoccupied seasonal homes, and .5% (6,771) were sold or rented but unoccupied. 3.3% (41,884) of units were vacant and not for sale or rent. Of the occupied housing units, 70.6% (807,431) were owner-occupied with 2,075,622 occupants. 29.4% (335,570) of units were rented with 739,749 occupants.

In 2010, the median income for a household in the St. Louis metro was $50,900.

== Transportation ==
Transportation in Greater St. Louis includes road, rail, and air transportation modes connecting the communities in the area with national and international transportation networks. Parts of Greater St. Louis also support a public transportation network that includes bus and light rail. Two commercial airports serve Greater St. Louis including the principal airport, St. Louis Lambert International Airport, and secondary airport MidAmerica St. Louis Airport.

== Education ==
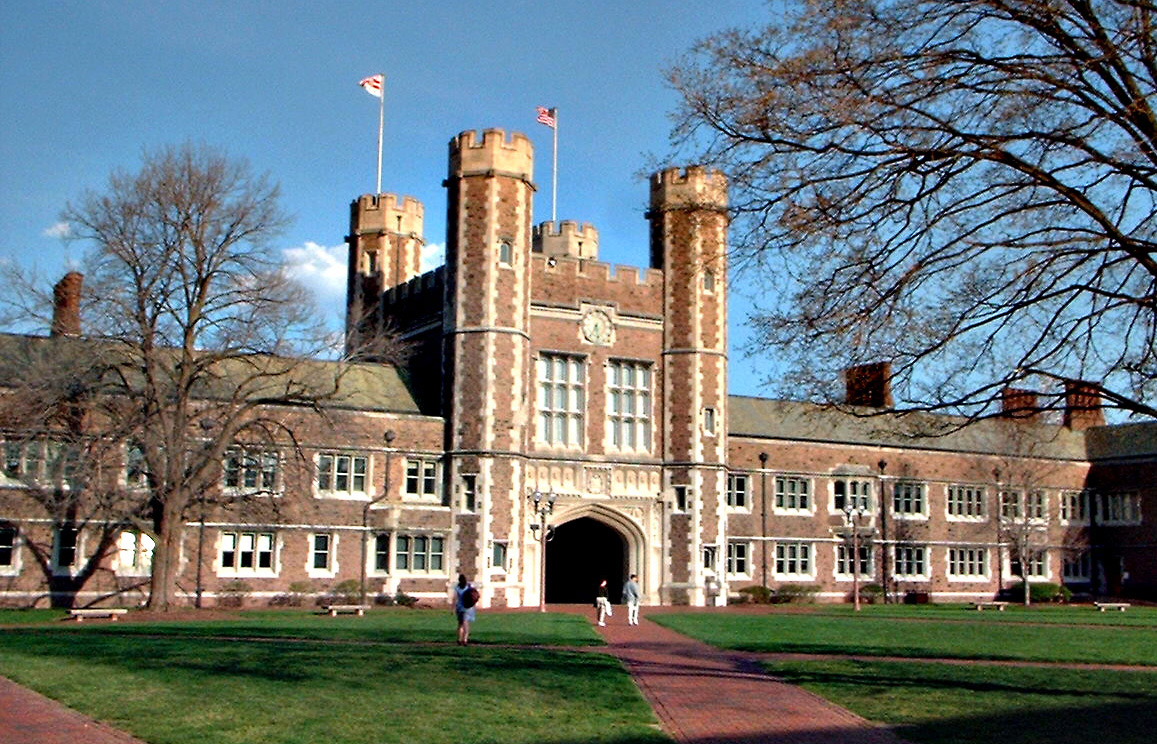
Brookings Hall, the administrative building for Washington University in St. Louis

Education in Greater St. Louis is provided by 132 public school districts, independent private schools, parochial schools, and several public library systems. Greater St. Louis also is home to more than 30 colleges and universities.

== Parks ==
Parks in Greater St. Louis are administered by a variety of state, county, and municipal authorities, and the region also includes the state of Missouri's only National Park, Gateway Arch National Park. Several Missouri state parks in the region and parks owned by St. Louis County are larger than 1,000 acres, while one park in the city of St. Louis, Forest Park, also exceeds 1,000 acres.

== Economy ==
The 2014 Gross Metropolitan Product (GMP) of St. Louis was $145.958 billion, that makes St. Louis the 21st highest GMP in the United States. The three largest categories of employment in Greater St. Louis are trade, transportation, and utilities with 249,000 workers, education and healthcare services with 225,000 workers, and professional and business services with 185,000 workers. Greater St. Louis has more than 1.3 million non-farm workers, representing roughly 15 percent of the non-farm workforce of Missouri and Illinois combined. As of May 2011, 125,000 non-farm workers were unemployed in Greater St. Louis, with an unemployment rate of 8.6 percent. As of the third quarter of 2010, the Greater St. Louis region had more than 73,000 companies or establishments paying wages, while average weekly wages for that period were $833, slightly lower than the U.S. national average of $870.

The largest industry by business conducted was wholesaling with $71 billion, followed by manufacturing with $67 billion, retail trade with $36 billion, and healthcare with $16 billion. The area's largest employer by sector was healthcare with 174,000 workers, followed by retail trade with 152,000 workers and manufacturing with 134,000 workers. Using available data, the combined value of business conducted in the combined statistical area was $213 billion in 2007. With a gross metropolitan product of $112 billion in 2009, St. Louis' economy makes up 40% of the Gross State Product of Missouri.

=== Companies and major employers ===
As of 2021, Greater St. Louis is home to eight of Missouri's ten Fortune 500 companies: Centene (#24), Emerson Electric (#181), Reinsurance Group of America (#207), Edward Jones (#295), Graybar (#399), Ameren (#469), Olin Corporation (#472), and Post Holdings (#474). In addition, the area is home to six Fortune 1,000 companies: Stifel (#633), Peabody Energy (#772), Energizer Holdings (#775), Caleres (#935), Belden (#964), Spire (#999). As well as two of the Top 50 Largest Private Companies in America, as ranked by Forbes: Enterprise Holdings (#9) and World Wide Technology (#20).

Other notable corporations from the area include Wells Fargo Advisors (formerly A.G. Edwards), Energizer Holdings, and Ralcorp. Significant healthcare and biotechnology institutions with operations in St. Louis include Pfizer, the Donald Danforth Plant Science Center, the Solae Company, Sigma-Aldrich, and Multidata Systems International.

Although it was purchased by Belgium-based InBev, Anheuser-Busch continues its presence in the city, as does Mallinckrodt Incorporated in spite of its purchase by Tyco International. General Motors continues to produce cars in the St. Louis area, although Chrysler closed its production facility in the region, which was located in Fenton, Missouri. Despite its purchase by Nestlé, Ralston Purina remained headquartered in St. Louis as a wholly owned subsidiary. St. Louis is also home to Boeing Phantom Works (formerly McDonnell-Douglas). In addition, the Federal Reserve Bank of St. Louis in downtown is one of two federal reserve banks in Missouri.

St. Louis County in particular is home to several area companies. Monsanto Company, formerly a chemical company and now a leader in genetically modified crops, is headquartered in Creve Coeur. Express Scripts, a pharmaceutical benefits management firm, has its corporate headquarters in the suburbs of St. Louis, near the campus of the University of Missouri–St. Louis. Energizer Holdings, the battery company, is headquartered in Town and Country. Enterprise Rent-A-Car's headquarters are located in Clayton. Charter Communications was formerly headquartered in Town and Country, until the executive team moved to Stamford, Connecticut; however, Charter has continued to grow in St. Louis and has upwards of 4,000 employees in the region as of mid-2018. Emerson Electric's headquarters are located in Ferguson. Boeing Integrated Defense Systems is headquartered in Berkeley. Edward Jones Investments is headquartered in Des Peres. From 1994 until its acquisition in 2000 by Tyco International, another chemical company, Mallinckrodt, was headquartered in St. Louis County. Many of the former Mallinckrodt facilities are still in operation by Tyco in the St. Louis suburb of Hazelwood, Missouri. Others are SSM Health Care, Mercy Hospital, and the Tenet Healthcare Corporation chain.

=== Companies headquartered in Greater St. Louis ===
- Air Evac Lifeteam – (O'Fallon, Missouri)
- Alberici Corp. – (Overland, Missouri)
- Allsup – (Belleville, Illinois)
- Alton Steel – (Alton, Illinois)
- Amdocs – (Chesterfield, Missouri)
- Ameren – (St. Louis)
- American Railcar Industries – (St. Charles, Missouri)
- Anheuser-Busch InBev – (St. Louis)
- Answers.com – (University City, Missouri)
- Arch Coal – (Creve Coeur, Missouri)
- Ascension Health – (Edmundson, Missouri)
- Basler Electric – (Highland, Illinois)
- Bayer CropScience – (Creve Coeur, Missouri) [formerly Monsanto]
- Belden – (Clayton, Missouri)
- Bissingers – (St. Louis)
- BJC HealthCare – (St. Louis)
- Blazing Sun Inc. – (St. Louis)
- Bodine Aluminum, Inc. – (Troy, Missouri)
- Boeing Defense, Space & Security – (Berkeley, Missouri)
- Build-A-Bear Workshop – (Overland, Missouri)
- Bunge North America – (Chesterfield, Missouri)
- Caleres – (Clayton, Missouri) [formerly Brown Shoe Co.]
- Centene Corporation – (Clayton, Missouri)
- CitiMortgage – (O'Fallon, Missouri)
- Clayco, Inc. – (Overland, Missouri)
- Concordia Publishing House – (St. Louis)
- Daugherty Systems, Inc. – (Creve Coeur, Missouri)
- Dent Wizard – (St. Louis)
- Dierbergs – (Chesterfield, Missouri)
- Doe Run Company – (Maryland Heights, Missouri)
- Drury Hotels – (Creve Coeur, Missouri)
- Edgewell Personal Care – (Chesterfield, Missouri)
- Edward Jones – (Des Peres, Missouri)
- Emerson Electric Co. – (Ferguson, Missouri)
- Energizer Holdings – (Town and Country, Missouri)
- Equifax Workforce Solutions – (Maryland Heights, Missouri)
- Express Scripts – (Unincorporated north St. Louis County, Missouri)
- FleishmanHillard – (St. Louis)
- Glik's – (Granite City, Illinois)
- Graybar Electric Company – (Clayton, Missouri)
- HOK – (St. Louis)
- Hussmann Corp. – (Bridgeton, Missouri)
- Imo's Pizza – (St. Louis)
- Karmak, Inc. – (Carlinville, Illinois)
- The Korte Company – (Highland, Illinois)
- Luxco – (St. Louis)
- McCarthy Building Companies, Inc. – (Ladue, Missouri)
- McCormack Baron Salazar – (St. Louis)
- Mallinckrodt Pharmaceuticals – (Hazelwood, Missouri)
- MB Motorsports – (St. Louis)
- Maritz, LLC – (Fenton, Missouri)
- Mastercard - Global Operations Headquarters – (O'Fallon, Missouri)
- Mercy Health – (Chesterfield, Missouri)
- Metro East Industries – (Alorton, Illinois)
- MilliporeSigma – (St. Louis)
- MiTek – (Chesterfield, Missouri)
- Nestlé Purina PetCare – (St. Louis)
- Nidec Motor Corporation – (Ferguson, Missouri)
- Nike IHM – (Weldon Spring, Missouri)
- Novus International – (Weldon Spring, Missouri)
- Olin Corp. – (Clayton, Missouri)
- Panera Bread (St. Louis Bread Co.) – (Sunset Hills, Missouri)
- Peabody Energy – (St. Louis)
- PGAV – (St. Louis)
- Post Holdings – (Brentwood, Missouri)
- Prairie Farms Dairy – (Edwardsville, Illinois)
- Rabo AgriFinance – (Chesterfield, Missouri)
- Ralcorp – (St. Louis)
- Rawlings Sporting Goods – (Town and Country, Missouri)
- Reinsurance Group of America – (Chesterfield, Missouri)
- ReproMAX – (Chesterfield, Missouri)
- Roberts Broadcasting – (St. Louis)
- ROHO Group – (Belleville, Illinois)
- RoverTown – (St. Louis)
- Royal Canin USA – (St. Charles, Missouri)
- Save-A-Lot – (St. Ann, Missouri)
- Schnucks – (Maryland Heights, Missouri)
- Soft Surroundings – (Creve Coeur, Missouri)
- Spire Inc – (St. Louis) [formerly Laclede Group, Inc.]
- SSM Health – (Creve Coeur, Missouri)
- Stifel Nicolaus – (St. Louis)
- Suddenlink Communications – (Town and Country, Missouri)
- Tacony Corporation – (Fenton, Missouri)
- Test Drive Technologies (St. Louis)
- Treat Planet – (Earth City, Missouri)
- TricorBraun – (Creve Coeur, Missouri)
- True Manufacturing Company – (O'Fallon, Missouri)
- Vi-Jon Laboratories – (Overland, Missouri)
- Wells Fargo Advisors – (St. Louis) [formerly Wachovia Securities and prior to that A.G. Edwards]
- Wood River Refinery – (Roxana, Illinois)
- World Wide Technology – (Maryland Heights, Missouri)

== Sports ==
The Greater St. Louis area is currently home to four professional sports teams:

- St. Louis Blues (NHL) – won 2019 Stanley Cup Final
- St. Louis Cardinals (MLB) – won 19 National League pennants and 11 World Series championships
- St. Louis Battlehawks (UFL)
- St. Louis City SC (MLS)

Club	Sport	First season	League	Venue
St. Louis Cardinals	Baseball	1882	Major League Baseball	Busch Stadium
St. Louis Blues	Ice hockey	1967	National Hockey League	Enterprise Center
St. Louis Battlehawks	American football	2020	United Football League	The Dome at America's Center
St. Louis City SC	Soccer	2023	Major League Soccer	Energizer Park

== See also ==
- Cuisine of St. Louis
- List of colleges and universities in Greater St. Louis
- List of high schools in Greater St. Louis
- List of metropolitan areas of Missouri
- List of people from St. Louis
- Missouri census statistical areas
- Category:People from St. Louis
