= Missouri's 3rd congressional district =

U.S. House district for Missouri

Coordinates: 38°34′41″N 91°33′48″W

- Interactive map of district boundaries since January 3, 2023
- Representative: Bob Onder; R–Lake St. Louis
- Population (2025): 785,633
- Median household income: $84,827
- Ethnicity: 84.6% White; 4.8% Two or more races; 4.7% Black; 3.3% Hispanic; 2.0% Asian; 0.6% other
- Cook PVI: R+13

Missouri's third congressional district is in the eastern and central portion of the state. It stretches from the southern part of Columbia (including the University of Missouri) and the state capital of Jefferson City in the west to St. Charles County (including the large suburbs of St. Charles, St. Peters and Wentzville) and western Jefferson County in the east. The district took its current form in 2023, when Cooper and parts of Boone counties were added to the district, while Franklin and most of Warren counties were instead drawn into the 2nd district, and much of Lincoln County moved to the 6th district. Its current representative is Republican Bob Onder.

The Columbia portion in the 3rd includes the University of Missouri. The northern portion of the city is in the 4th district.

From 1953 to 2013, the 3rd had been located in the southern portion of the St. Louis area, including the southern third of St. Louis City, and had a dramatically different political history from the current 3rd. Its best-known congressman is Dick Gephardt, who represented the district for 28 years until his retirement from Congress.

Following a dramatic drop in the population of St. Louis in the 2010 United States census, Missouri lost a congressional seat effective in 2013. Redistricting maps indicated that the 3rd district would be dismantled. The 3rd's home base in St. Louis would be absorbed by Missouri's 1st congressional district. Much of the district outside the St. Louis area would be drawn into the 8th district. Meanwhile, the new 3rd included most of the territory currently in the 9th district, which was dissolved.

== Recent election results from statewide races ==
Year	Office	Results
2008	President	McCain 55% - 44%
2012	President	Romney 62% - 38%
2012	Senate	McCaskill 48% - 45%
2012	Governor	Nixon 49% - 48%
2016	President	Trump 63% - 32%
2016	Senate	Blunt 53% - 42%
2016	Governor	Greitens 54% - 42%
2016	Lt. Governor	Parson 56% - 39%
2016	Secretary of State	Ashcroft 62% - 34%
2016	Attorney General	Hawley 64% - 36%
2018	Senate	Hawley 56% - 41%
2018	Auditor	Galloway 48% - 46%
2020	President	Trump 62% - 36%
2020	Governor	Parson 62% - 35%
2020	Lt. Governor	Kehoe 65% - 32%
2020	Secretary of State	Ashcroft 66% - 31%
2020	Treasurer	Fitzpatrick 65% - 32%
2020	Attorney General	Schmitt 65% - 32%
2022	Senate	Schmitt 59% - 38%
2024	President	Trump 63% - 36%
2024	Senate	Hawley 59% - 39%
2024	Governor	Kehoe 64% - 33%
2024	Lt. Governor	Wasinger 62% - 34%
2024	Secretary of State	Hoskins 62% - 36%
2024	Treasurer	Malek 62% - 33%
2024	Attorney General	Bailey 64% - 33%

== Composition ==
For the 118th and successive Congresses (based on redistricting following the 2020 census), the district contains all or portions of the following counties and communities:

Boone County (7)

Ashland, Columbia (part; also 4th), Hartsburg, Huntsdale, McBaine, Pierpont, Rocheport

Callaway County (8)

All 8 communities

Camden County (4)

Lake Ozark (shared with Miller County), Osage Beach (part; also 4th), Sunrise Beach (part; also 4th), Village of Four Seasons

Cole County (8)

All 8 communities

Cooper County (8)

All 8 communities

Crawford County (9)

All 9 communities

Gasconade County (6)

All 6 communities

Jefferson County (14)

Briarwood Estates, Byrnes Mill, Cedar Hill, Cedar Hill Lakes, De Soto, Eureka (part; also 2nd; shared with St. Louis County), High Ridge, Hillsboro, LaBarque Creek, Lake Tekakwitha, Parkdale, Peaceful Village, Raintree Plantation, Scotsdale

Maries County (3)

All 3 communities

Miller County (10)

All 10 communities

Moniteau County (5)

All 5 communities

Montgomery County (11)

All 11 communities

Osage County (8)

All 8 communities

St. Charles County (13)

Cottleville, Flint Hill, Foristell (part; also 2nd; shared with Warren County), Josephville, Lake St. Louis (part; also 2nd), O'Fallon (part; also 2nd), Portage Des Sioux, St. Charles, St. Paul, St. Peters, Weldon Spring (part; also 2nd), Wentzville (part; also 2nd), West Alton

Warren County (13)

Foristell (part; also 2nd; shared with St. Charles County), Warrenton (part; also 2nd), Wright City (part; also 2nd)

Washington County (5)

All 5 communities

== List of members representing the district ==
Member	Party	Years	Cong ress	Electoral history	District location
District created March 4, 1847
James S. Green (Canton)	Democratic	March 4, 1847 – March 3, 1851	30th 31st	Elected in 1846. Re-elected in 1848. Retired.	
John G. Miller (Boonville)	Whig	March 4, 1851 – March 3, 1853	32nd	Elected in 1850. Redistricted to the 5th district.	
James J. Lindley (Monticello)	Whig	March 4, 1853 – March 3, 1855	33rd 34th	Elected in 1852. Re-elected in 1854. Retired.	
James J. Lindley (Monticello)	Opposition	March 4, 1855 – March 3, 1857	33rd 34th	Elected in 1852. Re-elected in 1854. Retired.	
Vacant		March 4, 1857 – December 7, 1857	35th		
John B. Clark (Fayette)	Democratic	December 7, 1857 – July 13, 1861	35th 36th 37th	Elected after James S. Green was elected to US Senate prior to being seated. Re-elected in 1858. Re-elected in 1860. Expelled after taking up arms against the Union.	
Vacant		July 13, 1861 – January 20, 1862	37th		
William A. Hall (Huntsville)	Democratic	January 20, 1862 – March 3, 1863	37th	Elected to finish Clark's term. Redistricted to the 8th district.	
John W. Noell (Perryville)	Unconditional Unionist	March 4, 1863 – March 14, 1863	38th	Redistricted from the 7th district and Re-elected in 1862. Died.	
Vacant		March 14, 1863 – December 7, 1863	38th		
John G. Scott (Irondale)	Democratic	December 7, 1863 – March 3, 1865	38th	Elected to finish Noell's term. Retired.	
Thomas E. Noell (Perryville)	Republican	March 4, 1865 – March 3, 1867	39th 40th	Elected in 1864. Re-elected in 1866. Died.	
Thomas E. Noell (Perryville)	Democratic	March 4, 1867 – October 3, 1867	39th 40th	Elected in 1864. Re-elected in 1866. Died.	
Vacant		October 3, 1867 – December 17, 1867	40th		
James R. McCormick (Arcadia)	Democratic	December 17, 1867 – March 3, 1873	40th 41st 42nd	Elected to finish Noell's term. Re-elected in 1868. Re-elected in 1870. Retired.	
William H. Stone (St. Louis)	Democratic	March 4, 1873 – March 3, 1877	43rd 44th	Elected in 1872. Re-elected in 1874. Retired.	
Lyne Metcalfe (St. Louis)	Republican	March 4, 1877 – March 3, 1879	45th	Elected in 1876. Lost re-election.	
Richard G. Frost (St. Louis)	Democratic	March 4, 1879 – March 2, 1883	46th 47th	Elected in 1878. Re-elected in 1880. Retired but lost contested election before next term began.	
Gustavus Sessinghaus (St. Louis)	Republican	March 2, 1883 – March 3, 1883	47th	Won contested election. Lost re-election.	
Alexander M. Dockery (Gallatin)	Democratic	March 4, 1883 – March 3, 1899	48th 49th 50th 51st 52nd 53rd 54th 55th	Elected in 1882. Re-elected in 1884. Re-elected in 1886. Re-elected in 1888. Re-elected in 1890. Re-elected in 1892. Re-elected in 1894. Re-elected in 1896. Retired to run for governor.	
John Dougherty (Liberty)	Democratic	March 4, 1899 – March 3, 1905	56th 57th 58th	Elected in 1898. Re-elected in 1900. Re-elected in 1902. Lost renomination.	
Frank B. Klepper (Kingston)	Republican	March 4, 1905 – March 3, 1907	59th	Elected in 1904. Lost re-election.	
Joshua W. Alexander (Gallatin)	Democratic	March 4, 1907 – December 15, 1919	60th 61st 62nd 63rd 64th 65th 66th	Elected in 1906. Re-elected in 1908. Re-elected in 1910. Re-elected in 1912. Re-elected in 1914. Re-elected in 1916. Re-elected in 1918. Resigned when appointed US Secretary of Commerce	
Vacant		December 15, 1919 – February 14, 1920	66th		
Jacob L. Milligan (Richmond)	Democratic	February 14, 1920 – March 3, 1921	66th	Elected to finish Alexander's term. Lost re-election.	
Henry F. Lawrence (Cameron)	Republican	March 4, 1921 – March 3, 1923	67th	Elected in 1920. Lost re-election.	
Jacob L. Milligan (Richmond)	Democratic	March 4, 1923 – March 3, 1933	68th 69th 70th 71st 72nd	Elected in 1922. Re-elected in 1924. Re-elected in 1926. Re-elected in 1928. Re-elected in 1930. Redistricted to the at-large district.	
District inactive		March 4, 1933 – January 3, 1935	73rd	All representatives elected At-large on a general ticket.	
Richard M. Duncan (St. Joseph)	Democratic	January 3, 1935 – January 3, 1943	74th 75th 76th 77th	Redistricted from the at-large district and re-elected in 1934. Re-elected in 1936. Re-elected in 1938. Re-elected in 1940. Lost re-election.	
William C. Cole (St. Joseph)	Republican	January 3, 1943 – January 3, 1949	78th 79th 80th	Elected in 1942. Re-elected in 1944. Re-elected in 1946. Lost re-election.	
Phil J. Welch (St. Joseph)	Democratic	January 3, 1949 – January 3, 1953	81st 82nd	Elected in 1948. Re-elected in 1950. Retired to run for governor.	
Leonor Sullivan (St. Louis)	Democratic	January 3, 1953 – January 3, 1977	83rd 84th 85th 86th 87th 88th 89th 90th 91st 92nd 93rd 94th	Elected in 1952. Re-elected in 1954. Re-elected in 1956. Re-elected in 1958. Re-elected in 1960. Re-elected in 1962. Re-elected in 1964. Re-elected in 1966. Re-elected in 1968. Re-elected in 1970. Re-elected in 1972. Re-elected in 1974. Retired.	1953–1963 [data missing]
Leonor Sullivan (St. Louis)	Democratic	January 3, 1953 – January 3, 1977	83rd 84th 85th 86th 87th 88th 89th 90th 91st 92nd 93rd 94th	Elected in 1952. Re-elected in 1954. Re-elected in 1956. Re-elected in 1958. Re-elected in 1960. Re-elected in 1962. Re-elected in 1964. Re-elected in 1966. Re-elected in 1968. Re-elected in 1970. Re-elected in 1972. Re-elected in 1974. Retired.	1963–1973 [data missing]
Leonor Sullivan (St. Louis)	Democratic	January 3, 1953 – January 3, 1977	83rd 84th 85th 86th 87th 88th 89th 90th 91st 92nd 93rd 94th	Elected in 1952. Re-elected in 1954. Re-elected in 1956. Re-elected in 1958. Re-elected in 1960. Re-elected in 1962. Re-elected in 1964. Re-elected in 1966. Re-elected in 1968. Re-elected in 1970. Re-elected in 1972. Re-elected in 1974. Retired.	1973–1983 [data missing]
Dick Gephardt (St. Louis)	Democratic	January 3, 1977 – January 3, 2005	95th 96th 97th 98th 99th 100th 101st 102nd 103rd 104th 105th 106th 107th 108th	Elected in 1976. Re-elected in 1978. Re-elected in 1980. Re-elected in 1982. Re-elected in 1984. Re-elected in 1986. Re-elected in 1988. Re-elected in 1990. Re-elected in 1992. Re-elected in 1994. Re-elected in 1996. Re-elected in 1998. Re-elected in 2000. Re-elected in 2002. Retired to run for Democratic nominee for president.	1973–1983 [data missing]
Dick Gephardt (St. Louis)	Democratic	January 3, 1977 – January 3, 2005	95th 96th 97th 98th 99th 100th 101st 102nd 103rd 104th 105th 106th 107th 108th	Elected in 1976. Re-elected in 1978. Re-elected in 1980. Re-elected in 1982. Re-elected in 1984. Re-elected in 1986. Re-elected in 1988. Re-elected in 1990. Re-elected in 1992. Re-elected in 1994. Re-elected in 1996. Re-elected in 1998. Re-elected in 2000. Re-elected in 2002. Retired to run for Democratic nominee for president.	1983–1993 [data missing]
Dick Gephardt (St. Louis)	Democratic	January 3, 1977 – January 3, 2005	95th 96th 97th 98th 99th 100th 101st 102nd 103rd 104th 105th 106th 107th 108th	Elected in 1976. Re-elected in 1978. Re-elected in 1980. Re-elected in 1982. Re-elected in 1984. Re-elected in 1986. Re-elected in 1988. Re-elected in 1990. Re-elected in 1992. Re-elected in 1994. Re-elected in 1996. Re-elected in 1998. Re-elected in 2000. Re-elected in 2002. Retired to run for Democratic nominee for president.	1993–2003 [data missing]
Dick Gephardt (St. Louis)	Democratic	January 3, 1977 – January 3, 2005	95th 96th 97th 98th 99th 100th 101st 102nd 103rd 104th 105th 106th 107th 108th	Elected in 1976. Re-elected in 1978. Re-elected in 1980. Re-elected in 1982. Re-elected in 1984. Re-elected in 1986. Re-elected in 1988. Re-elected in 1990. Re-elected in 1992. Re-elected in 1994. Re-elected in 1996. Re-elected in 1998. Re-elected in 2000. Re-elected in 2002. Retired to run for Democratic nominee for president.	2003–2013
Russ Carnahan (St. Louis)	Democratic	January 3, 2005 – January 3, 2013	109th 110th 111th 112th	Elected in 2004. Re-elected in 2006. Re-elected in 2008. Re-elected in 2010. Redistricted to the 1st district and lost renomination.	2003–2013
Blaine Luetkemeyer (St. Elizabeth)	Republican	January 3, 2013 – January 3, 2025	113th 114th 115th 116th 117th 118th	Redistricted from the 9th district and re-elected in 2012. Re-elected in 2014. Re-elected in 2016. Re-elected in 2018. Re-elected in 2020. Re-elected in 2022. Retired.	2013–2023
Blaine Luetkemeyer (St. Elizabeth)	Republican	January 3, 2013 – January 3, 2025	113th 114th 115th 116th 117th 118th	Redistricted from the 9th district and re-elected in 2012. Re-elected in 2014. Re-elected in 2016. Re-elected in 2018. Re-elected in 2020. Re-elected in 2022. Retired.	2023–present
Bob Onder (Lake St. Louis)	Republican	January 3, 2025 – present	119th	Elected in 2024. Re-elected in 2026.	2023–present

== Recent election results ==
=== 2012 ===
Missouri's 3rd congressional district, 2012
Party	Candidate	Votes	%
Republican	Blaine Luetkemeyer (incumbent)	214,843	63.5
Democratic	Eric C. Mayer	111,189	32.8
Libertarian	Steven Wilson	12,353	3.7
Total votes		338,385	100.0
Republican hold			

=== 2014 ===
Missouri's 3rd congressional district, 2014
Party	Candidate	Votes	%
Republican	Blaine Luetkemeyer (incumbent)	130,940	68.3
Democratic	Courtney Denton	52,021	27.2
Libertarian	Steven Hedrick	8,593	4.5
Independent	Harold Davis (write-in)	66	0.0
Total votes		191,620	100.0
Republican hold			

=== 2016 ===
Missouri's 3rd congressional district, 2016
Party	Candidate	Votes	%
Republican	Blaine Luetkemeyer (incumbent)	249,865	67.8
Democratic	Kevin Miller	102,891	27.9
Libertarian	Dan Hogan	11,962	3.3
Constitution	Doanita Simmons	3,605	1.0
Independent	Harold Davis (write-in)	10	0.0
Total votes		368,333	100.0
Republican hold			

=== 2018 ===
Missouri's 3rd congressional district, 2018
Party	Candidate	Votes	%
Republican	Blaine Luetkemeyer (incumbent)	211,243	65.1
Democratic	Katy Geppert	106,589	32.8
Libertarian	Donald Stolle	6,776	2.1
Total votes		324,608	100.0
Republican hold			

=== 2020 ===
Missouri's 3rd congressional district, 2020
Party	Candidate	Votes	%
Republican	Blaine Luetkemeyer (incumbent)	282,866	69.4
Democratic	Megan Rezabek	116,095	28.5
Libertarian	Leonard J. Steinman II	8,344	2.1
Write-in		43	0.0
Total votes		407,348	100.0
Republican hold			

=== 2022 ===
2022 Missouri's 3rd congressional district election
Party	Candidate	Votes	%
Republican	Blaine Luetkemeyer (incumbent)	180,746	65.1
Democratic	Bethany Mann	96,851	34.9
Total votes		277,597	100.0
Republican hold			

=== 2024 ===
2024 Missouri's 3rd congressional district election
Party	Candidate	Votes	%
Republican	Bob Onder	240,620	61.3
Democratic	Bethany Mann	138,532	35.3
Libertarian	Jordan Rowden	9,298	2.4
Green	William Hastings	4,013	1.0
Total votes		392,463	100.0
Republican hold			

== See also ==
- Missouri's congressional districts
- List of United States congressional districts
