= Hog Lake =

Hog Lake may refer to the following bodies of water:

Canada:

- Hog Lake, Argyle, Nova Scotia
- Hog Lake, Region of Queens Municipality, Nova Scotia
- Hog Lake (Parry Sound District), near Kearney, Ontario
- Hog Lake (Manitoulin District), Manitoulin District, Ontario

United States:

- Hog Lake, near Dales, California
- Hog Lake (Florida)
- Hog Lake, Santa Fe Township, Clinton County, Illinois
- Hog Lake, LaPorte County, Indiana
- Hog Lake, Jamestown Township, Steuben County, Indiana
- Hog Lake, near Sumner, Missouri, drained in 1911
- Hog Canyon Lake, also known as Hog Lake, Spokane County, Washington
