= High Ridge, Missouri =

- Census-designated place
- Location of High Ridge, Missouri
- Coordinates: 38°27′39″N 90°32′02″W
- Country: United States
- State: Missouri
- County: Jefferson

Area
  - Total: 3.77 sq mi (9.77 km^{2})
  - Land: 3.77 sq mi (9.77 km^{2})
  - Water: 0 sq mi (0.00 km^{2})
- Elevation: 922 ft (281 m)

Population (2020)
  - Total: 4,242
  - Density: 1,124.9/sq mi (434.33/km^{2})
- Time zone: UTC-6 (Central (CST))
  - Summer (DST): UTC-5 (CDT)
- ZIP code: 63049
- Area code: 636
- FIPS code: 29-32140
- GNIS feature ID: 2393049

High Ridge is an unincorporated community and census-designated place (CDP) in Jefferson County, Missouri, United States. The population was 4,305 at the 2010 census.

== History ==
A post office called High Ridge has been in operation since 1856. The community was so named on account of its lofty elevation.

== Geography ==
High Ridge is located in northern Jefferson County and is bordered to the north by Peaceful Village and Parkdale. Missouri Route 30 runs through the community, leading northeast 23 miles (37 km) to downtown St. Louis and southwest 31 miles (50 km) to St. Clair.

High Ridge is a nine-armed local topographic high, capped with the Bushberg Sandstone and part of the Burlington Escarpment. The high point of the ridge is located near the Senior Center just north of High Ridge Boulevard (old Gravois/Missouri Highway 30). Flowing off this topographic high are Antire Creek, Rock Creek, Williams Creek, Saline Creek, Sugar Creek, Romaine Creek, Bear Creek, Little Antire Creek, and lesser streams. The high ground is bounded to the west by the Big River and to the west, north, and east by the Meramec River. The ridge is very cherty, and poor for conventional farming, hence the area became known for fruit trees, strawberries, blackberries, and truck farm produce which were sold in St. Louis.

According to the United States Census Bureau, the High Ridge CDP has a total area of 3.80 square miles (9.85 km^{2}), all land.

== Demographics ==
Historical population
Census	Pop.	Note	%±
2000	4,236		—
2010	4,305		1.6%
2020	4,242		−1.5%
U.S. Decennial Census

=== 2020 census ===
As of the 2020 census, High Ridge had a population of 4,242. The median age was 42.4 years. 20.7% of residents were under the age of 18 and 16.7% of residents were 65 years of age or older. For every 100 females there were 99.0 males, and for every 100 females age 18 and over there were 94.9 males age 18 and over.

91.2% of residents lived in urban areas, while 8.8% lived in rural areas.

There were 1,766 households in High Ridge, of which 27.6% had children under the age of 18 living in them. Of all households, 46.0% were married-couple households, 20.7% were households with a male householder and no spouse or partner present, and 24.0% were households with a female householder and no spouse or partner present. About 27.6% of all households were made up of individuals and 11.1% had someone living alone who was 65 years of age or older.

There were 1,863 housing units, of which 5.2% were vacant. The homeowner vacancy rate was 1.5% and the rental vacancy rate was 10.4%.

Racial composition as of the 2020 census
Race	Number	Percent
White	3,866	91.1%
Black or African American	19	0.4%
American Indian and Alaska Native	9	0.2%
Asian	50	1.2%
Native Hawaiian and Other Pacific Islander	0	0.0%
Some other race	37	0.9%
Two or more races	261	6.2%
Hispanic or Latino (of any race)	124	2.9%

=== 2000 census ===
As of the 2000 census, there were 4,236 people, 1,556 households, and 1,145 families residing in the CDP. The population density was 1,061.0 inhabitants per square mile (409.7/km^{2}). There were 1,609 housing units at an average density of 403.0 per square mile (155.6/km^{2}). The racial makeup of the CDP was 97.78% White, 0.31% African American, 0.12% Native American, 0.40% Asian, 0.14% from other races, and 1.25% from two or more races. Hispanic or Latino of any race were 1.16% of the population.

There were 1,556 households, out of which 37.7% had children under the age of 18 living with them, 57.7% were married couples living together, 11.4% had a female householder with no husband present, and 26.4% were non-families. 20.8% of all households were made up of individuals, and 5.6% had someone living alone who was 65 years of age or older. The average household size was 2.70 and the average family size was 3.13.

In the CDP, the population was spread out, with 27.5% under the age of 18, 9.1% from 18 to 24, 33.3% from 25 to 44, 22.1% from 45 to 64, and 8.0% who were 65 years of age or older. The median age was 35 years. For every 100 females, there were 101.2 males. For every 100 females age 18 and over, there were 96.7 males.

The median income for a household in the CDP was $46,742, and the median income for a family was $50,125. Males had a median income of $36,053 versus $27,394 for females. The per capita income for the CDP was $17,959. About 4.7% of families and 5.4% of the population were below the poverty line, including 7.3% of those under age 18 and 18.9% of those age 65 or over.

== Arts and culture ==
High Ridge has a public library, a branch of the Jefferson County Library.

== Education ==
Northwest R-I School District operates three elementary schools in High Ridge: High Ridge Elementary, Brennan Woods Elementary, and Murphy Elementary.

== Notable people ==
- Bill Alter, Missouri state senator
- David Casteel, Missouri state representative
- Michael Chandler, professional MMA fighter, NCAA wrestling All American (University of Missouri)
- Sarah Haskins, Olympic triathlete
