= Country Club Hills =

Country Club Hills may refer to:

- Country Club Hills, Illinois
- Country Club Hills, Missouri
- A neighborhood in Raleigh, North Carolina
- A neighborhood in Arlington County, Virginia
