= TricorBraun =

American packaging distributor

- Founded: 1902
- Headquarters: St. Louis
- Key people: Kevin Weadick (CEO and president)
- Website: www.tricorbraun.com

TricorBraun is an American distributor of rigid packaging. Founded in 1902, it was acquired by CHS Capital and Management in 1999 and by AEA Investors in 2016. In 2016 and 2017, the company stated that it had approximately $1 billion in annual revenues.

== History ==
The company was founded in Missouri in 1902, and is currently headquartered in St. Louis. According to the St. Louis Post-Dispatch, it was the twenty-sixth largest corporation based in the greater St. Louis area in 2018. As of 2008, the company had thirty-two offices in North America and Asia, and as of 2017 the company had about forty locations, including offices outside of North America in London, UK; Mumbai, India; Guangzhou, China; Hong Kong; and Mexico.

The company employs about one thousand people overall, and has annual sales of about $1 billion in rigid plastic packaging. Its packaging largely consists of blow molded containers, in addition to some thermoformed packaging. Packaging is produced in both glass and plastic, and includes containers, closures, dispensers, tubes, and other types of packaging. TricorBraun also has a research and development section, which develops new forms of packaging for industries like cosmetics.

== Acquisitions ==
CHS Capital and Management acquired TricorBraun in 1999. CHS sold the company to AEA Investors in 2004, repurchased it in 2006, and sold it again to AEA in November 2016. In 2016, TricorBraun itself purchased The Packaging Design Group. In 2017 the TricorBraun acquired Taipak, a Canadian company that manufactures flexible packaging, entering the flexible packaging market for the first time. That year TricorBraun also acquired the Pennsylvania-based Continental Packaging Associates, and the Canadian firm Salbro. It also began a partnership with Amfora, forming TricorBraun South America SAS. Between the mid-1990s and mid-2010s, the company acquired fourteen different companies. In August 2023, it was announced TricorBraun had acquired the Longmont-headquartered aluminum cans and packaging supplies company, CanSource.

In 2025, Kevin Weadick became president and CEO replacing Court Carruthers. In 2017 Court Carruthers became the president and CEO of the company, replacing Keith Strope, who had held the positions since 2002. Carruthers is now the company's vice chairman, Strope is the company’s executive chairman, and the chairman emeritus is Ken Kranzberg.

== See also ==
- Gateway Packaging
