= Vi-Jon Laboratories =

American manufacturer of Germ-X and others

- Type: Private
- Industry: Consumer goods
- Founded: 1908; 118 years ago
- Founder: John B. Brunner
- Headquarters: 8800 Page Ave. St. Louis, Missouri, U.S. 63114
- Key people: Gerald G. Bowe (CEO); Randy Veal (CFO); Tim Williams (COO)
- Products: Personal care products
- Brands: Germ-X
- Website: www.vijon.com

Vi-Jon Laboratories is an American health and beauty care company that produces both private label and brand name products.

Headquartered in the St. Louis suburb of Overland, it operates five manufacturing and distribution centers in Missouri and Tennessee. Its products are supplied nationwide to retailers such as Kroger, Target and Walgreens.

In the United States, the company markets a line of hand sanitizers under its flagship brand Germ-X, as well as a line of isopropyl alcohol products under the brand Swan. Both products have become widely sold during the COVID-19 pandemic.

== History ==
Vi-Jon was founded as Peroxide Specialty Company in 1908 by John B. Brunner. Vi-Jon was acquired by investment firm Berkshire Partners in 2006.

In 2006 Procter & Gamble filed a lawsuit against Vi-Jon alleging that Vi-Jon copied the look of Crest Pro-Health mouth wash; the parties settled a few months later, with Vi-Jon agreeing to withdraw its product from the market, to not use bottle designs that are confusingly similar to those of P&G, to not make "compare to Crest Pro-Health" or gingivitis efficacy claims without specific testing to support these claims, and to pay P&G.

In August 2014, Berkshire announced its intention to sell Vi-Jon. As of September 2020, the company became 100% employee-owned. In August 2026, Vi-Jon filed for Chapter 11 bankruptcy protection, listing assets between $1 million and $10 million and liabilities between $500 million and $1 billion.

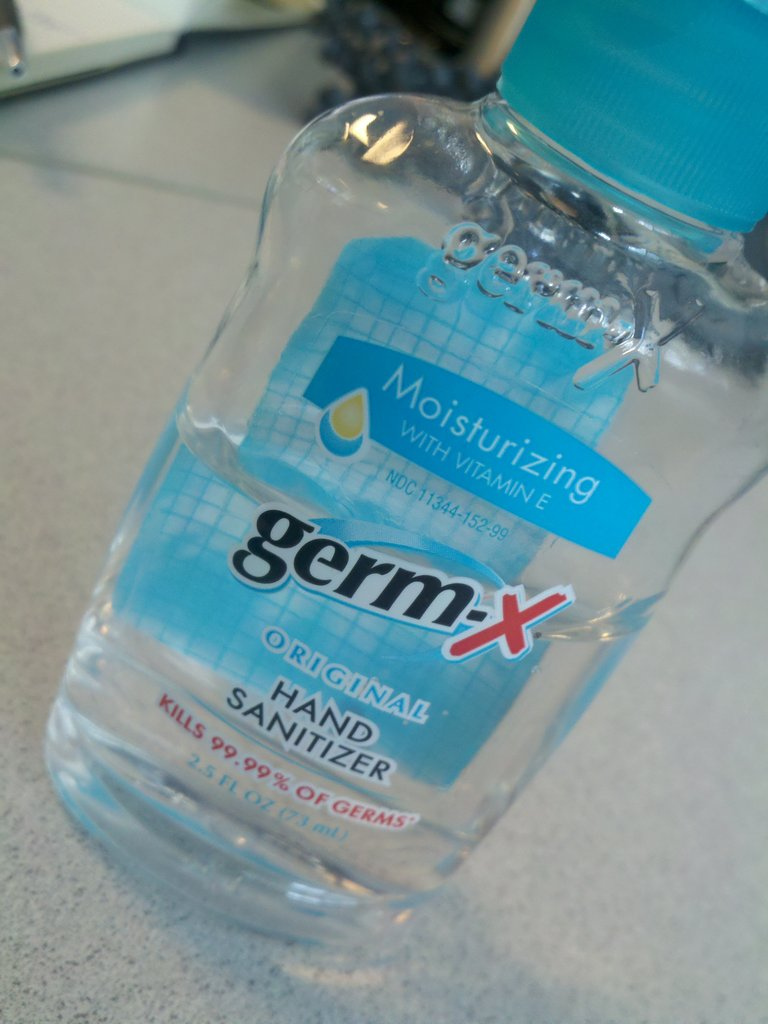
A bottle of Germ-X, a product of Vi-Jon Laboratories

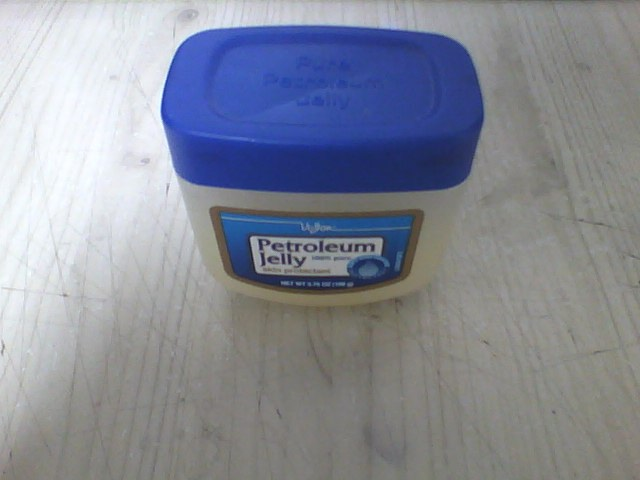
Petroleum jelly by Vi-Jon Laboratories
