= Jennings School District =

School district in Missouri, United States

Address
- 2559 Dorwood Jennings, Missouri, 63136; United States

District information
- Type: Local school district
- Grades: PK–12
- Superintendent: Paula Knight
- Schools: 7

Other information
- Website: jenningsk12.org

Jennings School District (JSD) is a school district headquartered in Jennings, Missouri.

The district, located in St. Louis County, includes most of Jennings, as well as Country Club Hills and Flordell Hills.

== History ==
In 1968, the school district experimented with a program where it screens each prospective kindergartener with an MYK test so it can determine the optimal educational course. By 1974 the district began screening all students entering kindergarten with MYK.

Art McCoy became superintendent in 2016. He retired effective June 30, 2021. Paula D. Knight became the next superintendent on July 1, 2021.

== Schools ==
=== Secondary schools ===
- Jennings Senior High & College Prep Academy
- Early College Academy - Located at Florissant Valley Community College
- Rose Mary Johnson Jennings Junior High & College Prep Academy

=== Elementary schools ===
- Fairview Primary and Intermediate Schools
- Kenneth C. Hanrahan Elementary School
- Northview Elementary School
- Woodland Elementary School

=== Other facilities ===
- Gore Community Center

== Notable alumni ==
- Joe Johnson (Jennings Senior High), American football player
