= Bartelso, Illinois =

- Village
- Location of Bartelso in Clinton County, Illinois.
- Coordinates: 38°32′17″N 89°27′41″W
- Country: United States
- State: Illinois
- County: Clinton
- Township: Santa Fe

Government
  - Village president: John B Wilken

Area
  - Total: 0.66 sq mi (1.70 km^{2})
  - Land: 0.66 sq mi (1.70 km^{2})
  - Water: 0 sq mi (0.00 km^{2})
- Elevation: 443 ft (135 m)

Population (2020)
  - Total: 635
  - Density: 966.2/sq mi (373.06/km^{2})
- Time zone: UTC-6 (CST)
  - Summer (DST): UTC-5 (CDT)
- ZIP code: 62218
- FIPS code: 17-04000
- GNIS feature ID: 2398040
- Website: bartelsoil.org

Bartelso is a village in Clinton County, Illinois, United States. The population was 635 at the 2020 census, up from 595 at the 2010 census.

== Geography ==
Illinois Route 161 passes through the village, leading east 18 miles (29 km) to Centralia and west 4 miles (6 km) to Germantown. Carlyle, the Clinton County seat, is 8 miles (13 km) to the northeast.

According to the 2021 census gazetteer files, Bartelso has a total area of 0.43 square miles (1.11 km^{2}), all land.

== Demographics ==
Historical population
Census	Pop.	Note	%±
1900	274		—
1910	344		25.5%
1920	246		−28.5%
1930	256		4.1%
1940	300		17.2%
1950	304		1.3%
1960	370		21.7%
1970	439		18.6%
1980	389		−11.4%
1990	412		5.9%
2000	593		43.9%
2010	595		0.3%
2020	635		6.7%
U.S. Decennial Census

As of the 2020 census there were 635 people, 325 households, and 237 families residing in the village. The population density was 1,473.32 inhabitants per square mile (568.85/km^{2}). There were 244 housing units at an average density of 566.13 per square mile (218.58/km^{2}). The racial makeup of the village was 96.38% White, 0.47% African American, 0.16% from other races, and 2.99% from two or more races. Hispanic or Latino of any race were 1.89% of the population.

There were 325 households, out of which 24.9% had children under the age of 18 living with them, 64.92% were married couples living together, 4.92% had a female householder with no husband present, and 27.08% were non-families. 24.92% of all households were made up of individuals, and 16.92% had someone living alone who was 65 years of age or older. The average household size was 2.91 and the average family size was 2.43.

The village's age distribution consisted of 23.1% under the age of 18, 4.4% from 18 to 24, 16.9% from 25 to 44, 38.5% from 45 to 64, and 17.2% who were 65 years of age or older. The median age was 48.2 years. For every 100 females, there were 90.1 males. For every 100 females age 18 and over, there were 87.9 males.

The median income for a household in the village was $82,361, and the median income for a family was $101,563. Males had a median income of $63,000 versus $48,750 for females. The per capita income for the village was $42,470. No families and 4.2% of the population were below the poverty line, including none of those under age 18 and 22.8% of those age 65 or over.

== Education ==
- Central Community High School - Formed as a consolidation of the Breese and Aviston high schools in 1971
