= Westwood, Missouri =

- Village
- Location of Westwood, Missouri
- Coordinates: 38°38′37″N 90°26′01″W
- Country: United States
- State: Missouri
- County: St. Louis
- Township: Missouri River

Area
  - Total: 0.63 sq mi (1.63 km^{2})
  - Land: 0.63 sq mi (1.63 km^{2})
  - Water: 0 sq mi (0.00 km^{2})
- Elevation: 587 ft (179 m)

Population (2020)
  - Total: 316
  - Density: 502.6/sq mi (194.06/km^{2})
- Time zone: UTC-6 (Central (CST))
  - Summer (DST): UTC-5 (CDT)
- ZIP code: 63131
- Area code(s): 314/557
- FIPS code: 29-79054
- GNIS feature ID: 2400158
- Website: villageofwestwood.org

Westwood is a village in Missouri River Township, St. Louis County, Missouri, United States. The population was 316 at the 2020 census.

== Geography ==
According to the United States Census Bureau, the village has a total area of 0.63 square miles (1.63 km^{2}), all land.

== Demographics ==
Historical population
Census	Pop.	Note	%±
1960	291		—
1970	311		6.9%
1980	335		7.7%
1990	309		−7.8%
2000	284		−8.1%
2010	278		−2.1%
2020	316		13.7%
U.S. Decennial Census

=== 2020 census ===
Westwood village, Missouri – Racial and ethnic composition Note: the US Census treats Hispanic/Latino as an ethnic category. This table excludes Latinos from the racial categories and assigns them to a separate category. Hispanics/Latinos may be of any race.
Race / Ethnicity (NH = Non-Hispanic)	Pop 2000	Pop 2010	Pop 2020	% 2000	% 2010	% 2020
White alone (NH)	272	252	247	95.77%	90.65%	78.16%
Black or African American alone (NH)	9	6	10	3.17%	2.16%	3.16%
Native American or Alaska Native alone (NH)	0	0	0	0.00%	0.00%	0.00%
Asian alone (NH)	3	10	34	1.06%	3.60%	10.76%
Native Hawaiian or Pacific Islander alone (NH)	0	0	0	0.00%	0.00%	0.00%
Other race alone (NH)	0	0	0	0.00%	0.00%	0.00%
Mixed race or Multiracial (NH)	0	4	9	0.00%	1.44%	2.85%
Hispanic or Latino (any race)	0	6	16	0.00%	2.16%	5.06%
Total	284	278	316	100.00%	100.00%	100.00%

As of the 2020 census there were 316 people and 116 households living in the village. The racial makeup of the village was 80.7% White, 3.2% African American, 10.8% Asian, 0.3% from other races, and 4.7% from two or more races. Hispanic or Latino of any race were 5.1% of the population.

=== 2010 census ===
At the 2010 census there were 278 people, 120 households, and 88 families living in the village. The population density was 455.7 inhabitants per square mile (175.9/km^{2}). There were 125 housing units at an average density of 204.9 per square mile (79.1/km^{2}). The racial makeup of the village was 92.1% White, 2.2% African American, 3.6% Asian, 0.7% from other races, and 1.4% from two or more races. Hispanic or Latino of any race were 2.2%.

Of the 120 households 23.3% had children under the age of 18 living with them, 67.5% were married couples living together, 3.3% had a female householder with no husband present, 2.5% had a male householder with no wife present, and 26.7% were non-families. 21.7% of households were one person and 12.5% were one person aged 65 or older. The average household size was 2.32 and the average family size was 2.66.

The median age in the village was 53.9 years. 16.5% of residents were under the age of 18; 5.1% were between the ages of 18 and 24; 12.9% were from 25 to 44; 38.8% were from 45 to 64; and 26.6% were 65 or older. The gender makeup of the village was 47.5% male and 52.5% female.

=== 2000 census ===
At the 2000 census there were 284 people, 120 households, and 93 families living in the village. The population density was 453.7 inhabitants per square mile (175.2/km^{2}). There were 128 housing units at an average density of 204.5 per square mile (79.0/km^{2}). The racial makeup of the village was 95.77% White, 3.17% African American and 1.06% Asian. Of the 120 households 28.3% had children under the age of 18 living with them, 75.0% were married couples living together, 0.8% had a female householder with no husband present, and 22.5% were non-families. 20.0% of households were one person and 14.2% were one person aged 65 or older. The average household size was 2.37 and the average family size was 2.72.

The age distribution was 21.1% under the age of 18, 1.1% from 18 to 24, 17.6% from 25 to 44, 36.3% from 45 to 64, and 23.9% 65 or older. The median age was 50 years. For every 100 females, there were 101.4 males. For every 100 females age 18 and over, there were 86.7 males.

The median household income was $119,618 and the median family income was $144,381. Males had a median income of $100,000 versus $32,250 for females. The per capita income for the village was $80,990. None of the families and 0.7% of the population were living below the poverty line, including no one under 18 and 2.1% of those over 64.
