= Pine Lawn, Missouri =

- City
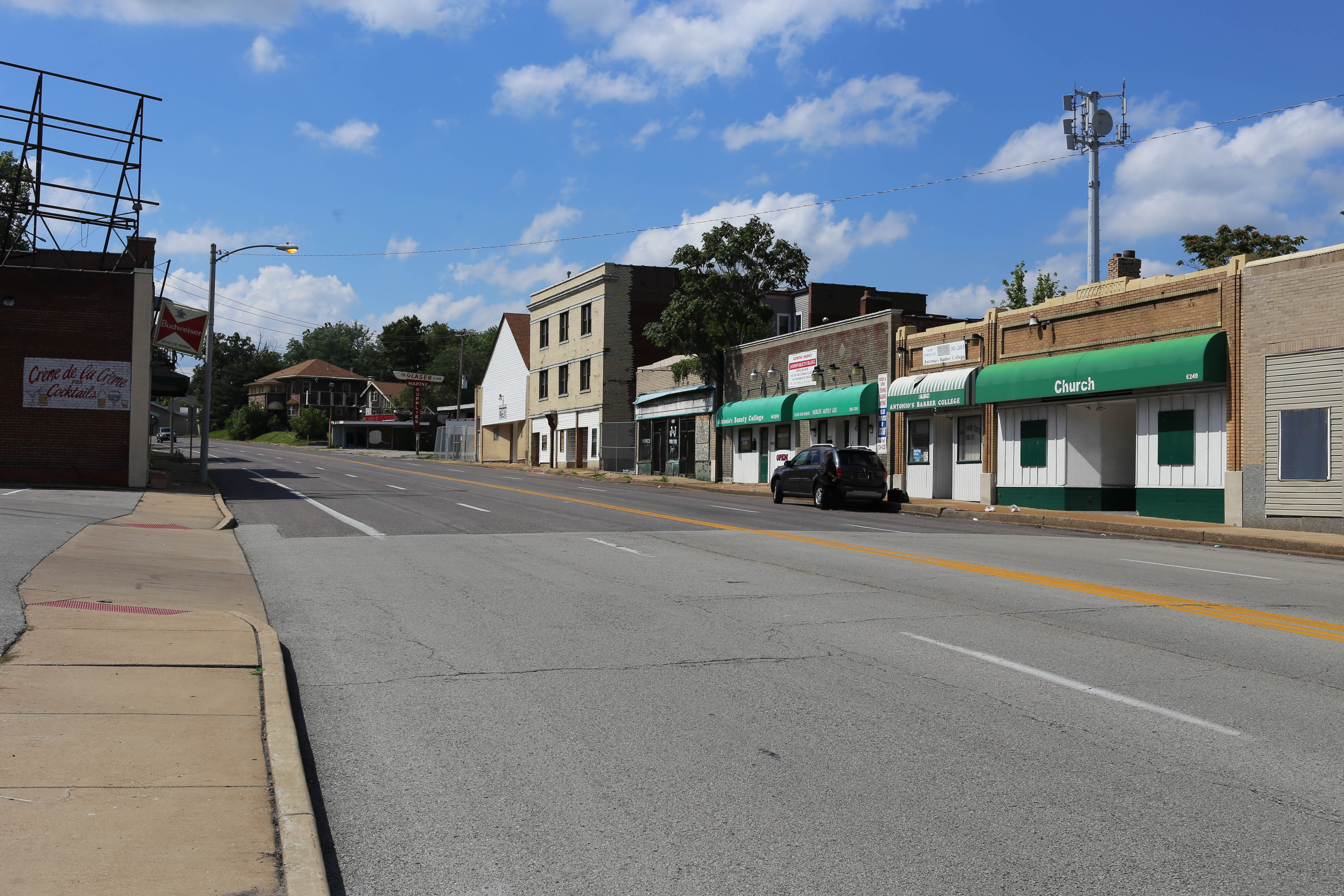
- Natural Bridge in Pine Lawn, July 2016

- Location of Pine Lawn, Missouri
- Coordinates: 38°41′43″N 90°16′32″W
- Country: United States
- State: Missouri
- County: St. Louis

Government
  - Mayor: Terry Epps

Area
  - Total: 0.62 sq mi (1.60 km^{2})
  - Land: 0.62 sq mi (1.60 km^{2})
  - Water: 0 sq mi (0.00 km^{2})
- Elevation: 604 ft (184 m)

Population (2020)
  - Total: 2,754
  - Density: 4,447.9/sq mi (1,717.36/km^{2})
- Time zone: UTC-6 (Central (CST))
  - Summer (DST): UTC-5 (CDT)
- FIPS code: 29-57800
- GNIS feature ID: 2396209
- Website: pinelawn.org

Pine Lawn is a city in St. Louis County, Missouri, United States. As of the 2020 census, Pine Lawn had a population of 2,754.

== Geography ==
According to the United States Census Bureau, the city has a total area of 0.61 square miles (1.58 km^{2}), all land.

== Demographics ==
Historical population
Census	Pop.	Note	%±
1950	6,425		—
1960	5,943		−7.5%
1970	5,745		−3.3%
1980	6,570		14.4%
1990	5,092		−22.5%
2000	4,204		−17.4%
2010	3,275		−22.1%
2020	2,754		−15.9%
U.S. Decennial Census

=== Racial and ethnic composition ===
Pine Lawn, Missouri – Racial and ethnic composition Note: the US Census treats Hispanic/Latino as an ethnic category. This table excludes Latinos from the racial categories and assigns them to a separate category. Hispanics/Latinos may be of any race.
Race / Ethnicity (NH = Non-Hispanic)	Pop 2000	Pop 2010	Pop 2020	% 2000	% 2010	% 2020
White alone (NH)	99	41	44	2.35%	1.25%	1.60%
Black or African American alone (NH)	4,023	3,139	2,600	95.69%	95.85%	94.41%
Native American or Alaska Native alone (NH)	4	10	0	0.10%	0.31%	0.00%
Asian alone (NH)	3	3	2	0.07%	0.09%	0.07%
Native Hawaiian or Pacific Islander alone (NH)	0	0	2	0.00%	0.00%	0.07%
Other race alone (NH)	16	2	27	0.38%	0.06%	0.98%
Mixed race or Multiracial (NH)	43	40	71	1.02%	1.22%	2.58%
Hispanic or Latino (any race)	16	40	8	0.38%	1.22%	0.29%
Total	4,204	3,275	2,754	100.00%	100.00%	100.00%

=== 2020 census ===
As of the 2020 census, Pine Lawn had a population of 2,754. The median age was 39.0 years. 26.5% of residents were under the age of 18 and 17.2% of residents were 65 years of age or older. For every 100 females there were 80.7 males, and for every 100 females age 18 and over there were 77.5 males age 18 and over.

100.0% of residents lived in urban areas, while 0.0% lived in rural areas.

There were 1,158 households in Pine Lawn, of which 31.6% had children under the age of 18 living in them. Of all households, 13.3% were married-couple households, 24.2% were households with a male householder and no spouse or partner present, and 57.2% were households with a female householder and no spouse or partner present. About 38.1% of all households were made up of individuals and 17.2% had someone living alone who was 65 years of age or older.

There were 1,607 housing units, of which 27.9% were vacant. The homeowner vacancy rate was 5.4% and the rental vacancy rate was 18.7%.

=== 2010 census ===
As of the census of 2010, there were 3,275 people, 1,189 households, and 834 families living in the city. The population density was 5,368.9 inhabitants per square mile (2,072.9/km^{2}). There were 1,606 housing units at an average density of 2,632.8 per square mile (1,016.5/km^{2}). The racial makeup of the city was 1.5% White, 96.4% African American, 0.3% Native American, 0.1% Asian, 0.2% from other races, and 1.4% from two or more races. Hispanic or Latino of any race were 1.2% of the population.

There were 1,189 households, of which 41.3% had children under the age of 18 living with them, 17.7% were married couples living together, 44.9% had a female householder with no husband present, 7.5% had a male householder with no wife present, and 29.9% were non-families. 26.8% of all households were made up of individuals, and 9.2% had someone living alone who was 65 years of age or older. The average household size was 2.75 and the average family size was 3.31.

The median age in the city was 31.8 years. 31.1% of residents were under the age of 18; 9.8% were between the ages of 18 and 24; 24.8% were from 25 to 44; 22.3% were from 45 to 64; and 11.9% were 65 years of age or older. The gender makeup of the city was 44.7% male and 55.3% female.

=== 2000 census ===
As of the census of 2000, there were 4,204 people, 1,469 households, and 1,066 families living in the city. The population density was 6,942.5 inhabitants per square mile (2,680.5/km^{2}). There were 1,709 housing units at an average density of 2,822.2 per square mile (1,089.7/km^{2}). The racial makeup of the city was 2.35% White, 95.96% African American, 0.12% Native American, 0.07% Asian, 0.40% from other races, and 1.09% from two or more races. Hispanic or Latino of any race were 0.38% of the population.

There were 1,469 households, out of which 34.6% had children under the age of 18 living with them, 24.0% were married couples living together, 42.1% had a female householder with no husband present, and 27.4% were non-families. 23.2% of all households were made up of individuals, and 7.3% had someone living alone who was 65 years of age or older. The average household size was 2.86 and the average family size was 3.38.

In the city, the population was spread out, with 33.6% under the age of 18, 9.6% from 18 to 24, 26.6% from 25 to 44, 19.9% from 45 to 64, and 10.3% who were 65 years of age or older. The median age was 30 years. For every 100 females, there were 79.8 males. For every 100 females age 18 and over, there were 71.2 males.

The median income for a household in the city was $21,500, and the median income for a family was $23,217. Males had a median income of $23,542 versus $22,399 for females. The per capita income for the city was $11,908. About 34.3% of families and 36.9% of the population were below the poverty line, including 54.5% of those under age 18 and 16.3% of those age 65 or over.

== Police and Municipal Courts Controversy ==
Pine Lawn police issued some 17,000 traffic violations during 2014, in a town with about 2,300 adults, and has about 30,000 open warrants. For the fiscal year ending June 30, 2014, Pine Lawn collected general revenue in the amount of $3,532,167, out of which $2,237,196 derived from fine and fees from its municipal court. This amounts to 63% of its general revenue and based on the 2010 Census, equates to $683.11 for each of its 3,275 residents. The local prosecutor was criticized for this, because he is a lawyer for the Michael Brown family, and alleges overzealous enforcement by the Ferguson Police Department.

The report of the US Attorney General concerning the Ferguson Police Department prompted protests in Pine Lawn, Missouri as well. The use of police departments as revenue generation units may be widespread.

In October 2016, a former Pine Lawn police lieutenant, Steve Blakeney, was sentenced to 51 months in prison after being convicted of trumping up charges to arrest a challenger to then incumbent mayor Sylvester Caldwell. The officer coerced two store owners to falsely testify that the candidate had stolen a Caldwell campaign poster, then used that testimony In December 2017, the United States Court of Appeals for the Eighth Circuit upheld the conviction. Caldwell was himself convicted and sentenced to prison for extortion in 2015.

== Education ==
It is in the Normandy Schools Collaborative school district (formerly Normandy School District).

Barack Obama School is in Pine Lawn. It is a consolidation of Garfield Elementary School and Pine Lawn Elementary School. In 2010 all of the members of the board of trustees voted to name the school after then-President of the United States Barack Obama. Cozy Marks, the president of the board of trustees, believed that African-American children would identify with what Obama did. Students at Garfield and Pine Lawn schools selected Obama's name in a poll for the name of the consolidated school. The area of the building is 65,000 square feet (6,000 m^{2}). The school began operations in 2011.

The former Garfield School had a Northwoods postal address, but was in Pine Lawn. Pine Lawn Elementary was also in Pine Lawn.

The comprehensive high school of the district is Normandy High School.
