= Santa Fe Township, Clinton County, Illinois =

Santa Fe Township
- Township
- Location in Clinton County

- Clinton County's location in Illinois
- Coordinates: 38°32′30″N 89°25′30″W
- Country: United States
- State: Illinois
- County: Clinton

Area
  - Total: 25.64 sq mi (66.4 km^{2})
  - Land: 25.48 sq mi (66.0 km^{2})
  - Water: 0.16 sq mi (0.41 km^{2}) 0.62%
- Elevation: 446 ft (136 m)

Population (2020)
  - Total: 1,195
  - Density: 46.90/sq mi (18.11/km^{2})
- Time zone: UTC-6 (CST)
  - Summer (DST): UTC-5 (CDT)
- ZIP codes: 62218, 62231, 62271
- FIPS code: 17-027-67652

Santa Fe Township is one of fifteen townships in Clinton County, Illinois, USA. As of the 2020 census, its population was 1,195 and it contained 510 housing units. The township was formed from part of Germantown and Carlyle townships.

== Geography ==
According to the 2010 census, the township has a total area of 25.64 square miles (66.4 km^{2}), of which 25.48 square miles (66.0 km^{2}) (or 99.38%) is land and 0.16 square miles (0.41 km^{2}) (or 0.62%) is water.

=== Cities, towns, villages ===
- Bartelso

=== Cemeteries ===
The township contains these six cemeteries: Ira Maddux, Johnson, Locey, Old Nichols on the Ridge, Saint Cecelia and Sharp.

=== Major highways ===
- Illinois Route 161

=== Lakes ===
- Big Flat Lake
- Cow Lake
- Goose Lake
- Hog Lake
- Horseshoe Lake
- Little Swan Lake
- Little Flat Lake
- Long Lake
- Savage Lake
- Townsend Lake
- Wildcat Lake

=== Landmarks ===
- Royal Lake Resort (southwest half)

== Demographics ==
As of the 2020 census there were 1,195 people, 512 households, and 359 families residing in the township. The population density was 46.53 inhabitants per square mile (17.97/km^{2}). There were 510 housing units at an average density of 19.86 per square mile (7.67/km^{2}). The racial makeup of the township was 95.48% White, 1.59% African American, 0.00% Native American, 0.00% Asian, 0.00% Pacific Islander, 0.08% from other races, and 2.85% from two or more races. Hispanic or Latino of any race were 1.26% of the population.

There were 512 households, out of which 27.30% had children under the age of 18 living with them, 62.70% were married couples living together, 4.10% had a female householder with no spouse present, and 29.88% were non-families. 26.00% of all households were made up of individuals, and 18.00% had someone living alone who was 65 years of age or older. The average household size was 2.54 and the average family size was 3.09.

The township's age distribution consisted of 23.8% under the age of 18, 4.8% from 18 to 24, 19% from 25 to 44, 37.1% from 45 to 64, and 15.3% who were 65 years of age or older. The median age was 47.4 years. For every 100 females, there were 87.9 males. For every 100 females age 18 and over, there were 87.5 males.

The median income for a household in the township was $81,389, and the median income for a family was $107,841. Males had a median income of $66,667 versus $38,750 for females. The per capita income for the township was $41,417. No of families and 4.3% of the population were below the poverty line, including none of those under age 18 and 19.6% of those age 65 or over.

Historical population
| Census | Pop. | Note | %± |
|---|---|---|---|
| 2010 | 1,136 | | — |
| 2020 | 1,195 | | 5.2% |
U.S. Decennial Census

== School districts ==
- Carlyle Community Unit School District 1
- Central Community High School District
- Bartelso Elementary School District

== Political districts ==
- Illinois' 19th congressional district
- State House District 107
- State Senate District 54
