= Soft Surroundings =

American women's clothing retailer

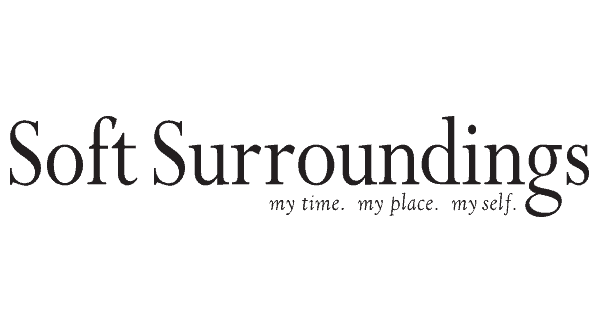
- Company type: Women's clothing store
- Industry: Retail
- Founded: July 18, 1999; 26 years ago, St. Louis, Missouri
- Headquarters: St. Louis, Missouri, U.S.
- Products: Women's clothing; bedding
- Owner: Independent; (1999-2012); Brentwood Associates (2012-23); Coldwater Creek; (2023-present)
- Website: www.softsurroundings.com

Soft Surroundings is an American catalog chain specializing in women's clothing and bedding products. Based in St. Louis, Missouri, it currently operates as an online-only retailer.

== History ==
Founded in 1999, Soft Surroundings began as a catalog mailing service company in St. Louis, Missouri.

In 2005, the firm began expanding its retail footprint, by opening its first and flagship store in its home in St. Louis. Upon being acquired on August 14, 2012 by Brentwood Associates, it had plans to expand its mailing service and expand its retail footprint over the next many years.

On March 18, 2016, it revealed its plans for its retail footprint and announced that it would open more than 20+ stores over the rest of 2016, which would bring its total amount of stores from 29 to around 50 stores by 2017, with the 50th store being located in Omaha, Nebraska. Plans call for nine more stores to open by the end of 2017.

Soft Surroundings was rapidly declining between 2022 and early 2023, forcing the company to close nearly 30 of its over 70 underperforming stores. Back in June 2022, Soft Surroundings was planning on restructuring completely and refocusing its entire assortment on Gen X women to boost sales.

=== Bankruptcy ===
On September 11, 2023, the firm filed for Chapter 11 bankruptcy. As well as being reported that its remaining 44 stores would be closed permanently, it was announced that its e-commerce business and mailing catalog service would be sold. The final stores shuttered on February 24, 2024.

On December 7, 2023, Soft Surroundings was sold to Coldwater Creek. Coldwater Creek, which had filed a Chapter 11 bankruptcy petition in 2014, was acquired by Hong Kong-based procurement, logistics and product development company, Newtimes Group, in 2020. Newtimes Group is one of the world's largest suppliers to the apparel industry.
