= Hog Lake (Florida) =

Lake in the state of Florida, United States

- Lake Granada
- Location within Florida
- Location: Highlands County, Florida
- Coordinates: 27.5306°N 81.5174°W
- Type: lake
- Surface area: 19.6-acre (79,000 m^{2})

Hog Lake is the historical name for Lake Granada, a natural freshwater lake in the Sun 'N Lake community, in Highlands County, Florida. Lake Granada has a surface area of 19.6-acre (79,000 m^{2}). About 1-acre (4,000 m^{2}) of this is a manmade island inside the lake. The lake is directly north of the Sun 'N Lake community center and is inside a park. The country club restaurant is directly north of the lake.

The island inside Lake Granada contains a picnic pavilion and may be reached by a wooden footbridge. Swimming and boating are not allowed on Lake Granada. Fishing is allowed from the bridge.
