= Flordell Hills, Missouri =

- City
- Location of Flordell Hills, Missouri
- Coordinates: 38°43′3″N 90°15′53″W
- Country: United States
- State: Missouri
- County: St. Louis
- Township: Normandy

Area
  - Total: 0.12 sq mi (0.32 km^{2})
  - Land: 0.12 sq mi (0.32 km^{2})
  - Water: 0 sq mi (0.00 km^{2})
- Elevation: 522 ft (159 m)

Population (2020)
  - Total: 724
  - Density: 5,907.1/sq mi (2,280.75/km^{2})
- Time zone: UTC-6 (Central (CST))
  - Summer (DST): UTC-5 (CDT)
- ZIP code: 63136
- Area code: 314
- FIPS code: 29-24706
- GNIS feature ID: 2394774
- Website: flordell.com

Flordell Hills is a city in Normandy Township, St. Louis County, Missouri, United States. The population was 724 at the 2020 census.

== Geography ==
According to the United States Census Bureau, the city has a total area of 0.11 square miles (0.28 km^{2}), all land.

== Demographics ==
Historical population
Census	Pop.	Note	%±
1950	1,214		—
1960	1,119		−7.8%
1970	989		−11.6%
1980	919		−7.1%
1990	950		3.4%
2000	931		−2.0%
2010	822		−11.7%
2020	724		−11.9%
U.S. Decennial Census

=== 2020 census ===
Flordell Hills city, Missouri – Racial and ethnic composition Note: the US Census treats Hispanic/Latino as an ethnic category. This table excludes Latinos from the racial categories and assigns them to a separate category. Hispanics/Latinos may be of any race.
Race / Ethnicity (NH = Non-Hispanic)	Pop 2000	Pop 2010	Pop 2020	% 2000	% 2010	% 2020
White alone (NH)	155	48	28	16.65%	5.84%	3.87%
Black or African American alone (NH)	764	744	659	82.06%	90.51%	91.02%
Native American or Alaska Native alone (NH)	0	2	0	0.00%	0.24%	0.00%
Asian alone (NH)	0	1	0	0.00%	0.12%	0.00%
Native Hawaiian or Pacific Islander alone (NH)	0	0	0	0.00%	0.00%	0.00%
Other Race alone (NH)	2	0	8	0.21%	0.00%	1.10%
Mixed race or Multiracial (NH)	5	13	16	0.54%	1.58%	2.21%
Hispanic or Latino (any race)	5	14	13	0.54%	1.70%	1.80%
Total	931	822	724	100.00%	100.00%	100.00%

=== 2010 census ===
At the 2010 census there were 822 people, 313 households, and 213 families living in the city. The population density was 7,472.7 inhabitants per square mile (2,885.2/km^{2}). There were 387 housing units at an average density of 3,518.2 per square mile (1,358.4/km^{2}). The racial makeup of the city was 5.8% White, 90.8% African American, 0.2% Native American, 0.1% Asian, 1.3% from other races, and 1.7% from two or more races. Hispanic or Latino of any race were 1.7%.

Of the 313 households 39.6% had children under the age of 18 living with them, 17.6% were married couples living together, 43.5% had a female householder with no husband present, 7.0% had a male householder with no wife present, and 31.9% were non-families. 26.2% of households were one person and 7.1% were one person aged 65 or older. The average household size was 2.63 and the average family size was 3.12.

The median age was 32.2 years. 27.9% of residents were under the age of 18; 12.3% were between the ages of 18 and 24; 27.4% were from 25 to 44; 24.8% were from 45 to 64; and 7.7% were 65 or older. The gender makeup of the city was 46.1% male and 53.9% female.

=== 2000 census ===
At the 2000 census there were 931 people, 367 households, and 245 families living in the city. The population density was 8,111.7 inhabitants per square mile (3,131.9/km^{2}). There were 396 housing units at an average density of 3,450.3 per square mile (1,332.2/km^{2}). The racial makeup of the city was 16.86% White, 82.06% African American, 0.21% from other races, and 0.86% from two or more races. Hispanic or Latino of any race were 0.54%.

Of the 367 households 37.9% had children under the age of 18 living with them, 26.7% were married couples living together, 35.1% had a female householder with no husband present, and 33.0% were non-families. 27.5% of households were one person and 7.9% were one person aged 65 or older. The average household size was 2.54 and the average family size was 3.10.

The age distribution was 31.0% under the age of 18, 9.2% from 18 to 24, 32.3% from 25 to 44, 19.5% from 45 to 64, and 7.8% 65 or older. The median age was 32 years. For every 100 females, there were 78.7 males. For every 100 females age 18 and over, there were 70.3 males.

The median household income was $31,875 and the median family income was $34,063. Males had a median income of $29,750 versus $23,889 for females. The per capita income for the city was $14,539. About 19.4% of families and 21.0% of the population were below the poverty line, including 30.9% of those under age 18 and 4.4% of those age 65 or over.

== Education ==
It is in the Jennings School District.
