= Gateway Packaging =

American manufacturing company

Gateway Packaging Co.
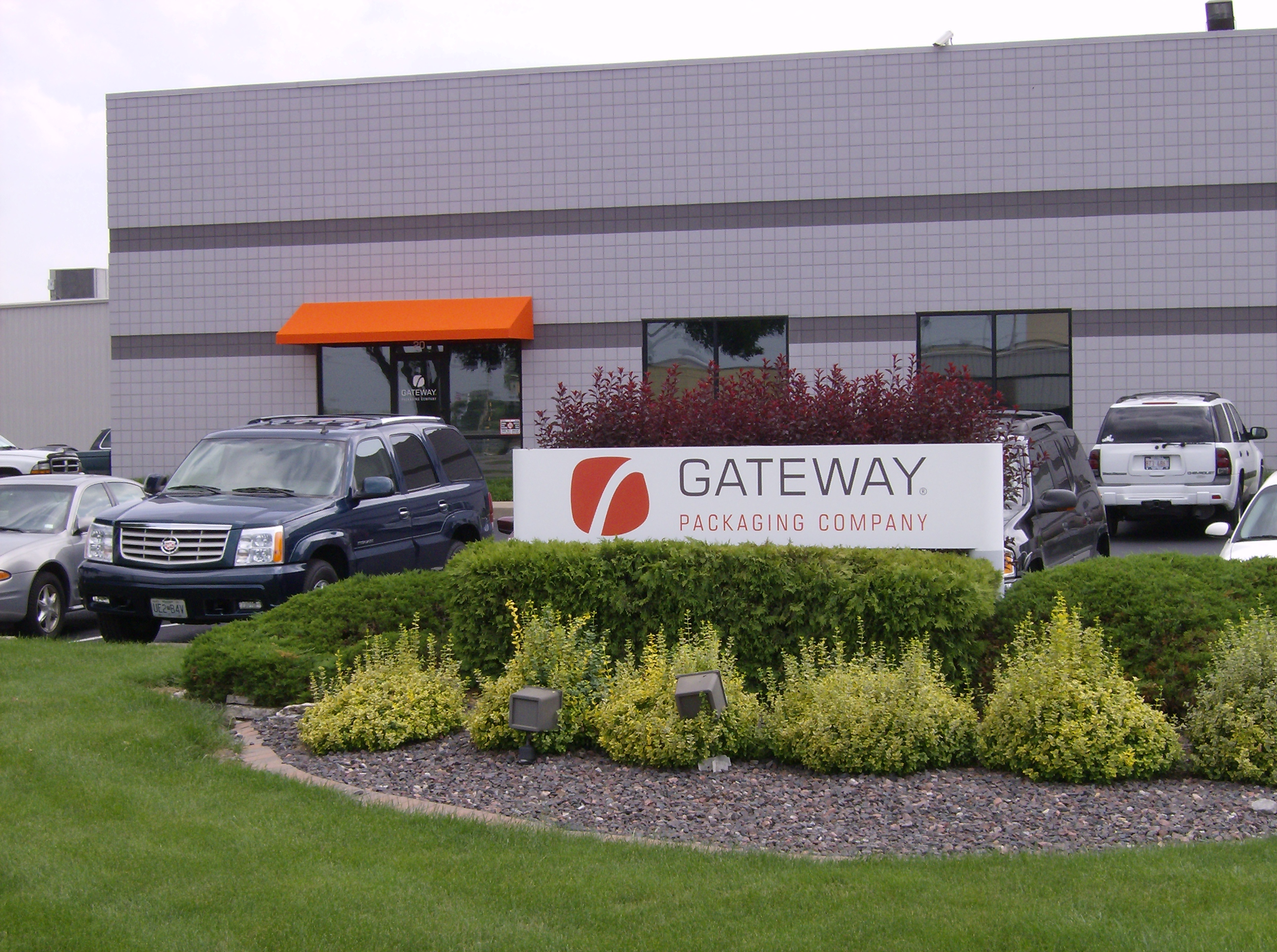
- Type: Private
- Industry: Packaging
- Founded: 1982
- Founder: Roger Miller
- Headquarters: Granite City, Illinois; Kansas City, Missouri, U.S.
- Key people: Omar Abuaita, CEO; David Antonini, CFO; Greg Chastain, VP of Sales; Bob Owen, VP of Supply Chain
- Website: www.gatewaypackaging.com

Gateway Packaging Company, LLC is an American manufacturer of flexible packaging, labels, lids, and bags. Gateway Packaging includes services for the human food, pet food, industrial, chemical and medical industries.

== History ==
Gateway Packaging Co. was founded in 1982 by Roger and Rebecca Miller from the basement of their home. Gateway Packaging's proposition was to fill market demand for flexible packaging. To accommodate growth in the packaging industry, Roger Miller invested in a 20,000-square-foot (1,900 m^{2}) building. In September 2001, Gateway purchased Percy Kent Bag Co, a Kansas City manufacturer of multi-wall bags.

On June 21, 2010, Saw Mill Capital LLC, a private equity firm, purchased 75% of Gateway Packaging, which allowed for substantial growth. On January 13, 2017, it acquired Werthan Packaging, formerly known as Werthan Industries, based in Nashville, Tennessee and founded in 1868.

Today Gateway Packaging is serving the needs of small businesses and large Fortune 500 companies such as Nestlé Purina PetCare.

== Marketing ==
The marketing slogan for Gateway Packaging is "The Most Flexible Name in Packaging."

== Awards ==
Gateway Packaging Company wins first place in Web Offset Association Print Awards for excellence.

Gateway Packaging Company wins a Gold Award for their Purina Pro Plan Shredded Blend Weight Management Formula under the category of flexible packaging. This award is sponsored by Gold Ink Awards, "The Industry's Most Prestigious Printing Competition."

== Philanthropy ==
The United Way and July 4 fireworks in Granite City, Illinois are supported by Gateway Packaging.
