= Scotsdale, Missouri =

- Village
- Location of Scotsdale, Missouri
- Coordinates: 38°23′10″N 90°35′38″W
- Country: United States
- State: Missouri
- County: Jefferson

Area
  - Total: 0.58 sq mi (1.50 km^{2})
  - Land: 0.58 sq mi (1.50 km^{2})
  - Water: 0 sq mi (0.00 km^{2})
- Elevation: 581 ft (177 m)

Population (2020)
  - Total: 194
  - Density: 334.5/sq mi (129.15/km^{2})
- Time zone: UTC-6 (Central (CST))
  - Summer (DST): UTC-5 (CDT)
- FIPS code: 29-66337
- GNIS feature ID: 2396909

Scotsdale is a village in Jefferson County, Missouri, United States. The population was 222 at the 2010 census.

== Geography ==
Scotsdale is located at 38°24′4″N 90°35′18″W (38.401092, -90.588374). According to the United States Census Bureau, the village has a total area of 0.74 square miles (1.92 km^{2}), all land.

== Demographics ==
Historical population
Census	Pop.	Note	%±
1980	183		—
1990	193		5.5%
2000	211		9.3%
2010	222		5.2%
2020	194		−12.6%
U.S. Decennial Census

=== 2010 census ===
As of the census of 2010, there were 222 people, 81 households, and 63 families living in the village. The population density was 300.0 inhabitants per square mile (115.8/km^{2}). There were 85 housing units at an average density of 114.9 per square mile (44.4/km^{2}). The racial makeup of the village was 99.5% White and 0.5% from two or more races. Hispanic or Latino of any race were 0.5% of the population.

There were 81 households, of which 38.3% had children under the age of 18 living with them, 65.4% were married couples living together, 11.1% had a female householder with no husband present, 1.2% had a male householder with no wife present, and 22.2% were non-families. 17.3% of all households were made up of individuals, and 2.5% had someone living alone who was 65 years of age or older. The average household size was 2.74 and the average family size was 3.11.

The median age in the village was 42.5 years. 22.1% of residents were under the age of 18; 10.8% were between the ages of 18 and 24; 20.8% were from 25 to 44; 34.3% were from 45 to 64; and 12.2% were 65 years of age or older. The gender makeup of the village was 50.9% male and 49.1% female.

=== 2000 census ===
As of the census of 2000, there were 211 people, 66 households, and 59 families living in the town. The population density was 262.4 inhabitants per square mile (101.3/km^{2}). There were 68 housing units at an average density of 84.6 per square mile (32.7/km^{2}). The racial makeup of the town was 98.58% White, 0.47% African American, 0.47% Asian, and 0.47% from two or more races.

There were 66 households, out of which 47.0% had children under the age of 18 living with them, 71.2% were married couples living together, 13.6% had a female householder with no husband present, and 10.6% were non-families. 7.6% of all households were made up of individuals, and none had someone living alone who was 65 years of age or older. The average household size was 3.20 and the average family size was 3.29.

In the town the population was spread out, with 34.1% under the age of 18, 7.1% from 18 to 24, 27.0% from 25 to 44, 26.1% from 45 to 64, and 5.7% who were 65 years of age or older. The median age was 36 years. For every 100 females, there were 99.1 males. For every 100 females age 18 and over, there were 90.4 males.

The median income for a household in the town was $53,750, and the median income for a family was $51,250. Males had a median income of $40,625 versus $25,417 for females. The per capita income for the town was $16,304. About 7.1% of families and 14.0% of the population were below the poverty line, including 20.2% of those under the age of eighteen and none of those 65 or over.
