= Lake Tekakwitha, Missouri =

- Village
- Location in Missouri Lake Tekakwitha, Missouri (the United States)
- Coordinates: 38°26′29″N 90°42′55″W
- Country: United States
- State: Missouri
- County: Jefferson
- Incorporated: June 17, 2009

Area
  - Total: 0.22 sq mi (0.57 km^{2})
  - Land: 0.20 sq mi (0.52 km^{2})
  - Water: 0.019 sq mi (0.05 km^{2})
- Elevation: 538 ft (164 m)

Population (2020)
  - Total: 230
  - Density: 1,150.9/sq mi (444.35/km^{2})
- Time zone: UTC-6 (Central (CST))
  - Summer (DST): UTC-5 (CDT)
- ZIP code: 63069
- Area code: 636
- FIPS code: 29-40214
- GNIS feature ID: 2585135

Lake Tekakwitha is a village in Jefferson County, Missouri, United States. As of the 2020 census, Lake Tekakwitha had a population of 230.

== Geography ==
According to the United States Census Bureau, the village has a total area of 0.283 square miles (0.73 km^{2}), of which 0.262 square miles (0.68 km^{2}) are land and 0.021 square miles (0.05 km^{2}) are water.

== Demographics ==
Historical population
Census	Pop.	Note	%±
2010	254		—
2020	230		−9.4%
U.S. Decennial Census

As of the census of 2010, there were 254 people, 115 households, and 60 families residing in the village. The population density was 897.5 inhabitants per square mile (346.5/km^{2}) There were 136 housing units at an average density of 480.6 per square mile (185.6/km^{2}). The racial makeup of the village was 97.2% White, 0.0% Native American, 1.2% Asian, and 1.6% from two or more races. Hispanic or Latino of any race were 0.4% of the population.

== Education ==
It is in the Meramec Valley School District.
