= Country Club Hills, Missouri =

City in St. Louis County, Missouri, United States

- City
- Logo

- Location of Country Club Hills, Missouri
- Coordinates: 38°43′15″N 90°16′30″W
- Country: United States
- State: Missouri
- County: St. Louis
- Township: Normandy
- Incorporated: 1943

Government
  - Mayor: Bender McKinney, Jr.

Area
  - Total: 0.19 sq mi (0.48 km^{2})
  - Land: 0.19 sq mi (0.48 km^{2})
  - Water: 0 sq mi (0.00 km^{2})
- Elevation: 538 ft (164 m)

Population (2020)
  - Total: 1,014
  - Density: 5,438.1/sq mi (2,099.65/km^{2})
- Time zone: UTC-6 (Central (CST))
  - Summer (DST): UTC-5 (CDT)
- ZIP code: 63136
- Area code: 314
- FIPS code: 29-16822
- GNIS feature ID: 2393652
- Website: countryclubhills.us

Country Club Hills is a city in Normandy Township, St. Louis County, Missouri, United States. The population was 1,014 at the 2020 census.

== History ==
Country Club Hills was incorporated in 1943.

== Geography ==
According to the United States Census Bureau, the city has a total area of 0.18 square miles (0.47 km^{2}), all land.

== Demographics ==
=== 2020 census ===
Country Club Hills, Missouri – Racial and ethnic composition Note: the US Census treats Hispanic/Latino as an ethnic category. This table excludes Latinos from the racial categories and assigns them to a separate category. Hispanics/Latinos may be of any race.
Race / Ethnicity (NH = Non-Hispanic)	Pop 2000	Pop 2010	Pop 2020	% 2000	% 2010	% 2020
White alone (NH)	230	103	62	16.65%	8.08%	6.11%
Black or African American alone (NH)	1,116	1,158	917	80.81%	90.89%	90.43%
Native American or Alaska Native alone (NH)	3	2	0	0.22%	0.16%	0.00%
Asian alone (NH)	1	0	1	0.07%	0.00%	0.10%
Native Hawaiian or Pacific Islander alone (NH)	0	0	0	0.00%	0.00%	0.00%
Other race alone (NH)	1	0	1	0.07%	0.00%	0.10%
Mixed race or Multiracial (NH)	19	9	24	1.38%	0.71%	2.37%
Hispanic or Latino (any race)	11	2	9	0.80%	0.16%	0.89%
Total	1,381	1,274	1,014	100.00%	100.00%	100.00%

Historical population
Census	Pop.	Note	%±
1950	1,731		—
1960	1,763		1.8%
1970	1,644		−6.7%
1980	1,315		−20.0%
1990	1,316		0.1%
2000	1,381		4.9%
2010	1,274		−7.7%
2020	1,014		−20.4%
U.S. Decennial Census

=== 2010 census ===
As of the census of 2010, there were 1,274 people, 462 households, and 343 families living in the city. The population density was 7,077.8 inhabitants per square mile (2,732.8/km^{2}). There were 534 housing units at an average density of 2,966.7 per square mile (1,145.4/km^{2}). The racial makeup of the city was 8.2% White, 90.9% African American, 0.2% Native American, 0.1% from other races, and 0.7% from two or more races. Hispanic or Latino of any race were 0.2% of the population.

There were 462 households, of which 45.0% had children under the age of 18 living with them, 23.8% were married couples living together, 44.2% had a female householder with no husband present, 6.3% had a male householder with no wife present, and 25.8% were non-families. 22.5% of all households were made up of individuals, and 6.1% had someone living alone who was 65 years of age or older. The average household size was 2.76 and the average family size was 3.18.

The median age in the city was 31.4 years. 30.5% of residents were under the age of 18; 10.9% were between the ages of 18 and 24; 26.4% were from 25 to 44; 24.5% were from 45 to 64; and 7.6% were 65 years of age or older. The gender makeup of the city was 44.3% male and 55.7% female.

=== 2000 census ===
As of the census of 2000, there were 1,381 people, 515 households, and 373 families living in the city. The population density was 7,761.7 inhabitants per square mile (2,996.8/km^{2}). There were 557 housing units at an average density of 3,130.5 per square mile (1,208.7/km^{2}). The racial makeup of the city was 17.16% White, 80.96% African American, 0.22% Native American, 0.07% Asian, 0.07% from other races, and 1.52% from two or more races. Hispanic or Latino of any race were 0.80% of the population.

There were 515 households, out of which 39.6% had children under the age of 18 living with them, 28.5% were married couples living together, 38.3% had a female householder with no husband present, and 27.4% were non-families. 22.7% of all households were made up of individuals, and 7.8% had someone living alone who was 65 years of age or older. The average household size was 2.68 and the average family size was 3.09.

In the city, the population was spread out, with 32.3% under the age of 18, 8.4% from 18 to 24, 32.4% from 25 to 44, 18.5% from 45 to 64, and 8.5% who were 65 years of age or older. The median age was 31 years. For every 100 females, there were 79.4 males. For every 100 females age 18 and over, there were 70.0 males.

The median income for a household in the city was $27,955, and the median income for a family was $31,845. Males had a median income of $26,938 versus $22,727 for females. The per capita income for the city was $15,374. About 14.1% of families and 14.7% of the population were below the poverty line, including 19.3% of those under age 18 and 12.4% of those age 65 or over.

== Education ==
It is in the Jennings School District.

== See also ==
- List of cities in Missouri
