= Cedar Hill Lakes, Missouri =

- Village
- Location of Cedar Hill Lakes, Missouri
- Coordinates: 38°19′48″N 90°39′28″W
- Country: United States
- State: Missouri
- County: Jefferson

Area
  - Total: 0.25 sq mi (0.65 km^{2})
  - Land: 0.22 sq mi (0.56 km^{2})
  - Water: 0.035 sq mi (0.09 km^{2})
- Elevation: 630 ft (190 m)

Population (2020)
  - Total: 203
  - Density: 934.4/sq mi (360.78/km^{2})
- Time zone: UTC-6 (Central (CST))
  - Summer (DST): UTC-5 (CDT)
- FIPS code: 29-12376
- GNIS feature ID: 2397581

Cedar Hill Lakes is a village in Jefferson County, Missouri, United States. The population was 203 at the 2020 census.

== Geography ==
According to the United States Census Bureau, the village has a total area of 0.26 square miles (0.67 km^{2}), of which 0.23 square miles (0.60 km^{2}) is land and 0.03 square miles (0.08 km^{2}) is water.

== Demographics ==
Historical population
Census	Pop.	Note	%±
1980	200		—
1990	227		13.5%
2000	229		0.9%
2010	237		3.5%
2020	203		−14.3%
U.S. Decennial Census

=== 2010 census ===
As of the census of 2010, there were 237 people, 101 households, and 62 families living in the village. The population density was 1,030.4 inhabitants per square mile (397.8/km^{2}). There were 120 housing units at an average density of 521.7 per square mile (201.4/km^{2}). The racial makeup of the village was 97.5% White, 0.4% Native American, 1.3% Asian, and 0.8% from two or more races. Hispanic or Latino of any race were 1.3% of the population.

There were 101 households, of which 24.8% had children under the age of 18 living with them, 46.5% were married couples living together, 8.9% had a female householder with no husband present, 5.9% had a male householder with no wife present, and 38.6% were non-families. 30.7% of all households were made up of individuals, and 8% had someone living alone who was 65 years of age or older. The average household size was 2.35 and the average family size was 2.92.

The median age in the village was 43.7 years. 17.3% of residents were under the age of 18; 12.3% were between the ages of 18 and 24; 22.8% were from 25 to 44; 38.4% were from 45 to 64; and 9.3% were 65 years of age or older. The gender makeup of the village was 48.5% male and 51.5% female.

=== 2000 census ===
As of the census of 2000, there were 229 people, 82 households, and 61 families living in the village. The population density was 921.4 inhabitants per square mile (355.8/km^{2}). There were 95 housing units at an average density of 382.2 per square mile (147.6/km^{2}). The racial makeup of the village was 97.82% White, 0.44% Native American, 0.87% from other races, and 0.87% from two or more races. Hispanic or Latino of any race were 0.87% of the population.

There were 82 households, out of which 36.6% had children under the age of 18 living with them, 58.5% were married couples living together, 9.8% had a female householder with no husband present, and 25.6% were non-families. 20.7% of all households were made up of individuals, and 3.7% had someone living alone who was 65 years of age or older. The average household size was 2.79 and the average family size was 3.33.

In the village, the population was spread out, with 30.1% under the age of 18, 7.0% from 18 to 24, 32.3% from 25 to 44, 23.1% from 45 to 64, and 7.4% who were 65 years of age or older. The median age was 37 years. For every 100 females, there were 100.9 males. For every 100 females age 18 and over, there were 102.5 males.

The median income for a household in the village was $54,375, and the median income for a family was $58,750. Males had a median income of $36,964 versus $30,000 for females. The per capita income for the village was $20,222. About 3.7% of families and 5.6% of the population were below the poverty line, including 3.3% of those under the age of eighteen and 16.7% of those 65 or over.
