= Peaceful Village, Missouri =

- Village
- Location within Missouri
- Coordinates: 38°28′01″N 90°32′34″W
- Country: United States
- State: Missouri
- County: Jefferson
- Incorporated: September 9, 2008

Area
  - Total: 0.20 sq mi (0.51 km^{2})
  - Land: 0.20 sq mi (0.51 km^{2})
  - Water: 0 sq mi (0.00 km^{2})
- Elevation: 860 ft (260 m)

Population (2020)
  - Total: 95
  - Density: 484.6/sq mi (187.09/km^{2})
- Time zone: UTC-6 (Central (CST))
  - Summer (DST): UTC-5 (CDT)
- ZIP code: 63049
- Area code: 636
- FIPS code: 29-56620
- GNIS feature ID: 2585133

Peaceful Village (also known as Peaceful) is a village in Jefferson County, Missouri, United States. As of the 2020 census, Peaceful Village had a population of 95.

== Geography ==
According to the United States Census Bureau, the village has a total area of 0.17 square miles (0.44 km^{2}), all land.

== Demographics ==
Historical population
Census	Pop.	Note	%±
2010	9		—
2020	95		955.6%
U.S. Decennial Census

=== 2010 census ===
As of the census of 2010, there were 9 people, 4 households, and 3 families residing in the village. The population density was 52.9 inhabitants per square mile (20.4/km^{2}). There were 4 housing units at an average density of 23.5 per square mile (9.1/km^{2}). The racial makeup of the village was 100.0% White.

There were 4 households, of which 25.0% were married couples living together, 50.0% had a female householder with no husband present, and 25.0% were non-families. 25.0% of all households were made up of individuals, and 25% had someone living alone who was 65 years of age or older. The average household size was 2.25 and the average family size was 2.33.

The median age in the village was 44.5 years. 0.0% of residents were under the age of 18; 22.2% were between the ages of 18 and 24; 33.3% were from 25 to 44; 11.1% were from 45 to 64; and 33.3% were 65 years of age or older. The gender makeup of the village was 33.3% male and 66.7% female.
