= Parkdale, Missouri =

- Village
- Location of Parkdale, Missouri
- Coordinates: 38°28′39″N 90°31′46″W
- Country: United States
- State: Missouri
- County: Jefferson

Area
  - Total: 0.13 sq mi (0.33 km^{2})
  - Land: 0.13 sq mi (0.33 km^{2})
  - Water: 0 sq mi (0.00 km^{2})
- Elevation: 827 ft (252 m)

Population (2020)
  - Total: 159
  - Density: 1,244/sq mi (480.5/km^{2})
- Time zone: UTC-6 (Central (CST))
  - Summer (DST): UTC-5 (CDT)
- ZIP code: 63049
- Area code: 636
- FIPS code: 29-56226
- GNIS feature ID: 2399623

Parkdale is a village in northern Jefferson County, Missouri, United States. As of the 2020 census, Parkdale had a population of 159.

== Geography ==
According to the United States Census Bureau, the village has a total area of 0.13 square miles (0.34 km^{2}), all land.

== Demographics ==
Historical population
Census	Pop.	Note	%±
1960	198		—
1970	836		322.2%
1980	270		−67.7%
1990	212		−21.5%
2000	205		−3.3%
2010	170		−17.1%
2020	159		−6.5%
U.S. Decennial Census

=== 2010 census ===
As of the census of 2010, there were 170 people, 73 households, and 57 families living in the village. The population density was 1,307.7 inhabitants per square mile (504.9/km^{2}). There were 75 housing units at an average density of 576.9 per square mile (222.7/km^{2}). The racial makeup of the village was 96.5% White, 0.6% African American, 2.4% Asian, and 0.6% from two or more races. Hispanic or Latino of any race were 0.6% of the population.

There were 73 households, of which 21.9% had children under the age of 18 living with them, 60.3% were married couples living together, 8.2% had a female householder with no husband present, 9.6% had a male householder with no wife present, and 21.9% were non-families. 17.8% of all households were made up of individuals, and 5.5% had someone living alone who was 65 years of age or older. The average household size was 2.33 and the average family size was 2.63.

The median age in the village was 51.3 years. 15.3% of residents were under the age of 18; 4% were between the ages of 18 and 24; 20.6% were from 25 to 44; 38.8% were from 45 to 64; and 21.2% were 65 years of age or older. The gender makeup of the village was 49.4% male and 50.6% female.

=== 2000 census ===
As of the census of 2000, there were 205 people, 70 households, and 59 families living in the village. The population density was 1,616.4 inhabitants per square mile (624.1/km^{2}). There were 71 housing units at an average density of 559.8 per square mile (216.1/km^{2}). The racial makeup of the village was 97.56% White, 0.49% Asian, 0.98% from other races, and 0.98% from two or more races. Hispanic or Latino of any race were 1.46% of the population.

There were 70 households, out of which 28.6% had children under the age of 18 living with them, 70.0% were married couples living together, 11.4% had a female householder with no husband present, and 14.3% were non-families. 12.9% of all households were made up of individuals, and 4.3% had someone living alone who was 65 years of age or older. The average household size was 2.93 and the average family size was 3.13.

In the village, the population was spread out, with 21.5% under the age of 18, 8.8% from 18 to 24, 27.8% from 25 to 44, 28.3% from 45 to 64, and 13.7% who were 65 years of age or older. The median age was 41 years. For every 100 females, there were 109.2 males. For every 100 females age 18 and over, there were 106.4 males.

The median income for a household in the village was $52,000, and the median income for a family was $56,875. Males had a median income of $41,000 versus $23,594 for females. The per capita income for the village was $17,783. About 3.2% of families and 3.7% of the population were below the poverty line, including none of those under the age of eighteen and 11.1% of those 65 or over.
