= Columbia High School (Illinois) =

Coordinates: 38.4466°N 90.216°W

Location
- 77 Veteran's Parkway; Columbia, Illinois 62236; United States

Information
- School type: Public secondary
- School district: Columbia CUSD4
- Principal: Brian Reeves
- Teaching staff: 67.55 (FTE)
- Grades: 9–12
- Enrollment: 597 (2023-2024)
- Student to teacher ratio: 15.90
- Colors: Blue and white
- Fight song: "On, You Eagles!"
- Athletics conference: Cahokia Conference
- Nickname: Eagles
- Yearbook: The Columbian
- Website: chs.columbia4.org

Columbia High School is a public high school in Columbia, Illinois. It is part of Columbia Community Unit School District 4.

== Athletics ==
Columbia High School's athletic teams compete as members of the Illinois High School Association in the Mississippi Division of the Cahokia Conference.

Columbia High School offers the following interscholastic sports at the varsity level:

- Boys Baseball
- Boys and Girls Basketball
- Boys and Girls Bowling
- Cheerleading
- Boys and Girls Cross country
- Boys Football
- Boys and Girls Golf
- Scholastic Bowl
- Boys and Girls Soccer
- Girls Softball
- Boys and Girls Track
- Girls Volleyball
- Boys Hockey (Club)
- Boys Water polo

Columbia has enjoyed a number of successes on the state level of athletic competitions. The boys baseball team won the state title in 1987 under Coach Jim Stuart and again in 2007 under Coach Dustin Nail. In 2010, Columbia's Cheerleading squad swept both statewide competitive cheerleading competitions by winning the IHSA (Illinois High School Association) and ICCA (Illinois Cheerleading Coaches Association) Championships in the small varsity division. The cheerleaders continued their winning ways by repeating that feat in 2011 and 2012, the only small varsity squad in the entire state to win more than once. In 2012, the Eagles cheerleaders also took first place in the Advanced Co-Ed Division of the NCA High School Open National Championship held in Louisville, KY. In 2013, due to increased enrollment, Columbia cheerleading competed at the medium varsity level against schools with enrollments more than double that of Columbia. They again brought home both the IHSA and ICCA titles in their division.

Columbia High School teams have trophied numerous times in many sports at the state level:

- 1987 Boys Baseball - Illinois State Championship
- 2005 Girls Volleyball Runner-Up
- 2006 Girls Soccer Runner-Up
- 2006 Baseball 4th Place
- 2007 Boys Baseball - Illinois State Championship
- 2007 Scholastic Bowl Runner-Up
- 2007 Football Runner-Up
- 2008 Girls Soccer 3rd Place
- 2008 Football Semi-finalist
- 2009 Competitive Cheerleading Small Varsity 3rd Place
- 2010 Competitive Cheerleading Small Varsity IHSA and ICCA State Champions
- 2010 Boys soccer 3rd Place
- 2011 Boys soccer IHSA Sectional Champions
- 2011 Competitive Cheerleading Small Varsity IHSA and ICCA State Champions
- 2012 Competitive Cheerleading Small Varsity IHSA and ICCA State Champions
- 2012 Competitive Cheerleading NCA High School Open National Champions Advanced Co-ed Division
- 2013 Competitive Cheerleading Medium Varsity IHSA and ICCA State Champions
- 2014 Boys Soccer Class 1A State Champions
- 2019 Girls Soccer Class 1A State Champions
- 2025 Boys Soccer Class 1A State Champions

== Notable alumni ==
- Trent Blank, baseball coach
- Jim Kremmel, Former MLB player (Texas Rangers, Chicago Cubs)
- T. J. Mathews, professional baseball player (MLB 1995–2002)
- Josh Fleming, professional baseball player (Tampa Bay Rays)
- Nelson Mathews, professional baseball player (MLB 1960–1965)
