= Trent Blank =

American baseball coach (born 1989)

Seattle Mariners – No. 40
- Coach
- Born: August 31, 1989 (age 36); St. Louis, Missouri
- Bats: Right Throws: Right

Teams
- Seattle Mariners (2020–present)

Trent Robert Blank (born August 31, 1989) is an American baseball director of pitching strategy coach for the Seattle Mariners of Major League Baseball (MLB).

== Playing career ==
Blank attended Columbia High School in Columbia, Illinois. He was a pitcher and shortstop, helping the school's baseball team win a state championship in 2007. He then played college baseball, pitching for the Baylor Bears. In 2012, he was named a third-team All-American by Collegiate Baseball and the National Collegiate Baseball Writers Association.

The Colorado Rockies drafted Blank in the 30th round of the 2012 MLB draft. He pitched professionally in minor leagues for three seasons, advancing to Single-A in 2014.

== Coaching career ==
After ending his pitching career, Blank was the director of player development for the Dallas Baptist Patriot beginning in the fall of 2017.

Blank joined the Seattle Mariners in 2019 as the coordinator of pitching strategy. In 2020, he served as the acting bullpen coach for the Mariners while Brian DeLunas worked remotely due to the COVID-19 pandemic. Blank became the fulltime bullpen coach in 2021. He also served as the director of pitching strategy beginning in 2021, continuing in that role as a major league coach when the Mariners hired Stephen Vogt as bullpen coach in 2023. In his coaching role, Blank helps pitchers in the majors and minors improve their pitches and change the pitches in their arsenal.

Blank also performs video scouting for the Mariners ahead of the MLB draft. He recommended the Mariners draft future All-Star Bryan Woo in the 2021 MLB draft despite Woo's recent Tommy John surgery.

== Personal life ==
Blank is married and has two children. They reside in Peoria, Arizona. Blank's father was drafted by the Houston Astros in the 18th round of the 1975 MLB draft but did not play professionally.

Blank earned a bachelor's degree from Baylor University in 2014. He earned a master's degree in kinesiology from Dallas Baptist University in 2017.
