= John P. Weinel =

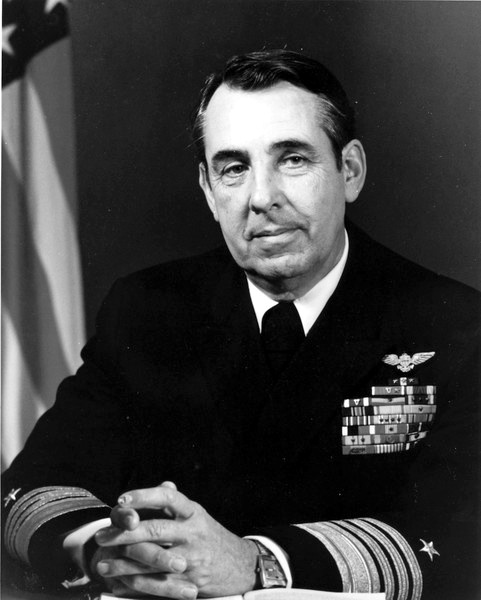
- Born: February 23, 1916; Columbia, Illinois, U.S.
- Died: February 16, 2004 (aged 87); Fallbrook, California, U.S.
- Burial place: Saint Paul Evangelical Cemetery, Columbia, Illinois, U.S.
- Military career
- Allegiance: United States
- Branch: United States Navy
- Service years: 1939–1975
- Rank: Admiral
- Nickname: Blackie
- Commands: Fighter Squadron 14; Fighter Squadron 42; Carrier Air Group 5 Carrier Division 3 USS Great Sitkin (AE-17); USS Ticonderoga (CVA-14); Carrier Division 3
- Conflicts: World War II; Korean War; Vietnam War
- Awards: Defense Distinguished Service Medal; Navy Distinguished Service Medal (4); Legion of Merit (2); Air Medal (8)

John Philip Weinel (February 23, 1916 – February 16, 2004) was an admiral in the United States Navy.

== Early life ==
Weinel was born on 1916 in Columbia, Illinois. He attended public schools in Columbia and enrolled for a year at Illinois State University. He graduated in 1939 from the U.S. Naval Academy.

== Military career ==
=== World War II ===
Weinel saw action in the Pacific theatre as a Destroyer Officer on the USS Maury (DD-401). After becoming a naval aviator, he served in the Composite Squadron 33 and Fighter Squadron 22, and commanded the Fighter Squadron 14. He also served as an Amphibious Staff Officer and as Executive Staff Officer of Carrier Air Group 5.

=== Korean War ===
Weinel served on board the aircraft carrier USS Antietam (CV-36). During the Korean War, he served as an air officer on the aircraft carrier USS Valley Forge (CV-45).

=== Post war ===
From 1956 to 1957, he served in the Carrier Division 5 and from 1961 to 1962, he commanded the ammunition ship USS Great Sitkin (AE-17). He next commanded the aircraft carrier USS Ticonderoga (CVA-14) from 1963 to 1964. Weinel was assigned to the Navy Command Center in the Pentagon from 1967 to 1969.

=== Vietnam War ===
During the Vietnam War, Weinel served as the served as the commander of the Carrier Division 3 and a task group commander.

=== Post war ===
On 1 August 1970, he was promoted to Vice Admiral and on 2 August 1974, he was promoted to Admiral. Weinel served six tours of duty in the Pentagon. His assignments included Director of Political-Military Affairs (Navy), Director of Strategic Plan (Navy), Assistant Deputy Chief of Naval Operations, Director of Plans for the Joint Chiefs of Staff and Assistant to the Chairman of the Joint Chiefs of Staff.

From 1974 to 1977, he was a U.S. Military Representative to the NATO Military Committee. He retired from military service in 1977.

== Later life ==
Weinel and wife Ann had three children, and several grand and great-grandchildren. After his retirement from the Navy, he was an international champion pigeon racer and breeder.

He died in 2004 and was buried at the Saint Paul Evangelical Cemetery in Columbia, Illinois.

== Awards and decorations ==

Naval Aviator Badge
Defense Distinguished Service Medal		Navy Distinguished Service Medal w/ three 5/16" Gold Stars
Legion of Merit w/ Combat "V" and one 5/16" Gold Star	Air Medal w/ Combat "V" and Award numeral 8	Navy and Marine Corps Commendation Medal w/ Combat "V"
Combat Action Ribbon	Navy Presidential Unit Citation w/ one 3/16" bronze star	Navy Commendation Medal w/ three 3/16" bronze stars
Navy Meritorious Unit Commendation	China Service Medal	American Defense Service Medal w/ one 3/16" bronze star
American Campaign Medal	Asiatic-Pacific Campaign Medal w/ four 3/16" bronze stars	World War II Victory Medal
Navy Occupation Service Medal w/ 'Japan' clasp	National Defense Service Medal w/ one 3/16" Bronze Star	Korean Service Medal w/ three 3/16" bronze Stars
Armed Forces Expeditionary Medal	Vietnam Service Medal w/ two 3/16" bronze Stars	Officer of the National Order of Vietnam
Vietnam Gallantry Cross w/ Palm	Republic of Korea Presidential Unit Citation	Vietnam Gallantry Cross Unit Citation
United Nations Service Medal	Vietnam Campaign Medal	Republic of Korea War Service Medal
