= Interstate 255 =

Highway in Illinois and Missouri

Interstate 255
- I-255 highlighted in red

Route information
- Auxiliary route of I-55
- Maintained by IDOT and MoDOT
- Length: 30.82 mi (49.60 km)
- Existed: 1986–present
- History: Completed by 1989
- NHS: Entire route

Major junctions
- West end: I-55 / I-270 in Mehlville, MO
- US 50 / US 61 / US 67 in Mehlville, MO; I-64 / US 50 in Washington Park, IL; I-55 / I-70 / US 40 in Collinsville, IL
- North end: I-270 / IL 255 in Pontoon Beach, IL

Location
- Country: United States
- Counties: MO: St. Louis; IL: Monroe, St. Clair, Madison

Highway system
- Interstate Highway System; Main; Auxiliary; Suffixed; Business; Future
- Missouri State Highway System; Interstate; US; State; Supplemental
- Illinois State Highway System; Interstate; US; State; Tollways; Scenic
← Route 254	MO	→ Route 265
← IL 251	IL	→ IL 255

Interstate 255 (I-255) is a bypass route of I-55 in Greater St. Louis. Along with I-270, it forms a loop around the central portion of the bi-state metro area; a majority of I-255 is located on the Illinois half. It shares its southern terminus with I-270 at the junction with I-55; I-270 and I-255 go to the west and east, respectively. U.S. Route 50 (US 50) joins I-255 at Lemay Ferry Road. It crosses the Mississippi River on the Jefferson Barracks Bridge, enters Illinois, and then turns northeast. There is a junction with I-64, where US 50 breaks off and goes east, and then further north there is a junction with I-55 again, I-70, and US 40, all of which are all cosigned together. The next junction is another one with I-270, which is the northern terminus of I-255. After that, the limited-access freeway continues on as Illinois Route 255 (IL 255). I-255 is 30.82 miles (49.60 km) in length.

== Route description ==
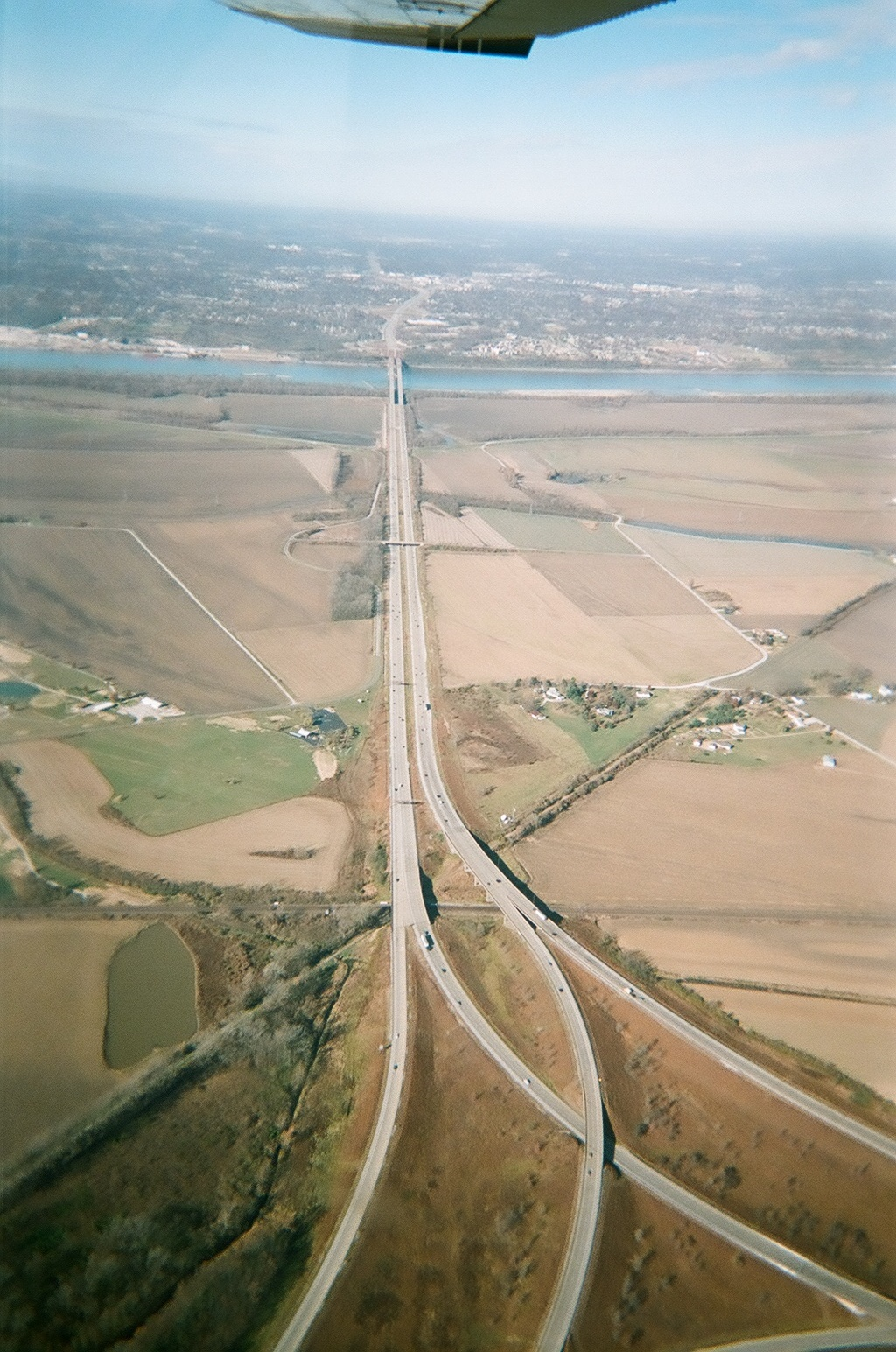
I-255, west of IL 3

I-255's counterclockwise terminus is at an interchange with I-55 and I-270 in Mehlville, Missouri. The beltway is designated as I-270 (with Kansas City as the control city) west of this interchange and as I-255 east (with Chicago as the control city) east of this interchange. The section of I-255 east from this interchange to the Jefferson Barracks Bridge was first built in the 1960s to carry US 50 traffic across the Mississippi River. The roadway was upgraded between 2002 and 2004. Repairs included both new pavement and the replacement of the Telegraph Road bridge.

Once it crosses the Mississippi River and enters Illinois, I-255 is signed as a north–south highway. It is considerably newer than the Missouri section; it was constructed in the 1980s. At the IL 3 interchange, I-255 turns sharply to the north. It briefly overlaps with IL 3 in Dupo. After Dupo, I-255 turns northeast, skirting Cahokia and East St. Louis. An interchange at Mousette Lane in Sauget was constructed in the 1990s and provides motorist access to GCS Ballpark (home to the Gateway Grizzlies baseball team) and the St. Louis Downtown Airport. Given its proximity to the airport, this section of I-255 features shorter light poles to better accommodate takeoffs and landings.

North of Sauget, I-255 traverses a portion of the Frank Holten State Recreation Area before an interchange with I-64 west of Caseyville. This section of freeway opened in 1986. Traffic can enter and exit I-255 at an interchange with Collinsville Road (formerly US 40) just east of the Fairmont Park Racetrack.

I-255 meets I-55/I-70 at an interchange in Collinsville, its original intended terminus. North of this interchange, the control city for I-255 changes from "Chicago" to "To I-270". In the 1980s, I-255 was extended approximately five miles (8.0 km) north to meet I-270 in Pontoon Beach, its current terminus. While the I-255 designation ends at the I-270 interchange, the freeway continues north and west (parallelling the bend in the Mississippi River) for approximately 23 miles (37 km) as IL 255. The decision to not extend the I-255 designation to the new freeway reflects the fact that state and not federal funds were used to pay for construction.

== History ==
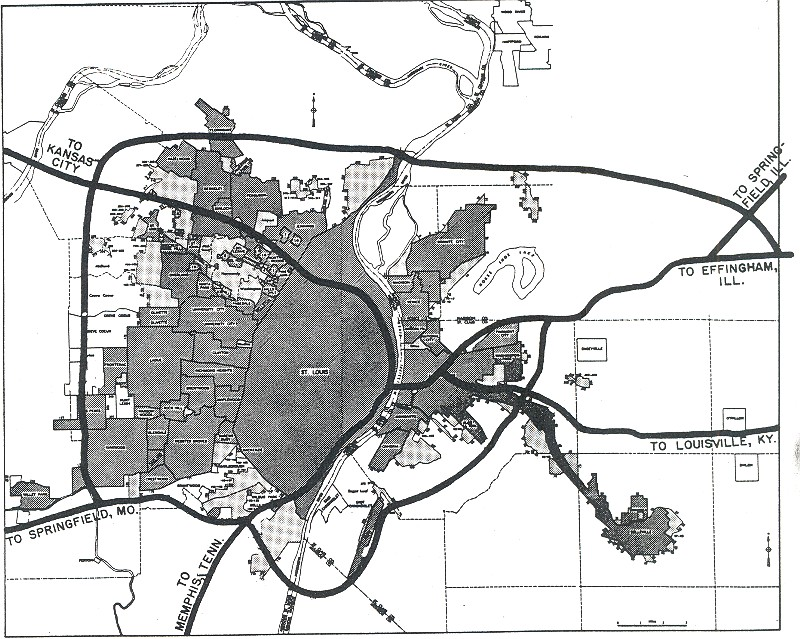
The Yellow Book plan in Greater St. Louis

I-255 route was proposed from I-55/I-244 near Green Park to I-55/70 west of Cahokia Mounds near the intersection with IL 111 when plans surfaced in the 1950s Yellow Book. It was originally designed to be a four lane highway but was changed to six lanes.

Since that routing was to go through the American Bottoms, archaeological investigations had to be conducted prior to any construction, which would later become known as the FAI 270 Series. When Cahokia Mounds was designated in the federal register, an alternative alignment for I-255 from I-64 to I-55/70 was selected. This delayed construction of I-255 until the late 1970s, making it the last Interstate Highway in metropolitan St. Louis to be built.

Both the western (I-270) and eastern (I-255) portions of the Interstate loop around St. Louis were originally designated as I-270. However, the route that Illinois selected ("Corridor 413") included an interchange in Pontoon Beach between the new beltway (running north and south parallel to the Mississippi River) and the existing beltway (running east and west to a terminus at I-55/I-70). As such, two intersecting Interstate Highways would have carried the same route number. As such, the Illinois Department of Transportation (IDOT) concluded a different route number would be necessary for the eastern leg of the beltway. While I-870 was initially considered, informal use of I-255 in contemporary local media coverage led to its widespread adoption. By 1980, IDOT announced that the eastern portion of the St. Louis beltway was to be designated as I-255.

== Exit list ==
State	County	Location	mi	km	Exit	Destinations	Notes
Missouri	St. Louis	Concord	0.00	0.00		I-270 north – Kansas City	Clockwise terminus; continuation beyond I-55
Missouri	St. Louis	Concord–Mehlville line	0.00	0.00	1	I-55 – St. Louis, Memphis	I-55 exit 196; signed as exits 1A (south) & 1B (north); westbound exits and eastbound entrances
Missouri	St. Louis	Mehlville	0.5	0.80	1B	US 61 / US 67 (Lemay Ferry Road)	Eastbound exit and westbound entrance
Missouri	St. Louis	Mehlville	1.2	1.9	1C	US 50 west (Lindbergh Boulevard) to US 61 / US 67 (Lemay Ferry Road)	West end of US 50 overlap; westbound exit and eastbound entrance
Missouri	St. Louis	Mehlville	2.2	3.5	2	Route 231 (Telegraph Road)	
Missouri	St. Louis	Mehlville	3.2	5.1	3	Koch Road	Orientation changes from east-west to north-south
Mississippi River			3.5– 4.0	5.6– 6.4	Jefferson Barracks Bridge		
Illinois	Monroe	Columbia	6.0– 6.9	9.7– 11.1	6	IL 3 south / Great River Road south – Columbia	South end of IL 3 / GRR overlap
Illinois	St. Clair	Dupo	9.2	14.8	9	S. Main Street/Old Route 3 – Dupo	
Illinois	St. Clair	Dupo	10.6	17.1	10	IL 3 north / Great River Road north – Cahokia, East St. Louis	North end of IL 3 / GRR overlap
Illinois	St. Clair	Cahokia	13.0	20.9	13	IL 157 (Camp Jackson Road) – Cahokia	
Illinois	St. Clair	Centreville	15.0	24.1	15	Mousette Lane	
Illinois	St. Clair	Alorton	16.7	26.9	17	IL 15 (New Missouri Avenue) – Belleville, East St. Louis	Signed as exits 17A (east) and 17B (west)
Illinois	St. Clair	East St. Louis	18.6	29.9	19	State Street – East St. Louis	
Illinois	St. Clair	Caseyville	20.1	32.3	20	I-64 / US 50 east – St. Louis, Louisville	I-64 exit 7; north end of US 50 overlap
Illinois	St. Clair–Madison county line	Collinsville	23.6	38.0	24	Collinsville Road	
Illinois	Madison	Collinsville	24.8	39.9	25	I-55 / I-70 / US 40 – Chicago, Indianapolis, St. Louis	I-55/I-70 exit 10; signed as exits 25A (north/east) & 25B (south/west)
Illinois	Madison	Pontoon Beach	26.0	41.8	26	Horseshoe Lake Road	
Illinois	Madison	Pontoon Beach	29.2	47.0	29	IL 162 – Granite City, Glen Carbon	
Illinois	Madison	Pontoon Beach	30.82	49.60	30	I-270 – Indianapolis, Kansas City	I-270 exit 7A westbound, 7 eastbound; counterclockwise terminus
Illinois	Madison	Pontoon Beach	30.82	49.60		IL 255 north (Alton Bypass) – Alton	Continuation north beyond I-270
1.000 mi = 1.609 km; 1.000 km = 0.621 mi: Concurrency terminus; Incomplete access
