= Nelson Mathews =

American baseball player (born 1941)

- Outfielder
- Born: July 21, 1941 (age 83); Columbia, Illinois, U.S.
- Batted: Right Threw: Right

MLB debut
- September 9, 1960, for the Chicago Cubs

Last MLB appearance
- July 18, 1965, for the Kansas City Athletics

MLB statistics
- Batting average: .223
- Home runs: 22
- Runs batted in: 98
- Stats at Baseball Reference

Teams
- Chicago Cubs (1960–1963); Kansas City Athletics (1964–1965)

Nelson Elmer Mathews (born July 21, 1941) is a retired American professional baseball outfielder who appeared in the Major Leagues (MLB) from 1960 to 1965 for the Chicago Cubs and Kansas City Athletics. Born in Columbia, Illinois, he graduated from high school in that community and signed with the Cubs in 1959. Mathews threw and batted right-handed, stood 6 feet 4 inches (1.93 m) tall and weighed 195 pounds (88 kg).

Mathews and made his major league debut with the Cubs on September 9, 1960, against the future world champion Pittsburgh Pirates at Forbes Field. Pinch hitting in the ninth inning for pitcher Mel Wright, he singled off Vinegar Bend Mizell, moved to third base on a double by Richie Ashburn, and came around to score on a single by Don Zimmer. Mathews then spent most of 1961 and 1962 in the minors, where in 1962 he batted .368 and was named an All-Star in the Class B Northwest League.

Mathews then spent the full seasons of 1963 and 1964 in the majors. In the former year, he started 45 games in center field, and appeared in 61 total games played, but batted only .155. After the season, the Cubs traded him to the Athletics for left-handed pitcher Fred Norman. The A's made him their regular center fielder in 1964. Mathews started 154 games in center and hit 14 home runs, but he led the American League in strikeouts (143) and batted only .239. He began 1965 with Kansas City and got into 67 total games, with 47 outfield starts, but he batted a weak .212 and was sent to Triple-A Vancouver in July. He played through 1967 in the minors before retiring from the game.

In 306 career MLB games played, Mathews collected 218 hits, with 39 doubles, 14 triples and 22 homers. He batted .223 lifetime with 98 runs batted in.

His son T. J. Mathews had an eight-season MLB career (1995–2002) as a relief pitcher.
