= Jefferson Barracks Bridge =

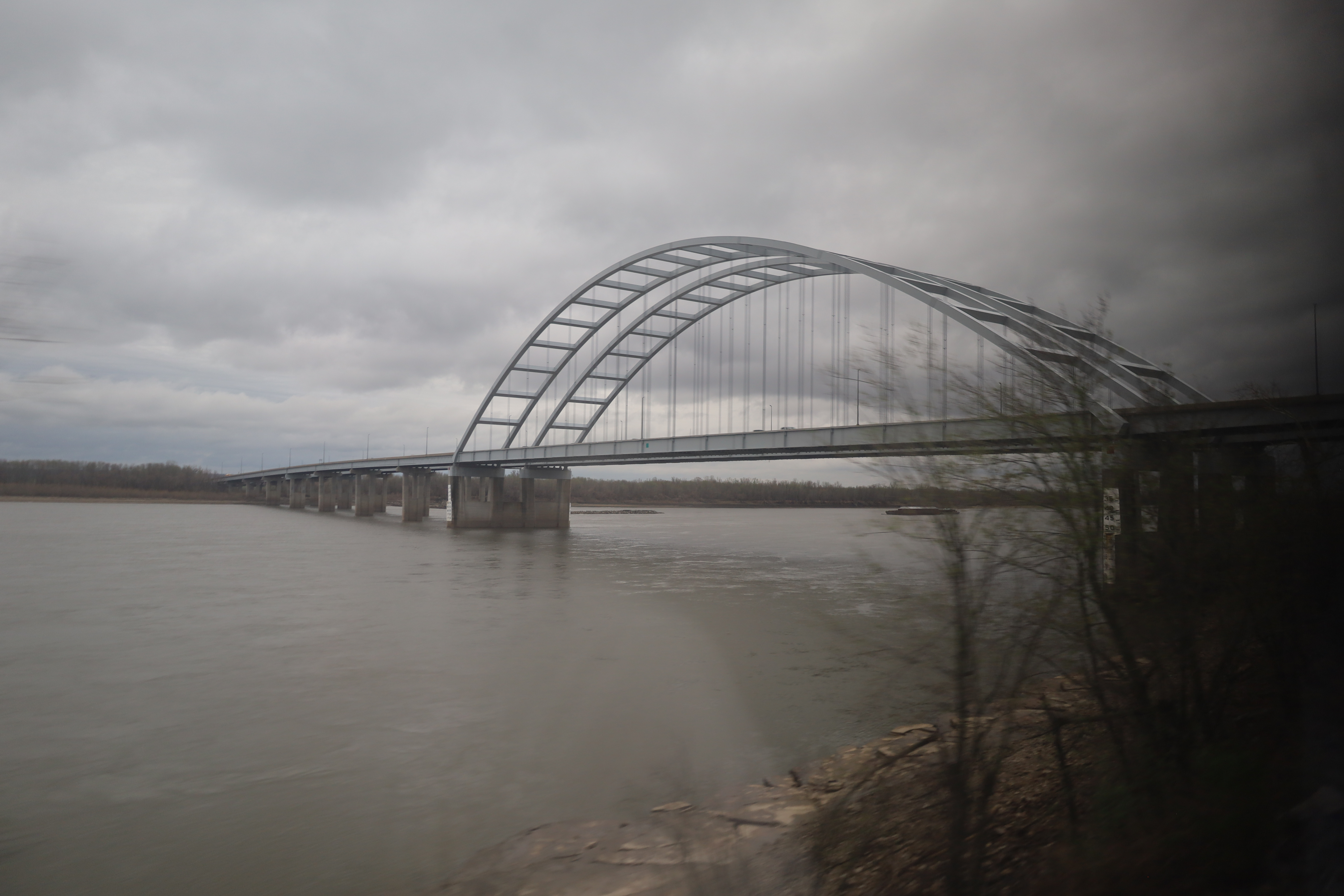
- The bridge in 2026
- Coordinates: 38°29′14″N 90°16′38″W
- Carries: 6 lanes of I-255 / US 50
- Crosses: Mississippi River
- Locale: St. Louis, Missouri and Columbia, Illinois
- Official name: Jefferson Barracks Memorial Arch Bridge
- Other name: J.B. Bridge
- Maintained by: Missouri Department of Transportation

Characteristics
- Design: Twin tied arch bridges
- Total length: 3,998 feet (1,219 m)
- Longest span: 910 feet (277 m)
- Clearance below: 88 feet (27 m)

History
- Opened: Westbound lanes: September 30, 1983; 43 years ago Eastbound lanes: 1992; 34 years ago

Statistics
- Daily traffic: 63,199 (2008)

Location
- Interactive map of Jefferson Barracks Bridge

The Jefferson Barracks Bridge, officially the Jefferson Barracks Memorial Arch Bridge and locally referred to as the JB Bridge, is a pair of bridges across the Mississippi River on the south side of St. Louis, Missouri metropolitan area. The name comes from the nearby Jefferson Barracks National Cemetery, itself originally part of the large Jefferson Barracks military complex, established in 1826 and decommissioned in 1946.

The bridge carries traffic for both Interstate 255 (part of the St. Louis beltway) and U.S. Route 50. Each bridge is 3,998 feet (1,219 m) long with a 909-foot (277 m) long arch bridge spanning the shipping channel.

== History ==
Prior to the construction of the original bridge, river crossings in this area were made via the Davis Street Ferry in the Carondelet neighborhood of St. Louis.

The original Jefferson Barracks Bridge was a steel truss toll bridge that carried U.S. Route 50. Construction on that bridge began on August 5, 1942, and it opened two years later. A toll was charged until 1959, when the construction bonds were paid off.

The northern span of the current bridge was built in 1983. I-255 itself was not built until a few years after the northern bridge opened. The southern span opened in 1992. A delay occurred during the construction of the southern bridge when a crane dropped a section of it into the river and it had to be rebuilt.

== See also ==
- List of crossings of the Upper Mississippi River
