= Missouri Route 231 =

State highway in Missouri, U.S.

Route 231
- Route 231 highlighted in red

Route information
- Maintained by MoDOT
- Length: 12.234 mi (19.689 km)
- Existed: January 1964–present

Major junctions
- South end: US 61 / US 67 in Arnold
- I-255 / US 50 in Mehlville
- North end: River City Casino Boulevard in Lemay

Location
- Country: United States
- State: Missouri
- Counties: Jefferson, St. Louis

Highway system
- Missouri State Highway System; Interstate; US; State; Supplemental
← I-229	→ Route 240

Route 231 is a highway in the St. Louis, Missouri, area. It begins at U.S. Routes 61 and 67 (US 61 / US 67) in Arnold. It follows Telegraph Road through Jefferson and St. Louis counties, being Oakville's main thoroughfare. It then continues further north as Kingston Drive and then Broadway. It ends at River City Casino Boulevard, at the St. Louis city limits. The road continues north, further into St. Louis, as Broadway. It closely parallels the Mississippi River for its entire route.

== Major intersections ==
County	Location	mi	km	Destinations	Notes
Jefferson	Arnold	12.232	19.685	US 61 / US 67 (Jeffco Boulevard)	Southern terminus
Meramec River		10.043	16.163	Bridge	
St. Louis	Mehlville	3.642– 3.631	5.861– 5.844	I-255 / US 50 – Chicago, Memphis	Exit 2 on I-255
St. Louis	Lemay	0.000	0.000	River City Casino Boulevard	Northern terminus; road continues into the City of St. Louis as Broadway
1.000 mi = 1.609 km; 1.000 km = 0.621 mi
