= Columbia Community Unit School District 4 =

School district in Illinois, United States

Address
- 5 Veterans Parkway Columbia, Illinois, 62236; United States

District information
- Type: Public
- Grades: PreK–12
- NCES District ID: 1710740

Students and staff
- Students: 1,926 (2020–2021)

Other information
- Website: www.columbia4.org

Columbia Community Unit School District 4 is a unified school district that services Columbia, a city located on the Mississippi River in the western reaches of Monroe County, Illinois, just south of St. Louis, Missouri. The current superintendent is Christopher Grode. Columbia Community Unit School District 4 is composed of three schools. Parkview Elementary School, Columbia Middle School, and Columbia High School form the triad that compose this district. Respectively, the principals of each of the schools are Mrs. April Becherer of Parkview Elementary, Mrs. Angela Huels of Columbia Middle, and Mr. Brian Reeves of Columbia High. The mascot of the schools in this district is the eagle.

Columbia Middle School hosts a series of clubs, including Spanish Club, a Yearbook creation staff, and a Student Council. Columbia High School has a more diverse set of clubs, which include a prom organization committee, a book club, and National Honor Society.
