= T. J. Mathews =

American baseball player (born 1970)

- Pitcher
- Born: January 9, 1970 (age 56); Columbia, Illinois, U.S.
- Batted: Right Threw: Right

MLB debut
- July 28, 1995, for the St. Louis Cardinals

Last MLB appearance
- July 24, 2002, for the Houston Astros

MLB statistics
- Win–loss record: 32–26
- Earned run average: 3.82
- Strikeouts: 357
- Stats at Baseball Reference

Teams
- St. Louis Cardinals (1995–1997); Oakland Athletics (1997–2001); St. Louis Cardinals (2001); Houston Astros (2002)

Timothy Jay Mathews (born January 9, 1970) is an American former professional baseball pitcher. He played eight seasons in Major League Baseball (MLB) for the St. Louis Cardinals, Oakland Athletics, and Houston Astros from 1995 to 2002.

Mathews was one of the players traded from the St. Louis Cardinals at the 1997 trading deadline in exchange for Mark McGwire. From 2003 to 2006, Mathews pitched for the independent Bridgeport Bluefish and had stints with the Los Angeles Dodgers and Houston Astros Triple-A clubs. In 2006, he was signed by the Pawtucket Red Sox to close out his professional career.

Mathews' father Nelson had a six-season MLB career as an outfielder.

== See also ==
- List of second-generation Major League Baseball players
