= Columbia, Illinois =

Columbia
- City
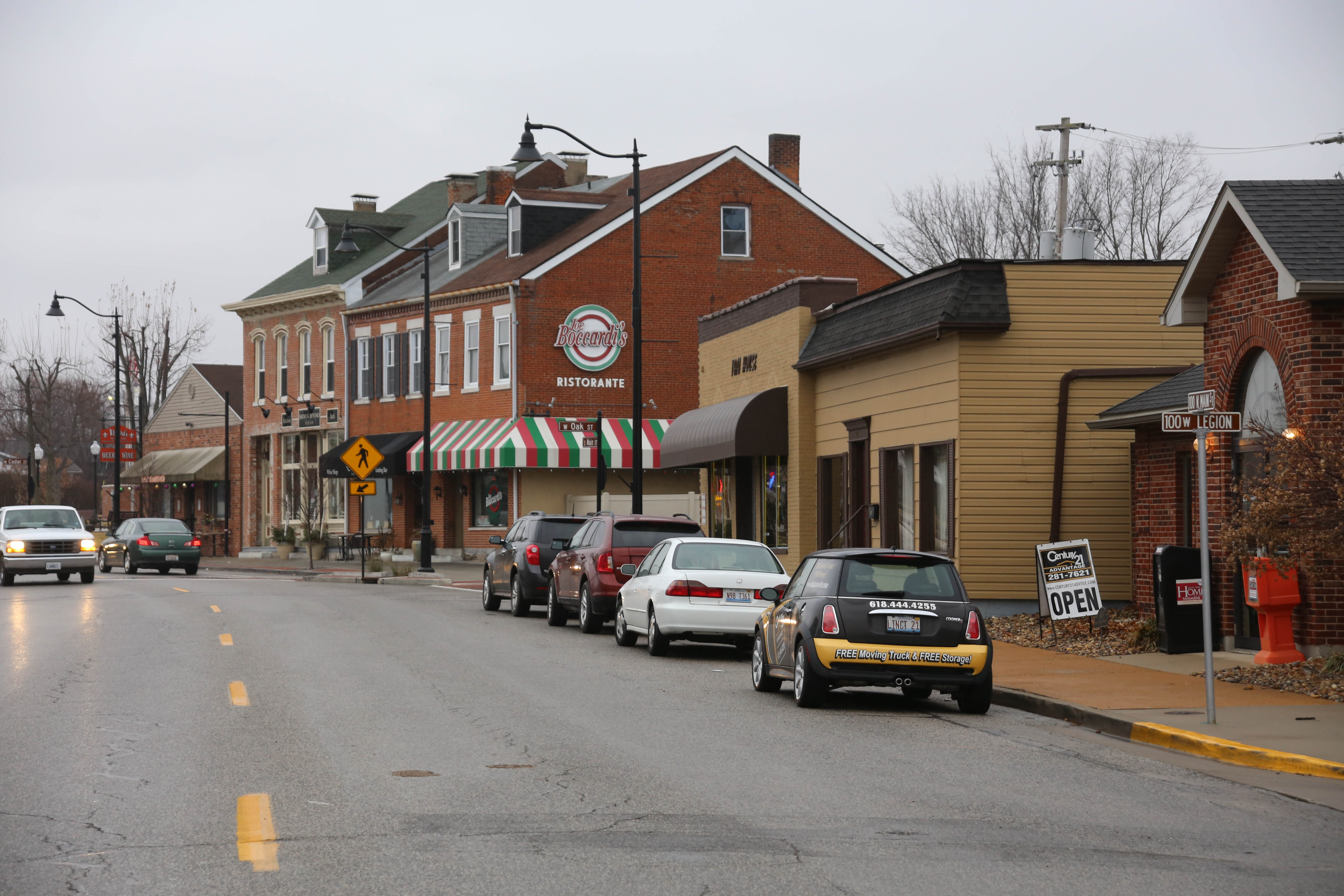
- Downtown Columbia

- Flag Logo
- Motto: Good for business, good for life
- Location of Columbia in Monroe County, Illinois.
- Coordinates: 38°27′52″N 90°14′30″W
- Country: United States
- State: Illinois
- County: St. Clair and Monroe
- Founded: 1859

Area
  - Total: 10.38 sq mi (26.88 km^{2})
  - Land: 10.32 sq mi (26.74 km^{2})
  - Water: 0.054 sq mi (0.14 km^{2})
- Elevation: 446 ft (136 m)

Population (2020)
  - Total: 10,999
  - Density: 1,065.4/sq mi (411.37/km^{2})
- Time zone: UTC−6 (CST)
  - Summer (DST): UTC−5 (CDT)
- ZIP code: 62236
- Area code: 618
- FIPS code: 17-15833
- GNIS feature ID: 2393604
- Website: www.columbiail.gov

Columbia is a city mainly in Monroe County with a small portion in St. Clair County in the U.S. state of Illinois, about 12 miles (19 km) south of St. Louis, Missouri. The population was 10,999 at the 2020 census.

== History ==
Columbia was first incorporated in 1859 as a small farming settlement, but had been occupied by various Native American cultures for 12,000 years. The earliest group encountered by European settlers were members of what became the Illinois Confederation, though they had moved to the area from the Great Lakes region only a few centuries before.

In 1873, the St. Louis and Cairo Railroad (Then the Cairo and St. Louis Railroad) Opened a track and station at Columbia. The line and service was sold in 1886 to the Mobile and Ohio Railroad.

== Geography ==
According to the 2010 census, Columbia has a total area of 10.476 square miles (27.13 km^{2}), of which 10.41 square miles (26.96 km^{2}) (or 99.37%) is land and 0.066 square miles (0.17 km^{2}) (or 0.63%) is water.

Columbia is bounded on the west by the Mississippi River. Running in a diagonal line just northeast of Columbia is the border of St. Clair County, beyond which lies Dupo to the north and Millstadt to the east. To the south is Waterloo. Waterloo and Columbia are expected to grow right up to the borders of the other, in effect extending St. Louis's urban sprawl from South St. Louis County across the Jefferson Barracks Bridge into the heart of the formerly rural Monroe County.

=== Climate ===
The climate in this area is characterized by hot, humid summers and generally cool winters. According to the Köppen Climate Classification system, Columbia, IL has a humid subtropical climate, abbreviated "Cfa" on climate maps.

Climate data for Columbia, IL
Month	Jan	Feb	Mar	Apr	May	Jun	Jul	Aug	Sep	Oct	Nov	Dec	Year
Average precipitation inches (mm)	2.5 (64)	2.4 (61)	3.3 (84)	4.0 (100)	4.8 (120)	4.2 (110)	4.1 (100)	3.2 (81)	3.4 (86)	3.5 (89)	3.8 (97)	3.1 (79)	42.3 (1,071)
Source: bestplaces.net

== Demographics ==
Historical population
Census	Pop.	Note	%±
1850	378		—
1860	1,080		185.7%
1870	1,246		15.4%
1880	1,308		5.0%
1890	1,267		−3.1%
1900	1,197		−5.5%
1910	2,076		73.4%
1920	1,592		−23.3%
1930	1,791		12.5%
1940	1,871		4.5%
1950	2,179		16.5%
1960	3,174		45.7%
1970	4,188		31.9%
1980	4,269		1.9%
1990	5,524		29.4%
2000	7,922		43.4%
2010	9,707		22.5%
2020	10,999		13.3%
U.S. Decennial Census

=== Racial and ethnic composition ===
Columbia city, Illinois – Racial and ethnic composition Note: the US Census treats Hispanic/Latino as an ethnic category. This table excludes Latinos from the racial categories and assigns them to a separate category. Hispanics/Latinos may be of any race.
Race / Ethnicity (NH = Non-Hispanic)	Pop 2000	Pop 2010	Pop 2020	% 2000	% 2010	% 2020
White alone (NH)	7,755	9,340	10,210	97.89%	96.22%	92.83%
Black or African American alone (NH)	8	33	59	0.10%	0.34%	0.54%
Native American or Alaska Native alone (NH)	14	11	16	0.18%	0.11%	0.15%
Asian alone (NH)	27	63	67	0.34%	0.65%	0.61%
Native Hawaiian or Pacific Islander alone (NH)	0	0	0	0.00%	0.00%	0.00%
Other race alone (NH)	1	3	30	0.01%	0.03%	0.27%
Mixed race or Multiracial (NH)	41	67	363	0.52%	0.69%	3.30%
Hispanic or Latino (any race)	76	190	254	0.96%	1.96%	2.31%
Total	7,922	9,707	10,999	100.00%	100.00%	100.00%

=== 2020 census ===
As of the 2020 census, Columbia had a population of 10,999. The median age was 40.5 years. 24.3% of residents were under the age of 18 and 16.8% were 65 years of age or older. For every 100 females, there were 97.9 males, and for every 100 females age 18 and over, there were 93.1 males age 18 and over.

96.8% of residents lived in urban areas, while 3.2% lived in rural areas.

There were 4,315 households, of which 33.8% had children under the age of 18 living in them. Of all households, 58.3% were married-couple households, 13.8% were households with a male householder and no spouse or partner present, and 22.7% were households with a female householder and no spouse or partner present. About 24.4% of all households were made up of individuals and 11.8% had someone living alone who was 65 years of age or older.

There were 4,545 housing units, of which 5.1% were vacant. The homeowner vacancy rate was 1.0% and the rental vacancy rate was 6.4%.

=== 2010 census ===
As of the census of 2010, there were 9,707 people. 3,792 households and 2,692 families reside in the city. The population density was 932.5 people per square mile. There were 3,977 housing units at an average density of 382 per square mile. The racial makeup of the city was 97.4% White, 0.4% African American, 0.1% Native American, 0.7% Asian, 0.6% from other races, and 0.9% from two or more races. Hispanic or Latino of any race were 2% of the population.

There were 3,792 households, out of which 32.9% had children under the age of 18 living with them, 59.1% were married couples living together, 8.6% had a female householder with no husband present, and 29.0% were non-families. 24.2% of all households were made up of individuals, and 10.9% had someone living alone who was 65 years of age or older. The average household size was 2.53 and the average family size was 3.03.

In the city, the age distribution of the population shows 25.0% under the age of 18, 5.3% from 20 to 24, 25.6% from 25 to 44, 27.9% from 45 to 64, and 14.3% who were 65 years of age or older. The median age was 39.6 years. For every 100 females, there were 94.4 males. For every 100 females age 18 and over, there were 89.7 males.

The median income for a household in the city was $67,333 and the median income for a family was $90,486. Males had a median income of $59,396 versus $43,594 for females. The per capita income for the city was $32,243. About 2.3% of families and 4.7% of the population were below the poverty line, including 1.7% of those under age 18 and 3.4% of those age 65 or over.

== Education ==
Columbia is served by the public K-12 school district Columbia Community Unit School District 4. District #4 includes Eagleview Elementary School (pre-k – 1), Parkview Elementary School (2–4), Columbia Middle School (5–8), and Columbia High School. Also located in the city is Immaculate Conception School, a private Roman Catholic grade school with grades from Pre-k to eighth.

== Transportation ==
=== Highways ===
To get to places in other towns and cities, Columbians rely mostly on the four highways located nearby. Illinois Route 3 is the only highway that runs through the city. It connects Columbia with Dupo and Cahokia in the northwest and Waterloo and Red Bud from the southeast. Illinois Route 158 has its western terminus just south of the city off of Route 3 and connects Columbia with Millstadt.

Interstate 255 and U.S. Route 50 overlap in St. Louis and continue over the Jefferson Barracks Bridge to Columbia, where they overlap again with Route 3 in an area just north of the city.

=== Airport ===
There is a small airport, Sackman Field, on the western edge of town, named for the former Columbia schools music director, Uhl Sackman.

=== Public transportation ===
A public bus service, provided by MetroBus, arrives in the morning and evening in Columbia and Waterloo and transports people to the MetroLink station in East St. Louis.

== Notable people ==
- Josh Fleming, pitcher for the Pittsburgh Pirates and Tampa Bay Rays
- Caden Glover, professional soccer player for Saint Louis City SC.
- Nelson Mathews, outfielder for the Chicago Cubs and Kansas City Athletics
- T. J. Mathews, pitcher for the St. Louis Cardinals and Oakland Athletics and Houston Astros
- Aedan Stanley, soccer player
- John P. Weinel, United States Navy Admiral

== See also ==
- USS Columbia (SSN-771)
