= USS Great Sitkin =

US Navy ammunition ship

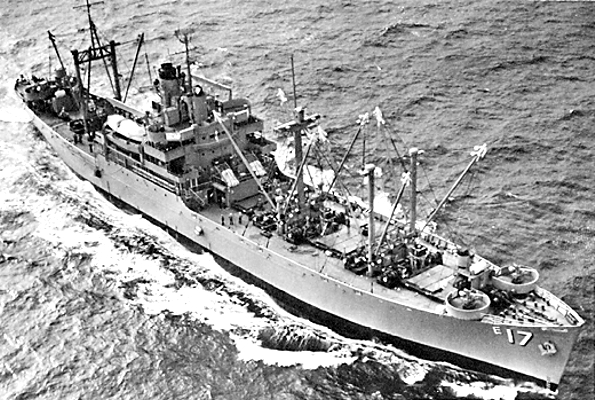
- USS Great Sitkin (AE-17)

History

United States
- Name: USS Great Sitkin
- Namesake: Great Sitkin Volcano in the Aleutian Islands, Alaska
- Builder: North Carolina Shipbuilding Company
- Launched: 20 January 1945
- Commissioned: 11 August 1945
- Stricken: 2 July 1973
- Motto: Always Ready
- Honors and awards: 2 stars for Vietnam War service
- Fate: Scrapped 1974

General characteristics
- Class & type: Mount Hood class ammunition ship
- Displacement: 15,295 t.(fl)
- Length: 459 feet 2 inches
- Beam: 63 feet
- Draft: 28 ft 3 in (8.6 m)
- Propulsion: 1 General Electric geared turbine engine; 2 Combustion Engineering "header-type" boilers, 450psi 750°; 2 General Electric Main Reduction Gears; 3 300kW 120V/240V D.C. Ship's Service Generators; 1 propeller, 6,000shp
- Speed: 16 knots
- Capacity: 7,700 long tons (7,800 t) deadweight
- Complement: 267 Officers and Enlisted
- Armament: 1 single 5"/38 cal gun mount; 4 single 3"/50 cal gun mounts; 2 twin 40mm AA gun mounts; 8 twin 20mm AA gun mounts

USS Great Sitkin (AE-17) was a Mount Hood class ammunition ship, which served in the United States Navy from 1945 to 1973. USS Great Sitkin supported USN operations in several major theatres, including the Mediterranean, the Atlantic, Cuban Missile Blockade, Guantanamo Bay, and the Vietnam War. In the tradition of naming ammunition ships after volcanos, AE-17 was named after the Great Sitkin Volcano in Alaska.

== Early service ==
USS Great Sitkin was launched under Maritime Commission contract by North Carolina Shipbuilding Co., Wilmington, N.C., 20 January 1945, sponsored by Miss Anne L. Dimond, daughter of Judge Anthony J. Dimond, then congressional representative for Alaska, and commissioned at Charleston, South Carolina.

After shakedown out of Norfolk, Great Sitkin sailed to New York 25 November 1945 to begin dumping condemned ammunition in an assigned area off Sandy Hook, N.J. Great Sitkin continued this duty for a year, returning to Norfolk in November 1946. Great Sitkin's pattern of operations for the next few years took her to the Caribbean and the Panama Canal Zone on ammunition replenishment trips, as well as twice to Gibraltar. In addition, she participated in local operations.

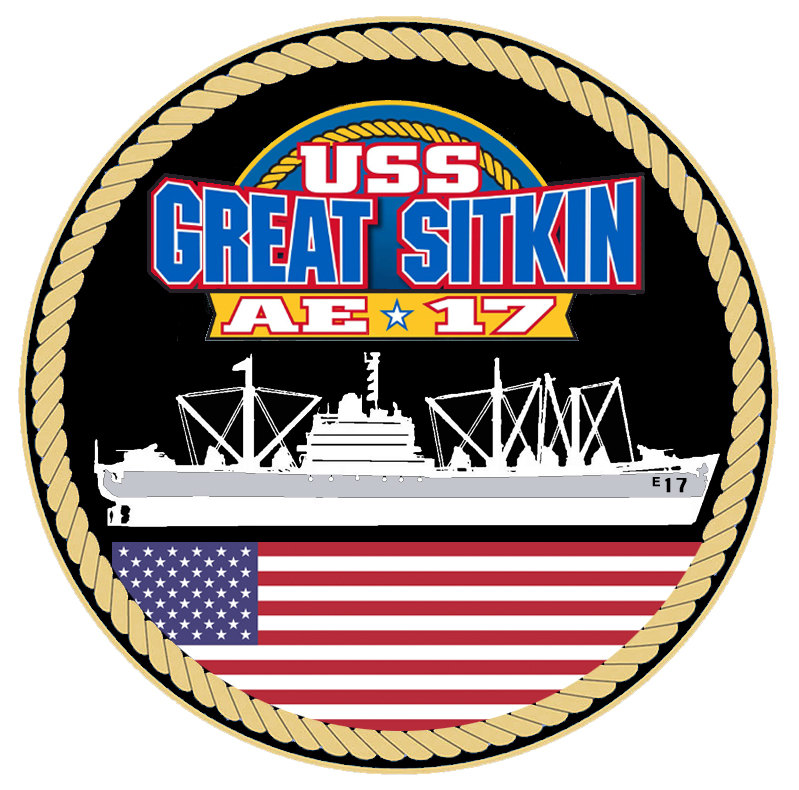
Great Sitkin Challenge Coin

== Mediterranean service ==
From 1951 Great Sitkin served as a mobile ready reserve source of ammunition. Great Sitkin regularly deployed to the Mediterranean to support regional operations of the Sixth Fleet, and served the fleet during crises in trouble spots such as Lebanon and Suez. When not deployed in the Mediterranean, she operated out of New York, participating in various fleet maneuvers in the Atlantic and the Caribbean Sea.

== Cuban Missile blockade ==
During the Cuban Missile Crisis, she sailed for the Caribbean Sea on 23 October 1962, following President Kennedy's announcement of a naval quarantine around Cuba. USS Great Sitkin cruised the Caribbean during the next several weeks carrying reserve ammunition for American ships on quarantine duty off Cuba.

== Atlantic and Mediterranean service ==
Departing the Caribbean 16 December 1962, USS Great Sitkin returned to New York and resumed her pattern of operations in the Atlantic and the Mediterranean. On 5 April 1963, Great Sitkin suffered slight damage during a fire of unknown origin while tied up at the Main Ship Repair Corporation in Brooklyn, New York.

Between August 1963 and July 1966 Great Sitkin deployed three times with the 6th Fleet, participating in several Fleet and NATO exercises. After a 3-month overhaul in the Bethlehem Shipbuilding Corporation, Hoboken, N.J., in December 1966 USS Great Sitkin participated in training exercises off Guantanamo Bay, Cuba. Great Sitkin continued to support American ships in the Atlantic and the Mediterranean theaters.

== Vietnam War service ==
In 1968, Great Sitkin supported the Seventh Fleet during U.S. Naval operations in the Vietnam War. USS Great Sitkin participated in the Vietnamese Counteroffensive - Phase IV and Vietnamese Counteroffensive - Phase V, from May to October 1968. Great Sitkin was awarded 2 campaign stars for Vietnam War service.

== Final disposition ==
USS Great Sitkin was decommissioned and struck from the Naval Register on 2 July 1973. The ship was sold by the Defense Reutilization and Marketing Service for scrapping, 1 March 1974 to US Ship Co., Camden, New Jersey. for $152,666.60. USS Great Sitkin was dismantled from March to October 1974.

== Awards ==
- American Campaign Medal
- World War II Victory Medal (United States)
- Navy Occupation Service Medal with Europe clasp
- National Defense Service Medal (2)
- Armed Forces Expeditionary Medal
- Vietnam Service Medal (2)
- Vietnam Campaign Medal
