= List of Illinois tornadoes =

List of tornadoes in the U.S. state of Illinois

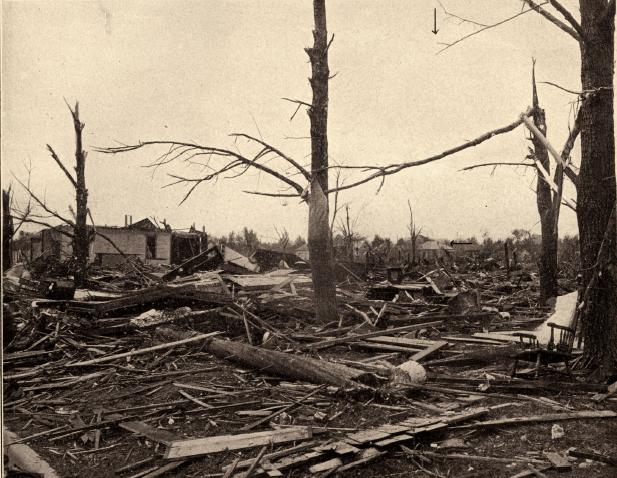
Tornado damage caused by a tornado that occurred in the tornado outbreak sequence of May 25 – June 1, 1917.

Tornadoes in the U.S. state of Illinois are common, with 3,214 tornadoes occurring within state boundaries since 1950. These tornadoes have collectively resulted in 235 deaths.

== Climatology ==
Illinois' climate is relatively average, and is only ideal for the formation of tornadoes in certain parts of the year, especially February, March and May. Warm air from the Southern United States can reach up into the Southern Illinois, resulting in tornadic storms. Illinois' proximity to Lake Michigan also results in cold air moving toward the Ohio Valley, creating the "hot-cold" effect seen in the traditional Tornado Alley. Illinois has had large tornado outbreaks in the past, including the tornado outbreak sequence of December 18–20, 1957 and the 1967 Oak Lawn tornado outbreak.

Illinois is vulnerable to tornadoes with an average of 35 occurring annually, which puts much of the state at around 5 tornadoes per 10,000 square miles (30,000 km^{2}) annually. Peak tornado activity occurs between February and May, but storms can and have produced tornadoes in the winter.

== Events ==
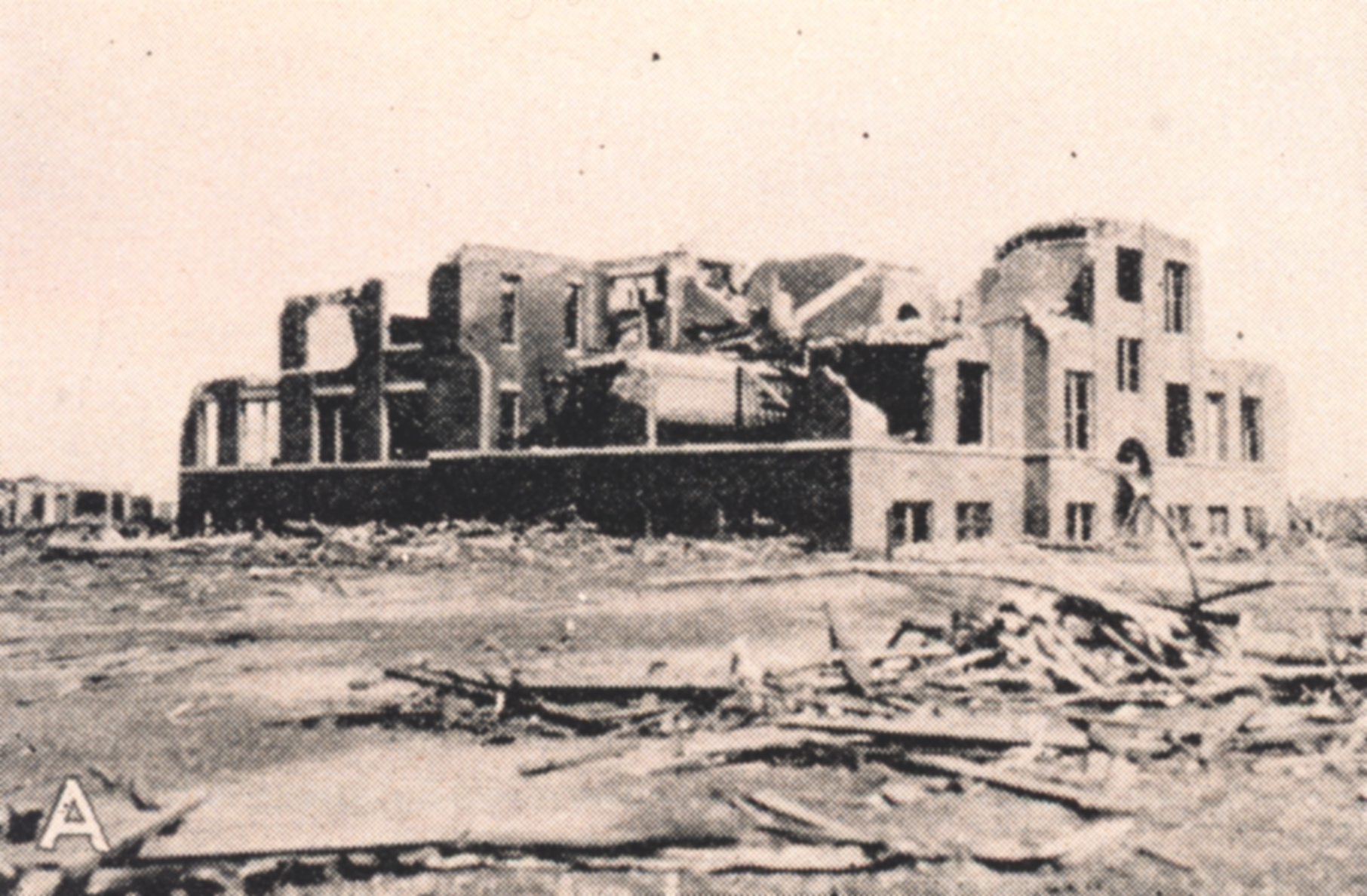
The Longview School in Murphysboro, where 17 students were killed by the 1925 Tri-State tornado.

=== Pre-1950 ===
- April 18, 1880 – A violent F4 tornado tracked through Winnebago County, destroying multiple farms and killing one person before crossing the state line into Wisconsin, where more damage to homes occurred. An F2 tornado hit Lyndon, destroying farmsteads. An FU tornado destroyed multiple homes near Greenville.
- Tornado outbreak of April 24, 1880 – One of only two F5-strength tornadoes to affect central or southeast Illinois. This tornado touched down 9 miles southwest of Taylorville, then moved northeast through Taylorville (Langley/Langleyville) before lifting northeast of Sharpsburg. Bodies of people and cattle were reportedly carried over a half-mile. 6 reported fatalities and 33 injuries.
- February 19, 1884 – An FU tornado struck Caseyville, and another FU tornado caused an unknown amount of damage in Metropolis.
- March 27, 1890 – A relatively destructive F2 tornado initially touched down in Missouri before crossing the state line into Randolph County. No known injuries occurred. Another F2 tornado touched down in Missouri, crossing the state border into Sunfield, killing 3 people. An F2 tornado killed one person in Centreville. A violent F4 tornado touched down in Missouri before moving into Jackson County, killing 7 people and destroying multiple structures. An F2 tornado also tracked through areas south of McClure. Another F4 tornado also touched down in Missouri, before tracking through Alexander, Union, Johnson and Williamson counties, killing 2 people along its path. A long-lived F3 killed 2 people in Washington County, and an F4 tornado moved through Massac and Pope counties, killing 21 or more people and injuring over 200. An F2 tornado hit Olney, damaging or destroying an estimated 33 homes and injuring 5. Another F2 tornado tracked across Wayne and Clay counties, injuring 10 people. The final tornado to occur in Illinois during the outbreak was an F2 that tracked though White County, killing one person and injuring 10 others.
- May 25, 1896 – A violent and destructive F4 tornado moved through Ogle County, destroying a church and killing 4 people. An F2 tornado touched down south of Byron, destroying a farm and damaging trees. A long-tracked F3 tornado moved from Davis Junction to Irene, killing 3 people and destroying 11 farms. A brief but destructive F3 tornado touched down in Edison Park, Chicago, damaging or destroying 36 buildings.
- May 27, 1896 – A catastrophic and devastating F4 tornado moved through St. Louis and East St. Louis, killing over 255 people and injuring 1,000 or more. It is the third-deadliest tornado in United States history, and caused over $10 million (1896 USD) in damages. An extremely violent F4 tornado destroyed farms in Washington and Jefferson counties, killing 14 people. Another F4 tornado tracked through St. Clair and Clinton counties, killing 24. The final tornado in Illinois of the outbreak moved through Jefferson County, killing 3 people and damaging crops and other structures at EF3 intensity.
- April 29, 1909 – A violent F4 tornado tore through Saline and Gallatin counties, killing five people and causing heavy damage in Texas City. The tornado had a maximum width of 200 yards.
- May 26, 1917 – An FU tornado briefly touched down near Pleasant Hill, causing an unknown amount of damage but no injuries. An extremely violent high-end F4 tornado moved across Illinois, killing 101 people and injuring a further 638. The hardest-hit community was Mattoon, where almost 500 buildings were destroyed. The tornado had maximum windspeeds of around 300 mph. A high-end F3 tornado tracked through Coles and Clark counties, destroying farm and injuring 15 people. Another F4 tornado touched down in Will County before crossing the state line into Indiana, killing 3 people along its 33-mile track. A brief FU tornado killed one person in Randolph County, and another FU tornado caused $80,000 (1917 USD) in damages to Willisville. An FU tornado caused minimal damage in Jackson County.
- May 27, 1917 – A destructive F3 tornado touched down in Missouri, before crossing into Randolph County. One person was killed near Chester.
- May 30, 1917 – Two separate tornadoes touched down in Ste. Genevieve County in Missouri before crossing the state line into Randolph County, inflicting F2 and F3 damage to at least 10 structures.
- March 18, 1925 – An extremely destructive and incredibly deadly F5 tornado moved through three states, one being Illinois. The tornado killed 695, making it the deadliest tornado in United States history. It was particularly violent in Williamson County, and 102 people were killed in West Frankfort.
- May 9, 1927 – An F3 tornado killed one person and injured 12 others in Schuyler and Fulton counties. An F2 tornado briefly touched down near Eden, deroofing a farmhouse but caused no fatalities. Another high-end F3 tornado tracked 45 miles across Christian and Macon counties, killing one person. A short-lived F2 tornado destroyed several barns near Owaneco. A destructive F3 tornado damaged homes and injured 21 people in Williamson County, and an F2 tornado killed 2 people in Massac County.
- September 29, 1927 – An F3 tornado moved through East St. Louis, killing 79 people and injuring a further 550. Losses from the tornado totaled $53 million (1927 USD). An F2 tornado deroofed a home south of Morrisonville, and a tornado inflicted F3 damage to structures in Cowden, killing two people and causing $10,000 (1927 USD) in damages. An F2 tornado destroyed and damaged several barns in Edgar County, and an FU tornado was reported in Conlogue.
- March 16, 1942 – A violent F4 tornado moved through Piatt, Champaign and Vermilion counties, destroying over 40 structures and killing 12 people. An F2 tornado damaged 13 farmsteads in Fulton County, and another F2 tornado damaged 10 farmsteads in Knox and Peoria counties. A destructive F5 tornado killed 7 people in or around Lacon, and losses from the tornado totaled $600,000 (1942 USD). This tornado is the most recent F5 or EF5 tornado to hit Central Illinois. An F2 tornado killed two people in Lincoln County, and an FU tornado was reported west of Findlay.
- April 12, 1945 – An F2 tornado tracked through portions of Missouri before crossing the state line into Adams County, causing $3 million (1945 USD) in damages. Another F2 tornado moved through Hancock and McDonough, causing $200,000 (1945 USD) in damages but killing nobody. An F2 tornado hit Industry, causing minimal damage to structures. An F2 tornado hit Missouri, before dissipating shortly past the state line in Quincy. 11 people were injured, and the tornado caused $250,000 (1945 USD) in damages.

=== 1950–1959 ===
- March 27, 1950 – A strong F2 tornado tracked across McLean County, causing $2,500 (1950 USD) in damages.
- June 27, 1951 – A high-end F3 tornado moved through Logan and Macon counties, damaging various structures along its 9.6-mile path. Another F3 tornado tracked across Logan and De Witt counties, killing one person and causing $2.5 million (1951 USD) in damages.
- May 24, 1952 – An F1 tornado tracked down a runway at Scott Air Force Base, damaging 11 aircraft and destroying a building. Losses from the tornado totaled $25,000 (1952 USD).
- March 14, 1953 – A long-tracked and destructive F2 tornado moved through Washington, Jefferson and Marion counties, destroying one home and damaging various structures along its 42.3-mile track.
- April 7, 1954 – An F3+ tornado tracked through areas southwest of Saunemin, and an F3 tornado destroyed 38 homes and killed one person in Kankakee County.
- May 26, 1955 – An F2 tornado briefly tracked through areas east of Coatsburg. Another F2 touched down south of Pekin, causing minimal damage. An F1 moved through Burbank, and a long-tracked tornado inflicted F1 damage to structures in Kankakee and Will counties.
- December 18, 1957 – An intense F3 tornado moved through Randolph and Perry counties, causing $25,000 (1957 USD) in damages, and another tornado damaged or destroyed 24 or more homes at F3 intensity in Willisville. A short-lived but strong F2 tornado touched down in Northern Roxana, damaging nine buildings and injuring one person. A brief F1 tornado caused minimal damage in Mason City, and an F3 tornado hit the crossroads of Illinois Routes 154–150, damaging six homes and causing $250,000 (1957 USD) in damages. An F2 tornado moved for 4.5 miles across Jefferson County, deroofing multiple buildings and injuring two people. A violent F4 tornado touched down south of Roaches, reaching a maximum width of 250 yards and killing one person. Losses from the tornado totaled $2.5 million (1957 USD). An F2 tornado moved through Jackson County, damaging multiple properties but killing nobody. A weak and relatively short-tracked F33 tornado touched down in Missouri before crossing state lines into Randolph County, causing $25,000 (1957 USD) in damages to freight cars and buildings. An F2 tornado hit the outskirts of Mount Vernon, damaging 12 buildings. A destructive and violent F5 tornado hit Sunfield, completely destroying the town and killing 3 people. The tornado injured 6, and caused up to $250,000 (1957 USD) in damages. Another violent and long-tracked tornado inflicted F4 damage to multiple structures in Jackson, Williamson and Franklin counties. Losses from the tornado totaled $4.5 million (1957 USD), and up to 200 people were injured. An F3 tornado tracked 19.6 miles in Wayne and Clay counties, injuring one person and damaging 20 structures. A brief F2 tornado touched down in Carbondale, and an F3 tornado damaged four farmsteads in Jasper County. Another brief F3 tornado moved through Dahlgren, damaging or destroying several homes. A long-lived F3 tornado tracked across Hamilton, White and Edwards counties, damaging 20 farmsteads and injuring 4 people. A very brief tornado touched down in Johnson County, damaging 4 buildings, including a church. An F1 tornado caused minimal damage along a 3-mile track in Vermilion County.
- December 19, 1957 – A brief F2 tornado damaged numerous structures in Jefferson County, and another F2 tornado damaged a barn south of Harrisburg.
- February 10, 1959 – A violent F4 tornado initially touched down in St. Louis, Missouri before crossing the state line into Brooklyn. 21 were killed, 345 were injured, and the tornado caused an estimated $50.25 million (1959 USD) in damages to the Greater St. Louis area. A weak but long-lived F1 tornado moved through Washington, Jefferson and Marion counties, damaging 10 farmsteads. Another F1 tornado briefly touched down north of Palestine, injuring one person and damaging 10 structures.

=== 1960–1969 ===
- April 30, 1960 – An F1 tornado briefly moved through Atlanta, causing an estimated $2,500 (1960 USD) in damages.
- May 6, 1960 – A brief F1 tornado damaged an aircraft hangar in Flora. Another brief F1 tornado touched down east of Long Creek, damaging 3 homes. A weak but long-tracked F1 tornado moved through Greene, Macoupin, Morgan and Sangamon counties, causing minimal damage along its 43.5-mile track. An F2 tornado also tracked across Coles and Douglas counties, only damaging one barn.
- April 23, 1961 – A strong and long-tracked through Will County before crossing the state line into Indiana. The tornado traveled 51.7 miles, injured 4 people, and caused $2.75 million (1961 USD) in damages.
- April 24, 1961 – A long-tracked F3 tornado tore across Pike, Scott and Morgan counties, destroying multiple structures and injuring 3 people.
- May 28, 1962 – An F0 tornado briefly touched the ground northeast of Nekoma, and another brief F0 hit Galva, causing no damage. A brief but strong F2 tornado damaged several structures south of Genseo, and damages from the tornado totaled $250,000 (1962 USD).
- May 29, 1962 – A weak F1 tornado briefly touched down in the Coal Valley area, causing minimal damage to roofs. The tornado had a maximum width of 10 yards.
- April 11, 1965 – A strong and long-tracked F1 tornado moved through Stephenson County, uprooting over 15 trees before crossing the state line into Wisconsin. Up to 47 people were injured, and the tornado caused an estimated $5 million (1965 USD) in damages.
- June 9, 1966 – Three tornadoes touched down in Cook County, the first of which was an F0 tornado that briefly touched down. Two F2 tornadoes touched down, one briefly, and the latter killing one person and injuring 30 others along a 2.5-mile path.
- January 24, 1967 – A relatively brief F2 tornado touched down near Gladstone, tracking through Western Henderson County and causing $25,000 (1967 USD) in damages. An intense F3 tornado moved from Burke to areas near Mount Carroll, injuring 12 people and causing extensive damage to barns and other structures. An F2 tornado hit Mason County, damaging an airplane and injuring one person. An F3 tornado killed one person near Bluff City, and a strong F2 tornado snapped trees in Tazewell and Woodford counties. Another strong F2 tornado damaged up to 100 homes, with costs from the tornado totaling $250,000 (1967 USD). An F2 tornado briefly tracked through areas northwest of Metamora, and another F2 tornado moved through the Champaign–Urbana metropolitan area.
- May 15, 1968 – A high-end F3 tornado tracked 12.3 miles through Mason and Logan counties, damaging 15 homes. A strong F1 tornado touched down south of Waynesville, moving through De Witt County and killing 4 people. An F3 tornado damaged homes and destroyed 25 freight cars east of Milford, and another F3 tornado killed 4 people near Freeburg.

=== 1970–1979 ===
- April 19, 1970 – A brief F1 tornado touched down south of Thebes, damaging several homes.
- June 14, 1970 – A multi-vortex tornado briefly inflicted F1 damage to Mitchell, killing a dog. A camper was lofted over 300 feet in the air by the tornado.
- June 16, 1970 – An F2 tornado caused damage in McLean County, and an F1 tornado caused minor damage to farms and outbuildings in Colfax. Another F1 tornado briefly touched down in Ford County, inflicting damage to outbuildings, and an F1 tornado caused minor damage to structures in Clark County.
- April 1, 1974 – A relatively brief but strong F3 moved through Lawrence County, damaging a school bus depot and multiple mobile homes.
- April 3, 1974 – A brief F0 tornado touched down in Morris, causing an unknown amount of damage. Another brief F0 tornado tracks through areas east of Carlock, and an F1 tornado moved 16.7 miles through Logan and McLean counties. The tornado had a maximum width of 177 yards. A strong F3 tornado tore 18.2 miles across Macon County, heavily damaging 110 homes and killing one person. A multi-vortex tornado destroyed structures on 8 farms near Anchor at F3 intensity, and an F1 tornado moved through land 8.2 miles east of Taylorville. Another F1 tornado tracked across Piatt and Champaign counties, while an F0 briefly touched down northwest of Pierson. An F3 tornado touched down near Tolono, destroying numerous structures and killing one person in Philo. An F3 tornado blew 3 trucks off of Interstate 74 and damaged multiple structures near Ogden. An F2 tornado tracked 7.8 miles through areas north of Bismarck, damaging a high school. An F1 tornado moved 14.8 miles through Coles County, causing an unknown amount of damage.
- July 23, 1975 – 2 separate F3 tornadoes moved through Canton, the first causing an estimated $250,000 (1975 USD) in damages, and the second killed 1+ people white causing $3 million (1975 USD) in damages. Both tornadoes were part of a related family that also produced an F1 tornado in Iowa.
- March 20, 1976 – An F4 tornado moved 63 miles through the Central Illinois counties of Piatt, Champaign, and Vermillion. 10 injuries occurred in Sadorus and Ogden, where members of the public described the tornado's multiple-vortex structure.
- June 13, 1976 – An F4 tornado tracked 8 miles over around one hour across Cook and DuPage counties, mainly affecting Lemont and modern-day Downers Grove, Illinois. The tornado was noted for its erratic path, changing from a southeastern bearing to north to northwest, while being stationary at times. A roof of a reactor building at Argonne National Laboratory was torn off. A total of 2 fatalities and 26 injuries occurred, alongside 13 million dollars (USD, 1976) of damage.

=== 1980–1989 ===
- May 29, 1982 – An F3 tornado tracked 10 miles through Randolph and Perry counties, destroying 4 homes and injuring 7. The tornado caused an estimated $300,000 in damages. A violent F4 tornado moved through Williamson County, killing 10 people and injuring a further 181. The tornado left over 1,000 people homeless. An F0 tornado briefly touched down in Saline County, damaging a barn. Another brief F0 tornado touched down northeast of Carrier Mills, downing power lines.

=== 1990–1999 ===
- August 28, 1990 – An extremely violent and devastating F5 tornado hit Plainfield, killing 29 people and injuring a further 353. The tornado caused an estimated $165 million (1990 USD) in damages, and is the only F5 or EF5 tornado on record to hit the Chicago metropolitan area.
- June 2, 1990 – An F2 tornado tracked 8 miles through Shelby County, destroying 16 homes, damaging a further 60, and injuring 2 people. A brief F0 tornado moved through areas southwest of Arcola, causing no damage. A tornado destroyed a mobile home at F1 intensity north of Casey, and another F1 tornado damaged 6 homes along an 8-mile path through Edgar County. A violent F4 tornado tracked 23 miles through Wayne, Clay and Richland counties, destroying several mobile homes. 2 people were injured by the tornado when a tree fell onto the pickup truck that they were occupying. An F2 tornado moved through Edgar County, destroying three farms before crossing the state line into Indiana. This is the first tornado since 1959 to cross Illinois state lines. Another F2 tornado followed a similar path, damaging up to 20 homes before crossing into Illinois. An F4 tornado tore 12.5 miles through the Newton area, destroying 9 buildings and causing minor damage to several others. An extremely long-tracked and violent F4 tornado touched down in Hamilton County, before moving across the county line into Wayne County, and later Edwards and Wabash counties before crossing into Indiana. The tornado killed one person, injured 11 others, and caused an estimated $10 million (1990 USD) in damages, particularly to Daviess County, Indiana. A relatively brief tornado inflicted F1 damage to grain-storage silos in the Oblong area. A brief F0 tornado touched down south of Palestine, causing no damage. An F2 tornado moved across Lawrence County, destroying a farm and mobile home. A man was injured by the tornado when a tractor lofted by the tornado fell onto his leg.
- May 9, 1995 – An F0 tornado briefly touched down near Alexander, causing no damage, and another brief F0 damaged 2 homes in Morgan County. A destructive F3 tornado tracked across Sangamon, Menard, Logan and DeWitt counties, destroying 4 homes and damaging up to 100 more. An F0 tornado briefly touched down in Bureau County, and a tornado damaged 2 farmhouses at F3 intensity south of Rapids City. An F0 tornado touched down west of Cuba, causing no damage. Another F0 tornado tracked 3 miles through Fulton County, downing power lines and ending a communications tower. An F0 tornado briefly touched down in Henry County, flipping a mobile home. A strong F3 tornado tracked 22 miles through Bureau and Lee counties, destroying a multi-story farmhouse. Another F3 tornado touched down near Albany, before tearing across Whiteside and Carroll counties. The tornado destroyed 40 structures, including 36 farmhouses, and heavily damaged multiple others. An F1 tornado destroyed several structures in Tazewell County, and an F0 tornado briefly touched down east of Harmon. An F0 tornado touched down near Walshville, and another F0 tornado inflicted minimal damage to structures northwest of Hahnaman. A brief F0 tornado moved 0.2 miles through Montgomery County. An F1 tornado tracked 12 miles through De Witt and McLean counties, destroying numerous structures and damaging 3 homes. Another F1 tornado moved across Montgomery County, damaging multiple outbuildings. An F1 tornado destroyed 2 mobile homes southeast of Oconee, and a tornado inflicted F0-leveled damage to trees and foliage southwest of Saybrook. An F1 tornado tracked 3 miles across McLean County, damaging 5 homes and destroying multiple outbuildings. An F0 tornado touched down in Shelby County, destroying 3 barns, and an F1 tornado moved 5 miles through the Thawville area, damaging a brick home and 2 farms.
- May 13, 1995 – A long-tracked and violent F4 tornado tore across Hancock, Henderson and Warren counties, destroying several structures and damaged a school. An F2 tornado moved across Knox County, destroying 18 homes and heavily damaging or uprooting an estimated 1,200 trees located on an orchard farm. A relatively brief but violent F4 tornado touched down near Lewistown, destroying 12 homes and tossing a car more than 100 yards into a field. 45 people were injured by the tornado. An F3 tornado tracked through Mason and Tazewell counties, damaging or destroying 61 homes. A tornado inflicted F1 damage to 4 homes in the Princeville area, and an F0 tornado briefly touched down in Peoria County. An F0 tornado damaged a home and deroofed a mobile home in Woodford County, and another F0 tornado briefly touched down near Carlock, damaging multiple structures, including 2 homes. An F1 tornado tracked 4 miles through McLean County, destroying 1 home and damaging 1 others. The tornado also destroyed multiple grain bins. An F0 tornado briefly touched down northwest of Papineau, damaging several barns.
- May 18, 1995 – An F1 tornado hit the Waterloo area, damaging several homes and deroofing a building. A strong F2 tornado moved across 4 miles southwest of Wartburg, damaging a multi-story brick home and destroying multiple farm buildings. An F1 tornado damaged at least 6 structures along a 4.5-mile track through Monroe County, and an F0 tornado damaged 20 buildings southeast of Waterloo. An F2 tornado tracked through areas east of Burksville, damaging 5 homes. An F0 tornado damaged an outbuilding in St. Clair County, and an F1 tornado damaged 7 structures southwest of Hecker. An F0 tornado moved across St. Clair and Washington counties, and another F0 tornado touched down east of Tilden. An F0 tornado moved 3.5 miles across Randolph County, causing an unknown amount of damage. An F0 tornado touched down east of Plum Hill, and an F1 tornado damaged several structures and destroyed a radio tower along an 18-mile track across Washington County. A brief F0 tornado touched down in Jefferson County, causing no damage, and an F1 tornado briefly touched down southwest of Patton, damaging 3 homes.
- April 19, 1996 – 2 separate and brief F0 tornadoes touched down in Coles County, causing no damage. Twin F0 and F1 tornadoes moved through Edgar County, damaging several structures. An F1 10 tornado moved through the Rutland area, damaging a home. A brief F0 tornado touched down southwest of Winchester, causing a tree to fall onto a car. Another brief F0 tornado damaged trees along a 1-mile track northeast of Valmeyer, and another F0 tornado caused minor damage to areas west of Raritan. A strong F2 tornado tracked 9 miles through Mason County, blowing a semi-truck off of a road and injuring one person. An F1 tornado damaged 15 houses in Henderson County, and a tornado inflicted F0-leveled damage to a church near Brimfield. An F1 tornado destroyed 2 homes and damaged 5 other in Easton, and an F2 tornado destroyed a home and damaged a prison east of Jacksonville. An F0 tornado downed power lines in Freeburg, and another F0 tornado inflicted minimal damage to farm buildings north of Dickeys. A brief F0 tornado touched down in Morgan County, and another F0 tornado damaged 5 structures northeast of New Berlin and blew over 2 semi-trucks on Interstate 72. An F3 tornado destroyed a church and damaged 15 homes east of Armington, and a brief tornado destroyed trees at F0 intensity in Randolph County. A relatively brief but strong F3 tornado damaged an estimated 150 homes along a 3.5-mile track across Henry County. 4 people were injured by the tornado. A brief F0 tornado damaged 2 homes in Momence, and another F0 tornado damaged a cemetery in Galva. A strong F3 tornado tracked 14.5 miles through Macon County, destroying up to 10 homes and damaging several other structures, including a school gymnasium. 29 people were injured in Decatur, and the tornado caused an estimated $9 million (1996 USD) in damages. A strong F2 tornado destroyed over 10 structures in Salem, and damaged over 46 homes. The tornado injured 7 people and caused around $7 million (1996 USD) in damages. An F0 tornado briefly touched down in Tiskilwa, downing a utility pole. A brief F1 tornado destroyed a grain bin in Piatt County, and an F0 tornado downed power lines southwest of Baldwin. An F1 tornado destroyed 2 homes and damaged several aircraft at an airport south of Monticello, and another F1 tornado destroyed a farmhouse and barn in Greendale. The tornado also damaged trees and knocked down power lines. An F0 tornado briefly touched down south of Tilden, downing power lines, and another F0 tornado damaged barns and homes in Randolph County. An F1 tornado moved 2.5 miles across Perry and Franklin counties, damaging a home and flipping a tractor trailer. A tornado destroyed three barns and a home in Vernon at F1 intensity, and a strong F3 tornado destroyed an estimated 33 homes in Urbana. Damage from the tornado totaled $9 million (1996 USD), and 12 people were injured. A brief but intense F3 tornado hit Ogden, destroying 88 homes, 12 businesses and 3 churches. 179 other homes were damaged to varying degrees, and a woman was killed when the semi-truck she was occupying was hit by the tornado while driving long Interstate 74. 13 others were injured by the tornado. An F0 tornado briefly touched down northwest of Catlin, causing no damage. An F3 tornado moved through Jefferson, Hamilton and Wayne counties, destroying 3 homes and damaging 50 others in Piopolis. An F1 tornado touched down north of Carmi, destroying 8 aircraft and damaging a church, and an F2 tornado damaged 400 homes in Zion, injuring 2 people.
- April 15, 1998 – A brief F0 tornado touched down north of Hoopole, and another brief F0 tornado touched down west of Viola. An F0 tornado touched down in Red Bud, causing no damage. Another F0 tornado briefly moved through areas south of Marissa, destroying bleachers located at a baseball field. An F0 tornado briefly touched down in Washington County, and a tornado was videotaped inflicting F0-leveled damage to a field northeast of Coulterville. An F0 tornado destroyed trees and flipped an ambulance along a 15-mile track across Monroe and St. Clair counties. A brief F1 tornado destroyed several barns east of Hoyleton, and an F2 tornado destroyed multiple barns and damaged 9 homes in Jefferson and Marion counties. A man was injured when his tractor was tossed by the tornado. Another F2 tornado damaged 10 homes northeast of Walnut Hill, and an F1 tornado damaged 8 homes and damaged several barns along a 9-mile path in Marion County. An F2 tornado damaged up to 100 buildings in Clay County, injuring 8 people, and another F2 tornado tracked 16 miles through Clay and Richland counties, destroying a mobile home. An F0 tornado briefly touched down in Jackson County, causing no damage, and another F0 tornado briefly touched down southwest of De Soto.
- May 5, 1999 – A brief F1 tornado touched down east of Kell, destroying a mobile home and injuring the 4 occupants.

=== 2000–2009 ===
- April 27, 2002 – A brief F1 tornado touched down in St. Clair County, damaging 32 homes and an elementary school. Another F1 tornado destroyed several structures and injured 2 people east of Kenner. An F2 tornado tracked 7.5 miles through Galatia, damaging or destroying at least 55 structures. 2 people were injured when a trailer that they were occupying was flipped. A long-tracked and intense tornado moved across Union and Johnson counties, destroying 75 homes in Dongola and killing one person. The tornado injured 10 others along its 19-mile path. An F2 tornado destroyed a brick building northwest of Ganntown, injuring 2 people. An F3 tornado touched down in Pope County, destroying large swaths of trees before crossing the state line into Kentucky.
- May 4, 2003 – An F1 tornado touched down in Kentucky, before crossing the state line into Massac County, downing power lines and damaging trailers. Twin tornadoes touched down in Pope County, inflicting F1-leveled tree damage before crossing into Kentucky and lifting a short time later.
- May 6, 2003 – An F1 tornado tracked 4 miles through Monroe County, uprooting trees and damaging a home. Another F1 tornado moved through areas southeast of Red Bud, heavily damaging a home and destroying multiple trees. A storm chaser reported a brief F0 tornado in Walsh, and another brief F0 tornado damaged trees near Miller City. 'A violent tornado tracked 33 miles across Pulaski, Massac and Pope counties, destroying 51 homes at F4 intensity and killing 2 people. A brief F0 tornado damaged trees south of Cypress, and a strong F2 tornado touched down in Alexander County before crossing the state line into Missouri, destroying at least one home and injuring a child occupying it. A brief F0 tornado downed trees in Johnson County, and another brief F0 tornado touched down in Massac County. An F2 tornado tracked 4 miles through areas northwest of Metropolis, damaging several structures and downing power lines.
- May 8, 2003 – A brief F0 tornado touched down west of Staunton, and another brief F0 tornado touched down south of Oskaloosa.
- May 9, 2003 – A tornado inflicted F0-leveled damage to multiple homes and blew over a semi-truck in Sangamon County.
- July 13, 2004 – A violent F4 tornado moved west of Roanoke, injuring 3 and completely destroying a parts supplier factory for Caterpillar Inc.

=== 2010–2019 ===
- November 17, 2013 – An unusual powerful EF4 tornado moved through Washington and several farmsteads in rural central Illinois, in the county of Tazewell. The tornado killed 3 and injured 125 others.
- April 9, 2015 – A violent EF4 tornado moved through Ogle County, directly impacting the communities of Rochelle and Fairdale, killing 2 and injuring 22 others. It was the strongest tornado to occur in northern Illinois in 25 years.

=== 2020–present ===
- June 20, 2021 – An EF3 tornado struck the Chicago suburbs of Naperville and Woodridge, damaging hundreds of structures, downing thousands of trees, and injuring 11 people. Two EF0 tornadoes were also reported near Romeoville and Addison.
- March 31 – April 1, 2023 – An EF1 tornado struck the Apollo Theatre in Belvidere, causing the collapse of the structure onto a concert with 260 onsite. 40 were injured and 1 died. An EF3 tornado would produce EF3 damage in Illinois before crossing state lines into Indiana, where three would die.
- August 5, 2023 – A relatively brief EF2 tornado tracked 2.87 miles through areas near Marcelline, damaging numerous homes and downing power lines. A tornado briefly inflicted EF0-leveled damage in Jackson County, and another EF0 was observed in Jasper County.
- August 6, 2023 – A multi-vortex EFU tornado moved 8 miles through Hancock County, causing no damage, while a strong EF2 tornado damaged several homes north of Pawnee.
- March 10, 2026 - A large and long tracked EF3 tornado touchdown in Kankakee. This tornado caused significant damage in Aroma Park and various other areas. This tornado tracked into Indiana before lifting. This tornado killed 3 people. This supercell produced multiple other tornadoes and giant hail.

== See also ==
- Tornadoes in Chicago
- List of North American tornadoes and tornado outbreaks

== Cited works ==
- Grazulis, Thomas P. (May 1984). Violent Tornado Climatography, 1880–1982. OSTI (Technical report). NUREG. Washington, D.C.: Nuclear Regulatory Commission. OSTI 7099491. CR-3670.
- Grazulis, Thomas (1997), Significant Tornadoes Update, 1992–1995, St. Johnsbury, Vermont: Environmental Films, ISBN 978-1879362048
- Holcomb, E. W. (March 1942). Written at Springfield, Illinois. "Tornadoes of March 16, 1942". Illinois section. Climatological Data. Illinois. 47 (3). Asheville, North Carolina: National Climatic Data Center: 13. Archived from the original on April 16, 2014.
- National Weather Service (April 1954). Storm Data Publication (Report). National Centers for Environmental Information. Archived from the original on April 7, 2012 – via Storm Events Database.
- National Weather Service (December 1957). Storm Data Publication (Report). National Centers for Environmental Information – via Storm Events Database.
- National Weather Service (January 1967). Storm Data Publication (Report). National Centers for Environmental Information. Archived from the original on April 7, 2012 – via Storm Events Database.
- U.S. Weather Bureau (January 1967). "Storm Data and Unusual Weather Phenomena". Storm Data. 9 (1). Asheville, North Carolina: National Climatic Data Center.
- U.S. Weather Bureau (December 1957). "Storm data and unusual weather phenomena". Climatological Data National Summary. 8 (12). Asheville, North Carolina: National Climatic Data Center: 522–531. Archived from the original on April 16, 2014.
- Mason, Angela (2011). Death Rides the Sky: The Story of the 1925 Tri-State Tornado. Rockford, IL: Black Oak Media. ISBN 978-1-61876-001-2.
- "Storm Data and Unusual Weather Phenomena". Storm Data. 16 (4). Asheville, North Carolina: National Oceanic and Atmospheric Administration: 10. April 1974.
- U.S. Weather Bureau (September 1927). "Severe local storms, September 1927". Monthly Weather Review. 55 (9). Boston: American Meteorological Society: 424. Bibcode:1927MWRv...55..424.. doi:10.1175/1520-0493(1927)55<424:SLSS>2.0.CO;2.
- Brooks, Harold E.; Doswell III, Charles A. (February 2001). "Normalized Damage from Major Tornadoes in the United States: 1890–1999". Weather and Forecasting. 16 (1). American Meteorological Society: 168–76. Bibcode:2001WtFor..16..168B. doi:10.1175/1520-0434(2001)016<0168:NDFMTI>2.0.CO;2.
