= Tornado outbreak sequence of December 18–20, 1957 =

Tornado outbreak in the United States

- A photograph of the ruins of the George Butcher Home in Murphysboro, Illinois. Here, a woman and three children were killed.

Meteorological history
- Formed: December 18, 1957
- Dissipated: December 20, 1957

Tornado outbreak
- Tornadoes: 37 confirmed
- Max. rating: F5 tornado
- Duration: 1 day and 14 1/2 hours
- Highest gusts: 53 kn (61 mph; 98 km/h) (estimated) in Hannibal, Missouri, on December 18
- Largest hail: 1 1/4 in (3.2 cm) in diameter in Missouri on December 18

Overall effects
- Fatalities: 19
- Injuries: 291
- Damage: $15,855,000 (1957 USD) (Note: All losses are in 1957 USD unless otherwise noted.) $182 million (2025 USD)
- Areas affected: Midwestern and Southern United States, especially eastern Missouri and Southern Illinois
- Part of the tornado outbreaks of 1957

On December 18–20, 1957, a significant tornado outbreak sequence affected the southern Midwest and the South of the contiguous United States. The outbreak sequence began on the afternoon of December 18, when a low-pressure area approached the southern portions of Missouri and Illinois. Supercells developed and proceeded eastward at horizontal speeds of 40 to 45 miles per hour (64 to 72 km/h), yielding what was considered the most severe tornado outbreak in Illinois on record so late in the calendar year. Total losses in the state were estimated to fall within the range of $8–$10 million. (Note: An outbreak is generally defined as a group of at least six tornadoes (the number sometimes varies slightly according to local climatology) with no more than a six-hour gap between individual tornadoes. An outbreak sequence, prior to (after) the start of modern records in 1950, is defined as a period of no more than two (one) consecutive days without at least one significant (F2 or stronger) tornado.) (Note: The Fujita scale was devised under the aegis of scientist T. Theodore Fujita in the early 1970s. Prior to the advent of the scale in 1971, tornadoes in the United States were officially unrated. While the Fujita scale has been superseded by the Enhanced Fujita scale in the U.S. since February 1, 2007, Canada used the old scale until April 1, 2013; nations elsewhere, like the United Kingdom, apply other classifications such as the TORRO scale.) (Note: Historically, the number of tornadoes globally and in the United States was and is likely underrepresented: research by Grazulis on annual tornado activity suggests that, as of 2001, only 53% of yearly U.S. tornadoes were officially recorded. Documentation of tornadoes outside the United States was historically less exhaustive, owing to the lack of monitors in many nations and, in some cases, to internal political controls on public information. Most countries only recorded tornadoes that produced severe damage or loss of life. Significant low biases in U.S. tornado counts likely occurred through the early 1990s, when advanced NEXRAD was first installed and the National Weather Service began comprehensively verifying tornado occurrences.)

== Background ==
At 6:00 a.m. CST (12:00 UTC) on December 18, 1957, a vigorous shortwave trough entered the Great Plains with a cold front moving east across Oklahoma and Kansas. A dissipating stationary front over Oklahoma underwent frontolysis and later redeveloped as a warm front which extended across central Illinois. By 3:00 pm. CST (21:00 UTC), surface dew points reached the low 60s °F across portions of southeast Missouri and southern Illinois, including the St. Louis area. Although most areas were then recording overcast weather conditions, a strong upper-level jet stream helped impart synoptic-scale lifting, a factor that favors updrafts, and little vertical mixing occurred, so instability remained favorable for thunderstorm development. Additionally, very cold temperatures following a surface cyclone raised the lifted index to −6 due to high adiabatic lapse rates. Wind speeds at the middle level of the atmosphere, just under 6 kilometres (3.7 mi) from the ground, were close to 70 mph (110 km/h) as well. Conditions were therefore very conducive to a large tornado outbreak on the afternoon of December 18.

Similarly favorable conditions occurred a day later, as a warm and moist air mass spread northward from the Gulf of Mexico. In fact, temperatures in the Mississippi Valley and the upper Midwest approached record highs for December. St. Louis and Detroit, recorded afternoon highs of 57 °F (14 °C), while Chicago measured 56 °F (13 °C), only eight degrees lower than the local record high for December 19. Local residents and meteorologists described temperatures as being "springlike" for the time of year, even though astronomical winter was due to begin on December 23. Farther south, temperatures along the Gulf Coast reached the low 70s °F. Just as on December 18, a second tornado outbreak occurred in a broad warm sector from Arkansas to Illinois and south to Alabama.

== Confirmed tornadoes ==
Impacts by state
State	Deaths	Injuries	Damage	Ref
Alabama	0	7	$	
Arkansas	2	9	$	
Illinois	13	269	$	
Missouri	4	4	$	
Tennessee	0	2	$	
Total	19	291	$15,855,000	

Confirmed tornadoes by Fujita rating
FU	F0	F1	F2	F3	F4	F5	Total
0	0	8	16	9	3	1	37

=== December 18 event ===
Confirmed tornadoes – Wednesday, December 18, 1957 (Note: All dates are based on the local time zone where the tornado touched down; however, all times are in Coordinated Universal Time and dates are split at midnight CST/CDT for consistency.) (Note: Prior to 1994, only the average widths of tornado paths were officially listed.)
F#	Location	County / Parish	State	Start coord.	Time (UTC)	Path length	Max. width	Summary
F1	WSW of Truxton	Lincoln	MO	39.00°N 91.25°W	18:30–?	0.3 miles (0.48 km)	100 yards (91 m)	Brief tornado unroofed three homes, one of which it dislodged, injuring a woman inside. Losses totaled $25,000. Tornado researcher Thomas P. Grazulis classified the tornado as an F2.
F2	ENE of Knob Lick to WSW of Libertyville	St. Francois	MO	37.68°N 90.35°W	19:50–?	2.7 miles (4.3 km)	33 yards (30 m)	1 death – Tornado leveled barns and silos in its path through three farms north of Fredericktown, destroying a home and killing an infant inside. One person was injured and losses totaled $25,000. Grazulis classified the tornado as an F3.
F3	SE of Diamond Cross to NE of Conant	Randolph, Perry	IL	37.97°N 89.82°W	20:40–?	20.2 miles (32.5 km)	33 yards (30 m)	Intense tornado produced intermittent damage near Chester, Steeleville, Cutler, Jamestown, and Conant. Tornado affected 10 farmsteads, destroyed one home, and damaged numerous buildings. Losses totaled $25,000.
F2	ESE of McBride	Perry	MO	37.83°N 89.83°W	21:00–?	0.5 miles (0.80 km)	50 yards (46 m)	Strong tornado momentarily lifted, set down, and shifted an occupied elementary school, but none of the 32 students in attendance was injured. Tornado also destroyed or damaged 15–20 structures on farms, including a number of barns. Losses totaled $250,000.
F3	SE of Chester to NW of Denmark	Randolph, Perry	IL	37.90°N 89.80°W	21:15–?	17.7 miles (28.5 km)	33 yards (30 m)	Tornado destroyed or damaged at least 24 homes in Willisville, along with the local brick high school. Losses totaled $250,000.
F2	Northern Roxana	Madison	IL	38.85°N 90.08°W	21:20–?	1 mile (1.6 km)	33 yards (30 m)	Intense, brief tornado may have first touched down near Florissant, Missouri, before destroying or damaging nine buildings on the southern outskirts of Wood River. One person was injured and losses totaled $25,000. Grazulis classified the tornado as an F3.
F1	Mason City	Mason	IL	40.20°N 89.70°W	21:35–?	0.1 miles (0.16 km)	33 yards (30 m)	Brief tornado caused minimal damage to three or four buildings. One person was injured and losses totaled $25,000.
F3	NNE of Cutler	Perry	IL	38.08°N 89.55°W	21:35–?	2.5 miles (4.0 km)	33 yards (30 m)	Tornado destroyed or damaged six homes near the Illinois Routes 154–150 crossroads. Cars were blown off the highways and destroyed. One person was injured and losses totaled $250,000.
F2	NW of Boyd to SSE of Dix	Jefferson	IL	38.42°N 89.02°W	21:45–?	4.5 miles (7.2 km)	33 yards (30 m)	Tornado unroofed or extensively damaged eight structures. Two people were injured and losses totaled $25,000. Tornado may have dissipated near Kell.
F4	S of Roaches to NNE of Marlow	Jefferson	IL	38.28°N 89.08°W	21:55–22:10	16.8 miles (27.0 km)	250 yards (230 m)	1 death – See section on this tornado – 45 people were injured and losses totaled $2.5 million.
F2	NNW of Ava to ENE of Sato	Jackson	IL	37.90°N 89.50°W	22:00–?	5.4 miles (8.7 km)	33 yards (30 m)	Tornado damaged three or four properties. Losses totaled $25,000. Grazulis did not list the event as an F2 or stronger.
F3	ESE of Belgique, MO to WNW of Degognia, IL	Randolph	IL	37.83°N 89.75°W	22:15–?	5.7 miles (9.2 km)	33 yards (30 m)	Tornado passed near Rockwood, Illinois, flipping freight cars and damaging nearby buildings. Losses totaled $25,000. Grazulis did not list the event as an F2 or stronger.
F2	E of Woodlawn to ENE of Camp Ground	Jefferson	IL	38.33°N 89.02°W	22:30–?	11.6 miles (18.7 km)	200 yards (180 m)	Tornado impacted the northernmost outskirts of Mount Vernon as it damaged 12 structures. Losses totaled $25,000. Grazulis classified the tornado as an F3.
F5	NNW of Sunfield to ESE of Tamaroa	Perry	IL	38.08°N 89.25°W	22:35–?	5.4 miles (8.7 km)	200 yards (180 m)	1 death – See section on this tornado – Six people were injured.
F2	E of Scopus to NE of Pocahontas	Cape Girardeau	MO	37.40°N 89.87°W	22:45–22:55	15.8 miles (25.4 km)	700 yards (640 m)	Intense tornado passed near Millersville, Oak Ridge, and Highway 61, affecting five farmsteads, one of which lost its farmhouse and all barns. One person was injured and losses totaled $250,000. Grazulis classified the tornado as an F3.
F4	Gorham to Plumfield	Jackson, Williamson, Franklin	IL	37.70°N 89.48°W	22:45–23:05	28.3 miles (45.5 km)	300 yards (270 m)	11 deaths – See section on this tornado – 200 people were injured and losses totaled $7.5 million.
F2	N of Altenburg	Perry	MO	37.68°N 89.58°W	23:00–?	1 mile (1.6 km)	10 yards (9.1 m)	Brief tornado destroyed a home near Altenburg. Losses totaled $25,000. Grazulis classified the tornado as a high-end F3.
F3	ESE of Orchardville to Southern Clay City	Wayne, Clay	IL	38.50°N 88.63°W	23:00–?	19.6 miles (31.5 km)	200 yards (180 m)	Tornado, its trajectory varying from east-northeast to northeast, destroyed or damaged structures on 20 farmsteads. One person was injured and losses totaled $500,000. Another, unconfirmed tornado may have hit the same area at 22:30 UTC.
F2	Chaffee	Scott	MO	37.18°N 89.67°W	23:22–?	0.5 miles (0.80 km)	33 yards (30 m)	3 deaths – One or more tornadoes, possibly paralleling each other, destroyed or unroofed a shoe factory, businesses, and homes. All fatalities occurred in a small home. At least one person—possibly three others—was injured and losses totaled $2.5 million.
F2	Carbondale	Jackson	IL	37.70°N 89.22°W	23:25–?	1.5 miles (2.4 km)	33 yards (30 m)	Tornado touched down near Southern Illinois University, destroying 15 trailers and damaging three other homes. Five people were injured and losses totaled $2,500. Grazulis did not list the tornado as an F2 or stronger.
F3	W of Ste. Marie to ESE of Willow Hill	Jasper	IL	38.93°N 88.05°W	23:25–?	4.5 miles (7.2 km)	33 yards (30 m)	Tornado damaged four farmsteads and destroyed one or more barns in a limited area between Boos and Ste. Marie. Losses totaled $25,000.
F3	Southeastern Dahlgren	Hamilton	IL	38.20°N 88.70°W	23:35–?	2.5 miles (4.0 km)	150 yards (140 m)	Tornado destroyed or extensively damaged several homes. Tornado may have formed from the same supercell as the Sunfield F5. Three people were injured and losses totaled $250,000.
F3	SW of Springerton to NW of Grayville	Hamilton, White, Edwards	IL	38.17°N 88.42°W	00:00–?	19.8 miles (31.9 km)	33 yards (30 m)	Tornado affected 20 farmsteads, destroying four or more barns and a home. Four people were injured and losses totaled $250,000.
F2	Forman	Johnson	IL	37.30°N 88.92°W	00:00–?	0.1 miles (0.16 km)	33 yards (30 m)	Tornado destroyed one church and struck a school and two farms. Two tornadoes were probably involved but the event is not officially listed as such. Losses totaled $25,000.
F1	SE of Sidell to W of Indianola	Vermilion	IL	39.90°N 87.80°W	00:40–?	3 miles (4.8 km)	60 yards (55 m)	This tornado was apparently heard to produce a "'roaring'" noise with minimal damage.

=== December 19 event ===
Confirmed tornadoes – Thursday, December 19, 1957
F#	Location	County / Parish	State	Start coord.	Time (UTC)	Path length	Max. width	Summary
F4	E of Waldo to N of Stephens	Columbia, Ouachita	AR	33.35°N 93.25°W	18:44–?	17.7 miles (28.5 km)	33 yards (30 m)	2 deaths – This violent tornado produced F4 damage as it touched down at "Cotton Belt", a community between Waldo and McNeil. There, five homes were levelled and a boy killed and thrown 250 yd (750 ft) from his home. Elsewhere, the tornado damaged five other homes. The tornado also threw and rolled a car 600 yd (0.34 mi) just before dissipating, having caused nine injuries and destroyed eight buildings.
F1	S of Milan	Gibson	TN	35.87°N 88.75°W	21:00–?	0.1 miles (0.16 km)	7 yards (6.4 m)	A brief tornado destroyed four tenant homes on a farm in the Sitka community, south of Milan.
F3	Sherrill to SE of Tucker	Jefferson	AR	34.38°N 91.95°W	21:40–?	3.8 miles (6.1 km)	100 yards (91 m)	This intense tornado affected two farmsteads and struck the Tucker State Prison Farm.
F2	SE of Golden City	Dade	MO	37.37°N 94.07°W	22:10–22:15	6.6 miles (10.6 km)	100 yards (91 m)	This tornado intermittently damaged five farmsteads. The tornado alternately lifted and touched down, and a number of funnel clouds were reported, so more than one tornado may have been involved. Grazulis did not list this tornado as an F2 or stronger.
F2	Waltonville	Jefferson	IL	38.20°N 89.05°W	23:50–?	1 mile (1.6 km)	67 yards (61 m)	This tornado extensively damaged one farm and caused lesser damage to a number of structures. Grazulis did not list this tornado as an F2 or stronger.
F2	Pankeyville	Saline	IL	37.70°N 88.53°W	03:00–?	0.5 miles (0.80 km)	100 yards (91 m)	A tornado damaged a barn and other buildings south of Harrisburg. Grazulis did not list this tornado as an F2 or stronger.
F2	Humboldt	Gibson	TN	35.82°N 88.92°W	03:15–?	0.5 miles (0.80 km)	10 yards (9.1 m)	A hotel and the local city hall were partially or entirely unroofed. Four tenant homes, a warehouse, and a CBS-built garage were wrecked. A cotton gin and a building sustained damage, the latter of which was also shifted and twisted. Electrical wires and TV antennae were downed as well. Flying debris damaged numerous structures.
F1	Milan	Gibson	TN	35.92°N 88.75°W	03:20–?	0.1 miles (0.16 km)	7 yards (6.4 m)	This tornado, the second to hit the Milan area on December 19, damaged roofs, windows, and antennae. Flying debris injured two people. The tornado may have originated from the same storm as the previous event.
F1	S of Winfield	Fayette	AL	33.87°N 87.80°W	04:30–?	0.1 miles (0.16 km)	33 yards (30 m)	This brief tornado destroyed a home and several outbuildings.
F2	Littleville	Colbert	AL	34.60°N 87.67°W	05:15–?	0.1 miles (0.16 km)	33 yards (30 m)	This tornado destroyed or damaged fifteen homes, seven businesses, and the local city hall. Damage neared F3-level intensity. Seven people were injured.

=== December 20 event ===
Confirmed tornadoes – Friday, December 20, 1957
F#	Location	County / Parish	State	Start coord.	Time (UTC)	Path length	Max. width	Summary
F1	Clanton	Chilton	AL	32.80°N 86.65°W	08:53–?	0.1 miles (0.16 km)	33 yards (30 m)	This tornado unroofed or extensively damaged twenty to thirty-five homes, three of which were destroyed, and a cotton mill. Grazulis classified the tornado as an F2.
F1	E of Castleberry	Conecuh	AL	31.30°N 86.88°W	09:00–?	0.8 miles (1.3 km)	33 yards (30 m)	This tornado damaged two areas about 1/2 mi (0.80 km) apart. It destroyed two homes and one barn. Grazulis classified the tornado as an F2.

=== Mount Vernon, Illinois ===
Mount Vernon, Illinois
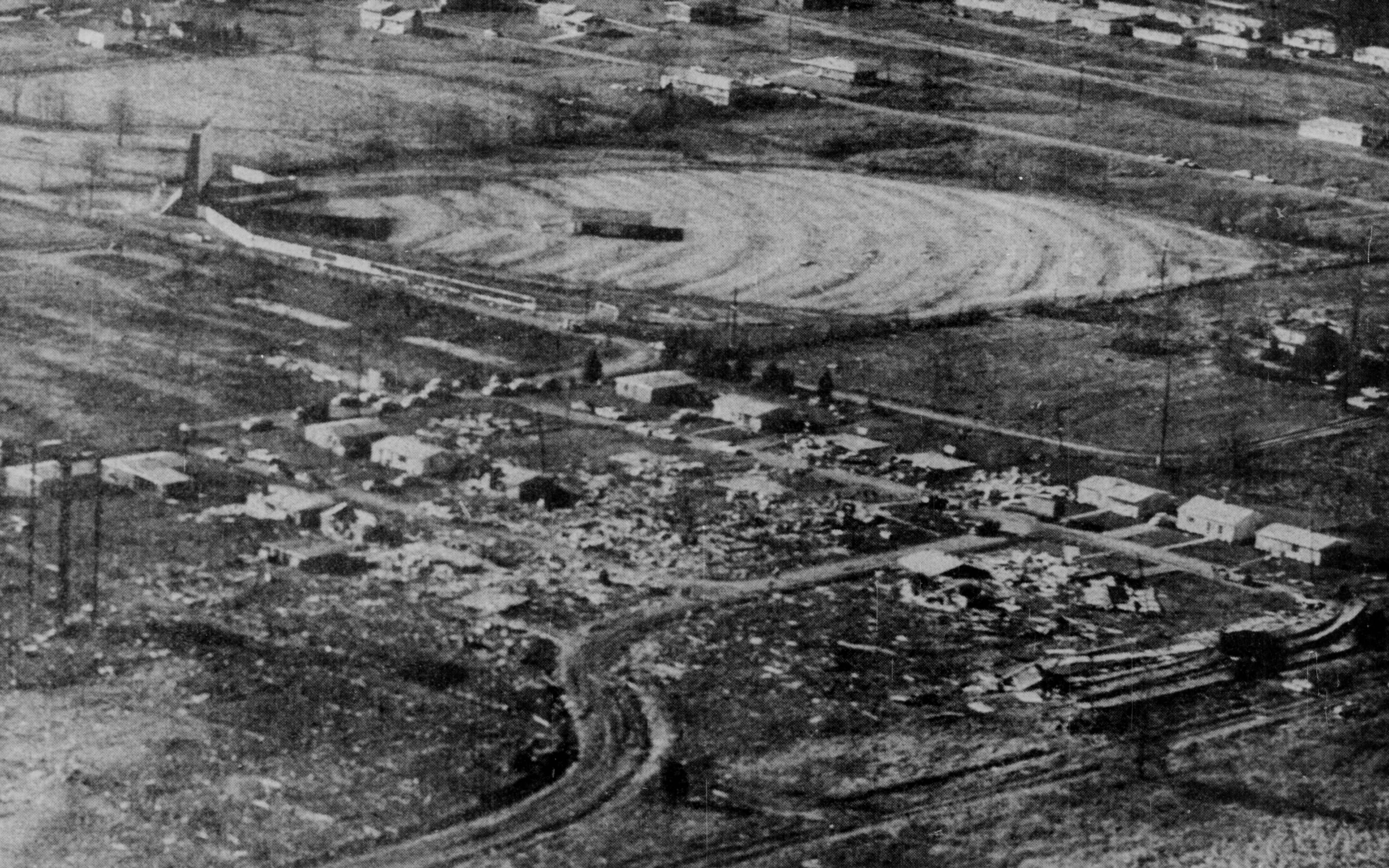
- An aerial photo of a subdivision in Mount Vernon after the tornado.

Meteorological history
- Date: December 18, 1957

F4 tornado
- on the Fujita scale

Overall effects
- Fatalities: 1
- Injuries: 45

The second deadly tornado to develop on December 18 became one of two tornadoes to strike Mount Vernon in Jefferson County, Illinois. The first tornado was the strongest and formed at 3:55 pm. CST (21:55 UTC) about 10 mi (16 km) west-southwest of downtown Mount Vernon, whence local police monitored its movement from patrol vehicles and disseminated reports via radio. As the tornado approached downtown Mount Vernon, it completely levelled small, "prefabricated", ranch-style homes in southwest Mount Vernon; damage in this area was later rated F4 by meteorologists, though on the low end of the category. Thereafter, the tornado weakened as it neared downtown Mount Vernon and may have even dissipated before reforming as a separate tornado to the north. It then continued on a skipping path and caused less severe damage to older homesites northeast of Mount Vernon. In Mount Vernon, the tornado damaged or destroyed about fifteen to twenty buildings, including the Block Grade School, where students left only half an hour beforehand. The funnel was described as being "swirling black clouds", filled with debris, that vanished northwest of downtown Mount Vernon. The tornado was up to 250 yd (230 m) wide at times.

=== Sunfield, Illinois ===
Sunfield, Illinois
- An aerial view of severe damage in Sunfield in the aftermath of the tornado

Meteorological history
- Formed: December 18, 1957, 4:35 p.m. CST (UTC−06:00)

F5 tornado
- on the Fujita scale
- Highest winds: >261 mph (420 km/h)

Overall effects
- Fatalities: 3
- Injuries: 6
- Damage: $250,000–$500,000 (1957 USD)

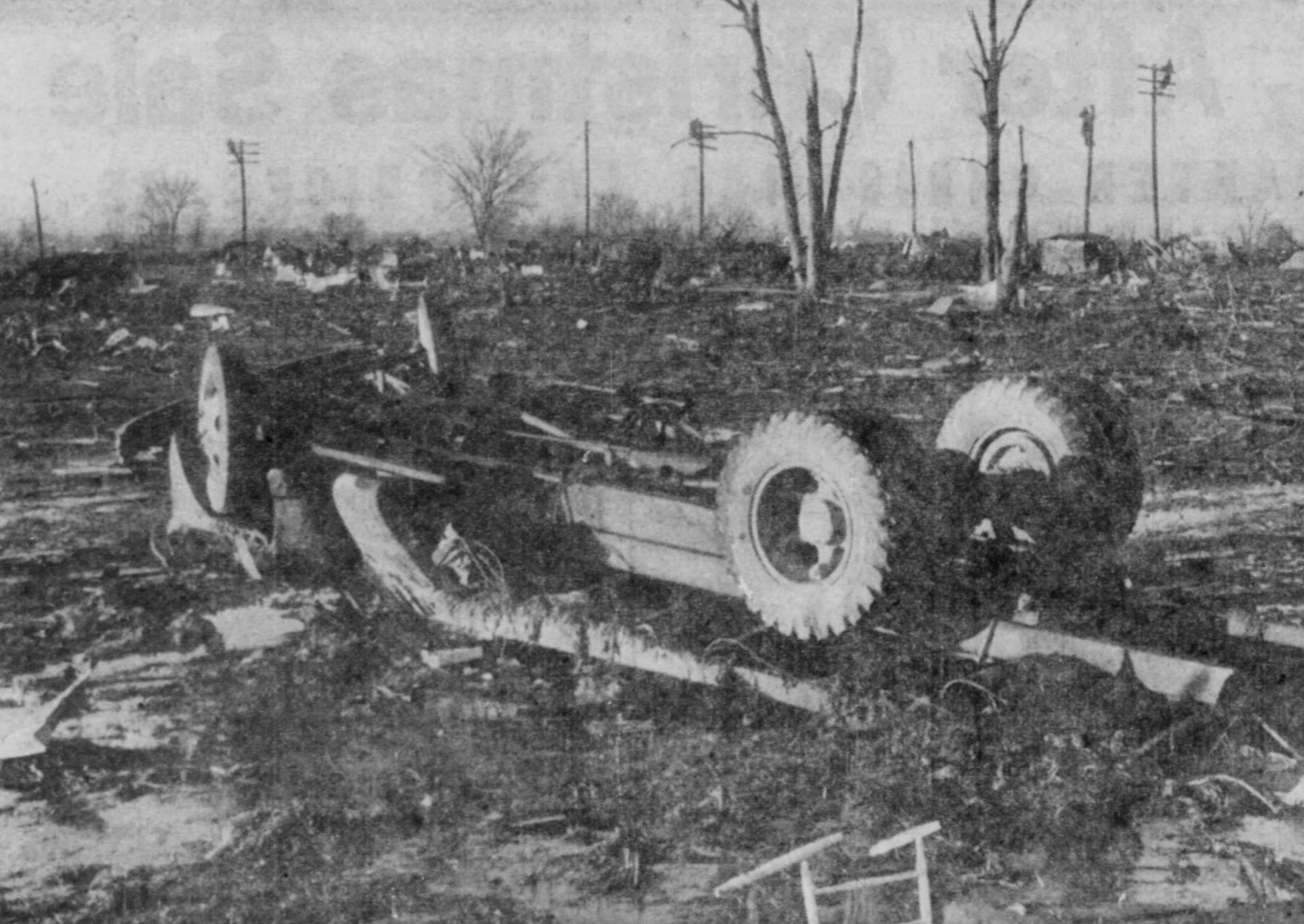
A truck that was thrown 150 yd (140 m) by the tornado

This violent tornado struck Sunfield, Illinois, completely wiping out the community on December 18. The extreme damage in Sunfield caused the National Weather Service to assign a rating of F5 on the Fujita scale.

The east-northeastward moving tornado struck Sunfield at the junction of U.S. Route 51 and Illinois Route 154, also called the Sunfield Y or Wye on account of the branching shape of the intersection. The United States Weather Bureau documented "very heavy destruction", albeit in a small area, and referred to the Sunfield Y as having been "wiped out". Tornado expert Thomas P. Grazulis stated that the “entire community literally vanished.” Several people survived the tornado by taking cover in buildings, including some which were destroyed. A man who remained outside was killed, later found in a drainage ditch by the road. In total, the tornado killed three people, injured six others, and caused between $250,000 to $500,000 (1957 USD) in damage.

The United States Weather Bureau documented that the tornado reached a maximum width of 200 yards (180 m) and traveled 5 miles (8.0 km). They also documented that the tornado caused between $50,000 to $500,000 (1957 USD) in damage. After the creation of the Fujita scale in 1971, the National Weather Service assigned a rating of F5 to the tornado. In the 2010s, the National Centers for Environmental Information published information about the tornado, which included a path length of 5.4 miles (8.7 km) and a damage total of $250,000 (1957 USD).

=== Gorham–Sand Ridge–Murphysboro–Plumfield, Illinois ===
Gorham–Sand Ridge–Murphysboro–Plumfield, Illinois
- An aerial of Murphysboro after the tornado, looking west

Meteorological history
- Formed: December 18, 1957, 4:35 p.m. CST (UTC−06:00)
- Dissipated: December 18, 1957, 5:05 p.m. CST (UTC−06:00)
- Duration: 30 minutes

F4 tornado
- on the Fujita scale
- Highest winds: 207–260 mph (333–418 km/h)

Overall effects
- Fatalities: 11
- Injuries: 200

This tornado, the deadliest of the outbreak sequence, closely resembled the 1925 Tri-State tornado and affected some of the same areas that were hit in 1925, including locations in and near Gorham, Sand Ridge, Murphysboro, and De Soto. It may have touched down in eastern Missouri but was first observed at 4:45 pm. CST (some sources say 4:30 pm. CST) in Gorham, destroying or damaging forty homes there. One fatality occurred in nearby Sand Ridge. As it neared and passed through the southeast side of Murphysboro, the tornado paralleled the Big Muddy River, moving east-northeast. It produced the worst damage, which was rated F4, in this area, destroying old buildings; however, the most intense damage only affected a small section of southeast Murphysboro, where 10 of the 11 deaths occurred. Afterward, the tornado continued on to damage parts of De Soto, Hurst, and Bush. The tornado was last reported near Plumfield at 5:05 pm. CST (23:05 UTC). Murphysboro was powerless for almost three days as most utilities were in the worst-hit area. The tornado injured two hundred people along its path.

== Non-tornadic effects ==
Severe thunderstorms in connection with the outbreak on December 18 produced hail up to 3/4 in (1.9 cm) in diameter in St. Francois County, Missouri. Severe winds estimated at up to 60 mph (97 km/h) also affected the Hannibal area in that state, downing power lines and wires. In addition to the six known tornadoes in Missouri, unconfirmed reports of tornadoes occurred in Jefferson County, along with many reports of funnel clouds elsewhere in the state. Other unconfirmed tornadoes were reported in other states, including an alleged tornado that hit Rockville, Indiana. On December 19, a dust storm with 50-mile-per-hour (80 km/h) wind gusts tossed three roofs onto vehicles and reduced visibility to just 1/2 mi (0.80 km) in Dallas, Texas. In addition to the three confirmed tornadoes that hit the state that day, severe winds in Tennessee, reportedly unrelated to tornado activity, destroyed farm buildings, tore off roofs, and downed trees and electrical wires; though these may have been due to tornadoes, none was confirmed. In addition to two confirmed tornadoes, unconfirmed reports of tornado damage arrived from Royalton and Elkville, Illinois; though attributed to thunderstorm winds, these damages may have been due to tornadoes. Additionally, severe thunderstorm activity on December 18–19 contributed to severe flood conditions across parts of southern Illinois and in Missouri.

== Aftermath and recovery ==
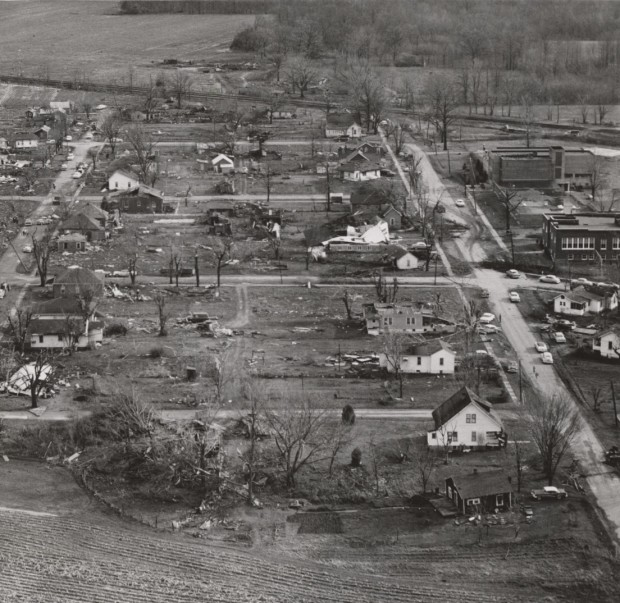
An aerial of Gorham, Illinois in the aftermath of an F4 tornado on December 18

After severe weather left the Murphysboro area in Illinois, police officers, firefighters, deputies, and other assistance were called out to the worst-hit subdivisions, Country Heights and Crown View. Then-Illinois Director of Public Health Dr. Roland Cross also sent for the hard-hit Mount Vernon area. Then-Governor of Illinois William G. Stratton directed Illinois state police to the affected areas of southern Illinois and also readied the Illinois National Guard for possible deployment to the region.

== See also ==
- List of tornadoes and tornado outbreaks
  - List of North American tornadoes and tornado outbreaks
- List of F5 and EF5 tornadoes
- Southern Illinois tornado history
  - St. Louis tornado history
- Tornado records
- Tornado outbreak of March 27, 1890 – Yielded numerous deadly, violent tornadoes
- Tornado outbreak sequence of May 1896 – Produced the third-deadliest tornado in U.S. history
- Tri-State tornado outbreak – Impacted some of the same areas as in 1957 on March 18, 1925
- 2012 Leap Day tornado outbreak – Produced an EF4-rated tornado on February 29
- Tornado outbreak of November 17, 2013 – Deadliest and costliest on record in Illinois since 1950
- Tornado outbreak of December 10–11, 2021 – Deadliest tornado outbreak in the month of December

== Sources ==
- Brooks, Harold E. (April 2004). "On the Relationship of Tornado Path Length and Width to Intensity" (PDF). Weather and Forecasting. 19 (2). Boston: American Meteorological Society: 310–19. Bibcode:2004WtFor..19..310B. doi:10.1175/1520-0434(2004)019<0310:OTROTP>2.0.CO;2.
- Cook, A. R.; Schaefer, J. T. (August 2008). "The Relation of El Niño–Southern Oscillation (ENSO) to Winter Tornado Outbreaks". Monthly Weather Review. 136 (8). Boston: American Meteorological Society: 3135. Bibcode:2008MWRv..136.3121C. doi:10.1175/2007MWR2171.1.
- Grazulis, Thomas P. (July 1993). Significant Tornadoes 1680–1991: A Chronology and Analysis of Events. St. Johnsbury, Vermont: The Tornado Project of Environmental Films. ISBN 1-879362-03-1.
- Grazulis, Thomas P. (2001a). The Tornado: Nature's Ultimate Windstorm. Norman, Oklahoma: University of Oklahoma Press. ISBN 978-0-8061-3538-0.
- Grazulis, Thomas P. (2001b). F5-F6 Tornadoes. St. Johnsbury, Vermont: The Tornado Project of Environmental Films.
- Joos, Lothar A. (December 1957). "Illinois – December 1957". Weather Summary. Climatological Data. Illinois. 62 (12). Asheville, North Carolina: National Climatic Data Center: 160. ;
- National Weather Service (December 1957). Storm Data Publication (Report). National Centers for Environmental Information – via Storm Events Database.
- U.S. Weather Bureau (December 1957). "Storm data and unusual weather phenomena". Climatological Data National Summary. 8 (12). Asheville, North Carolina: National Climatic Data Center: 522–531.
- Wilson, John W.; Changnon, Stanley A. (1971). Illinois Tornadoes (PDF) (Technical report). Illinois State Water Survey. Urbana, Illinois: State of Illinois Department of Registration and Education. p. 39. 103.
