= Tornado outbreak of March 27, 1890 =

Weather event in the United States

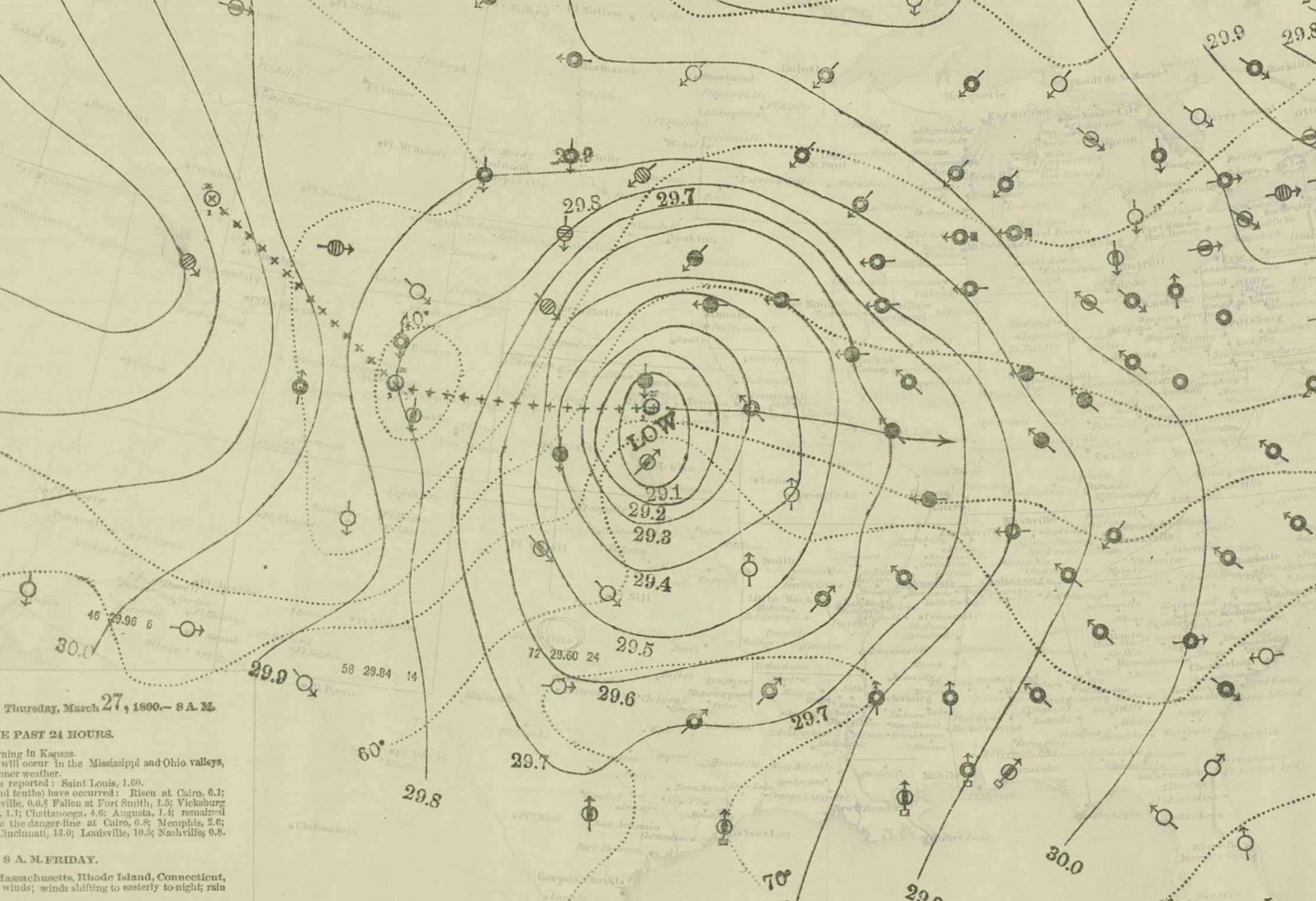
- Weather map of the low pressure system on March 27, that would produce the tornado outbreak

Meteorological history
- Duration: March 27, 1890

Tornado outbreak
- Tornadoes: ≥24 confirmed
- Max. rating: F4 tornado

Overall effects
- Casualties: ≥ 187 fatalities, ≥ 846 injuries
- Damage: > $2.7 million (1890 USD) (Note: All losses are in 1890 USD unless otherwise noted.) > $96.8 million (2025 USD)
- Areas affected: Middle Mississippi Valley

On Thursday, March 27, 1890, a major tornado outbreak struck the Middle Mississippi Valley. To this day, this outbreak is still one of the deadliest tornado events in United States history. At least 24 significant tornadoes, several of which were generated by cyclic supercells, were recorded to have spawned from this system, and at least 187 people were killed by tornadoes that day, including a devastating F4 tornado that struck Downtown Louisville, Kentucky, killing at least 115 people and injuring at least 200 others. Five other violent tornadoes occurred elsewhere, including a long-tracked F4 tornado family that crossed two states, killing 21 people and injuring 200, and two other F4s that killed 14 altogether. A pair of F3s near the Tennessee–Kentucky state line may have killed a combined 37 people. (Note: An outbreak is generally defined as a group of at least six tornadoes (the number sometimes varies slightly according to local climatology) with no more than a six-hour gap between individual tornadoes. An outbreak sequence, prior to (after) the start of modern records in 1950, is defined as a period of no more than two (one) consecutive days without at least one significant (F2 or stronger) tornado.) (Note: The Fujita scale was devised under the aegis of scientist T. Theodore Fujita in the early 1970s. Prior to the advent of the scale in 1971, tornadoes in the United States were officially unrated. While the Fujita scale has been superseded by the Enhanced Fujita scale in the U.S. since February 1, 2007, Canada used the old scale until April 1, 2013; nations elsewhere, like the United Kingdom, apply other classifications such as the TORRO scale.) (Note: Historically, the number of tornadoes globally and in the United States was and is likely underrepresented: research by Grazulis on annual tornado activity suggests that, as of 2001, only 53% of yearly U.S. tornadoes were officially recorded. Documentation of tornadoes outside the United States was historically less exhaustive, owing to the lack of monitors in many nations and, in some cases, to internal political controls on public information. Most countries only recorded tornadoes that produced severe damage or loss of life. Significant low biases in U.S. tornado counts likely occurred through the early 1990s, when advanced NEXRAD was first installed and the National Weather Service began comprehensively verifying tornado occurrences.)

== Background and impact ==
At 8:00 a.m. EST (13:00 UTC) on March 27, a vigorous low-pressure center of at most 29.1 inHg (990 mb) was in progress over central Kansas. Ahead of the low, an unstable air mass advected northward from the Gulf of Mexico, while a warm front positioned itself across Kentucky, southern Illinois, and south-central Missouri. By 8:00 p.m. EST (01:00 UTC), the low had deepened somewhat and tracked generally eastward across north-central Illinois, yielding a pressure of 29.274 inHg (991.3 mb) at Louisville, Kentucky, an hour earlier. A cold front encountering the warm, moist air mass over the Mississippi River Valley produced favorable wind shear for the development and growth of tornado-producing supercells over the warm sector. As a result, numerous long-lived tornado families occurred in a triangular region from St. Louis, Missouri, eastward to Louisville and southward to Huntsville, Alabama. In addition to 24 F2+ tornadoes, many other weaker tornadoes likely occurred but went unrecorded.

== Confirmed tornadoes ==
Confirmed tornadoes by Fujita rating
FU	F0	F1	F2	F3	F4	F5	Total
?	?	?	12	6	6	0	24

=== March 27 event ===
Confirmed tornadoes – Thursday, March 27, 1890 (Note: All dates are based on the local time zone where the tornado touched down; however, all times are in Coordinated Universal Time and dates are split at midnight CST/CDT for consistency.) (Note: Prior to 1994, only the average widths of tornado paths were officially listed.)
F#	Location	County / Parish	State	Time (UTC)	Path length	Max. width	Summary
F2	S of Ste. Genevieve (MO) to IL	Ste. Genevieve (MO), Randolph (IL)	Missouri, Illinois	21:00–?	7 mi (11 km)	100 yd (91 m)	The first significant tornado of the outbreak passed 1 mi (1.6 km) south of Ste. Genevieve in Missouri as it tracked northeast toward the Mississippi River. It damaged a church near Ste. Genevieve, but no one was injured. Afterward, the tornado struck Turkey Island in Illinois as it crossed the Mississippi River. The tornado leveled a barn in Illinois before dissipating. No known injuries occurred.
F2	Bloomsdale	Ste. Genevieve	Missouri	21:00–?	5 mi (8.0 km)	100 yd (91 m)	Concurrently with the preceding event, this strong tornado wrecked two pairs of homes in Bloomsdale. Two injuries were reported.
F2	SW of Rockwood (IL) to SE of Sunfield (IL)	Perry (MO), Randolph (IL), Jackson (IL), Perry (IL)	Missouri, Illinois	21:00–?	33 mi (53 km)	150 yd (140 m)	3 deaths – A long-tracked tornado—or, more probably, a tornado family—began in Missouri and headed northeast, destroying trees. Several of the trees, up to 18 inches (46 cm; 0.46 m) in diameter, allegedly landed in Illinois. The tornado left Missouri as it crossed the Mississippi River to a point north of Rockwood, Illinois. All deaths occurred at scattered points across rural areas in Illinois. Two fatalities occurred in the Shiloh Hill–Campbell Hill vicinity. Several homes lost roofs near Sunfield—later ravaged by an F5 tornado on December 18, 1957. In all, 25 people were injured.
F2	Falling Spring to NW of Belleville	St. Clair	Illinois	21:15–?	8 mi (13 km)	Unknown	1 death – This tornado touched down near Cahokia, causing a few injuries. The tornado then struck homes near Centreville, three of which were destroyed, resulting in the sole fatality for this tornado. The tornado later dissipated at "Harmony Station," just outside Belleville. Seven people were injured.
F4	NW of Shawneetown (MO) to Grand Tower (IL) to N of Carbondale (IL)	Cape Girardeau (MO), Perry (MO), Jackson (IL)	Missouri, Illinois	22:20–?	30 mi (48 km)	400 yd (370 m)	7 deaths – The first violent tornado of the outbreak developed in Missouri, across the Mississippi River from Illinois. In Missouri, the tornado produced its first death and ripped apart several farmhouses near Shawneetown. Heading northeast, the tornado then traversed the Mississippi River to strike Grand Tower in Illinois. There, it devastated 27 homes, a number of which it obliterated. Four people died in town. Two additional fatalities occurred as the tornado destroyed more homes at Poplar Ridge, causing additional F4 damage there, though due to frail construction the rating was questionable. 80 people were injured along the path.
F3	SE of Charleston (MO) to KY	Mississippi (MO), Ballard (KY)	Missouri, Kentucky	22:25–?	20 mi (32 km)	400 yd (370 m)	4 deaths – This intense tornado may have begun a series of violent tornadoes, a tornado family extending well into Kentucky. Forming near Charleston, the tornado passed 4 mi (6.4 km) east of town. It severely damaged "Huff's Station," killing four family members, leveling structures, and debarking trees. Further destruction occurred on the outskirts of Bird's Point, including the loss of "eight or nine" structures. Just south of Bird's Point the tornado leveled wide swaths of trees. The tornado crossed into Kentucky before dissipating, but caused no known damage there. Five people sustained injuries.
F2	S of McClure	Alexander	Illinois	22:30–?	Unknown	Unknown	A strong tornado of unknown duration passed near McClure, which was known as Wheatland in 1890. As it headed northeast, the tornado affected "Grey Point" and Clear Creek, wrecking one home and a barn. No injuries or deaths were reported.
F4	NW of Thebes (IL) to W of Stonefort (IL)	Scott (MO), Alexander (IL), Union (IL), Johnson (IL), Williamson (IL)	Missouri, Illinois	22:45–?	55 mi (89 km)	800 yd (730 m)	2 deaths – A long-lived, violent tornado family began in Missouri and crossed the Mississippi River into Illinois, passing near Thebes. Significant damage commenced in Union County, Illinois, principally near Springville, Mill Creek, and Mount Pleasant. In these areas, the tornado devastated 24 or more farmhouses. Northwest of Vienna, the tornado wrecked still more homes. Many farmhouses were leveled near Springville and Vienna. Both known fatalities took place in Illinois. 30 people were injured along the path. Reportedly, seats from a school were found 2 mi (3.2 km) away.
F3	W of Sparta to ENE of Nashville	Randolph, Perry, Washington, Jefferson	Illinois	23:15–?	40 mi (64 km)	500 yd (460 m)	2 deaths — This long-lived tornado family caused its first casualty upon touchdown, killing a person near Sparta. For the remainder of its path, the tornado family impacted numerous farms. Washington County alone reported losses of $100,000. An elderly person died at "Pollander," and the tornado obliterated "Little Prairie"; both communities were near Nashville. Two, possibly three, tornadoes were responsible for all the destruction. 50 injuries were reported.
F4	Metropolis (IL) to West Louisville (KY)	McCracken (KY), Massac (IL), Pope (IL), Livingston (KY), Crittenden (KY), Webster (KY), McLean (KY), Daviess (KY)	Kentucky, Illinois	23:15–?	95 mi (153 km)	400 yd (370 m)	21+ deaths – See section on this tornado – 200 people were injured.
F2	Olney	Richland	Illinois	23:30–?	6 mi (9.7 km)	100 yd (91 m)	A tornado tracked near the path of a similar event in 1872. It passed close to downtown Olney, destroying or damaging 33 homes, including a farmhouse. Several businesses were unroofed as well. Five people were injured.
F4	NW of Benton to Grand Rivers to Eddyville	Marshall, Lyon	Kentucky	00:00–?	25 mi (40 km)	400 yd (370 m)	7+ deaths – This violent, long-tracked tornado leveled rural farmsteads, timberland, various homes, and other structures, including approximately 50% of the structures in Grand Rivers. Traversing many rivers, the tornado wrecked a number of bridges. Most of the farms that were leveled were likely of frail construction. 50 people were injured.
F2	Xenia	Wayne, Clay	Illinois	00:00–?	10 mi (16 km)	Unknown	This strong tornado began south-southwest of town and tracked northeastward to a point east of town. It damaged or destroyed 20 barns and eight homes. 10 people were injured.
F2	W of Carmi to Crossville	White	Illinois	00:00–?	5 mi (8.0 km)	Unknown	1 death – A strong tornado destroyed several homes. 10 people were injured.
F2	S of Knottsville to N of Patesville	Daviess, Hancock	Kentucky	01:00–?	10 mi (16 km)	Unknown	2 deaths – The fatalities occurred separately in homes that were destroyed. 15 people were injured.
F2	Caledonia to W of Hopkinsville	Trigg, Christian	Kentucky	01:00–?	10 mi (16 km)	Unknown	A tornado destroyed several farmhouses. Eight people were injured and losses totaled $30,000.
F4	W of Shively (KY) to downtown Louisville (KY) to Jeffersonville (IN)	Jefferson (KY), Clark (IN)	Kentucky, Indiana	01:57–?	15 mi (24 km)	200 yd (180 m)	115 deaths – See section on this tornado – 200 people were injured.
F3	S of New Harmony to S of Princeton	Posey, Gibson	Indiana	02:00–?	25 mi (40 km)	Unknown	This tornado struck and destroyed structures on 15 farmsteads, of which five or more were farmhouses. Ten people were injured.
F4	NW of Hartford to Rineyville	Ohio, Grayson, Breckinridge, Hardin	Kentucky	02:00–?	60 mi (97 km)	1,200 yd (1,100 m)	7 deaths – This massive, long-tracked tornado family destroyed rural agricultural communities and many miles of forested land. Homes were reportedly obliterated in or near Sulphur Springs and Falls of Rough. A similar tornado destroyed Big Spring on March 19, 1849. 40 people were injured.
F3	S of Eminence to N of Pleasureville	Shelby, Henry	Kentucky	02:15–?	5 mi (8.0 km)	150 yd (140 m)	3 deaths – A tornado destroyed four farmhouses, killing three family members in one of them. 10 people were injured.
F3	SE of Gallatin to Rogana to NE of Eulia	Sumner, Macon	Tennessee	02:45–?	25 mi (40 km)	400 yd (370 m)	5+ deaths – A tornado destroyed the community of Rogana, which consisted of two stores and eight homes. A railroad bridge was wrecked as well. At least 50 people were injured. The tornado may have continued farther than listed, causing many more casualties; up to 20 people may have died and as many as 100 may have sustained injuries.
F3	S of Scottsville to Tracy	Allen, Barren	Kentucky	03:00–?	15 mi (24 km)	600 yd (550 m)	4+ deaths – This tornado destroyed at least three homes. At least 25 people were injured. The death toll may have been as high as 17.
F2	Near Blankenship Chapel to Fosterville to Big Springs	Bedford, Rutherford	Tennessee	03:30–?	25 mi (40 km)	100 yd (91 m)	2+ deaths – A tornado destroyed several homes in Rutherford County. Nine or more people were injured. Additional damage may have occurred in Cannon County, and a third person may have died as well. Grazulis listed no casualties, but further reanalysis by the National Weather Service in 2017 did. The tornado formed near the Duck River.
F2	Northwestern Fayetteville	Lincoln	Tennessee	04:00–?	Unknown	Unknown	1 death – This tornado destroyed or damaged 40 homes. 15 people were injured.

=== Metropolis, Illinois/Sheridan–Blackford–Dickson–Delaware, Kentucky ===
Metropolis, Illinois/Sheridan–Blackford–Dickson–Delaware, Kentucky
F4 tornado
- on the Fujita scale

Overall effects
- Casualties: ≥ 21 fatalities, 200 injuries
- Damage: > $200,000 (1890 USD) > $7.17 million (2025 USD)

This long-tracked, violent tornado family formed from the same supercell as the Bird's Point F3. One or more members of the family may have been the same as the Bird's Point tornado and touched down in Missouri, west of the Mississippi River, before entering Kentucky. After passing through McCracken County, the tornado traversed the Ohio River as a waterspout to strike the opposite shore at Metropolis, Illinois. In Metropolis the tornado destroyed 100 buildings, killed one person, and caused $150,000 in losses. The tornado reportedly carried water "as high as the rooftops" as it passed over the Ohio River. Unconfirmed rumors suggested that two Gypsies were killed in a nearby settlement and that a Gypsy woman was found 1/2 mi (0.80 km) distant. Three confirmed deaths occurred on farms and in homes from just northeast of Metropolis to near Bay City. Another death occurred on the eastern bank of the Ohio River, in Kentucky. The tornado reportedly was "greenish" in appearance as it entered Livingston County, killing at least three and possibly as many as 11 people. In Crittenden County the tornado caused six deaths, five of which occurred in a home at Sheridan. Between Blackford and Dixon the tornado destroyed several dozen farms and miles of timberland; widespread F4 damage occurred in this area. Eight or more fatalities were reported in Webster County. A train derailed as it struck downed trees near Sebree, causing three indirect fatalities. Five people in one family were killed near Delaware. The tornado finally dissipated as a downburst in West Louisville, causing F2 damage, one fatality, and $50,000 in losses there.

=== Louisville, Kentucky ===
Louisville, Kentucky
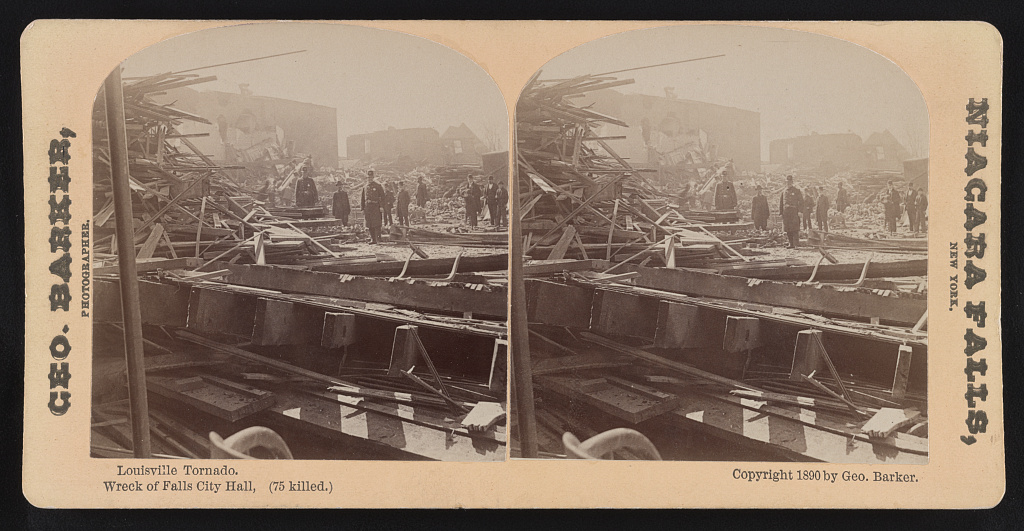
- Damage at Falls City Hall in Louisville.

F4 tornado
- on the Fujita scale

Overall effects
- Casualties: 115 fatalities, 200 injuries
- Damage: $3 million (1890 USD) $108 million (2025 USD)

This devastating tornado may have first touched down in Harrison County, Indiana, but records that would indicate the precise location are unavailable. The tornado is estimated to have developed just west of Shively shortly before 8:00 p.m. CST (01:00 UTC). With a trajectory that varied between northeast and north-northeast, it approached Louisville at a speed of 36 to 40 mph (58 to 64 km/h). In Louisville observers witnessed a thunderstorm to their southwest, noting that the cloud was of "extreme blackness" and lit by lightning. Heavy rainfall preceded the tornado itself, suggestive of a high-precipitation (HP) supercell, and surface temperatures rose to 68 °F (20 °C).

The tornado generated its first significant damage in the California neighborhood of Louisville, then caused the only incidence of F4 damage in the Parkland area, near the intersection of 28th and Dumesnil Streets. After leveling a couple of homes in Parkland, the tornado weakened as it entered Downtown Louisville, yet widened from 200 to 500 yd (180 to 460 m). The most extensive damage occurred in a swath from the intersection of 34th Street and the Algonquin Parkway to the western half of the central business district, including Crescent Hill. Numerous unreinforced buildings, often multi-story, collapsed, including the Falls City Hall, where 44 or more fatalities occurred—one of the highest death tolls due to a single building collapse from a tornado in U.S. history. Some sources placed the toll at 55 in the Falls City Hall. Throughout the path, wreckage caught fire, burning several people to death; century-old oaks and a water tower were downed; and iron railings were wrenched and snapped.

Before crossing the Ohio River into Indiana, the tornado destroyed a total of 766 buildings–including 532 residences, 32 manufacturers, 10 tobacco warehouses, seven rail depots, five churches, three schools, and two public halls–in Louisville, costing the city at least $2.5 million. The tornado ended as a downburst in Jeffersonville, Indiana, causing widespread damage, minor injuries, and $500,000 in losses. At least 18 structures were destroyed or damaged there, primarily within a few blocks of the riverfront. In all, the tornado killed at least 115 people (possibly as high as 120), placing it among the deadliest tornadoes in United States history, and remains the deadliest tornado in Kentucky's history to date.

== Aftermath and recovery ==
Following the tornado at Louisville, then-Red Cross president Clara Barton arrived to assist the recovery. Electric trolleys were used to compensate for a shortage of hearses. The City of Louisville, while declining outside aid, also established 60-man work crews to sift through wreckage for survivors. Three days after the disaster—on March 30, Palm Sunday—as many as 45 separate funeral services were conducted in Louisville.

== See also ==
- List of North American tornadoes and tornado outbreaks
- List of tornadoes striking downtown areas

== Sources ==
- Brooks, Harold E. (April 2004). "On the Relationship of Tornado Path Length and Width to Intensity". Weather and Forecasting. 19 (2): 310–19. Bibcode:2004WtFor..19..310B. doi:10.1175/1520-0434(2004)019<0310:OTROTP>2.0.CO;2.
- Bush, Bryan S. (March 6, 2012). "The Great Cyclone of 1890: Tragedy Struck Louisville". Bryan S. Bush Books. Archived from the original on May 21, 2014.
- Cook, A. R.; Schaefer, J. T. (August 2008). "The Relation of El Niño–Southern Oscillation (ENSO) to Winter Tornado Outbreaks". Monthly Weather Review. 136 (8): 3135. Bibcode:2008MWRv..136.3121C. doi:10.1175/2007MWR2171.1.
- Grazulis, Thomas P. (May 1984). Violent Tornado Climatography, 1880–1982. OSTI (Technical report). NUREG. Washington, D.C.: Nuclear Regulatory Commission. OSTI 7099491. CR-3670.
  - — (November 1990). Significant Tornadoes 1880–1989. Vol. 2. St. Johnsbury, Vermont: The Tornado Project of Environmental Films. ISBN 1-879362-02-3.
  - — (July 1993). Significant Tornadoes 1680–1991: A Chronology and Analysis of Events. St. Johnsbury, Vermont: The Tornado Project of Environmental Films. ISBN 1-879362-03-1.
  - — (2001a). The Tornado: Nature's Ultimate Windstorm. Norman: University of Oklahoma Press. ISBN 978-0-8061-3538-0.
  - — (2001b). F5-F6 Tornadoes. St. Johnsbury, Vermont: The Tornado Project of Environmental Films.
- "Tiger of the Air: the Incredible Tornado of March 27, 1890" (PDF). Louisville, KY Weather Forecast Office. Louisville, Kentucky: National Weather Service. Archived (PDF) from the original on March 24, 2019.
- U.S. Signal Service (March 1890). "Winds". Monthly Weather Review. 18 (3). Boston: American Meteorological Society: 73–5. doi:10.1175/1520-0493(1890)18[73:W]2.0.CO;2.
  - — (March 1890). "Chart V. Weather Map, 8 a. m. (75th Meridian Time). March 27, 1890". Monthly Weather Review. 18 (3). Boston: American Meteorological Society: c5. doi:10.1175/1520-0493(1890)183[c5:CVWMAM]2.0.CO;2.
- "Whirling Tigers of the Air: a Century of Louisville Tornadoes". University of Louisville Photographic Archives. Louisville, Kentucky: University of Louisville. 2000. Archived from the original on September 10, 2006.
- Yater, George H. (1987). Two Hundred Years at the Fall of the Ohio: A History of Louisville and Jefferson County (2nd ed.). Filson Club, Incorporated.

Preceded by Grinnell, IA (1882)	Costliest U.S. tornadoes on Record; March 27, 1890	Succeeded by St. Louis, MO–East St. Louis, IL (1896)
