= Rice, Illinois =

Rice, Illinois may refer to places in the United States:

- Rice, Jo Daviess County, Illinois, an unincorporated community
- Rice, Perry County, Illinois, an unincorporated community
