= Marion tornado =

The phrase "Marion tornado" may refer to:

- The 1982 Marion, Illinois tornado
- The 2004 Marion, North Dakota tornado
- The 2025 Marion, Illinois tornado
