= 1982 Marion tornado outbreak =

Natural disaster in southern Illinois, United States in 1982

Marion, Illinois tornado outbreak
Meteorological history
- Duration: May 29, 1982

Tornado outbreak
- Tornadoes: 7 confirmed
- Max. rating: F4 tornado
- Duration: 13 hours, 10 minutes

Overall effects
- Casualties: 10 fatalities, 188 injuries
- Damage: >$166 million (1997 USD)
- Areas affected: Illinois, Indiana, Missouri
- Part of the tornado outbreaks of 1982

The Marion tornado outbreak was a small, severe tornado outbreak that affected southern portions of the Midwestern United States on May 29, 1982.

Tornadoes touched down in the states of Illinois, Missouri, and Indiana, with Marion, Illinois, being the hardest hit. Ten fatalities occurred there after the town took a direct hit from an F4 tornado. The outbreak also produced an F3 tornado affecting the Conant, Illinois, area and several weaker tornadoes in the surrounding area.

== Meteorological synopsis ==
Radar loop of the storm that produced the Marion, Illinois, tornado.

On the 12:00 UTC surface chart, a cold front was draped from Minnesota southwest across Iowa, Kansas, Oklahoma, and into Texas. A triple point was found just south of Des Moines, Iowa, with a warm front positioned east across northern Illinois and Indiana. Morning dew points ranged from 65 °F (18 °C) at Saint Louis, Missouri, and Louisville, Kentucky, to 72 °F (22 °C) at Memphis, Tennessee. 70 or 71 °F (21 or 22 °C) dew points were found in Fort Smith, Arkansas, Springfield and Cape Girardeau, Missouri, and Fort Campbell, Kentucky. An outflow boundary was draped over Central Illinois and Missouri from overnight convection that was decaying as it tracked east across the two states. This outflow boundary provided the potential for storms to redevelop. By mid-afternoon, temperatures at Carbondale, Illinois, and Marion had risen to the middle and upper 80s°F with dew points near 70 °F (21 °C). At 1:03 p.m., a tornado watch was issued for the region. Later in the afternoon the National Weather Service in Saint Louis, Missouri, issued several severe weather warnings for Williamson County and surrounding counties. At 2:58 p.m. a severe thunderstorm warning was issued for Jackson County and Williamson County. At 3:00 p.m, a tornado was observed near Carterville, Illinois, prompting a tornado warning at 3:19 p.m.

== Confirmed tornadoes ==
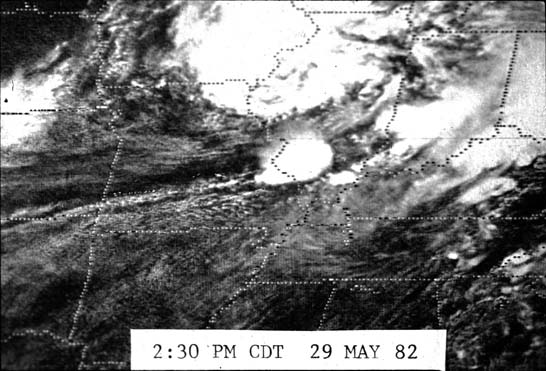
Satellite photo of the clouds that produced the storm.

Confirmed tornadoes by Fujita rating
FU	F0	F1	F2	F3	F4	F5	Total
0	2	3	0	1	1	0	7

List of confirmed tornadoes – Saturday, May 29, 1982 (Note: All dates are based on the local time zone where the tornado touched down; however, all times are in Coordinated Universal Time for consistency.)
F#	Location	County / Parish	State	Start Coord.	Time (CST)	Path length	Max width	Summary
F1	SE of Columbia	Boone	MO	38.83°N 92.18°W	03:00	0.06 miles (0.097 km)	20 yards (18 m)	A brief tornado destroyed a shed.
F1	Caesarscreek Township	Greene	OH	39.62°N 84.07°W	12:30	0.25 miles (0.40 km)	50 yards (46 m)	A small, brief tornado heavily damaged or destroyed several farm buildings.
F3	N of Percy to WNW of Conant	Randolph, Perry	IL	38.03°N 89.67°W	13:05–13:20	10 miles (16 km)	200 yards (180 m)	A house and a power station were damaged near Percy. Four homes were destroyed and five were damaged in Conant. Seven people were injured. Damage was estimated at $300,000.
F4	NW of Carterville to E of Marion	Williamson	IL	37.72°N 89.13°W	14:05–14:32	17 miles (27 km)	400 yards (370 m)	10 deaths – See article on this tornado – 181 people were injured.
F0	SE of Harrisburg	Saline	IL	37.70°N 88.48°W	15:26	unknown	unknown	A "spot touchdown" damaged a barn and several trees.
F0	NE of Carrier Mills	Saline	IL	37.72°N 88.67°W	15:46	unknown	unknown	Power lines were downed. No path was observed.
F1	Princeton	Gibson	IN	38.35°N 87.57°W	16:10	unknown	unknown	A service station was destroyed.

=== Marion, Illinois ===
Marion, Illinois tornado
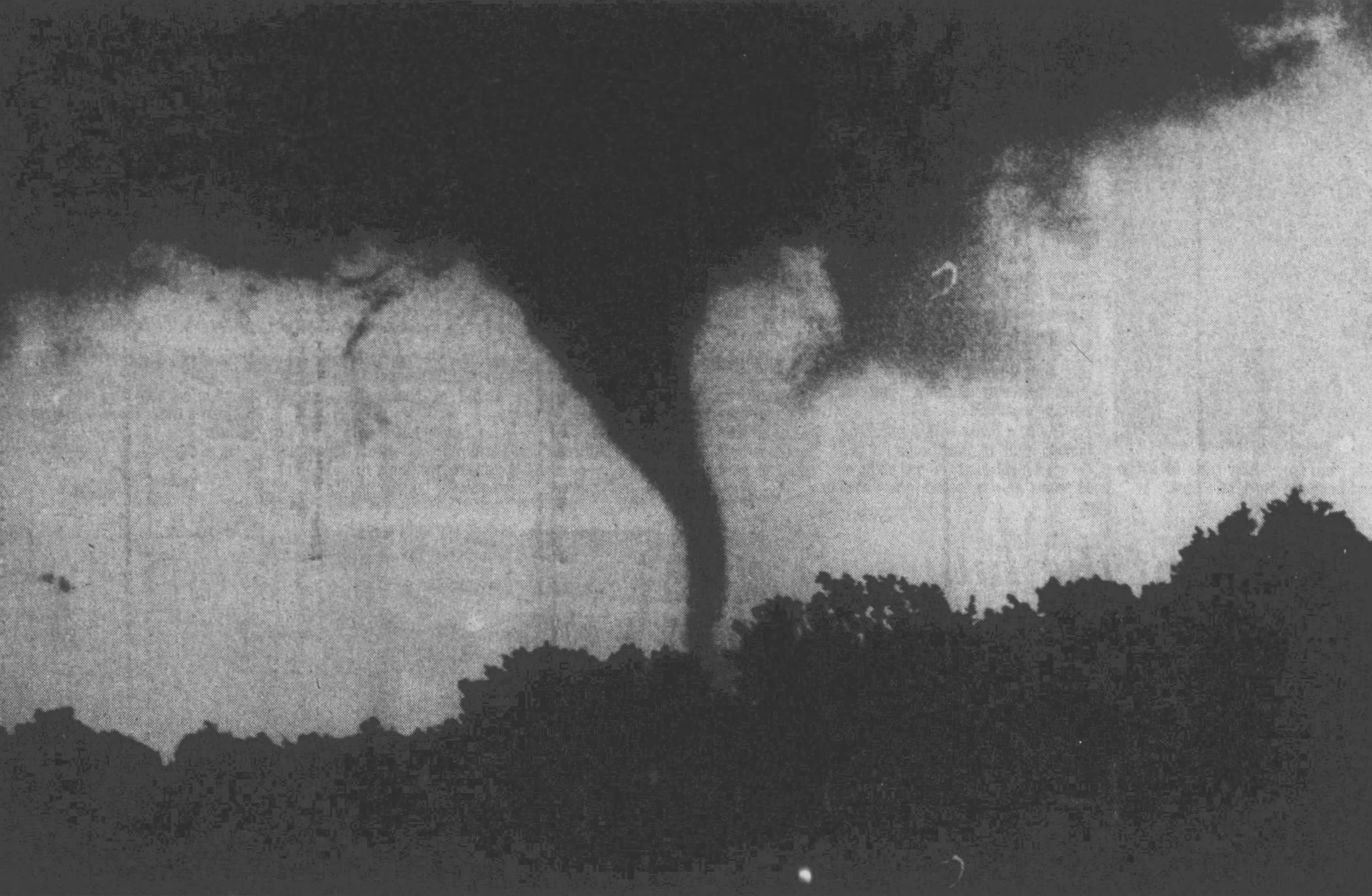
- The tornado shortly after formation.

Meteorological history
- Date: May 29, 1982
- Formed: May 29, 1982, 3:00 p.m. CST (UTC–06:00)
- Dissipated: May 29, 1982, 3:30 p.m. CST (UTC–06:00)
- Duration: 30 minutes

F4 tornado
- on the Fujita scale
- Highest winds: 207–260 mph (333–418 km/h)

Overall effects
- Casualties: 10 fatalities, 181 injuries

The Marion tornado touched down near Carterville, at 3:00 p.m. resulting in damage to a subdivision near John A. Logan College. It then tracked into downtown Carterville then tracked southeast into Crainville, Illinois, after which it caused moderate damage to the area surrounding Williamson County Regional Airport. At 3:16 p.m. the tornado either formed a new funnel or changed course as it tracked into the west side of Marion along Illinois Route 13, causing extensive damage throughout the city. During this time the tornado was observed to have a multiple-vortex structure with up to three subvortices swirling around the main tornado. The tornado struck a car along Interstate 57, causing it to explode. By 3:30 p.m. the tornado had exited the city and dissipated near Illinois Route 166. The tornado had destroyed the Shawnee Village Apartment Complex and severely damaged three shopping centers. It heavily damaged the area surrounding the Interstate 57 and Illinois Route 13 interchange including the Marion Ford dealership, and also damaged two schools, 648 homes, and 52 businesses. It caused 10 deaths and 181 injuries, and left over 1,000 people homeless.

== See also ==
- List of North American tornadoes and tornado outbreaks
- 2025 Marion, Illinois tornado – A violent tornado, of an EF4 rating impacted areas to the south 43 years later
