= Matthews, Illinois =

- Unincorporated community
- Location within Illinois Location within the United States
- Coordinates: 37°58′03″N 89°22′26″W
- Country: United States
- State: Illinois
- County: Perry
- Elevation: 387 ft (118 m)
- Time zone: UTC-6 (Central (CST))
  - Summer (DST): UTC-5 (CDT)
- Area code: 618
- GNIS feature ID: 422949

Matthews is an unincorporated community in Perry County, Illinois, United States. The community is located along County Route 18 near its intersection with Illinois Route 13 and Illinois Route 127, 8.1 miles (13.0 km) west-southwest of Du Quoin.
