= Todds Mill, Illinois =

- Unincorporated community
- Location within Illinois Location within the United States
- Coordinates: 38°12′09″N 89°21′57″W
- Country: United States
- State: Illinois
- County: Perry
- Elevation: 492 ft (150 m)
- Time zone: UTC-6 (Central (CST))
  - Summer (DST): UTC-5 (CDT)
- Area code: 618
- GNIS feature ID: 423247

Todds Mill is an unincorporated community in Perry County, Illinois, United States. Todds Mill is 8.5 miles (13.7 km) north of Pinckneyville.
