= Old Du Quoin, Illinois =

- Unincorporated community
- Location within Illinois Location within the United States
- Coordinates: 37°58′30″N 89°10′59″W
- Country: United States
- State: Illinois
- County: Perry
- Elevation: 443 ft (135 m)
- Time zone: UTC-6 (Central (CST))
  - Summer (DST): UTC-5 (CDT)
- Area code: 618
- GNIS feature ID: 415014

Old Du Quoin is an unincorporated community in Perry County, Illinois, United States. The community is located along Illinois Route 14 3.8 miles (6.1 km) southeast of downtown Du Quoin. The community was the original site of Du Quoin before its residents relocated to a site next to a new railroad line in the 1850s.
