= Layfield, Illinois =

- Unincorporated community
- Location within Illinois Location within the United States
- Coordinates: 38°06′23″N 89°26′07″W
- Country: United States
- State: Illinois
- County: Perry
- Elevation: 535 ft (163 m)
- Time zone: UTC-6 (Central (CST))
  - Summer (DST): UTC-5 (CDT)
- Area code: 618
- GNIS feature ID: 422902

Layfield is an unincorporated community in Perry County, Illinois, United States. The community is located along Illinois Route 13 3.4 miles (5.5 km) northwest of Pinckneyville.
