= Denmark, Illinois =

- Unincorporated community
- Location within Illinois Location within the United States
- Coordinates: 37°59′51″N 89°29′50″W
- Country: United States
- State: Illinois
- County: Perry
- Elevation: 440 ft (130 m)
- Time zone: UTC-6 (Central (CST))
  - Summer (DST): UTC-5 (CDT)
- Area code: 618
- GNIS feature ID: 422617

Denmark is an unincorporated community in Perry County, Illinois, United States. Denmark is 4.5 miles (7.2 km) southeast of Cutler.

== History ==
A post office was established at Denmark in 1865, and remained in operation until 1906. The first postmaster being a Danish immigrant most likely caused the name to be selected.
