= Winkle, Illinois =

- Unincorporated community
- Location within Illinois Location within the United States
- Coordinates: 38°09′00″N 89°29′19″W
- Country: United States
- State: Illinois
- County: Perry
- Elevation: 561 ft (171 m)
- Time zone: UTC-6 (Central (CST))
  - Summer (DST): UTC-5 (CDT)
- Area code: 618
- GNIS feature ID: 423323

Winkle (also Craig, Craigs, Winkle Station) is an unincorporated community in Perry County, Illinois, United States. Winkle is 7.5 miles (12.1 km) northwest of Pinckneyville.

Winkle was originally known as Craig, and was founded by William Craig in 1871. The townsite was sold to mining tycoon Joseph Winkle around 1903, and the town gradually took his name. A coal mine was soon built at the townsite. Winkle's population peaked at over 1000 in the 1920s, and the town featured a newspaper, a hotel, a school, a feed mill, a large general store, and several other businesses.

The coal mine closed in 1936, and the general store in 1978. By 1998, only a few residents in trailers remained, but the town's old train station was still standing and refurbished into a private residence.
