= Vince Castino =

American baseball player (1917–1967)

- Catcher
- Born: October 11, 1917; Willisville, Illinois, U.S.
- Died: March 6, 1967 (aged 49); Sacramento, California, U.S.
- Batted: Right Threw: Right

MLB debut
- June 24, 1943, for the Chicago White Sox

Last MLB appearance
- September 25, 1945, for the Chicago White Sox

MLB statistics
- Batting average: .228
- Home runs: 2
- Runs batted in: 23
- Stats at Baseball Reference

Teams
- Chicago White Sox (1943–1945)

Vincent Charles Castino (October 11, 1917 – March 6, 1967) was an American catcher in Major League Baseball. He played 88 games and had a career batting average of .228.
