= Conant, Illinois =

- Unincorporated community
- Location within Illinois Location within the United States
- Coordinates: 38°03′21″N 89°28′56″W
- Country: United States
- State: Illinois
- County: Perry
- Elevation: 459 ft (140 m)
- Time zone: UTC-6 (Central (CST))
  - Summer (DST): UTC-5 (CDT)
- Area code: 618
- GNIS feature ID: 406433

Conant is an unincorporated community in Perry County, Illinois, United States. Conant is 5.5 miles (8.9 km) west-southwest of Pinckneyville. an intense F2 tornado struck in small city in December 18, 1957.
