= 1982 Marion, Illinois tornado =

1982 tornado in Marion, Illinois

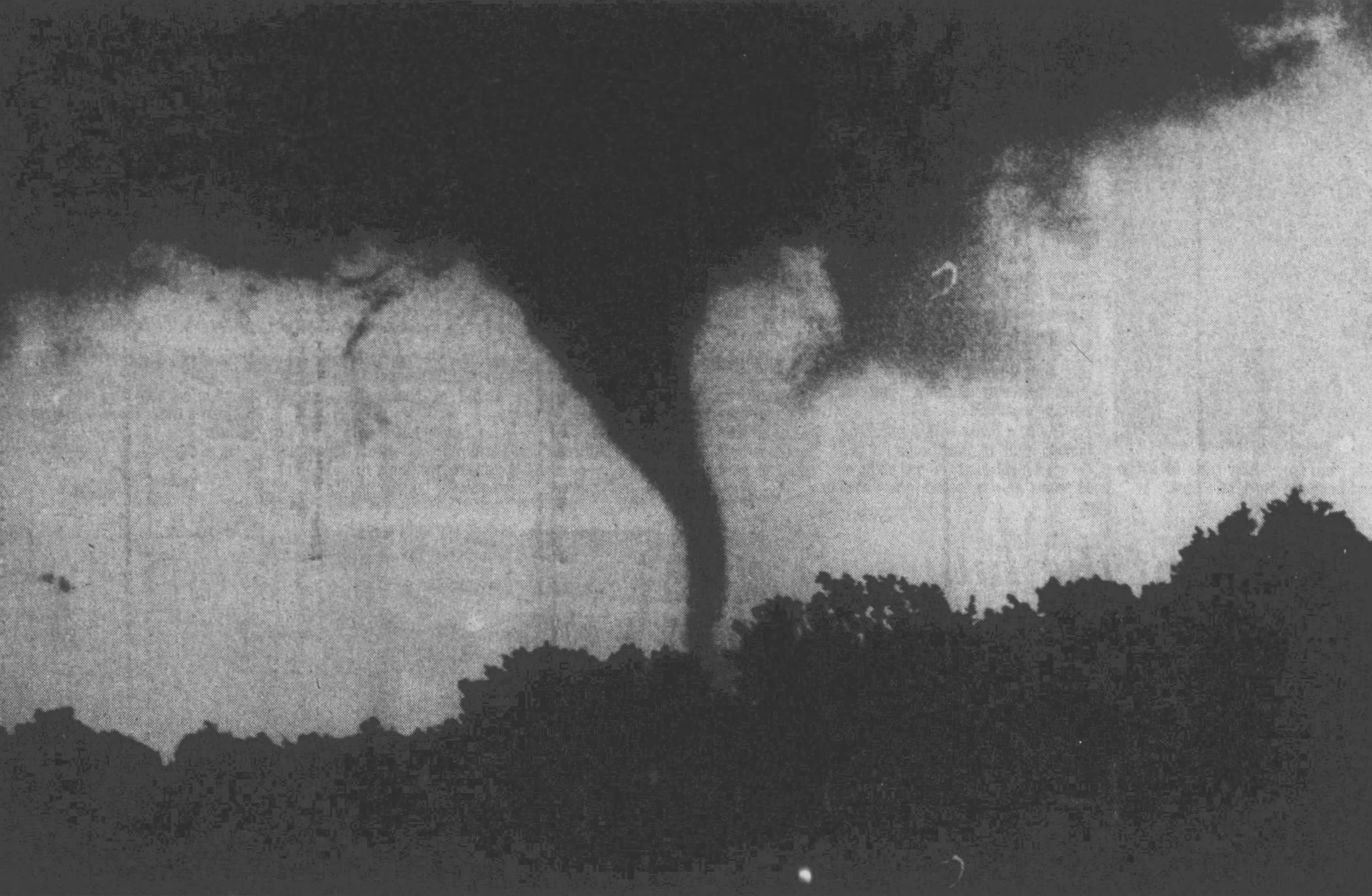
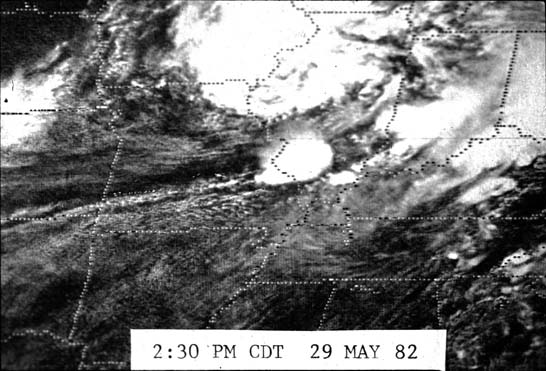
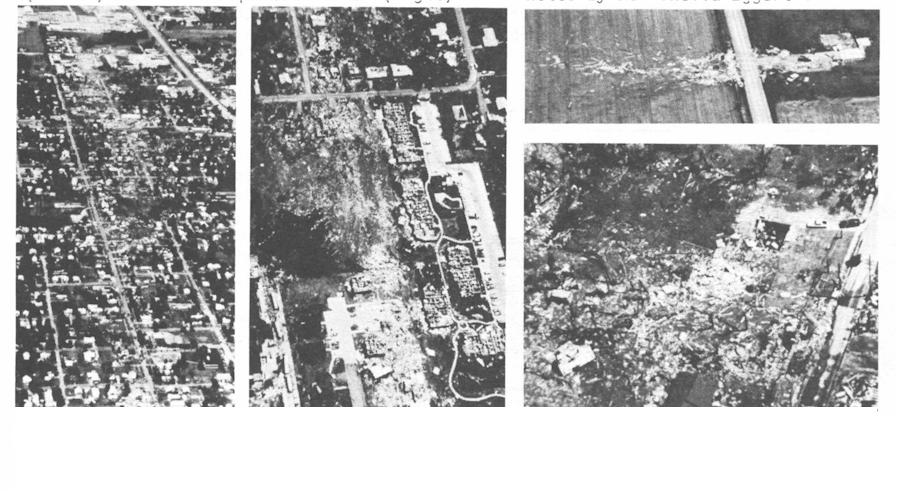
- Clockwise from top: The tornado shortly after touchdown; Radar scans of the tornado; Satellite imagery of the tornado; Damage in Marion

Meteorological history
- Date: May 29, 1982
- Formed: May 29, 1982, 3:00 p.m. CST (UTC–06:00)
- Dissipated: May 29, 1982, 3:30 p.m. CST (UTC–06:00)
- Duration: 30 minutes

F4 tornado
- on the Fujita scale
- Highest winds: 207–260 mph (333–418 km/h)

Overall effects
- Fatalities: 10
- Injuries: 181
- Part of the 1982 Marion tornado outbreak and tornadoes of 1982

In early afternoon hours of May 29, 1982, a strong and deadly tornado would travel for 17 miles (27 km) over 30 minutes claiming 10 lives and injuring another 181. Part of a larger outbreak in the same area, this tornado would be the strongest and deadliest of the outbreak, as well as being the most destructive tornado of that year. The tornado would end up causing an estimated $85 million to $100 million (USD) in damages, when it destroyed over 100 buildings in Marion. The tornado would also reach a max width of around half a mile wide. After starting at as a relatively small and weak tornado, it would strengthen to F1 intensity before hitting the outskirts of Carterville, before briefly strengthening to F2 when it crossed Illinois Highway 13. It would significantly strengthen once again, reaching F3 intensity before quickly weakening to F2 around Illinois Highway 148. It would once again strengthen rapidly to F3, then F4 as it completely destroyed several barns and trees. here it was at its widest, reaching approximately half a mile wide. had now traveled more than half its distance, and had injured a few people along 13 and 148. It would weaken to F2 before gaining intensity and reaching F4 just after crossing Interstate 57. The tornado would impact the north side of Marion at peak intensity, destroying a train station and several houses. Mass injury also happened when it hit a shopping center and a brand new car show room, causing several deaths here. It would also hit a apartment complex killing seven inside. another person died inside her home when it was completely obliterated by the tornado. At this point, the tornado would start to weaken, causing F3 and F2 damage. The tornado would also begin to show multiple vortexes as it began to rope out. The tornado would finally dissipate just southeast of Illinois Highway 166. After the tornado dissipated, several emergency response teams helped with finding and assisting people. In the following months, hundreds of people helped with cleaning up the damage. In 1983, one year after the tornado, a memorial was placed for all of the people who died from the tornado.

== Meteorological setup ==
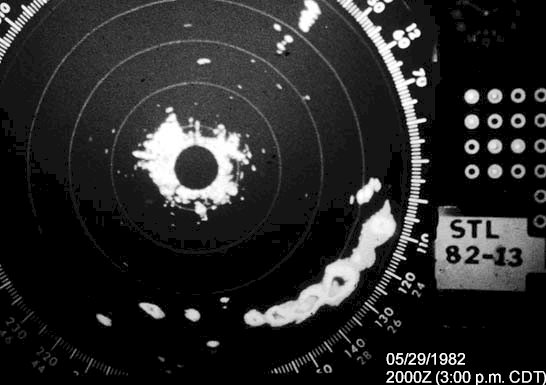
Radar of the storms that would go on to produce the tornadoes

Surface weather analysis at 12:00 UTC identified a cold front extending southwestward from Minnesota through Iowa, Kansas, and Oklahoma into Texas. A meteorological triple point was located immediately south of Des Moines, Iowa, where the cold front intersected a warm front that stretched eastward through northern Illinois and Indiana. Early day atmospheric moisture levels were high, with surface dew points varying from 65 °F (18 °C) in Saint Louis, Missouri, and Louisville, Kentucky, to 72 °F (22 °C) in Memphis, Tennessee. Similar dew points between 70 °F and 71 °F (21 to 22 °C) were recorded across Fort Smith, Arkansas, Springfield and Cape Girardeau, Missouri, and Fort Campbell, Kentucky. Additionally, a mesoscale outflow boundary from dissipating overnight convective activity persisted across central Illinois and Missouri, serving as a potential mechanism for subsequent storm initiation. Thermodynamic destabilization progressed into the afternoon as solar heating increased ambient temperatures. By mid-afternoon, monitoring stations in Carbondale and Marion, Illinois, recorded temperatures in the mid-to-upper 80s °F, alongside persistent dew points near 70 °F (21 °C). This highly unstable environment prompted the issuance of a tornado watch for the affected region at 13:03 UTC (1:03 p.m.). As convective development accelerated later in the day, the National Weather Service forecast office in Saint Louis, Missouri, enacted official severe weather warnings encompassing Williamson County and its adjacent jurisdictions.

== Path and impact ==
The tornado would spawn from a relatively low precipitation supercell around 3:00 PM (CST). A tornado warning from the National Weather Station located in St. Louis, Missouri would be issued for Marion around 10 minutes before the actual tornado would begin. While tornado sirens were activated, Carterville did not received a warning just before the tornado struck leaving residents little time to react. The tornado touched down just shortly after 3:00 PM., and crossed over empty farmland. it would, however, hit and scatter a hay bale stack. The tornado would cross over Carterville inflicting F1 and F2 damage to buildings and trees. It would destroy 2 houses in the city. The tornado continue over farmland causing F2 to F3 intensity destruction, especially to the ground and trees. It would continue to cross parallel to Illinois Highway 13, inflicting damage to trees and power poles. The Williamson County Airport would also sustain moderate damages. It would enter Marion at 3:30 P.M at peak intensity, destroying a Ford dealership, a strip mall, and a plaza. It would then kill two people in a house, including an 11–year–old. It would then strike the Shawnee Village apartments, a low income living space for seniors, killing seven in one building. The tornado would then exit the town and kill one more person on Interstate 57 when the tornado would hit a car and exploding it. After crossing over Illinois Highway 13, it would finally dissipate.

== Aftermath ==
In the following hours of the tornado, several first responders and volunteers would help with recovery and cleaning. The next day, the National Gard came in to prevent looting from houses. Governor Jim Edgar would declare a state of emergency for the towns that were affected. Over all, 161 homes were damaged, with 175 apartments from the Shawnee Village apartments alone. 54 businesses were heavily damaged or destroyed, including the Marion Ford. Over 1,000 people were left without a home. The damage would end up exceeding $90,000 (USD).

=== Deaths ===
- James Paul Gulledge
- Ferne Kobler
- Zelma Latham
- Lynn Moore
- Pauline Pearson
- Mae E. Rader
- James Bryan Simmons
- Helen White
- Leona White
- Effie Jane Wilson
