= Rice, Perry County, Illinois =

Rice, Illinois
- Unincorporated community
- Location within Illinois Location within the United States
- Coordinates: 38°12′02″N 89°23′01″W
- Country: United States
- State: Illinois
- County: Perry
- Elevation: 509 ft (155 m)
- Time zone: UTC-6 (Central (CST))
  - Summer (DST): UTC-5 (CDT)
- Area code: 618
- GNIS feature ID: 416579

Rice is an unincorporated community in Perry County, Illinois, United States.
