= Cutler, Illinois =

Cutler
- Village
- Location of Cutler in Perry County, Illinois.
- Coordinates: 38°01′57″N 89°34′03″W
- Country: United States
- State: Illinois
- County: Perry

Area
  - Total: 0.47 sq mi (1.21 km^{2})
  - Land: 0.47 sq mi (1.21 km^{2})
  - Water: 0 sq mi (0.00 km^{2})
- Elevation: 499 ft (152 m)

Population (2020)
  - Total: 361
  - Density: 771.2/sq mi (297.77/km^{2})
- Time zone: UTC-6 (CST)
  - Summer (DST): UTC-5 (CDT)
- ZIP code: 62238
- Area code: 618
- FIPS code: 17-18225
- GNIS ID: 2398664

Cutler is a village in Perry County, Illinois, United States. As of the 2020 census, Cutler had a population of 361.

== History ==
A post office has been in operation at Cutler since 1872. The village's name honors Cutler Dawson, a railroad official.

== Geography ==
According to the 2010 census, Cutler has a total area of 0.47 square miles (1.22 km^{2}), all land.

== Demographics ==
Historical population
| Census | Pop. | Note | %± |
|---|---|---|---|
| 1880 | 76 | | — |
| 1910 | 324 | | — |
| 1920 | 363 | | 12.0% |
| 1930 | 521 | | 43.5% |
| 1940 | 590 | | 13.2% |
| 1950 | 520 | | −11.9% |
| 1960 | 445 | | −14.4% |
| 1970 | 508 | | 14.2% |
| 1980 | 495 | | −2.6% |
| 1990 | 523 | | 5.7% |
| 2000 | 543 | | 3.8% |
| 2010 | 441 | | −18.8% |
| 2020 | 361 | | −18.1% |
U.S. Decennial Census

As of the census of 2000, there were 543 people, 199 households, and 149 families residing in the village. The population density was 1,146.4 inhabitants per square mile (442.6/km^{2}). There were 207 housing units at an average density of 437.0 per square mile (168.7/km^{2}). The racial makeup of the village was 99.26% White, 0.18% African American, and 0.55% from two or more races. Hispanic or Latino of any race were 0.37% of the population.

There were 199 households, out of which 38.2% had children under the age of 18 living with them, 58.3% were married couples living together, 12.1% had a female householder with no husband present, and 25.1% were non-families. 23.1% of all households were made up of individuals, and 10.6% had someone living alone who was 65 years of age or older. The average household size was 2.73 and the average family size was 3.15.

In the village, the population was spread out, with 29.5% under the age of 18, 9.6% from 18 to 24, 27.4% from 25 to 44, 21.5% from 45 to 64, and 12.0% who were 65 years of age or older. The median age was 34 years. For every 100 females, there were 90.5 males. For every 100 females age 18 and over, there were 87.7 males.

The median income for a household in the village was $30,417, and the median income for a family was $32,292. Males had a median income of $30,938 versus $20,417 for females. The per capita income for the village was $13,678. About 22.0% of families and 29.2% of the population were below the poverty line, including 32.7% of those under age 18 and 22.6% of those age 65 or over.
