= Sunfield, Illinois =

- Unincorporated town
- Location within Illinois Location within the United States
- Coordinates: 38°03′52″N 89°14′24″W
- Country: United States
- State: Illinois
- County: Perry
- Elevation: 456 ft (139 m)
- Time zone: UTC-6 (Central (CST))
  - Summer (DST): UTC-5 (CDT)
- Area code: 618
- GNIS feature ID: 419375

Sunfield is an unincorporated town in Perry County, Illinois, United States. Sunfield is 3.5 miles (5.6 km) north of Du Quoin. An F5 tornado struck 1 mile north of the village at the US Route 51/State Route 154 intersection on December 18, 1957, killing three people; in March 2020 an EF1 tornado passed through the town itself, injuring one and causing significant damage.
