= Willisville, Illinois =

Willisville
- Village
- Location of Willisville in Perry County, Illinois.
- Coordinates: 37°58′58″N 89°35′23″W
- Country: United States
- State: Illinois
- County: Perry

Area
  - Total: 0.39 sq mi (1.01 km^{2})
  - Land: 0.39 sq mi (1.01 km^{2})
  - Water: 0 sq mi (0.00 km^{2})
- Elevation: 495 ft (151 m)

Population (2020)
  - Total: 579
  - Density: 1,487/sq mi (574.1/km^{2})
- Time zone: UTC-6 (CST)
  - Summer (DST): UTC-5 (CDT)
- ZIP code: 62997
- Area code: Area code 618
- FIPS code: 17-81867
- GNIS ID: 2399699

Willisville is a village in Perry County, Illinois, United States. As of the 2020 census, Willisville had a population of 579.

== Geography ==
According to the 2010 census, Willisville has a total area of 0.39 square miles (1.01 km^{2}), all land.

== Demographics ==
Historical population
Census	Pop.	Note	%±
1900	398		—
1910	1,082		171.9%
1920	1,485		37.2%
1930	506		−65.9%
1940	781		54.3%
1950	635		−18.7%
1960	532		−16.2%
1970	659		23.9%
1980	628		−4.7%
1990	577		−8.1%
2000	694		20.3%
2010	633		−8.8%
2020	579		−8.5%
U.S. Decennial Census

As of the census of 2000, there were 694 people, 270 households, and 194 families residing in the village. The population density was 1,840.4 inhabitants per square mile (710.6/km^{2}). There were 295 housing units at an average density of 782.3 per square mile (302.0/km^{2}). The racial makeup of the village was 99.57% White, 0.14% Native American, and 0.29% from two or more races. Hispanic or Latino of any race were 0.86% of the population.

There were 270 households, out of which 36.7% had children under the age of 18 living with them, 53.3% were married couples living together, 13.0% had a female householder with no husband present, and 28.1% were non-families. 24.8% of all households were made up of individuals, and 13.7% had someone living alone who was 65 years of age or older. The average household size was 2.57 and the average family size was 3.04.

In the village, the population was spread out, with 27.4% under the age of 18, 9.7% from 18 to 24, 27.5% from 25 to 44, 20.7% from 45 to 64, and 14.7% who were 65 years of age or older. The median age was 35 years. For every 100 females, there were 94.9 males. For every 100 females age 18 and over, there were 86.0 males.

The median income for a household in the village was $31,000, and the median income for a family was $35,667. Males had a median income of $27,386 versus $21,548 for females. The per capita income for the village was $12,832. About 15.4% of families and 17.8% of the population were below the poverty line, including 24.9% of those under age 18 and 8.7% of those age 65 or over.

== Notable person ==
- Vince Castino, catcher for the Chicago White Sox
