= Perry County, Illinois =

County in Illinois, United States

- County
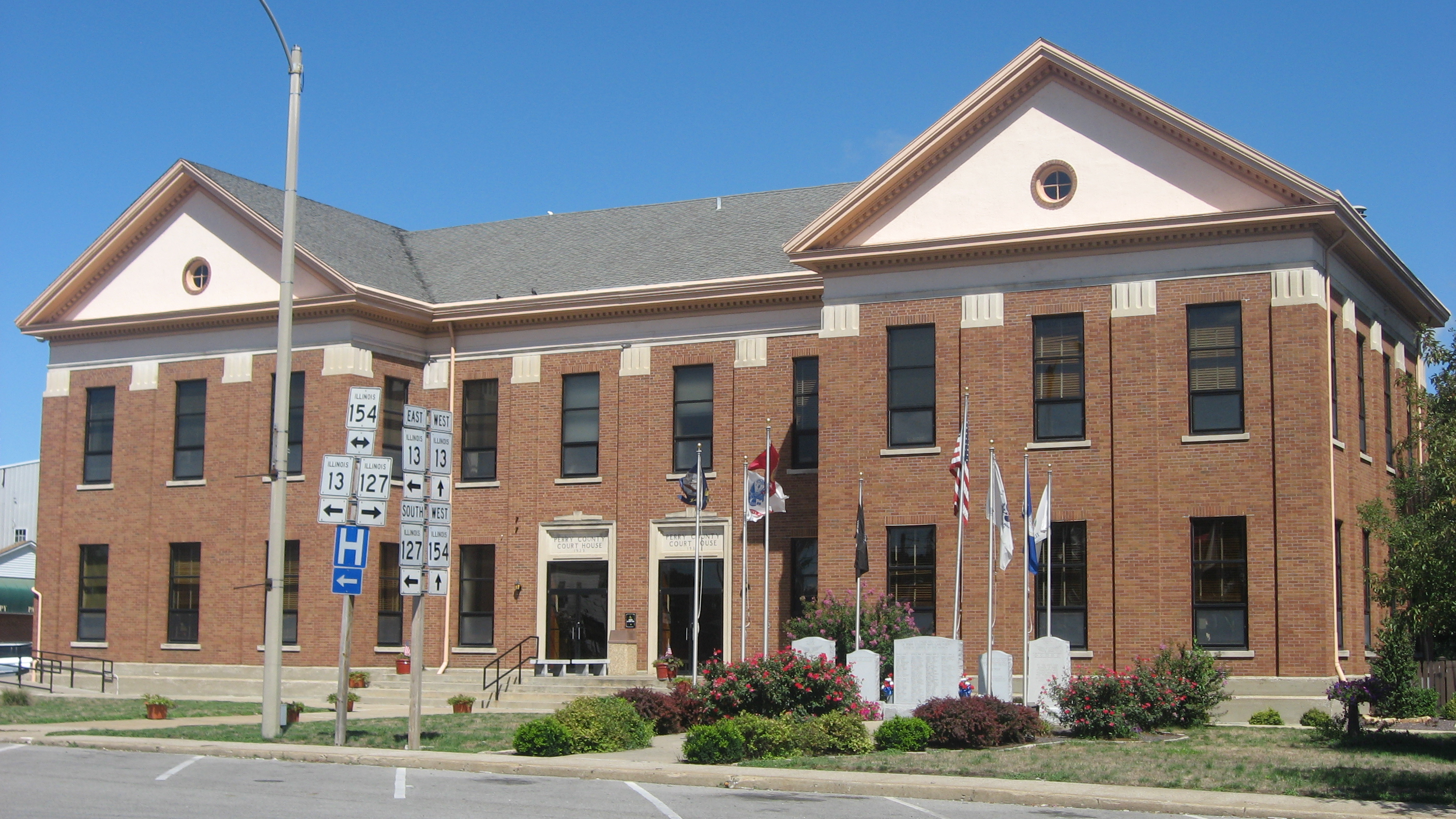
- Perry County Courthouse in Pinckneyville

- Location within the U.S. state of Illinois
- Coordinates: 38°05′N 89°22′W
- Country: United States
- State: Illinois
- Founded: January 29, 1827
- Named for: Oliver Hazard Perry
- Seat: Pinckneyville
- Largest city: Du Quoin

Area
  - Total: 447 sq mi (1,160 km^{2})
  - Land: 442 sq mi (1,140 km^{2})
  - Water: 5.2 sq mi (13 km^{2}) 1.2%

Population (2020)
  - Total: 20,945
  - Estimate (2025): 20,160 ▼
  - Density: 47.4/sq mi (18.3/km^{2})
- Time zone: UTC−6 (Central)
  - Summer (DST): UTC−5 (CDT)
- Congressional district: 12th
- Website: perrycountyil.gov

Perry County is a county in Illinois. According to the 2020 census, it had a population of 20,945. Its county seat is Pinckneyville. It is located in the southern portion of Illinois known as "Little Egypt".

== History ==
Perry County was formed in 1827 out of Jackson and Randolph counties. It was named in honor of Oliver Hazard Perry who defeated the British fleet at the decisive Battle of Lake Erie in the War of 1812.

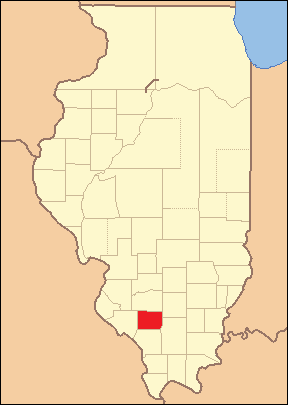
Perry County at the time of its creation in 1827

In its early history, Perry County was mainly an inland pioneer outpost. Early settlers, including some Revolutionary War veterans bearing land grants, moved here from the Eastern United States. These were primarily Protestant settlers. Growth boomed in the 1850s for two reasons: construction of the Illinois Central Railroad through the eastern portion of the county, and the discovery of large coal reserves. Immigrants from Ireland, Poland, Germany, Italy and elsewhere steadily increased the county's population from 1850 through the 1920s. African Americans also were established in the county during northward migration following the Civil War.

Mining continued to be the dominant employment sector through the 1990s.

== Geography ==
According to the U.S. Census Bureau, the county has a total area of 447 square miles (1,160 km^{2}), of which 442 square miles (1,140 km^{2}) is land and 5.2 square miles (13 km^{2}) (1.2%) is water.

Perry County is located in Southern Illinois. Pinckneyville, at the center of the county, is approximately 70 miles (110 km) southeast of St. Louis, Missouri and 300 miles (480 km) southwest of Chicago. The Mississippi River lies about 10 miles (16 km) west and southwest of the County at its closest point.

The county's topography is mainly flat with some rolling hills. The part of the county's eastern border, the part shared with Franklin County, is formed by the Little Muddy River. Beaucoup Creek runs north to south through the county and lies just east of Pinckneyville.

The county's topography also features many "strip cut" lakes, lakes left behind following above-ground coal mining. Lakes at two of the county's chief recreation areas, the Du Quoin State Fairgrounds and Pyramid State Recreation Area, were formed this way.

=== Climate and weather ===
Pinckneyville, Illinois

Climate chart (precipitation, max. and min. temperature)
J	F	M	A	M	J	J	A	S	O	N	D
2.8 40 22	2.6 46 26	4.3 57 36	4.3 68 45	4.8 77 55	4.2 86 64	3.5 90 68	3.3 88 65	3.3 81 57	3.2 71 45	4.4 56 36	3.5 44 26
- █ Average max. and min. temperatures in °F
- █ Precipitation totals in inches
- Source: The Weather Channel
Metric conversion
J	F	M	A	M	J	J	A	S	O	N	D
70 4 −6	66 8 −3	109 14 2	108 20 7	122 25 13	107 30 18	90 32 20	85 31 18	83 27 14	81 22 7	113 13 2	88 7 −3
- █ Average max. and min. temperatures in °C
- █ Precipitation totals in mm

In recent years, average temperatures in the county seat of Pinckneyville have ranged from a low of 22 °F (−6 °C) in January to a high of 90 °F (32 °C) in July, although a record low of −22 °F (−30 °C) was recorded in January 1912 and a record high of 113 °F (45 °C) was recorded in July 1934. Average monthly precipitation ranged from 2.61 inches (66 mm) in February to 4.81 inches (122 mm) in May.

=== Public transit ===
- South Central Transit
- Du Quoin station

=== Major highways ===
- U.S. Route 51
- Illinois Route 4
- Illinois Route 13
- Illinois Route 14
- Illinois Route 127
- Illinois Route 150
- Illinois Route 152
- Illinois Route 154

=== Adjacent counties ===
- Washington County - north
- Jefferson County - northeast
- Franklin County - east
- Jackson County - south
- Randolph County - west

== Demographics ==
Historical population
Census	Pop.	Note	%±
1830	1,215		—
1840	3,222		165.2%
1850	5,278		63.8%
1860	9,552		81.0%
1870	13,723		43.7%
1880	16,007		16.6%
1890	17,529		9.5%
1900	19,830		13.1%
1910	22,088		11.4%
1920	22,901		3.7%
1930	22,767		−0.6%
1940	23,438		2.9%
1950	21,684		−7.5%
1960	19,184		−11.5%
1970	19,757		3.0%
1980	21,714		9.9%
1990	21,412		−1.4%
2000	23,094		7.9%
2010	22,350		−3.2%
2020	20,945		−6.3%
2025 (est.)	20,160	▼	−3.7%
U.S. Decennial Census; 1790-1960 1900-1990; 1990-2000 2010

=== 2020 census ===
As of the 2020 census, the county had a population of 20,945. The median age was 42.0 years. 19.4% of residents were under the age of 18 and 20.5% of residents were 65 years of age or older. For every 100 females there were 117.2 males, and for every 100 females age 18 and over there were 121.1 males age 18 and over.

The racial makeup of the county was 85.6% White, 8.0% Black or African American, 0.2% American Indian and Alaska Native, 0.6% Asian, <0.1% Native Hawaiian and Pacific Islander, 1.9% from some other race, and 3.7% from two or more races. Hispanic or Latino residents of any race comprised 3.4% of the population.

28.3% of residents lived in urban areas, while 71.7% lived in rural areas.

There were 8,014 households in the county, of which 27.5% had children under the age of 18 living in them. Of all households, 48.5% were married-couple households, 19.1% were households with a male householder and no spouse or partner present, and 25.9% were households with a female householder and no spouse or partner present. About 30.4% of all households were made up of individuals and 15.2% had someone living alone who was 65 years of age or older.

There were 9,123 housing units, of which 12.2% were vacant. Among occupied housing units, 77.5% were owner-occupied and 22.5% were renter-occupied. The homeowner vacancy rate was 1.6% and the rental vacancy rate was 11.4%.

=== Racial and ethnic composition ===
Perry County, Illinois – Racial and ethnic composition Note: the US Census treats Hispanic/Latino as an ethnic category. This table excludes Latinos from the racial categories and assigns them to a separate category. Hispanics/Latinos may be of any race.
Race / Ethnicity (NH = Non-Hispanic)	Pop 1980	Pop 1990	Pop 2000	Pop 2010	Pop 2020	% 1980	% 1990	% 2000	% 2010	% 2020
White alone (NH)	21,138	20,812	20,563	19,463	17,779	97.35%	97.20%	89.04%	87.08%	84.88%
Black or African American alone (NH)	418	387	1,849	1,856	1,653	1.93%	1.81%	8.01%	8.30%	7.89%
Native American or Alaska Native alone (NH)	21	23	46	43	34	0.10%	0.11%	0.20%	0.19%	0.16%
Asian alone (NH)	33	63	63	87	125	0.15%	0.29%	0.27%	0.39%	0.60%
Native Hawaiian or Pacific Islander alone (NH)	x	x	4	8	1	x	x	0.02%	0.04%	0.00%
Other race alone (NH)	26	7	7	16	34	0.12%	0.03%	0.03%	0.07%	0.16%
Mixed race or Multiracial (NH)	x	x	156	278	605	x	x	0.68%	1.24%	2.89%
Hispanic or Latino (any race)	78	120	406	599	714	0.36%	0.56%	1.76%	2.68%	3.41%
Total	21,714	21,412	23,094	22,350	20,945	100.00%	100.00%	100.00%	100.00%	100.00%

=== 2010 census ===
As of the 2010 United States census, there were 22,350 people, 8,335 households, and 5,622 families residing in the county. The population density was 50.6 inhabitants per square mile (19.5/km^{2}). There were 9,426 housing units at an average density of 21.3 per square mile (8.2/km^{2}). The racial makeup of the county was 87.9% white, 8.3% black or African American, 0.4% Asian, 0.2% American Indian, 1.6% from other races, and 1.4% from two or more races. Those of Hispanic or Latino origin made up 2.7% of the population. In terms of ancestry, 32.8% were German, 14.3% were Irish, 10.6% were English, 8.1% were American, and 6.3% were Polish.

Of the 8,335 households, 30.4% had children under the age of 18 living with them, 51.5% were married couples living together, 11.3% had a female householder with no husband present, 32.5% were non-families, and 28.6% of all households were made up of individuals. The average household size was 2.38 and the average family size was 2.90. The median age was 39.4 years.

The median income for a household in the county was $40,696 and the median income for a family was $50,130. Males had a median income of $40,768 versus $28,377 for females. The per capita income for the county was $17,926. About 11.5% of families and 14.0% of the population were below the poverty line, including 22.6% of those under age 18 and 6.9% of those age 65 or over.

== Communities ==
Perry County never adopted a township form of government. Federal township plats were prepared for each township which include legal descriptions of 14 townships.

Perry County has been divided into precincts: Beaucoup, Cutler, Denmark, DuQuoin, Paradise, Pinckneyville, Sunfield, Swanwick, Tamaroa and Willisville. To provide election precincts of similar population based on recent census data, precincts are divided or combined to form election precincts. The election precincts in 2020 were: Beaucoup, Cutler, Du Quoin Number 1, Du Quoin Number 2, Du Quoin Number 3, Du Quoin Number 4, Du Quoin Number 5, Du Quoin Number 6, Du Quoin Number 7, Du Quoin Number 8, Du Quoin Number 9, Du Quoin Number 10, Du Quoin Number 11, Du Quoin Number 12, Pinckneyville Number 1, Pinckneyville Number 2, Pinckneyville Number 3, Pinckneyville Number 4, Pinckneyville Number 5, Pinckneyville Number 6, Pinckneyville Number 7, Pinckneyville Number 8, Sunfield, Swanwick, Tamaroa Number 1, Tamaroa Number 2, and Willisville.

=== Cities ===
- Du Quoin
- Pinckneyville

=== Villages ===
- Cutler
- St. Johns
- Tamaroa
- Willisville

=== Unincorporated communities ===
- Conant
- Denmark
- Layfield
- Matthews
- Old Du Quoin
- Rice
- Sunfield
- Swanwick
- Todds Mill
- Winkle

== Politics ==
Perry County has been reliably Republican county since 2012, when it backed Mitt Romney (R) by nearly 18 points over Illinois native Barack Obama, even as Obama won both Illinois and the country. By 2020 it was so heavily Republican that incumbent Donald Trump beat Democrat Joe Biden by nearly 45 points in his bid for reelection, even as Biden won the race nationally (and Illinois). The county last voted blue, by a very narrow margin of 0.6%, in 2000. The table below includes a list of Perry County's election results at the presidential level.

As of February 2025, the county is one of 7 that voted to join the state of Indiana.

United States presidential election results for Perry County, Illinois
Year	Republican		Democratic		Third party(ies)	
Year	No.	%	No.	%	No.	%
1892	1,840	44.14%	1,980	47.49%	349	8.37%
1896	2,342	48.57%	2,370	49.15%	110	2.28%
1900	2,336	48.25%	2,321	47.94%	184	3.80%
1904	2,451	52.65%	1,466	31.49%	738	15.85%
1908	2,392	46.27%	2,482	48.01%	296	5.73%
1912	894	18.89%	2,107	44.53%	1,731	36.58%
1916	4,796	49.70%	4,445	46.07%	408	4.23%
1920	4,598	58.47%	2,478	31.51%	788	10.02%
1924	3,693	39.76%	3,007	32.37%	2,589	27.87%
1928	4,636	47.47%	5,029	51.49%	101	1.03%
1932	3,778	32.85%	7,400	64.34%	324	2.82%
1936	5,482	42.94%	7,043	55.16%	243	1.90%
1940	7,243	52.35%	6,539	47.26%	55	0.40%
1944	6,236	56.97%	4,677	42.73%	33	0.30%
1948	5,109	49.96%	5,043	49.32%	74	0.72%
1952	6,580	55.19%	5,340	44.79%	3	0.03%
1956	6,513	57.06%	4,901	42.94%	0	0.00%
1960	6,708	57.47%	4,958	42.48%	6	0.05%
1964	4,287	39.24%	6,639	60.76%	0	0.00%
1968	5,384	49.02%	4,449	40.51%	1,150	10.47%
1972	6,968	62.98%	4,084	36.91%	12	0.11%
1976	5,286	46.39%	5,976	52.44%	133	1.17%
1980	5,888	55.49%	4,337	40.88%	385	3.63%
1984	5,852	55.88%	4,584	43.77%	36	0.34%
1988	4,576	46.78%	5,167	52.83%	38	0.39%
1992	3,105	28.01%	6,009	54.20%	1,972	17.79%
1996	3,237	32.63%	5,347	53.90%	1,337	13.48%
2000	4,802	48.30%	4,862	48.90%	278	2.80%
2004	5,589	53.61%	4,770	45.76%	66	0.63%
2008	5,086	50.89%	4,701	47.03%	208	2.08%
2012	5,507	57.67%	3,819	39.99%	223	2.34%
2016	6,855	69.42%	2,462	24.93%	557	5.64%
2020	7,313	72.61%	2,612	25.94%	146	1.45%
2024	6,949	75.00%	2,146	23.16%	170	1.83%

== See also ==
- National Register of Historic Places listings in Perry County
