= Illinois Route 13 =

State highway in Illinois, United States

Illinois Route 13
- IL 13 highlighted in red

Route information
- Maintained by IDOT
- Length: 151.54 mi (243.88 km)
- Existed: November 5, 1918–present

Major junctions
- West end: IL 157 / IL 163 in Cahokia Heights
- US 51 in Carbondale; I-57 in Marion; US 45 / IL 34 in Harrisburg; IL 1 near Equality
- East end: KY 56 in Old Shawneetown

Location
- Country: United States
- State: Illinois
- Counties: St. Clair, Washington, Randolph, Perry, Jackson, Williamson, Saline, Gallatin

Highway system
- Illinois State Highway System; Interstate; US; State; Tollways; Scenic
← US 12	→ US 14

Illinois Route 13 (IL 13) is a major east–west state route in southern Illinois. Illinois 13 has its western terminus at Cahokia Heights at Illinois Route 157 and its eastern terminus at the Kentucky state line and the Ohio River, at Kentucky Route 56. This is a distance of 151.54 miles (243.88 km).

== Route description ==
=== Cahokia Heights to Carbondale ===
Illinois 13 runs southeast from the East St. Louis to Carbondale. It is the main highway between these two cities. Starting in Cahokia Heights, IL 13 begins at the IL 157/IL 163 junction. Immediately, IL 13 travels southeast along IL 157. At the next junction, IL 157 branches off northeast. At this point, IL 13 largely parallels the IL 15 expressway. In Belleville, IL 13 meets IL 15 at an incomplete parclo. Continuing southeast, IL 13 largely serves Belleville's business district, unlike the expressway. It then meets IL 15 again and IL 158 at a dumbbell interchange. After that, IL 13 runs concurrently with IL 158. They then intersect IL 159 above Richland Creek. They soon separated from each other. IL 13 turns southeast to connect and then run concurrently with IL 15.

Both routes then turn south towards Freeburg along a four-lane divided highway. At the village limit of Freeburg, the road downgrades into a four-lane undivided highway. Then, the road downgrades into a three-lane roadway in the village. IL 15 then breaks away eastward from IL 13. IL 13 continues southward towards New Athens. Just west of New Athens, as IL 13 curves southeastward, it intersects IL 156. After that, it crosses a bridge over the Kaskaskia River. It then passes through Lenzburg, Marissa (where IL 4 starts to follow along IL 13), Whiteoak, Tilden (where IL 13 branches eastward away from IL 4), Coulterville (where IL 153 briefly runs concurrently with IL 13), Swanwick, Winkle, and Pinckneyville.

In Pinckneyville, IL 13 turns east along IL 154. At the Perry County Courthouse and the Perry County Jail, IL 13 turns south, leaving IL 154 and joining IL 127. Both IL 13 and IL 127 then pass through the Pyramid State Recreation Area, Pyatts (where they intersect IL 152), and Vergennes. Then, IL 4 intersects IL 13 once again. In Murphysboro, IL 149 joins the concurrency. Continuing south, IL 13 turns eastward, leaving the concurrency. At this point, IL 13 skirts the northern edge of the Shawnee Hills and the Shawnee National Forest. It then crosses the Big Muddy River as a four-lane divided highway. Near downtown Carbondale, the road then becomes a six-lane divided highway, then undivided, and then a seven-lane undivided highway. The route then splits into a one-way pair (westbound traffic serves Main Street; eastbound traffic serves Walnut Street). It then intersects US 51 as another one-way pair.

=== Carbondale to Kentucky state line ===
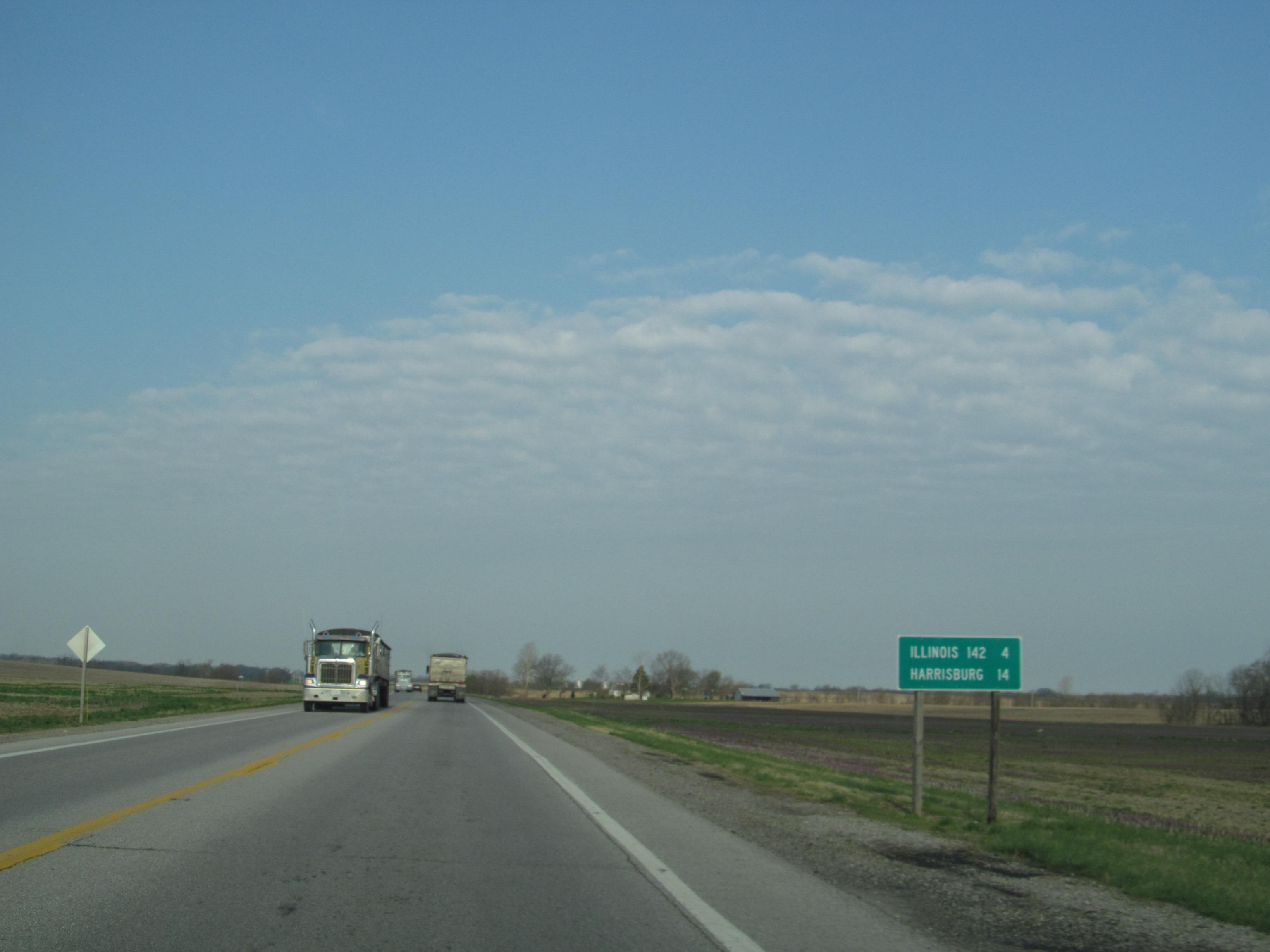
IL 13 looking west near Harrisburg

After passing through Carbondale, IL 13 then proceeds to pass through Carterville, Crainville, and Herrin. It then intersects IL 148 southwest of the Veterans Airport of Southern Illinois. In Marion, it then meets I-57 at a SPUI and then IL 37 at a signalized intersection. Beyond that, IL 13 intersects IL 166 in between Marion and Crab Orchard. It then proceeds eastward towards Harrisburg. In Harrisburg, IL 34 runs concurrently with IL 13 before intersecting with US 45. At that point, IL 34 turns south along US 45. Near Equality, IL 13 intersects IL 142. In between Equality and Junction, it then intersects IL 1. Then, the route continues eastward through Shawneetown and then Old Shawneetown before crossing the Shawneetown Bridge over the Ohio River. At that point, IL 13 becomes KY 56.

== History ==
The state of Illinois was founded in 1818. One of its first governmental tasks was the construction of primitive dirt roads between the three pioneer villages of Cahokia, Kaskaskia, and Shawneetown. Illinois Route 13 is a distant descendant of most of the Cahokia-Shawneetown route and has a claim to be one of the oldest state highways in Illinois.

Illinois Route 13 did not take its current physical form, though, until after the enactment of the Good Roads Movement paving program in 1918. The statewide plan standardized the alignment of this road and numbered it Illinois 13.

Except for a few alignment changes, Illinois 13 has remained the same since its inception in 1918. In 1937 it was rerouted around Sparta (now Illinois Route 4 and Illinois Route 154), replacing a large chunk of Illinois Route 152 in the process.

Another reroute took place between 1944 and 1947 when Illinois 13 took over a new highway (then called U.S. Route 460) in and around Belleville. The old route became Alternate Illinois 13. In 1947 it was moved back to Bond Avenue. Later, U.S. 460 would be dropped and replaced with Illinois Route 15.

=== Harrisburg Bypass ===
To address congestion in downtown Harrisburg, the Illinois Department of Transportation undertook a project to build the Bill Franks Bypass, a new four-lane road to reroute IL 13 around the city center. The bypass was named in 2011 after a prominent local businessman and philanthropist. In October 2010, the first section of the bypass opened on the north side of Harrisburg, between Illinois Route 34 and U.S. 45, and IL 34 was rerouted on this portion of the bypass. The remaining section of the bypass west of IL 34, replacing IL 13's former route along busy Poplar Street, opened in April 2012.

== Major intersections ==
County	Location	mi	km	Destinations	Notes
St. Clair	Cahokia Heights	0.0	0.0	IL 157 south / IL 163 (Camp Jackson Road) – Cahokia Heights, East St. Louis, St. Louis Downtown Airport	West end of IL 157 overlap
St. Clair	Cahokia Heights	0.9	1.4	IL 157 north – Caseyville	roundabout; east end of IL 157 overlap
St. Clair	Belleville	3.2	5.1	IL 15 – East St. Louis, Mount Vernon	interchange; no access from IL 13 east to IL 15 west or IL 15 east to IL 13 west
St. Clair	Belleville	8.0	12.9	IL 158 west (Centreville Avenue) to IL 15 – Columbia	roundabout; west end of IL 158 overlap
St. Clair	Belleville	8.9	14.3	IL 159 (South Illinois Street) – Collinsville, Red Bud	
St. Clair	Belleville	9.3	15.0	IL 158 east / IL 177 east – Scott AFB	East end of IL 158 overlap
St. Clair		10.6	17.1	IL 15 west – East St. Louis	interchange; west end of IL 15 overlap; westbound exit and eastbound entrance
St. Clair	Freeburg	17.1	27.5	IL 15 east (Urbanna Drive) – Mount Vernon	East end of IL 15 overlap
St. Clair		23.3	37.5	IL 156 west – Hecker	
St. Clair	Marissa	34.3	55.2	IL 4 north – Mascoutah, St. Libory	West end of IL 4 overlap
Randolph		37.8	60.8	IL 4 south – Sparta	East end of IL 4 overlap
Randolph	Coulterville	43.2	69.5	IL 153 north to IL 15	West end of IL 153 overlap
Randolph	Coulterville	43.5	70.0	IL 153 south – Eden	East end of IL 153 overlap
Perry	Pinckneyville	57.2	92.1	IL 154 west – Sparta	West end of IL 154 overlap
Perry	Pinckneyville	58.2	93.7	IL 127 north (Main Street) / IL 154 east (Water Street) – Nashville	East end of IL 154 overlap; west end of IL 127 overlap
Perry		63.8	102.7	IL 152 east – Du Quoin, Pyramid State Park	
Jackson		74.9	120.5	IL 4 north / Truax Traer Road – Ava	
Jackson	Murphysboro	80.8	130.0	IL 149 east (Sixth Street) – De Soto	West end of IL 149 overlap
Jackson	Murphysboro	81.7	131.5	IL 127 south / IL 149 west / Lincoln Heritage Trail (Southern Branch) (Walnut Street) – Jonesboro, Chester	East end of IL 127 / IL 149 overlap; west end of Lincoln Heritage Trail overlap
Jackson	Carbondale	88.8	142.9	US 51 south (University Avenue) – SIU, Anna	
Jackson	Carbondale	88.9	143.1	US 51 north (Illinois Avenue) – Du Quoin	
Williamson	Herrin–Marion line	100.0	160.9	IL 148 – Herrin, Crab Orchard National Wildlife Refuge Information	
Williamson	Marion	103	166	I-57 – Mount Vernon, Cairo	I-57 exit 54
Williamson	Marion	105	169	IL 37 (Court Street) / Lincoln Heritage Trail (Southern Branch) – Johnston City, Cairo	east end of Lincoln Heritage Trail overlap
Williamson		109	175	IL 166 south / Pittsburg Road – Pittsburg, Creal Springs	
Saline	Harrisburg	127	204	IL 34 north (North Main Street) – Harrisburg-Raleigh Airport, Business District	West end of IL 34 overlap
Saline	Harrisburg	128	206	US 45 / IL 34 south (Commercial Street)	East end of IL 34 overlap
Gallatin	Equality	137	220	IL 142 / Lincoln Heritage Trail (Southern Branch) – Eldorado, Equality, Saline County Fish and Wildlife Area, Garden of the Gods	west end of Lincoln Heritage Trail overlap
Gallatin	Lawler	141	227	IL 1 – Omaha, Cave in Rock, Shawnee National Forest Recreation Areas, Cave in Rock State Park	
Gallatin	Old Shawneetown			Lincoln Heritage Trail (Southern Branch) – Old Shawneetown, Shawneetown Bank State Historic Site	east end of Lincoln Heritage Trail overlap
Ohio River		151.54	243.88	Shawneetown Bridge	
Ohio River		151.54	243.88	KY 56 east – Morganfield	Continuation into Kentucky
1.000 mi = 1.609 km; 1.000 km = 0.621 mi: Concurrency terminus; Incomplete access
