= Illinois Route 127 =

North-south state highway in Illinois, US

Illinois Route 127
- IL 127 highlighted in red

Route information
- Maintained by IDOT
- Length: 167.53 mi (269.61 km)
- Existed: 1924–present

Major junctions
- South end: IL 3 in Tamms
- I-64 in Nashville; US 50 in Carlyle; I-70 in Greenville; US 40 in Greenville
- North end: I-55 / IL 48 in Raymond

Location
- Country: United States
- State: Illinois
- Counties: Alexander, Union, Jackson, Perry, Washington, Clinton, Bond, Montgomery

Highway system
- Illinois State Highway System; Interstate; US; State; Tollways; Scenic
← IL 126	→ IL 128

Illinois Route 127 is a north–south highway in central and southern Illinois. Its southern terminus is at Illinois Route 3 near Olive Branch and its northern terminus at Interstate 55, along with the southern terminus of Illinois Route 48 in Raymond. This is a distance of 167.53 miles (269.61 km).

== Route description ==
Illinois 127 parallels U.S. Route 51 for its entire length. U.S. 51 is generally a few miles to the east of Illinois 127, though they never cross. After leaving Alexander County, the route passes through each of the next seven county seats.

Illinois 127 overlaps Illinois Route 146 near Jonesboro, Illinois Route 149 in Murphysboro, Illinois Route 13 from Pinckneyville to Murphysboro, U.S. Route 50 in Carlyle, Illinois Route 140 near Greenville, Illinois Route 16 in Hillsboro and wrong-way with Illinois 48 at its northern terminus. (Illinois 48 is a northbound route at the same time Illinois 127 is marked southbound).

== History ==
SBI Route 127 originally ran from Raymond to Carlyle. In 1937 it was extended to Nashville, replacing Route 153. By 1939 it had been extended to Pinckneyville. In 1944, it was extended west to U.S. Route 66, and south to its current terminus.

A section of Illinois Route 127 south of Carbondale has been designated as the Shawnee Hills Wine Trail by the Illinois state legislature, in commemoration of the region's importance to the Illinois wine industry.

== Major intersections ==
County	Location	mi	km	Destinations	Notes
Alexander		0.0	0.0	IL 3 / Great River Road (National Route) / Lincoln Heritage Trail (Southern Branch) – Cairo, Mounds, Horseshoe Lake	
Union	Jonesboro	23.4	37.7	IL 146 east – Anna, Lincoln Memorial Park	south end of IL 146 overlap; traffic circle around city park
Union	Jonesboro	23.8	38.3	Lincoln Heritage Trail (Southern Branch) (West Market Street) – Court House	south end of Lincoln Heritage Trail overlap
Union		26.0	41.8	IL 146 west / Lincoln Heritage Trail (Southern Branch) – Ware	north end of IL 146 / Lincoln Heritage Trail overlap
Jackson	Murphysboro	48.0	77.2	IL 149 west – Lake Murphysboro State Park, Chester	south end of IL 149 overlap
Jackson	Murphysboro	48.1	77.4	IL 13 east – Carbondale	south end of IL 13 overlap
Jackson	Murphysboro	49.0	78.9	IL 149 east (Sixth Street) – De Soto	north end of IL 149 overlap
Jackson		54.9	88.4	IL 4 north / Truax Traer Road – Ava	
Perry		66.0	106.2	IL 152 east – Du Quoin, Pyramid State Park	
Perry	Pinckneyville	71.6	115.2	IL 13 west / IL 154 – East St. Louis, Sparta, Belleville	north end of IL 13 overlap; half-block overlap with IL 154 east in both directions
Washington	Nashville	90.1	145.0	IL 15	
Washington	Nashville	93.6	150.6	I-64 – East St. Louis, Mount Vernon	I-64 exit 50
Washington	New Minden	97.1	156.3	IL 177 – Okawville, Irvington	
Clinton	Posey	103.8	167.0	IL 161 – Belleville, Centralia	
Clinton	Carlyle	109.4	176.1	US 50 east (Franklin Street) – East St. Louis, Salem	south end of US 50 overlap
Clinton	Carlyle	110.5	177.8	US 50 west – Lebanon	north end of US 50 overlap
Bond		120.5	193.9	IL 143 west – Highland	
Bond	Greenville	127.8	205.7	I-70 – St. Louis, Effingham	I-70 exit 45
Bond	Greenville	128.4	206.6	US 40 – Vandalia	
Bond	Greenville	130.1	209.4	Historic National Road west (South Third Street)	south end of National Road overlap
Bond	Greenville	130.5	210.0	Historic National Road east (North Third Street) / Historic National Road spur (West College Avenue) – Greenville College	north end of National Road overlap
Bond	Greenville	131.1	211.0	IL 140 east – Mulberry Grove	south end of IL 140 overlap
Bond		132.0	212.4	IL 140 west – Alhambra	north end of IL 140 overlap
Montgomery	Taylor Springs	149.5	240.6	IL 185 east – Coffeen	
Montgomery	Hillsboro	150.9	242.9	IL 16 east (School Street) – Pana	south end of IL 16 overlap
Montgomery		153.5	247.0	IL 16 west – Litchfield	north end of IL 16 overlap
Montgomery	Raymond	164.2	264.3	IL 48 north – Taylorville	south end of IL 48 overlap
Montgomery		167.53	269.61	I-55 – East St. Louis, Springfield IL 48 ends	north end of IL 48 overlap; I-55 exit 63
1.000 mi = 1.609 km; 1.000 km = 0.621 mi: Concurrency terminus
