= Illinois Route 153 =

State highway in southern Illinois, US

Illinois Route 153
- IL 153 highlighted in red

Route information
- Maintained by IDOT
- Length: 18.35 mi (29.53 km)
- Existed: 1926–present

Major junctions
- South end: IL 154 in Sparta
- North end: IL 15 in Addieville

Location
- Country: United States
- State: Illinois
- Counties: Randolph, Washington

Highway system
- Illinois State Highway System; Interstate; US; State; Tollways; Scenic
← IL 152	→ IL 154

Illinois Route 153 is a north–south state road in southern Illinois. It runs from Illinois Route 154 in Eden to Illinois Route 15 in rural Washington County. This is a distance of 18.35 miles (29.53 km).

== Route description ==
Illinois 153 runs northeast from Eden to Coulterville, where it overlaps Illinois Route 13 through the central part of town. Illinois 153 is a rural, two-lane surface road for its entire length.

== History ==
SBI Route 153 originally ran from Eden to Irvington along what is now Illinois 153, Illinois Route 15, Illinois Route 127, and Illinois Route 177 to U.S. Route 51. In 1937 the above routes took over Illinois 153, and Illinois 153 was truncated to Illinois Route 160 in Plum Hill. In 1938 it was truncated further to its current northern end. The next year, Illinois 153 was extended south to Sparta; at some point in the future, this was dropped.

== Major intersections ==
County	Location	mi	km	Destinations	Notes
Randolph	Eden	0.0	0.0	IL 154	
Randolph	Coulterville	5.8	9.3	IL 13 east (Grant Street)	South end of IL 13 overlap
Randolph	Coulterville	6.1	9.8	IL 13 west	North end of IL 13 overlap
Washington		18.3	29.5	IL 15	
1.000 mi = 1.609 km; 1.000 km = 0.621 mi: Concurrency terminus
