= Perry County Courthouse (Illinois) =

Local government building in the United States

Coordinates: 38°4′50″N 89°22′55″W

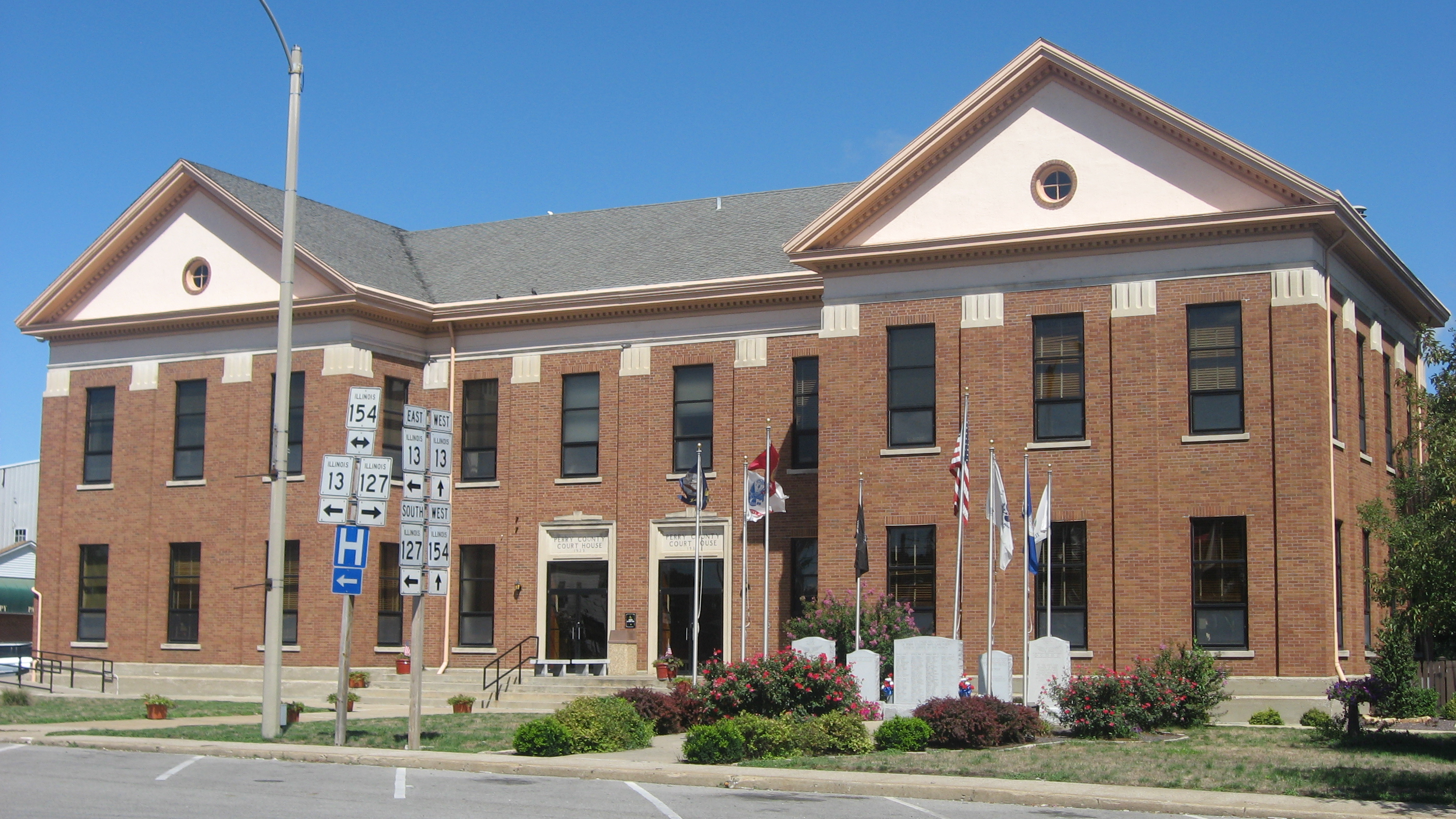
Main Street view of the courthouse facade

The Perry County Courthouse is a government building in central Pinckneyville, the county seat of Perry County, Illinois, United States. Built in 1850, it is the third courthouse in the county's history, and it has been twice expanded to serve the county's growing needs.

== Early history ==
Perry County was created from pieces of Randolph and Jackson counties by an 1827 law. This law provided for a commission to choose an undeveloped location to become the county seat and directed that this location be named "Pinckneyville". Additionally, it specified that until a permanent location were chosen, the county government should meet at the home of one Amos Anderson, who lived about a mile south of the location eventually chosen as county seat. Pinckneyville was platted in January 1828, and within a month county officials ordered the construction of a new courthouse. When completed in September 1828, it was a two-story log building measuring 18 by 22 feet (5.5 m × 6.7 m); the county paid contractor Berry Anderson $54. In late 1835, the county commissioners announced plans to build a larger brick courthouse, 35 feet (11 m) on each side, and two stories tall; many county residents protested this move because of county finances, but construction finished in late 1837. Contractor Amos Anderson and associated craftsmen were paid more than $2,600.

== New courthouse ==
Despite the high construction cost, the 1837 courthouse was poorly built: by 1840 the doors and windows had to be repaired so that they could no longer be opened from outside, and in 1849, more than five hundred county voters petitioned the commissioners for a replacement building. This structure, the third in the county's history, measured 36 by 46 feet (11 m × 14 m) and was built of brick with Tuscan columns; it was completed in 1850 at a cost of $6,000. Even this building was insufficient, giving no protection against fire, and little protection against evilly disposed individuals: many valuable papers mysteriously disappeared, and cases coming for trial were often postponed because documentation went missing. Voters rejected a tax levy for courthouse expansion in the November 1877 election, but popular opinion quickly reversed, and by April 1878, more than 1,000 voters had requested what they had recently opposed at the polls. Pinckneyville general contractor William Wilson oversaw construction for a fee of $9,742, and the county took possession of the finished addition in April 1879.

== Expansion ==
Measuring 45 by 36 feet (14 m × 11 m), the new section gave the courthouse a facade 81 feet (25 m) long. The original section, a gabled structure oriented toward the street, is three bays wide and four long, while the addition is oriented in a perpendicular direction and features four bays with pilasters similar to those of the original. A second addition was completed in 1939, attached to the other end of the 1879 addition; from the street, the original sits on the left, the 1939 addition to the right, and the 1879 addition in the middle. The simple gable of the original has been rebuilt to a distinctive pediment, the short space between the pediment and the pilasters has been reworked into a plain entablature, and the 1939 addition features similar elements. An oculus pierces each of the two pediments. While the main entrance once sat in the middle bay of the original courthouse's facade, the spot has been converted into a window, and twin entrances have since been placed in the middle of the 1879 addition. Between the building and the street lies a simple park with a collection of war memorials.
