= Don Welge Memorial Bridge =

Future bridge in Chester, Illinois

- Coordinates: 37.90287°N 89.83748°W
- Carries: 2 lanes of Route 51/ IL 150
- Crosses: Mississippi River
- Locale: Perryville, Missouri and Chester, Illinois
- Official name: Don Welge Memorial Bridge
- Other name: New Chester Bridge
- Maintained by: Missouri Department of Transportation

Characteristics
- Design: Cable-stayed bridge

History
- Construction start: September 5, 2023
- Construction end: July 9, 2026
- Construction cost: $307 million
- Opened: July 13, 2026
- Replaces: Chester Bridge

Statistics
- Toll: None

Location
- Interactive map of Don Welge Memorial Bridge

The Don Welge Memorial Bridge is a cable-stayed bridge across the Mississippi River, which connects Perryville, Missouri and Chester, Illinois using Missouri's Route 51 and Illinois's Route 150. It is the successor to the Chester Bridge, which was built in 1942 and reconstructed in 1946 after a severe thunderstorm destroyed the main span.

The bridge is named after Don Welge, a former Chester resident and longtime advocate for a new bridge for the last 15 years of his life until his death in 2020. The first plans for a new bridge were developed in March 2018, and construction began in September 2023.

== See also ==
- List of crossings of the Upper Mississippi River
