= Eden, Randolph County, Illinois =

Eden, Illinois
- Unincorporated community
- Location within Illinois Location within the United States
- Coordinates: 38°07′14″N 89°40′03″W
- Country: United States
- State: Illinois
- County: Randolph
- Elevation: 535 ft (163 m)
- Time zone: UTC-6 (Central (CST))
  - Summer (DST): UTC-5 (CDT)
- Area code: 618
- GNIS feature ID: 407764

Eden is an unincorporated community in Randolph County, Illinois, United States. Eden is located at the junction of Illinois Route 153 and Illinois Route 154, 1.9 miles (3.1 km) east of Sparta.

The community is best known for supposedly containing a "station" (safe house) for escaped slaves along the Underground Railroad coming up from Chester on their way to Canada during the American Civil War.
