= Du Quoin State Fairgrounds =

- U.S. National Register of Historic Places
- U.S. Historic district
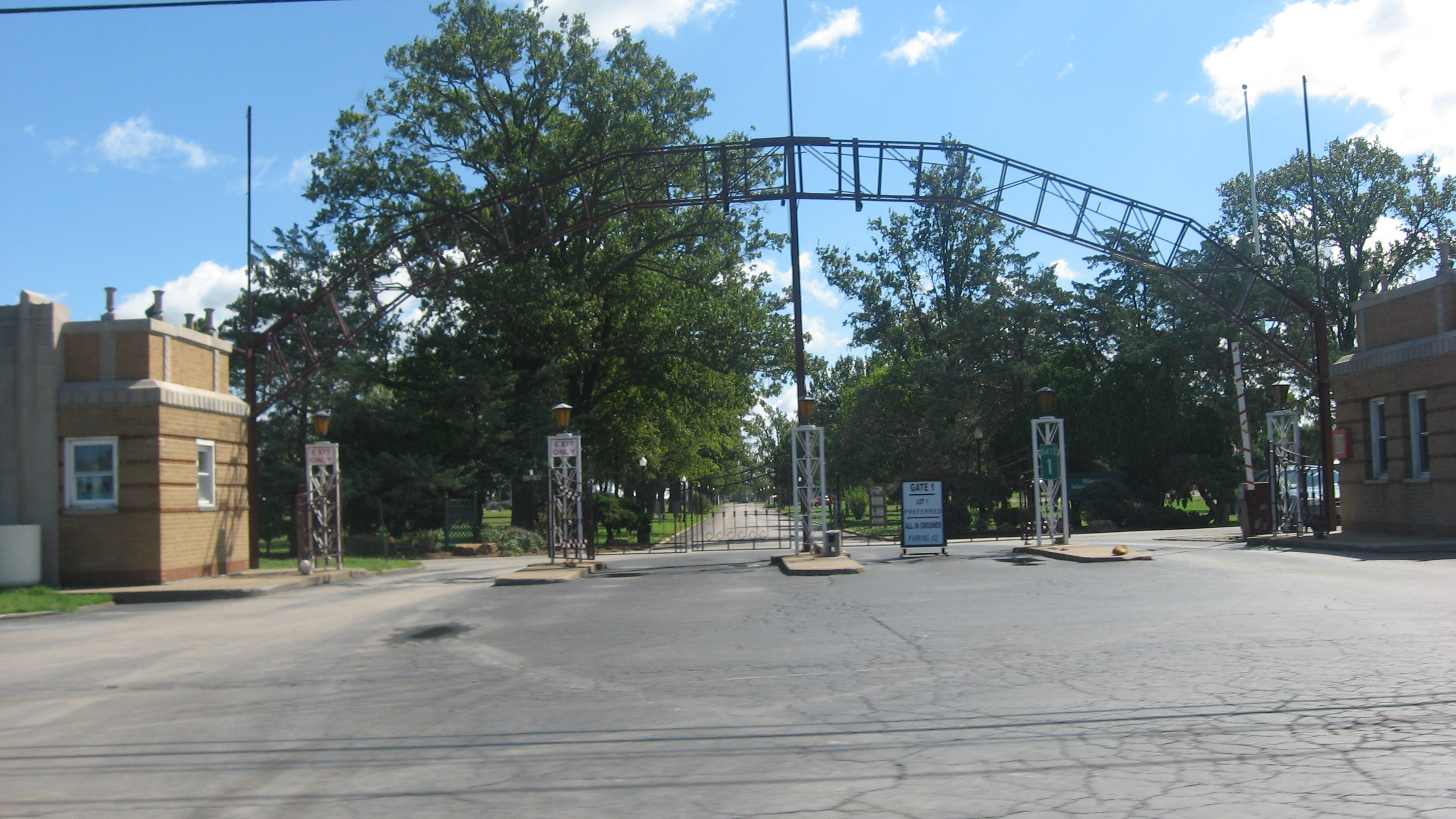
- Entrance to the fairgrounds

- Location within Illinois
- Location: US 51 N of jct. with SR 14, Du Quoin, Illinois, United States
- Coordinates: 38°0′25″N 89°14′6″W
- Area: 179 acres (72 ha)
- Built: 1923
- Architect: Oliver W. Stiegemeyer
- Architectural style: Moderne, Art Deco
- MPS: Historic Fairgrounds in Illinois MPS
- NRHP reference No.: 90000719
- Added to NRHP: July 11, 1990

The Du Quoin State Fairgrounds are located in the city of Du Quoin in Perry County, Illinois, United States. The fairgrounds are located along U.S. Route 51 north of Illinois Route 14. The facilities include the DuQuoin State Fairgrounds Racetrack, an oval track that has hosted AAA, USAC and ARCA races since 1948. The fairgrounds are also home to a horse racing track which hosted the Hambletonian Stakes from 1957 to 1980 and the World Trotting Derby from 1981 to 2009.

The Du Quoin State Fairgrounds opened in 1923 under the leadership of horse breeder William R. Hayes. Hayes created the DuQuoin State Fair as a parallel event to the Illinois State Fair, which had banned gambling on horse races. To avoid competing for visitors, the Du Quoin State Fair began immediately after the Illinois State Fair closed; the Du Quoin fair traditionally ran through Labor Day weekend. The event was a financial success which attracted prominent entertainers and groups, many of whom also played the Illinois State Fair; the fair consequently became known as Illinois' "little State Fair" or "second State Fair".

Du Quoin State Fairgrounds has been listed on the National Register of Historic Places since July 1990. It is one of Perry County's two Registered Historic Places; the other, in Pinckneyville, is the Perry County Jail, now a museum.
