= Indiana State Road 441 =

State highway in Indiana, United States

State Road 441
- SR 441 highlighted in red

Route information
- Maintained by INDOT
- Length: 2.594 mi (4.175 km)

Major junctions
- South end: US 41 just south of Vincennes
- North end: To IL 33 at the state line on the Lincoln Memorial Bridge

Location
- Country: United States
- State: Indiana
- Counties: Knox

Highway system
- Indiana State Highway System; Interstate; US; State; Scenic
← SR 427	→ SR 445

State Road 441 (SR 441) is a part of the Indiana State Road that runs through Vincennes in the US state of Indiana. The 2.61 miles (4.20 km) of SR 441 that lie within Indiana serve as a minor highway. None of the highway is listed on the National Highway System. Most of the route is an urban two-lane highway. The highway passes through residential and commercial properties.

== Route description ==
SR 441 begins on the south side of Vincennes at an interchange with US 41. It passes northwest, as a two-lane highway, through Vincennes where it is concurrent with Willow Street, passing through commercial properties. The road turns northeast onto Sixth Street and passes through a mix of commercial and residential properties. The route enters downtown Vincennes and turns northwest onto Vigo Street. The highway ends at the Illinois / Indiana state line on the Lincoln Memorial Bridge that crosses the Wabash River near the George Rogers Clark National Historical Park. In Illinois the road serves as an access road to Illinois Route 33.

No segment of State Road 441 in Indiana is included in the National Highway System (NHS). The NHS is a network of highways that are identified as being most important for the economy, mobility and defense of the nation. The highway is maintained by the Indiana Department of Transportation (INDOT) like all other state roads in the state. The department tracks the traffic volumes along all state roads as a part of its maintenance responsibilities using a metric called average annual daily traffic (AADT). This measurement is a calculation of the traffic level along a segment of roadway for any average day of the year. In 2010, INDOT figured that lowest traffic levels were 7,350 vehicles and 450 commercial vehicles used the highway daily on the Lincoln Memorial Bridge. The peak traffic volumes were 10,270 vehicles and 1,070 commercial vehicles AADT along the section of SR 441 near its southern terminus.

== Major intersections ==
County	Location	mi	km	Destinations	Notes
Knox	Vincennes	0.000– 0.175	0.000– 0.282	US 41 – Evansville, Terre Haute	Southern terminus of SR 441
Wabash River		2.594	4.175	Lincoln Memorial Bridge (state line)	
Lawrence	Allison Township	2.594	4.175	To IL 33 / Lincoln Heritage Trail	
1.000 mi = 1.609 km; 1.000 km = 0.621 mi
