= Illinois Route 151 =

State highway in Jackson County, Illinois, US

Illinois Route 151
- IL 151 highlighted in red

Route information
- Maintained by IDOT
- Length: 7.84 mi (12.62 km)
- Existed: 1940–present

Major junctions
- South end: IL 3 in Jacob
- North end: IL 4 in Ava

Location
- Country: United States
- State: Illinois
- Counties: Jackson

Highway system
- Illinois State Highway System; Interstate; US; State; Tollways; Scenic
← IL 150	→ IL 152

Illinois Route 151 is a north–south state road in southern Illinois located entirely within Jackson County. It runs from Illinois Route 3 in rural Jackson County to Illinois Route 4 in Ava. This is a distance of 7.84 miles (12.62 km).

== Route description ==
Illinois 151 serves as a connector through the northwest portion of Shawnee National Forest. It also is the access road to the Jackson Creek Recreational Area.

== History ==
SBI Route 151 originally ran from Steeleville to Murphysboro; this was absorbed into Illinois Route 43 in 1937, and eventually became part of Illinois 4 in 1964. In 1940, Illinois 151 was placed onto its current route.

== Major intersections ==
The entire route is in Jackson County.

Location	mi	km	Destinations	Notes
Jacob	0.00	0.00	IL 3 / Great River Road	
Ava	7.84	12.62	IL 4	
1.000 mi = 1.609 km; 1.000 km = 0.621 mi
