= IL-13 =

IL-13 or IL 13 can refer to:

- Interleukin 13
- Illinois's 13th congressional district
- Illinois Route 13
