= Illinois Route 152 =

State highway in Perry County, Illinois, US

Illinois Route 152
- Main Street
- IL 152 highlighted in red

Route information
- Maintained by IDOT
- Length: 6.76 mi (10.88 km)
- Existed: 1924–present

Major junctions
- West end: IL 13 / IL 127 in Pyatts
- East end: US 51 in Du Quoin

Location
- Country: United States
- State: Illinois
- Counties: Perry

Highway system
- Illinois State Highway System; Interstate; US; State; Tollways; Scenic
← IL 151	→ IL 153

Illinois Route 152 is an east–west state road entirely within Perry County, Illinois. It connects Illinois Route 13 and Illinois Route 127 at its western terminus with U.S. Route 51 in Du Quoin at its eastern terminus. This is a distance of 6.76 miles (10.88 km). According to the Illinois Department of Transportation, daily traffic on IL 152 is 2650 on the western half and 2800 on the eastern half.

== Route description ==
IL 152 begins in Pyatts at a four-way rural intersection. Perry County Route 4 continues west past the intersection, and the concurrency of IL 13 and IL 127 heads north and south. The highway, which is locally known as Main Street for its entire length, heads east from this intersection toward Du Quoin. It intersects with several local roads and crosses two creeks before meeting Perry County Route 25 at a 3-way intersection 4.8 miles (7.7 km) from its western end. After passing CR 25, the road heads northeast for a short distance before turning east into Du Quoin. It terminates at a four-way intersection with U.S. Route 51 and Perry County Route 7 on the west side of Du Quoin, a distance of 6.76 miles (10.88 km) from its start. CR 7 picks up the Main Street name and continues east into downtown Du Quoin, and US 51 travels north and south from the junction. IL 152 is one of the shorter routes on the Illinois State Highway System.

== History ==
The road which is currently Route 152 first appeared on Illinois highway maps in 1924, though it was not marked at the time. This road was removed from the state highway map in 1926 and returned to the map in 1928 as Route 152. The routing of Illinois 152 has not changed since its inception as part of the second set of SBI Routes in 1924.

== Major intersections ==
The entire route is in Perry County.

Location	mi	km	Destinations	Notes
Pyatts	0.00	0.00	IL 13 / IL 127	
Du Quoin	6.76	10.88	US 51 (Hickory Street)	
1.000 mi = 1.609 km; 1.000 km = 0.621 mi
