= Albert Brown (American veteran) =

American World War II prisoner of war (1905–2011)

- Born: October 26, 1905; North Platte, Nebraska, US
- Died: August 14, 2011 (aged 105) Nashville, Illinois, US
- Branch: United States Army
- Known for: oldest survivor of the Bataan Death March
- Conflicts: World War II

Albert "Doc" Brown (October 26, 1905 – August 14, 2011) was an American dentist, and served as an officer in the United States Army in World War II, where he became a prisoner of war. At the age of 105, Brown was the oldest survivor of the Bataan Death March at the time of his death in 2011.

== Biography ==
=== Early life ===
Brown was born on October 26, 1905, in North Platte, Nebraska, to parents, Albert and Ida Fonda Brown. His mother was the aunt of actor Henry Fonda. His father was a railroad engineer. Brown was also the godson of Buffalo Bill. He often related the story of sitting on Bill Cody's lap while they shared a bowl of oatmeal.

Following his father's death in a locomotive explosion, Brown was raised in Council Bluffs, Iowa. He joined the R.O.T.C. in high school. Brown received a bachelor's degree in dentistry from Creighton University in Omaha, Nebraska, in 1927. Dr. Brown was the captain of the Creighton football and basketball teams.

=== World War II ===
Brown was drafted into active duty in the military in 1937. He left his wife, Helen, children and dental practice behind.

Brown and thousands of American and Filipino troops were captured following the Japanese invasion of the Philippines. He survived the Bataan Death March, in which the Japanese forced 78,000 Allied prisoners of war to march 65 miles from Bataan to a POW camp without food, water or medical attention. An estimated 11,000 prisoners died during the march, including those who were killed when they fell in the jungle. Brown recorded the events he witnessed in secret using a small writing tablet and pencil hidden inside his canvas bag's lining. He witnessed the killing of Filipinos who had attempted to throw fruit to the prisoners in the march.

Following the Bataan Death March, Brown endured a three-year imprisonment in a Japanese POW camp from 1942 until he was liberated in the middle of September 1945. He ate nothing but rice while in the camp. Brown became afflicted with more than twelve diseases while in the camp, including dengue fever, malaria and dysentery. He also suffered a broken neck and back. He was released from the camp when he was 40 years old. He was nearly blind from maltreatment and had lost more than eighty pounds, then weighing less than one hundred pounds. A doctor told Brown that he would not live to be 50 years old due to the extent of his injuries. However, he lived to be 105 years old.

=== Post-war years ===
Brown moved to Los Angeles, California, after World War II. He was unable to return to dentistry or reopen his practice due to the injuries he sustained in the march and the POW camp. Instead, Brown returned to college and became involved in rental properties, which he purchased and became a landlord. He rented houses and other properties to some of Hollywood's major figures of the time, including Olivia de Havilland and Joan Fontaine. He developed personal friendships with Roy Rogers and John Wayne. He even read for some screen tests while dabbling in acting.

He later moved from California to southern Illinois in 1998, settling in the town of Pinckneyville to live with his daughter. He did not openly discuss his experience on the Bataan Death March until the 1990s, approximately fifteen to twenty years before his death. In 2007, Brown was recognized as the oldest living survivor of the Bataan Death March by the American Defenders of Bataan and Corregidor, a veterans organization. The American War Library, which is located in Gardena, California, also named Brown as the oldest living World War II veteran at the time, though that has never been confirmed by other organizations. His experience during the march and war was chronicled in the 2011 book, Heroes of the Pacific War: One Man's True Story, by Kevin Moore and Don Morrow.

Albert Brown died in a nursing home in Nashville, Illinois, on August 14, 2011, at the age of 105. His wife of fifty-eight years, Helen Johnson Brown, died in 1985.

The British rock band XTC, working under the pseudonym The Dukes of Stratosphear, recorded an ironic tribute to Brown on their 1987 album Psionic Sunspot, titled "You're a Good Man Albert Brown (Curse You Red Barrel)."
