= Illinois Route 150 =

State highway in southern Illinois, US

Illinois Route 150
- IL 150 highlighted in red

Route information
- Maintained by IDOT
- Length: 24.19 mi (38.93 km)
- Existed: 1926–present

Major junctions
- West end: Route 51 in Chester
- East end: IL 154 in Cutler

Location
- Country: United States
- State: Illinois
- Counties: Randolph, Perry

Highway system
- Illinois State Highway System; Interstate; US; State; Tollways; Scenic
← US 150	→ IL 151

Illinois Route 150 (IL 150) is a 24.19-mile-long (38.93 km) east–west state road in southern Illinois. It runs from the Chester Bridge, a truss bridge over the Mississippi River to Route 51 in the state of Missouri, to IL 154 in rural Perry County well west of Pinckneyville.

== Route description ==
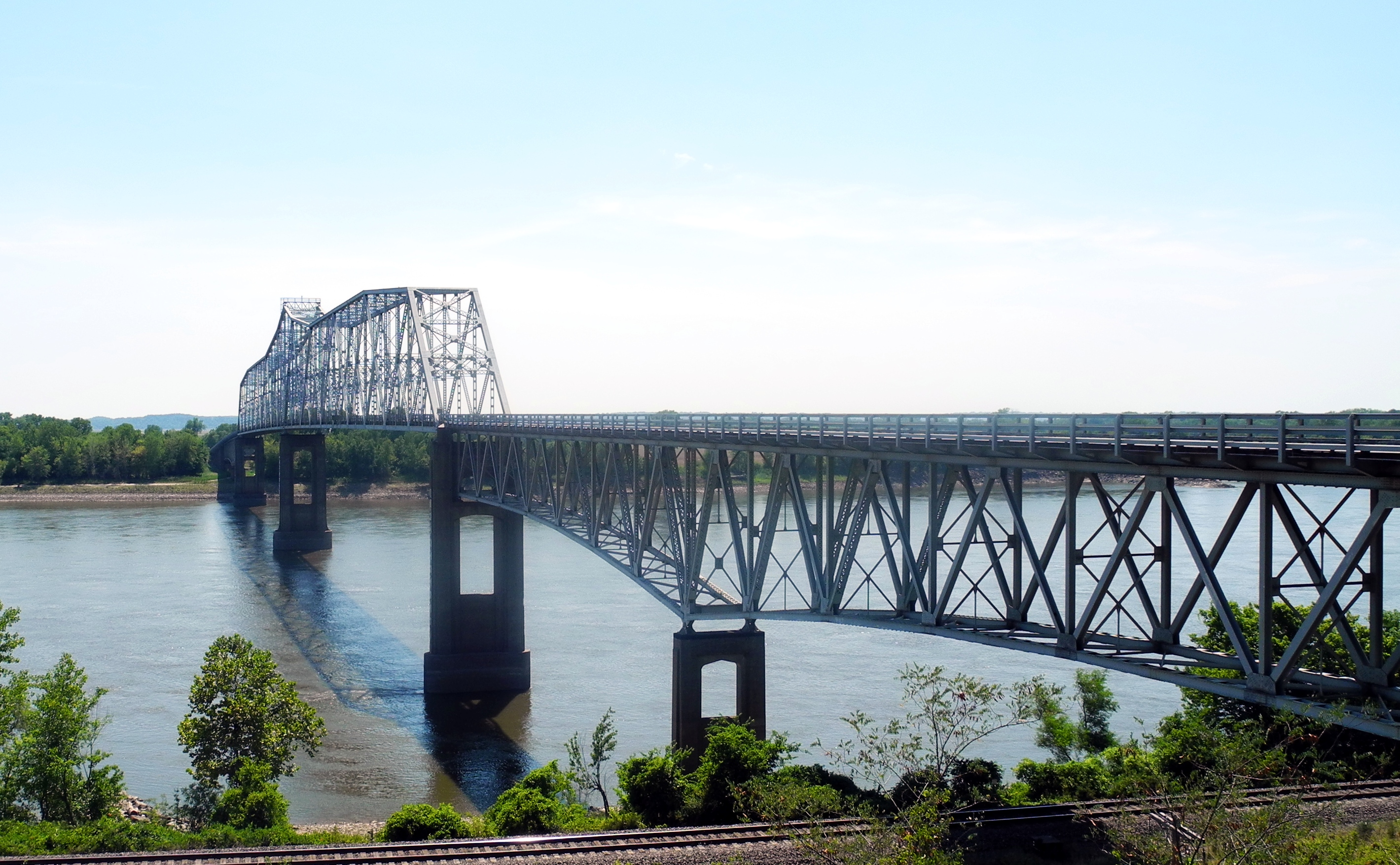
View of the Chester Bridge on the Mississippi River

Illinois 150 generally runs southwest to northeast, but is marked as an east–west route. From the Chester Bridge, it runs northeast through Chester, briefly overlapping Illinois Route 3. A longer concurrency takes place further northeast at Illinois Route 4. East of Percy, Illinois 150 turns north to Illinois 154. In Chester, it is named State Street.

== History ==
SBI Route 150 originally ran from the US 51/60/62 bridges south of Cairo north to Hamel (located northeast of Saint Louis, Missouri) on what is now Illinois Route 3, the portion of Illinois 150 from Chester to Steeleville, and Illinois Route 4.

In 1937, the changes from Illinois 150 to Illinois 3 and 4 took place (the change to Illinois 4 initially was a change to Illinois Route 43). Illinois 150 then was extended east and west (replacing what was then Illinois Route 151) to its current length.

== Major intersections ==
County	Location	mi	km	Destinations	Notes
Mississippi River		0.00	0.00	Route 51 south – Perryville	Continuation into Missouri
Mississippi River		0.00	0.00	Chester Bridge; Missouri–Illinois state line	
Randolph	Chester	1.18	1.90	IL 3 south	Western end of IL 3 overlap
Randolph	Chester	1.29	2.08	IL 3 north	Eastern end of IL 3 overlap
Randolph		12.08	19.44	IL 4 north	Western end of IL 4 overlap
Randolph–Perry county line		18.31	29.47	IL 4 south	Eastern end of IL 4 overlap
Perry	Cutler Precinct	24.19	38.93	IL 154	
1.000 mi = 1.609 km; 1.000 km = 0.621 mi: Concurrency terminus
