= Perry County Jail =

- U.S. National Register of Historic Places
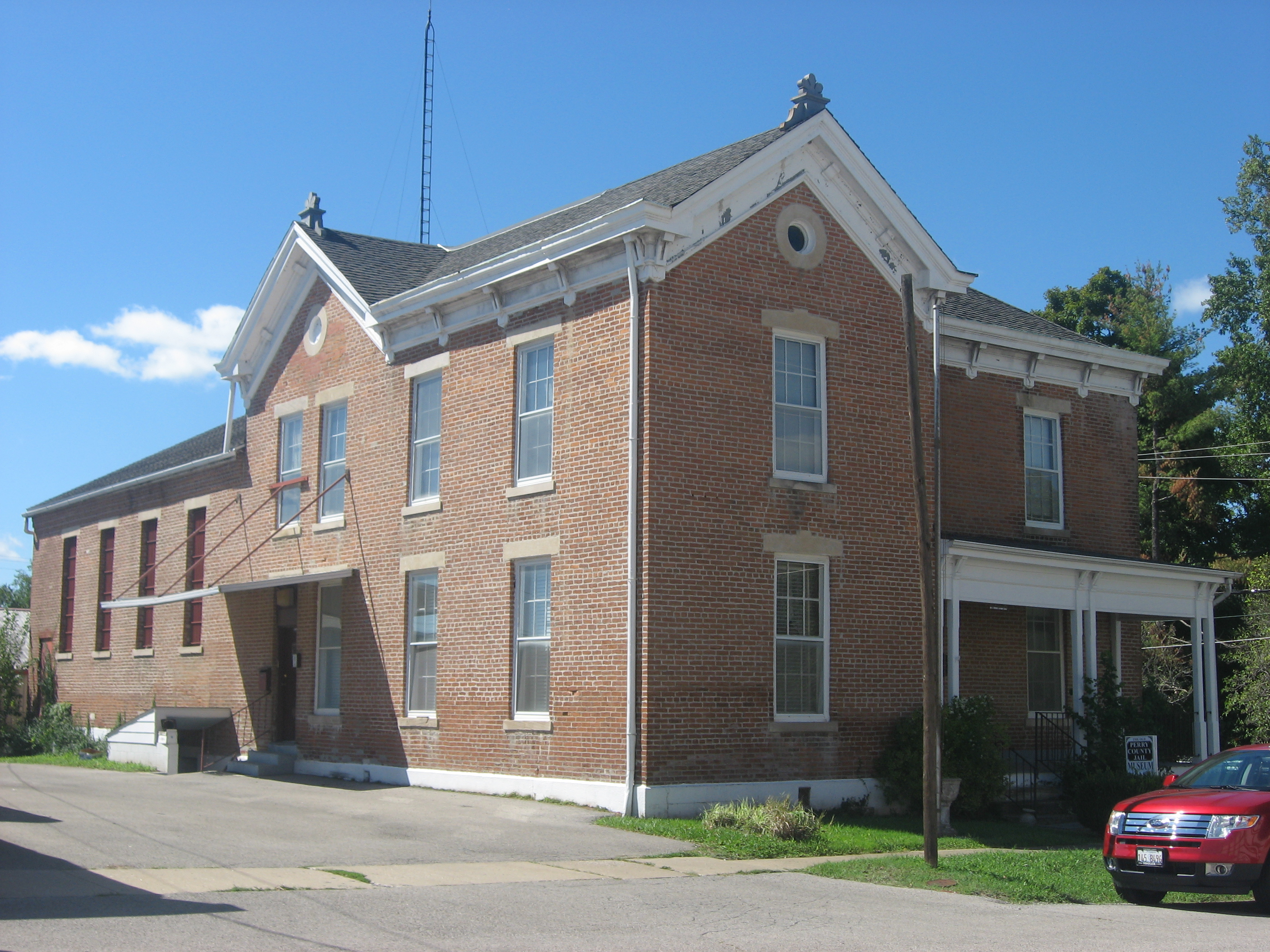
- Front and eastern side

- Location within Illinois Location within the United States
- Location: 108 W. Jackson St., Pinckneyville, Illinois
- Coordinates: 38°4′50″N 89°23′0″W
- Area: less than one acre
- Architect: Samuel Hannaford; E. Haugh
- Architectural style: Italianate
- NRHP reference No.: 00000943
- Added to NRHP: August 10, 2000

The Perry County Jail, also known as the Perry County Jail Museum, is a history museum and historic jail in Pinckneyville, Illinois. Built in 1871, the jail was the second county jail used by Perry County. The county's first jail was built in 1833-34 and was demolished to make room for the new jail; it was a two-story brick building measuring 14 by 16 feet (4.3 m × 4.9 m) on the interior, and it cost $750 to build. The legislature passed two separate private laws to enable Perry County to obtain funds for the second jail's construction: one in 1865 to permit a tax levy, and the other in 1867 to permit the issuance of bonds. Although the county quickly solicited architects' plans upon being permitted to issue bonds, four years passed before they announced their choice of the design created by Cincinnati architect Samuel Hannaford. The contractor was chosen in May, a superintendent named in July, and the building deemed complete in December.

The new brick jail was built by contractor E. Hough of Indianapolis for $14,150. The county sheriff's residence was attached to the jail, an arrangement which allowed the sheriff to oversee the jail at all times. The county used the jail until 1987, when a newer jail was built. The building housed county offices until 1993, when the Perry County Historical Society leased the building for a museum.

The building was added to the National Register of Historic Places on August 10, 2000. It is one of two properties in Perry County on the National Register, along with the Du Quoin State Fairgrounds in Du Quoin.
