= Chester Bridge =

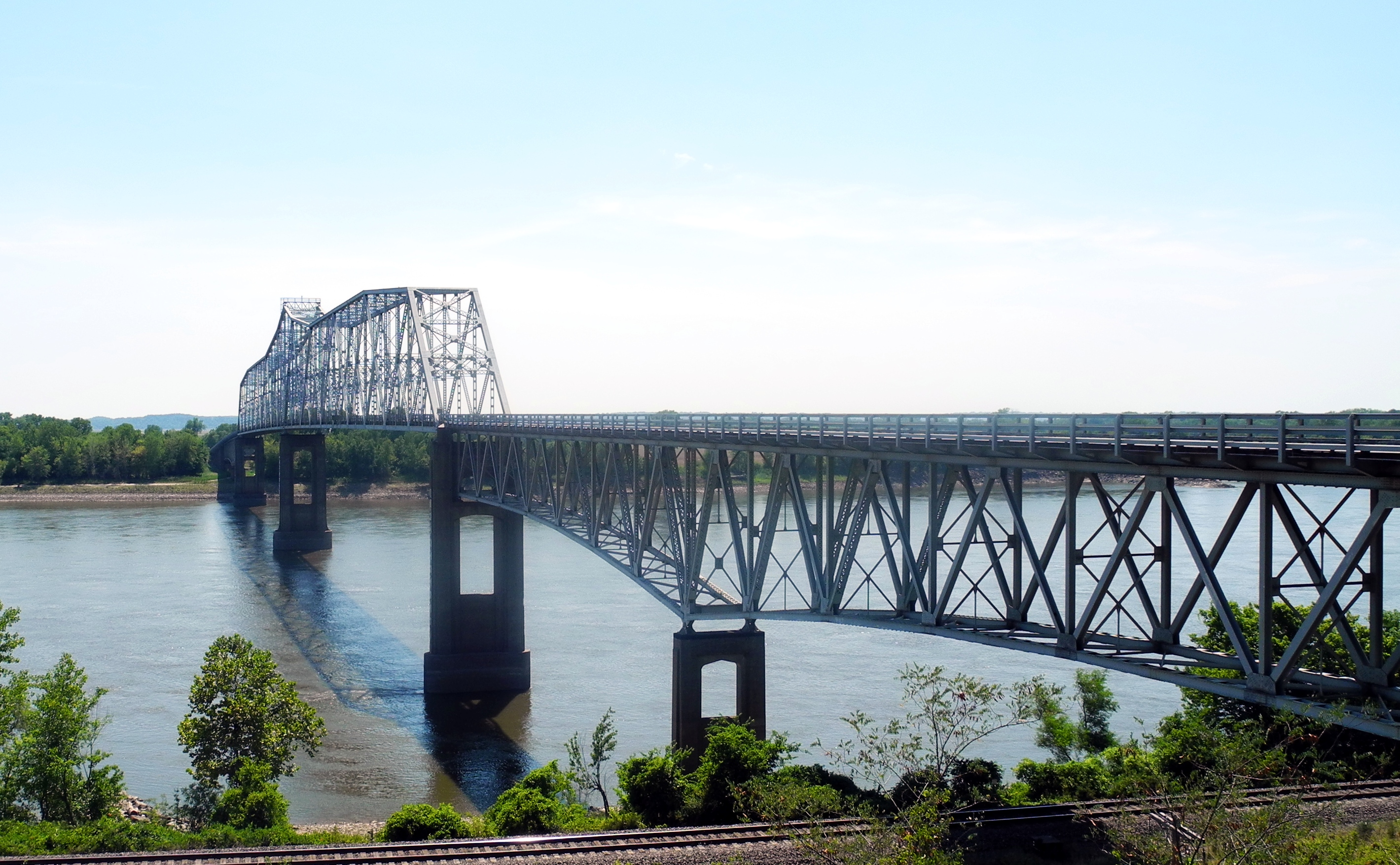
- Chester Bridge in July 2012
- Coordinates: 37°54′11″N 89°50′11″W
- Carries: 2 lanes of Route 51/ IL 150
- Crosses: Mississippi River
- Locale: Perryville, Missouri and Chester, Illinois
- Maintained by: Missouri Department of Transportation

Characteristics
- Design: Continuous truss bridge
- Total length: 2,826 feet (861 m)
- Width: 22 feet (7 m)
- Longest span: 670 feet (204 m)
- Clearance below: 104 feet (32 m)

History
- Opened: August 23, 1942
- Closed: July 27, 2026

Statistics
- Daily traffic: 7,000
- Toll: None

Location
- Interactive map of Chester Bridge

The Chester Bridge was a continuous truss bridge connecting Missouri's Route 51 with Illinois Route 150 across the Mississippi River between Perryville, Missouri and Chester, Illinois. It was the only motor-traffic bridge spanning the Mississippi River between St. Louis and Cape Girardeau, Missouri.

== History ==
Located at river mile marker 109.5, the Chester Bridge was a two-lane traffic truss bridge which was constructed by Sverdrup and Parcel and Associates, Inc. of St. Louis. Construction began in 1941 and was finished in 1942 at a cost of $1.385 million (1942 dollars). The bridge opened on August 23, 1942, and operated as a toll bridge until January 1, 1989. It replaced a ferry service that had been used to cross the river for many years. The bridge was constructed by the Massman Construction Company and designed as a cantilever structure, which allows for longer spans without the need for supporting piers in the river channel, a key feature in large river crossings. The main span was destroyed by a severe tornadic force thunderstorm on July 29, 1944. The span was reconstructed at a cost of $148,000 and reopened in August 1946.

== Future ==
The first plans for a new bridge were developed in March 2018. Inspections in 2020 showed the bridge structure to be "functionally obsolete" and in poor condition, requiring a weight limit of 25 tons. The Missouri Department of Transportation originally planned to replace the bridge by 2028, but shortened the time-frame to 2026. Construction on a new bridge began in September 2023. The new bridge, the Don Welge Memorial Bridge, will be a more modern cable-stayed bridge. The estimated cost of the replacement bridge is approximately $284 million.

== Chester Welcome Center ==
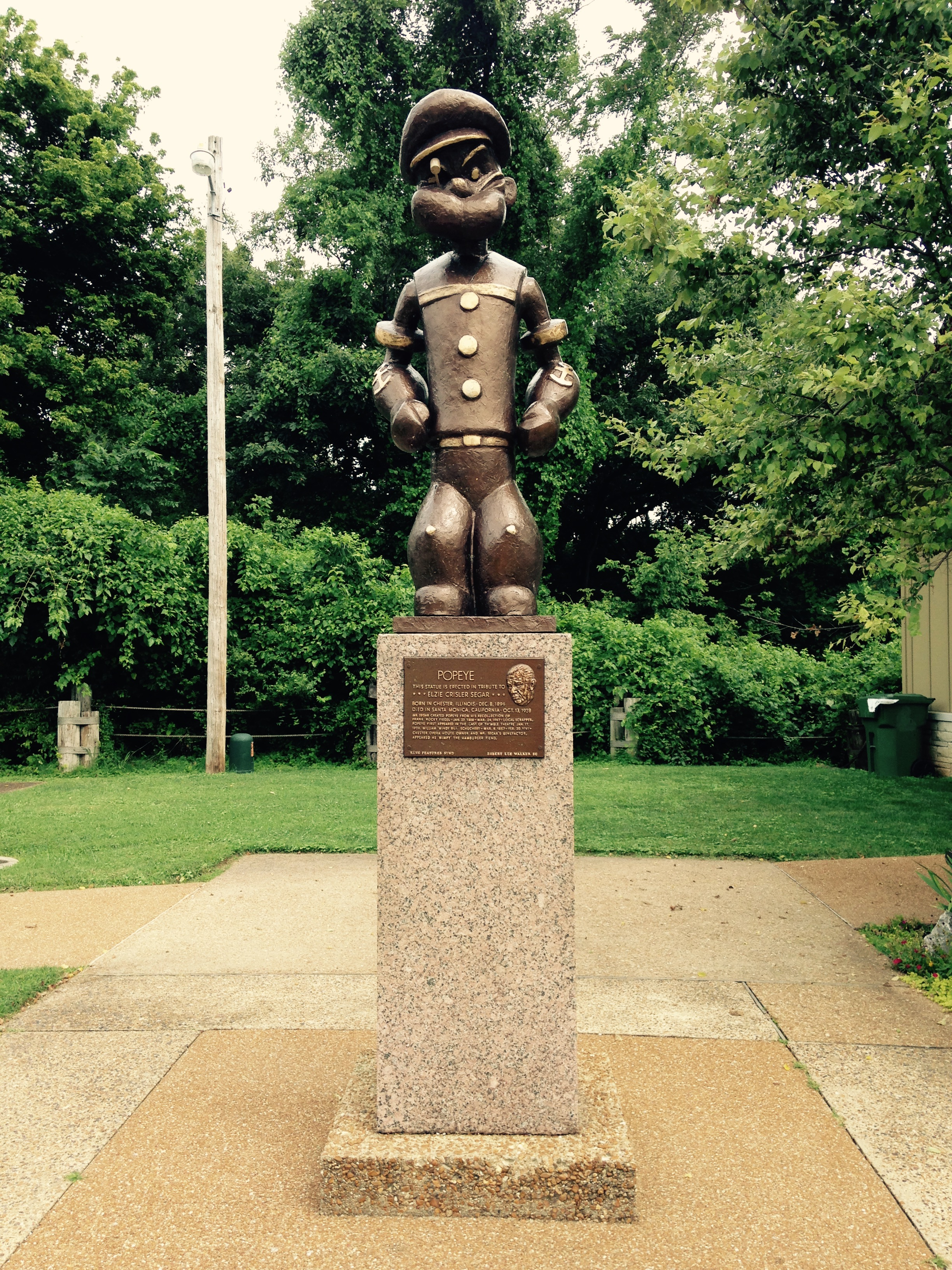
Popeye

The Chester Welcome Center is located in Segar Park next to the Chester Bridge and overlooks the Mississippi River. The park was dedicated to E. C. Segar who was born on December 8, 1894, in Chester, Illinois. Segar is most noted for his cartoon comic "Popeye” which he created in 1929 from his recollections of a local scrapper on the Mississippi River. A six-foot “life-size” bronze statue of Popeye stands near the bridge.

== Popular culture ==
The Chester Bridge can be seen in the 1967 film In the Heat of the Night, although in the film a highway sign for the (non-existent) "Arkansas 49" highway appears on the east (Illinois) side of the bridge.

== Gallery ==
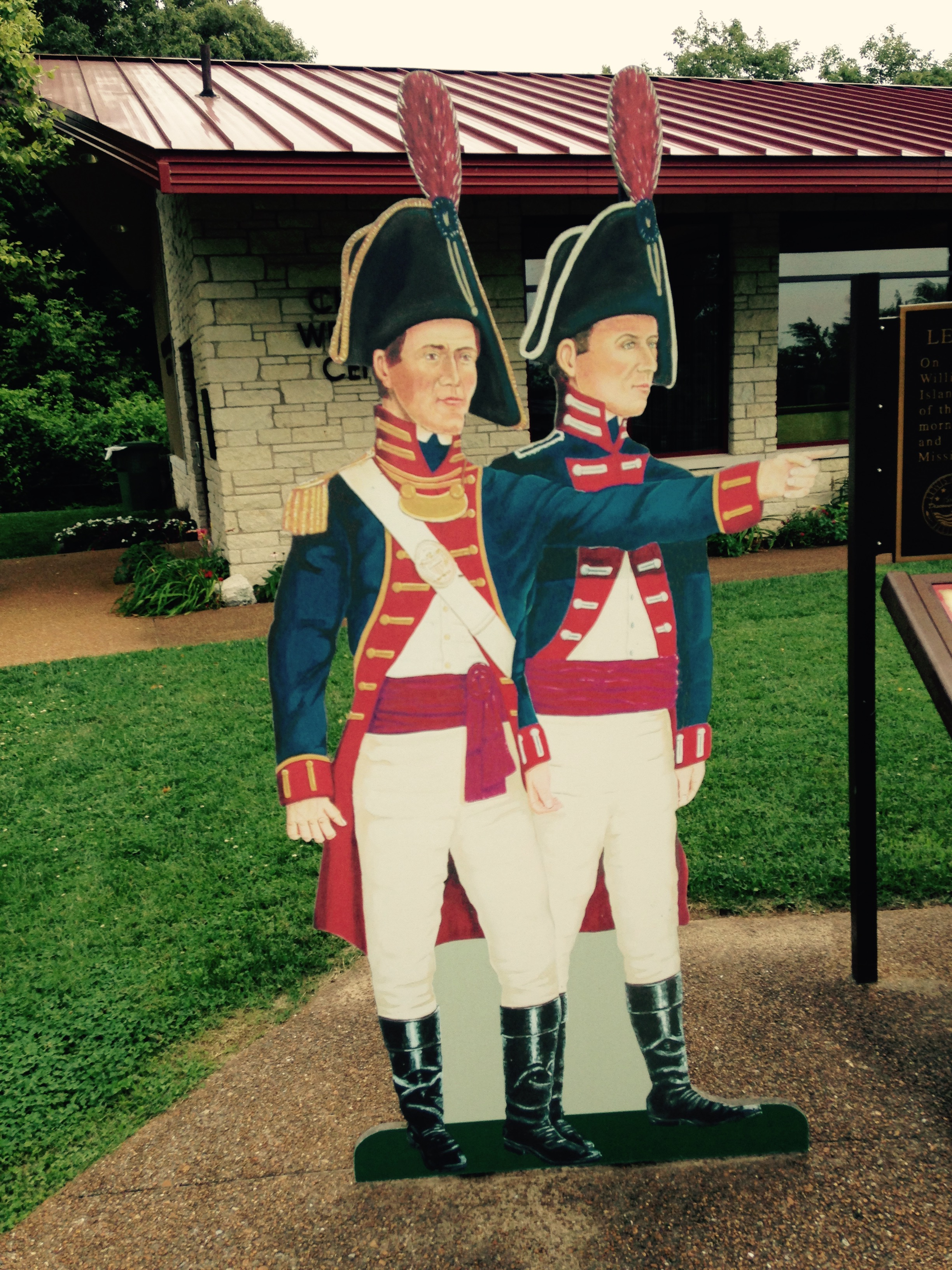
Lewis and Clark

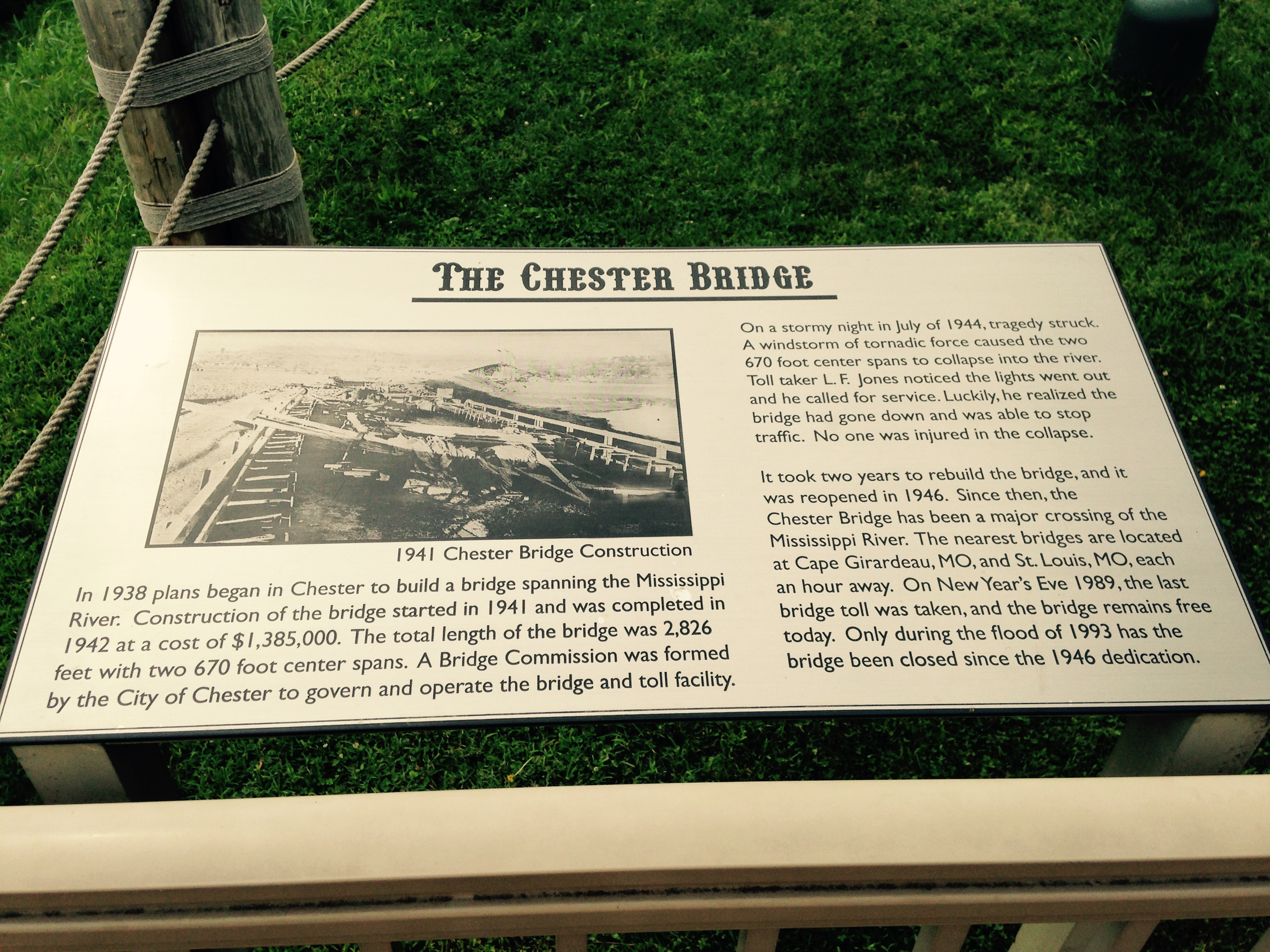
Chester Bridge plaque

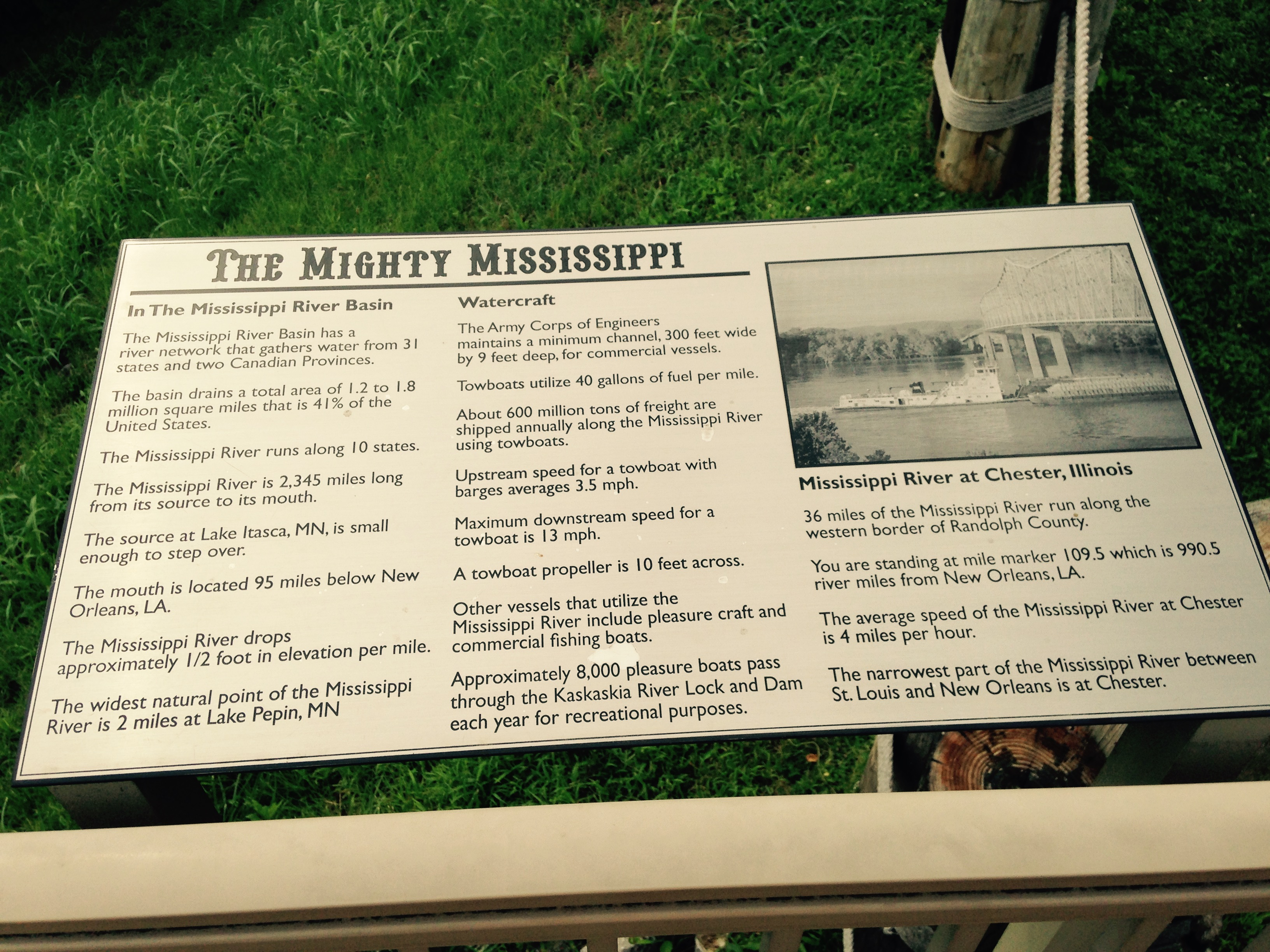
Mighty Mississippi River plaque

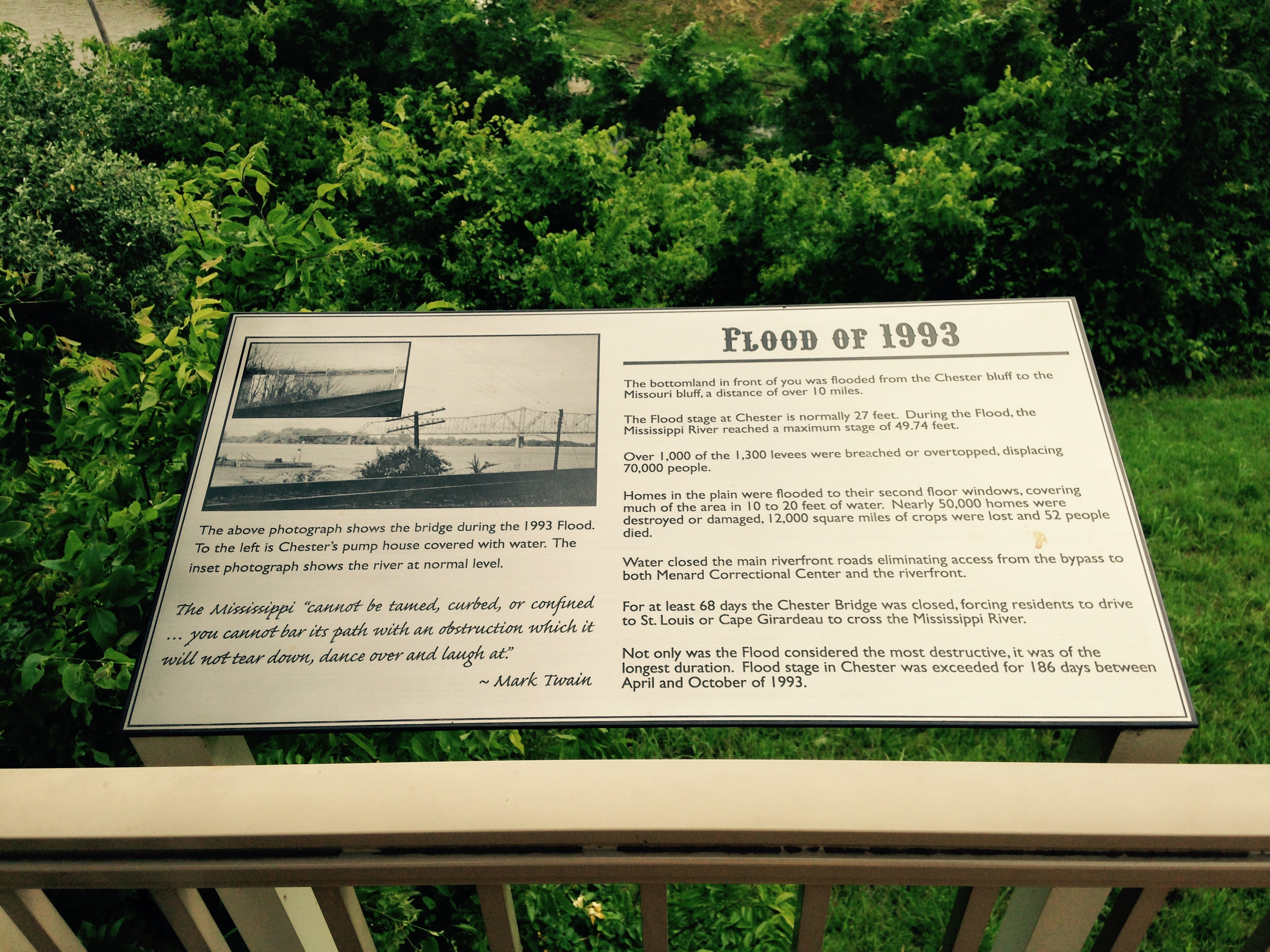
Flood of 1993 plaque

== See also ==
- List of crossings of the Upper Mississippi River
