= Lincoln Heritage Trail =

Highway trail in the United States

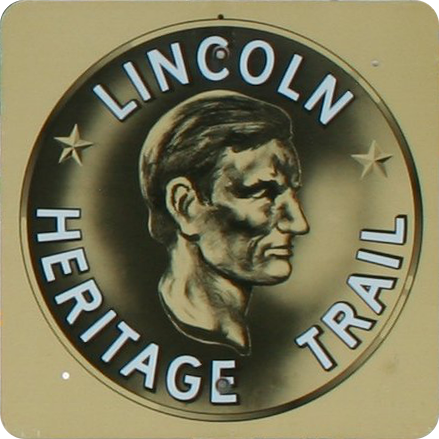
Lincoln Heritage Trail

Major junctions
- North end: Lincoln Trail Homestead State Memorial

Location
- Country: United States
- States: Illinois, Indiana, Kentucky

Highway system

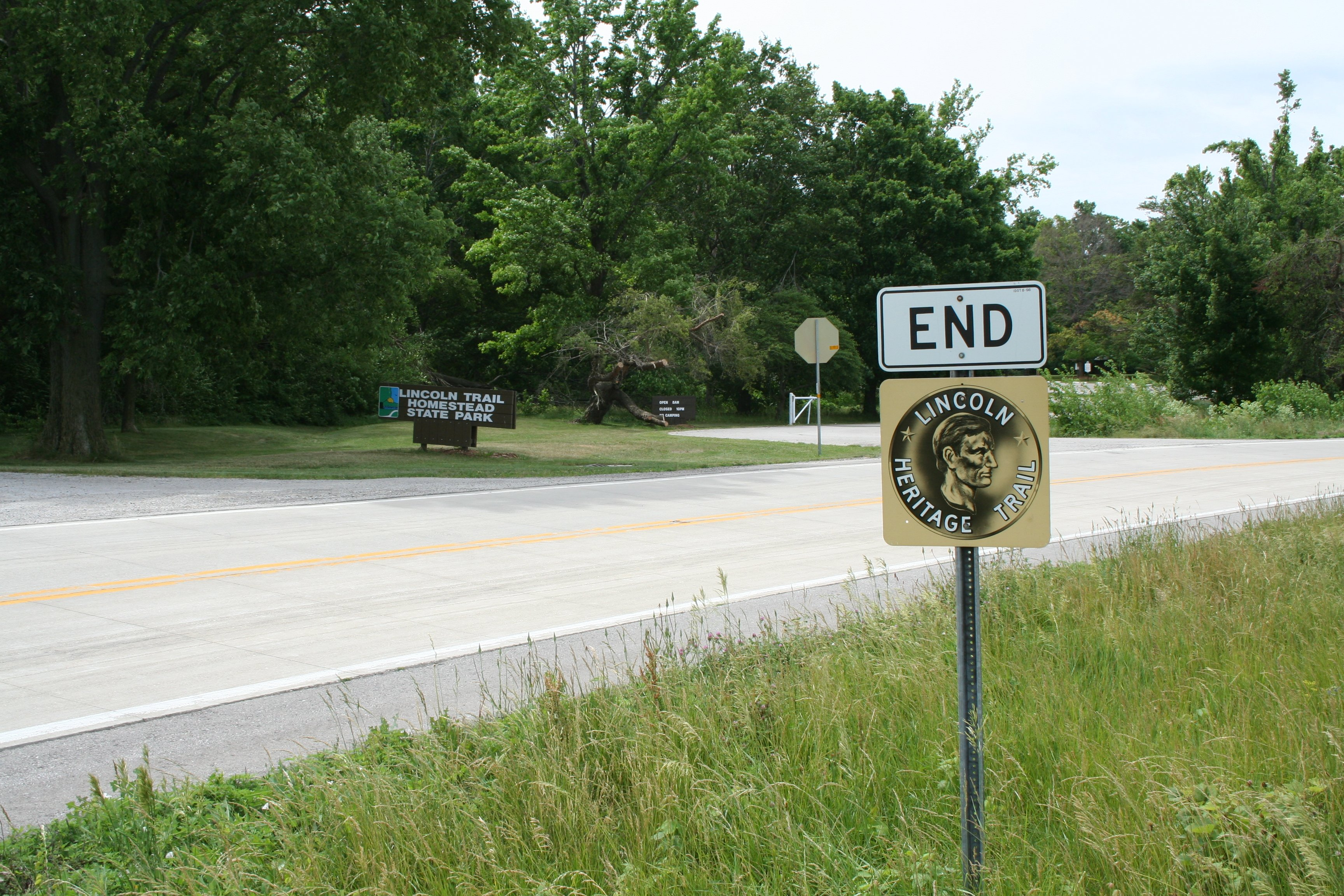
An end of the Lincoln Heritage Trail at the Lincoln Trail Homestead State Memorial in Macon County Illinois.

The Lincoln Heritage Trail is a designation for a series of highways in the U.S. states of Illinois, Indiana and Kentucky that links communities with pre-presidential period historical ties to U.S. president Abraham Lincoln.

== History ==
Fifty years after Lincoln's death (1915), the Illinois General Assembly authorized the Illinois State Historical Library to mark the exact route traveled by Lincoln from Kentucky through Indiana to Illinois. Almost another 50 years passed before the 1,000-mile (1,600 km) trail was opened in 1963.

The governors of all three states – Illinois' Otto Kerner, Indiana's Matthew Welsh and Kentucky's Bert Combs – took part in a conference at Kentucky Dam Village in mid-April 1963 to agree on the designation and plans to mark – and market – the route.

And marketing, not historical significance, was a – if not the – driving force behind the Lincoln Heritage Trail. As author Andrew Ferguson wrote, he quotes Robert Newman, Illinois' director of tourism in the 1960s. "[T]he whole thing was cooked up by the marketing guys at the American Petroleum Institute," Newman explained. "They wanted to get people traveling – get 'em into their cars, get 'em buying gasoline."

As part of the tourism effort, meetings were held in communities through which the Trail would pass, with attendees learning of the goal of drawing more tourists to Lincoln-related and other local attractions. Each community was to be responsible for its own advertising and service campaigns, but a centrally-produced brochure – of which the first 300,000-copy printing would later be extended by another million – would bring focus to the most important sites. The Tell City News reported that meetings held in Tell City and Dale, Indiana in the spring of 1963, garnered significant interest.

The Trail originally had 3,000 markers showing Lincoln's route to Illinois.

== Route description ==
=== Kentucky ===
In Kentucky, the main Trail followed US 60 from Henderson through Owensboro, Maceo, Lewisport, Hawesville, Cloverport and Hardinsburg, then over KY 86 and US 62 to Elizabethtown. From Elizabethtown, it continued via KY 61, US 31E, US 150 and US 68 through Hodgenville (and Lincoln's birthplace) and Harrodsburg to Lexington. From Lexington westward, the Trail then turned toward Louisville via US 421, US 460 and US 60 through Frankfort, Shelbyville and Simpsonville.

"Alternate" routes in Kentucky included:

- US 41 from Henderson to Hopkinsville
- US 68 from Hopkinsville through Fairview, Bowling Green, Glasgow, Edmonton, Campbellsville, Lebanon, Greensburg and Perryville
- US 31W from Bowling Green to Mammoth Cave
- A second segment of US 31W (Dixie Highway) between US 60 at Muldraugh and downtown Louisville
- KY 79, KY 448 and KY 1638 from Irvington through Brandenburg to US 31W/US 60 at Muldraugh
- KY 90 from Glasgow to Albany, then US 127 north to Harrodsburg

=== Indiana ===
An unrelated, but historically accurate "Lincoln Trail" was mapped for travelers in the Hoosier State in 1958 and 1959. This route, which followed the route of the family's journey from Kentucky to their new life in Indiana in 1816 and onward to Illinois 14 years later, began near Cannelton. The Cannelton News reported on May 6, 1958, that this Trail would "help publicize observance of the Lincoln Sesquicentennial," according to then-Gov. Harold Handley.

From its starting point at Cannelton, the trail proceeded:

- west through Tell City and Troy on SR 66 to SR 70 into Spencer County
- west on SR 70 to SR 245 east of Newtonville
- north on SR 245 to SR 162 at Santa Claus
- west on SR 162 through Lincoln City to US 231, SR 62 and SR 45 at Gentryville
- north on US 231, SR 62 and SR 45 to SR 68 at Dale
- west on SR 68 to SR 61 at Lynnville
- north on SR 61 through Spurgeon, Winslow, Petersburg and Monroe City to US 50 at Vincennes
- west on US 50 to Illinois via the Lincoln Memorial Bridge

While this initial "Lincoln Trail" would only be publicized through 1959, it would form the nucleus of Indiana's part of the 1963 Trail. Although some parts would be deleted – namely the Dale-to-Lynnville-to-SR 64 portion, in favor of the better, US 231 to SR 64 route between Dale and Huntingburg, the trail grew significantly with some major additions:

- SR 37 from Tell City to US 460/SR 62 at St. Croix
- US 460/SR 62 east via Sulphur, Corydon and New Albany to the K&I Bridge to Kentucky
- SR 245 from Santa Claus to US 460/SR 62 at Dale
- US 231/SR 45 from Dale to SR 64 at Huntingburg
- SR 64 west to SR 61 north
- US 41 from Kentucky into Evansville and US 460/SR 66
- US 460/SR 66 west from Evansville through Blairsville, Wadesville and New Harmony to Illinois via the Harmony Way Bridge

Several Alternate routes were added in Indiana as well:

- US 41 from Evansville to Haubstadt
- SR 66 from Rockport through Grandview to SR 70
- US 231/SR 45 from Rockport via Chrisney and Gentryville to US 460/SR 62/SR 68 at Dale
- SR 67 from Vincennes via Bicknell, Edwardsport, Westphalia, Sandborn, Marco, Lyons, Switz City, Worthington and Freedom to SR 46 at Spencer
- SR 46 from Spencer via Ellettsville and Bloomington to SR 135 at Nashville
- SR 135 from Nashville via Story and Freetown south to US 50
- US 50 west to SR 37 at Bedford
- SR 37 from Bedford south to SR 60 at Mitchell
- SR 60 east from Mitchell to US 31E at Jeffersonville

In more recent years, a portion of the Trail was rerouted again to follow US 231 north to Jasper, and then west on SR 56 to SR 61 north of Winslow. From here it follows SR 61 to Vincennes.

=== Illinois ===
In Illinois, there were two branches of the Trail designated as the Southern Branch and Eastern Branch. The Southern Branch began on the Illinois side of the Wabash River opposite New Harmony, Indiana. The Eastern Branch began at Westport, on the western end of the Lincoln Memorial Bridge across from Vincennes, Indiana.

The Southern Branch followed:

- US 460 west through the cities of Carmi and McLeansboro to Route 37 at Mt. Vernon
- Route 37 north to US 50 at Salem
- US 50 west and US 51 north to Route 185 at Vandalia
- Route 185 to US 66, Routes 48 and 127 at Hillsboro
- US 66 to Springfield
- Portions of Routes 155, 125 and 97 between Springfield, Petersburg and Lincoln

The Eastern Branch followed:

- Route 33 and Route 1 north from west of Vincennes to near Marshall
- Local roadways from Marshall to Route 121 at Charleston
- Routes 121 and 32 through Mattoon and Decatur to Lincoln

Alternate routes with no notable Lincoln ties (at least as far as the 1963 brochure indicated) included:

- One connecting Carmi via US 45 to Eldorado and Harrisburg, south to Route 1 and Cairo, and then northwest along Route 3 from Cairo to Chester
- Another from McLeansboro to Carbondale, then west on Route 13 to Route 3
- A route following US 24 from Petersburg to Quincy
- And finally a route via Route 96, US 34, US 150 and Route 121 from Quincy through Monmouth, Galesburg and Peoria back to Lincoln

== Decline ==
As the Interstate Highway System began to be completed in Indiana, Illinois and Kentucky throughout the 1970s, traffic numbers on these older state and U.S. highways declined and, eventually, as signs wore out, many were not replaced. This has been especially true in Kentucky.

Indiana has maintained signage on the main line of the Trail and rerouted it in some areas, as mentioned above. Alternate routes are generally no longer marked, but a notable exception is the segment of US 231 and SR 67 between Worthington and Spencer, where several reassurance markers can be seen.

Until recent years, Illinois, for its part, has done a much better job of continuing to maintain signage in many areas, and the route is fairly easy to follow. However, the Trail is no longer marked on IDOT highway maps produced for the public; the last to show it was the 2017–2018 issue.
