= Illinois Route 154 =

State highway in southern Illinois, US

Illinois Route 154
- IL 154 highlighted in red

Route information
- Maintained by IDOT
- Length: 63.63 mi (102.40 km)
- Existed: 1926–present

Major junctions
- West end: IL 3 / IL 159 in Red Bud
- US 51 in Sunfield; I-57 in Whittington
- East end: IL 37 in Whittington

Location
- Country: United States
- State: Illinois
- Counties: Randolph, Perry, Franklin

Highway system
- Illinois State Highway System; Interstate; US; State; Tollways; Scenic
← IL 153	→ I-155

Illinois Route 154 is an east–west state road in southern Illinois. It runs from Illinois Route 3 in Red Bud to Illinois Route 37 in Whittington, over a distance of 63.63 miles (102.40 km).

== Route description ==
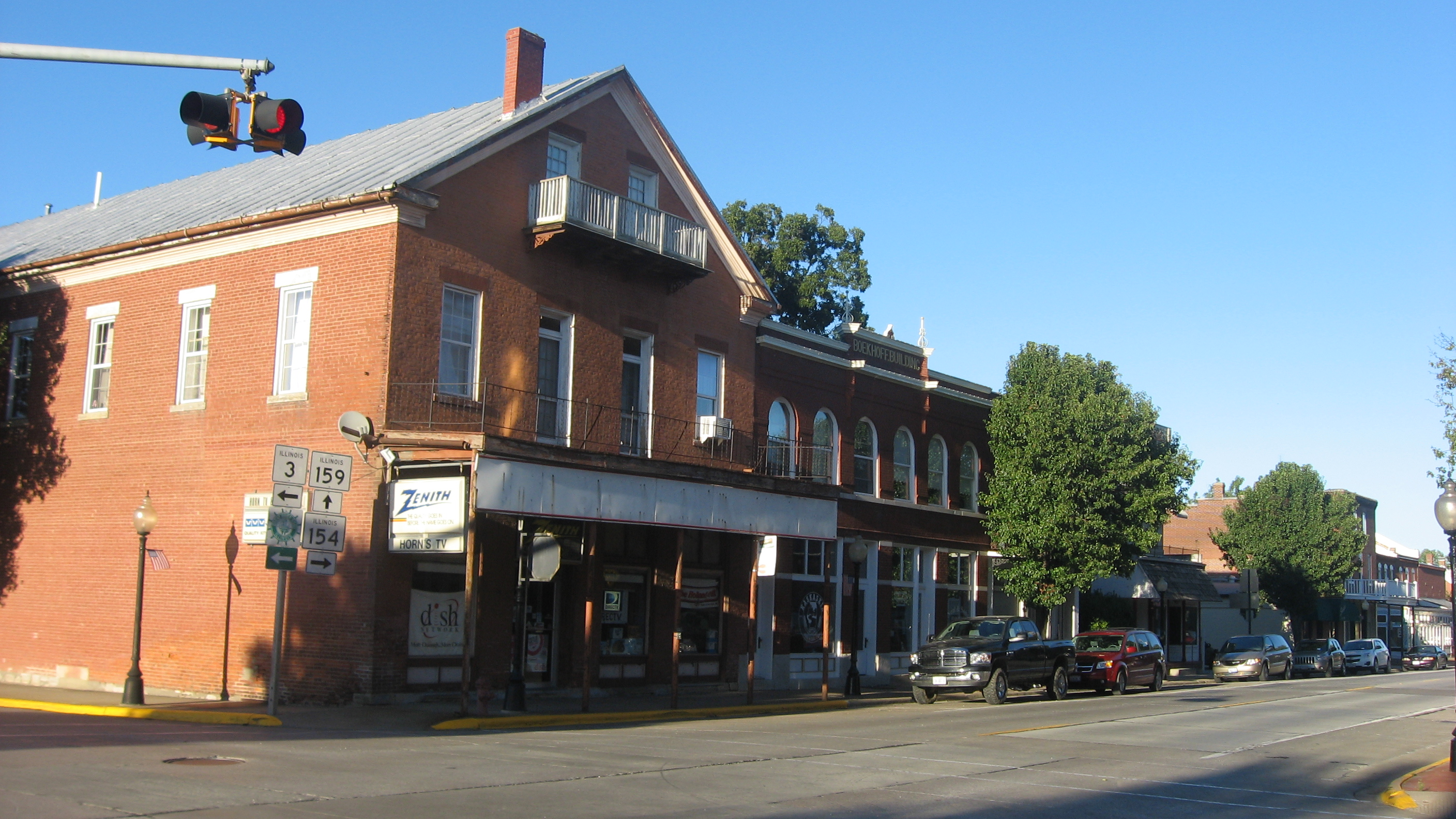
Western terminus of IL 154 at IL 3/IL 159 in Red Bud

Illinois 154 is the main east–west road through Pinckneyville. Just before intersecting Interstate 57 on the eastern end, it bridges Rend Lake. Illinois 154 has overlaps Illinois Route 13 and Illinois Route 148.

== History ==
SBI Route 154 originally ran from Pinckneyville to U.S. Route 51 north of Sunfield. In 1937 it was extended west to Red Bud, replacing Illinois Route 170 and Illinois Route 13 in the process. In 1984, Illinois 154 was extended east on a new road over Rend Lake, replacing IL 183. The original 1926 routing of Illinois 183 is most likely underwater.

== Major Intersections ==
County	Location	mi	km	Destinations	Notes
Randolph	Red Bud	0.0	0.0	IL 3 (Market Street) / IL 159 north (Main Street) / Great River Road – East St. Louis, Chester, Belleville	Western terminus of IL 154; southern terminus of IL 159
Randolph	Sparta	17.8	28.6	IL 4 (Market Street) – Mascoutah, Steeleville	
Randolph		19.7	31.7	IL 153 north – Coulterville	Southern terminus of IL 153
Perry		26.9	43.3	IL 150 west – Cutler	Eastern terminus of IL 150
Perry	Pinckneyville	35.8	57.6	IL 13 west – Belleville	West end of IL 13 concurrency
Perry	Pinckneyville	36.7	59.1	IL 13 east / IL 127 (Main Street) – Murphysboro, Nashville	East end of IL 13 concurrency
Perry		44.4	71.5	US 51 – Centralia, Du Quoin	
Franklin	Sesser	54.6	87.9	IL 148 south (Park Street)	West end of IL 148 concurrency
Franklin	Sesser	55.3	89.0	IL 148 (Park Street)	East end of IL 148 concurrency
Franklin		63.0	101.4	I-57 – Mt. Vernon, Cairo	I-57 exit 77
Franklin		63.63	102.40	IL 37 – Whittington, Mt. Vernon, Benton	Eastern terminus of IL 154
1.000 mi = 1.609 km; 1.000 km = 0.621 mi: Concurrency terminus
