= Vincent Birchler =

American educator and politician

Vincent A. Birchler (May 29, 1912 – November 3, 2000) was an American educator and politician.

Birchler was born in Coulterville, Illinois and went to the Coulterville High School. He received his bachelor's and master's degree in school administration and supervision from Southern Illinois University. He worked in school administration and as a teacher. Birchler was also involved with tax and business consultation. He served in the Illinois House of Representatives from 1975 to 1981 and was a Democrat. Birchler died at Chester Memorial Hospital in Chester, Illinois.
