= Pyramid State Recreation Area =

State park in Illinois, United States

- Location within Illinois Location within the United States
- Location: Perry County, Illinois, US
- Nearest city: Pinckneyville, Illinois
- Coordinates: 38°01′05″N 89°24′52″W
- Area: 19,701 acres (7,973 ha)
- Established: 1968
- Governing body: Illinois Department of Natural Resources

Pyramid State Recreation Area, the largest state recreation area in Illinois, contains 19,701 acres (7,973 ha). It is located within Perry County, and is administered by the Illinois Department of Natural Resources (Illinois DNR). The nearest large town is Pinckneyville, Illinois.

== History and current use ==
Pyramid State Recreation Area is almost entirely made up of land that was strip mined for coal. Like much of Southern Illinois, the region lay atop Pennsylvanian deposits of coal. Much of the coal was owned by St. Louis interests, and was shipped to that city for heating and industrial production during the first part of the 1900s. Until the 1960s, it was the custom to write off strip-mined sections of Illinois as worthless.

In 1959, the Pyramid Coal Company ceased mining operations, and 924 acres (374 ha) of former coal-mining property soon entered state hands, being owned and used by Southern Illinois University for research into the rehabilitation of strip-mined coal properties. In 1968, a predecessor of Illinois DNR acquired this parcel of land, and continued the rehabilitation process of the parcel as a new natural area, at first named Pyramid State Park. After further land acquisition the new state park contained approximately 3,200 acres (1,300 ha) of open space. In 2001, Illinois DNR acquired 16,245 acres (6,574 ha) of additional reclaimed land from a separate coal company, forming the largest portion of the new Pyramid State Recreation Area.

The deposits of coal mine tailings on Pyramid State Recreation Area give the park an undulating appearance, very different from the natural geomorphology of most of Illinois. There are 24 separate lakes and bodies of water. A 10-horsepower boating limit is enforced throughout the park. 16.5 miles (27 km) of trails offer challenges to hikers, horseback riders, and mountain bikers. There are three primitive campgrounds.

The Illinois DNR manages sections of the park for the hunting of deer, upland birds such as doves, pheasants, and wild turkey, and waterfowl. Park hunting rules grant certain enumerated preferences to deer bowhunters. There is extensive fishing for largemouth bass, bluegill, and catfish, and limited fishing for smallmouth bass, muskie, northern pike, and walleye. Much of the former strip-mined land has been replanted with trees, with tolerant, early succession trees such as cottonwood, box elder, and sycamore predominating. Illinois DNR planners hope to increase the numbers of oak and hickory trees in the recreation area.

=== Birds ===
The Pyramid State Recreation Area has been listed by the Audubon Society as an Important Bird Area of Illinois, because of the extensive grasslands located within the state park and the parcel's vulnerability to infestation from exotic species. They also note the state park's service as a territory for wetland birds such as the sandhill crane, trumpeter swan, and owls such as the barn owl and the short-eared owl.
