= Jacob, Illinois =

- Unincorporated community
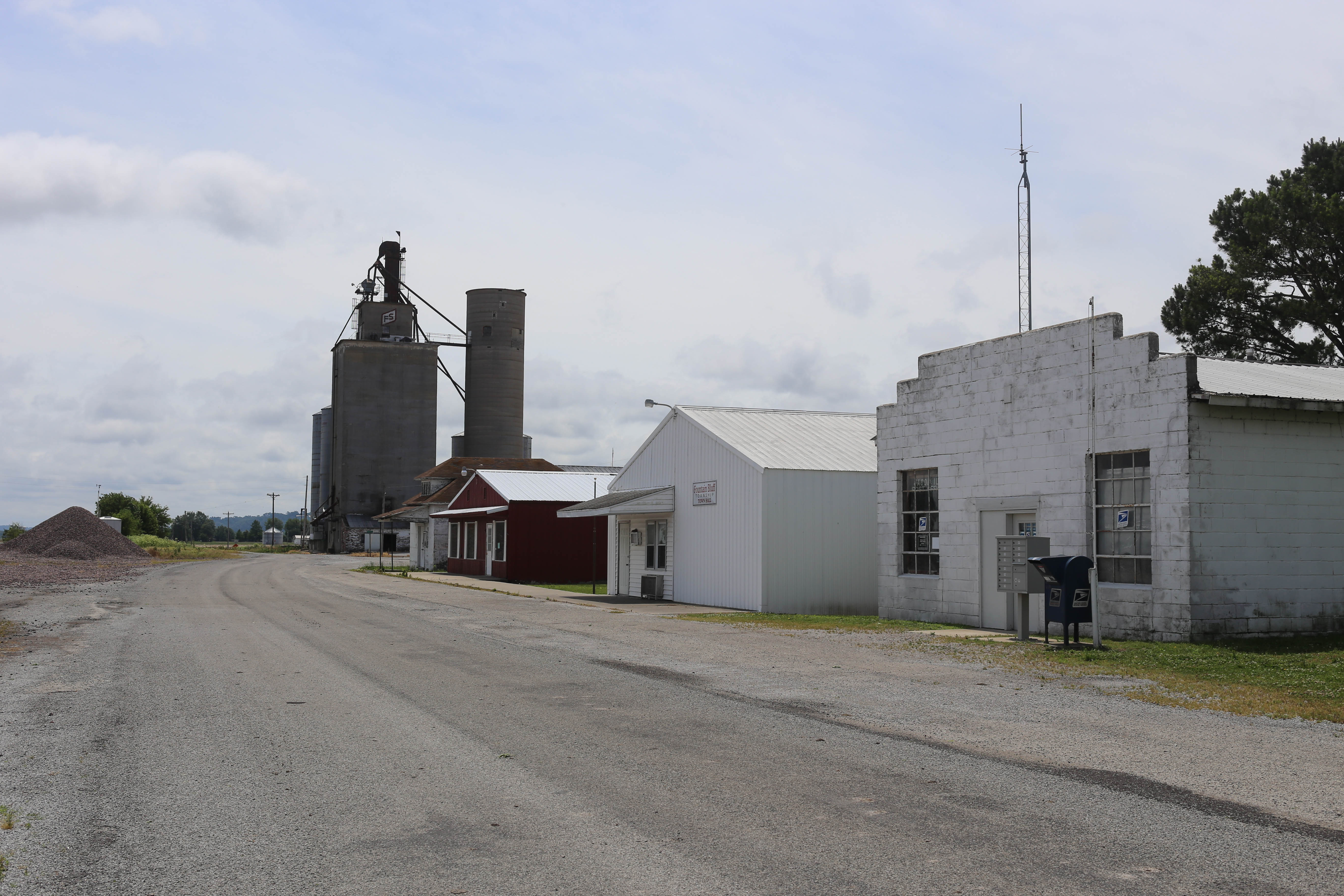
- Nickname: God's Country
- Location within Illinois Location within the United States
- Coordinates: 37°44′42″N 89°32′13″W
- Country: United States
- State: Illinois
- County: Jackson
- Elevation: 354 ft (108 m)
- Time zone: UTC-6 (Central (CST))
  - Summer (DST): UTC-5 (CDT)
- ZIP code: 62950
- Area code: 618
- GNIS feature ID: 411015

Jacob is an unincorporated community in Jackson County, Illinois, United States. Jacob is located along a railroad line 3 miles (4.8 km) northwest of Gorham. Jacob has a post office with ZIP code 62950.
