= Lincoln Memorial Bridge =

- Coordinates: 38°40′54″N 087°32′07″W
- Carries: SR 441
- Crosses: Wabash River
- Locale: Vincennes, Indiana / Lawrence County, Illinois

Characteristics
- Design: Open-spandrel Deck Arch
- Total length: 1,065.6 feet
- Width: 22.0 feet
- Longest span: 189.9 feet

History
- Opened: September 3, 1933

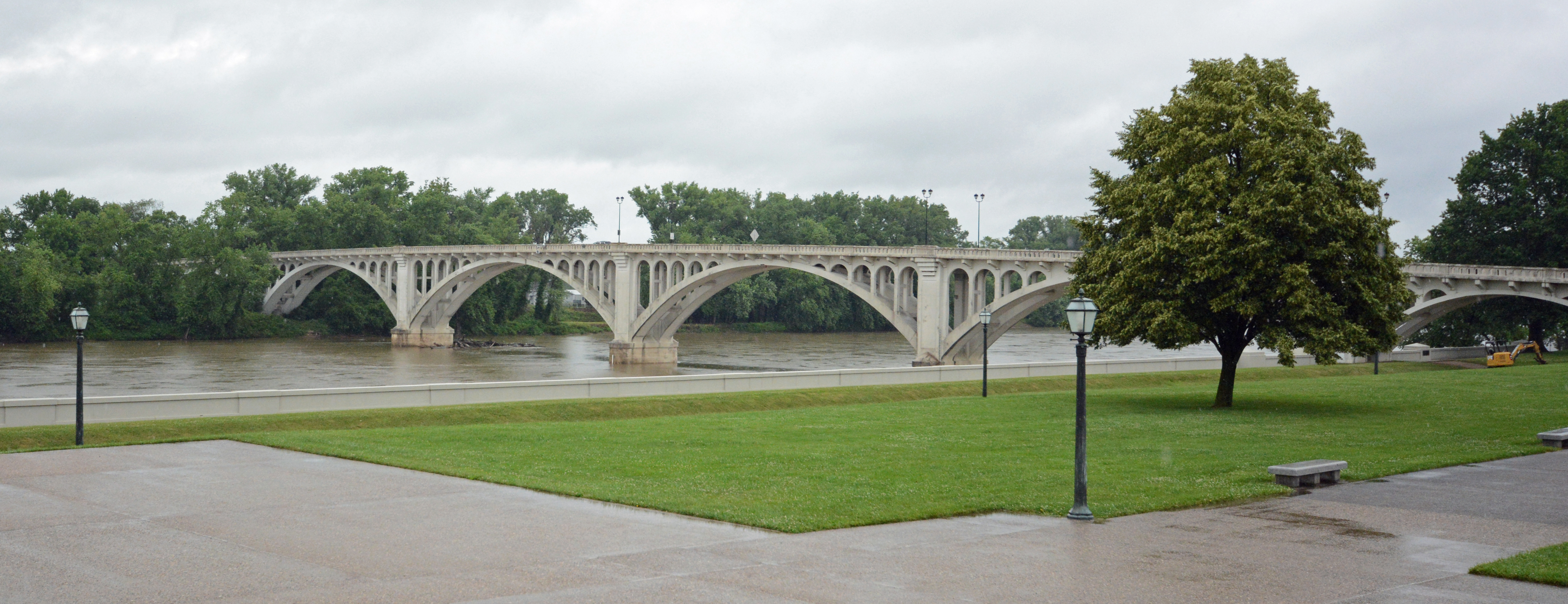
The Lincoln Memorial Bridge

Lincoln Memorial Bridge is a reinforced concrete, open-spandrel deck arch bridge built carrying U.S. Route 50 Business over the Wabash River between Vincennes, Indiana and Lawrence County, Illinois. It is said to mark the point where Abraham Lincoln crossed the Wabash River on his way to Illinois in 1830, and a sculptural installation, the Lincoln Trail State Memorial, marks the western end of the bridge.

== Lincoln Memorial Bridge Pylons ==
The Lincoln Memorial Bridge Pylons are a public artwork by French artist Raoul Josset, located on the Lincoln Memorial Bridge on U.S. Route 50 on the grounds of the George Rogers Clark National Historical Park. The pylons feature two full-length reliefs of Native American chiefs, Tecumseh and his younger brother The Prophet. The two pylons are made of granite and the figures are on the front faces of the pylons at the entrance to the bridge. The southern figure is dressed in ceremonial regalia with a club in his right hand. The northern figure is also dressed in similar regalia and holds a blanket. The south side of the proper right relief is signed by the artist: RAOUL/JOSSET/SC. They stand at 9.38 × 2.03 × 1.08 ft (286 cm × 62 × 33) and were installed in 1936.

== See also ==
- The Arlington Memorial Bridge in Washington, D.C. is often mistakenly referred to as the Lincoln Memorial Bridge.
- A bridge over the Illinois River called the Abraham Lincoln Memorial Bridge.
- In downtown Milwaukee, Wisconsin, a bridge crossing over Lincoln Memorial Drive next to the Milwaukee Art Museum and War Memorial Center is known as the Lincoln Memorial Bridge.

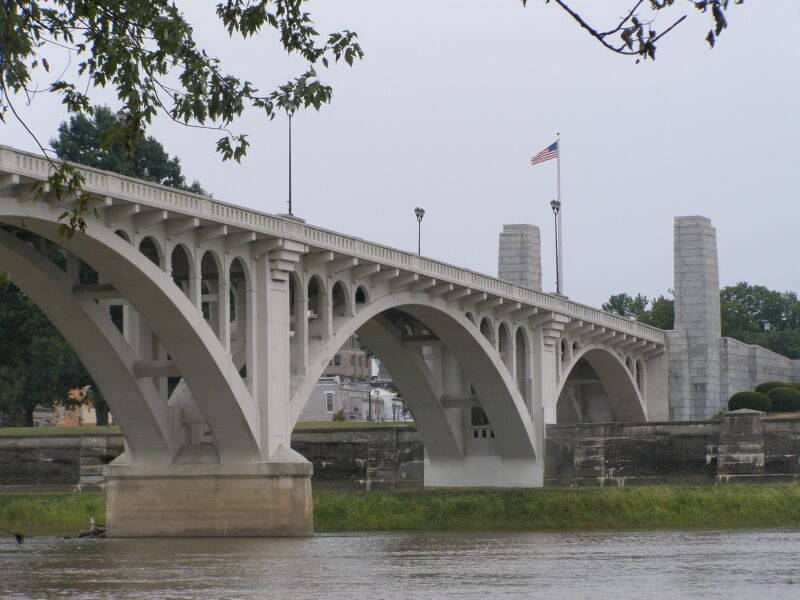
Eastern arches (Indiana Side)
