= Coulterville, Illinois =

Coulterville
- Village
- The Village of Coulterville
- Location of Coulterville in Randolph County, Illinois.
- Coordinates: 38°11′06″N 89°36′16″W
- Country: United States
- State: Illinois
- County: Randolph
- Founded: November 19, 1850
- Grant Cote: August 18, 1874
- Founder: James B. Coulter

Area
  - Total: 0.57 sq mi (1.47 km^{2})
  - Land: 0.57 sq mi (1.47 km^{2})
  - Water: 0 sq mi (0.00 km^{2})
- Elevation: 554 ft (169 m)

Population (2020)
  - Total: 834
  - Density: 1,466.9/sq mi (566.36/km^{2})
- Time zone: UTC-6 (CST)
  - Summer (DST): UTC-5 (CDT)
- ZIP code: 62237
- Area code: 618
- FIPS code: 17-16613
- GNIS feature ID: 2398635
- Website: https://www.coulterville.org

Coulterville is a village in Randolph County, Illinois, United States. As of the 2020 census, Coulterville had a population of 834.

== History ==
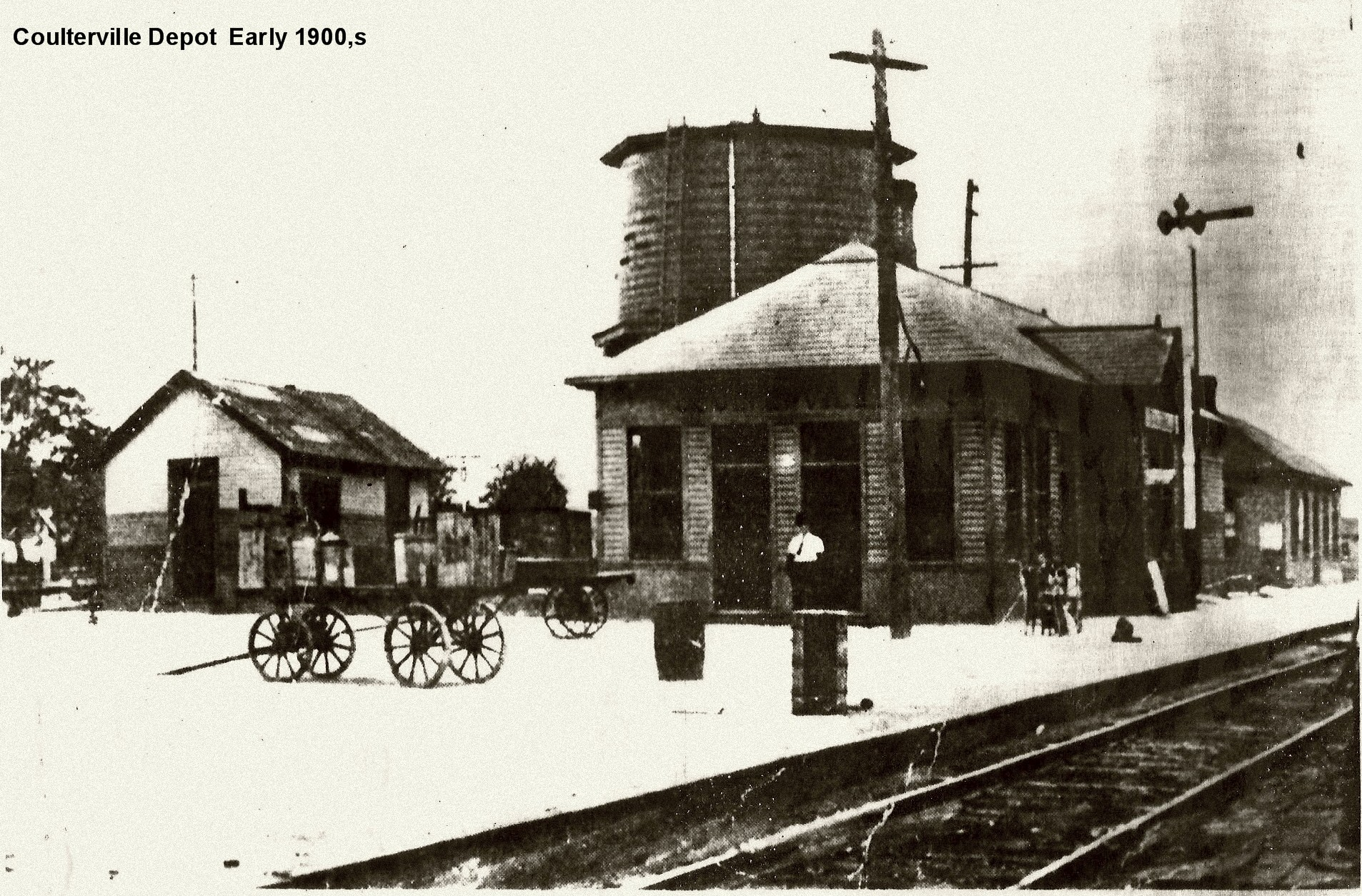
Early Coulterville Train Depot

Coulterville was named for its founder, James B. Coulter.

== Geography ==
According to the 2010 census, Coulterville has a total area of 0.56 square miles (1.45 km^{2}), all land.

== Demographics ==
Historical population
Census	Pop.	Note	%±
1880	590		—
1890	598		1.4%
1900	650		8.7%
1910	949		46.0%
1920	1,407		48.3%
1930	1,337		−5.0%
1940	1,284		−4.0%
1950	1,160		−9.7%
1960	1,022		−11.9%
1970	1,186		16.0%
1980	1,118		−5.7%
1990	984		−12.0%
2000	1,230		25.0%
2010	945		−23.2%
2020	834		−11.7%
U.S. Decennial Census

At the 2000 census there were 1,230 people, 514 households, and 360 families in the village. The population density was 2,174.4 inhabitants per square mile (839.5/km^{2}). There were 610 housing units at an average density of 1,078.4 units per square mile (416.4 units/km^{2}). The racial makeup of the village was 96.34% White, 1.87% African American, 0.08% Native American, 0.33% Asian, 0.08% Pacific Islander, and 1.30% from two or more races. Hispanic or Latino of any race were 0.16%.

Of the 514 households 35.6% had children under the age of 18 living with them, 50.6% were married couples living together, 13.4% had a female householder with no husband present, and 29.8% were non-families. 26.5% of households were one person and 12.3% were one person aged 65 or older. The average household size was 2.39 and the average family size was 2.87.

The age distribution was 27.8% under the age of 18, 8.0% from 18 to 24, 28.5% from 25 to 44, 22.0% from 45 to 64, and 13.7% 65 or older. The median age was 36 years. For every 100 females, there were 93.1 males. For every 100 females age 18 and over, there were 95.6 males.

The median household income was $26,776 and the median family income was $30,938. Males had a median income of $31,550 versus $19,113 for females. The per capita income for the village was $17,994. About 12.6% of families and 18.6% of the population were below the poverty line, including 31.4% of those under age 18 and 16.3% of those age 65 or over.

== Notable people ==
- Vincent Birchler, Illinois educator and politician, was born in Coulterville
- Nick Kahl, second baseman for the Cleveland Naps
