= Sparta, Illinois =

Sparta
- City
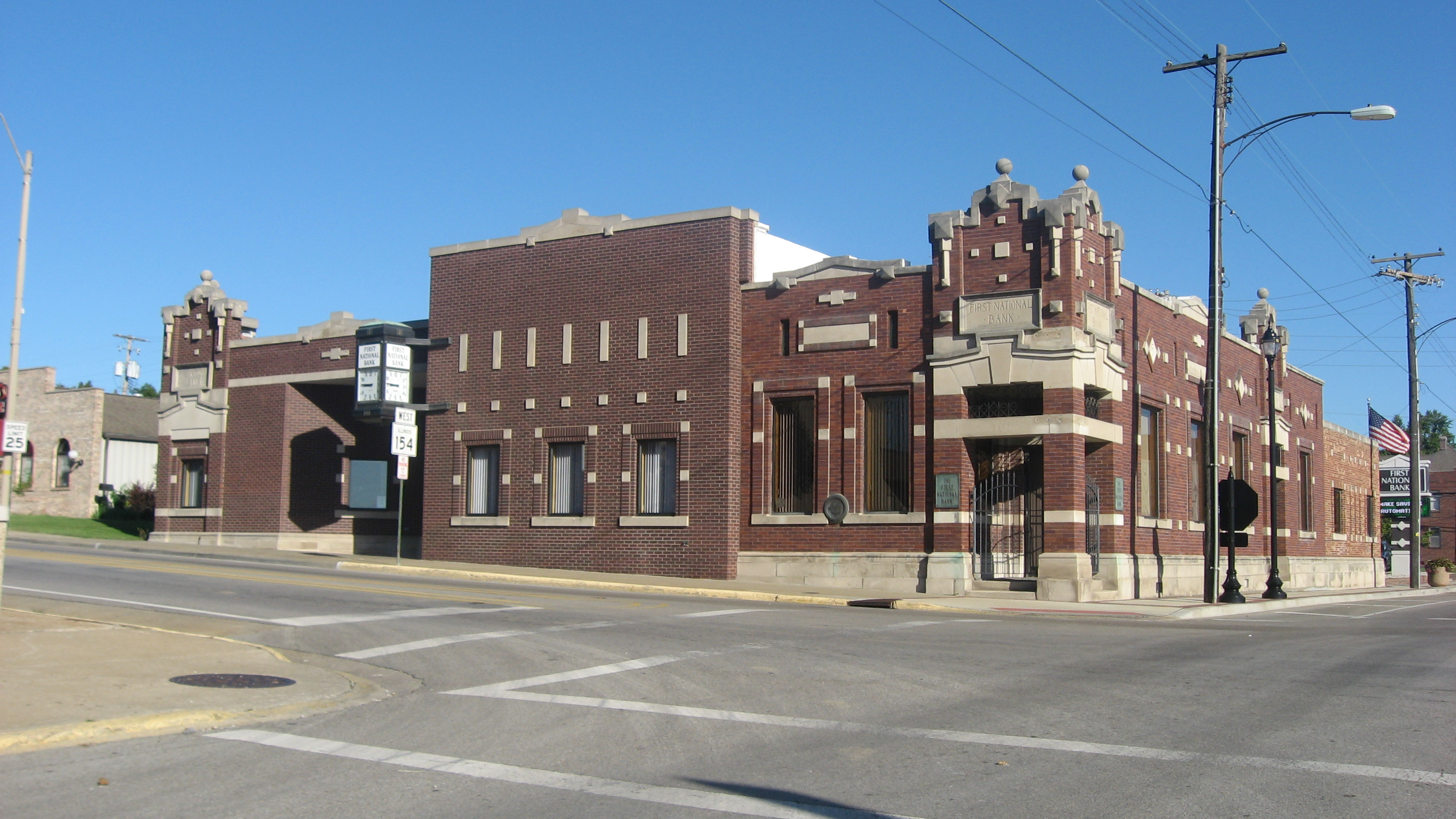
- Intersection of Market Street and Broadway downtown

- Location of Sparta in Randolph County, Illinois.
- Coordinates: 38°08′57″N 89°43′50″W
- Country: United States
- State: Illinois
- County: Randolph
- Established: 1829

Government
  - Type: Mayor–council

Area
  - Total: 11.43 sq mi (29.60 km^{2})
  - Land: 11.17 sq mi (28.93 km^{2})
  - Water: 0.26 sq mi (0.67 km^{2})
- Elevation: 469 ft (143 m)

Population (2020)
  - Total: 4,095
  - Density: 366.6/sq mi (141.55/km^{2})
- Time zone: UTC-6 (CST)
  - Summer (DST): UTC-5 (CDT)
- ZIP code: 62286
- Area code: 618
- FIPS code: 17-71448
- GNIS feature ID: 2395921
- Website: spartaillinois.us

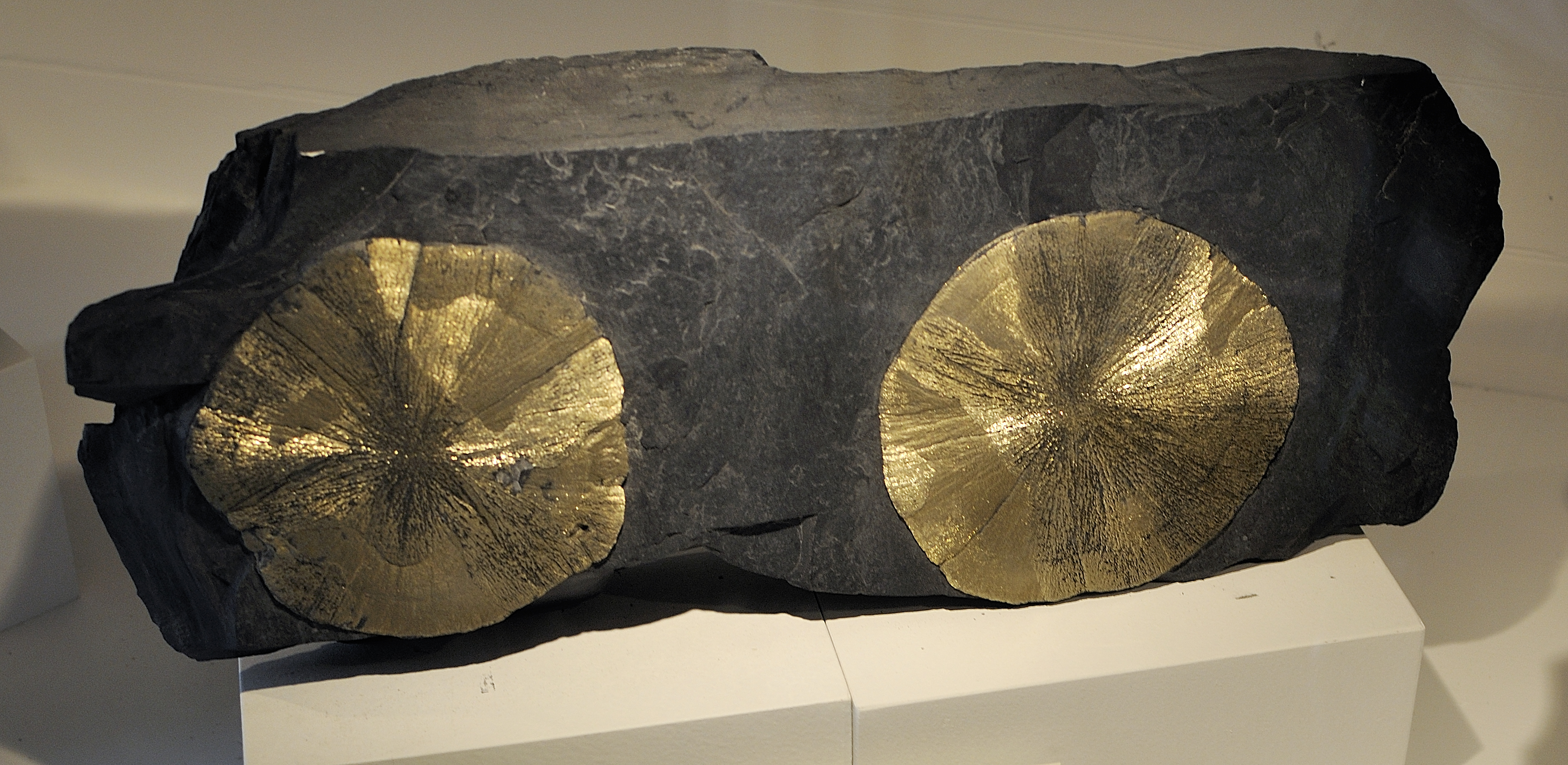
Pyrite discs in coal, from an old Sparta mine. Harvard Museum of Natural History

Sparta is a city in Randolph County, Illinois, United States. The population was 4,095 at the 2020 census. It has a total area of 11.443 square miles (29.64 km^{2}), of which 11.17 square miles (28.93 km^{2}) (or 97.61%) is land and 0.273 square miles (0.71 km^{2}) (or 2.39%) is water.

The city was the principal filming location for the 1967 film In the Heat of the Night.

== Printing ==
After World War II, Sparta became known as "Magazineland, U.S.A." due to the presence of numerous printing plants that produced most of the mass-market color comic books in the United States. Spartan Printing employed as many as 1,000 people at its peak. Later, major comics distributors situated their warehouses in and around Sparta.

== Sports venue ==
In 2005, the expansion of the Dayton International Airport forced the Amateur Trapshooting Association (ATA) to relocate from its previous headquarters in Vandalia, Ohio. The association chose to move to the vicinity of Sparta, following extensive lobbying by the city and the state.

In 2006, then-Illinois Governor Rod Blagojevich and local dignitaries opened the World Shooting and Recreational Complex north of Sparta. The ATA hosted its first Grand American at the facility in August of that year, with several thousand shooters attending. In 2012 the ATA moved their national headquarters to 1105 East Broadway, Sparta, Illinois.

== Demographics ==
Historical population
Census	Pop.	Note	%±
1870	1,335		—
1880	1,754		31.4%
1890	1,979		12.8%
1900	2,941		48.6%
1910	3,081		4.8%
1920	3,340		8.4%
1930	3,385		1.3%
1940	3,664		8.2%
1950	3,576		−2.4%
1960	3,452		−3.5%
1970	4,307		24.8%
1980	4,957		15.1%
1990	4,853		−2.1%
2000	4,486		−7.6%
2010	4,302		−4.1%
2020	4,095		−4.8%
U.S. Decennial Census 2020

=== 2020 census ===
As of the 2020 census, Sparta had a population of 4,095. The median age was 41.9 years. 22.8% of residents were under the age of 18 and 22.1% of residents were 65 years of age or older. For every 100 females there were 88.8 males, and for every 100 females age 18 and over there were 83.7 males age 18 and over.

There were 1,757 households in Sparta, of which 29.1% had children under the age of 18 living in them. Of all households, 40.0% were married-couple households, 17.5% were households with a male householder and no spouse or partner present, and 35.3% were households with a female householder and no spouse or partner present. About 33.8% of all households were made up of individuals and 16.7% had someone living alone who was 65 years of age or older.

There were 2,045 housing units, of which 14.1% were vacant. The homeowner vacancy rate was 3.6% and the rental vacancy rate was 14.0%.

Racial composition as of the 2020 census
Race	Number	Percent
White	3,024	73.8%
Black or African American	706	17.2%
American Indian and Alaska Native	8	0.2%
Asian	15	0.4%
Native Hawaiian and Other Pacific Islander	1	0.0%
Some other race	53	1.3%
Two or more races	288	7.0%
Hispanic or Latino (of any race)	105	2.6%

=== 2000 census ===
As of the 2000 census, there were 4,486 people, 1,783 households, and 1,164 families residing in the city. The population density was 496.6 inhabitants per square mile (191.7/km^{2}). There were 2,014 housing units at an average density of 223.0 units per square mile (86.1 units/km^{2}). The racial makeup of the city was 81.39% White, 15.65% African American, 0.36% Native American, 0.51% Asian, 0.27% from other races, and 1.83% from two or more races. Hispanic or Latino of any race were 1.36% of the population.

There were 1,783 households, out of which 30.8% had children under the age of 18 living with them, 47.9% were married couples living together, 13.8% had a female householder with no husband present, and 34.7% were non-families. 30.0% of all households were made up of individuals, and 14.4% had someone living alone who was 65 years of age or older. The average household size was 2.42 and the average family size was 3.01.

In the city, the population was spread out, with 25.6% under the age of 18, 8.0% from 18 to 24, 24.8% from 25 to 44, 23.0% from 45 to 64, and 18.6% who were 65 years of age or older. The median age was 39 years. For every 100 females, there were 83.4 males. For every 100 females age 18 and over, there were 79.4 males.

The median income for a household in the city was $34,139, and the median income for a family was $41,908. Males had a median income of $30,386 versus $19,819 for females. The per capita income for the city was $16,343. About 10.9% of families and 16.0% of the population were below the poverty line, including 27.3% of those under age 18 and 4.2% of those age 65 or over.

== Notable people ==
- Earle Gardner, infielder for the New York Highlanders
- Darius Jackson, running back for the Dallas Cowboys
- Nathan Thomas Velar (1858–1928) African American elected official, postmaster
- John Wittenborn, kicker for San Francisco 49ers, Philadelphia Eagles, and Houston Oilers
