= Pinckneyville, Illinois =

- City
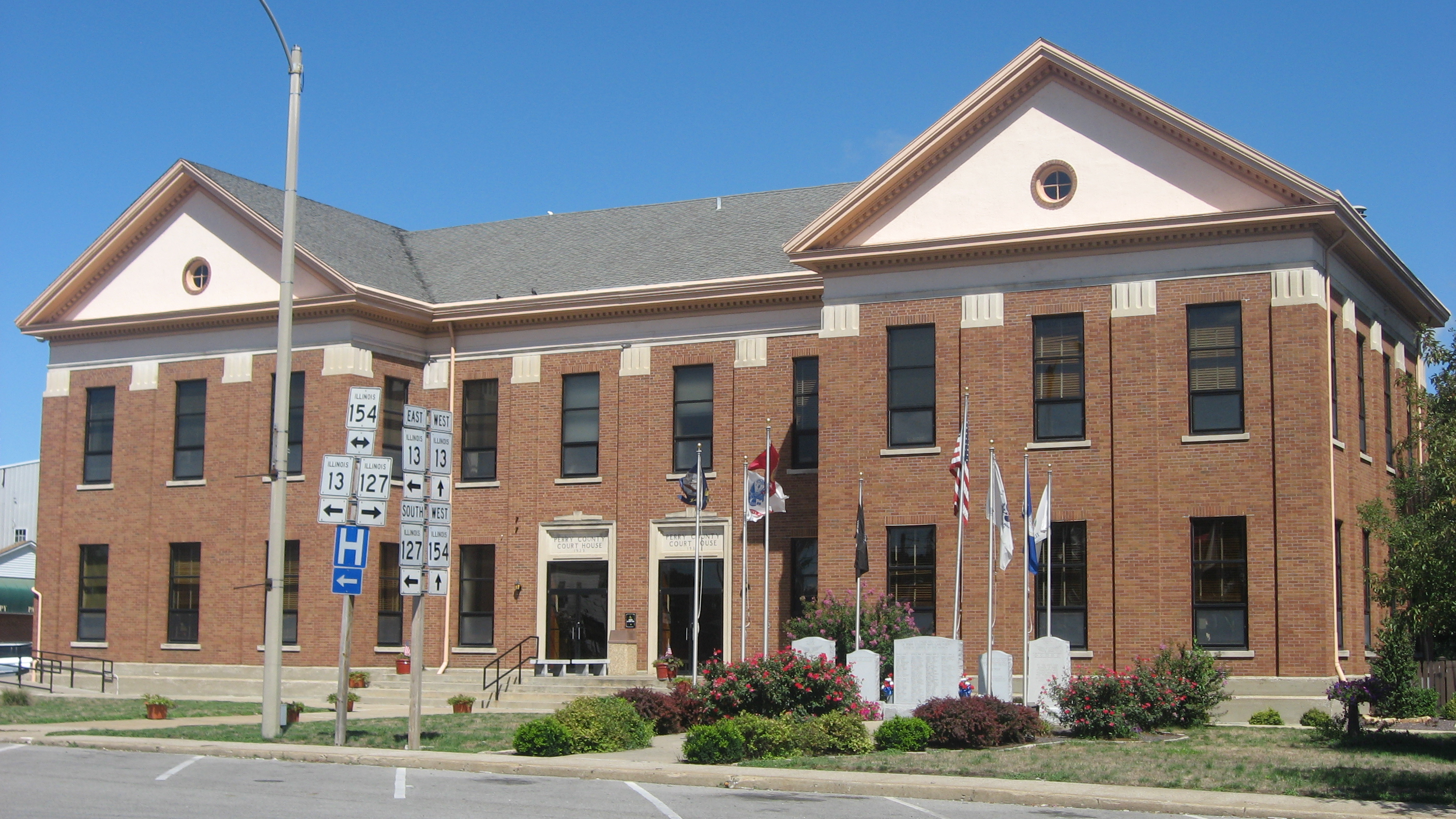
- The Perry County Courthouse in downtown Pinckneyville
- Motto: The friendly little city
- Interactive map of Pinckneyville, Illinois
- Location within Illinois Location within the United States
- Coordinates: 38°04′51″N 89°21′50″W
- Country: United States
- State: Illinois
- County: Perry

Area
  - Total: 4.38 sq mi (11.35 km^{2})
  - Land: 4.11 sq mi (10.64 km^{2})
  - Water: 0.27 sq mi (0.71 km^{2})
- Elevation: 427 ft (130 m)

Population (2020)
  - Total: 5,066
  - Density: 1,233.7/sq mi (476.34/km^{2})
- Time zone: UTC−6 (CST)
  - Summer (DST): UTC−5 (CDT)
- ZIP code: 62274
- Area code: 618
- FIPS code: 17-59884
- GNIS ID: 2396207
- Website: www.ci.pinckneyville.il.us

Pinckneyville is a city in and the county seat of Perry County, Illinois, United States. The population was 5,066 at the 2020 census. It is named for Charles Cotesworth Pinckney, an early American diplomat and presidential candidate.

Pinckneyville is the location of the Pinckneyville Power Plant, a combustion turbine generator (CTG)-type power plant run by Ameren.

== History ==
Perry County was formed on January 29, 1827. It was named for Commodore Oliver H. Perry. When Perry County was established, 80 acres were taken from nearby Jackson and Randolph counties; 20 acres were reserved for the county seat. On May 17, 1857, Pinckneyville (named after Charles Cotesworth Pinckney) was organized and named as the county seat. Before being organized, Pinckneyville consisted as of 1834 of a log courthouse, four stores, a tavern, and a grocery (the first store was opened in 1827); around 20 families lived in the town. 1834 was also the same year that the Perry County jail was constructed; a larger jail, which is now the home of the Perry County jail museum, was built in 1871.

During the American Civil War (1861–1865), southern Illinois was under martial law. In the years after Reconstruction, many laws were established to ensure the second-class status of African Americans. Many actions, however, were de facto laws. From 1890 to 1968, many sundown towns were established throughout the United States, including several in southern Illinois. Pinckneyville, on the other hand, was one amongst thousands of towns that, while established earlier, became a sundown town. Pinckneyville became sundown around 1928; the extant story in Pinckneyville is that a white woman was raped by a black man. The white leadership of the town loaded the black population of the town on a bus, drove them out of town, and left them in East St. Louis; a black man, probably the alleged rapist, was lynched at the town square. However, the rape explanation is considered to be unreliable because of the vagueness of the story and because it conflicts with accounts offered by others who lived in Pinckneyville at the time. The town continued to be a sundown town; the town had a "hanging tree", although African Americans were hanged in at least three separate places; under the city limits sign, there was a sign saying "No Coloreds After Dark" that came down in the late 1960s or early 1970s. In the town cemetery's black section, there are only two grave markers, yet it is estimated that there are approximately twenty graves.

As of the 2000 United States census, 1,331 of the 5,464 residents were black, however this population total includes the inmates of Pinckneyville Correctional Center, who are mostly African-American. Pinckneyville is home to the Illinois Rural Heritage museum. In 2010, it was awarded the Governor's Hometown Award.

== Geography ==
Pinckneyville is located on Illinois Route 13 about 60 miles (97 km) southeast of St. Louis.

According to the 2010 census, Pinckneyville has a total area of 4.315 square miles (11.18 km^{2}), of which 4.04 square miles (10.46 km^{2}) (or 93.63%) is land and 0.275 square miles (0.71 km^{2}) (or 6.37%) is water.

== Demographics ==
Historical population
Census	Pop.	Note	%±
1860	436		—
1870	773		77.3%
1880	964		24.7%
1890	1,298		34.6%
1900	2,357		81.6%
1910	2,722		15.5%
1920	2,649		−2.7%
1930	3,046		15.0%
1940	3,146		3.3%
1950	3,299		4.9%
1960	3,085		−6.5%
1970	3,377		9.5%
1980	3,319		−1.7%
1990	3,372		1.6%
2000	5,464		62.0%
2010	5,648		3.4%
2020	5,066		−10.3%
U.S. Decennial Census

=== Racial and ethnic composition ===
Pinckneyville city, Illinois – Racial and ethnic composition Note: the US Census treats Hispanic/Latino as an ethnic category. This table excludes Latinos from the racial categories and assigns them to a separate category. Hispanics/Latinos may be of any race.
Race / Ethnicity (NH = Non-Hispanic)	Pop 2000	Pop 2010	Pop 2020	% 2000	% 2010	% 2020
White alone (NH)	3,861	3,741	3,338	70.66%	66.24%	65.89%
Black or African American alone (NH)	1,331	1,423	1,240	24.36%	25.19%	24.48%
Native American or Alaska Native alone (NH)	9	7	5	0.16%	0.12%	0.10%
Asian alone (NH)	11	26	36	0.20%	0.46%	0.71%
Native Hawaiian or Pacific Islander alone (NH)	0	1	0	0.00%	0.02%	0.00%
Other race alone (NH)	2	4	5	0.04%	0.07%	0.10%
Mixed race or Multiracial (NH)	6	39	95	0.11%	0.69%	1.88%
Hispanic or Latino (any race)	244	407	347	4.47%	7.21%	6.85%
Total	5,464	5,648	5,066	100.00%	100.00%	100.00%

=== 2020 census ===
As of the 2020 census, Pinckneyville had a population of 5,066. The median age was 36.6 years. 12.8% of residents were under the age of 18 and 15.4% of residents were 65 years of age or older. For every 100 females there were 202.4 males, and for every 100 females age 18 and over there were 232.1 males age 18 and over.

0.0% of residents lived in urban areas, while 100.0% lived in rural areas.

There were 1,424 households in Pinckneyville, of which 25.7% had children under the age of 18 living in them. Of all households, 40.6% were married-couple households, 20.1% were households with a male householder and no spouse or partner present, and 32.0% were households with a female householder and no spouse or partner present. About 37.7% of all households were made up of individuals and 18.2% had someone living alone who was 65 years of age or older.

There were 1,600 housing units, of which 11.0% were vacant. The homeowner vacancy rate was 1.9% and the rental vacancy rate was 8.6%.

Racial composition as of the 2020 census
Race	Number	Percent
White	3,387	66.9%
Black or African American	1,262	24.9%
American Indian and Alaska Native	6	0.1%
Asian	36	0.7%
Native Hawaiian and Other Pacific Islander	0	0.0%
Some other race	260	5.1%
Two or more races	115	2.3%

=== 2000 census ===
As of the census of 2000, there were 5,464 people, 1,504 households, and 920 families residing in the city. The population density was 1,728.5 inhabitants per square mile (667.4/km^{2}). There were 1,662 housing units at an average density of 525.8 per square mile (203.0/km^{2}). The racial makeup of the city was 71.25% White, 24.36% African American, 0.16% Native American, 0.20% Asian, 0.05% Pacific Islander, 3.77% from other races, and 0.20% from two or more races. Hispanic or Latino of any race were 4.47% of the population.

There were 1,504 households, out of which 25.6% had children under the age of 18 living with them, 47.3% were married couples living together, 11.3% had a female householder with no husband present, and 38.8% were non-families. 35.9% of all households were made up of individuals, and 18.8% had someone living alone who was 65 years of age or older. The average household size was 2.23 and the average family size was 2.90.

In the city, the population was spread out, with 14.0% under the age of 18, 15.0% from 18 to 24, 39.7% from 25 to 44, 17.4% from 45 to 64, and 13.9% who were 65 years of age or older. The median age was 35 years. For every 100 females there were 188.3 males. For every 100 females age 18 and over, there were 209.9 males.

The median income for a household in the city was $30,391, and the median income for a family was $41,574. Males had a median income of $23,402 versus $21,848 for females. The per capita income for the city was $15,601. About 8.2% of families and 11.0% of the population were below the poverty line, including 14.2% of those under age 18 and 12.1% of those age 65 or over.

== Education ==
Elementary schools in Pinckneyville include District #50, CCSD 204, and St. Bruno Catholic School. Tamaroa grade school also feeds into the high school. Pinckneyville Community High School is the only high school serving the Pinckneyville area. The mascot is the panther. School colors are Columbia, Navy, and White. PCHS has longtime rivalries with DuQuoin High School and Nashville Community High School.

Pinckneyville is known for its boys basketball program, winning over 2,000 games and appearing in the State Finals Tournament 11 times (winning in 1948, 1994 and 2001).

== Notable people ==
- Roy Alden (1863–1937), newspaper editor and Illinois state senator
- Albert Brown (1905–2011), the oldest survivor of the Bataan Death March in 1942
- John Dunn, former president of Western Michigan University
- Ralph A. Dunn, businessman and Illinois state legislator
- Marion Rushing (1936–2013) NFL football player
