= Huegely, Illinois =

- Unincorporated community
- Location within Illinois Location within the United States
- Coordinates: 38°24′20″N 89°19′06″W
- Country: United States
- State: Illinois
- County: Washington
- Township: Hoyleton
- Elevation: 495 ft (151 m)
- Time zone: UTC-6 (Central (CST))
  - Summer (DST): UTC-5 (CDT)
- Area code: 618
- GNIS feature ID: 422827

Huegely is an unincorporated community in Hoyleton Township, Washington County, Illinois, United States. Huegely is 3.5 miles (5.6 km) southwest of Hoyleton.
