= Peabody Energy =

American coal mining company

Peabody Energy, Inc.
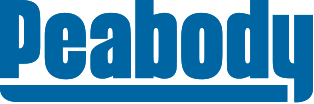
- Type: Public
- Traded as: NYSE: BTU; Russell 2000 Component; S&P 600 Component
- Industry: Coal mining
- Founded: 1883 (Chicago, Illinois, US)
- Headquarters: St. Louis, Missouri, US
- Key people: Jim Grech, President and CEO
- Revenue: $4.981 billion (2022) ▲$3.318 billion (2021)
- Operating income: ▲US$1.4 billion (2022)
- Total equity: US$3.3 billion (2023)
- Number of employees: 5,500 (2023)
- Website: peabodyenergy.com

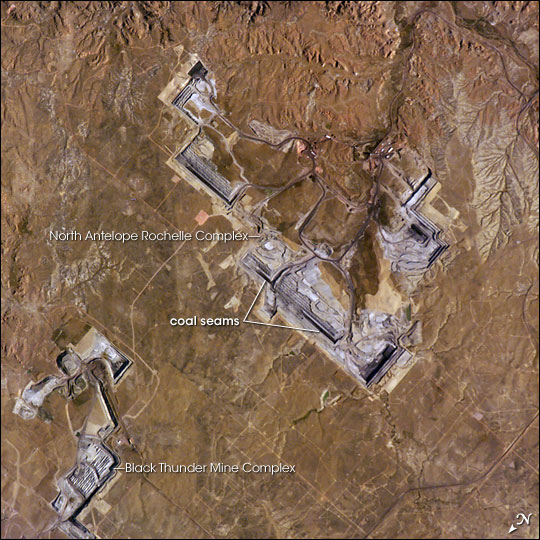
Peabody's North Antelope Rochelle Coal Mine, Wyoming in 2005, from ISS. A portion of Arch Coal's Black Thunder Mine Complex is visible to north (left).

Peabody Energy is an American coal mining company headquartered in St. Louis, Missouri. Its primary business consists of the mining, sale, and distribution of coal, which is purchased for use in electricity generation and steelmaking. Peabody also markets, brokers, and trades coal through offices in China, Australia, and the United States.

Peabody markets coal to electricity generating and industrial customers in more than 26 nations. It maintains ownership or majority interests in 17 surface and underground mining operations located throughout the United States and Australia. In the United States, company-owned mines are located in Alabama, Colorado, Illinois, Indiana, New Mexico, and Wyoming. Peabody's largest operation is the North Antelope Rochelle Mine located in Campbell County, Wyoming, which mined more than 60 million tons of coal in 2022. Peabody spun off coal mining operations in West Virginia and Kentucky into Patriot Coal Corporation in October 2007. In October 2011, Peabody acquired a majority ownership stake in Queensland-based Macarthur Coal Ltd, which specializes in the production of metallurgical coal, primarily seaborne pulverized injection coal.

The company filed for Chapter 11 bankruptcy protection on April 13, 2016. It emerged from bankruptcy on April 3, 2017, and started trading on NYSE with a ticker symbol BTU. It also changed the company logo from Peabody Energy to Peabody.

== History ==
=== Early years (1883–1959) ===
The Peabody Energy company was founded as Peabody, Daniels & Company in 1883 by Francis Peabody, the son of a prominent Chicago lawyer, and a partner. The company bought coal from established mines and sold it to homes and businesses in the Chicago area. In the late 1880s, Francis Peabody bought out his partner's share of the business and the company was incorporated in the state of Illinois under the name Peabody Coal Company in 1890. In 1895, it began operations of its first mine in Williamson County, Illinois and later expanded its operations in Illinois. In 1913, the company won its first long-term contract to supply Chicago Edison Company, the predecessor to utility Commonwealth Edison. The company's growth continued after World War I and the corporation went public for the first time in 1929 with a listing on the Midwest Stock Exchange, and in 1949 was listed on the New York Stock Exchange.

Despite being ranked eighth among the country's top coal producers in the mid-1950s, Peabody began to lose market share to companies operating cost-efficient surface mining operations. To address the situation, it entered into merger talks with Sinclair Coal Company. A merger between the two companies occurred in 1955, resulting in the transfer of Peabody's headquarters to St. Louis, Missouri. The merged company retained the Peabody name. Under the leadership of chairman Russell Kelce, the company expanded production and sales.

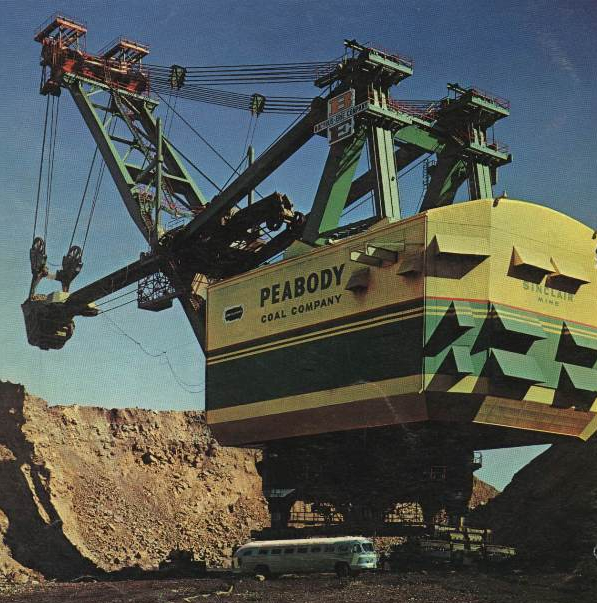
The Bucyrus Erie 3850-B power shovel named "Big Hog" went to work next door to Paradise Fossil Plant for Peabody Coal Company's Sinclair surface mine in 1962. When it started work it was received with grand fanfare and was the largest shovel in the world with a bucket size of 115 cubic yards (88 m^{3}). After it finished work in the mid-1980s, it was buried in a pit on the mine's property.

=== 1960–2000 ===
In 1962, Peabody expanded into the Pacific with the opening of mining operations in Queensland, Australia. During this period Peabody also forged an equity partnership with the Japanese trading company Mitsui & Co, and the Australian construction company Thiess. In 1968, the company was purchased by the Kennecott Copper Corporation. However, the Federal Trade Commission challenged the purchase as an antitrust violation. In 1976, the FTC ordered Kennecott to divest itself of Peabody. The newly created Peabody Holding Company purchased the Peabody Coal business of Kennecott for $1.1 billion, and a consortium of companies controlled Peabody-Holding.

Because of a federal contract with the Tennessee Valley Authority, the company was among 153 named in 1978 discrimination complaint with the Department of Labor Office of Federal Contract Compliance Program. The complaint, filed by the Coal Employment Project, a women's advocacy organization, was based upon Executive Order 11246 signed in 1965 by U.S. President Lyndon Johnson, which bars sex discrimination by companies with federal contracts. The complaint called for the hiring of one woman for every three inexperienced men until women constituted 20 percent of the workforce. This legal strategy was successful. Almost 3,000 women were hired by the close of 1979 as underground miners.

In the 1980s, Peabody expanded its operations in the Eastern United States, acquiring the West Virginia coal mines of Armco in 1984. The company sought to broaden its metallurgical coal portfolio through the purchase of Eastern Gas and Fuel Associates' seven West Virginia mines in 1987. Peabody also expanded westward, opening the North Antelope and Rochelle mines in the low sulfur Wyodak seam in the heart of Wyoming's Powder River Basin in 1983 and 1984, respectively.

The passage of the Clean Air Act amendments in 1990 prompted the closure of some Peabody mines. However, other mines under its ownership were able to remain in operation due to the implementation of new equipment and procedures that reduced sulfur dioxide emissions. Stricter requirements outlined in Phase II of the legislation also prompted Peabody to invest in emissions-reducing technologies. In 1990, the U.K.-based conglomerate Hanson, one of the owners of Peabody Holding at the time, bought out the rest of the owners.

In 1993, Peabody Energy expanded their holdings in the Pacific with the acquisition of three mines in Australia and subsequently developed a fourth operation in New South Wales. Peabody also expanded its operations domestically with acquisitions in New Mexico in 1993 and Wyoming in 1994 and assumed a stake in Black Beauty, a Midwest producer, in response to increased demand for metallurgical coal.

=== 2001–2009 ===
In 1996, Hanson demerged Peabody and Eastern Group under the name The Energy Group. When TXU acquired The Energy Group, Peabody was sold to Lehman Brothers Merchant Banking Partners. The company filed an initial public offering (IPO) in May 2001, and since this time it has operated as a publicly traded company. In 2002, Peabody launched its Peabody Energy Australia Coal Co. following the acquisition of the Wilkie Creek Mine in Queensland's Surat Basin. The North Goonyella coal mine was acquired by Peabody in 2004. In October 2006, Peabody completed an acquisition of Excel Coal Limited, an independent coal company in Australia. Peabody paid $1.52 billion for Excel and also assumed $227 million of Excel's debt. At the time, Excel owned three operating mines and three development-stage mines in Australia. Additionally, Excel had an estimated 500 million tons of proven and probable coal reserves.

The company advanced a number of coal-to-liquids and coal-to-gas projects to reduce emissions during the decade. On August 30, 2007, Ernie Fletcher, the governor of the U.S. state of Kentucky signed into state law a bill that will provide approximately $300 million in incentives to Peabody to build a coal gasification plant in that state. The resulting incentives were provisioned in the form of breaks on sales taxes, incentive taxes and coal severance taxes. In 2007, Peabody and a consortium of municipal electric cooperatives began construction on the 1600-megawatt Prairie State Energy Campus clean coal project in Lively Grove, Illinois. The company retained a five percent equity stake in the project, which was expected to begin generating power for customers in 2011. Peabody sold its stake in the Prairie State project to the Wabash Valley Power Association in 2016.

=== 2010–2011: Peabody predicts long-term supercycle in coal prices ===
At the 2010 World Energy Congress, Peabody CEO Gregory Boyce proposed a plan that advocated for the expanded use of coal worldwide, placing emphasis on geographic areas with limited or no access to electricity.

In 2010, former CEO Gregory Boyce told investors that global demand for coal was entering a multi-year growth period, stating "We're in the early stages of a 30-year supercycle in global coal markets."

In 2011 the company reiterated that "the coal supercycle is just getting underway."

=== 2012–2026: Net losses, bankruptcy and return to profitability ===
Peabody reported net losses in excess of $500 million annually for each calendar year during 2012 through 2015, including a loss of nearly $2 billion for 2015.

The company filed for Chapter 11 bankruptcy in April 2016 after reporting a loss of $165 million for the first quarter. It emerged from bankruptcy in April 2017 and started trading on the NYSE with a ticker symbol of BTU.

In October 2017, a judge ruled that Peabody Energy's bankruptcy protected it from "global-warming lawsuits brought by California coastal communities [in July 2017] against fossil-fuel companies."

In 2018, Peabody announced it plans to invest $10 million in a partnership with London-based Arq and completed its purchase of the Shoal Creek Seaborne metallurgical coal mine from Drummond Company, Inc. for $387 million.

In 2021, U.S. coal industry veteran Jim Grech was appointed the new president and CEO of Peabody effective June 1.

In November 2024, Peabody announced plans to acquire the metallurgical coal assets of Anglo-American plc for $3.78 billion, but later terminated the deal stating a fire at Anglo-American's Moranbah North coal mine constituted a material adverse change. Anglo-American began arbitration to seek damages in late 2025.

== Financial results ==
YEAR	$ MILLIONS
2010	774
2011	957
2012	(586)
2013	(525)
2014	(787)
2015	(1,958)
2016	(721)
2017	477
2018	664
2019	(211)
2020	(1,870)
2021	360
2022	1,306
2023	772
2024	383
2025	(53)

Sources:

- 2010 - 2020: Forms 10-K, Securities and Exchange Commission.
- 2021 - 2024: "Peabody Energy Corp". Morningstar, Inc.
- 2025: News release, Peabody Energy, February 5, 2026.

== Lines of business ==
Peabody Energy's world headquarters is in St. Louis. As of 2014, it also maintained offices in London, Beijing, Singapore, Brisbane, Sydney, Essen, Balikpapan, and Jakarta. In the U.S. West, Peabody operates Powder River Basin operations in Wyoming as well as other mining operations in Arizona and New Mexico. Operations in the U.S. Midwest consist of mines in Indiana and Illinois. Peabody also operates a single underground mine in Colorado. All of these assets are occupied with the mining, preparation, and selling of coal to utility companies or steelmakers.

Peabody's Australian operations consist of metallurgical and thermal coal mining operations in Queensland and New South Wales. Purchasers of its coal product include Australian utility companies or steel producers.

The Trading and Brokerage function is primarily concerned with the brokering of coal sales, trading coal, and freight or freight-related contracts. A smaller division of Peabody Energy deals with mining, export, and transportation joint ventures, energy-related commercial activities, and the management of Peabody's operations and holdings. With a growing demand for coal across Asian markets, especially in China, Indonesia, and India, Peabody has expanded its presence in Asia through offices in China, Indonesia, and Singapore.

== Black Mesa controversy ==
In 1964 Peabody Energy subsidiary Peabody Western Coal signed a series of lease agreements with the Navajo tribe and two years later with the Hopi tribe for mineral rights as well as the use of a water source on the Black Mesa, a 2.1-million-acre highland in Northeast Arizona. The company's contracts with the Navajo Nation and Hopi Tribe were approved despite opposition from those who disputed the authority of the official tribal councils. They were also negotiated by natural resources attorney John Sterling Boyden, who represented the Hopi tribe but whose firm had also represented Peabody in other legal matters, contributing to allegations of a conflict of interest.

When rail negotiations to transport coal from the project broke down, Peabody designed a coal slurry pipeline similar to a natural gas pipeline to transport the coal 273 miles to the Mohave Generating Station in Laughlin, Nevada. The company pumped potable water from the underground Navajo Aquifer (N-aquifer) to supply the slurry pipeline, a solution that generated controversy. The Navajo Aquifer is a main source of potable water for the Navajo and Hopi tribes, who use the water for farming and livestock maintenance as well as drinking and other domestic uses. Members of the tribes as well as outside environmental groups have alleged that the pumping of water by Peabody Energy has caused contamination of water sources and a severe decline in potable water. Peabody contends that operations consumed only one percent of the aquifer's water.

Peabody developed and operated two strip mines on the Black Mesa reservation: the Black Mesa Mine and the Kayenta Mine. The Black Mesa Mine suspended operations in 2006 after the mine's sole customer, the Mohave Station, was retired. The site was fully decommissioned in January 2010.

== Misleading investors about climate change ==
In 2015, an investigation by the New York Attorney General concluded that Peabody had misled investors concerning the financial risks to the company caused by climate change. Among other things, the investigation found that Peabody repeatedly denied in public financial filings that it had the ability to predict how the company's business would be impacted by potential regulation of climate change pollution, even though the company and its consultants actually made projections that the company would be severely impacted. The settlement of the case required the company to revise its financial disclosures with the Securities and Exchange Commission. The settlement did not require any financial penalties or admission of legal wrongdoing.

== Environmental record ==
Mining coal for energy production has been the subject of controversy for a long time. The Sierra Club has expressed concern regarding Peabody Energy's initial opposition to the Clean Air Act and other environmental regulations, as well as its support for the expanded use of coal-generated electricity as a means of meeting increasing worldwide demand for energy. The Natural Resources Defense Council has been critical of Peabody's advocacy for expanding coal generated electricity in the U.S., specifically on account of the environmental impacts of surface mining operations. The environmental impact of Peabody's surface mining operations in Muhlenberg County, Kentucky was the subject of criticism in John Prine's 1971 song "Paradise." In Newsweek's 2011 rankings of the least eco-friendly companies in the US, Peabody Energy was ranked #9 out of the top 500 largest US companies based on their environmental impact.

Peabody launched its first land reclamation program, Operation Green Earth, in 1954. Since then, Peabody's activities in pursuit of its mission, specifically concerning environmental sustainability practices, have been recognized by regulators and industry groups, but have raised concerns among its critics, primarily environmental advocacy organizations. The company has taken steps to enact environmental restoration and has been recognized by the United States Department of the Interior for their reclamation efforts.

In response to federal legislation, such as the 1970 Clean Air Act and the 1990 Clean Air Act amendments, and environmental criticism of its mining operations, Peabody has directed investments in technologies and equipment that serve to mitigate adverse environmental effects of their coal mining operations. In 2007, the company became the only non-Chinese equity partner in the 650-megawatt near-zero emissions GreenGen clean-coal project in Tianjin, China. Peabody has also invested in the development of carbon capture technologies and coal-to-gas and coal-to-hydrogen projects.

In 2014, Peabody Energy's CEO told a coal industry conference that coal-fired electricity generation would bring public health benefits in developing nations, specifically improving cold-chain refrigeration of a potential future Ebola vaccine. Peabody's claim was criticized by three public health academics as "an insult", and an "opportunistic attempt and somewhat desperate to relate corporate self-interest to a massive public health crisis".

In Newsweek's 2012 Green Rankings—comparisons of the environmental footprint, management, and transparency of the largest public companies in America—Peabody Energy was ranked 493rd out of 500 in all industries and 29th out of 31 in the energy industry. The company received the worst possible Environmental Impact score.

Peabody Energy often used "self-bonding" to guarantee it could pay for its mine reclamation obligations under the Surface Mining Control and Reclamation Act of 1977. On March 28, 2016, the Wyoming Department of Environmental Quality assured the federal Office of Surface Mining that Peabody Energy's self-bonding remained adequate. Before Peabody Energy declared bankruptcy it held $1.47 billion in self-bonding liabilities, including $900.5 million in Wyoming alone. In 2016, Peabody reached settlement agreements with Illinois, Wyoming, New Mexico, and Indiana related to its self-bonding obligations.

== Marketing, public relations, and lobbying ==
=== American Legislative Exchange Council ===
Kelly Mader represented Peabody Energy on the Private Enterprise Board of the American Legislative Exchange Council (ALEC), and Peabody has funded ALEC.

=== Advanced Energy for Life ===
In 2014 Peabody Energy Corp. launched a pro-coal advertising and public relations campaign named Advanced Energy for Life. The campaign was created by Burson-Marsteller, the world's largest PR firm, and its subsidiary, Proof Integrated Communications.

=== Climate change denial ===
Peabody has been an important actor in organized climate change denial. Until 2015, Peabody had claimed that global warming isn't a threat and emitting carbon dioxide is beneficial instead of being dangerous. The company also funded at least two dozen climate change denial organizations and front groups such as the George C. Marshall Institute, the Institute for Energy Research, Committee for a Constructive Tomorrow, and the Center for the Study of Carbon Dioxide and Global Change as well as scientists being famous for their contrarian opinions, among them Willie Soon, Richard Lindzen and Roy Spencer. Nick Surgey, director of research for the Center for Media and Democracy, commented on the sheer scale of Peabody's funding activities: "We expected to see some denial money, but it looks like Peabody is the treasury for a very substantial part of the climate denial movement." Peabody plans to continue to oppose the Clean Power Plan during its bankruptcy.
