= PSEC =

PSEC may refer to:

- UDP-4-amino-4,6-dideoxy-N-acetyl-beta-L-altrosamine transaminase, an enzyme
- Prairie State Energy Campus
