= David Luechtefeld =

American politician

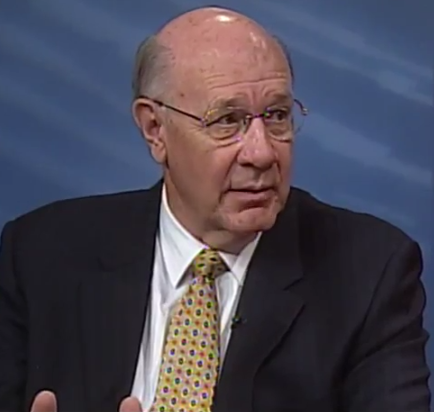

Member of the Illinois Senate from the 58th district
- In office September 1995 – January 2017
- Preceded by: Ralph A. Dunn
- Succeeded by: Paul Schimpf

Personal details
- Born: November 8, 1940 (age 85) Lively Grove, Illinois
- Party: Republican
- Spouse: Florence
- Children: Three sons, One daughter
- Education: St. Louis University (B.A.); Southern Illinois University (M.Ed)
- Profession: Teacher (retired)

David Luechtefeld (born November 8, 1940) is a former Republican member of the Illinois Senate, representing the 58th district from September 1995 until January 2017. During his tenure, he served as the Deputy Minority Leader.

== Early life ==
Luechtefeld was born November 8, 1940, in Lively Grove, Illinois. He graduated high school from Okawville High School in 1958 and earned his bachelor's degree from St. Louis University in 1962. He taught and coached basketball at Okawville High School until he retired in 1993.

== Illinois Senate ==
In September 1995, Luechtefeld was appointed state senator for the 58th district to fill the vacancy left by the resignation of 81-year-old Senator Ralph A. Dunn, who resigned to take care of his wife while taking a position with the Illinois State Treasurer's office. The 58th district included all or portions of St. Clair, Monroe, Washington, Randolph, Jackson and Union counties in Downstate Illinois.

In 1996, Luechtefeld ran against SIU political science professor Barb Brown in what became the most expensive and closest state legislative race of the entire cycle with Brown down by only 127 votes. Controversially, on election night, Monroe County election judges failed to initial approximately 500 ballots. Brown asked for a recount. By state law the decision was left in the hands of the Illinois Senate. The Republican majority Senate seated Luechtefeld. In 1998, Brown ran against Luechtefeld again, but lost by a larger margin. Since then, Luechtefeld has never received less than 60% of the vote.

His committee assignments at one point included Agriculture, Education, Executive, Financial Institutions, and Higher Education. He served as the minority spokesperson on the Education and Higher Education committees. He was also a member of the Subcommittee on Election Law. In June 2015, Senator Luechtefeld announced his retirement after twenty years in Springfield.

== Post-Senate activities ==
On March 6, 2017, Bruce Rauner appointed Luechtefeld to the Illinois Civil Service Commission for a term expiring March 1, 2023. The Commission is tasked to review and approve rule changes to the Illinois Personnel Code, position classifications, and pay plans proposed by Department of Central Management Services, which administers state's merit employment system. It also acts as an impartial review board for employees who appeal department decisions.
