= Beaucoup =

Beaucoup is a French word meaning "many". It may also refer to:

- Beaucoup, Illinois
- Beaucoup Township, Washington County, Illinois
- Beau Coup, a rock band from Cleveland, Ohio
