= Prairie State Energy Campus =

Coal-fired power plant in Illinois, U.S.

- Country: United States
- Location: Lively Grove Township, Washington County, near Marissa, Illinois
- Coordinates: 38°16′40″N 89°40′4″W
- Status: Operational
- Commission date: 2012
- Owner: Prairie State Energy Campus (consortium)

Thermal power station
- Turbine technology: Coal

Power generation
- Units operational: 2
- Nameplate capacity: 1,600 MW

Prairie State Energy Campus is a 1,600 megawatt base load, coal-fired, electrical power station and coal mine near Marissa, Illinois, southeast of St. Louis, Missouri. Prairie State Energy Campus (PSEC) features low levels of regulated emissions compared to other coal-fired power stations, capturing sulfur from high-sulfur coal mined nearby instead of transporting low-sulfur coal from elsewhere.

Ken Bone, a power plant worker who asked a question during a 2016 Presidential debate, is employed at Prairie State. He is a Control Room Operator.

== Project ==
Proposed and led by Peabody Energy Corporation, the project is jointly owned by public electric utilities with Peabody initially retaining 5% ownership. It is operated by Prairie State Generating Company, LLC. The first 800 MW generator went online in June and the second in November 2012. The project's Lively Grove underground mine was constructed to produce 6 million tons of high sulfur coal per year. In 2019 it was the 26th largest coal mine in the country, producing 6.4 million short tons of coal.

PSEC stated it will be "among the cleanest major coal-fueled plants in the nation" through use of pollution mitigation technology, producing as low as one-fifth the levels of regulated pollutants as typical U.S. coal-fired plants. Noting that projected emissions nevertheless include 25,000 tons of soot and smog-forming pollutants yearly, the Sierra Club and other organizations unsuccessfully sued to stop the EPA granting an air permit.

As of 2/6/2019, the plant's ownership consists of nine municipal public power agencies including American Municipal Power, Inc. (23.3%), Illinois Municipal Electric Agency (15.2%), Indiana Municipal Power Agency (12.6%), Missouri Joint Municipal Electric Utility Commission (12.3%), Prairie Power Inc.(8.2%), Southern Illinois Power Cooperative (7.9%), Kentucky Municipal Power Agency (7.8%), Northern Illinois Municipal Power Agency (7.6%), Wabash Valley Power Association (5.1%).

== Carbon dioxide emissions ==
During construction the Chicago Tribune asserted PSEC would be the "largest source of carbon dioxide built in the United States in a quarter-century." The company projected a 15% reduction in carbon dioxide (CO_{2}) pollution compared with other coal-fired power plants based on its use of efficient supercritical steam generators and no emissions from transporting coal.

Judging that regulatory limits on carbon emissions were not likely in the near future, Peabody chose not to employ a more expensive integrated gasification combined cycle design that could more easily be retrofitted with carbon capture technology. The Environmental Protection Agency first proposed limits in March 2012. The limit of 1000 lbs CO_{2} emissions per megawatt-hour electricity would require future coal-powered generating stations to capture approximately half of their CO_{2} output. The limit would not apply to existing and under-construction generating stations, including PSEC.

In 2020 PSEC was among the ten largest industrial sources of CO_{2} in the United States. The Biden administration took office with a platform of transitioning US electrical generation to net zero CO_{2} emissions by 2035. At the 2035 target date the plant will still have decades of expected lifespan remaining.

A 2021 Illinois law requires PSEC plus one other municipally owned coal power station to reduce their carbon emissions by 45% by 2035 and become carbon-free by 2045. Other coal and oil-fired power stations in Illinois over 25 MWe must become carbon-free by 2030, and natural gas plants by 2045.

== Costs ==
PSEC started delivering electricity in 2012 at prices well above market rates. Some of its investors resell the energy at a loss, some raise consumer rates, and two backed out of the project. PSEC's original $2 billion estimated cost attracted municipal electric utilities to invest and to sign 28 year contracts. However, as of early 2010 the estimated cost had increased to $4.4 billion, requiring investors to borrow more money and raising the projected cost of electricity to undesirable levels. Peabody in response capped construction costs at "approximately $4 billion" excluding some costs such as coal development and transmission lines. In January 2013, with many municipalities adversely impacted by the high prices, the SEC subpoenaed information from Peabody. In a bid to exit its share of the Prairie State project, the City of Hermann, Missouri, filed a lawsuit in March 2015 against the Missouri Joint Municipal Electric Utility Commission and the Missouri Public Energy Pool, claiming that its share of $1.5 billion in debt issued to support Prairie State imposed an unconstitutionally high level of debt on the city.

Peabody divested its 5.06% stake in the project in 2016, accepting $57 million for its original investment of nearly $250 million. The buyer was Wabash Valley Power Association, a Midwest cooperative.

== See also ==
- Longview Power Plant
