= Clarmin, Illinois =

- Unincorporated community
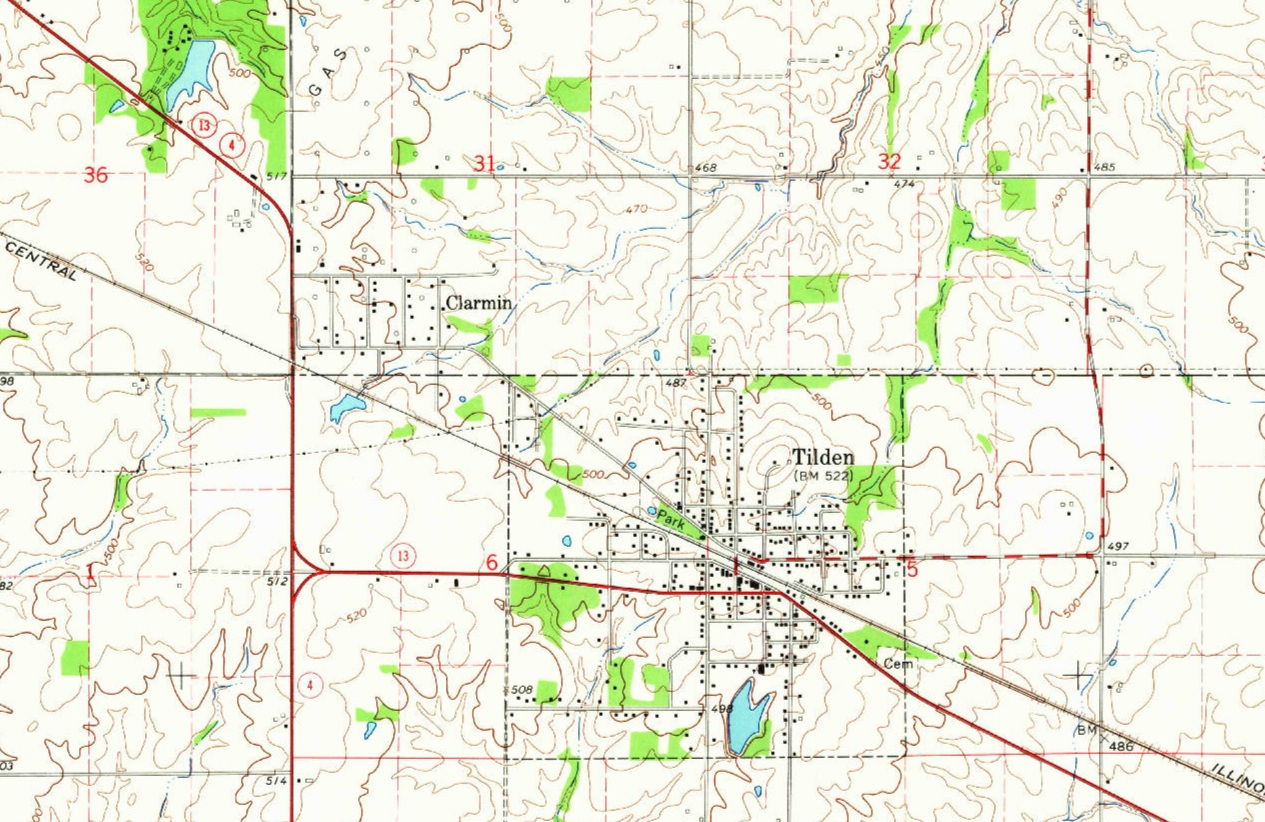
- Clarmin and Tilden on 1965 USGS map

- Location within Illinois Location within the United States
- Coordinates: 38°13′16″N 89°41′58″W
- Country: United States
- State: Illinois
- County: Washington
- Township: Lively Grove
- Elevation: 502 ft (153 m)
- Time zone: UTC-6 (Central (CST))
  - Summer (DST): UTC-5 (CDT)
- Area code: 618
- GNIS feature ID: 406179

Clarmin is an unincorporated community in Lively Grove Township, Washington County, Illinois, United States. Clarmin is located along Illinois Route 4 and Illinois Route 13, 1 mile (1.6 km) northwest of Tilden.

Clarmin was laid out by two judges in 1908, Green and Bernreuter, from Nashville, Illinois, forming the name from the names of their wives, Clara and Minnie.

The community was reported to have a population of 50 in 1968.
