= Posen, Washington County, Illinois =

Posen, Illinois
- Unincorporated community
- Location within Illinois Location within the United States
- Coordinates: 38°15′30″N 89°20′08″W
- Country: United States
- State: Illinois
- County: Washington
- Township: Bolo
- Elevation: 489 ft (149 m)
- Time zone: UTC-6 (Central (CST))
  - Summer (DST): UTC-5 (CDT)
- Area code: 618
- GNIS feature ID: 423082

Posen is an unincorporated community in Bolo Township, Washington County, Illinois, United States. Posen is 6.4 miles (10.3 km) southeast of Nashville. Since 1901, Our Lady of Perpetual Help Church, a member of the Diocese of Belleville has been located here. As with many small homestead communities, little documentation of Posen exists online despite historical and local significance. The community was named after Poznań, Poland because much like the rest of Washington County, Posen was settled entirely by Poles, some of whom were secular Polish Jews before converting to Roman Catholicism. Having dwindled in population with time, the only remaining buildings apart from the Roman Catholic parish are a handful of residential homes, an old storefront converted into a residential unit, a large graveyard of the parishioners and pioneers, the Bolo Township Hall, and an alpaca farm. The original church structure was replaced in the late 1960s.

== Photographs ==
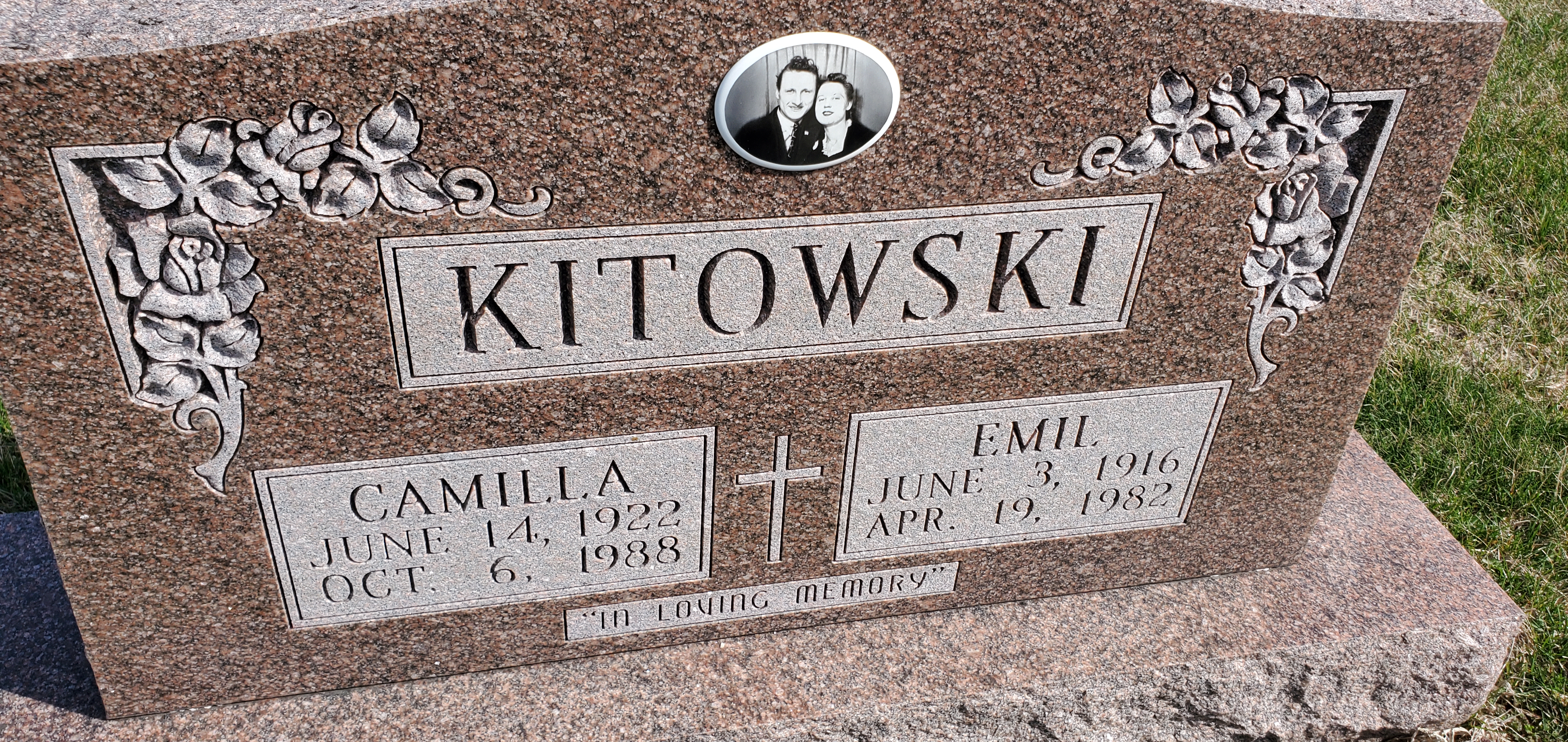
Headstone of parishioners in the cemetery

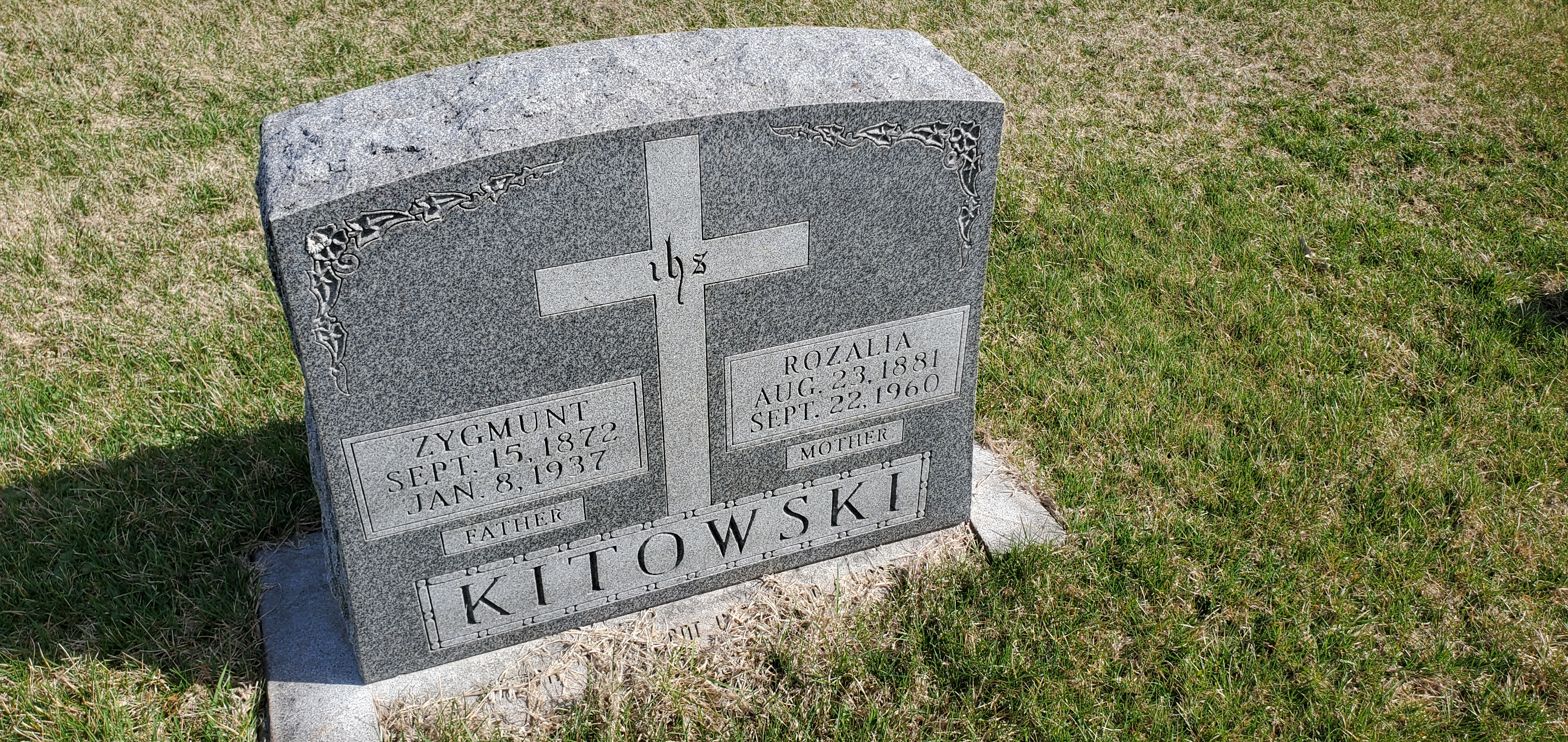
Headstone in the graveyard

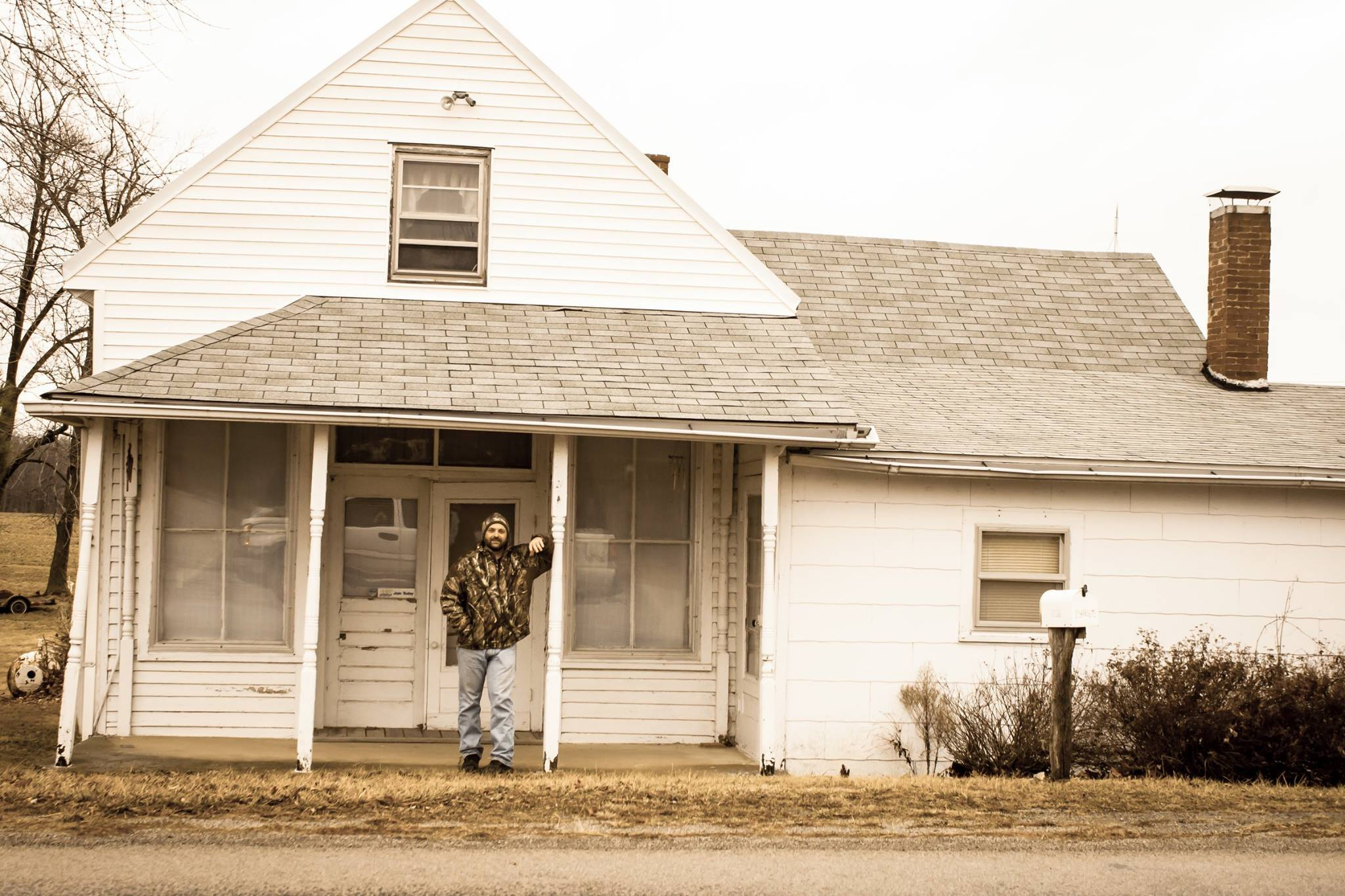
Malawy settler descendent in front of the former Mozelewski General Store
