= Nashville Township =

Nashville Township may refer to:

- Nashville Township, Howard County, Arkansas, in Howard County, Arkansas
- Nashville Township, Washington County, Illinois
- Nashville Township, Martin County, Minnesota
- Nashville Township, Barton County, Missouri
- Nashville Township, Nash County, North Carolina, in Nash County, North Carolina
