= Hoyleton =

Hoyleton may refer to:

- Hoyleton, Illinois
- Hoyleton, South Australia
