= Pyramid, Illinois =

- Unincorporated community
- Location within Illinois Location within the United States
- Coordinates: 38°20′03″N 89°13′40″W
- Country: United States
- State: Illinois
- County: Washington
- Township: Ashley
- Elevation: 561 ft (171 m)
- Time zone: UTC-6 (Central (CST))
  - Summer (DST): UTC-5 (CDT)
- Area code: 618
- GNIS feature ID: 423095

Pyramid (also known as Tuckerville) is an unincorporated community in Ashley Township, Washington County, Illinois, United States. The community is located at the junction of U.S. Route 51 and Illinois Route 15. It was once the site of the Egyptian Bus Company, which was later bought by Greyhound.
