= Plum Hill, Illinois =

- Unincorporated community
- Location within Illinois Location within the United States
- Coordinates: 38°21′46″N 89°30′31″W
- Country: United States
- State: Illinois
- County: Washington
- Township: Plum Hill
- Elevation: 472 ft (144 m)
- Time zone: UTC-6 (Central (CST))
  - Summer (DST): UTC-5 (CDT)
- Area code: 618
- GNIS feature ID: 415956

Plum Hill is an unincorporated community in Plum Hill Township, Washington County, Illinois, United States. Plum Hill is located along Illinois Route 15, 7.1 miles (11.4 km) west-northwest of Nashville.
