= Ashley Township =

Ashley Township may refer to the following townships in the United States:

- Ashley Township, Washington County, Illinois
- Ashley Township, Stearns County, Minnesota
