= John Lively =

John Lively may refer to:

- John Lively (politician), member of the Oregon House of Representatives
- John L. Lively, American horse racing jockey
- John Lively, a victim in the Lively massacre
