= Cordes, Illinois =

- Unincorporated community
- Location within Illinois Location within the United States
- Coordinates: 38°17′46″N 89°27′26″W
- Country: United States
- State: Illinois
- County: Washington
- Township: Pilot Knob
- Elevation: 505 ft (154 m)
- Time zone: UTC-6 (Central (CST))
  - Summer (DST): UTC-5 (CDT)
- Area code: 618
- GNIS feature ID: 422580

Cordes is an unincorporated community in Pilot Knob Township, Washington County, Illinois, United States. Cordes is located along Cordes Road, 3 miles (4.8 km) northwest of Oakdale.
