= Hoyleton Township, Washington County, Illinois =

Hoyleton Township
- Township

- Location of Illinois in the United States
- Coordinates: 38°27′07″N 89°18′56″W
- Country: United States
- State: Illinois
- County: Washington
- Settled: November 6, 1888

Area
  - Total: 51.07 sq mi (132.3 km^{2})
  - Land: 51.07 sq mi (132.3 km^{2})
  - Water: 0 sq mi (0 km^{2})
- Elevation: 472 ft (144 m)

Population (2010)
  - Estimate (2016): 1,095
  - Density: 22.4/sq mi (8.6/km^{2})
- Time zone: UTC-6 (CST)
  - Summer (DST): UTC-5 (CDT)
- FIPS code: 17-189-36360

Hoyleton Township is located in Washington County, Illinois. As of the 2010 census, its population was 1,142 and it contained 459 housing units. The village of Hoyleton is entirely within Hoyleton Township, and the eastern part of the village of New Minden is also within the township.

== Geography ==
According to the 2010 census, the township has a total area of 51.07 square miles (132.3 km^{2}), all of which is land.

== Demographics ==
Historical population
Census	Pop.	Note	%±
2016 (est.)	1,095
U.S. Decennial Census
