= George E. Coghill =

American anatomist (1872–1941)

George Ellett Coghill
- Born: March 17, 1872; Beaucoup, Illinois, U.S.
- Died: July 23, 1941 (aged 69); Gainesville, Florida, U.S.

George Ellett Coghill (March 17, 1872 – July 23, 1941) was an American philosopher anatomist best known for his work relating neuromuscular system development with movement patterns in embryos. Coghill performed much of the empirical work supporting the theory that development of movement is not simply the accumulation of individualized reflexes, but rather a result of the differentiation of generalized total movement.

== Early years ==
Born in Beaucoup, Illinois, as the fifth child of John Waller and Elisabeth Tucker Coghill, George started college at Shurtleff College in Alton, Illinois. He later transferred to and graduated from Brown University with a bachelors and two doctorate degrees. In 1899, Coghill began teaching biology at the University of New Mexico. In New Mexico, he met Muriel Anderson and the two would wed in 1900, with the marriage producing five children.

In 1902, he was hired as a professor at Pacific University in Forest Grove, Oregon. Here, he acted as the corresponding secretary for the Oregon State Academy of Sciences. He remained there until 1906 when he moved further down the Willamette Valley and began teaching at Willamette University in Salem. He would later teach at Denison University and at the University of Kansas.

== Scientific career ==
Coghill studied Ambystoma tigrinum (the tiger salamander), to investigate the relationship between the development of behavior and the development of the nervous system. When observing the development of movement in Ambystoma tigrinum, Coghill noticed that the first observable movements were in the trunk of the Ambystoma embryos. These movements developed over time from unspecific, sometimes spontaneous, myogenic motions to unilateral flexures to concerted motions that resembled swimming. Coghill hypothesized that this movement was the precursor to later feeding behavior or walking behavior.

In Coghill's studies, Ambystoma limb movement was first observed as a result of total body movement and was only later observed as a result of individualized movement that resembled locomotion; thus, the movement observed in a fully developed Ambystoma embryo is the result of first generalized movement, then the differentiated movement of specific limbs within the totality of organized movement. Coghill's theory for how the individualization of limb movement emerged from general patterns mirrored that of Sherrington's law of reciprocal innervation; the movement of a specific limb involves the inhibition of activity of the rest of the body and, thus, the movement of a particular limb requires excitation of one part of the body and inhibition of the rest of the body. This behavior was only descriptive towards species-specific Ambystoma somatic movement. Coghill extensively detailed his work on the development and integration of the central and peripheral system (both afferent and efferent pathways) in a series of papers collectively called "Correlated anatomical and physiological studies of the growth of the nervous system of Amphibia."

In addition to his own scientific studies, Coghill was also a managing editor for the Journal of Comparative Neurology between the years of 1927 and 1933.

== Death ==
At the time of his death, Coghill was studying how anatomical changes contributed to the development of individual fin movements in killifish and toadfish and limb movements in reptiles and opossums. Though he wasn't able to finish the experiments with these animals, Coghill was anticipating that the differential fin and limb movement developed in a similar fashion as the Ambystoma. At the time of his death, Coghill was also working on a manuscript entitled "Principles of Development in Psycho-organismal Behavior." George E. Coghill died in Gainesville, Florida on July 23, 1941.

== Awards ==
He received the Award of the Daniel Giraud Elliot Medal in 1930, from the National Academy of Sciences, for his work entitled Correlated Anatomical and Physiological Studies of the Growth of the Nervous System of Amphibia which he wrote during his time at the University of Kansas . He was elected to both the National Academy of Sciences and the American Philosophical Society in 1935.
