= Stone Church, Illinois =

- Unincorporated community
- Location within Illinois Location within the United States
- Coordinates: 38°21′01″N 89°37′31″W
- Country: United States
- State: Illinois
- County: Washington
- Township: Johannisburg
- Elevation: 459 ft (140 m)
- Time zone: UTC-6 (Central (CST))
  - Summer (DST): UTC-5 (CDT)
- Area code: 618
- GNIS feature ID: 419162

Stone Church is an unincorporated community in Johannisburg Township, Washington County, Illinois, United States. Stone Church is 5 miles (8.0 km) west of St. Libory.
