= Venedy Township, Washington County, Illinois =

Venedy Township
- Township

- Location of Illinois in the United States
- Coordinates: 38°25′15″N 89°38′02″W
- Country: United States
- State: Illinois
- County: Washington
- Settled: November 6, 1888

Area
  - Total: 22.36 sq mi (57.9 km^{2})
  - Land: 22.26 sq mi (57.7 km^{2})
  - Water: 0.09 sq mi (0.23 km^{2})
- Elevation: 420 ft (130 m)

Population (2010)
  - Estimate (2016): 392
  - Density: 18.1/sq mi (7.0/km^{2})
- Time zone: UTC-6 (CST)
  - Summer (DST): UTC-5 (CDT)
- FIPS code: 17-189-77434

Venedy Township is located in Washington County, Illinois. As of the 2010 census, its population was 404 and it contained 201 housing units.

== Geography ==
According to the 2010 census, the township has a total area of 22.36 square miles (57.9 km^{2}), of which 22.26 square miles (57.7 km^{2}) (or 99.55%) is land and 0.09 square miles (0.23 km^{2}) (or 0.40%) is water.

== Demographics ==
Historical population
Census	Pop.	Note	%±
2016 (est.)	392
U.S. Decennial Census
