= Washington County State Recreation Area =

State park in Illinois, United States

- IUCN category V (protected landscape/seascape)
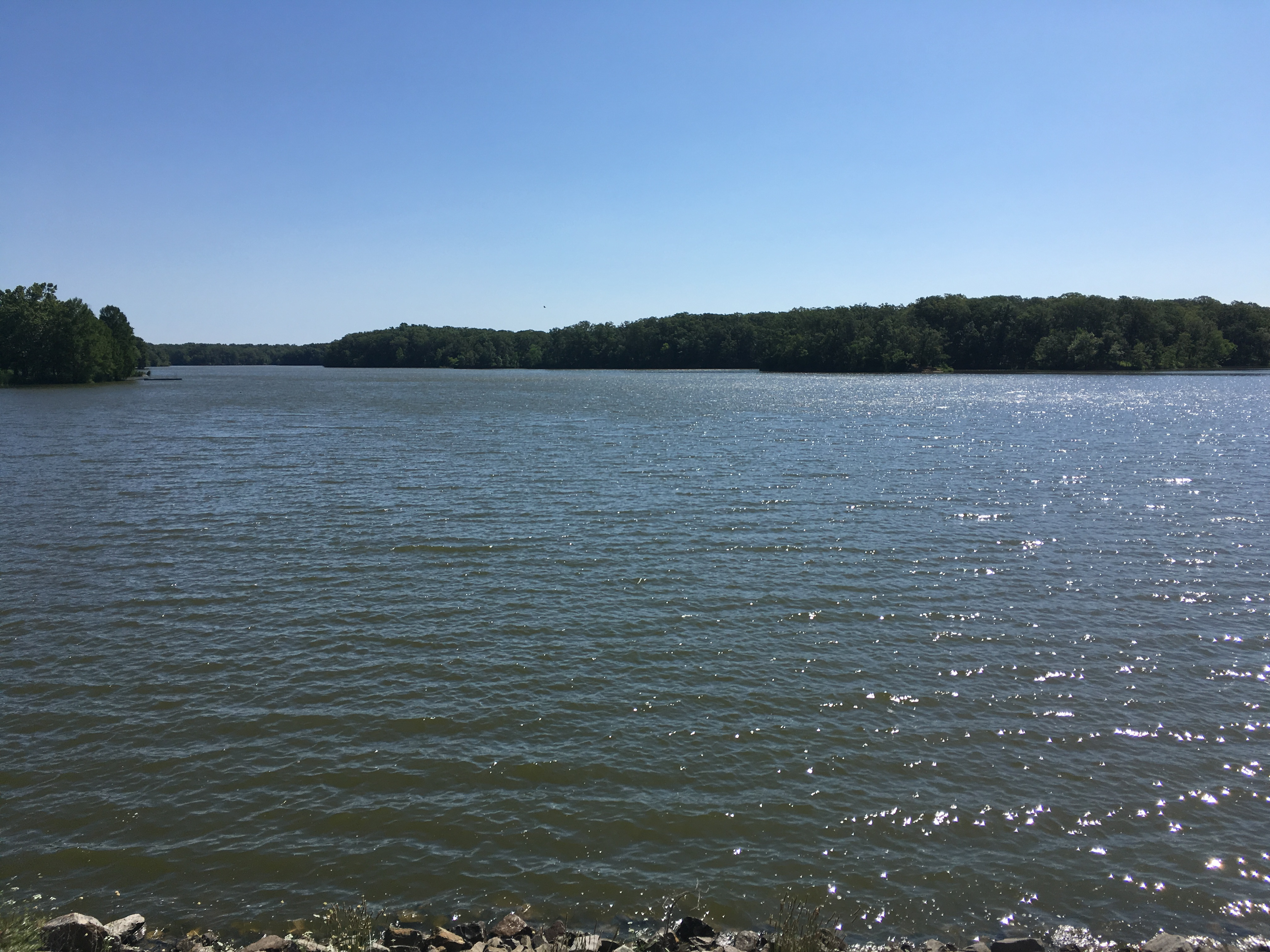

- Location within Illinois Location within the United States
- Location: Washington County, Illinois, United States
- Nearest city: Nashville, Illinois
- Coordinates: 38°17′20″N 89°20′52″W
- Area: 900 acres (360 ha)
- Established: 1959
- Governing body: Illinois Department of Natural Resources

Washington County State Recreation Area is an Illinois state park on 900 acres (360 ha) in Washington County, Illinois, United States.
