= Ralph A. Dunn =

American businessman and politician

Member of the Illinois House of Representatives
- In office 1973–1985

Personal details
- Born: February 28, 1914 Pinckneyville, Illinois, U.S.
- Died: May 3, 2004 (aged 90) Du Quoin, Illinois, U.S.

Ralph A. Dunn (February 28, 1914 – May 3, 2004) was an American businessman and politician.

Ralph A. Dunn was born in Pinckneyville, Illinois, on February 28, 1914. He graduated Pinckneyville Community High School. He entered the real estate business in 1939. Dunn was also in the concrete business and owned a car dealership. He was married to Ellen Fones, had four children, and lived in Du Quoin, Illinois. He was a delegate to the 1968 Republican National Convention. The next year, he was elected as a delegate to the Sixth Illinois Constitutional Convention, which wrote the most recent version of the Illinois Constitution. Dunn served in the Illinois House of Representatives from 1973 to 1985 and was a Republican. He then served in the Illinois State Senate from 1985 until 1995. After a tough reelection fight in the 1992 general election against Democratic candidate Barbara Brown, Dunn resigned from the Illinois Senate in 1995 to accept a position with the Illinois Treasurer. Republicans appointed David Luechtefeld his successor. On May 3, 2004, Dunn died of complications from pneumonia in a hospital in Du Quoin, Illinois.
