= Covington Township, Washington County, Illinois =

Covington Township
- Township

- Location of Illinois in the United States
- Coordinates: 38°26′22″N 89°25′21″W
- Country: United States
- State: Illinois
- County: Washington
- Settled: November 6, 1888

Area
  - Total: 39.69 sq mi (102.8 km^{2})
  - Land: 39.62 sq mi (102.6 km^{2})
  - Water: 0.07 sq mi (0.18 km^{2})
- Elevation: 433 ft (132 m)

Population (2010)
  - Estimate (2016): 404
  - Density: 10.5/sq mi (4.1/km^{2})
- Time zone: UTC-6 (CST)
  - Summer (DST): UTC-5 (CDT)
- FIPS code: 17-189-17042

Covington Township is located in Washington County, Illinois. As of the 2010 census, its population was 418 and it contained 193 housing units.

== Geography ==
According to the 2010 census, the township has a total area of 39.69 square miles (102.8 km^{2}), of which 39.62 square miles (102.6 km^{2}) (or 99.82%) is land and 0.07 square miles (0.18 km^{2}) (or 0.18%) is water.

== Demographics ==
Historical population
Census	Pop.	Note	%±
2016 (est.)	404
U.S. Decennial Census
