= Gregory H. Boyce =

American businessman

- Education: University of Arizona
- Occupation: Businessman

Gregory H. Boyce is an American businessman.

== Biography ==
=== Education ===
Gregory H. Boyce received a Bachelor of Science degree in Mining Engineering from the University of Arizona in Tucson, Arizona. He attended the six-week Advanced Management Program at Harvard Business School.

=== Career ===
Boyce served as the executive assistant to the vice chairman of Standard Oil of Ohio from 1983 to 1984. He then served as the president of Kennecott Minerals from 1993 to 1994. He served as the chief executive officer and president of the energy division for the United States of Rio Tinto from 1994 to 1999. He then served as the chief executive of the energy division of Rio Tinto globally from 2000 to 2003.

Boyce served as the chief operating officer of Peabody Energy from 2003 to 2005 and as its president from 2003 to 2007. He became chief executive officer in 2006 and executive chairman in 2007. Boyce retired from the CEO and chairman roles at the end of 2015. Peabody Energy filed for Chapter 11 bankruptcy on April 13, 2016.

He became a director of Marathon Oil in 2008 and was appointed lead independent director in 2019. Boyce is a former chairman of the National Mining Association. He has served on the boards of directors of Marathon Oil since 2008 and Monsanto since 2013. He is a member of the Business Roundtable and The Business Council. He also served on the board of directors of the U.S.-China Business Council and previously served on the board of trustees at Washington University in St. Louis. He is also the chairman of the Coal Industry Advisory Board of the International Energy Agency and a member of the National Coal Council.
