= Lively Grove, Illinois =

- Unincorporated community
- Location within Illinois Location within the United States
- Coordinates: 38°18′23″N 89°36′41″W
- Country: United States
- State: Illinois
- County: Washington
- Townships: Johannisburg and Lively Grove
- Elevation: 499 ft (152 m)
- Time zone: UTC-6 (Central (CST))
  - Summer (DST): UTC-5 (CDT)
- Area code: 618
- GNIS feature ID: 412448

Lively Grove is an unincorporated community in Johannisburg and Lively Grove Townships, Washington County, Illinois, United States. Lively Grove is located on Illinois Route 153, 6.5 miles (10.5 km) northwest of Oakdale. Lively Grove is approximately 3.6 miles (5.8 km) from Elkton. Its main attraction is the Waller's Market. A major local industry is the mining of coal.
