= New Minden, Illinois =

New Minden
- Village
- Location of New Minden in Washington County, Illinois.
- Coordinates: 38°26′17″N 89°22′21″W
- Country: United States
- State: Illinois
- County: Washington

Area
  - Total: 0.28 sq mi (0.72 km^{2})
  - Land: 0.28 sq mi (0.72 km^{2})
  - Water: 0 sq mi (0.00 km^{2})
- Elevation: 459 ft (140 m)

Population (2020)
  - Total: 175
  - Density: 632.0/sq mi (244.03/km^{2})
- Time zone: UTC-6 (CST)
  - Summer (DST): UTC-5 (CDT)
- ZIP code: 62263
- Area code: 618
- FIPS code: 17-52714
- GNIS ID: 2399478

New Minden is a village in Washington County, Illinois, United States. As of the 2020 census, New Minden had a population of 175. It possessed a post office from 1868 to 1976.

== History ==
=== 2013 tornado ===
At approximately noon on November 17, 2013, an EF4 tornado ripped through the town. It destroyed a few houses and caused major damage to St. John's Evangelical Lutheran Church. The tornado also caused major damage to Flying M Ranch, which is just northeast of town and caused damage in the Hoyleton area. The tornado was on the ground for 10.6 miles (17.1 km) and had winds estimated at 180 miles per hour (290 km/h). The tornado resulted in two deaths in the New Minden area.

== Geography ==
According to the 2010 census, New Minden has a total area of 0.31 square miles (0.80 km^{2}), all land.

New Minden is located 3 miles (5 km) north of Interstate 64's exit 50. Illinois Routes 127 and 177 intersect in the town.

== Demographics ==
Historical population
Census	Pop.	Note	%±
1880	145		—
1890	217		49.7%
1900	226		4.1%
1910	245		8.4%
1920	232		−5.3%
1930	164		−29.3%
1940	152		−7.3%
1950	160		5.3%
1960	166		3.8%
1970	188		13.3%
1980	223		18.6%
1990	219		−1.8%
2000	204		−6.8%
2010	215		5.4%
2020	175		−18.6%
U.S. Decennial Census

As of the census of 2000, there were 204 people, 88 households, and 62 families residing in the village. The population density was 741.8 inhabitants per square mile (286.4/km^{2}). There were 98 housing units at an average density of 356.4 per square mile (137.6/km^{2}). The racial makeup of the village was 99.51% White, and 0.49% from two or more races. Hispanic or Latino of any race were 1.47% of the population.

There were 88 households, out of which 28.4% had children under the age of 18 living with them, 54.5% were married couples living together, 11.4% had a female householder with no husband present, and 29.5% were non-families. 26.1% of all households were made up of individuals, and 15.9% had someone living alone who was 65 years of age or older. The average household size was 2.32 and the average family size was 2.76.

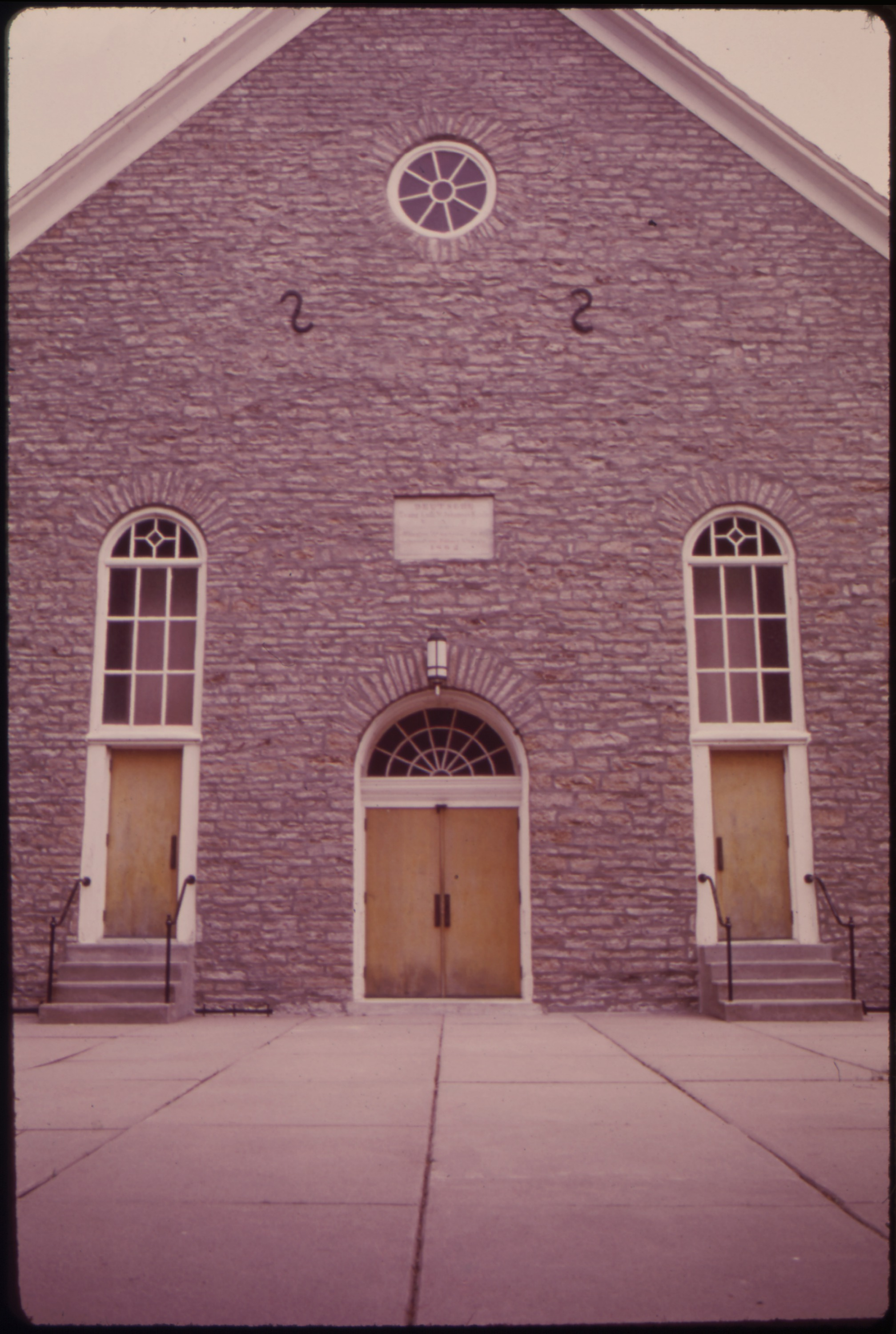
St. John's Lutheran Church in New Minden

In the village, the population was spread out, with 25.0% under the age of 18, 5.4% from 18 to 24, 29.9% from 25 to 44, 21.6% from 45 to 64, and 18.1% who were 65 years of age or older. The median age was 38 years. For every 100 females, there were 75.9 males. For every 100 females age 18 and over, there were 71.9 males.

The median income for a household in the village was $41,875, and the median income for a family was $45,417. Males had a median income of $30,000 versus $19,286 for females. The per capita income for the village was $17,942. None of the families and 2.5% of the population were living below the poverty line, including no under eighteens and 10.0% of those over 64.

== Religion ==
New Minden is home to one of the original 14 churches of the Lutheran Church–Missouri Synod, St. John's Evangelical Lutheran Church (1847).
