= Okawville, Illinois =

Okawville
- Village
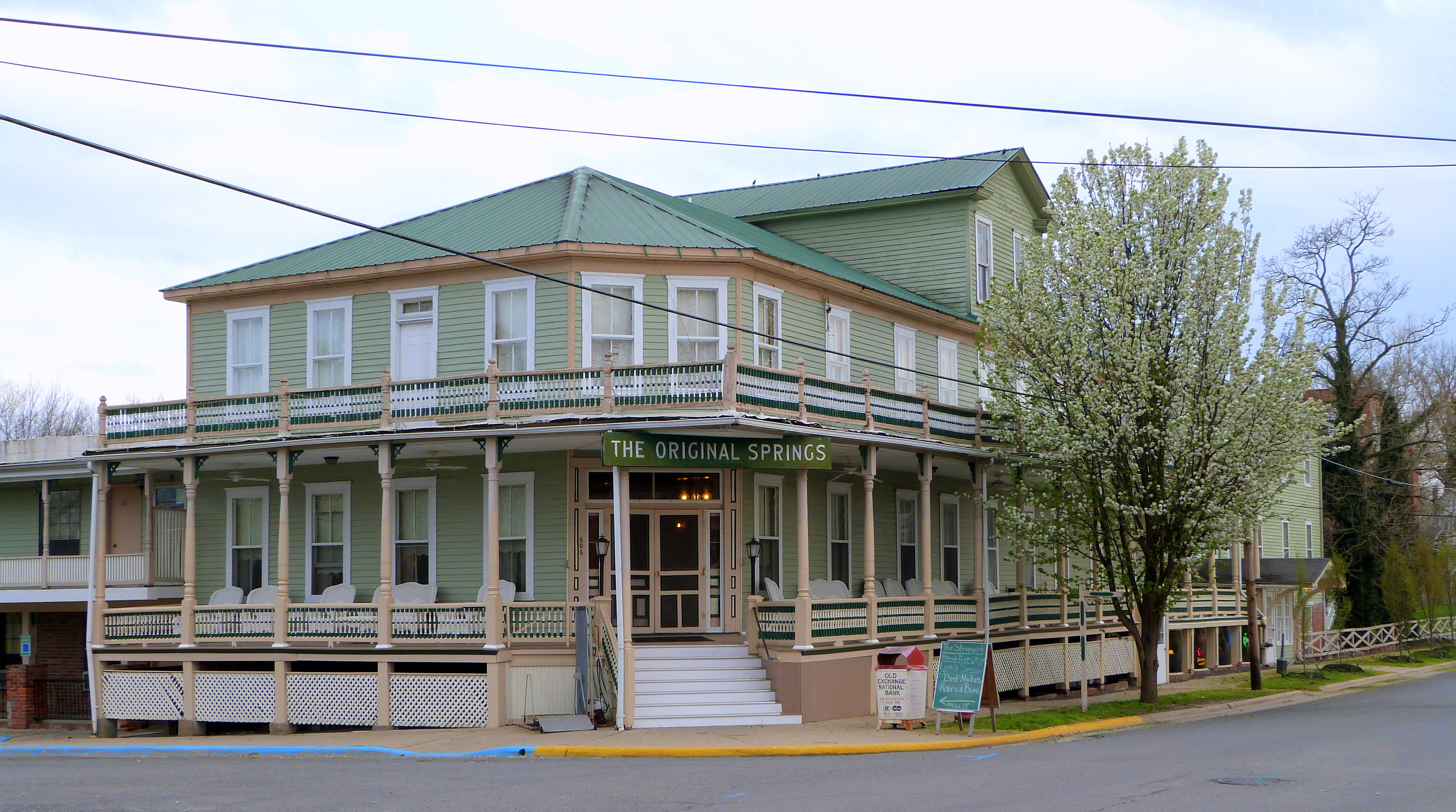
- Original Springs Hotel and Bathhouse, a historic site in the village

- Location of Okawville in Washington County, Illinois.
- Coordinates: 38°26′04″N 89°32′53″W
- Country: United States
- State: Illinois
- County: Washington

Area
  - Total: 2.02 sq mi (5.24 km^{2})
  - Land: 2.02 sq mi (5.24 km^{2})
  - Water: 0 sq mi (0.00 km^{2})
- Elevation: 430 ft (130 m)

Population (2020)
  - Total: 1,369
  - Density: 676.2/sq mi (261.07/km^{2})
- Time zone: UTC-6 (CST)
  - Summer (DST): UTC-5 (CDT)
- ZIP code: 62271
- Area code: 618
- FIPS code: 17-55470
- GNIS ID: 2399566
- Website: www.myokawville.com

Okawville is a village in Washington County, Illinois, United States. As of the 2020 census, Okawville had a population of 1,369.

== History ==
Okawville was originally known simply as "Okaw," from an early name of the Kaskaskia River that derived from the Mississippi Valley French au Kaskaskies ("to the Kaskaskias"). The post office was known as Okaw from its establishment in 1836 until 1872, when the name was changed to Okawville.

In the late 19th and early 20th century Okawville was a prominent spa community. The first Okawville Springs Hotel was established in 1867.

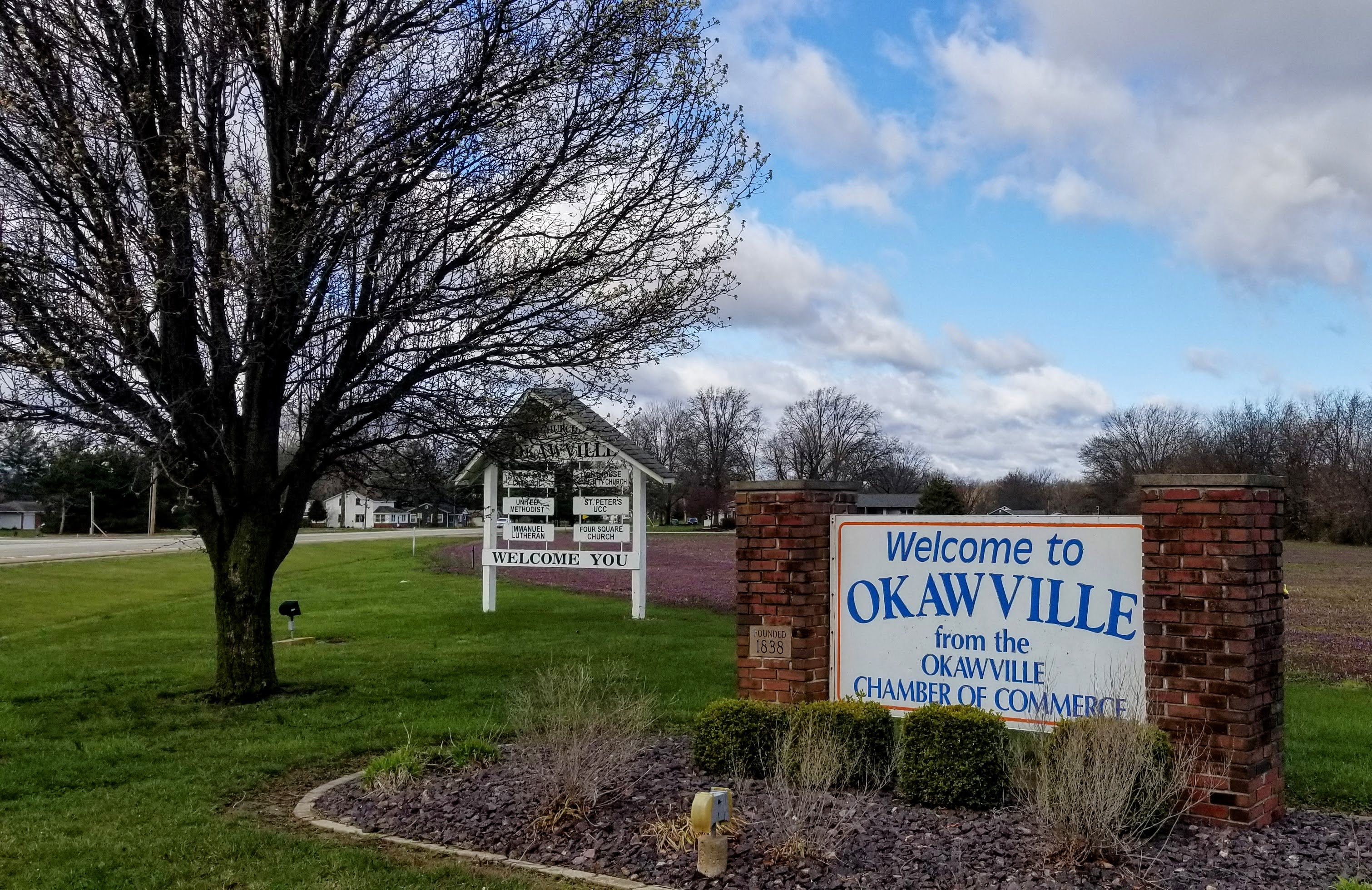
Okawville welcome sign

== Geography ==
According to the 2010 census, Okawville has a total area of 2.06 square miles (5.34 km^{2}), all land.

== Demographics ==
Historical population
Census	Pop.	Note	%±
1880	482		—
1890	472		−2.1%
1900	544		15.3%
1910	579		6.4%
1920	614		6.0%
1930	647		5.4%
1940	708		9.4%
1950	855		20.8%
1960	931		8.9%
1970	992		6.6%
1980	1,337		34.8%
1990	1,274		−4.7%
2000	1,355		6.4%
2010	1,434		5.8%
2020	1,369		−4.5%
U.S. Decennial Census

=== 2020 census ===
As of the 2020 census, Okawville had a population of 1,369. The median age was 40.4 years. 23.0% of residents were under the age of 18 and 20.5% of residents were 65 years of age or older. For every 100 females there were 96.7 males, and for every 100 females age 18 and over there were 98.1 males age 18 and over.

0.0% of residents lived in urban areas, while 100.0% lived in rural areas.

There were 573 households in Okawville, of which 30.4% had children under the age of 18 living in them. Of all households, 52.0% were married-couple households, 16.4% were households with a male householder and no spouse or partner present, and 24.4% were households with a female householder and no spouse or partner present. About 30.7% of all households were made up of individuals and 14.6% had someone living alone who was 65 years of age or older.

There were 653 housing units, of which 12.3% were vacant. The homeowner vacancy rate was 2.5% and the rental vacancy rate was 13.8%.

Racial composition as of the 2020 census
Race	Number	Percent
White	1,288	94.1%
Black or African American	5	0.4%
American Indian and Alaska Native	10	0.7%
Asian	6	0.4%
Native Hawaiian and Other Pacific Islander	6	0.4%
Some other race	3	0.2%
Two or more races	51	3.7%
Hispanic or Latino (of any race)	19	1.4%

=== 2000 census ===
As of the census of 2000, there were 1,355 people, 569 households, and 372 families residing in the village. The population density was 668.6 inhabitants per square mile (258.1/km^{2}). There were 617 housing units at an average density of 304.4 per square mile (117.5/km^{2}). The racial makeup of the village was 98.23% White, 0.37% African American, 0.52% Native American, 0.15% Asian, 0.22% from other races, and 0.52% from two or more races. Hispanic or Latino of any race were 0.37% of the population.

There were 569 households, out of which 29.5% had children under the age of 18 living with them, 55.9% were married couples living together, 6.5% had a female householder with no husband present, and 34.6% were non-families. 30.4% of all households were made up of individuals, and 16.9% had someone living alone who was 65 years of age or older. The average household size was 2.38 and the average family size was 2.98.

In the village, the population was spread out, with 24.8% under the age of 18, 7.2% from 18 to 24, 28.1% from 25 to 44, 22.2% from 45 to 64, and 17.6% who were 65 years of age or older. The median age was 38 years. For every 100 females, there were 97.5 males. For every 100 females age 18 and over, there were 93.4 males.

The median income for a household in the village was $37,448, and the median income for a family was $50,089. Males had a median income of $32,226 versus $22,813 for females. The per capita income for the village was $19,476. About 3.6% of families and 6.5% of the population were below the poverty line, including 5.6% of those under age 18 and 9.3% of those age 65 or over.

== Education ==
Okawville is home to Immanuel Lutheran School, Okawville Grade School, and Okawville High School.

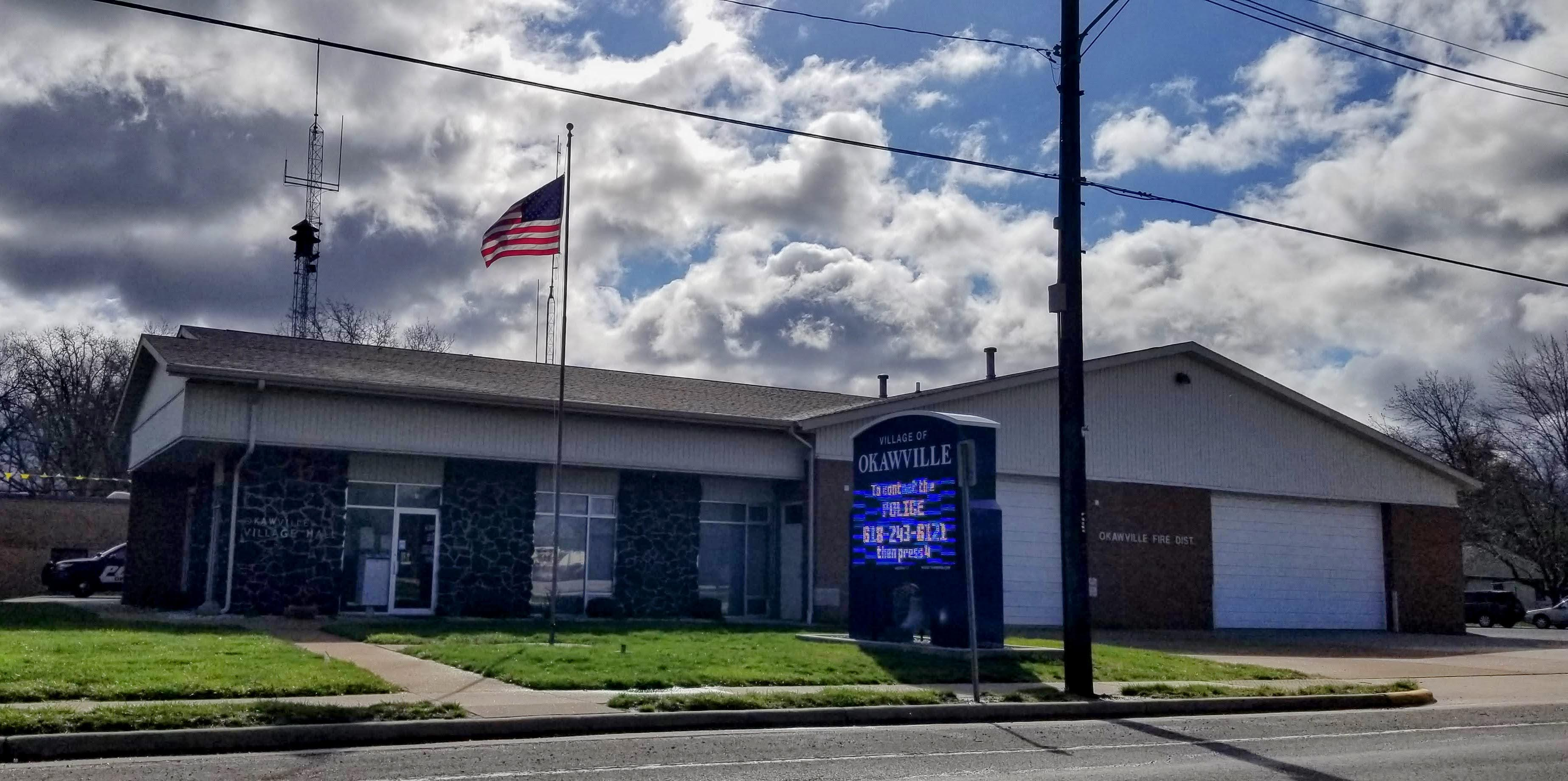
Okawville village hall

== Attractions ==
Okawville features Roland Barkau Memorial Golf Course, The American Legion Post 233, Rainbow Ranch, The Steam Pipe, and Heritage House Historic Sites and Museum. The Original Springs Hotel and Bathhouse, established in 1867, features a spring-fed spa with mineral waters.
