= Elkton, Illinois =

- Unincorporated community
- Location within Illinois Location within the United States
- Coordinates: 38°17′30″N 89°33′24″W
- Country: United States
- State: Illinois
- County: Washington
- Township: Oakdale
- Elevation: 499 ft (152 m)

Population
  - Total: About 50
- Time zone: UTC-6 (Central (CST))
  - Summer (DST): UTC-5 (CDT)
- Postal code: 62268
- Area code: 618
- GNIS feature ID: 407881

Elkton is an unincorporated community in Oakdale Township, Washington County, Illinois, United States. Elkton is 3.5 miles (5.6 km) northwest of Oakdale.
