= Original Springs Hotel and Bathhouse =

- U.S. National Register of Historic Places
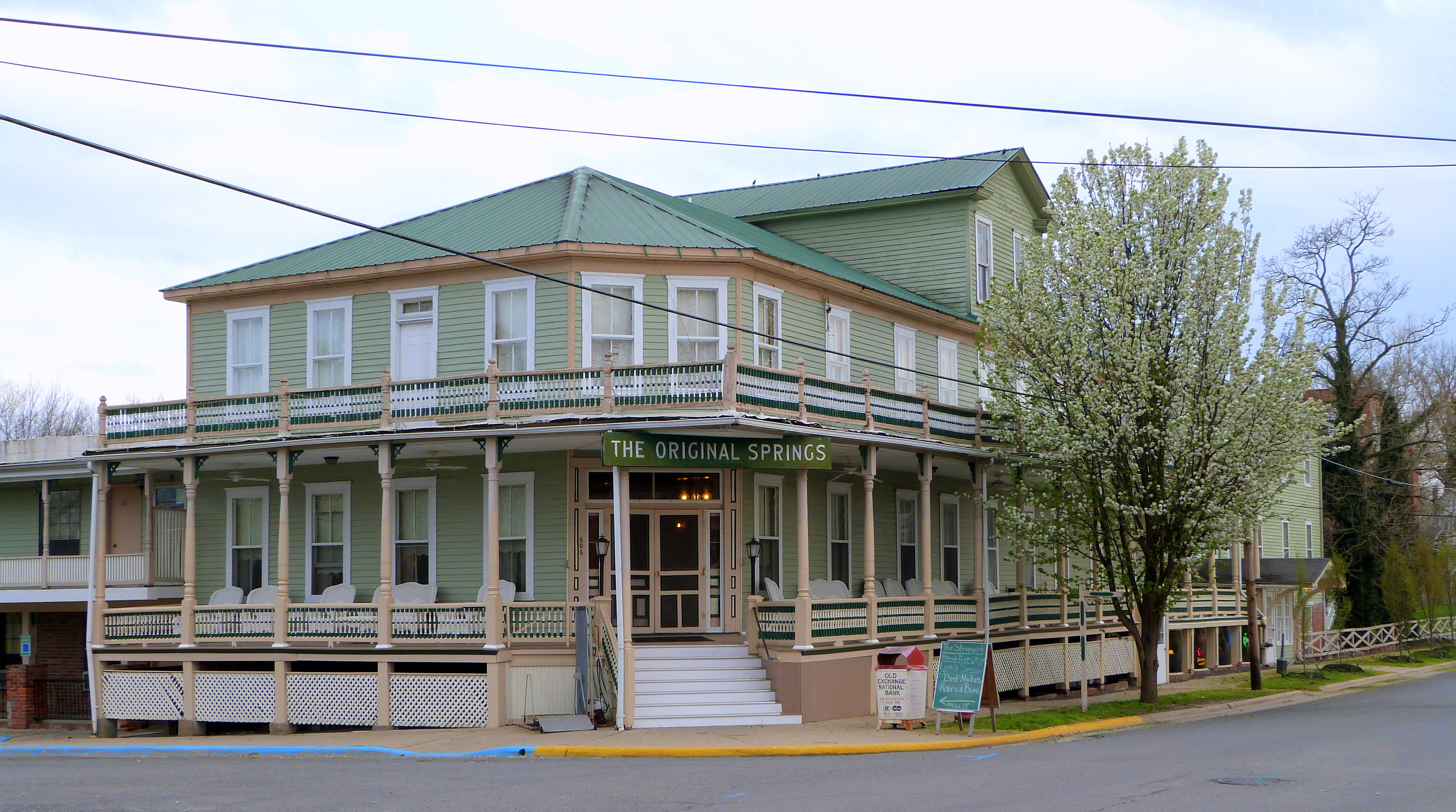

- Location within Illinois Location within the United States
- Location: 506 N. Hanover St., Okawville, Illinois
- Coordinates: 38°26′03″N 89°32′55″W
- Area: 1.5 acres (0.61 ha)
- Built: 1892
- NRHP reference No.: 78001194
- Added to NRHP: December 22, 1978

The Original Springs Hotel and Bathhouse is a mineral spa located at 506 N. Hanover St. in Okawville, Illinois. The resort was established in 1867, when founder Rudolph Plegge discovered the presence of minerals like magnesium and sulfur in his well water. Plegge and his neighbor C. H. Kelle built a bathhouse on his land; after the bathhouse burned in an 1892 fire, the current hotel and bathhouse were built. During the late 19th century, mineral spring resorts became popular due to their purported health benefits, and several new spas opened alongside the Original Springs in Okawville. The village became a significant resort destination for wealthy St. Louis businessmen, including brewing magnate August Anheuser Busch, Sr. While most of Okawville's resorts declined after mineral springs fell out of favor, the Original Springs was still a prominent resort as late as 1930. Though the spa declined during the Great Depression and the ensuing decades, it modernized in 1962 and remains open as a hotel and spa. It is now the only operational mineral spa remaining in Illinois.

The resort was added to the National Register of Historic Places on December 22, 1978.
