= Okawville Township, Washington County, Illinois =

Okawville Township
- Township

- Location of Illinois in the United States
- Coordinates: 38°26′14″N 89°32′01″W
- Country: United States
- State: Illinois
- County: Washington
- Settled: November 6, 1888

Area
  - Total: 36.35 sq mi (94.1 km^{2})
  - Land: 36.26 sq mi (93.9 km^{2})
  - Water: 0.09 sq mi (0.23 km^{2})
- Elevation: 443 ft (135 m)

Population (2010)
  - Estimate (2016): 1,924
  - Density: 54.9/sq mi (21.2/km^{2})
- Time zone: UTC-6 (CST)
  - Summer (DST): UTC-5 (CDT)
- FIPS code: 17-189-55483

Okawville Township is located in Washington County, Illinois. As of the 2010 census, its population was 1,987 and it contained 886 housing units.

== Geography ==
According to the 2010 census, the township has a total area of 36.35 square miles (94.1 km^{2}), of which 36.26 square miles (93.9 km^{2}) (or 99.75%) is land and 0.09 square miles (0.23 km^{2}) (or 0.25%) is water.

== Demographics ==
Historical population
Census	Pop.	Note	%±
2016 (est.)	1,924
U.S. Decennial Census
