= Wabash Valley Power Association =

Cooperative based in Indiana

- Company type: Utility cooperative (501(c)(12))
- Industry: electricity
- Founded: 1963
- Headquarters: Indianapolis, Indiana, United States
- Area served: Illinois, Indiana, and Missouri
- Products: electricity
- Website: wvpa.com

Wabash Valley Power Association is an electric generation and transmission cooperative headquartered in Indianapolis, Indiana. Wabash Valley provides wholesale power to 23 distribution cooperatives in Illinois, Indiana, and Missouri that reach over 311,000 businesses and residences. The cooperative operates under the business model of the National Rural Electric Cooperative Association.

Wabash Valley is a member of the PJM Interconnection and the Midcontinent Independent Transmission System Operator and a founding member of Touchstone Energy.

Wabash Valley's generating facilities make use of landfill gas generation, natural gas, coal, biogas, solar and wind power. Their program for members to purchase energy from renewable sources is monickered EnviroWatts. Co-op Solar is also available through participating distribution members. Through Wabash Valley Power's dist. In May 2009, Wabash Valley's Renewable Energy Certificate was certified by Green-e Energy.

Wabash Valley Power Association was founded in Peru, Indiana in 1963 by five distribution cooperatives. Their membership grew over the years and the headquarters were relocated to Indianapolis in 1976.

== Members ==
- Boone REMC
- Carroll White REMC
- Corn Belt Energy
- EnerStar Electric Cooperative
- Fulton County REMC
- Heartland REMC
- Hendricks Power Cooperative
- Jasper County REMC
- Jay County REMC
- Kankakee Valley REMC
- Kosciusko REMC
- LaGrange County REMC
- M.J.M. Electric Cooperative
- Marshall County REMC
- Miami-Cass REMC
- Newton County REMC
- NineStar Connect
- Noble REMC
- Parke County REMC
- Steuben County REMC
- Warren County REMC
