= Bolo Township, Washington County, Illinois =

Bolo Township
- Township

- Location of Illinois in the United States
- Coordinates: 38°15′32″N 89°19′01″W
- Country: United States
- State: Illinois
- County: Washington
- Settled: November 6, 1888

Area
  - Total: 37.32 sq mi (96.7 km^{2})
  - Land: 36.83 sq mi (95.4 km^{2})
  - Water: 0.48 sq mi (1.2 km^{2})
- Elevation: 469 ft (143 m)

Population (2010)
  - Estimate (2016): 407
  - Density: 11.4/sq mi (4.4/km^{2})
- Time zone: UTC-6 (CST)
  - Summer (DST): UTC-5 (CDT)
- FIPS code: 17-189-07172

Bolo Township is located in Washington County, Illinois, United States. As of the 2010 census, its population was 419 and it contained 173 housing units.

== Geography ==
According to the 2010 census, the township has a total area of 37.32 square miles (96.7 km^{2}), of which 36.83 square miles (95.4 km^{2}) (or 98.69%) is land and 0.48 square miles (1.2 km^{2}) (or 1.29%) is water.

== Demographics ==
Historical population
Census	Pop.	Note	%±
2016 (est.)	407
U.S. Decennial Census
