= Beaucoup, Illinois =

- Unincorporated community
- Location within Illinois Location within the United States
- Coordinates: 38°20′59″N 89°17′31″W
- Country: United States
- State: Illinois
- County: Washington
- Township: Beaucoup
- Elevation: 535 ft (163 m)
- Time zone: UTC-6 (Central (CST))
  - Summer (DST): UTC-5 (CDT)
- Area code: 618
- GNIS feature ID: 404044

Beaucoup is an unincorporated community in Beaucoup Township, Washington County, Illinois, United States. Beaucoup is located along the Evansville Western Railway near Illinois Route 15, 4.8 miles (7.7 km) east of Nashville. On October 12, 1948, Thomas E. Dewey gave a speech to a crowd of 1,000 during his presidential campaign.
