= Nashville Township, Washington County, Illinois =

Nashville Township
- Township

- Location of Illinois in the United States
- Coordinates: 38°20′50″N 89°25′28″W
- Country: United States
- State: Illinois
- County: Washington
- Settled: November 6, 1888

Area
  - Total: 34.78 sq mi (90.1 km^{2})
  - Land: 34.72 sq mi (89.9 km^{2})
  - Water: 0.06 sq mi (0.16 km^{2})
- Elevation: 489 ft (149 m)

Population (2010)
  - Estimate (2016): 3,516
  - Density: 105.9/sq mi (40.9/km^{2})
- Time zone: UTC-6 (CST)
  - Summer (DST): UTC-5 (CDT)
- FIPS code: 17-189-51713

Nashville Township is located in Washington County, Illinois. As of the 2010 census, its population was 3,676 and it contained 1,627 housing units.

== Geography ==
According to the 2010 census, the township has a total area of 34.78 square miles (90.1 km^{2}), of which 34.72 square miles (89.9 km^{2}) (or 99.83%) is land and 0.06 square miles (0.16 km^{2}) (or 0.17%) is water.

== Demographics ==
Historical population
Census	Pop.	Note	%±
2016 (est.)	3,516
U.S. Decennial Census

According to the 2010 United States census, there were 3,676 people living in Nashville. The population density was 40.81 inhabitants per square kilometer. Of the 3,676 residents, 97.14% were White, 0.57% were African American, 0.14% were Native American, 0.35% were Asian, 0.03% were Pacific Islander, 0.71% were from other races, and 1.06% were from two or more races. Hispanic or Latino residents of any race made up 1.5% of the population.
