= Plum Hill Township, Washington County, Illinois =

Plum Hill Township
- Township
- Location of Illinois in the United States
- Coordinates: 38°20′49″N 89°32′30″W
- Country: United States
- State: Illinois
- County: Washington
- Settled: November 6, 1888

Area
  - Total: 37.81 sq mi (97.9 km^{2})
  - Land: 37.8 sq mi (98 km^{2})
  - Water: 0.01 sq mi (0.026 km^{2})
- Elevation: 443 ft (135 m)

Population (2010)
  - Estimate (2016): 520
  - Density: 14.2/sq mi (5.5/km^{2})
- Time zone: UTC-6 (CST)
  - Summer (DST): UTC-5 (CDT)
- FIPS code: 17-189-60807

Plum Hill Township is located in Washington County, Illinois. As of the 2010 census, its population was 537 and it contained 229 housing units.

== Geography ==
According to the 2010 census, the township has a total area of 37.81 square miles (97.9 km^{2}), of which 37.8 square miles (98 km^{2}) (or 99.97%) is land and 0.01 square miles (0.026 km^{2}) (or 0.03%) is water.

== Demographics ==
Historical population
Census	Pop.	Note	%±
2016 (est.)	520
U.S. Decennial Census
