= Tilden, Illinois =

Tilden
- Village
- Location of Tilden in Randolph County, Illinois.
- Coordinates: 38°12′45″N 89°41′02″W
- Country: United States
- State: Illinois
- County: Randolph

Area
  - Total: 0.98 sq mi (2.55 km^{2})
  - Land: 0.97 sq mi (2.52 km^{2})
  - Water: 0.012 sq mi (0.03 km^{2})
- Elevation: 522 ft (159 m)

Population (2020)
  - Total: 750
  - Density: 769.4/sq mi (297.05/km^{2})
- Time zone: UTC-6 (CST)
  - Summer (DST): UTC-5 (CDT)
- ZIP code: 62292
- Area code: 618
- FIPS code: 17-75263
- GNIS feature ID: 2399981
- Website: villageoftilden.com

Tilden is a village in Randolph County, Illinois, United States. As of the 2020 census, the village had a population of 750.

== Geography ==
According to the 2010 census, Tilden has a total area of 0.981 square miles (2.54 km^{2}), of which 0.97 square miles (2.51 km^{2}) (or 98.88%) is land and 0.011 square miles (0.03 km^{2}) (or 1.12%) is water.

== Demographics ==
Historical population
Census	Pop.	Note	%±
1880	83		—
1910	774		—
1920	1,137		46.9%
1930	981		−13.7%
1940	1,040		6.0%
1950	906		−12.9%
1960	808		−10.8%
1970	909		12.5%
1980	1,025		12.8%
1990	919		−10.3%
2000	922		0.3%
2010	934		1.3%
2020	750		−19.7%
U.S. Decennial Census

As of the census of 2000, there were 922 people, 362 households, and 263 families residing in the village. The population density was 955.2 inhabitants per square mile (368.8/km^{2}). There were 394 housing units at an average density of 408.2 units per square mile (157.6 units/km^{2}). The racial makeup of the village was 99.13% White, 0.11% Native American, and 0.76% from two or more races. Hispanic or Latino of any race were 1.52% of the population.

There were 362 households, out of which 34.0% had children under the age of 18 living with them, 53.3% were married couples living together, 12.2% had a female householder with no husband present, and 27.3% were non-families. 23.2% of all households were made up of individuals, and 11.0% had someone living alone who was 65 years of age or older. The average household size was 2.55 and the average family size was 2.96.

In the village, the population was spread out, with 25.4% under the age of 18, 10.8% from 18 to 24, 26.8% from 25 to 44, 22.5% from 45 to 64, and 14.5% who were 65 years of age or older. The median age was 36 years. For every 100 females, there were 100.4 males. For every 100 females age 18 and over, there were 92.7 males.

The median income for a household in the village was $34,115, and the median income for a family was $37,500. Males had a median income of $28,125 versus $19,688 for females. The per capita income for the village was $14,738. About 12.4% of families and 14.7% of the population were below the poverty line, including 16.3% of those under age 18 and 8.7% of those age 65 or over.
