= UDP-4-amino-4,6-dideoxy-N-acetyl-beta-L-altrosamine transaminase =

Identifiers
- EC no.: 2.6.1.92

Databases
- IntEnz: IntEnz view
- BRENDA: BRENDA entry
- ExPASy: NiceZyme view
- KEGG: KEGG entry
- MetaCyc: metabolic pathway
- PRIAM: profile
- PDB structures: RCSB PDB PDBe PDBsum
Search
- PMC: articles
- PubMed: articles
- NCBI: proteins

UDP-4-amino-4,6-dideoxy-N-acetyl-beta-L-altrosamine transaminase (EC 2.6.1.92, PseC) is an enzyme with systematic name UDP-4-amino-4,6-dideoxy-N-acetyl-beta-L-altrosamine:2-oxoglutarate aminotransferase. This enzyme catalyses the following chemical reaction

UDP-4-amino-4,6-dideoxy-N-acetyl-beta-L-altrosamine + 2-oxoglutarate $\rightleftharpoons$ UDP-2-acetamido-2,6-dideoxy-beta-L-arabino-hex-4-ulose + L-glutamate

This enzyme is a pyridoxal-phosphate protein.
