= Lively massacre =

American massacre

- Location: Washington County, Illinois
- Date: 1813
- Attack type: Mass murder
- Deaths: 5 graves are marked with crude stones, at the massacre site

The Lively massacre occurred in 1813, when a group of Native Americans killed John Lively, his wife, Mary Jane, and most of their children in an area now known as Washington County, Illinois. Reported survivors included an eight-year-old daughter who was staying with another family during the time of the attack and possibly a son who may have been away on a hunting trip or out herding cattle.

== See also ==
- List of homicides in Illinois
