= Pilot Knob Township, Washington County, Illinois =

Pilot Knob Township
- Township

- Location of Illinois in the United States
- Coordinates: 38°15′51″N 89°25′42″W
- Country: United States
- State: Illinois
- County: Washington
- Settled: November 6, 1888

Area
  - Total: 35.32 sq mi (91.5 km^{2})
  - Land: 35.23 sq mi (91.2 km^{2})
  - Water: 0.09 sq mi (0.23 km^{2})
- Elevation: 515 ft (157 m)

Population (2010)
  - Estimate (2016): 538
  - Density: 15.8/sq mi (6.1/km^{2})
- Time zone: UTC-6 (CST)
  - Summer (DST): UTC-5 (CDT)
- FIPS code: 17-189-59858

Pilot Knob Township is located in Washington County, Illinois. As of the 2010 census, its population was 555 and it contained 221 housing units.

== Geography ==
According to the 2010 census, the township has a total area of 35.32 square miles (91.5 km^{2}), of which 35.23 square miles (91.2 km^{2}) (or 99.75%) is land and 0.09 square miles (0.23 km^{2}) (or 0.25%) is water.

== Demographics ==
Historical population
Census	Pop.	Note	%±
2016 (est.)	538
U.S. Decennial Census
