= Oakdale Township, Washington County, Illinois =

Oakdale Township
- Township
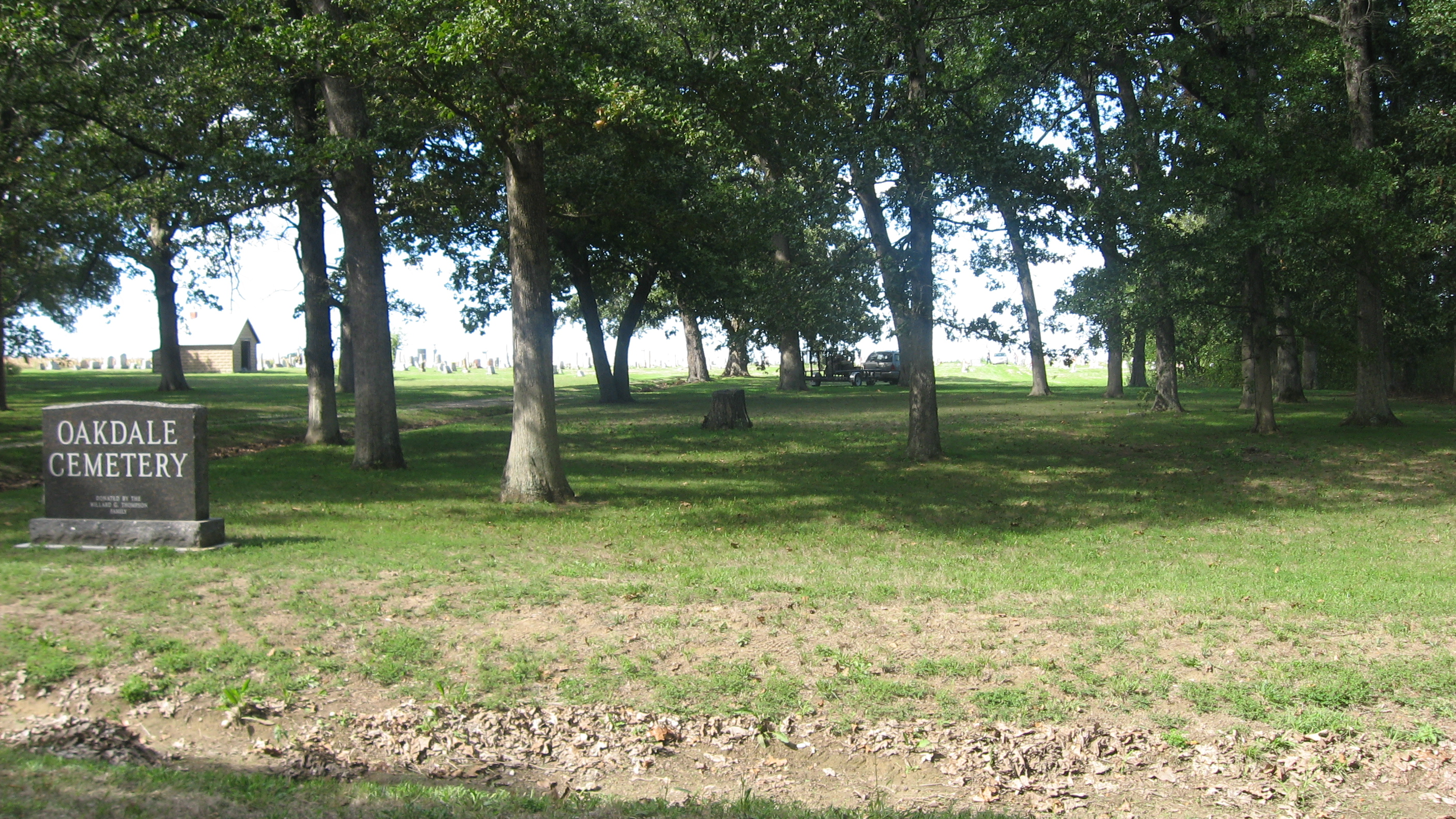
- Oakdale Cemetery

- Location of Illinois in the United States
- Coordinates: 38°15′55″N 89°32′02″W
- Country: United States
- State: Illinois
- County: Washington
- Settled: November 6, 1888

Area
  - Total: 37.45 sq mi (97.0 km^{2})
  - Land: 37.39 sq mi (96.8 km^{2})
  - Water: 0.06 sq mi (0.16 km^{2})
- Elevation: 551 ft (168 m)

Population (2010)
  - Estimate (2016): 574
  - Density: 15.9/sq mi (6.1/km^{2})
- Time zone: UTC-6 (CST)
  - Summer (DST): UTC-5 (CDT)
- FIPS code: 17-189-54599

Oakdale Township is located in Washington County, Illinois. As of the 2010 census, its population was 594 and it contained 253 housing units. Oakdale has a public school called Oakdale Grade School.

== Geography ==
According to the 2010 census, the township has a total area of 37.45 square miles (97.0 km^{2}), of which 37.39 square miles (96.8 km^{2}) (or 99.84%) is land and 0.06 square miles (0.16 km^{2}) (or 0.16%) is water.

== Demographics ==
Historical population
Census	Pop.	Note	%±
2016 (est.)	574
U.S. Decennial Census
