= NineStar Connect =

American utility company

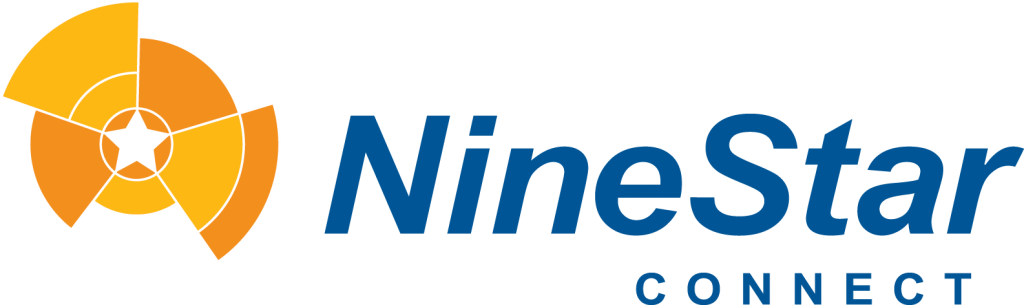
- Founded: 1895
- Headquarters: Greenfield, Indiana
- Number of locations: Four: Greenfield, Maxwell, McCordsville, Knightstown
- Key people: Michael R. Burrow, President & CEO
- Products: Electricity, Voice, Internet, IP Television, Security, Water & Sewer
- Revenue: $65,045,297 (2018)
- Total assets: $28,686,167 (2018)
- Divisions: Communications Electric Water & Sewer
- Website: www.ninestarconnect.com

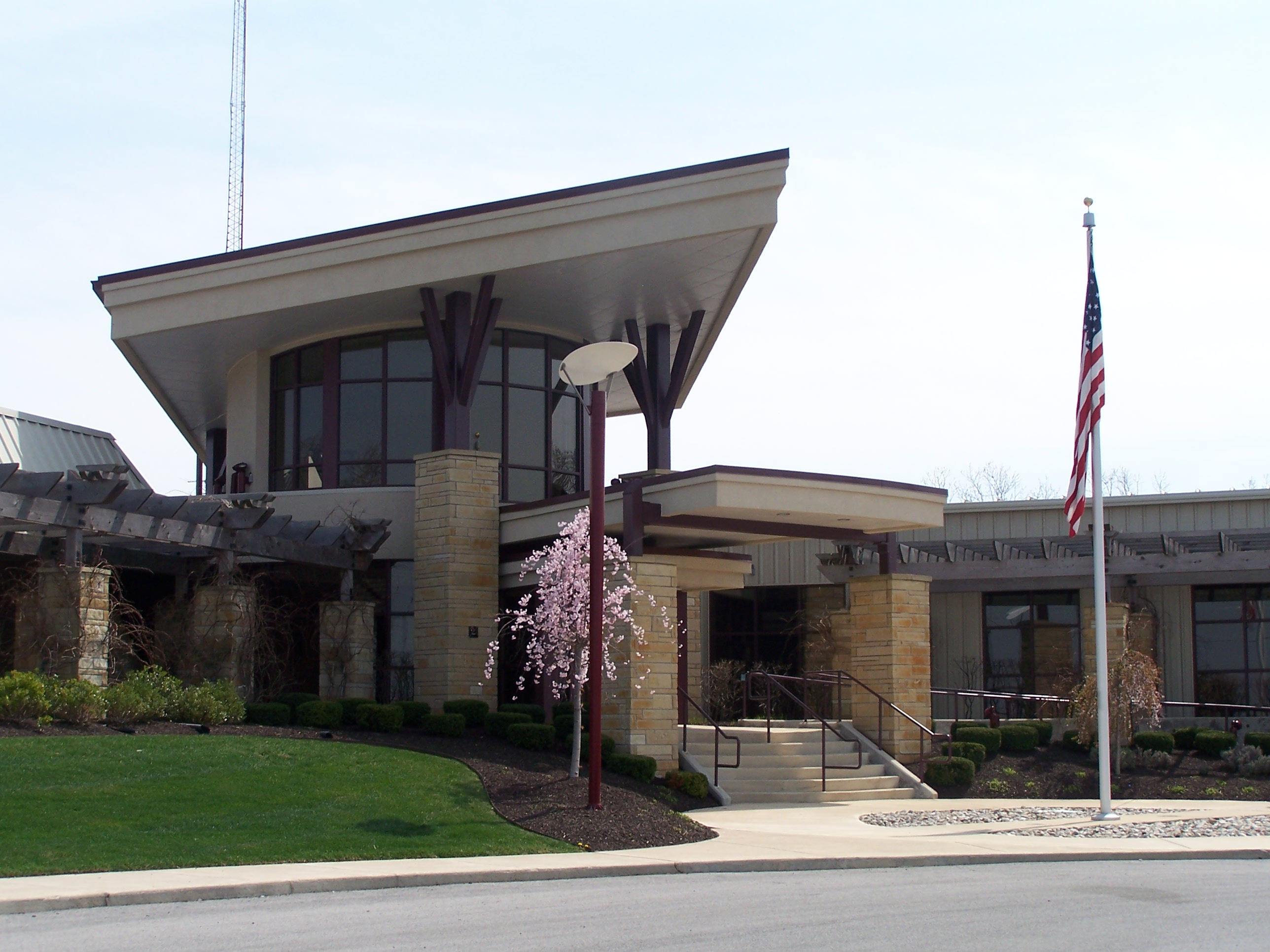
NineStar Connect corporate headquarters located in Greenfield, Indiana.

NineStar Connect is an American smart utility cooperative. It is headquartered in Greenfield, Indiana, with assets in Central Indiana. The company offers communication, electricity, water and sewer utility services.

== History ==
NineStar Connect actually traces in origins back to the McCordsville Telephone Company which was founded in 1895 by Loren Helms. Helms, a telephone factory worker, strung a wire across a back fence from his mother's house to the home of his sister, Mrs. Charles Peal, and installed the first telephone in the community. Soon three neighbors joined the line Hiram Dunham, James Thomas, and Robert Wilson – and the company was in business. It became a cooperative in 1950 once merged with Maxwell, Mohawk, New Eden and Willow Branch Telephone companies. Central Indiana Power was incorporated in 1936 as Hancock County Rural Electric Membership Cooperative to offer electricity to what used to be rural portions of the county. These two local cooperatives officially merged on January 1, 2011.

The name NineStar Connect is the result of the newly merged cooperative that was previously known as separate entities, Hancock Telecom and Central Indiana Power. On February 9, 2011, then-NineStar President and CEO Tim Hills stated, "A lot of time, research and discussion went into the selection of the new name. We wanted an innovative name yet we wanted to keep some of the heritage of the two great cooperatives." More than 800 customers and employees gave their input, with majority supporting the new name. The significance of the word "Nine" is that nine separate companies have been consolidated since 1950 to form what is now the new merge. "Star" references light, which is key in fiber-optics and digital technologies, and also serves as a subtle reminder that electricity provides light. "Connect" describes how the cooperative brings together electricity and communications in a single service package.

In 2016, NineStar grew their utility service offerings by expanding into water and sewer services. The utility received approval from Hancock County officials and were granted nearly 45,000 acres of rural area as a new water territory. In addition, within that territory NineStar acquired assets to the Sugar Creek Utilities and Philadelphia Water Works. In January 2019, the company added to their water division by acquiring the Gem Water Utility from the town of Cumberland. The transaction was for $4 million and included over 500 customers.

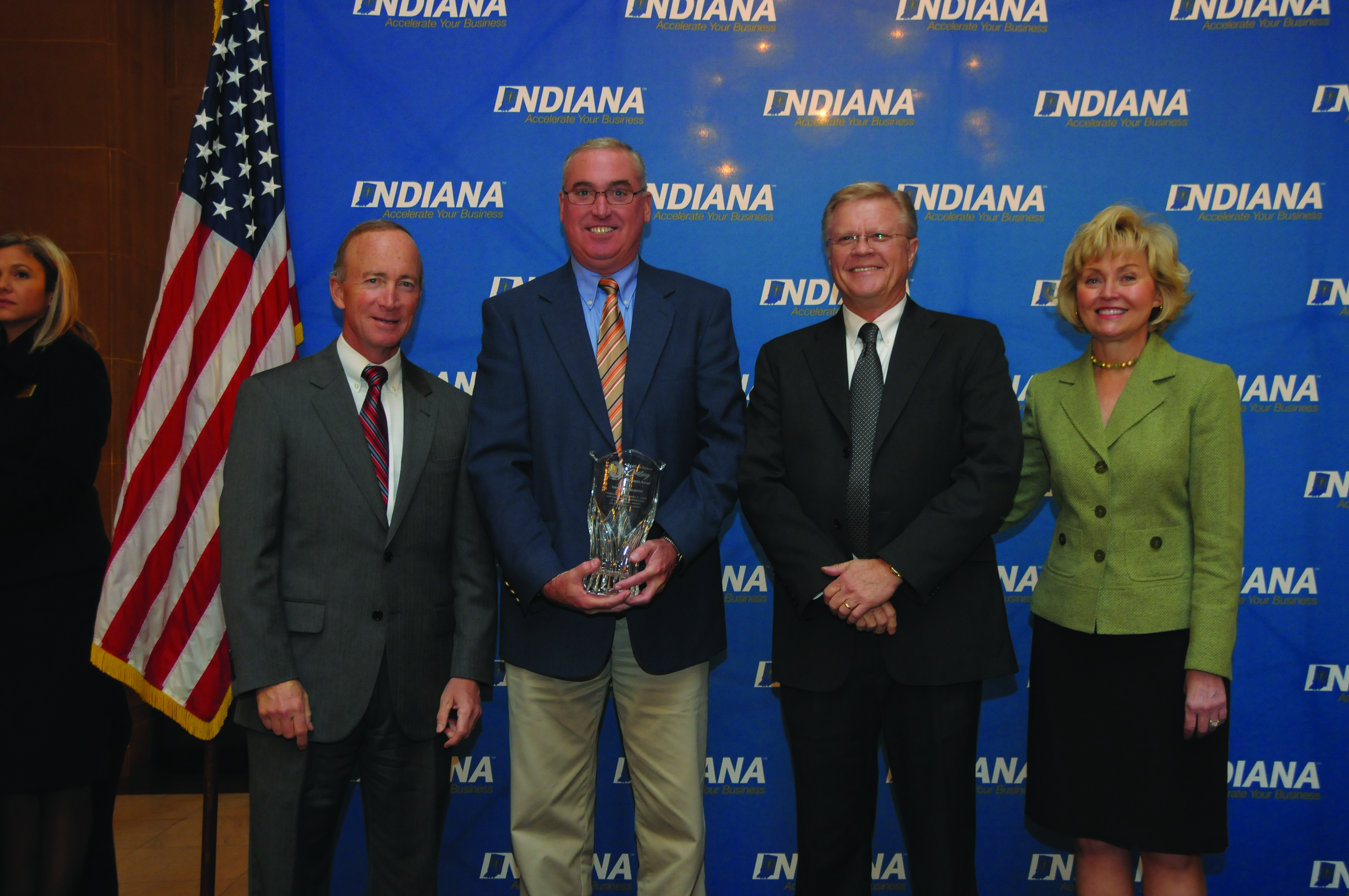
Indiana Governor Mitchell Daniels Jr. presents the Century Award to representatives from Hancock Telecom. Lieutenant Governor Rebecca Skillman is also in the photo.

== Assets and revenues ==
NineStar Connect's Annual Report for 2018 states the Total Current Assets and Total Operating Revenues. Respectively they are $28,686,167 and $65,045,297.
