= Beaucoup Township, Washington County, Illinois =

Beaucoup Township
- Township

- Location of Illinois in the United States
- Coordinates: 38°20′46″N 89°19′01″W
- Country: United States
- State: Illinois
- County: Washington
- Settled: November 6, 1888

Area
  - Total: 37.97 sq mi (98.3 km^{2})
  - Land: 37.84 sq mi (98.0 km^{2})
  - Water: 0.13 sq mi (0.34 km^{2})
- Elevation: 571 ft (174 m)

Population (2010)
  - Estimate (2016): 576
  - Density: 15.7/sq mi (6.1/km^{2})
- Time zone: UTC-6 (CST)
  - Summer (DST): UTC-5 (CDT)
- FIPS code: 17-189-04442

Beaucoup Township is located in Washington County, Illinois. As of the 2010 census, its population was 593 and it contained 238 housing units.

== Geography ==
According to the 2010 census, the township has a total area of 37.97 square miles (98.3 km^{2}), of which 37.84 square miles (98.0 km^{2}) (or 99.66%) is land and 0.13 square miles (0.34 km^{2}) (or 0.34%) is water.

== Demographics ==
Historical population
Census	Pop.	Note	%±
2016 (est.)	576
U.S. Decennial Census
