= Johannisburg Township, Washington County, Illinois =

Johannisburg Township
- Township

- Location of Illinois in the United States
- Coordinates: 38°20′48″N 89°39′29″W
- Country: United States
- State: Illinois
- County: Washington
- Settled: November 6, 1888

Area
  - Total: 36.05 sq mi (93.4 km^{2})
  - Land: 36.05 sq mi (93.4 km^{2})
  - Water: 0 sq mi (0 km^{2})
- Elevation: 433 ft (132 m)

Population (2020)
  - Total: 500
  - Estimate (2016): 497
  - Density: 14.2/sq mi (5.5/km^{2})
- Time zone: UTC-6 (CST)
  - Summer (DST): UTC-5 (CDT)
- FIPS code: 17-189-38453

Johannisburg Township is located in Washington County, Illinois. As of the 2010 census, its population was 511 and it contained 227 housing units.

== Geography ==
According to the 2010 census, the township has a total area of 36.05 square miles (93.4 km^{2}), all land.

== Demographics ==
Historical population
Census	Pop.	Note	%±
2020	500		—
U.S. Decennial Census
