= Lively Grove Township, Washington County, Illinois =

Lively Grove Township
- Township

- Location of Illinois in the United States
- Coordinates: 38°15′49″N 89°39′14″W
- Country: United States
- State: Illinois
- County: Washington
- Settled: 1889

Area
  - Total: 35.96 sq mi (93.1 km^{2})
  - Land: 35.92 sq mi (93.0 km^{2})
  - Water: 0.04 sq mi (0.10 km^{2})
- Elevation: 443 ft (135 m)

Population (2010)
  - Estimate (2016): 669
  - Density: 19.1/sq mi (7.4/km^{2})
- Time zone: UTC-6 (CST)
  - Summer (DST): UTC-5 (CDT)
- FIPS code: 17-189-44108

Lively Grove Township is a township in Washington County, Illinois. As of the 2010 census, its population was 688, and it contained 294 housing units.

The township is home to the Prairie State Energy Campus.

== Geography ==
According to the 2010 census, the township has a total area of 35.96 square miles (93.1 km^{2}), of which 35.92 square miles (93.0 km^{2}) (or 99.89%) is land and 0.04 square miles (0.10 km^{2}) (or 0.11%) is water.

== Demographics ==
Historical population
Census	Pop.	Note	%±
2016 (est.)	669
U.S. Decennial Census
