= Washington County, Illinois =

County in Illinois, United States

- County
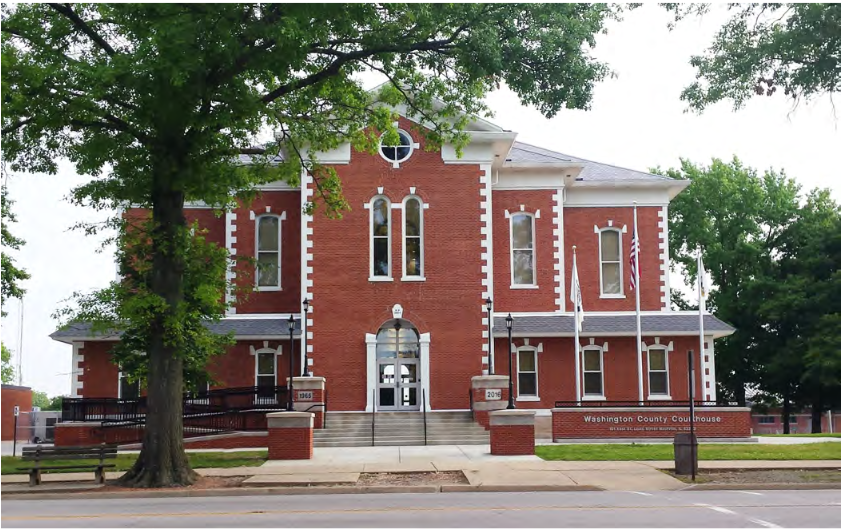
- Washington County Courthouse in Nashville

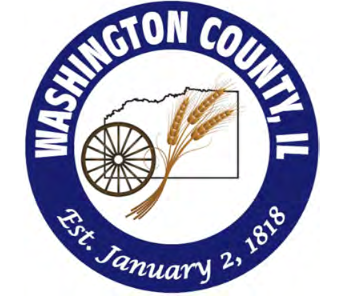
- Seal

- Location within the U.S. state of Illinois
- Coordinates: 38°21′N 89°25′W
- Country: United States
- State: Illinois
- Founded: January 2, 1818
- Named for: George Washington
- Seat: Nashville
- Largest city: Nashville

Area
  - Total: 564 sq mi (1,460 km^{2})
  - Land: 563 sq mi (1,460 km^{2})
  - Water: 1.3 sq mi (3.4 km^{2}) 0.2%

Population (2020)
  - Total: 13,761
  - Estimate (2025): 13,564 ▼
  - Density: 24.4/sq mi (9.44/km^{2})
- Time zone: UTC−6 (Central)
  - Summer (DST): UTC−5 (CDT)
- Congressional district: 12th
- Website: www.washingtonco.illinois.gov

Washington County is a county located in the U.S. state of Illinois. As of the 2020 census, it had a population of 13,761. Its county seat is Nashville. It is located in the southern portion of Illinois known locally as "Little Egypt".

== History ==
Washington County was formed on January 2, 1818, out of St. Clair County. It was named for George Washington. Despite its relative proximity to the Illinois suburbs of St. Louis, Missouri, the county is not considered part of the St. Louis metropolitan area, also known as the Metro-East. In 1813, the Lively Massacre occurred near Little Crooked Creek. In 1959, the state established the Washington County State Recreation Area. Washington County was initially settled by immigrants from Kentucky who moved northward out of that state in the early 1800s. In the late 1800s there were (relatively) large numbers of immigrants who settled in Washington County, and by the early 1900s there were large numbers of first-generation immigrants still living in Washington County. They primarily came from the four countries of Germany, Poland, Ireland and England.

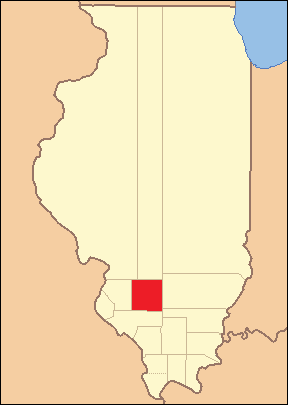
Washington County from its 1818 creation to 1824

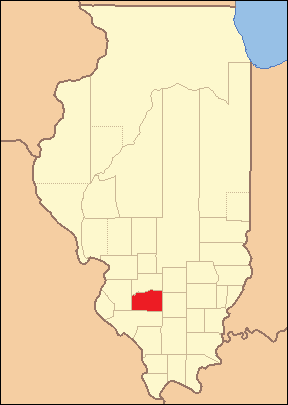
Washington County in 1824, reduced to its current borders by the creation of Clinton County

== Geography ==
According to the U.S. Census Bureau, the county has a total area of 564 square miles (1,460 km^{2}), of which 563 square miles (1,460 km^{2}) is land and 1.3 square miles (3.4 km^{2}) (0.2%) is water. There are many lakes, rivers, streams, and creeks in this area, including the Kaskaskia River, which is the county's northern border.

=== Climate and weather ===
Nashville, Illinois

Climate chart (precipitation, max. and min. temperature)
J	F	M	A	M	J	J	A	S	O	N	D
2.2 38 22	2.3 44 27	3.5 56 35	3.9 67 45	4.1 76 55	3.7 85 64	3.7 88 68	2.7 87 65	3.2 80 58	3 69 47	3.8 54 37	3 42 26
- █ Average max. and min. temperatures in °F
- █ Precipitation totals in inches
- Source: The Weather Channel
Metric conversion
J	F	M	A	M	J	J	A	S	O	N	D
55 3 −6	59 7 −3	88 13 2	98 19 7	104 24 13	93 29 18	93 31 20	69 31 18	82 27 14	76 21 8	96 12 3	76 6 −3
- █ Average max. and min. temperatures in °C
- █ Precipitation totals in mm

In recent years, average temperatures in Nashville have ranged from a low of 22 °F (−6 °C) in January to a high of 88 °F (31 °C) in July, although a record low of −21 °F (−29 °C) was recorded in December 1989 and a record high of 106 °F (41 °C) was recorded in July 1980. Average monthly precipitation ranged from 2.18 inches (55 mm) in January to 4.10 inches (104 mm) in May. On November 17, 2013, an EF4 tornado swept through the area, destroying homes and causing two fatalities.

=== Public transit ===
- South Central Transit

=== Major highways ===
- I-64
- US 51
- IL 4
- IL 13
- IL 15 – former US 460
- IL 127
- IL 153
- IL 157
- IL 160
- IL 177

=== Adjacent counties ===
- Clinton County (north)
- Marion County (northeast)
- Jefferson County (east)
- Perry County (south)
- Randolph County (southwest)
- St. Clair County (west)

== Demographics ==
Historical population
Census	Pop.	Note	%±
1820	1,517		—
1830	1,675		10.4%
1840	4,810		187.2%
1850	6,953		44.6%
1860	13,731		97.5%
1870	17,599		28.2%
1880	21,112		20.0%
1890	19,262		−8.8%
1900	19,526		1.4%
1910	18,759		−3.9%
1920	18,035		−3.9%
1930	16,286		−9.7%
1940	15,801		−3.0%
1950	14,460		−8.5%
1960	13,569		−6.2%
1970	13,780		1.6%
1980	15,472		12.3%
1990	14,965		−3.3%
2000	15,148		1.2%
2010	14,716		−2.9%
2020	13,761		−6.5%
2025 (est.)	13,564	▼	−1.4%
U.S. Decennial Census; 1790-1960 1900-1990; 1990-2000 2010

=== 2020 census ===
As of the 2020 census, the county had a population of 13,761. The median age was 44.4 years. 21.3% of residents were under the age of 18 and 21.1% of residents were 65 years of age or older. For every 100 females there were 100.6 males, and for every 100 females age 18 and over there were 100.7 males age 18 and over.

The racial makeup of the county was 94.7% White, 0.7% Black or African American, 0.2% American Indian and Alaska Native, 0.5% Asian, 0.1% Native Hawaiian and Pacific Islander, 0.5% from some other race, and 3.2% from two or more races. Hispanic or Latino residents of any race comprised 1.6% of the population.

0.7% of residents lived in urban areas, while 99.3% lived in rural areas.

There were 5,723 households in the county, of which 27.8% had children under the age of 18 living in them. Of all households, 54.2% were married-couple households, 18.4% were households with a male householder and no spouse or partner present, and 20.8% were households with a female householder and no spouse or partner present. About 28.0% of all households were made up of individuals and 13.8% had someone living alone who was 65 years of age or older.

There were 6,390 housing units, of which 10.4% were vacant. Among occupied housing units, 80.5% were owner-occupied and 19.5% were renter-occupied. The homeowner vacancy rate was 1.2% and the rental vacancy rate was 7.4%.

=== Racial and ethnic composition ===
Washington County, Illinois – Racial and ethnic composition Note: the US Census treats Hispanic/Latino as an ethnic category. This table excludes Latinos from the racial categories and assigns them to a separate category. Hispanics/Latinos may be of any race.
Race / Ethnicity (NH = Non-Hispanic)	Pop 1980	Pop 1990	Pop 2000	Pop 2010	Pop 2020	% 1980	% 1990	% 2000	% 2010	% 2020
White alone (NH)	15,299	14,816	14,846	14,260	12,976	98.88%	99.00%	98.01%	96.90%	94.30%
Black or African American alone (NH)	38	46	49	94	85	0.25%	0.31%	0.32%	0.64%	0.62%
Native American or Alaska Native alone (NH)	23	31	33	13	25	0.15%	0.21%	0.22%	0.09%	0.18%
Asian alone (NH)	19	23	27	41	65	0.12%	0.15%	0.18%	0.28%	0.47%
Native Hawaiian or Pacific Islander alone (NH)	x	x	4	4	20	x	x	0.03%	0.03%	0.15%
Other race alone (NH)	26	1	6	3	15	0.17%	0.01%	0.04%	0.02%	0.11%
Mixed race or Multiracial (NH)	x	x	75	104	351	x	x	0.50%	0.71%	2.55%
Hispanic or Latino (any race)	67	48	108	197	224	0.43%	0.32%	0.71%	1.34%	1.63%
Total	15,472	14,965	15,148	14,716	13,761	100.00%	100.00%	100.00%	100.00%	100.00%

=== 2010 census ===
As of the 2010 United States census, there were 14,716 people, 5,926 households, and 4,112 families residing in the county. The population density was 26.2 inhabitants per square mile (10.1/km^{2}). There were 6,534 housing units at an average density of 11.6 per square mile (4.5/km^{2}). The racial makeup of the county was 97.7% white, 0.7% black or African American, 0.3% Asian, 0.1% American Indian, 0.4% from other races, and 0.8% from two or more races. Those of Hispanic or Latino origin made up 1.3% of the population. In terms of ancestry, 53.6% were German, 14.0% were Polish, 13.1% were Irish, 7.7% were English, and 6.1% were American.

Of the 5,926 households, 30.1% had children under the age of 18 living with them, 57.6% were married couples living together, 7.3% had a female householder with no husband present, 30.6% were non-families, and 25.9% of all households were made up of individuals. The average household size was 2.44 and the average family size was 2.93. The median age was 42.3 years.

The median income for a household in the county was $51,440 and the median income for a family was $64,171. Males had a median income of $44,272 versus $30,683 for females. The per capita income for the county was $24,846. About 5.5% of families and 9.1% of the population were below the poverty line, including 13.2% of those under age 18 and 8.9% of those age 65 or over.

== Education ==
The county is served by six school districts:

- Oakdale CCSD 1
- West Washington County CUD 10
- Irvington CCSD 11
- Ashley CCSD 15
- Nashville CCSD 49
- Nashville Community High School District 99

== Communities ==
=== Cities ===
- Ashley
- Centralia
- Nashville

=== Villages ===
- Addieville
- Du Bois
- Hoyleton
- Irvington
- New Minden
- Oakdale
- Okawville
- Radom
- Richview
- Venedy

=== Unincorporated communities ===
- Beaucoup
- Clarmin
- Cordes
- Elkton
- Huegely
- Lively Grove
- Plum Hill
- Posen
- Pyramid
- Stone Church

=== Townships ===
Washington County is divided into these townships:

- Ashley
- Beaucoup
- Bolo
- Covington
- DuBois
- Hoyleton
- Irvington
- Johannisburg
- Lively Grove
- Nashville
- Oakdale
- Okawville
- Pilot Knob
- Plum Hill
- Richview
- Venedy

== Politics ==
Washington is a rural conservative county in Southern Illinois that has always trended Republican in presidential elections. The only Democrat to win a majority of the county's ballots since the Civil War was Franklin D. Roosevelt in his 1932 landslide. Historically, the county was dominated by organized labor and family farms. The area tends to be economically and socially conservative.

United States presidential election results for Washington County, Illinois
Year	Republican		Democratic		Third party(ies)	
Year	No.	%	No.	%	No.	%
1892	1,956	47.35%	1,868	45.22%	307	7.43%
1896	2,351	53.30%	1,979	44.87%	81	1.84%
1900	2,351	51.81%	2,081	45.86%	106	2.34%
1904	2,374	57.30%	1,504	36.30%	265	6.40%
1908	2,355	53.87%	1,830	41.86%	187	4.28%
1912	1,058	24.99%	1,654	39.06%	1,522	35.95%
1916	4,657	60.95%	2,794	36.57%	190	2.49%
1920	4,519	70.76%	1,102	17.26%	765	11.98%
1924	3,444	56.43%	1,717	28.13%	942	15.44%
1928	3,638	55.90%	2,848	43.76%	22	0.34%
1932	3,076	38.81%	4,696	59.25%	154	1.94%
1936	4,540	51.20%	4,119	46.45%	209	2.36%
1940	5,701	61.82%	3,479	37.73%	42	0.46%
1944	5,428	66.31%	2,723	33.26%	35	0.43%
1948	4,544	61.99%	2,737	37.34%	49	0.67%
1952	5,546	66.17%	2,824	33.70%	11	0.13%
1956	5,299	65.14%	2,820	34.67%	16	0.20%
1960	5,053	61.95%	3,093	37.92%	11	0.13%
1964	3,840	51.13%	3,670	48.87%	0	0.00%
1968	4,793	63.32%	2,093	27.65%	683	9.02%
1972	5,179	68.85%	2,327	30.94%	16	0.21%
1976	4,485	57.18%	3,222	41.08%	137	1.75%
1980	5,354	68.98%	2,158	27.80%	250	3.22%
1984	5,129	68.24%	2,363	31.44%	24	0.32%
1988	4,127	60.04%	2,689	39.12%	58	0.84%
1992	3,003	39.75%	2,986	39.52%	1,566	20.73%
1996	3,339	48.20%	2,744	39.61%	844	12.18%
2000	4,353	60.98%	2,638	36.96%	147	2.06%
2004	5,072	62.59%	2,986	36.85%	46	0.57%
2008	4,473	56.39%	3,342	42.13%	117	1.48%
2012	4,792	64.45%	2,450	32.95%	193	2.60%
2016	5,571	74.90%	1,448	19.47%	419	5.63%
2020	6,115	77.20%	1,641	20.72%	165	2.08%
2024	5,892	77.56%	1,564	20.59%	141	1.86%

== Media ==
WNSV in Nashville is the only radio station in the county.

The two weekly newspapers in the county are The Nashville News, located in Nashville, and The Okawville Times, which is based in Okawville.

== See also ==
- Lively massacre
- National Register of Historic Places listings in Washington County
