= Ashley Township, Illinois =

Ashley Township
- Township
- Location in Washington County

- Location of Ashley Township in Illinois
- Coordinates: 38°19′54″N 89°12′07″W
- Country: United States
- State: Illinois
- County: Washington
- Settled: November 6, 1888

Area
  - Total: 24.44 sq mi (63.3 km^{2})
  - Land: 24.42 sq mi (63.2 km^{2})
  - Water: 0.02 sq mi (0.052 km^{2})
- Elevation: 541 ft (165 m)

Population (2010)
  - Estimate (2016): 771
- Time zone: UTC-6 (CST)
  - Summer (DST): UTC-5 (CDT)
- FIPS code: 17-189-02544

Ashley Township is a township located in Washington County, Illinois, United States. As of the 2010 census, its population was 816 and it contained 404 housing units.

== Geography ==
According to the 2010 census, the township has a total area of 24.44 square miles (63.3 km^{2}), of which 24.42 square miles (63.2 km^{2}) (or 99.92%) is land and 0.02 square miles (0.052 km^{2}) (or 0.08%) is water.

=== Major highways ===
- I-64
- US 51
- CR 23

== Demographics ==
Historical population
Census	Pop.	Note	%±
2016 (est.)	771
U.S. Decennial Census
