= Hoyleton, Illinois =

Hoyleton
- Village
- Location of Hoyleton in Washington County, Illinois.
- Coordinates: 38°26′45″N 89°16′20″W
- Country: United States
- State: Illinois
- County: Washington

Area
  - Total: 0.76 sq mi (1.97 km^{2})
  - Land: 0.76 sq mi (1.97 km^{2})
  - Water: 0 sq mi (0.00 km^{2})
- Elevation: 528 ft (161 m)

Population (2020)
  - Total: 520
  - Density: 684.3/sq mi (264.22/km^{2})
- Time zone: UTC-6 (CST)
  - Summer (DST): UTC-5 (CDT)
- ZIP code: 62803
- Area code: 618
- FIPS code: 17-36347
- GNIS ID: 2398550

Hoyleton is a village in Washington County, Illinois, United States. As of the 2020 census, Hoyleton had a population of 520.

== Geography ==
According to the 2010 census, Hoyleton has a total area of 0.75 square miles (1.94 km^{2}), all land.

== Demographics ==
Historical population
Census	Pop.	Note	%±
1880	312		—
1890	351		12.5%
1900	352		0.3%
1910	451		28.1%
1920	527		16.9%
1930	380		−27.9%
1940	401		5.5%
1950	462		15.2%
1960	475		2.8%
1970	457		−3.8%
1980	542		18.6%
1990	508		−6.3%
2000	520		2.4%
2010	531		2.1%
2020	520		−2.1%
U.S. Decennial Census

As of the census of 2000, there were 520 people, 186 households, and 130 families residing in the village. The population density was 692.9 inhabitants per square mile (267.5/km^{2}). There were 200 housing units at an average density of 266.5 per square mile (102.9/km^{2}). The racial makeup of the village was 94.81% White, 3.85% African American, 0.38% Asian, and 0.96% from two or more races. Hispanic or Latino of any race were 0.38% of the population.

There were 186 households, out of which 32.8% had children under the age of 18 living with them, 59.1% were married couples living together, 5.9% had a female householder with no husband present, and 29.6% were non-families. 26.9% of all households were made up of individuals, and 13.4% had someone living alone who was 65 years of age or older. The average household size was 2.47 and the average family size was 2.99.

In the village, the population was spread out, with 27.9% under the age of 18, 9.2% from 18 to 24, 25.4% from 25 to 44, 19.8% from 45 to 64, and 17.7% who were 65 years of age or older. The median age was 34 years. For every 100 females, there were 100.0 males. For every 100 females age 18 and over, there were 89.4 males.

The median income for a household in the village was $43,250, and the median income for a family was $50,357. Males had a median income of $35,000 versus $18,558 for females. The per capita income for the village was $16,543. About 2.5% of families and 6.5% of the population were below the poverty line, including 6.6% of those under age 18 and 4.3% of those age 65 or over.

== Notable person ==
- Kirk Rueter: pitcher for Montreal Expos and San Francisco Giants
