= Illinois's 8th House of Representatives district =

American legislative district

Illinois's 8th State House of Representatives district
Representative
La Shawn Ford; D–Chicago
since 2007
- Demographics: 26.5% White; 48.7% Black; 20.7% Hispanic; 1.6% Asian; 0.1% Native American; 0.0% Hawaiian/Pacific Islander; 0.3% Other; 2.3% Multiracial
- Population (2020): 109,504
- Created: 1983–present 1849–1873, 1957–1973

Illinois's 8th House of Representatives district is a Representative district within the Illinois House of Representatives located in Cook County, Illinois. It has been represented by Democrat La Shawn Ford since January 10, 2007. The district was previously represented by Democrat Calvin Giles from 1993 to 2007.

Located in the Chicago metropolitan area, the district includes parts of Berwyn, Broadview, Chicago, Cicero, Countryside, Forest Park, Hodgkins, La Grange, La Grange Park, North Riverside, Oak Park, Westchester, Western Springs and parts of the Chicago neighborhood of Austin.

== Representative district history ==
Prior to the ratification of the 1848 Illinois Constitution, counties (or two or more counties) were designated a certain number of Senators and Representatives. With the ratification of the 1848 Illinois Constitution, Legislative and Representative districts were numbered and called by name. Each district was still assigned a certain number of Senators and Representatives. After the passage of the 1872 Apportionment, only Legislative districts were drawn with Representatives elected cumulatively. The 1954 amendment to the 1870 Illinois Constitution established Representative districts as separate from Legislative districts (with representatives still elected cumulatively). The boundaries of Representative and Legislative districts would differ. After the United States Supreme Court ruled in Reynolds v. Sims (1964) that "both houses of state legislatures must be apportioned according to districts of equal population," new districts were redrawn for the Illinois Senate and Illinois House of Representatives. While the Legislative districts were redrawn, the Governor and General Assembly failed to agree on Representative district boundaries. Under the 1954 amendment, "a 10-man bipartisan commission appointed by the governor from recommendations made by both parties" were directed to redraw boundaries but failed to do so in 1963. Because of this failure, and with no district boundaries redrawn, all Representative districts were temporarily merged into one at-large district with 177 representatives (the total number of representatives at the time). The 1964 Illinois House election had several candidates running for all 177 seats throughout the state. In 1965, the Representative districts were redrawn by the Illinois Legislative Reapportionment Commission and elections held in 1966 were done with separate districts. With the 1971 Apportionment (and adoption of the 1970 Illinois Constitution), Representative districts were abolished and representatives were once again elected cumulatively per Legislative district. After the passage of the Cutback Amendment in 1980, the number of Representatives was reduced from 177 to 118 with Representative districts re-established and now electing a single representative.

== Prominent representatives ==
Representative	Notes
Jesse White	Elected the 37th Illinois Secretary of State (1999 – 2023)

== List of representatives ==
=== 1849 – 1854 ===
Representative	Party	Years (Note: From 1870 to 1970, the GA met for a new session on the Wednesday after the first Monday of January.)	General Assembly (GA)	Electoral history	Counties represented
7th Representative district established with 1848 Illinois Constitution.
William Pickering	Whig	January 1, 1849 – January 3, 1853	16th 17th	Redistricted from Edwards County House District and re-elected in 1848; Re-elected in 1850; Was not re-elected in 1852.	Edwards; Wabash
Victor B. Bell	Whig	January 3, 1853 – January 1, 1855	18th	Elected in 1852; Was not re-elected in 1854.	Edwards; Wabash
1854 Reapportionment now gives the district two Representatives to elect cumulatively.

=== 1854 – 1871 ===
Representative	Party	Party Control	Years	General Assembly (GA)	Electoral history	Counties represented
1854 Reapportionment now gives the district two Representatives to elect cumulatively.
Hugh Gregg	Democratic	2 Democrats	January 1, 1855 – January 5, 1857	19th	Elected in 1854; Was not re-elected in 1856.	Hamilton; Jefferson; Marion
T. B. Tanner	Democratic	2 Democrats	January 1, 1855 – January 5, 1857	19th	Elected in 1854; Was not re-elected in 1856.	Hamilton; Jefferson; Marion
John A. Wilson	Democratic	2 Democrats	January 5, 1857 – January 3, 1859	20th	Elected back in 1856; Was not re-elected in 1858.	Hamilton; Jefferson; Marion
William B. Anderson	Democratic	2 Democrats	January 5, 1857 – January 7, 1861	20th 21st	Elected in 1856; Re-elected in 1858; Was not re-elected in 1860.	Hamilton; Jefferson; Marion
John McElvaine	Democratic	2 Democrats	January 3, 1859 – January 7, 1861	21st	Elected in 1858; Was not re-elected in 1860.	Hamilton; Jefferson; Marion
Cyrus W. Webster	Unknown	2 Unknowns	January 7, 1861 – January 5, 1863	22nd	Elected in 1860; Was not re-elected in 1862.	Hamilton; Jefferson; Marion
Cloyd Crouch	Unknown	2 Unknowns	January 7, 1861 – January 5, 1863	22nd	Elected in 1860; Was not re-elected in 1862.	Hamilton; Jefferson; Marion
Samuel Moffatt	Unknown	2 Unknowns	January 5, 1863 – January 2, 1865	23rd	Elected in 1862; Was not re-elected in 1864.	Monroe; Randolph; Perry
Edmund Menard	Unknown	2 Unknowns	January 5, 1863 – January 2, 1865	23rd	Elected in 1862; Was not re-elected in 1864.	Monroe; Randolph; Perry
Austin James	Democratic	2 Democrats	January 2, 1865 – January 7, 1867	24th	Elected in 1864; Was not re-elected in 1866.	Monroe; Randolph; Perry
William K. Murphy	Democratic	2 Democrats	January 2, 1865 – January 4, 1869	24th 25th	Elected in 1864; Re-elected in 1866; Was not re-elected in 1868.	Monroe; Randolph; Perry
John Campbell	Unknown	1 Democrat; 1 Unknown	January 7, 1867 – January 4, 1869	25th	Elected in 1866; Was not re-elected in 1868.	Monroe; Randolph; Perry
Thomas H. Burgess	Republican	2 Republicans	January 4, 1869 – January 4, 1871	26th	Elected in 1868; Was not re-elected in 1870.	Monroe; Randolph; Perry
John M. McCutcheon	Republican	2 Republicans	January 4, 1869 – January 4, 1871	26th	Elected in 1868; Was not re-elected in 1870.	Monroe; Randolph; Perry
1870 Reapportionment now gives the district only 1 Representative.

=== 1871 – 1873 ===
Representative	Party	Years	General Assembly (GA)	Electoral history	Counties represented
1870 Reapportionment now gives the district only 1 Representative.
William Elder	Democratic	January 4, 1871 – January 8, 1873	27th	Elected back in 1870; Was not re-elected in 1872.	Saline
District abolished with 1872 Reapportionment as 3 Representatives were now elected cumulatively from Legislative districts.

=== 1957 – 1973 ===
Representative	Party	Party Control	Years (Note: Since 1970, the GA meets on the second Wednesday of January for a new session.)	General Assembly (GA)	Electoral history	Counties represented
District re-established in 1957.
Esther Saperstein	Democratic	2 Democrats; 1 Republican	January 9, 1957 – January 6, 1965	70th 71st 72nd 73rd	Elected in 1956; Re-elected in 1958; Re-elected in 1960; Re-elected in 1962; Redistricted to At-large district and re-elected in 1964.	Cook
Michael F. Zlatnik	Republican	2 Democrats; 1 Republican	January 9, 1957 – January 6, 1965	70th 71st 72nd 73rd	Elected in 1956; Re-elected in 1958; Re-elected in 1960; Re-elected in 1962; Did not run in At-large election and retired.	Cook
Paul Elward	Democratic	2 Democrats; 1 Republican	January 9, 1957 – January 6, 1965	70th 71st 72nd 73rd	Elected in 1956; Re-elected in 1958; Re-elected in 1960; Re-elected in 1962; Redistricted to At-large district and re-elected in 1964.	Cook
The district was temporarily abolished from 1965 to 1967 due to the Redistricting Commission in 1963 failing to reach an agreement. An at-large election was held electing 177 Representatives from across the state.
Jack E. Walker	Republican	2 Republicans; 1 Democrat	January 4, 1967 – January 13, 1971	75th 76th	Elected back in 1966; Re-elected in 1968; Elected state Senator in the 8th Legislative District in 1970.	Cook
John W. Thompson	Republican	2 Republicans; 1 Democrat	January 4, 1967 – January 10, 1973	75th 76th 77th	Elected in 1966; Re-elected in 1968; Re-elected in 1970; Retired.	Cook
Anthony Scariano	Democratic	2 Republicans; 1 Democrat	January 4, 1967 – January 10, 1973	75th 76th 77th	Redistricted from At-large District and won re-election in 1966; Re-elected in 1968; Re-elected in 1970; Ran for state Senator in the 9th Legislative District and lost in 1972.	Cook
Lynn Brenne	Republican	2 Republicans; 1 Democrat	January 13, 1971 – January 10, 1973	77th	Elected in 1970; Redistricted to the 9th Legislative District and lost re-election in 1972.	Cook
District abolished with 1971 Reapportionment as Representatives were once again elected from Legislative districts.

=== 1983 – Present ===
Representative	Party	Years	General Assembly (GA)	Electoral history	Counties represented
District re-established with representatives now elected one per district with the passage of the Cutback Amendment
Jesse White	Democratic	January 12, 1983 – December 1, 1992	83rd 84th 85th 86th	Redistricted from the 13th Legislative District and re-elected in 1982; Re-elected in 1984; Re-elected in 1986; Re-elected in 1988; Re-elected in 1990; Elected Cook County Recorder of Deeds and resigned his Representative seat in 1992.	Cook
Jesse White	Democratic	January 12, 1983 – December 1, 1992	87th	Redistricted from the 13th Legislative District and re-elected in 1982; Re-elected in 1984; Re-elected in 1986; Re-elected in 1988; Re-elected in 1990; Elected Cook County Recorder of Deeds and resigned his Representative seat in 1992.	Cook
Vacant		December 1, 1992 – January 13, 1993	87th		Cook
Robert LeFlore	Democratic	January 13, 1993 – May 3, 1993	88th	Redistricted from the 13th Representative District and re-elected in 1992; Died in 1993.	Cook
Vacant		May 3, 1993 – May 1993	88th		Cook
Calvin Giles	Democratic	May 1993 – January 10, 2007	88th 89th 90th 91st 92nd 93rd 94th	Appointed in 1993; Elected in 1994; Re-elected in 1996; Re-elected in 1998; Re-elected in 2000; Re-elected in 2002; Re-elected in 2004; Lost renomination in 2006.	Cook
La Shawn Ford	Democratic	January 10, 2007 – present	95th 96th 97th 98th 99th 100th 101st 102nd 103rd	Elected in 2006; Re-elected in 2008; Re-elected in 2010; Re-elected in 2012; Re-elected in 2014; Re-elected in 2016; Re-elected in 2018; Re-elected in 2020; Re-elected in 2022	Cook

== Historic District Boundaries ==
Years	County	Municipalities/Townships	Notes
2023 – present	Cook	Berwyn, Broadview, Chicago (Austin), Cicero, Countryside, Forest Park, Hodgkins, La Grange, La Grange Park, North Riverside, Oak Park, Westchester, Western Springs	
2013 – 2023	Cook	Berwyn, Brookfield, Chicago (Austin), Forest Park, La Grange, La Grange Park, North Riverside, Oak Park	
2003 – 2013	Cook		
1993 – 2003	Cook	Chicago	
1983 – 1993	Cook	Chicago	
1967 – 1973	Cook	Bloom Township, Rich Township, parts of Thornton Township	
1957 – 1965	Cook	Chicago	
1871 – 1873	Saline	Bankston, Eldorado, Gallatia, Harrisburg, Hartford, Independence, Mitchellsville, Raleigh, Saline City, Somerset, South America, Whitesville	
1863 – 1871	Monroe; Randolph; Perry	Appleton, Blair, Burksville, Chester, Cobb, Columbia, Coulterville, Denmark, Du Quoin, Eagle Cliff, Eden, Evansville, Florence, Freedom, Galum, Georgetown, Glasgow City, Grande Cole, Harrisonville, Holt Prairie, Iowa, Jones Creek, Jordan Grove, Kaskaskia, Liberty, Maysville, Mitchie, Monroe City, Morrison, Mt. Hawkins, Old Du Quoin, Pinckneyville, Pleasant Shade, Pollacks, Prairie du Rocher, Preston, Randolph, Red Bud, Renault, Ruma, St. Johns, Smith's Landing, Sparta, Steuben, Tamaroa, Waterloo	
1855 – 1863	Hamilton; Jefferson; Marion	Bear Creek, Belle Prairie (Belle Prairie City), Blissville, Centralia, Elkton, Farina, Farrington, Fosters, Fredericktown, Griswold, Hickory Hill, Jefferson, Jefferson City, Jordans Prairie, Junction (Junction City), Kinmundy, Lanes Roads, Logansport, Lovilla, Lynchburg, McLeansboro, Middleton, Moores Prairie, Mount Vernon, Odin, Palo Alto, Patoka, Ponti, Racoon, Rome, Salem, Sandoval, Spring Garden, Walnut Hill	
1849 – 1855	Edwards; Wabash	Albion, Armstrong, Centreville, Grayville, McChenes Bluff, Mier, Mills Prairie, Mount Carmel, Oxford, Palmyra, Rochester Mills (Rochester)	

== Electoral history ==
=== 2030 – 2022 ===
2022 Illinois House of Representatives election
Party	Candidate	Votes	%	±%
Democratic	La Shawn K. Ford (incumbent)	22,187	75.51	−24.49%
Republican	Thomas Hurley	7195	24.49	N/A
Total votes		29,382	100.0	

=== 2020 – 2012 ===
2020 Illinois House of Representatives election
Party	Candidate	Votes	%	±%
Democratic	La Shawn K. Ford (incumbent)	36,932	100.0	N/A
Total votes		36,932	100.0	

2018 Illinois House of Representatives election
Party	Candidate	Votes	%	±%
Democratic	La Shawn K. Ford (incumbent)	31,923	100.0	N/A
Total votes		31,923	100.0	

2016 Illinois House of Representatives election
Party	Candidate	Votes	%	±%
Democratic	La Shawn K. Ford (incumbent)	38,493	100.0	N/A
Total votes		38,493	100.0	

2014 Illinois House of Representatives election
Party	Candidate	Votes	%	±%
Democratic	La Shawn K. Ford (incumbent)	25,449	100.0	+0.03%
Total votes		25,449	100.0	

2012 Illinois House of Representatives election
Party	Candidate	Votes	%	±%
Democratic	La Shawn K. Ford (incumbent)	37,824	99.97	−0.03%
Write-in		10	0.03	N/A
Total votes		37,834	100.0	

=== 2010 – 2002 ===
2010 Illinois House of Representatives election
Party	Candidate	Votes	%	±%
Democratic	La Shawn K. Ford (incumbent)	23,179	100.0	N/A
Total votes		23,179	100.0	

2008 Illinois House of Representatives election
Party	Candidate	Votes	%	±%
Democratic	La Shawn K. Ford (incumbent)	34,666	100.0	+16.40%
Total votes		34,666	100.0	

2006 Illinois House of Representatives election
Party	Candidate	Votes	%	±%
Democratic	La Shawn K. Ford	21,057	83.60	+4.50%
Republican	Glenn L. Harris	2,975	11.81	−0.16%
Green	Nathan Paul Helsabeck	1,157	4.59	−4.34%
Total votes		25,189	100.0	

2006 Illinois House of Representatives Democratic primary
Party	Candidate	Votes	%
Democratic	La Shawn K. Ford	8,241	57.45
Democratic	Calvin Giles (incumbent)	6,104	42.55
Total votes		14,345	100.0

2004 Illinois House of Representatives election
Party	Candidate	Votes	%	±%
Democratic	Calvin Giles (incumbent)	30,408	79.10	+2.99%
Republican	Glenn L. Harris	4,601	11.97	−2.13%
Green	Julie Samuels	3,432	8.93	−0.87%
Total votes		38,441	100.0	

2002 Illinois House of Representatives election
Party	Candidate	Votes	%	±%
Democratic	Calvin L. Giles (incumbent)	19,264	76.11	−23.89%
Republican	Glenn L. Harris	3,568	14.10	N/A
Green	Julie Samuels	2,480	9.80	N/A
Total votes		25,312	100.0	

=== 2000 – 1992 ===
2000 Illinois House of Representatives election
Party	Candidate	Votes	%	±%
Democratic	Calvin L. Giles (incumbent)	30,638	100.0	N/A
Total votes		30,638	100.0	

1998 Illinois House of Representatives election
Party	Candidate	Votes	%	±%
Democratic	Calvin L. Giles (incumbent)	24,558	100.0	+12.58%
Total votes		24,558	100.0	

1996 Illinois House of Representatives election
Party	Candidate	Votes	%	±%
Democratic	Calvin L. Giles (incumbent)	28,766	87.42	+5.53%
Republican	Les Golden	4,140	12.58	−5.53%
Total votes		32,906	100.0	

1994 Illinois House of Representatives election
Party	Candidate	Votes	%	±%
Democratic	Calvin L. Giles (incumbent)	16,982	81.89	−18.11%
Republican	Melvin Delk	3,756	18.11	N/A
Total votes		20,738	100.0	

1992 Illinois House of Representatives election
Party	Candidate	Votes	%	±%
Democratic	Robert LeFlore, Jr.	34,226	100.0	+37.49%
Total votes		34,226	100.0	

=== 1990 – 1982 ===
1990 Illinois House of Representatives election
Party	Candidate	Votes	%	±%
Democratic	Jesse C. White, Jr. (incumbent)	17,929	62.51	+7.69%
Republican	Alan Spitz	10,751	37.49	−7.69%
Total votes		28,680	100.0	

1988 Illinois House of Representatives election
Party	Candidate	Votes	%	±%
Democratic	Jesse C. White, Jr. (incumbent)	24,970	54.82	−6.28%
Republican	Alan Spitz	20,578	45.18	+6.28%
Total votes		45,548	100.0	

1986 Illinois House of Representatives election
Party	Candidate	Votes	%	±%
Democratic	Jesse C. White, Jr. (incumbent)	17,456	61.10	+3.00%
Republican	Marshall R. Crawford	11,114	38.90	−2.99%
Total votes		28,570	100.0	

1984 Illinois House of Representatives election
Party	Candidate	Votes	%	±%
Democratic	Jesse C. White, Jr. (incumbent)	25,750	58.10	+1.66%
Republican	Marshall R. Crawford	18,567	41.89	−1.67%
Write-in		1	0.00	N/A
Total votes		44,318	100.0	

1982 Illinois House of Representatives election
Party	Candidate	Votes	%
Democratic	Jesse C. White, Jr.	19,606	56.44
Republican	Elroy C. Sandquist, Jr.	15,133	43.56
Write-in		1	0.00
Total votes		34,740	100.0

=== 1970 – 1962 ===
1970 Illinois House of Representatives election
Party	Candidate	Votes	%
Democratic	Anthony Scariano (incumbent)	67,272	32.87
Republican	John W. Thompson (incumbent)	59,253	28.95
Republican	Lynn G. Brenne	47,521.5	23.22
Democratic	John B. Hayes	30,632	14.97
Write-in		6	0.00
Total votes		204,684.5	100.0

1968 Illinois House of Representatives election
Party	Candidate	Votes	%
Republican	Jack E. Walker (incumbent)	82,335	31.01
Democratic	Anthony Scariano (incumbent)	73,828.5	27.81
Republican	John W. Thompson (incumbent)	66,858.5	25.18
Democratic	L. Michael Getty	42,450.5	15.99
Total votes		265,472.5	100.0

1966 Illinois House of Representatives election
Party	Candidate	Votes	%
Republican	Jack E. Walker	65,496.5	32.50
Republican	John W. Thompson	57,800	28.68
Democratic	Anthony Scariano	52,101	25.85
Democratic	Adolph S. Taborski	26,141.5	12.97
Total votes		201,539	100.0

1962 Illinois House of Representatives election
Party	Candidate	Votes	%
Democratic	Esther Saperstein (incumbent)	73,098.5	30.18
Democratic	Paul F. Elward (incumbent)	63,003	26.01
Republican	Michael F. Zlatnik (incumbent)	60,783.5	25.10
Republican	Edmund E. Deuss	45,305	18.71
Total votes		242,190	100.0

=== 1960 – 1956 ===
1960 Illinois House of Representatives election
Party	Candidate	Votes	%
Democratic	Esther Saperstein (incumbent)	89,592	30.49
Democratic	Paul F. Elward (incumbent)	78,679	26.78
Republican	Michael F. Zlatnik (incumbent)	69,497	23.65
Republican	Erwin L. Martay	56,081.5	19.09
Total votes		293,849.5	100.0

1958 Illinois House of Representatives election
Party	Candidate	Votes	%
Democratic	Esther Saperstein (incumbent)	73,033.5	35.35
Republican	Michael F. Zlatnik (incumbent)	71,935	34.82
Democratic	Paul F. Elward (incumbent)	61,604	29.82
Total votes		206,572.5	100.0

1956 Illinois House of Representatives election
Party	Candidate	Votes	%
Democratic	Esther Saperstein	79,510	27.70
Republican	Michael F. Zlatnik	70,573.5	24.58
Democratic	Paul F. Elward	68,900.5	24.00
Republican	Erwin L. Martay	68,101.5	23.72
Total votes		287,085.5	100.0
