= Shantel Franklin =

American politician

Member-elect of the Illinois House of Representatives from the 8th district
- Assuming office TBD
- Succeeding: La Shawn Ford

Personal details
- Born: 1993 or 1994 (age 32–33)
- Party: Democratic
- Education: Southern Illinois University Carbondale (BA); Indiana University Bloomington (MPA)

Shantel N. Franklin (1993/1994) is an American politician who is a Democratic member-elect of the Illinois House of Representatives for the 8th district. She is the first woman to represent the district.

== Early life and career ==
Franklin was raised on Chicago’s West Side. She earned a Bachelor of Arts in political science from Southern Illinois University Carbondale and a Master of Public Administration from Indiana University Bloomington. She is a member of the Delta Sigma Theta sorority.

Franklin has served as a community and legislative liaison in the Illinois Attorney General’s Office since around 2020. She is also a real estate agent.

== Political career ==
Franklin won the Democratic primary election with nearly 46% of the vote. She is unopposed in the general election.
