= Blair, Illinois =

Blair, Illinois may refer to:

- Blair, Livingston County, Illinois, an unincorporated community in Livingston County
- Blair, Randolph County, Illinois, an unincorporated community in Randolph County
