= Walsh, Illinois =

- Unincorporated community
- Location within Illinois Location within the United States
- Coordinates: 38°05′22″N 89°51′03″W
- Country: United States
- State: Illinois
- County: Randolph
- Elevation: 479 ft (146 m)
- Time zone: UTC-6 (Central (CST))
  - Summer (DST): UTC-5 (CDT)
- ZIP code: 62297
- Area code: 618
- GNIS feature ID: 420486

Walsh is an unincorporated community in Randolph County, Illinois, United States. Walsh is 5 miles (8.0 km) east of Evansville. Walsh has a post office with ZIP code 62297.
