= New Palestine =

New Palestine may refer to:

- New Palestine (magazine), a former magazine published by the Zionist Organization of America
- New Palestine, Indiana
- New Palestine, Illinois
- New Palestine, Ohio
