= Dozaville, Illinois =

- Unincorporated community
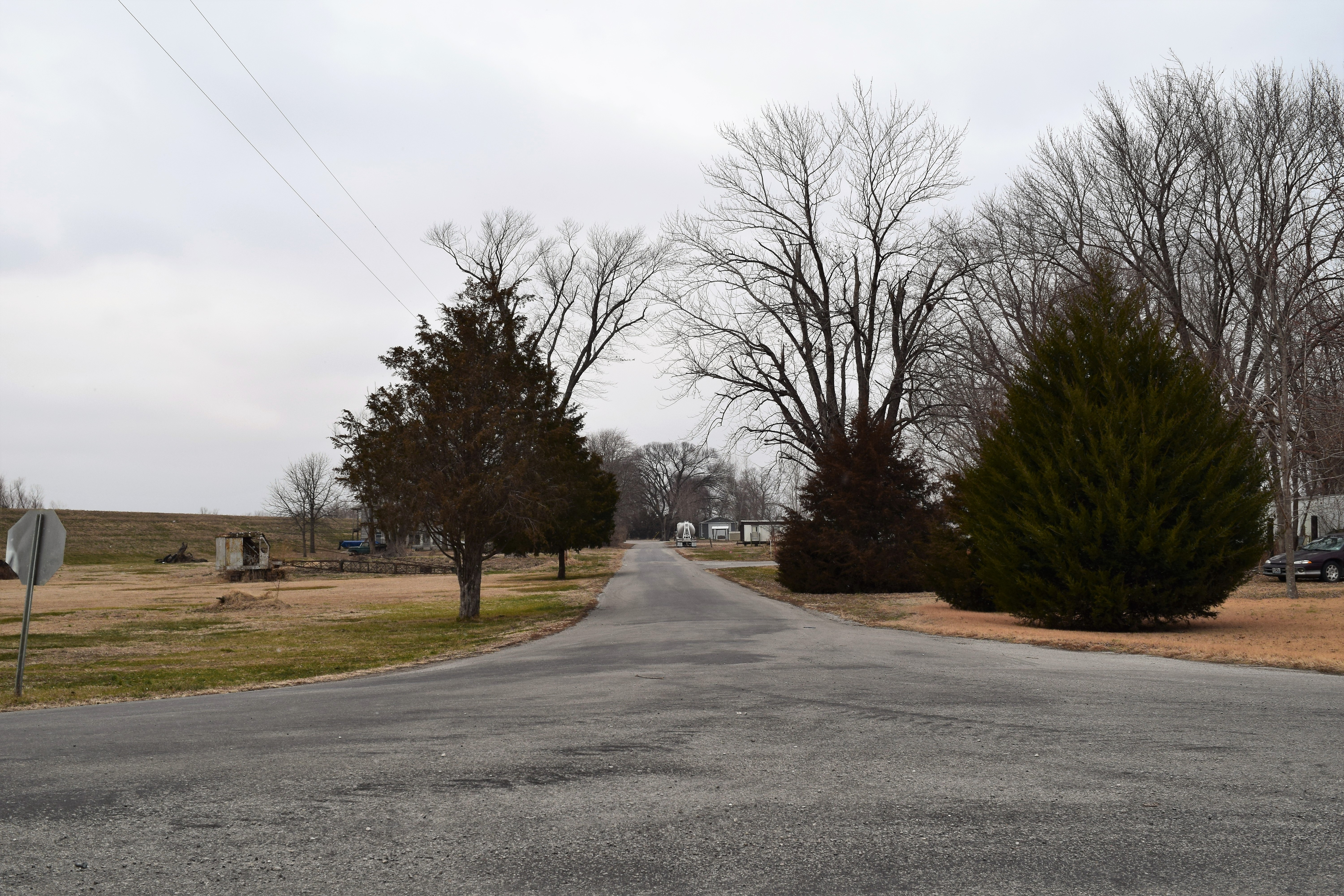
- An intersection in the community of Dozaville, Illinois. Located on Kaskaskia Island, the community is one of the few places in Illinois west of the Mississippi River.

- Location within Illinois Location within the United States
- Coordinates: 37°54′25″N 89°57′23″W
- Country: United States
- State: Illinois
- County: Randolph
- Precinct: Kaskaskia
- Elevation: 377 ft (115 m)
- Time zone: UTC-6 (Central (CST))
  - Summer (DST): UTC-5 (CDT)
- Area code: 618
- GNIS feature ID: 407374

Dozaville is an unincorporated community in Randolph County, Illinois, United States. Dozaville is located in Kaskaskia Precinct, which (exceptionally for Illinois) is west of the Mississippi River.

Dozaville was laid out in 1872 by William Doza, and named for him.
