= Leanderville, Illinois =

- Unincorporated community
- Location within Illinois Location within the United States
- Coordinates: 37°54′59″N 89°40′34″W
- Country: United States
- State: Illinois
- County: Randolph
- Elevation: 558 ft (170 m)
- Time zone: UTC-6 (Central (CST))
  - Summer (DST): UTC-5 (CDT)
- Area code: 618
- GNIS feature ID: 1764852

Leanderville is an unincorporated community in Randolph County, Illinois, United States. Leanderville is 8 miles (13 km) east of Chester.
