= Houston, Illinois =

- Unincorporated community
- Location within Illinois Location within the United States
- Coordinates: 38°09′33″N 89°46′52″W
- Country: United States
- State: Illinois
- County: Randolph
- Elevation: 440 ft (130 m)
- Time zone: UTC-6 (Central (CST))
  - Summer (DST): UTC-5 (CDT)
- Area code: 618
- GNIS feature ID: 410601

Houston is an unincorporated community in Randolph County, Illinois, United States. The community is located along Illinois Route 154 5 miles (8.0 km) northwest of Sparta.
