= Bremen, Randolph County, Illinois =

Bremen, Illinois
- Unincorporated community
- Location within Illinois Location within the United States
- Coordinates: 37°58′16″N 89°44′50″W
- Country: United States
- State: Illinois
- County: Randolph
- Elevation: 561 ft (171 m)
- Time zone: UTC-6 (Central (CST))
  - Summer (DST): UTC-5 (CDT)
- Area code: 618
- GNIS feature ID: 404810

Bremen is an unincorporated community in Randolph County, Illinois, United States. Bremen is located on Illinois Route 150, 5.5 miles (8.9 km) northeast of Chester.

== History ==
A post office called Bremen was established in 1856, and remained in operation until being discontinued in 1906. The community was named after Bremen, Germany.
