= Kaskaskia, Illinois =

Village in the United States

Kaskaskia
- Village
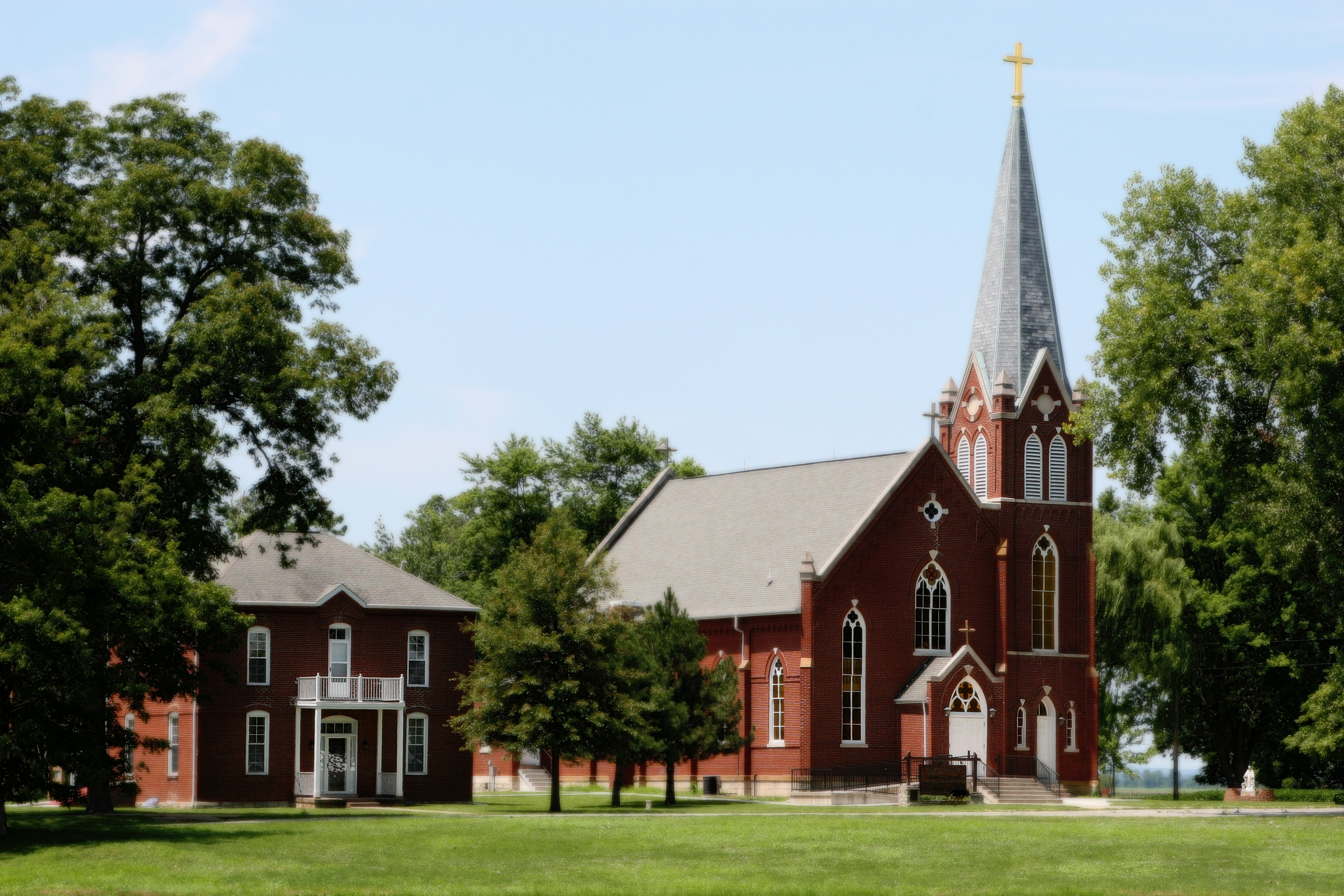
- Kaskaskia Church

- Location of Kaskaskia in Randolph County, Illinois
- Coordinates: 37°55′17″N 89°54′59″W
- Country: United States
- State: Illinois
- County: Randolph

Area
  - Total: 0.10 sq mi (0.27 km^{2})
  - Land: 0.10 sq mi (0.27 km^{2})
  - Water: 0 sq mi (0.00 km^{2})
- Elevation: 374 ft (114 m)

Population (2020)
  - Total: 21
  - Density: 199.0/sq mi (76.84/km^{2})
- Time zone: UTC-6 (CST)
  - Summer (DST): UTC-5 (CDT)
- ZIP code: 63673
- Area code: 618/366
- FIPS code: 17-39129
- GNIS feature ID: 2398330

Kaskaskia is a village in Randolph County, Illinois, on the present west side of the Mississippi River. The population of Kaskaskia was 21 in the 2020 United States census, making it the third-least populous incorporated community in Illinois behind Valley City (pop. 14) and Florence (pop. 17).

A historically important town, it was a Catholic mission and settlement by the French in Illinois Country in the early 1700s. It was founded near the confluence of the Mississippi and Kaskaskia River and between the two rivers, but almost two centuries later that would prove its undoing. It grew to become the regional center and was briefly the first capital of Illinois in 1818. But it was devastated by flooding in the mid and late 19th century, which shifted the course of the Mississippi from the west to east of the community.

Kaskaskia was cut off; its only road access to the remainder of Illinois required passage first through Missouri. Kaskaskia has an Illinois telephone area code (618) and a Missouri ZIP Code (63673). Its roads are maintained by Illinois Department of Transportation, and its few residents vote in Illinois elections. The village was evacuated in the Great Flood of 1993, which covered it with water more than 9 feet (2.7 m) deep.

== History ==
Kaskaskia was settled by France as part of the Illinois Country and was named for the Kaskaskia people. Its population peaked at around 7,000 as a regional center in the 18th century. During the American Revolutionary War, the town had become an administrative center for the British Province of Quebec, but it was taken by the Virginia militia during the Illinois campaign. For a few years, it was designated as the county seat of Illinois County, Virginia, after which it became part of the Northwest Territory under the United States government in 1787. When Randolph County was created in 1795 by the government of the Northwest Territory, it again became a county seat. Kaskaskia was also named as the capital of the Illinois Territory, created on February 3, 1809. Illinois became the 21st state in 1818, and the town served as the state's first capital until 1819, when the capital was moved to more centrally located Vandalia.

Most of the town was destroyed by flooding in April 1881 when the Mississippi River shifted eastward to a new channel, taking over the lower 10 miles (16 km) of the Kaskaskia River. This resulted from deforestation of the river banks during the 19th century, due to crews taking wood for fuel to feed the steamboat and railroad traffic. The river then passed east rather than west of the town. The state boundary line, however, remained in its original location. A small bridge crosses the old riverbed, which became a creek that sometimes fills with water during flood season.

The Kaskaskia tribe inhabited this area in the 1600s and traded with the early French colonists. During the Beaver Wars, Kaskaskia grew as people sought common defense against Iroquois raids. The numbers swelled to around twenty thousand people by the 1680s. Kaskaskia aligned with the French to aid in defense against the Iroquois. The French also gave them trade goods, which Kaskaskia merchants used to trade with Indian tribes too far South or West for French traders to reach. The Kaskaskia tribe became heavily involved in the slave trade, capturing and selling people from neighboring tribes.

By the 1690s, the Kaskaskia tribe was in decline. This was in part due to an epidemic that hit the large town particularly hard. By this time, it had also become harder to obtain sources of wood and bison near Kaskaskia.

=== French settlement ===
In 1703, French Jesuit missionaries established a mission with the goal of converting the American Indians to Catholicism. The congregation built its first stone church in 1714. The French also had a fur trading post in the village. Canadian settlers moved in to farm and to develop the lead mines on the opposite side of the river (now in Missouri).

Kaskaskia became a large settlement center attracting a large proportion of the region's American Indian population. It became the capital of Upper Louisiana, and the French built Fort de Chartres nearby in 1718. In the same year, they imported the first African slaves shipped from Santo Domingo to work as laborers in the lead mines.

In the years of early French settlement, Kaskaskia was peopled by a few French men and numerous Illinois and other American Indians. In 1707, the population of the community was estimated at 2,200, the majority of them Illinois who lived somewhat apart from the French. A visitor around 1717 said that the village consisted of 400 Illinois men, two Jesuit missionaries, and "about twenty French voyageurs who have settled there and married Indian women." The births and baptisms of 21 children were recorded in Kaskaskia before 1714; 18 had mothers who were Indian and 20 had fathers who were French. One Indian woman disowned her mixed-race son for living "among the savage nations".

Many of the Canadiens and their descendants at Kaskaskia became voyageurs and coureurs des bois, who would explore the Missouri River country for fur trading. The Canadiens had the goal of trading with all the Prairie tribes, and beyond them, with the Spanish colony in New Mexico. The Spanish intended to keep control of the trade. The Canadien goals stimulated the expedition of Claude Charles Du Tisne to establish trade relations with the Plains Indians in 1719.

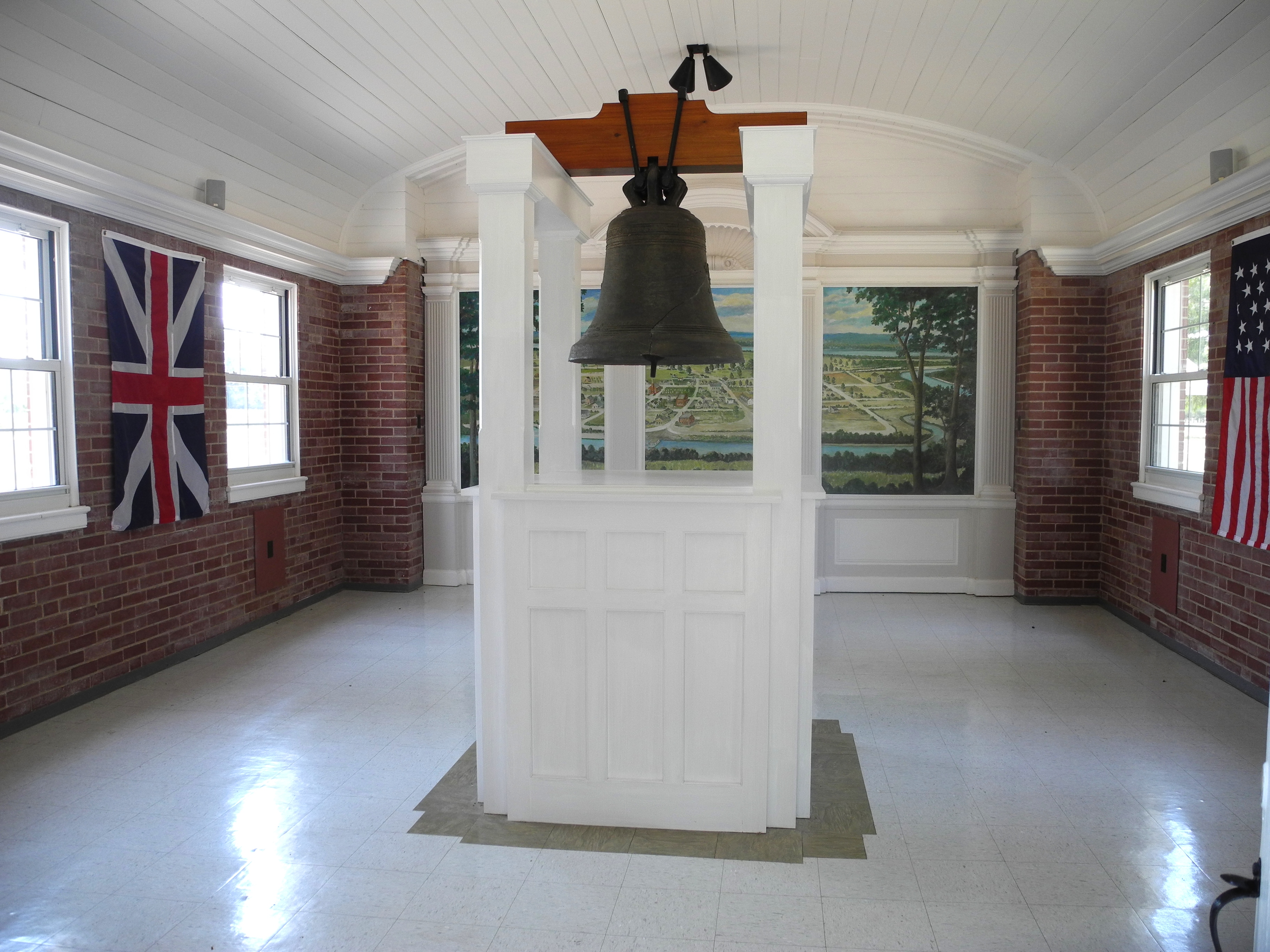
The bell donated by King of France Louis XV in 1741, later called the "Liberty Bell of the West", after it was rung to announce the U.S. victory in the Revolution

King Louis XV sent a bell to Kaskaskia in 1741 for its church. During the years of French rule, Kaskaskia and the other agricultural settlements in the Illinois Country were critical for supplying Lower Louisiana with wheat and corn, as these staple crops could not be grown in the Gulf climate. Farmers shipped tons of flour south over the years, which helped New Orleans survive.

The French settlers raised Fort Kaskaskia around 1759, an earthen redoubt that stood atop the bluff that overlooked the frontier village. In 1763, the French ceded the Illinois country to Great Britain after being defeated in the French and Indian War. The British abandoned Fort de Chartres in May 1772, but Kaskaskia continued to survive as a primarily French-speaking village on the Mississippi River frontier.

=== American settlement ===
The city fell on July 4, 1778, during the American Revolution to George Rogers Clark and his force of 200 men, including Captains Joseph Bowman and Leonard Helm. The parish rang the church bell in celebration, and it has since been called the "liberty bell". The brick church built in 1843 in the squared-off French style was later moved to the restored village of Kaskaskia on the west side of the Mississippi.

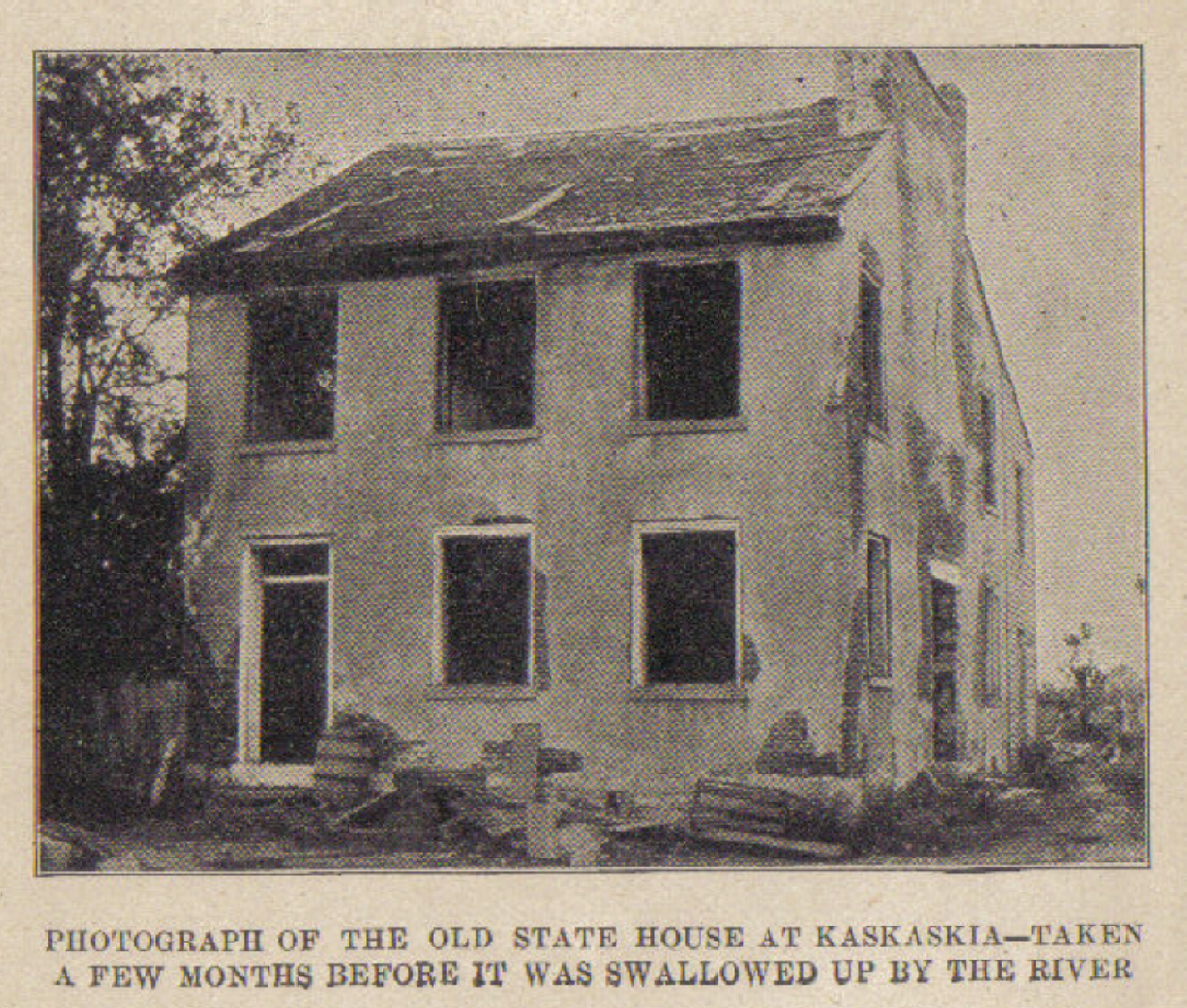
Kaskaskia state house as it stood in late 1880 or early 1881

In 1803, Chief Jean Baptiste De Coigne (1750–1811), the son of a Tamaroa mother and a French fur trader and interpreter, Jean Baptiste de Coigne (1720–1796), who had helped George Rogers Clark capture Kaskaskia in 1776, as well as smoked a peace pipe and corresponded with then Virginia governor (and now President) Thomas Jefferson, signed a treaty with the United States, arranged by William Henry Harrison, who was then governor of the Indiana Territory. In 1800 the Kaskaskia and allies had fought the Shawnee, their traditional enemies, and both sides suffered heavy casualties. De Coigne claimed to "rightfully represent" the Kaskaskia tribe as well as the Cahokia, Mitchigamia, and Tamaroa tribes. De Coigne died the following year and is buried somewhere in what had been Randolph County in his day. His son, Louis Jefferson De Coigne, succeeded his father in 1811.

The Kaskaskia and associated tribes were allotted 350 acres (140 ha) "near the town of Kaskaskia", as well as the right to relocate to another larger settlement within the ceded territory, in exchange for a tract of land comprising approximately half the area of Illinois. De Coigne also received a house and lot of "no more than one hundred acres" and a "suitable sum" of all material and monetary payments to the tribe would be reserved for the chief and his family.

Kaskaskia served as the capital of Illinois Territory from 1809 until statehood was gained in 1818, and then as the state capital until 1819. The Illinois Herald was the first Illinois newspaper, published here on June 24, 1814. In 1818, it was the site of the state's first constitutional convention and first legislative session.

The city's peak population was about 7,000 before the capital was moved in 1819 to Vandalia. The introduction of steamboats on the Mississippi River stimulated the economies of river towns in the 19th century, but their use also had widespread environmental effects. Deforestation of the river banks followed steamboat crews' regular cutting of trees, which were used to feed the engine boiler fires as fuel to power the steamboats. River banks eroded and became unstable, resulting in massive amounts of soil collapsing into the flowing water.

The Peoria tribe signed a second treaty in 1832, speaking for the Kaskaskia, Cahokia, Mitchigamia, and Tamaroa tribes. This treaty was arranged by Superintendent of Indian Affairs William Clark and was signed two months after the end of the Black Hawk War in northwestern Illinois between the Sauk tribe and the United States. The Kaskaskia treaty of 1832 relinquished all lands reserved for the tribe in the 1803 treaty with the exception of 350 acres (140 ha) near Kaskaskia, reserved to Ellen Ducoigne, a daughter of Jean Baptiste Ducoigne who had married a white man. All other members of all five tribes mentioned in the treaty were relocated to Indian Country in Kansas.

=== Effects of the Mississippi River ===
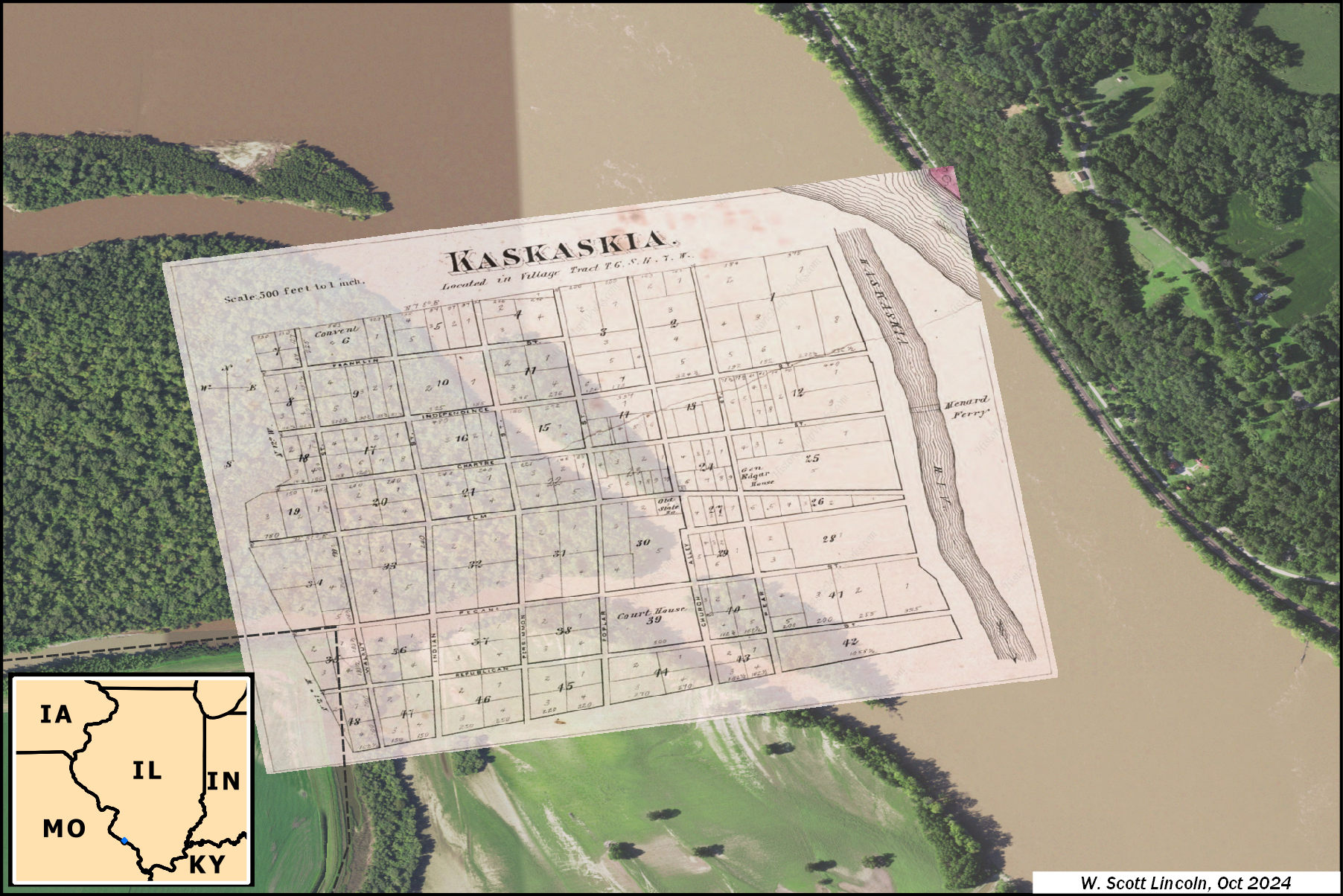
1875 map of Kaskaskia, Illinois, overlaid upon satellite imagery from 2019. Most of the original town site of Kaskaskia is now covered by the Mississippi River, including the location of the first Illinois state house. The Mississippi and the Kaskaskia River altered their banks.

The Mississippi River became wider and more shallow from St. Louis to the confluence of the Ohio River, resulting in more severe seasonal flooding. In the late 19th century, the town was cut off from the Illinois mainland and mostly destroyed by repeated flooding and a channel change by the Mississippi River. Much of Kaskaskia and other French colonial towns on the river has been lost. Following the Great Flood of 1844, residents of Kaskaskia relocated the town to the south. The original location of Kaskaskia became an island, surrounded by the Mississippi River. The flood of 1881 destroyed all remnants of the original town and the Mississippi shifted into the channel of the Kaskaskia River, passing east instead of west.

Parts of the town were rebuilt in the new area. As the Mississippi continued to flow through its new bed, earth was deposited so that the village land became physically attached to the west bank of the river, which primarily lies within the boundaries of the state of Missouri. A small bridge carries traffic from the mainland over the bayou to Kaskaskia and its surrounding farmlands in the floodplain. A levee lines the river to the east. In 1893, the people of the town moved and rebuilt the Church of the Immaculate Conception at Kaskaskia. They also built a shrine in a similar style nearby to house the "liberty bell".

By 1950, only 112 people lived in Kaskaskia. By 1970, the population had fallen to 79, and it continued to decline to 33 in 1980. The town was submerged under nine feet of water by the Great Flood of 1993, which reached the roofs of the buildings. By 2000, Kaskaskia was almost a ghost town with only nine residents, the least populous incorporated community in the state of Illinois.

== Geography ==
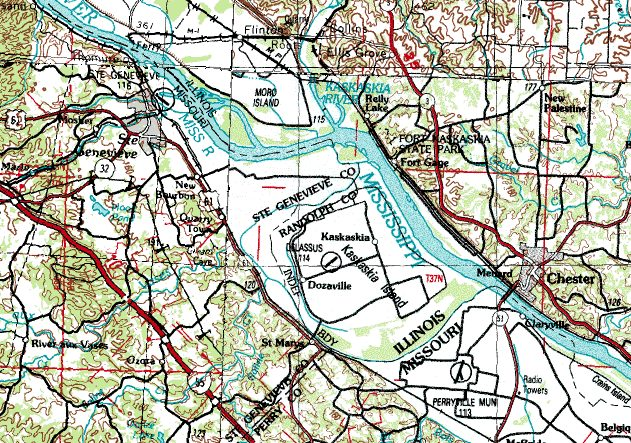
USGS topographic map of Kaskaskia

According to the 2020 census, Kaskaskia has a total area of 0.106 square miles (0.273 km^{2}), all land. However, the village comprises only a small part of Kaskaskia Precinct, which includes all of Randolph County's land west of the Mississippi. Kaskaskia Precinct has a land area of 24.037 sq mi (62.256 km^{2}) and a 2020 census population of 31 people. In 1993 the Mississippi River almost completely flooded the island.

== Demographics ==
Historical population
Year	Pop.	±%
1818	7,267	—
1900	177	−97.6%
1910	142	−19.8%
1920	152	+7.0%
1930	107	−29.6%
1940	131	+22.4%
1950	112	−14.5%
1960	97	−13.4%
1970	79	−18.6%
1980	33	−58.2%
1990	32	−3.0%
2000	9	−71.9%
2010	14	+55.6%
2020	21	+50.0%
U.S. Decennial Census 2020; Source: U.S. Decennial Census

As of the census of 2000, there were 9 people, 4 households, and 3 families residing in the village. The population density was 83.0/sq mi (32.0/km^{2}). There were 5 housing units at an average density of 46.1/sq mi (17.8/km^{2}). The racial makeup of the village was 7 White, 1 Pacific Islander, 1 from other races. There were 2 Hispanics or Latinos of any race.

There were four households, none of which had children under the age of 18 living with them. Two were married couples living together, one had a female householder with no husband present, and one was a non-family. One household was made up of individuals, and one had someone living alone who was 65 years of age or older. The average household size was 2.25 and the average family size was 2.67.

In the village two people were under the age of 18, both girls. There was one person from 18 to 24, one from 25 to 44, two from 45 to 64, and three who were 65 years of age or older. The median age was 48 years. There were seven females and two males.

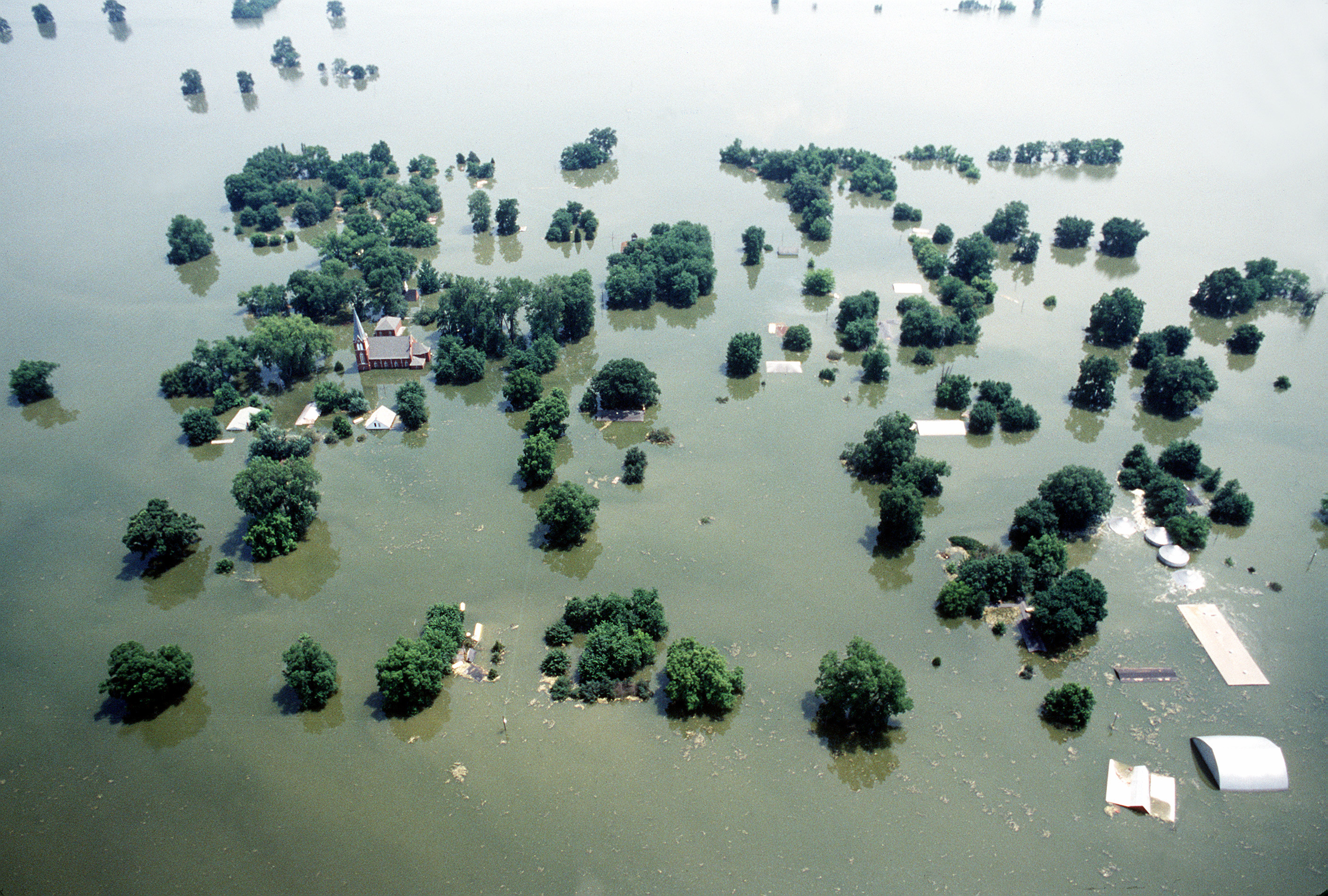
1993 flooding of Kaskaskia, looking south downriver; church spire is in center left

== Notable people ==
- David J. Baker (1792–1869), United States senator
- David J. Baker Jr. (1834–1899), Chief Justice of the Illinois Supreme Court
- Shadrach Bond (1773–1832), the first Governor of Illinois from 1818 to 1822.
- John Duff, outlaw and Revolutionary War soldier; scout and sergeant under George Rogers Clark
- Thomas Duncan, general during the American Civil War
- John Edgar, businessman and legislator
- George Fisher, pioneer, physician, and legislator
- William Gillis (businessman) (1788–1869), businessman, one of the founders of Kansas City, Missouri
- John Rice Jones, jurist and politician
- Samuel Judy, pioneer and legislator
- Elias Kane, first Illinois Secretary of State, United States senator
- Lucien Maxwell, rancher
- John Willis Menard, the first African American elected to the United States Congress
- James L. D. Morrison, Mexican War officer, U.S. Representative, gubernatorial candidate
- John Doyle Lee, Colleague of Brigham Young, leader of the Mountain Meadows Massacre
- Nance Legins-Costley (1813–1892), first slave freed by Abraham Lincoln in 1841.
- Thomas Jefferson Vance Owen (1801–1835), served as the first president of the Board of Trustees of the 'Town of Chicago'.
- Étienne de Boré (1741–1820), served as the first Mayor of New Orleans

== See also ==
- Kaskaskia Bell State Memorial
