= Esther Saperstein =

American politician (1901–1988)

Member of the Chicago City Council from the 49th Ward
- In office February 25, 1975 – April 16, 1979
- Preceded by: Paul T. Wigoda
- Succeeded by: David Orr

Member of the Illinois Senate from the 11th district
- In office January 11, 1967 – February 25, 1975
- Preceded by: Michael Brady
- Succeeded by: Redistricting

Member of the Illinois House of Representatives from the 8th district
- In office January 9, 1957 – January 6, 1965
- Preceded by: Redistricting
- Succeeded by: District re-established

Personal details
- Born: October 22, 1901 Chicago, Illinois, U.S.
- Died: May 17, 1988 (aged 86) Chicago, Illinois, U.S.
- Party: Democratic
- Education: Northwestern University

Esther Richman Saperstein (October 22, 1901 – May 17, 1988) was an American legislator, women's rights advocate and mental health activist. She was the first Democratic woman elected to the Illinois Senate.

Saperstein was born in Chicago, Illinois, to Jewish immigrants, Ellis Richman from Russia and Mary Dresser from Poland. Saperstein went to Chicago public schools and Northwestern University. Saperstein was active in the local Parent-Teacher Association. In 1955, Saperstein ran for the Chicago City Council and lost the election. Saperstein was a Democrat. In 1957, Saperstein served in the Illinois House of Representatives and served until 1967. Saperstein then served in the Illinois State Senate from 1967 until 1975 when she resigned from the Illinois General Assembly. In 1975, Saperstein was elected to the Chicago City Council and served until 1979. Saperstein died at her home in Chicago, Illinois.

A Chicago park was named in her honor in 2004.
