= Fort Gage, Illinois =

- Unincorporated community
- Location within Illinois Location within the United States
- Coordinates: 37°57′38″N 89°54′16″W
- Country: United States
- State: Illinois
- County: Randolph
- Elevation: 387 ft (118 m)
- Time zone: UTC-6 (Central (CST))
  - Summer (DST): UTC-5 (CDT)
- Area code: 618
- GNIS feature ID: 422708

Fort Gage is an unincorporated community in Randolph County, Illinois, United States. The community is on the Mississippi River at the intersection of County Routes 3 and 6, 5.6 miles (9.0 km) northwest of Chester.
