= Wine Hill, Illinois =

- Unincorporated community
- Location within Illinois Location within the United States
- Coordinates: 37°56′56″N 89°40′28″W
- Country: United States
- State: Illinois
- County: Randolph
- Elevation: 581 ft (177 m)
- Time zone: UTC-6 (Central (CST))
  - Summer (DST): UTC-5 (CDT)
- Area code: 618
- GNIS feature ID: 423321

Wine Hill is an unincorporated community in Randolph County, Illinois, United States. Wine Hill is 7 miles (11 km) west-northwest of Campbell Hill.

Wine Hill was so named in the 19th century from the vineyards started by German immigrants.
