= Prairie, Illinois =

- Unincorporated community
- Location within Illinois Location within the United States
- Coordinates: 38°10′23″N 89°56′35″W
- Country: United States
- State: Illinois
- County: Randolph
- Elevation: 410 ft (120 m)
- Time zone: UTC-6 (Central (CST))
  - Summer (DST): UTC-5 (CDT)
- Area code: 618
- GNIS feature ID: 416093

Prairie is an unincorporated community in Randolph County, Illinois, United States. Prairie is 4 miles (6.4 km) southeast of Red Bud.
