= Kaskaskia Bell State Memorial =

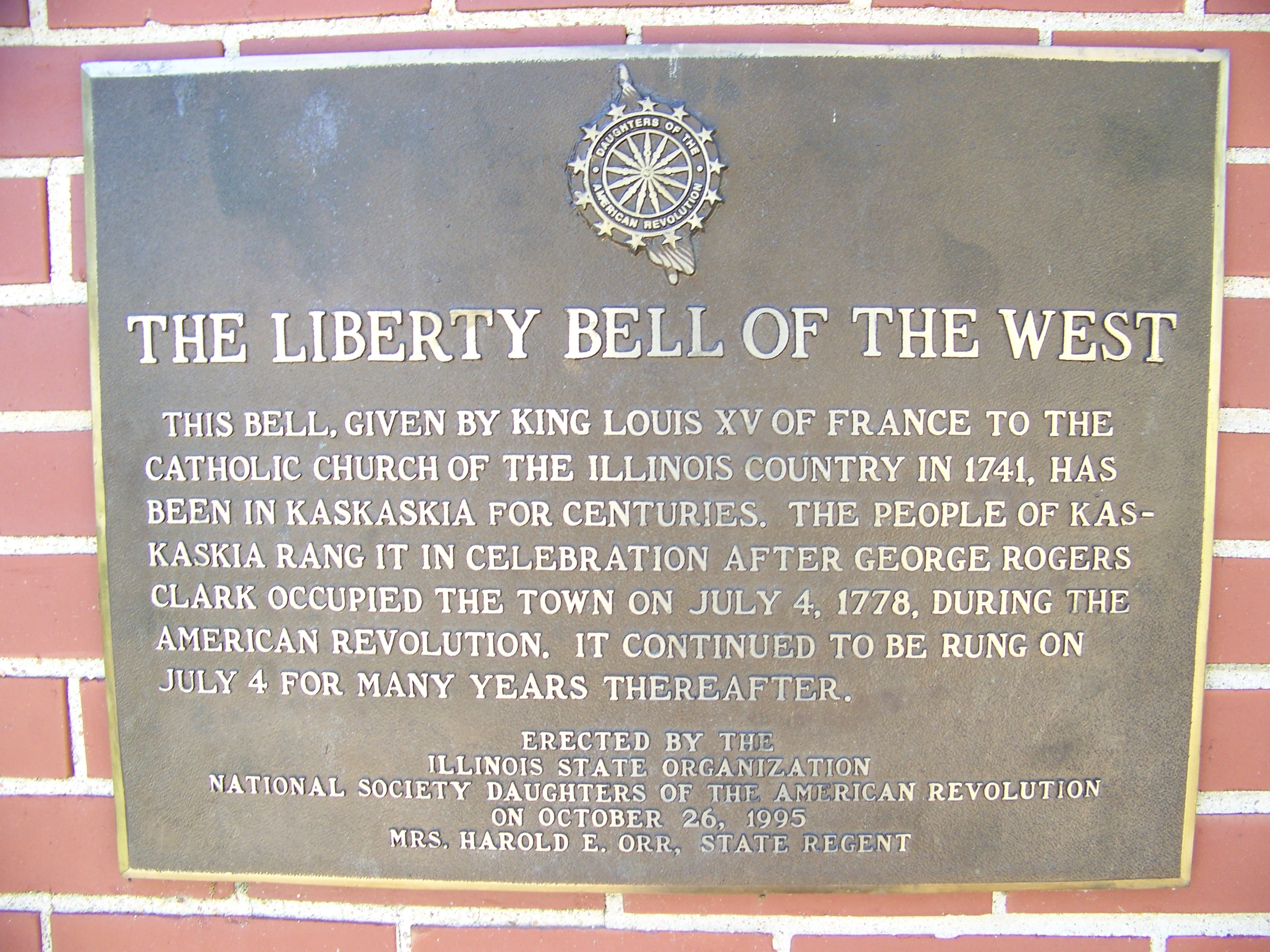
- Plaque found on the exterior of the structure housing the bell
- Interactive map of Kaskaskia Bell State Memorial
- Location: Kaskaskia, Illinois
- Coordinates: 37.9227°N 89.9147°W
- Built: 1948

Kaskaskia Bell State Memorial is a monument located in Kaskaskia, Illinois containing the Kaskaskia Bell, also known as "The Liberty Bell of the West," a gift from King Louis XV of France to the Catholic Church of New France. The 140-pound bell was cast in 1741 in La Rochelle, France. George Rogers Clark took Kaskaskia from the British on July 4, 1778, and the bell was rung in celebration. From then on, it was known as the Liberty Bell of the West. The building housing the bell was built in 1948. An audio program has been added sharing the history of the bell with visitors. The bell was washed away from its stand during both the Flood of 1973 and the Great Flood of 1993, widening the hairline crack discovered in 1948. As a result, the bell can no longer be rung, although Independence Day ceremonies are still held. The site is maintained by the Illinois Historic Preservation Division.
