= Menard, Illinois =

Unincorporated community in Illinois, United States

- Unincorporated community
- Location within Illinois Location within the United States
- Coordinates: 37°54′36″N 89°50′23″W
- Country: United States
- State: Illinois
- County: Randolph
- Elevation: 495 ft (151 m)
- Time zone: UTC-6 (Central (CST))
  - Summer (DST): UTC-5 (CDT)
- ZIP code: 62259
- Area code: 618
- GNIS feature ID: 422972

Menard is an unincorporated community in Randolph County, Illinois, United States. Menard is located on the east bank of the Mississippi River, west of Chester. Menard Correctional Center is located within the community. Menard has a post office with ZIP code 62259.

== Government and infrastructure ==
The Illinois Department of Corrections Menard Correctional Center is located in the Menard area and in Chester. Prior to the January 11, 2003 commutation of death row sentences, male death row inmates were housed in Menard, Tamms, and Pontiac correctional centers. After that date, only Pontiac continued to host the male death row.
