= Preston, Illinois =

- Unincorporated community
- Location within Illinois Location within the United States
- Coordinates: 38°06′22″N 89°51′36″W
- Country: United States
- State: Illinois
- County: Randolph
- Elevation: 469 ft (143 m)
- Time zone: UTC-6 (Central (CST))
  - Summer (DST): UTC-5 (CDT)
- Area code: 618
- GNIS feature ID: 416200

Preston is an unincorporated community in Randolph County, Illinois, United States. The community is located along County Route 1 4.4 miles (7.1 km) east-northeast of Evansville.
