= Marigold, Illinois =

- Unincorporated community
- Location within Illinois Location within the United States
- Coordinates: 38°04′47″N 90°00′23″W
- Country: United States
- State: Illinois
- County: Randolph
- Elevation: 568 ft (173 m)
- Time zone: UTC-6 (Central (CST))
  - Summer (DST): UTC-5 (CDT)
- Area code: 618
- GNIS feature ID: 422939

Marigold is an unincorporated community in Randolph County, Illinois, United States. The community is located on County Route 12, 4.9 miles (7.9 km) east of Prairie du Rocher.
