= Welge, Illinois =

- Unincorporated community
- Location within Illinois Location within the United States
- Coordinates: 37°57′23″N 89°42′45″W
- Country: United States
- State: Illinois
- County: Randolph
- Elevation: 404 ft (123 m)
- Time zone: UTC-6 (Central (CST))
  - Summer (DST): UTC-5 (CDT)
- Area code: 618
- GNIS feature ID: 420726

Welge is an unincorporated community in Randolph County, Illinois, United States. Welge is 6.5 miles (10.5 km) northeast of Chester.
