= Percy, Illinois =

Percy
- Village
- Location of Percy in Randolph County, Illinois.
- Coordinates: 38°00′53″N 89°37′24″W
- Country: United States
- State: Illinois
- County: Randolph

Area
  - Total: 0.99 sq mi (2.57 km^{2})
  - Land: 0.98 sq mi (2.54 km^{2})
  - Water: 0.012 sq mi (0.03 km^{2})
- Elevation: 469 ft (143 m)

Population (2020)
  - Total: 906
  - Density: 924.5/sq mi (356.95/km^{2})
- Time zone: UTC-6 (CST)
  - Summer (DST): UTC-5 (CDT)
- ZIP code: 62272
- Area code: 618
- FIPS code: 17-59104
- GNIS feature ID: 2399654

Percy is a village in Randolph County, Illinois, United States. As of the 2020 census, Percy had a population of 906.

== Geography ==
According to the 2010 census, Percy has a total area of 0.933 square miles (2.42 km^{2}), of which 0.93 square miles (2.41 km^{2}) (or 99.68%) is land and 0.003 square miles (0.01 km^{2}) (or 0.32%) is water.

== Demographics ==
Historical population
Census	Pop.	Note	%±
1900	660		—
1910	1,033		56.5%
1920	1,280		23.9%
1930	907		−29.1%
1940	958		5.6%
1950	933		−2.6%
1960	810		−13.2%
1970	967		19.4%
1980	1,053		8.9%
1990	925		−12.2%
2000	942		1.8%
2010	970		3.0%
2020	906		−6.6%
U.S. Decennial Census

As of the census of 2000, there were 942 people, 387 households, and 250 families residing in the village. The population density was 1,070.6 inhabitants per square mile (413.4/km^{2}). There were 431 housing units at an average density of 489.8 units per square mile (189.1 units/km^{2}). The racial makeup of the village was 98.94% White, 0.21% African American, 0.21% Native American, 0.32% from other races, and 0.32% from two or more races. Hispanic or Latino of any race were 2.23% of the population.

There were 387 households, out of which 28.4% had children under the age of 18 living with them, 51.9% were married couples living together, 10.3% had a female householder with no husband present, and 35.4% were non-families. 30.5% of all households were made up of individuals, and 16.0% had someone living alone who was 65 years of age or older. The average household size was 2.33 and the average family size was 2.89.

In the village, the population was spread out, with 22.0% under the age of 18, 9.7% from 18 to 24, 27.8% from 25 to 44, 21.4% from 45 to 64, and 19.1% who were 65 years of age or older. The median age was 39 years. For every 100 females, there were 88.0 males. For every 100 females age 18 and over, there were 84.7 males.

The median income for a household in the village was $31,333, and the median income for a family was $35,956. Males had a median income of $28,043 versus $20,385 for females. The per capita income for the village was $15,524. About 8.1% of families and 11.3% of the population were below the poverty line, including 20.7% of those under age 18 and 3.5% of those age 65 or over.
