= Kaskaskia Precinct, Randolph County, Illinois =

Kaskaskia Precinct
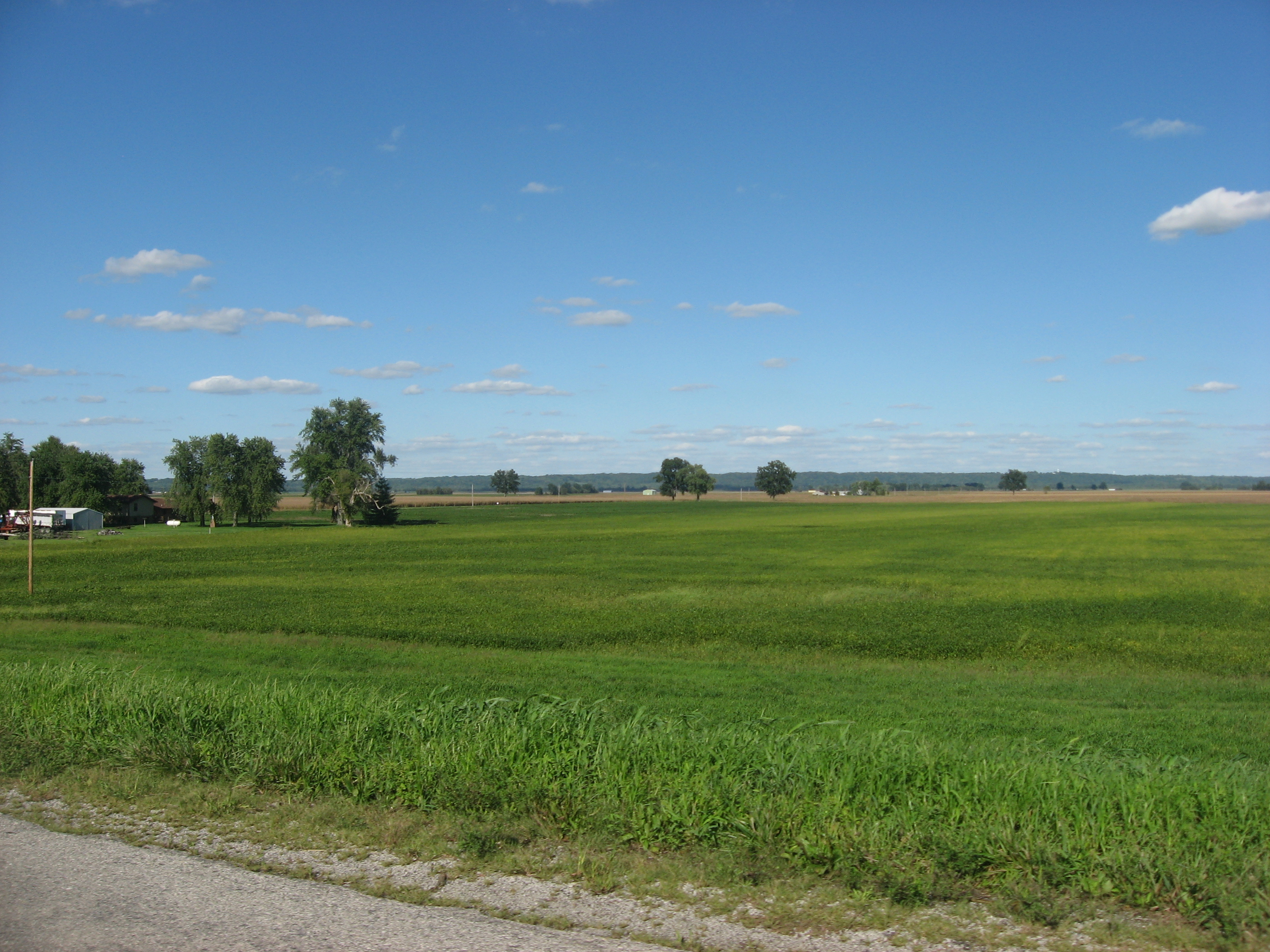
- Fields in the precinct

- Location in Randolph County
- Coordinates: 37°54′46″N 089°54′57″W
- Country: United States
- State: Illinois
- County: Randolph

Area
  - Total: 26.72 sq mi (69.20 km^{2})
  - Land: 24.04 sq mi (62.26 km^{2})
  - Water: 2.68 sq mi (6.95 km^{2}) 10.04%
- Elevation: 381 ft (116 m)

Population (2010)
  - Total: 47
  - Density: 2.0/sq mi (0.75/km^{2})
- GNIS feature ID: 1928551

Kaskaskia Precinct is located in Randolph County, Illinois, USA. As of the 2010 census, its population was 47. This precinct is separated from the rest of Randolph County (and the rest of Illinois) by the Mississippi River.

== Geography ==
Kaskaskia Precinct covers an area of 69.20 square kilometres (26.72 mi^{2}).
