= Paul Elward =

American politician (1926–2009)

Member of the Illinois House of Representatives

Personal details
- Party: Democratic
- Website: https://elward.org/

Paul Francis Elward (April 19, 1926 – August 9, 2009) was an American politician who served in the Illinois House of Representatives as a member of the Democratic Party.

== Early life and education ==
Paul Elward was born in Chicago, Illinois, to Daisyann Lenert Elward and Joseph Francis Elward. His brother James J. Elward was a writer and performer. Paul Elward attended St. Ignatius Grammar School and then graduated from Loyola Academy at the age of sixteen. After serving in the United States Navy from 1944 to 1946, Elward went on to Loyola University Chicago, where he graduated with Honors in 1947. A noted debater, Elward won numerous collegiate debate competitions and also spoke in the Pan-American Congress of 1947. Elward was President of the Alpha Sigma Nu, Jesuit Honorary Society, 1954-1958 Loyola of Chicago.

== Career ==
A noted Chicago Democrat along with Mayor Richard J. Daley, Paul F. Elward served in the Illinois House of Representatives as the 8th (later the 10th) district's representative in the State Capital Springfield, Illinois. A Roman Catholic, Elward was Pro-Life and Pro-Gun Control. Representing the 8th District, 1957–1966, and 10th District 1967–1969 (remapped district), Elward also held the position of House Majority Whip in 1966.

He was secretary of the Judicial Advisory Council and Chairman of the Executive Mansion Commission as well as Chairman of the Rules Committee. Elward was also a member of the Legislative Audit Commission. As a delegate to the current (Sixth) [Illinois Constitutional Convention] in 1969–1970, Elward's role included instrumental parliamentary efforts to control aspects of the constitution.

Elward was an Illinois Circuit Court of Cook County Judge for over two decades (1970 to 1994). As judge in one of the largest unified court systems in the world, Elward presided over numerous substantive cases. Elward handled an expedited motion call where he disposed of hundreds of old cases. Elward was also recognized in the supreme court decision requiring OSHA to release documents under subpoena in Marshall v. Elward.

Elward held the distinction of having practiced law for over fifty years, and was recognized in a resolution by the City Council of Chicago.
