= La Shawn Ford =

American politician (born 1972)

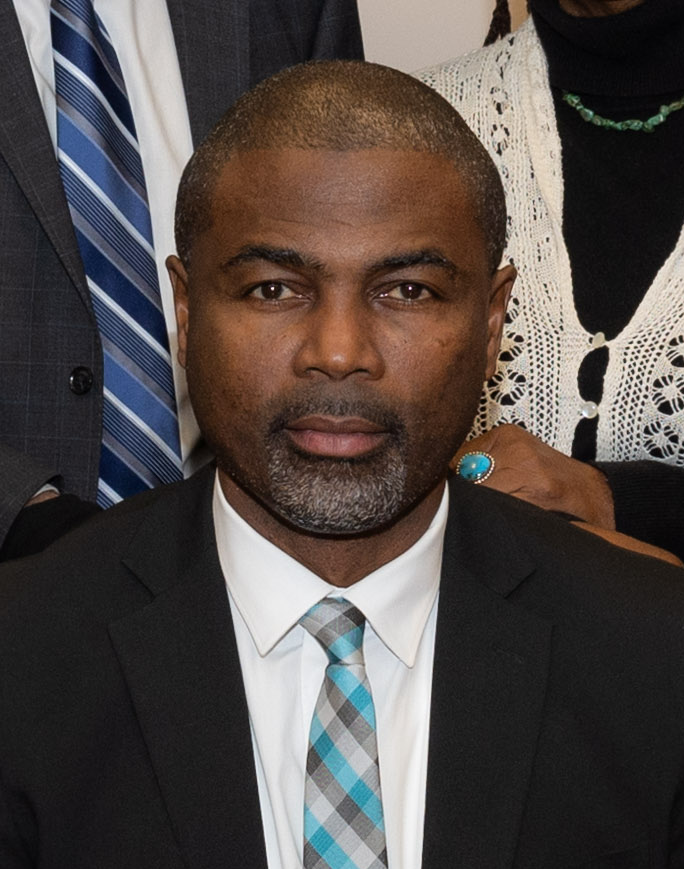
- Ford in 2023

Member-elect of the U.S. House of Representatives from Illinois's 7th district
- Assuming office January 3, 2027
- Succeeding: Danny Davis

Member of the Illinois House of Representatives from the 8th district
- Incumbent
- Assumed office January 10, 2007
- Preceded by: Calvin Giles

Personal details
- Born: February 28, 1972 (age 54) Chicago, Illinois, U.S.
- Party: Democratic
- Children: 1
- Education: Niles College Seminary (attended); Loyola University Chicago (BS); University of Illinois, Chicago (attended)
- Website: Campaign website

La Shawn K. Ford (born February 28, 1972) is an American politician who is a Democratic member of the Illinois House of Representatives, representing the 8th district since 2007. The district includes the West Side of Chicago and the suburbs of Oak Park, Berwyn, North Riverside, Forest Park, Proviso Township, Brookfield, La Grange Park, La Grange, and Western Springs.

Ford was a candidate for Mayor of Chicago in the 2019 election. In 2026, he was elected to the United States House of Representatives as the Democratic nominee in Illinois's 7th congressional district.

== Early life, education, and career ==
Ford was born February 28, 1972, in Chicago's Cabrini–Green housing project. He grew up in the Austin community of Chicago, having moved there when he was two years old. Ford never met his father. His mother was an unwed teen, and he was adopted by his grandmother at birth.

Ford attended Lady Help of Christians Catholic Elementary School and graduated from Weber High School.

Initially, after high school, Ford attended the Niles College Seminary contemplating becoming a priest. Ford ultimately received a bachelor of arts in elementary education with a minor in political science from Loyola University Chicago. He played basketball while at Loyola. He also attended the University of Illinois, Chicago.

Ford became a history teacher and basketball coach for Chicago Public Schools at Bridge Elementary School on the northwest side. Later he became a licensed Illinois real estate broker, and became the founder of Ford Desired Real Estate in 2001. He has served as a member of the Chicago and National Association of Realtors, board member of the Austin YMCA, board member of Circle Family Care, board member of the Austin Chamber of Commerce, founding organizer of Zawadi Youth Group, and member of St. Martin de Porres Catholic Church Parish Council and Finance Committee.

Ford worked as a Democratic precinct captain in the neighborhood where he grew up.

== Legislative career ==
Ford was first elected to the Illinois House of Representatives in 2007, defeating incumbent Calvin Giles in the Democratic primary and winning the General Election with 83% of the vote.

Ford is focused on social justice and disparities in employment, education, and the healthcare system. He has worked to foster small business development, improve access to affordable housing, expand veterans' protections, safeguard the environment, and address Illinois' fiscal health. He also advocates for preserving communities, helping ex-offenders re-enter society, and enshrining the right to vote. He created a commission to confront economic problems that plague Black communities as well as the Distressed Counties and Communities Task Force, which finds innovative ways to help people who receive state social services.

Throughout his career, Ford has chaired a number of committees: Appropriations—Higher Education; Financial Institutions, Restorative Justice. Ford's committee assignments are: the Appropriations Committee on Elementary & Secondary Education; Appropriations Committee on Human Services; Insurance: Property & Casualty; Tourism, Hospitality & Craft Industries; and Veterans' Affairs.

Ford is a member of the Medicaid Managed Care Oversight Task Force, which is intended to monitor how the State approaches and manages a new form of health care delivery system based on managed care models, particularly for people with disabilities and the elderly. He is also a member of the Violence Prevention Task Force, which seeks to increase awareness of resources, jobs, and opportunities to prevent violence and to assist violence prevention groups and other social institutions in providing safe places for those at risk of violence.

From 2006 until 2012, Ford had received $16,350 in campaign contributions from labor unions. This included $3,000 from AFL-CIO, $2,650 from AFSCME, $200 from Illinois Education Association; $2,500 from the Illinois Federation of Teachers, $7,000 from the Chicago Teachers Union, $1,000 from Service Employees International Union.

In 2020, Ford voiced support for the abolition of history classes in Illinois schools, claiming that "current history teaching practices overlook the contributions by Women and members of the Black, Jewish, LGBTQ communities and other groups" and "until a suitable alternative is developed, we should instead devote greater attention toward civics and ensuring students understand our democratic processes and how they can be involved".

As of July 2, 2022, Representative Ford is a member of the following Illinois House committees:

- (Chairman of) Appropriations - Higher Education Committee (HAPI)
- Fair Lending and Community Reinvestment Subcommittee (HFIN-FAIR)
- Financial Institutions Committee (HFIN)
- Labor & Commerce Committee (HLBR)
- Public Utilities Committee (HPUB)
- Restorative Justice Committee (SHRJ)

Ford also identifies himself as a firm believer in the power of responsible parenting and helped grow the Illinois Council on Responsible Fatherhood, which aims to support fathers and help them to become more responsible and present. He consistently advocates for increased access to financial resources and institutions for marginalized communities and promotes the value of education among students in his district.

== 2019 mayoral campaign ==
Ford ran for mayor of Chicago in 2019. After giving notice of a possible candidacy in late-September, Ford officially announced his candidacy on October 31, 2018, joining what was an already-crowded field of candidates seeking to replace Rahm Emanuel, who had announced in early September that he would not seek reelection.

Candidate Willie Wilson challenged signatures on Ford's candidature petition, but the Chicago Board of Elections allowed Ford to remain on the ballot, finding that, "candidate Willie Wilson's objection to his petitions was not made in good faith."

In the polls he was included in, Ford never placed higher than 2%, and most frequently received around 1% support.

Ford placed eleventh out of fourteen candidates, receiving 5,606 votes (1.01% of the overall vote) in the initial round of the election.

== 2026 U.S. House campaign ==
On May 21, 2025, Ford filed paperwork with the Federal Election Commission to run for Illinois's 7th congressional district, currently represented by Danny Davis, in 2026. On July 31, Davis announced his retirement and endorsed Ford as his successor.

== Personal life ==
Ford has a daughter. He is Catholic.

=== Legal issues ===
On November 29, 2012, Ford was indicted on charges of bank fraud, alleging he provided misleading evidence to obtain a $500,000 extension on a line of credit. The charges state he used the money for personal expenses rather than rehabilitating an owned property, as stated in the loan documentation. On August 4, 2014, all 17 felony counts of bank fraud and false information against Ford were dropped by federal prosecutors in exchange for his pleading guilty to a single misdemeanor income tax charge, and Ford's trial was removed from the federal docket.

== Electoral history ==
Illinois 8th Representative District Democratic Primary, 2006
Party	Candidate	Votes	%
Democratic	La Shawn K. Ford	8,241	52.81
Democratic	Calvin Giles (incumbent)	6,104	39.12
Democratic	Glenn L. Harris	1,260	8.07
Total votes		15,605	100.0

Illinois 8th Representative District General Election, 2006
Party	Candidate	Votes	%
Democratic	La Shawn K. Ford	21,057	83.60
Republican	Glenn L. Harris	2,975	11.81
Green	Nathan Paul Helsabeck	1,157	4.59
Total votes		25,189	100.0

Illinois 8th Representative District Democratic Primary, 2008
Party	Candidate	Votes	%
Democratic	La Shawn K. Ford (incumbent)	18,724	100.0
Total votes		18,724	100.0

Illinois 8th Representative District General Election, 2008
Party	Candidate	Votes	%	±%
Democratic	La Shawn K. Ford (incumbent)	34,666	100.0	+16.40%
Total votes		34,666	100.0	

Illinois 8th Representative District Democratic Primary, 2010
Party	Candidate	Votes	%
Democratic	La Shawn K. Ford (incumbent)	10,355	100.0
Total votes		10,355	100.0

Illinois 8th Representative District General Election, 2010
Party	Candidate	Votes	%
Democratic	La Shawn K. Ford (incumbent)	23,179	100.00
Total votes		23,179	100

Illinois 8th Representative District Democratic Primary, 2012
Party	Candidate	Votes	%
Democratic	La Shawn K. Ford (incumbent)	8,889	100.0
Total votes		8,889	100.0

Illinois 8th Representative District General Election, 2012
Party	Candidate	Votes	%	
Democratic	La Shawn K. Ford (incumbent)	37,824	99.97	−0.03%
Write-in		10	0.03	N/A
Total votes		37,834	100.0	

Illinois 8th Representative District Democratic Primary, 2014
Party	Candidate	Votes	%
Democratic	La Shawn K. Ford (incumbent)	6,340	100.0
Total votes		6,340	100.0

Illinois 8th Representative District General Election, 2014
Party	Candidate	Votes	%	
Democratic	La Shawn K. Ford (incumbent)	25,449	100.0	+0.03%
Total votes		25,449	100.0	

Illinois 8th Representative District Democratic Primary, 2016
Party	Candidate	Votes	%
Democratic	La Shawn K. Ford (incumbent)	24,131	100.0
Total votes		24,131	100.0

Illinois 8th Representative District General Election, 2016
Party	Candidate	Votes	%
Democratic	La Shawn K. Ford (incumbent)	38,493	100.0
Total votes		38,493	100.0

Illinois 8th Representative District Democratic Primary, 2018
Party	Candidate	Votes	%
Democratic	La Shawn K. Ford (incumbent)	15,419	100.0
Total votes		15,419	100.0

Illinois 8th Representative District General Election, 2018
Party	Candidate	Votes	%
Democratic	La Shawn K. Ford (incumbent)	31,923	100.0
Total votes		31,923	100.0

2019 Chicago mayoral election
Candidate	General Election		Run-off Election	
Candidate	Votes	%	Votes	%
Lori Lightfoot	97,667	17.54	386,039	73.70
Toni Preckwinkle	89,343	16.04	137,765	26.30
William Daley	82,294	14.78		
Willie Wilson	59,072	10.61		
Susana Mendoza	50,373	9.05		
Amara Enyia	44,589	8.00		
Jerry Joyce	40,099	7.20		
Gery Chico	34,521	6.20		
Paul Vallas	30,236	5.43		
Garry McCarthy	14,784	2.66		
La Shawn K. Ford	5,606	1.01		
Robert "Bob" Fioretti	4,302	0.77		
John Kolzar	2,349	0.42		
Neal Sales-Griffin	1,523	0.27		
Write-ins	86	0.02		
Total	556,844	100	523,804	100

Illinois 8th Representative District Democratic Primary, 2020
Party	Candidate	Votes	%
Democratic	La Shawn K. Ford (incumbent)	18,036	100.0
Total votes		18,036	100.0

Illinois 8th Representative District General Election, 2020
Party	Candidate	Votes	%
Democratic	La Shawn K. Ford (incumbent)	36,932	100.0
Total votes		36,932	100.0

2022 Illinois 8th Representative District General Election, 2022
Party	Candidate	Votes	%
Democratic	La Shawn K. Ford (incumbent)	22,187	75.51
Republican	Thomas Hurley	7,195	24.49
Total votes		29,382	100.0

U.S. House of Representatives
Preceded by Danny Davis	Member of the U.S. House of Representatives from Illinois's 7th congressional district Taking office 2027	Elect
