= Lynn Brenne =

American politician and businessman

Lynn G. Brenne (October 3, 1911 – February 5, 1993) was an American politician and businessman.

Brenne was born in Cleveland, Ohio. He went to Cleveland College, Yale College, and the Freight Traffic Institute of Chicago. Brenne moved to Illinois in 1936 and settled in Park Forest, Illinois in 1949. He served in the United States Army Air Forces during World War II and was a radar officer. Brenne worked for the Greyhound Corporation and the United Airlines. Brenne served on the Park Forest Village Board and was involved with the Republican Party. He served in the Illinois House of Representatives in 1971 and 1972. Brenne died at his home in Park Forest, Illinois.
