= Robert LeFlore =

American politician

Robert LeFlore Jr. (January 6, 1931 – May 3, 1993) was an American social worker and a politician.

== Life ==
Born in Carrollton, Mississippi in 1931, LeFlore attended local schools. He served in the United States Army from 1951 to 1963, beginning during the Korean War. He lived in Chicago, Illinois, where his family had moved in the Great Migration.

After his Army service, LeFlore worked for a time as a precision grinder. But in his off hours, he organized block clubs and youth groups in his West Chicago community. Noticed by leaders of the Conference on Religion and Race, LeFlore was picked to lead the Lawndale office of the 1960s Tri-Faith jobs project. By 1968 he was chosen as director of job development and operations for Tri-Faith, which placed about 1500 people per month in jobs.

He studied at Governors State University, aided by the GI Bill. Afterward he worked for 19 years as a community resource specialist for the state Department of Human Resources, continuing to aid people in the community.

Elected to the Illinois General Assembly in 1982 from the West Side of Chicago, LeFlore began serving in the Illinois House of Representatives as a Democrat in 1983. His office was at 5947 W. Chicago Avenue. Elected to eleven terms, he served as chairman of the Human Services Appropriations Committee. He was also a member of the Insurance Committee and the Committees on Elementary and Secondary Education, among others. Colleague and longtime friend Rep. Arthur Turner (D-Chicago) said that LeFlore had worked consistently for children and seniors.

LeFlore was repeatedly re-elected from his district and was in his 11th term when he died at the Northwestern University Hospital in Chicago from a long illness. He and his wife Barbara had three children, a son and two daughters, and four grandchildren. He was also survived by two sisters.

Local Democratic Party leaders selected Calvin Giles to succeed LeFlore in the Illinois House of Representatives.

== Legacy and honors ==
- The Robert LeFlore Jr. Post Office on W. Division Street, Chicago, was named in his honor.
