= New Palestine, Illinois =

- Unincorporated community
- Location within Illinois Location within the United States
- Coordinates: 37°59′47″N 89°49′14″W
- Country: United States
- State: Illinois
- County: Randolph
- Elevation: 581 ft (177 m)
- Time zone: UTC-6 (Central (CST))
  - Summer (DST): UTC-5 (CDT)
- Area code: 618
- GNIS feature ID: 414450

New Palestine is an unincorporated community in Randolph County, Illinois, United States. The community is located at the intersection of County Routes 3 and 1 5.7 miles (9.2 km) north of Chester.
