= Calvin Giles =

American politician

Member of the Illinois House of Representatives
- In office 1993–2007

Personal details
- Born: July 10, 1962 (age 64)
- Party: Democratic Party
- Occupation: Politician

Calvin L. Giles (born July 10, 1962) is an Illinois state politician. He was a Democratic member of the Illinois House of Representatives representing the 8th district from 1993 until 2007. Calvin replaced Robert LeFlore who died in 1993.

== Early life ==
Giles earned his bachelor's degree in management from Northeastern Illinois University. He is also a landscape designer.

== State representative ==
As a member of the Illinois House of Representatives, Giles was on five committees: Elementary and Secondary Education (Chairperson), Financial Institutions, Telecommunications, Tourism and Conventions, and Committee of the Whole. He was defeated for re-election in the Democratic primary on March 21, 2006, by LaShawn Ford.

== Personal life ==
Giles and his wife, Tracey, have one child.
