= Blair, Randolph County, Illinois =

Blair, Illinois
- Unincorporated community
- Location within Illinois Location within the United States
- Coordinates: 38°02′41″N 89°44′31″W
- Country: United States
- State: Illinois
- County: Randolph
- Elevation: 502 ft (153 m)
- Time zone: UTC-6 (Central (CST))
  - Summer (DST): UTC-5 (CDT)
- Area code: 618
- GNIS feature ID: 404539

Blair is an unincorporated community in Randolph County, Illinois, United States. Blair is 5 miles (8.0 km) west-northwest of Steeleville.

The town is named for Thomas Blair, the first postmaster and first justice of the peace. In 1860, a post office was established.
