= Randolph County, Illinois =

County in Illinois, United States

- County
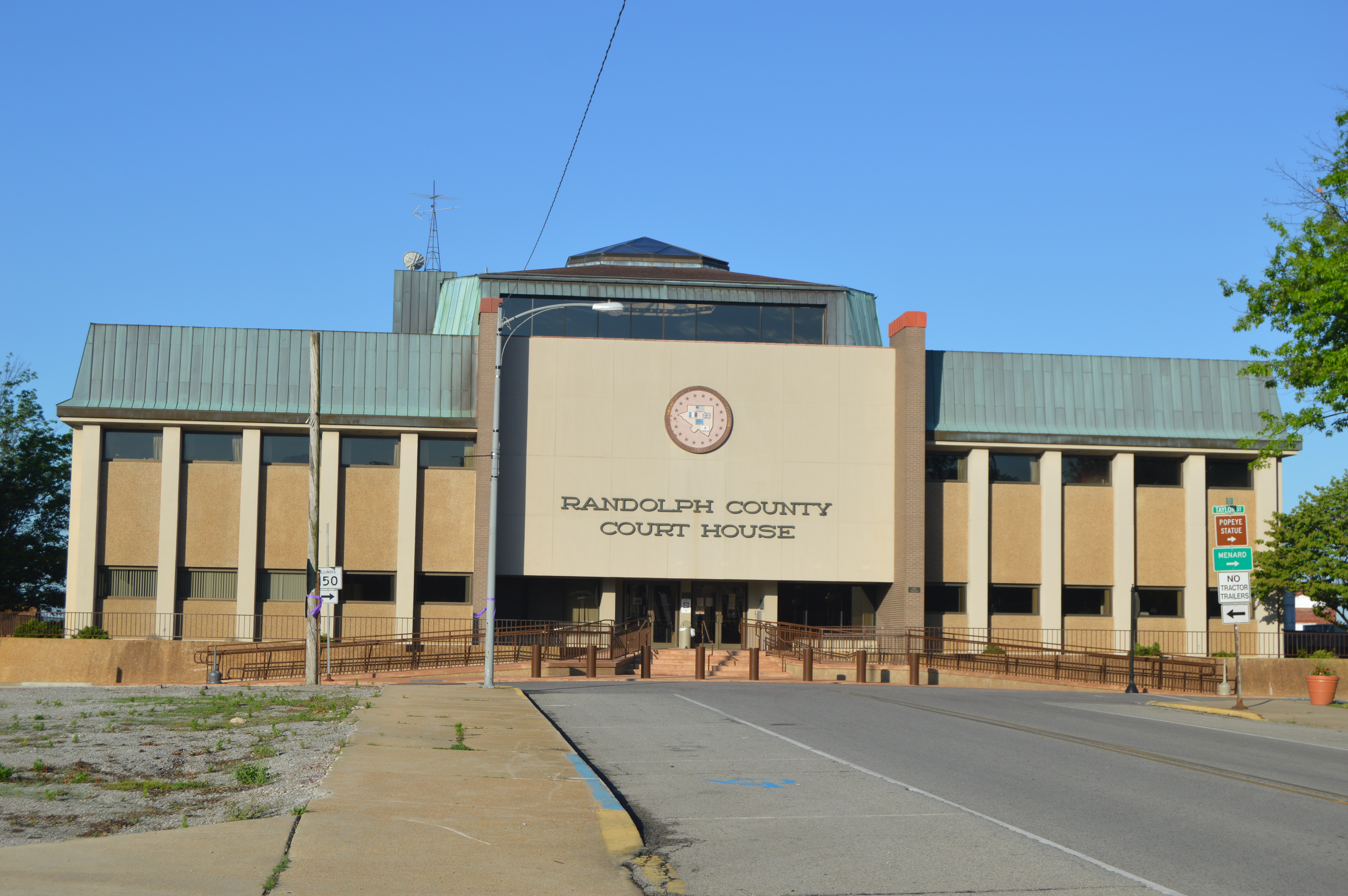
- Randolph County Courthouse in Chester
- Motto: Where Illinois Began
- Location within the U.S. state of Illinois
- Coordinates: 38°03′N 89°49′W
- Country: United States
- State: Illinois
- Founded: 1795
- Named for: Edmund Randolph
- Seat: Chester
- Largest city: Chester

Area
  - Total: 597 sq mi (1,550 km^{2})
  - Land: 576 sq mi (1,490 km^{2})
  - Water: 22 sq mi (57 km^{2}) 3.6%

Population (2020)
  - Total: 30,163
  - Estimate (2025): 29,921 ▼
  - Density: 52.4/sq mi (20.2/km^{2})
- Time zone: UTC−6 (Central)
  - Summer (DST): UTC−5 (CDT)
- Congressional district: 12th
- Website: randolphcountyil.gov

Randolph County is a county located in the U.S. state of Illinois. According to the 2020 census, it had a population of 30,163. Its county seat is Chester.

Owing to its role in the state's history, the county motto is "Where Illinois Began." It contains the historically important village of Kaskaskia, Illinois's first capital, within a portion of the county that lies west of the Mississippi River; most of the county lies east of the river.

The county is part of Southern Illinois in the southern portion of the state known locally as "Little Egypt", and includes fertile river flats, part of the American Bottom; it is near the Greater St. Louis area.

== History ==
Randolph County, organized in 1795, was the second county formed in what ultimately became the state of Illinois, but which was then Illinois Territory after Virginia and Pennsylvania ceded their land claims and the Continental Congress passed the Northwest Ordinance on July 13, 1787. St. Clair County to the north had been formed in 1790 after adoption of the U.S. Constitution, and named after the first Territorial Governor, General Arthur St. Clair, who before his federal appointment, had resided in Pennsylvania. Its name honored former Virginia Governor Edmund Randolph, who as Virginia's governor had ceded that state's land claims allowing the Northwest Ordinance, and later became U.S. Attorney General. General George Rogers Clark and Virginia militiamen with the assistance of Chief Jean Baptiste De Coigne had captured the area from the British on July 4, 1778, near the end of the Revolutionary War. Virginia then administered the vast area, which it had called Illinois County, Virginia after the populated areas of Kentucky County, Virginia south of the Ohio River were admitted to the union as the state of Kentucky, which allowed slavery. However, slavery was not permitted in the Northwest Territory. Moreover, exposure to European diseases, as well as conflict, had decimated the indigenous peoples of the area. After more heavily settled areas in the east had formed first the State of Ohio, the remaining area became the Indiana Territory, and in 1803 territorial governor William Henry Harrison (of a distinguished Virginia family who later became U.S. President) signed a treaty with Chief Jean Baptiste De Coigne representing the Kaskaskia and allied indigenous peoples. After Congress admitted the State of Indiana the remaining land east of the Mississippi had become the Illinois Territory. In 1809 its first Territorial Secretary, former Kentuckian Nathaniel Pope, in his capacity as acting governor, issued a proclamation establishing Randolph as one of the Illinois' two original counties. The county's boundaries were last changed in 1827, when land to the east formed Perry County.

The Mississippi River has played a prominent role in the county's history. The first two capitals of Illinois were Cahokia (declared a town by George Rogers Clark) and Kaskaskia (also captured by Clark and which became the Randolph County seat), and both nearly abandoned after course alterations. In 1881, the flooding Mississippi severed the isthmus that connected Kaskaskia to the Illinois mainland, destroying the original village of and forcing its historic cemetery to be relocated across the river to Fort Kaskaskia. Crains Island, southeast of Chester, is another enclave of Illinois west of the Mississippi that was created by a change in the river's course.

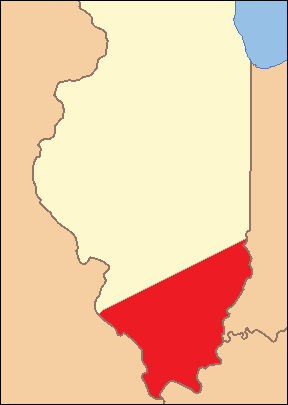
Randolph County as it was re-established in 1809. This diagonal border line had been drawn by the Indiana Territorial government in 1803.

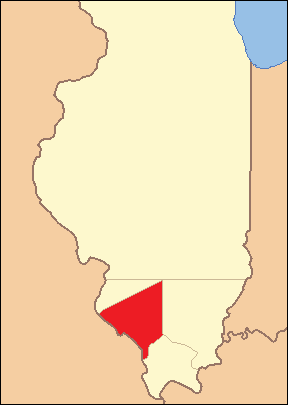
Randolph County between 1812 and 1813

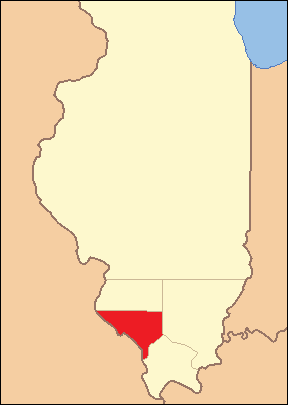
Randolph County between 1813 and 1816

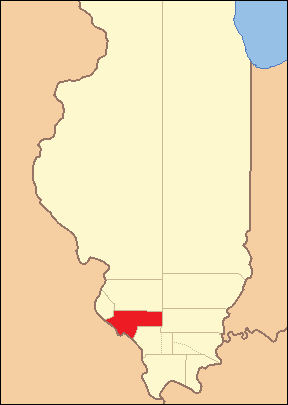
Randolph County between 1816 and 1827

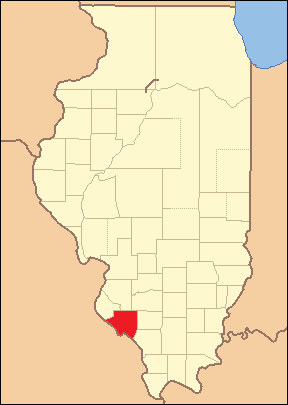
Randolph County in 1827, reduced to its existing borders

== Geography ==
According to the U.S. Census Bureau, the county has a total area of 597 square miles (1,550 km^{2}), of which 576 square miles (1,490 km^{2}) is land and 22 square miles (57 km^{2}) (3.6%) is water.

The Kaskaskia River flows into the Mississippi River in Randolph County. At this point the Mississippi, which usually defines the border between Illinois and Missouri, is entirely in Illinois. The Mississippi changed its course in the late-nineteenth century, leaving Kaskaskia, the former state capital, on the west side of the river. The boundary of the State, however, follows the old course of the river, leaving Illinois with an exclave on the western shore of the Mississippi River. A smaller enclave, Crains Island, is a few miles further down the river.

=== Climate and weather ===
Chester, Illinois

Climate chart (precipitation, max. and min. temperature)
J	F	M	A	M	J	J	A	S	O	N	D
1.9 39 22	2 46 26	3.5 56 35	3.4 68 45	4.3 78 54	3.9 87 64	3.8 91 68	3.4 89 66	3.2 82 58	3.1 71 46	4.2 56 36	3.2 44 27
- █ Average max. and min. temperatures in °F
- █ Precipitation totals in inches
- Source: The Weather Channel
Metric conversion
J	F	M	A	M	J	J	A	S	O	N	D
47 4 −6	51 8 −3	89 13 2	87 20 7	109 26 12	98 31 18	96 33 20	86 32 19	81 28 14	78 22 8	106 13 2	80 7 −3
- █ Average max. and min. temperatures in °C
- █ Precipitation totals in mm

In recent years, average temperatures in the county seat of Chester have ranged from a low of 22 °F (−6 °C) in January to a high of 91 °F (33 °C) in July, although a record low of −18 °F (−28 °C) was recorded in January 1985 and a record high of 113 °F (45 °C) was recorded in July 2012. Average monthly precipitation ranged from 1.85 inches (47 mm) in January to 4.30 inches (109 mm) in May.

=== Major highways ===
- Illinois Route 3
- Illinois Route 4
- Illinois Route 13
- Illinois Route 150
- Illinois Route 153
- Illinois Route 154
- Illinois Route 155
- Illinois Route 159

=== Adjacent counties ===
- Monroe County (northwest)
- St. Clair County (north)
- Washington County (northeast)
- Perry County (east)
- Jackson County (southeast)
- Perry County, Missouri (south)
- Ste. Genevieve County, Missouri (southwest)

Randolph County is among the few counties in the United States to border two counties with the same name (Perry County in Missouri and Illinois).

== Demographics ==
Historical population
Census	Pop.	Note	%±
1820	3,492		—
1830	4,429		26.8%
1840	7,944		79.4%
1850	11,079		39.5%
1860	17,205		55.3%
1870	20,859		21.2%
1880	25,690		23.2%
1890	25,049		−2.5%
1900	28,001		11.8%
1910	29,120		4.0%
1920	29,109		0.0%
1930	29,313		0.7%
1940	33,608		14.7%
1950	31,673		−5.8%
1960	29,988		−5.3%
1970	31,379		4.6%
1980	35,652		13.6%
1990	34,583		−3.0%
2000	33,893		−2.0%
2010	33,476		−1.2%
2020	30,163		−9.9%
2025 (est.)	29,921	▼	−0.8%
U.S. Decennial Census; 1790–1960 1900–1990; 1990–2000 2010–20132020 United States census

=== 2020 census ===
As of the 2020 census, the county had a population of 30,163. The median age was 43.1 years. 19.8% of residents were under the age of 18 and 20.3% of residents were 65 years of age or older. For every 100 females there were 113.4 males, and for every 100 females age 18 and over there were 115.9 males age 18 and over.

The racial makeup of the county was 85.0% White, 7.9% Black or African American, 0.2% American Indian and Alaska Native, 0.3% Asian, <0.1% Native Hawaiian and Pacific Islander, 2.3% from some other race, and 4.3% from two or more races. Hispanic or Latino residents of any race comprised 3.4% of the population.

21.0% of residents lived in urban areas, while 79.0% lived in rural areas.

There were 11,693 households in the county, of which 27.4% had children under the age of 18 living in them. Of all households, 48.7% were married-couple households, 18.4% were households with a male householder and no spouse or partner present, and 26.0% were households with a female householder and no spouse or partner present. About 30.2% of all households were made up of individuals and 14.7% had someone living alone who was 65 years of age or older.

There were 13,373 housing units, of which 12.6% were vacant. Among occupied housing units, 76.1% were owner-occupied and 23.9% were renter-occupied. The homeowner vacancy rate was 2.4% and the rental vacancy rate was 7.8%.

=== Racial and ethnic composition ===
Randolph County, Illinois – Racial and ethnic composition Note: the US Census treats Hispanic/Latino as an ethnic category. This table excludes Latinos from the racial categories and assigns them to a separate category. Hispanics/Latinos may be of any race.
Race / Ethnicity (NH = Non-Hispanic)	Pop 1980	Pop 1990	Pop 2000	Pop 2010	Pop 2020	% 1980	% 1990	% 2000	% 2010	% 2020
White alone (NH)	33,022	31,243	29,860	28,933	25,460	92.62%	90.34%	88.10%	86.43%	84.41%
Black or African American alone (NH)	2,261	2,844	3,132	3,245	2,381	6.34%	8.22%	9.24%	9.69%	7.89%
Native American or Alaska Native alone (NH)	37	53	43	43	48	0.10%	0.15%	0.13%	0.13%	0.16%
Asian alone (NH)	51	83	81	102	86	0.14%	0.24%	0.24%	0.30%	0.29%
Native Hawaiian or Pacific Islander alone (NH)	x	x	8	9	7	x	x	0.02%	0.03%	0.02%
Other race alone (NH)	52	15	5	15	72	0.15%	0.04%	0.01%	0.04%	0.24%
Mixed race or Multiracial (NH)	x	x	243	262	1,078	x	x	0.72%	0.78%	3.57%
Hispanic or Latino (any race)	229	345	521	867	1,031	0.64%	1.00%	1.54%	2.59%	3.42%
Total	35,652	34,583	33,893	33,476	30,163	100.00%	100.00%	100.00%	100.00%	100.00%

=== 2010 census ===
As of the 2010 United States census, there were 33,476 people, 12,314 households, and 8,188 families residing in the county. The population density was 58.2 inhabitants per square mile (22.5/km^{2}). There were 13,707 housing units at an average density of 23.8 per square mile (9.2/km^{2}). The racial makeup of the county was 87.6% white, 9.7% black or African American, 0.3% Asian, 0.2% American Indian, 1.2% from other races, and 0.9% from two or more races. Those of Hispanic or Latino origin made up 2.6% of the population. In terms of ancestry, 40.3% were German, 11.3% were Irish, 9.4% were English, and 5.7% were American.

Of the 12,314 households, 29.1% had children under the age of 18 living with them, 52.0% were married couples living together, 10.1% had a female householder with no husband present, 33.5% were non-families, and 28.9% of all households were made up of individuals. The average household size was 2.37 and the average family size was 2.90. The median age was 41.0 years.

The median income for a household in the county was $45,020 and the median income for a family was $55,113. Males had a median income of $43,359 versus $28,376 for females. The per capita income for the county was $19,950. About 7.0% of families and 10.4% of the population were below the poverty line, including 11.9% of those under age 18 and 9.9% of those age 65 or over.

== Government and infrastructure ==
The Illinois Department of Corrections Menard Correctional Center is located in Chester. Prior to the January 11, 2003, commutation of death row sentences, male death row inmates were housed in Menard, Tamms, and Pontiac correctional centers. After that date, only Pontiac continued to host the male death row.

== Politics ==
Randolph is a rural conservative county in southern Illinois that has trended Republican since 2000 in presidential elections.

United States presidential election results for Randolph County, Illinois
Year	Republican		Democratic		Third party(ies)	
Year	No.	%	No.	%	No.	%
1892	2,425	43.87%	2,702	48.88%	401	7.25%
1896	3,024	48.55%	3,081	49.46%	124	1.99%
1900	3,045	47.07%	3,278	50.67%	146	2.26%
1904	3,238	52.17%	2,518	40.57%	451	7.27%
1908	3,045	47.04%	3,172	49.00%	256	3.95%
1912	1,169	18.31%	3,217	50.38%	2,000	31.32%
1916	5,517	49.06%	5,403	48.04%	326	2.90%
1920	6,180	62.54%	3,181	32.19%	521	5.27%
1924	4,527	41.61%	3,734	34.32%	2,619	24.07%
1928	5,739	47.46%	6,251	51.69%	103	0.85%
1932	4,747	34.78%	8,634	63.27%	266	1.95%
1936	7,057	44.95%	8,247	52.53%	397	2.53%
1940	9,333	54.21%	7,802	45.32%	80	0.46%
1944	7,518	54.65%	6,199	45.06%	39	0.28%
1948	6,867	49.83%	6,852	49.72%	62	0.45%
1952	8,427	54.59%	6,998	45.33%	13	0.08%
1956	8,439	55.44%	6,778	44.53%	4	0.03%
1960	7,988	52.05%	7,344	47.85%	15	0.10%
1964	5,803	38.68%	9,199	61.32%	0	0.00%
1968	7,681	50.37%	5,953	39.04%	1,616	10.60%
1972	9,761	60.20%	6,440	39.72%	14	0.09%
1976	8,190	48.07%	8,693	51.02%	155	0.91%
1980	8,810	56.86%	6,052	39.06%	632	4.08%
1984	9,415	59.48%	6,355	40.15%	59	0.37%
1988	7,396	48.28%	7,844	51.21%	78	0.51%
1992	4,899	29.57%	8,529	51.49%	3,137	18.94%
1996	5,422	37.02%	7,419	50.65%	1,806	12.33%
2000	7,127	49.88%	6,794	47.55%	366	2.56%
2004	8,076	54.00%	6,771	45.27%	109	0.73%
2008	7,538	49.59%	7,395	48.64%	269	1.77%
2012	8,290	57.42%	5,759	39.89%	389	2.69%
2016	10,023	70.61%	3,439	24.23%	732	5.16%
2020	11,076	74.29%	3,592	24.09%	242	1.62%
2024	10,624	73.92%	3,461	24.08%	288	2.00%

== Media ==
There are two AM radio stations licensed in the county — WHCO 1230AM in Sparta and KSGM 980AM in Chester.

Weekly newspapers in the county are The Randolph County Herald Tribune located in Chester, The County Journal, which is based in Percy and also covers Perry and Jackson Counties, the North County News in Red Bud, and the Sparta News-Plaindealer.

The area is also served by the on-line newspaper based in Chester which is SunTimesNews.com

== Communities ==
=== Cities ===
- Chester
- Red Bud
- Sparta

=== Villages ===
- Baldwin
- Coulterville
- Ellis Grove
- Evansville
- Kaskaskia
- Percy
- Prairie du Rocher
- Rockwood
- Ruma
- Steeleville
- Tilden

=== Unincorporated communities ===
- Blair
- Bremen
- Dozaville
- Eden
- Fort Gage
- Houston
- Leanderville
- Marigold
- Menard
- Modoc
- New Palestine
- Prairie
- Preston
- Schuline
- Shiloh Hill
- Walsh
- Welge
- Wine Hill

=== Forts ===
- Fort de Chartres

== See also ==
- National Register of Historic Places listings in Randolph County, Illinois
