= Evansville, Illinois =

Evansville
- Village
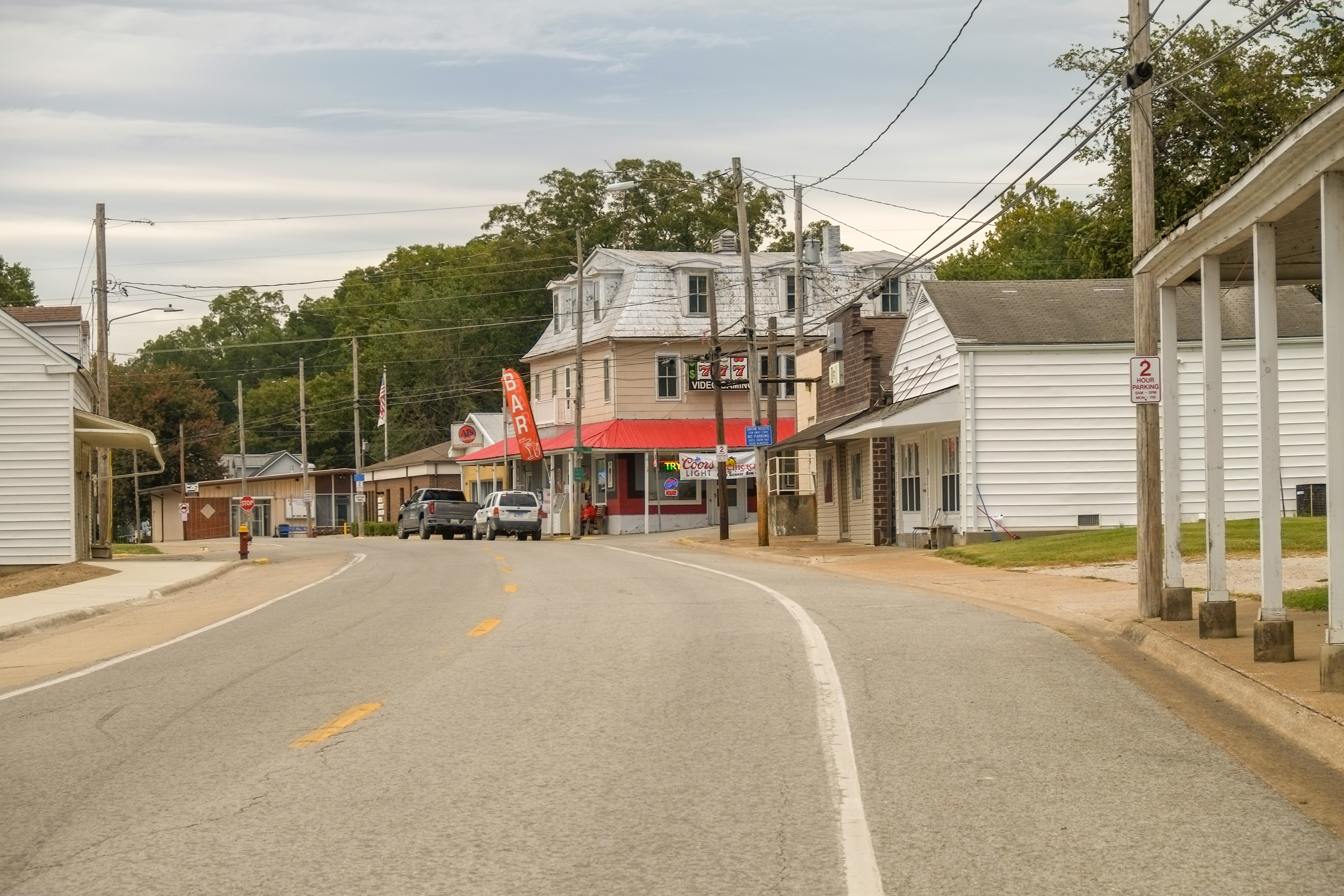
- Evansville street view

- Location of Evansville in Randolph County, Illinois.
- Coordinates: 38°05′20″N 89°55′56″W
- Country: United States
- State: Illinois
- County: Randolph
- Founded: 1834
- Founder: Cadwell Evans

Government
  - Mayor: Kenny Kempfer

Area
  - Total: 0.81 sq mi (2.11 km^{2})
  - Land: 0.79 sq mi (2.04 km^{2})
  - Water: 0.027 sq mi (0.07 km^{2})
- Elevation: 456 ft (139 m)

Population (2020)
  - Total: 547
  - Density: 693.8/sq mi (267.89/km^{2})
- Time zone: UTC-6 (CST)
  - Summer (DST): UTC-5 (CDT)
- ZIP code: 62242
- Area code: 618
- FIPS code: 17-24608
- GNIS ID: 2398844
- Website: evansvilleil.org

Evansville is a village in Randolph County, Illinois, United States, on the banks of the Kaskaskia River. The population was 547 at the 2020 census.

== History ==
The early history of Evansville, Illinois, dates back to 1811, when Andrew White identified the area along the eastern side of the Kaskaskia River as a suitable location for establishing a town. The development of the settlement during the following two decades is largely undocumented. In 1834, Cadwell Evans surveyed and divided a portion of the area into streets and lots, establishing the foundation of the present-day village.

=== The Kaskaskia River ===
The Kaskaskia River has been an important part of Evansville's economic development and history. Over the years, it served as a transportation route for local businesses, including the Sauer Milling Company, which shipped flour and grain to markets along the Mississippi River. The former milling operation eventually sold to Farm Service, now known as Gateway FS. Following improvements to the lower river channel in the early 1970s, barge transportation became more common, allowing agricultural products to reach larger markets. The river also developed into a popular recreational area, with a public boat launch that was expanded in 1986. Today, visitors use the river for boating, fishing, swimming, water skiing, and camping, bringing additional activity to the village and surrounding businesses.

==== Flooding ====
The village has experienced several significant floods from the Kaskaskia River throughout its history, with the most severe occurring in 1943,1973, and 1993. These events resulted in extensive flooding throughout the area, affecting numerous homes and businesses and causing considerable property damage. Of the three, the 1993 flood is recorded as the most destructive, with the highest water level and causing widespread damage to the village and surrounding areas.

=== The Railroad ===
The development of the railroad service brought new economic opportunities to Evansville during the late 19th century. In 1849, the Centralia and Chester Railroad was extended from Sparta to Evansville, with the line eventually reaching Chester in 1898. The railroad provided local business with improved access to outside markets and made it easier to transport agricultural products, particularly grain and flour. This helped support the growth of local milling companies and strengthened Evansville's role in the region's agricultural economy.

=== The Sauer Family and Milling Industry ===
The Sauer family played an important role in Evansville's development, particularly through its involvement in the local milling industry. In 1866, Phillip Sauer and his son Nicholas purchased the flour mill previously operated by John Wehrheim and established the N. & P. Milling Company. The mill became one of the first in Southern Illinois to adopt the roller milling process, allowing it to expand production. For many years, the business was a major employer in the area and contributed significantly to Evansville's economy. Flour produced at the mill was transported by river and railroad to markets throughout the region and beyond. In 1899, the business became known as the Sauer Milling Company under Nicholas Sauer's ownership. The company eventually ceased operations, and the property was sold to Farm Service, which is present day Gateway FS, continuing the site's connection to the agricultural industry. The Sauer family also left a lasting mark on the community through its contributions to local institutions and the establishment of a private family cemetery in the village.

== Geography ==
According to the 2010 census, Evansville has a total area of 0.817 square miles (2.12 km^{2}), of which 0.79 square miles (2.05 km^{2}) (or 96.7%) is land and 0.027 square miles (0.07 km^{2}) (or 3.3%) is water.

== Demographics ==
Historical population
Census	Pop.	Note	%±
1880	321		—
1890	407		26.8%
1900	663		62.9%
1910	562		−15.2%
1920	575		2.3%
1930	543		−5.6%
1940	693		27.6%
1950	821		18.5%
1960	846		3.0%
1970	838		−0.9%
1980	863		3.0%
1990	844		−2.2%
2000	724		−14.2%
2010	701		−3.2%
2020	547		−22.0%
U.S. Decennial Census

As of the census of 2000, there were 724 people, 298 households, and 191 families residing in the village. The population density was 976.9 inhabitants per square mile (377.2/km^{2}). There were 317 housing units at an average density of 427.7 units per square mile (165.1 units/km^{2}). The racial makeup of the village was 98.90% White, 0.41% African American, 0.14% Asian, 0.28% Pacific Islander, and 0.28% from two or more races. Hispanic or Latino of any race were 0.69% of the population.

There were 298 households, out of which 29.5% had children under the age of 18 living with them, 50.0% were married couples living together, 8.1% had a female householder with no husband present, and 35.6% were non-families. 31.2% of all households were made up of individuals, and 16.4% had someone living alone who was 65 years of age or older. The average household size was 2.38 and the average family size was 3.01.

In the village, the population was spread out, with 24.9% under the age of 18, 5.7% from 18 to 24, 29.1% from 25 to 44, 21.3% from 45 to 64, and 19.1% who were 65 years of age or older. The median age was 37 years. For every 100 females, there were 93.1 males. For every 100 females age 18 and over, there were 92.9 males.

The median income for a household in the village was $32,292, and the median income for a family was $41,719. Males had a median income of $32,500 versus $20,208 for females. The per capita income for the village was $20,194. About 7.0% of families and 14.0% of the population were below the poverty line, including 25.3% of those under age 18 and 5.4% of those age 65 or over.

== Government ==
As of 2025, the town's government is made up of Kenneth Kempfer, President, Board of Trustees; Bethany Wunderlich, Village Clerk; Denise Holmes, Treasurer; Lori Valleroy, Collector; Mike Hanna, Fire Chief; Jean Dobbs, Librarian; Mark McConachie, Zoning Administrator; and Ed Braun, Superintendent.

== Education ==
Evansville has one public elementary school for grades K-8, Evansville Attendance Center(EAC), and is located in the Sparta Community Unit School District 140. It also provides two public libraries, Evansville Public Library in Village Hall and Central Public Library located in the school, EAC.

== Churches ==
There are four churches located in Evansville. These Churches consist of Light House Pentecostal Church, St. Boniface Catholic Church, St. Peter's Lutheran Church, and United Church of Christ.

== Notable person ==
- Roger Wolff, pitcher for the Philadelphia Athletics, Washington Senators, Cleveland Indians and Pittsburgh Pirates
