= Lake City, Illinois =

- Census-designated place
- Location within Illinois Location within the United States
- Coordinates: 39°45′06″N 88°43′06″W
- Country: United States
- State: Illinois
- County: Moultrie
- Township: Dora

Area
  - Total: 0.39 sq mi (1.00 km^{2})
  - Land: 0.39 sq mi (1.00 km^{2})
  - Water: 0 sq mi (0.00 km^{2})
- Elevation: 686 ft (209 m)

Population (2020)
  - Total: 69
  - Density: 178.2/sq mi (68.82/km^{2})
- Time zone: UTC-6 (Central (CST))
  - Summer (DST): UTC-5 (CDT)
- ZIP Code: 61937
- Area code: 217
- GNIS feature ID: 2806515
- FIPS Code: 17-41040

Lake City is an unincorporated community and census-designated place (CDP) in Moultrie County, Illinois, United States. As of the 2020 United States census, it had a population of 69.

== Geography ==
Lake City is in northwestern Moultrie County along Illinois Route 32, which forms the northeast edge of the community. IL 32 leads 5.5 miles (8.9 km) southeast to Lovington and 15 miles (24 km) to Sullivan, the county seat, while to the north it leads 2.5 miles (4.0 km) to U.S. Route 36 at La Place. Decatur is 16 miles (26 km) northwest of Lake City.

According to the U.S. Census Bureau, the Lake City CDP has an area of 0.39 square miles (1.01 km^{2}), all land. The community is in the drainage area of Stringtown Branch, which flows southeast to the West Okaw River, part of the Kaskaskia River watershed.

== Demographics ==
Historical population
Census	Pop.	Note	%±
2020	69		—
U.S. Decennial Census

Lake City first appeared as a census designated place in the 2020 U.S. census.
