= Arthur, Illinois =

- Village
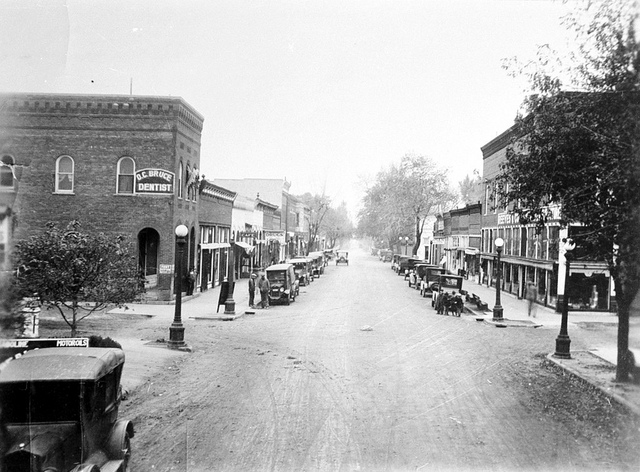
- Arthur in 1924

- Location in Moultrie County, Illinois
- Coordinates: 39°42′52″N 88°28′11″W
- Country: United States
- State: Illinois
- Counties: Douglas, Moultrie
- Townships: Bourbon, Lowe

Area
  - Total: 1.34 sq mi (3.46 km^{2})
  - Land: 1.34 sq mi (3.46 km^{2})
  - Water: 0 sq mi (0.00 km^{2})
- Elevation: 663 ft (202 m)

Population (2020)
  - Total: 2,231
  - Density: 1,669.2/sq mi (644.48/km^{2})
- Time zone: UTC-6 (CST)
  - Summer (DST): UTC-5 (CDT)
- ZIP code: 61911
- Area code(s): 217, 447
- FIPS code: 17-02414
- GNIS ID: 2397993
- Website: www.arthur-il.gov

Arthur is a village in Douglas and Moultrie counties in Illinois, with Arthur's primary street, Vine Street, being the county line. The population was 2,231 at the 2020 census. The Arthur area is home to the largest and oldest Amish community in Illinois, which was founded in the 1860s.

== History ==
In 1877, the population was approximately 300 people. The community was incorporated as a village in April of that year.

The first village election was held on June 12, 1877, and C. G. McComb, Matt Hunsaker, W. H. Reeder, H. C. Jones, J. W. Sears, and Nick Thompson were elected trustees, and J. W. Barrum, clerk.

The original town was laid out on the farms of M. H. Warren on the Moultrie County side and the Pendleton Murphy farm on the Douglas County side. Early additions to the town included those by Murphy, Reeves, Hunsaker, Gibson, Warren, Reeder, followed by Kensington, Campbell, Boyd, Bennet, Fitzjarrald, and others.

On April 7, 1998, an F2 tornado struck 2 miles (3 km) south of Cadwell and moved northeast 4 miles (6 km) to south of Arthur. It lifted near Bourbon. Twenty homes, six barns, and other buildings were either damaged or destroyed. One mobile home was blown off its foundation. There were eight injuries.

In 2022, the community council revealed a flag for the village to celebrate its sesquicentennial. The new flag is flown in front of the welcome center and the police department. The new flag was put up upon the start of the Strawberry Festival.

On December 31, 2023, the village of Arthur would close a time capsule not set to open until 2073.

== Geography ==
Arthur is in southwestern Douglas County and northeastern Moultrie County, with Illinois Route 133 passing through the southern part of the village, leading east 9 miles (14 km) to Arcola and west the same distance to Lovington. Tuscola, the Douglas county seat, is 15 miles (24 km) to the northeast, while Sullivan, the Moultrie county seat, is the same distance to the southwest.

According to the U.S. Census Bureau, Arthur has a total area of 1.34 square miles (3.47 km^{2}), all land. The village is drained to the southeast by tributaries of the Kaskaskia River.

== Demographics ==
Historical population
Census	Pop.	Note	%±
1880	241		—
1890	536		122.4%
1900	858		60.1%
1910	1,080		25.9%
1920	998		−7.6%
1930	1,361		36.4%
1940	1,405		3.2%
1950	1,573		12.0%
1960	2,120		34.8%
1970	2,214		4.4%
1980	2,122		−4.2%
1990	2,112		−0.5%
2000	2,203		4.3%
2010	2,288		3.9%
2020	2,231		−2.5%
U.S. Decennial Census

=== 2020 census ===
As of the 2020 census, Arthur had a population of 2,231. There were 958 households and 612 families residing in the village. The population density was 1,668.66 inhabitants per square mile (644.27/km^{2}). There were 1,036 housing units at an average density of 774.87 per square mile (299.18/km^{2}).

The median age was 42.3 years. 22.9% of residents were under the age of 18 and 23.6% of residents were 65 years of age or older. For every 100 females there were 92.3 males, and for every 100 females age 18 and over there were 87.7 males age 18 and over.

0.0% of residents lived in urban areas, while 100.0% lived in rural areas.

Among households in Arthur, 26.1% had children under the age of 18 living in them. Of all households, 47.3% were married-couple households, 19.4% were households with a male householder and no spouse or partner present, and 28.0% were households with a female householder and no spouse or partner present. About 34.8% of all households were made up of individuals and 17.8% had someone living alone who was 65 years of age or older.

Of the housing units, 7.5% were vacant. The homeowner vacancy rate was 1.0% and the rental vacancy rate was 7.9%.

Racial composition as of the 2020 census
Race	Number	Percent
White	2,061	92.4%
Black or African American	5	0.2%
American Indian and Alaska Native	5	0.2%
Asian	11	0.5%
Native Hawaiian and Other Pacific Islander	0	0.0%
Some other race	54	2.4%
Two or more races	95	4.3%
Hispanic or Latino (of any race)	134	6.0%

=== Income and poverty ===
The median income for a household in the village was $62,250, and the median income for a family was $79,500. Males had a median income of $45,147 versus $22,105 for females. The per capita income for the village was $29,574. About 8.2% of families and 8.3% of the population were below the poverty line, including 12.3% of those under age 18 and 5.7% of those age 65 or over.

=== Amish community ===
By 1938, Arthur was acknowledged as a speech-island (sprachinsel) of the Pennsylvania German language.

The village of Arthur characterizes itself on its website as an Amish-friendly community, with more than 4,000 "Plain People" living in the region centered on the village. The Amish settlement near Arthur was founded in 1864 and by 2013 had 30 church districts with about 150 people per district. The Arthur community was the eighth largest Amish settlement in the world, with 4,410 as of 2017.

== Education ==
In July 2012, Arthur's longtime school district consolidated with the much smaller school district in nearby Lovington. High school students from both towns attend school in Arthur, while grade schools are maintained in both towns. The two schools have shared a football team for many years. In August 2014, the Atwood Hammond school district consolidated with Arthur Lovington, with the school name being changed to ALAH High School.

== Notable people ==
- Margery C. Carlson, botanist
- George Corbett, NFL running back of the 1930s
