= Bourbon Township, Douglas County, Illinois =

Bourbon Township
- Township
- Location in Douglas County

- Douglas County's location in Illinois
- Coordinates: 39°42′11″N 88°24′51″W
- Country: United States
- State: Illinois
- County: Douglas
- Established: November 5, 1867

Area
  - Total: 43.12 sq mi (111.7 km^{2})
  - Land: 43.11 sq mi (111.7 km^{2})
  - Water: 0.02 sq mi (0.052 km^{2}) 0.04%
- Elevation: 663 ft (202 m)

Population (2020)
  - Total: 4,099
  - Density: 95.08/sq mi (36.71/km^{2})
- Time zone: UTC-6 (CST)
  - Summer (DST): UTC-5 (CDT)
- ZIP codes: 61910, 61911, 61953
- FIPS code: 17-041-07458

Bourbon Township is one of nine townships in Douglas County, Illinois, US. As of the 2020 census its population was 4,099 and it contained 1,402 housing units.

== Geography ==
According to the 2021 census gazetteer files, Bourbon Township has a total area of 43.12 square miles (111.68 km^{2}), of which 43.11 square miles (111.65 km^{2}) (or 99.96%) is land and 0.02 square miles (0.05 km^{2}) (or 0.04%) is water.

=== Cities, towns, villages ===
- Arthur (eastern portion)

=== Unincorporated towns ===
- Bourbon at 39.745588°N 88.378941°W
- Chesterville at 39.703366°N 88.391163°W

=== Extinct towns ===
- Fillmore at 39.713366°N 88.381163°W

(These towns are listed as "historical" by the USGS.)

=== Major highways ===
- Illinois Route 133

== Demographics ==
As of the 2020 census there were 4,099 people, 1,228 households, and 940 families residing in the township. The population density was 95.05 inhabitants per square mile (36.70/km^{2}). There were 1,402 housing units at an average density of 32.51 per square mile (12.55/km^{2}). The racial makeup of the township was 96.34% White, 0.12% African American, 0.29% Native American, 0.15% Asian, 0.02% Pacific Islander, 1.17% from other races, and 1.90% from two or more races. Hispanic or Latino of any race were 3.03% of the population.

There were 1,228 households, out of which 44.90% had children under the age of 18 living with them, 70.36% were married couples living together, 3.09% had a female householder with no spouse present, and 23.45% were non-families. 20.10% of all households were made up of individuals, and 13.00% had someone living alone who was 65 years of age or older. The average household size was 3.31 and the average family size was 3.94.

The township's age distribution consisted of 33.7% under the age of 18, 10.0% from 18 to 24, 22.2% from 25 to 44, 19.6% from 45 to 64, and 14.4% who were 65 years of age or older. The median age was 28.8 years. For every 100 females, there were 104.3 males. For every 100 females age 18 and over, there were 100.2 males.

The median income for a household in the township was $62,700, and the median income for a family was $66,968. Males had a median income of $37,083 versus $22,317 for females. The per capita income for the township was $23,152. About 13.2% of families and 11.4% of the population were below the poverty line, including 12.2% of those under age 18 and 21.5% of those age 65 or over.

Historical population
Census	Pop.	Note	%±
1930	2,095		—
1940	2,223		6.1%
1950	2,206		−0.8%
1960	2,654		20.3%
1970	2,883		8.6%
1980	3,043		5.5%
1990	3,318		9.0%
2000	3,658		10.2%
2010	4,124		12.7%
2020	4,099		−0.6%
U.S. Decennial Census

== School districts ==
- Arcola Consolidated Unit School District 306
- Arthur Community Unit School District 305

== Political districts ==
- State House District 110
- State Senate District 55
