= Allenville, Illinois =

- Village
- Interactive map of Allenville, Illinois
- Coordinates: 39°33′30″N 88°32′19″W
- Country: United States
- State: Illinois
- County: Moultrie
- Township: East Nelson

Area
  - Total: 0.61 sq mi (1.58 km^{2})
  - Land: 0.61 sq mi (1.58 km^{2})
  - Water: 0 sq mi (0.00 km^{2})
- Elevation: 640 ft (200 m)

Population (2020)
  - Total: 132
  - Density: 217/sq mi (83.7/km^{2})
- Time zone: UTC-6 (CST)
  - Summer (DST): UTC-5 (CDT)
- ZIP Code: 61951
- Area code: 217
- FIPS code: 17-00867
- GNIS ID: 2397937

Allenville is a village in Moultrie County, Illinois, United States. The population was 132 at the 2020 census.

== Geography ==
Allenville is in southeastern Moultrie County along Illinois Route 121, which leads northwest 7 miles (11 km) to Sullivan, the county seat, and southeast 11 miles (18 km) to Mattoon.

According to the U.S. Census Bureau, Allenville has a total area of 0.61 square miles (1.58 km^{2}), all land. Coon Creek runs through the west side of the village, flowing north toward the Kaskaskia River in Lake Shelbyville.

== Demographics ==
Historical population
Census	Pop.	Note	%±
1890	45		—
1910	245		—
1920	286		16.7%
1930	248		−13.3%
1940	240		−3.2%
1950	253		5.4%
1960	191		−24.5%
1970	185		−3.1%
1980	203		9.7%
1990	166		−18.2%
2000	154		−7.2%
2010	148		−3.9%
2020	132		−10.8%
U.S. Decennial Census

As of the census of 2020, there were 132 people residing in the village, forming 52 households. The population density was 216.75 inhabitants per square mile (83.69/km^{2}). There were 67 housing units at an average density of 109.8 per square mile (42.4/km^{2}). Out of the 132 residents, 125 were White.

Among the 52 households, 15.4% had children under the age of 18 living with them, 53.8% were married couples living together, 11.5% had a female householder with no husband present, 30.8% were non-families, and 11.6% had someone living alone who was 65 years of age or older. 45 of the 52 housing units were owned, and 7 were rented.

In the village, the population was spread out, with 17.4% under the age of 21, 47.0% from 21 to 62, and 35.6% from who were 65 years of age or older. The median age was 51 years. For every 100 females, there were 103.1 males.

According to American Community Survey's estimates, in 2024, the median income for a household in the village was $69,250, and the median income for a family was $71,875. The per capita income for the village was $45,256. About 2.9% of families and 7.1% of the population were below the poverty line.
