= Bruce, Illinois =

- Unincorporated community
- Location within Illinois Location within the United States
- Coordinates: 39°31′08″N 88°35′40″W
- Country: United States
- State: Illinois
- County: Moultrie
- Elevation: 637 ft (194 m)
- Time zone: UTC-6 (Central (CST))
  - Summer (DST): UTC-5 (CDT)
- Area code: 217
- GNIS feature ID: 404994

Bruce is an unincorporated community in Moultrie County, Illinois, United States. Bruce is located on the border between Whitley and Sullivan townships, 5.5 miles (8.9 km) south of Sullivan.
