= Dunn, Illinois =

- Unincorporated community
- Location within Illinois Location within the United States
- Coordinates: 39°37′34″N 88°41′30″W
- Country: United States
- State: Illinois
- County: Moultrie
- Elevation: 656 ft (200 m)
- Time zone: UTC-6 (Central (CST))
  - Summer (DST): UTC-5 (CDT)
- Area code: 217
- GNIS feature ID: 422642

Dunn is an unincorporated community in Sullivan Township, Moultrie County, Illinois, United States. The community is on Illinois Route 121 4.8 miles (7.7 km) west-northwest of Sullivan.
