= Sullivan High School (Sullivan, Illinois) =

Location
- 725 N Main Street; Sullivan, Moultrie, Illinois 61951; United States
- Coordinates: 39°36′23″N 88°36′28″W

Information
- Other name: SHS
- Former names: Sullivan Township High School
- Type: Public
- School district: Sullivan Community Unit School District 300
- Superintendent: Ted Walk
- NCES School ID: 173813003906
- Principal: Daniel Allen
- Grades: 9–12
- Gender: Co-ed
- Enrollment: 317 (2024–25)
- Language: English
- Schedule type: Semester, daily
- Schedule: M–F except holidays
- Campus: Small town, rural
- Colors: Red; Black
- Fight song: Hail, Red and Black
- Athletics: IHSA
- Athletics conference: Lincoln Prairie Conference
- Sports: 7 boys', 7 girls'
- Team name: Redskins
- Rival: Okaw Valley High School
- Accreditation: North Central Association of Colleges and Schools
- Newspaper: Signal
- Yearbook: Retrospect
- Website: http://www.sullivan.k12.il.us/o/high-school

Sullivan High School is located in Sullivan, Moultrie County, Illinois, United States. It is a part of Community Unit School District 300. The school draws students from the towns of Sullivan, Allenville, and Kirksville.

== History ==
Sullivan High School was founded as Sullivan Township High School. The first yearbook, The Retrospect, was created by the senior class of 1913. Sullivan has been accredited for over 100 years, starting in 1917.

== Academics ==
Sullivan High School as of 2018 is ranked the 93rd best High School in Illinois out of 670 Illinois High Schools. Sullivan High School is also recognized in national rankings.

== Athletics ==
Sullivan’s High School athletics participate in the Lincoln Prairie Conference and are members of the Illinois High School Association.

=== Boys ===
- Baseball
- Basketball
- Cross Country
- Football
- Golf
- Swimming & Diving
- Track & Field

=== Girls ===
- Basketball
- Cheerleading
- Cross Country
- Golf
- Softball
- Swimming
- Track & Field
- Volleyball

=== Notable team state finishes ===
- Girls Basketball: 1990–91 (1st),
- Girls Track & Field: 2013–14 & 2014–15 (3rd)
- Boys Football: Considered to be the 1911 Illinois State Champions after beating Oak Park.

== Notable alumni ==
- Albert J. Beveridge (1881), American historian and US senator
- Steve Buxton (1980), former NFL player
- Tiny Hill (1924), bandleader
- Harold Pogue (1912), All-American football player

== See also ==
- List of high schools in Illinois
