= Gays, Illinois =

Village in Illinois

- Village
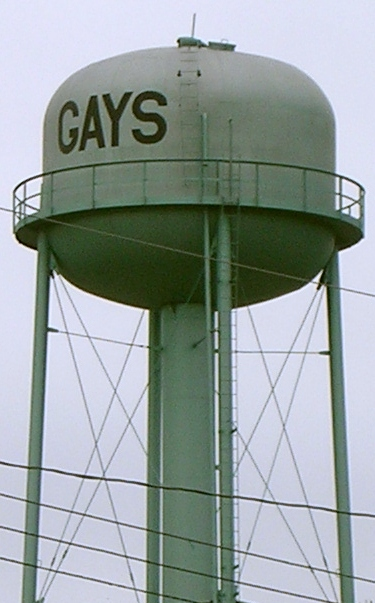
- Gays water tower

- Location in Moultrie County, Illinois
- Coordinates: 39°27′30″N 88°29′56″W
- Country: United States
- State: Illinois
- County: Moultrie
- Township: Whitley

Area
  - Total: 0.39 sq mi (1.00 km^{2})
  - Land: 0.39 sq mi (1.00 km^{2})
  - Water: 0 sq mi (0.00 km^{2})
- Elevation: 758 ft (231 m)

Population (2020)
  - Total: 218
  - Density: 564.8/sq mi (218.07/km^{2})
- Time zone: UTC-6 (CST)
  - Summer (DST): UTC-5 (CDT)
- ZIP code: 61928
- Area code: 217
- FIPS code: 17-28807
- GNIS ID: 2398948

Gays is a village in Moultrie County, Illinois, United States. The population was 218 at the 2020 census, down from 281 in 2010.

== Geography ==
Gays is in the southeast corner of Moultrie County, along Illinois Route 16, which leads east 6 miles (10 km) to Mattoon and west-southwest 17 miles (27 km) to Shelbyville. Sullivan, the Moultrie county seat, is 14 miles (23 km) to the northwest.

According to the U.S. Census Bureau, Gays has a total area of 0.39 square miles (1.01 km^{2}), all land.

=== Climate ===
Gays, Illinois

Climate chart (precipitation, max. and min. temperature)
| J | F | M | A | M | J | J | A | S | O | N | D |
| 2.4 35 20 | 2 40 24 | 3 52 33 | 3.8 65 43 | 4.4 74 54 | 4.1 83 62 | 4 86 66 | 3 85 64 | 3.1 79 56 | 3.7 68 45 | 4.1 52 35 | 3 38 24 |
- █ Average max. and min. temperatures in °F
- █ Precipitation totals in inches
- Source: The Weather Channel
Metric conversion
| J | F | M | A | M | J | J | A | S | O | N | D |
| 60 2 −7 | 51 4 −4 | 77 11 1 | 98 18 6 | 111 23 12 | 104 28 17 | 101 30 19 | 77 29 18 | 79 26 13 | 93 20 7 | 104 11 2 | 76 3 −4 |
- █ Average max. and min. temperatures in °C
- █ Precipitation totals in mm

Gays is located in Central Illinois, with a humid climate. Winters are cold and dry, spring brings severe weather, including the threat of tornadoes.

== Demographics ==
Historical population
| Census | Pop. | Note | %± |
|---|---|---|---|
| 1890 | 99 | | — |
| 1910 | 322 | | — |
| 1920 | 274 | | −14.9% |
| 1930 | 306 | | 11.7% |
| 1940 | 261 | | −14.7% |
| 1950 | 261 | | 0.0% |
| 1960 | 263 | | 0.8% |
| 1970 | 269 | | 2.3% |
| 1980 | 290 | | 7.8% |
| 1990 | 237 | | −18.3% |
| 2000 | 259 | | 9.3% |
| 2010 | 281 | | 8.5% |
| 2020 | 218 | | −22.4% |
U.S. Decennial Census

As of the census of 2000, there were 259 people, 99 households, and 76 families residing in the village. The population density was 633.5 inhabitants per square mile (244.6/km^{2}). There were 104 housing units at an average density of 254.4 per square mile (98.2/km^{2}). The racial makeup of the village was 98.46% White and 1.54% Pacific Islander.

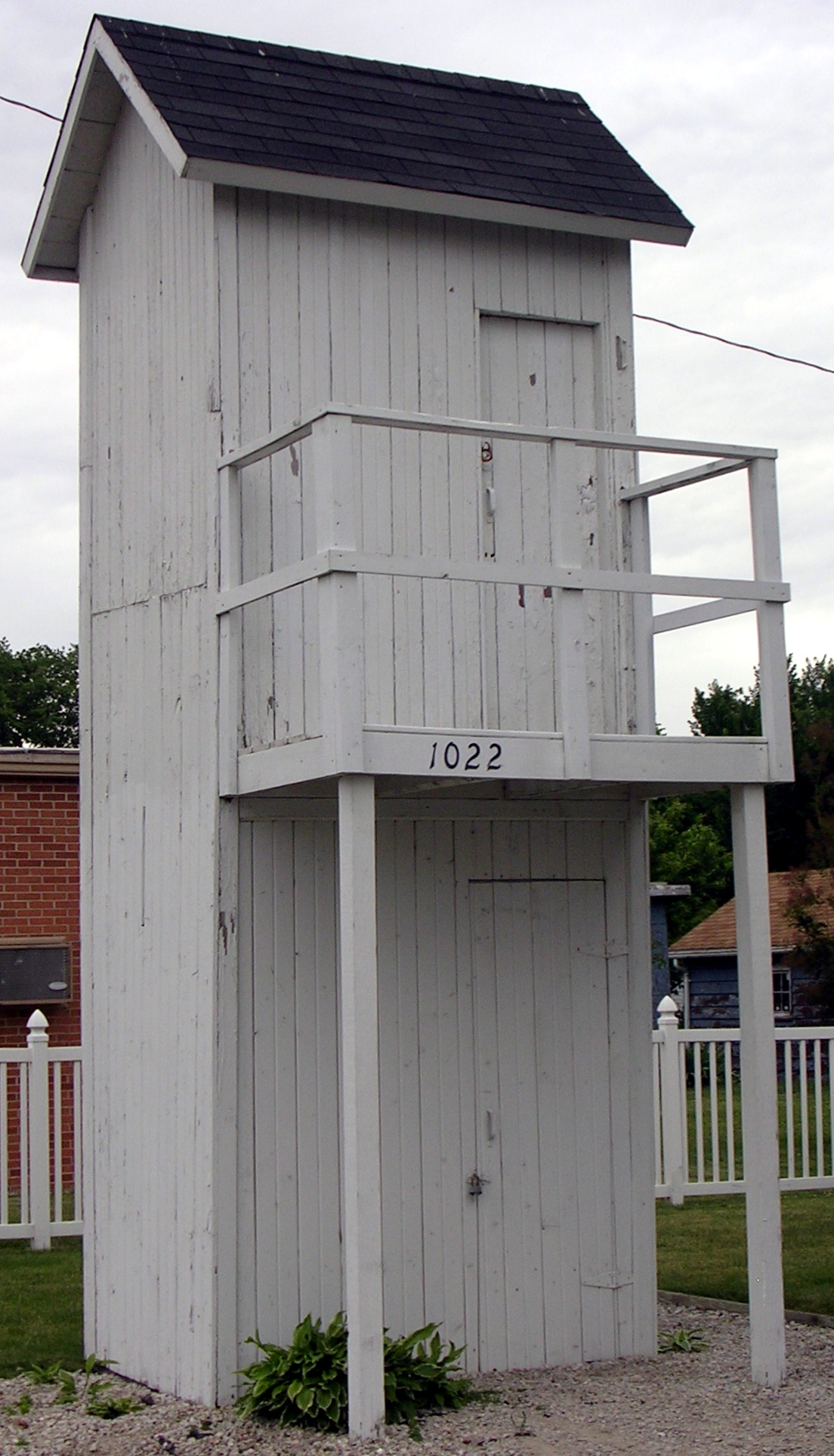
The Gays historical two-story outhouse

There were 99 households, out of which 41.4% had children under the age of 18 living with them, 65.7% were married couples living together, 5.1% had a female householder with no husband present, and 23.2% were non-families. 18.2% of all households were made up of individuals, and 6.1% had someone living alone who was 65 years of age or older. The average household size was 2.62 and the average family size was 3.00.

In the village, the population was spread out, with 27.8% under the age of 18, 5.8% from 18 to 24, 32.4% from 25 to 44, 23.6% from 45 to 64, and 10.4% who were 65 years of age or older. The median age was 34 years. For every 100 females, there were 112.3 males. For every 100 females age 18 and over, there were 107.8 males.

The median income for a household in the village was $42,500, and the median income for a family was $42,813. Males had a median income of $29,688 versus $21,944 for females. The per capita income for the village was $19,131. About 2.5% of families and 3.6% of the population were below the poverty line, including 5.6% of those under the age of eighteen and none of those 65 or over.

== Arts and culture ==
A two-story outhouse is located in the town. It was built in 1869 for apartments that were attached to a general store. The top floor was used by the apartment dwellers while the bottom floor was used by patrons of the store. Although the store and apartments were demolished, the outhouse remained. Each level has two seats, so the outhouse could be used by four at a time. Waste from the top level dropped behind a false wall into a pit. It is located at the corner of N Pine Street and Front Street. 39°27′32″N 88°29′44″W

On August 14, 2021 the Village of Gays celebrated the history of the two-story outhouse by having the "Two Story Outhouse Festival". The event included breakfast provided by the Windsor high school FFA, a car show, vendors, food trucks and more. Instead of a traditional ribbon-cutting, the festival opted for a toilet paper cutting to mark the beginning of the festival. The honor of cutting the toilet paper “ribbon” was given to the Villages oldest living resident at the time, Hattie Hortenstine, who was 97 years old.

Hattie Hortenstine after cutting toilet paper “ribbon” at the inaugural “Two Story Outhouse Festival” in Gays, Illinois.

Hattie Hortenstine cutting toilet paper “ribbon” at the inaugural “Two Story Outhouse Festival” in Gays, Illinois.

Hattie Hortenstine, the Villages oldest living resident in 2021, standing beside the Two Story Outhouse.

West of the outhouse is the former site of what was claimed to be Hitler's bicycle. A rusty bicycle once hung on a pole with a sign that read "Hitler's Bike (1932)".
