= Okaw =

Okaw may refer to:

- Okawville, Illinois, a village, formerly known as Okaw, United States
- The Kaskaskia River, formerly known as the Okaw River, Illinois, United States
- The West Okaw River, Illinois, United States
