= Dalton City, Illinois =

- Village
- Location in Moultrie County, Illinois
- Coordinates: 39°43′01″N 88°48′25″W
- Country: United States
- State: Illinois
- County: Moultrie
- Township: Dora

Area
  - Total: 0.53 sq mi (1.38 km^{2})
  - Land: 0.53 sq mi (1.38 km^{2})
  - Water: 0 sq mi (0.00 km^{2})
- Elevation: 686 ft (209 m)

Population (2020)
  - Total: 454
  - Density: 851/sq mi (328.4/km^{2})
- Time zone: UTC-6 (CST)
  - Summer (DST): UTC-5 (CDT)
- ZIP code: 61925
- Area code: 217
- FIPS code: 17-18446
- GNIS ID: 2398673

Dalton City is a village in Moultrie County, Illinois, United States. It is in the center of the state near the Macon County line. The population was 454 at the 2020 census, down from 544 in 2010.

== History ==
Dalton City was incorporated as a village on September 15, 1877. The village was the birthplace of Henry Gleason, a 20th-century ecologist and taxonomist.

== Geography ==
Dalton City is in northwestern Moultrie County, with its western border following the Macon County line. The village is located along Route 121 at its intersection with Route 128. IL 121 runs along the northern and eastern edges of the village, leading southeast 6 miles (10 km) to Bethany and 13 miles (21 km) to Sullivan, the Moultrie county seat, while to the northwest it leads six miles to Mount Zion and 13 miles to Decatur. IL 128 runs along the west side of the village, leading south 22 miles (35 km) to Shelbyville.

According to the 2010 census, Dalton City has a total area of 0.53 square miles (1.37 km^{2}), all land. It is within the West Okaw River watershed.

== Demographics ==
Historical population
| Census | Pop. | Note | %± |
|---|---|---|---|
| 1880 | 280 | | — |
| 1890 | 334 | | 19.3% |
| 1900 | 388 | | 16.2% |
| 1910 | 400 | | 3.1% |
| 1920 | 446 | | 11.5% |
| 1930 | 403 | | −9.6% |
| 1940 | 354 | | −12.2% |
| 1950 | 384 | | 8.5% |
| 1960 | 386 | | 0.5% |
| 1970 | 427 | | 10.6% |
| 1980 | 574 | | 34.4% |
| 1990 | 573 | | −0.2% |
| 2000 | 581 | | 1.4% |
| 2010 | 544 | | −6.4% |
| 2020 | 454 | | −16.5% |
U.S. Decennial Census

As of the census of 2000, there were 581 people, 212 households, and 170 families residing in the village. The population density was 941.7 inhabitants per square mile (363.6/km^{2}). There were 224 housing units at an average density of 363.1 per square mile (140.2/km^{2}). The racial makeup of the village was 98.62% White, 0.52% African American, 0.52% Native American, 0.17% from other races, and 0.17% from two or more races. Hispanic or Latino of any race were 1.55% of the population.

There were 212 households, out of which 44.3% had children under the age of 18 living with them, 69.8% were married couples living together, 6.6% had a female householder with no husband present, and 19.8% were non-families. 17.5% of all households were made up of individuals, and 3.8% had someone living alone who was 65 years of age or older. The average household size was 2.74 and the average family size was 3.09.

In the village, the population was spread out, with 31.2% under the age of 18, 7.2% from 18 to 24, 32.5% from 25 to 44, 21.2% from 45 to 64, and 7.9% who were 65 years of age or older. The median age was 33 years. For every 100 females, there were 93.7 males. For every 100 females age 18 and over, there were 97.0 males.

The median income for a household in the village was $48,958, and the median income for a family was $53,224. Males had a median income of $36,094 versus $20,417 for females. The per capita income for the village was $16,946. About 2.8% of families and 4.1% of the population were below the poverty line, including 4.8% of those under age 18 and 10.0% of those age 65 or over.

== Government ==
Since the Cutback Amendment, Dalton City has been part of the 101st district of the Illinois House of Representatives.
