= Bethany, Illinois =

- Village
- Location in Moultrie County, Illinois
- Coordinates: 39°38′40″N 88°44′48″W
- Country: United States
- State: Illinois
- County: Moultrie
- Township: Marrowbone
- Established: 1877

Area
  - Total: 0.98 sq mi (2.54 km^{2})
  - Land: 0.98 sq mi (2.53 km^{2})
  - Water: 0.0039 sq mi (0.01 km^{2})
- Elevation: 659 ft (201 m)

Population (2020)
  - Total: 1,255
  - Density: 1,285.0/sq mi (496.16/km^{2})
- Time zone: UTC-6 (CST)
  - Summer (DST): UTC-5 (CDT)
- ZIP code: 61914
- Area code: 217
- FIPS code: 17-05612
- GNIS ID: 2398109
- Website: www.villageofbethany.com

Bethany is a village in Moultrie County, Illinois, United States. The population was 1,255 at the 2020 census, down from 1,352 in 2010.

== Geography ==
Bethany is in western Moultrie County along Illinois Route 121, which runs along the northern and eastern sides of the village. IL 121 leads southeast 8 miles (13 km) to Sullivan, the county seat, and northwest 19 miles (31 km) to Decatur.

According to the U.S. Census Bureau, Bethany has a total area of 0.98 square miles (2.54 km^{2}), of which 0.002 square miles (0.01 km^{2}), or 0.20%, are water. Marrowbone Creek runs through the western and southern parts of the village, flowing southeast toward the West Okaw River, part of the Kaskaskia River watershed.

== Demographics ==
Historical population
Census	Pop.	Note	%±
1880	269		—
1890	688		155.8%
1900	873		26.9%
1910	859		−1.6%
1920	842		−2.0%
1930	802		−4.8%
1940	819		2.1%
1950	850		3.8%
1960	1,118		31.5%
1970	1,235		10.5%
1980	1,550		25.5%
1990	1,369		−11.7%
2000	1,287		−6.0%
2010	1,352		5.1%
2020	1,255		−7.2%
U.S. Decennial Census

=== 2020 census ===
As of the 2020 census, Bethany had a population of 1,255. The median age was 42.6 years. 24.5% of residents were under the age of 18 and 21.8% of residents were 65 years of age or older. For every 100 females there were 94.0 males, and for every 100 females age 18 and over there were 90.2 males age 18 and over.

0.0% of residents lived in urban areas, while 100.0% lived in rural areas.

There were 539 households in Bethany, of which 31.0% had children under the age of 18 living in them. Of all households, 46.9% were married-couple households, 18.4% were households with a male householder and no spouse or partner present, and 29.1% were households with a female householder and no spouse or partner present. About 30.4% of all households were made up of individuals and 14.6% had someone living alone who was 65 years of age or older.

There were 574 housing units, of which 6.1% were vacant. The homeowner vacancy rate was 3.1% and the rental vacancy rate was 3.8%.

Racial composition as of the 2020 census
Race	Number	Percent
White	1,187	94.6%
Black or African American	0	0.0%
American Indian and Alaska Native	9	0.7%
Asian	2	0.2%
Native Hawaiian and Other Pacific Islander	1	0.1%
Some other race	8	0.6%
Two or more races	48	3.8%
Hispanic or Latino (of any race)	16	1.3%

=== 2000 census ===
As of the census of 2000, there were 1,287 people, 544 households, and 386 families residing in the village. The population density was 1,323.6 inhabitants per square mile (511.0/km^{2}). There were 580 housing units at an average density of 596.5 per square mile (230.3/km^{2}). The racial makeup of the village was 98.99% White, 0.08% African American, 0.16% Native American, 0.31% from other races, and 0.47% from two or more races. Hispanic or Latino of any race were 0.23% of the population.

There were 544 households, out of which 28.3% had children under the age of 18 living with them, 61.4% were married couples living together, 6.6% had a female householder with no husband present, and 29.0% were non-families. 25.9% of all households were made up of individuals, and 15.1% had someone living alone who was 65 years of age or older. The average household size was 2.37 and the average family size was 2.84.

In the village, the population was spread out, with 23.0% under the age of 18, 7.3% from 18 to 24, 26.1% from 25 to 44, 25.6% from 45 to 64, and 18.0% who were 65 years of age or older. The median age was 40 years. For every 100 females, there were 95.9 males. For every 100 females age 18 and over, there were 90.2 males.

The median income for a household in the village was $34,091, and the median income for a family was $44,276. Males had a median income of $36,250 versus $20,603 for females. The per capita income for the village was $16,888. About 5.7% of families and 7.4% of the population were below the poverty line, including 14.0% of those under age 18 and 7.0% of those age 65 or over.

== Education ==
Bethany is home to Okaw Valley Community Unit School District 302. Okaw Valley is a K-12 district that was created in 2001 when the schools of Bethany and Findlay consolidated their individual school districts. The elementary and high school are located in Bethany while the middle school is located in Findlay. Okaw Valley's school sports teams have the nickname "Timberwolves" and compete in the “Lincoln Prairie Conference.”

== Notable person ==
- Wesley Livsey Jones, U.S. senator of Washington state 1909–32; born in Bethany
