= Fuller, Illinois =

- Unincorporated community
- Location within Illinois Location within the United States
- Coordinates: 39°35′38″N 88°28′12″W
- Country: United States
- State: Illinois
- Counties: Coles and Moultrie
- Elevation: 666 ft (203 m)
- Time zone: UTC-6 (Central (CST))
  - Summer (DST): UTC-5 (CDT)
- Area code: 217
- GNIS feature ID: 422720

Fuller is an unincorporated community in Coles and Moultrie counties, Illinois, United States. Fuller is 7.5 miles (12.1 km) east of Sullivan.
