= List of Indiana State Sycamores in the NFL draft =

This is a list of Indiana State Sycamores football players in the NFL draft.

== Key ==
B	Back	K	Kicker	NT	Nose tackle
C	Center	LB	Linebacker	FB	Fullback
DB	Defensive back	P	Punter	HB	Halfback
DE	Defensive end	QB	Quarterback	WR	Wide receiver
DT	Defensive tackle	RB	Running back	G	Guard
E	End	T	Offensive tackle	TE	Tight end

= Pro Bowler
= Hall of Famer

== Selections ==
Year	Round	Pick	Overall	Player	Team	Position
1967	7	10	169	John Truitt	Chicago Bears	WR
1970	10	10	244	Jim Brumfield	New Orleans Saints	RB
1973	12	24	310	Willie Lee	Pittsburgh Steelers	RB
1975	17	20	436	Ken Monroe	St. Louis Cardinals	RB
1976	13	12	359	Larry Brumfield	San Francisco 49ers	DT
1980	6	27	165	Tunch Ilkin	Pittsburgh Steelers	T
1982	6	11	150	Craig Shaffer	St. Louis Cardinals	LB
1984	7	25	193	Ed Martin	Dallas Cowboys	LB
1985	2	11	39	Wayne Davis	San Diego Chargers	CB
1985	8	21	217	Steve Buxton	Chicago Bears	OT
1986	2	24	54	Vencie Glenn	New England Patriots	S
1987	10	1	252	Mike Simmonds	Tampa Bay Buccaneers	G
1987	10	16	267	Bob Riley	Minnesota Vikings	T
1992	12	15	323	Charles Swann	New York Giants	WR
1996	7	27	237	Dan Brandenburg	Buffalo Bills	DE

== Notable undrafted players ==
Note: No drafts held before 1920

Debut year	Player name	Position	Debut NFL/AFL team	Notes
1985	Rick Dwenger	FB	Indianapolis Colts	—
1994	John Bock	C	Buffalo Bills	—
2017	Robert Tonyan	TE	Detroit Lions	—
2020	Dominique Dafney	TE	Indianapolis Colts	—
2020	Jonas Griffith	LB	San Francisco 49ers	—
2026	Rashad Rochelle	WR	Seattle Seahawks	—
