= Tiny Hill =

American big band leader

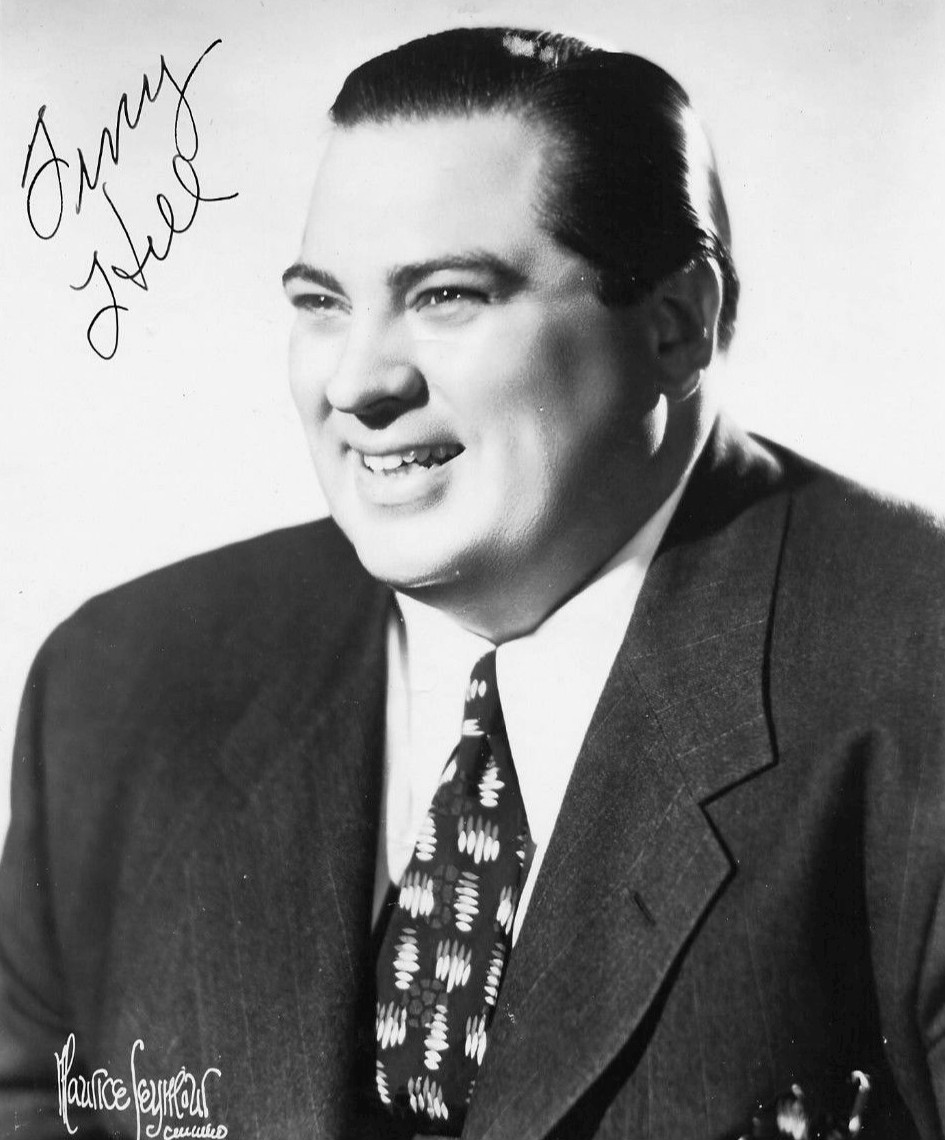

Background information
- Born: Harry Lawrence Hill; July 19, 1906
- Origin: Sullivan, Illinois, U.S.
- Died: December 13, 1971 (aged 65)
- Genres: Jazz; Big band
- Occupation: Bandleader
- Instruments: Drums; Banjo; Güiro
- Years active: 1931–1971
- Labels: Vocalion, Okeh, Columbia, Harmony, Decca, Mercury

Harry Lawrence "Tiny" Hill (July 19, 1906 – December 13, 1971) was an American band leader of the big band era. During the height of his career, Hill was billed as "America's Biggest Bandleader" because of his weight of over 365 lb (166 kg). His signature song was "Angry", which he first recorded in 1939 on the Vocalion label. He used sandpaper blocks and a güiro to generate a double shuffle "beat that makes the listener itch to dance".

== Early life ==
Hill was born in Sullivan Township, Moultrie County, Illinois. His parents were William Fred Hill (1880–1915) and Osa Crowdson Ault (1890–1982). His parents separated when he was seven years old and he went to live with an aunt. He was active in high school sports and was president of his senior class. He graduated from Sullivan High School in 1924. Hill then attended Illinois State Normal School for two years. Financial difficulties forced him to leave college to go to work. He went to Detroit, where he worked in a produce warehouse. After a series of short term jobs, he ended up driving a team of mules for the Midwest Canning Company in Rochelle, Illinois.

== His own band ==
In 1931 Hill formed his first big band, which was known as the "Fat Man's Band". Hill played the drums with the trio, which played for several years in and around Decatur, Illinois. In 1934 Hill joined the Byron Dunbar band in Decatur as a drummer and vocalist. After a year with Dunbar, Hill left to form his own band, taking many of Dunbar's band members with him. They had their first appearance at the Ingleterra Ballroom in Peoria, Illinois on October 31, 1935.

Members of Hill's new band were Dick Coffeen and Harold King on trumpets; John Noreuil on trombone, Jim Shielf on piano, Reightno Corrington on bass and Monty Montjoy on drumns. The reed section included Bobby Walters, Bob Kramar and Nook Schreier, who also did arranging. The group's style was Dixieland jazz and hillbilly music. Their theme song was "Dream Girl". By 1937 the band was playing its warm and easy-to-dance-to music three nights a week to packed audiences at the Ingleterra Ballroom.

In September 1939, the band was heard over Remote WGN Radio broadcasts from the Melody Mill Ballroom in the Chicago suburb of North Riverside, Illinois. The band played for several years at the Melody Mill and acquired a large following throughout the Midwest.

Augmented by vocalists such as Allen De Witt, Bob Freeman, Irwin Bendell and Hill himself, the group's popularity soon extended to Nebraska, Missouri and Iowa, growing steadily throughout the 30s and 40s. Soon the band was playing in ballrooms coast to coast. Hill toured the country for a while and landed on the coast to play four months at the Casino Gardens, Ocean Park, California. He returned to Chicago in 1942. Further appearances included Aragon and Trianon in Chicago and The Rainbow Ballroom in Denver.

In 1943, Hill and his orchestra became the summer replacement band on the Lucky Strike Your Hit Parade radio show.

Hill was featured on the cover of the September 23, 1944, edition of Billboard magazine.

In 1945, he was hired as folk music director at Mercury Records. He was featured again on the cover of Billboard magazine on August 4, 1945.

He resigned as country A&R man at Mercury in March 1948.

At a performance at the Trianon Ballroom, South Gate, California, June 18, 1946, booked by MCA, the members of the orchestra consisted of:

- Vocalists: Tiny Hill, Buddy Milton, Bobby Anderson, Russ Phillips
- Cornets: Sterling Bose, Bobby Anderson
- Trombones: Harry Taff, Russ Phillips, Jimmy James
- Saxes: Buddy Walden, Bobby Walter, Vic Jaroney, Jim Turner
- Rhythm: Buddy Milton, guitar; Clarence (Penny) Pfiefer, drums; Pat Paterson, bass; Jimmy Shields, piano
- Arrangers: Wally Fobart, Ralph Morse, Bobby Walter, Bobby Anderson

Hill and his band continued to enjoy success for many years, well into the 1950s, until the end of the big band era.

== Married life ==
Hill was married three times. He was first married to Alta M. Blystone (née Frederick) from Sullivan, Illinois, in Toledo Ohio in 1928. She traveled with Hill and his mother, cooking meals for the band when they were on the road. They were divorced in Decatur, IL in April 1946.

On May 1, 1946, Hill married 31-year-old Jenny Lou Carson, a country music singer and songwriter. The couple purchased a log cabin on Naches Pass near Mount Rainier, Washington in 1948. The couple had a successful business partnership, with Hill performing many of Carson's songs and eventually recording eleven of her songs, including "Never Trust A Woman" in 1947. Hill's mother did not like Carson. Carson filed for divorce in April 1949; it became final on July 5, 1949.

On March 7, 1957, in Miami, Oklahoma, Hill married Catherine Marie Pearson (1922-1958), a native of Joplin, Missouri.

== Popular songs ==
Hill's band performed in ballrooms across the country and on radio and recording such songs as "Angry", "Sioux City Sue", "Heartaches", "I'll Sail My Ship Alone", "Who's Sorry Now?", "Five Foot Two, Eyes of Blue", "I'm Looking Over a Four Leaf Clover", "Move It On Over", "Mockin' Bird Hill", If You Knew Susie, and "Slow Poke".

In 1951 Hill had a hit with a cover of "Hot Rod Race" written by George Wilson.

In all, Hill made over 95 recordings on six different labels.

== Later years ==
In January 1950, Hill moved to Colorado where he would spend time when not on the road. He purchased a 140-acre (0.57 km^{2}) dairy farm at Fort Lupton named Mountain View. In 1951, the band traveled 46,000 miles (74,000 km) in ten months. In 1952, the band racked up 61,000 miles (98,000 km) in 11 months, in his fleet of Packard automobiles. Fast cars were one of Hill's hobbies. In 1951 and again in 1952, the band was his guests at the Indianapolis Memorial Day Races. Another of his hobbies was cooking. In 1956, Hill opened Radio Station KHIL in Brighton, Colorado.

He eventually spent less time on the road and more time with his business interests.

Despite the ending of the Big Bands era, Hill continued to play in small combos in the Denver-Brighton area, often returning to the Midwest for guest appearances. Undeterred by the decline in the commercial appeal of the big band sound, Hill resolutely remained at the helm of the combo until his death in 1971. His final public performance was to a capacity audience in Emden, Illinois, on July 17, 1971. The inscription on his tombstone reads: "Forgotten quickly by many, remembered forever by a few."

Today, the Tiny Hill Orchestra is based in the Ozark Theatre of St. Louis, Missouri, in the summer months and in south Texas during the winter. Performances feature the historic hit records, previously unreleased period pieces and contemporary music. The orchestra is directed by arranger and multi instrumentalist, Dan Stevens.

== Selected discography of the Tiny Hill band ==
- "Angry" (Mecum, Brunies & Cassard) - August 1939 Vocalion Records 4957
- "Mickey" - Voc. Erwin Bendel, November 21, 1939, Vocalion 5445, mx.25576
- "Please Don't Talk About Me When I'm Gone" - November 21, 1939, Vocalion 5445, mx.25568
- "Dream Girl" - August 14, 1939, Vocalion 5060, mx.W-26005-A
- "Doodle Doo Doo" - August 14, 1939, Vocalion 5060, mx.W-26006-A
- "Every Little Movement" - August 14, 1939, Vocalion 5128, mx.26007-A
- "Mama's Gone, Goodbye" - August 14, 1939, Vocalion 5128, mx.26008-A
- "Jingle Bells" - November 21, 1939, Vocalion 5248, mx.25569-1
- "For He's (A) Jolly Good Fellow" - November 21, 1939, Vocalion 5248, mx.25575-1
- "Auld Lang Syne" - Voc. Erwin Bendel - November 21, 1939, Vocalion 5275, mx.25567-1
- "I'll Keep On Loving You" - November 21, 1939, Vocalion 5275, mx.25566-1
- "Skirts" - November 21, 1939, Vocalion 5340, mx.25570
- "I Get The Blues When It Rains" - November 21, 1939, Vocalion 5340, mx.25573
- "Five Foot Two, Eyes of Blue" - July 1940, Okeh Records 05635
- "Sioux City Sue" - February 1946 Mercury Records 2024
- "If You Knew Susie" (DeSylvia & Meyer) January 1948, Mercury Records, 6976
- "Move It On Over" - 1952, Mercury Records 70029
- "Sings And Plays the Hits of World War I" - 1962, Mercury Records SR 60723
