= West Okaw River =

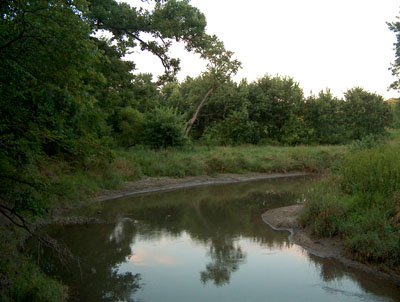

Physical characteristics
- Source
  - location: Moultrie County southwest of Hammond
  - coordinates: 39°46′57″N 88°38′11″W
- Mouth
  - location: Confluence with the Kaskaskia River in Lake Shelbyville
  - coordinates: 39°31′42″N 88°41′41″W
  - elevation: 600 ft (180 m)
- Length: 32 mi (51 km)
- Discharge
  - location: Lovington, Illinois
  - average: 112 cu/ft. per sec.

Basin features
- GNIS ID: 420878

The West Okaw River is a tributary of the Kaskaskia River, which it joins in Moultrie County, Illinois. The West Okaw forms an arm of Lake Shelbyville where the natural rivers used to meet.

The West Okaw is the western fork of the Kaskaskia, which was formerly known as the Okaw. The name "Okaw" comes from the Mississippi Valley French au Kaskaskies ("to the Kaskaskias"), which was commonly shortened to au Kas. The town of Okawville is located close to the Kaskaskia, but about 100 miles downstream from the West Okaw. The Okaw Valley Council of the Boy Scouts of America is also centered on the Kaskaskia River, far downstream from the West Okaw.

The West Okaw is about 32 miles (51 km) in length, as measured from the junction of the arms of Lake Shelbyville. This figure includes the drainage ditches, which extend the stream about eight miles above the natural channel.

The watershed of the West Okaw was formed during the Wisconsin glaciation, about 70,000 to 10,000 years before present. The Wisconsin ice sheet advanced roughly to the Lake Shelbyville Dam, forming a terminal moraine. The meltwater overtopped the moraine, forming the modern Kaskaskia River, which flowed on through land of older Illinoian Stage.

== Cities, towns and counties ==
The following cities, towns and villages are in the West Okaw watershed:

- Bethany
- Dalton City
- Hammond
- LaPlace
- Lovington

Parts of the following Illinois counties are drained by the West Okaw:

- Macon County
- Moultrie County
- Piatt County
- Shelby County

== See also ==
- List of Illinois rivers
