= Kirksville, Illinois =

- Unincorporated community
- Location within Illinois Location within the United States
- Coordinates: 39°34′14″N 88°40′06″W
- Country: United States
- State: Illinois
- County: Moultrie
- Elevation: 676 ft (206 m)
- Time zone: UTC-6 (Central (CST))
  - Summer (DST): UTC-5 (CDT)
- Area code: 217
- GNIS feature ID: 411549

Kirksville is an unincorporated community in Moultrie County, Illinois, United States. Kirksville is located in Sullivan Township, 3.5 miles (5.6 km) southwest of Sullivan.
