= Chesterville, Illinois =

- Unincorporated community
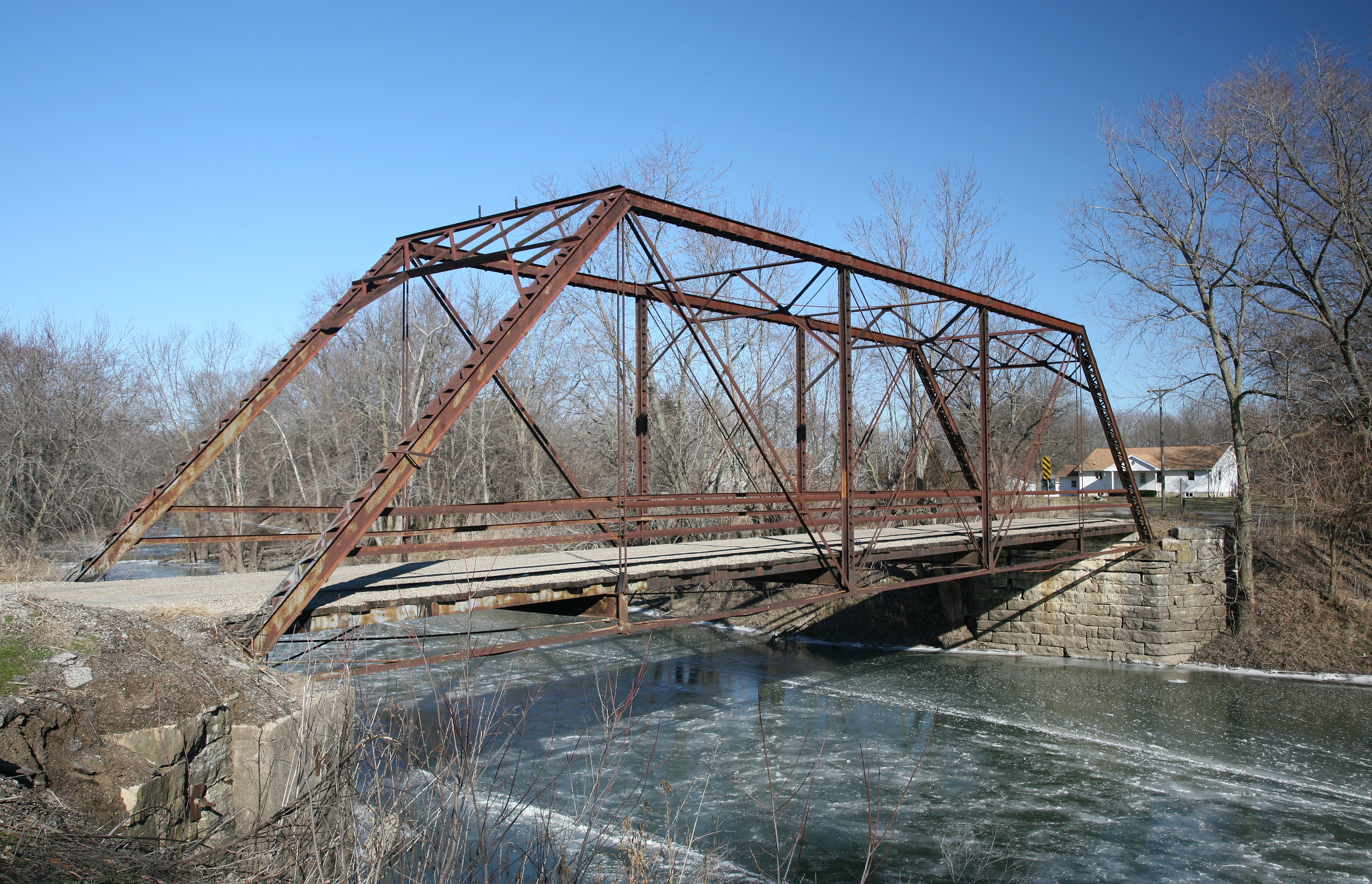
- Truss bridge in Chesterville

- Location within Illinois Location within the United States
- Coordinates: 39°42′12″N 88°23′28″W
- Country: United States
- State: Illinois
- County: Douglas
- Elevation: 653 ft (199 m)
- Time zone: UTC-6 (Central (CST))
  - Summer (DST): UTC-5 (CDT)
- Zip: 61827
- Area code: 217
- GNIS feature ID: 406032

Chesterville is an unincorporated community in Douglas County, Illinois, United States. Chesterville is located on Illinois Route 133, 4 miles (6.4 km) east of Arthur.

== History ==
Chesterville was located on Illinois and Midland Railroad, and the first water tank for the railway's steam locomotives was erected here.

In the 1880s, Chesterville contained "a few dwellings and a store", a grain business, a pharmacy, a school, a post-office, a United Brethren church, and was "the headquarters for the businesses of the township". J. H. Apperson, president of the Douglas County Medical Society, lived in Chesterville.

Smallpox was detected in Chesterville in 1899, and in 1890, the population of Chesterville was 28.

In 2021, fire destroyed Sunnyside Mennonite Church in Chesterville.
