= Dalton City =

Dalton City can refer to the following:

- Dalton City, Illinois
- Dalton City (Lucky Luke), a Lucky Luke comic
