= Moultrie County Courthouse =

Local government building in the United States

- U.S. National Register of Historic Places
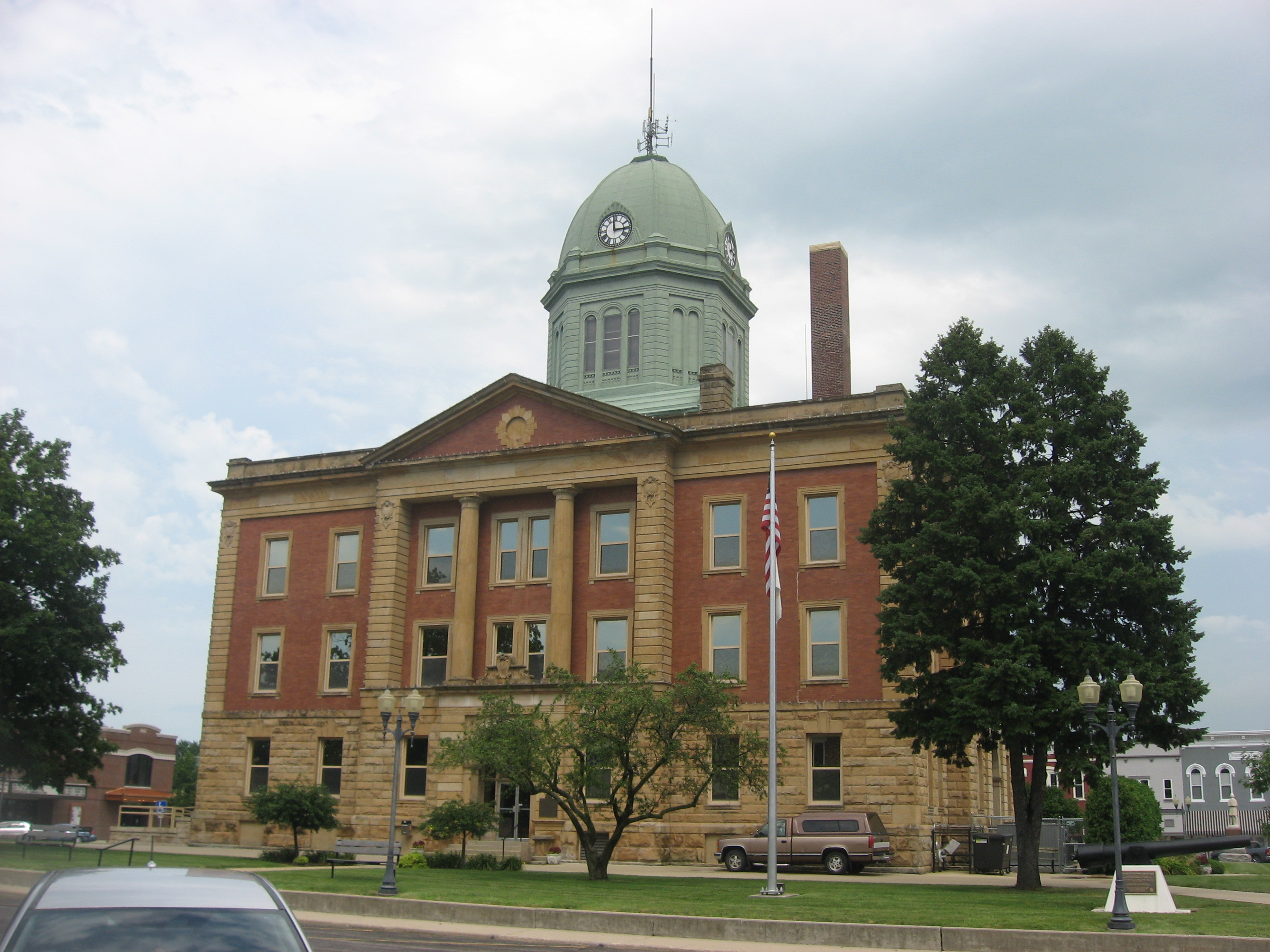
- View from the west

- Location within Illinois Location within the United States
- Interactive map showing the location of Moultrie County Courthouse
- Location: 10 S. Main St., Sullivan, Illinois
- Coordinates: 39°35′54″N 88°36′36″W
- Area: less than one acre
- Built by: H.B. Walters
- Architect: Deal & Ginzel
- Architectural style: Classical Revival
- NRHP reference No.: 95000489
- Added to NRHP: April 20, 1995

The Moultrie County Courthouse is the only site in Moultrie County, Illinois that is listed on the National Register of Historic Places. Located in the county seat of Sullivan, the courthouse has been listed since 1995.

== History ==
=== Earlier courthouses ===
Moultrie County, Illinois was first settled around 1820. By 1842, local residents wanted a more local representation in government. That Fall, residents presented a petition to the state government to form a new county out of parts of Shelby and Coles Counties. The county was officially formed on February 16, 1843; it was named after Col. William Moultrie. East Nelson was chosen as the first county seat, but residents could not agree on a suitable location for the courthouse. The county held a second election for county seat and Asa's Point, which would thenceforth be known as Sullivan, was chosen as the site. The first courthouse was built in 1847. It was destroyed in a fire on November 25, 1864. The next year, plans were made for a new courthouse, built with local materials. It was completed in 1866. In 1896, the north side of the courthouse was host to a lynching. Grant Atteberry was imprisoned under accusations that he assaulted a local woman. An angry mob stormed the courthouse and demanded that the sheriff release the man to their custody. The sheriff agreed and the man was hanged from a tree on the northwest corner of the courthouse lawn.

=== Present courthouse ===
By 1904, the courthouse was deemed too small for county needs and plans for a new courthouse were approved. Deal & Ginsel were selected as architects and H. B. Walters of Danville, Illinois was appointed contractor. Work started some time between August and December 1904 and the courthouse was completed on August 6, 1906. Since its completion, the building has housed functions of county government. Its Circuit Courtroom has been a popular location for community functions because of its large size. From about 1907 to 1930, the courthouse was home to the Moultrie County Farmers' Institute, a popular three-day educational meeting co-sponsored by the University of Illinois College of Agriculture. The most noteworthy trial to take place was the embezzlement trial of Jimmy Steel and Z. B. Whitfield of the Merchants & Farmers State Bank in 1921. On April 20, 1995, the building was recognized by the National Park Service with a listing on the National Register of Historic Places.
