= Sullivan High School (disambiguation) =

Sullivan High School may refer to:

- Sullivan High School (Chicago)
- Sullivan High School (Sullivan, Illinois)
- Sullivan High School (Sullivan, Indiana)
