= Steve Buxton =

Steve Buxton may refer to:

- Steve Buxton (American football)
- Steve Buxton (footballer, born 1888) (1888–1953), English football left back
- Steve Buxton (footballer, born 1960), English football forward
