= R. Eden Martin =

American lawyer

- Born: Sullivan, Illinois
- Education: University of Illinois at Urbana–Champaign; Harvard Law School
- Occupation: Lawyer

R. Eden Martin is an American lawyer, born Robert Eden Martin, May 17, 1940. Martin was a partner at the law firm Sidley Austin LLP from 1975 to 2004. Martin has served as president of The Commercial Club of Chicago since 1999. He is a member of the boards of directors of the Chicago Board Options Exchange, and Nicor Inc., a life trustee of the Chicago Symphony Orchestra and a member of the board of trustees of Northwestern University. He has been an Aon Corporation director since 2002 and serves as chairman of Aon Foundation. He has also served on the boards of the University of Illinois Foundation, the Chicago History Museum, and the Ravinia Festival. Martin is well known as a book collector and donor to libraries, and has composed music for piano.

== Awards ==
Inducted as a Laureate of The Lincoln Academy of Illinois and awarded the Order of Lincoln (the State's highest honor) by the Governor of Illinois in 2017.
