= Jonathan Creek Township, Moultrie County, Illinois =

Jonathan Creek Township
- Township

- Location of Illinois in the United States
- Coordinates: 39°39′02″N 88°31′45″W
- Country: United States
- State: Illinois
- County: Moultrie
- Settled: November 6, 1866

Area
  - Total: 36.79 sq mi (95.3 km^{2})
  - Land: 36.79 sq mi (95.3 km^{2})
  - Water: 0 sq mi (0 km^{2})
- Elevation: 666 ft (203 m)

Population (2010)
  - Estimate (2016): 1,004
  - Density: 26.9/sq mi (10.4/km^{2})
- Time zone: UTC-6 (CST)
  - Summer (DST): UTC-5 (CDT)
- Postal code: 61951
- Area code: 217
- FIPS code: 17-139-38609

Jonathan Creek Township is located in Moultrie County, Illinois. As of the 2010 census, its population was 990 and it contained 265 housing units. A large Amish community is present in Jonathan Creek Township.

== Geography ==
According to the 2010 census, the township has a total area of 36.79 square miles (95.3 km^{2}), all land.

== Demographics ==
Historical population
| Census | Pop. | Note | %± |
|---|---|---|---|
| 2016 (est.) | 1,004 |
U.S. Decennial Census
