= Becks Creek =

Physical characteristics
- Source
  - location: City of Pana
  - coordinates: 39°22′45″N 89°04′11″W
- Mouth
  - location: Confluence with the Kaskaskia River, Fayette County
  - coordinates: 39°08′55″N 88°56′39″W
  - elevation: 499 ft (152 m)

Basin features
- GNIS ID: 404081

Becks Creek is a stream located in Fayette, Shelby and Christian counties, Illinois, in the United States. It is a tributary of the Kaskaskia River.

Becks Creek was named after Paul Beck and his son Guy Beck, pioneers who settled along the creek in 1815.

== See also ==
- List of rivers of Illinois
