= Sullivan Community Unit School District 300 =

School district in Illinois, United States

Address
- 725 N Main Street Sullivan, Moultrie, Illinois, 61951; United States
- Coordinates: 39°36′23″N 88°36′28″W

District information
- Type: Public Coed
- Motto: “Thinking of Students First”
- Grades: PreK–12
- President: Jeff White
- Superintendent: Ted Walk
- Schools: Sullivan High School (9–12); Sullivan Middle School (5–8); Sullivan Elementary school (PreK–4)

Students and staff
- Students: 2018–19; 1,175 District; 328 (9–12); 250 (5–8); 550 (PreK–4)
- Athletic conference: Lincoln Prairie Conference
- District mascot: Redskins
- Colors: Red; Black

Other information
- Website: http://www.sullivan.k12.il.us/o/district

Sullivan Community Unit School District 300 is a school district based in Sullivan, Illinois, the county seat of Moultrie County, Illinois. It is administrated by a Board of Education and Superintendent. The current Superintendent of Sullivan Community Unit School District 300 is Ted Walk who started in August 2017.

== History ==
In the 2018–19 academic school year Sullivan School District moved the 5th Grade to the Middle School building, because of the growing enrollment in the Elementary School. By doing so, this makes the Elementary School K-4 and Middle School 5–8.

== Athletics ==
Sullivan's Middle School athletics participate in the Junior High Okaw Valley Conference and are members of the Illinois Elementary School Association. Sullivan's High School athletics participate in the Lincoln Prairie Conference and are members of the Illinois High School Association.

=== Boys ===
- Baseball
- Basketball
- Cross Country
- Football
- Golf
- Swimming & Diving
- Track & Field

=== Girls ===
- Basketball
- Cheerleading
- Cross Country
- Golf
- Softball
- Swimming & Diving
- Track & Field
- Volleyball

== Extracurricular actives ==
- Band
- Bass Fishing
- Color Guard
- FCA
- FCCLA
- FFA
- Mirror Images
- NEHS
- NHS
- Scholastic Bowl
- Singers/Singers Jr./Chorus
- Spanish Club
- Student Council
- Art club

== See also ==
- List of school districts in Illinois
