= The Little Theatre on the Square =

- Address: 16 E Harrison St; Sullivan, Illinois 61951; United States
- Owner: The Little Theatre On The Square, Inc.
- Capacity: 420
- Type: Non Profit
- Current use: Performing Arts

Construction
- Opened: 1957

Website
- www.thelittletheatre.org

The Little Theatre on the Square is a theater in Sullivan, Illinois, founded by Guy S. Little, Jr. in 1957. It is located in the Sullivan town square on Harrison Street.

== History ==
The theater originally opened in 1924 as a movie theater, called "The Grand Theatre." The Grand Theatre showed movies throughout the year, except during the summer months. Guy S. Little, Jr., who was originally from Sullivan, returned after graduate school and training in theater in New York, and then in 1957 began renting the theater for what was called a "Summer of Musicals at the Grand Theatre" until 1962.

In 1959, the theatre began to employ professional actors in its productions as an Equity theater. Little purchased The Grand Theatre in 1963 and changed the name to "The Little Theatre on the Square."

While Little owned the theater, productions included Guys and Dolls, starring Alan Alda in 1959, A Tree Grows in Brooklyn, starring Margaret Hamilton in 1960, Born Yesterday, starring Betty Grable in 1970, Irma La Douce, starring Lesley Ann Warren in 1973, One Flew Over the Cuckoo's Nest, starring Leonard Nimoy in 1974, and Three Goats and a Blanket, starring Mickey Rooney in 1976. Other actors who appeared in shows cast by Little included Rosemary Prinz, Tom Poston, Bill Hayes, Eve Arden, Barbara Rush, Shelley Berman, Frank Sutton, Peter Palmer, Ann Miller, Vivian Vance, Bob Cummings and Cesar Romero.

In 1979, Little leased the theater to the non-profit Sullivan Theater Inc., organized by two Eastern Illinois University professors, with Little stating this was due to the costs of hiring professional actors. The theater did not operate in 1980 because of the costs. In 1981, a nonprofit group called the Friends of the Little Theatre was organized by business and civic leaders to reopen the theater that year, and by 1985 ended the practice of casting well-known professional actors.

== 1981 - Present ==
After the non-profit Friends of the Little Theatre began operating the theater in 1981, Leonard Anderson was hired as the professional manager and M. Seth Reines was hired as the artistic director in 1988. In 1991, Little sold the theater to the Friends of the Little Theatre. By 1995, the Little Theatre had eliminated its debt and began Christmas shows.

In 1996, the Little Theatre received the designation of Established Regional Arts Institution from the Illinois Arts Council. In the following years, a dance program, children's theater, and drama classes were added. In 2000, the theater received a $300,000 grant from Illinois to purchase a nearby building for development into a technical production facility, and to renovate another building purchased by the theater.

In 2006, John J. Stephens was hired as the marketing director, and in 2008 he became the acting Executive director, assuming additional administrative responsibilities. By 2013, he was named Executive Producer, taking on the duties of the Artistic Director, as well. In addition, he directs and appears on stage. In 2010, Stephens hired Therese S. Kincade as director of Youth Programming. In 2013, when Stephens became Executive Producer, he named Kincade Associate Artistic Director. She also serves as the Casting Director and has acted, directed and written multiple shows for the theatre.

== Actors and appearances ==
Rosemary Prinz was a regular summer actress at the Little Theatre during the peak of her career. She performed in 1961, 1963–1967, 1969, 1972–1975, 1977, and 1982. She made her debut on Broadway in 1952 and had a role on the television show As the World Turns from 1956 to 1968.

John Carradine appeared twice on stage at the Little Theatre in 1965 (Oliver!) and 1966 (Dracula). He had already appeared in feature films such as The Grapes of Wrath in 1940 and The Ten Commandments in 1956. Throughout his career he appeared in 225 motion pictures.

Jonathan Frid, the resident vampire Barnabas Collins on the gothic daytime drama Dark Shadows, drew sold-out crowds when he portrayed Tony Wendice in Dial M for Murder in 1969.

Ann Miller appeared on stage in 1973 after her career had peaked. She had already appeared in 40 feature films from 1934 to 1973.

Mickey Rooney appeared at the theater in 1976 as the lead in Three Goats and a Blanket. He had already appeared in 122 films and 2 television shows.

Kitty Carlisle appeared on stage at the theater in 1978 in The Marriage-Go-Round. She had already appeared in four films and was a regular panelist on To Tell the Truth from 1957 to 1978.

In 2018, Colleen Zenk, starred as Dolly Gallagher Levi in Hello, Dolly! Zenk is best known for her role as Barbara Ryan in the daytime TV drama As the World Turns, a role she played from September 1978 until the show left the air in September 2010.

In recent years, a number of performers and artist who have appeared at The Little Theatre been featured on Broadway and in the West End (London) including Marisha Wallace (Aladdin, Something Rotten, Dreamgirls), 5 (Once, School Of Rock) and Alysha Deslorieux, (Hamilton, Once On This Island). Other actors and artists who have performed at The Little Theatre and on Broadway:

Sierra Boggess (The Phantom of the Opera, Little Mermaid, Master Class, It Shoulda Been You, School of Rock, Harmony), C.K. Edwards (Billy Elliot, Book of Mormon, After Midnight, Shuffle Along), Jesse Sharp (Beetlejuice). Lexie Dorsett Sharp (Beetlejuice), Anna McNeeley (Gypsy, CATS, Beauty and the Beast), Sam Hartley (Guttenberg, the Musical, Operation Mincemeat), Jake Morrissy (Book of Mormon). Whitney White (Director) Jaja’s African Hair Braiding, The Last Five Years, Liberation (TONY), School Girls :Or the African Mean Girls play, Josh Rhodes (Performer/Director/Choreographer) Chicago, Fosse, Sweet Smell of Success, Drowsy Chaperone, Cinderella, First Date, Bright Star, Spamalot, Jason Yarcho (Music Director) Wicked, Bright Star, Aladdin, MJ, Joshua Zecher-Ross (Music Director) The Queen of Versailles, Operation Mincemeat.

Countless actors and artists have also performed in National Touring Companies and on cruise ships.

== First season vs. now ==
The first Summer of Musicals, in 1957, featured nine shows in nine weeks with each show giving four performances, Thursday through Sunday. The tickets ranged in price from $.90 to $2.20. The final musical for the season, Guys and Dolls, sold out and was the first one to force the balcony seats to open.

The 2009 season for The Little Theatre consisted of two off season performances, in March and April, and five regular season shows. The ticket prices ranged from $26 to $28 per show and season tickets could be purchased for $100. Each summer show runs for two weeks, Tuesday through Sunday.

As of 2023, the summer season includes 5 musicals, 1 play and 3 TYA (theatre for Young Audience) shows. Ticket prices have increased slight

In the off season, there is a Christmas production. In the fall, and spring there are TYA shows, featuring actors ages 9-18 supported by a team of professional theater artists including the director, choreographer, music director, tech staff and design team.
