= Lovington, Illinois =

- Village
- Motto: "A small town with a big heart."
- Location in Moultrie County, Illinois
- Coordinates: 39°42′52″N 88°37′45″W
- Country: United States
- State: Illinois
- County: Moultrie
- Township: Lovington
- Named for: Andrew Love

Area
  - Total: 0.54 sq mi (1.41 km^{2})
  - Land: 0.54 sq mi (1.41 km^{2})
  - Water: 0 sq mi (0.00 km^{2})
- Elevation: 682 ft (208 m)

Population (2020)
  - Total: 1,069
  - Density: 1,966/sq mi (758.9/km^{2})
- Time zone: UTC-6 (CST)
  - Summer (DST): UTC-5 (CDT)
- ZIP code: 61937
- Area code: 217
- FIPS code: 17-45044
- GNIS ID: 2399193
- Website: www.lovingtonil.com

Lovington is a village in Moultrie County, Illinois, United States. The population was 1,069 at the 2020 census. Lovington was named after Andrew Love, the first postmaster in the area.

== Geography ==
Lovington is in northern Moultrie County, along Illinois Route 32, which follows South County Street and West Springfield Street through the village. IL 32 leads south 9 miles (14 km) to Sullivan, the county seat, and northwest 8 miles (13 km) to La Place. Illinois Route 133 has its western terminus at IL 32 on the southern border of Lovington; Route 133 leads east 8 miles (13 km) to Arthur.

According to the U.S. Census Bureau, Lovington has a total area of 0.54 square miles (1.40 km^{2}), all land.

== Demographics ==
Historical population
Census	Pop.	Note	%±
1880	557		—
1890	767		37.7%
1900	815		6.3%
1910	1,011		24.0%
1920	1,479		46.3%
1930	1,121		−24.2%
1940	1,215		8.4%
1950	1,152		−5.2%
1960	1,200		4.2%
1970	1,303		8.6%
1980	1,313		0.8%
1990	1,143		−12.9%
2000	1,222		6.9%
2010	1,130		−7.5%
2020	1,069		−5.4%
U.S. Decennial Census

=== 2020 census ===
As of the 2020 census, Lovington had a population of 1,069. The median age was 40.0 years. 24.4% of residents were under the age of 18 and 17.2% of residents were 65 years of age or older. For every 100 females there were 108.4 males, and for every 100 females age 18 and over there were 100.5 males age 18 and over.

0.0% of residents lived in urban areas, while 100.0% lived in rural areas.

There were 461 households in Lovington, of which 25.8% had children under the age of 18 living in them. Of all households, 44.9% were married-couple households, 22.1% were households with a male householder and no spouse or partner present, and 24.5% were households with a female householder and no spouse or partner present. About 31.5% of all households were made up of individuals and 10.2% had someone living alone who was 65 years of age or older.

There were 508 housing units, of which 9.3% were vacant. The homeowner vacancy rate was 0.6% and the rental vacancy rate was 6.0%.

Racial composition as of the 2020 census
Race	Number	Percent
White	988	92.4%
Black or African American	7	0.7%
American Indian and Alaska Native	5	0.5%
Asian	4	0.4%
Native Hawaiian and Other Pacific Islander	0	0.0%
Some other race	2	0.2%
Two or more races	63	5.9%
Hispanic or Latino (of any race)	12	1.1%

=== 2000 census ===
As of the census of 2000, there were 1,222 people, 504 households, and 338 families residing in the village. The population density was 1,518.4 inhabitants per square mile (586.3/km^{2}). There were 536 housing units at an average density of 666.0 per square mile (257.1/km^{2}). The racial makeup of the village was 98.77% White, 0.25% African American, 0.57% Native American, 0.25% Asian, and 0.16% from two or more races. Hispanic or Latino of any race were 0.33% of the population.

There were 504 households, out of which 31.5% had children under the age of 18 living with them, 54.4% were married couples living together, 7.9% had a female householder with no husband present, and 32.9% were non-families. 29.8% of all households were made up of individuals, and 16.7% had someone living alone who was 65 years of age or older. The average household size was 2.39 and the average family size was 2.95.

In the village, the population was spread out, with 25.0% under the age of 18, 9.6% from 18 to 24, 28.6% from 25 to 44, 19.4% from 45 to 64, and 17.4% who were 65 years of age or older. The median age was 37 years. For every 100 females, there were 92.4 males. For every 100 females age 18 and over, there were 86.6 males.

The median income for a household in the village was $34,115, and the median income for a family was $41,544. Males had a median income of $31,786 versus $20,800 for females. The per capita income for the village was $17,311. About 6.5% of families and 8.7% of the population were below the poverty line, including 9.8% of those under age 18 and 12.1% of those age 65 or over.

== High school ==
Lovington High School was shut down in 2012, and the building that had stood since 1909 was torn down after the district annexed into Arthur, Illinois. The new high school encompasses the surrounding towns and is called Arthur Lovington Atwood Hammond (ALAH) High School.

== Notable persons ==
- Stephen Ambrose, historian, biographer of Presidents Dwight D. Eisenhower and Richard Nixon
- Chas McFarland, a professional basketball player for the Akita Northern Happinets of Japan
- Don Shroyer, former head football coach for Millikin University
