= Lowe Township, Moultrie County, Illinois =

Lowe Township
- Township

- Location of Illinois in the United States
- Coordinates: 39°44′25″N 88°31′41″W
- Country: United States
- State: Illinois
- County: Moultrie
- Settled: November 6, 1866

Area
  - Total: 40.61 sq mi (105.2 km^{2})
  - Land: 40.61 sq mi (105.2 km^{2})
  - Water: 0 sq mi (0 km^{2})
- Elevation: 679 ft (207 m)

Population (2010)
  - Estimate (2016): 1,721
  - Density: 42.4/sq mi (16.4/km^{2})
- Time zone: UTC-6 (CST)
  - Summer (DST): UTC-5 (CDT)
- FIPS code: 17-139-45083

Lowe Township is located in Moultrie County, Illinois. As of the 2010 census, its population was 1,723 and it contained 615 housing units.

== Geography ==
According to the 2010 census, the township has a total area of 40.61 square miles (105.2 km^{2}), all land.

== Demographics ==
Historical population
Census	Pop.	Note	%±
2010	1,723		—
2020	1,740		1.0%
2016 (est.)	1,721		−0.1%
U.S. Decennial Census

According to the 2010 United States census, Lowe Township had a population of 1,723 and 615 housing units. The population density was approximately 42.4 people per square mile (16.4/km²).

The township's racial composition in 2010 was 98.96% White, 0.12% African American, 0.35% Asian, 0.12% from other races, and 0.46% from two or more races. Hispanic or Latino residents of any race accounted for 1.57% of the population.

The population was recorded as 1,740 in the 2020 United States census, compared with 1,723 in 2010.

According to the American Community Survey 2024 five-year estimates, the township had an estimated population of 1,775 and approximately 676 households. The median age was 39.2 years, and the average household size was 2.6 people.

The estimated median household income was $85,000, while per capita income was $31,304. Approximately 12.6% of residents lived below the poverty threshold. Among residents aged 25 and over, 68.2% had completed high school or attained a higher qualification, and 15.6% held a bachelor's degree or higher.

Historical population
Census	Pop.	Note	%±
2016 (est.)	1,721
U.S. Decennial Census
