= Lake Shelbyville =

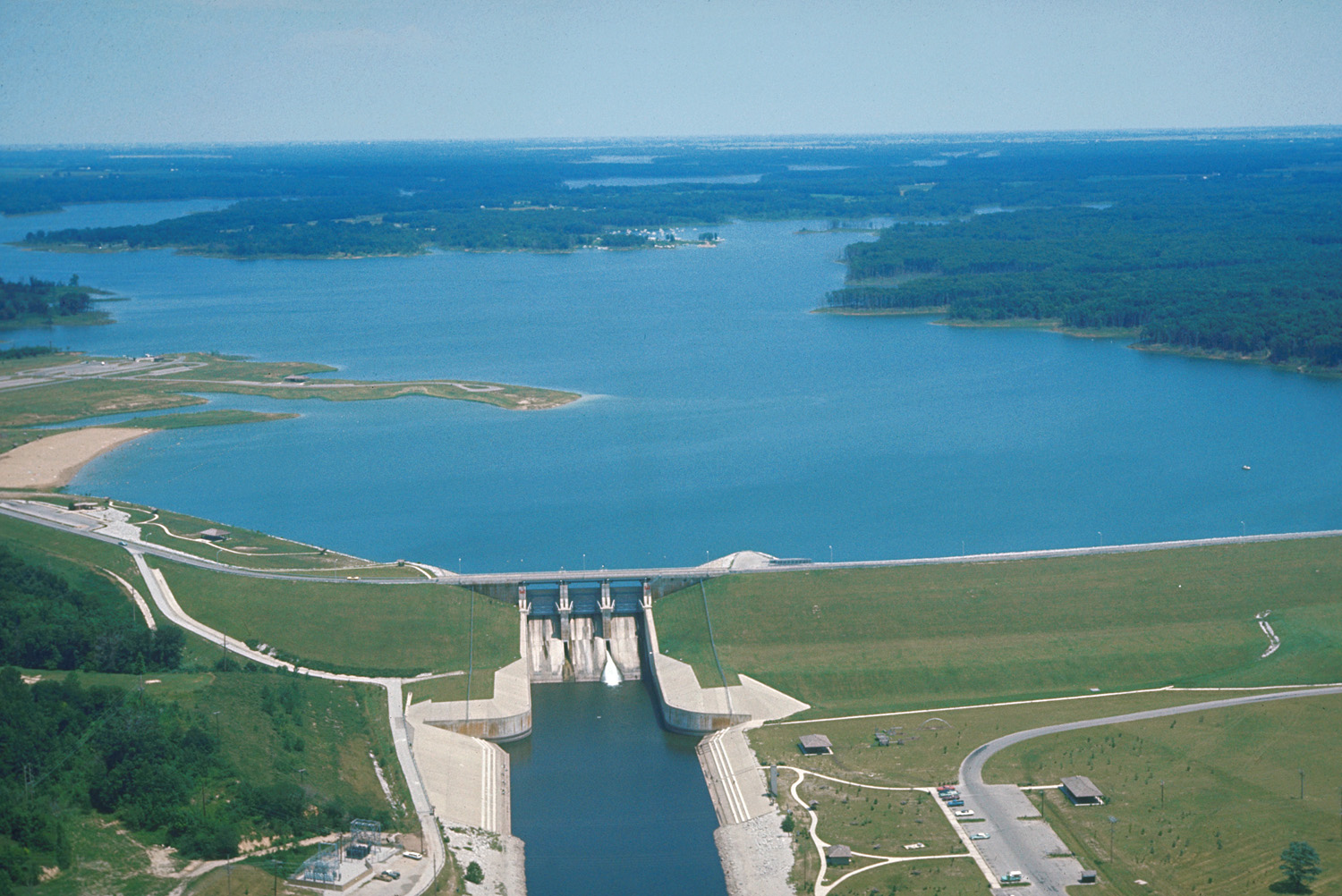
- Shelbyville Lake and Dam on the Kaskaskia River

- Location within Illinois Location within the United States
- Location: Shelby / Moultrie counties, Illinois, United States
- Coordinates: 39°28′18″N 88°42′50″W
- Type: Reservoir
- Primary inflows: Kaskaskia River; West Okaw River
- Primary outflows: Kaskaskia River
- Basin countries: United States
- Surface area: 11,100 acres (44.9 km^{2}) (normal pool)
- Average depth: 18.9 ft (5.8 m)
- Max. depth: 67 ft (20.4 m)
- Surface elevation: 183 meters (600.4 ft)
- Settlements: Shelbyville, Illinois

Lake Shelbyville is a reservoir located in Shelby County, Illinois and Moultrie County, Illinois created by damming the Kaskaskia River at Shelbyville, Illinois. The lake's normal surface pool is 11,100 acres (44.9 km^{2}) at an elevation of 183 meters (600.4 ft). The area that surrounds the lake is the Shelbyville State Fish and Wildlife Area. The lake is managed by the United States Army Corps of Engineers, and the wildlife is managed by the Illinois Department of Natural Resources.

$57 million was appropriated for the dam and lake project. Groundbreaking on the dam occurred May 4, 1963. Filling of the reservoir began August 1, 1970. The lake was officially dedicated September 12, 1970. The dam is 3,025 feet (922.0 m) long and 108 feet (32.9 m) tall with normal pool height 17 feet (5.2 m) below the top.

Bordering the lake are two state parks: Wolf Creek State Park and Eagle Creek State Park; and five different federal campgrounds including Coon Creek, Opossum Creek, Lithia Springs, Lone Point, and Forest (Bo) Woods. There is also Wilburn Creek and Whitley Creek Recreational Area. Lake Shelbyville's shoreline is heavily wooded and subject to severe erosion. Man-made beaches are located at Dam West (Shelbyville), Wilborn Creek, Wolf Creek State Park, and Sullivan Beach. Aside from the main channel of the lake are many coves, suited for fishing. The lake is deeper than other major lakes in Illinois, so it is popular with boaters during the summer.

There are full-service marinas, resorts and campgrounds on the lake. There are three full service marinas in business: Findlay, Lithia Springs, and Sullivan Marina. Findlay Marina is located north of Marker 5 just past the bridge on the west side of the lake. Sullivan Marina and Campground is located 4 miles south of Sullivan and includes hotel suites. Lithia Springs Marina is located on the southern end of Lake Shelbvyille.

== See also ==
- Murder of Karyn Hearn Slover, as portions of her body were discovered in Lake Shelbyville
- Carlyle Lake, as this is the other primary reservoir in the Kaskaskia River system
