= Marrowbone Township, Moultrie County, Illinois =

Marrowbone Township
- Township

- Location of Illinois in the United States
- Coordinates: 39°38′12″N 88°45′30″W
- Country: United States
- State: Illinois
- County: Moultrie
- Settled: November 6, 1866

Area
  - Total: 39.54 sq mi (102.4 km^{2})
  - Land: 38.98 sq mi (101.0 km^{2})
  - Water: 0.56 sq mi (1.5 km^{2})
- Elevation: 656 ft (200 m)

Population (2010)
  - Estimate (2016): 1,687
  - Density: 44.4/sq mi (17.1/km^{2})
- Time zone: UTC-6 (CST)
  - Summer (DST): UTC-5 (CDT)
- FIPS code: 17-139-47124

Marrowbone Township is located in Moultrie County, Illinois. As of the 2010 census, its population was 1,730 and it contained 751 housing units.

== History ==
What is now Marrowbone Twp. was part of Shelby County when first settled in 1828. Upon establishment of Moultrie County in 1843, the township formed part of Thomason Precinct. Marrowbone Twp. was established on November 6, 1866, when the County adopted townships as its basic subdivision.

== Geography ==
According to the 2010 census, the township has a total area of 39.54 square miles (102.4 km^{2}), of which 38.98 square miles (101.0 km^{2}) (or 98.58%) is land and 0.56 square miles (1.5 km^{2}) (or 1.42%) is water.

== Demographics ==
Historical population
Census	Pop.	Note	%±
2016 (est.)	1,687
U.S. Decennial Census
