= Dora Township, Illinois =

Dora Township
- Township

- Location of Illinois in the United States
- Coordinates: 39°43′57″N 88°44′54″W
- Country: United States
- State: Illinois
- County: Moultrie
- Settled: November 6, 1866

Area
  - Total: 35.04 sq mi (90.8 km^{2})
  - Land: 35.04 sq mi (90.8 km^{2})
  - Water: 0 sq mi (0 km^{2})
- Elevation: 702 ft (214 m)

Population (2010)
  - Estimate (2016): 784
  - Density: 22.9/sq mi (8.8/km^{2})
- Time zone: UTC-6 (CST)
  - Summer (DST): UTC-5 (CDT)
- FIPS code: 17-139-20344

Dora Township is located in Moultrie County, Illinois. As of the 2010 census, its population was 802 and it contained 339 housing units. It contains the census-designated place of Lake City.

== Geography ==
According to the 2010 census, the township has a total area of 35.04 square miles (90.8 km^{2}), all land.

== Demographics ==
Historical population
Census	Pop.	Note	%±
2016 (est.)	784
U.S. Decennial Census
