= Lovington Township, Moultrie County, Illinois =

Lovington Township
- Township

- Location of Illinois in the United States
- Coordinates: 39°43′48″N 88°38′38″W
- Country: United States
- State: Illinois
- County: Moultrie
- Settled: November 6, 1866

Area
  - Total: 52.49 sq mi (135.9 km^{2})
  - Land: 52.48 sq mi (135.9 km^{2})
  - Water: 0.02 sq mi (0.052 km^{2})
- Elevation: 673 ft (205 m)

Population (2010)
  - Estimate (2016): 1,591
  - Density: 30.9/sq mi (11.9/km^{2})
- Time zone: UTC-6 (CST)
  - Summer (DST): UTC-5 (CDT)
- FIPS code: 17-139-45057

Lovington Township is located in Moultrie County, Illinois. As of the 2010 census, its population was 1,623 and it contained 744 housing units.

== Geography ==
According to the 2010 census, the township has a total area of 52.49 square miles (135.9 km^{2}), of which 52.48 square miles (135.9 km^{2}) (or 99.98%) is land and 0.02 square miles (0.052 km^{2}) (or 0.04%) is water.

== Demographics ==
Historical population
| Census | Pop. | Note | %± |
|---|---|---|---|
| 2016 (est.) | 1,591 |
U.S. Decennial Census
