= East Nelson Township, Moultrie County, Illinois =

East Nelson Township
- Township

- Location of Illinois in the United States
- Coordinates: 39°33′58″N 88°32′03″W
- Country: United States
- State: Illinois
- County: Moultrie
- Settled: November 6, 1866

Area
  - Total: 36.68 sq mi (95.0 km^{2})
  - Land: 35.88 sq mi (92.9 km^{2})
  - Water: 0.8 sq mi (2.1 km^{2})
- Elevation: 623 ft (190 m)

Population (2010)
  - Estimate (2016): 1,065
  - Density: 29.4/sq mi (11.4/km^{2})
- Time zone: UTC-6 (CST)
  - Summer (DST): UTC-5 (CDT)
- FIPS code: 17-139-22099

East Nelson Township is located in Moultrie County, Illinois. As of the 2010 census, its population was 1,055 and it contained 396 housing units.

== Geography ==
According to the 2010 census, the township has a total area of 36.68 square miles (95.0 km^{2}), of which 35.88 square miles (92.9 km^{2}) (or 97.82%) is land and 0.8 square miles (2.1 km^{2}) (or 2.18%) is water.

== Demographics ==
Historical population
| Census | Pop. | Note | %± |
|---|---|---|---|
| 2016 (est.) | 1,065 |
U.S. Decennial Census
