= Steve Buxton (American football) =

American football player (born 1961)

Profile
- Position: Offensive Tackle

Personal information
- Born: December 23, 1961 (age 64); Sullivan, Illinois, U.S.
- Listed height: 6 ft 6 in (1.98 m)
- Listed weight: 269 lb (122 kg)

Career information
- High school: Sullivan (Sullivan, Illinois)
- College: Indiana State
- NFL draft: 1985: 8th round, 217th overall pick

Career history
- Chicago Bears (1985)*; Birmingham Stallions (1985)*
- * Offseason or practice squad member only

Awards and highlights
- First-team All-MVC (1984); Second-team All-MVC (1983)

Steve Buxton (born December 23, 1961) is an American former professional football offensive tackle in the National Football League (NFL). He played college football at Indiana State University. He was selected by the Chicago Bears in the eighth round of the 1985 NFL draft with the 217th overall pick.

Buxton was also selected in the fifth round with the 63rd overall pick in the 1985 USFL draft by the Birmingham Stallions.

Buxton is the only player from Sullivan, Illinois to ever be drafted into the NFL. Buxton lettered all four years at Indiana State from 1981 to 1984. While at Indiana State Buxton was a part of the 1983 and 1984 Sycamore I-AA playoff teams. In 2002 the 1984 Indiana State Sycamores football team was inducted into the Indiana State University Athletics Hall of Fame.
