= Bourbon, Illinois =

- Unincorporated community
- Location within Illinois Location within the United States
- Coordinates: 39°44′44″N 88°22′44″W
- Country: United States
- State: Illinois
- County: Douglas
- Elevation: 659 ft (201 m)
- Time zone: UTC-6 (Central (CST))
  - Summer (DST): UTC-5 (CDT)
- Area code: 217
- GNIS feature ID: 404720

Bourbon is an unincorporated community in Douglas County, Illinois, United States. Bourbon is 5.5 miles (8.9 km) northwest of Arcola.
