= Whitley Township, Moultrie County, Illinois =

Whitley Township
- Township

- Location of Illinois in the United States
- Coordinates: 39°29′18″N 88°32′38″W
- Country: United States
- State: Illinois
- County: Moultrie
- Settled: November 6, 1866

Area
  - Total: 36.72 sq mi (95.1 km^{2})
  - Land: 36.72 sq mi (95.1 km^{2})
  - Water: 0 sq mi (0 km^{2})
- Elevation: 676 ft (206 m)

Population (2010)
  - Estimate (2016): 656
  - Density: 18/sq mi (6.9/km^{2})
- Time zone: UTC-6 (CST)
  - Summer (DST): UTC-5 (CDT)
- FIPS code: 17-139-81451

Whitley Township is located in Moultrie County, Illinois, United States. As of the 2010 census, its population was 660 and it contained 278 housing units.

== Geography ==
According to the 2010 census, the township has a total area of 36.72 square miles (95.1 km^{2}), all land.

== Demographics ==
Historical population
Census	Pop.	Note	%±
2016 (est.)	656
U.S. Decennial Census
