= Illinois Route 133 =

East-west state highway in Illinois, US

Illinois Route 133
- IL 133 highlighted in red

Route information
- Maintained by IDOT
- Length: 52.05 mi (83.77 km)
- Existed: 1924 (completed 1942)–present

Major junctions
- West end: IL 32 in Lovington
- I-57 / US 45 in Arcola; IL 130 near Hindsboro; IL 49 in western Edgar County
- East end: US 150 / IL 1 / IL 16 in Paris

Location
- Country: United States
- State: Illinois
- Counties: Moultrie, Douglas, Coles, Edgar

Highway system
- Illinois State Highway System; Interstate; US; State; Tollways; Scenic
← IL 132	→ IL 134

Illinois Route 133 is an east–west state highway in east-central Illinois. It runs from Illinois Route 32 in Lovington to U.S. Route 150 and Illinois Route 1 in Paris. Illinois Route 16 terminates with Illinois 133 at this point. This is a distance of 52.05 miles (83.77 km). Illinois 133 is the main state road through Illinois Amish Country.

== Route description ==
Illinois 133 is a two-lane undivided surface state highway for its entire length. It overlaps Illinois 16 when both roads terminate at U.S. 150/Illinois 1 in Paris. U.S. 150 runs north and east from this intersection, while Illinois 1 runs north and south. The Illinois 16/133 combination runs west.

== History ==
SBI Route 133 was the same as Illinois 133 is today, though the eastern portion of the road from Redmon to Paris was not completed until 1942. In 1953 it was extended west to Decatur along Illinois 32; this was rescinded in 1972.

== Major Intersections ==
County	Location	mi	km	Destinations	Notes
Moultrie	Lovington	0.0	0.0	IL 32 – Sullivan, Decatur	Western terminus of IL 133
Douglas	Arcola	18.0	29.0	US 45 (Chestnut St) – Champaign, Mattoon	
Douglas	Arcola	18.9	30.4	I-57 – Champaign, Effingham	I-57 exit 203
Douglas		25.0	40.2	IL 130	
Coles	No major junctions				
Edgar		38.2	61.5	IL 49 – Casey, Kankakee	
Edgar	Paris	49.6	79.8	CR 14 (North 950th Road)	
Edgar	Paris	51.1	82.2	IL 16 west – Charleston	West end of IL 16 concurrency
Edgar	Paris	52.05	83.77	US 150 west / IL 1 (Central Avenue, Main Street) – Marshall, Danville IL 16 ends	Eastern termi of IL 133 and IL 16
Edgar	Paris	52.05	83.77	US 150 east – Terre Haute	Continuation beyond IL 1
1.000 mi = 1.609 km; 1.000 km = 0.621 mi: Concurrency terminus
