= Moultrie County, Illinois =

County in Illinois, United States

- County
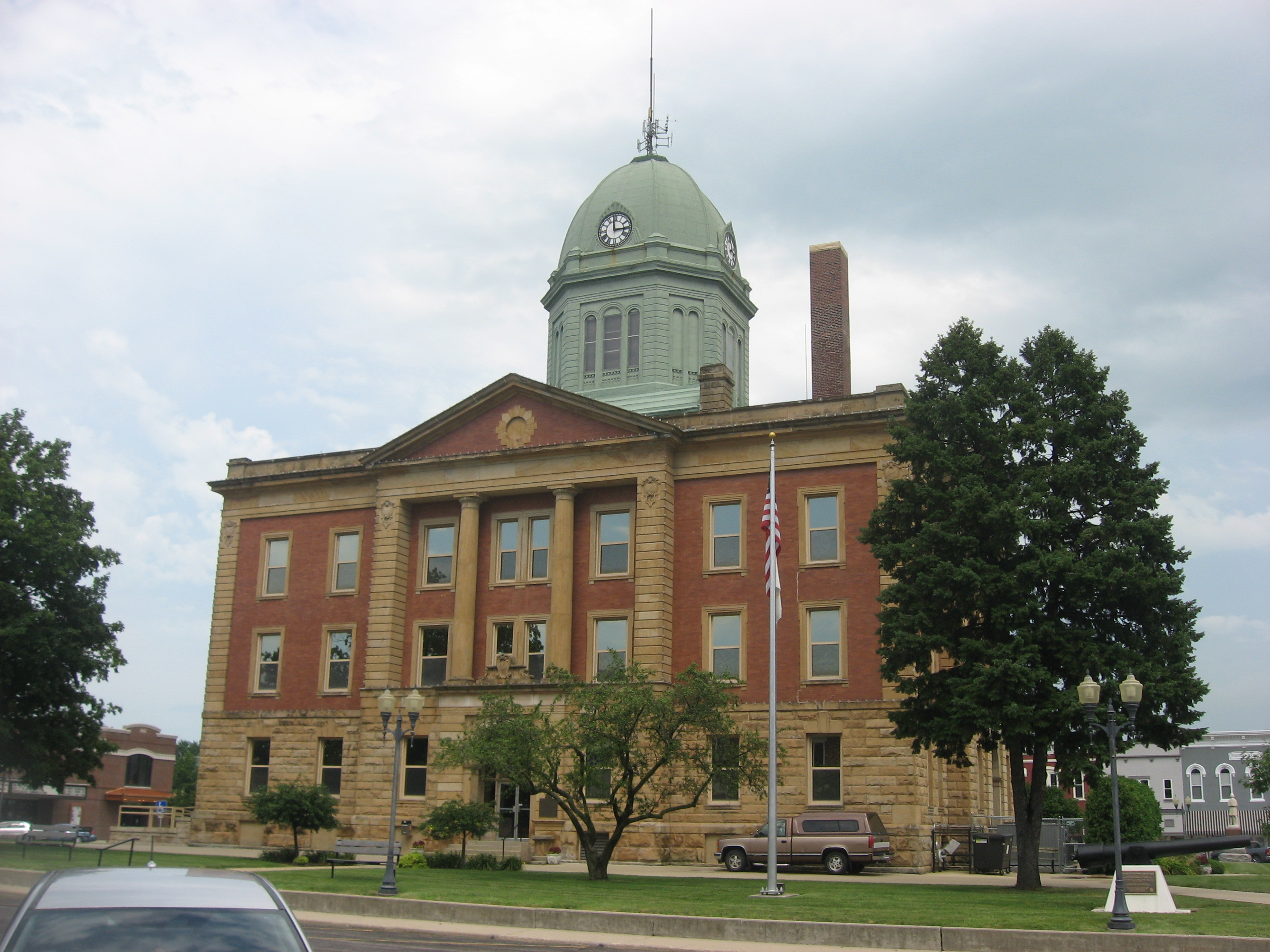
- Moultrie County Courthouse in Sullivan

- Flag

- Location within the U.S. state of Illinois
- Coordinates: 39°38′N 88°37′W
- Country: United States
- State: Illinois
- Founded: February 16, 1843
- Named for: William Moultrie
- Seat: Sullivan
- Largest city: Sullivan

Area
  - Total: 344 sq mi (890 km^{2})
  - Land: 336 sq mi (870 km^{2})
  - Water: 8.5 sq mi (22 km^{2}) 2.5%

Population (2020)
  - Total: 14,526
  - Estimate (2025): 14,371 ▼
  - Density: 42.8/sq mi (16.5/km^{2})
- Time zone: UTC−6 (Central)
  - Summer (DST): UTC−5 (CDT)
- Congressional district: 15th
- Website: www.moultriecountyil.com

Moultrie County is a county in the U.S. state of Illinois. According to the 2020 United States census, its population was 14,526. Its county seat is Sullivan. The name is pronounced as in "mole tree", unlike the pronunciation of its namesake, the South Carolinian Revolutionary War hero William Moultrie.

== History ==
Moultrie County was formed in 1843 with areas taken from Shelby and Macon counties. It is named for South Carolina General, and later Governor, William Moultrie. General Moultrie defended Sullivan's Island, South Carolina during the Battle of Sullivan's Island on June 28, 1776. The site was later renamed Fort Moultrie. Nearby Jasper County was named for Sgt. William Jasper, another hero of the defense of Sullivan's Island.

The official flag of the county is the Moultrie Flag, which was flown over the new fortress on Sullivan's Island, when Moultrie defended it, and was designed by Moultrie. It went on to become iconic of liberty in the South.

When Abraham Kellar of Lovington, John Cook of Marrowbone, and John Fleming of Nelson proposed the formation of a new county from Macon, Shelby, and Coles counties, Macon gave up a strip of “worthless swamp” that is now among the most fertile land in the world, but Shelby and Coles voters refused to give up any land. Finally, Shelby County gave up some of its land to make a zig-zag border with Moultrie County.

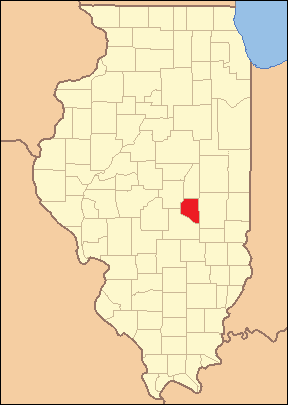
Moultrie County at the time of its creation in 1843

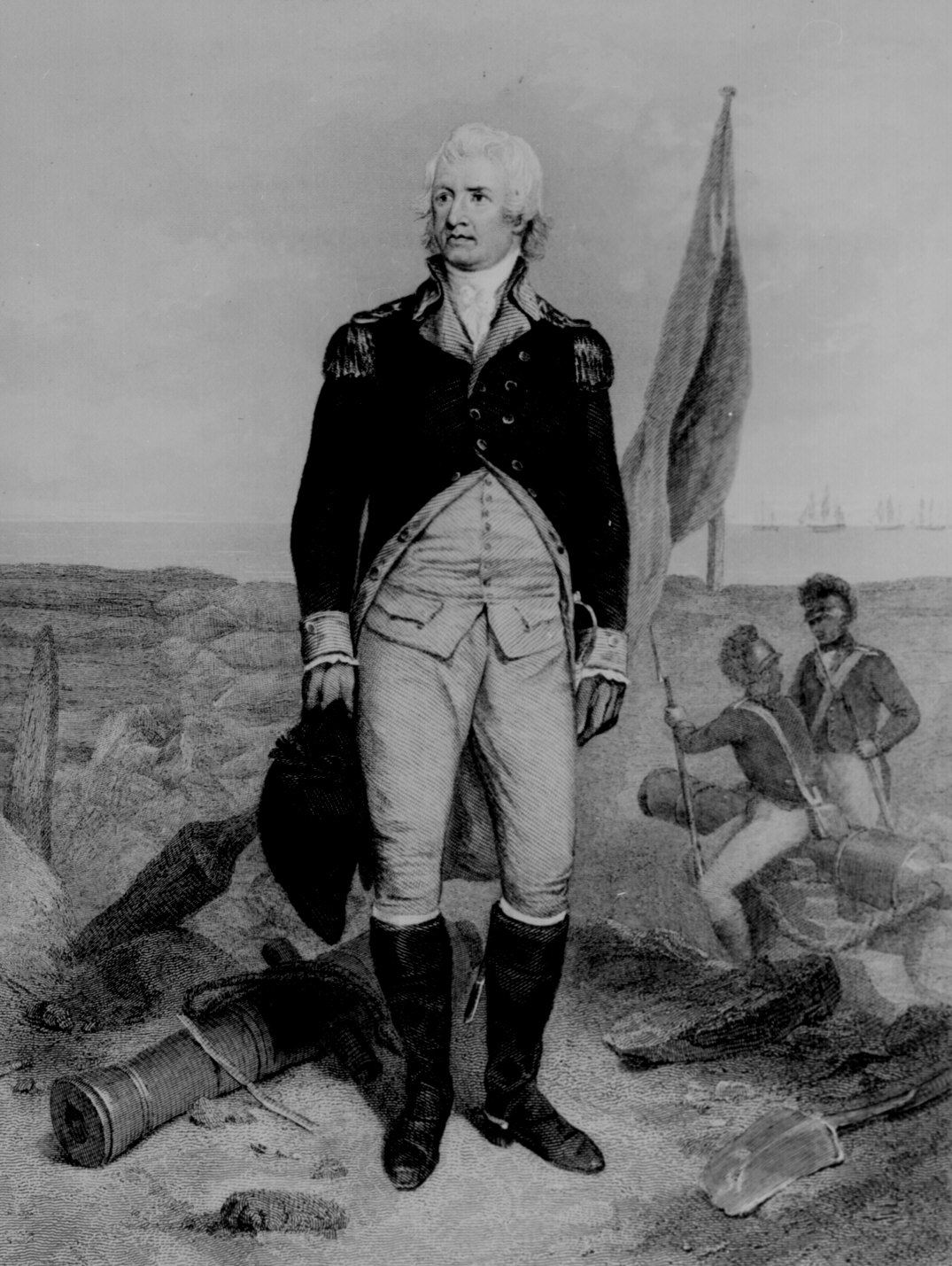
William Moultrie, whom the county was named after

== Geography ==
According to the US Census Bureau, the county has a total area of 344 square miles (890 km^{2}), of which 336 square miles (870 km^{2}) is land and 8.5 square miles (22 km^{2}) (2.5%) is water.

=== Climate and weather ===
Sullivan, Illinois

Climate chart (precipitation, max. and min. temperature)
J	F	M	A	M	J	J	A	S	O	N	D
2 34 19	1.9 41 24	3.3 52 33	3.7 65 43	4 75 53	4.1 83 62	4 87 66	3.3 85 63	3.1 80 56	3.1 68 45	3.9 52 35	3 39 24
- █ Average max. and min. temperatures in °F
- █ Precipitation totals in inches
- Source: The Weather Channel
Metric conversion
J	F	M	A	M	J	J	A	S	O	N	D
51 1 −7	48 5 −4	84 11 1	94 18 6	101 24 12	103 28 17	102 31 19	83 29 17	77 27 13	78 20 7	98 11 2	76 4 −4
- █ Average max. and min. temperatures in °C
- █ Precipitation totals in mm

In recent years, average temperatures in the county seat of Sullivan have ranged from a low of 19 °F (−7 °C) in January to a high of 87 °F (31 °C) in July, although a record low of −26 °F (−32 °C) was recorded in January 1915 and a record high of 111 °F (44 °C) was recorded in July 1936. Average monthly precipitation ranged from 1.89 inches (48 mm) in February to 4.05 inches (103 mm) in June.

=== Major highways ===
- U.S. Route 36
- Illinois Route 16
- Illinois Route 32
- Illinois Route 121
- Illinois Route 133

=== Adjacent counties ===
- Piatt County - north
- Douglas County - east
- Coles County - southeast
- Shelby County - south
- Macon County - northwest

== Demographics ==
Historical population
Census	Pop.	Note	%±
1850	3,234		—
1860	6,385		97.4%
1870	10,385		62.6%
1880	13,699		31.9%
1890	14,481		5.7%
1900	15,224		5.1%
1910	14,630		−3.9%
1920	14,839		1.4%
1930	13,247		−10.7%
1940	13,477		1.7%
1950	13,171		−2.3%
1960	13,635		3.5%
1970	13,263		−2.7%
1980	14,546		9.7%
1990	13,930		−4.2%
2000	14,287		2.6%
2010	14,846		3.9%
2020	14,526		−2.2%
2025 (est.)	14,371	▼	−1.1%
US Decennial Census:

=== 2020 census ===
As of the 2020 census, the county had a population of 14,526. The median age was 41.1 years, 24.7% of residents were under the age of 18, and 20.9% were 65 years of age or older. For every 100 females there were 96.2 males, and for every 100 females age 18 and over there were 92.8 males age 18 and over.

The racial makeup of the county was 95.1% White, 0.6% Black or African American, 0.2% American Indian and Alaska Native, 0.3% Asian, <0.1% Native Hawaiian and Pacific Islander, 0.6% from some other race, and 3.2% from two or more races. Hispanic or Latino residents of any race comprised 1.3% of the population.

30.4% of residents lived in urban areas, while 69.6% lived in rural areas.

There were 5,662 households in the county, of which 29.6% had children under the age of 18 living in them. Of all households, 54.8% were married-couple households, 16.1% were households with a male householder and no spouse or partner present, and 23.6% were households with a female householder and no spouse or partner present. About 27.1% of all households were made up of individuals and 13.3% had someone living alone who was 65 years of age or older.

There were 6,159 housing units, of which 8.1% were vacant. Among occupied housing units, 75.6% were owner-occupied and 24.4% were renter-occupied. The homeowner vacancy rate was 2.1% and the rental vacancy rate was 7.5%.

=== Racial and ethnic composition ===
Moultrie County, Illinois – Racial and ethnic composition Note: the US Census treats Hispanic/Latino as an ethnic category. This table excludes Latinos from the racial categories and assigns them to a separate category. Hispanics/Latinos may be of any race.
Race / Ethnicity (NH = Non-Hispanic)	Pop 1980	Pop 1990	Pop 2000	Pop 2010	Pop 2020	% 1980	% 1990	% 2000	% 2010	% 2020
White alone (NH)	14,432	13,849	14,078	14,524	13,747	99.22%	99.42%	98.54%	97.83%	94.64%
Black or African American alone (NH)	11	8	28	40	84	0.08%	0.06%	0.20%	0.27%	0.58%
Native American or Alaska Native alone (NH)	12	22	24	28	26	0.08%	0.16%	0.17%	0.19%	0.18%
Asian alone (NH)	13	13	14	29	49	0.09%	0.09%	0.10%	0.20%	0.34%
Native Hawaiian or Pacific Islander alone (NH)	x	x	7	0	0	x	x	0.05%	0.00%	0.00%
Other race alone (NH)	9	0	4	13	25	0.06%	0.00%	0.03%	0.09%	0.17%
Mixed race or Multiracial (NH)	x	x	64	83	401	x	x	0.45%	0.56%	2.76%
Hispanic or Latino (any race)	69	38	68	129	194	0.47%	0.27%	0.48%	0.87%	1.34%
Total	14,546	13,930	14,287	14,846	14,526	100.00%	100.00%	100.00%	100.00%	100.00%

=== 2010 census ===
As of the 2010 United States census, there were 14,846 people, 5,758 households, and 4,053 families living in the county. The population density was 44.2 inhabitants per square mile (17.1/km^{2}). There were 6,260 housing units at an average density of 18.6 per square mile (7.2/km^{2}). The racial makeup of the county was 98.5% white, 0.3% black or African American, 0.2% Asian, 0.2% American Indian, 0.2% from other races, and 0.6% from two or more races. Those of Hispanic or Latino origin made up 0.9% of the population. In terms of ancestry, 23.8% were German, 12.0% were Irish, 11.4% were American, and 10.9% were English.

Of the 5,758 households, 31.8% had children under the age of 18 living with them, 57.6% were married couples living together, 8.9% had a female householder with no husband present, 29.6% were non-families, and 25.5% of all households were made up of individuals. The average household size was 2.51 and the average family size was 3.01. The median age was 40.3 years.

The median income for a household in the county was $46,364 and the median income for a family was $54,494. Males had a median income of $42,581 versus $26,799 for females. The per capita income for the county was $22,954. About 6.2% of families and 11.0% of the population were below the poverty line, including 17.2% of those under age 18 and 6.7% of those age 65 or over.

== Communities ==
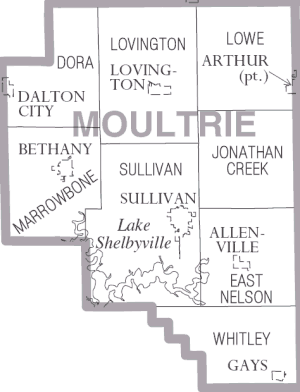
Map of Moultrie County, Illinois

=== City ===
- Sullivan (seat)

=== Villages ===
- Allenville
- Arthur (partial)
- Bethany
- Dalton City
- Gays
- Lovington

=== Census-designated place ===
- Lake City

=== Unincorporated communities ===
- Bruce
- Dunn
- Fuller
- Kirksville

=== Townships ===
- Dora
- East Nelson
- Jonathan Creek
- Lovington
- Lowe
- Marrowbone
- Sullivan
- Whitley

== Education ==
The following school districts have territory in the county:

- Arthur-Lovington/Atwood-Hammond Community Unit School District 305
- Cerro Gordo Community Unit School District 100
- Mattoon Community Unit School District 2
- Mount Zion Community Unit School District 3
- Okaw Valley Community Unit School District 302
- Sullivan Community Unit School District 300
- Windsor Community Unit School District 1

== Politics ==
Moultrie County voters have voted for the Republican Party candidate in eight of the last ten national election campaigns.

United States presidential election results for Moultrie County, Illinois
Year	Republican		Democratic		Third party(ies)	
Year	No.	%	No.	%	No.	%
1892	1,287	39.17%	1,670	50.82%	329	10.01%
1896	1,711	44.79%	2,077	54.37%	32	0.84%
1900	1,728	45.86%	1,975	52.42%	65	1.73%
1904	1,719	50.60%	1,470	43.27%	208	6.12%
1908	1,704	48.44%	1,695	48.18%	119	3.38%
1912	853	26.69%	1,501	46.96%	842	26.35%
1916	2,933	44.95%	3,370	51.65%	222	3.40%
1920	3,279	55.76%	2,513	42.73%	89	1.51%
1924	3,001	53.10%	2,403	42.52%	248	4.39%
1928	3,310	60.31%	2,168	39.50%	10	0.18%
1932	2,353	35.40%	4,219	63.48%	74	1.11%
1936	3,074	42.41%	4,110	56.70%	65	0.90%
1940	3,636	49.32%	3,696	50.13%	41	0.56%
1944	3,180	52.31%	2,853	46.93%	46	0.76%
1948	3,043	49.39%	3,037	49.29%	81	1.31%
1952	3,880	59.12%	2,675	40.76%	8	0.12%
1956	3,756	57.65%	2,751	42.23%	8	0.12%
1960	3,752	54.93%	3,079	45.07%	0	0.00%
1964	2,493	40.04%	3,733	59.96%	0	0.00%
1968	3,094	50.50%	2,447	39.94%	586	9.56%
1972	3,143	57.07%	2,350	42.67%	14	0.25%
1976	2,803	45.44%	3,332	54.01%	34	0.55%
1980	3,495	56.73%	2,332	37.85%	334	5.42%
1984	3,593	59.17%	2,458	40.48%	21	0.35%
1988	3,167	50.98%	3,013	48.50%	32	0.52%
1992	2,065	31.94%	3,056	47.27%	1,344	20.79%
1996	2,199	40.34%	2,629	48.23%	623	11.43%
2000	3,058	53.41%	2,529	44.17%	138	2.41%
2004	4,028	62.30%	2,388	36.93%	50	0.77%
2008	3,471	55.33%	2,668	42.53%	134	2.14%
2012	3,784	62.29%	2,144	35.29%	147	2.42%
2016	4,455	70.91%	1,481	23.57%	347	5.52%
2020	4,964	73.48%	1,662	24.60%	130	1.92%
2024	4,816	73.56%	1,615	24.67%	116	1.77%

== See also ==
- National Register of Historic Places listings in Moultrie County
