= La Place, Illinois =

La Place
- Census-designated place (CDP)
- Location within Illinois
- Coordinates: 39°48′00″N 88°43′03″W
- Country: United States
- State: Illinois
- County: Piatt
- Township: Cerro Gordo

Area
  - Total: 0.65 sq mi (1.69 km^{2})
  - Land: 0.65 sq mi (1.69 km^{2})
  - Water: 0 sq mi (0.00 km^{2})
- Elevation: 705 ft (215 m)

Population (2020)
  - Total: 239
  - Density: 366.0/sq mi (141.32/km^{2})
- Time zone: UTC-6 (Central (CST))
  - Summer (DST): UTC-5 (CDT)
- ZIP code: 61936
- FIPS code: 17-42067
- GNIS feature ID: 411659

La Place is a census-designated place and unincorporated community in Cerro Gordo Township, Piatt County, Illinois, United States. As of the 2010 census, its population was 259.

== Demographics ==
Historical population
| Census | Pop. | Note | %± |
|---|---|---|---|
| 2020 | 239 | | — |
U.S. Decennial Census
