= Sullivan Township, Moultrie County, Illinois =

Sullivan Township
- Township

- Location of Illinois in the United States
- Coordinates: 39°35′11″N 88°39′18″W
- Country: United States
- State: Illinois
- County: Moultrie
- Settled: November 6, 1866

Area
  - Total: 66.61 sq mi (172.5 km^{2})
  - Land: 59.46 sq mi (154.0 km^{2})
  - Water: 7.15 sq mi (18.5 km^{2})
- Elevation: 673 ft (205 m)

Population (2010)
  - Estimate (2016): 6,319
  - Density: 105.3/sq mi (40.7/km^{2})
- Time zone: UTC-6 (CST)
  - Summer (DST): UTC-5 (CDT)
- FIPS code: 17-139-73508

Sullivan Township is located in Moultrie County, Illinois. As of the 2010 census, its population was 6,263 and it contained 2,872 housing units.

== Geography ==
According to the 2010 census, the township has a total area of 66.61 square miles (172.5 km^{2}), of which 59.46 square miles (154.0 km^{2}) (or 89.27%) is land and 7.15 square miles (18.5 km^{2}) (or 10.73%) is water.

== Demographics ==
Historical population
Census	Pop.	Note	%±
2016 (est.)	6,319
U.S. Decennial Census
