= Kaskaskia River =

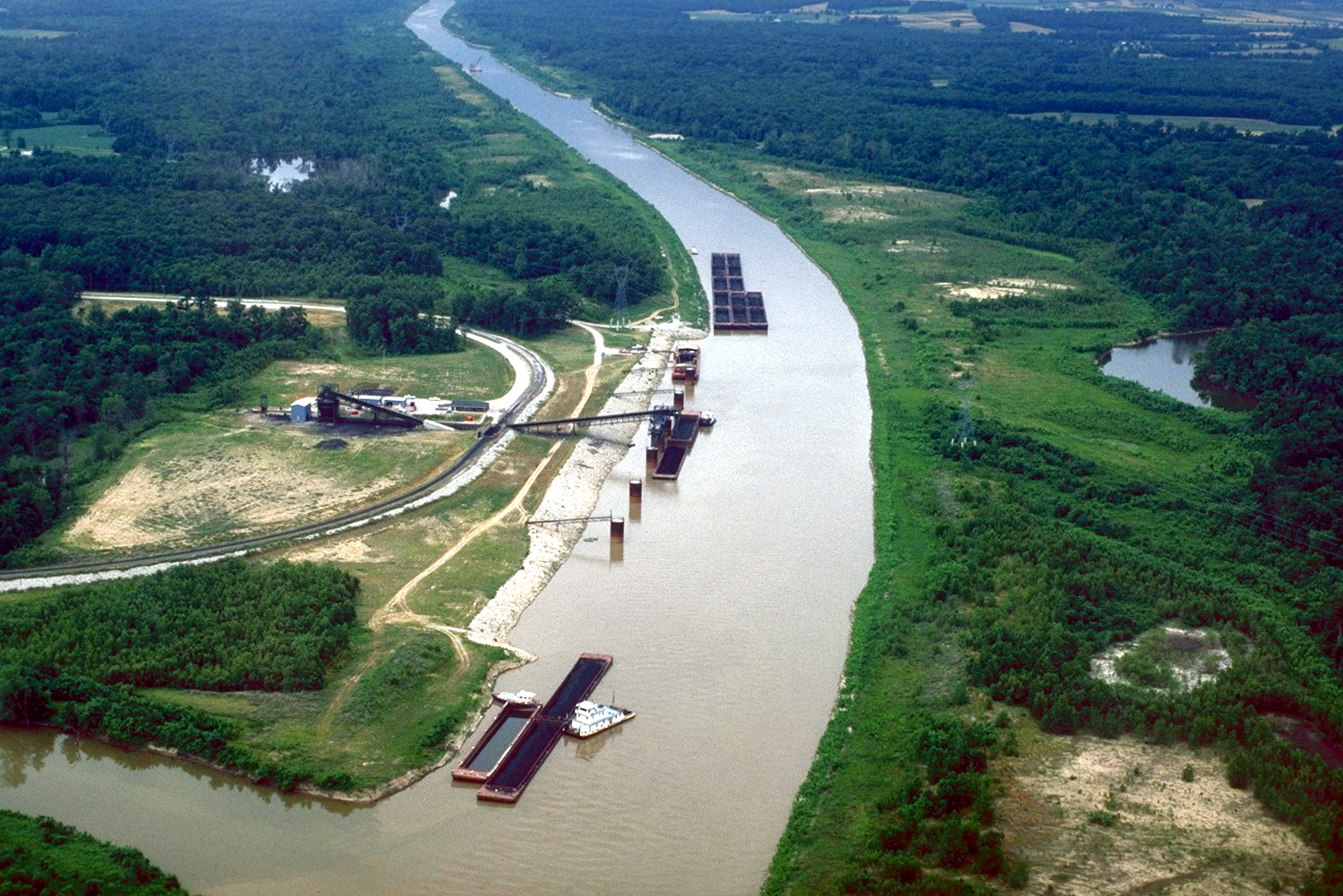
- A coal loading facility on the Kaskaskia River near New Athens in St. Clair County, Illinois

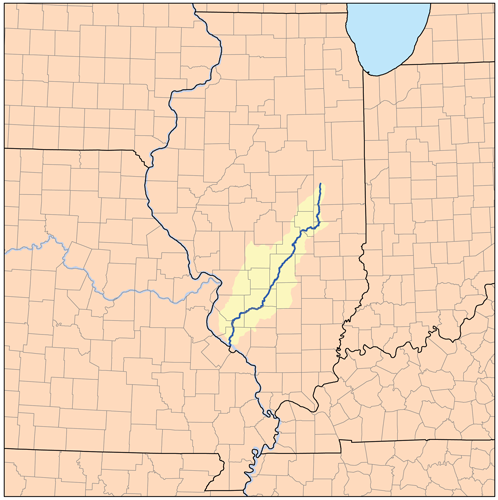
- Kaskaskia River watershed map

Location
- Country: United States

Physical characteristics
- Source
  - location: Interstate 74 in Champaign County, Illinois west of Champaign, Illinois
  - coordinates: 39°59′30″N 88°21′22″W
  - elevation: ~840 ft (260 m), (Yankee Ridge)
- Mouth
  - location: Mississippi River 10 mi (16 km) northwest of Chester
  - coordinates: 37°58′30″N 89°56′15″W
  - elevation: ~350 ft (110 m)
- Length: approximately 325 miles (523 km)
- Basin size: approximately 5,746 sq mi (14,880 km^{2})
- Discharge
  - average: 14,832 cu ft/s (420.0 m^{3}/s)

Basin features
- GNIS ID: 426395

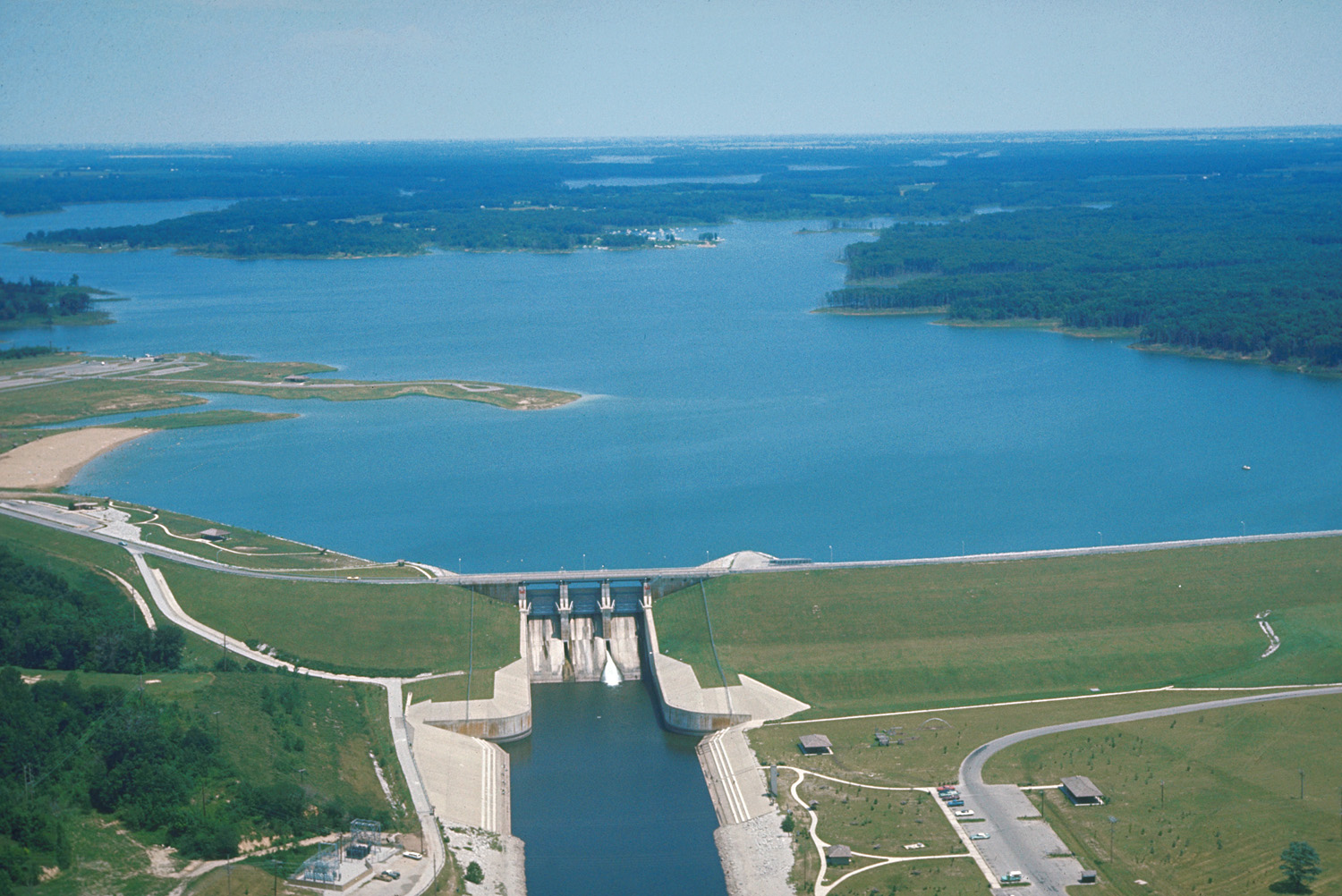
Shelbyville Lake and Dam on the Kaskaskia River at Shelbyville, Illinois

The Kaskaskia River is a tributary of the Mississippi River, approximately 325 miles (523 km) long, in central and southern Illinois in the United States. The second largest river system within Illinois, it drains a rural area of farms, as well as rolling hills along river bottoms of hardwood forests.

In the early 1700s, the French colonial town of Kaskaskia was founded near the mouth of the river. In 1819, Vandalia, some 80 miles up the river in the interior of the then new state of Illinois was chosen as its state capital, which it served as until 1839. Flooding in the late 19th century caused the Mississippi River to flow over and into the lowest reaches of the Kaskaskia taking the former lower Kaskaskia channel as its new course. Subsequently, the remaining lower reaches of the Kaskaskia have been canalized to allow barge traffic.

"Cascasquia" is an alternative spelling of "Kaskaskia" that is sometimes encountered. It was named after a clan of the Illiniwek encountered by the early French Jesuits and other settlers. "Okaw River" was an alternative name for the Kaskaskia that persists in place names along the river, including Okawville, and in a major tributary, the West Okaw River.

== Hydrography ==
The Kaskaskia rises in east central Illinois in several farm ditches along the west side of Champaign. The headwaters of the river is just north of Interstate 74, where it is marked with a sign. The river flows south across rural Champaign and Douglas counties, then southwest across southern Illinois, past Vandalia. It joins the Mississippi from the north approximately 10 miles (16 km) northwest of Chester and 40 miles (64 km) south-southeast of St. Louis, Missouri. The watershed of the river encompasses approximately 5,746 square miles (14,880 km^{2}), approximately 10.2% of the state of Illinois.

The Kaskaskia is impounded in Shelby County to form Lake Shelbyville. It is also impounded in Clinton County southwest of Vandalia to form Carlyle Lake.

For most of the 19th century, the river joined the Mississippi at Chester. Deforestation of river banks of the Mississippi and tributaries to fuel the hundreds of steamboats that plied the river had several significant environmental effects: destabilizing the banks, causing the Mississippi to become wider and more shallow, causing more severe flooding and leading to lateral channel changes in the American Bottoms area. In the aftermath of a major 1881 flood, the Mississippi changed its channel and moved east to flow along the lower 10 miles (16 km) of the channel of the Kaskaskia, shifting the confluence 10 miles north. As a result, a small portion of Illinois, including the former capital, Kaskaskia, was cut off from Illinois when the river moved to its east side. It is now located on the west side of the Mississippi. The community of Kaskaskia can now only be reached from the Missouri shore. The Kaskaskia River State Fish & Wildlife Area is located along the lower river in southern Illinois.

Fort Kaskaskia was located near the mouth of the river in Randolph County.

=== Tributaries ===
- Becks Creek
- Drum Hill Branch

== See also ==
- List of Illinois rivers
- "Kaskaskia River" a song, written by Sufjan Stevens on The Avalanche, which is composed of outtakes and other recordings from his concept album Illinois
