= Sullivan, Illinois =

- City
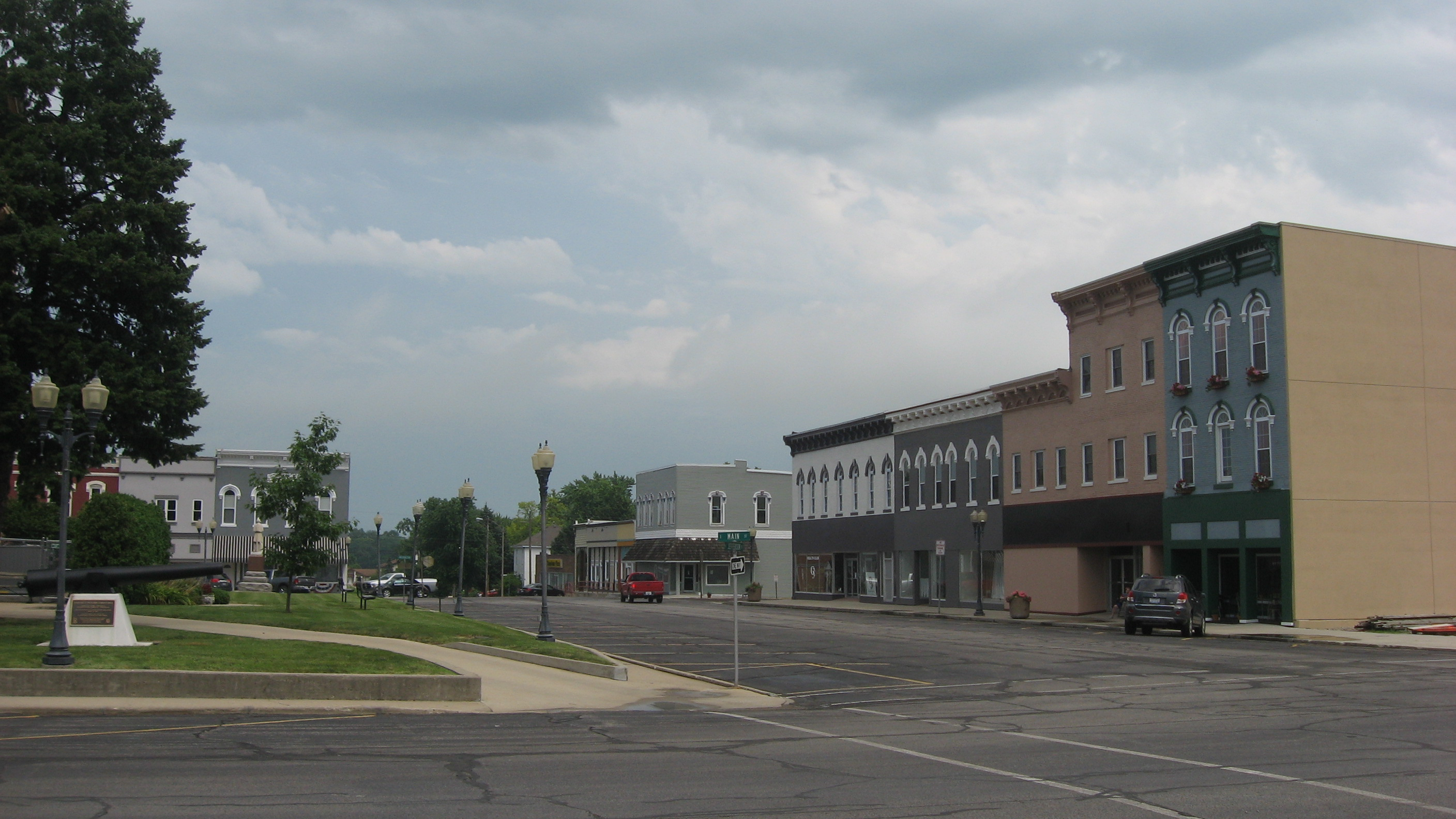
- South side of courthouse square in Sullivan
- Motto: "More Than Just a Small Town”
- Interactive map of Sullivan, Illinois
- Location within Illinois Location within the United States
- Coordinates: 39°36′01″N 88°37′12″W
- Country: United States
- State: Illinois
- County: Moultrie
- Township: Sullivan
- Founded: March 7, 1845
- Named after: Sullivan's Island, Charleston Harbor, South Carolina

Area
  - Total: 2.78 sq mi (7.19 km^{2})
  - Land: 2.77 sq mi (7.17 km^{2})
  - Water: 0.0077 sq mi (0.02 km^{2})
- Elevation: 676 ft (206 m)

Population (2020)
  - Total: 4,413
  - Density: 1,594.0/sq mi (615.44/km^{2})
- Time zone: UTC-6 (CST)
  - Summer (DST): UTC-5 (CDT)
- ZIP code: 61951
- Area code: 217
- FIPS code: 17-73495
- GNIS ID: 2395997
- Website: sullivanil.us

Sullivan is the largest city and the county seat of Moultrie County, Illinois, United States. The population was 4,413 at the time of the 2020 census. Sullivan is named after Sullivan's Island, South Carolina, where Fort Moultrie is located.

== History ==
Moultrie County Courthouse

Sullivan was founded in 1845 as Asa's Point. Two years after Sullivan was founded, the first official courthouse of the county was built. It was a simple two-story brick building with a hipped roof, and the county jail was housed in the basement. The village would come alive with gossip when court was in session. Abraham Lincoln passed through this first courthouse many times from 1849 to 1852, as he practiced law in the Moultrie County circuit court. The present courthouse (the county's third) contains a mural depicting this first courthouse.

In the opinion of early local leaders, Sullivan was not a logical site for a county seat. The village of Nelson (which no longer exists) had already been developed, and the prairie on which Sullivan would be built lacked proper drainage and was a breeding ground for malaria-carrying mosquitoes. In 1844, however, it was determined that centrally located Sullivan was to be the county seat.

The original village consisted of 40 acres (16 ha) (25 city blocks) bounded by Jackson Street on the north, Water Street on the south, Douglas (now Worth) Street on the east, and Hamilton Street on the west. Sullivan's first school was built in 1846, with the first church being built in 1848.

When Abraham Lincoln was campaigning for the state senate against Stephen A. Douglas, he gave a speech in Freeland Grove (now the Sullivan Civic Center parking lot). Freeland Grove was bounded by Wyman Park, Main Street, Strain Street, and Worth Street. A small monument facing Wyman Park near Main Street commemorates Lincoln's 1858 speech. During this campaign, a riot broke out on the town square between the supporters of Lincoln and the supporters of Douglas.

In 1864, a fire destroyed the first courthouse and a second, larger one was built that was in use until 1904, when it was demolished and the third, present-day courthouse was built. Along with the first courthouse building, hundreds of county records were lost.

Sullivan was home to the Titus Opera House, built in 1871, which was located on the north side of the town square. On the second and third floors of the building, the large auditorium, balcony, and box seats could accommodate up to 800 patrons. The opera house was among the finest in the area, and it hosted a concert given by the great Venezuelan pianist Teresa Carreño. The opera house was built by a businessman and Civil War veteran named Joseph Titus as both an attraction for high society and a "playground" for his young daughter, Winifred, who grew up to become a talented pianist and singer. She toured Europe during her career, even performing at the legendary Palais Garnier in Paris. In the early morning of February 20, 1910, the Titus Opera House caught fire and tragically burned to the ground. This marked the end of a live entertainment era in Sullivan until Guy S. Little Jr. founded The Little Theatre on the Square decades later.

Wyman Park, one of two parks on the north side of Sullivan, has an intriguing past. Albert Wyman, a man who immigrated to the United States from Germany, owned a shoe repair and sales shop on the west end of the town square. During the time Wyman was alive, Sullivan lacked a public park, so in his will he endowed much of his business profit to the city in order to purchase land for a park. While Wyman's will prohibited any kind of sales from occurring on the grounds of the new park, concession stands were built next to the baseball diamonds in the 1960s.

The Moultrie County Historical and Genealogical Society, formerly located in downtown Sullivan, now on the southern end of town on South Hamilton Street, houses a small museum of the county's past.

== Geography ==
Sullivan is located south of the center of Moultrie County. Illinois Routes 32 and 121 pass through the city center. IL 121 leads northwest 28 miles (45 km) to Decatur and southeast 17 miles (27 km) to Mattoon, while IL 32 leads north 9 miles (14 km) to Lovington and south 11 miles (18 km) to Windsor.

According to the U.S. Census Bureau, Sullivan has a total area of 2.78 square miles (7.2 km^{2}), of which 0.01 square miles (0.026 km^{2}), or 0.29%, are water. Asa Creek crosses the east side of the city, flowing south to the Kaskaskia River in Lake Shelbyville.

== Demographics ==
Historical population
Census	Pop.	Note	%±
1860	528		—
1870	742		40.5%
1880	1,305		75.9%
1890	1,468		12.5%
1900	2,399		63.4%
1910	2,621		9.3%
1920	2,532		−3.4%
1930	2,339		−7.6%
1940	3,101		32.6%
1950	3,470		11.9%
1960	3,946		13.7%
1970	4,112		4.2%
1980	4,526		10.1%
1990	4,354		−3.8%
2000	4,326		−0.6%
2010	4,440		2.6%
2020	4,413		−0.6%
U.S. Decennial Census

=== 2020 census ===
As of the 2020 census, Sullivan had a population of 4,413. The median age was 39.7 years. 22.7% of residents were under the age of 18 and 21.3% of residents were 65 years of age or older. For every 100 females there were 87.9 males, and for every 100 females age 18 and over there were 85.5 males age 18 and over.

100.0% of residents lived in urban areas, while 0.0% lived in rural areas.

There were 1,873 households in Sullivan, of which 27.3% had children under the age of 18 living in them. Of all households, 41.2% were married-couple households, 18.7% were households with a male householder and no spouse or partner present, and 32.8% were households with a female householder and no spouse or partner present. About 35.2% of all households were made up of individuals and 16.6% had someone living alone who was 65 years of age or older.

There were 2,042 housing units, of which 8.3% were vacant. The homeowner vacancy rate was 2.9% and the rental vacancy rate was 6.3%.

Racial composition as of the 2020 census
Race	Number	Percent
White	4,136	93.7%
Black or African American	51	1.2%
American Indian and Alaska Native	7	0.2%
Asian	23	0.5%
Native Hawaiian and Other Pacific Islander	0	0.0%
Some other race	30	0.7%
Two or more races	166	3.8%
Hispanic or Latino (of any race)	81	1.8%

=== 2000 census ===
As of the 2000 census, there were 4,326 people, 1,820 households, and 1,188 families residing in the city. The population density was 2,121.5 inhabitants per square mile (819.1/km^{2}). There were 1,945 housing units at an average density of 953.8 per square mile (368.3/km^{2}). The racial makeup of the city was 98.68% White, 0.30% African American, 0.12% Native American, 0.16% Asian, 0.09% from other races, and 0.65% from two or more races. Hispanic or Latino of any race were 0.39% of the population.

There were 1,820 households, out of which 28.3% had children under the age of 18 living with them, 51.8% were married couples living together, 10.4% had a female householder with no husband present, and 34.7% were non-families. 31.0% of all households were made up of individuals, and 16.5% had someone living alone who was 65 years of age or older. The average household size was 2.28 and the average family size was 2.84.

In the city the population was spread out, with 22.8% under the age of 18, 8.3% from 18 to 24, 25.9% from 25 to 44, 21.3% from 45 to 64, and 21.7% who were 65 years of age or older. The median age was 40 years. For every 100 females, there were 84.4 males. For every 100 females age 18 and over, there were 81.2 males.

The median income for a household in the city was $33,197, and the median income for a family was $41,894. Males had a median income of $31,754 versus $20,631 for females. The per capita income for the city was $17,693. About 5.4% of families and 8.8% of the population were below the poverty line, including 9.3% of those under age 18 and 8.9% of those age 65 or over.

== Economy ==
Sullivan is home to several companies. Agri-Fab, a manufacturer of lawn and garden attachments, and Hydro-Gear, a drivetrain manufacturer, have their corporate headquarters located in Sullivan along with factories. Sullivan is also home to Metro Communications and the First Community Bank of Moultrie County which first started in 1905 as a national bank under the name of First National Bank of Sullivan.

== Education ==
Sullivan is home to Sullivan Community Unit School District 300 which includes Sullivan High School, where the sports teams have the name "Redskins."

The official school song is Northwestern University's "Go Northwestern," and the fight song is entitled "Hail Red and Black." The school fight song has lyrics written by a Sullivan High School alumnus, but the music was composed by Dr. Paul Van Buskirk Yoder, a notable composer, arranger, and band director of the twentieth century.

== Points of interest ==
=== The Little Theatre on the Square ===
The Little Theatre on the Square in Sullivan is a non-profit; it received $20,000 from President Barack Obama's 2009 economic stimulus package. In 2013, it received $23,200 from the Illinois Arts Council for general operating expenses.

=== Abraham Lincoln Memorial ===
When Abraham Lincoln was campaigning for senate against Stephen A. Douglas, he gave a speech on September 20, 1858, in Freeland's Grove (now Wyman Park), and today there is a monument commemorating his speech at the approximate location.

=== Huntsburger Hood Ornament Collection ===
A sample of the 700+ vintage hood ornaments of Lynn Huntsburger's collection, located in the board room of the Elizabeth Titus Memorial Library.

=== Ward Museum ===
The Ward Museum at Mason Point, a nursing home just east of Sullivan, displays a collection of items collected from around the world by the Ward family, including one of the largest collections of seashells in the nation. The Wards' collection went on display in 1948, and the collection has remained intact since then. It was featured on an episode of the TV show Illinois Adventure. The museum was established by Abraham Lincoln "Link" Ward, a farmer, livestock dealer, and auctioneer, as well as his wife, Cora Anne (Hinterly) Ward. In addition to seashells, the museum contains over 1,000 pieces of antique glassware, including 400 antique goblets. Frontier life items include wooden wheel clocks, circa 1830, copper-toed shoes, spinning wheels, and broadaxes. The museum was established in 1948; Cora Ward died in 1967, and the executor of her estate burned the catalog compilation, so the origin of the over 5,000 items donated by the couple, who travelled widely, is unknown.

=== Nixon rally and buffalo burger ===
During the 1960 presidential election, then-Vice President Richard Nixon held a campaign rally in Sullivan. He discarded a half-eaten buffalo burger that was the product of the slaughter of buffalo owned by the City of Sullivan and housed at their street maintenance facility. The discarded burger was retrieved by Sullivan resident Steve Jenne, who preserved it. Jenne exhibited the burger on The Tonight Show Starring Johnny Carson in 1988 and was a guest on I've Got a Secret in 2006.

== Notable people ==
- Albert J. Beveridge, historian and U.S. senator
- Steve Buxton, NFL football player
- Gregory Cochran, physicist, anthropologist, and writer
- William Granville Cochran, Illinois state judge and legislator
- John R. Eden, attorney and congressman
- Tiny Hill, bandleader
- R. Eden Martin, lawyer
- Samuel W. Moulton, attorney and congressman
- Gary Noffke, artist
- Harold Pogue, football player
- Art Schwind, Major League Baseball player, 1912
- William Irving Shuman, businessman and politician
- Douglas Wilson, interior designer on Trading Spaces; former owner of Doug Wilson's Jibby's
