= Illinois Route 32 =

State highway in Illinois, United States

Illinois Route 32
- IL 32 highlighted in red

Route information
- Maintained by IDOT
- Length: 69.32 mi (111.56 km)
- Existed: November 5, 1918–present

Major junctions
- South end: US 40 / IL 33 in Effingham
- I-57 / I-70 in Effingham; US 36 in LaPlace
- North end: IL 48 / CR 18 in Cisco

Location
- Country: United States
- State: Illinois
- Counties: Effingham, Shelby, Moultrie, Piatt, Macon

Highway system
- Illinois State Highway System; Interstate; US; State; Tollways; Scenic
← IL 31	→ IL 33

Illinois Route 32 (IL 32) is a north–south highway with its southern terminus at U.S. Route 40 and Illinois Route 33 in Effingham and its northern terminus at Illinois Route 48 at Cisco, a few hundred feet south of Interstate 72. Illinois 32 is 69.32 miles (111.56 km) long.

== Route description ==
Illinois 32 overlaps Illinois 33 from Shumway to Effingham, where Illinois 32 terminates and Illinois 33 continues east through Effingham to the Vincennes, Indiana area. Traveling north, Illinois 32 services Windsor, Sullivan, Lovington, and Cerro Gordo before reaching Cisco.

== History ==
SBI Route 32 was established in 1918 from the Decatur area (actually Cerro Gordo) to Windsor. In 1937 it was extended to Effingham, and in January 1998, it was extended north to Illinois 48.

== Major intersections ==
County	Location	mi	km	Destinations	Notes
Effingham	Effingham	0.0	0.0	US 40 / IL 33 east (Fayette Avenue) to I-57 / I-70	Southern terminus; south end of IL 33 overlap
Effingham	Effingham	1.1	1.8	I-57 / I-70 – Mt. Vernon, East St. Louis, Champaign, Terre Haute	I-57 exit 160
Effingham		4.8	7.7	IL 33 west	North end of IL 33 overlap
Shelby	Windsor	21.4	34.4	IL 16 west	South end of IL 16 overlap
Shelby	Windsor	23.9	38.5	IL 16 east (Kentucky Avenue)	North end of IL 16 overlap
Moultrie	Sullivan	35.5	57.1	IL 121 south (Jackson Street)	South end of IL 121 overlap
Moultrie	Sullivan	36.9	59.4	IL 121 north	North end of IL 121 overlap
Moultrie	Lovington	44.3	71.3	IL 133 east	Western terminus of IL 133
Moultrie–Piatt county line	LaPlace	52.7	84.8	US 36	
Piatt	Cerro Gordo	56.9	91.6	IL 105 west	South end of IL 105 overlap
Piatt	Cerro Gordo	59.7	96.1	IL 105 east	North end of IL 105 overlap
Piatt–Macon county line	Cisco	69.32	111.56	IL 48	Northern terminus
Piatt–Macon county line	Cisco	69.32	111.56	CR 18 west (School Road)	Continuation beyond IL 48
1.000 mi = 1.609 km; 1.000 km = 0.621 mi: Concurrency terminus
