= Illinois Route 105 =

State highway in Macon and Piatt Counties, Illinois, US

Illinois Route 105

Route information
- Maintained by IDOT
- Length: 37.58 mi (60.48 km)
- Existed: 1945–present

Major junctions
- West end: IL 48 in Decatur
- US 36 / IL 121 in Decatur
- East end: I-72 in Monticello

Location
- Country: United States
- State: Illinois
- Counties: Macon, Piatt

Highway system
- Illinois State Highway System; Interstate; US; State; Tollways; Scenic
| ← IL 104 | → IL 106 |

Illinois Route 105 (IL-105) is a highway in the U.S. state of Illinois. It is an east–west highway that runs from Illinois Route 48 in Decatur to Interstate 72 near Monticello. Illinois 105 is 37.58 miles (60.48 km) long.

== Route description ==
The state highway serves a corn-and-soybean-growing region in Macon County and Piatt County. Roads such as IL-105 carry corn and soybeans to the refineries of Decatur for the manufacture of commodities such as soybean oil and corn syrup.

Rural towns along Illinois Route 105 include Bement and Cerro Gordo. The highway also runs past the Bryant Cottage State Historic Site.

== History ==
SBI Route 105 was what Illinois Route 104 is now from Meredosia to Quincy from 1924 thru 1937. In 1945, the number was reused on former Illinois Route 47 north of Decatur. This is the current routing for Illinois 105.

== Major Intersections ==
| County | Location | mi | km | Destinations | Notes |
|---|---|---|---|---|---|
| Macon | Decatur | 0.0 | 0.0 | IL 48 – Taylorville | |
| Macon | Decatur | 1.0 | 1.6 | US 51 Bus. south – Pana | West end of US 51 Business concurrency |
| Macon | Decatur | 1.3 | 2.1 | US 51 Bus. north – Bloomington | East end of US 51 Business concurrency |
| Macon | Decatur | 3.9 | 6.3 | US 36 / IL 121 south – Tuscola, Mattoon, Springfield | West end of IL 121 concurrency |
| Macon | Decatur | 4.0 | 6.4 | IL 121 north – Lincoln | East end of IL 121 concurrency |
| Piatt | Cerro Gordo | 14.7 | 23.7 | IL 32 south – Lovington | West end of IL 32 concurrency |
| Piatt | Cerro Gordo | 17.6 | 28.3 | IL 32 north – Cisco | East end of IL 32 concurrency |
| Piatt | Monticello | 37.58 | 60.48 | I-72 – Champaign, Decatur | Exit 166 (Interstate 72) |
1.000 mi = 1.609 km; 1.000 km = 0.621 mi: Concurrency terminus
