= Shady Rest =

Park on the Sangamon River in Illinois, U.S.

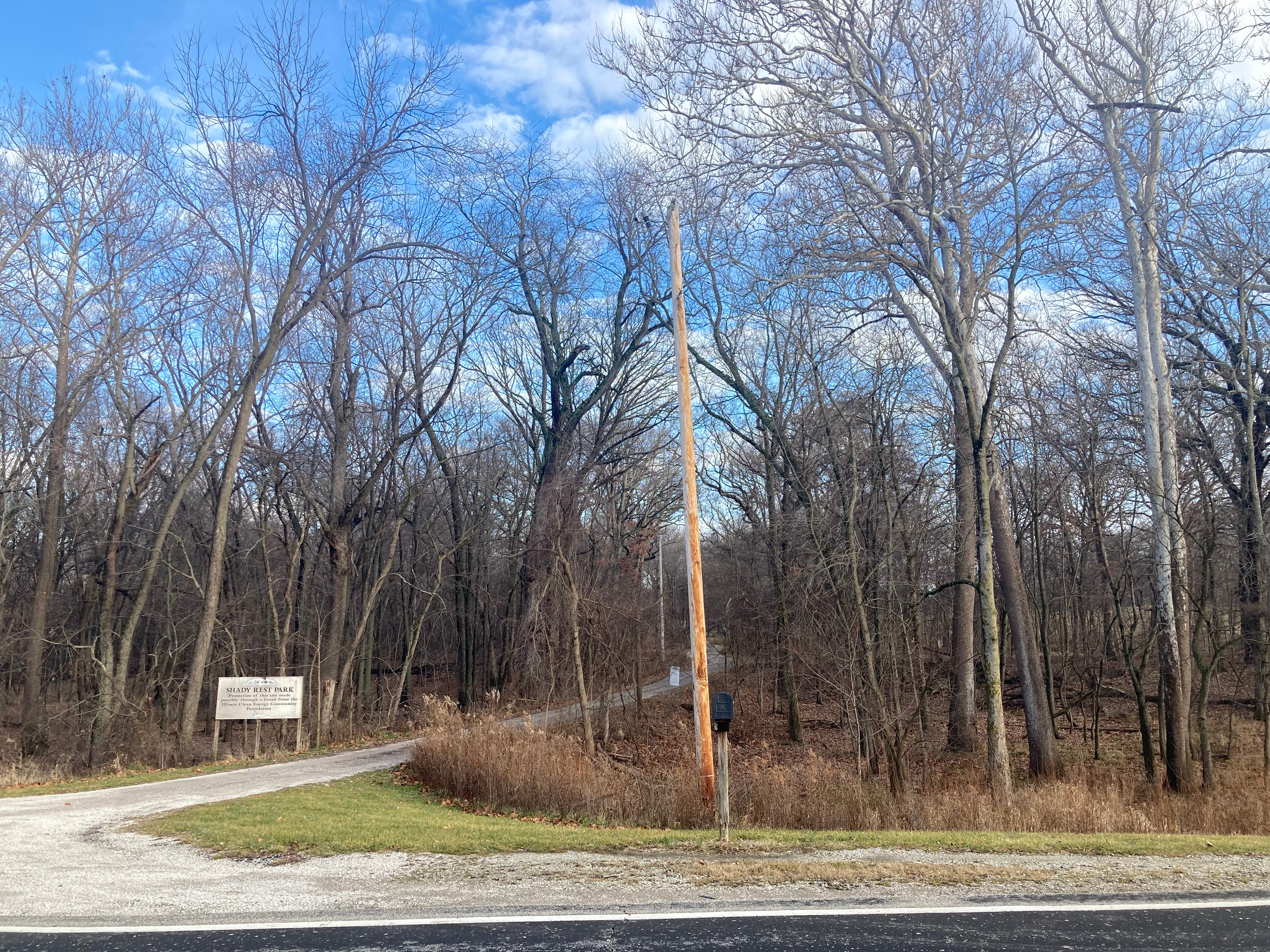
- Interactive map of Shady Rest
- Location: Piatt County, Illinois
- Nearest city: Monticello
- Coordinates: 40°5′37″N 88°31′53″W

Shady Rest Land and Water Reserve is a 28-acre (110,000 m^{2}) natural area which protects a roughly 0.25-mile (0.40 km) segment of the Sangamon River west of White Heath, Illinois. The landscape includes a river, moraine, a forest with under-story herbs and wildlife, a rail-trail that moves through the site, and cultural history spots. The park is part lowland forest and part upland forest, which reduce runoff and sediment entering the river.

== History ==
Shady Rest was originally owned and operated by the Price family. In 1985, Mrs. Price, who was the sole owner after her husband David died, wanted to ensure that the site would be retained as a natural resource and retreat along with the related Heartland Pathways rail bed that runs through the site. Mrs. Price contributed significantly to the purchase of the rail bed.

In 1995, after Mrs. Price's death, the formal purchase of Shady Rest was arranged for preservation purposes and to allow the site to return to nature and dedicate it as a natural area. A non-profit organization, the Sangamon Valley Conservancy (SVC), was funded for that purpose by a number of contributors. Additionally, in 2006, a park was established by the Piatt County Forest Preserve District with the use of a grant from the Illinois Clean Energy Community Foundation to create a new place to fish, canoe, and hike.

== Natural history ==
The recreational nature of the woods remains identifiable by the presence of big and small but no in-between trees. This indicates that the site was at one point cleared of small trees and brush to create a park-like setting. As the site returned to nature the under-story plants have burgeoned, and they make a beautiful display in spring. A number of under-story herbs continue throughout the summer and fall. Settlers sought to suppress fires, so there is an excess of maples that in nature would have been culled by fire (to which maples are susceptible).

Two recreation era houses remain on an upland ridge that is part of the Cerro Gordo moraine. One house is occupied, the other is a Price family retreat, and serves as an example of the inexpensive and vernacular cabin-like buildings of the period. The Cerro Gordo Moraine, which runs through Shady Rest, was the southern border of a lake that covered the lowlands extending north to Centreville. Eventually the lake broke through at Shady Rest. This breakthrough formed the Sangamon River, which runs through the site.

== Rail trail ==
An abandoned Illinois Central rail-bed trail, owned by Heartland Pathways, runs through the site with a bridge and trestle over the Sangamon River that is an attraction. Shady Rest provides a convenient rest stop on the HP hiking and biking trail. The rail-bed introduces an element of railroad history. Steam trains took on water from the river at this location.

The Monticello Railway Museum (MRRM) abuts the Heartland Pathways trail at White Heath, just a mile away. It is possible that the museum could extend to Shady Rest, giving museum visitors the opportunity to visit a bottomland forest and historic recreational site. Some historic railroad interests would like to extend the MRRM's tracks to Lodge to join a Norfolk Southern mainline to complete a 23-mile (37 km) tourist circuit south to Monticello and back to the Railway Museum.

== Activities ==
In its heyday, Shady Rest sported a number of small cabins, a club house, three residences and the space for tenting and recreational activities. In recent years Shady Rest has been used as a retreat. The cabins have been torn down and the forest has grown back.

The flood plains to the north that are spring-wet and are summer-dry could be used as dry-season trails. When the river is high there is the potential for canoeing on the Sangamon River from Mahomet to Decatur. The site is ideal site for artists and people wanting to enjoy the aesthetics of an outdoor setting.

== In the community ==
Shady Rest is currently being transferred by the Sangamon Valley Conservancy to the Piatt County Forest Preserve, with the aid of a Clean Energy Community Foundation Grant. The grant will pay the Forest Preserve to reimburse SVC for the loans that HP and SVC solicited in order for SVC to buy the site. The Piatt County Forest Preserve will then become the owners in perpetuity and caretakers of the site. The grant will pay approximately $4,000 per acre to release the people who have made tangible loans to SVC for the preservation. The grant does not cover preservation costs incurred by Heartland Pathways or others in the twenty years prior to the SVC purchase.

The transfer of Shady Rest to the Forest Preserve allows a tax base for the natural and cultural restoration, maintenance and interpretation of the park.
