= Illinois Route 48 =

State highway in Illinois, United States

Illinois Route 48
- IL 48 highlighted in red

Route information
- Maintained by IDOT
- Length: 85.38 mi (137.41 km)
- Existed: 1924–present

Major junctions
- South end: I-55 / IL 127 in Raymond
- US 51 in Decatur; US 36 in Decatur; I-72 in Decatur; I-72 in Cisco
- North end: IL 54 in DeWitt

Location
- Country: United States
- State: Illinois
- Counties: Montgomery, Christian, Macon, Piatt, DeWitt

Highway system
- Illinois State Highway System; Interstate; US; State; Tollways; Scenic
← IL 47	→ IL 49

Illinois Route 48 (IL 48) is an 85.38-mile (137.41 km) north–south state highway with its southern terminus at Interstate 55 (I-55) and IL 127 in Raymond and its northern terminus at IL 54 east of Clinton.

== Route description ==
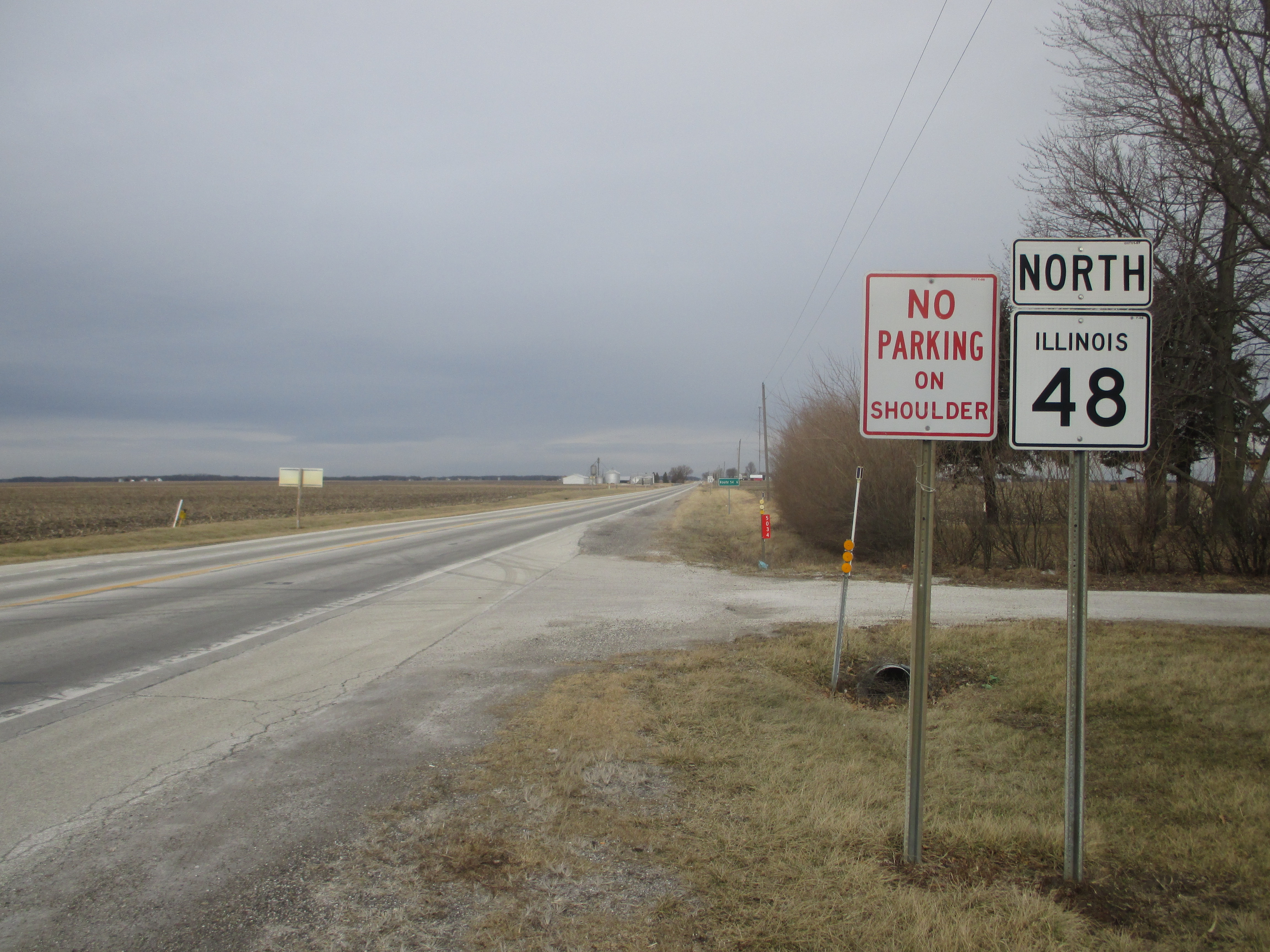
Northbound IL 48 past IL 10 near Weldon

IL 48 travels southwest to northeast from I-55 to IL 54 east of Clinton. It is an undivided surface street for its entire length. It also serves the cities of Raymond, Taylorville, and Decatur.

IL 48 and IL 127 travel east starting at an interchange with I-55. In Raymond, IL 127 turns south, while IL 48 travels northeast. IL 48 serves Harvel, Morrisonville, Palmer, and Clarksdale. IL 48 then bypasses Hewittsville and downtown Taylorville and intersects with IL 29. Continuing toward Decatur, IL 48 serves Willeys, Stonington, Blue Mound, and Boody. The route has an interchange with US 51 before entering through the city limit of Decatur.

Near downtown Decatur, IL 48 intersects with IL 105 before crossing over the Sangamon River. At the Millikin University, IL 48 indirectly meets US 36. IL 48 then turns east along IL 121. IL 48 turns northeast at a continuous-flow intersection. From there until Cisco, IL 48 parallels I-72. Between two interchanges with I-72 at Decatur and Cisco, the route serves Oreana and Argenta. After Cisco, the route curves north for the remainder of the route, serving Weldon and IL 10. IL 48 eventually ends at IL 54 in Fullerton.

== History ==
SBI Route 48 traveled from Onarga to Raymond via the current IL 48 and IL 54. The route appeared in 1929 with the construction of a diagonal roadway. Construction of a new road concluded by 1935. The portion from Fullerton to Onarga became part of an extension of US 54 in 1942. In 1972, IL 54 was assigned from Springfield to Onarga after US 54 was reverted to its pre-1942 terminus at US 36 (now IL 107) west of Pittsfield.

== Major intersections ==
County	Location	mi	km	Destinations	Notes
Montgomery				N 22nd Avenue to Historic US 66	Continuation beyond IL 48 to Historic US 66
Montgomery		0.0	0.0	I-55 – Springfield, East St. Louis IL 127 begins	Southern terminus; south end of IL 127 concurrency; I-55 exit 63
Montgomery	Raymond	3.5	5.6	IL 127 south – Hillsboro	North end of IL 127 concurrency
Christian	Taylorville	26.7	43.0	IL 29 – Taylorville, Pana	
Macon		49.0	78.9	US 51 – Springfield, Bloomington, Pana	Interchange
Macon	Decatur	51.4	82.7	IL 105 east – Monticello	Western terminus of IL 105
Macon	Decatur	53.0	85.3	US 36	
Macon	Decatur	55.1	88.7	IL 121 north – Lincoln	South end of IL 121 concurrency
Macon	Decatur	57.7	92.9	IL 121 south – Mattoon	North end of IL 121 concurrency
Macon		60.5	97.4	I-72 – Springfield, Champaign	I-72 exit 144
Macon–Piatt county line		71.6	115.2	IL 32 south – Cisco	Northern terminus of IL 32
Macon–Piatt county line		72.0	115.9	I-72 – Decatur, Champaign	I-72 exit 156
De Witt	Weldon	79.7	128.3	IL 10 – Clinton, Champaign	
De Witt		85.38	137.41	IL 54 – Clinton, Farmer City	Northern terminus
1.000 mi = 1.609 km; 1.000 km = 0.621 mi: Concurrency terminus

== See also ==
- List of state routes in Illinois
