= Illinois Route 121 =

State highway in central Illinois, US

Illinois Route 121
- IL 121 highlighted in red

Route information
- Maintained by IDOT
- Length: 109.48 mi (176.19 km)
- Existed: 1924–present

Major junctions
- South end: IL 130 in Greenup
- US 45 in Trilla; I-57 in Mattoon; US 45 in Mattoon; US 36 / IL 105 in Decatur; I-72 / US 51 in Decatur; I-55 BL in Lincoln
- North end: I-55 in Lincoln

Location
- Country: United States
- State: Illinois
- Counties: Cumberland, Coles, Moultrie, Macon, Logan

Highway system
- Illinois State Highway System; Interstate; US; State; Tollways; Scenic
← IL 120	→ IL 122

Illinois Route 121 (IL 121) is a 109.48-mile-long (176.19 km) major state highway in the central part of the U.S. state of Illinois. Although it travels from northwest to southeast, it is marked as a north–south highway. It travels from IL 130 in Greenup (very near U.S. Route 40) to Interstate 55 (I-55) in Lincoln at the interchange of I-55 and IL 10.

== Route description ==
IL 121 travels north from Greenup near I-70. While traveling northwest, IL 121 travels through Toledo and has an interchange with I-57 in Mattoon.

From there, it travels northwest into the city limits of Decatur but largely goes around downtown using 22nd Street and Pershing Road. On the northwest side of Decatur, IL 121 intersects with the concurrent I-72 and US 51.

IL 121 continues further northwest into Lincoln, where it has a concurrency with IL 10 through Lincoln as Keokuk Street and Woodlawn Road before terminating at I-55 just south of I-155. IL 10 continues west on the same road.

== History ==
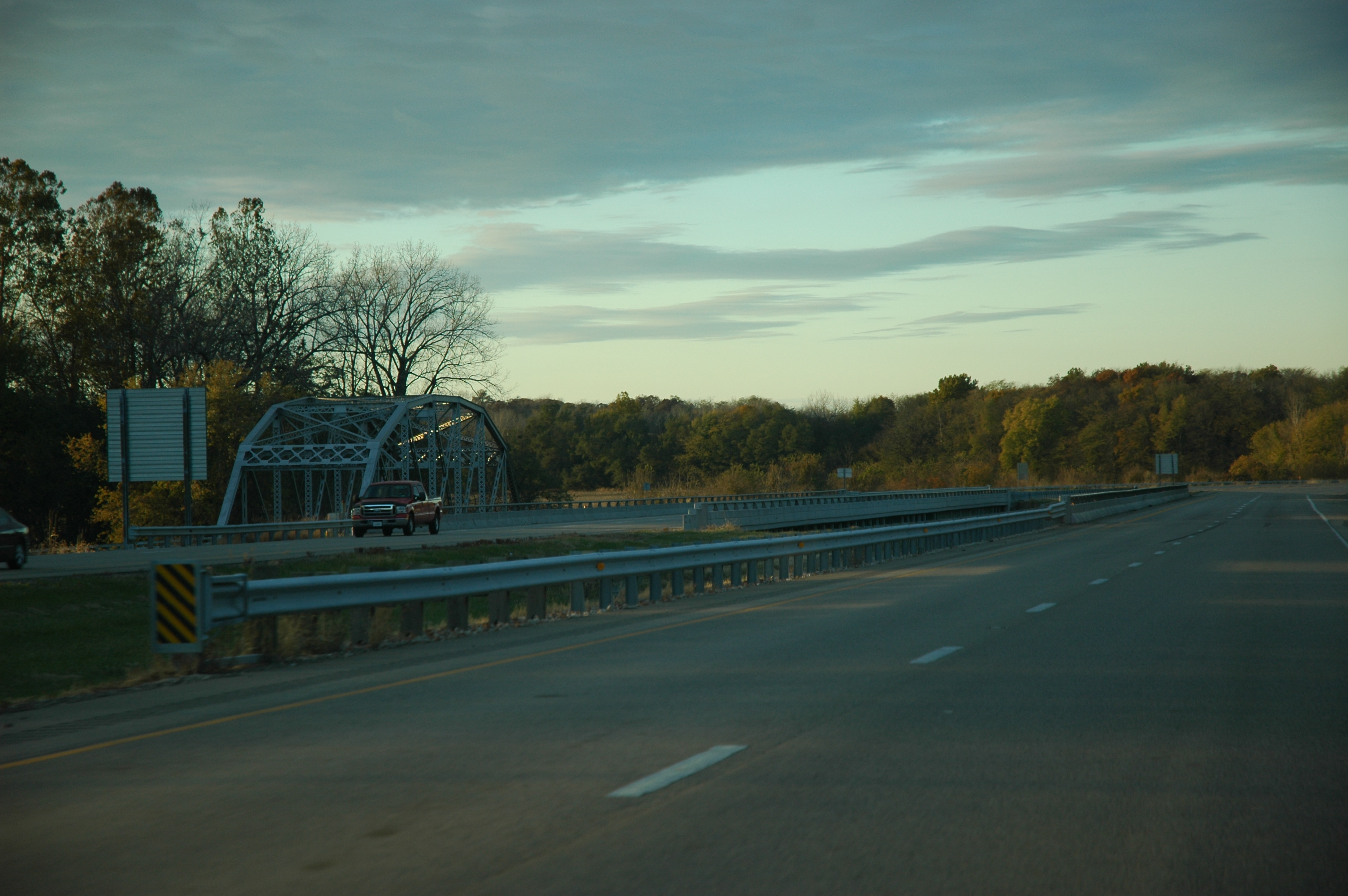
Truss bridge at former IL 121, west of I-155

State Bond Issue (SBI) Route 121 formerly traveled from Peoria to the Indiana state line east of Chrisman. When US 36 was established in the late 1920s, IL 121 was dropped east of Decatur. In March 1937, IL 121 replaced then IL 131 and IL 132 south of Decatur to Greenup.

In 1993, I-155 north of Lincoln was completed. IL 121 was then dropped from this stretch of freeway.

IL 121 had a business route through Decatur until about 1980 along Main Street and Water Street. This was replaced by US 51 Business.

== Major intersections ==
County	Location	mi	km	Destinations	Notes
Cumberland	Greenup	0.0	0.0	IL 130	
Cumberland		19.0	30.6	US 45 south	South end of US 45 concurrency
Coles	Mattoon	23.6	38.0	I-57 – Effingham, Champaign	I-57 exit 184
Coles	Mattoon	27.4	44.1	IL 16 east – Charleston	South end of IL 16 concurrency
Coles	Mattoon	27.4	44.1	IL 16 west – Shelbyville	North end of IL 16 concurrency
Coles	Mattoon	28.0	45.1	US 45 north – Arcola	North end of US 45 concurrency
Moultrie	Sullivan	44.4	71.5	IL 32 south – Effingham	South end of IL 32 concurrency
Moultrie		45.8	73.7	IL 32 north – Lovington	North end of IL 32 concurrency
Moultrie	Dalton City	58.8	94.6	IL 128 south – Shelbyville	
Macon	Decatur	67.3	108.3	US 36 east – Tuscola	South end of US 36 concurrency
Macon	Decatur	70.4	113.3	US 36 west / IL 105 west – Springfield	North end of US 36 concurrency; south end of IL 105 concurrency
Macon	Decatur	70.6	113.6	IL 105 east – Monticello	North end of IL 105 concurrency
Macon	Decatur	72.7	117.0	IL 48 north – Argenta	South end of IL 48 concurrency
Macon	Decatur	74.3	119.6	US 51 Bus. north (Water Street) – Bloomington, Clinton	One-way pair
Macon	Decatur	74.4	119.7	US 51 Bus. south (Main Street) – Macon, Pana	One-way pair
Macon	Decatur	75.3	121.2	IL 48 south – Taylorville	North end of IL 48 concurrency
Macon	Decatur	77.5	124.7	I-72 / US 51 – Springfield, Pana, Champaign, Bloomington	I-72 exit 138
Logan	Mt. Pulaski	94.3	151.8	To IL 54 – Clinton, Springfield	
Logan	Lincoln	105.5	169.8	IL 10 east – Clinton	South end of IL 10 concurrency
Logan	Lincoln	105.9	170.4	I-55 BL north (Kickapoo Street) / Historic US 66 east	1930-1940 Historic US 66
Logan	Lincoln	106.1	170.8	I-55 BL south (Logan Street) / Historic US 66 west	1930-1940 Historic US 66
Logan	Lincoln	107.6	173.2	Historic US 66 (Lincoln Parkway)	
Logan	Lincoln	109.48	176.19	I-55 to I-155 north – Bloomington, Springfield, Peoria IL 10 west – Mason City	Northern terminus; north end of IL 10 concurrency; I-55 exit 126
1.000 mi = 1.609 km; 1.000 km = 0.621 mi: Concurrency terminus
