= Ownby =

Ownby is a surname. Notable people with the surname include:

- Brian Ownby (b. 1990), American soccer player
- Dan Ownby (b. 1968), American Scout volunteer
- James P. Ownby (1845–1906), American politician and farmer
- Ben Ownby (b. 1993 or 1994)

== See also ==
- Ownby Stadium
- John Ownby Cabin
