= Illinois Route 16 =

State highway in central Illinois, US

Illinois Route 16
- IL 16 highlighted in red

Route information
- Maintained by IDOT
- Length: 174.66 mi (281.09 km)
- Existed: November 5, 1918–present

Major junctions
- West end: IL 100 in Hardin
- US 67 in Jerseyville; I-55 in Litchfield; US 51 in Pana; US 45 / IL 121 in Mattoon; I-57 in Mattoon
- East end: US 150 / IL 1 / IL 133 in Paris

Location
- Country: United States
- State: Illinois
- Counties: Calhoun, Greene, Jersey, Macoupin, Montgomery, Christian, Shelby, Moultrie, Coles, Edgar

Highway system
- Illinois State Highway System; Interstate; US; State; Tollways; Scenic
← IL 15	→ IL 17

Illinois Route 16 (IL 16) is an east–west highway in central Illinois. Its western terminus is at the Joe Page Bridge over the Illinois River in Hardin, while its eastern terminus is at Paris at Illinois Route 1 and U.S. Route 150, with Illinois Route 133. This is a distance of 174.66 miles (281.09 km).

== Route description ==
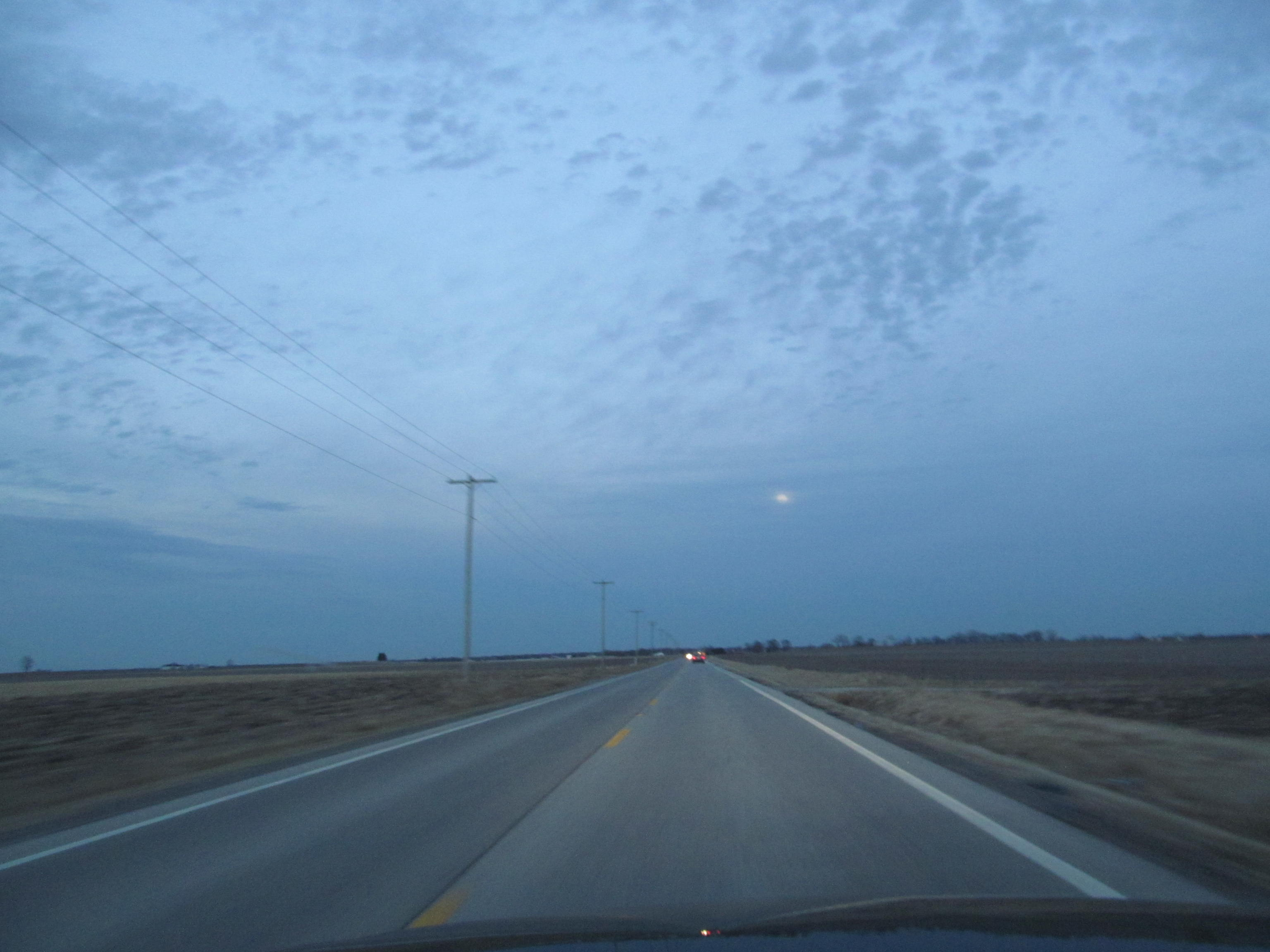
Illinois Route 16, March 2014

Illinois 16 is a major east–west state highway in Central Illinois. It runs east from Hardin to Hillsboro, and then turns northeast to Pana. Illinois 16 then continues east to Shelbyville and then to Paris. It overlaps Illinois 133 shortly before entering Paris.

In Paris, Illinois 16 and Illinois 133 terminate at the intersection of Jasper and Main/Central Streets. Illinois 16/133 run west from this intersection, while U.S. 150 runs north and east. Illinois 1 runs north and south.

== History ==
SBI Route 16 was established in 1918, running originally from Litchfield east to Paris. In 1962, a new 4-lane highway was built from Mattoon to Charleston; this became Illinois 16, while the old alignment became Illinois Route 316, which was dropped sometime in the 1970s.

== Major intersections ==
County	Location	mi	km	Destinations	Notes
Calhoun	Hardin	0.0	0.0	IL 100 north / Great River Road north	West end of IL 100/GRR overlap
Illinois River		0.1	0.16	Hardin Bridge	
Jersey		5.8	9.3	IL 100 south / Great River Road south	East end of IL 100/GRR overlap
Jersey	Jerseyville	18.8	30.3	US 67 (State Street)	
Macoupin		28.8	46.3	IL 111 / IL 267	
Macoupin	Royal Lakes	39.0	62.8	IL 159 south	
Macoupin	Gillespie	47.0	75.6	IL 4 south	West end of IL 4 overlap
Macoupin	Gillespie	47.5	76.4	IL 4 north (Springfield Road)	East end of IL 4 overlap
Montgomery	Litchfield	55.5	89.3	I-55 – Springfield, East St. Louis	I-55 exit 52
Montgomery	Litchfield	56.2	90.4	Historic US 66 (Columbian Boulevard)	
Montgomery		63.7	102.5	IL 127 north	West end of IL 127 overlap
Montgomery	Hillsboro	66.2	106.5	IL 127 south (Main Street)	East end of IL 127 overlap
Christian	Pana	95.2	153.2	US 51 south (Poplar Street)	West end of US 51 overlap
Christian	Pana	95.8	154.2	IL 29 north (Hickory Street)	
Christian		97.3	156.6	US 51 north	East end of US 51 overlap
Shelby		108	174	IL 128 south	West end of IL 128 overlap
Shelby	Shelbyville	111	179	IL 128 north (Cedar Street)	East end of IL 128 overlap
Shelby		121	195	IL 32 south	West end of IL 32 overlap
Shelby	Windsor	123	198	IL 32 north (Hickory Street)	East end of IL 32 overlap
Moultrie	No major junctions				
Coles	Mattoon	136	219	US 45 north / IL 121 north (19th Street)	West end of US 45/IL 121 overlap
Coles	Mattoon	136	219	US 45 south / IL 121 south (Lake Land Boulevard)	East end of US 45/IL 121 overlap
Coles	Mattoon	139	224	I-57 – Champaign, Effingham	I-57 exit 190
Coles	Charleston	147	237	IL 130	
Coles		158	254	IL 49 south	West end of IL 49 overlap
Edgar	Kansas	160	260	IL 49 north (Front Street)	East end of IL 49 overlap
Edgar	Paris	174	280	IL 133 west	West end of IL 133 overlap
Edgar	Paris	174.66	281.09	US 150 west / IL 1 (Central Avenue, Main Street) – Marshall, Danville IL 133 ends	One way streets; eastern termini of IL 16/133
Edgar	Paris	174.66	281.09	US 150 east – Terre Haute	Continuation beyond IL 1
1.000 mi = 1.609 km; 1.000 km = 0.621 mi: Concurrency terminus

== See also ==
- List of state routes in Illinois
