= White Heath, Illinois =

Census-designated place in Platt County, Illinois, United States

White Heath
- Census-designated place
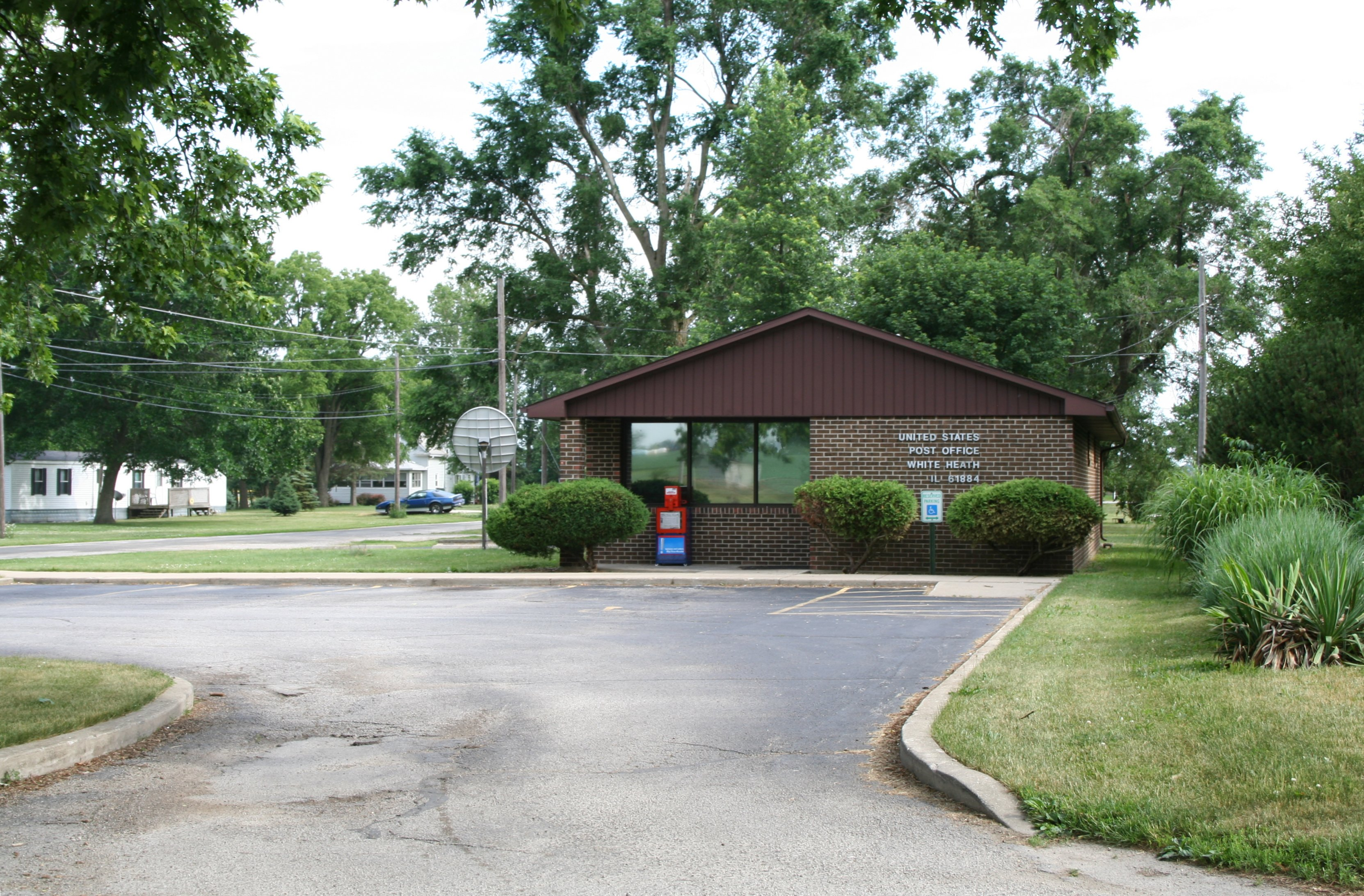
- White Heath Post Office, 2007

- Location of White Heath within Illinois
- Coordinates: 40°05′13″N 88°30′42″W
- Country: United States
- State: Illinois
- County: Piatt
- Township: Sangamon

Area
  - Total: 0.347 sq mi (0.90 km^{2})
  - Land: 0.347 sq mi (0.90 km^{2})
  - Water: 0 sq mi (0 km^{2})
- Elevation: 702 ft (214 m)

Population (2010)
  - Total: 290
  - Density: 840/sq mi (320/km^{2})
- Time zone: UTC-6 (CST)
  - Summer (DST): UTC-5 (CDT)
- ZIP code: 61884
- Area code: 217
- GNIS ID: 2628564

White Heath is a census-designated place in Piatt County, Illinois, United States. As of the 2020 census, its population was 251.

== History ==
A plaque in the community center states that the area was settled by a Mr. White and a Mr. Heath. Noble Porter Heath (1830-1893), moved his farm to the area in 1871 from Sagamon Township. Frank White, who had purchased land in Sagamon Township in 1861, sold 160 acres of what would be White Heath to James Deland for $6040 in 1872. Heath served as a witness to the sale.

Located about 15 miles west of Champaign, IL, Deland platted the town at the junction point of two pioneer railroads that were constructing through the area - the Monticello Railroad (Champaign-Monticello-Decatur) and the Havana, Mason City, Lincoln & Eastern Railroad through the named towns. Mr. Deland was an incorporator of the H, MC, L & E and owned property at the junction point. Being a railroad junction, it was expected White Heath could develop into a major town, but when this failed to materialize, Mr. Deland sold his land interests in the town. The two pioneer railroads were later consolidated and the lines eventually became part of the Illinois Central.

The first church in White Heath was the Camp Creek Methodist Church. It had been founded in 1854 and was located about a mile south White Heath, but in 1897 the church was moved to the town.

The Monticello Railway Museum purchased 7 miles of the former Illinois Central Decatur and Havana District branch lines between Monticello and White Heath on July 29, 1987. White Heath is located at the northern end of the Museum's purchase. The trackage arrangement in White Heath forms a complete "wye" which can be used to turn trains. The depot, built in 1942 to replace an earlier structure, is still standing although it is owned by a local resident and not the Museum. It is unused at present. The Decatur District (MRyM's "Central District") has been refurbished for operation at 10 mph to White Heath and is occasionally used for the Museum's "Railroad Days" event on the third weekend of September every year. At the present time, privately owned freight cars are stored on the north 2 miles of the Museum's trackage into White Heath as a fundraiser. When the track is completely refurbished, Museum trains may enter White Heath and use the Wye.

There is one school, White Heath Elementary School. Their mascot (when a junior high school and had sports) was a Warrior. The school is now part of Monticello Community District School #25.

== Geography ==
White Heath is located in Sangamon Township.

== Notable person ==
The zoologist Richard D. Alexander was born in White Heath in 1929.

== See also ==
- List of census-designated places in Illinois
- Shady Rest
