= Tipsword =

Tipsword is a surname. It could refer to:

- Dennis Tipsword, American politician
- Rolland F. Tipsword (1925–2007), American lawyer, judge, and politician

== See also ==
- Tasword
