= Blue Ridge, Illinois =

- Unincorporated community
- Location within Illinois Location within the United States
- Coordinates: 40°16′04″N 88°29′17″W
- Country: United States
- State: Illinois
- County: Piatt
- Township: Blue Ridge
- Elevation: 787 ft (240 m)
- Time zone: UTC-6 (Central (CST))
  - Summer (DST): UTC-5 (CDT)
- Area code: 217
- GNIS feature ID: 422478

Blue Ridge is an unincorporated community in Blue Ridge Township Piatt County, Illinois, United States, on County Route 10 and the Norfolk Southern Railway, 4 miles (6.4 km) north-northeast of Mansfield.
