= Blue Ridge Township =

Blue Ridge Township may refer to:

- Blue Ridge Township, Howard County, Arkansas, in Howard County, Arkansas
- Blue Ridge Township, Piatt County, Illinois
- Blue Ridge Township, Henderson County, North Carolina, in Henderson County, North Carolina
- Blue Ridge Township, Watauga County, North Carolina, in Watauga County, North Carolina
- Blue Ridge Township, Williams County, North Dakota, in Williams County, North Dakota
