= Sangamon Township, Piatt County, Illinois =

Sangamon Township
- Township
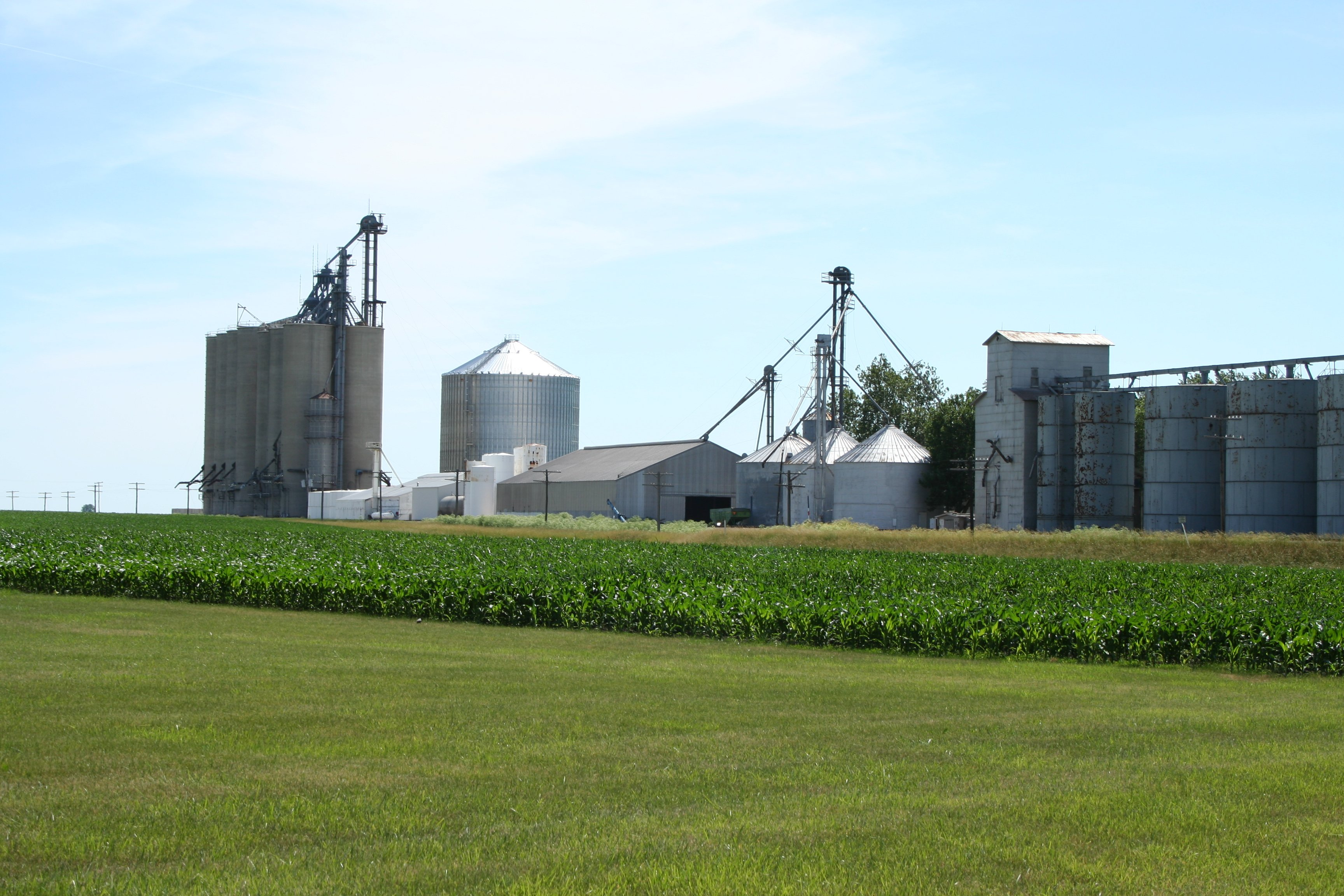
- Grain elevators in the unincorporated hamlet of Galesville, in section 32 of Sangamon township.

- Location in Piatt County

- Piatt County's location in Illinois
- Coordinates: 40°06′40″N 88°30′52″W
- Country: United States
- State: Illinois
- County: Piatt
- Established: November 8, 1859

Area
  - Total: 47.25 sq mi (122.4 km^{2})
  - Land: 47.18 sq mi (122.2 km^{2})
  - Water: 0.06 sq mi (0.16 km^{2}) 0.13%
- Elevation: 673 ft (205 m)

Population (2010)
  - Estimate (2016): 2,351
  - Density: 50/sq mi (19/km^{2})
- Time zone: UTC-6 (CST)
  - Summer (DST): UTC-5 (CDT)
- FIPS code: 17-147-67587
- Website: sangamontwp.org

Sangamon Township is a township in Piatt County, Illinois, USA. As of the 2010 census, its population was 2,357 and it contained 929 housing units.

== Geography ==
According to the 2010 census, the township has a total area of 47.25 square miles (122.4 km^{2}), of which 47.18 square miles (122.2 km^{2}) (or 99.85%) is land and 0.06 square miles (0.16 km^{2}) (or 0.13%) is water. Lakes in this township include Buck Pond (historical). The stream of Madden Creek runs through this township.

=== Cities and towns ===
- Monticello (northeast three-quarters)

=== Unincorporated towns ===
- Galesville
- Lodge
- White Heath

=== Extinct towns ===
- Centerville

=== Adjacent townships ===
- Blue Ridge Township (north)
- Mahomet Township, Champaign County (northeast)
- Scott Township, Champaign County (east)
- Colfax Township, Champaign County (southeast)
- Monticello Township (south)
- Goose Creek Township (west)

=== Cemeteries ===
The township contains nine cemeteries: Argo, Boyer, Bucks Pond, Camp Creek, Hughes, Ingram, Mackey, Madden and Mallory.

=== Major highways ===
- Interstate 72
- Illinois State Route 10

=== Airports and landing strips ===
- Clapper Airport

== Demographics ==
Historical population
Census	Pop.	Note	%±
2016 (est.)	2,351
U.S. Decennial Census
