= James P. Ownby =

American politician

James Polk Ownby (April 22, 1845 – April 12, 1906) was an American politician and farmer.

Ownby was born in Bedford County, Virginia. In 1859, he moved to Callaway County, Missouri. Ownby moved to Piatt County, Illinois and settled in Monticello, Illinois. He was a farmer. Ownby served in the Illinois House of Representatives in 1895 and 1896 and was a Democrat. Ownby died at his son's home in La Place, Illinois.
