= Bryant Cottage State Historic Site =

- Bryant House
- U.S. National Register of Historic Places
- Illinois State Historic Site
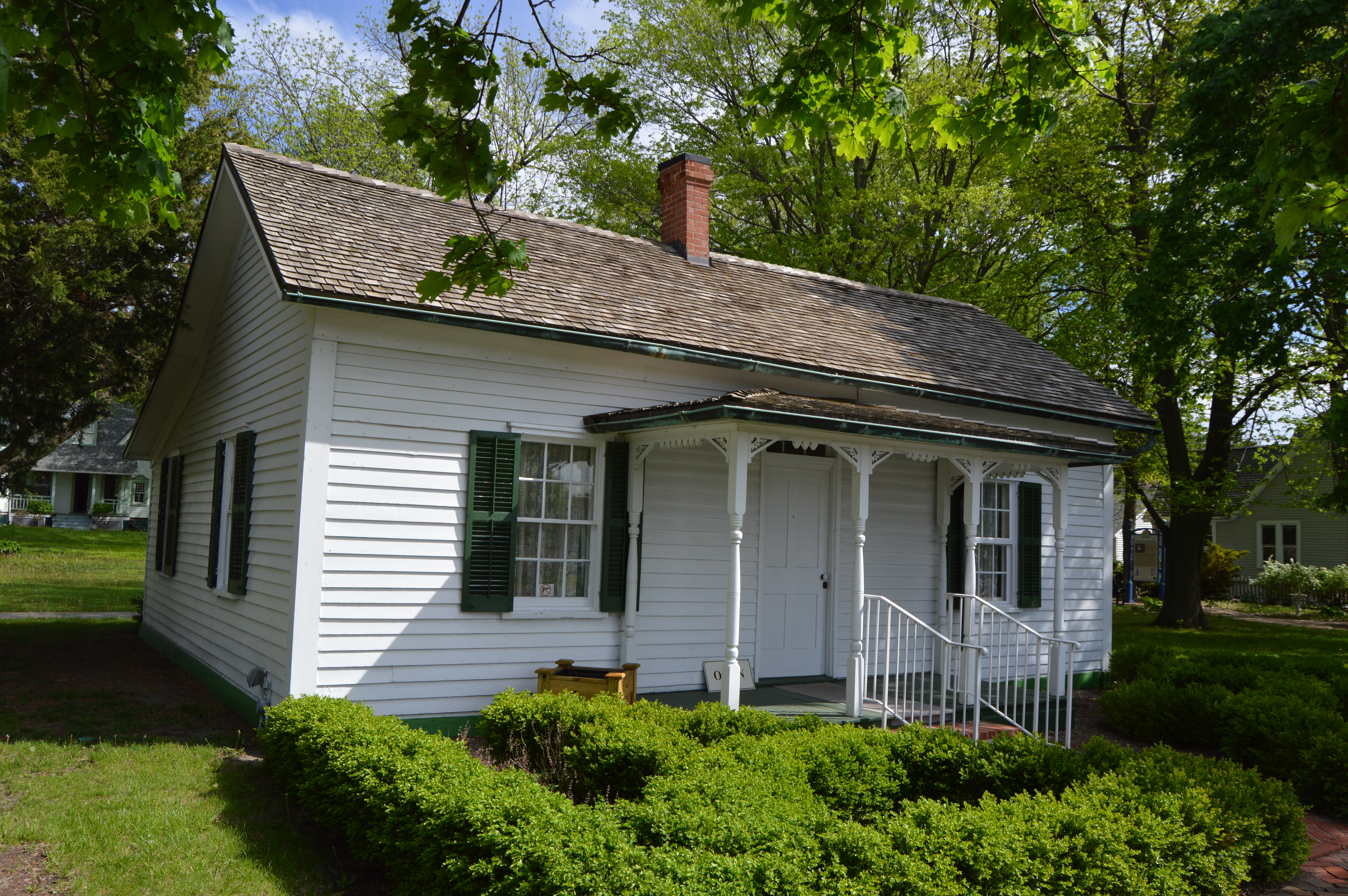

- Location within Illinois Location within the United States
- Location: 146 E. Wilson St, Bement, Illinois
- Coordinates: 39.923299°N 88.572081°W
- Area: less than one acre
- Built: 1856
- Architectural style: vernacular, hall-and-parlor
- NRHP reference No.: 100001566
- Added to NRHP: September 5, 2017

The Bryant Cottage State Historic Site is a simple four-room house located in Bement, Illinois in the U.S. state of Illinois. It was built in 1856 and is preserved by the Illinois Department of Natural Resources as an example of Piatt County, Illinois pioneer architecture and as a key historic site in the 1858 Lincoln-Douglas debates.

== Francis E. Bryant ==
Few settlers moved to southern Piatt County, in east-central Illinois, until the 1850s and the coming of the railroad. The ground was flat and open, with few trees to provide firewood for winter. Francis E. Bryant arrived in the young town of Bement in 1856 with a small capital, which he quickly reinvested in general business development as a banker and storekeeper. He bought grain from pioneer farmers, and sold them lumber and coal in return.

Bryant was a member of the U.S. Democratic Party and a personal friend of Senator Stephen A. Douglas, who was running for re-election in 1858. Bryant played an important role in coordinating Democratic support for Douglas during the race.

As a Democrat, Bryant was elected twice to the Illinois Legislature. His first term in 1853 was as the representative of Schuyler County. He served again 20 years later in 1873 as a representative of Champaign County, Illinois and Piatt County, Illinois.

== Stephen A. Douglas ==
As an incumbent member of the U.S. Senate from Illinois in 1858, Douglas had not expected to have to make a case directly to the people. Under Article I of the U.S. Constitution then in effect, members of the federal Senate were chosen by the state legislatures, not by the voters.

However, Douglas's central position in the growing crisis of American slavery made the election of 1858 extraordinary. Fervent emotions among both Democrats and members of the newly formed Republican party led to a demand that both candidates for the Senate campaign directly among the people of Illinois.

The Republicans nominated Springfield, Illinois lawyer Abraham Lincoln, who wrote to Douglas on July 24, 1858, challenging him to meet and hold a series of nine debates at sites across Illinois. Lincoln renewed this challenge when the two men met in person on the Bement-Monticello road, now Illinois Route 105, on July 29.

The campaigning Douglas was at the time going southward to Bement, where he would spend the night in the Bryant Cottage. It was during this one-night stay that Douglas decided to accept most of Lincoln's challenge and debate him seven times. Douglas wrote Lincoln from Bement on the morning of July 30, suggesting that the two men debate in Ottawa, Freeport, Jonesboro, Charleston, Galesburg, Quincy, and Alton, Illinois.

Lincoln accepted these terms in a letter dated July 31.

== Abraham Lincoln ==
At the time of the Lincoln-Douglas challenge of July 1858, Stephen A. Douglas was an experienced, incumbent U.S. Senator; Abraham Lincoln was a lawyer in private practice with little successful office-holding experience. Illinois Republicans had nominated him to face Douglas because of his skill at making speeches and his ability to frame the issue of slavery in a manner that conveyed visceral opposition to the institution without antagonizing racist American voters.

Douglas had every reason to avoid Lincoln's challenge to debate. As the incumbent, he had an advantage in terms of name recognition. The senator chose to voluntarily debate his challenger because he agreed with Lincoln that slavery was a growing crisis and because he had faith that his own doctrine of popular sovereignty would create a solution to the dilemma.

At first, Douglas appeared to be the winner in this challenge. His legislative candidates defeated the Republicans in November 1858, thereby assuring Douglas's re-election as U.S. senator. However, Lincoln and Douglas re-visited the issue of slavery in the U.S. presidential election of 1860. And in this final contest between the two men, Lincoln was the victor.

== Local folklore ==
After the deaths of both Douglas and Lincoln, the Bryant family came to believe that the two men had met in person in the parlor of the Bryant Cottage to negotiate the details of their debates. It is clear that Douglas made the key decision, that of accepting Lincoln's challenge, in the Bryant Cottage, but the surviving letters between the two men appear to indicate that they negotiated on paper after their face-to-face roadside meeting of July 29, 1858. In a Spring 1998 Lincoln Herald article, Jim Fay investigated the claim. Fay argues that there is some evidence to suggest the meeting in the Bryant parlor took place, but that the mystery surrounding it speaks to the wit and secrecy of the candidates.

== Current status ==
In response to state budget cuts, the state of Illinois temporarily closed the Bryant Cottage State Historic Site from October 2008 until April 2009. The site reopened to the public on April 23, 2009.

In September 2017, the Bryant Cottage State Historic Site was listed on the National Register of Historic Places. It was considered for both its folk hall-and-parlor architecture and its connection to the 1858 Lincoln-Douglas Debates.
