= Windsor, Illinois =

Windsor is the name of some places in the U.S. state of Illinois:

- Windsor, Mercer County, Illinois
- Windsor, Shelby County, Illinois
