= King Family Band =

- Also known as: King Family Strings
- Origin: Monticello, Illinois, United States
- Genres: Bluegrass, gospel, country
- Years active: 2002–present
- Members: Tim King, Kim King, Caleb King, Carson King, Rachel King, Kendall King, Rebecca King, Renee King, Robin King
- Website: www.thekingfam.net

The King Family Band (formerly known as The King Family Strings) is an American bluegrass, gospel, and country band from Monticello, Illinois. The band consists of all 9 family members, with the children ranging in age from 10–25.

With eleven years of experience, the Kings put on a high energy show that everyone is sure to enjoy. They excite audiences with banjo and fiddle favorites—such as the "Orange Blossom Special", Dueling Banjos and Rocky Top—as well as standard bluegrass, gospel, country and original music.

The King family first garnered recognition when they won the open stage competition at the Springfield, Illinois Bluegrass Festival, and were invited to Silver Dollar City's Youth in Bluegrass Festival.

== History and achievements ==
The beginnings of the band started with the purchase of a violin at a local music shop's sidewalk sale. Tim and Kim King had four children at the time, with the oldest one being their five-year-old son Caleb.

The group boasts two state of Illinois banjo champions, two No. 1 RAA radio hits and two proud (most of the time) parents of seven children.

The Kings' fifth CD, released in October 2012, was produced by Pat Holt, who produced legends such as Johnny Cash, James Taylor, Alabama and Charlie Daniels.

The Kings keep a busy tour schedule playing at fairs, churches, art centers, festivals and private events across the country, including concerts in Nashville and Branson. Individually, four of the band's members are state award-winning instrumentalists, and as a group they took 2nd at the 2012 CAM Gospel Sing-Off in Branson. The King Family Band is known for their heart-felt and powerful original music, with Caleb recently labeled a Songwriter to Watch by the Nashville Songwriters Association International.

In 2011 they performed at the world-famous Krannert Center for the Performing Arts in Urbana, IL.

== Discography ==
- Prairie Praise
- En Route
- Redbud Tree (2010)
- Glory Land (2011)
- My Kinda Dream (2012)

== Members ==
- Tim King – bass, vocals
- Kim King – fiddle, vocals
- Caleb King – banjo, guitar, fiddle, vocals
- Carson King – banjo, fiddle, vocals
- Rachel King – guitar, fiddle, bass, vocals
- Kendall King – mandolin, fiddle vocals
- Rebecca King – dobro, fiddle, banjo vocals
- Renee King – guitar, fiddle, vocals
- Robin King – fiddle, vocals
