= Amenia, Illinois =

- Unincorporated community
- Location within Illinois Location within the United States
- Coordinates: 40°01′19″N 88°39′59″W
- Country: United States
- State: Illinois
- County: Piatt
- Elevation: 689 ft (210 m)
- Time zone: UTC-6 (Central (CST))
  - Summer (DST): UTC-5 (CDT)
- Area code: 217
- GNIS feature ID: 422406

Amenia is an unincorporated community in Piatt County, in the U.S. state of Illinois.

The community was named after Amenia, New York, the native home of an early settler.
