= Galesville, Illinois =

Galesville
- Unincorporated community
- Location within Illinois
- Coordinates: 40°09′19″N 088°33′23″W
- Country: United States
- State: Illinois
- County: Piatt
- Township: Sangamon
- Elevation: 715 ft (218 m)
- ZIP code: 61854
- GNIS feature ID: 0408848

Galesville is an unincorporated community in Sangamon Township, Piatt County, Illinois, United States.

== Geography ==
Galesville is located at 40°09′19″N 088°33′23″W at an elevation of 715 feet.
