= Lodge, Illinois =

Lodge
- Unincorporated community
- Location within Illinois
- Coordinates: 40°06′22″N 088°33′36″W
- Country: United States
- State: Illinois
- County: Piatt
- Township: Sangamon
- Elevation: 699 ft (213 m)
- ZIP code: 61856
- GNIS feature ID: 0412501

Lodge is an unincorporated community in Sangamon Township, Piatt County, Illinois, United States.

== Geography ==
Lodge is located at an elevation of 699 feet.
