= Monticello Courthouse Square Historic District =

Historic district in Illinois, United States

- U.S. National Register of Historic Places
- U.S. Historic district
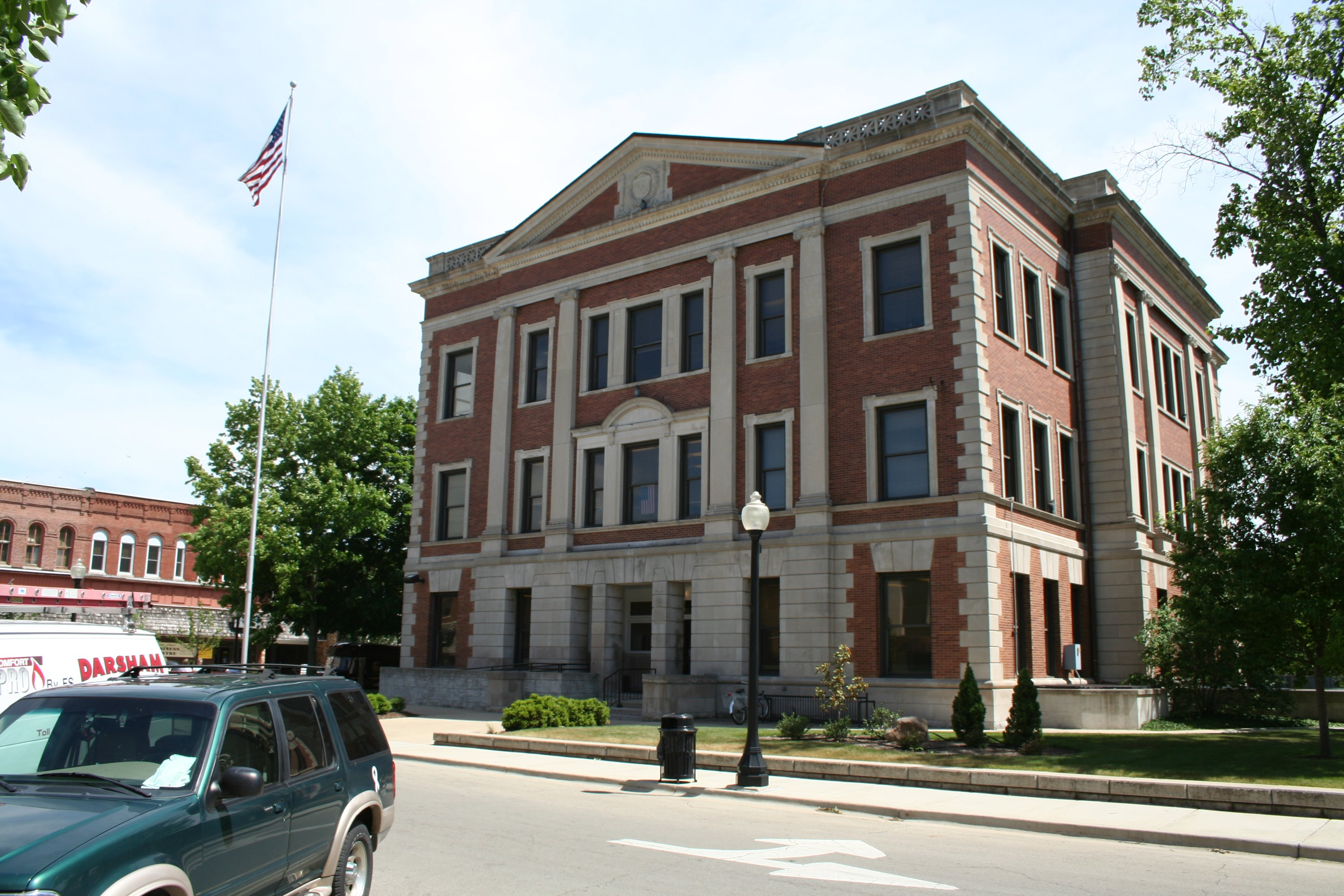
- Piatt County Courthouse

- Location within Illinois Location within the United States
- Interactive map showing the location for Monticello County Courthouse Square Historic District
- Location: Roughly bounded by Market, RR tracks, N. Hamilton, Independence & Marion Sts., Monticello, Illinois
- Coordinates: 40°1′30″N 88°34′21″W
- Area: 28 acres (11 ha)
- Architectural style: Italianate, Classical Revival
- NRHP reference No.: 08000400
- Added to NRHP: November 5, 2009

The Monticello Courthouse Square Historic District is a historic district in downtown Monticello, Illinois. The district includes the historic commercial center of the city, the county seat of Piatt County, and is centered on the Piatt County Courthouse. 80 buildings are included in the district, 73 of which are considered contributing to its historic character. The district was added to the National Register of Historic Places on November 5, 2009.

== History ==
Monticello was founded in 1837 as a commercial center for the future Piatt County, which was considered too far from Decatur to reasonably conduct trade there. The original town plat covers all but four blocks of the historic district, with the remainder coming from one of the city's first additions. When Piatt County was formed in 1841, Monticello was named the county seat, and its population and development both increased in the ensuing years. Merchant J.C. Johnson built the city's first brick building at 204-206 West Washington Street in 1856; the building is the oldest surviving structure in the district. In the same year, Monticello gained its own newspaper, the Monticello Times, and the county built a new courthouse. Development accelerated further after the Illinois Central Railroad and Chicago and Paducah Railroad began service to Monticello in the 1870s. The city received a major civic development in 1897, when the Town Hall and Opera House and the Allerton Library both opened in a new building. The third county courthouse, which still serves as the seat of county government, was built in 1903-04; by this point, the courthouse square had become the established center of local commerce.

== Architecture ==
The Piatt County Courthouse, the focal point of the district, is a Classical Revival building designed by Urbana architect Joseph W. Royer. The three-story building is built with red brick and features limestone decorations. Each side of the building features an entrance pavilion. On the north and south sides, the pavilions are divided by Ionic pilasters topped by a belt course; the east and west pavilions are projecting and have two pilasters each. Triangular pediments with dentillated cornices top these two facades, and a balustrade encircles the roof of the building. The courthouse's corners, including those on the projecting pavilions, feature limestone quoins.

The Italianate style is most prevalent among the district's commercial buildings, as 25 buildings feature the style. The prevalence of the style is a reflection of the district's growth in the late 19th century, the peak of the style's popularity in America. Several of the Italianate buildings feature cast iron storefronts, a popular decorative feature for commercial buildings at the time. The district also features eighteen vernacular interpretations of the Commercial Style. The Romanesque Revival style makes a prominent appearance in the town hall and library building, which features a stone arched entrance and contrasting brickwork and stonework. Other styles featured in the district include the Gothic Revival style in the First Presbyterian Church; the Stick Style in the Wabash Depot; the Dutch Colonial Revival style in two houses; and the Streamline Moderne style in the Country Charm Dairy Bar.
