= Rolland F. Tipsword =

American lawyer, judge, and politician

Rolland F. Tipsword (August 19, 1925 – April 5, 2007) was an American lawyer, judge, and politician.

Tipsword was born in Monticello, Illinois. He graduated from the Beecher City Community Unit High School in Beecher, Illinois in 1943. He served in the United States Navy during World War II in the Pacific Ocean. He received his bachelor's degree from University of Idaho in 1949 and received his law degree Northwestern University Pritzker School of Law in 1951. Tipsword was admitted to the Illinois bar in 1951 and practiced law in Taylorville, Illinois. Tipsword served as the state's attorney for Christian County, Illinois and was a Democrat. He served in the Illinois House of Representatives from 1966 to 1979. Tipsword served as an Illinois circuit court judge from 1983 to 1993. Tipsword died at St. Vincent's Hospital in Taylorville, Illinois.
