= Bement, Illinois =

Bement
- Village
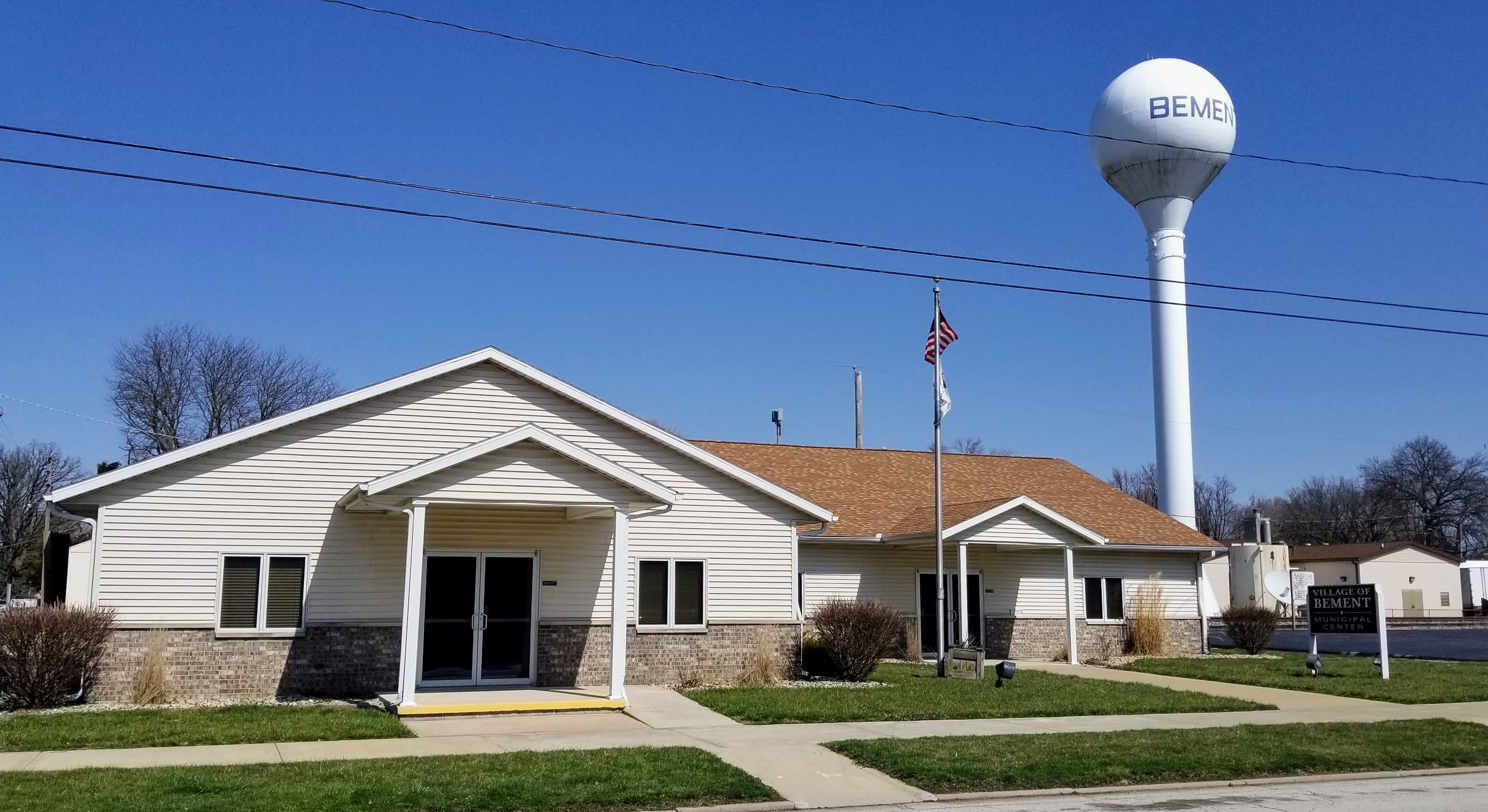
- Bement municipal center

- Location of Bement in Piatt County, Illinois.
- Coordinates: 39°55′23″N 88°34′21″W
- Country: United States
- State: Illinois
- County: Piatt
- Township: Bement

Area
  - Total: 0.78 sq mi (2.01 km^{2})
  - Land: 0.78 sq mi (2.01 km^{2})
  - Water: 0 sq mi (0.00 km^{2})
- Elevation: 689 ft (210 m)

Population (2020)
  - Total: 1,484
  - Density: 1,907.5/sq mi (736.48/km^{2})
- Time zone: UTC-6 (CST)
  - Summer (DST): UTC-5 (CDT)
- ZIP Code(s): 61813
- Area code: 217
- FIPS code: 17-05144
- GNIS ID: 2398092

Bement is a village in Piatt County, Illinois, United States. Its population was 1,484 at the 2020 census.

== Geography ==
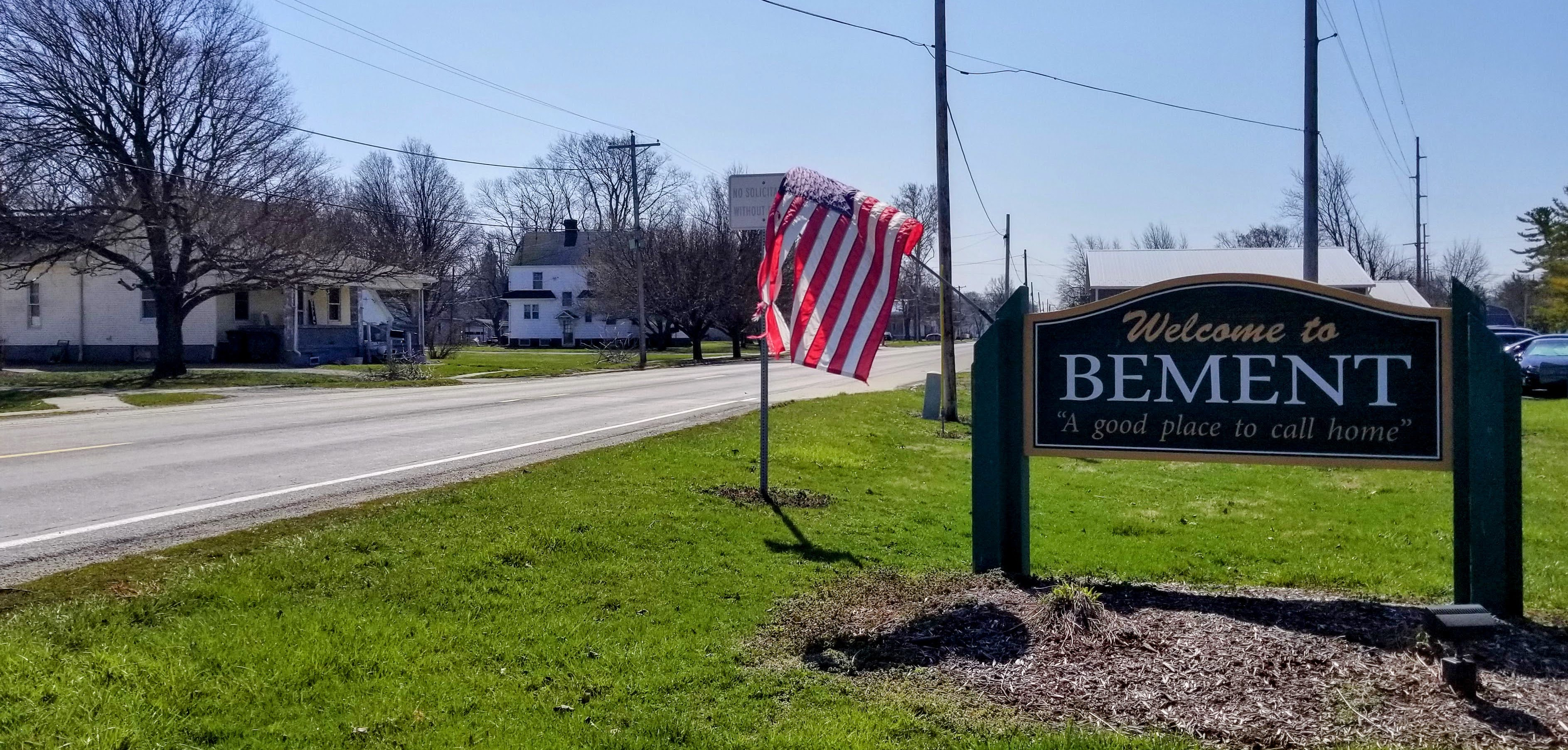
Bement welcome sign

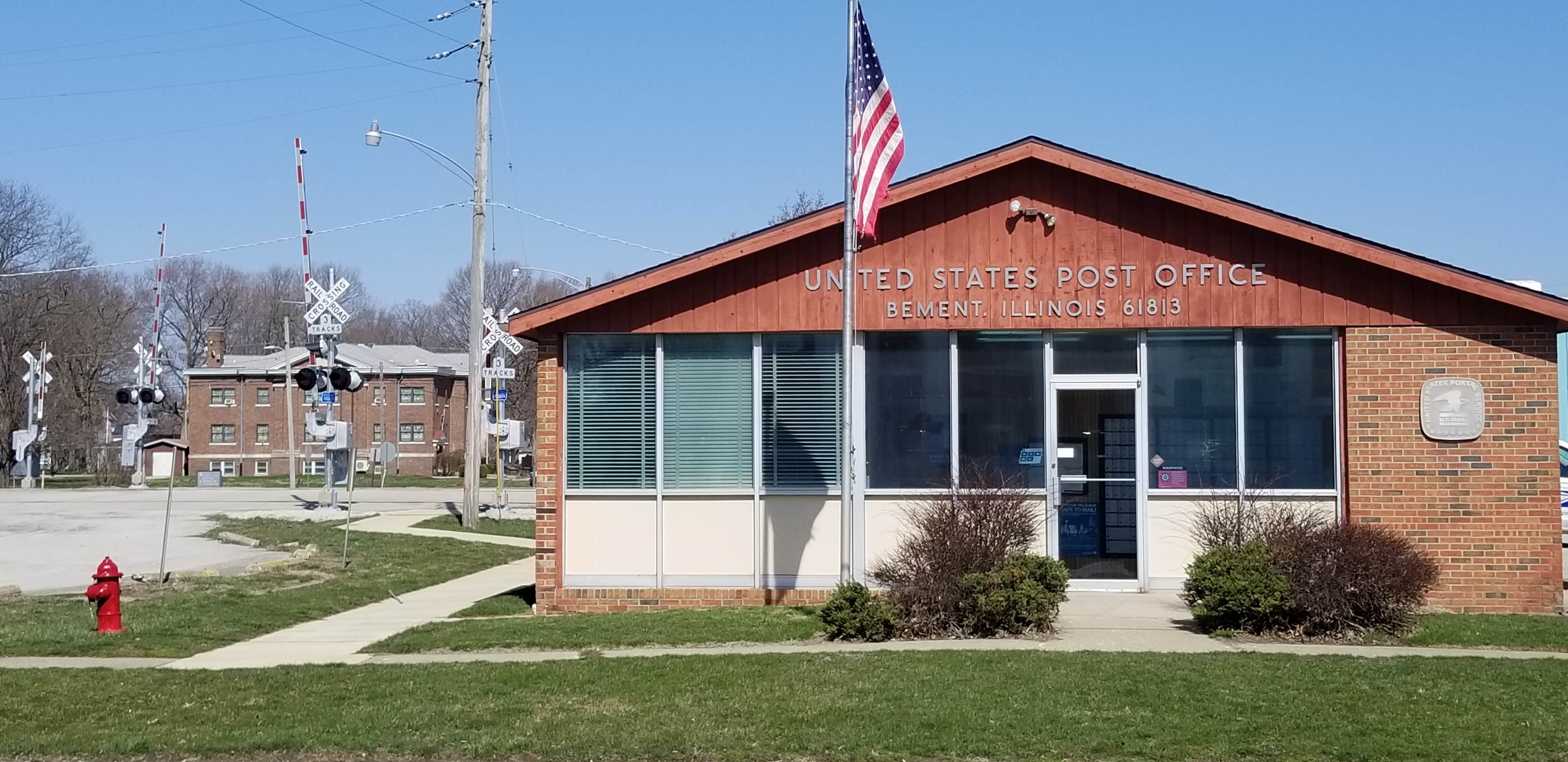
Bement post office

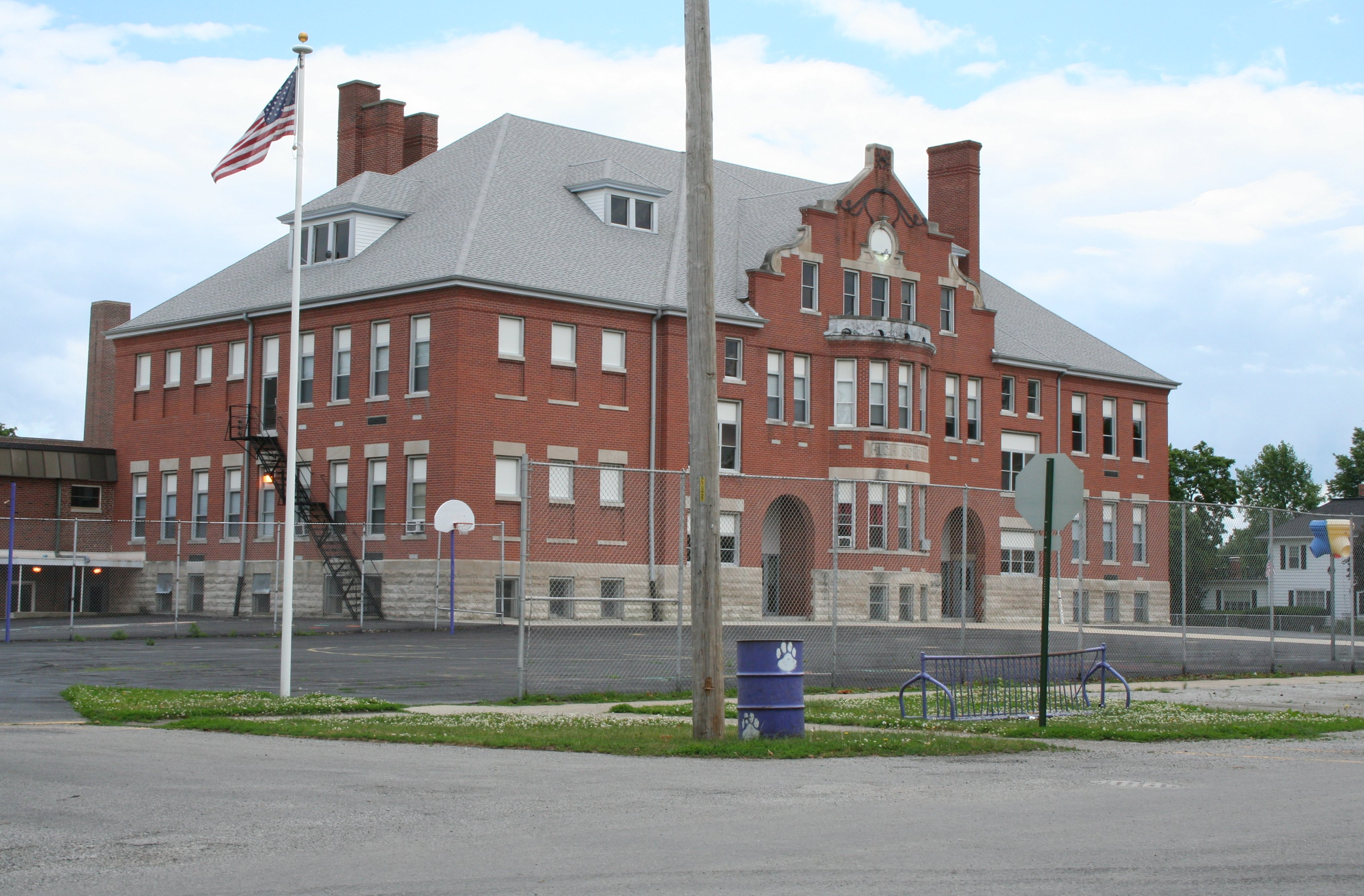
Bement, Illinois Elementary and Middle School

According to the 2010 census, Bement has a total area of 0.81 square miles (2.10 km^{2}), all land.

== Demographics ==
Historical population
Census	Pop.	Note	%±
1880	963		—
1890	1,129		17.2%
1900	1,484		31.4%
1910	1,530		3.1%
1920	1,663		8.7%
1930	1,517		−8.8%
1940	1,466		−3.4%
1950	1,459		−0.5%
1960	1,558		6.8%
1970	1,638		5.1%
1980	1,770		8.1%
1990	1,668		−5.8%
2000	1,784		7.0%
2010	1,730		−3.0%
2020	1,484		−14.2%
U.S. Decennial Census

=== 2020 census ===
As of the 2020 census, Bement had a population of 1,484. The median age was 44.7 years. 18.5% of residents were under the age of 18 and 19.7% of residents were 65 years of age or older. For every 100 females there were 93.2 males, and for every 100 females age 18 and over there were 94.2 males age 18 and over.

0.0% of residents lived in urban areas, while 100.0% lived in rural areas.

There were 633 households in Bement, of which 25.4% had children under the age of 18 living in them. Of all households, 47.2% were married-couple households, 19.3% were households with a male householder and no spouse or partner present, and 25.4% were households with a female householder and no spouse or partner present. About 30.3% of all households were made up of individuals and 14.4% had someone living alone who was 65 years of age or older.

There were 708 housing units, of which 10.6% were vacant. The homeowner vacancy rate was 2.8% and the rental vacancy rate was 7.0%.

Racial composition as of the 2020 census
Race	Number	Percent
White	1,390	93.7%
Black or African American	9	0.6%
American Indian and Alaska Native	1	0.1%
Asian	6	0.4%
Native Hawaiian and Other Pacific Islander	1	0.1%
Some other race	12	0.8%
Two or more races	65	4.4%
Hispanic or Latino (of any race)	19	1.3%

=== 2000 census ===
As of the 2000 census, there were 1,784 people, 687 households, and 485 families residing in the village. The population density was 2,197.1 inhabitants per square mile (848.3/km^{2}). There were 723 housing units at an average density of 890.4 per square mile (343.8/km^{2}). The racial makeup of the village was 98.37% White, 0.90% African American, 0.22% Asian, 0.11% from other races, and 0.39% from two or more races. Hispanic or Latino of any race were 0.34% of the population.

There were 687 households, out of which 31.7% had children under the age of 18 living with them, 58.5% were married couples living together, 8.7% had a female householder with no husband present, and 29.4% were non-families. 25.6% of all households were made up of individuals, and 12.1% had someone living alone who was 65 years of age or older. The average household size was 2.48 and the average family size was 2.97.

In the village, the population was spread out, with 23.7% under the age of 18, 8.2% from 18 to 24, 29.1% from 25 to 44, 21.8% from 45 to 64, and 17.2% who were 65 years of age or older. The median age was 38 years. For every 100 females, there were 96.5 males. For every 100 females age 18 and over, there were 91.8 males.

The median household income was $40,163, and the median family income was $47,652. Males had a median income of $30,641 versus $21,944 for females. The per capita income for the village was $17,995. About 3.1% of families and 6.2% of the population were below the poverty line, including 5.4% of those under age 18 and 5.7% of those age 65 or over.

== Bryant Cottage ==
Bryant Cottage is located in Bement. Built in 1856 by Francis E. Bryant, it is now preserved as an example of pioneer architecture and as an important historic site. Due to budget cuts, Bryant Cottage was scheduled to close, even though it is an important landmark in Abraham Lincoln's political career. However, because of local efforts, Bryant Cottage has remained open to the public.
