= Blue Ridge Township, Piatt County, Illinois =

Blue Ridge Township
- Township
- Location in Piatt County

- Piatt County's location in Illinois
- Coordinates: 40°13′18″N 88°32′42″W
- Country: United States
- State: Illinois
- County: Piatt
- Established: November 8, 1859

Area
  - Total: 63.71 sq mi (165.0 km^{2})
  - Land: 63.65 sq mi (164.9 km^{2})
  - Water: 0.06 sq mi (0.16 km^{2}) 0.09%
- Elevation: 728 ft (222 m)

Population (2010)
  - Estimate (2016): 1,445
  - Density: 23.3/sq mi (9.0/km^{2})
- Time zone: UTC-6 (CST)
  - Summer (DST): UTC-5 (CDT)
- FIPS code: 17-147-06808

Blue Ridge Township is a township in Piatt County, Illinois, USA. As of the 2010 census, its population was 1,480 and it contained 641 housing units.

== Geography ==
According to the 2010 census, the township has a total area of 63.71 square miles (165.0 km^{2}), of which 63.65 square miles (164.9 km^{2}) (or 99.91%) is land and 0.06 square miles (0.16 km^{2}) (or 0.09%) is water.

=== Cities and towns ===
- Mansfield

=== Extinct towns ===
- Blue Ridge
- Harris

=== Adjacent townships ===
- Bellflower Township, McLean County (north)
- Mahomet Township, Champaign County (east)
- Newcomb Township, Champaign County (east)
- Sangamon Township (south)
- Goose Creek Township (southwest)
- Santa Anna Township, DeWitt County (west)
- West Township, McLean County (northwest)

=== Cemeteries ===
- Blue Ridge
- Dunkard
- Mansfield

=== Event venues ===
- The RAS hanger

=== Major highways ===
- Interstate 74
- U.S. Route 150

=== Airports and landing strips ===
- Ashworth Landing Strip
- Marvin D Bradd Airport
- Niklaus RLA Airport
- Robert Armstead Ashworth Airport
- Van Gorder Airport
- Weidner Landing Field

== Demographics ==
As of 2023, Blue Ridge Township has a median age of 46.6 years old. Their median household income is approximately 50,000 dollars. 40% of residents hold at least a high school degree as education. However, approximately 10% of people have a bachelor's degree or higher and 30% are left with no formal education.
