= Piatt County, Illinois =

County in Illinois, United States

- County
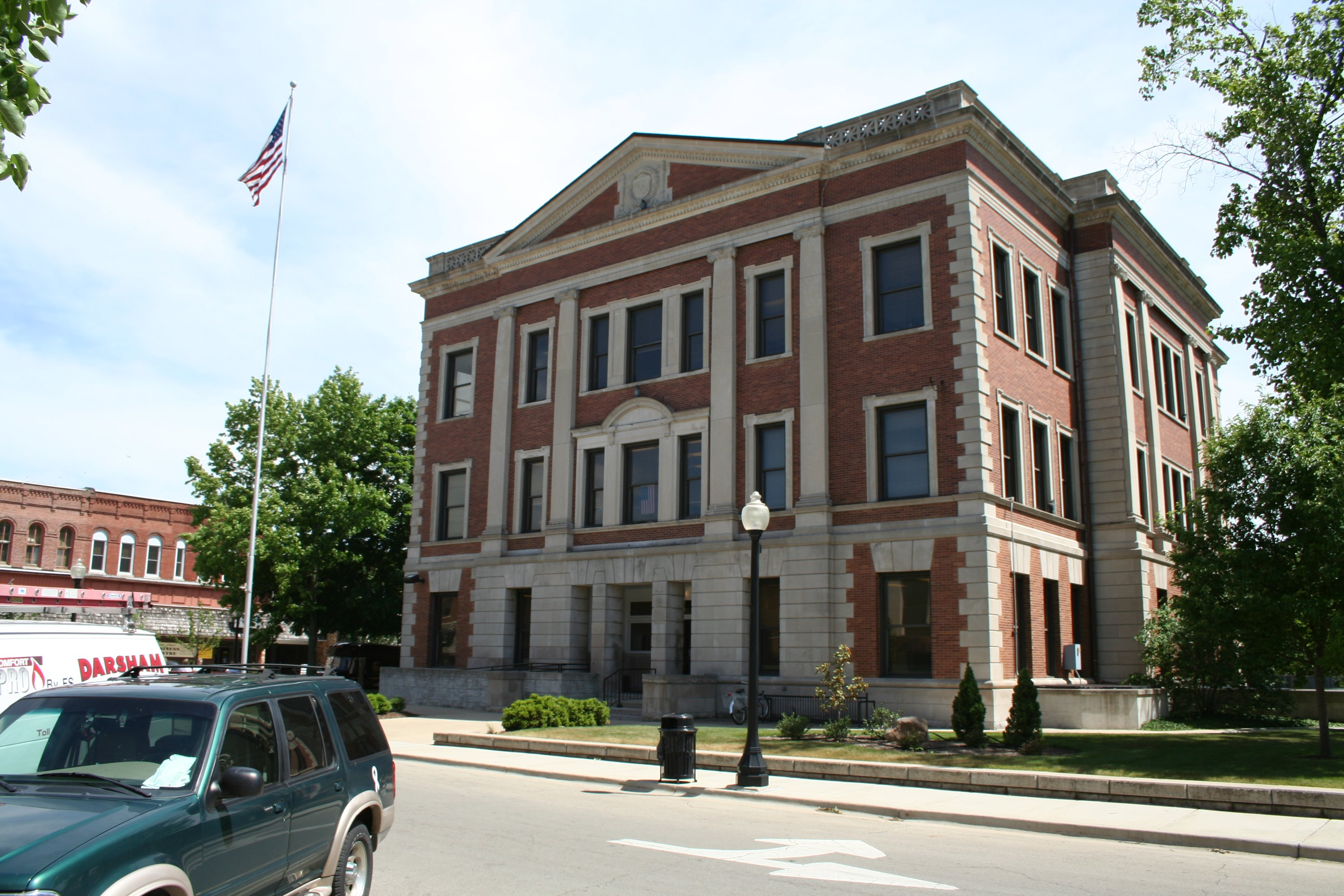
- Piatt County Courthouse in Monticello

- Location within the U.S. state of Illinois
- Coordinates: 40°01′N 88°35′W
- Country: United States
- State: Illinois
- Founded: 1841
- Named for: James A. Piatt
- Seat: Monticello
- Largest city: Monticello

Area
  - Total: 439 sq mi (1,140 km^{2})
  - Land: 439 sq mi (1,140 km^{2})
  - Water: 0.3 sq mi (0.78 km^{2}) 0.06%

Population (2020)
  - Total: 16,673
  - Estimate (2025): 16,791 ▲
  - Density: 38.0/sq mi (14.7/km^{2})
- Time zone: UTC−6 (Central)
  - Summer (DST): UTC−5 (CDT)
- Congressional districts: 13th, 15th
- Website: piatt.gov

Piatt County is a county in Illinois, United States. As of the 2020 United States census, it had a population of 16,673. Its county seat and largest city is Monticello. Piatt County is part of the Champaign–Urbana metropolitan area.

== History ==
The first settler was George Haworth, a Quaker, followed by James Martin, Abraham Hanline, Solomon Carter, and William Cordell.

Piatt County was formed in 1841 from Macon and DeWitt counties. Two local residents, James A. Piatt and Jesse Warner, were instrumental in forming the county, and it was named for Piatt after he won a coin toss against Warner.

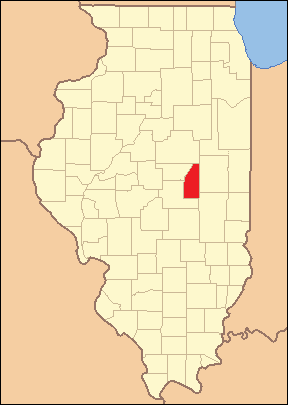
Piatt County at the time of its creation in 1841

Abraham Lincoln practiced law in Piatt County as a lawyer on the Eighth Judicial Circuit. On July 29, 1858, Lincoln and Stephen A. Douglas met by chance on the road between Monticello and Bement, and that evening conferred at Bryant Cottage in Bement to arrange the Lincoln–Douglas debates. A marker south of Monticello commemorates the roadside meeting, and the cottage is preserved as a state historic site.

The first courthouse was begun in 1843 and completed in 1846. It was replaced by the current Piatt County Courthouse in 1904.

== Geography ==
According to the US Census Bureau, the county has a total area of 439 square miles (1,140 km^{2}), of which 439 square miles (1,140 km^{2}) is land and 0.3 square miles (0.78 km^{2}) (0.06%) is water.

=== Climate and weather ===
Monticello, Illinois

Climate chart (precipitation, max. and min. temperature)
J	F	M	A	M	J	J	A	S	O	N	D
1.6 32 14	1.7 37 19	3 49 30	3.4 62 40	4 73 51	4 83 60	3.8 85 64	4 84 62	2.9 78 54	2.6 66 42	2.9 49 31	2.4 36 21
- █ Average max. and min. temperatures in °F
- █ Precipitation totals in inches
- Source: The Weather Channel
Metric conversion
J	F	M	A	M	J	J	A	S	O	N	D
41 0 −10	42 3 −7	75 9 −1	87 17 4	100 23 11	101 28 16	97 29 18	101 29 17	72 26 12	65 19 6	72 9 −1	62 2 −6
- █ Average max. and min. temperatures in °C
- █ Precipitation totals in mm

In recent years, average temperatures in the county seat of Monticello have ranged from a low of 14 °F (−10 °C) in January to a high of 85 °F (29 °C) in July, although a record low of −25 °F (−32 °C) was recorded in January 1999 and a record high of 105 °F (41 °C) was recorded in July 1966. Average monthly precipitation ranged from 1.61 inches (41 mm) in January to 3.99 inches (101 mm) in August.

=== Major highways ===
- Interstate 72
- Interstate 74
- U.S. Route 36
- U.S. Route 150
- Illinois Route 10
- Illinois Route 32
- Illinois Route 48
- Illinois Route 105

=== Adjacent counties ===
- McLean County (north)
- Champaign County (east)
- Douglas County (southeast)
- Moultrie County (south)
- Macon County (southwest)
- DeWitt County (west)

== Demographics ==
Historical population
Census	Pop.	Note	%±
1850	1,606		—
1860	6,127		281.5%
1870	10,953		78.8%
1880	15,583		42.3%
1890	17,062		9.5%
1900	17,706		3.8%
1910	16,376		−7.5%
1920	15,714		−4.0%
1930	15,588		−0.8%
1940	14,659		−6.0%
1950	13,970		−4.7%
1960	14,960		7.1%
1970	15,509		3.7%
1980	16,581		6.9%
1990	15,548		−6.2%
2000	16,365		5.3%
2010	16,729		2.2%
2020	16,673		−0.3%
2025 (est.)	16,791	▲	0.7%
US Decennial Census; 1790-1960 1900-1990; 1990-2000 2010-2013

=== 2020 census ===
Piatt County, Illinois – Racial and ethnic composition Note: the US Census treats Hispanic/Latino as an ethnic category. This table excludes Latinos from the racial categories and assigns them to a separate category. Hispanics/Latinos may be of any race.
Race / Ethnicity (NH = Non-Hispanic)	Pop 1980	Pop 1990	Pop 2000	Pop 2010	Pop 2020	% 1980	% 1990	% 2000	% 2010	% 2020
White alone (NH)	16,469	15,478	16,090	16,276	15,600	99.32%	99.55%	98.32%	97.29%	93.56%
Black or African American alone (NH)	13	8	39	56	83	0.08%	0.05%	0.24%	0.33%	0.50%
Native American or Alaska Native alone (NH)	13	16	12	28	23	0.08%	0.10%	0.07%	0.17%	0.14%
Asian alone (NH)	20	11	20	49	80	0.12%	0.07%	0.12%	0.29%	0.48%
Native Hawaiian or Pacific Islander alone (NH)	x	x	2	6	1	x	x	0.01%	0.04%	0.01%
Other race alone (NH)	2	0	10	12	51	0.01%	0.00%	0.06%	0.07%	0.31%
Mixed race or Multiracial (NH)	x	x	91	135	588	x	x	0.56%	0.81%	3.53%
Hispanic or Latino (any race)	64	35	101	167	247	0.39%	0.23%	0.62%	1.00%	1.48%
Total	16,581	15,548	16,365	16,729	16,673	100.00%	100.00%	100.00%	100.00%	100.00%

As of the 2020 census, the county had a population of 16,673, the median age was 43.7 years, 22.3% of residents were under the age of 18, and 21.1% of residents were 65 years of age or older. For every 100 females there were 96.9 males, and for every 100 females age 18 and over there were 95.1 males age 18 and over.

The racial makeup of the county was 94.1% White, 0.5% Black or African American, 0.1% American Indian and Alaska Native, 0.5% Asian, less than 0.1% Native Hawaiian and Pacific Islander, 0.5% from some other race, and 4.2% from two or more races. Hispanic or Latino residents of any race comprised 1.5% of the population.

35.9% of residents lived in urban areas, while 64.1% lived in rural areas.

There were 6,818 households in the county, of which 29.5% had children under the age of 18 living in them. Of all households, 56.9% were married-couple households, 15.7% were households with a male householder and no spouse or partner present, and 21.5% were households with a female householder and no spouse or partner present. About 25.9% of all households were made up of individuals and 13.3% had someone living alone who was 65 years of age or older.

There were 7,360 housing units, of which 7.4% were vacant. Among occupied housing units, 81.1% were owner-occupied and 18.9% were renter-occupied. The homeowner vacancy rate was 2.1% and the rental vacancy rate was 8.6%.

=== 2010 census ===
As of the 2010 United States census, there were 16,729 people, 6,782 households, and 4,823 families residing in the county. The population density was 38.1 inhabitants per square mile (14.7/km^{2}). There were 7,269 housing units at an average density of 16.6 per square mile (6.4/km^{2}). The racial makeup of the county was 98.0% white, 0.3% black or African American, 0.3% Asian, 0.2% American Indian, 0.2% from other races, and 0.9% from two or more races. Those of Hispanic or Latino origin made up 1.0% of the population. In terms of ancestry, 26.1% were German, 21.9% were American, 15.2% were English, and 13.4% were Irish.

Of the 6,782 households, 32.0% had children under the age of 18 living with them, 59.4% were married couples living together, 8.0% had a female householder with no husband present, 28.9% were non-families, and 24.5% of all households were made up of individuals. The average household size was 2.46 and the average family size was 2.92. The median age was 42.6 years.

The median income for a household in the county was $55,752 and the median income for a family was $65,850. Males had a median income of $50,425 versus $32,304 for females. The per capita income for the county was $26,492. About 5.1% of families and 7.6% of the population were below the poverty line, including 10.8% of those under age 18 and 4.5% of those age 65 or over.

== Communities ==
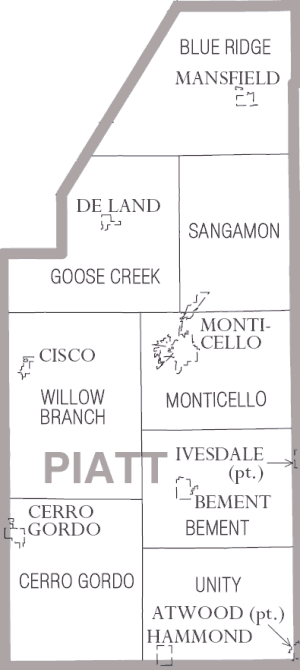
Map of Piatt County, Illinois

=== City ===
- Monticello (seat)

=== Villages ===
- Atwood (partial)
- Bement
- Cerro Gordo
- Cisco
- De Land
- Hammond
- Mansfield

=== Census-designated places ===
- La Place
- White Heath

=== Other unincorporated communities ===
- Amenia
- Galesville
- Lodge
- Milmine
- Pierson
- Voorhies

=== Former places ===
- Blue Ridge

=== Townships ===
- Bement
- Blue Ridge
- Cerro Gordo
- Goose Creek
- Monticello
- Sangamon
- Unity
- Willow Branch

== Education ==
Public schools in the county are operated by Monticello Community Unit School District 25, Bement Community Unit School District 5, Cerro Gordo Community Unit School District 100, DeLand-Weldon Community Unit School District 57, and Blue Ridge Community Unit School District 18, the last of which is based in Farmer City in DeWitt County and also serves Mansfield. Students in the Atwood area attend the Arthur-Lovington-Atwood-Hammond district based in Douglas County.

== Politics ==
United States presidential election results for Piatt County, Illinois
Year	Republican		Democratic		Third party(ies)	
Year	No.	%	No.	%	No.	%
1892	2,138	51.08%	1,896	45.29%	152	3.63%
1896	2,579	56.07%	1,958	42.57%	63	1.37%
1900	2,648	57.32%	1,905	41.23%	67	1.45%
1904	2,515	63.24%	1,334	33.54%	128	3.22%
1908	2,349	57.96%	1,530	37.75%	174	4.29%
1912	1,150	30.71%	1,417	37.84%	1,178	31.46%
1916	4,012	55.49%	3,028	41.88%	190	2.63%
1920	4,283	68.16%	1,903	30.28%	98	1.56%
1924	3,799	64.31%	1,733	29.34%	375	6.35%
1928	4,565	69.62%	1,959	29.88%	33	0.50%
1932	3,179	42.71%	4,200	56.43%	64	0.86%
1936	3,931	48.77%	4,084	50.66%	46	0.57%
1940	4,564	55.94%	3,564	43.68%	31	0.38%
1944	3,912	59.38%	2,641	40.09%	35	0.53%
1948	3,646	60.13%	2,361	38.93%	57	0.94%
1952	4,701	67.82%	2,220	32.03%	11	0.16%
1956	4,622	66.23%	2,356	33.76%	1	0.01%
1960	4,506	60.90%	2,889	39.05%	4	0.05%
1964	3,141	44.63%	3,897	55.37%	0	0.00%
1968	3,973	56.28%	2,447	34.66%	639	9.05%
1972	5,057	67.72%	2,394	32.06%	17	0.23%
1976	4,442	55.39%	3,509	43.75%	69	0.86%
1980	4,867	62.25%	2,421	30.97%	530	6.78%
1984	5,000	63.46%	2,840	36.05%	39	0.49%
1988	4,137	56.85%	3,099	42.59%	41	0.56%
1992	3,076	36.42%	3,520	41.67%	1,851	21.91%
1996	3,265	44.05%	3,274	44.17%	873	11.78%
2000	4,619	55.09%	3,488	41.60%	278	3.32%
2004	5,392	62.80%	3,124	36.38%	70	0.82%
2008	4,991	55.34%	3,859	42.79%	168	1.86%
2012	5,413	61.92%	3,090	35.35%	239	2.73%
2016	5,634	62.19%	2,645	29.19%	781	8.62%
2020	6,248	63.43%	3,329	33.79%	274	2.78%
2024	6,104	63.94%	3,204	33.56%	238	2.49%

== See also ==
- National Register of Historic Places listings in Piatt County, Illinois
