= Windsor, Shelby County, Illinois =

Windsor, Illinois
- City
- Location of Windsor in Illinois
- Coordinates: 39°26′20″N 88°35′43″W
- Country: United States
- State: Illinois
- County: Shelby

Area
  - Total: 0.63 sq mi (1.63 km^{2})
  - Land: 0.63 sq mi (1.63 km^{2})
  - Water: 0 sq mi (0.00 km^{2})
- Elevation: 705 ft (215 m)

Population (2020)
  - Total: 1,079
  - Density: 1,712.6/sq mi (661.23/km^{2})
- Time zone: UTC-6 (CST)
  - Summer (DST): UTC-5 (CDT)
- ZIP code: 61957
- Area code: 217
- FIPS code: 17-82322
- GNIS feature ID: 2397341
- Website: windsorillinois.net

Windsor is a city in Shelby County, Illinois, United States. The population was 1,079 at the 2020 census.

== Geography ==
According to the US Census Bureau, the city has a total area of 0.630 square miles (1.63 km^{2}), all land.

=== Climate ===
Climate data for Windsor, Shelby County, Illinois (1991–2020 normals, extremes 1904–present)
Month	Jan	Feb	Mar	Apr	May	Jun	Jul	Aug	Sep	Oct	Nov	Dec	Year
Record high °F (°C)	74 (23)	75 (24)	89 (32)	90 (32)	97 (36)	105 (41)	111 (44)	107 (42)	106 (41)	95 (35)	84 (29)	72 (22)	111 (44)
Mean daily maximum °F (°C)	34.6 (1.4)	39.6 (4.2)	50.9 (10.5)	63.9 (17.7)	73.7 (23.2)	82.1 (27.8)	85.0 (29.4)	83.7 (28.7)	78.4 (25.8)	66.3 (19.1)	51.0 (10.6)	39.2 (4.0)	62.4 (16.9)
Daily mean °F (°C)	26.9 (−2.8)	31.2 (−0.4)	41.4 (5.2)	52.9 (11.6)	63.4 (17.4)	71.9 (22.2)	74.8 (23.8)	73.1 (22.8)	66.8 (19.3)	55.3 (12.9)	42.1 (5.6)	31.9 (−0.1)	52.6 (11.4)
Mean daily minimum °F (°C)	19.2 (−7.1)	22.8 (−5.1)	31.9 (−0.1)	41.9 (5.5)	53.1 (11.7)	61.6 (16.4)	64.7 (18.2)	62.5 (16.9)	55.2 (12.9)	44.3 (6.8)	33.2 (0.7)	24.7 (−4.1)	42.9 (6.1)
Record low °F (°C)	−26 (−32)	−24 (−31)	−7 (−22)	19 (−7)	27 (−3)	35 (2)	43 (6)	37 (3)	26 (−3)	16 (−9)	−6 (−21)	−20 (−29)	−26 (−32)
Average precipitation inches (mm)	2.64 (67)	1.97 (50)	3.11 (79)	4.51 (115)	4.57 (116)	4.76 (121)	3.91 (99)	2.95 (75)	2.97 (75)	3.60 (91)	3.75 (95)	2.45 (62)	41.19 (1,046)
Average snowfall inches (cm)	5.2 (13)	3.4 (8.6)	1.4 (3.6)	0.3 (0.76)	0.0 (0.0)	0.0 (0.0)	0.0 (0.0)	0.0 (0.0)	0.0 (0.0)	0.0 (0.0)	0.8 (2.0)	2.6 (6.6)	13.7 (35)
Average precipitation days (≥ 0.01 in)	8.6	7.2	9.4	10.7	12.8	10.1	8.4	7.7	7.0	7.8	9.3	8.0	107.0
Average snowy days (≥ 0.1 in)	3.1	1.9	0.8	0.2	0.0	0.0	0.0	0.0	0.0	0.0	0.6	2.0	8.6
Source: NOAA

== Demographics ==
Historical population
Census	Pop.	Note	%±
1870	518		—
1880	768		48.3%
1890	888		15.6%
1900	866		−2.5%
1910	987		14.0%
1920	1,000		1.3%
1930	927		−7.3%
1940	1,005		8.4%
1950	1,008		0.3%
1960	1,021		1.3%
1970	1,126		10.3%
1980	1,228		9.1%
1990	1,143		−6.9%
2000	1,125		−1.6%
2010	1,187		5.5%
2020	1,079		−9.1%
U.S. Decennial Census

As of the census of 2000, there were 1,125 people, 466 households, and 317 families residing in the city. The population density was 1,820.3 inhabitants per square mile (702.8/km^{2}). There were 523 housing units at an average density of 846.2 per square mile (326.7/km^{2}). The racial makeup of the city was 98.84% White, 0.36% from other races, and 0.80% from two or more races. Hispanic or Latino of any race were 0.44% of the population.

There were 466 households, out of which 32.0% had children under the age of 18 living with them, 54.7% were married couples living together, 10.3% had a female householder with no husband present, and 31.8% were non-families. 27.9% of all households were made up of individuals, and 15.0% had someone living alone who was 65 years of age or older. The average household size was 2.41 and the average family size was 2.93.

In the city, the population was spread out, with 26.2% under the age of 18, 8.5% from 18 to 24, 26.7% from 25 to 44, 21.4% from 45 to 64, and 17.2% who were 65 years of age or older. The median age was 38 years. For every 100 females, there were 88.4 males. For every 100 females age 18 and over, there were 85.7 males.

The median income for a household in the city was $33,095, and the median income for a family was $40,250. Males had a median income of $27,100 versus $20,000 for females. The per capita income for the city was $16,002. About 6.5% of families and 8.4% of the population were below the poverty line, including 11.5% of those under age 18 and 9.9% of those age 65 or over.
