= Cisco, Illinois =

Cisco
- Village
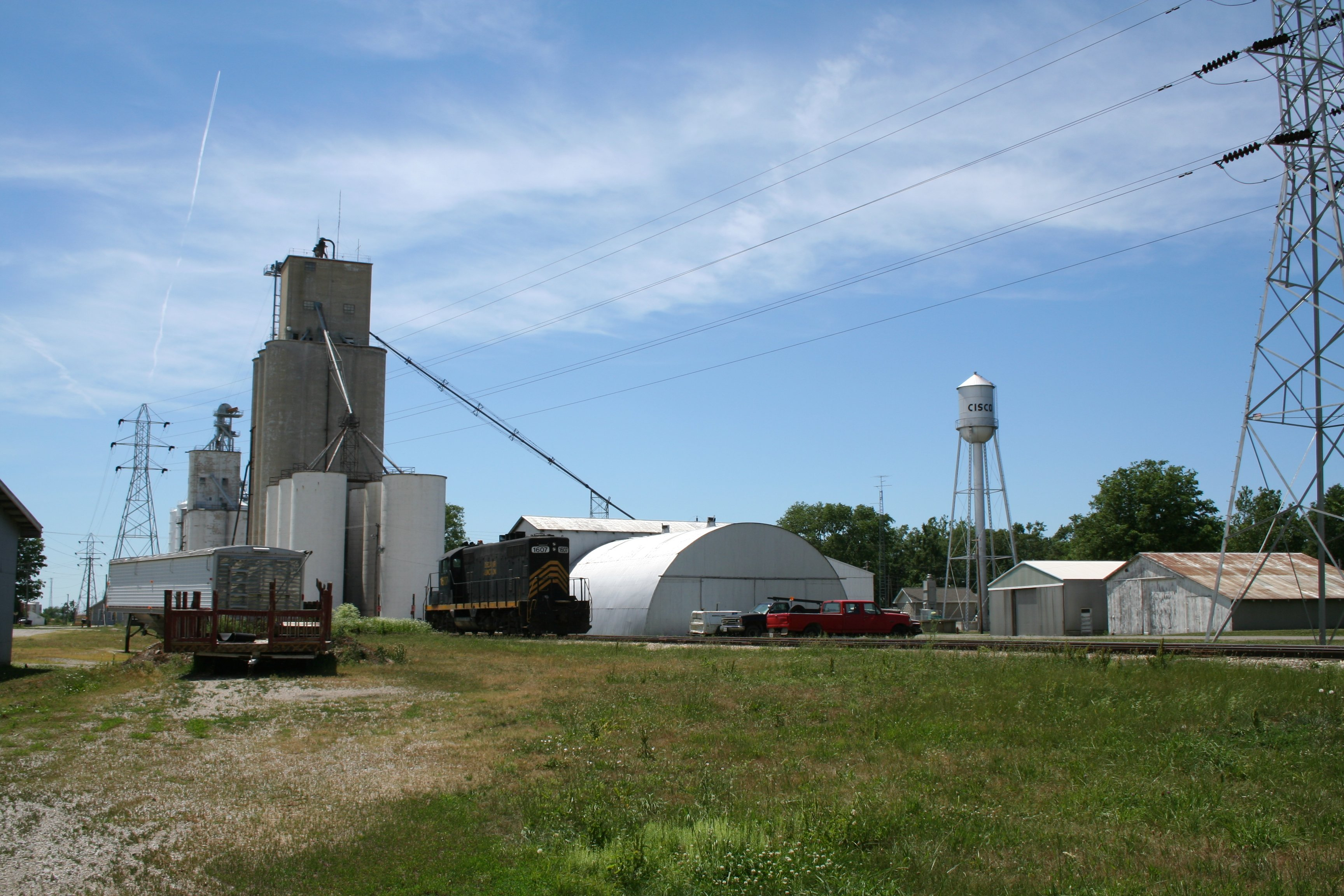
- Cisco grain elevator and water tower, 2007

- Location of Cisco in Piatt County, Illinois.
- Coordinates: 40°00′42″N 88°43′32″W
- Country: United States
- State: Illinois
- County: Piatt
- Township: Willow Branch

Area
  - Total: 0.18 sq mi (0.47 km^{2})
  - Land: 0.18 sq mi (0.47 km^{2})
  - Water: 0 sq mi (0.00 km^{2})
- Elevation: 689 ft (210 m)

Population (2020)
  - Total: 254
  - Density: 1,396.1/sq mi (539.05/km^{2})
- Time zone: UTC-6 (CST)
  - Summer (DST): UTC-5 (CDT)
- ZIP code: 61830
- Area code: 217
- FIPS code: 17-14442
- GNIS ID: 2397625

Cisco is a village in Piatt County, Illinois, United States. As of the 2020 census, Cisco had a population of 254.

== Geography ==
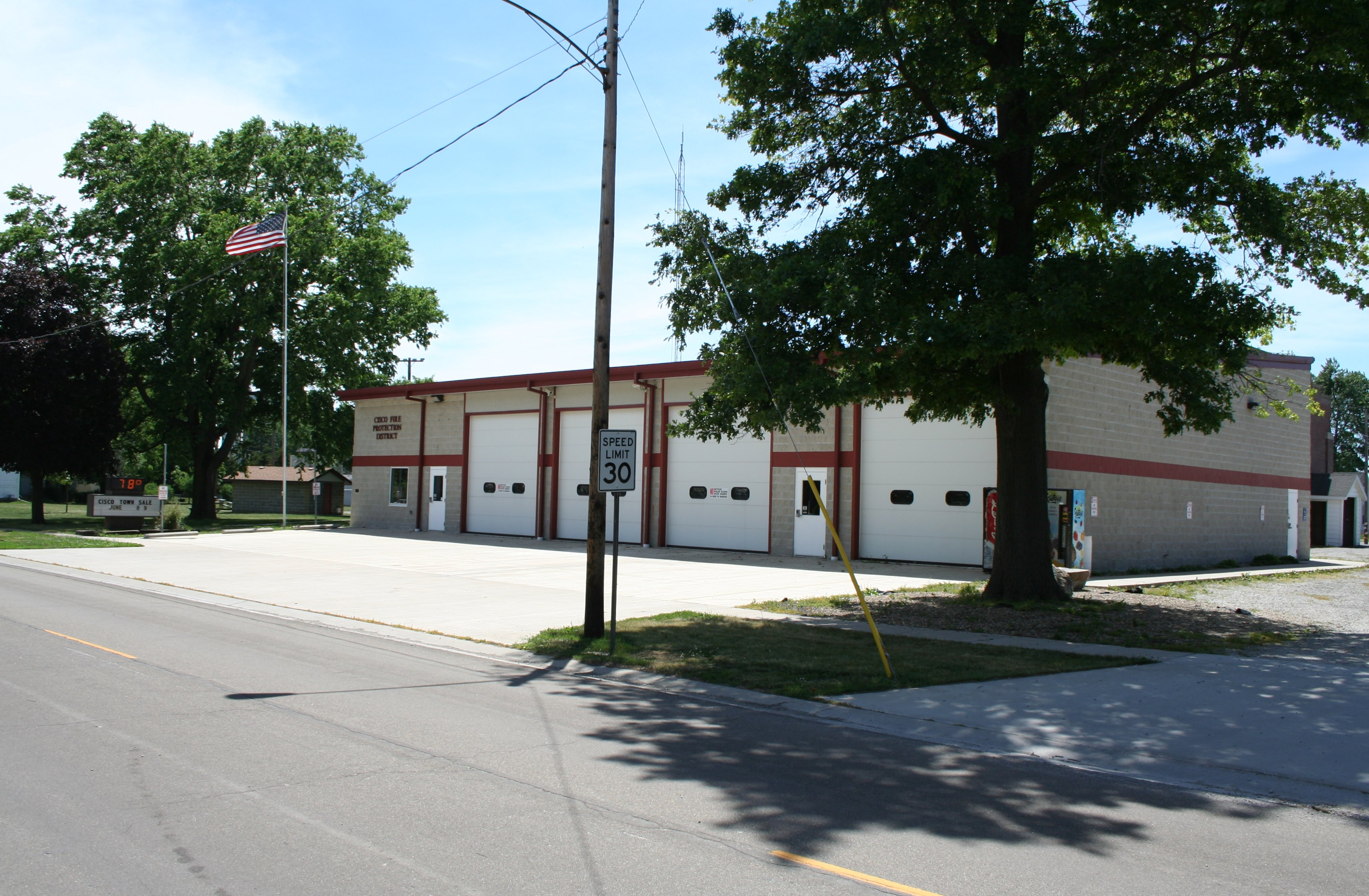
Cisco Fire Station, 2007

According to the 2010 census, Cisco has a total area of 0.37 square miles (0.96 km^{2}), all land.

== Demographics ==
Historical population
Census	Pop.	Note	%±
1880	173		—
1900	369		—
1910	379		2.7%
1920	345		−9.0%
1930	353		2.3%
1940	357		1.1%
1950	334		−6.4%
1960	398		19.2%
1970	358		−10.1%
1980	333		−7.0%
1990	282		−15.3%
2000	264		−6.4%
2010	261		−1.1%
2020	254		−2.7%
U.S. Decennial Census

There were 109 households, out of which 28.4% had children under the age of 18 living with them, 72.5% were married couples living together, 5.5% had a female householder with no husband present, and 21.1% were non-families. 20.2% of all households were made up of individuals, and 7.3% had someone living alone who was 65 years of age or older. The average household size was 2.42 and the average family size was 2.78.

In the village, the population was spread out, with 20.8% under the age of 18, 6.8% from 18 to 24, 27.3% from 25 to 44, 25.8% from 45 to 64, and 19.3% who were 65 years of age or older. The median age was 40 years. For every 100 females, there were 92.7 males. For every 100 females age 18 and over, there were 93.5 males.

The median income for a household in the village was $40,625, and the median income for a family was $43,750. Males had a median income of $35,625 versus $18,125 for females. The per capita income for the village was $17,722. About 7.0% of families and 8.3% of the population were below the poverty line, including 16.0% of those under the age of 18 and 4.2% of those 65 or over.

== See also ==
- List of municipalities in Illinois
