= Monticello, Illinois =

- City
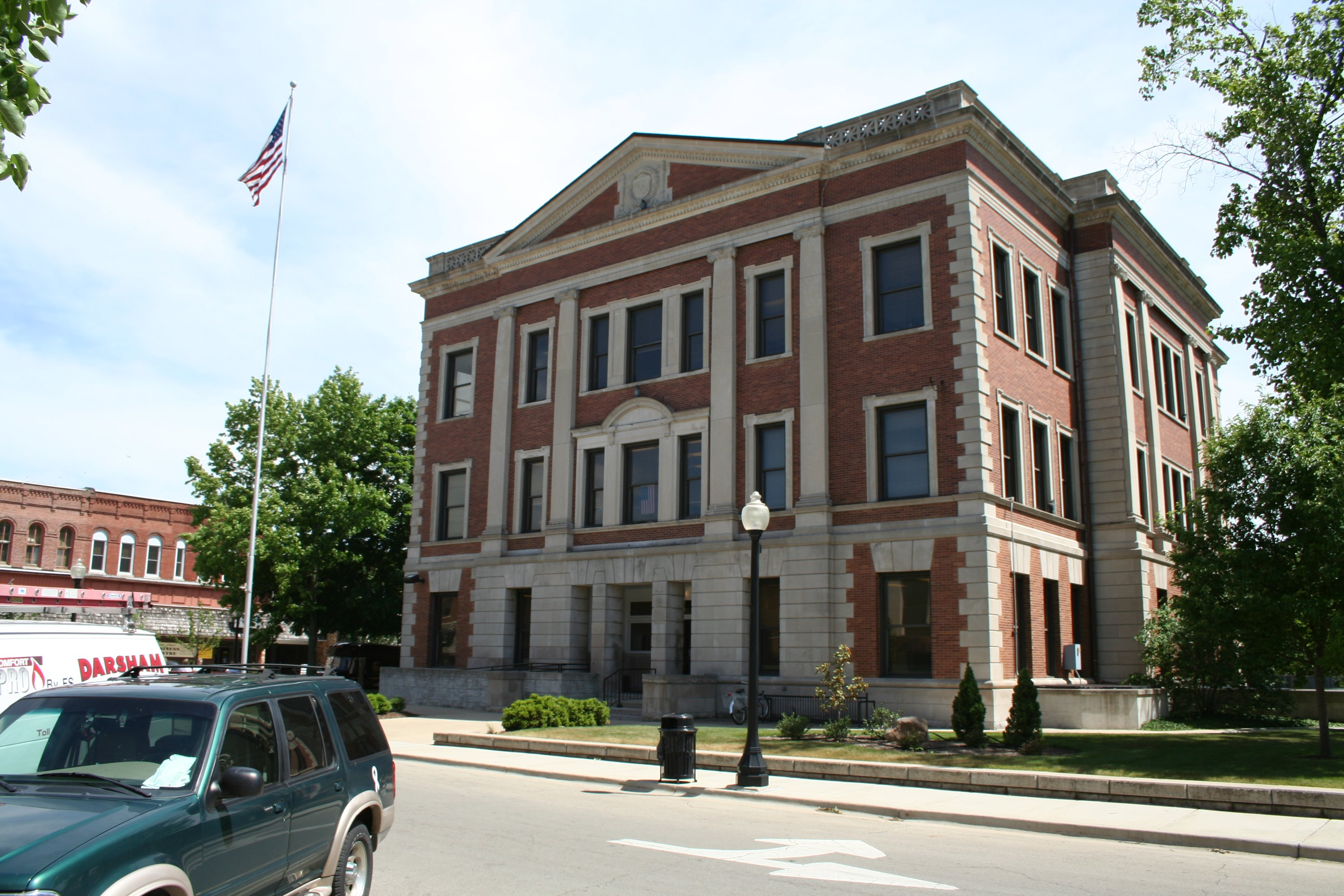
- Piatt County Courthouse
- Motto(s): "Yesterday's Charm, Tomorrow's Innovation"
- Interactive map of Monticello, Illinois
- Location within Illinois Location within the United States
- Coordinates: 40°02′03″N 88°34′22″W
- Country: United States
- State: Illinois
- County: Piatt
- Townships: Monticello, Sangamon

Area
  - Total: 3.89 sq mi (10.08 km^{2})
  - Land: 3.85 sq mi (9.98 km^{2})
  - Water: 0.039 sq mi (0.10 km^{2})
- Elevation: 656 ft (200 m)

Population (2020)
  - Total: 5,941
  - Density: 1,542/sq mi (595.5/km^{2})
- Time zone: UTC-6 (CST)
  - Summer (DST): UTC-5 (CDT)
- ZIP code: 61856
- Area code(s): 217, 447
- FIPS code: 17-50244
- GNIS ID: 2395384
- Website: www.monticelloillinois.net

Monticello (/ˌmɒntɪˈsɛloʊ/ MON-tiss-EL-oh) is a city in and the county seat of Piatt County, Illinois, United States. The population was 5,941 at the 2020 census.

== History ==
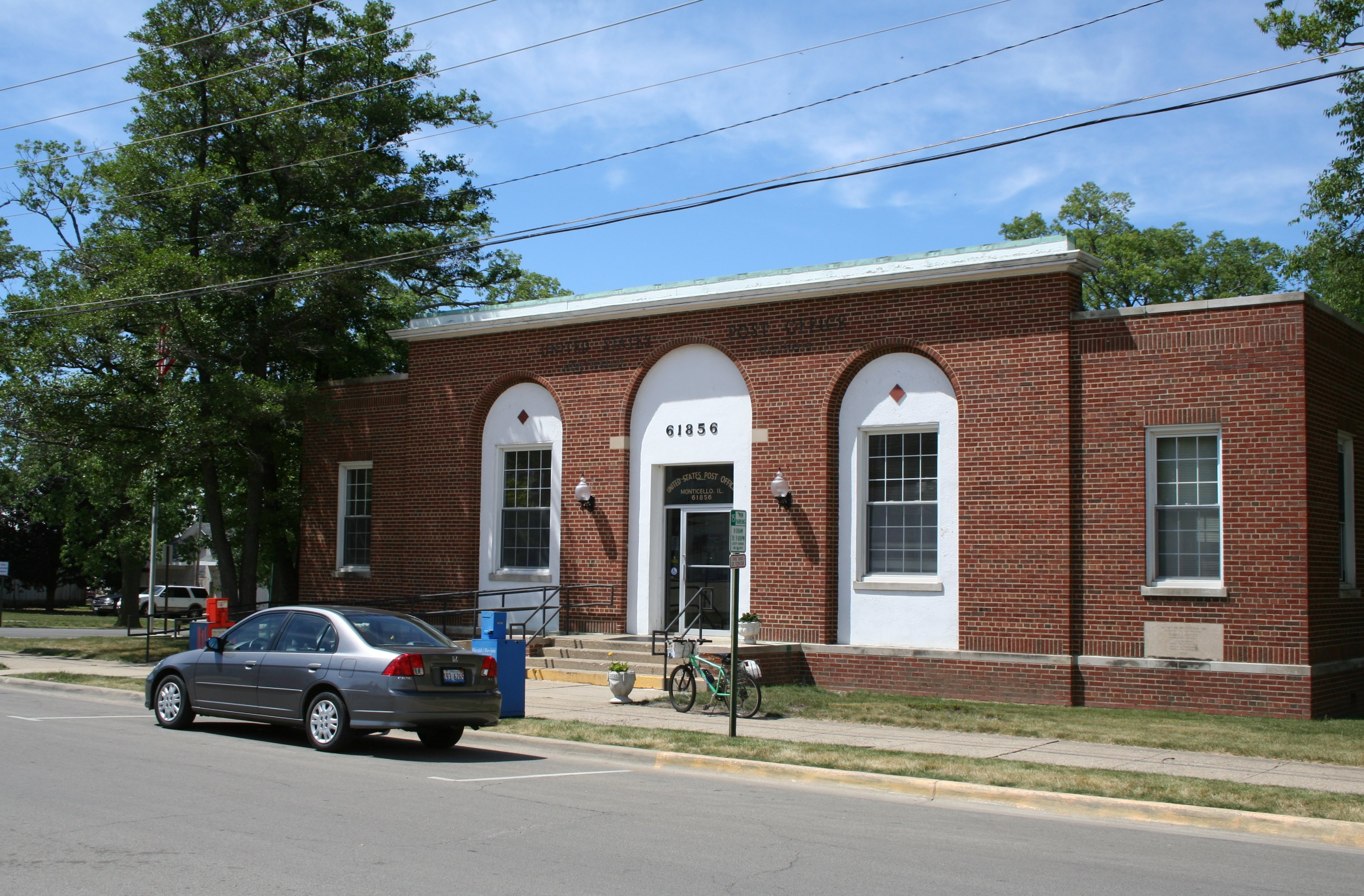
Monticello Post Office

Monticello's first non-native resident was George Hayworth. Hayworth came to the area in 1822 to serve as a U.S. liaison agent to local Native American tribes. Hayworth did not remain, but in 1829, James A. Piatt purchased Hayworth's small log cabin. Soon more settlers arrived.

In 1837, residents decided to form a new town. Abraham Marquiss, William Barnes, James McReynolds, and James A. Piatt Jr. formed a joint stock company and purchased land from James A. Piatt. Upon McReynolds' suggestion, the town was christened Monticello – after the home of Thomas Jefferson. Monticello officially became a town on July 1, 1837. Townsfolk held a celebration on July 4.

The first house in the new town was built by a Mr. Cass who used the building as his home and a grocery store. The second house was a log cabin built by John Tenbrooke. In 1839, Nicholas DeVore built the "Old Fort" which was later used as a hotel. Monticello continued to grow as the population increased over the next decade.

George Patterson and other prominent citizens of the area were unhappy with the travel distance to the county seat to conduct legal business, and petitioned to establish a new county. At the time, Monticello was part of Macon County, whose seat is in Decatur, nearly 30 miles away. The northern part of present-day Piatt County was part of DeWitt County whose seat is at Clinton. The Illinois General Assembly established a new county on January 27, 1841. By coin toss, the county was named Piatt County, in honor of the first permanent settler, James A. Piatt. As Monticello was the only town in the new county at the time, it was named the county seat. The government of the new county began conducting business on April 5, 1841, in the "Old Fort." In 1843, the first courthouse was built on land donated by William H. Piatt. The second courthouse was built in 1856, and the present courthouse was completed in 1904.

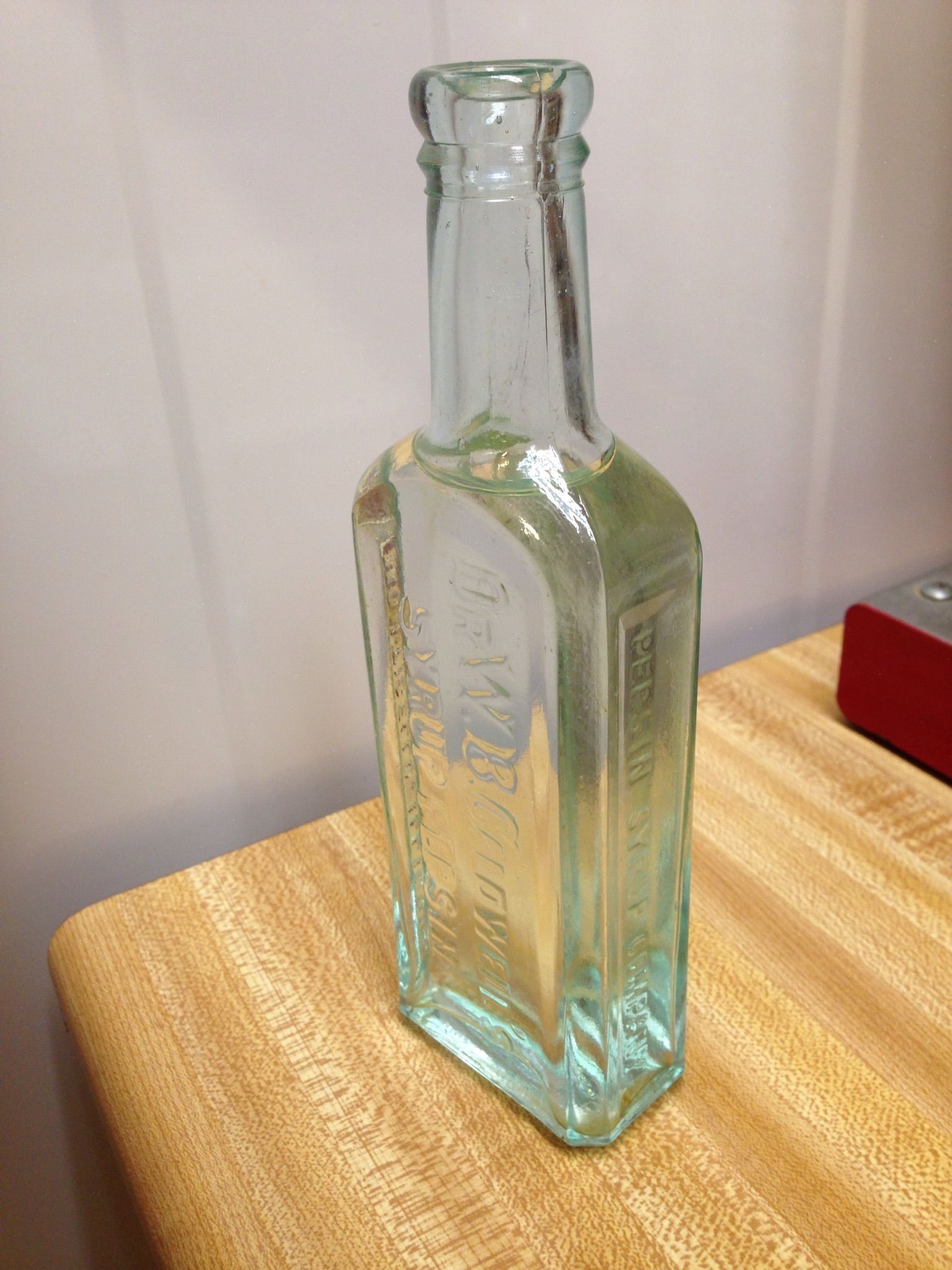
Bottle of the Syrup Pepsin Company. It reads Monticello, Illinois on the left side.

Monticello's star resident arrived in 1885. Dr. William B. Caldwell came to practice medicine in Monticello but his homemade mixture of senna and pepsin brought Monticello to a level of national prominence. The Pepsin Syrup Company was founded in 1893, and became the leading employer in the city for decades until its closure in 1985. The building in which it operated has since been demolished. The site is now used as an unofficial soccer practice field.

In 1987 the 150th birthday of the town was celebrated with an open air reenactment and other festivities.

The Potawatomi Trail of Death passed through the town in 1838.

In a 2012 episode of the Comedy Central program The Daily Show, host Jon Stewart used the town in a joke segment, referring to it as Dogshit Bluffs.

== Geography ==
According to the 2010 census, Monticello has a total area of 3.829 square miles (9.92 km^{2}), of which 3.8 square miles (9.84 km^{2}) (or 99.24%) is land and 0.029 square miles (0.08 km^{2}) (or 0.76%) is water.

Monticello is located in East Central Illinois between the cities of Decatur and Champaign, Illinois.

=== Landmarks ===
Robert Allerton Park, which belongs to the University of Illinois at Urbana–Champaign and includes 1,500 acres of woodland and prairie areas, a meadow, a conference and retreat center, formal sculpture gardens, hiking trails, lodging facilities, a summer camp location, and a Georgian style mansion, is located just outside Monticello, to the southwest. The Allerton Natural Area within the park was designated a National Natural Landmark in 1970.

Monticello Railway Museum is located on the north side of Monticello. The Monticello Railway Museum is a non-profit operating railroad that offers train rides to the public from May to October.

== Demographics ==
Historical population
Census	Pop.	Note	%±
1850	163		—
1860	577		254.0%
1870	871		51.0%
1880	1,337		53.5%
1890	1,643		22.9%
1900	1,982		20.6%
1910	1,981		−0.1%
1920	2,280		15.1%
1930	2,378		4.3%
1940	2,523		6.1%
1950	2,612		3.5%
1960	3,219		23.2%
1970	4,130		28.3%
1980	4,753		15.1%
1990	4,549		−4.3%
2000	5,138		12.9%
2010	5,548		8.0%
2020	5,941		7.1%
U.S. Decennial Census

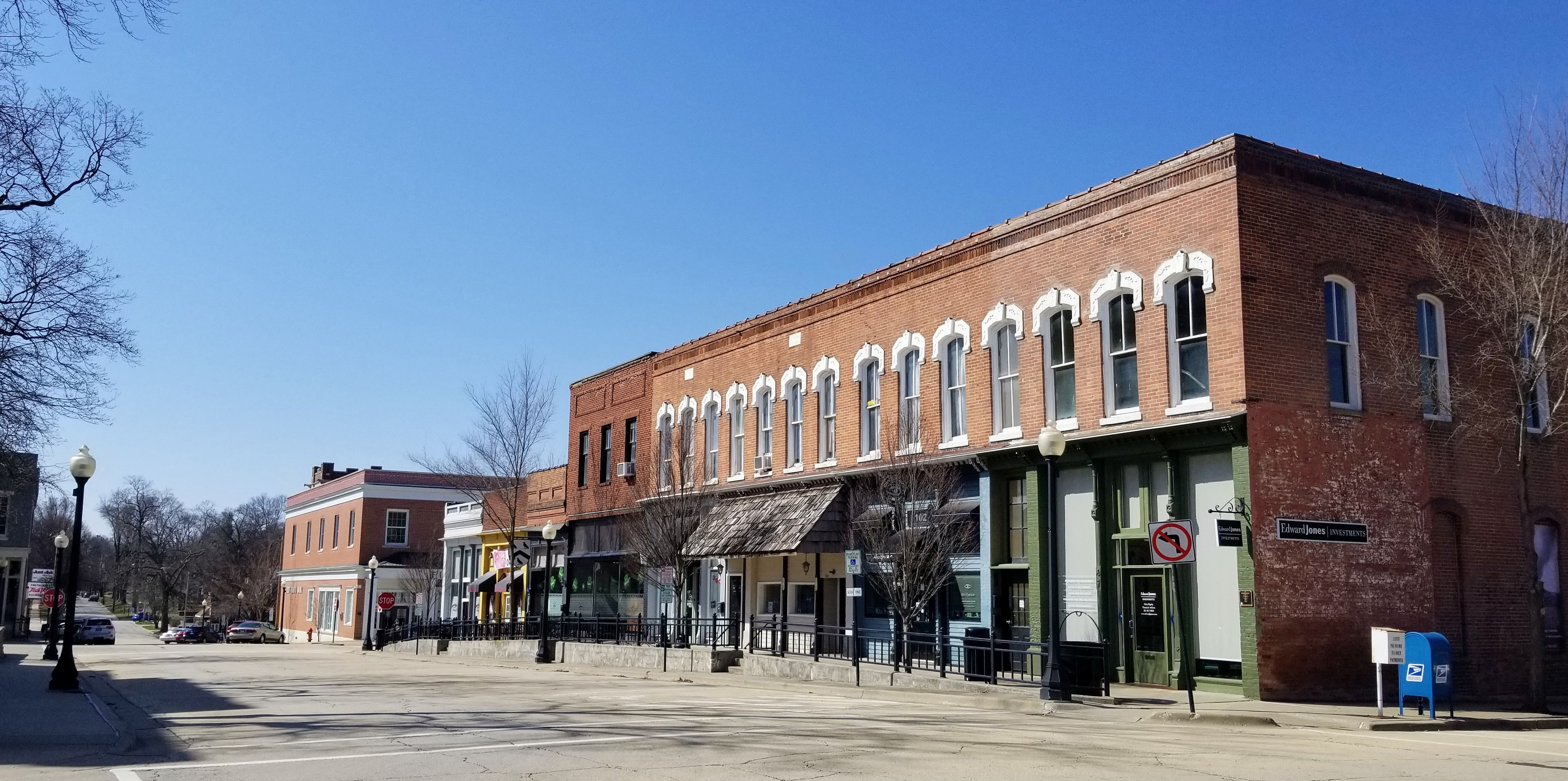
Buildings on Charter Street

=== 2020 census ===
As of the 2020 census, Monticello had a population of 5,941. The median age was 43.3 years. 23.0% of residents were under the age of 18 and 23.8% of residents were 65 years of age or older. For every 100 females there were 89.2 males, and for every 100 females age 18 and over there were 87.0 males age 18 and over.

99.4% of residents lived in urban areas, while 0.6% lived in rural areas.

There were 2,414 households in Monticello, of which 31.0% had children under the age of 18 living in them. Of all households, 55.2% were married-couple households, 13.7% were households with a male householder and no spouse or partner present, and 26.1% were households with a female householder and no spouse or partner present. About 27.6% of all households were made up of individuals and 16.1% had someone living alone who was 65 years of age or older.

There were 2,591 housing units, of which 6.8% were vacant. The homeowner vacancy rate was 2.5% and the rental vacancy rate was 9.8%.

Racial composition as of the 2020 census
Race	Number	Percent
White	5,575	93.8%
Black or African American	43	0.7%
American Indian and Alaska Native	6	0.1%
Asian	48	0.8%
Native Hawaiian and Other Pacific Islander	0	0.0%
Some other race	24	0.4%
Two or more races	245	4.1%
Hispanic or Latino (of any race)	79	1.3%

=== 2000 census ===
As of the 2000 census, there were 5,138 people, 2,146 households, and 1,446 families residing in the city. The population density was 1,724.7 inhabitants per square mile (665.9/km^{2}). There were 2,226 housing units at an average density of 747.2 per square mile (288.5/km^{2}). The racial makeup of the city was 99.01% White, 0.08% African American, 0.14% Native American, 0.14% Asian, 0.02% Pacific Islander, 0.08% from other races, and 0.54% from two or more races. Hispanic or Latino of any race were 0.80% of the population.

There were 2,146 households, out of which 29.2% had children under the age of 18 living with them, 58.4% were married couples living together, 6.8% had a female householder with no husband present, and 32.6% were non-families. 29.7% of all households were made up of individuals, and 16.6% had someone living alone who was 65 years of age or older. The average household size was 2.34 and the average family size was 2.91. Also home to Kirby Hospital. In the city, the population was spread out, with 23.4% under the age of 18, 6.1% from 18 to 24, 26.4% from 25 to 44, 24.3% from 45 to 64, and 19.9% who were 65 years of age or older. The median age was 42 years. For every 100 females, there were 88.9 males. For every 100 females age 18 and over, there were 83.2 males.

The median income for a household in the city was $45,754, and the median income for a family was $57,287. Males had a median income of $41,074 versus $24,130 for females. The per capita income for the city was $23,257. About 2.3% of families and 3.8% of the population were below the poverty line, including 1.6% of those under age 18 and 7.5% of those age 65 or over.

== Notable people ==
- Robert Allerton, art collector and philanthropist
- Robert C. Burke, United States Marine who posthumously received Medal of Honor for heroism in Vietnam in 1968
- Harry Combes, basketball player and head coach at the University of Illinois
- Rolla C. McMillen, former U.S. Representative
- Allen F. Moore, former U.S. Representative
- James P. Ownby Illinois state representative; lived in Monticello
- Andrew Peterson, Contemporary Christian music artist
- Rolland F. Tipsword, Illinois state representative and judge

== See also ==
- King Family Band
