= Voorhees (surname) =

Voorhees is a Dutch surname. Notable people with the name include:

- Alan Voorhees (1922–2005), American transportation engineer
- Andrew Vorhees (born 1999), American football player
- Charles Stewart Voorhees (1853–1909), American lawyer and politician
- Clark Voorhees (1871–1933), American landscape painter
- Daniel Voorhees (disambiguation), multiple people, including:
  - Daniel W. Voorhees (1827–1897), American lawyer and politician from Indiana
  - Daniel S. Voorhees (1914–1953), confessed to the 1947 murder of Elizabeth Short
  - Daniel Spader Voorhees (1852–1935), American politician from New Jersey
- David Voorhees, American geologist
- Debi Sue Voorhees (born 1961), American actress
- Donald Voorhees (disambiguation), multiple people, including:
  - Donald Voorhees (conductor) (1903–1989), American composer and conductor
  - Donald E. Voorhees (1930–2001), American politician from Iowa
  - Donald S. Voorhees (1916–1989), American judge
- Ellen Voorhees (born 1958), American computer scientist
- Erik Voorhees (born 1985), American entrepreneur
- Foster McGowan Voorhees (1856–1927), American politician, governor of New Jersey
- Lark Voorhies (born 1974), American actress
- Lida Voorhees (1864–1934), American tennis player
- Richard Lesley Voorhees (born 1941), American judge
- Steven C. Voorhees (born c. 1955), American business executive
- Steven van Voorhees (1600–1684), Dutch colonial magistrate, founder of a Dutch Reformed Church
- Tracy Voorhees (1890–1974), American Under Secretary of the U.S. Army
- Vern Voorhees (1878–1934), American politician from Michigan

== Fictional characters ==
- Jason Voorhees, the central antagonist of the Friday the 13th franchise
- Pamela Voorhees, Jason's mother in the Friday the 13th franchise
- Klaus Voorhees, Marvel Comics supervillain
- Curtis Vorhees, from The Passage
- Jacqueline Voorhees, from Unbreakable Kimmy Schmidt
- Megan Voorhees, a minor character in Scary Movie 2
- Nitia Vorhees, from The Passage
- Xanthippe Lannister Voorhees, from Unbreakable Kimmy Schmidt
- Dr. Voorhees in The Thing from Another World

== See also ==
- Voorhies (disambiguation)
- Voris
- Voorheis
- Voorhis
