= Voorhees =

Voorhees may refer to:

== Places ==
- Voorhees Township, Kansas, located in Stevens County, Kansas
- Voorhees Township, New Jersey
- Voorhees (CDP), New Jersey, located in Somerset County
- Voorhees Mall, a section of Rutgers University's College Avenue Campus in New Brunswick
- Voorhees State Park, New Jersey

== Buildings and institutions ==
- Voorhees Chapel, the college chapel at Jamestown College in Jamestown, North Dakota
- Voorhees Chapel (Rutgers), a college chapel on Rutgers University's Douglass Residential College campus in New Brunswick, New Jersey
- Voorhees Hall, a building on Rutgers University's College Avenue Campus in New Brunswick, New Jersey
- Voorhees Town Center, a regional shopping mall and planned residential area in Voorhees Township, New Jersey
- Voorhees High School, Lebanon Township, New Jersey
- Voorhees College, Denmark, South Carolina

== People ==
- Voorhees (surname), includes a list of real and fictional people with the name

== Other uses ==
- Voorhees (band), a hardcore punk band from Durham, England
- "Voorhees", a song from the album Frames by Oceansize
- Voorhees, Gmelin and Walker, New York architectural firm

== See also ==
- Voorhies (disambiguation)
- Voorheis
- Voorhis
