= Van Voorhis =

Van Voorhis may refer to:

== Places in the United States ==
- Van Voorhis, Pennsylvania, a census-designated place
- Van Voorhis, West Virginia, an unincorporated community

== People ==
- Bruce Van Voorhis (1908–1943), United States Navy aviator posthumously awarded the Medal of Honor
- Daniel Van Voorhis (1878–1956), United States Army lieutenant general, son of H. Clay Van Voorhis
- H. Clay Van Voorhis (1852–1927), American lawyer and politician
- Haley Van Voorhis (born 2003 or 2004), American former college football player, one of the first women to play a position other than kicker in an NCAA football game
- John Van Voorhis (1826–1905), American lawyer and politician
- John Van Voorhis (judge) (1897–1983), American judge, lawyer and politician, grandson of the above
- Troy Van Voorhis (born 1976), American chemist
- Westbrook Van Voorhis (1903–1968), American television and film narrator

== Other uses ==
- USS Van Voorhis, a destroyer escort named after Bruce Van Voorhis
