= VFC-13 =

Fighter Squadron Composite 13
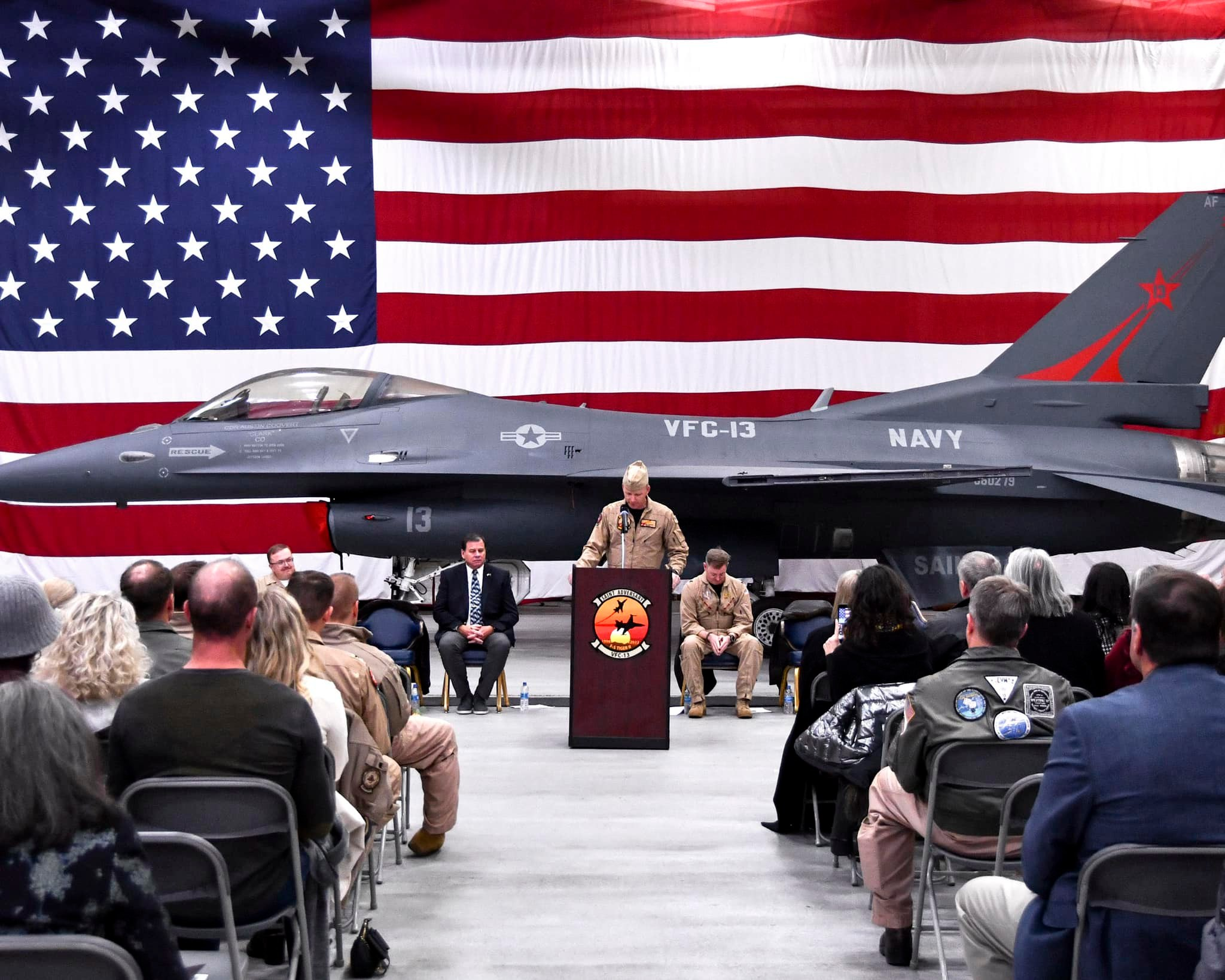
- A squadron F-16C Fighting Falcon during a ceremony at NAS Fallon in 2022
- Active: 1 September 1973 – present
- Country: United States
- Branch: United States Navy
- Type: Adversary Squadron
- Part of: United States Navy Reserve: Naval Air Force Reserve; Tactical Support Wing
- Garrison/HQ: Naval Air Station Fallon, Nevada
- Nickname: "Fighting Saints"

Insignia
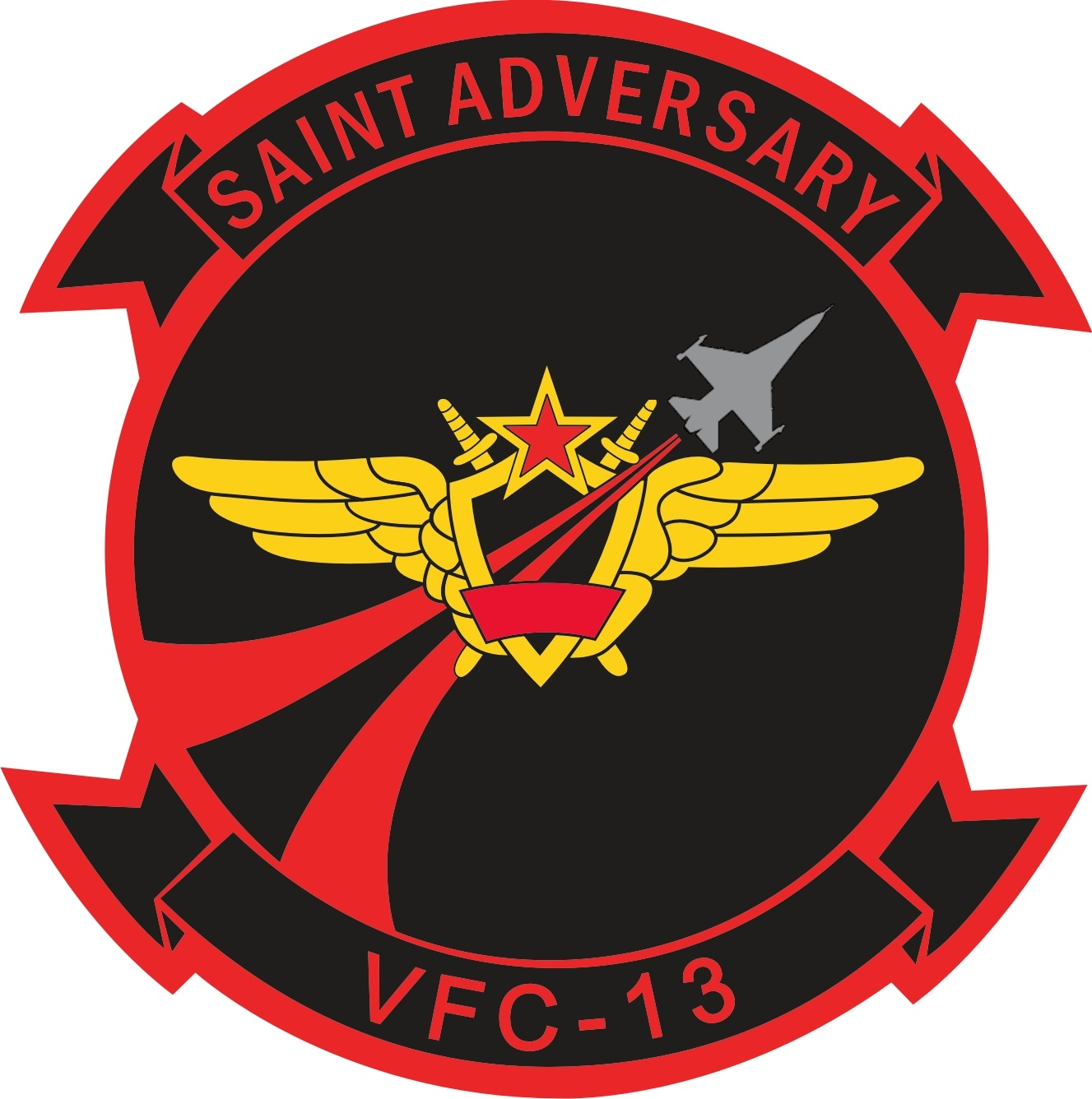
- Squadron insignia

Aircraft flown
- Fighter: F-8 Crusader (1973–1974); A-4 Skyhawk (1974–1993); F/A-18 Hornet (1993–1996); F-5 Tiger II (1996–2022); F-16C Fighting Falcon (2022–present)

Fighter Squadron Composite 13 (VFC-13), also known as the "Fighting Saints", is a fighter squadron of the United States Navy Reserve that provides adversary training at NAS Fallon, Nevada. VFC-13 uses "Bogey" as its main radio callsign.

== Mission ==
VFC-13 provides adversary training for Navy and Marine Corps Active and Reserve fleet and replacement squadrons, carrier air wings and Marine aircraft groups, USAF units, to include Air Force Reserve and Air National Guard, and Canadian Forces. The squadron has received two consecutive CNO Safety Awards, the Golden Wrench Maintenance Award, and in 1994 and 2011, the Battle "E" award.

== History ==
=== 1970s ===
The squadron was established as Fleet Composite Squadron Thirteen (VC-13) on 1 September 1973 at NAS New Orleans, Louisiana when the US Navy reorganized the US Naval Reserve and the Naval Air Reserve Force (NAVAIRESFOR). The squadron first flew the F-8 Crusader, and had 17 officers and 127 enlisted men within its ranks, most were former members of VSF-76 and VSF-86. In April 1974, they made the transition to the A-4 Skyhawk. The demand for West Coast adversary squadrons and other fleet support missions resulted in the squadron relocating to NAS Miramar, California in February 1976. In mid-1976, VC-13 added the two seat TA-4J to the single seat A-4L in their aircraft complement.

=== 1980s ===
In 1983, the squadron returned to single-seat aircraft and transitioned to the A-4E.

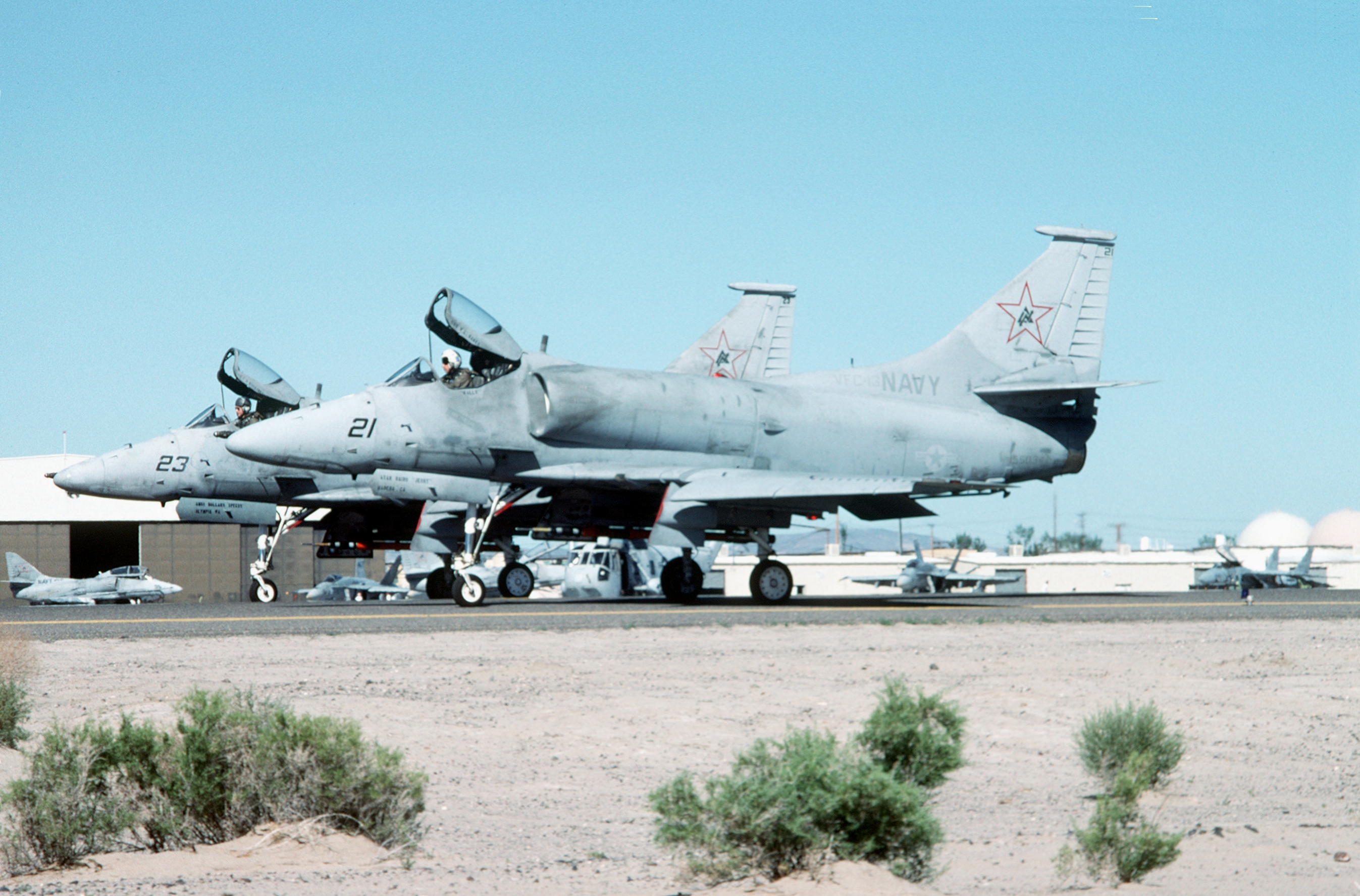
VFC-13 A-4Fs at NAS Fallon in June 1993

On 22 April 1988, the squadron was re-designated Fighter Composite Squadron Thirteen (VFC-13). The same year, the squadron started operating A-4F "Super Fox" variant of the A-4.

=== 1990s ===
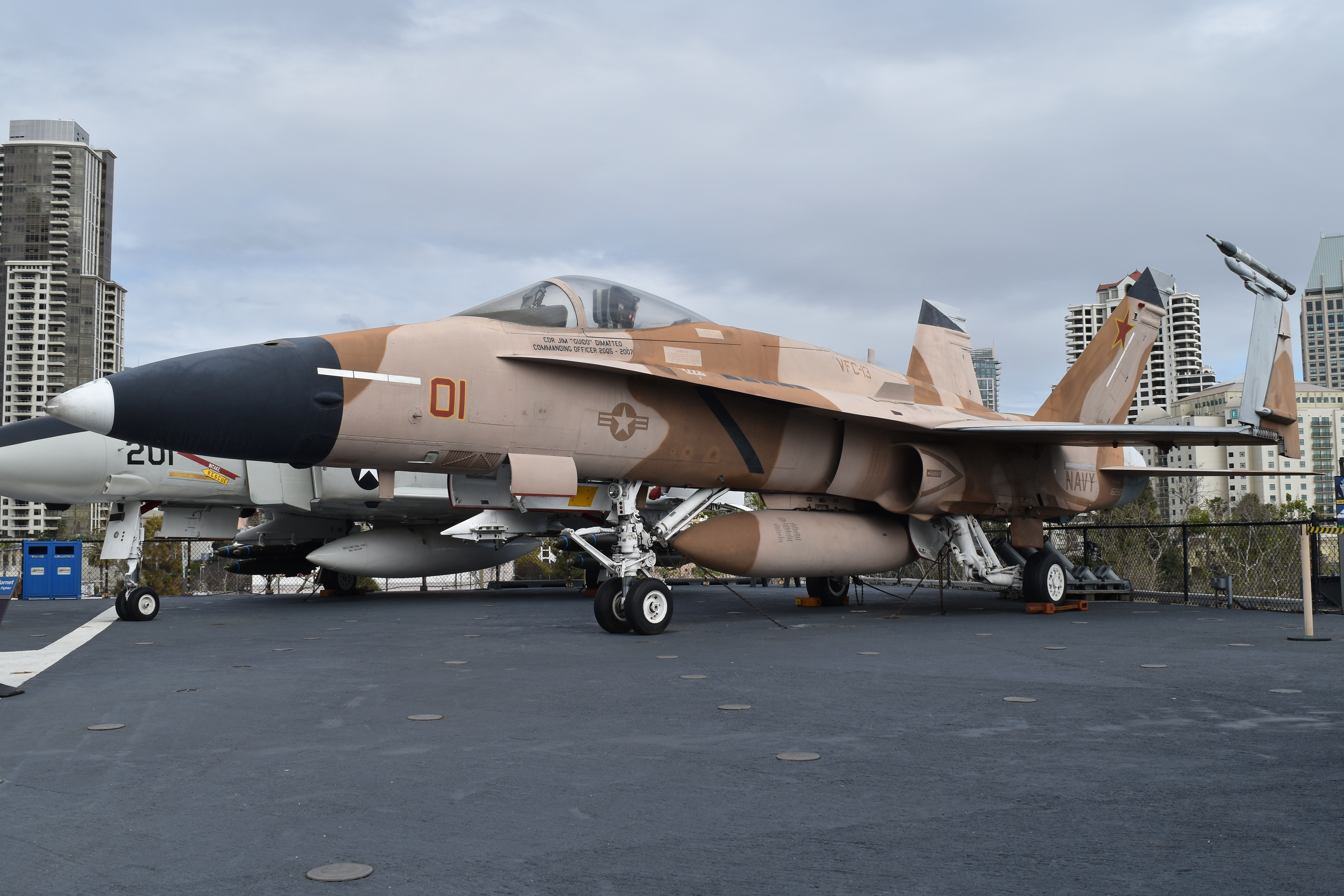
A preserved F/A-18A in VFC-13 squadron colors on the deck of the USS Midway Museum in San Diego, California, 2018

On 26 August 1993, the last A-4 left the squadron. Starting in September, the squadron transitioned to the F/A-18 Hornet.

In April 1996, VFC-13 transferred to NAS Fallon and made the transition to the F-5E Tiger II. It took over the adversary mission from VF-45 and VFA-127.

=== 2010s ===
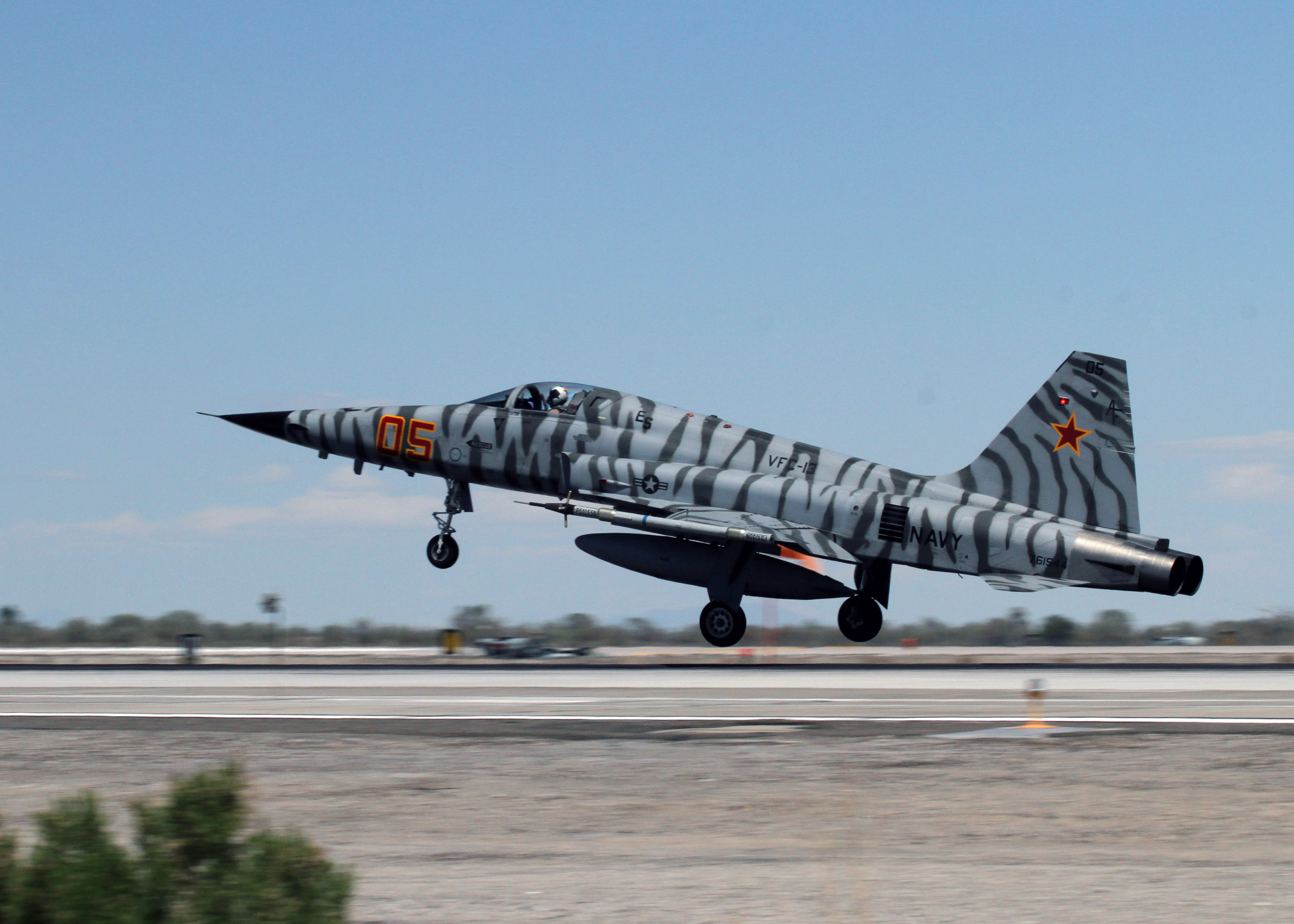
A squadron F-5N Tiger II lands at NAS Fallon in 2015

In 2011, the squadron received their second Battle "E" Efficiency Award.

=== 2020s ===
In April 2022, plans to replace VFC-13's F-5s with Block 32 F-16 Fighting Falcons which are being retired from USAF service became public. The squadron's F-5s will be transferred to VFA-204, a US Navy adversary squadron currently operating F/A-18 Hornets. VFA-204, based at Naval Air Station Joint Reserve Base New Orleans, is scheduled to retire its aging fleet of Hornets and will be redesignated VFC-204 by October 2022.

As of December 2022 the squadron has transitioned to the F-16C.

== See also ==
- History of the United States Navy
- List of United States Navy aircraft squadrons
- List of inactive United States Navy aircraft squadrons
