= Voris =

Voris is a Dutch surname, derived from Voorhees (surname). Notable people with the surname include:

- Alvin C. Voris (1827–1904), American politician and military officer from Ohio
- Dick Voris, American football player and coach
- Jeff Voris, American football coach
- Michael Voris (born 1961), American Roman Catholic activist and apologist
- Roy Marlin Voris (1919–2005), American aviator and World War II flying ace
- Zoe Voris (born 1998), American wheelchair basketball player

== See also ==
- Voris Marker (1908–1973), American fashion designer and sculptor.
- Voorhees (disambiguation)
