= Robert Reimann =

Robert Reimann may refer to:

- Robert Reimann (United States Navy officer) (born c. 1936), U.S. Navy rear admiral
- Robert Reimann (politician) (1911–1987), Swiss politician and President of the Council of States 1977/78
