= Voorhies =

Voorhies may refer to:

== People ==
- Albert Voorhies (1829–1913), Lieutenant Governor of Louisiana
- Amos E. Voorhies (1869–1960), American newspaper publisher
- Lark Voorhies (born 1974), American actress
- Paul W. Voorhies (1875–1952), American lawyer, prosecutor, and Michigan Attorney General
- Voorhies Trahan (1897–1963), American crawfish farming pioneer

== Places ==
- Voorhies, Illinois, unincorporated community in Unity Township, Piatt County, Illinois, United States
- Voorhies, Iowa, unincorporated community in Lincoln Township, Black Hawk County, Iowa, United States
- D. W. Voorhies House, house located in St. Martinville, Louisiana
- Voorhies Castle, Victorian home located in Voorhies, Illinois

== See also ==
- Voorhees (disambiguation)
- Voorheis (surname)
- Voorhis (surname)
- Justice Voorhies (disambiguation)
