= Robert Reimann (United States Navy officer) =

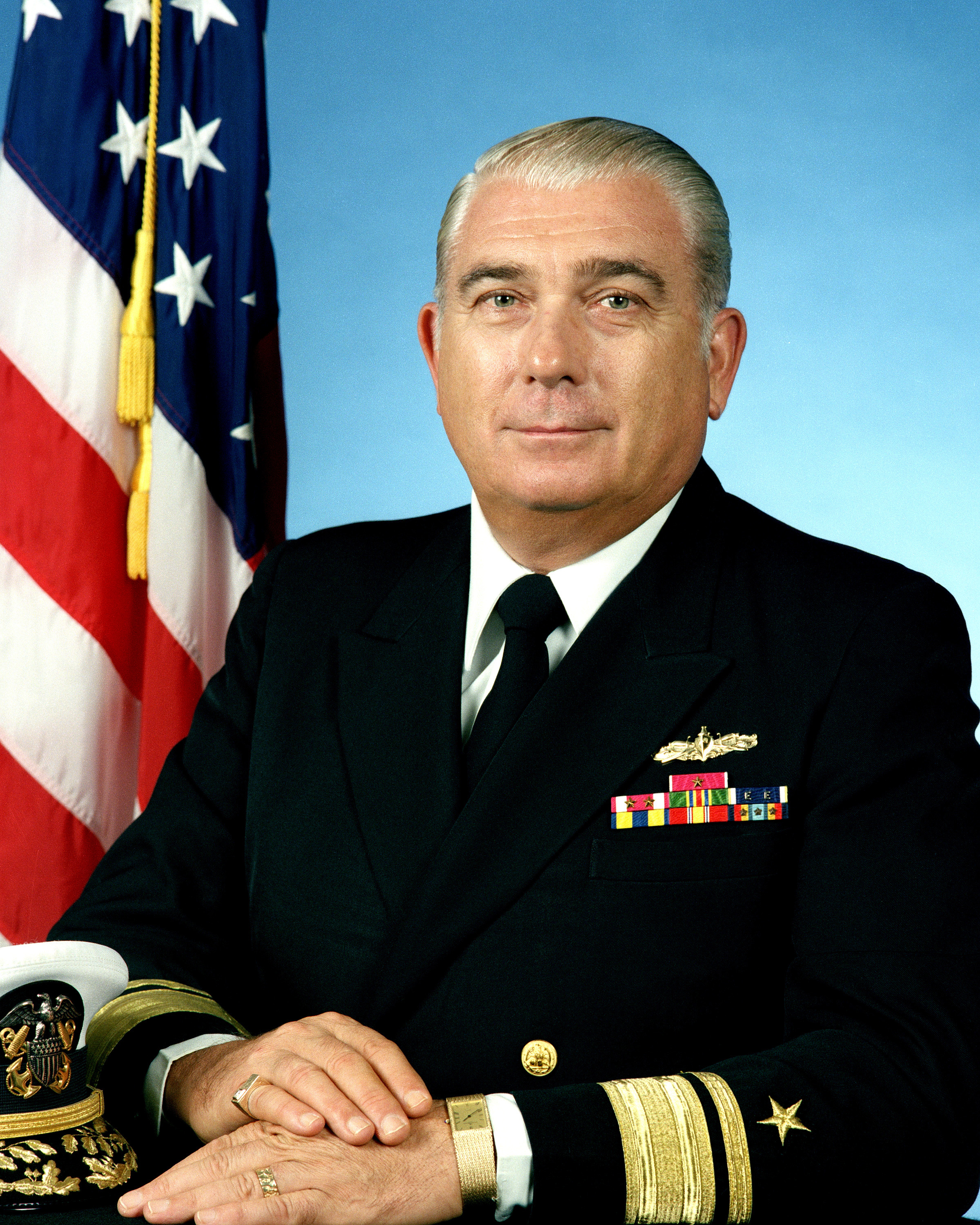
Rear Adm. Reimann in 1990

Robert Theodore Reimann Sr. (August 17, 1936 – June 29, 2014) was a U.S. Navy rear admiral. Born in Cambridge, Massachusetts, he graduated from the Boston University College of Business Administration in 1958. He then attended the Officer Candidate School at Newport, Rhode Island, and was commissioned into the United States Naval Reserve as an ensign on May 1, 1959.

Reimann's first assignment was aboard the destroyer escort Gainard (DD-706). He served as executive officer on the destroyer escort Van Voorhis (DE-1028) and the destroyer Charles H. Roan (DD-853). Reimann was given command of the destroyer escort Courtney (DE-1021) from July 1970 to January 1972 and the destroyer escort Garcia (DE-1040) from April 1972 to August 1973.

After attending the Naval War College in Newport, Rhode Island and serving a shore assignment in Coronado, California, Reimann became executive officer of the guided missile cruiser Chicago (CG-11). He served as the commanding officer of the guided missile cruiser Gridley (CG-21) from January 1982 to December 1984.

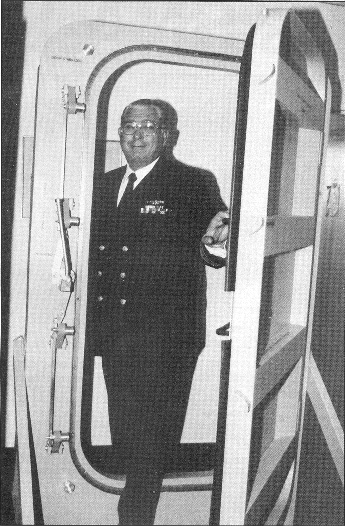
Rear Adm. Robert T. Reimann demonstrates a prototype gasket for shipboard hatches in 1991.

As a flag officer, Reimann commanded Pearl Harbor Naval Base in 1987, was Naval Sea Systems Command's deputy commander for surface combatants in 1989, and was the deputy assistant chief of naval operations for surface warfare in 1991.

At NAVSEA, Reimann helped oversee the 1988–89 repair of the guided missile frigate Samuel B. Roberts (FFG-58) by Bath Iron Works in Portland, Maine, after it was nearly sunk by an Iranian mine during Operation Earnest Will.

Reimann received the Distinguished Service Medal, Defense Superior Service Medal, three awards of the Legion of Merit, and three Meritorious Service Medals.

After retiring from the Navy in January 1993, Reimann went to work for Rumpf Associates International, a defense contractor based in Arlington, Virginia.

He married Iris Johnson, with whom he had two children (Robert Reimann Jr. and Lynne Reimann), and had four granddaughters. They lived in Great Falls, Virginia. After his death in 2014, Reimann Sr. was interred at Arlington National Cemetery.
