= Daniel Voorhees =

Daniel Voorhees may refer to:

- Daniel W. Voorhees (1827–1897), lawyer and United States Senator from Indiana
  - Bust of Daniel W. Voorhees, a public artwork by American artist James Paxton Voorhees
- Daniel S. Voorhees, transient restaurant porter who confessed to the 1947 murder of Elizabeth Short
- Daniel Spader Voorhees (1852–1935), New Jersey state treasurer
