= Donald Voorhees =

Donald Voorhees may refer to:

- Donald Voorhees (conductor) (1903–1989), American composer and conductor
- Donald E. Voorhees (1930–2001), American politician from Iowa
- Donald S. Voorhees (1916–1989), U.S. federal judge
