= Voorhis =

Voorhis is a surname. Notable people with the surname include:

- Charles H. Voorhis (1833–1896), American lawyer and judge
- George Voorhis (1923–1989), American actor, one of many who played Ronald McDonald, mascot of the McDonald's fast food chain
- Jerry Voorhis (1901–1984), American politician
- Nathan Voorhis (born 2004), American football player

== See also ==
- Van Voorhis (disambiguation), including a list of people with the surname
- Voorhees (surname)
- Voorheis
- Voorhies (disambiguation)
