= Francis P. Hammerberg =

United States Navy Medal of Honor recipient

Owen Francis Patrick Hammerberg
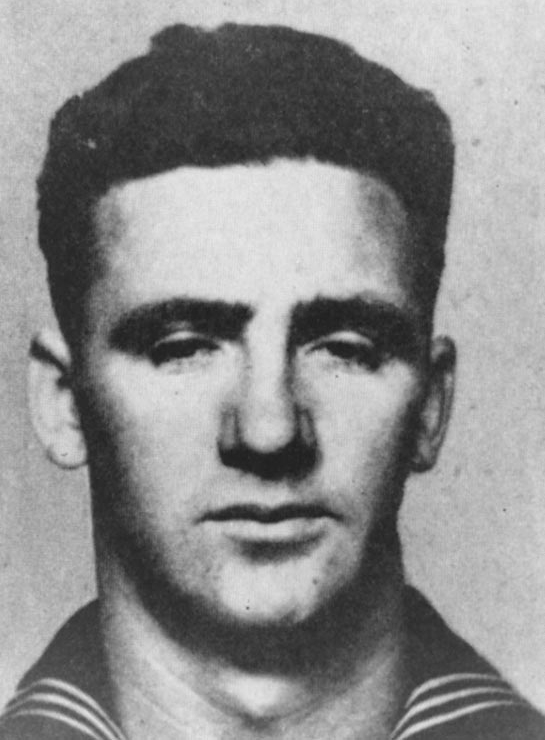
- Boatswain's Mate 2nd Class Owen Francis Patrick Hammerberg
- Born: May 31, 1920; Daggett, Michigan, US
- Died: February 17, 1945 (aged 24); West Loch, Pearl Harbor, Territory of Hawaii
- Burial place: Holy Sepulchre Cemetery, Southfield, Michigan
- Military career
- Allegiance: United States
- Branch: United States Navy
- Service years: 1941-1945
- Rank: Boatswain's Mate Second Class
- Conflicts: World War II
- Awards: Medal of Honor

Owen Francis Patrick Hammerberg (May 31, 1920 – February 17, 1945) was a United States Navy diver who received the Medal of Honor posthumously for rescuing two fellow divers.

== Biography ==
Hammerberg was born at Daggett, Michigan, on May 31, 1920; his family subsequently moved to Flint when he was young.

He enlisted in the United States Navy June 16, 1941 and subsequently served on battleship USS Idaho (BB-42) and mine sweeper USS Advent (AM-83). Later that year, he underwent instruction at the Deep Sea Diving School, Washington, D.C., and was assigned duty with the Mobile Diving Salvage Unit under Service Force, Pacific Fleet.

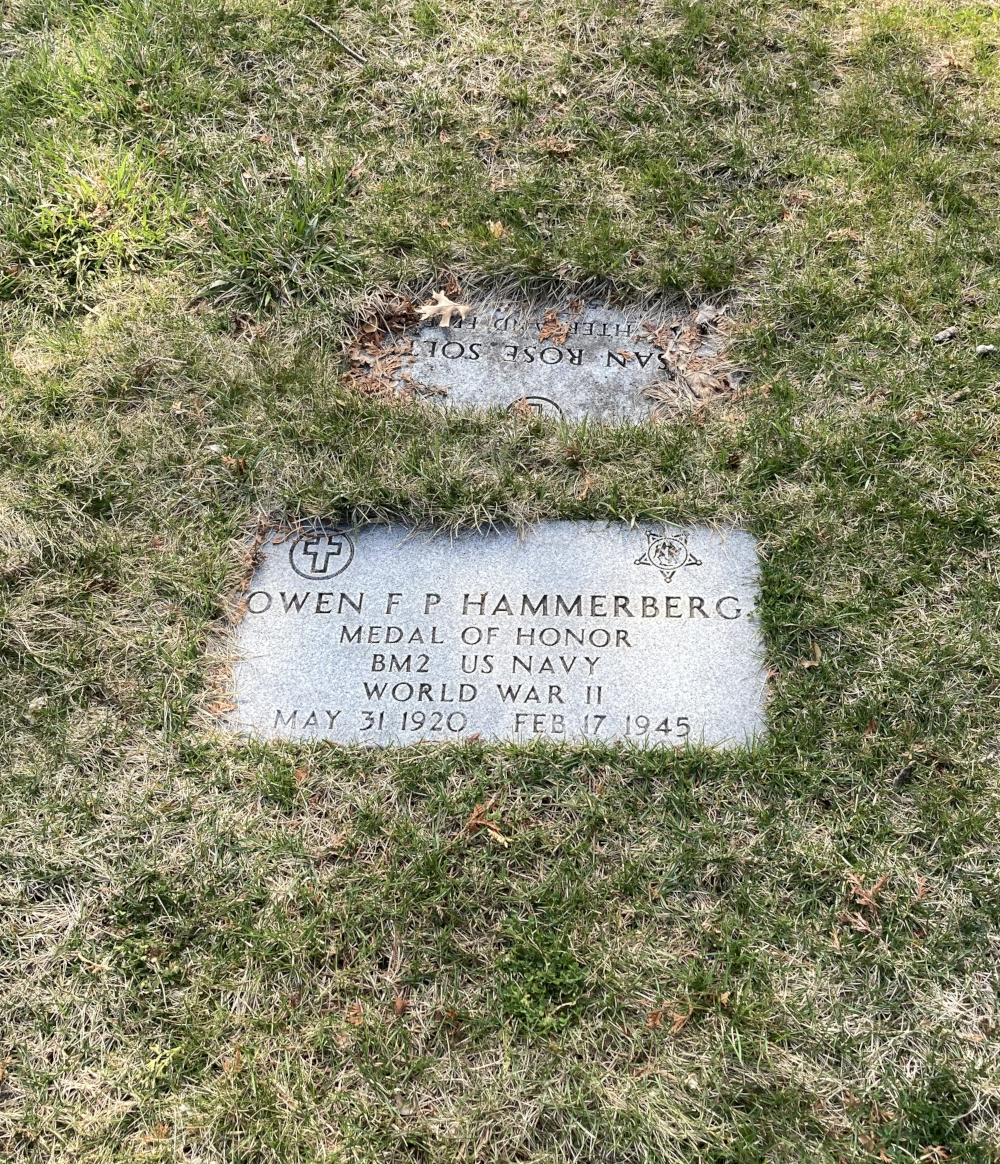
Hammerberg's grave at Holy Sepulchre Cemetery

During salvage in the aftermath of the West Loch Disaster, he lost his life in a rescue operation at Pearl Harbor on February 17, 1945. Disregarding all personal danger, he rescued one diver who had been trapped in a cave-in of steel wreckage while tunneling under a sunken LST. After this rescue, Hammerberg went even farther under the buried hulk and, while rescuing a second diver, was pinned down by another cave-in and perished. Boatswain's Mate Hammerberg posthumously received the Medal of Honor; he is the last person to be awarded the medal for non-combat heroism.

He was buried at Holy Sepulchre Cemetery in Southfield, Michigan.

== Namesake ==
In 1955, the destroyer escort USS Hammerberg (DE-1015) was named for him. A street in Flint and a playing field in Detroit are also named Hammerberg in his honor. In 2021, VFW Post 3720 in Swartz Creek was renamed the Francis P. Hammerberg Memorial Post

== Medal of Honor Citation ==
=== Medal of Honor citation ===
Hammerberg's official Medal of Honor citation reads:

For conspicuous gallantry and intrepidity at the risk of his life above and beyond the call of duty as a diver engaged in rescue operations at West Loch, Pearl Harbor, 17 February 1945. Aware of the danger when 2 fellow divers were hopelessly trapped in a cave-in of steel wreckage while tunneling with jet nozzles under an LST sunk in 40 feet (12 m) of water and 20 feet (6.1 m) of mud. Hammerberg unhesitatingly went overboard in a valiant attempt to effect their rescue despite the certain hazard of additional cave-ins and the risk of fouling his lifeline on jagged pieces of steel imbedded in the shifting mud. Washing a passage through the original excavation, he reached the first of the trapped men, freed him from the wreckage and, working desperately in pitch-black darkness, finally effected his release from fouled lines, thereby enabling him to reach the surface. Wearied but undaunted after several hours of arduous labor, Hammerberg resolved to continue his struggle to wash through the oozing submarine, subterranean mud in a determined effort to save the second diver. Venturing still farther under the buried hulk, he held tenaciously to his purpose, reaching a place immediately above the other man just as another cave-in occurred and a heavy piece of steel pinned him crosswise over his shipmate in a position which protected the man beneath from further injury while placing the full brunt of terrific pressure on himself. Although he succumbed in agony 18 hours after he had gone to the aid of his fellow divers, Hammerberg, by his cool judgment, unfaltering professional skill and consistent disregard of all personal danger in the face of tremendous odds, had contributed effectively to the saving of his 2 comrades. His heroic spirit of self-sacrifice throughout enhanced and sustained the highest traditions of the U.S. Naval Service. He gallantly gave his life in the service of his country.

== Awards and decorations ==

1st row	Medal of Honor	Navy Good Conduct Medal	American Defense Service Medal
2nd row	American Campaign Medal	Asiatic-Pacific Campaign Medal	World War II Victory Medal

== See also ==
- List of Medal of Honor recipients
