= USS Hammerberg =

Dealey-class destroyer escort

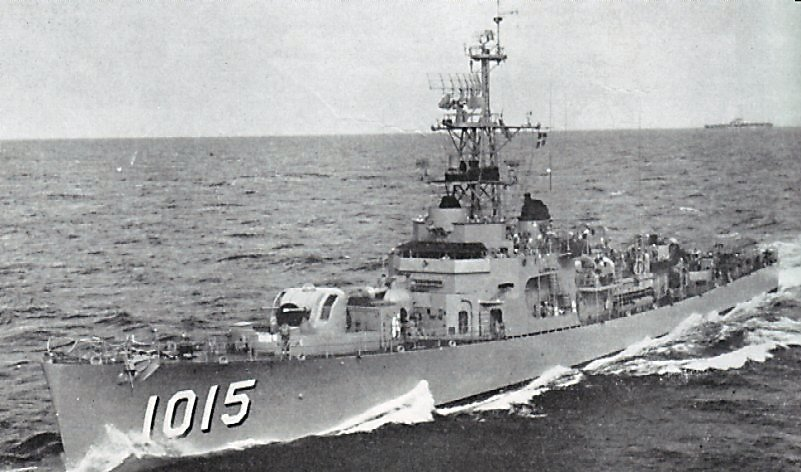

History

United States
- Name: USS Hammerberg
- Namesake: Francis P. Hammerberg
- Builder: Bath Iron Works
- Laid down: 12 November 1953
- Launched: 20 August 1954
- Commissioned: 2 March 1955
- Stricken: 14 December 1973
- Home port: Naval Station Newport, RI
- Fate: Sold for scrap, 14 June 1974

General characteristics
- Class & type: Dealey-class destroyer escort
- Displacement: 1,877 long tons (1,907 t) full load
- Length: 314 ft 6 in (95.86 m)
- Beam: 36 ft 9 in (11.20 m)
- Draft: 18 ft (5.5 m)
- Propulsion: 2 × Foster-Wheeler boilers; 1 × De Laval geared turbine; 20,000 shp (15 MW); 1 shaft
- Speed: 27 knots (31 mph; 50 km/h)
- Range: 6,000 nmi (11,000 km) at 12 kn (14 mph; 22 km/h)
- Complement: 170
- Armament: 4 × 3 inch/50 caliber guns; 1 × Squid ASW mortar; 6 × 324 mm (12.8 in) Mark 32 torpedo tubes; Mark 46 torpedoes

Service record
- Operations: Cuban Missile Crisis

USS Hammerberg (DE-1015), a Dealey-class destroyer escort, was a ship of the United States Navy named for Navy diver Francis P. Hammerberg (1920–1945), of Daggett, Michigan, who was awarded the Medal of Honor posthumously for rescuing two fellow divers from a wreck in Pearl Harbor.

Hammerberg was launched on 20 August 1954 by Bath Iron Works, Bath, Maine, sponsored by Mrs. Elizabeth Moss; and commissioned on 2 March 1955.

Based at Naval Station Newport Rhode Island, Hammerberg participated in convoy exercises, trained students at the Fleet Sonar School, Key West, and conducted antisubmarine warfare exercises during her first 2½ years of service.

== 1950s ==
Hammerberg departed Newport 3 September 1957 to participate in maneuvers with units of NATO. Antisubmarine training in the Irish Sea was followed by visits to Plymouth, England and Brest, France, before the destroyer escort returned to Newport on 21 October. Then, after hunter-killer exercises with the aircraft carrier Tarawa, Hammerberg sailed from Newport 1 April 1958 to Bodø, Norway, to take part in combined exercises with the Royal Norwegian Navy. She returned to Boston 14 May.

During August and September 1958, the Hammerberg was part of Navy Task Force 88 (TF-88), during Operation Argus, which was involved in conducting nuclear tests in the very high atmosphere.

Departing Newport 27 January 1959, Hammerberg sailed to Guantanamo Bay for refresher training, then took part in antisubmarine warfare training with the navies of Chile and Peru. She returned to Newport 21 April.

== 1960s, including the Cuban Missile Crisis ==
Between May 1959 and February 1960, Hammerberg was busy with antisubmarine exercises interspersed with cruises to Newfoundland and Puerto Rico. In March and April, she participated in Amphibious operations at Onslow Beach, N.C., and deployed on 23 August 1960 for her second South American cruise. Hammerberg returned to Newport on 13 December.

Hammerberg departed Newport 7 August 1961 on her third South American cruise. In November, at the request of the Organization of American States (OAS), Hammerberg and other American ships patrolled offshore the Dominican Republic to help ensure the orderly change over of that government and check Communist influence. Hammerberg returned to Newport 1 December.

During 1962, Hammerberg participated in convoy escort operations and operated with the Fleet Sonar School in Key West. On 7 November, Hammerberg was en route south to NS Mayport, Fla., where she was diverted to patrol the Florida Coast during the Cuban Missile Crisis. On 29 November, after President John F. Kennedy had resolved the Cuban Crisis, she sailed for Newport, R.I., for a well-deserved rest and tender availability.

1963 found Hammerberg in the Boston Naval Shipyard. From June to November, she devoted time to "Unites IV"—a deployment which was to comprise the circumnavigation of South America in the conduct of ASW operations with seven South American navies. On 30 November, Hammerberg sailed to Guantanamo Bay, Cuba, for participation in "PHIBASWEX I-63", a large-scale amphibious, ASW operation with over 30 other units of the Atlantic Fleet. On 17 December, she arrived Newport, R.I.

During 1964, Hammerberg participated in Operations "Springboard", "Canus Silex", and "Steel Pike", all exercises to sharpen the ship and crew not only in her important mission of locating and destroying submarines, but also in patrol, escort, rescue, evacuation, blockade and surveillance assignments.

On 8 February 1965, Hammerberg got underway for Northern Europe to join NATO "Match Maker I" Squadron in Exercise "Pilot High". On 3 May, the squadron left Lisbon for Operation "Pole Star" off Halifax, Nova Scotia. After return to Newport 20 July, Hammerberg went into repair at Boston Naval Shipyard. She then trained off Guantanamo Bay, Cuba, and in August 1966 rendezvoused with escort Van Voorhis, guided missile frigate Leahy and submarine Requin off Trinidad to participate in Operation "Unitas VII" through November.

In late March while serving plane guard duty astern of USS Essex (CVS 9), Hammerberg attempted to rescue the crew of a downed SH3A Sikorsky Sea King helicopter. The rescue attempt was unsuccessful, with the loss of 3 crew.

In April 1967, Hammerberg participated in operation "Clove Hitch III", a joint armed forces amphibious assault exercise in the Caribbean, with liberty ports in San Juan and St. Thomas, returning to Newport on 2 May. In June, Hammerberg departed for a NATO operation "Newlook" off Nova Scotia in which ships from the Netherlands, Canada, and the United Kingdom participated. At the completion of Newlook, and liberty in Halifax, Hammerberg proceeded to New York City for liberty on the weekend of 17 June. On 28 June, Hammerberg moved to Davisville, RI for 6 days of drydock to install a new screw and do minor hull repairs.

In late September, Hammerberg deployed for the Mediterranean as part of a "Hunter-Killer" group operation consisting of several destroyers/destroyer escorts and the USS Randolph (CVS-15). Liberty ports included Barcelona, Naples, Palma Majorca, and Gibraltar. Hammerberg returned to Newport in mid-December.

== Fate ==
Hammerberg was stricken from the Naval Vessel Register 14 December 1973. She was sold for scrapping 14 June 1974.
