= Naval Air Station Fallon =

Military air base and training facility near Fallon, Nevada, USA

- Van Voorhis Field
- Near Fallon, Nevada in the United States
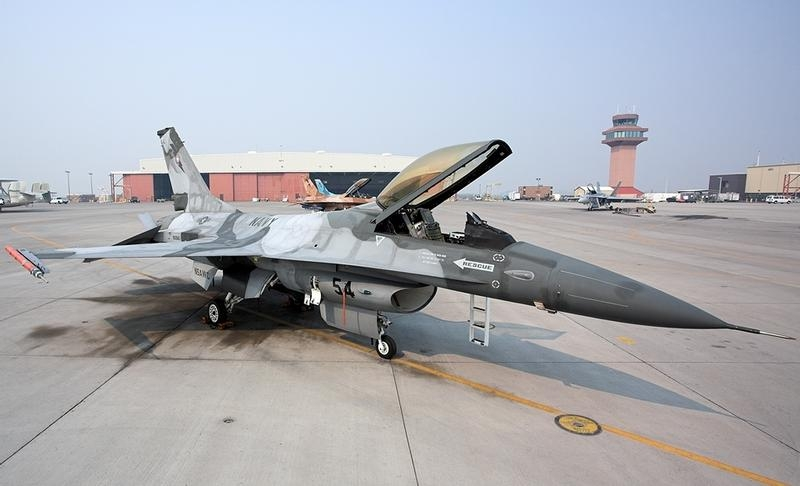
- A U.S. Navy F-16A Fighting Falcon of the Naval Aviation Warfighting Development Center based at NAS Fallon

Site information
- Type: Naval Air Station
- Owner: Department of War
- Operator: U.S. Navy
- Controlled by: Navy Region Southwest
- Condition: Operational
- Other site facilities: Naval Aviation Warfighting Development Center
- Website: cnic.navy.mil/regions/cnrsw/installations/nas_fallon

Location
- Location in the United States
- Coordinates: 39°25′30″N 118°42′10″W

Site history
- Built: 1942
- In use: 1942 – present

Garrison information
- Current commander: Captain Michael J. Haymon

Airfield information
- Identifiers: IATA: NFL, ICAO: KNFL, FAA LID: NFL, WMO: 692364
- Elevation: 1,199.3 metres (3,935 ft) AMSL
Runways
Direction	Length and surface
13R/31L	4,267.5 metres (14,001 ft) asphalt
13L/31R	3,375.9 metres (11,076 ft) concrete
7/25	2,134.2 metres (7,002 ft) asphalt

Naval Air Station Fallon or NAS Fallon (IATA: NFL, ICAO: KNFL, FAA LID: NFL) is the United States Navy's premier air-to-air and air-to-ground training facility. It is located southeast of the city of Fallon, east of Reno in western Nevada. Since 1996, it has been home to the U.S. Navy-Fighter Weapons School (TOPGUN) taking over from the former NAS Miramar, California, and the surrounding area contains 240,000 acres (97,000 ha) of bombing and electronic warfare ranges. It is also home to the Naval Aviation Warfighting Development Center (NAWDC), which includes TOPGUN, the Carrier Airborne Early Warning Weapons School (CAEWWS), and the Navy Rotary Wing Weapons School. Navy SEAL and Combat Search and Rescue (CSAR) training also take place there.

The airfield is named Van Voorhis Field in honor of Commander Bruce Van Voorhis (1908–1943), who was posthumously awarded the Medal of Honor.

== History ==
The airfield at NAS Fallon was originally built in 1942 as part of a defensive network to repel a feared Japanese invasion of the west coast. It was soon taken over by the Navy for training use and has been used as such ever since with the exception of the period of 1946 to 1951, during which it was used by the Bureau of Indian Affairs. During the years prior to 1972, the base was known as Naval Auxiliary Air Station and was heavily used during the Vietnam War by various squadrons that rotated through the base before deploying to carriers headed for the Vietnam theater. During these same years prior to 1972, many ground troops were temporarily assigned to NAS Fallon for their hot weather training (during the summer months) and cold weather training (during the winter months). On January 1, 1972, the Navy recognized NAS Fallon's importance to naval aviation by upgrading the base from auxiliary air station status to a major aviation command as a full-fledged naval air station. While NAS Fallon provides training for visiting carrier air wings, Strike Fighter Squadron 127 (VFA-127), the "Desert Bogeys", was the air station's only permanently based squadron from October 1987 until it was disestablished on March 23, 1996.

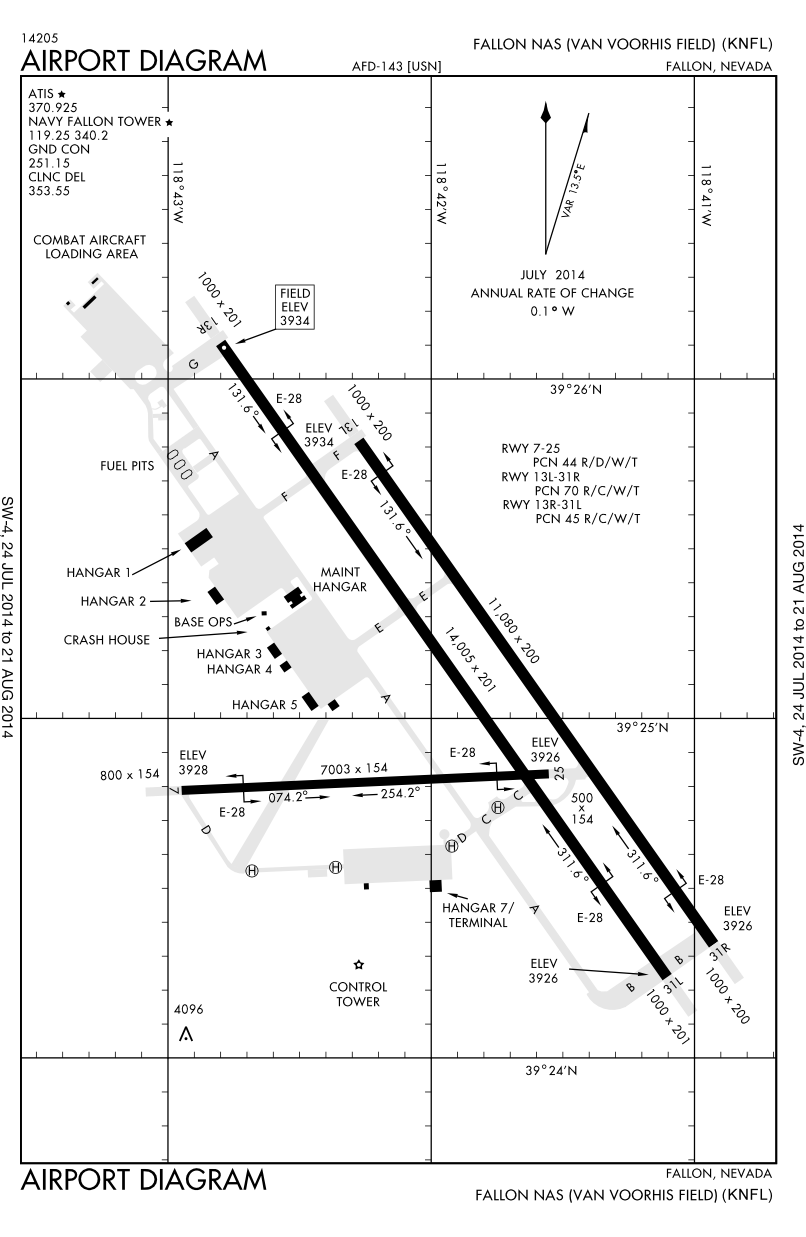

The Navy relocated its Navy Fighter Weapons School, or TOPGUN, from NAS Miramar to NAS Fallon in 1996, following the transfer of NAS Miramar to the Marine Corps and its redesignation as MCAS Miramar. This move resulted in the construction of a new ramp, hangars and academic buildings. The new command, Naval Strike and Air Warfare Center (NSAWC), was established on July 11, 1996, and was a unification of TOPGUN, Strike University (Strike U), the Naval Strike Warfare Center, and TOPDOME, the Carrier Airborne Early Warning Weapons School. In addition to transferring the NSAWC squadron, a Navy Reserve adversary squadron, Fighter Squadron Composite THIRTEEN (VFC-13), the "Fighting Saints," was also permanently relocated from its former base at NAS Miramar to NAS Fallon. As a result, VFC-13 replaced the disestablished VFA-127 in the fighter adversary role.

Associated bombing ranges checker the surrounding Lahontan Valley and Dixie Valley, which is the next valley to the east. Dixie Valley also contains a simulated air defense network, including approximately 20 operational radar installations. Many demilitarized armored vehicles, including some exotics, have been scattered throughout the area, presumably for ambiance. Most of this area is publicly accessible, with the exception of areas immediately surrounding the radar installations. The entire training area surrounding NAS Fallon is known as the Fallon Range Training Complex (FRTC).

=== USAF Radar Station ===
Between 1956 and 1975, the United States Air Force Air Defense Command (ADC) operated a General Surveillance Radar station at NAS Fallon. The Air Force area was named Fallon Air Force Station (AFS) and designated ADC site SM-156 (later NORAD site Z-156). The 858th Aircraft Control and Warning Squadron moved to Fallon AFS from Hamilton Air Force Base (AFB), California in the south central section of NAS Fallon in 1956. It initially activated AN/MPS-7 search and AN/MPS-14 height-finder radar sets, and initially the station functioned as a Ground Control Intercept (GCI) and warning station. As a GCI station, the squadron's role was to guide interceptor aircraft toward unidentified intruders picked up on the unit's radar scopes. An AN/FPS-3 search set briefly saw service in 1959.

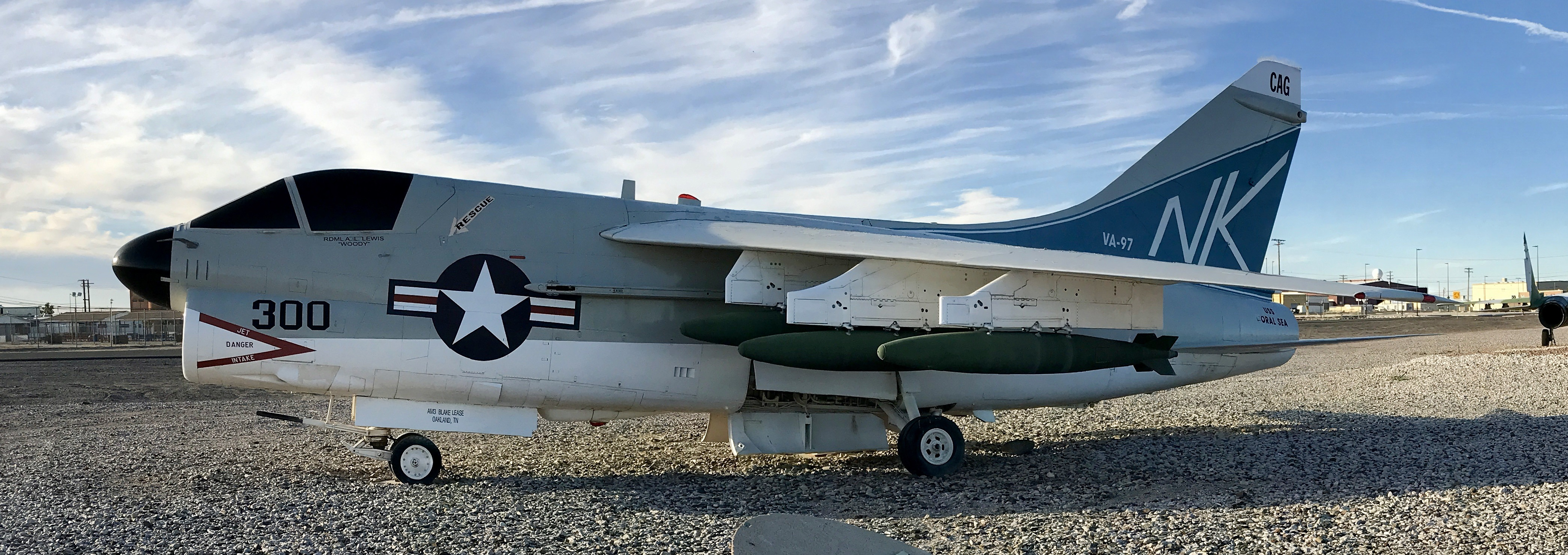
A VA-97 A-7 Corsair II at Naval Air Station Fallon Nevada US Air Park Museum that was on the USS Coral Sea flown by Vice Admiral Andrew ("Woody") L. Lewis

During 1962, Fallon AFS joined the Semi Automatic Ground Environment (SAGE) system, initially feeding data to DC-16 at Stead AFB, Nevada. After joining, the squadron was redesignated as the 858th Radar Squadron (SAGE) on December 1, 1962. The radar squadron provided information 24/7 to the SAGE Direction Center, where it was analyzed to determine range, direction, altitude, speed, and whether or not aircraft were friendly or hostile. Also, in this time frame, the radar site was relocated from the original location in the south central part of Naval Air Station Fallon's grounds to the far southwest corner. At the new SAGE radar site, the squadron used an AN/FPS-35 search radar that replaced the AN/MPS-7 set in 1963. In 1964, an AN/FPS-6 height-finder radar was added.

In addition to the main facility at NAS Fallon, the squadron also operated a remote AN/FPS-14 gap filler site:

- Gabbs, NV (SM-156A): 38°46′28″N 118°01′17″W

Around 1965, NAS Fallon became an FAA/ADC joint-use facility. The AN/MPS-14 radar was retired in 1969. In the early 1970s, the AN/FPS-35 was replaced with an AN/FPS-66A.

Over the years, the equipment at the station was upgraded or modified to improve the efficiency and accuracy of the information gathered by radars. The 858th Radar Sq. was inactivated and replaced by the 858th Air Defense Group in March 1970. The upgrade to group status was done because of Fallon AFS' status as a Backup Interceptor Control (BUIC) master control center site. BUIC sites were alternate control sites if SAGE Direction Centers became disabled and unable to control interceptor aircraft. The group was inactivated and replaced by the 858th Radar Squadron as defenses against crewed bombers were reduced only to be inactivated in June 1975. The group was disbanded in 1984. The FAA retained the AN/FPS-66A search radar, still in-use today and is networked into the Joint Surveillance System (JSS); the radar tower still is painted with red-and-white checkerboard.

== Museum ==
The Navy maintains Naval Air Station Fallon Air Park museum on the base.

== Search and rescue team ==
Since 1972, the base has had its own search and rescue team. Originally named Desert Angels and later renamed Longhorns, the team's mission was to provide search and rescue support for visiting Carrier Air Wings and other NAS Fallon tenant commands. The Longhorns flew the Bell UH-1N from 1972 to 2009 and the Sikorsky SH-60F from 2009 to 2011. The team flew the Sikorsky MH-60S until its disestabliment in 2022 when SAR responsibilities shifted to the Naval Aviation Warfare Development Command's Navy Rotary Wing Weapons School. The Longhorns frequently supported civilian search, rescue and medical evacuation efforts in conjunction with local law enforcement, medical and search and rescue agencies.

== Gallery ==
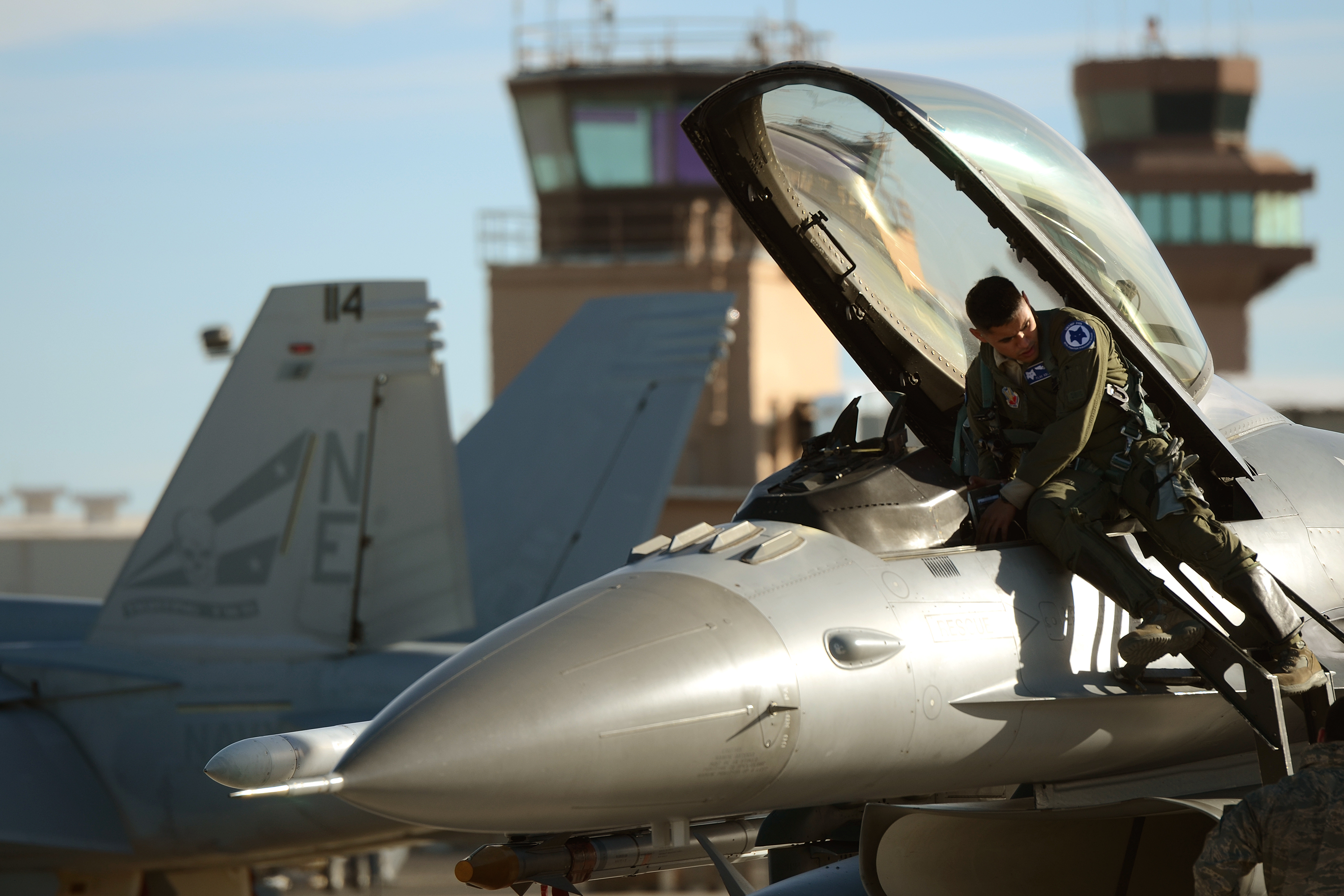
A 157th Fighter Squadron F-16 Fighting Falcon prepares for a mission, November 2014.

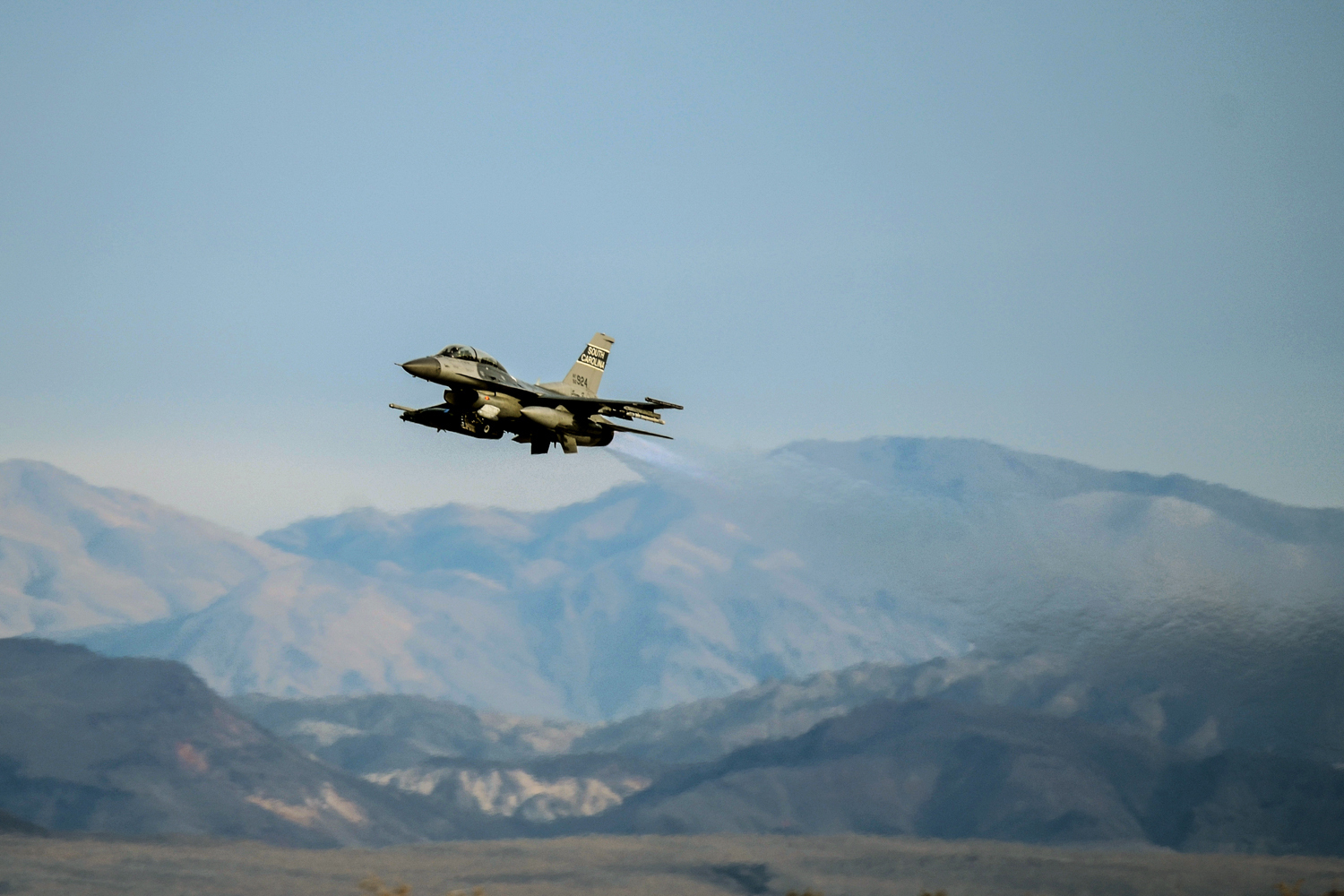
A 157th Fighter Squadron F-16 Fighting Falcon takes off, November 2014.

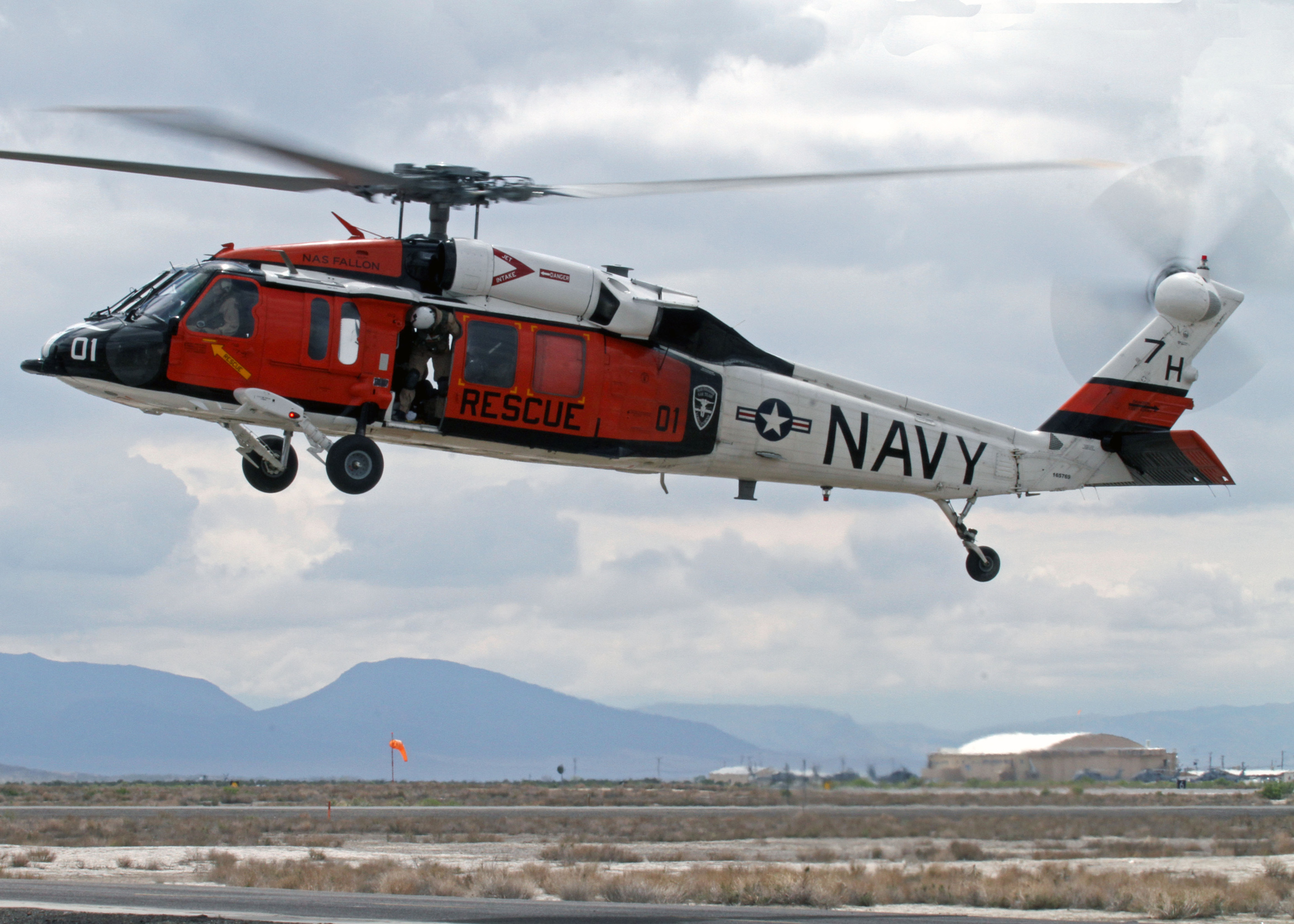
A U.S. Navy Sikorsky MH-60S Sea Hawk helicopter (BuNo 165769) attached to the "Longhorns"

== See also ==
- List of United States Navy airfields
- United States Air Force Weapons School– an equivalent Top Gun School of the air force, based in Nellis AFB, Nevada.
