= Voorheis =

Voorheis is a surname. Notable people with the surname include:

- Bernie Voorheis (1922–2010), American basketball player
- Isaac I. Voorheis (1799–1886), American politician

== See also ==
- Voorhees (surname)
- Voorhies (disambiguation)
- Voorhis
