= VFA-127 =

Strike Fighter Squadron 127
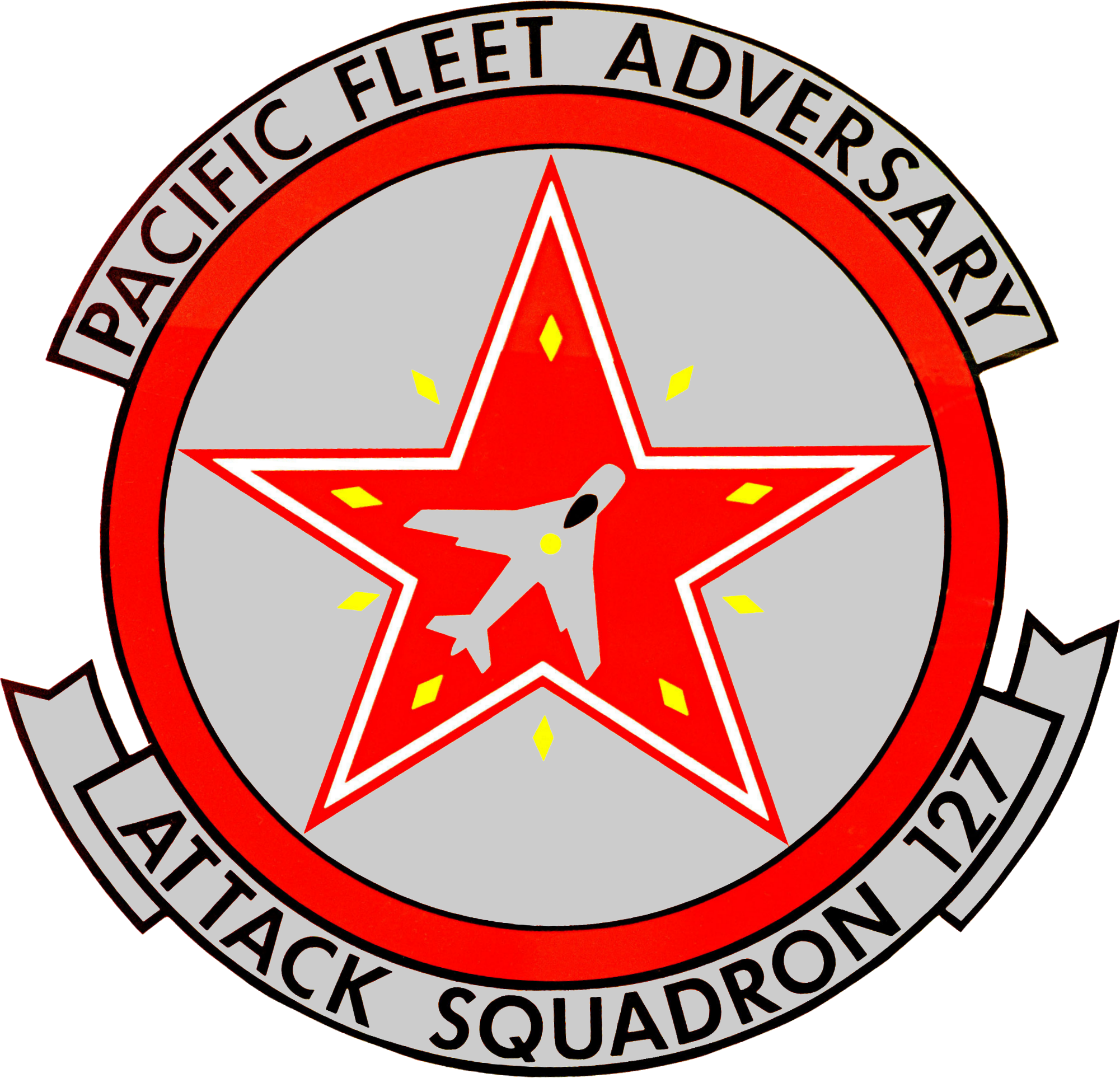
- VA-127 patch
- Active: 15 June 1962 – 23 March 1996
- Country: United States
- Branch: United States Navy
- Type: Attack
- Part of: Inactive
- Nicknames: Royal Blues; Cylons

Aircraft flown
- Attack: Grumman F-9F-8T/TF-9J Cougar; TA-4F/J & A-4E/F; T-38B & QT-38A Talon; F-5E/F Tiger II; F/A-18 Hornet

VFA-127, nicknamed the Royal Blues from the 1960s to 1980, and the Cylons from 1981 onward, was a Strike Fighter Squadron of the U.S. Navy. Established as an Attack Squadron designated VA-127 on 15 June 1962 at NAS Lemoore, California, it was redesignated VFA-127 on 1 March 1987 and disestablished on 23 March 1996.

== Operational history ==
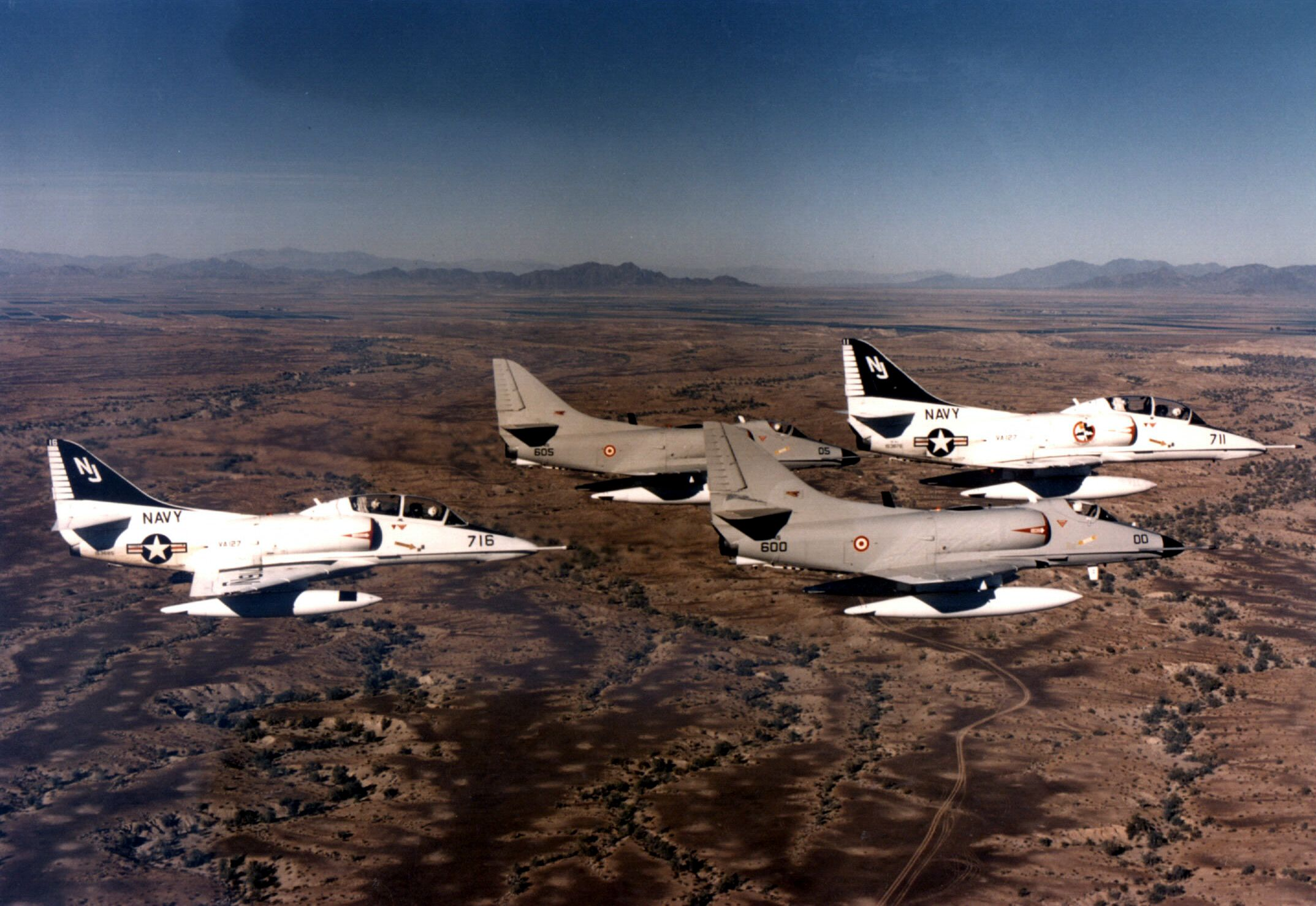
VA-127 TA-4Js and Singapore Air Defense Command A-4S's in 1974

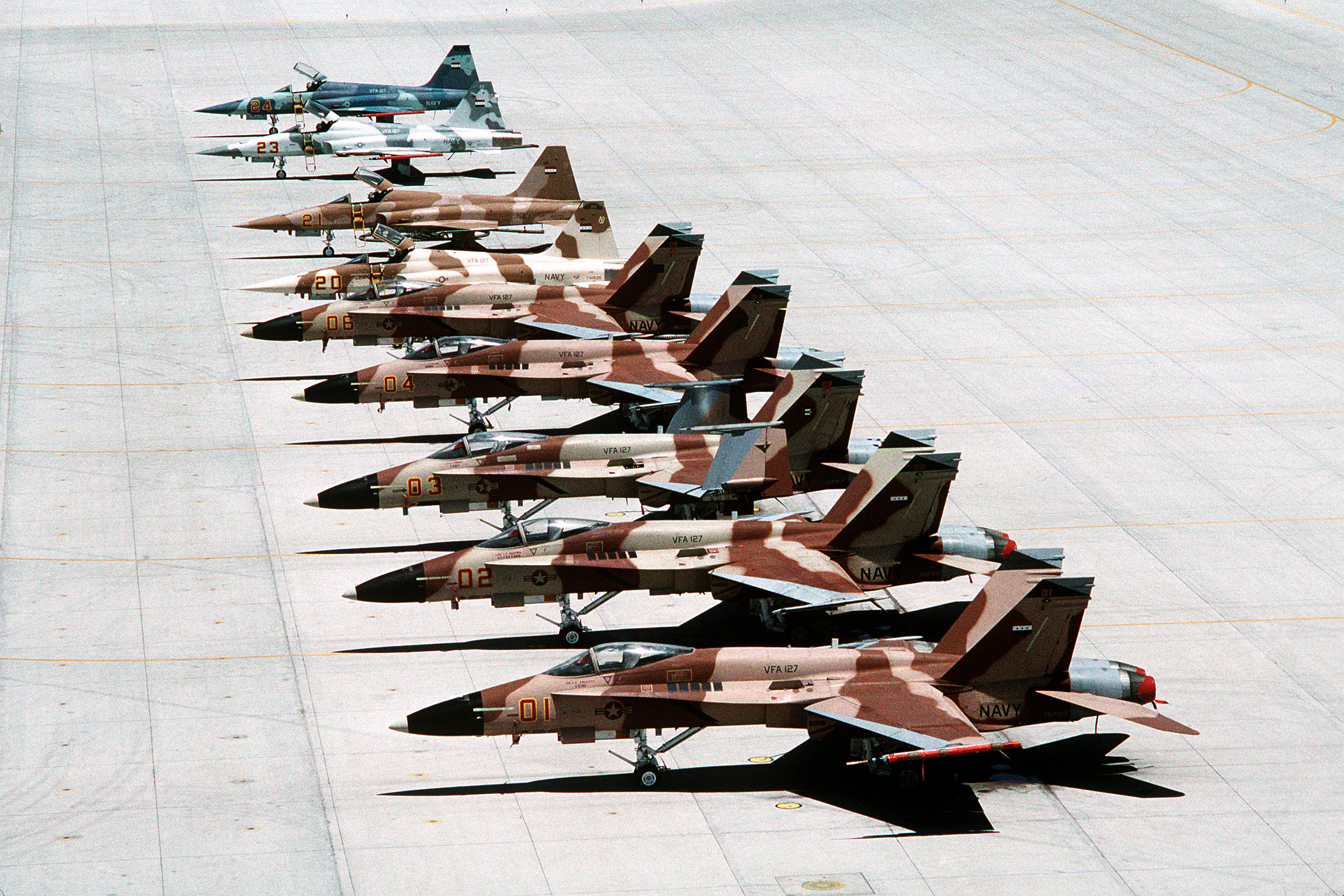
VFA-127 F-5Ns and F/A-18s at NAS Fallon, Nevada in 1993

Prior to being established as VA-127, the unit operated as VA-126 Detachment Alfa with a mission to provide basic and refresher all-weather jet instrument and transition training for pilots on the West Coast. Upon being redesignated VA-127, its primary mission became to provide advanced all-weather jet instrument training for fleet replacement pilots and refresher training for light jet attack pilots. A secondary mission included jet transition and refresher training.

On 1 Jun 1970, the squadron's mission was modified when it was designated as the only A-4 Replacement Air Wing squadron in the Navy. The primary mission included fleet replacement pilot training, basic and refresher all weather jet instrument training and replacement enlisted training in both the TA-4 and A-4 model aircraft, plus the ancillary mission of providing jet transition training. The flight syllabus included weapons delivery (conventional and nuclear), airborne electronic countermeasures, field mirror landing practice, low level navigation, inflight aerial refueling, defensive tactics and carrier qualifications (day and night). In 1971, the squadron expanded its training on the A-4 to include personnel from the Argentine Navy; previously it had trained only U.S. naval aviators. That same year, it also began training pilots of the Singapore Air Defense Command.

In 1975, the squadron's primary mission changed once again. Fleet Replacement Pilot training and the Fleet Replacement Aviation Maintenance Program were discontinued. The squadron's new missions included basic refresher all weather jet instrument training, air combat maneuvering adversary training, foreign pilot training, and jet transition/refresher training. In November 1975, CNO officially tasked VA-127 with the mission of air combat maneuvering (ACM) adversary training. On 1 Oct 1983, The squadron's instrument training mission was dropped and the primary mission became the Adversary Role (Dissimilar Air Combat Maneuvering).

== Home port assignment ==
- NAS Lemoore
- NAS Fallon from 1 October 1987

== Aircraft assignment ==
VFA-127 flew these aircraft, beginning in the years shown:

- Grumman F-9F-8T/TF-9J Cougar (1962)
- Douglas A-4 Skyhawk: TA-4F (1966), A-4F (1970), A-4E (1970), and TA-4J (1971)
- Northrop T-38B & QT-38A Talon (1987)
- Northrop F-5E/F Tiger II (1987)
- McDonnell Douglas F/A-18 Hornet (1992)

== See also ==
- History of the United States Navy
- List of inactive United States Navy aircraft squadrons
