= Voorhies Castle =

Historic house in Illinois, United States

- U.S. National Register of Historic Places
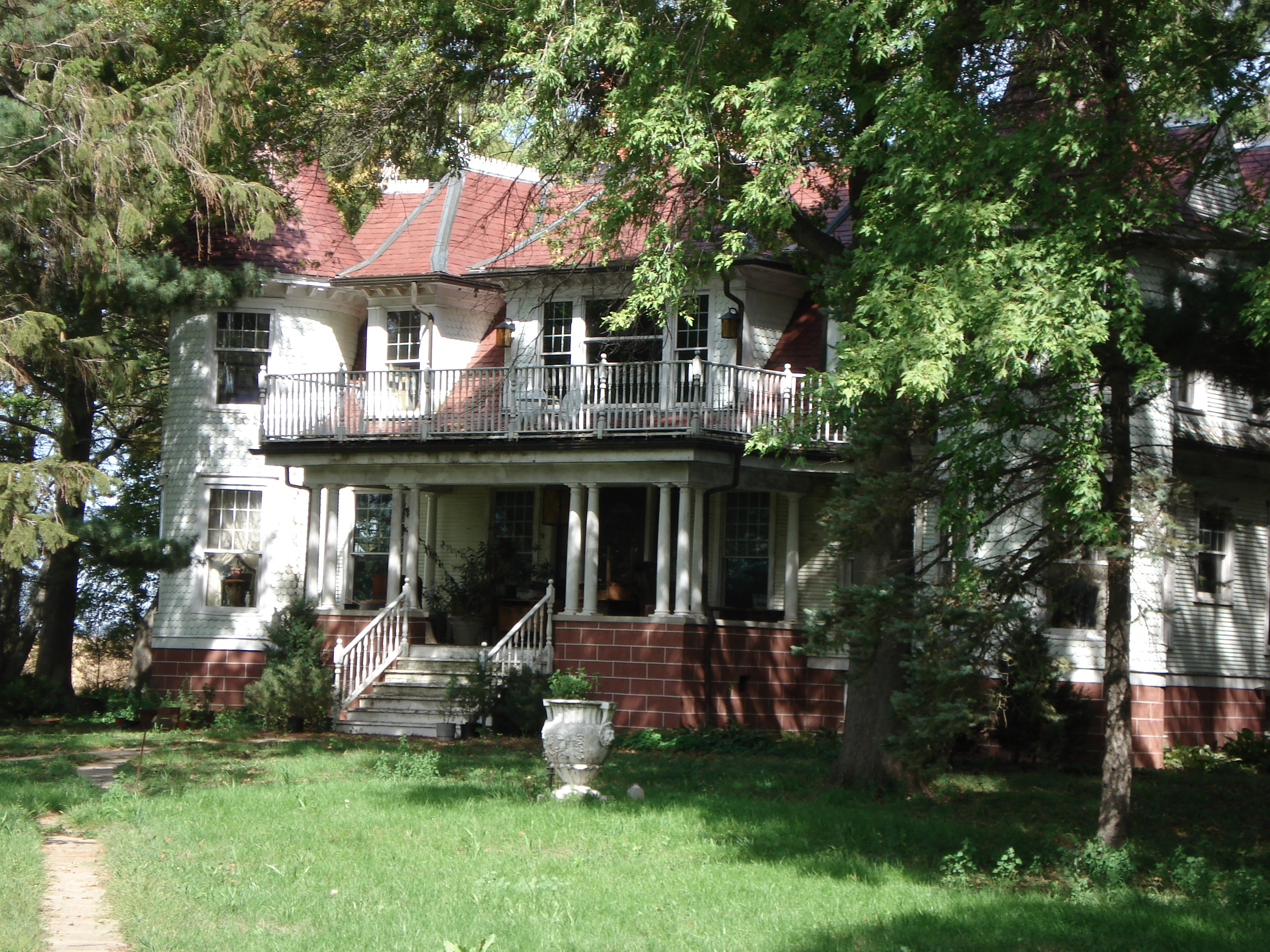

- Location within Illinois Location within the United States
- Location: Voorhies, Piatt County, Illinois
- Nearest city: Bement, Illinois
- Coordinates: 39°52′01″N 88°34′48″W
- Area: less than one acre
- Built: 1900-04
- Architect: Schroeder, William H
- Architectural style: Queen Anne
- NRHP reference No.: 79000861
- Added to NRHP: June 20, 1979

The Voorhies Castle is a Victorian home located in Voorhies, a small community 4 miles (6.4 km) south of Bement in Piatt County, Illinois.

== History ==
Nels Larson, a Swedish immigrant who at one point controlled all the land in Voorhies, commissioned the house for himself in 1900; construction was completed in 1904. The two-story house was designed to resemble a Swedish palatial manor, and its name comes from its castle-like appearance; while its design resembles Queen Anne architecture, its symmetrical plan distinguishes it from the style. Its unusual appearance made it a local attraction which drew visitors from throughout central Illinois. After his wife Johannah's death in 1914, Larson abandoned his castle, which sat empty until the 1970s.

== Architecture ==
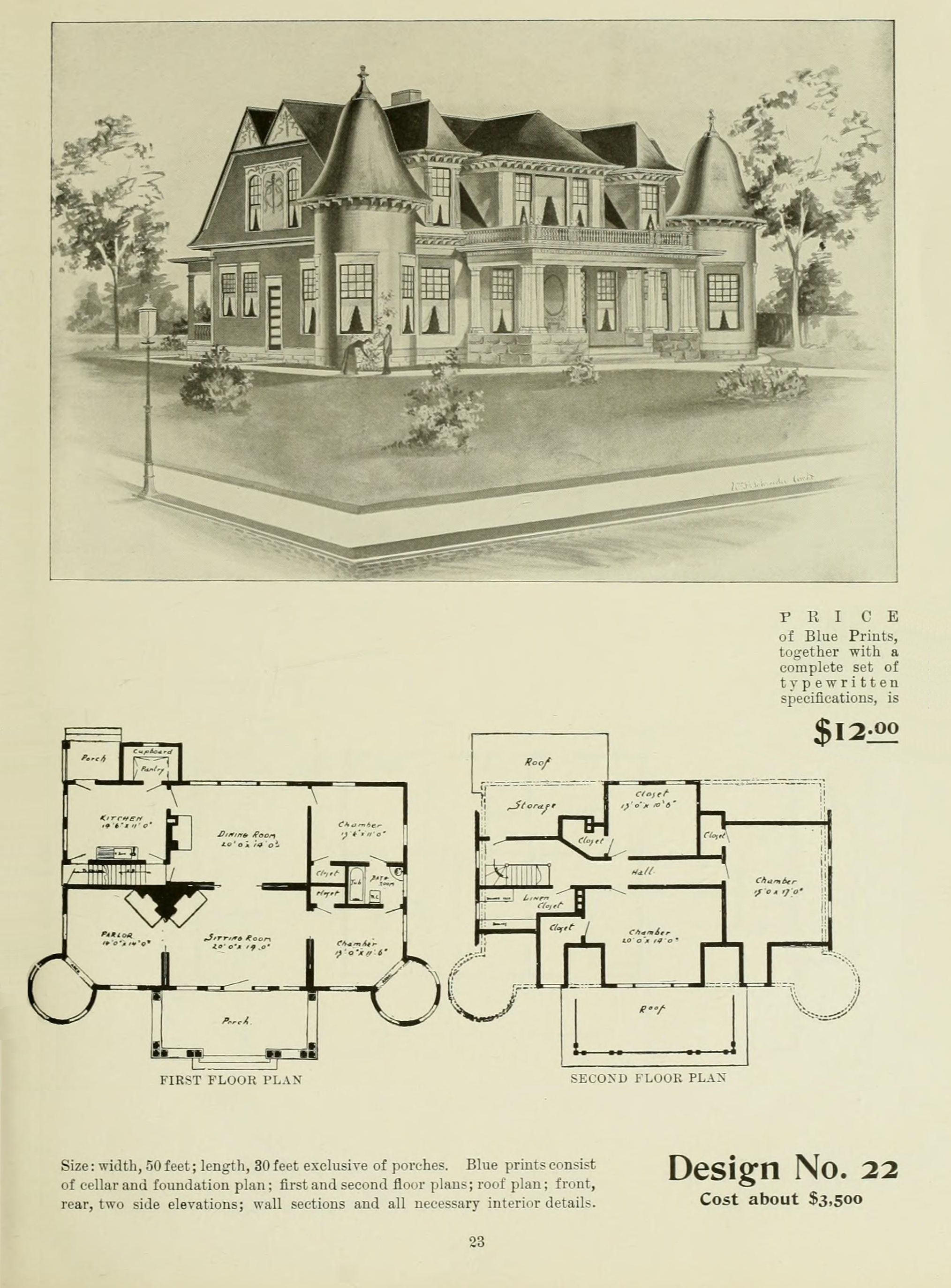
The house as it appeared as Design No. 22 on p.23 in Radford Architectural Company's architectural pattern book of 1903 entitled The Radford Ideal Homes - 100 House Plans 100, the only difference being the shortened towers. The architect's signature can be found in the lower right-hand corner.

The house's southern corners feature round turrets, each with a conical roof and a finial. While the turrets were originally a story taller than the house to provide views of the surrounding area, Larson later had them lowered for aesthetic reasons. The main entrance to the house, located between the turrets, features a portico with Doric columns and a balustrade along the second-story porch roof. The second story of the house is sided with scalloped wooden shingles, a Queen Anne-inspired element which contrasts with the roof shingles. In addition to the turrets, the roof includes both gabled and hipped sections and dormers, which is typical of Queen Anne works. Decorative iron pieces top the roof's various ridges, and Swedish-styled lightning rods are located in several places.

Larson also built a clock tower barn on his property in 1905. The clock tower stood 68 feet (21 m) tall and included a Seth Thomas clockworks, which the company considered "the finest they could make". The tower's brass bell could reportedly be heard up to 5 miles (8.0 km) away. A tornado destroyed the barn in 1976.

The house was added to the National Register of Historic Places in 1979.
