= Voorhees Township, Kansas =

Township in Stevens County, Kansas, U.S.

Voorhees Township
- Township
- Location within Stevens County
- Coordinates: 37.061258°N 101.420118°W
- Country: United States
- State: Kansas
- County: Stevens

Area
  - Total: 134.976 sq mi (349.59 km^{2})
  - Land: 134.976 sq mi (349.59 km^{2})
  - Water: 0 sq mi (0 km^{2}) 0%

Population (2020)
  - Total: 111
  - Density: 0.822/sq mi (0.318/km^{2})
- Time zone: UTC-6 (CST)
  - Summer (DST): UTC-5 (CDT)
- Area code: 620
- GNIS feature ID: 470655

Voorhees Township is a township in Stevens County, Kansas, United States. As of the 2020 census, its population was 111.

== History ==
Two townships were absorbed into Voorhees Township in the 1890s: Lafayette Township and Niagara Township.

== Geography ==
Voorhees Township covers an area of 134.976 square miles (349.59 square kilometers).

=== Adjacent townships ===
West Center Township, Stevens County
		north	northeast	Center Township, Stevens County
Rolla Township, Morton County	west	self	east	Banner Township, Stevens County
		south
Texas County, Oklahoma

== Transportation ==
=== Major highways ===
- K-25

== Demographics ==
As of the 2020 census, there were 111 people and 38 households residing in the township. The population density was 0.822 people per square mile (0.317 people/km^{2}). There were 58 housing units. The racial makeup of the township was 82.9% White, 1.8% Native American, 7.2% from some other race, and 8.1% from two or more races. Hispanics or Latinos of any race were 16.2% of the population.

There were 38 households: 78.9% were married couples living together and 21.1% had a female householder with no spouse present. The average family size was 4.43 people. 36.6% of people in the township older than 24 had a college degree, and the township had an employment rate of 86.2%.
