= Voorhies, Illinois =

- Unincorporated community
- Location within Illinois Location within the United States
- Coordinates: 39°52′01″N 88°34′48″W
- Country: United States
- State: Illinois
- County: Piatt
- Township: Unity
- Elevation: 682 ft (208 m)
- Time zone: UTC-6 (Central (CST))
  - Summer (DST): UTC-5 (CDT)
- Area code: 217
- GNIS feature ID: 420345

Voorhies is an unincorporated community in Unity Township, Piatt County, Illinois, United States. Voorhies is located near Illinois Route 105, 3.8 miles (6.1 km) south of Bement. Voorhies Castle, which is listed on the National Register of Historic Places, is located in Voorhies.
