= Bruce Van Voorhis =

Military person

Bruce Avery Van Voorhis
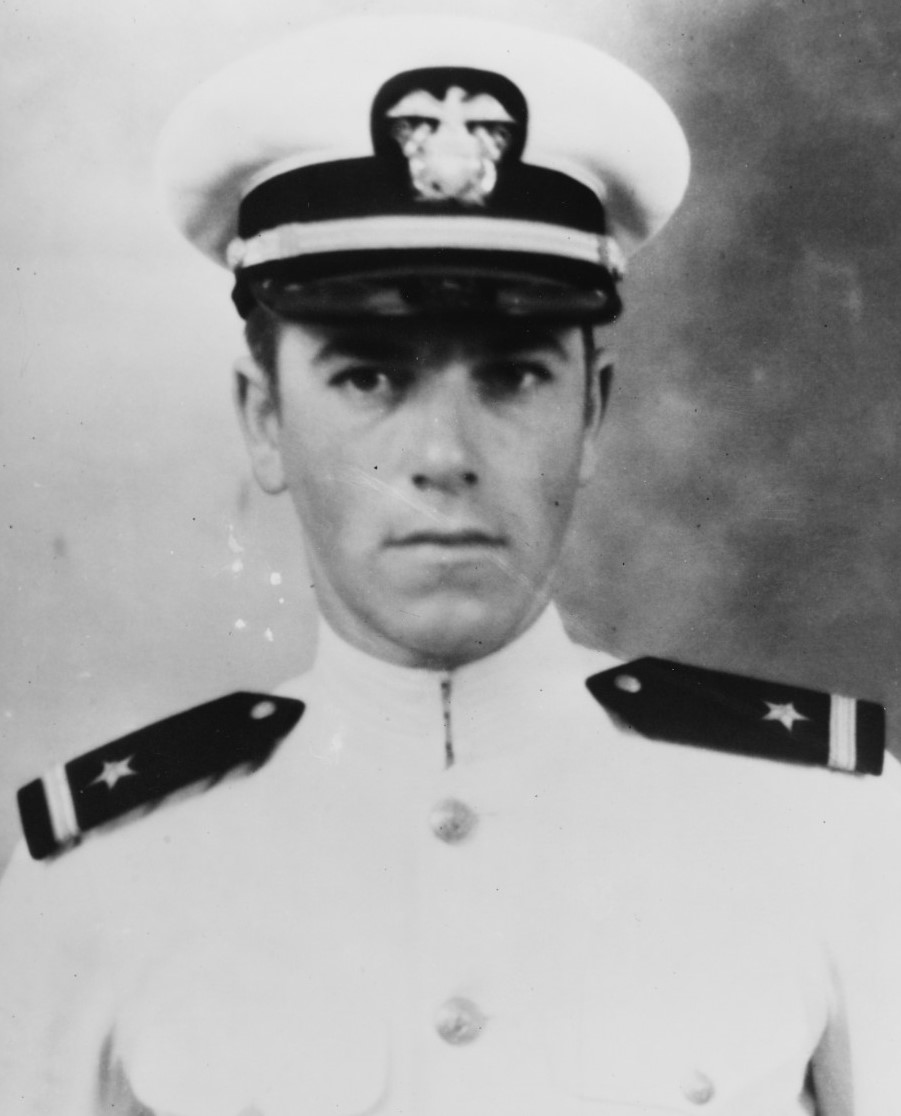
- Born: January 29, 1908; Aberdeen, Washington
- Died: July 6, 1943 (aged 35); Kapingamarangi Atoll, Eastern Caroline Islands
- Burial place: Jefferson Barracks National Cemetery St. Louis County, Missouri
- Military career
- Allegiance: United States
- Branch: United States Navy
- Service years: 1929–1943
- Rank: Commander (posthumous)
- Commands: Bombing Squadron 102
- Conflicts: World War II
- Awards: Medal of Honor; Purple Heart

Bruce Avery Van Voorhis (January 29, 1908 – July 6, 1943) was a United States Navy aviator who was shot down in the Pacific theater during World War II. For his action on July 6, 1943, he was posthumously awarded the Medal of Honor.

== Biography ==
Van Voorhis was born on January 29, 1908, in Aberdeen, Washington, and grew up in Nevada. He was appointed to the United States Naval Academy in June 1925.

Following graduation from the Academy on June 6, 1929, Ensign Van Voorhis reported for duty aboard the battleship USS Mississippi (BB-41). That assignment lasted until November 1930, when he transferred to the Naval Air Station in Pensacola, Florida, for aviation training.

He received his wings on September 3, 1931, and was assigned to the USS Maryland as a member of Observation Squadron 4B (VO-4B). In June 1934, he transferred to Bombing Squadron 5B on board the aircraft carrier USS Ranger (CV-4), and soon thereafter, to VB-2B attached to USS Saratoga (CV-3). From July 1935 until May 1937, he served in the Panama Canal Zone and flew patrols from Coco Solo with Patrol Squadron 2F (VP-2F). The following June, Van Voorhis returned to carrier-based aviation and served first in USS Enterprise (CV-6), then in USS Yorktown (CV-5), and finally back to Enterprise. In June 1940, Van Voorhis joined the aviation unit assigned to the light cruiser USS Honolulu (CL-48) where he served for a year. In July 1941, he reported for duty at the Naval Air Station, Anacostia, where he served until November 1942.

In December 1942, Van Voorhis, a lieutenant commander since July, assumed command of VP-14, but soon thereafter took command of VB-102, which was equipped with the PB4Y-1, the naval version of the B-24 Liberator. While serving in that capacity, Van Voorhis was killed near Hare Island of the Kapingamarangi Atoll, the southernmost of the Eastern Caroline Islands. After a 700-mile (1,100 km) flight alone, Van Voorhis launched successive bombing and strafing attacks on the enemy ground installations. During his attack, he succeeded in destroying a radio station, anti-aircraft emplacements, and at least one airborne fighter as well as three others on the water. However, the strength of Japanese aerial opposition eventually forced him lower and lower until the anti-aircraft barrage, the fighters, or perhaps his own bomb blasts, caused the aircraft to crash. He was posthumously promoted to commander and awarded the Medal of Honor.

Van Voorhis is buried in the Jefferson Barracks National Cemetery in St. Louis County, Missouri. He has a headstone at Arlington National Cemetery which reads "In Memory of Bruce Van Voorhis".

== Awards and honors ==

Naval Aviator Badge
Medal of Honor	Purple Heart	American Defense Service Medal w/ Fleet Clasp (3/16" Bronze Star)
American Campaign Medal	Asiatic-Pacific Campaign Medal w/ one 3/16" Bronze Star	World War II Victory Medal

=== Medal of Honor citation ===
For conspicuous gallantry and intrepidity at the risk of his life above and beyond the call of duty as Squadron Commander of Bombing Squadron 102 and as Plane Commander of a PB4Y-I Patrol Bomber operating against the enemy on Japanese-held Kapingamarangi Atoll during the battle of the Solomon Islands, July 6, 1943. Fully aware of the limited chance of surviving an urgent mission, voluntarily undertaken to prevent a surprise Japanese attack against our forces, Lt. Comdr. Van Voorhis took off in total darkness on a perilous 700-mile flight without escort or support. Successful in reaching his objective despite treacherous and varying winds, low visibility and difficult terrain, he fought a lone but relentless battle under fierce antiaircraft fire and overwhelming aerial opposition. Forced lower and lower by pursuing planes, he coolly persisted in his mission of destruction. Abandoning all chance of a safe return he executed 6 bold ground-level attacks to demolish the enemy's vital radio station, installations, antiaircraft guns and crews with bombs and machine gun fire, and to destroy 1 fighter plane in the air and 3 on the water. Caught in his own bomb blast, Lt. Comdr. Van Voorhis crashed into the lagoon off the beach, sacrificing himself in a single-handed fight against almost insuperable odds, to make a distinctive contribution to our continued offensive in driving the Japanese from the Solomons and, by his superb daring, courage and resoluteness of purpose, enhanced the finest traditions of the U.S. Naval Service. He gallantly gave his life for his country.

=== Namesakes and honors ===
The U.S. Navy Dealey-class destroyer escort USS Van Voorhis (DE-1028) was named in honor of LCDR Van Voorhis. The Van Voorhis was commissioned on April 22, 1957; she was decommissioned on July 1, 1972.

The airfield at Naval Air Station Fallon is also named in his honor.

There is also a United States Naval Sea Cadet Corps unit under his name the Van Voorhis squadron in Las Vegas, Nevada.

== See also ==
- Daniel Van Voorhis
- List of Medal of Honor recipients
