= Daniel Van Voorhis =

US Army general (1878–1956)

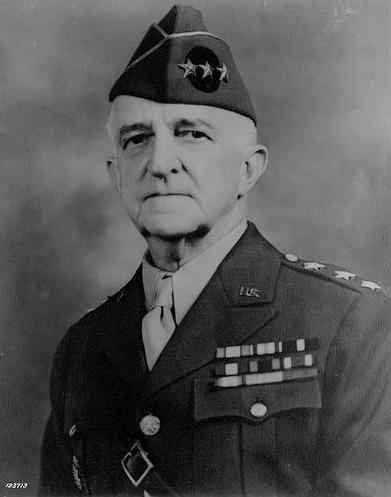
- Born: October 24, 1878; Zanesville, Ohio
- Died: January 9, 1956 (aged 77); Washington, D.C.
- Burial place: Greenwood Cemetery, Zanesville, Ohio
- Military career
- Allegiance: United States of America
- Branch: United States Army
- Service years: 1898–1942
- Rank: Lieutenant general
- Commands: 16th Cavalry Regiment; 7th Cavalry Brigade (Mechanized); Caribbean Defense Command; V Corps Area
- Conflicts: Spanish–American War; World War I; World War II
- Awards: Navy Cross; Distinguished Service Medal; Silver Star; Legion of Merit

Daniel Van Voorhis (October 24, 1878 – January 9, 1956) was a United States Army lieutenant general and was noteworthy for his assignments as commander of V Corps and the Caribbean Defense Command, as well as his efforts in creating the Army's modern armor branch.

== Early life ==
The son of Congressman Henry Clay Van Voorhis, he was born on October 24, 1878, in Zanesville, Muskingum County, Ohio. He attended Ohio Wesleyan University and Pennsylvania's Washington and Jefferson College, where he was a member of the Phi Kappa Psi fraternity.

== Start of military career ==
Van Voorhis left college to enlist for the Spanish–American War as a corporal in the 10th Pennsylvania Infantry Regiment. He attained the rank of captain before the end of the war, and earned the Silver Star Citation (which was converted to the Silver Star decoration in 1932) for heroism at Jaro in the Philippines.

After the Spanish–American War Van Voorhis accepted a commission as a second lieutenant in the Regular Army and served primarily in the Philippines between 1900 and 1914. In 1909 he was appointed as aide-de-camp to President William Howard Taft. In 1914 he served on the Texas border during the Pancho Villa Expedition.

== World War I ==
At the beginning of World War I he was Chief of Staff at the Newport News, Virginia port of embarkation, and was one of only twelve Army officers to earn the Navy Cross. In 1918 he went to France as a member of the American Expeditionary Force staff and, after the war was assigned to the port of Brest, where he was responsible for coordinating the A.E.F's return to the United States, for which he received the Distinguished Service Medal.

== Post–World War I ==
Following World War I Van Voorhis served in Texas as commander of the 16th Cavalry Regiment, assistant chief of staff of 2nd Cavalry Division, and assistant chief of staff of VIII Corps. In 1924 he was assigned as executive officer to the Chief of Cavalry, and in 1929 he graduated from the Army War College.

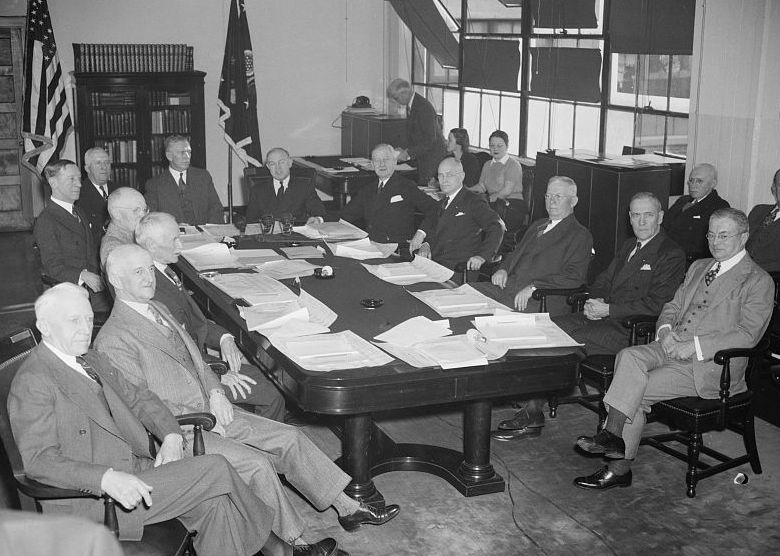
Army and corps area commanders meet with Secretary of War and Chief of Staff in Washington, D.C., Dec. 1, 1939 to plan intensive training of the army for the next six months. Major General Daniel Van Voorhis, commanding the Fifth Corps Area, is sat second on the left.

In 1930 Van Voorhis was appointed to command the Army's new experimental mechanized force, first called the 1st Cavalry Regiment (Mechanized), and later the 7th Cavalry Brigade (Mechanized), receiving promotion to brigadier general. The organization he created and the tactics he developed were vital to the Army's transformation into the modern, mobile armor and mechanized infantry force that was successful in World War II, and with Adna R. Chaffee Jr. he is recognized as a founder of the Army's Armor branch.

General Van Voorhis served as chief of staff for the Hawaiian Division from 1934 to 1936. He succeeded Guy V. Henry as commander of Fort Knox in 1936 following Henry's retirement.

In July 1938 General Van Voorhis was promoted to major general and became commander of Fifth Corps Area, with its headquarters in Columbus, Ohio, in October of the same year. In October 1939 he was named to become the head of the soon to be activated Caribbean Defense Command (CDC) in Panama. Van Voorhis was promoted to the rank of lieutenant general in July 1940. On May 8, 1941 the CDC was activated.

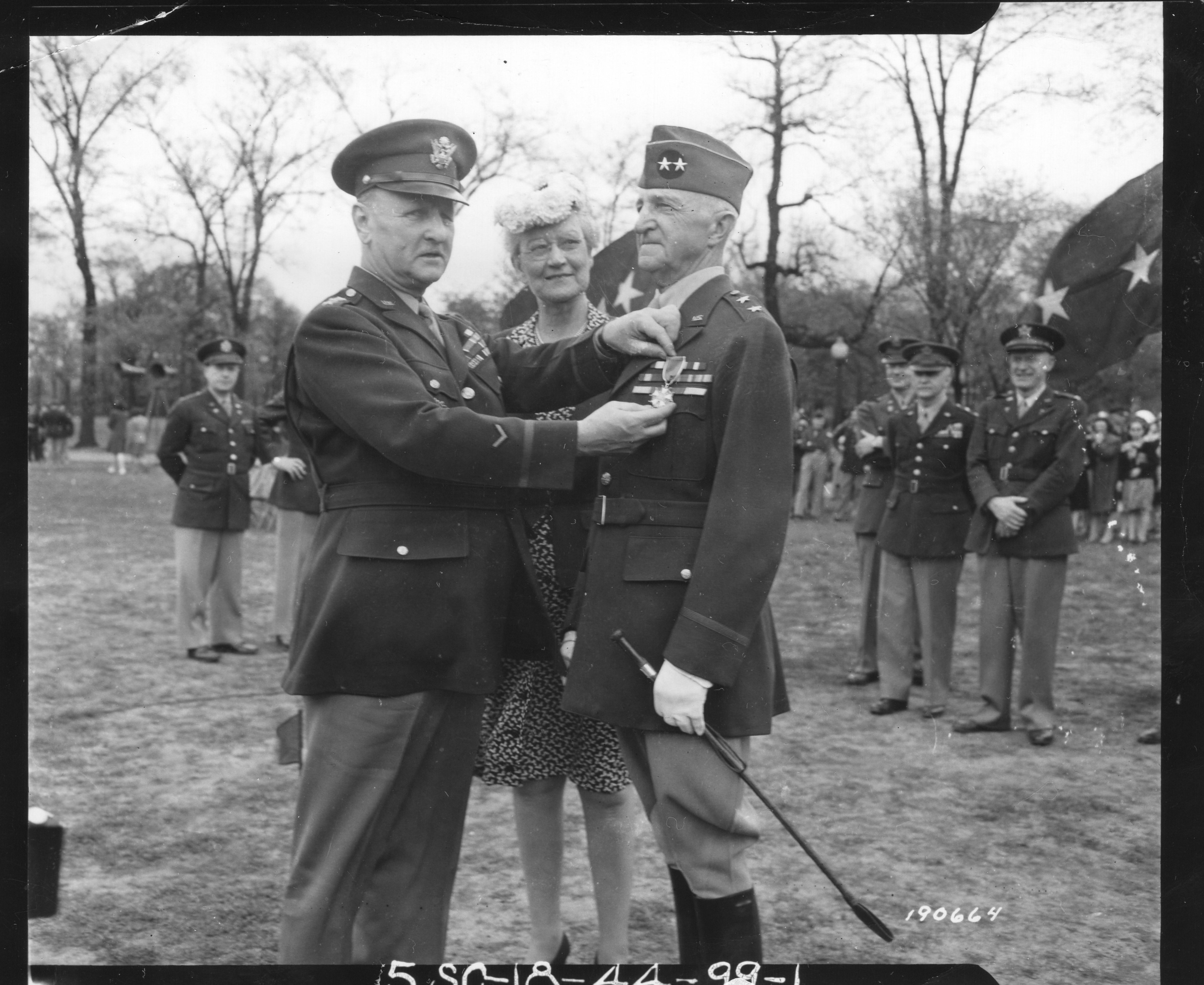
Lieutenant General George Grunert pins the Legion of Merit on Major General Daniel Van Voorhis at Fort Hayes, Ohio, May 1944.

In September 1941 Van Voorhis was administratively reduced in rank to major general and reassigned as commander of Fifth Corps Area, where he remained until reaching the mandatory retirement age of 64 in October 1942. He received the Legion of Merit as a retirement award in 1944.

== Retirement and death ==
In retirement he resided in Zanesville, Ohio, and Clearwater, Florida. General Van Voorhis died at Walter Reed Army Hospital in Washington, D.C. on January 9, 1956, and was buried in Zanesville's Greenwood Cemetery. His papers, the Daniel Van Voorhis Collection, are part of the Patton Museum at Fort Knox, Kentucky, and an elementary school as well as the largest residential housing area at Fort Knox is named for him.

== Decorations and medals ==
- Navy Cross
- Distinguished Service Medal
- Silver Star
- Legion of Merit
- Spanish War Service Medal
- Philippine Campaign Medal
- Mexican Border Service Medal
- World War I Victory Medal
- American Defense Service Medal with "Foreign Service" clasp
- American Campaign Medal
- World War II Victory Medal

Citation of Navy Cross:

Name: Van Voorhis, Daniel Rank: Colonel, U.S. Army Place of Service: Port of Embarkation, Newport News, Virginia Date: World War I Era

The Navy Cross is awarded to Daniel Van Voorhis, Colonel, United States Army, for distinguished service in the line of his profession as Chief of Staff to the Commanding General, Port of Embarkation, Newport News, Va.

Citation of Distinguished Service Medal:

Name: Van Voorhis, Daniel Service: Army Rank: Colonel War Department, General Orders No. 69 (1919)

The President of the United States of America, authorized by Act of Congress, July 9, 1918, takes pleasure in presenting the Army Distinguished Service Medal to Colonel (Cavalry) Daniel Van Voorhis, United States Army, for exceptionally meritorious and distinguished services to the Government of the United States, in a duty of great responsibility during World War I. As Chief of Staff at the Port of Embarkation, Newport News, Virginia, Colonel Van Voorhis' services in governing and controlling the Troop Movement Branch at the Port of Embarkation materially aided in the efficient transport of troops and supplies overseas.

== Dates of rank ==
No pin insignia in 1898	Corporal, Volunteer Army: May 11, 1898
	Captain, Volunteer Army: May 27, 1898 (Discharged October 31, 1899)
No pin insignia in 1900	Second lieutenant, United States Army: March 14, 1900
	First lieutenant, United States Army: February 2, 1901
	Captain, United States Army: August 7, 1909
	Major, National Army: July 14, 1917
	Lieutenant colonel, National Army: August 5, 1917
	Colonel, Temporary: August 15, 1918
	Lieutenant colonel, Regular Army: July 1, 1920
	Colonel, Regular Army: January 25, 1928
	Brigadier general, Regular Army: February 14, 1936
	Major general, Regular Army: July 1, 1938
	Lieutenant general, Temporary: July 31, 1940
	Major general, Regular Army: September 18, 1941 (retired October 21, 1942)

== See also ==
- Bruce Van Voorhis
