= Daniel S. Voorhees =

American porter

- Born: Dan Summe Voorhees; 9 January 1914
- Died: 28 July 1953

Daniel S. Voorhees (1914 – 1953) was a transient restaurant porter who confessed to the murder of Elizabeth Short on January 28, 1947. He asked members of the Los Angeles Police Department to meet him in downtown Los Angeles, at 4th Street and Hill Street. Voorhees was eliminated as a suspect in the Black Dahlia slaying because his handwriting did not match that in the killer's note, and after he refused to give any details and his testimony was proven false.

Voorhees was just one of around 500 people who came forward claiming to have killed Elizabeth Short after the case gained notoriety in the national press, some did seeking fame while others did because of mental illness, with Voorhees falling into both categories.

== Background ==
Daniel S. Voorhees was an Army veteran who served during World War II from Phoenix, Arizona, United States of America where he had a wife and 9-year-old daughter who were contacted by the Phoenix Police Department at the request of the LAPD; he also had a criminal record in Phoenix for petty crimes.

Voorhees had been working as a porter in a Los Angeles hotel when he called the police to confess to Short's murder citing a guilty conscience.

After confessing, Voorhees spent the night in the Los Angeles County Jail after he told LAPD detective E.R. Barrett that he met with Elizabeth Short on Hill Street two weeks earlier. He claimed to have taken her for a ride on a Wilshire Boulevard bus. He did not say where the two of them went or whether they saw one another later. A police psychiatrist, Dr. Paul De River, delayed a lie detector test on Voorhees until he recovered from what was described as a "befuddled and bewildered" state. Voorhees said that he met Short in 1941 and dated her several times. He refused to say where he met Short on these occasions and police investigators established that when Voorhees claimed to have met Short she was a teenager living on the East Coast and so he was dismissed as an attention-seeker. Indeed, contemporary FBI and police memorandums note that Voorhees was just seeking fame and was mentally ill.

== Disappearance and death ==
Voorhees went missing sometime after January 28, 1947. On the day Short's body was discovered, January 15, Voorhees registered at a hotel at 1012 East Seventh Street in Los Angeles, at 10:45 A.M. He checked out of the hotel on the morning of January 16. The hotel owner stated that he had not seen Voorhees after this date and he was not tracked down any further by the police who had dismissed him as a suspect by this point. He was found again, but died of lung cancer on July 28, 1953.

== See also ==
- List of people who disappeared mysteriously: pre-1970
