= Donald E. Voorhees =

American politician (1930–2001)

Member of the Iowa House of Representatives
- In office 1967–1971

Personal details
- Born: September 8, 1930 Winfield, Kansas, United States
- Died: May 16, 2001 (aged 70) Newland, North Carolina, United States
- Resting place: Calvary Cemetery, Wichita, Kansas
- Party: Republican
- Spouse: Laurene Chambers
- Children: 4
- Occupation: Business relations

Donald Edwin Voorhees (September 8, 1930 – May 16, 2001) was an American politician in the state of Iowa.

Voorhees was born in Winfield, Kansas. He attended St. John's College in Winfield and was a medical representative. He served in the Iowa House of Representatives from 1967 to 1971 as a Republican, representing Black Hawk County, Iowa. He died in 2001.

His son, Donald Voorhees Jr., was sexually assaulted by John Wayne Gacy in 1967. Gacy served a prison term for this assault and later killed over 30 boys and young men.
