= USS Van Voorhis =

Dealey-class destroyer escort

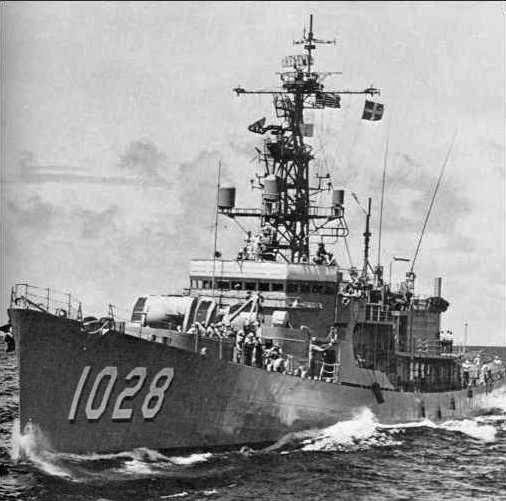
- USS Van Voorhis (DE-1028)

History

United States
- Name: USS Van Voorhis
- Namesake: Bruce Van Voorhis
- Builder: New York Shipbuilding Company
- Laid down: 29 August 1955
- Launched: 28 July 1956
- Commissioned: 22 April 1957
- Decommissioned: 1 July 1972
- Stricken: 1 July 1972
- Fate: Sold for scrap, 15 June 1973

General characteristics
- Class & type: Dealey-class destroyer escort
- Displacement: 1,877 long tons (1,907 t) full load
- Length: 314 ft 6 in (95.86 m)
- Beam: 36 ft 9 in (11.20 m)
- Draft: 18 ft (5.5 m)
- Propulsion: 2 × Foster-Wheeler boilers; 1 × De Laval geared turbine; 20,000 shp (15 MW); 1 shaft
- Speed: 27 knots (31 mph; 50 km/h)
- Range: 6,000 nmi (11,000 km) at 12 kn (14 mph; 22 km/h)
- Complement: 170
- Armament: 4 × 3-inch/50 caliber guns; 1 × Hedgehog ASW mortar; 6 × 324 mm (12.8 in) Mark 32 torpedo tubes; Mark 46 torpedoes

USS Van Voorhis (DE-1028) was a Dealey-class destroyer escort, was a ship of the United States Navy named for Commander Bruce Van Voorhis (1908–1942), a naval aviator who was awarded the Medal of Honor posthumously for action in the Eastern Caroline Islands.

Van Voorhis was laid down on 29 August 1955 at the New York Shipbuilding Company in Camden, New Jersey; launched on 28 July 1956, sponsored by Mrs. Kathryn Van Voorhis, the widow of Cmdr. Van Voorhis; and commissioned at Philadelphia, Pennsylvania, on 22 April 1957.

== Service history ==
=== 1950s ===
Following shakedown training near Guantanamo Bay, Cuba, during the summer, Van Voorhis reported at Newport, Rhode Island, for duty with Escort Squadron 14 (CortRon 14). The destroyer escort conducted operations along the east coast of North America until May 1958 when she sailed across the Atlantic for a cruise with the 6th Fleet. While operating with other ships of the 6th Fleet near Crete, she was ordered to the eastern end of the Mediterranean in mid-July to patrol off the Levantine coast. She supported the Marines who landed in Lebanon in response to President Camille Chamoun's request for help during a crisis precipitated by Arab nationalist factions in reaction to his administration's pro-Western policies and its adherence to the Eisenhower Doctrine. President Dwight D. Eisenhower's personal representative Robert D. Murphy helped the factions to negotiate a settlement which resulted in the election of General Fuad Chehab to the presidency on 31 July. President Chamoun's refusal to yield office before the expiration of his term kept the country in turmoil until late September. However, political conditions in Lebanon remained highly volatile, so American forces remained there until after General Chehab took office in September. During this period, Van Voorhis alternated normal 6th Fleet operations with patrols off Lebanon. Late in September, the warship departed the Mediterranean and returned to Newport early in October.

=== 1960s ===
Upon her return, the warship operated along the east coast until February 1959 when she joined the other ships of her squadron in a three-month cruise to South America. She re-entered Newport late in April and resumed local operations once more. She continued that employment through June 1960. The following month, she departed the United States for duty in the eastern Atlantic. During that six-week cruise, Van Voorhis joined other Navy ships and units of Allied navies in a NATO exercise. She also visited Greenwich, England, and Greenock, Scotland, before returning to Newport where, after upkeep, she resumed anti-submarine warfare operations. She remained so occupied through the remainder of 1960. Over the following two years, the destroyer escort continued the routine of summer operations out of Newport and winter training in the West Indies. In the autumn of 1962, when the United States subjected Cuba to a quarantine in order to keep offensive missiles from the strategically situated island, Van Voorhis moved to Mayport, Florida, to support the blockade-type operation. After spending the last week of the quarantine in Mayport, she returned north without having actually participated in the operation.

In December, the warship began preparations for another overseas deployment. On 15 February 1963, she cleared port for a three-month goodwill cruise to Africa—"Solant Amity IV." During the first half of the cruise, she moved south, along the western coast of Africa, and called at Monrovia, Liberia; Lagos, Nigeria; Pointe Noiro, Congo; and Cape Town, South Africa. After rounding the Cape of Good Hope, she moved north, up the eastern coast of Africa, and visited Lourenco Marques, Mozambique; Diego Suarez, Malagasy Republic; and Mombasa, Kenya. She continued north to Aden, transited the Red Sea and the Suez Canal and entered the Mediterranean on 1 May. During the first two weeks of May, Van Voorhis crossed the Mediterranean making liberty calls at Athens, Naples, and Barcelona along the way. She rounded out the voyage with one-day stops at Gibraltar and the Azores, and re-entered Newport on 24 May.

Following upkeep, she conducted ASW exercises in July and made a midshipman cruise to Bermuda. Additional ASW training off the Florida coast ensued before the ship returned to Newport in October. For the remainder of 1963 and throughout 1964, the destroyer escort operated along the eastern seaboard. On 8 August 1964, she was reassigned to Escort Squadron 8 (CortRon 8) as the squadron flagship. She continued ASW training exercises through 1964 and during the first part of January 1965.

During the latter part of the month, the ship entered the Boston Naval Shipyard for a six-week availability during which she received control equipment associated with the Drone Antisubmarine Helicopter (DASH) system. The installation was completed early in March, and Van Voorhis departed Boston on the 9th to participate in the annual "Springboard" exercises conducted in the Caribbean. Upon completion of that assignment, Van Voorhis returned north to receive her DASH helicopters. She arrived in Norfolk on 29 March and began three weeks of tests and qualifications with the DASH system. The first destroyer escort to receive DASH, Van Voorhis completed her qualification trials in April and returned to her home port on 21 April.

The ship continued to work out of Newport through the following four and one-half years, primarily conducting operations in the western Atlantic. She sharpened her anti-submarine warfare skills constantly as she participated in numerous exercises along the entire North American coastline and in the Caribbean.

In August 1966, Van Voorhis rendezvoused with the destroyer escort Hammerberg, guided missile frigate Leahy, and submarine Requin off Trinidad to participate in Operation "Unitas VII" through November. In 1966 and 1967, the warship made cruises around South America in which she visited a number of South American ports and participated in bilateral and multi-lateral exercises with warships of various South American countries. During the first five months of 1969, her sphere of operations was centered around Florida and the West Indies. In June, she returned to Newport for a short time before resuming operations in the Caribbean in July. Through the fall and winter of 1969, she alternated between Newport and the Fleet Sonar School at Key West, Florida.

=== 1970–1971 and fate ===
In January 1970, Van Voorhis began preparations for conversion to a research and development platform to test the Interim Towed Array Surveillance System (ITASS). Late that month, her DASH equipment was removed to make room for the ITASS submarine detection gear. On 9 February, she entered the Bethlehem Steel Shipyards in East Boston to begin the actual conversion. Over the next month, her new equipment was installed, and her DASH hangar was modified to provide a berthing area for the additional crew members necessitated by the ITASS. Van Voorhis completed the conversion early in March and, for the next four months, she conducted a series of tests on the experimental equipment in the vicinity of Guantanamo Bay, then in the Tongue of the ocean off Eleuthera in the Bahamas.

From late June to late August, she prepared to deploy to the Mediterranean. She departed Newport on 26 August 1970, passed through the Straits of Gibraltar on 6 September, and arrived at Naples on 9 September. The destroyer escort operated with the 6th Fleet, conducting surveillance patrols with her new ITASS gear until near the end of November. During the intervening two months, she also called at such places as Barcelona, Mallorca, Crete, and Naples. On 17 November, she turned the 6th Fleet ITASS responsibility over to her relief, the destroyer escort Lester. After a liberty call at Palma de Mallorca and change of operational control at Rota, Spain, Van Voorhis set out to recross the Atlantic on 26 November and arrived in Newport on 6 December.

Van Voorhis began 1971 in port at Newport and operated from that base during the first eight months of the year. In September, the warship underwent an inspection and survey which found her to be unfit for further naval service. She remained moored at Newport until the following summer. Van Voorhis was decommissioned on 1 July 1972, and her name was struck from the Navy list simultaneously. On 15 June 1973, she was sold to the Union Minerals and Alloys Corporation, of New York City, and was subsequently scrapped.
