= Garrett Township, Douglas County, Illinois =

Garrett Township
- Township
- Location in Douglas County

- Douglas County's location in Illinois
- Coordinates: 39°49′15″N 88°23′57″W
- Country: United States
- State: Illinois
- County: Douglas
- Established: November 5, 1867

Area
  - Total: 52.32 sq mi (135.5 km^{2})
  - Land: 52.20 sq mi (135.2 km^{2})
  - Water: 0.13 sq mi (0.34 km^{2}) 0.24%
- Elevation: 669 ft (204 m)

Population (2020)
  - Total: 1,292
  - Density: 24.75/sq mi (9.556/km^{2})
- Time zone: UTC-6 (CST)
  - Summer (DST): UTC-5 (CDT)
- ZIP codes: 61872, 61911, 61913, 61953
- FIPS code: 17-041-28755

Garrett Township is one of nine townships in Douglas County, Illinois, USA. As of the 2020 census, its population was 1,292 and it contained 579 housing units.

== Geography ==
According to the 2021 census gazetteer files, Garrett Township has a total area of 52.32 square miles (135.51 km^{2}), of which 52.20 square miles (135.20 km^{2}) (or 99.76%) is land and 0.13 square miles (0.34 km^{2}) (or 0.24%) is water.

=== Cities, towns, villages ===
- Atwood (east side)
- Garrett

=== Unincorporated towns ===
- Chicken Bristle at 39.836143°N 88.366719°W
- Ficklin at 39.798643°N 88.355329°W

=== Cemeteries ===
The township contains these four cemeteries: Lewis, Lower Lester, Taylor and Upper Lester.

=== Major highways ===
- U.S. Route 36

=== Airports and landing strips ===
- Bragg Landing Strip
- Cooch Landing Area
- Kamm Airport

== Demographics ==
As of the 2020 census there were 1,292 people, 482 households, and 366 families residing in the township. The population density was 24.69 inhabitants per square mile (9.53/km^{2}). There were 579 housing units at an average density of 11.07 per square mile (4.27/km^{2}). The racial makeup of the township was 96.75% White, 0.08% African American, 0.08% Native American, 0.08% Asian, 0.08% Pacific Islander, 0.46% from other races, and 2.48% from two or more races. Hispanic or Latino of any race were 1.63% of the population.

There were 482 households, out of which 31.50% had children under the age of 18 living with them, 64.11% were married couples living together, 10.58% had a female householder with no spouse present, and 24.07% were non-families. 21.20% of all households were made up of individuals, and 13.30% had someone living alone who was 65 years of age or older. The average household size was 2.59 and the average family size was 2.96.

The township's age distribution consisted of 29.4% under the age of 18, 4.9% from 18 to 24, 22.8% from 25 to 44, 28% from 45 to 64, and 14.8% who were 65 years of age or older. The median age was 40.8 years. For every 100 females, there were 87.5 males. For every 100 females age 18 and over, there were 94.3 males.

The median income for a household in the township was $56,042, and the median income for a family was $65,556. Males had a median income of $52,574 versus $29,886 for females. The per capita income for the township was $31,635. About 10.9% of families and 13.3% of the population were below the poverty line, including 21.8% of those under age 18 and 13.0% of those age 65 or over.

Historical population
Census	Pop.	Note	%±
1930	1,587		—
1940	1,498		−5.6%
1950	1,404		−6.3%
1960	1,512		7.7%
1970	1,439		−4.8%
1980	1,519		5.6%
1990	1,446		−4.8%
2000	1,440		−0.4%
2010	1,441		0.1%
2020	1,292		−10.3%
U.S. Decennial Census

== School districts ==
- Atwood-Hammond Community Unit School District 39
- Tuscola Community Unit School District 301

== Political districts ==
- State House District 110
- State Senate District 55
