= Murdock Township =

Murdock Township may refer to the following townships in the United States:

- Murdock Township, Douglas County, Illinois
- Murdock Township, Butler County, Kansas
