= Arcola Township, Douglas County, Illinois =

Arcola Township
- Township
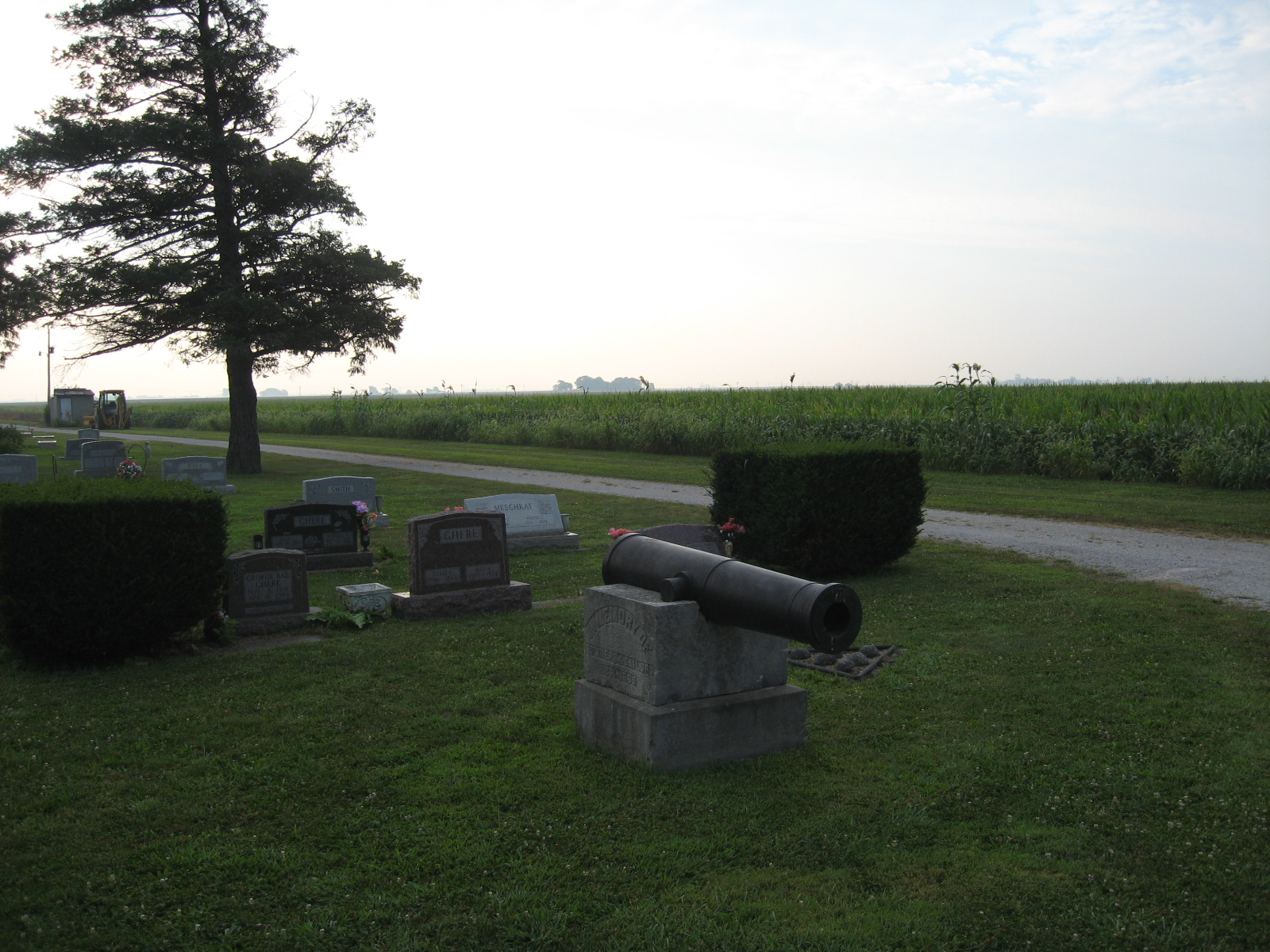
- Arcola Township Cemetery

- Location in Douglas County

- Douglas County's location in Illinois
- Coordinates: 39°42′21″N 88°17′18″W
- Country: United States
- State: Illinois
- County: Douglas
- Established: November 5, 1867

Area
  - Total: 53.78 sq mi (139.3 km^{2})
  - Land: 53.67 sq mi (139.0 km^{2})
  - Water: 0.12 sq mi (0.31 km^{2}) 0.21%
- Elevation: 650 ft (198 m)

Population (2020)
  - Total: 3,257
  - Density: 60.69/sq mi (23.43/km^{2})
- Time zone: UTC-6 (CST)
  - Summer (DST): UTC-5 (CDT)
- ZIP codes: 61910, 61953
- FIPS code: 17-041-01894

Arcola Township is one of nine townships in Douglas County, Illinois, USA. As of the 2020 census, its population was 3,257 and it contained 1,316 housing units.

== Geography ==
According to the 2021 census gazetteer files, Arcola Township has a total area of 53.78 square miles (139.29 km^{2}), of which 53.67 square miles (139.00 km^{2}) (or 99.79%) is land and 0.12 square miles (0.31 km^{2}) (or 0.21%) is water.

=== Cities, towns, villages ===
- Arcola

=== Unincorporated towns ===
- Filson at 39.6894772°N 88.231989°W

=== Cemeteries ===
The township contains Township Cemetery.

=== Major highways ===
- Interstate 57
- U.S. Route 45
- Illinois Route 133

== Demographics ==
As of the 2020 census there were 3,257 people, 1,128 households, and 791 families residing in the township. The population density was 60.56 inhabitants per square mile (23.38/km^{2}). There were 1,316 housing units at an average density of 24.47 per square mile (9.45/km^{2}). The racial makeup of the township was 71.91% White, 0.28% African American, 0.58% Native American, 0.86% Asian, 0.03% Pacific Islander, 18.21% from other races, and 8.14% from two or more races. Hispanic or Latino of any race were 33.31% of the population.

There were 1,128 households, out of which 37.00% had children under the age of 18 living with them, 50.71% were married couples living together, 13.12% had a female householder with no spouse present, and 29.88% were non-families. 21.70% of all households were made up of individuals, and 13.60% had someone living alone who was 65 years of age or older. The average household size was 2.76 and the average family size was 3.20.

The township's age distribution consisted of 27.4% under the age of 18, 10.0% from 18 to 24, 25.9% from 25 to 44, 20.6% from 45 to 64, and 16.2% who were 65 years of age or older. The median age was 35.5 years. For every 100 females, there were 88.7 males. For every 100 females age 18 and over, there were 88.9 males.

The median income for a household in the township was $60,379, and the median income for a family was $59,009. Males had a median income of $42,313 versus $27,391 for females. The per capita income for the township was $25,362. About 9.6% of families and 11.3% of the population were below the poverty line, including 13.9% of those under age 18 and 17.6% of those age 65 or over.

Historical population
Census	Pop.	Note	%±
1930	2,849		—
1940	2,748		−3.5%
1950	2,595		−5.6%
1960	3,010		16.0%
1970	2,820		−6.3%
1980	3,219		14.1%
1990	3,132		−2.7%
2000	3,360		7.3%
2010	3,312		−1.4%
2020	3,257		−1.7%
U.S. Decennial Census

== School districts ==
- Arcola Consolidated Unit School District 306
- Tuscola Community Unit School District 301

== Political districts ==
- State House District 110
- State Senate District 55
