= Camargo Township, Douglas County, Illinois =

Camargo Township
- Township
- Location in Douglas County

- Douglas County's location in Illinois
- Coordinates: 39°49′31″N 88°10′02″W
- Country: United States
- State: Illinois
- County: Douglas
- Established: November 5, 1867

Area
  - Total: 38.65 sq mi (100.1 km^{2})
  - Land: 38.59 sq mi (99.9 km^{2})
  - Water: 0.07 sq mi (0.18 km^{2}) 0.17%
- Elevation: 669 ft (204 m)

Population (2020)
  - Total: 3,538
  - Density: 91.68/sq mi (35.40/km^{2})
- Time zone: UTC-6 (CST)
  - Summer (DST): UTC-5 (CDT)
- ZIP codes: 61919, 61953, 61956
- FIPS code: 17-041-10604

Camargo Township is one of nine townships in Douglas County, Illinois, USA. As of the 2020 census, its population was 3,538 and it contained 1,569 housing units.

== Geography ==
According to the 2021 census gazetteer files, Camargo Township has a total area of 38.65 square miles (100.10 km^{2}), of which 38.59 square miles (99.95 km^{2}) (or 99.83%) is land and 0.07 square miles (0.18 km^{2}) (or 0.17%) is water. The Embarras River flows through the township. The township contains Spring Lake.

=== Cities, towns, villages ===
- Camargo
- Villa Grove

=== Unincorporated towns ===
- Patterson Springs at 39.792255°N 88.192822°W

=== Cemeteries ===
The township contains these three cemeteries: Broadus, Hammett and Oak Ridge.

=== Major highways ===
- U.S. Route 36
- Illinois Route 130

== Demographics ==
As of the 2020 census there were 3,538 people, 1,480 households, and 962 families residing in the township. The population density was 91.53 inhabitants per square mile (35.34/km^{2}). There were 1,569 housing units at an average density of 40.59 per square mile (15.67/km^{2}). The racial makeup of the township was 93.02% White, 0.45% African American, 0.37% Native American, 0.23% Asian, 0.08% Pacific Islander, 0.88% from other races, and 4.97% from two or more races. Hispanic or Latino of any race were 2.54% of the population.

There were 1,480 households, out of which 28.50% had children under the age of 18 living with them, 54.12% were married couples living together, 5.74% had a female householder with no spouse present, and 35.00% were non-families. 28.30% of all households were made up of individuals, and 13.20% had someone living alone who was 65 years of age or older. The average household size was 2.35 and the average family size was 2.87.

The township's age distribution consisted of 19.0% under the age of 18, 8.7% from 18 to 24, 23.4% from 25 to 44, 28.5% from 45 to 64, and 20.3% who were 65 years of age or older. The median age was 43.8 years. For every 100 females, there were 103.2 males. For every 100 females age 18 and over, there were 95.6 males.

The median income for a household in the township was $56,833, and the median income for a family was $77,250. Males had a median income of $42,483 versus $27,269 for females. The per capita income for the township was $28,431. About 10.4% of families and 9.5% of the population were below the poverty line, including 13.3% of those under age 18 and 6.7% of those age 65 or over.

Historical population
Census	Pop.	Note	%±
1930	2,914		—
1940	2,872		−1.4%
1950	2,742		−4.5%
1960	3,034		10.6%
1970	3,333		9.9%
1980	3,591		7.7%
1990	3,716		3.5%
2000	3,653		−1.7%
2010	3,585		−1.9%
2020	3,538		−1.3%
U.S. Decennial Census

== School districts ==
- Tuscola Community Unit School District 301
- Villa Grove Community Unit School District 302

== Political districts ==
- State House District 110
- State Senate District 55
