= Bowdre Township, Douglas County, Illinois =

Bowdre Township
- Township
- Location in Douglas County

- Douglas County's location in Illinois
- Coordinates: 39°42′47″N 88°08′55″W
- Country: United States
- State: Illinois
- County: Douglas
- Established: November 5, 1867

Area
  - Total: 48.09 sq mi (124.6 km^{2})
  - Land: 48.08 sq mi (124.5 km^{2})
  - Water: 0.01 sq mi (0.026 km^{2}) 0.01%
- Elevation: 633 ft (193 m)

Population (2020)
  - Total: 620
  - Density: 13/sq mi (5.0/km^{2})
- Time zone: UTC-6 (CST)
  - Summer (DST): UTC-5 (CDT)
- ZIP codes: 61910, 61919, 61930, 61953
- FIPS code: 17-041-07497

Bowdre Township is one of nine townships in Douglas County, Illinois, USA. As of the 2020 census, its population was 620 and it contained 311 housing units. Its name was changed from Deer Creek to Bowdre on June 5, 1868.

== Geography ==
According to the 2021 census gazetteer files, Bowdre Township has a total area of 48.09 square miles (124.55 km^{2}), of which 48.08 square miles (124.53 km^{2}) (or 99.99%) is land and 0.01 square miles (0.03 km^{2}) (or 0.01%) is water.

=== Cities, towns, villages ===
- Hindsboro

=== Unincorporated towns ===
- Hugo at 39.753922°N 88.148930°W
- Kemp at 39.695589°N 88.185321°W

=== Cemeteries ===
The township contains these three cemeteries: Antioch, Gill and Van Voorhis.

=== Major highways ===
- Illinois Route 130
- Illinois Route 133

== Demographics ==
As of the 2020 census there were 620 people, 332 households, and 253 families residing in the township. The population density was 12.89 inhabitants per square mile (4.98/km^{2}). There were 311 housing units at an average density of 6.47 per square mile (2.50/km^{2}). The racial makeup of the township was 95.81% White, 0.00% African American, 0.00% Native American, 0.00% Asian, 0.00% Pacific Islander, 1.29% from other races, and 2.90% from two or more races. Hispanic or Latino of any race were 4.84% of the population.

There were 332 households, out of which 29.50% had children under the age of 18 living with them, 64.46% were married couples living together, 7.23% had a female householder with no spouse present, and 23.80% were non-families. 22.90% of all households were made up of individuals, and 10.20% had someone living alone who was 65 years of age or older. The average household size was 2.64 and the average family size was 3.07.

The township's age distribution consisted of 22.9% under the age of 18, 4.7% from 18 to 24, 18.9% from 25 to 44, 29.9% from 45 to 64, and 23.7% who were 65 years of age or older. The median age was 48.2 years. For every 100 females, there were 77.0 males. For every 100 females age 18 and over, there were 81.5 males.

The median income for a household in the township was $77,083, and the median income for a family was $88,942. Males had a median income of $47,330 versus $26,122 for females. The per capita income for the township was $33,842. About 1.6% of families and 2.7% of the population were below the poverty line, including none of those under age 18 and 1.4% of those age 65 or over.

Historical population
Census	Pop.	Note	%±
1930	1,454		—
1940	1,347		−7.4%
1950	1,122		−16.7%
1960	1,012		−9.8%
1970	968		−4.3%
1980	872		−9.9%
1990	811		−7.0%
2000	700		−13.7%
2010	668		−4.6%
2020	620		−7.2%
U.S. Decennial Census

== School districts ==
- Arcola Consolidated Unit School District 306
- Oakland Community Unit School District 5
- Tuscola Community Unit School District 301
- Villa Grove Community Unit School District 302

== Political districts ==
- State House District 110
- State Senate District 55
