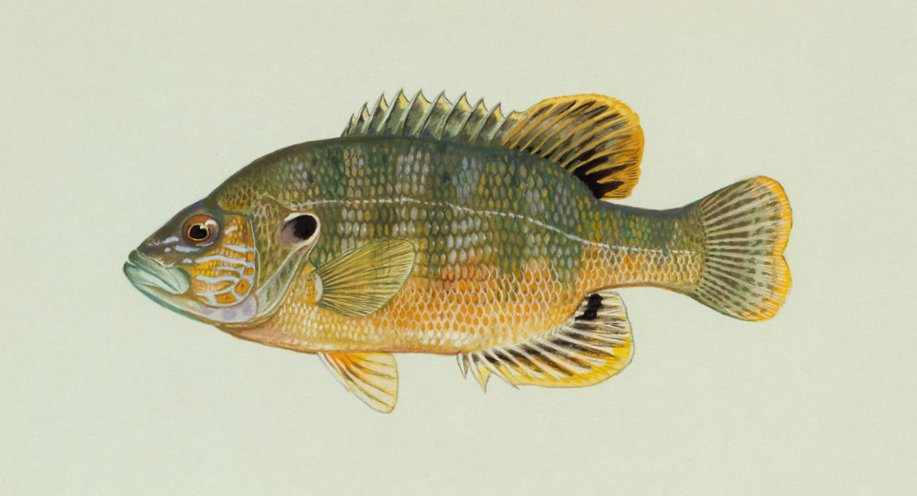

Conservation status
- Least Concern (IUCN 3.1)

- Secure (NatureServe)

Scientific classification
- Kingdom: Animalia
- Phylum: Chordata
- Class: Actinopterygii
- Division: Teleostei
- Order: Centrarchiformes
- Family: Centrarchidae
- Genus: Lepomis
- Species: L. cyanellus

Binomial name
- Lepomis cyanellus Rafinesque, 1819

= Green sunfish =

Species of fish

The green sunfish (Lepomis cyanellus) is a species of aggressive freshwater fish in the sunfish family (Centrarchidae) of order Centrarchiformes. The green sunfish does not always grow large enough to be an appealing target for anglers, but it is kept as an aquarium fish by hobbyists. They grow to be 3–6 inches (7.6–15.2 cm) long on average, but can achieve a length of 12 inches (30 cm).

== Etymology ==
The generic name Lepomis derives from the Greek λεπίς (scale) and πώμα (cover, plug, operculum). The specific epithet, cyanellus, derives from the Greek κυανός (blue).

== Geographic distribution ==
The green sunfish is native to a wide area of North America, from the Rocky Mountains in the west to the Appalachian Mountains in the east and from the Hudson Bay basin in Canada to the Gulf Coast in the United States and northern Mexico. They are specifically indigenous to a number of lakes and rivers, such as the Great Lakes and some of the basins of the Mississippi River.

Green sunfish have been introduced to many bodies of water all across the United States. The green sunfish is considered an invasive species by the states of Arizona, California, Florida, Georgia and New Jersey, with unconfirmed presence in Vermont and New Hampshire, namely the Connecticut River and its tributaries. Their invasive potential is due in part to their penchant for chasing other sunfish away from mutually preferred habitat of submerged vegetation, a form of interference competition, their relatively large mouth, high fecundity and ability to tolerate sediment pollution. In the state of New Jersey, as of 2021, anglers must destroy green sunfish when caught and should report their catch to a state fisheries biologist. In the state of Florida, a permit is required in order to possess green sunfish as it is listed as a prohibited non-native species there. L. cyanellus has been transplanted to countries in Africa, Asia, and Europe, and has become established in some areas.

A green sunfish from the Russian River in California

== Description ==
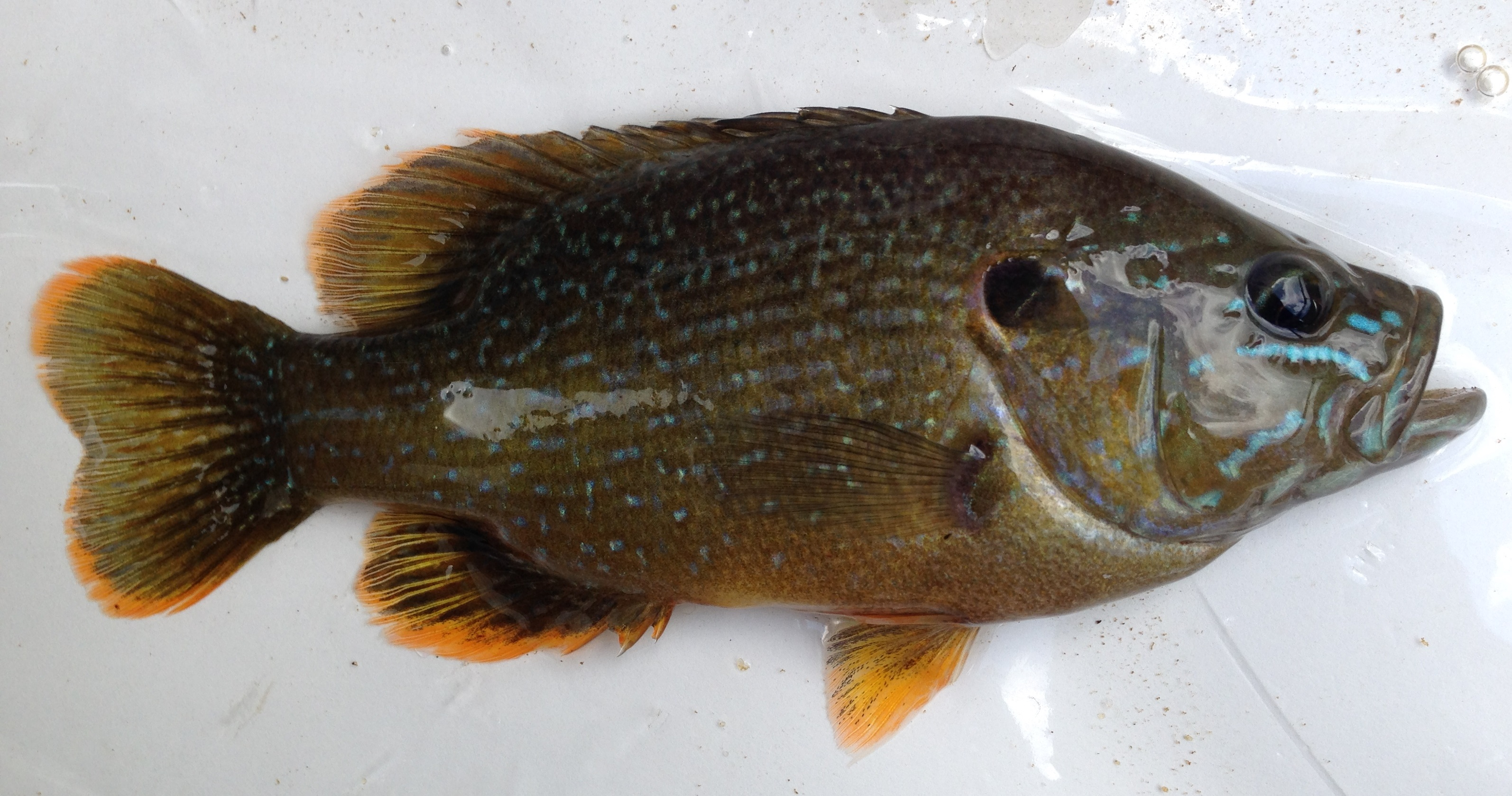
Adult green sunfish

The green sunfish is blue-green in color on its back and sides with yellow-flecked bony-ridged (ctenoid) scales, as well as yellow coloration on the ventral sides. The gill covers and sides of head have broken bright blue stripes, causing some to mistakenly confuse them with bluegill. They also have a dark spot located near the back end of the dorsal fin, the base of the anal fin and on the opercular flap. The margins of the soft-rayed portion of the dorsal fin, the caudal fin, the ventral fins and the anal fin are orange or yellow, most pronounced in individuals during breeding periods. L. cyanellus has a relatively big mouth and long snout that extends to beneath the middle of the eye. Its pectoral fins are short with rounded edges containing 13 to 15 pectoral fin rays, a dorsal fin with about 10 dorsal spines followed by 10 to 12 rays and a homocercal tail. The typical length ranges from about 3–7 in and the fish usually weighs less than a pound. The green sunfish reaches a maximum recorded length of about 30 cm (12 in), with a maximum recorded weight of 960 g (2.12 lb). Identification of sunfish species from one another can sometimes be difficult as these species frequently hybridize.

== Habitat ==
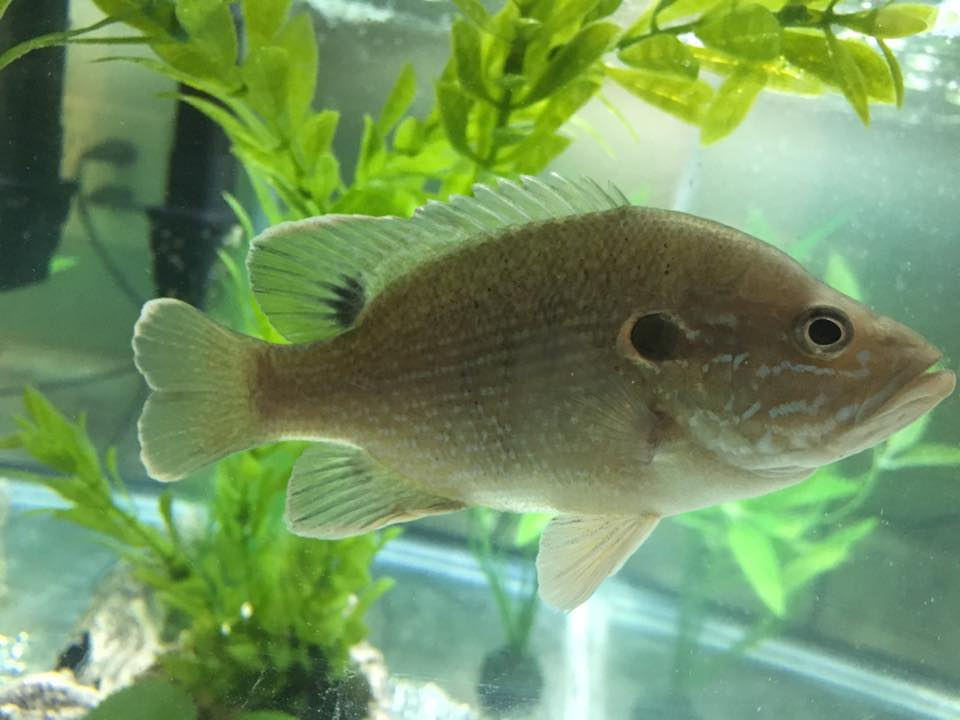
Green sunfish from Walnut Point State Park, east-central Illinois

The species prefers areas in sluggish backwaters, lakes, and ponds with gravel, sand, or bedrock bottoms. They also can be found in very muddy waters and are able to tolerate poor water conditions. Green sunfish tend to spend their time hiding around rocks, submerged logs, plants, and other things that provide cover.

== Diet ==
Its diet can include aquatic insects and larvae, insects that fall into the water, crayfish, snails, other molluscs, turtle food, frogs, some small fish, fish eggs, bryozoans, zooplankton, other small invertebrates, and sometimes plant material. They are omnivores.

== Reproduction ==
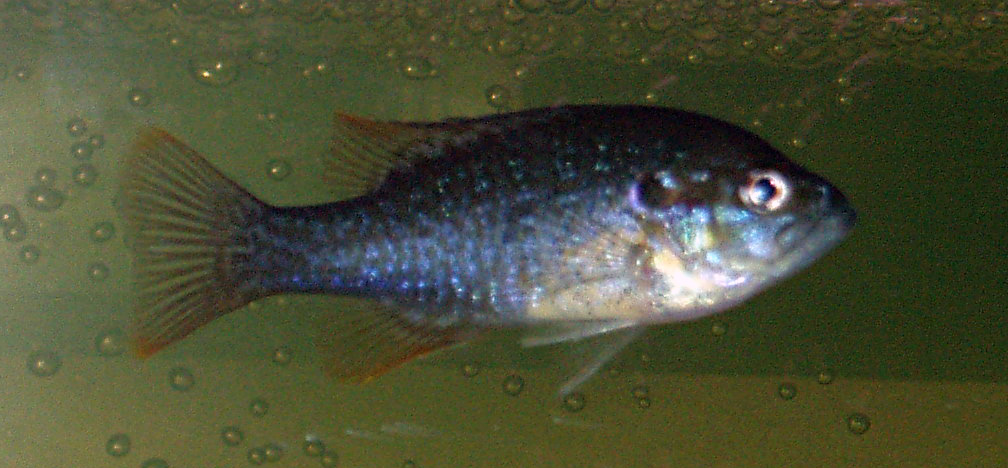
A juvenile green sunfish

Green sunfish begin spawning in the summer with the exact time varying with location and water temperature. When they do spawn, the males create nests in shallow water by clearing depressions in the bottom, often near a type of shelter such as rocks or submerged logs. The male defends his nest from other males using visual displays and physical force when necessary. On occasion, simply constructing a nest is sufficient for the male to attract a mate, but when it is not he will court a female with grunts and lead her to his nest.

They continue their courtship dance, swimming with each other around the nest until the female descends to deposit her eggs in the nest. The female will lay 2,000 to 26,000 eggs and leave them for the male to guard. He keeps watch over them until they hatch in three to five days, while protecting them and fanning them with his fins, keeping them clean and providing them with oxygenated water. When they hatch, the fry remain near the nest for a few days, then leave to feed and fend for themselves. After the eggs have hatched, the male will often seek to attract another female to lay her eggs in his nest. Lepomis cyanellus typically live between four and six years in the wild.

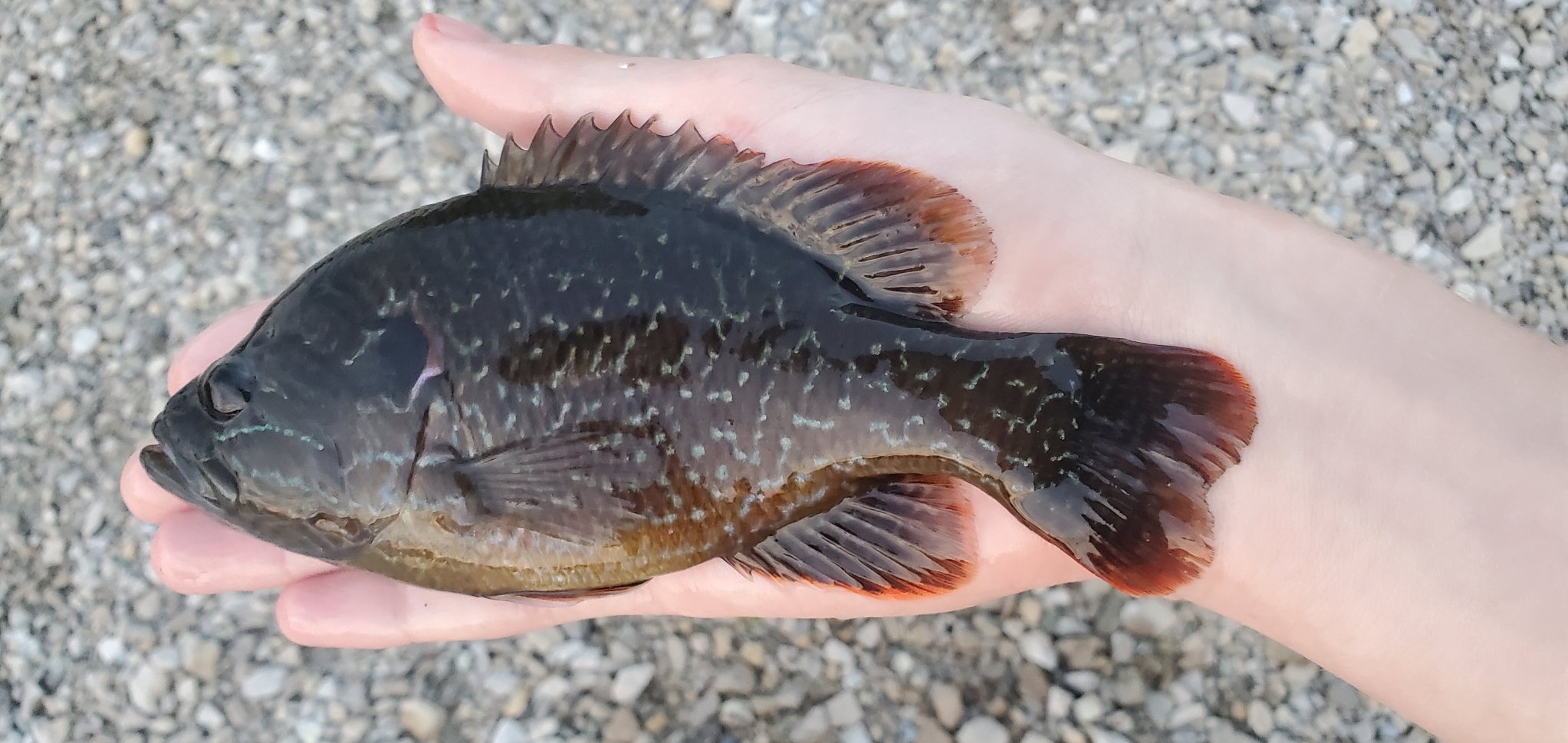
Green sunfish × warmouth hybrid

Green sunfish tend to nest in areas close to other green sunfish, as well as other species of sunfish. Due to the close proximity of multiple nests, a green sunfish female may deposit some of her eggs into the nest of a male of a different species. This in turn leads to the next generation containing some amount of hybrids. These green sunfish hybrids will often look like a combination of their parents, often making it difficult to distinguish one species from another.

== Anatomy and physiology ==
The retina of the green sunfish includes a mosaic of cone cells and double cone cells in a regular arrangement. The green sunfish has been theorized to have vision that is sensitive to the polarization of light, which could enhance visibility of targets in scattering media if a processing technique called polarization difference imaging is employed by the fish. Experimental evidence, however, suggests that green sunfish are not able to visually discriminate on the basis of light polarization. Thus, the function of the green sunfish's retinal patterning is not known, although the two different types of cone cell present in green sunfish do facilitate color discrimination.

== IGFA records ==
The International Game Fish Association (IGFA) all-tackle world record for the species stands at 0.96 kg (2 lb 2 oz), caught from Stockton Lake, Missouri in 1971.

== Aquaria ==
An aggressive sunfish, it is difficult to keep with other green sunfishes, other sunfishes, or even other perciform fishes in general unless kept in very spacious aquaria or ponds. Like many fishes, it is more tolerant of distantly related species (i.e., catfishes and minnows), if they are too large to be eaten. The green sunfish accepts a variety of foods, including flakes, pellets, krill, brine shrimp, bloodworms, and live prey.
