= Murdock Township, Douglas County, Illinois =

Murdock Township
- Township
- Location in Douglas County

- Douglas County's location in Illinois
- Coordinates: 39°49′12″N 88°04′53″W
- Country: United States
- State: Illinois
- County: Douglas
- Established: December 7, 1882

Area
  - Total: 30.88 sq mi (80.0 km^{2})
  - Land: 30.84 sq mi (79.9 km^{2})
  - Water: 0.04 sq mi (0.10 km^{2}) 0.12%
- Elevation: 690 ft (210 m)

Population (2020)
  - Total: 210
  - Density: 6.8/sq mi (2.6/km^{2})
- Time zone: UTC-6 (CST)
  - Summer (DST): UTC-5 (CDT)
- ZIP codes: 61852, 61919, 61941, 61942, 61956
- FIPS code: 17-041-51427

Murdock Township is one of nine townships in Douglas County, in the U.S. state of Illinois. As of the 2020 census, its population was 210 and it contained 115 housing units. It was formed from Camargo and Newman townships on December 7, 1882.

== Geography ==
According to the 2021 census gazetteer files, Murdock Township has a total area of 30.88 square miles (79.98 km^{2}), of which 30.84 square miles (79.88 km^{2}) (or 99.88%) is land and 0.04 square miles (0.10 km^{2}) (or 0.12%) is water.

=== Unincorporated towns ===
- Fairland at 39.876422°N 88.101707°W
- Murdock at 39.800867°N 88.078372°W

=== Cemeteries ===
The township contains these two cemeteries: Jordan and Murdock.

=== Major highways ===
- U.S. Route 36

=== Airports and landing strips ===
- Mayhall Airport

== Demographics ==
As of the 2020 census there were 210 people, 113 households, and 113 families residing in the township. The population density was 6.80 inhabitants per square mile (2.63/km^{2}). There were 115 housing units at an average density of 3.72 per square mile (1.44/km^{2}). The racial makeup of the township was 98.10% White, 0.00% African American, 0.00% Native American, 0.00% Asian, 0.00% Pacific Islander, 0.95% from other races, and 0.95% from two or more races. Hispanic or Latino of any race were 2.38% of the population.

There were 113 households, out of which 42.50% had children under the age of 18 living with them, 46.02% were married couples living together, 0.00% had a female householder with no spouse present, and none were non-families.No households were made up of individuals. The average household size was 2.73 and the average family size was 2.35.

The township's age distribution consisted of 21.4% under the age of 18, 4.9% from 18 to 24, 39.2% from 25 to 44, 21% from 45 to 64, and 13.3% who were 65 years of age or older. The median age was 33.3 years. For every 100 females, there were 111.0 males. For every 100 females age 18 and over, there were 114.2 males.

The median income for a household in the township was $36,746, and the median income for a family was $31,328. Males had a median income of $29,557 versus $37,784 for females. The per capita income for the township was $22,020. About 0.0% of families and 14.0% of the population were below the poverty line, including 0.0% of those under age 18 and 0.0% of those age 65 or over.

Historical population
Census	Pop.	Note	%±
1930	790		—
1940	720		−8.9%
1950	643		−10.7%
1960	549		−14.6%
1970	435		−20.8%
1980	383		−12.0%
1990	374		−2.3%
2000	267		−28.6%
2010	225		−15.7%
2020	210		−6.7%
U.S. Decennial Census

== School districts ==
- Heritage Community Unit School District 8
- Shiloh Community Unit School District 1
- Villa Grove Community Unit School District 302

== Political districts ==
- State House District 110
- State Senate District 55
