= Douglas County Courthouse (Illinois) =

Local government building in the United States

Coordinates: 39°47′44″N 88°17′7″W

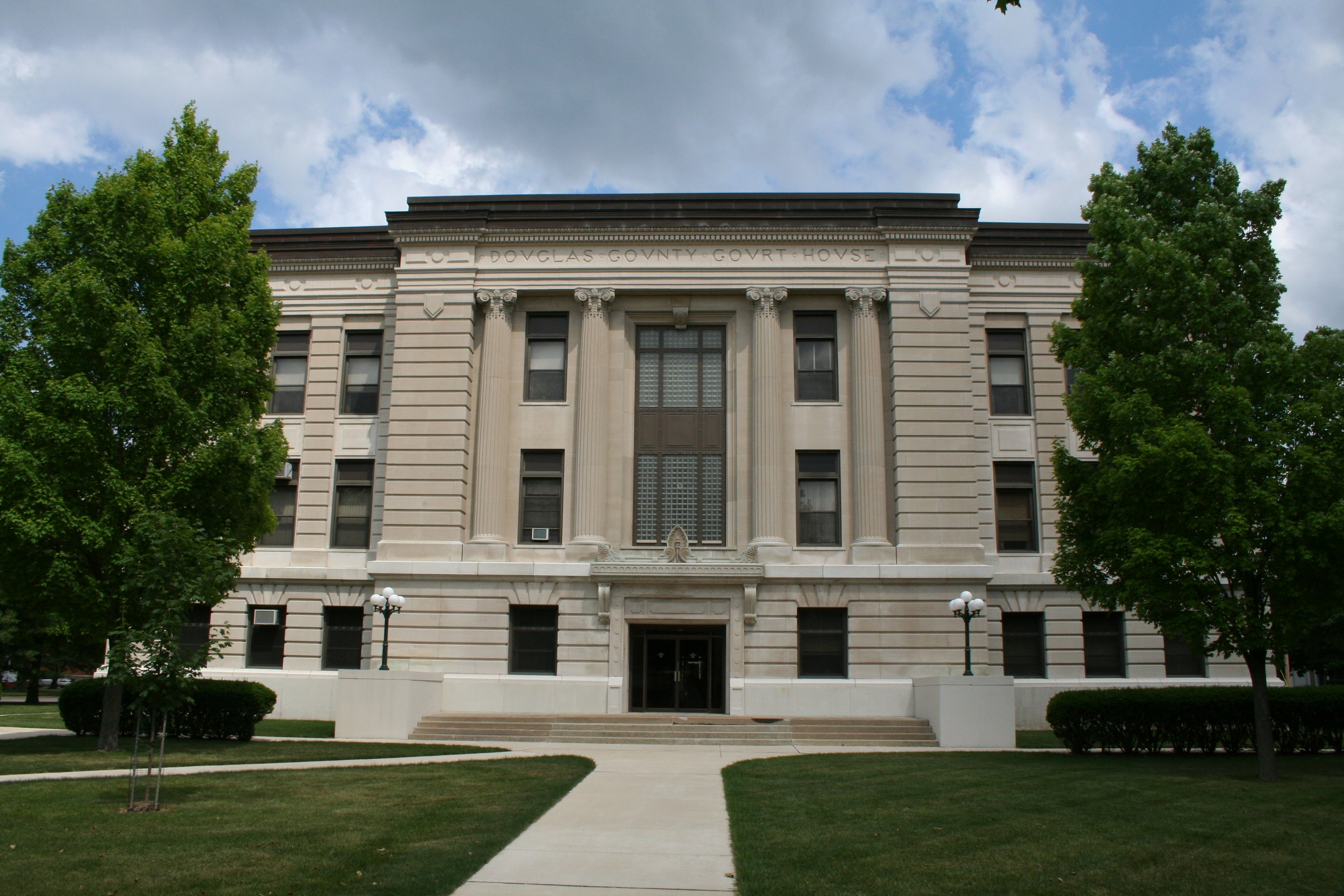
Facade

The Douglas County Courthouse is a government building in Tuscola, the county seat of Douglas County, Illinois, United States. Completed in 1913, it is the third courthouse in the history of Douglas County.

Douglas County's first pioneers arrived in 1829, although occasional squatters had been present beforehand. The widespread prairies were deemed a barrier to early settlement, so the population of the area (then part of Coles County) remained low into the 1850s, and Douglas County was formed in 1859. The bill providing for the creation of the county permitted an April 1859 public vote on the location of the seat, and candidate communities included Tuscola, Arcola, Camargo, and Hackett's Grove. The county court quickly annulled this vote, due to gross electoral fraud (the number of votes from both Tuscola and Arcola was ten times the number of voters in the two towns), and only after a second vote one month later could the seat's assignment to Tuscola be settled.

The county's first court session was held in an Illinois Central depot, and later sessions in two different commercial buildings, including one rented by the county recorder. The initial purpose-built courthouse was a small wooden building, which was erected at private expense. Construction began in 1864 on the second courthouse, a two-story brick building with sheriff's house and jail in the basement. O.L. Kinney, the Chicago architect responsible for the design, projected a $15,000 cost, but the final cost amounted to nearly three times that estimate. Further costs appeared on an annual basis, due to numerous problems that required expensive maintenance, and the placement of the jail inside the courthouse was eventually deemed unsafe to use. Consequently, the current courthouse was built in its place over a two-year period, beginning in 1911 and being completed in 1913. A stone Neoclassical structure with a three-part facade featuring Ionic columns in the center, it cost approximately $170,000 to complete.
