= Hugo, Illinois =

- Unincorporated community
- Location within Illinois Location within the United States
- Coordinates: 39°45′14″N 88°08′56″W
- Country: United States
- State: Illinois
- County: Douglas
- Elevation: 630 ft (190 m)
- Time zone: UTC-6 (Central (CST))
  - Summer (DST): UTC-5 (CDT)
- Area code: 217
- GNIS feature ID: 422830

Hugo is an unincorporated community in Douglas County, Illinois, United States. Hugo is 3 miles (4.8 km) south-southeast of Camargo.

Hugo was settled in the mid-1830s by pioneers arriving from Ohio and Kentucky. One settler brought slaves, resulting in a lawsuit over the freedom of the enslaved residents in a free state, argued by future President Abraham Lincoln. Before being established as a town, Hugo was the site of a trading post on a fur trading trail through Illinois. The town was said to have a blacksmith, doctor's office, two churches, and a store at the turn of the 20th century; the final store closed around 1996, leaving the town without businesses. The Hugo post office had closed around 1900.
