= Walnut Point State Park =

State park in Douglas County, Illinois

- IUCN category III (natural monument or feature)
- Location within Illinois Location within the United States
- Location: Sargent Township, Douglas County, Illinois, United States
- Nearest city: Oakland, Illinois
- Coordinates: 39°41′52″N 88°02′16″W
- Area: 671 acres (272 ha)
- Established: 1968
- Governing body: Illinois Department of Natural Resources

Walnut Point State Park is an Illinois state park on 671 acres (272 ha) in Douglas County, Illinois, United States. The park contains a small lake. The nearest community is Oakland.

Established in 1968 and managed by the Illinois Department of Natural Resources, the park features a 59-acre artificial lake, extensive hardwood forests, and a variety of recreational opportunities including camping, fishing, hiking, and hunting.

== Natural features ==
Walnut Point State Park is located within an agricultural region of east-central Illinois but preserves a diverse natural landscape of hardwood forest, prairie restoration areas, and a 65-acre nature preserve known as Upper Embarras Woods. Tree species in the park include oak, hickory, maple, walnut, locust, and sassafras. The park supports a variety of wildlife, including mammals, reptiles, amphibians, and numerous bird species such as songbirds, owls, herons, and Canada geese.

== Lake ==
Walnut Point Lake is a stream-fed lake formed by an earthen dam. The lake covers approximately 59 acres, with an average depth of about 12.5 feet and multiple finger-like coves along its shoreline. Boating is limited to electric trolling motors, and swimming is not permitted.

== Recreation ==
The park offers a range of recreational activities including camping, hiking, fishing, picnicking, hunting, and winter sports. Over 5 miles of trails are available, including the Whispering Pines Trail, Woodpecker Trail (partially accessible), and Observatory Trail. Fishing opportunities include largemouth bass, bluegill, channel catfish, and crappie, with access provided by docks, piers, and boat launches. Camping facilities include Class A (electric), Class C (walk-in), and group camping areas, along with shower buildings and a dump station. Seasonal activities include cross-country skiing, ice fishing, and limited hunting such as archery deer and small game.

== Accessibility ==
Walnut Point State Park includes accessible facilities such as parking areas, restrooms, campsites, fishing piers, and portions of the trail system, including an accessible segment of the Woodpecker Trail.
