= Atwood, Illinois =

Atwood
- Village
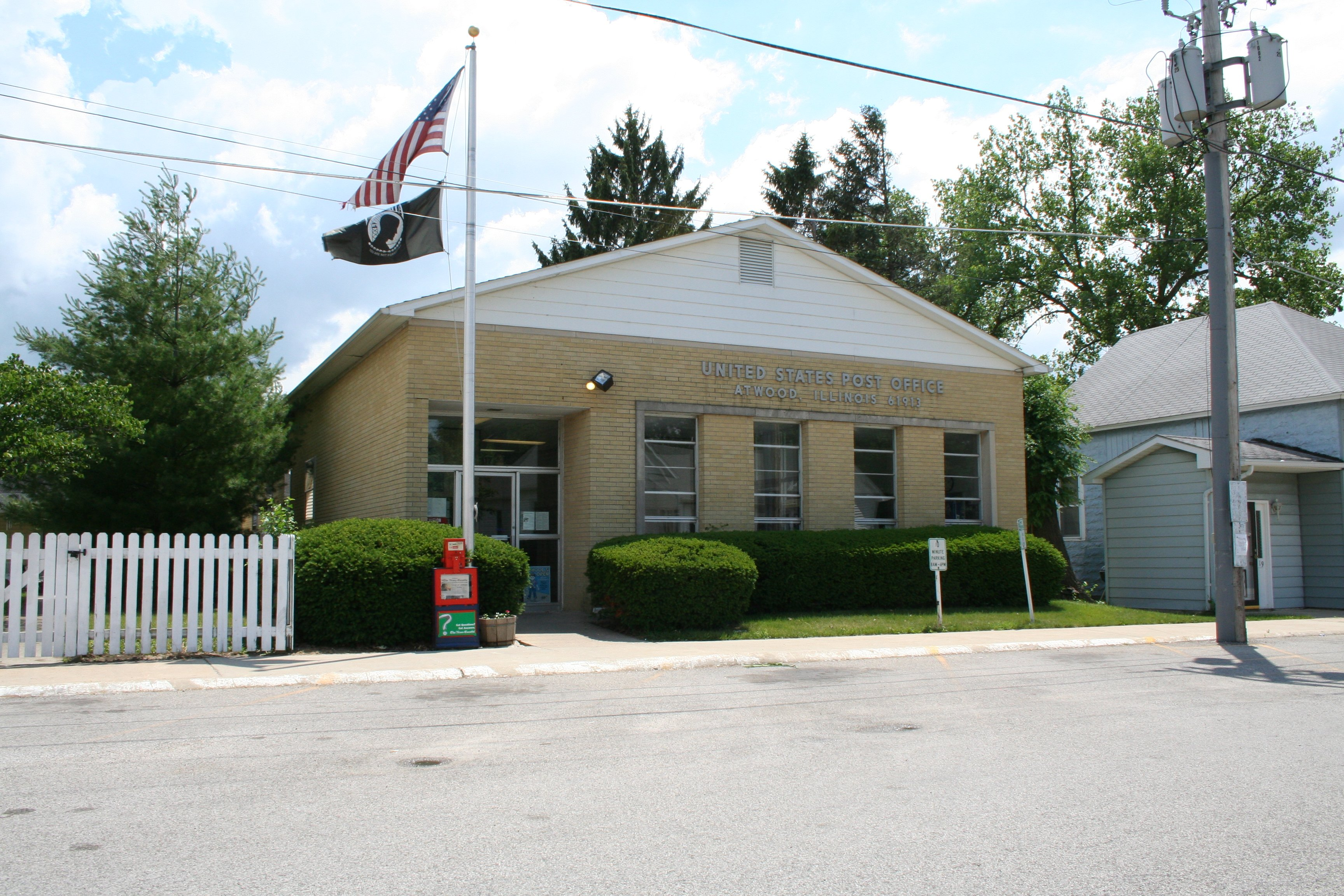
- Atwood, Illinois Post Office, 2007

- Location of Atwood in Piatt County, Illinois.
- Coordinates: 39°47′57″N 88°27′46″W
- Country: United States
- State: Illinois
- Counties: Piatt, Douglas
- Townships: Unity, Garrett

Area
  - Total: 0.61 sq mi (1.59 km^{2})
  - Land: 0.61 sq mi (1.59 km^{2})
  - Water: 0 sq mi (0.00 km^{2})
- Elevation: 673 ft (205 m)

Population (2020)
  - Total: 1,116
  - Density: 1,820/sq mi (702/km^{2})
- Time zone: UTC-6 (CST)
  - Summer (DST): UTC-5 (CDT)
- ZIP Code(s): 61913
- Area code: 217
- FIPS code: 17-02882
- GNIS ID: 2398007

Atwood is a village in Douglas and Piatt counties in Illinois, United States. Main Street runs along the county line with Douglas County to the east and Piatt County to the west. The population was 1,116 at the 2020 census.

== History ==
=== Incorporation ===
On December 14, 1883, a Petition was filed with W.H. Basset, county judge, and was signed by 30 local residents, most residing in Douglas County. This petition set forth a desire to become incorporated as the "village of Atwood", the population in the proposed territory was ~300 residents. On January 9, 1884, an election was held in the office of J.W Merritt, J.P. The election resulted in 66 votes for village organization, and 42 votes against village organization, total 128 votes.

== Geography ==
According to the 2010 census, Atwood has a total area of 0.63 square miles (1.63 km^{2}), all land.

== Demographics ==
Historical population
Census	Pop.	Note	%±
1880	212		—
1890	530		150.0%
1900	698		31.7%
1910	659		−5.6%
1920	883		34.0%
1930	683		−22.7%
1940	707		3.5%
1950	661		−6.5%
1960	1,258		90.3%
1970	1,264		0.5%
1980	1,464		15.8%
1990	1,253		−14.4%
2000	1,290		3.0%
2010	1,224		−5.1%
2020	1,116		−8.8%
U.S. Decennial Census 2020

=== 2020 census ===
As of the 2020 census, Atwood had a population of 1,116 people. There were 478 households in the village.

The population density was 1,817.59 inhabitants per square mile (701.78/km^{2}). The median age was 40.9 years. 24.1% of residents were under the age of 18 and 20.0% were 65 years of age or older. For every 100 females there were 91.8 males, and for every 100 females age 18 and over there were 92.9 males.

0.0% of residents lived in urban areas, while 100.0% lived in rural areas.

Of the village's households, 26.2% had children under the age of 18 living in them. 48.1% were married-couple households, 21.3% had a male householder and no spouse or partner present, and 24.9% had a female householder and no spouse or partner present. About 32.8% of all households were made up of individuals, and 14.9% had someone living alone who was 65 years of age or older.

There were 556 housing units at an average density of 905.54 per square mile (349.63/km^{2}). Of all housing units, 14.0% were vacant. The homeowner vacancy rate was 2.8% and the rental vacancy rate was 4.9%.

Racial composition as of the 2020 census
Race	Number	Percent
White	1,073	96.1%
Black or African American	4	0.4%
American Indian and Alaska Native	0	0.0%
Asian	5	0.4%
Native Hawaiian and Other Pacific Islander	0	0.0%
Some other race	3	0.3%
Two or more races	31	2.8%
Hispanic or Latino (of any race)	15	1.3%

=== Income and poverty ===
The median income for a household in the village was $48,750, and the median income for a family was $55,000. Males had a median income of $47,179 versus $32,857 for females. The per capita income for the village was $25,087. About 11.8% of families and 16.4% of the population were below the poverty line, including 23.9% of those under age 18 and 14.4% of those age 65 or over.

== Notable people ==
- Kenneth L. Wilson, former commissioner of the Big Ten Conference and president of the United States Olympic Committee, was born in Atwood.
- The Henningsens is an American country music trio that began in Atwood.

== See also ==
- List of municipalities in Illinois
