= Billy Consolo =

American baseball player and coach (1934–2008)

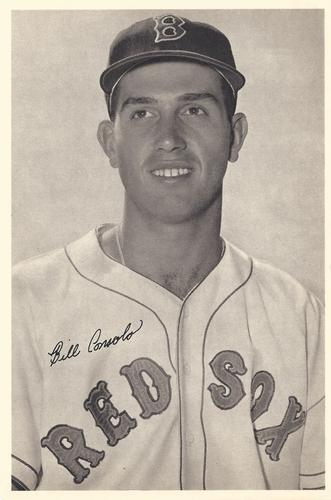
- Shortstop
- Born: August 18, 1934; Cleveland, Ohio, U.S.
- Died: March 27, 2008 (aged 73); Westlake Village, California, U.S.
- Batted: Right Threw: Right

MLB debut
- April 20, 1953, for the Boston Red Sox

Last MLB appearance
- September 30, 1962, for the Kansas City Athletics

MLB statistics
- Batting average: .221
- Home runs: 9
- Runs batted in: 83
- Stats at Baseball Reference

Teams
- As player: Boston Red Sox (1953–1959); Washington Senators / Minnesota Twins (1959–1961); Philadelphia Phillies (1962); Los Angeles Angels (1962); Kansas City Athletics (1962); As coach: Detroit Tigers (1979–1992, 1995)

William Angelo Consolo (/kɒnˈsoʊloʊ/ kon-SOH-loh; August 18, 1934 – March 27, 2008) was an American professional baseball shortstop and coach, who played in Major League Baseball (MLB) for five different teams between 1953 and 1962, most notably the Boston Red Sox and Washington Senators/Minnesota Twins.

Primarily used in a reserve role, Consolo enjoyed his best season with the 1957 Red Sox, batting .270 in 68 games. He later served as the bench coach for the Detroit Tigers for 15 seasons, from 1979 to 1992 and again in 1995 under manager Sparky Anderson, including for the Tigers' 1984 World Series champions. Listed at 5 ft 11 in (1.80 m), 180 lb., Consolo batted and threw right-handed.

== Career ==
Born in Cleveland, Ohio to Italian immigrants, Consolo grew up in Los Angeles, graduating from Dorsey High School. While in high school, Consolo (along with longtime friend Anderson) played on the school's baseball team. Consolo also ran track at Dorsey and was named the Los Angeles High School Baseball city player of the year in 1951 and 1952.

Consolo also played (along with Anderson) for the Crenshaw Post 715 American Legion team, winning the American Legion Baseball national title in 1951, winning the championship at Briggs Stadium, the stadium where he coached the Detroit Tigers.

Consolo went directly to the Red Sox from high school after signing in 1953 (bonus baby). Consolo joined the Red Sox at age 18; Sparky Anderson said that he was the finest athlete he had seen at that age. Consolo played for the Red Sox during six and half years. Consolo was traded to the Washington Senators on June 11, 1959, in a four-player deal that sent relief pitcher Murray Wall and Consolo to the Senators for relief pitcher Dick Hyde and infielder Herb Plews. The Twins later traded Consolo to the Milwaukee Braves on June 1, 1961 for Billy Martin and some cash. In addition to the Senators/Twins (1959–61), Consolo played for the Philadelphia Phillies, Los Angeles Angels and Kansas City Athletics in his final 1962 season. His 1957 average of .270 was 41 points better than he hit in any other year.

In a 10-season career, Consolo was a .221 hitter (260 for 1178), with nine home runs, and 83 runs batted in (RBI), in 603 games, including 158 runs, 31 doubles, 11 triples, nine stolen bases, and a .315 on-base percentage.

After his playing days ended in 1962, and before his return to uniform as one of Anderson's coaches in 1979, Consolo returned to Los Angeles and like his father before him he became a barber at the old Statler Hilton Hotel in downtown Los Angeles.

Consolo also worked at Los Angeles Pierce College in Woodland Hills as a sports instructor.

== Death ==
Consolo died from a heart attack at the age of 73 in his Westlake Village, California home on March 27, 2008.

== See also ==
- List of baseball players who went directly to Major League Baseball
