= Dick Hyde (baseball) =

American baseball player (1928–2020)

- Pitcher
- Born: August 3, 1928; Hindsboro, Illinois, U.S.
- Died: April 15, 2020 (aged 91); Champaign, Illinois, U.S.
- Batted: Right Threw: Right

MLB debut
- April 23, 1955, for the Washington Senators

Last MLB appearance
- August 4, 1961, for the Baltimore Orioles

MLB statistics
- Win–loss record: 17–14
- Earned run average: 3.56
- Strikeouts: 144
- Stats at Baseball Reference

Teams
- Washington Senators (1955, 1957–1960); Baltimore Orioles (1961)

Richard Elde Hyde (August 3, 1928 – April 15, 2020) was an American relief pitcher in professional baseball who played in the Major Leagues for six seasons from 1955 to 1961 for the Washington Senators (1955, 1957–1960) and Baltimore Orioles (1961). A right-handed pitcher, he stood 5 feet 11 inches (1.80 m) and weighed 170 pounds (77 kg). Born in Hindsboro, Illinois, he was the father of professional baseball pitcher Rich Hyde.

== Professional career ==
After going to tryout camps for the Chicago Cubs and St. Louis Cardinals in 1947, Hyde was signed by the Washington Senators in 1949, pitching for their D level (then lowest) minor league team that year and the next before military service in Korea, followed by two more seasons of minor league ball for Washington. By 1954, Hyde had made very little progress in Washington's farm system. One day after watching him throw, Calvin Griffith suggested Hyde might become more effective if he came down a little in his pitching motion when he threw. Hyde eventually adopted the submarine style of pitching.

While he made three appearances with the Senators in 1955, Hyde spent all of 1956 in the minors and it was only in 1957 that he established himself in the major leagues. His best year was 1958, when he went 10–3 with 19 saves and a 1.75 earned run average. He also finished 12th in the voting for Most Valuable Player. Hyde's Major League playing career ended with the Baltimore Orioles in 1961, though he finished his career in the Orioles' minor league system in 1962. Of the 169 games Hyde appeared in, all but two were as a relief pitcher.

== Transactions ==
Hyde was purchased by the Baltimore Orioles from the Washington Senators on July 2, 1960. In 1959, Hyde was included in a trade between Washington and the Boston Red Sox. On June 11, Hyde and Herb Plews were sent to Boston for Murray Wall and Billy Consolo. When it was discovered Hyde had a sore arm, he and Wall were returned to their original teams.

Hyde died on April 15, 2020.
