= Garrett, Illinois =

Garrett
- Village
- Location of Garrett in Douglas County, Illinois.
- Coordinates: 39°47′50″N 88°25′29″W
- Country: United States
- State: Illinois
- County: Douglas
- Township: Garrett

Area
  - Total: 0.108 sq mi (0.28 km^{2})
  - Land: 0.108 sq mi (0.28 km^{2})
  - Water: 0 sq mi (0 km^{2})
- Elevation: 673 ft (205 m)

Population (2020)
  - Total: 122
- Time zone: UTC-6 (CST)
  - Summer (DST): UTC-5 (CDT)
- ZIP code: 61913
- Area code: 217
- FIPS code: 17-28742
- GNIS ID: 2398946

Garrett is a village in Douglas County, Illinois, United States. The population was 122 at the 2020 census.

== Geography ==
According to the 2010 census, Garrett has a total area of 0.13 square miles (0.34 km^{2}), all land.

== Demographics ==
As of the 2020 census there were 122 people, 48 households, and 33 families residing in the village. The population density was 1,129.63 inhabitants per square mile (436.15/km^{2}). There were 62 housing units at an average density of 574.07 per square mile (221.65/km^{2}). The racial makeup of the village was 97.54% White, 1.64% from other races, and 0.82% from two or more races. Hispanic or Latino of any race were 7.38% of the population.

There were 48 households, out of which 18.8% had children under the age of 18 living with them, 58.33% were married couples living together, 6.25% had a female householder with no husband present, and 31.25% were non-families. 22.92% of all households were made up of individuals, and 4.17% had someone living alone who was 65 years of age or older. The average household size was 3.00 and the average family size was 2.46.

The village's age distribution consisted of 30.5% under the age of 18, 3.4% from 18 to 24, 21.2% from 25 to 44, 35.6% from 45 to 64, and 9.3% who were 65 years of age or older. The median age was 42.9 years. For every 100 females, there were 76.1 males. For every 100 females age 18 and over, there were 86.4 males.

The median income for a household in the village was $46,667, and the median income for a family was $77,708. Males had a median income of $53,000 versus $24,375 for females. The per capita income for the village was $23,192. About 3.0% of families and 12.7% of the population were below the poverty line, including 19.4% of those under age 18 and none of those age 65 or over.

== Transportation ==
Dial-A-Ride Public Transportation provides dial-a-ride bus transit service to the village. The nearest passenger rail service is at Illinois Terminal in Champaign or at Mattoon station, where Amtrak operates to Chicago, Carbondale, New Orleans, and other destinations.
