= Hindsboro, Illinois =

Hindsboro
- Village
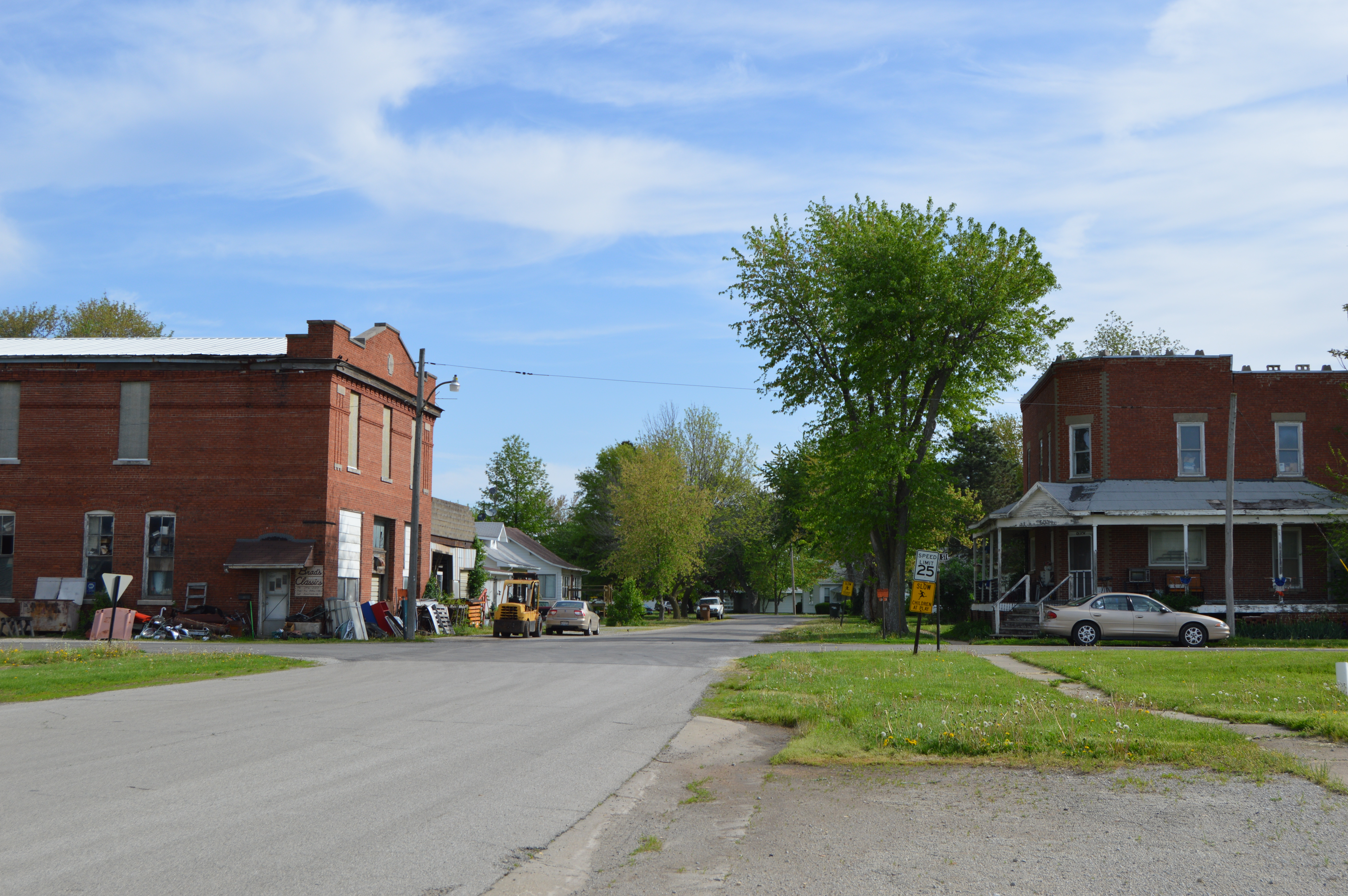
- Sixth and Missouri intersection

- Location of Hindsboro in Douglas County, Illinois.
- Coordinates: 39°41′05″N 88°08′05″W
- Country: United States
- State: Illinois
- County: Douglas
- Township: Bowdre

Area
  - Total: 0.27 sq mi (0.70 km^{2})
  - Land: 0.27 sq mi (0.70 km^{2})
  - Water: 0 sq mi (0.00 km^{2})
- Elevation: 650 ft (200 m)

Population (2020)
  - Total: 275
  - Density: 1,020/sq mi (394/km^{2})
- Time zone: UTC-6 (CST)
  - Summer (DST): UTC-5 (CDT)
- ZIP Code(s): 61930
- Area code: 217
- FIPS code: 17-35281
- GNIS ID: 2398513

Hindsboro is a village in Douglas County, Illinois, United States. The population was 275 at the 2020 census.

== Geography ==
According to the 2010 census, Hindsboro has a total area of 0.31 square miles (0.80 km^{2}), all land.

The Illinois Midland Railroad line, connecting Terre Haute and Peoria, and passing through Paris and Decatur, opened on November 30, 1874. It ran just north of the grain elevator.

== Demographics ==
Historical population
Census	Pop.	Note	%±
1880	97		—
1890	288		196.9%
1900	343		19.1%
1910	498		45.2%
1920	463		−7.0%
1930	424		−8.4%
1940	407		−4.0%
1950	377		−7.4%
1960	376		−0.3%
1970	418		11.2%
1980	407		−2.6%
1990	346		−15.0%
2000	361		4.3%
2010	313		−13.3%
2020	275		−12.1%
U.S. Decennial Census

As of the 2020 census there were 275 people, 160 households, and 118 families residing in the village. The population density was 1,022.30 inhabitants per square mile (394.71/km^{2}). There were 140 housing units at an average density of 520.45 per square mile (200.95/km^{2}). The racial makeup of the village was 95.64% White, 1.45% from other races, and 2.91% from two or more races. Hispanic or Latino of any race were 6.18% of the population.

There were 160 households, out of which 31.3% had children under the age of 18 living with them, 56.25% were married couples living together, 8.13% had a female householder with no husband present, and 26.25% were non-families. 24.38% of all households were made up of individuals, and 14.38% had someone living alone who was 65 years of age or older. The average household size was 2.84 and the average family size was 2.50.

The village's age distribution consisted of 19.8% under the age of 18, 7.5% from 18 to 24, 24.4% from 25 to 44, 28.9% from 45 to 64, and 19.8% who were 65 years of age or older. The median age was 43.0 years. For every 100 females, there were 72.4 males. For every 100 females age 18 and over, there were 79.3 males.

The median income for a household in the village was $58,750, and the median income for a family was $63,125. Males had a median income of $40,673 versus $26,442 for females. The per capita income for the village was $27,193. About 3.4% of families and 4.5% of the population were below the poverty line, including 0.0% of those under age 18 and 3.8% of those age 65 or over.

== Media ==
Hindsboro is served by a weekly paper, the Oakland Independent.

== Transportation ==
Dial-A-Ride Public Transportation provides dial-a-ride bus transit service to the village. The nearest passenger rail service is at Mattoon station, where Amtrak operates to Chicago, Carbondale, New Orleans, and other destinations.

== Notable person ==
- Dick Hyde, pitcher with the Washington Senators and Baltimore Orioles
