= Kemp, Illinois =

Kemp Leasure (previous name)
- Unincorporated community
- Location of Kemp within Illinois Kemp (the United States)
- Coordinates: 39°41′44″N 88°11′07″W
- Country: United States
- State: Illinois
- County: Douglas

Population (2000)
  - Total: 55
- Time zone: UTC-6 (CST)
  - Summer (DST): UTC-5 (CDT)

Kemp is an unincorporated community in Bowdre Township in Douglas County, Illinois, in the eastern part of the state. Situated 153 miles south of Chicago and (approximately) 13 miles north of Charleston, it has a population of (approximately) 55 people.

== History ==
Kemp was originally known as Leasure, Illinois and was still named this at the time of the publishing of the "Plat Book of Douglas County Illinois, Compiled and Published by Geo.A.Ogle and Company in 1893. At this time the Leasure was situated to the north side of the Terre Haute and Peoria Railroad, which had previously been called the Illinois Midland Railroad and by 1914 it was called the Vandalia Railroad and the town had changed its name to Kemp.

Kemp is home to the Kemp Church of Christ which has been a long term staple of the community. The Church was established in 1890 with 70 original charter members. Even in the earliest plat maps found for the town, the church is clearly identified. The centennial celebration of the founding of the church was held in August 1990. The church still stands today and is well attended by many faithful members from around the community.
