= Patterson Springs, Illinois =

- Unincorporated community
- Location within Illinois Location within the United States
- Coordinates: 39°47′32″N 88°11′34″W
- Country: United States
- State: Illinois
- County: Douglas
- Elevation: 659 ft (201 m)
- Time zone: UTC-6 (Central (CST))
  - Summer (DST): UTC-5 (CDT)
- Area code: 217
- GNIS feature ID: 423057

Patterson Springs is an unincorporated community in Douglas County, Illinois, United States. Patterson Springs is located on U.S. Route 36, 1.5 miles (2.4 km) west-southwest of Camargo.

It was the site of the Patterson Springs Chautauqua, which started in 1906. Among other famous speakers, evangelist and former professional baseball player Billy Sunday preached at the 1908 gathering, and Booker T. Washington spoke in 1914. The two-seek session would become like a small village, with families camping on the grounds, a post office, and a trading post. America joining World War I in 1917 proved to be the end of many chautauquas, and attempts to revive the one at Patterson Springs failed. The area then became used for recreation, with swimming, dancing, skating, amusement rides, and other attractions. In recent decades, the site has become a residential suburban community.
