= Fairland, Illinois =

- Unincorporated community
- Location within Illinois Location within the United States
- Coordinates: 39°52′35″N 88°06′06″W
- Country: United States
- State: Illinois
- Counties: Douglas
- Elevation: 653 ft (199 m)
- Time zone: UTC-6 (Central (CST))
  - Summer (DST): UTC-5 (CDT)
- Area code: 217
- GNIS feature ID: 408176

Fairland is an unincorporated community in northern Douglas county, Illinois, United States. Fairland is located along a disused railroad line three miles east of Villa Grove.
