= Sargent Township, Douglas County, Illinois =

Sargent Township
- Township
- Location in Douglas County

- Douglas County's location in Illinois
- Coordinates: 39°43′34″N 88°02′16″W
- Country: United States
- State: Illinois
- County: Douglas
- Established: November 5, 1867

Area
  - Total: 47.02 sq mi (121.8 km^{2})
  - Land: 46.95 sq mi (121.6 km^{2})
  - Water: 0.07 sq mi (0.18 km^{2}) 0.14%
- Elevation: 669 ft (204 m)

Population (2020)
  - Total: 240
  - Density: 5.1/sq mi (2.0/km^{2})
- Time zone: UTC-6 (CST)
  - Summer (DST): UTC-5 (CDT)
- ZIP codes: 61917, 61919, 61930, 61942, 61943
- FIPS code: 17-041-67730

Sargent Township is one of nine townships in Douglas County, Illinois, USA. As of the 2020 census, its population was 240 and it contained 125 housing units. The township contains Walnut Point State Park.

== Geography ==
According to the 2021 census gazetteer files, Sargent Township has a total area of 47.02 square miles (121.78 km^{2}), of which 46.95 square miles (121.60 km^{2}) (or 99.86%) is land and 0.07 square miles (0.18 km^{2}) (or 0.14%) is water.

=== Cemeteries ===
The township contains these three cemeteries: Albin, Gwinn and Pleasant Grove.

=== Major highways ===
- Illinois Route 133

=== State parks ===
- Walnut Point State Park

== Demographics ==
As of the 2020 census there were 240 people, 108 households, and 102 families residing in the township. The population density was 5.10 inhabitants per square mile (1.97/km^{2}). There were 125 housing units at an average density of 2.66 per square mile (1.03/km^{2}). The racial makeup of the township was 94.58% White, 0.42% African American, 0.42% Native American, 0.00% Asian, 0.00% Pacific Islander, 0.42% from other races, and 4.17% from two or more races. Hispanic or Latino of any race were 2.08% of the population.

There were 108 households, out of which 45.40% had children under the age of 18 living with them, 84.26% were married couples living together, 6.48% had a female householder with no spouse present, and 5.56% were non-families. 5.60% of all households were made up of individuals, and 5.60% had someone living alone who was 65 years of age or older. The average household size was 2.63 and the average family size was 2.73.

The township's age distribution consisted of 21.5% under the age of 18, 3.2% from 18 to 24, 32.4% from 25 to 44, 13.8% from 45 to 64, and 29.2% who were 65 years of age or older. The median age was 42.4 years. For every 100 females, there were 100.0 males. For every 100 females age 18 and over, there were 97.3 males.

The median income for a household in the township was $84,539, and the median income for a family was $84,737. Males had a median income of $38,000 versus $47,823 for females. The per capita income for the township was $43,547. None of the population was below the poverty line.

Historical population
Census	Pop.	Note	%±
1930	878		—
1940	747		−14.9%
1950	607		−18.7%
1960	516		−15.0%
1970	371		−28.1%
1980	399		7.5%
1990	343		−14.0%
2000	336		−2.0%
2010	286		−14.9%
2020	240		−16.1%
U.S. Decennial Census

== School districts ==
- Villa Grove Community Unit School District
- Oakland Community Unit School District 5
- Shiloh Community Unit School District 1

== Political districts ==
- State House District 110
- State Senate District 55
