= Filson, Illinois =

- Unincorporated community
- Location within Illinois Location within the United States
- Coordinates: 39°41′22″N 88°13′55″W
- Country: United States
- State: Illinois
- County: Douglas
- Elevation: 646 ft (197 m)
- Time zone: UTC-6 (Central (CST))
  - Summer (DST): UTC-5 (CDT)
- Area code: 217
- GNIS feature ID: 408369

Filson is an unincorporated community in Douglas County, Illinois, United States. Filson is 4 miles (6.4 km) east of Arcola.
