= Villa Grove, Illinois =

Villa Grove
- City
- City of Villa Grove
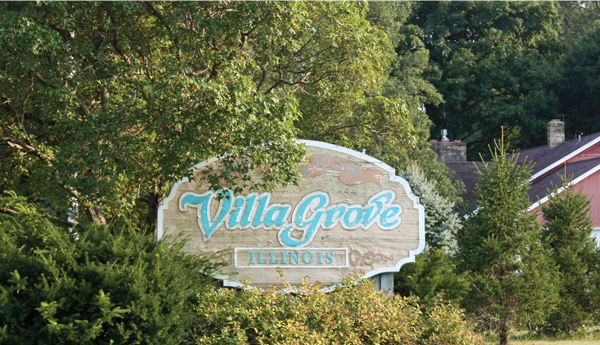
- Motto: "A nice place to live.”
- Location of Villa Grove in Douglas County, Illinois.
- Coordinates: 39°52′20″N 88°09′40″W
- Country: United States
- State: Illinois
- County: Douglas
- Township: Camargo
- Founded: 1903

Area
  - Total: 1.51 sq mi (3.91 km^{2})
  - Land: 1.50 sq mi (3.89 km^{2})
  - Water: 0.0077 sq mi (0.02 km^{2})
- Elevation: 646 ft (197 m)

Population (2020)
  - Total: 2,472
  - Density: 1,646.3/sq mi (635.64/km^{2})
- Time zone: UTC-6 (CST)
  - Summer (DST): UTC-5 (CDT)
- ZIP code: 61956
- Area code: 217
- FIPS code: 17-77941
- GNIS ID: 2397140
- Website: https://villagrove.org/

Villa Grove is a city in Douglas County, Illinois, along the Embarras River. The population was 2,472 at the 2020 census.

== History ==
Villa Grove was chartered in 1903 after the area was recognized by the Chicago and Eastern Illinois Railroad (C&EI) as being exactly halfway between Chicago and St. Louis. This made it a desirable location for a steam locomotive repair facility. Villa Grove later became the site of a C&EI division headquarters and roundhouse.

Villa Grove was known for its Pancake Festivals in the 1940s, which drew crowds over 10,000. In the 1970s, the festival was replaced by the Ag Days celebration. Ag Days currently offers carnival rides, a car show, a parade, multiple vendors, live music, and a demolition derby.

In 1923, Villa Grove's high school basketball team, the Blue Devils, defeated Rockford 32–29 to win the Illinois High School Boys Basketball Championship.

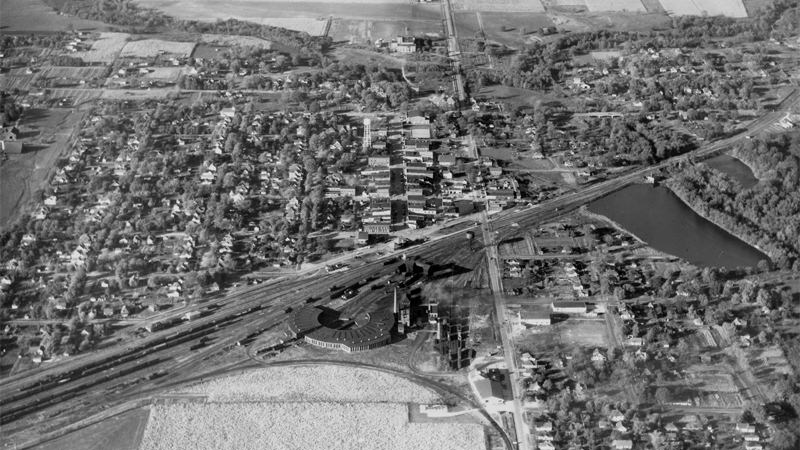
Railyard aerial view

Villa Grove's historic rail depot was demolished in the predawn hours of Friday, October 29, 1976, despite a city ordinance that was intended to protect the structure. The city later received reparation for the destruction.

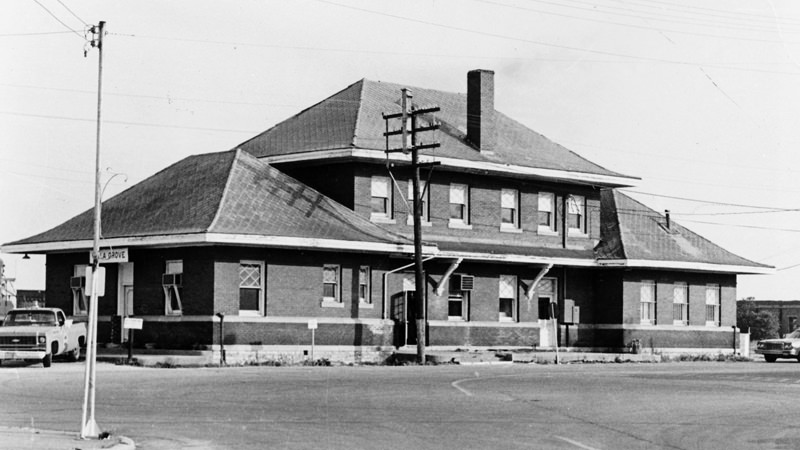
Villa Grove C&EI depot, 1960s

On August 10, 2011, a 100-year-old vacant building on main street in Villa Grove was destroyed by a fire set by two boys aged 9 and 14. At least 15 fire departments responded to the blaze containing it to the original structure. The boys were ordered to pay $126,076 in restitution. The 14-year-old received 3 years probation, 30 days in jail and 100 hours of community service. The 9 year old received 2 years probation and 50 hours community service. State law prohibited jail time for the 9 year old. Adjacent businesses were temporarily displaced due to damage caused by smoke and heat.

=== Flooding ===
Villa Grove's location at the confluence of Jordan Slough and the Embarras River has resulted in flooding during the city's history. In January 1950, Villa Grove was isolated by flooding, more than 1/3 of the city was underwater and the Red Cross reported 100 families were homeless. Another flood in April 1994 left over half of the city's 1,000 homes flooded and the city's water supply was tainted. At one point, portions of main street were 6 feet underwater.

After the severe flooding in 1994 and additional flooding in the following years, a program was implemented to purchase and demolish homes voluntarily from owners in the flood plain. The Federal Emergency Management Agency (FEMA) and the Illinois Emergency Management Agency (IEMA) used the Hazard Mitigation Grant Program (HMGP) to purchase 17 homes in two phases from 1995 to 2000. IEMA noted that when another flood occurred in June 2008, the 17 properties purchased would have again been flooded had they not been purchased and demolished. Additional plans were also made to purchase more flood prone properties after the 2008 flood. After flooding in April 2013, FEMA again provided funding to purchase and demolish eight more homes and one public building in Villa Grove under HMGP.

These improvements have minimized the amount of area impacted by flooding. In 2021, a new bridge was built on Illinois Route 130 over the river. The new bridge is at a higher elevation and allows for better drainage. These improvements have resulted in minimal flooding in the area in recent years.

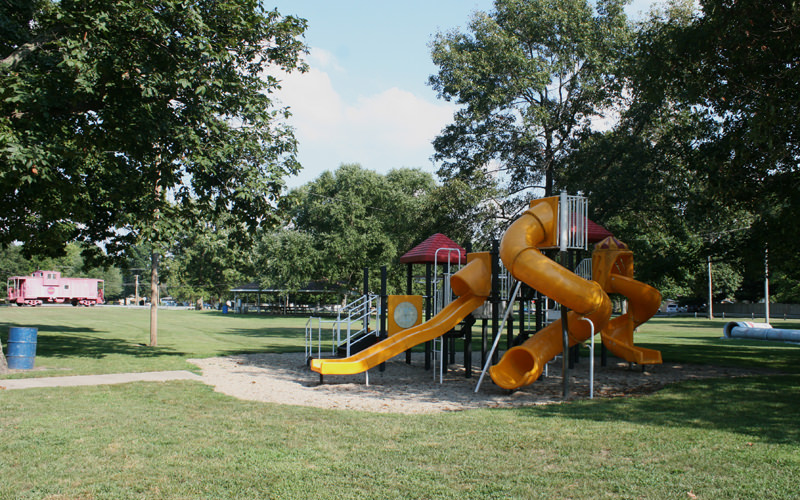
Henson Park

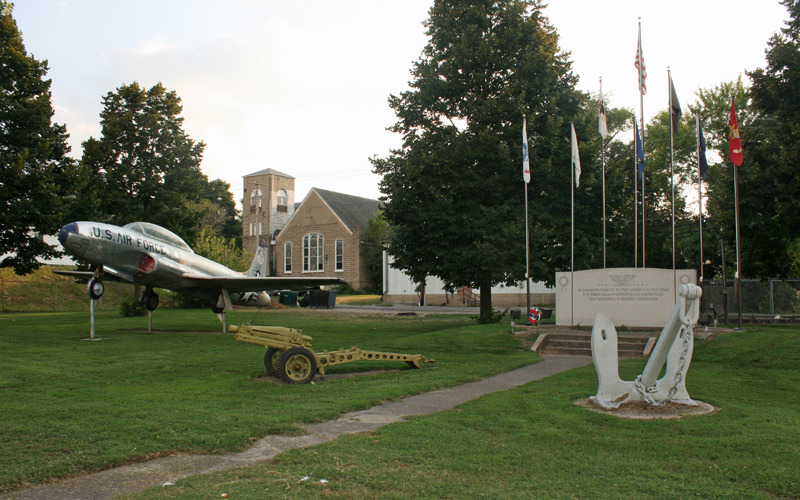
VFW Park on Main Street

== Geography ==
According to the 2021 census gazetteer files, Villa Grove has a total area of 1.51 square miles (3.91 km^{2}), of which 1.50 square miles (3.88 km^{2}) (or 99.54%) is land and 0.01 square miles (0.03 km^{2}) (or 0.46%) is water.

== Demographics ==
Historical population
Census	Pop.	Note	%±
1910	1,828		—
1920	2,493		36.4%
1930	2,001		−19.7%
1940	2,072		3.5%
1950	2,026		−2.2%
1960	2,308		13.9%
1970	2,605		12.9%
1980	2,707		3.9%
1990	2,734		1.0%
2000	2,553		−6.6%
2010	2,537		−0.6%
2020	2,472		−2.6%
U.S. Decennial Census; 1910, 1920 1930, 1940, 1950; 1960, 1970, 1980 1990; 2000, 2010, 2013

=== 2020 census ===
As of the 2020 census, Villa Grove had a population of 2,472. The population density was 1,638.17 inhabitants per square mile (632.50/km^{2}). There were 1,101 housing units at an average density of 729.62 per square mile (281.71/km^{2}).

The median age was 38.2 years. 25.2% of residents were under the age of 18 and 16.6% of residents were 65 years of age or older. For every 100 females there were 96.5 males, and for every 100 females age 18 and over there were 96.8 males age 18 and over.

0.0% of residents lived in urban areas, while 100.0% lived in rural areas.

There were 1,032 households in Villa Grove, of which 33.3% had children under the age of 18 living in them. Of all households, 46.0% were married-couple households, 19.2% were households with a male householder and no spouse or partner present, and 26.1% were households with a female householder and no spouse or partner present. About 29.0% of all households were made up of individuals and 11.9% had someone living alone who was 65 years of age or older.

There were 1,101 housing units, of which 6.3% were vacant. The homeowner vacancy rate was 0.4% and the rental vacancy rate was 4.4%.

Racial composition as of the 2020 census
Race	Number	Percent
White	2,275	92.0%
Black or African American	16	0.6%
American Indian and Alaska Native	9	0.4%
Asian	6	0.2%
Native Hawaiian and Other Pacific Islander	2	0.1%
Some other race	26	1.1%
Two or more races	138	5.6%
Hispanic or Latino (of any race)	78	3.2%

=== Income and poverty ===
The median income for a household in the city was $53,971, and the median income for a family was $69,417. Males had a median income of $41,071 versus $26,915 for females. The per capita income for the city was $27,520. About 12.9% of families and 10.8% of the population were below the poverty line, including 11.4% of those under age 18 and 8.2% of those age 65 or over.

== Economy ==
Villa Grove is situated far enough from Champaign-Urbana that it can support several restaurants and businesses. The city currently supports several restaurants, bars, two gas stations, two grocery stores, and a nine-hole golf course and country club. There are several parks that provide various playing fields, and the city has recently built a new community center for rec-teams to play in.

== Utilities ==
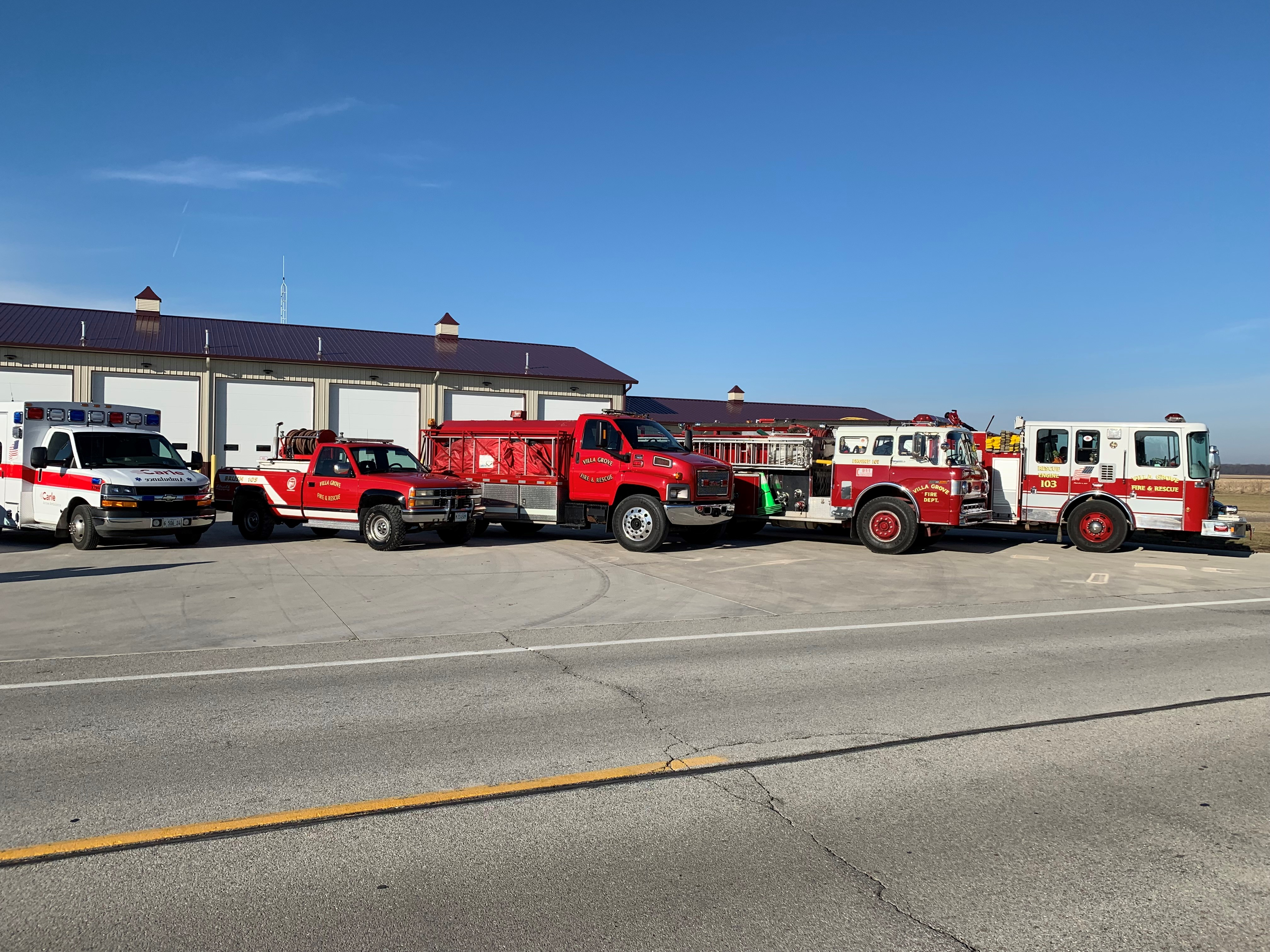
Villa Grove Fire Department

The City of Villa Grove maintains a full-time administrative staff, public works department, police department, and a paid on-call fire department. The city recently sold its water and sewer utilities to Illinois American Water.

== Transportation ==
Dial-A-Ride Public Transportation provides dial-a-ride bus transit service to the city. The nearest passenger rail service is at Illinois Terminal in Champaign, where Amtrak operates to Chicago, Carbondale, New Orleans, and other destinations.

== See also ==
- People from Douglas County, Illinois for notable people from the area
