= Murdock, Illinois =

Murdock
- Unincorporated community
- Location within the state of Illinois
- Coordinates: 39°48′3″N 88°4′42″W
- Country: United States
- State: Illinois
- County: Douglas
- Elevation: 640 ft (200 m)
- Time zone: UTC-6 (Central (CST))
  - Summer (DST): UTC-5 (CDT)
- ZIP codes: 61941
- GNIS feature ID: 414242

Murdock is an unincorporated community in Douglas County, Illinois, United States. Its elevation is 640 feet (195 m). Although Murdock is unincorporated, it has a post office, with the ZIP code of 61941.

On September 2, 1983, a Baltimore and Ohio Railroad train derailed at about 3:30 p.m., starting a fire. The fire heated tanks filled with liquefied petroleum gas, resulting in two large boiling liquid expanding vapor explosions. The force of the first explosion catapulted one of the tanker cars 3,630 feet (1,110 m) into the wilderness. As night fell, the fire continued to burn, and the second explosion created a blinding light as if it was daylight at night. Both of these incidents were caught on video and shown on television programs and news segments around the world.
