= Chicken Bristle, Illinois =

- Unincorporated community
- Location within Illinois Location within the United States
- Coordinates: 39°50′10″N 88°22′00″W
- Country: United States
- State: Illinois
- County: Douglas
- Elevation: 673 ft (205 m)
- Time zone: UTC-6 (Central (CST))
  - Summer (DST): UTC-5 (CDT)
- Zip: 61828
- Area code: 217
- GNIS feature ID: 1747779

Chicken Bristle is an unincorporated community located in Douglas County, Illinois, United States. Chicken Bristle is 5.5 miles (8.9 km) northwest of Tuscola.

Chicken Bristle has been noted for its unusual place name.
