= Ficklin, Illinois =

- Unincorporated community
- Location within Illinois Location within the United States
- Coordinates: 39°47′55″N 88°21′19″W
- Country: United States
- State: Illinois
- County: Douglas
- Elevation: 673 ft (205 m)
- Time zone: UTC-6 (Central (CST))
  - Summer (DST): UTC-5 (CDT)
- Area code: 217
- GNIS feature ID: 408352

Ficklin is an unincorporated community in Douglas County, Illinois, United States. Ficklin is 4 miles (6.4 km) west of Tuscola.

The community (at times called a village locally) is named after Orlando B. Ficklin, who served in the United States House of Representatives. It once had a store and post office.
