= Douglas County, Illinois =

County in Illinois, United States

- County
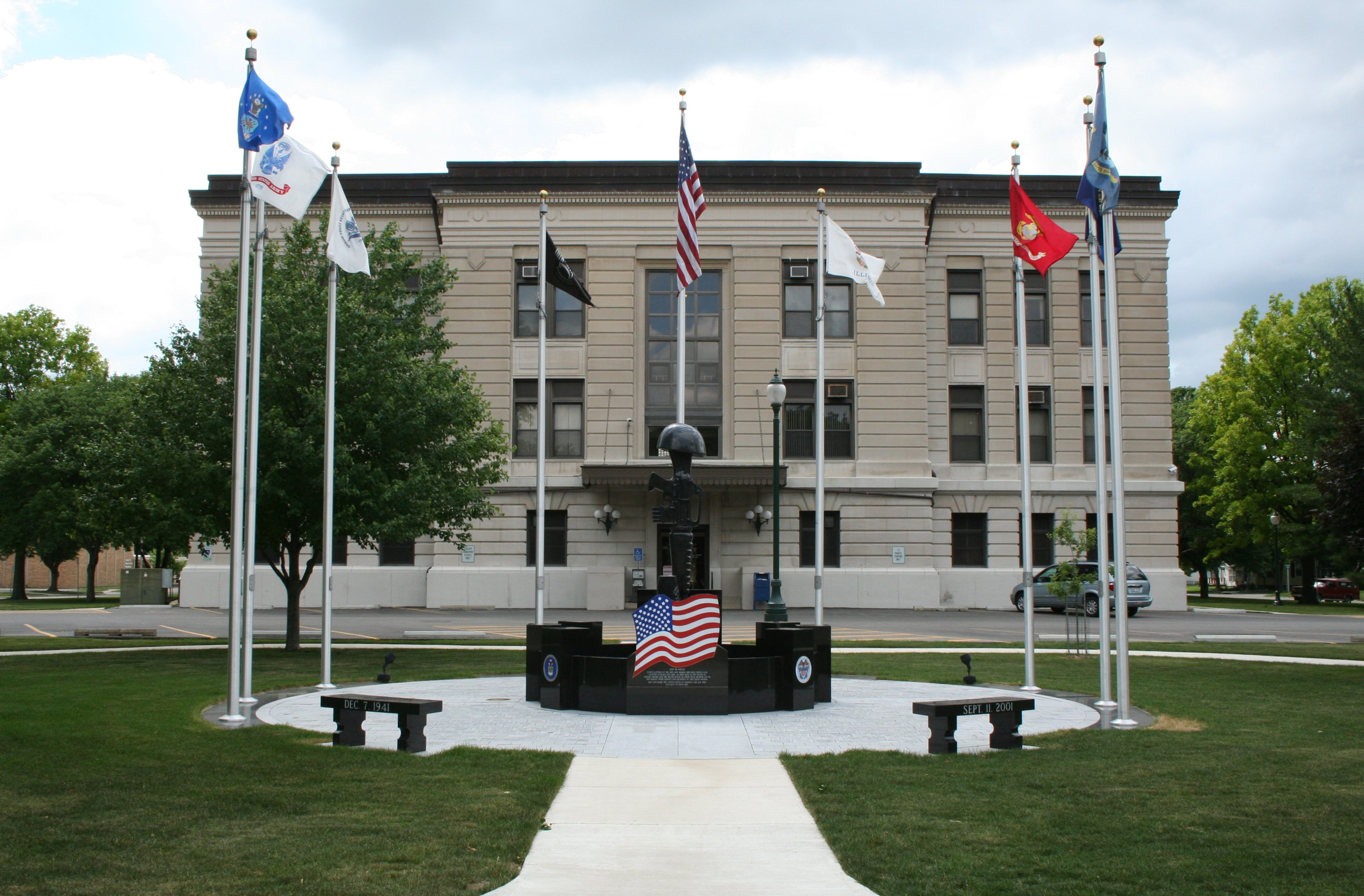
- Douglas County Courthouse and veterans' memorial

- Location within the U.S. state of Illinois
- Coordinates: 39°46′N 88°13′W
- Country: United States
- State: Illinois
- Founded: 1859
- Named for: Stephen A. Douglas
- Seat: Tuscola
- Largest city: Tuscola

Area
  - Total: 417 sq mi (1,080 km^{2})
  - Land: 416 sq mi (1,080 km^{2})
  - Water: 0.6 sq mi (1.6 km^{2}) 0.1%

Population (2020)
  - Total: 19,740
  - Estimate (2025): 19,880 ▲
  - Density: 47.8/sq mi (18.5/km^{2})
- Time zone: UTC−6 (Central)
  - Summer (DST): UTC−5 (CDT)
- Congressional district: 15th
- Website: douglascountyil.gov

Douglas County is a county located in the U.S. state of Illinois. As of the 2020 United States census, the population was 19,740. The county seat is Tuscola.

== History ==
Douglas County was formed in 1859 out of Coles County. It was named for Stephen A. Douglas, who was elected to the United States Senate in 1858, following the Lincoln–Douglas debates.

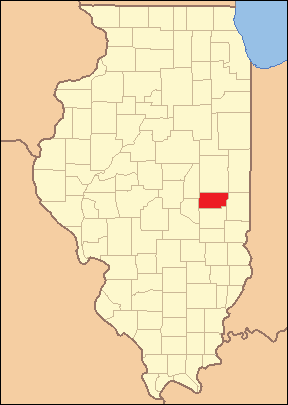
The creation of Douglas and Ford Counties in 1859 resulted in Illinois' current county map.

== Geography ==
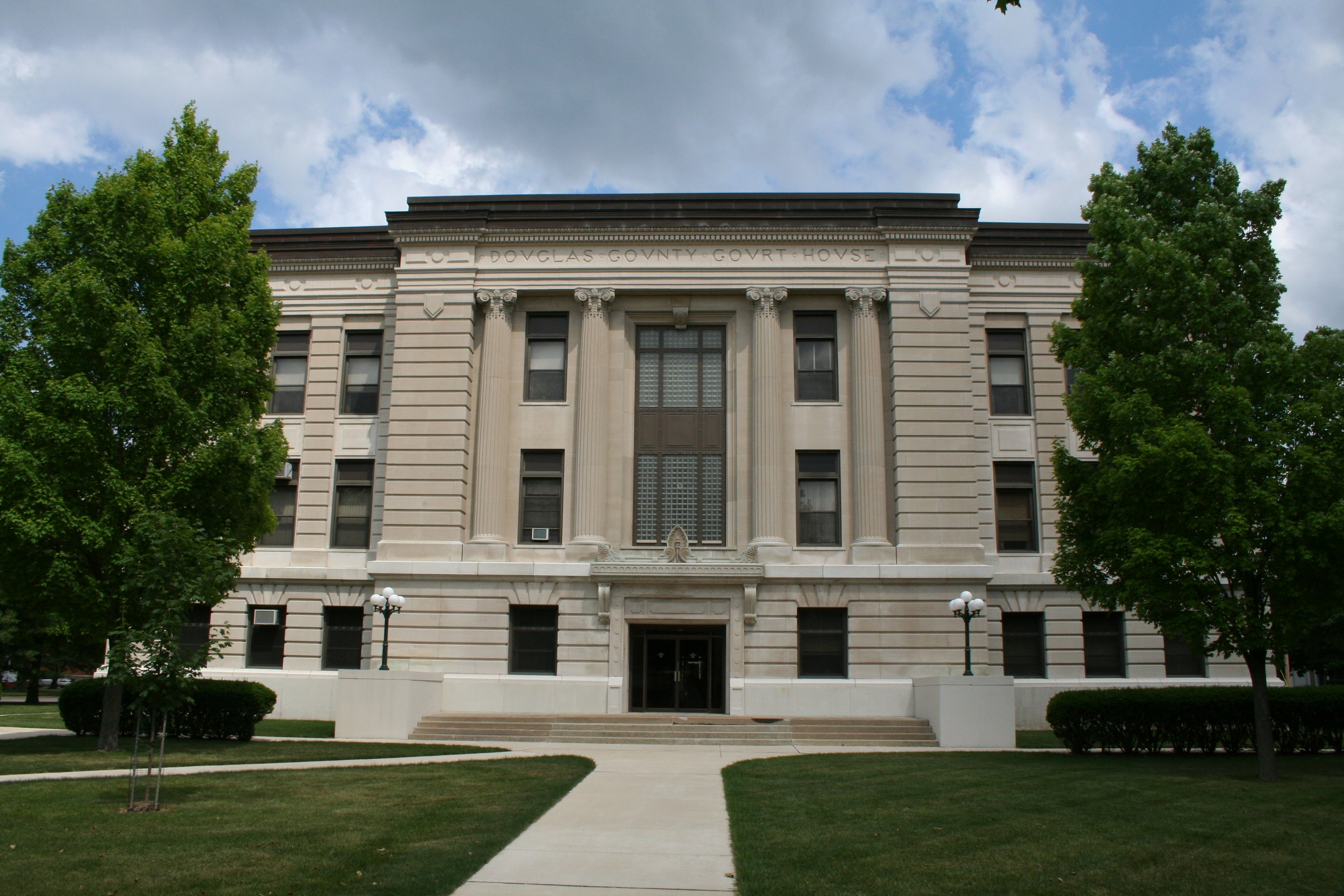
The west face of the Douglas County courthouse

According to the US Census Bureau, the county has a total area of 417 square miles (1,080 km^{2}), of which 416.4 square miles (1,078 km^{2}) is land and 0.6 square miles (1.6 km^{2}) (0.1%) is water.

=== Climate and weather ===
Tuscola, Illinois

Climate chart (precipitation, max. and min. temperature)
J	F	M	A	M	J	J	A	S	O	N	D
2.3 34 18	2.1 41 23	3.1 53 33	3.8 66 42	4 76 53	4.2 85 62	4.6 88 66	3.7 86 64	3.1 80 56	2.9 68 45	3.7 52 35	3.1 39 24
- █ Average max. and min. temperatures in °F
- █ Precipitation totals in inches
- Source: The Weather Channel
Metric conversion
J	F	M	A	M	J	J	A	S	O	N	D
58 1 −8	54 5 −5	80 12 1	98 19 6	101 24 12	105 29 17	118 31 19	95 30 18	80 27 13	73 20 7	95 11 2	77 4 −4
- █ Average max. and min. temperatures in °C
- █ Precipitation totals in mm

In recent years, average temperatures in the county seat of Tuscola have ranged from a low of 18 °F (−8 °C) in January to a high of 88 °F (31 °C) in July, although a record low of −26 °F (−32 °C) was recorded in December 1989 and a record high of 113 °F (45 °C) was recorded in July 1954. Average monthly precipitation ranged from 2.12 inches (54 mm) in February to 4.64 inches (118 mm) in July.

=== Adjacent counties ===
- Champaign County - north
- Vermilion County - northeast
- Edgar County - east
- Coles County - south
- Moultrie County - west
- Piatt County - northwest

=== Major highways ===
- Interstate 57
- US Route 36
- US Route 45
- Illinois Route 49
- Illinois Route 130
- Illinois Route 133

== Demographics ==
Historical population
Census	Pop.	Note	%±
1860	7,140		—
1870	13,484		88.9%
1880	15,853		17.6%
1890	17,669		11.5%
1900	19,097		8.1%
1910	19,591		2.6%
1920	19,604		0.1%
1930	17,914		−8.6%
1940	17,590		−1.8%
1950	16,706		−5.0%
1960	19,243		15.2%
1970	18,997		−1.3%
1980	19,774		4.1%
1990	19,464		−1.6%
2000	19,922		2.4%
2010	19,980		0.3%
2020	19,740		−1.2%
2025 (est.)	19,880	▲	0.7%
US Decennial Census:

2000 census age pyramid for Douglas County

=== 2020 census ===
As of the 2020 census, the county had a population of 19,740. The median age was 39.6 years, 24.8% of residents were under the age of 18, and 18.8% of residents were 65 years of age or older. For every 100 females there were 97.8 males, and for every 100 females age 18 and over there were 95.1 males age 18 and over.

The racial makeup of the county was 90.5% White, 0.3% Black or African American, 0.3% American Indian and Alaska Native, 0.5% Asian, <0.1% Native Hawaiian and Pacific Islander, 3.9% from some other race, and 4.4% from two or more races. Hispanic or Latino residents of any race comprised 7.9% of the population.

25.0% of residents lived in urban areas, while 75.0% lived in rural areas.

There were 7,749 households in the county, of which 31.1% had children under the age of 18 living in them. Of all households, 53.5% were married-couple households, 17.6% were households with a male householder and no spouse or partner present, and 23.1% were households with a female householder and no spouse or partner present. About 27.4% of all households were made up of individuals and 12.6% had someone living alone who was 65 years of age or older.

There were 8,469 housing units, of which 8.5% were vacant. Among occupied housing units, 74.6% were owner-occupied and 25.4% were renter-occupied. The homeowner vacancy rate was 1.6% and the rental vacancy rate was 7.8%.

=== Racial and ethnic composition ===
Douglas County, Illinois – Racial and ethnic composition Note: the US Census treats Hispanic/Latino as an ethnic category. This table excludes Latinos from the racial categories and assigns them to a separate category. Hispanics/Latinos may be of any race.
Race / Ethnicity (NH = Non-Hispanic)	Pop 1980	Pop 1990	Pop 2000	Pop 2010	Pop 2020	% 1980	% 1990	% 2000	% 2010	% 2020
White alone (NH)	19,491	19,102	18,993	18,427	17,420	98.57%	98.14%	95.34%	92.23%	88.25%
Black or African American alone (NH)	6	15	59	53	67	0.03%	0.08%	0.30%	0.27%	0.34%
Native American or Alaska Native alone (NH)	24	18	29	31	28	0.12%	0.09%	0.15%	0.16%	0.14%
Asian alone (NH)	34	37	49	82	103	0.17%	0.19%	0.25%	0.41%	0.52%
Native Hawaiian or Pacific Islander alone (NH)	x	x	2	0	6	x	x	0.01%	0.00%	0.03%
Other race alone (NH)	10	0	1	6	34	0.05%	0.00%	0.01%	0.03%	0.17%
Mixed race or Multiracial (NH)	x	x	99	171	517	x	x	0.50%	0.86%	2.62%
Hispanic or Latino (any race)	209	292	690	1,210	1,565	1.06%	1.50%	3.46%	6.06%	7.93%
Total	19,774	19,464	19,922	19,980	19,740	100.00%	100.00%	100.00%	100.00%	100.00%

=== 2010 census ===
As of the 2010 United States census, there were 19,980 people, 7,720 households, and 5,377 families living in the county. The population density was 48.0 inhabitants per square mile (18.5/km^{2}). There were 8,390 housing units at an average density of 20.1 per square mile (7.8/km^{2}). The racial makeup of the county was 95.7% white, 0.4% Asian, 0.3% black or African American, 0.2% American Indian, 2.3% from other races, and 1.2% from two or more races. Those of Hispanic or Latino origin made up 6.1% of the population. In terms of ancestry, 29.6% were German, 12.6% were American, 12.1% were English, and 10.7% were Irish.

Of the 7,720 households, 32.6% had children under the age of 18 living with them, 57.0% were married couples living together, 8.5% had a female householder with no husband present, 30.3% were non-families, and 26.1% of all households were made up of individuals. The average household size was 2.57 and the average family size was 3.11. The median age was 38.7 years.

The median income for a household in the county was $46,941 and the median income for a family was $60,352. Males had a median income of $41,318 versus $28,731 for females. The per capita income for the county was $21,438. About 7.1% of families and 10.2% of the population were below the poverty line, including 14.0% of those under age 18 and 7.2% of those age 65 or over.

== Communities ==
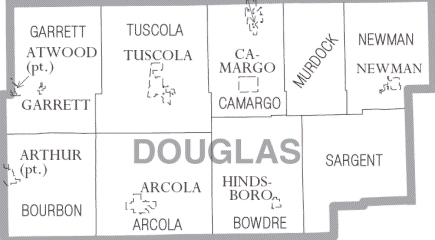
Map of Douglas County, Illinois

=== Cities ===
- Arcola
- Newman
- Tuscola (seat)
- Villa Grove

=== Villages ===
- Arthur (partial)
- Atwood (partial)
- Camargo
- Garrett
- Hindsboro

=== Unincorporated communities ===
- Bourbon
- Chesterville
- Chicken Bristle
- Fairland
- Ficklin
- Filson
- Hugo
- Hayes
- Hillcrest
- Kemp
- Murdock
- Patterson Springs

=== Townships ===
- Arcola
- Bourbon
- Bowdre
- Camargo
- Garrett
- Murdock
- Newman
- Sargent
- Tuscola

== Politics ==
Douglas is a strongly Republican county. Apart from a narrow plurality of thirty-two votes to Bill Clinton in 1992, it has voted Republican in every Presidential election since 1968, and in all but five overall since 1880. Despite its long-time Republican leanings, Hillary Clinton's 2016 performance of gaining a mere 23.8 percent of the county's vote stands over six percent worse than any Democrat since the Civil War.

United States presidential election results for Douglas County, Illinois
Year	Republican		Democratic		Third party(ies)	
Year	No.	%	No.	%	No.	%
1892	2,246	50.48%	1,999	44.93%	204	4.59%
1896	2,666	54.78%	2,140	43.97%	61	1.25%
1900	2,733	55.46%	2,106	42.74%	89	1.81%
1904	2,518	54.80%	1,685	36.67%	392	8.53%
1908	2,656	55.33%	1,917	39.94%	227	4.73%
1912	1,386	31.03%	1,633	36.56%	1,448	32.42%
1916	4,564	52.17%	3,768	43.07%	416	4.76%
1920	4,885	65.21%	2,308	30.81%	298	3.98%
1924	4,046	55.65%	2,315	31.84%	909	12.50%
1928	4,890	68.19%	2,239	31.22%	42	0.59%
1932	3,108	37.74%	4,954	60.15%	174	2.11%
1936	4,606	47.51%	5,029	51.88%	59	0.61%
1940	5,451	54.34%	4,513	44.99%	67	0.67%
1944	4,684	58.29%	3,323	41.36%	28	0.35%
1948	4,181	58.65%	2,893	40.58%	55	0.77%
1952	5,530	67.10%	2,706	32.84%	5	0.06%
1956	5,559	66.66%	2,774	33.27%	6	0.07%
1960	5,761	61.95%	3,532	37.98%	6	0.06%
1964	4,223	47.35%	4,695	52.65%	0	0.00%
1968	5,058	59.25%	2,824	33.08%	655	7.67%
1972	5,840	68.66%	2,656	31.23%	10	0.12%
1976	4,635	54.39%	3,826	44.90%	61	0.72%
1980	5,330	64.26%	2,564	30.91%	400	4.82%
1984	5,691	66.14%	2,886	33.54%	27	0.31%
1988	4,378	57.62%	3,184	41.91%	36	0.47%
1992	3,309	39.98%	3,341	40.37%	1,626	19.65%
1996	3,272	46.66%	2,955	42.14%	786	11.21%
2000	4,734	58.07%	3,215	39.44%	203	2.49%
2004	5,702	66.77%	2,767	32.40%	71	0.83%
2008	5,005	59.73%	3,228	38.52%	146	1.74%
2012	5,334	67.34%	2,430	30.68%	157	1.98%
2016	5,698	69.53%	1,949	23.78%	548	6.69%
2020	6,227	71.08%	2,335	26.66%	198	2.26%
2024	6,076	71.92%	2,198	26.02%	174	2.06%

== See also ==
- National Register of Historic Places listings in Douglas County, Illinois
