= Camargo, Illinois =

Camargo
- Village
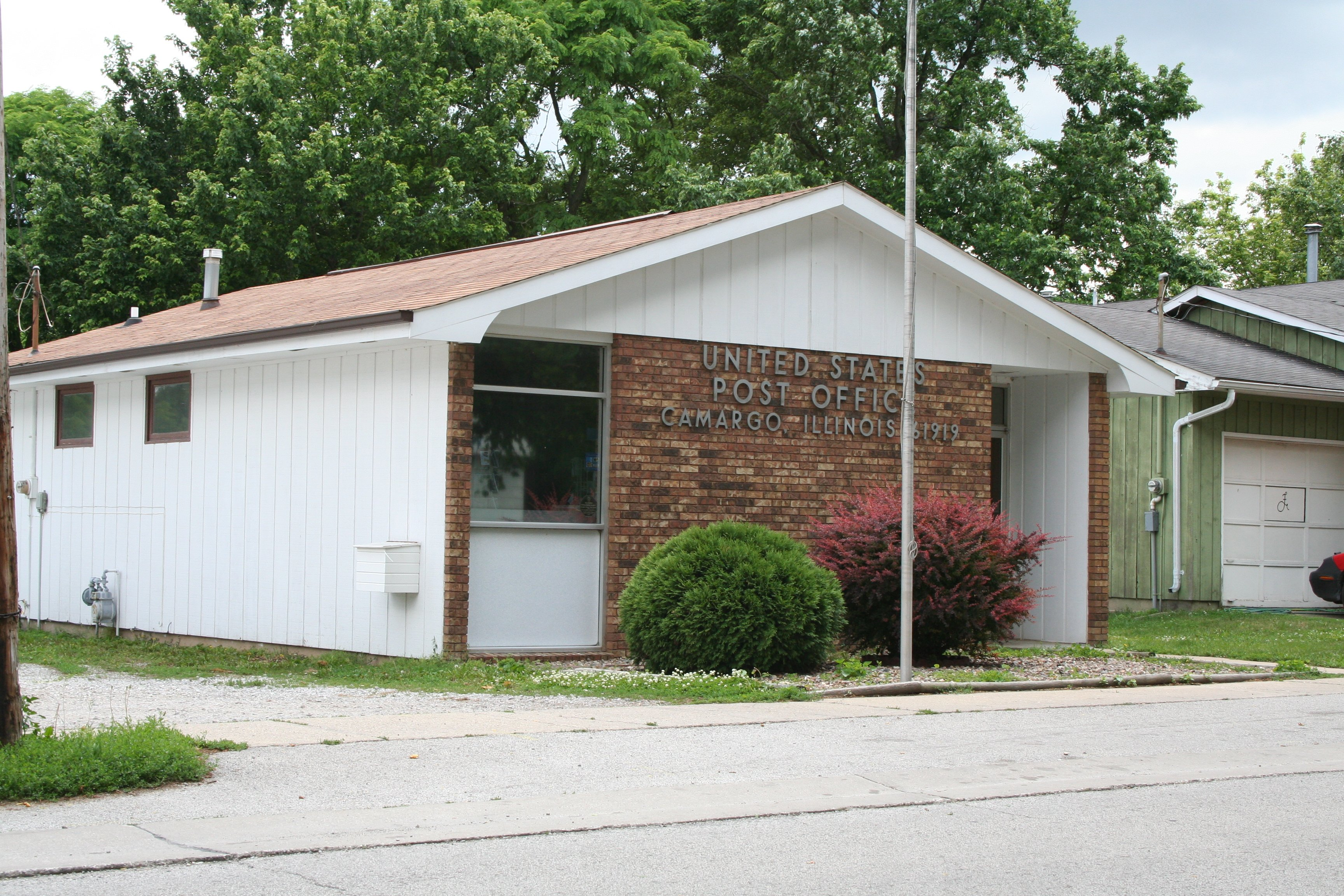
- Camargo, Illinois Post Office, 2007

- Location of Camargo in Douglas County, Illinois.
- Coordinates: 39°47′57″N 88°10′01″W
- Country: United States
- State: Illinois
- County: Douglas
- Township: Camargo

Area
  - Total: 1.27 sq mi (3.30 km^{2})
  - Land: 1.26 sq mi (3.26 km^{2})
  - Water: 0.012 sq mi (0.03 km^{2})
- Elevation: 643 ft (196 m)

Population (2020)
  - Total: 452
  - Density: 359.0/sq mi (138.61/km^{2})
- Time zone: UTC-6 (CST)
  - Summer (DST): UTC-5 (CDT)
- ZIP code: 61919
- Area code: 217
- FIPS code: 17-10591
- GNIS ID: 2397536
- Website: camargoinfo.com

Camargo is a village in Douglas County, Illinois, United States. The population was 452 at the 2020 census. Camargo is at the intersection of Illinois Route 130 and U.S. Route 36. Camargo is the oldest township in Douglas County.

== Geography ==
According to the 2010 census, Camargo has a total area of 1.273 square miles (3.30 km^{2}), of which 1.26 square miles (3.26 km^{2}) (or 98.98%) is land and 0.013 square miles (0.03 km^{2}) (or 1.02%) is water.

== Demographics ==
Historical population
Census	Pop.	Note	%±
1880	339		—
1910	323		—
1920	336		4.0%
1930	271		−19.3%
1940	257		−5.2%
1950	236		−8.2%
1960	276		16.9%
1970	241		−12.7%
1980	428		77.6%
1990	372		−13.1%
2000	469		26.1%
2010	445		−5.1%
2020	452		1.6%
U.S. Decennial Census

As of the 2020 census there were 452 people, 205 households, and 142 families residing in the village. The population density was 355.35 inhabitants per square mile (137.20/km^{2}). There were 200 housing units at an average density of 157.23 per square mile (60.71/km^{2}). The racial makeup of the village was 94.03% White, 0.22% Native American, 0.66% from other races, and 5.09% from two or more races. Hispanic or Latino of any race were 1.77% of the population.

There were 205 households, out of which 38.5% had children under the age of 18 living with them, 57.56% were married couples living together, 6.83% had a female householder with no husband present, and 30.73% were non-families. 25.85% of all households were made up of individuals, and 11.22% had someone living alone who was 65 years of age or older. The average household size was 3.24 and the average family size was 2.68.

The village's age distribution consisted of 22.7% under the age of 18, 4.2% from 18 to 24, 19.3% from 25 to 44, 32.9% from 45 to 64, and 20.9% who were 65 years of age or older. The median age was 46.9 years. For every 100 females, there were 87.1 males. For every 100 females age 18 and over, there were 83.2 males.

The median income for a household in the village was $60,469, and the median income for a family was $70,313. Males had a median income of $53,125 versus $24,375 for females. The per capita income for the village was $25,883. About 6.3% of families and 6.2% of the population were below the poverty line, including 10.4% of those under age 18 and 5.2% of those age 65 or over.

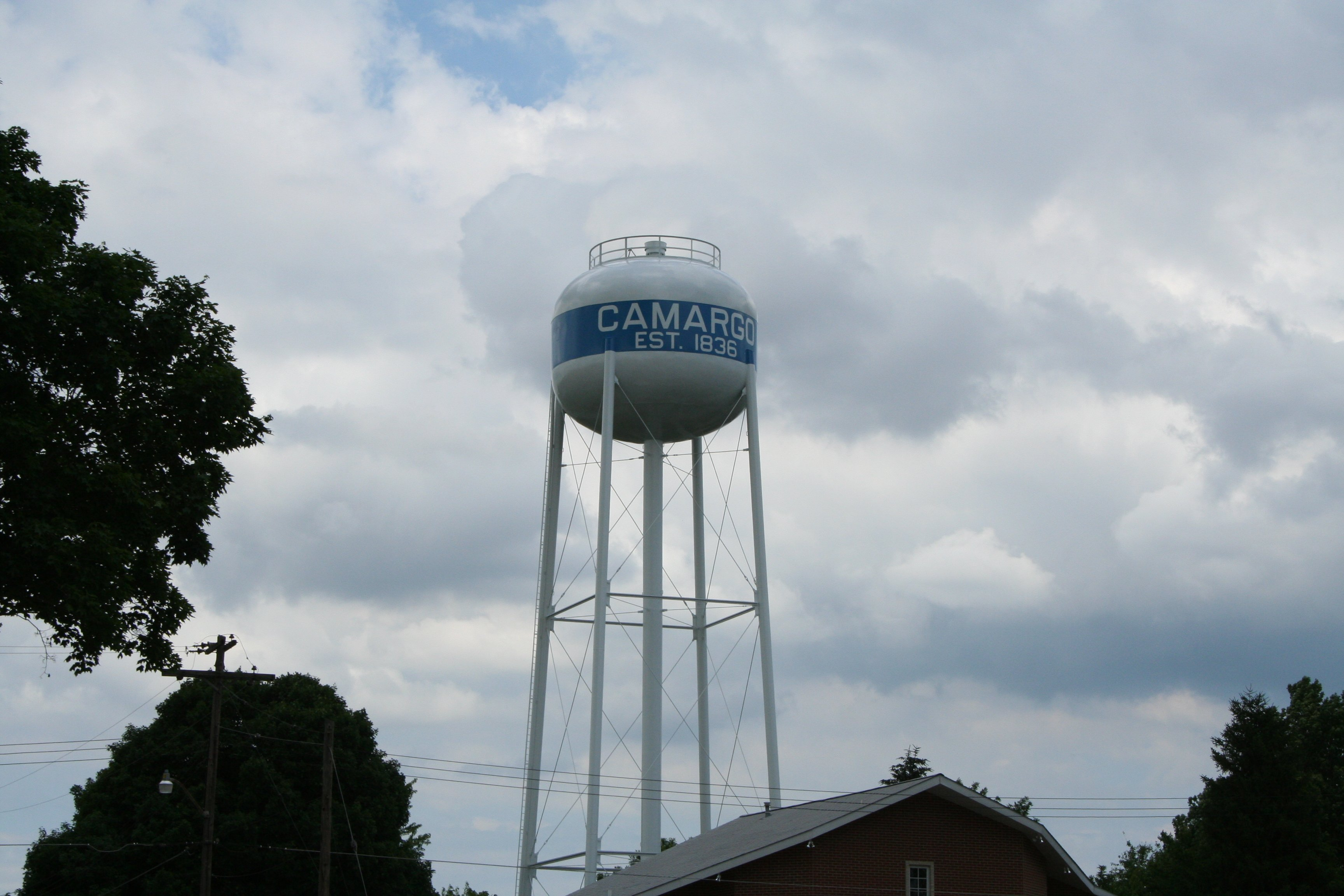
Camargo. Illinois Water Tower, 2007

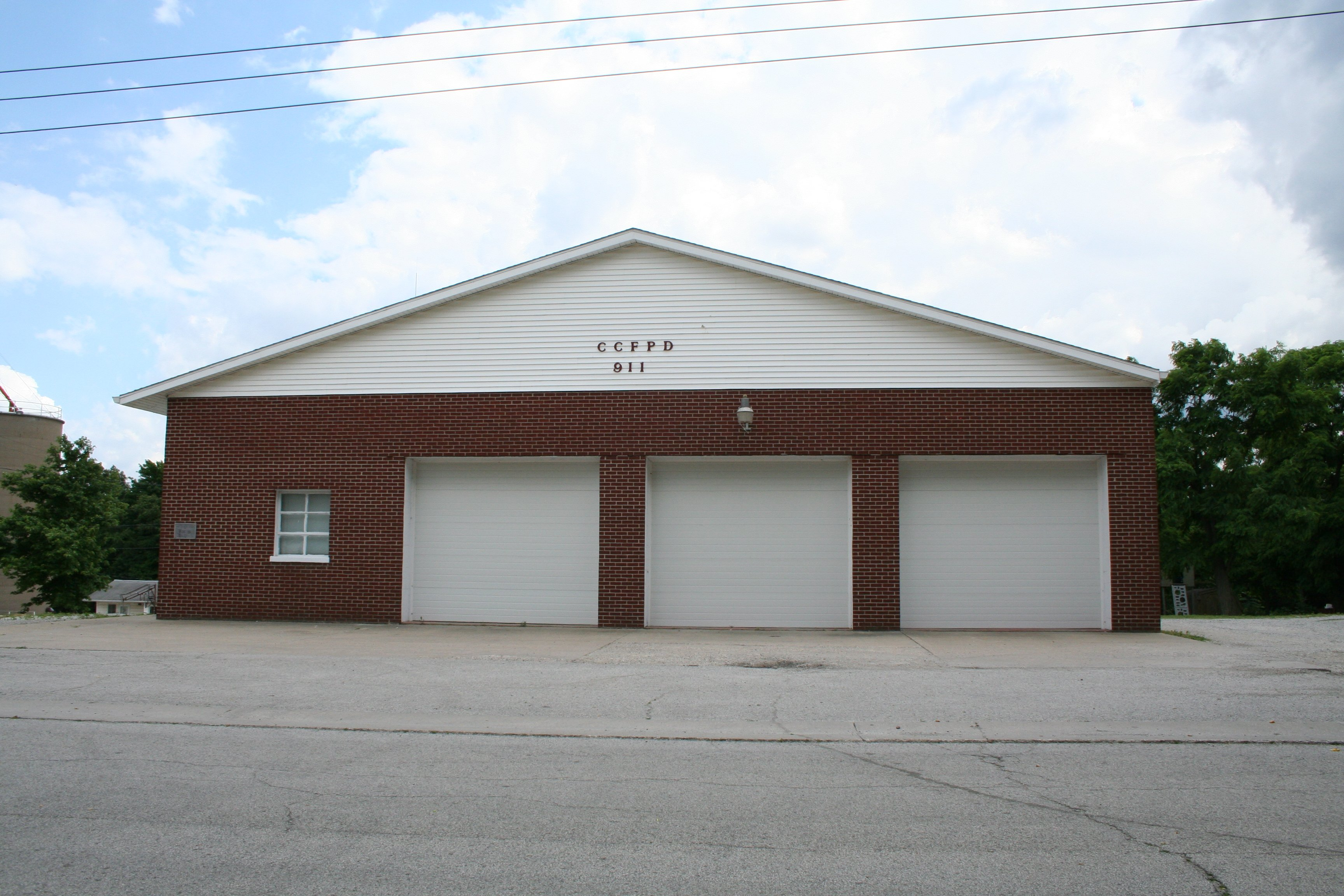
Camargo, Illinois Fire Station, 2007

== Transportation ==
Dial-A-Ride Public Transportation provides dial-a-ride bus transit service to the village. The nearest passenger rail service is at Illinois Terminal in Champaign, or Mattoon station in Mattoon, where Amtrak operates to Chicago, Carbondale, New Orleans, and other destinations.

== See also ==
- List of municipalities in Illinois
