= Collins House =

Collins House may refer to:

in Australia

- Collins House (Melbourne), a skyscraper at 464-466 Collins Street, Melbourne, Australia, completed in 2019
- Collins House Group, an informal alliance of companies, whose operations began at Broken Hill and who shared an office building at 360-366 Collins Street, Melbourne, from 1911 until 1951

in the United States

(by state then city)

- Collins-Marston House, Mobile, Alabama
- Collins-Robinson House, Mobile, Alabama
- Murphy-Collins House, Tuscaloosa, Alabama, listed on the National Register of Historic Places (NRHP)
- Dr. Frank Finney House, La Junta, Colorado, also known as the Hofmann-Collins House
- Collins Potato House, Laurel, Delaware
- Collins-Odom-Strickland House, Macon, Georgia, listed on the NRHP
- Daniel Dove Collins House, Collinsville, Illinois
- Collins House (Davenport, Iowa)
- Capt. N. Collins House District, Petersburg, Kentucky, listed on the NRHP
- Collins House (Todds Point, Kentucky), listed on the NRHP
- Jackson Collins House, Centreville, Maryland
- Collins Cottages Historic District, Eastham, Massachusetts
- Frederick Collins House, Newton, Massachusetts
- William Collins House (Fall River, Massachusetts)
- George H. Collins House, Tylertown, Mississippi, listed on the NRHP
- David Gordon House and Collins Log Cabin, Columbia, Missouri
- James V. Collins House, Anaconda, Montana, listed on the NRHP
- Timothy Edwards Collins Mansion, Great Falls, Montana
- Isaac Collins House, Burlington, New Jersey, listed on the NRHP
- Jonathan C. Collins House and Cemetery, Constableville, New York
- Nathaniel Bishop Collins House, Berkshire, New York
- Collins House (Syracuse, New York)
- George Collins House, Salem, Oregon, listed on the NRHP
- Collins Mansion, West Chester, Pennsylvania
- James E. Collins House, Franklin, Tennessee
- Collins House and Granary, Uniontown, Washington, listed on the NRHP
- John Collins House, Caledonia, Wisconsin, listed on the NRHP
- William Collins House (Madison, Wisconsin)

== See also ==
- William Collins House (disambiguation)
- Collins Building (disambiguation)
