= Jarvis House =

Jarvis House may refer to:

in the United States

(by state, then city/town)

- Laws-Jarvis House, Beebe, Arkansas, listed on the National Register of Historic Places (NRHP) in White County, Arkansas
- Benjamin Jarvis House, Pasadena, California, listed on the NRHP in Los Angeles County, California
- William W. Jarvis House, Troy, Illinois, listed on the NRHP in Madison County, Illinois
- Col. Charles and Mary Ann Jarvis Homestead, Ellsworth, Maine, listed on the NRHP in Hancock County, Maine
- The Jarvis, Cambridge, Massachusetts, listed on the NRHP in Middlesex County, Massachusetts
- Jarvis-Fleet House, Huntington, New York, listed on the NRHP in Suffolk County, New York
- Jones-Jarvis House, New Bern, North Carolina, listed on the NRHP in Craven County, North Carolina
- Jarvis House (Sparta, North Carolina), listed on the NRHP in Alleghany County, North Carolina
- Jarvis House (Chesterville, Ohio), listed on the NRHP in Morrow County, Ohio
- Anna Jarvis House, Webster, West Virginia, listed on the NRHP in Taylor County, West Virginia
