= Katie Stuart (politician) =

American politician

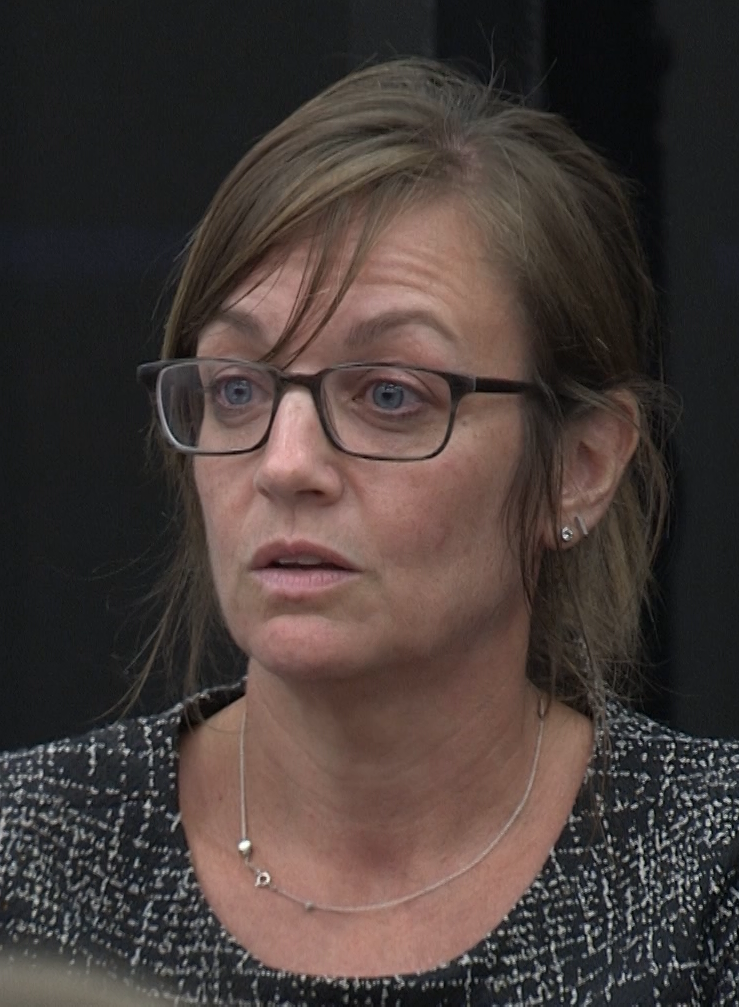

Member of the Illinois House of Representatives from the 112th district
- Incumbent
- Assumed office January 11, 2017
- Preceded by: Dwight Kay

Personal details
- Party: Democratic
- Spouse: Steve
- Children: 2
- Education: Southern Illinois University (MA); Rutgers University (BA)
- Profession: College instructor

Katie Kobak Stuart is a Democratic member of the Illinois House of Representatives from the 112th district. The 112th district, located in the Metro East, includes all or parts of Bethalto, Caseyville, Collinsville, Edwardsville, Fairmont City, Fairview Heights, Glen Carbon, Granite City, Madison, Maryville, O'Fallon, Pontoon Beach, Roxana, Shiloh, Swansea, and Wood River. Stuart, an Edwardsville resident, taught math at Southern Illinois University Edwardsville prior to taking office in the Illinois House of Representatives.

As of July 3, 2022, Stuart is a member of the following Illinois House committees:

- Appropriations - Higher Education Committee (HAPI)
- Election Administration & Ballot Access Subcommittee (SHEE-ELEC)
- Elementary & Secondary Education: School Curriculum & Policies Committee (HELM)
- Ethics & Elections Committee (SHEE) *Vice Chair*
- Firefighters and Fight Responders Subcommittee (SHPF-FIRE)
- Higher Education Committee (HHED) *Chair*
- Mental Health & Addiction Committee (HMEH)
- Police & Fire Committee (SHPF)

== Electoral history ==
Illinois' 112th representative district election results, 2016
Party	Candidate	Votes	%
Democratic	Katie Stuart	27,594	51.61
Republican	Dwight Kay (incumbent)	25,875	48.39
Total votes		53,469	100.0

Illinois' 112th representative district election results, 2018
Party	Candidate	Votes	%	±%
Democratic	Katie Stuart (incumbent)	24,807	55.07	+3.46%
Republican	Dwight Kay	20,239	44.93	−3.46%
Total votes		45,046	100.0	

Illinois' 112th representative district election results, 2020
Party	Candidate	Votes	%	±%
Democratic	Katie Stuart (incumbent)	31,050	53.67	−1.40%
Republican	Lisa Ciampoli	26,807	46.33	+1.40%
Total votes		57,857	100.0	

Illinois' 112th representative district election results, 2022
Party	Candidate	Votes	%	±%
Democratic	Katie Stuart (incumbent)	20,666	54.22	+0.55%
Republican	Jennifer M. Korte	17,450	45.78	−0.55%
Total votes		38,116	100.0	

Illinois' 112th representative district election results, 2024
Party	Candidate	Votes	%	±%
Democratic	Katie Stuart (incumbent)	28,373	54.64	+0.42%
Republican	Jay Keeven	23,555	45.36	−0.42%
Total votes		51,928	100.0	
