= Irving Dilliard =

American journalist and writer

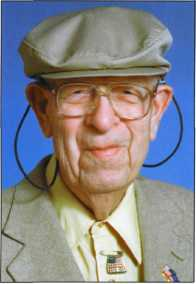
Image of Irving Dilliard

Irving Lee Dilliard (November 27, 1904 – October 9, 2002) was an American journalist and author. He was born in Collinsville, Illinois, and died in Glen Carbon, Illinois at the age of 97. Dilliard was the editor of the editorial page of the St. Louis Post-Dispatch newspaper from 1949 to 1957. Dilliard's editorials often advocated for expanded civil liberties and civil rights. Dilliard also wrote extensively on the Supreme Court of the United States.

== Journalism career ==
Dilliard began his career at the St. Louis Post-Dispatch in 1927 and was a reporter and editor there until 1938. In 1937, Dilliard wrote a series of articles for the Post-Dispatch "such as might have been written had an experienced newspaper correspondent been present" at the Constitutional Convention. These articles were compiled into a booklet titled "Building the Constitution" and distributed for free to public schools. Over 850,000 copies were in print. In 1938, Dilliard received a Nieman Fellowship to Harvard University. After the one-year program, Dilliard returned to the St. Louis Post-Dispatch as an editor. Dilliard then volunteered with the U.S. Army in 1943. Dilliard worked for the European edition of the Stars and Stripes newspaper and covered the Nuremberg Trials. After World War II ended, Dilliard returned to work for the St. Louis Post-Dispatch. He became editor of the editorial page in 1949. Dilliard wrote articles advocating for the civil rights and civil liberties of many individuals and groups, including George Anastaplo, Ellen Knauff, Jehovah’s Witnesses and communists. Dilliard wrote a series of editorials in 1954 titled “A War to Stay Out Of” arguing against U.S. involvement in what became the Vietnam War. In his career, Dilliard wrote over 10,000 total editorials and was called “the finest journalist to cover the U.S. Supreme Court” by U.S. Supreme Court Justice William O. Douglas. Dilliard stepped down as the St. Louis Post Dispatch editorial page editor in 1957 but continued to work at the newspaper until he retired fully in 1960.

== Post-journalism career ==
After retiring from the St. Louis Post-Dispatch in 1960, Dilliard served on the faculty of the Salzburg Seminar (Austria) in American Studies for one year. Dilliard was elected to the University of Illinois Board of Trustees in 1960 and served as a Trustee from 1961 to 1967. In 1963, Dilliard began teaching journalism at Princeton University. Dilliard left Princeton in 1973 to become the first director of the Illinois Department on Aging, where he served until 1975. In 1995, Dilliard served as an Illinois delegate to the White House Conference on Aging. Dilliard published many articles and essays in various journals and magazines, including The Atlantic, The New Republic, The University of Chicago Law Review, The American Scholar, The American Historical Review, The American Political Science Review, The Nation, and The Saturday Review; he also wrote nearly 100 entries in the Dictionary of American Biography. His published works include "The Spirit of Liberty: Papers and Addresses of Learned Hand" (editor, 1952); "Mr. Justice Brandeis: Great American" (author, 1941); "One Man's Stand for Freedom: Mr. Justice Black and the Bill of Rights" (editor, 1963); and "I'm From Missouri: Where Man and Mule Shaped the Heart of the Nation" (author, 1951), among others.

== Personal life ==
Dilliard was 13 years old in April of 1918 when German immigrant Robert Prager was hanged in Dilliard’s hometown of Collinsville, Illinois, leaving a lasting impression on Dilliard’s views of justice. While attending Collinsville High School, Dilliard wrote letters to many famous authors of the time, including F. Scott Fitzgerald, George Bernard Shaw, P.G. Wodehouse, Edgar Lee Masters, and Robert Frost, asking for their advice on how to become a writer. These authors’ responses grew to a collection of 120 handwritten letters, notes, and postcards, now housed at Southern Illinois University at Edwardsville (Lovejoy Library) with many of Dilliard's other papers, and available online. After graduating from Collinsville High School in 1923, Dilliard went to the University of Illinois at Urbana-Champaign, graduating from there with a Bachelor's Degree in 1927. Dilliard was married to Dorothy Dorris Dilliard for almost 62 years; she died in 1993. In 1998, Dilliard purchased and donated to the City of Collinsville a historic home located in Collinsville, Illinois, known as The Collins House or the Daniel Dove Collins House. Dilliard died at the age of 97 in Glen Carbon, Illinois, from complications associated with leukemia.
