= William Collins House =

William Collins House may refer to:

- William Collins House (Fall River, Massachusetts), listed on the National Register of Historic Places (NRHP)
- William Collins House (Madison, Wisconsin), NRHP-listed

== See also ==
- Collins House (disambiguation)
