= Glen Carbon, Illinois =

- Village
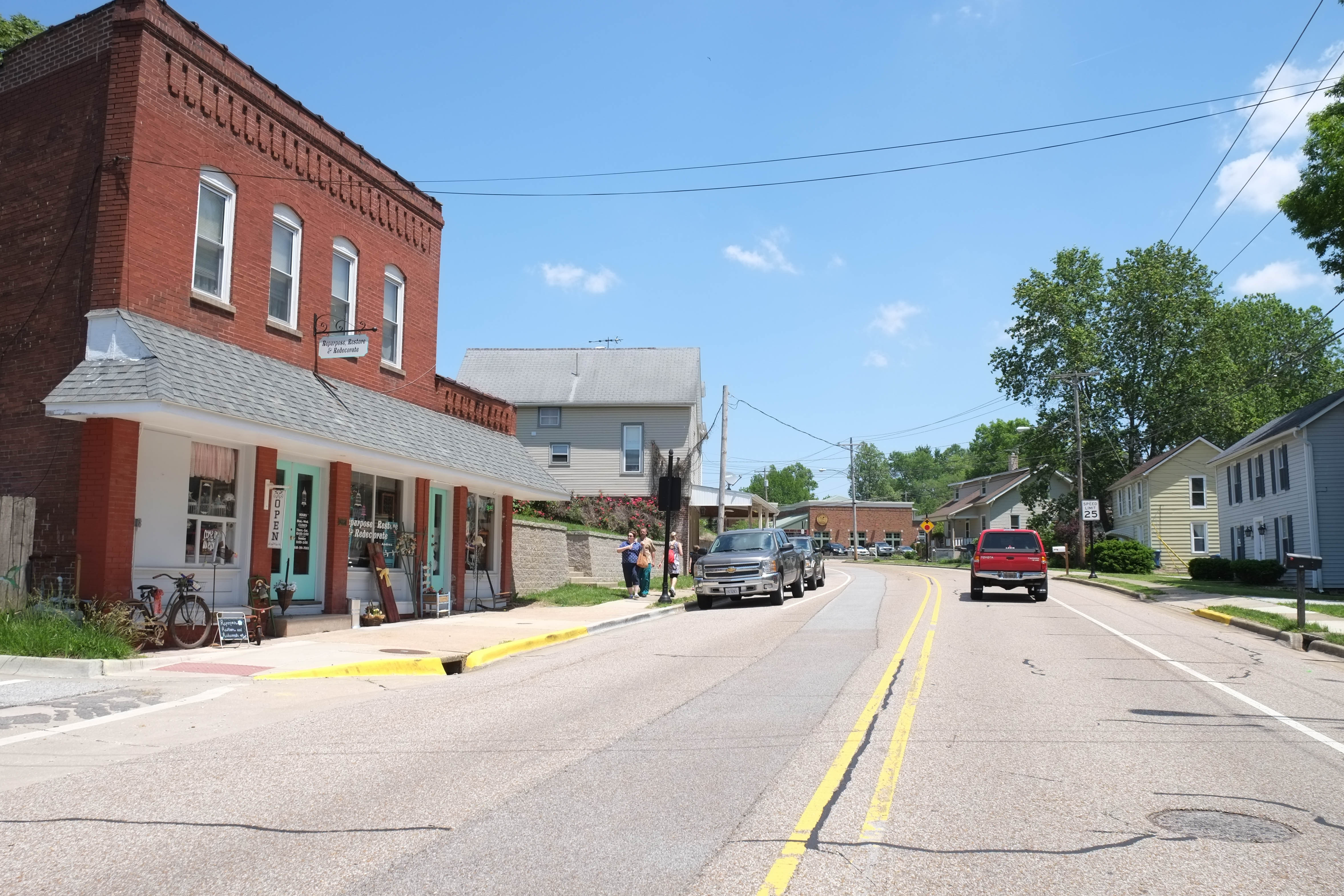
- Glen Carbon in May 2017

- Location in Madison County, Illinois
- Coordinates: 38°45′10″N 89°58′50″W
- Country: United States
- State: Illinois
- County: Madison
- Townships: Edwardsville, Collinsville, Pin Oak
- Founded: 1892

Area
  - Total: 10.37 sq mi (26.86 km^{2})
  - Land: 10.25 sq mi (26.56 km^{2})
  - Water: 0.12 sq mi (0.30 km^{2})
- Elevation: 499 ft (152 m)

Population (2020)
  - Total: 13,842
  - Density: 1,349.7/sq mi (521.11/km^{2})
- Time zone: UTC-6 (CST)
  - Summer (DST): UTC-5 (CDT)
- ZIP code: 62034
- Area code: 618
- FIPS code: 17-29639
- GNIS feature ID: 2398970
- Website: www.glencarbonil.gov

Glen Carbon is a village in Madison County, Illinois, United States, 14 miles (23 km) northeast of St. Louis. It is part of the St. Louis metropolitan area. The population was 13,842 at the 2020 census.

== History ==
In 1801, Colonel Samuel Judy received a military grant for 100 acres (0.40 km^{2}) of land near the base of the bluffs just north of Judys Branch, and became one of the first permanent settlers of Madison County. The land was called Goshen Settlement, after the biblical land of Goshen. It was renamed "Glen Carbon" to reflect its coal mining heritage.

Glen Carbon was incorporated as a village in 1892. It operated many coal mines until 1958. The Madison Coal Corp. that helped to found the town, shut down in 1931. Another industry was the St. Louis Press Brick Company, which burned down in 1906.

Glen Carbon residents served during World War I. The city's Doughboy statue, which honors the sacrifice made by two of its residents, has been selected as part of a national competition for restoration as part of the nation's World War I centennial activities. It is now featured in the book, "100 Cities, 100 Memorials."

Three railroads once served Glen Carbon. The Illinois Central Railroad, now the Ronald J. Foster Sr. Heritage Bike Trail, became one of the first rails to trails projects in the US, in 1992. The other two lines were the Norfolk Southern line and the Chicago and North Western line, which ran parallel with each other the entire way through Glen Carbon, and stopped operating in Glen Carbon in March 2000. The Nickel Plate Bike Trail follows both of those right-of-ways, switching back and forth between the NS and CNW lines the whole way through Glen Carbon.

=== Heritage Museum ===
Originally built in 1914, this building is located in the spot of the previous Glen Carbon School, established in 1890. That is why this street is named School Street in what is considered "Old Town" Glen Carbon.

Exhibits include:

- Artifacts that stress the importance of the railroads and coal mines
- Military memorabilia from Glen Carbon's veterans
- Local Business artifacts
- Historical photograph collection
- Baseball memorabilia
- Military memorabilia
- Native American stone tool collections
- Sewing and Quilting artifacts

=== Yanda Log Cabin ===
The Yanda Log Cabin is a satellite addition to the Heritage Museum. In February 2017, the cabin received a historical recognition plaque from the National Society Colonial Dames XVII Century organization. The Yanda Log Cabin was built around 1853 by William and Anna Zrala Yanda. They immigrated from Bohemia, Austria and plied their blacksmithing trade on this offshoot of the Goshen Road. The family handed the home down through the generations before selling it in the 1940s.

In 1989, the home was scheduled to serve as a practice burn for the local fire department. The Historical and Museum Commission found out about this and worked to save the building. The Village of Glen Carbon purchased the cabin so that it could be restored by volunteers and used as a gathering place for residents.

== Geography ==
Glen Carbon is located southwest of the center of Madison County. It is bordered to the north by Edwardsville, the county seat, to the southeast by Troy, to the south by Maryville, and to the west by Pontoon Beach. Interstate 270 passes through the village north of its center, with access from exits 9 and 12. I-270 leads west 19 miles (31 km) to Florissant, Missouri, and east 4 miles (6 km) to Interstate 70, which continues east 50 miles (80 km) to Vandalia. Illinois Route 157 passes through the west side of the village, leading northeast 6 miles (10 km) to the center of Edwardsville and south 5 miles (8 km) to the west side of Collinsville, while Illinois Route 159 passes through the east side of the village, leading north to the center of Edwardsville and south 6 miles (10 km) to the center of Collinsville.

According to the 2021 census gazetteer files, Glen Carbon village has a total area of 10.37 square miles (26.86 km^{2}), of which 10.25 square miles (26.55 km^{2}) (or 98.88%) is land and 0.12 square miles (0.31 km^{2}) (or 1.12%) is water. Judys Branch passes through the village just south of its center, leading west into the Mississippi River valley lowlands.

== Demographics ==
Historical population
Census	Pop.	Note	%±
1900	1,348		—
1910	1,220		−9.5%
1920	1,323		8.4%
1930	1,340		1.3%
1940	1,091		−18.6%
1950	1,176		7.8%
1960	1,241		5.5%
1970	1,897		52.9%
1980	5,197		174.0%
1990	7,731		48.8%
2000	10,425		34.8%
2010	12,934		24.1%
2020	13,842		7.0%
U.S. Decennial Census

As of the 2020 census there were 13,842 people, 5,118 households, and 3,503 families residing in the village. The population density was 1,335.33 inhabitants per square mile (515.57/km^{2}). There were 5,606 housing units at an average density of 540.81 per square mile (208.81/km^{2}), of which 5.7% were vacant. The homeowner vacancy rate was 1.6% and the rental vacancy rate was 10.1%. The racial makeup of the village was 80.63% White, 7.17% African American, 0.21% Native American, 2.26% Asian, 0.06% Pacific Islander, 1.02% from other races, and 8.65% from two or more races. Hispanic or Latino of any race were 5.80% of the population.

There were 5,118 households, out of which 34.9% had children under the age of 18 living with them, 49.30% were married couples living together, 13.50% had a female householder with no husband present, and 31.56% were non-families. 23.82% of all households were made up of individuals, and 12.31% had someone living alone who was 65 years of age or older. The average household size was 2.85 and the average family size was 2.41.

The village's age distribution consisted of 25.5% under the age of 18, 6.7% from 18 to 24, 25.3% from 25 to 44, 24.1% from 45 to 64, and 18.4% who were 65 years of age or older. The median age was 39.9 years. For every 100 females, there were 96.7 males. For every 100 females age 18 and over, there were 93.4 males.

The median income for a household in the village was $84,956, and the median income for a family was $111,417. Males had a median income of $63,529 versus $47,458 for females. The per capita income for the village was $45,687. About 3.0% of families and 7.2% of the population were below the poverty line, including 7.5% of those under age 18 and 2.6% of those age 65 or over.

Racial composition as of the 2020 census
Race	Number	Percent
White	11,161	80.6%
Black or African American	992	7.2%
American Indian and Alaska Native	29	0.2%
Asian	313	2.3%
Native Hawaiian and Other Pacific Islander	8	0.1%
Some other race	141	1.0%
Two or more races	1,198	8.7%
Hispanic or Latino (of any race)	803	5.8%

== Parks and recreation ==
The Village of Glen Carbon operates three parks and the Ronald J. Foster Sr. Heritage Trail, an 11-mile (18 km) trail dedicated to the former mayor in 1991. It follows the old Illinois Central Railroad right-of-way that once served Glen Carbon. In November 2021, Madison County Transit and the Glen Carbon Historical and Museum Commission worked to establish historical markers along the trail that highlight places of importance to Glen Carbon's early history. The signs include information about the sites and photos.

=== Miner Park ===
Miner Park is located in the Old Town section. The entrance to the park is located between the American Legion Post and the Glen Carbon Centennial Library. This is the main park in Glen Carbon, with direct access to the Nickel Plate Bike Trail, a 15-mile (24 km) trail that follows the old Chicago & North Western and Norfolk Southern rights-of-way. The CNW & NS Railroads served Glen Carbon until March 2000.

The facilities available are:

- Comfort stations
- Barbecue grills
- Passive areas to view wildlife
- Variety of playground equipment
- Natural sledding hill
- Sheltered pavilions
- Band stand for special events
- Lighted baseball fields
- Old caboose with signal

=== Schon Park ===
Schon Park is the newest park in Glen Carbon. It was opened in 2013, with pavilions, benches, a walking trail and a pond within its limits. The park sits on 36 acres of land, across from St. Cecelia Church and Village Hall on Glen Carbon Road. The ground breaking for the second phase of the park was on May 25, 2018. The second phase construction will include the building of concrete paths, parking lot, underground utilities, a restroom facility and playground. The final plan for the park includes bicycle and walking trails, baseball diamond, batting cages, basketball and tennis courts, splash pad, toddler playground and concession stand.

=== Village Hall Park ===
Village Hall Park is a 3-acre (12,000 m^{2}) facility located directly behind the Village Hall at 151 North Main Street. This park is the main sporting and recreational complex in Glen Carbon.

=== Citizen Park ===
Citizen Park was formerly located behind Fire Station #1 and off Main Street in Old Town. It is now the newly remodeled Fire Station #1. Its groundbreaking ceremony took place on September 18, 2018. The entrance to the Ronald J. Foster Sr. Heritage Trail remains open and available.

=== Glen Carbon Centennial Library ===
In 2002 village residents passed a $2.6 million bond issue to build a new library. After nearly two years of construction, the library opened its 14,000 square foot facility on October 4, 2004, located on Main Street adjacent to the town's historic covered bridge. The library was featured in the Spring 2006 ILA Reporter article highlighting innovative library buildings, and was named the Bill & Melinda Gates Foundation and Library Journal's Best Small Library in America 2010.

== Education ==
Glen Carbon is served by the Edwardsville Community Unit District 7 School System of elementary, middle and high school education. It is one of the top-rated school districts in Illinois, educating students since 1864.

Glen Carbon is also home to Father McGivney Catholic High School, which was established in 2012. In 2015, the school earned its first state title in Bass Fishing.

== Notable people ==
- Glenn Bradford, Illinois politician and lawyer
- A. J. Epenesa, University of Iowa football defensive lineman
- Johnny Lucas, outfielder for the Boston Red Sox; born in Glen Carbon
- Nick Holonyak, Jr., electronics engineer, raised in Glen Carbon
