= Troy, Illinois =

- City
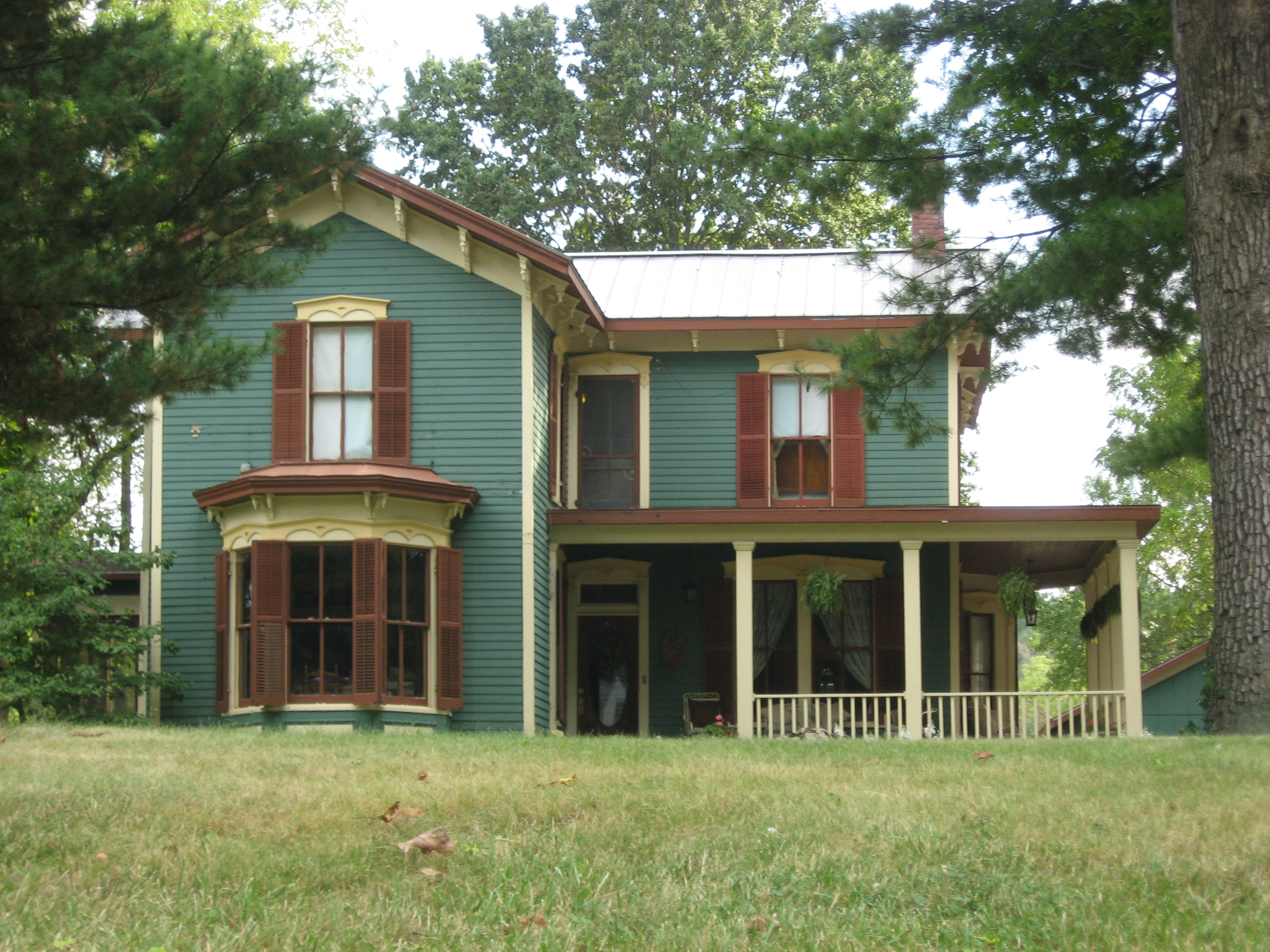
- William W. Jarvis House

- Location in Madison County, Illinois
- Coordinates: 38°43′05″N 89°52′35″W
- Country: United States
- State: Illinois
- County: Madison
- Townships: Jarvis, Pin Oak

Area
  - Total: 5.67 sq mi (14.69 km^{2})
  - Land: 5.62 sq mi (14.56 km^{2})
  - Water: 0.054 sq mi (0.14 km^{2})
- Elevation: 558 ft (170 m)

Population (2020)
  - Total: 10,960
  - Density: 1,950.2/sq mi (752.96/km^{2})
- Time zone: UTC-6 (CST)
  - Summer (DST): UTC-5 (CDT)
- ZIP code: 62294
- Area code: 618
- FIPS code: 17-76199
- GNIS feature ID: 2397061
- Website: www.troyil.us

Troy is a city in Madison County, Illinois, United States. The population was 10,960 at the 2020 census, up from 9,888 in 2010.

Troy is part of the St. Louis Metropolitan Statistical Area. Its namesake in Lincoln County, Missouri, is also part of this MSA, making it (along with the two O'Fallons in Illinois and Missouri) one of the few pairs of like-named municipalities to be part of the same MSA.

== History ==
Troy was platted in 1819. It was incorporated as a town on February 18, 1857, and as a city in 1892.

== Geography ==
Troy is located in south-central Madison County and is bordered to the west by Maryville and to the northwest by Glen Carbon.

Interstates 55 and 70 pass through the west side of Troy, with access from exits 17 and 18. The highways together lead southwest 20 miles (32 km) to St. Louis, while diverging just north of Troy: I-55 leads north 75 miles (121 km) to Springfield, the state capital, while I-70 leads east 50 miles (80 km) to Vandalia. U.S. Route 40 passes through the south side of Troy, joining I-55 and I-70 at the western edge of the city and leading east 11 miles (18 km) to Highland. Illinois Route 162 passes through the center of Troy as Center Street, Market Street, and Edwardsville Road, leading east 2.5 miles (4.0 km) to US 40 and west 4 miles (6 km) to the north part of Maryville.

According to the 2021 census gazetteer files, Troy has a total area of 5.67 square miles (14.69 km^{2}), of which 5.62 square miles (14.56 km^{2}) (or 99.08%) is land and 0.05 square miles (0.13 km^{2}) (or 0.92%) is water. Most of the city drains eastward into tributaries of Silver Creek, a south-flowing tributary of the Kaskaskia River. The westernmost part of the city drains to Canteen Creek, which flows southwest to the Mississippi River valley at East St. Louis.

== Demographics ==
Historical population
Census	Pop.	Note	%±
1880	648		—
1890	826		27.5%
1900	1,080		30.8%
1910	1,447		34.0%
1920	1,312		−9.3%
1930	1,122		−14.5%
1940	1,154		2.9%
1950	1,260		9.2%
1960	1,778		41.1%
1970	2,144		20.6%
1980	3,772		75.9%
1990	6,046		60.3%
2000	8,524		41.0%
2010	9,888		16.0%
2020	10,960		10.8%
U.S. Decennial Census

As of the 2020 census there were 10,960 people, 3,934 households, and 2,741 families residing in the city. The population density was 1,932.30 inhabitants per square mile (746.07/km^{2}). There were 4,510 housing units at an average density of 795.13 per square mile (307.00/km^{2}), of which 4.5% were vacant. The homeowner vacancy rate was 1.0% and the rental vacancy rate was 5.4%. The racial makeup of the city was 88.60% White, 2.54% African American, 0.27% Native American, 0.93% Asian, 0.02% Pacific Islander, 0.78% from other races, and 6.85% from two or more races. Hispanic or Latino of any race were 3.26% of the population.

There were 3,934 households, out of which 33.1% had children under the age of 18 living with them, 58.01% were married couples living together, 7.68% had a female householder with no husband present, and 30.33% were non-families. 27.76% of all households were made up of individuals, and 12.15% had someone living alone who was 65 years of age or older. The average household size was 3.12 and the average family size was 2.53.

The city's age distribution consisted of 25.2% under the age of 18, 5.8% from 18 to 24, 29.2% from 25 to 44, 27.7% from 45 to 64, and 12.1% who were 65 years of age or older. The median age was 37.1 years. For every 100 females, there were 80.6 males. For every 100 females age 18 and over, there were 80.9 males.

The median income for a household in the city was $76,672, and the median income for a family was $98,961. Males had a median income of $62,893 versus $39,031 for females. The per capita income for the city was $34,051. About 5.8% of families and 7.0% of the population were below the poverty line, including 5.2% of those under age 18 and 11.1% of those age 65 or over.

Racial composition as of the 2020 census
Race	Number	Percent
White	9,711	88.6%
Black or African American	278	2.5%
American Indian and Alaska Native	30	0.3%
Asian	102	0.9%
Native Hawaiian and Other Pacific Islander	2	0.0%
Some other race	86	0.8%
Two or more races	751	6.9%
Hispanic or Latino (of any race)	357	3.3%

== Education ==
Troy is served by Triad Community Unit School District 2, which operates Henning Elementary School, Silver Creek Elementary School, and Triad High School in the city.

== Notable people ==
- Paul Simon, US senator
- Jesse L. Simpson, Chief Justice of the Illinois Supreme Court; born in Troy
- Bob Turley, 1958 Cy Young Award-winning baseball pitcher
- Marcy Walker, actress; graduated from Triad High School
