= Jay Hoffman (politician) =

American politician (born 1961)

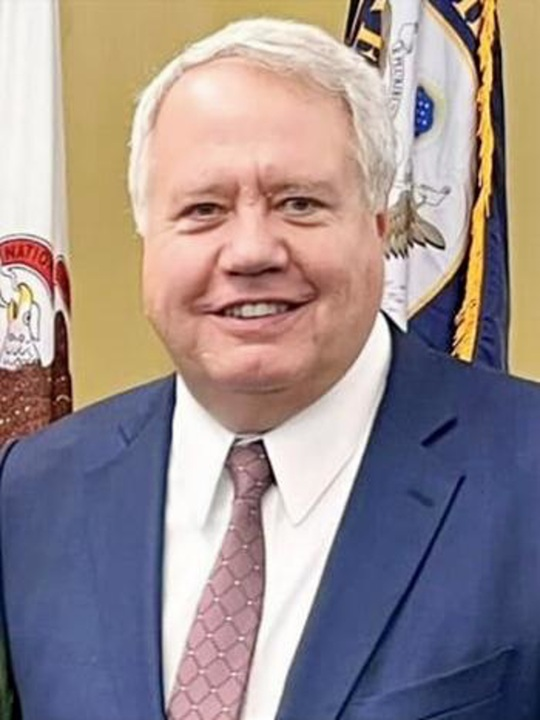
- Hoffman in 2023

Member of the Illinois House of Representatives from the 113th district
- Incumbent
- Assumed office January 9, 2013
- Preceded by: Scott Penny

Member of the Illinois House of Representatives from the 112th district
- In office October 28, 1997 – January 11, 2011
- Preceded by: Glenn Bradford
- Succeeded by: Dwight Kay
- In office January 9, 1991 – January 7, 1997
- Preceded by: Ron Stephens
- Succeeded by: Glenn Bradford

Personal details
- Born: November 6, 1961 (age 65) Highland, Illinois, U.S.
- Party: Democratic
- Spouse: Laurie
- Children: 2
- Education: Illinois State University (BS); Saint Louis University (JD)

Jay C. Hoffman (born November 6, 1961) is a Democratic member of the Illinois House of Representatives, representing the 113th district. He previously served from 1991 to 2011, with a nine-month interruption in 1997.

== Early life and career ==
Jay C. Hoffman was born on November 6, 1961 in Highland, Illinois. Hoffman received his B.S. in finance from Illinois State University. While at Illinois State University, Hoffman was a catcher for the ISU Redbirds baseball team and team captain his senior year. He later graduated from Saint Louis University School of Law. He served as an assistant state's attorney in St. Clair County and later as director of probation and court services in the 20th Judicial Circuit.

In 2010, Hoffman authored "Hope from the Heartland: Jobs, Clean Air, Energy Security" which provides a blueprint for utilizing the state's natural resources to create jobs and reduce dependence on foreign oil. outlines his plan on how the Midwest can lead the nation in research and the production of alternative energy by utilizing the Midwestern states' natural resources to create jobs in the declining manufacturing sector.

== Legislative career ==
=== First tenure ===
In 1988, Hoffman challenged Republican incumbent Ron Stephens, losing by 1,500 votes. In the most expensive race of the 1990 cycle, Hoffman defeated Stephens in a rematch. After just four years in the Illinois General Assembly, Jay was promoted to floor leader for the House Democrats and later became Chairman of the House Transportation and Motor Vehicles Committee, where he served for five terms. Jay also served on the committees of Judicial I (Civil Law), Judicial II (Criminal Law), Labor, Consumer Affairs, Railroad Safety, appropriations committees, and several other committees and task forces. In 1996, in lieu of running for reelection, Hoffman opted to run for the open seat in Illinois's 20th congressional district. The Republican candidate and Madison County Treasurer John Shimkus narrowly defeated Hoffman in the general election with 120,926 votes to Hoffman's 119,688 votes. Hoffman was succeeded in the Illinois House of Representatives by Glenn Bradford.

=== Second tenure ===
Bradford resigned from the Illinois House of Representatives on October 10, 1997. Hoffman was appointed to fill the vacancy and took office October 28, 1997. He helped pass the state's first capital construction plan in more than a decade, which spent hundreds of millions of dollars for new buildings at Illinois State University, University of Illinois, and Southern Illinois University Edwardsville. He helped pass the state's first capital construction plan in more than a decade, which spent hundreds of millions of dollars for new buildings at Illinois State University, University of Illinois, and Southern Illinois University Edwardsville.

During this time, Hoffman served as floor leader for the House Democrats, and chaired the House Transportation and Motor Vehicles Committee for five terms. Hoffman, a past House colleague of Rod Blagojevich, also served as the Governor's "floor leader". In early 2009 Hoffman voted in favor of the impeachment of the former Governor. Hoffman lost reelection to Republican candidate Dwight Kay in the 2010 general election.

=== Third tenure ===
In 2011, Hoffman explored a run for Congress in the newly-drawn Illinois's 13th congressional district, a Democratic-leaning district which stretched from Urbana-Champaign to the Metro-East. However, in October 2011, Hoffman announced he would instead run for election to the Illinois House of Representatives from the 113th district. Hoffman was elected in the 2012 general election. After Michael Madigan stepped down as the Speaker of the Illinois House of Representatives, Hoffman ran for the position, receiving 15 votes on the first ballot to eventual Speaker Chris Welch's 51 votes. Upon assuming the speakership, Welch named Hoffman as an Assistant Majority Leader.

== Awards and honors ==
Awards and honors Jay received for his work in the Illinois General Assembly include the Illinois Hospital Association's Legislator of the Year award, Outstanding Legislator from the Illinois State's Attorney's Association (two years), Illinois Public Transportation Association Legislator of the Year, RCGA Lewis and Clark Statesman Award (six years), St. Louis Children's Hospital State Advocate of the Year Award, Award for Outstanding Contributions to the Veterans of Illinois, the Appreciation of Dedication to Children of Illinois from the IEA, Cardinal Glennon's Crystal Wagon Award, IEA-NEA Region 45 Political Excellence Award, Southwestern Illinois Development Authority's Outstanding Individual of the Year, and the Associated Fire Fighters' Legislator of the Year Award.
