= Glenn Bradford =

American politician

Glenn E. Bradford (born January 31, 1947) is an American politician and lawyer. He served as a Democratic member in the Illinois House of Representatives from January 1997 to October 1997.

== Political career ==
When Jay Hoffman announced his candidacy for Illinois's 20th congressional district, Bradford ran to succeed Hoffman in the 112th district in the Illinois House of Representatives. In the 1996 general election, he defeated Republican nominee Mario Garcia by 1,500 votes. Bradford served in the Illinois House of Representatives from January 1997 until his resignation from the Illinois General Assembly in October 1997. He resigned to focus on the practice of law, but was rumored to have lost the confidence of party leadership. While in the General Assembly, he served as a member of the Legislative Space Needs Commission, a commission responsible for providing the legislature with the most funcitional facilities possible. Bradford resigned from the Illinois House of Representatives on October 10, 1997. After Bradford's resignation, Hoffman was appointed to fill the vacancy. Hoffman took office October 28, 1997.

== Legal career ==
Born in Granite City, Illinois, Bradford graduated from Southern Illinois University in 1971 and Emory University in 1974. He was admitted to the Illinois bar in 1974. He practiced law in Glen Carbon, Illinois. He served as the President of the Madison County Bar Association.
