= Jesse L. Simpson =

American judge

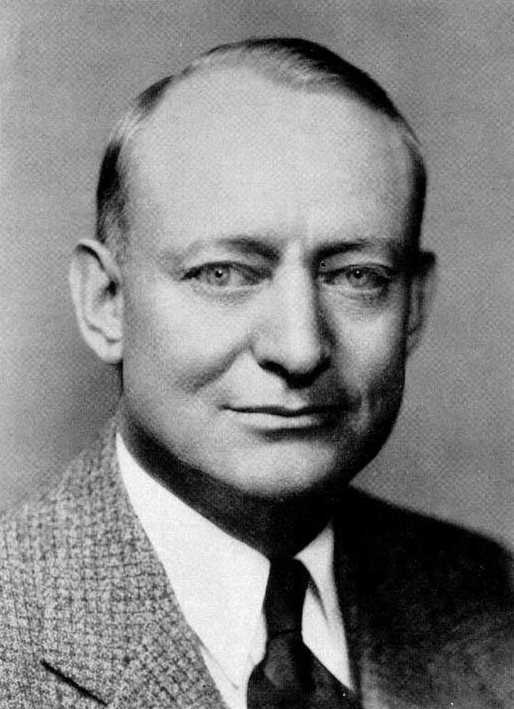
Simpson's official photograph, c. 1949.

Jesse Leander Simpson (January 13, 1884 – May 7, 1973) was an American jurist.

Born in Troy, Illinois, Simpson grew up on a farm and worked as a telegraph operator. In 1909, he received his law degree from Illinois Wesleyan University and was admitted to the Illinois bar. Simpson practiced law in Edwardsville, Illinois and was the city attorney for Edwardsville. He served as master in chancery for Madison County, Illinois and in 1947 served as county judge for Madison County. Simpson also served on the Edwardsville Board of Education and was president of the board. Simpson was also involved in the banking and savings and loan businesses. From 1947 to 1951, Simpson served on the Illinois Supreme Court and was the chief justice of the court. Simpson died in Highland, Illinois.
