= James O. Monroe =

American newspaper editor and politician

Member of the Illinois Senate
- In office 1955–1963
- In office 1931–1939

Member of the Illinois House of Representatives
- In office 1945–1947

Personal details
- Born: November 4, 1888 Jefferson County, Illinois, U.S.
- Died: June 17, 1968 (aged 79) Normandy, Missouri, U.S.
- Party: Democratic
- Education: Illinois College
- Profession: Politician, newspaper editor

James O. Monroe (November 4, 1888 – June 17, 1968) was an American newspaper editor and politician.

Monroe was born in Jefferson County, Illinois. He went to Ewing Academy and to Illinois College. He was the city editor and managing editor of the Jacksonville Courier in Jacksonville, Illinois in 1911 and 1915. Monroe was also involved with the typographic labor union in Edwardsville, Illinois. In 1913, Monroe was the manager of the United Press International in Springfield, Illinois. In 1917, Monroe became the owner of the Collinsville Herald in Collinsville, Illinois. He lived in Collinsville, Illinois with his wife and family. Monroe served in the Illinois Senate from 1931 to 1939 and from 1955 to 1963. He also served in the Illinois House of Representatives from 1945 to 1947. He was a Democrat. Monroe died at a nursing home in Normandy, Missouri.
