= Collins Building =

Collins Building may refer to:

- Collins Building (Boston, Massachusetts), listed on the U.S. National Register of Historic Places (NRHP)
- Collins Building (Colville, Washington), NRHP-listed in Stevens County
- North Coast Casket Company Building, also known as the Collins Building (Everett, Washington)
- Collins Building (Seattle, Washington)

== See also ==
- Collins House (disambiguation)
