= Dwight Kay =

American politician

Member of the Illinois House of Representatives from the 112th district
- In office January 2011 – January 2017
- Preceded by: Jay Hoffman
- Succeeded by: Katie Stuart

Personal details
- Born: May 5, 1947 (age 79) Wheaton, Illinois
- Party: Republican
- Spouse: Nancy Kay
- Children: One son One daughter
- Education: Taylor University

Dwight Kay (born May 5, 1947) is a former Republican member of the Illinois General Assembly.

Kay is a 1970 graduate of Taylor University. Kay served as Vice President for Cassens Transport. He unsuccessfully ran for the General Assembly in 2008 and was involved in the effort to impeach Illinois Governor Rod Blagojevich. He was elected to the Illinois General Assembly in 2010.

Kay then lost his seat in the 2016 election with 48.4% of the vote, to Katie Stuart's 51.6%.

In the 2004 election, Dwight Kay served as the finance chairman for the successful campaign of Lloyd A. Karmeier for a seat on the Supreme Court of Illinois.

== Electoral history ==
Illinois 112th State House District General Election, 2008
Party	Candidate	Votes	%
Democratic	Jay C. Hoffman (incumbent)	31,947	57.30
Republican	Dwight D. Kay	23,805	42.70
Total votes		55,752	100.0

Illinois 112th State House District General Election, 2010
Party	Candidate	Votes	%
Republican	Dwight D. Kay	19,689	51.63
Democratic	Jay C. Hoffman (incumbent)	18,449	48.37
Total votes		38,138	100.0

Illinois 112th State House District General Election, 2012
Party	Candidate	Votes	%
Republican	Dwight D. Kay (incumbent)	24,531	50.34
Democratic	Marleen Suarez	24,202	49.66
Total votes		48,733	100.0

Illinois 112th State House District General Election, 2014
Party	Candidate	Votes	%
Republican	Dwight D. Kay (incumbent)	18,984	58.74
Democratic	Cullen L. Cullen	13,333	41.26
Total votes		32,317	100.0

Illinois 112th State House District General Election, 2016
Party	Candidate	Votes	%
Democratic	Katie Stuart	27,594	51.61
Republican	Dwight Kay (incumbent)	25,875	48.39
Total votes		53,469	100.0

Illinois 112th State House District Republican Primary, 2018
Party	Candidate	Votes	%
Republican	Dwight D. Kay	4,356	58.10
Republican	Wendy Erhart	3,141	41.90
Total votes		7,497	100.0

Illinois 112th State House District General Election, 2018
Party	Candidate	Votes	%
Democratic	Katie Stuart (incumbent)	24,807	55.07
Republican	Dwight Kay	20,239	44.93
Total votes		45,046	100.0

== Sources ==
- Representative Dwight Kay (R) 112th District at the Illinois General Assembly
  - By session: 98th, 97th
- Dwight Kay for State Representative
- Profile at Vote Smart
