= George M. McCormick =

American politician

George Miley McCormick (November 4, 1841 – January 13, 1913) was an American politician.

McCormick was born in Clermont County, Ohio. He served in the 2nd Ohio Infantry during the American Civil War and had suffered from a wound in his leg while in the Union Army. After the war, McCormick moved to Collinsville, Illinois in Madison County, Illinois. He served as deputy treasurer and as treasurer for Madison County. McCormick was a Republican. McCormick also served in the Illinois Senate from 1905 to 1909. McCormick died at his home in Collinsville, Ohio from complications due to his leg wound.
