= Maryville, Illinois =

- Village
- Motto: "Come Grow With Us"
- Location in Madison County, Illinois
- Coordinates: 38°43′37″N 89°59′05″W
- Country: United States
- State: Illinois
- County: Madison
- Township: Collinsville

Area
  - Total: 5.76 sq mi (14.93 km^{2})
  - Land: 5.68 sq mi (14.72 km^{2})
  - Water: 0.077 sq mi (0.20 km^{2})
- Elevation: 571 ft (174 m)

Population (2020)
  - Total: 8,221
  - Density: 1,446.1/sq mi (558.36/km^{2})
- Time zone: UTC−6 (CST)
  - Summer (DST): UTC−5 (CDT)
- ZIP code: 62062
- Area code: 618
- FIPS code: 17-47397
- GNIS feature ID: 2399269
- Website: www.vil.maryville.il.us

Maryville is a village in Madison County, Illinois, United States. The population was 8,221 at the 2020 census, up from 7,487 in 2010.

== History ==
Coal mining was historically the principal industry in Maryville. Maryville was incorporated on July 21, 1902.

== Geography ==
Maryville is located in southern Madison County 17 miles (27 km) northeast of downtown St. Louis, Missouri. It is bordered to the north by Glen Carbon, to the east by Troy, and to the south by Collinsville.

Illinois Route 159 passes through the village as Center Street, leading north 6 miles (10 km) to Edwardsville, the Madison county seat, and south 4 miles (6 km) to the center of Collinsville. Illinois Route 162 crosses the northern part of the village, leading east 4 miles (6 km) to Troy and west 6 miles (10 km) to Pontoon Beach. Interstates 55 and 70 cross the southern end of Maryville together, with access from Exit 15 (IL 159).

According to the U.S. Census Bureau, Maryville has a total area of 5.76 square miles (14.92 km^{2}), of which 5.69 square miles (14.74 km^{2}) are land and 0.075 square miles (0.19 km^{2}), or 1.30%, are water.

== Demographics ==
Historical population
Census	Pop.	Note	%±
1910	729		—
1920	836		14.7%
1930	602		−28.0%
1940	536		−11.0%
1950	539		0.6%
1960	675		25.2%
1970	1,067		58.1%
1980	1,949		82.7%
1990	2,576		32.2%
2000	4,651		80.6%
2010	7,487		61.0%
2020	8,221		9.8%
U.S. Decennial Census

=== 2020 census ===
As of the 2020 census, Maryville had a population of 8,221. The median age was 46.6 years. 17.6% of residents were under the age of 18 and 23.5% of residents were 65 years of age or older. For every 100 females there were 91.1 males, and for every 100 females age 18 and over there were 87.6 males age 18 and over.

99.8% of residents lived in urban areas, while 0.2% lived in rural areas.

There were 3,389 households in Maryville, of which 24.3% had children under the age of 18 living in them. Of all households, 56.3% were married-couple households, 13.8% were households with a male householder and no spouse or partner present, and 23.8% were households with a female householder and no spouse or partner present. About 26.1% of all households were made up of individuals and 11.7% had someone living alone who was 65 years of age or older.

There were 3,530 housing units, of which 4.0% were vacant. The homeowner vacancy rate was 0.9% and the rental vacancy rate was 8.9%.

Racial composition as of the 2020 census
Race	Number	Percent
White	6,992	85.1%
Black or African American	446	5.4%
American Indian and Alaska Native	12	0.1%
Asian	181	2.2%
Native Hawaiian and Other Pacific Islander	3	0.0%
Some other race	58	0.7%
Two or more races	529	6.4%
Hispanic or Latino (of any race)	313	3.8%

=== 2000 census ===
As of the census of 2000, there were 4,651 people, 1,743 households, and 1,267 families living in the village. The population density was 996.5 inhabitants per square mile (384.8/km^{2}). There were 1,816 housing units at an average density of 389.1 per square mile (150.2/km^{2}). The racial makeup of the village was 94.11% White, 3.46% African American, 0.11% Native American, 0.49% Asian, 0.04% Pacific Islander, 0.77% from other races, and 1.01% from two or more races. Hispanic or Latino of any race were 2.00% of the population.

There were 1,743 households, out of which 35.6% had children under the age of 18 living with them, 61.8% were married couples living together, 8.8% had a female householder with no husband present, and 27.3% were non-families. 21.9% of all households were made up of individuals, and 5.5% had someone living alone who was 65 years of age or older. The average household size was 2.53 and the average family size was 2.99.

In the village, the age distribution of the population showed 24.9% under the age of 18, 7.2% from 18 to 24, 33.3% from 25 to 44, 21.7% from 45 to 64, and 12.9% who were 65 years of age or older. The median age was 36 years. For every 100 females, there were 90.9 males. For every 100 females age 18 and over, there were 87.0 males.

The median income for a household in the village was $60,135, and the median income for a family was $62,110. Males had a median income of $43,226 versus $30,393 for females. The per capita income for the village was $27,634. About 2.6% of families and 4.1% of the population were below the poverty line, including 2.0% of those under age 18 and 4.9% of those age 65 or over.

== Events ==
On March 8, 2009, 27-year-old Terry Sedlacek shot and killed Senior Pastor Fred Winters in front of the congregation at First Baptist Church of Maryville affiliated with the Southern Baptist Convention.
