= Daniel Dove Collins House =

Historic house in Illinois, United States

- U.S. National Register of Historic Places
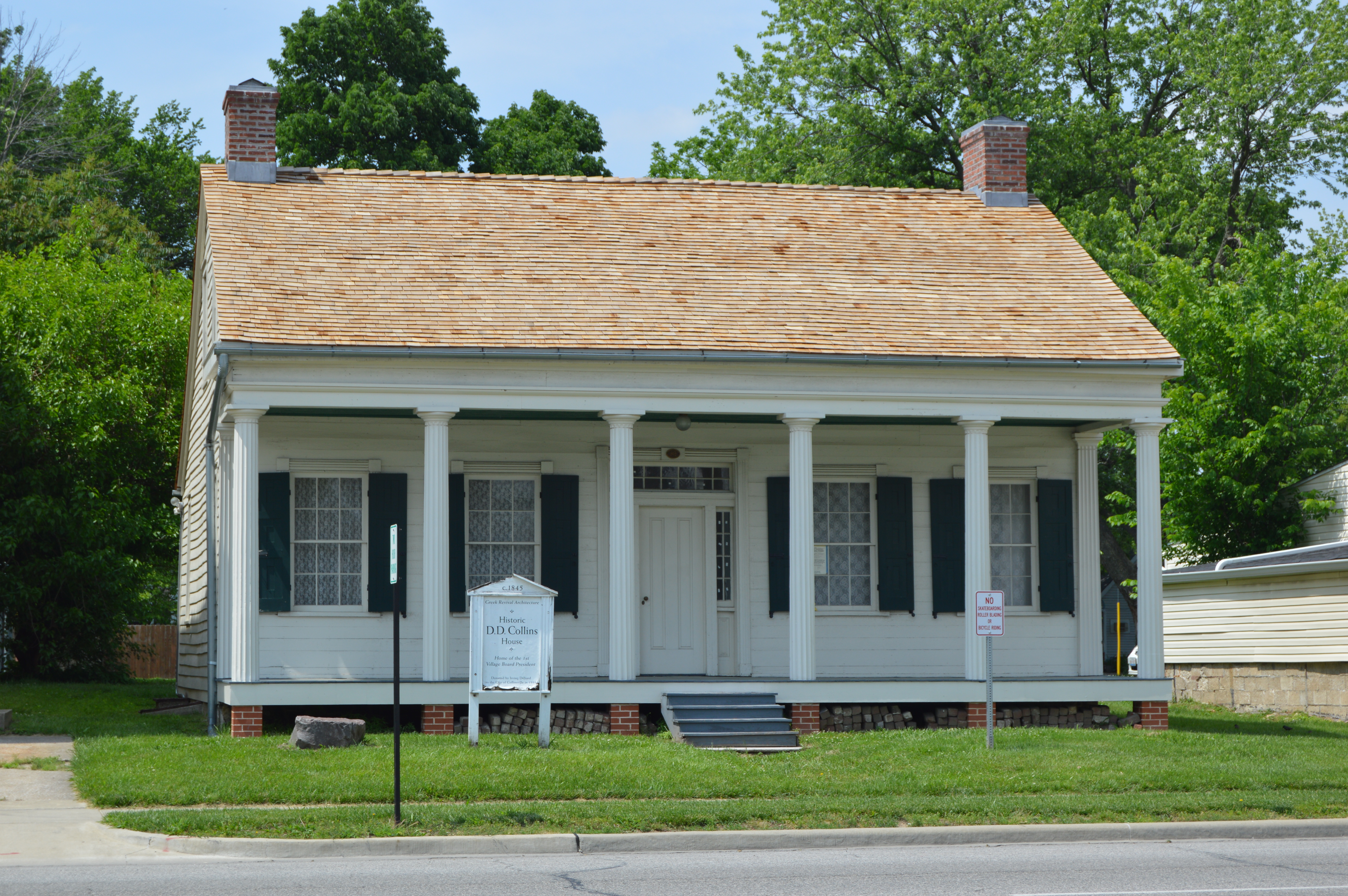
- Front with a slight bit of the western side

- Location within Illinois Location within the United States
- Location: 621 W. Main St., Collinsville, Illinois
- Coordinates: 38°40′13″N 89°59′35″W
- Area: less than one acre
- Built: 1845
- Built by: Collins, Daniel Dove
- Architectural style: Greek Revival
- NRHP reference No.: 02001385
- Added to NRHP: November 21, 2002

The Daniel Dove Collins House is a historic house located at 621 W. Main St. in Collinsville, Illinois. Daniel Dove Collins built the house in 1845 for himself and his wife. Collins, a cousin of the founders of Collinsville, was the first president of the then-village's Board of Trustees, and he held board meetings in his house. The post-and-beam house was designed in the Greek Revival style. The house has five bays delineated by the six Doric columns supporting its front porch. It is a rare surviving example of a five-bay Greek Revival home in Illinois. In the late 1880s or early 1890s, the house was moved from its original site at Main and Center Streets to its current location.

The house was added to the National Register of Historic Places on November 21, 2002.
