= Collins-Odom-Strickland House =

- U.S. National Register of Historic Places
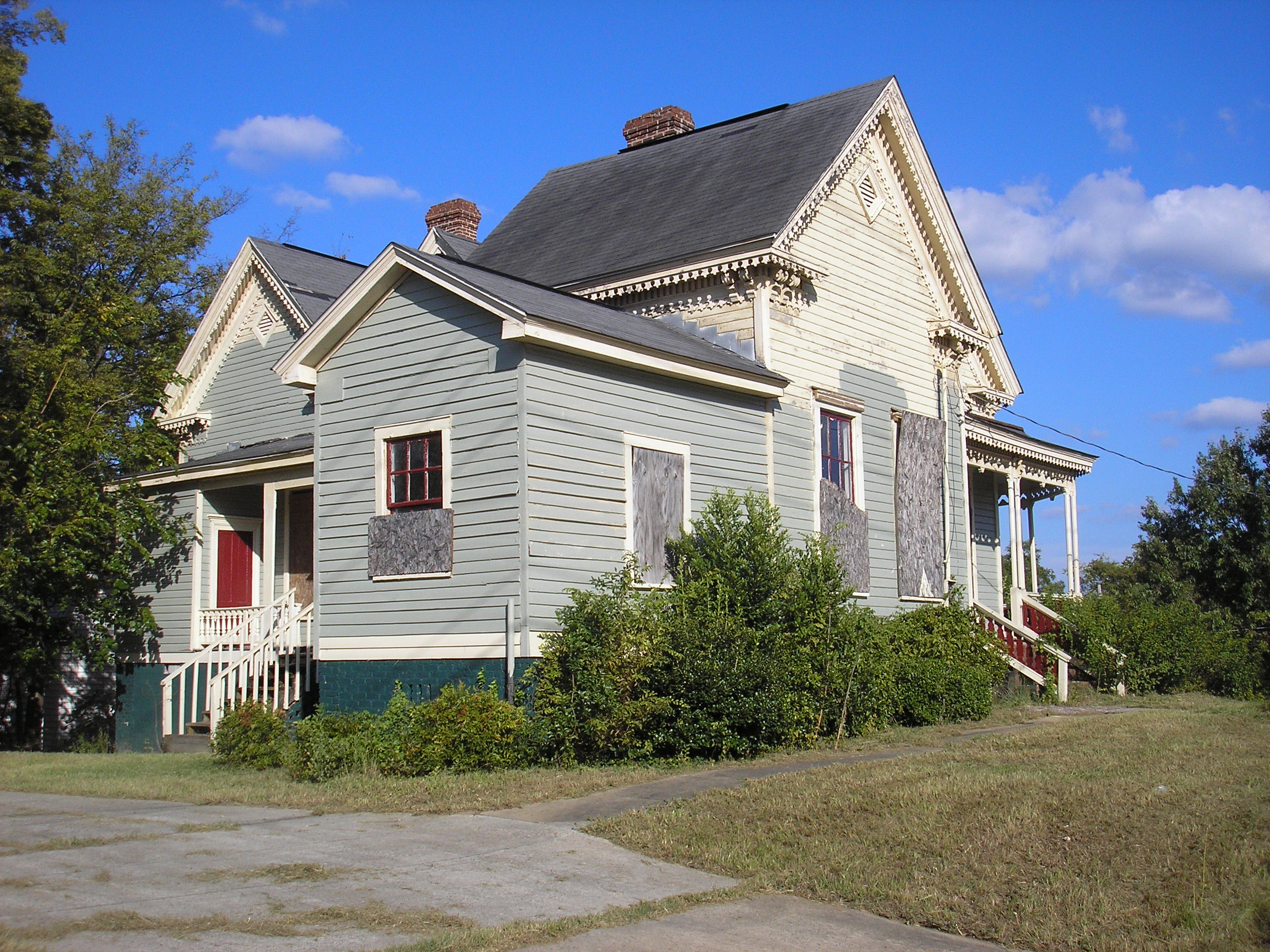
- Location: 1495 2nd Street, Macon, Georgia
- Coordinates: 32°49′25″N 83°38′23″W
- Architectural style: Victorian
- NRHP reference No.: 79000698
- Added to NRHP: January 22, 1979

Collins-Odom-Strickland House is a Victorian style house built in 1880 in Macon in Bibb County, Georgia. It was identified as one of the finest examples of Macon cottage-style architecture. It was listed on the National Register of Historic Places on January 22, 1979. It is significant for its architecture and for its history. It was built by people associated with the railroads in Macon.
