= Collinsville, Illinois =

- City
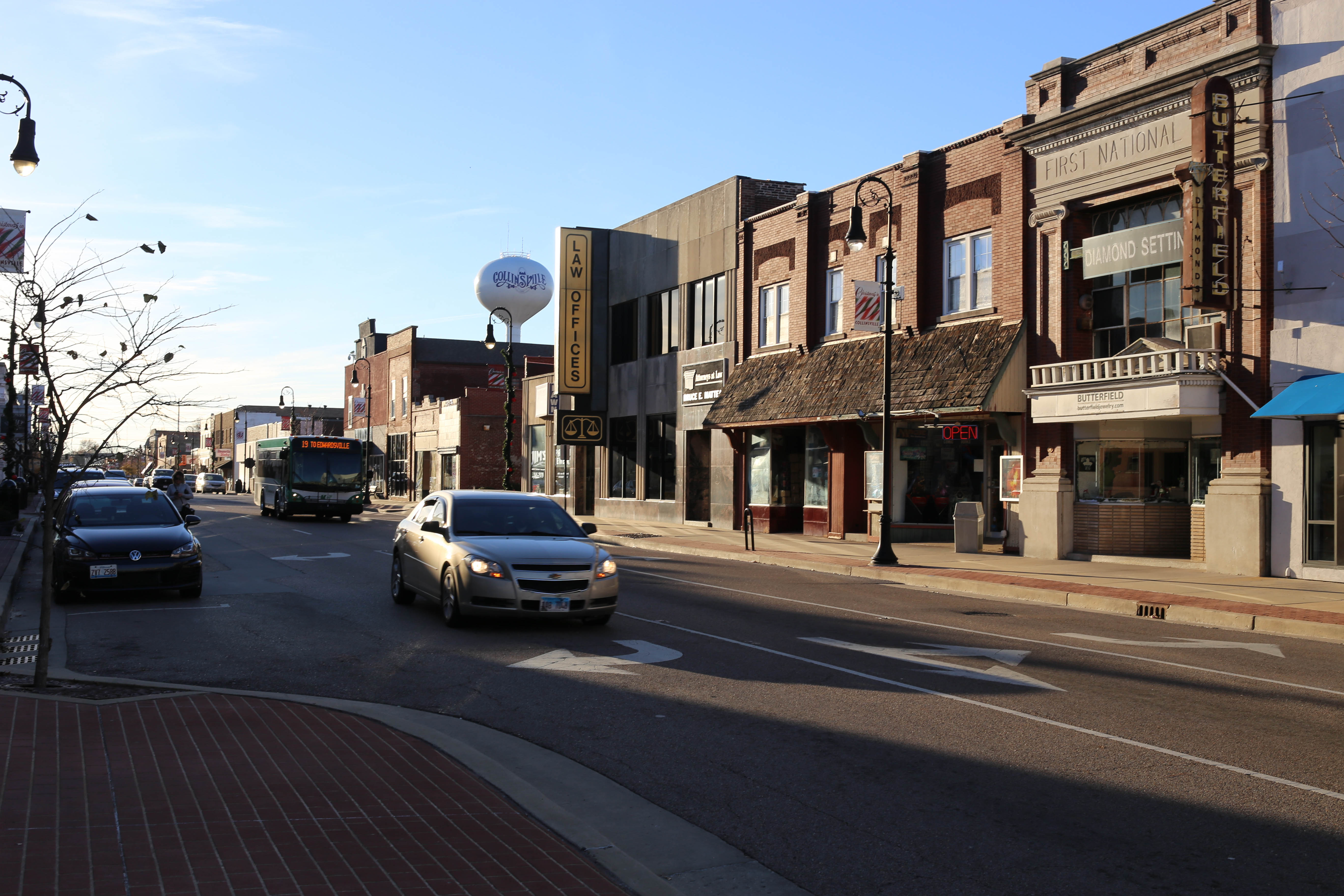
- Collinsville in 2017

- Motto: "Horseradish Capital of the World"
- Location in Madison County, Illinois
- Coordinates: 38°40′42″N 89°59′43″W
- Country: United States
- State: Illinois
- Counties: Madison, St. Clair
- Townships: Collinsville, Nameoki, Caseyville, Canteen

Government
  - Type: Council–manager government

Area
  - Total: 15.26 sq mi (39.53 km^{2})
  - Land: 15.08 sq mi (39.05 km^{2})
  - Water: 0.19 sq mi (0.48 km^{2})
- Elevation: 528 ft (161 m)

Population (2020)
  - Total: 24,366
  - Density: 1,620/sq mi (624/km^{2})
- Time zone: UTC−6 (CST)
  - Summer (DST): UTC−5 (CDT)
- ZIP code: 62234
- Area code: 618
- FIPS code: 17-15599
- GNIS feature ID: 2393598
- Website: www.collinsvilleil.org

Collinsville is a city located mainly in Madison County and partially in St. Clair County, Illinois, United States. As of the 2020 census, the city had a population of 24,366. Collinsville is approximately 14 miles (23 km) east of St. Louis, Missouri, and is part of that city's Metro East area.

Collinsville is the location of Cahokia Mounds State Historic Site, a National Historic Landmark and UNESCO World Heritage Site. This prehistoric urban complex is estimated to have had a population of thousands at its peak, long before European exploration in the area. The city is also known for the Brooks Catsup Bottle Water Tower, the world's largest ketchup bottle, and is billed as the world's horseradish capital.

== History ==
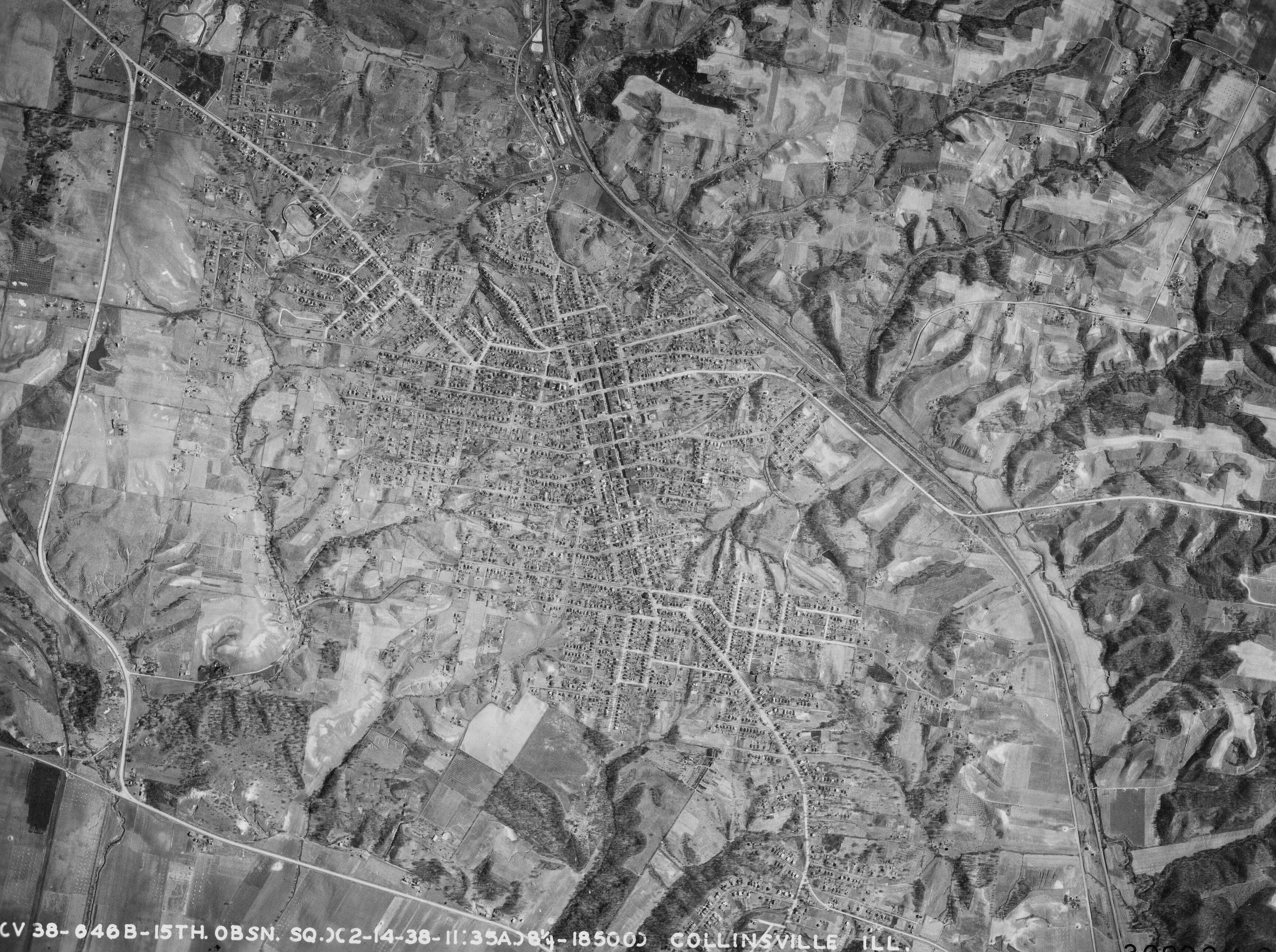
View of Collinsville, 1938

Cahokia, the largest Pre-Columbian settlement north of Mexico, was developed by the Mississippian culture and is located in what is now the westernmost part of Collinsville. At its peak about 1200 CE, Cahokia had a population of 20,000-30,000, more than any city in the present-day United States until after 1800. It includes Monks Mound, the largest prehistoric earthwork in the Americas, and more than 70 surviving smaller mounds. Monks Mound is larger at its base than the Great Pyramid of Giza.

During the French colonial era of its Illinois Country, a group of French Catholic monks had a settlement on Monks Mound, after whom it was later named. They cultivated agriculture on the terraces of the mound. They traded with bands of the historic Illini, who had migrated into the area after the peak of the Mississippian culture.

Collinsville was subsequently settled by the Cook family and by a group of German-American settlers who arrived by Conestoga wagon in 1812 from Pennsylvania. They founded Holy Cross Lutheran Church. They also had a hardware store, though they were mainly farmers. Within five or six years, a number of other settlers arrived and began to organize the legal work required to form a town on the site. These original settlers are all buried in the Cook Cemetery or the Old Lutheran Cemetery. Other early settlers are buried in the Old German Cemetery near Sugarloaf Road near Maryville.

During World War I, a Collinsville mob, composed mostly of local coal miners, lynched a German immigrant, the only such wartime murder in the country. On April 5, 1918, the mob numbering up to 300 men took Robert Prager from his home and paraded him through the streets barefoot and wrapped in an American flag, forcing him to sing patriotic songs. Collinsville police interceded and took Prager into protective custody. The mob was later mistakenly allowed to search city hall, and two men found Prager hiding in the basement. They took Prager outside and the mob marched him to the outskirts of town, along the St. Louis Road, where they lynched him. His final request was to be buried in the American flag. Eleven men stood trial for the murder, but all were acquitted on June 1, 1918.

Several historical buildings survive in Collinsville. Built in 1885, the City Hall is still used today. It was built on property originally owned by the Collins family. The building features Italianate architecture with window crowns. A short, half-block walk from City Hall is the former State Bank of Collinsville at the corner of Center and Main streets. Designed in 1916 by architect Robert G. Kirsch, this structure features a limestone exterior and marble interior walls. To the west on Main Street, the Collinsville Public Library is a colonial-style brick building with an inviting circular stone walkway; the first section was completed in 1937. Additional wings were added in 1967 and 1980.

== Geography ==
Collinsville is located mainly in southern Madison County approximately 12 miles (19 km) by air or 14 miles (23 km) by road east-northeast of downtown St Louis. Two portions of the city extend south into St. Clair County. Collinsville is bordered to the north by Maryville, to the west by Pontoon Beach and Fairmont City, and to the south by Caseyville. The 90W longitude line passes through Collinsville, west of the city center.

According to the 2021 census gazetteer files, Collinsville has a total area of 15.26 square miles (39.52 km^{2}), of which 15.08 square miles (39.06 km^{2}) (or 98.78%) is land and 0.19 square miles (0.49 km^{2}) (or 1.22%) is water. The city is drained to the northwest by Schoolhouse Branch and to the south by Canteen Creek, both of which flow west into the Mississippi River valley in the western part of the city.

== Demographics ==
Historical population
| Census | Pop. | Note | %± |
|---|---|---|---|
| 1880 | 2,887 | | — |
| 1890 | 3,498 | | 21.2% |
| 1900 | 4,021 | | 15.0% |
| 1910 | 7,478 | | 86.0% |
| 1920 | 9,753 | | 30.4% |
| 1930 | 9,235 | | −5.3% |
| 1940 | 9,767 | | 5.8% |
| 1950 | 11,862 | | 21.4% |
| 1960 | 14,217 | | 19.9% |
| 1970 | 18,224 | | 28.2% |
| 1980 | 19,475 | | 6.9% |
| 1990 | 22,446 | | 15.3% |
| 2000 | 24,707 | | 10.1% |
| 2010 | 25,579 | | 3.5% |
| 2020 | 24,366 | | −4.7% |
U.S. Decennial Census

=== Racial and ethnic composition ===
Collinsville city, Illinois – Racial and ethnic composition Note: the US Census treats Hispanic/Latino as an ethnic category. This table excludes Latinos from the racial categories and assigns them to a separate category. Hispanics/Latinos may be of any race.
| Race / Ethnicity (NH = Non-Hispanic) | Pop 2000 | Pop 2010 | Pop 2020 | % 2000 | % 2010 | % 2020 |
|---|---|---|---|---|---|---|
| White alone (NH) | 22,274 | 21,186 | 17,727 | 90.15% | 82.83% | 72.75% |
| Black or African American alone (NH) | 1,429 | 2,544 | 3,548 | 5.78% | 9.95% | 14.56% |
| Native American or Alaska Native alone (NH) | 57 | 44 | 43 | 0.23% | 0.17% | 0.18% |
| Asian alone (NH) | 142 | 196 | 199 | 0.57% | 0.77% | 0.82% |
| Native Hawaiian or Pacific Islander alone (NH) | 5 | 12 | 7 | 0.02% | 0.05% | 0.03% |
| Other race alone (NH) | 15 | 16 | 91 | 0.06% | 0.06% | 0.37% |
| Mixed race or Multiracial (NH) | 251 | 469 | 1,288 | 1.02% | 1.83% | 5.29% |
| Hispanic or Latino (any race) | 534 | 1,112 | 1,463 | 2.16% | 4.35% | 6.00% |
| Total | 24,707 | 25,579 | 24,366 | 100.00% | 100.00% | 100.00% |

=== 2020 census ===
As of the 2020 census there were 24,366 people, 10,479 households, and 6,628 families residing in the city. The population density was 1,596.31 inhabitants per square mile (616.34/km^{2}). There were 11,577 housing units at an average density of 758.45 per square mile (292.84/km^{2}). Of these housing units, 7.6% were vacant. The homeowner vacancy rate was 2.2% and the rental vacancy rate was 7.6%. The racial makeup of the city was 74.08% White, 14.67% African American, 0.33% Native American, 0.83% Asian, 0.03% Pacific Islander, 2.56% from other races, and 7.50% from two or more races. Hispanic or Latino of any race were 6.00% of the population.

There were 10,479 households, out of which 29.1% had children under the age of 18 living with them, 44.34% were married couples living together, 14.49% had a female householder with no husband present, and 36.75% were non-families. 30.26% of all households were made up of individuals, and 10.80% had someone living alone who was 65 years of age or older. The average household size was 2.92 and the average family size was 2.33.

The city's age distribution consisted of 22.1% under the age of 18, 7.3% from 18 to 24, 29.9% from 25 to 44, 26.1% from 45 to 64, and 14.7% who were 65 years of age or older. The median age was 38.5 years. For every 100 females, there were 86.8 males. For every 100 females age 18 and over, there were 84.3 males.

The median income for a household in the city was $56,250, and the median income for a family was $69,323. Males had a median income of $46,165 versus $28,712 for females. The per capita income for the city was $31,912. About 11.1% of families and 13.2% of the population were below the poverty line, including 21.0% of those under age 18 and 5.7% of those age 65 or over.

Racial composition as of the 2020 census
| Race | Number | Percent |
|---|---|---|
| White | 18,051 | 74.1% |
| Black or African American | 3,574 | 14.7% |
| American Indian and Alaska Native | 80 | 0.3% |
| Asian | 202 | 0.8% |
| Native Hawaiian and Other Pacific Islander | 8 | 0.0% |
| Some other race | 623 | 2.6% |
| Two or more races | 1,828 | 7.5% |

== Transportation ==
=== Roads ===
Interstates 55 and 70 run concurrently through the north side of Collinsville, with access from Exits 9 through 15, while Interstate 255 passes through the west side of the city, with access from Exits 24 and 26. Illinois Route 159 passes through the center of Collinsville as Morrison Avenue and Vandalia Street, leading north 10 miles (16 km) to Edwardsville and south 5 miles (8 km) to Fairview Heights, while Route 157 (Bluff Road) crosses the west side of the city, leading north 5 miles (8 km) to Glen Carbon and south 3 miles (5 km) to Caseyville. U.S. Route 66 in Illinois originally passed through Collinsville.

== Culture ==
Collinsville is the self-proclaimed "Horseradish Capital of the World", and sponsors an annual Horseradish Festival. The area is said to produce 85% of the world's horseradish, of such high quality that Germany and China (key users of the herb) import it for gourmet use. The Horseradish Festival is held annually during the first weekend in June and is held uptown Collinsville on Main Street. It has activities for all ages, including a 5K run, live music, a beauty pageant, and root-grinding demonstrations.

Known for its large ethnic Italian population, descendants of late 19th and early 20th-century immigrants, Collinsville hosts an annual Italian Fest in the fall. The Italian Fest has been held annually since 1983 and is located in uptown Collinsville on Main Street. This two-day festival features live music and vendors selling authentic Italian food such as spedini, spumoni, bagna cauda, cannoli, and Italian Ices. Other activities include a parade, midnight bike ride, 5K Run/Walk, Little Miss & Mister Pageant, Bocce Ball Tournament, and a grape stomp.

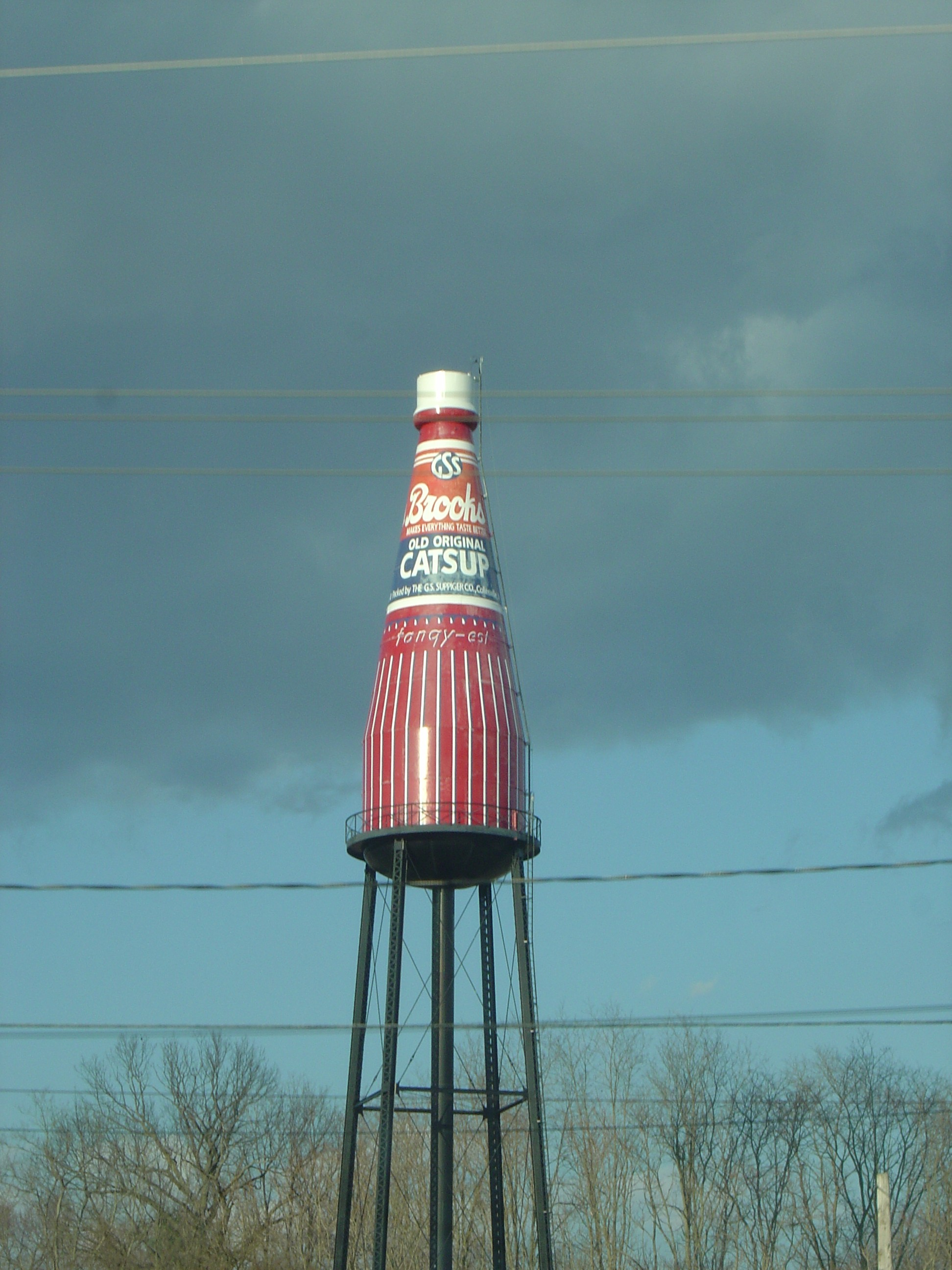
The Brooks Catsup Bottle Water Tower, a water tower in Collinsville

Collinsville is the site of the Brooks Catsup Bottle Water Tower, "the world's largest catsup bottle", a 170-foot-tall (52 m) water tower in the shape of a ketchup bottle, which is listed on the National Register of Historic Places. The bottle along with the property was put up for sale for $500,000.00 on July 12, 2014. In order to celebrate this roadside landmark, Collinsville hosts an annual World's Largest Catsup Bottle Festival in July.

The Fairmount Park Racetrack for horse racing is located in Collinsville. The racetrack is owned by the corporation Ogden-Fairmount Incorporated. This is one of five race tracks in Illinois, and the only one located outside Chicago. Fairmont Park Racetrack features a one-mile oval dirt track and opened in 1925. The racetrack originally hosted both Thoroughbred flat racing and Standardbred harness racing. The racetrack has hosted popular races, including the Fairmont Derby in the 1920s and the St. Louis Derby in 2006, along with other weekly live races. Three restaurants are located at the track for visitors to enjoy: the Top of the Turf, the Black Stallion Room, and the 1st Turn Café. Admission for live racing is $1.50 per person on Tuesdays and $2.50 per person on Fridays and Saturdays.

The Cahokia Mounds State Historic Site is located within the city limits of Collinsville. This large park has been designated as a National Historic Landmark and was one of the first eight UNESCO World Heritage Sites designated within the United States; today there are a total of 23. A museum and visitors' center provide a movie and displays which present the lives of the ancient inhabitants.

== Notable people ==
- Michelle Bartsch-Hackley, Team USA Olympic volleyball player and professional volleyball player
- Irving Dilliard, journalist and author; life-long resident of Collinsville.
- Art Fletcher, shortstop with two teams
- Moses Harrison, Illinois jurist; born in Collinsville
- Tanner Houck, pitcher for the Boston Red Sox; grew up in Collinsville
- Tom Jager, Olympic gold medalist in swimming; went to Collinsville High School
- Jerry Kane, first baseman and catcher for the St. Louis Browns; born in Collinsville
- Tony Malinosky, player with the Brooklyn Dodgers; born in Collinsville
- George M. McCormick, Illinois state senator; lived in Collinsville
- James O. Monroe, Illinois state legislator; lived in Collinsville
- Terry Moore, center fielder for the St. Louis Cardinals
- George Musso, Football Hall of Fame lineman for the Chicago Bears
- Ken Oberkfell, former infielder St. Louis Cardinals 1982 World Series Champ
- Alexandra Picatto, former child actress; born in Collinsville
- Robert Prager, German immigrant who was lynched in Collinsville during World War I
- Joe Reiniger, forward for the St. Louis Illusion (Indoor Soccer League)
- John Shimkus, US congressman; born in Collinsville
- Kevin Stallings, former college basketball coach; born in Collinsville
- Michael Stipe, lead singer of R.E.M.; graduated from high school in Collinsville
- Daniel A. Vallero, professor of engineering at Duke University; grew up in Collinsville
