= Jarvis-Fleet House =

Historic house in New York, United States

- U.S. National Register of Historic Places
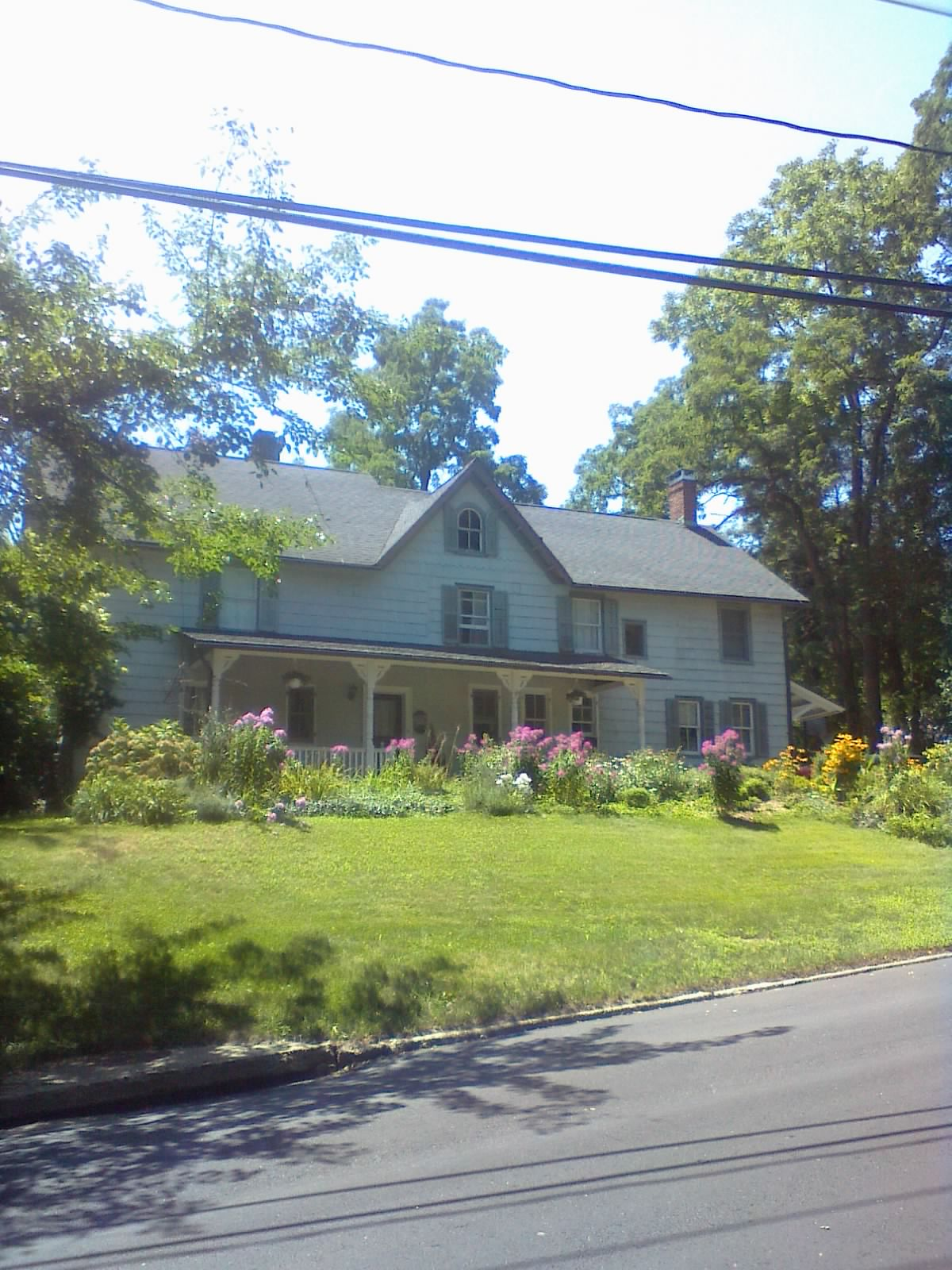

- Location within New York Location within the United States
- Location: 138 Cove Rd., Huntington, New York
- Coordinates: 40°53′58″N 73°23′31″W
- Area: 0.5 acres (0.20 ha)
- Built: ca. 1700
- Architect: Fleet family
- Architectural style: Late Victorian, Eclectic
- MPS: Huntington Town MRA
- NRHP reference No.: 85002538
- Added to NRHP: September 26, 1985

Captain Thomas Fleet came from England with his family circa 1660 in his own vessel and settled near the town of Huntington, New York (est. 1653). He went into the trading business between New York and the West Indies and, prospering, was assessed for forty vessels, in addition to land and livestock fifteen years later. In the ensuing years Captain Fleet became a significant landholder in the Huntington area, building and settling in the residence at 138 Cove Road, Huntington. The parcel on which the Fleet residence sits at one time stretched from the body of water now known as "Fleets Cove" to Route 25A. Fleet chose the harbor due to its size, depth and protection from the larger body of water which connects to the Long Island Sound and then the Atlantic Ocean.

Captain Fleet may have established an initial homestead where the current Fleet residence sits as early as his arrival circa 1660.

The Fleet home is a two and one-half story, seven-bay shingled dwelling. The steeply pitched gable roof has overhanging eaves with exposed rafter ends and a central shingled cross-gable with round arched window which was likely added sometime in the late nineteenth century. A historical photo of the home discovered (see link below) shows the home prior to the addition of the north porch, central gable with arched window, and extension of the second floor. The home, as can be seen in the photo, did not originally have a second floor which spanned fully from east to west, as it does today. Architectural details suggest that the extension to the second floor was likely added sometime in the mid to late 19th century, along with the home's central gable and arched window.

Built circa 1700 and meticulously cared for since that time, the Jarvis-Fleet residence is a distinctive historic resource for the Huntington/Centerport area as it is one of the few remaining structures in the community associated with the area's earliest European settlement.

The home, according to records and prior to the establishment of Cove Road, originally faced south. The eastern portion of this fairly large home was the original two-story half-house. As can be seen in the photo below, the ground floor extended further to the west, including the kitchen and living space. The later second floor addition to the west side necessitated the removal of the original chimney (the footing remains at the cellar level to this day). At the same time, the present central main staircase was installed, a primary entrance on the north side was added, and the secondary north entrance was closed. Ultimately, a front porch with eclectic Victorian details, and the gable and arched window above, were added sometime in the 20th century. The chamfered girts on the framing of the interior northeast rooms are still visible and date back to the original 1700's home. The original kitchen fireplace from circa 1700 is still visible in the northwest interior, and much of what may have been the original early 1700's framing was utilized in more recent renovations.

Descendants of Thomas Fleet resided in the home until as recently as 1944, at which time a transfer deed shows the sale of the home from Elbert A. Fleet, Mary F. Cochran (formerly Mary L. Fleet), Jane F. Price (formerly Jane F. Fleet), Jesse D. Fleet, Alice Blackledge Fleet, and Cornelia Fleet Eldredge (formerly Cornelia R. Fleet) to George F. Furze and Florence F. Furze (formerly Florence, F. Fleet) in 1944.

The home was extensively restored and renovated between 2015-2016, including the addition of a sun room on the south side, a rear porch, and closure of the cellar entrance at the south side.

It was added to the National Register of Historic Places in 1985.

Photos: https://commons.wikimedia.org/wiki/File:Thomas_Fleet_Residence_-_Date_Unknown.jpg
