= Frederick Collins House =

Historic house in Massachusetts, United States

- U.S. National Register of Historic Places
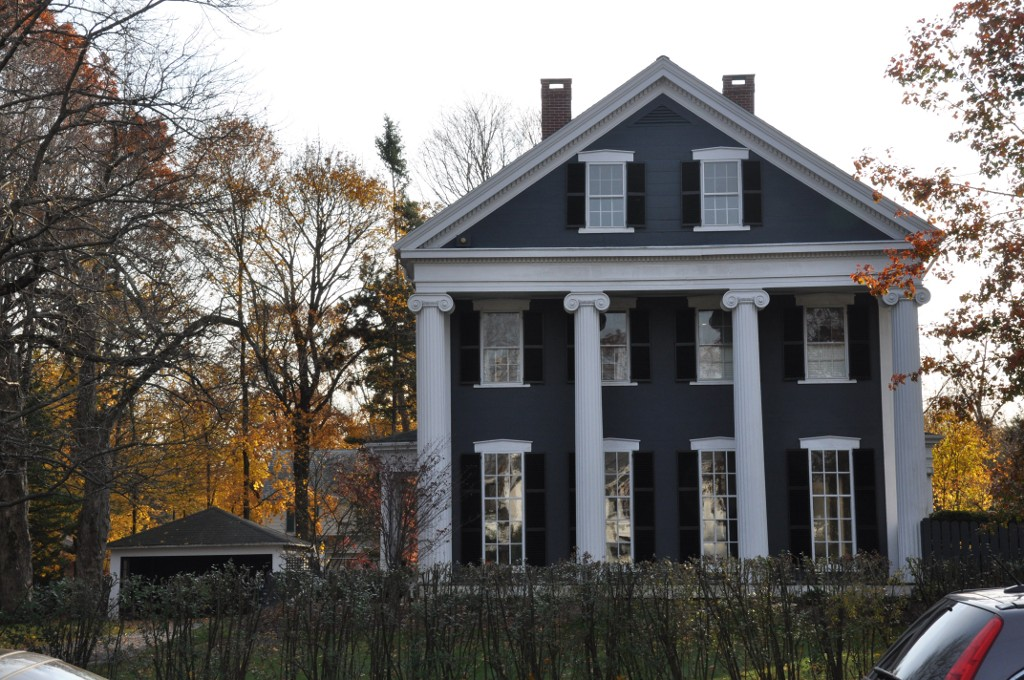

- Location within Massachusetts
- Location: 1734 Beacon St., Newton, Massachusetts
- Coordinates: 42°19′35.33″N 71°14′04.99″W
- Built: 1847
- Architect: Collins, Frederick A.
- Architectural style: Greek Revival
- MPS: Newton MRA
- NRHP reference No.: 86001786
- Added to NRHP: September 04, 1986

The Frederick Collins House is a historic house at 1734 Beacon Street in Newton, Massachusetts. The 2 1/2-story wood-frame house was built in 1847, and is the only temple-front Greek Revival house in the village of Waban. It as two-story Ionic columns supporting an entablature and triangular pediment. The tympanum is flushboarded, an attempt to give it the appearance of ashlar stone. Side entrance are also set under Ionic porches, and the building has corner pilasters.

The house was listed on the National Register of Historic Places in 1986.

== See also ==
- National Register of Historic Places listings in Newton, Massachusetts
