= Col. Charles and Mary Ann Jarvis Homestead =

Historic house in Maine, United States

- U.S. National Register of Historic Places
- Location within Maine Location within the United States
- Location: 10 Surry Rd., Ellsworth, Maine
- Coordinates: 44°32′18″N 68°25′46″W
- Area: less than one acre
- Built: 1828
- Built by: David Dyer
- Architectural style: Federal, Colonial Revival
- NRHP reference No.: 03001403
- Added to NRHP: January 15, 2004

The Col. Charles and Mary Ann Jarvis Homestead is a historic house at 10 Surry Road in Ellsworth, Maine. Built in 1828, the house is architecturally significant as a fine example of transitional Federal-Greek Revival styling, based in part on the publications of Asher Benjamin. It is historically notable for its association with Charles Jarvis, a major landowner in the region. Jarvis was also an active participant in the military preparations of the bloodless Aroostook War, resulting from a long-running boundary dispute with neighboring New Brunswick. Jarvis' daughter, Ann Francis Greely, was also Hancock County's first female doctor, and a local activist for women's rights and temperance. The house was listed on the National Register of Historic Places in 2004.

== Description ==
The Jarvis House is set on the southeast side of Surry Road (Maine State Route 172), a short way south of its junction with United States Route 1, just west of Ellsworth's central business district. Its main block is a roughly square wood-frame structure, with a hip roof that is topped by a flat balustraded area at its center. A single-story hip-roof porch extends around three sides of this block, and a two-story gable-roof ell extends to the east side of the main block, with a further single-story addition at its end. The porch is supported by Tuscan columns, and has a modillioned cornice.

The interior of the house follows a central hall plan. Its major public space is to the left of the hall, and consists of a large double parlor with sliding doors at its center. Design of this room is clearly drawn from Plate LIV of Asher Benjamin's American Builder's Companion. The dining room, to the right of the hall, is more richly detailed in its woodwork. The kitchen, located behind the dining room, has had a number of later alterations, including a butler's pantry and a German silver sink.

== History ==
The house was built in 1828 by a builder from Castine. A number of its exterior features, including the wraparound porch, are Colonial Revival alterations made around the turn of the 20th century. The balustrade that is now atop the roof is not original. A carriage house, built c. 1914, replaced an older New England barn on the property.

Charles Jarvis (1788-1865) came to Maine around 1818 to manage extensive lands that his father had acquired, and was elected to the state legislature. Jarvis was in competition with John Black (whose nearby mansion is now a museum property), the land agent for William Bingham, the area's largest landowner. Jarvis married Black's daughter Ann (over initial objections from her father) in 1820. Competition between the two men extended to disputes over the municipal boundaries of Ellsworth and Surry; Jarvis' house was located in Surry when it was built.

When border tensions with neighboring New Brunswick flared in the 1830s, Jarvis is reported to have built the military road connecting Mattawamkeag and Houlton, the latter being a major staging point for the state militia that was organized because of the dispute. In 1839 Jarvis, commissioned a colonel in the state militia, led troops up to the mouth of the Aroostook River. The border dispute was resolved peacefully with the 1842 Webster-Ashburton Treaty.

Jarvis' daughter Ann was born here in 1831, and became one Hancock County's first and most successful businesswomen. At twenty she purchased a local dry goods store, and in 1895 she was specially authorized by the state legislature to practice medicine. She was also well known as a supporter of temperance, and of women's right to vote. It was during her ownership of the house that the butler's pantry, silver sink, dumbwaiter, and electric call buttons were installed in the house.

A later owner of the house was Hannibal Emery Hamlin, the son of United States Vice President Hannibal Hamlin. He served as Maine Attorney General 1905–1908, and also in the state legislature.

== See also ==
- National Register of Historic Places listings in Hancock County, Maine
