= Timothy Edwards Collins Mansion =

Historic house in Montana, United States

- Collins, Timothy Edward, Mansion
- U.S. National Register of Historic Places
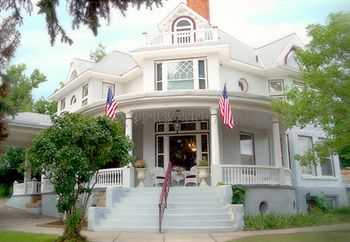

- Location within Montana Location within the United States
- Interactive map showing the location of Collins Mansion
- Location: 1003–1017 2nd Ave., NW, Great Falls, Montana
- Coordinates: 47°30′36″N 111°19′43″W
- Area: 1.3 acres (0.53 ha)
- Built: 1891
- Architectural style: Eclectic
- NRHP reference No.: 80002402
- Added to NRHP: August 27, 1980

The Collins Mansion is a historic home in Great Falls, Montana, United States. The mansion was built in 1891 by Irish born Timothy Edward Collins, a local businessman who initially traveled to Montana during the gold rush. This, his second Great Falls residence was one of the town's first homes built on the west side of the Missouri River. The brick home, now covered in a stucco facade from the 1960s, is classified as Edwardian and Norman Shaw Queen Anne styles and was Great Falls' first home to be listed on the National Register of Historic Places. Despite the now hidden brick facade, much of the original, exterior, Victorian details remain today untouched: classical modillions on the third floor dormer, egg-and-dart-crowned porch columns, dentillation beneath the cornice, and fluted pilasters flanking the mullions in the front windows. The mansion's interior contains quarter sawn oak, maple, cherry, birch, and eastern pine woodwork throughout. It previously served as an event hall and is currently an event hall.
