= Edwardsville Township, Madison County, Illinois =

Edwardsville Township
- Township
- Flag Seal

- Location of Illinois in the United States
- Coordinates: 38°47′13″N 89°58′48″W
- Country: United States
- State: Illinois
- County: Madison
- Settled: November 2, 1875

Government
  - Supervisor: Kevin Hall

Area
  - Total: 35.99 sq mi (93.2 km^{2})
  - Land: 35.25 sq mi (91.3 km^{2})
  - Water: 0.74 sq mi (1.9 km^{2})
- Elevation: 581 ft (177 m)

Population (2010)
  - Estimate (2016): 38,325
  - Density: 1,068.2/sq mi (412.4/km^{2})
- Time zone: UTC-6 (CST)
  - Summer (DST): UTC-5 (CDT)
- FIPS code: 17-119-22710
- Website: edwardsvilletownship.com

Edwardsville Township is located in Madison County, Illinois, in the United States. As of the 2010 census, its population was 37,657 and it contained 15,482 housing units.

It includes the city of Edwardsville.

== Geography ==
According to the 2010 census, the township has a total area of 35.99 square miles (93.2 km^{2}), of which 35.25 square miles (91.3 km^{2}) (or 97.94%) is land and 0.74 square miles (1.9 km^{2}) (or 2.06%) is water.

== Demographics ==
Historical population
Census	Pop.	Note	%±
2016 (est.)	38,325
U.S. Decennial Census
