= William W. Jarvis House =

Historic house in Illinois, United States

- U.S. National Register of Historic Places
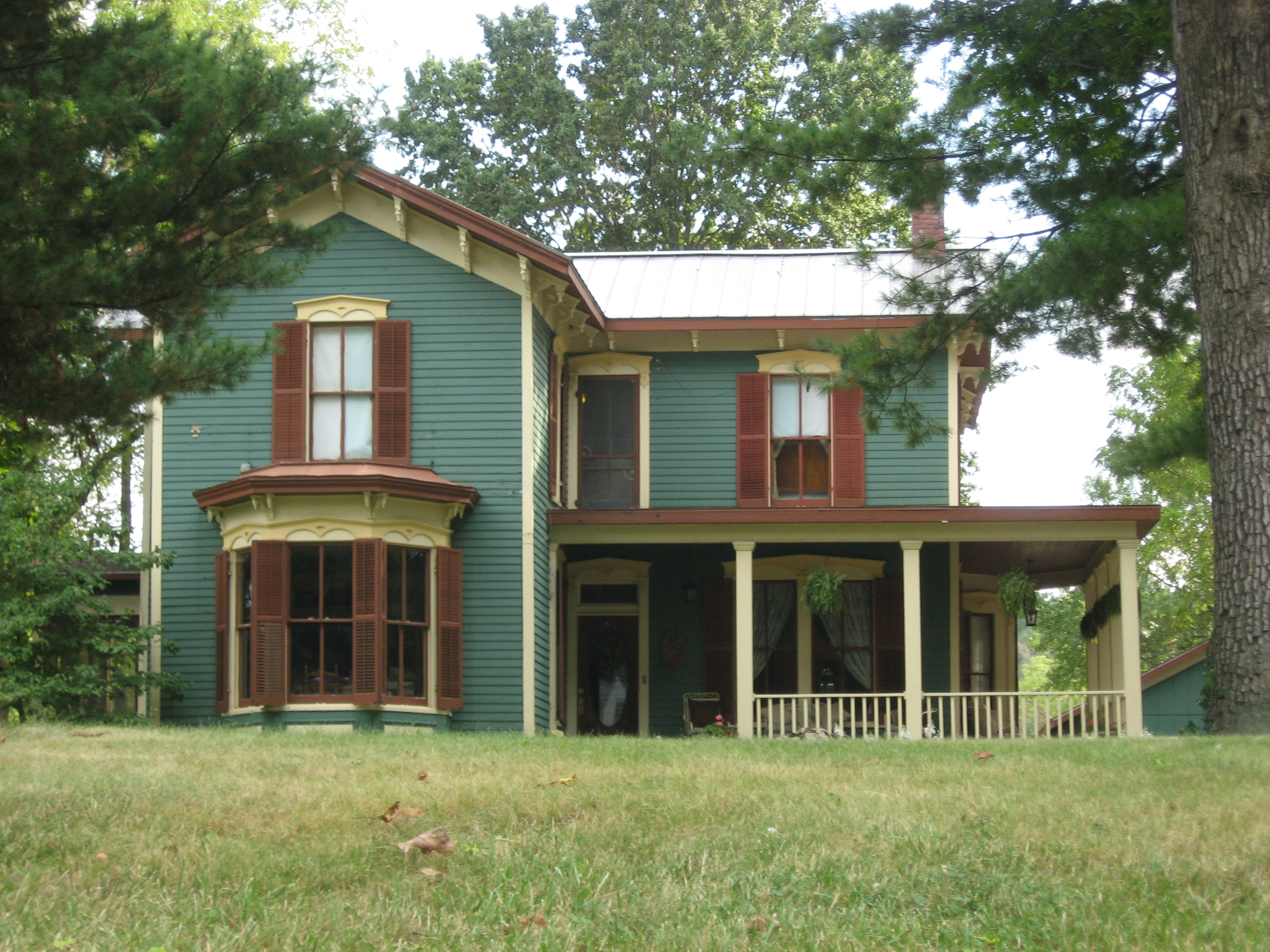

- Location within Illinois Location within the United States
- Interactive map showing the location for Jarvis House
- Location: 317 E. Center St., Troy, Illinois
- Coordinates: 38°43′37″N 89°52′36″W
- Area: 1.75 acres (0.71 ha)
- Built: 1867
- Architectural style: Italianate
- NRHP reference No.: 87002514
- Added to NRHP: February 3, 1988

The William W. Jarvis House is a historic house located at 317 East Center Street in Troy, Illinois. The house was built in 1867 and has been listed on the National Register of Historic Places since 1988.

== William W. Jarvis ==
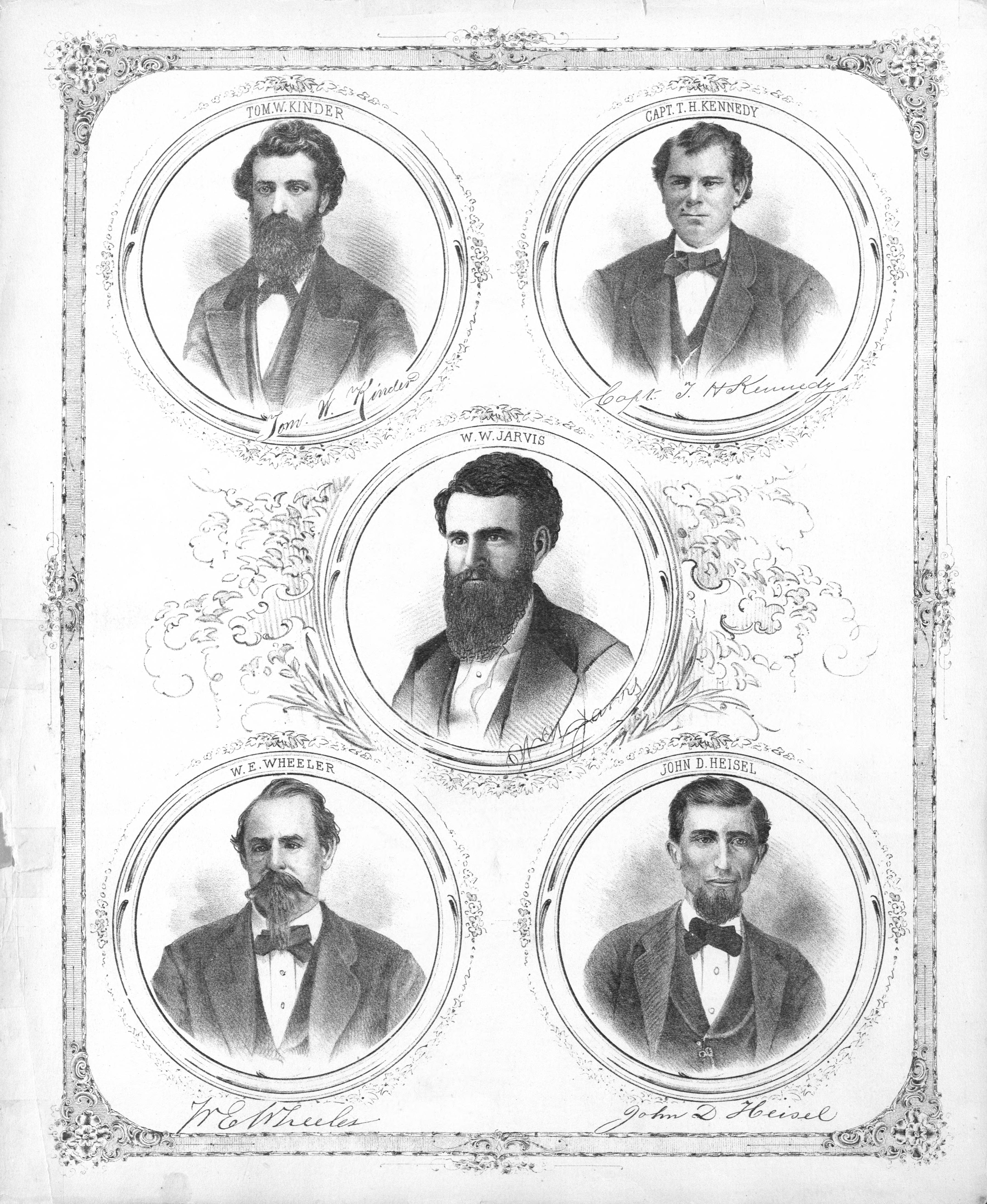
William W. Jarvis is depicted in the center of this drawing from the Illustrated Encyclopedia & Atlas Map of Madison County, Ill. (1873), p. 104a.

William W. Jarvis was a Madison County, Illinois native, born on 11 March 1842, the fourth child of Wesley Jarvis, a farmer. His grandfather, John Jarvis, was an early Troy Settler and was one of the first practical abolitionists in Madison County. On 10 Sept 1814, John Jarvis and Titus Gregg made the first entries of land that would become the current city of Troy. The township in which the city is located still bears his name. William built the house in 1867, in anticipation of his marriage to Ms. Sarah Barnsback on 23 Dec of that year. The property, on which the home sits in its original location, was a 13-acre land grant given by President Monroe, approximately two acres of which remain.

By all accounts, Jarvis received a good business education in the schools of Troy. In 1861, as the Civil War broke out, he was an early volunteer for the Union Army, Company One, Ninth Illinois Infantry. After serving an initial three-month enlistment, he re-enlisted for three years and mustered out as a Sergeant in 1864. He served in nearly all of the Ninth’s 110 engagements with distinction, was wounded twice, and was taken captive by the enemy twice. After the war, he took up farming and studied law.

=== Business Pursuits ===
He soon abandoned his study of law in favor of matrimony and mercantile pursuits. In partnership with J. A. Barnsback, he opened the first lumberyard in Troy. He purchased his partner's interest in 1869 and conducted the business successfully as sole owner until 1876, when he entered the livestock commission trade at the National Stockyards at St. Clair, Co., Ill. In 1885, with H.H. Padon as his partner, he opened the Troy Exchange Bank and became sole proprietor in 1887. While political office did not appeal to him, he still served his fellow citizens as one of the first commissioners of Madison County, from 1874 to 1876, before inauguration of the township system.

=== Friendship With General William Tecumseh Sherman ===
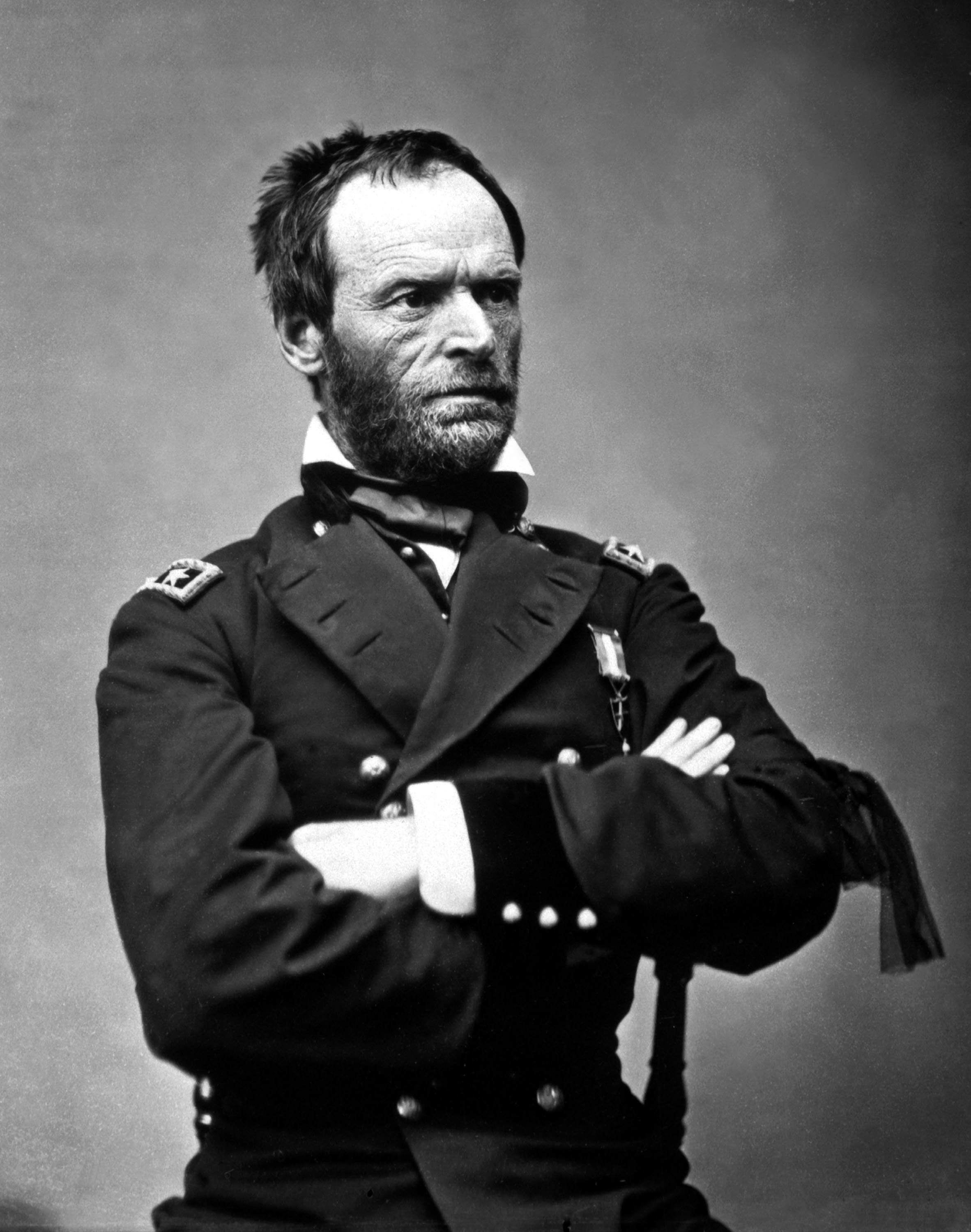
Portrait of Gen. William T. Sherman in 1865

Jarvis had met General William Tecumseh Sherman during the Civil War and the two became friends, corresponding often by mail. Numerous letters, newspaper accounts, and stories from his descendants document his management of Gen. Sherman's business affairs in the Troy area, and their friendship. Gen. Sherman was a guest at the Jarvis home when he visited the area, and Mr. Jarvis named one of his sons (Willie Sherman Jarvis, who died in childhood) after the General.

== The Jarvis House ==
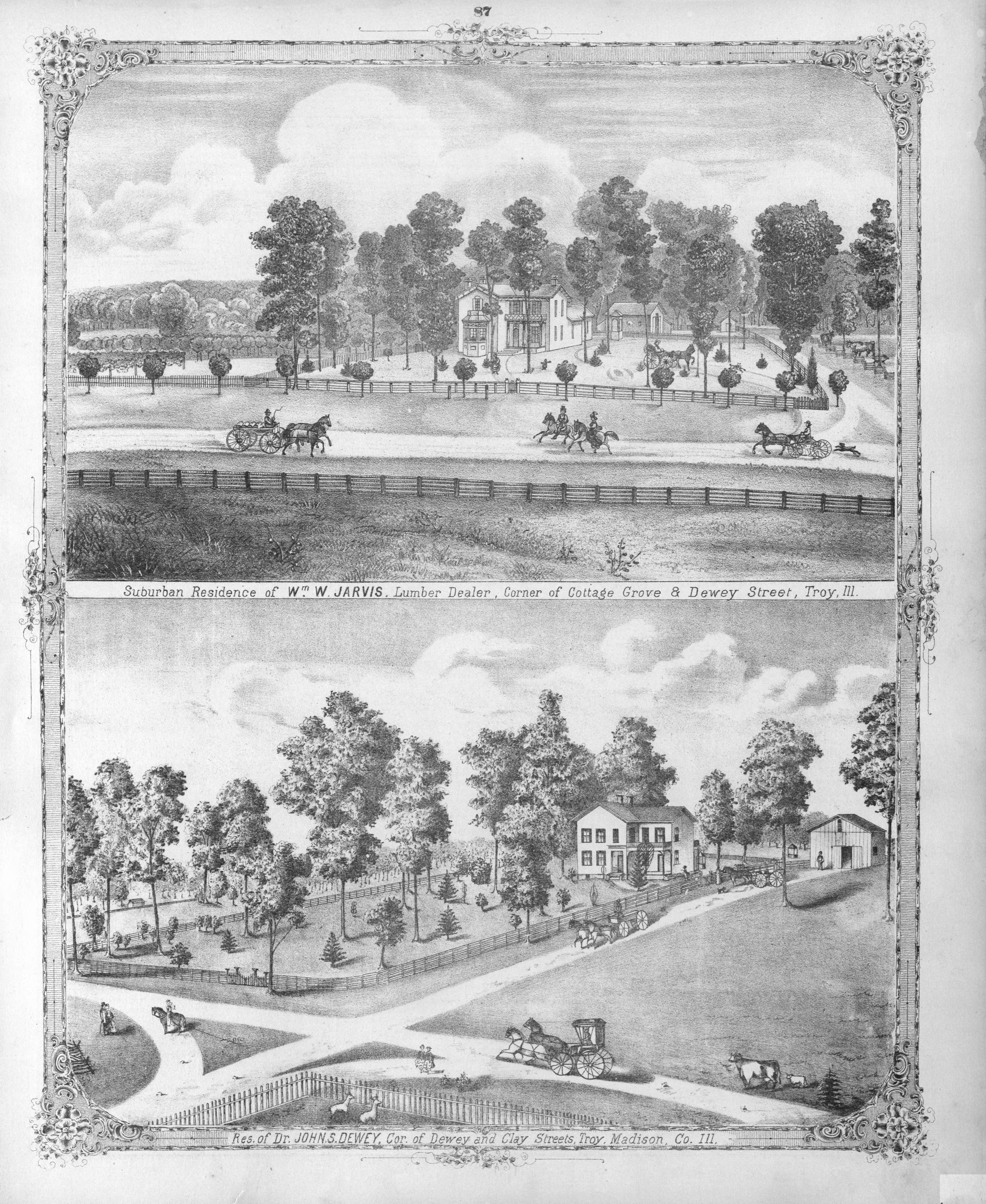
The William W. Jarvis house is depicted in the top half of this illustration from the Illustrated Encyclopedia & Atlas Map of Madison County, Ill. (1873), p. 87. The driveway of the current residence still follows the original buggy path. Of note, the residence of Dr. John S. Dewey is depicted in the lower half--the house is no longer extant, but the vacant lot abuts the property of the current Silver Creek elementary school.

Mr. Jarvis designed his home in the picturesque Italianate style, which dominated American houses constructed between 1850 and 1880, particularly in the towns and cities of the Midwest. The house is significant and distinctive by its outstanding state of preservation and architectural integrity, and by its being the only remaining example in the local community of the asymmetrical, compound-plan subtype. The two-story house has a projecting mass on one side of the front facade and a porch on the other. A polygonal window bay protrudes from the first floor of the projecting mass. All of the house's windows are sash windows, constructed of sugar pine, and topped by pediment hoods. The house's cross gabled roof features overhanging eaves and a cornice decorated with large, ornately scrolled eave brackets with turned finials.

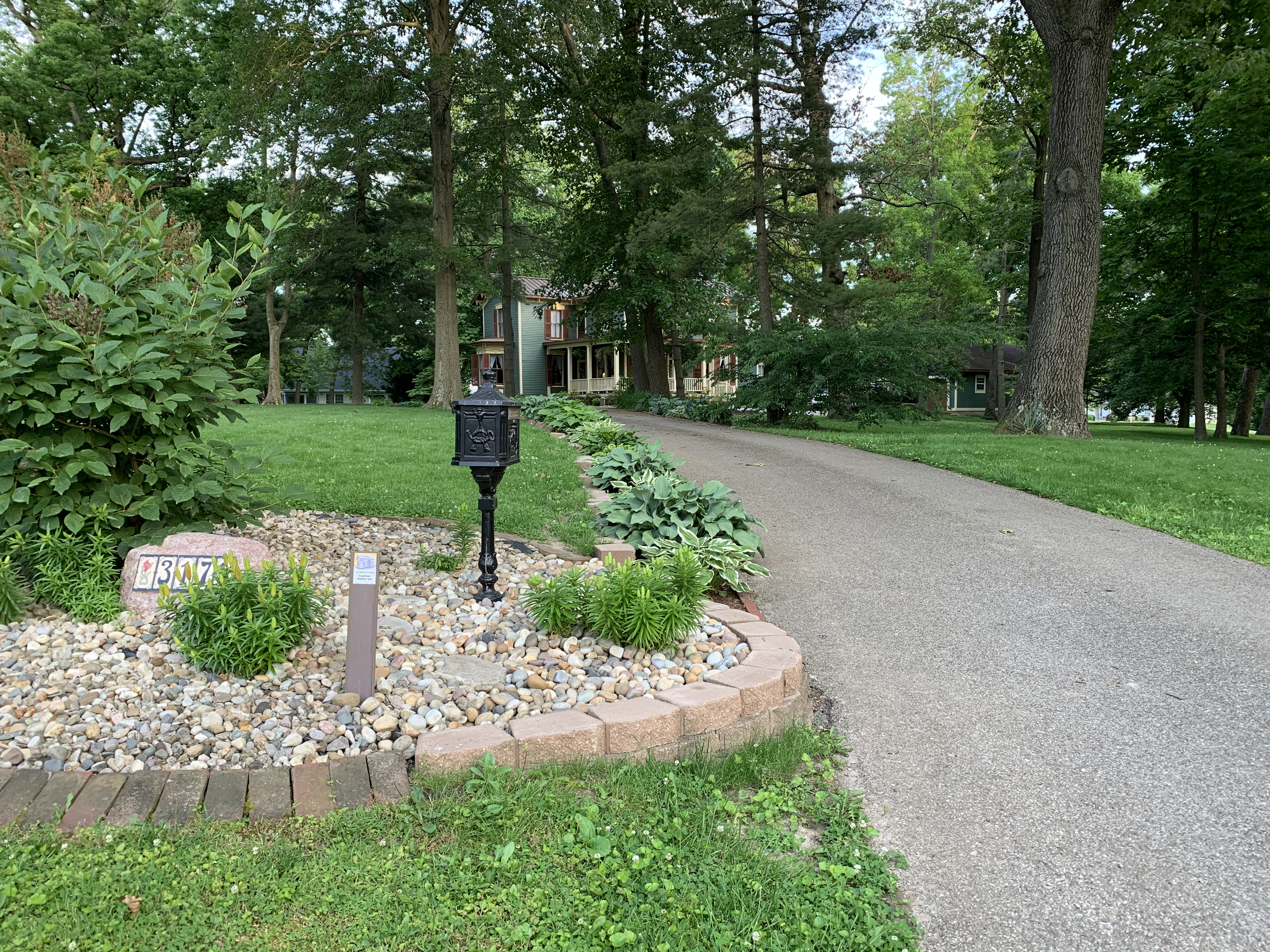
This photo of the William W. Jarvis house was taken in June 2020.

The entryway of the home features a curving staircase, with a large, octagonal carved walnut newel post at the base, turned spindles, and scrolled stair brackets. The handrail is constructed of seven pieces of solid, hand-carved walnut, each individually numbered and butt-joined. The first floor features marble fireplaces in the Italianate style in the front and main parlors, and a brick fireplace in the formal sitting room. The two main doors are solid wood with oval, beveled glass cutouts, in the Victorian style. All doors have transom windows above. A narrow stairway to the former maid's quarters on the second floor is concealed within an interior wall. The unique floor in the formal dining room consists of alternating slats of oak and walnut. Light fixtures throughout much of the house are the original gas futures which were subsequently converted to electric.

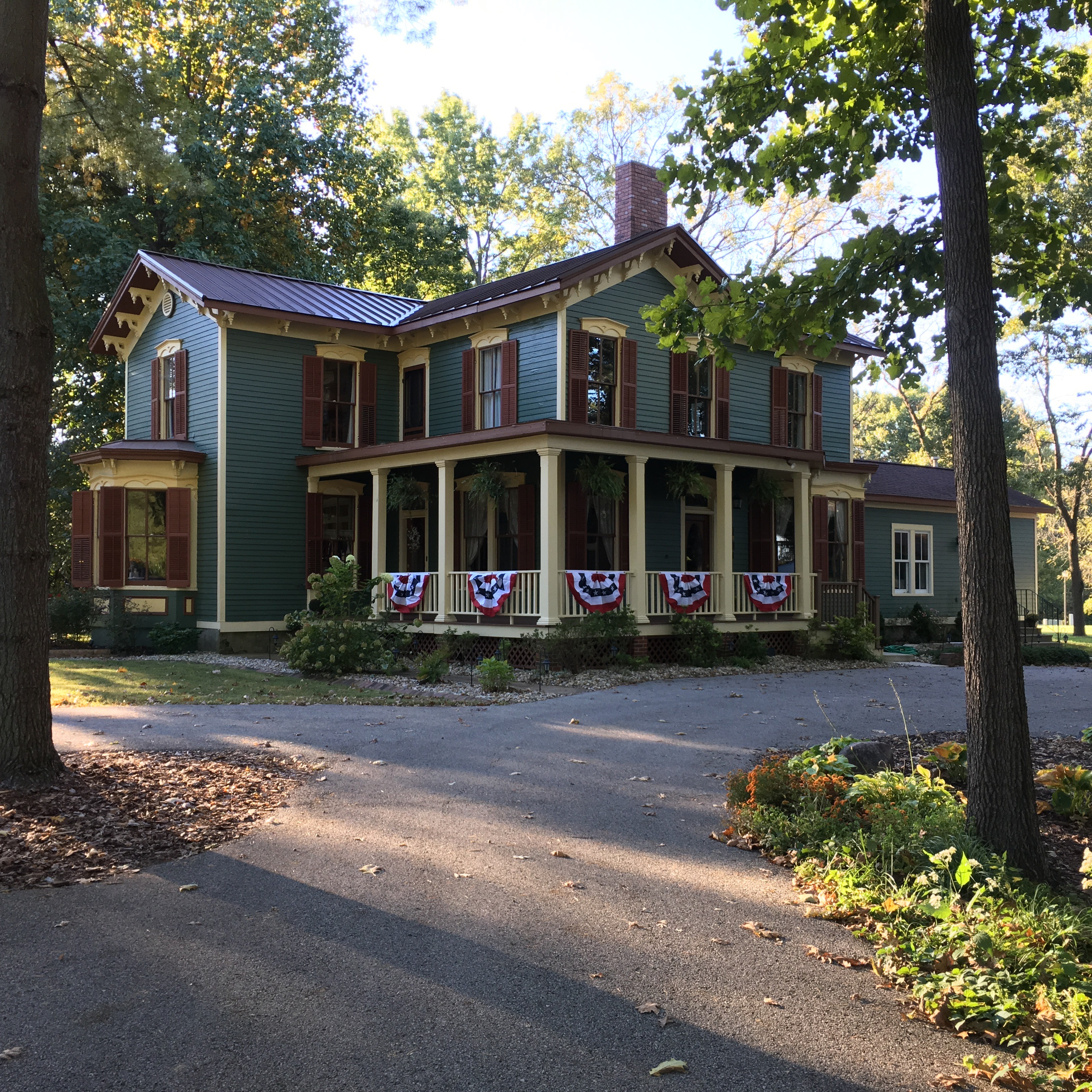
This photo of the Jarvis house was taken in October 2016.

Soon after construction, Jarvis made alterations to the house in the interest of gaining living space for his growing family. None of these alterations changed the fundamental structure and, as owner of Troy's lumber yard, his unencumbered access to fine construction materials enabled his ability to accomplish structural alterations with matching materials and little impact. Subsequent owners added an approximately 20 foot addition to the rear of the home and a detached garage, both of which are complementary to the original structure.

The grounds are heavily wooded, dominated by black walnut and white oak, but also containing an abundance of unique species—a previous owner was an ardent arborist.

William W. Jarvis lived in the house until his death in 1927, when his daughter, Bessie Jarvis Keller, took over residency. The house remained in the family for almost 100 years, and the current owners are only the third owners of the home outside of the Jarvis family.

=== Recognition ===
The home was named on the National Register of Historic Places on 3 Feb 1988, is the recipient of the Historic National Road’s Art & Architecture Plaque as one of the “Top 100 Art & Architecture sites on the National Road”, and has been recognized as historically significant by the Troy Historical Society.

== Sources ==
- Illustrated Encyclopedia & Atlas Map of Madison County, Ill. (1873). St. Louis, MO: Brink, McCormick, & Co.
- Norton, W.T., Flagg, Hon. N.G., & Hoerner, J.S. (1912). Centennial History of Madison County, Ill., and Its People, 1812-1912—Vol. I.
