= Caseyville Township, St. Clair County, Illinois =

Coordinates: 38°37′05″N 89°59′08″W

Caseyville Township
- Township
- Location in St. Clair County

- St. Clair County's location in Illinois
- Country: United States
- State: Illinois
- County: St. Clair
- Established: November 6, 1883

Area
  - Total: 35.11 sq mi (90.9 km^{2})
  - Land: 34.87 sq mi (90.3 km^{2})
  - Water: 0.23 sq mi (0.60 km^{2}) 0.66%

Population (2010)
  - Estimate (2016): 31,152
  - Density: 917.5/sq mi (354.2/km^{2})
- Time zone: UTC-6 (CST)
  - Summer (DST): UTC-5 (CDT)
- FIPS code: 17-163-11657

Caseyville Township is located in St. Clair County, Illinois, United States. As of the 2010 census, its population was 31,996 and it contained 14,054 housing units.

== Geography ==
According to the 2010 census, the township has a total area of 35.11 square miles (90.9 km^{2}), of which 34.87 square miles (90.3 km^{2}) (or 99.32%) is land and 0.23 square miles (0.60 km^{2}) (or 0.66%) is water.

== Demographics ==
Historical population
Census	Pop.	Note	%±
2016 (est.)	31,152
U.S. Decennial Census
