= Pin Oak Township, Madison County, Illinois =

Pin Oak Township
- Township

- Location of Illinois in the United States
- Coordinates: 38°47′24″N 89°52′29″W
- Country: United States
- State: Illinois
- County: Madison
- Settled: November 2, 1875

Area
  - Total: 36.06 sq mi (93.4 km^{2})
  - Land: 35.59 sq mi (92.2 km^{2})
  - Water: 0.47 sq mi (1.2 km^{2})
- Elevation: 551 ft (168 m)

Population (2010)
  - Estimate (2016): 3,946
  - Density: 110/sq mi (42/km^{2})
- Time zone: UTC-6 (CST)
  - Summer (DST): UTC-5 (CDT)
- FIPS code: 17-119-60014
- Website: pinoaktownship.org

Pin Oak Township is located in Madison County, Illinois, in the United States. As of the 2010 census, its population was 3,916 and it contained 1,379 housing units.

== History ==
Pin Oak Township was named from a grove of pin oak trees.

== Geography ==
According to the 2010 census, the township has a total area of 36.06 square miles (93.4 km^{2}), of which 35.59 square miles (92.2 km^{2}) (or 98.70%) is land and 0.47 square miles (1.2 km^{2}) (or 1.30%) is water.

== Demographics ==
Historical population
Census	Pop.	Note	%±
2016 (est.)	3,946
U.S. Decennial Census
