= William Collins House (Fall River, Massachusetts) =

Historic house in Massachusetts, United States

- U.S. National Register of Historic Places
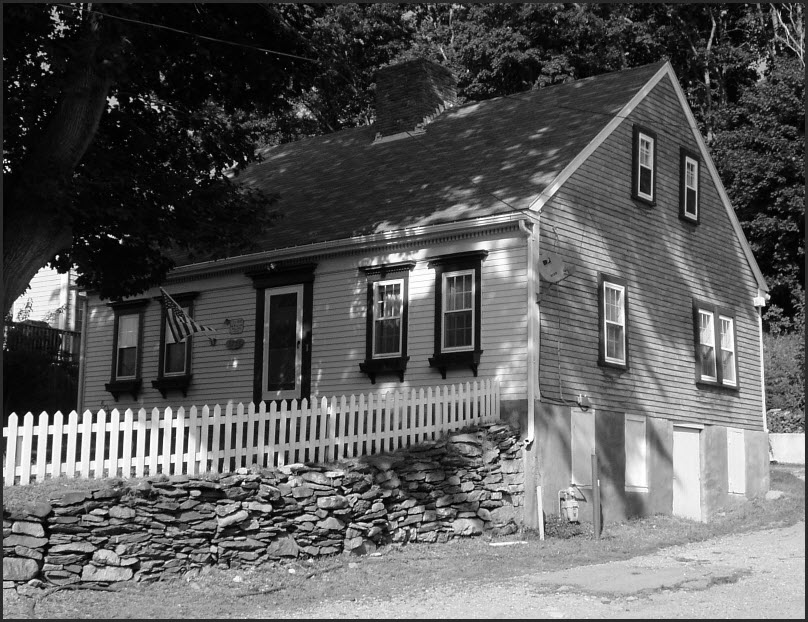

- Location within Massachusetts Location within the United States
- Location: Fall River, Massachusetts
- Coordinates: 41°43′15″N 71°7′29″W
- Built: 1800
- Architectural style: Federal
- MPS: Fall River MRA
- NRHP reference No.: 83000654
- Added to NRHP: February 16, 1983

The William Collins House is a historic house in Fall River, Massachusetts. It was built in 1800 and added to the National Register of Historic Places in 1983.

The house is a small 1 1/2-story vernacular farmhouse with the typical five-bay, center chimney plan. It has window trim elements that are probably a mid-19th century Italianate addition. It is one of six houses in the Steep Brook area considered to be the best representatives of the pre-industrial era of the city's history, amplified by the house's setting on a large and semi-rural lot.

== See also ==
- National Register of Historic Places listings in Fall River, Massachusetts
