= Collinsville Township, Madison County, Illinois =

Collinsville Township
- Township

- Location of Illinois in the United States
- Coordinates: 38°42′01″N 89°58′54″W
- Country: United States
- State: Illinois
- County: Madison
- Settled: November 2, 1875

Area
  - Total: 35.73 sq mi (92.5 km^{2})
  - Land: 34.86 sq mi (90.3 km^{2})
  - Water: 0.87 sq mi (2.3 km^{2})
- Elevation: 499 ft (152 m)

Population (2010)
  - Estimate (2016): 35,865
  - Density: 1,040.3/sq mi (401.7/km^{2})
- Time zone: UTC-6 (CST)
  - Summer (DST): UTC-5 (CDT)
- FIPS code: 17-119-15612
- Website: www.collinsvilletownship.org

Collinsville Township is located in Madison County, Illinois, in the United States. As of the 2010 census, its population was 36,265 and it contained 16,407 housing units.

== History ==
Collinsville Township takes its name from the city of Collinsville.

== Geography ==
According to the 2010 census, the township has a total area of 35.73 square miles (92.5 km^{2}), of which 34.86 square miles (90.3 km^{2}) (or 97.57%) is land and 0.87 square miles (2.3 km^{2}) (or 2.43%) is water.

== Demographics ==
Historical population
Census	Pop.	Note	%±
2016 (est.)	35,865
U.S. Decennial Census
