= William Collins House (Madison, Wisconsin) =

Historic house in Wisconsin, United States

- U.S. National Register of Historic Places
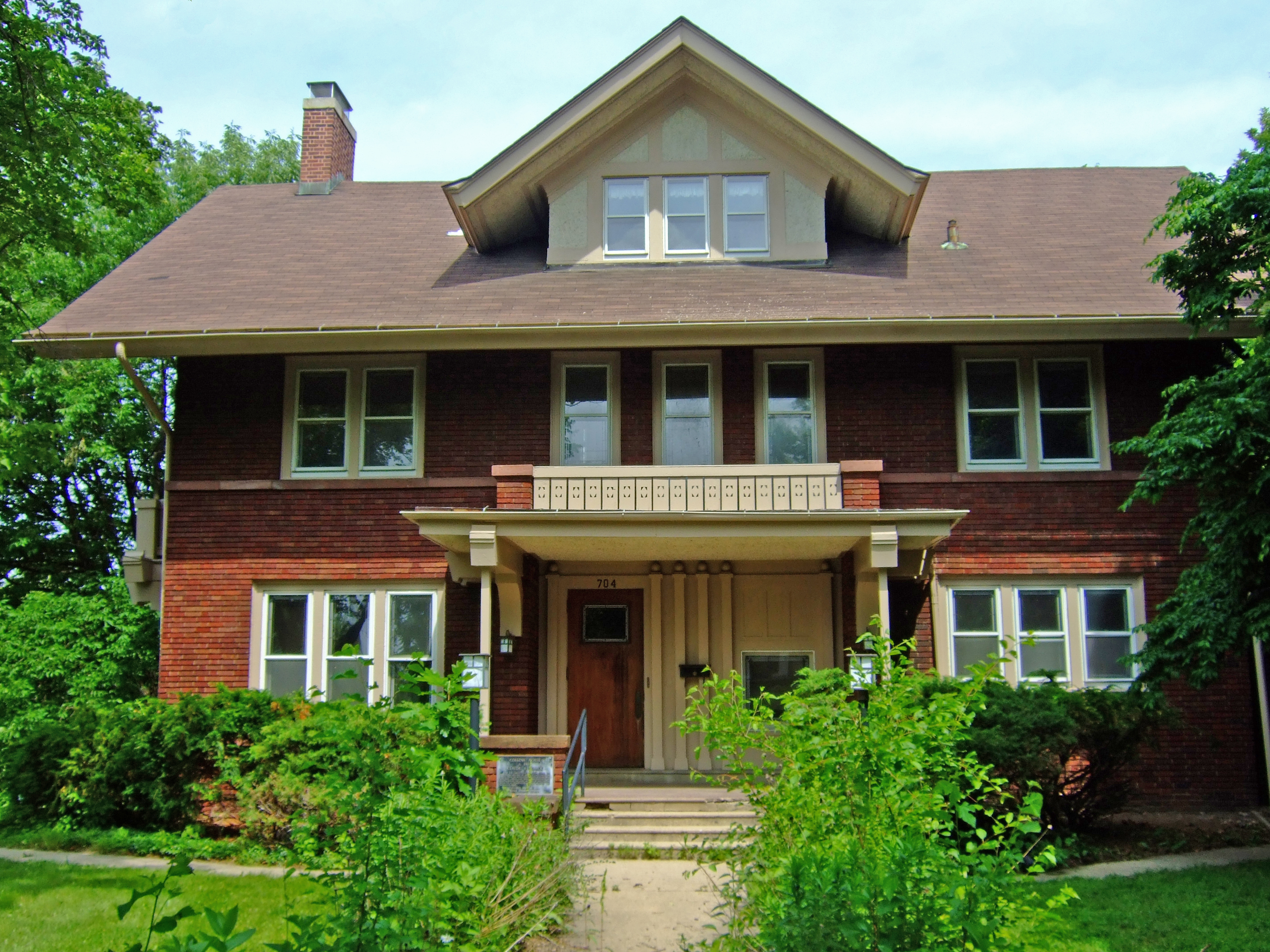
- June, 2009

- Location within Wisconsin Location within the United States
- Location: 704 E. Gorham St. Madison, Wisconsin
- Coordinates: 43°4′58″N 89°22′50″W
- Built: c. 1911
- Architect: Claude and Starck
- Architectural style: Prairie School
- NRHP reference No.: 74000067
- Added to NRHP: December 3, 1974

The William Collins House is a Prairie style home built about 1911 above Lake Mendota, a half mile north of the capitol in Madison, Wisconsin. In 1974 it was added to the National Register of Historic Places as a locally significant fine example of Claude and Starck's residential work in the Prairie style.

== History ==
In the early 1900s as the logging boom in Wisconsin was winding down, William Collins and his brother Cornelius ran a business manufacturing and wholesaling wood products - Collins Bros.

In 1908 Cornelius and his wife Anna had the local architectural firm of Louis Claude and Edward Starck design them a home overlooking Lake Mendota, which still stands at 646 E. Gorham, across Blount Street from the house that is the subject of this article. Cornelius' house is 2.5-stories, with brick walls and a steeply pitched roof typical of Tudor Revival style. But it also sports a band of six windows across the front, characteristic of Prairie Style.

Three years later, brother William and his wife Dora had the same firm design for them the large home pictured. Where Cornelius's house had been more vertical and British, mixing some Prairie Style elements with Tudor Revival forms, William's house was more relaxed, pushing Prairie style in the direction of a bungalow and a Swiss chalet. Elements of Prairie style are the broad eaves, the horizontal emphasis in the front, and the small bands of windows. The false half-timbering in the dormer end is a Tudor element. The gable-roofed dormer and the balconies recall a chalet. Walls are dark brick. The roof was probably first covered with wood shingles or tile. A balcony hangs on each end of the house, with the one to the southwest supported by decorative brackets along the lines of those Louis Sullivan designed for the Harold Bradley house a few years before. Inside is oak woodwork and windows with leaded glass borders, typical of Prairie Style.

After the two brothers split their lumber business into two, Cornelius' daughter Irene and her husband Robert Connor worked in Cornelius' C.C. Collins Lumber Co. In 1920 they built a home next to Cornelius' house, at 640 E. Gorham. It is also dark brick, but in the Colonial Revival style that became more popular as Prairie Style faded. This pattern of a family building homes close together was more common in the past, when travel was more difficult and fewer existing homes were available to buy.

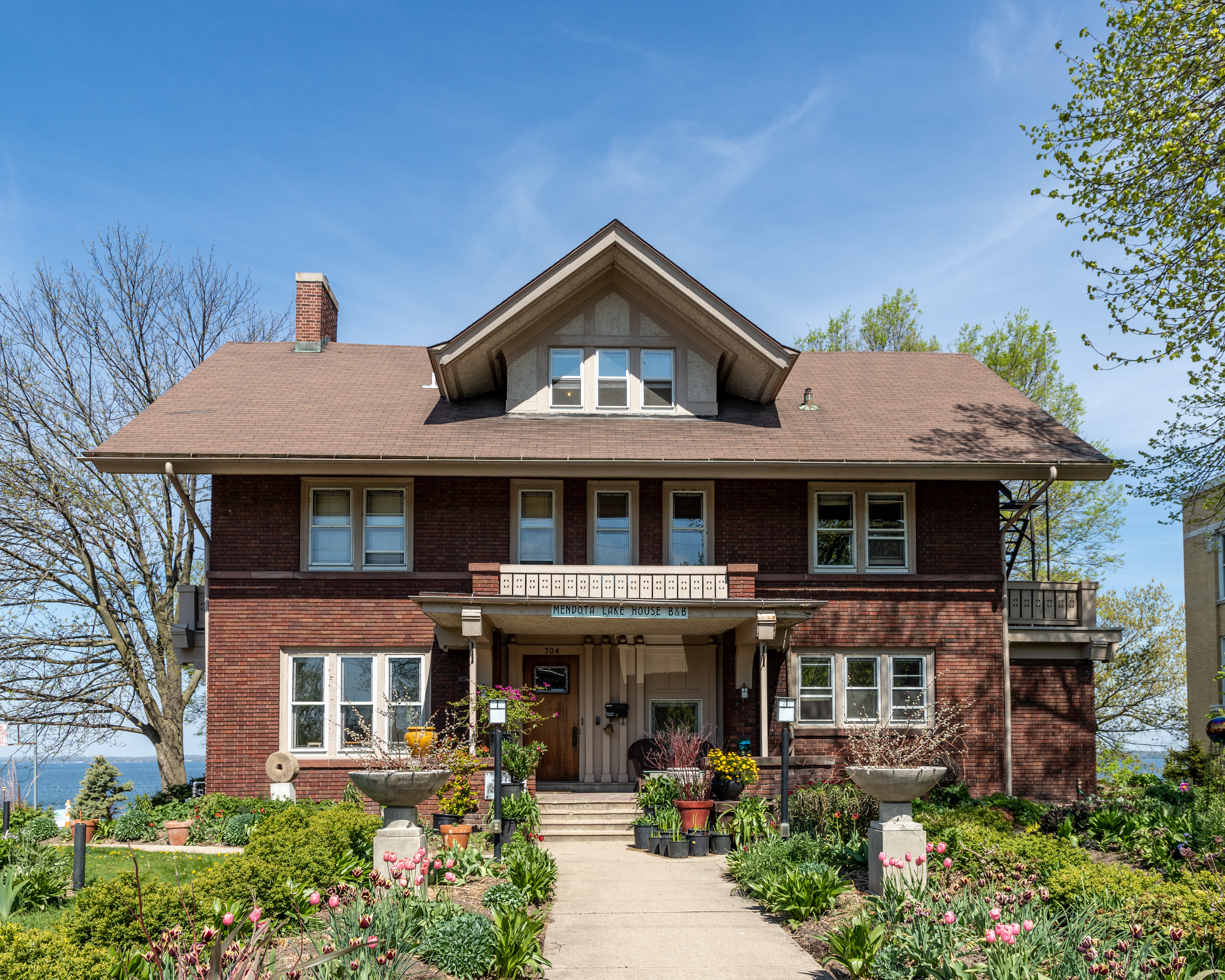
William Collins house, May 2021

William's house was later used by the City of Madison as the offices for the Parks Department. In 1975 it was designated a landmark by the Madison Landmarks Commission. Since 2013, the house has been operated by Bob Klebba and David Waugh as the Mendota Lake House B&B.

When William's house was added to the NRHP in 1974, architect Gordon Orr stated its significance thus:

The William Collins house is a fine example of Claude and Starck's residential work in the Prairie style and possess[es] architectural merit at a local level. Many of the homes designed by this firm still exist, and this building so well shows their full grasp of the compact-cubical form executed in the Chicago area by George W. Maher.... Yet, this building has features strongly its own.
