= Jackman Building =

- U.S. National Register of Historic Places
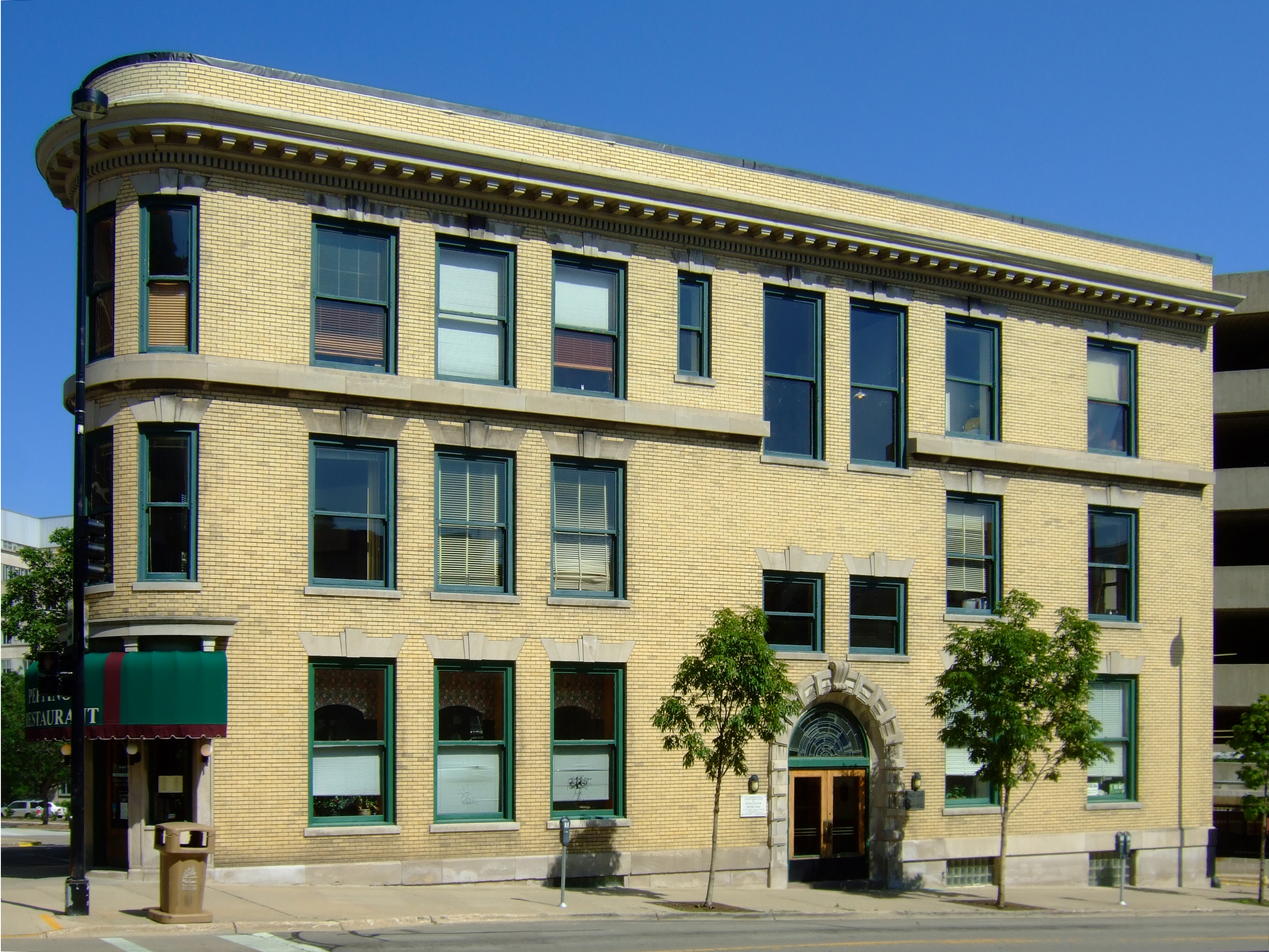
- Jackman Building, from across Hamilton St
- Location: 111 S. Hamilton St. Madison, Wisconsin
- Coordinates: 43.07266°N 89.38403°W
- Architect: Claude and Starck
- Architectural style: Classical Revival and Prairie School
- NRHP reference No.: 80000121
- Added to NRHP: March 27, 1980

The Jackman Building was built in 1913-1914 as office space a block south of the capitol in Madison, Wisconsin, designed by Claude & Starck with Neoclassical styling outside and Prairie Style influence inside. Still very intact, in 1980 it was added to the National Register of Historic Places.

== History ==
The building was constructed by the law firm of Richmond, Jackman and Swanson to house their practice. Madison architects Louis Claude and Edward Starck designed a 3-story cream brick building with a flat roof. John Findorff was the general contractor. The building's footprint is a right triangle to fit the lot, except for the corner toward the capitol, which is rounded. The exterior style is Neoclassical, with a denticulated cornice, with keystones above the windows, and with a line of trim between the second and third stories that echoes the cornice. The main entrance is a round-arched doorway with radiating voussoirs. Above the door is a stained glass window in a half-circle design, hinting at the very different style inside the building. For the inside, Claude & Starck went back to the Prairie Style which they used in many other buildings. Walls are painted plaster divided by birch trim boards. Light fixtures in the halls consist of glass globes mounted on horizontal and vertical metal bars.

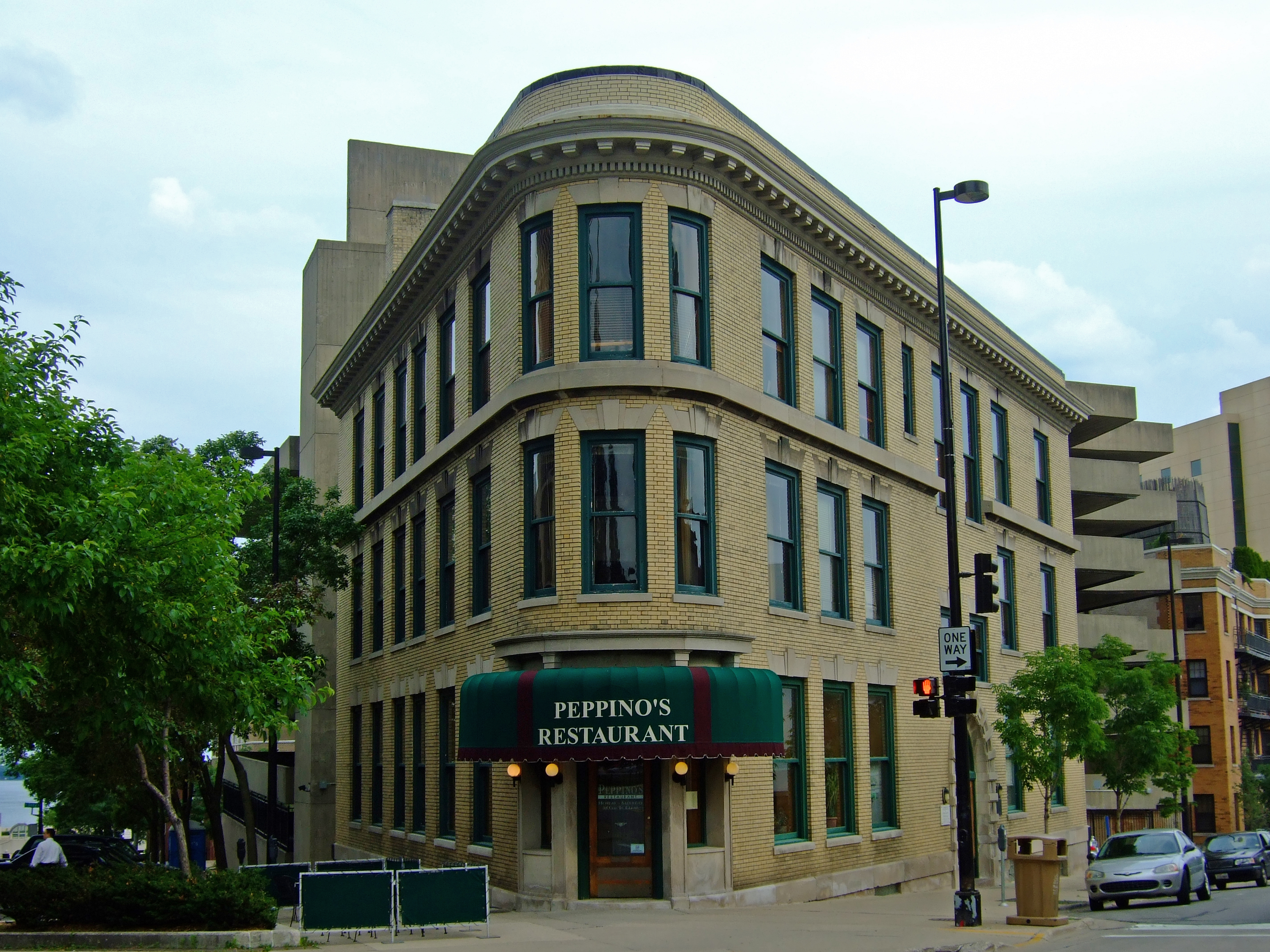
View down Carroll and Hamilton streets

Richmond, Jackman and Swanson and its variations generally occupied the second and third floors of the building until 1978. "Other tenants in the building included accountants, unions, private detectives, service organizations, insurance agents, and the Chamber of Commerce." In 1978, descendants of Ralph Jackman sold the building to Anne Taylor and Peter Wadsack.

In 1980 the building was designated a landmark by the Madison Landmarks Commission. It was added to the NRHP the same year, significant as "an interesting commercial design of the notable Madison firm of Claude and Starck... As an imposing early twentieth-century design representing pre-World War I development, it is a significant contributor to the Capitol Square area. With its Prairie School decoration inside, the building reveals its special regional identity, and its kinship with other works by its architects."
