= Claude and Starck =

American architectural company

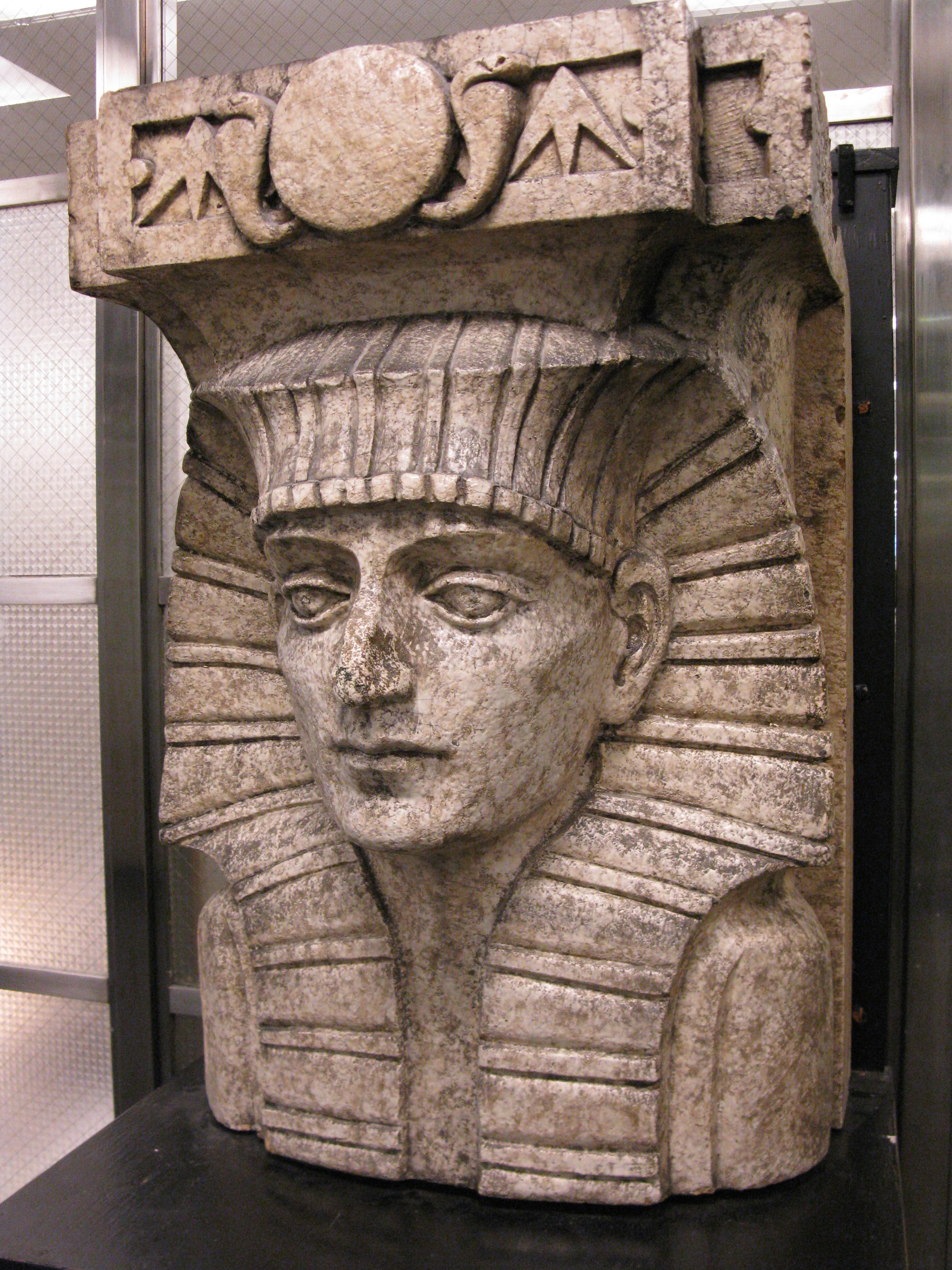
Ornament from the Levitan Building (1928) at 15-19 W. Main Street, Madison, razed 1974

Claude and Starck was an architectural firm in Madison, Wisconsin, at the turn of the twentieth century. The firm was a partnership of Louis W. Claude (1868–1951) and Edward F. Starck (1868–1947). Starck apprenticed with Edward Townsend Mix in Milwaukee. Established in 1896, the firm dissolved in 1928. The firm designed over 175 buildings in Madison.

== Madison buildings ==
- Allyn house (1914) 1106 Sherman Ave; contributing property to Sherman Avenue Historic District.
- Alpha Phi Chapter House Association Sorority House (1905) bluelines
- Alpha Tau Omega Chapter House "Gamma Tau of Alpha Omega"
- American Tobacco Company Warehouses Complex (1901, the west building, on the National Register of Historic Places since 2003)
- Andrew R. Whitson House, (1906) 1920 Arlington Place, contributing property to University Heights Historic District

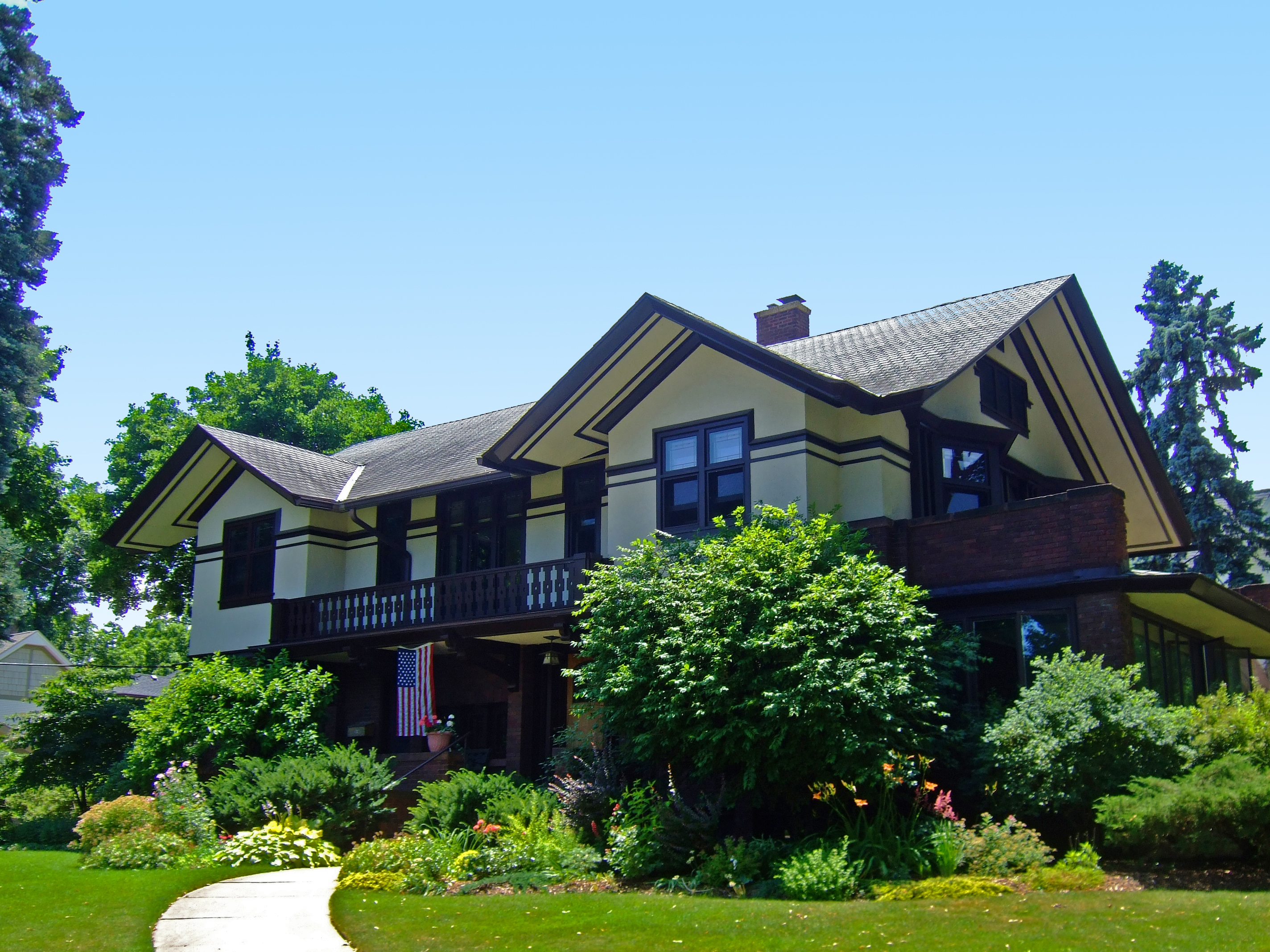
Larson house, 1911, Prairie style

- August Cornelius Larson house, (1911) 1006 Grant St, Prairie School, contributing property to University Heights Historic District
- Prof. Balthuasar H. Meyer house, (1902) 1937 Arlington Place, contributing property to University Heights Historic District
- Breese Stevens Field (1925-26)
- Castle & Doyle storefront, State Street
- Bascom B. Clarke House (1899, on the National Register of Historic Places since 1980)
- Claude House (1899; on the National Register of Historic Places since 1980)
- Cornelius Collins House, 646 E Gorham St, 1908
- William Collins House (ca. 1911; on the National Register of Historic Places since 1974)
- Doty School
- Doyle house (1928) 1028 Sherman Ave; Claude & Starck designed a remodel; contributing property to Sherman Avenue Historic District.
- Edmund Ray Stevens house, (1902) 1908 Arlington Place, contributing property to University Heights Historic District
- Edward A. Ross House, (1907) 2021 Chamberlain Avenue, Prairie School, contributing property to University Heights Historic District

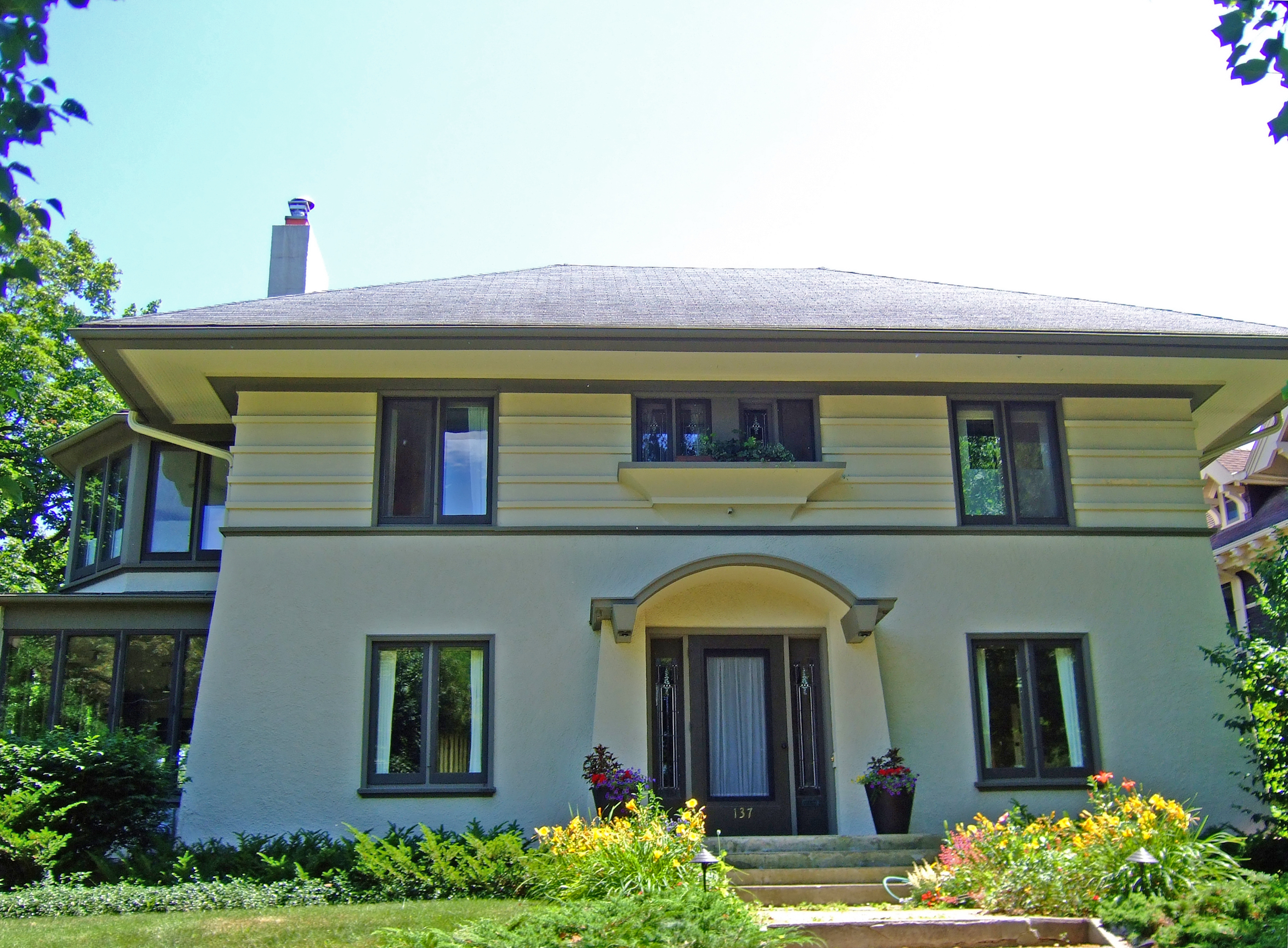
Elliott House, 1911, Prairie School

- Edward C. Elliott House (1910) 137 N Prospect Avenue, contributing property to University Heights Historic District
- Fay House
- Gary House
- Genske House (1913), 1004 Sherman Ave; contributing property to Sherman Avenue Historic District.
- Griswold house (1915) 1158 Sherman Ave; contributing property to Sherman Avenue Historic District.
- Charles Heyl House, 952-956 Spaight St., 1906.

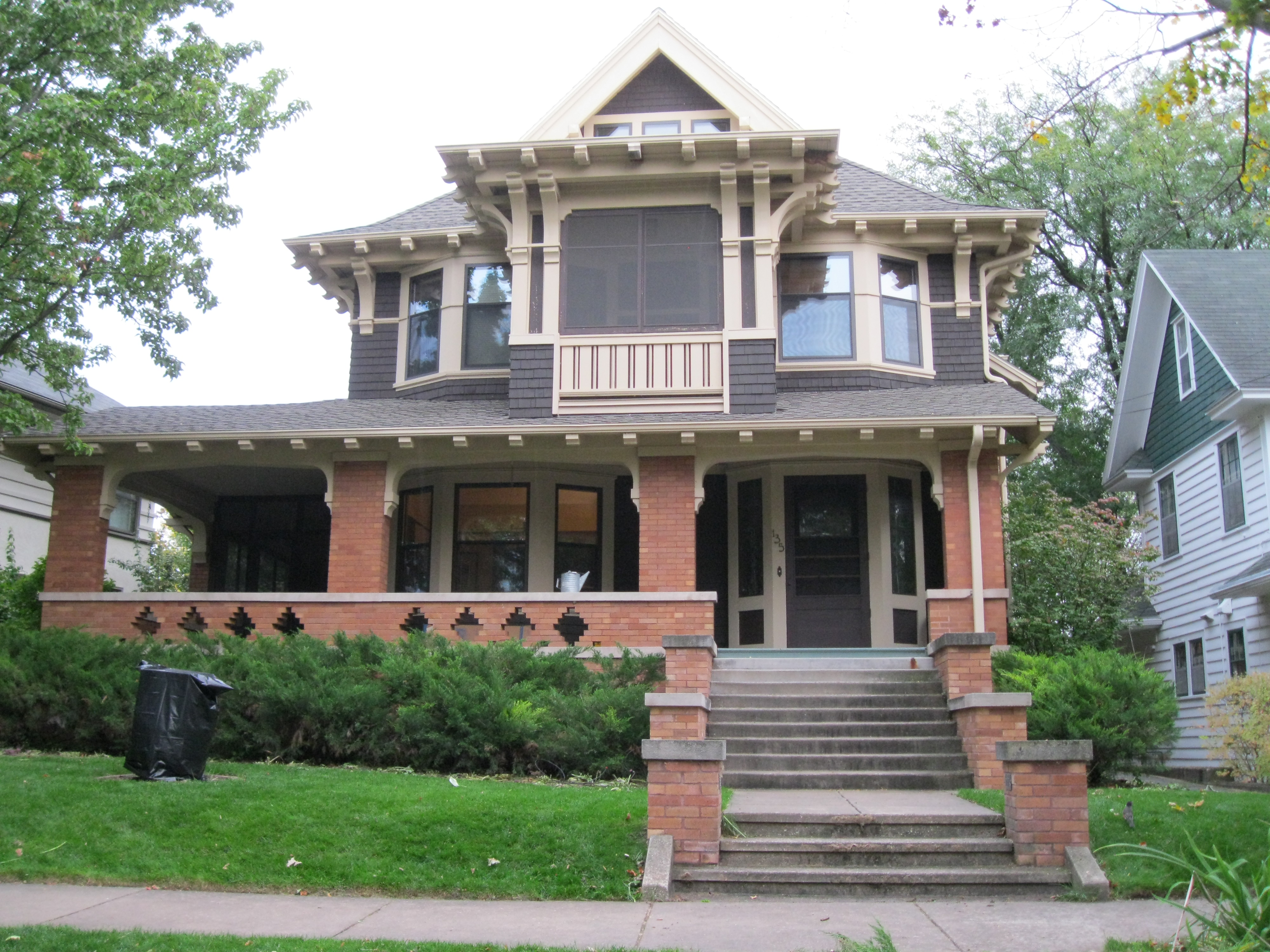
Tiemann house, 1911, Craftsman

- Harry D. Tiemann house (1911) 135 N Prospect Ave; contributing property to University Heights Historic District

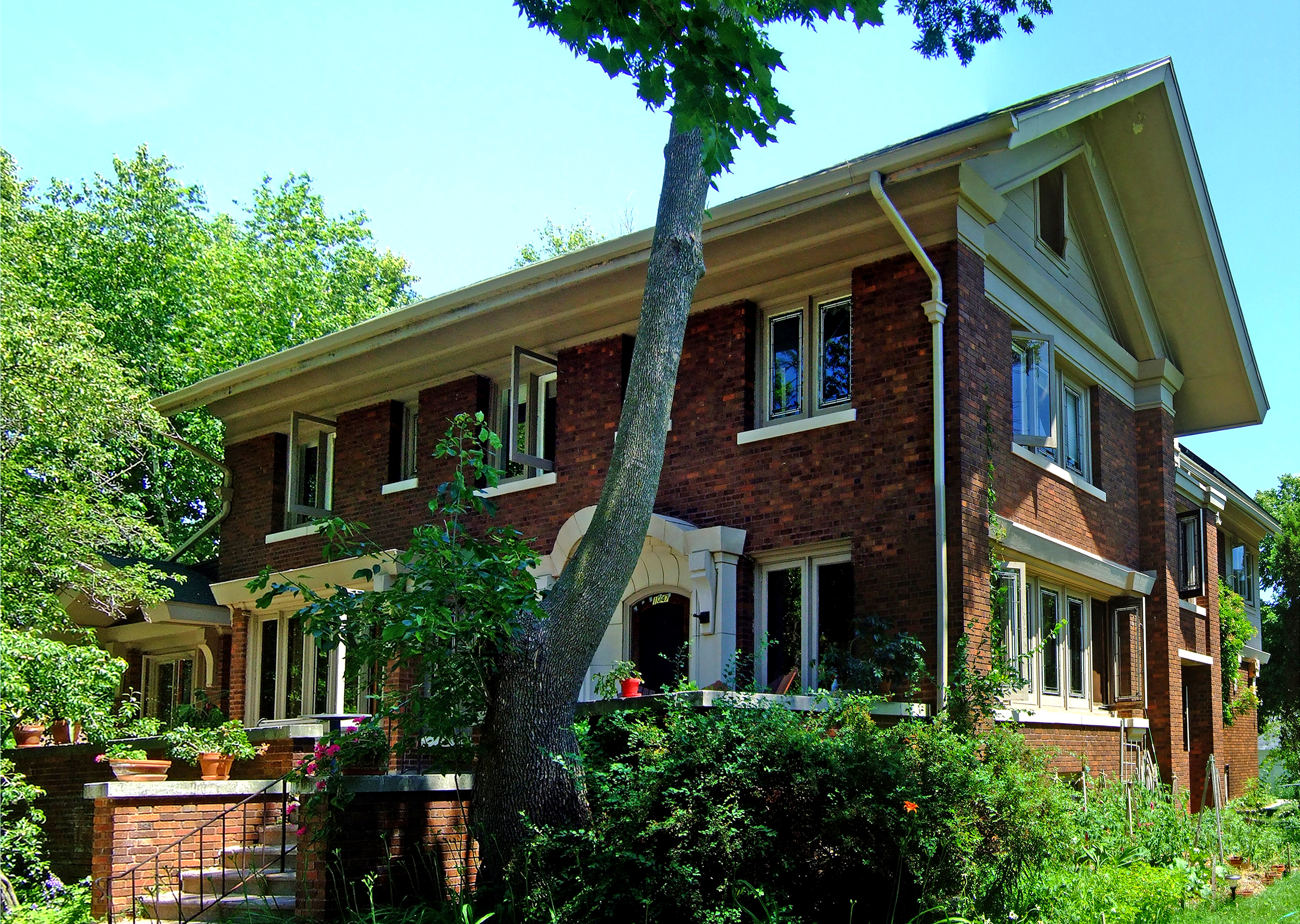
Hokanson house, 1916, Prairie style

- Hokanson house (1916) 1047 Sherman Ave; contributing property to Sherman Avenue Historic District.
- Jackman Building (1913-14; on the National Register of Historic Places since 1980)
- Kate Curtis bungalow, (1911), 22 N Prospect Avenue, contributing property to University Heights Historic District
- Adolph H. Kayser House (1902; on the National Register of Historic Places since 1980)
- Lamb Building (1905; on the National Register of Historic Places since 1984)
- August Cornelius Larson House (1911; on the National Register of Historic Places since 1994)
- Lincoln School (1915; on the National Register of Historic Places since 1980)
- George A. Lougee House (1907; on the National Register of Historic Places since 1978)
- Luther Memorial Church (1923; on the National Register of Historic Places since 2018)
- Madison Gas and Electric Company Powerhouse (ca. 1908; on the National Register of Historic Places since 2002)
- Majestic Theater
- Harlow & Isabel Ott House
- Phi Delta Theta chapter house
- Public Library Branch, Williamson Street
- Ralph Richardson House, 745 Jenifer St, 1908-09.
- Joseph & Frances Schubert house (1905) 1118 Sherman Ave; contributing property to Sherman Avenue Historic District.
- Oscar & Mary Schubert house, 932 Spaight St, 1906.
- Aquatic Bird and Fish Aquarium at the Henry Vilas Zoo, (1904) 702 S Randall, contributing property to University Heights Historic District
- Wiedenbeck-Dobelin Warehouse (1907; on the National Register of Historic Places since 1986)

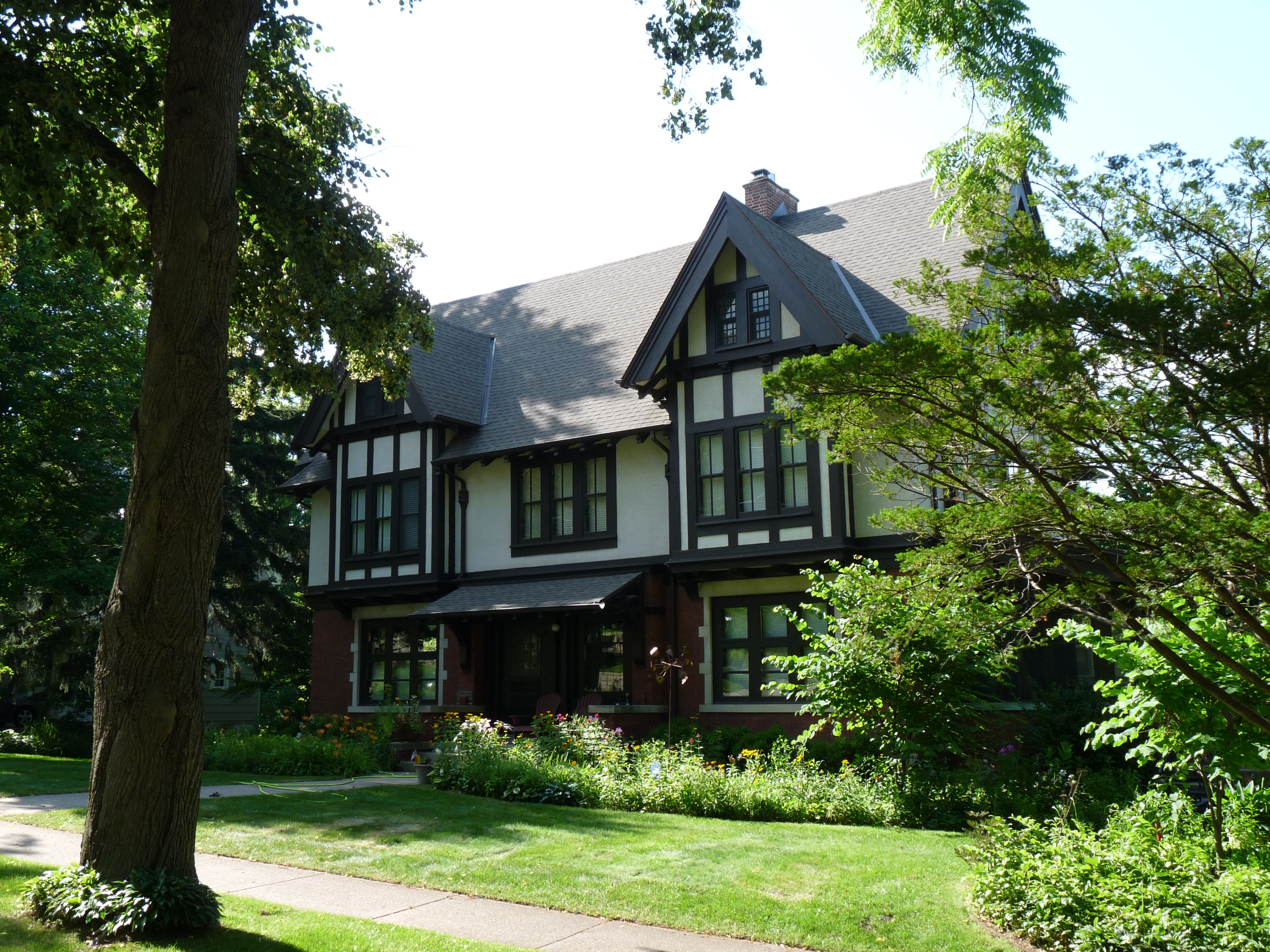
William D. Pence house, 1910, Tudor Revival

- William D. Pence house, (1910) 168 N Prospect Avenue, contributing property to University Heights Historic District
- Zimmerman Store and Apartment
- 1028 Sherman Avenue
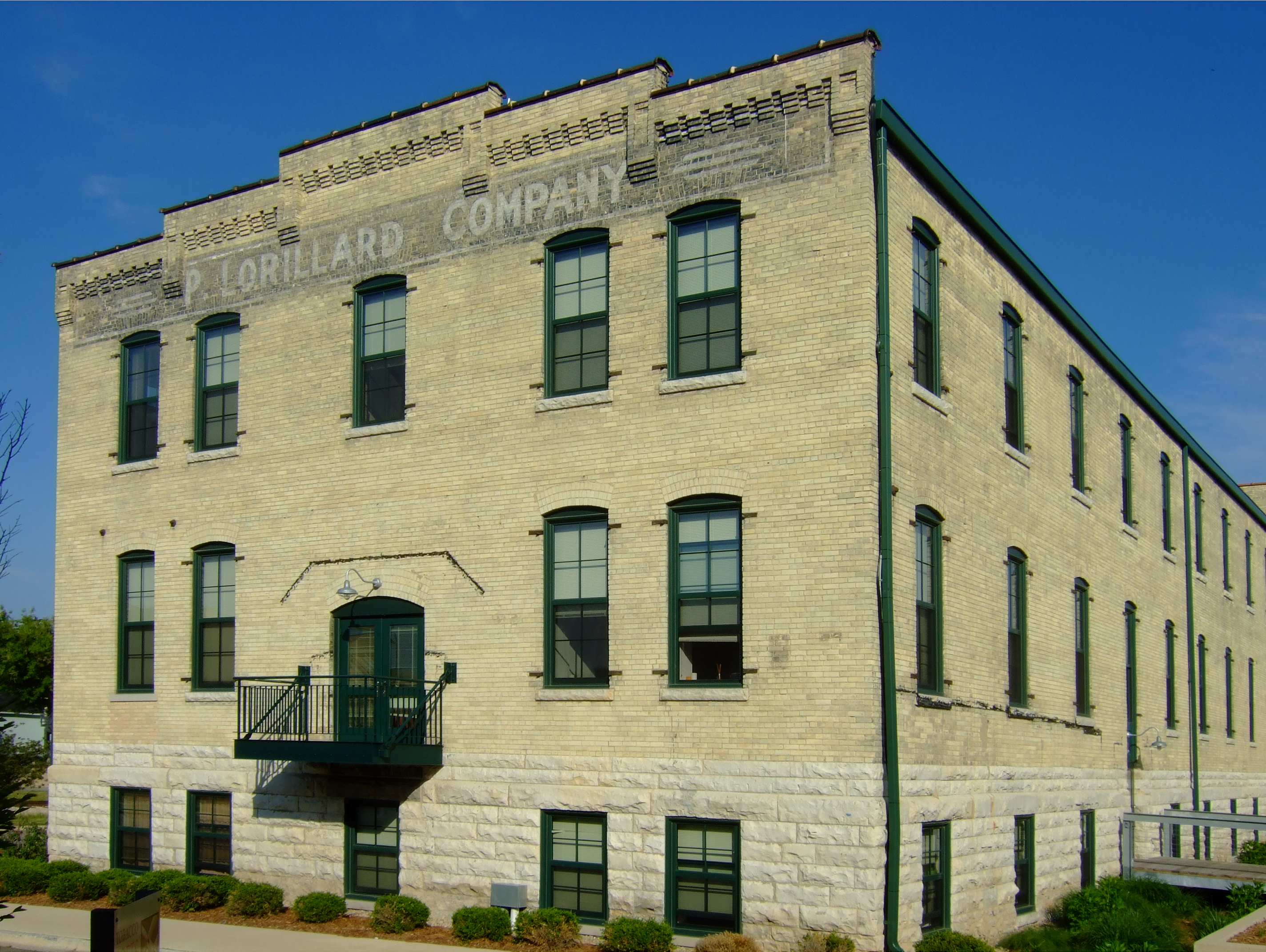
Part of the American Tobacco Company Warehouses Complex

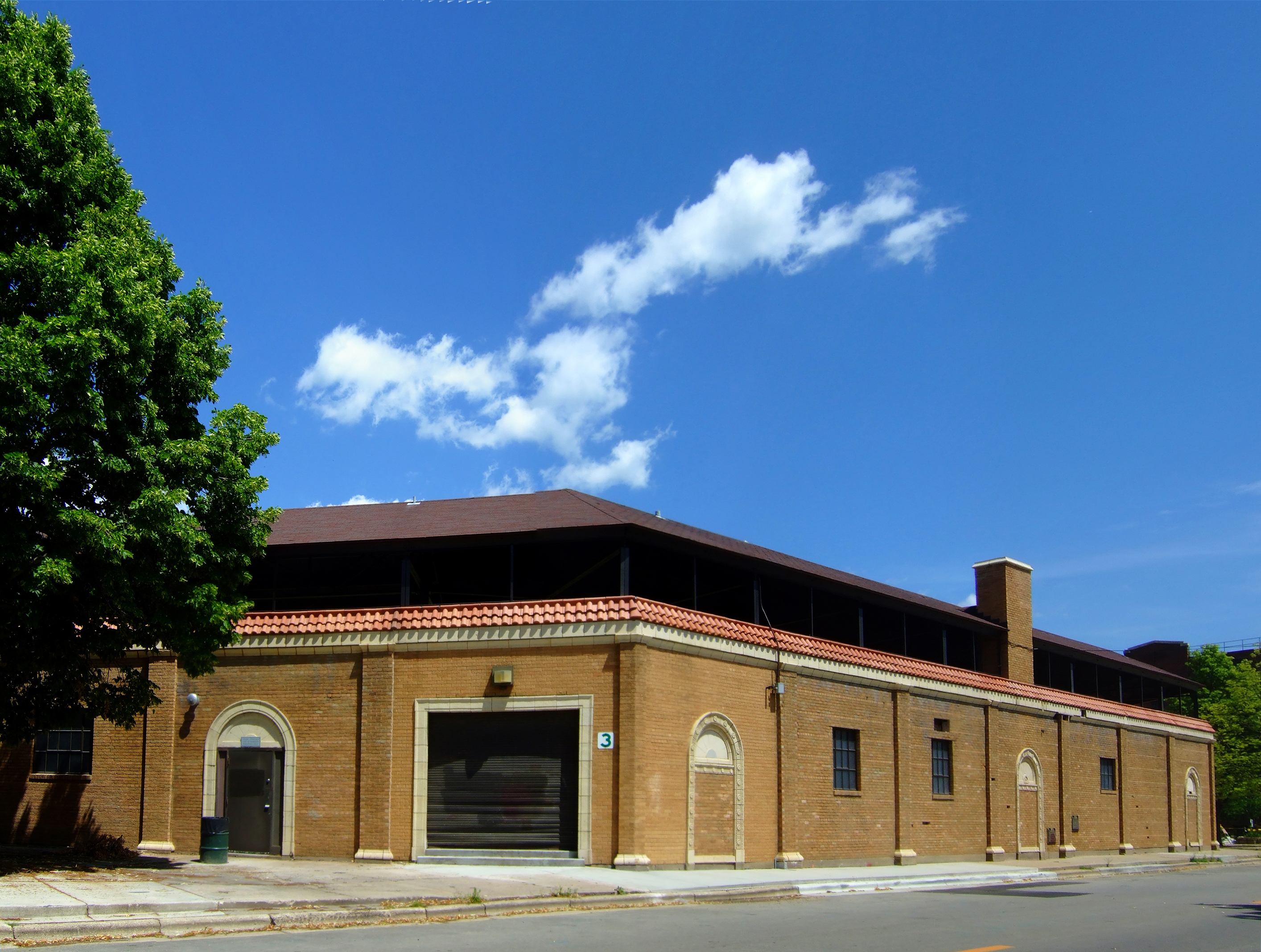
Breese Stevens Fieldhouse

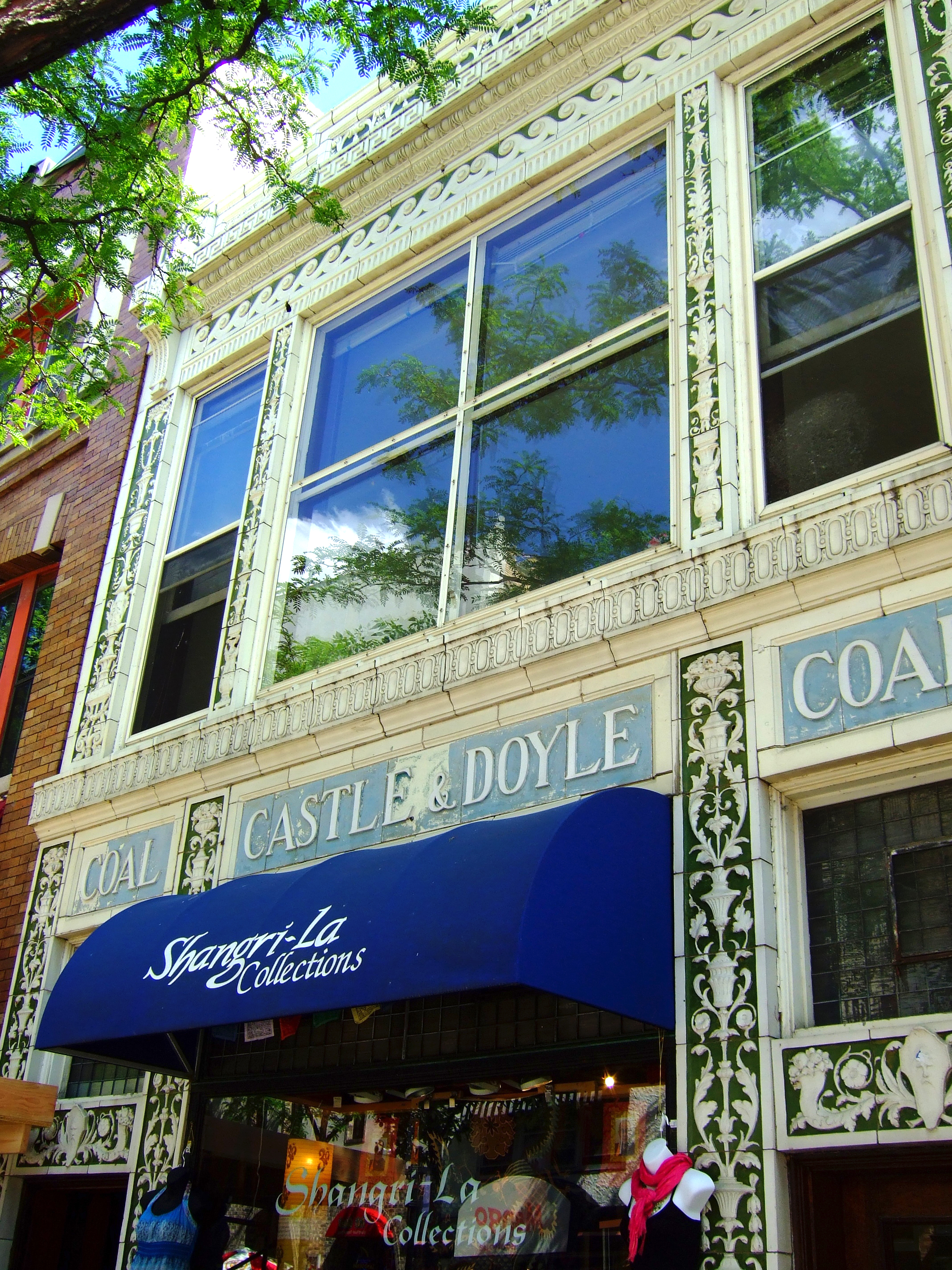
Castle & Doyle storefront

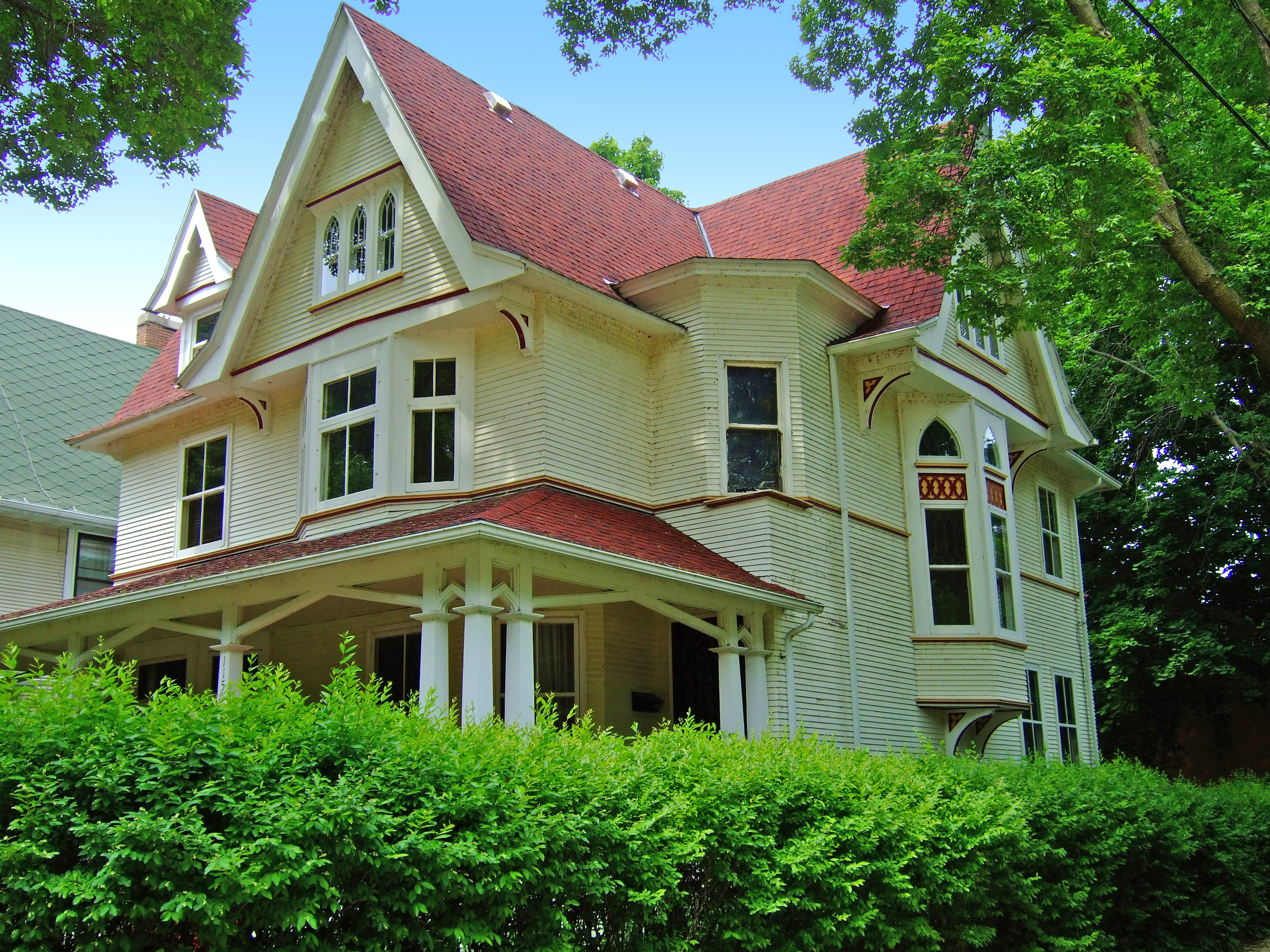
Bascom B. Clarke House

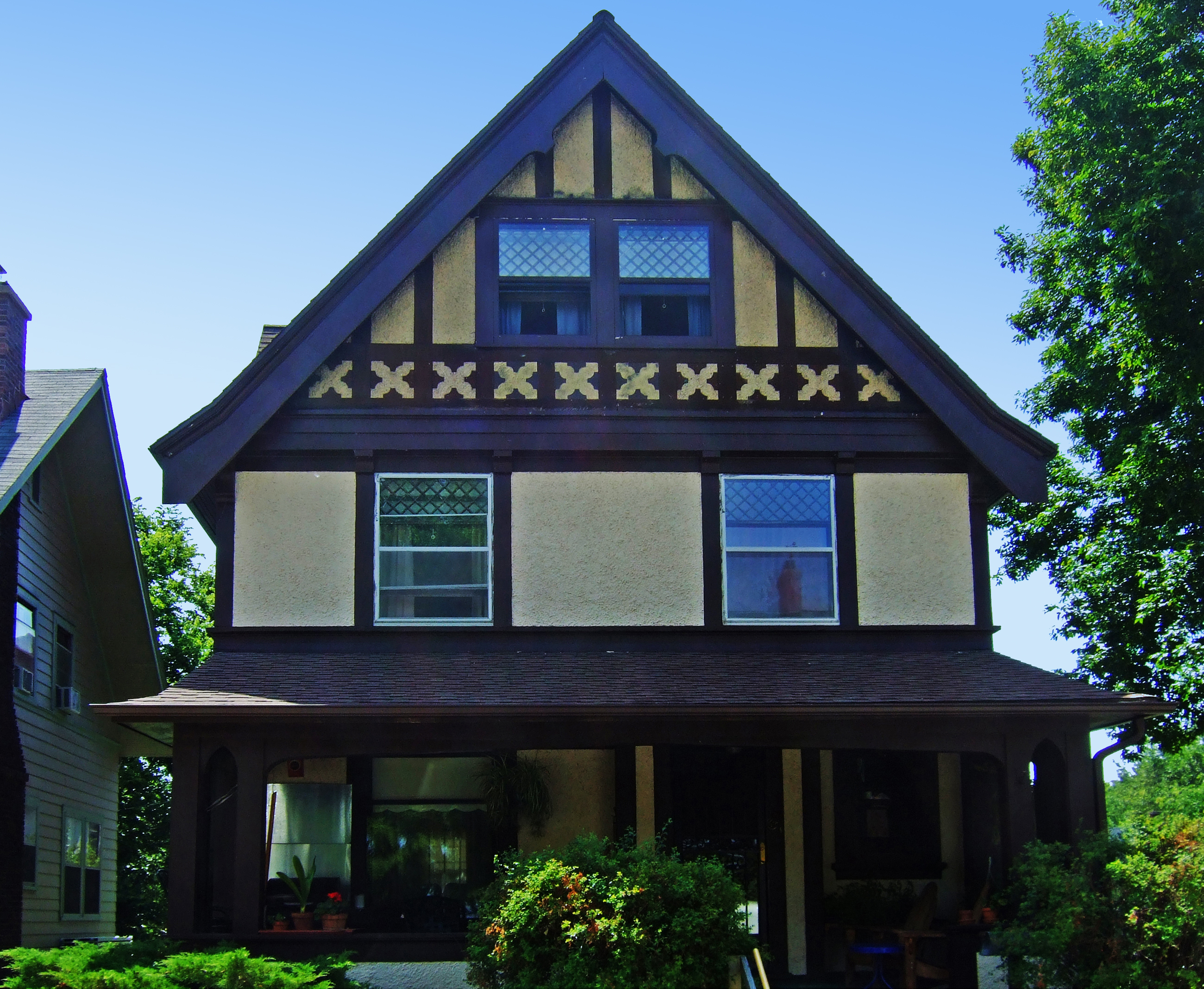
Claude House

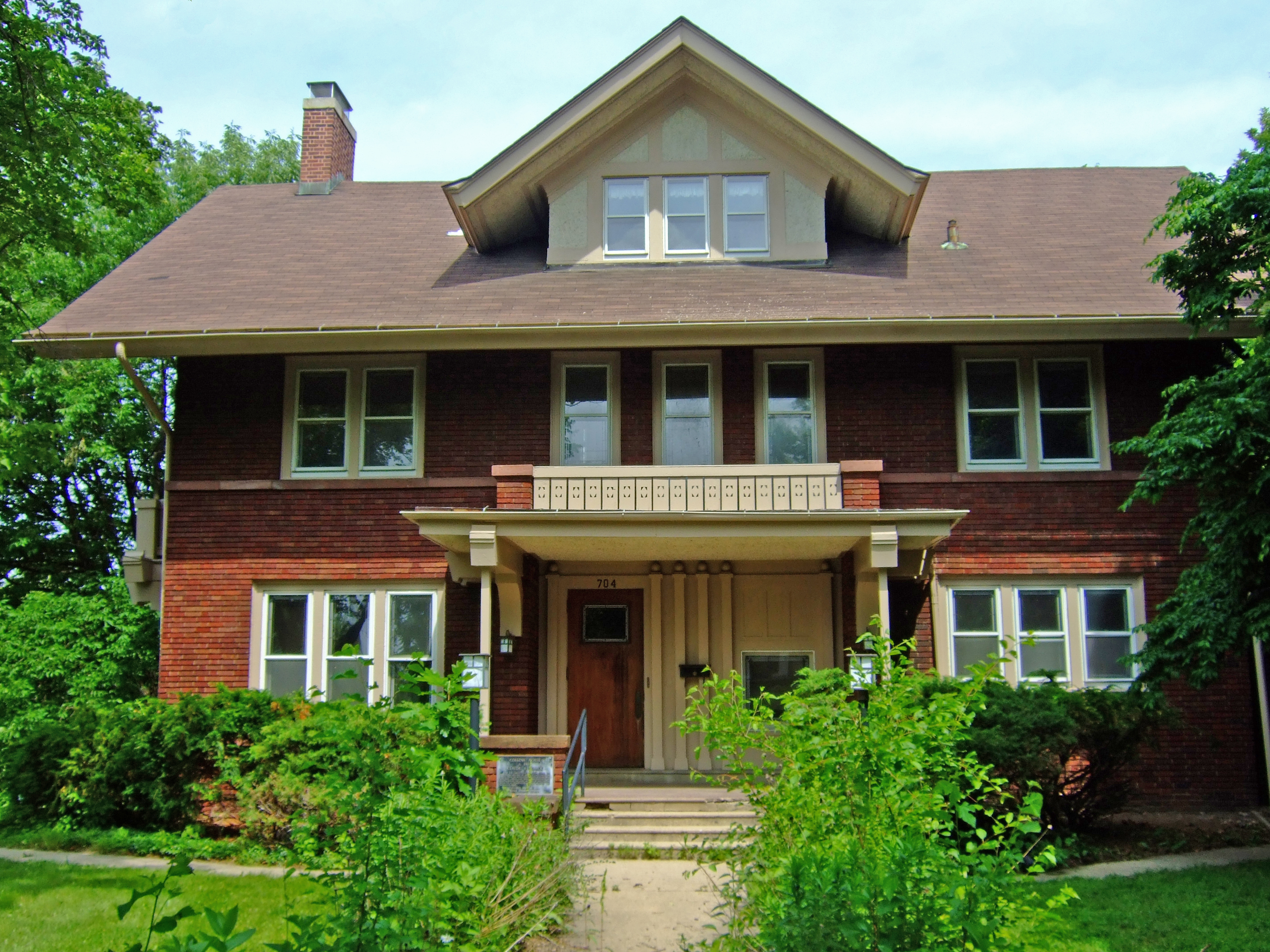
William Collins House

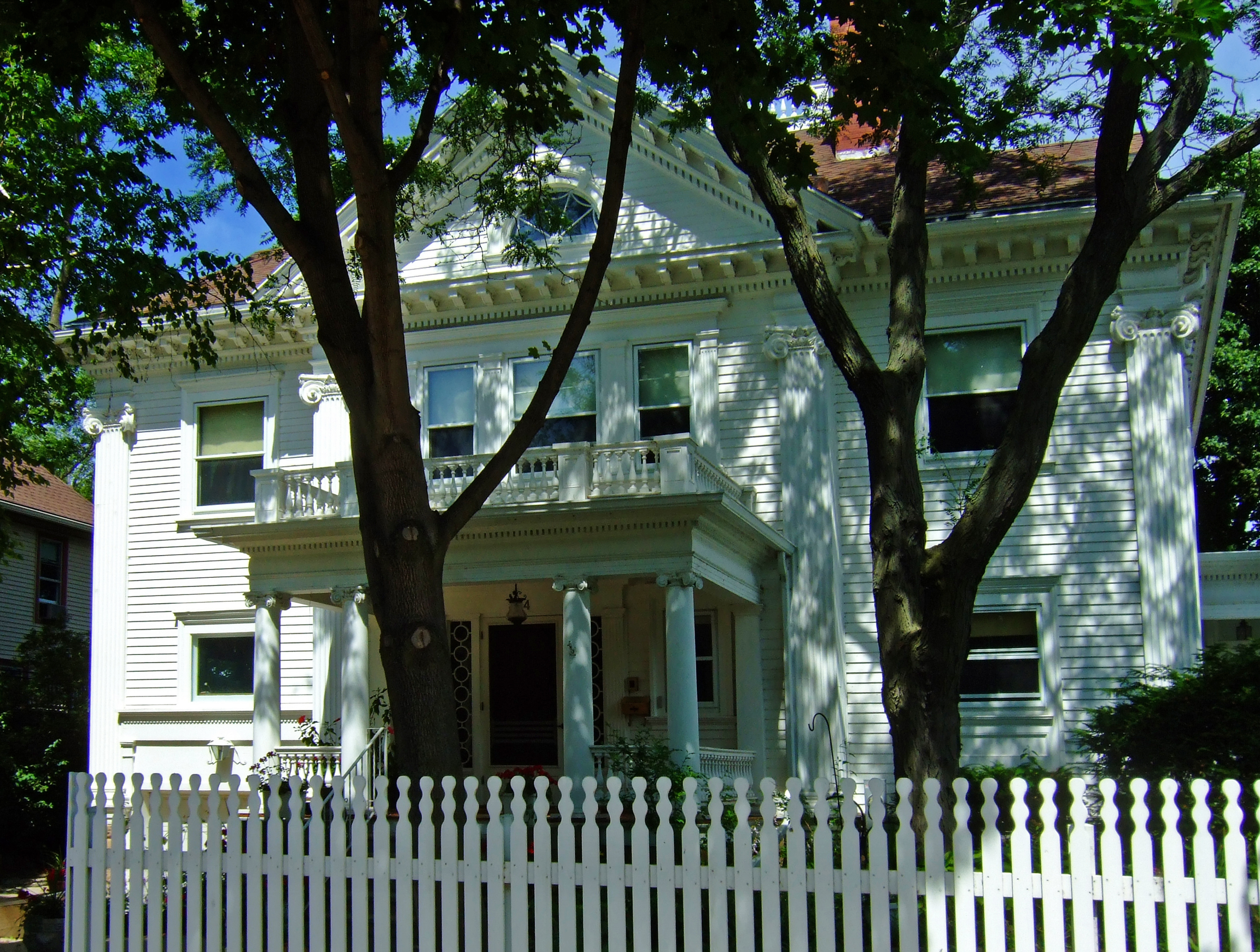
Fay House

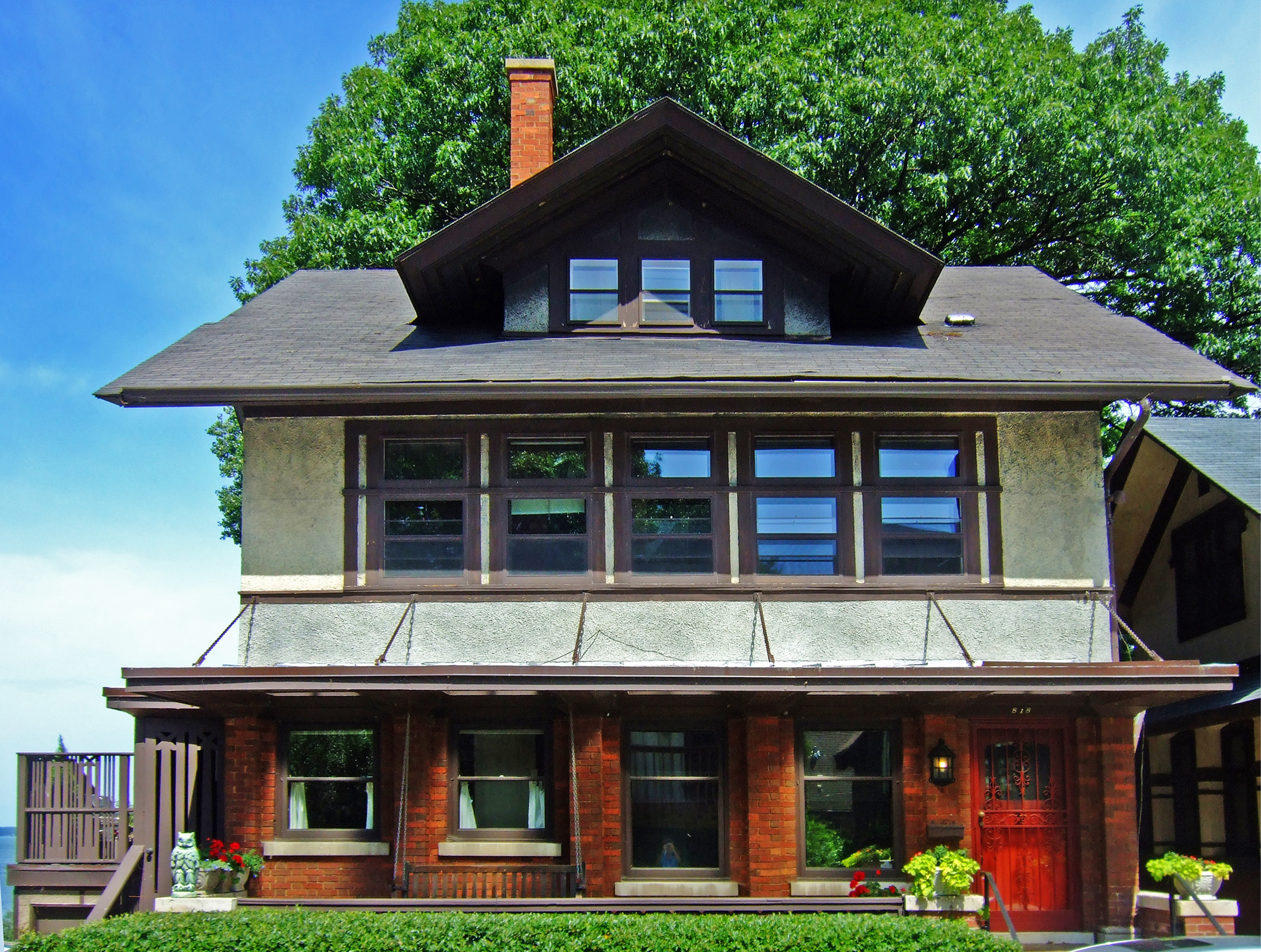
Gary House

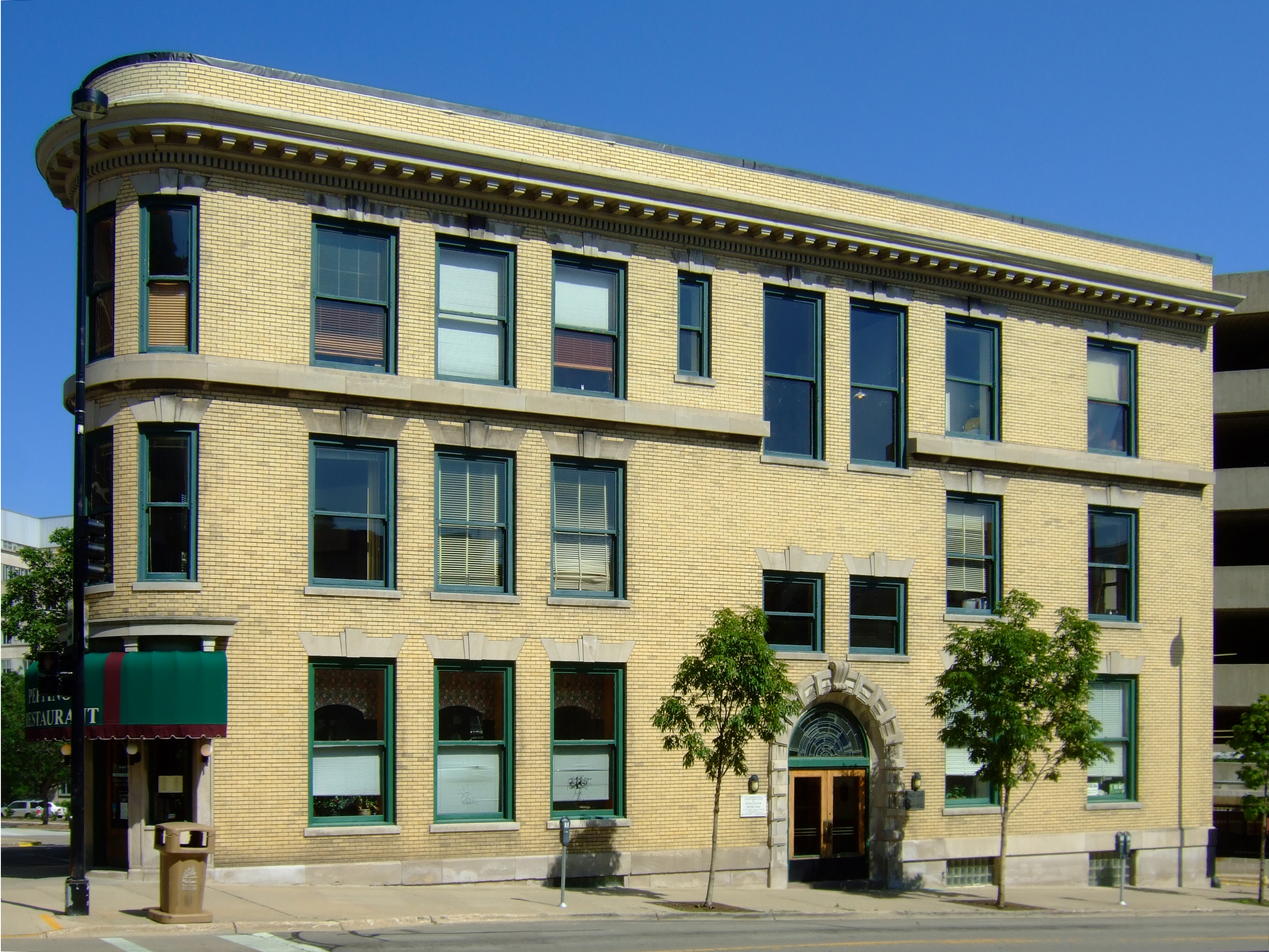
Jackman Building

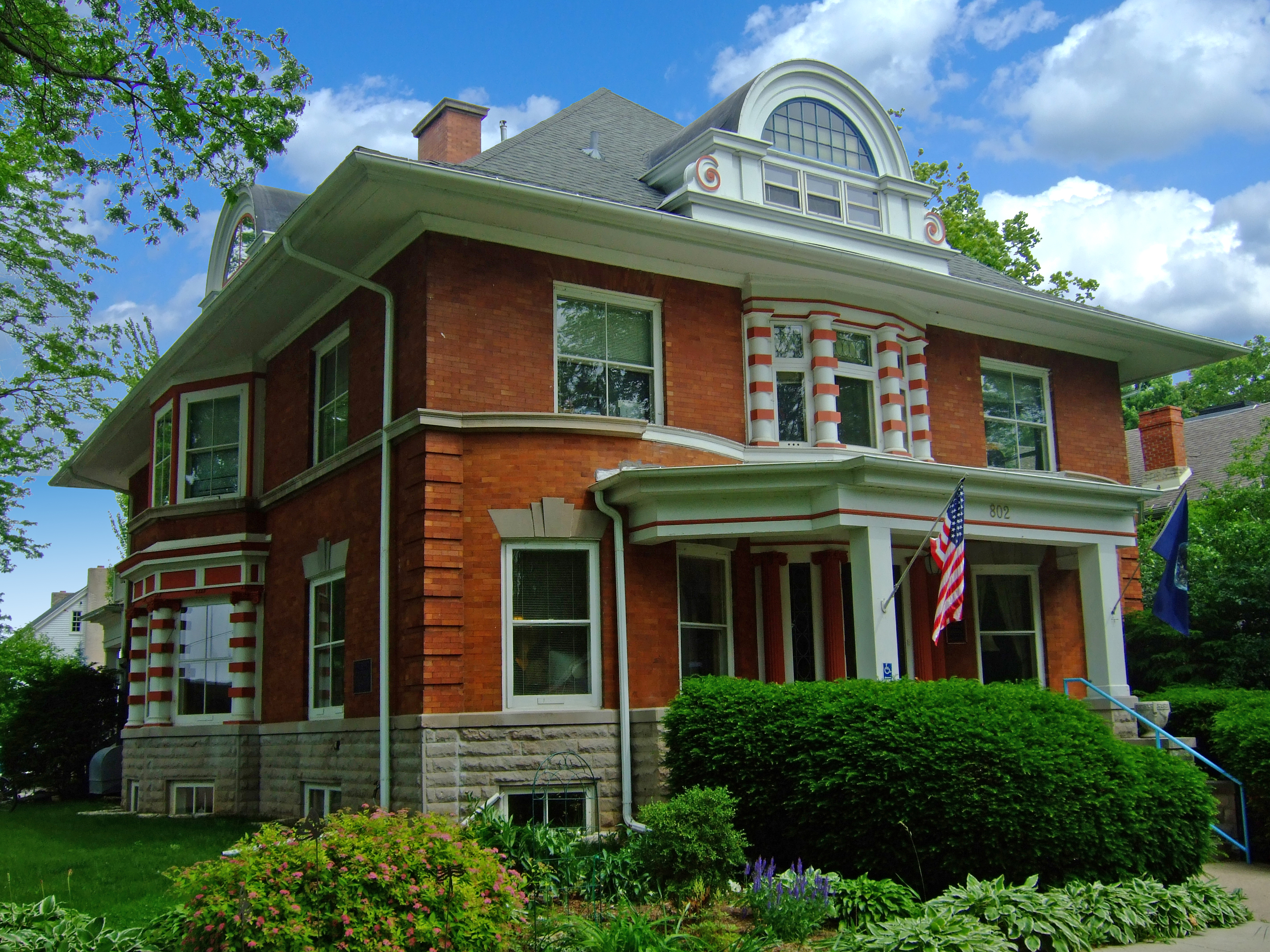
Adolph H. Kayser House

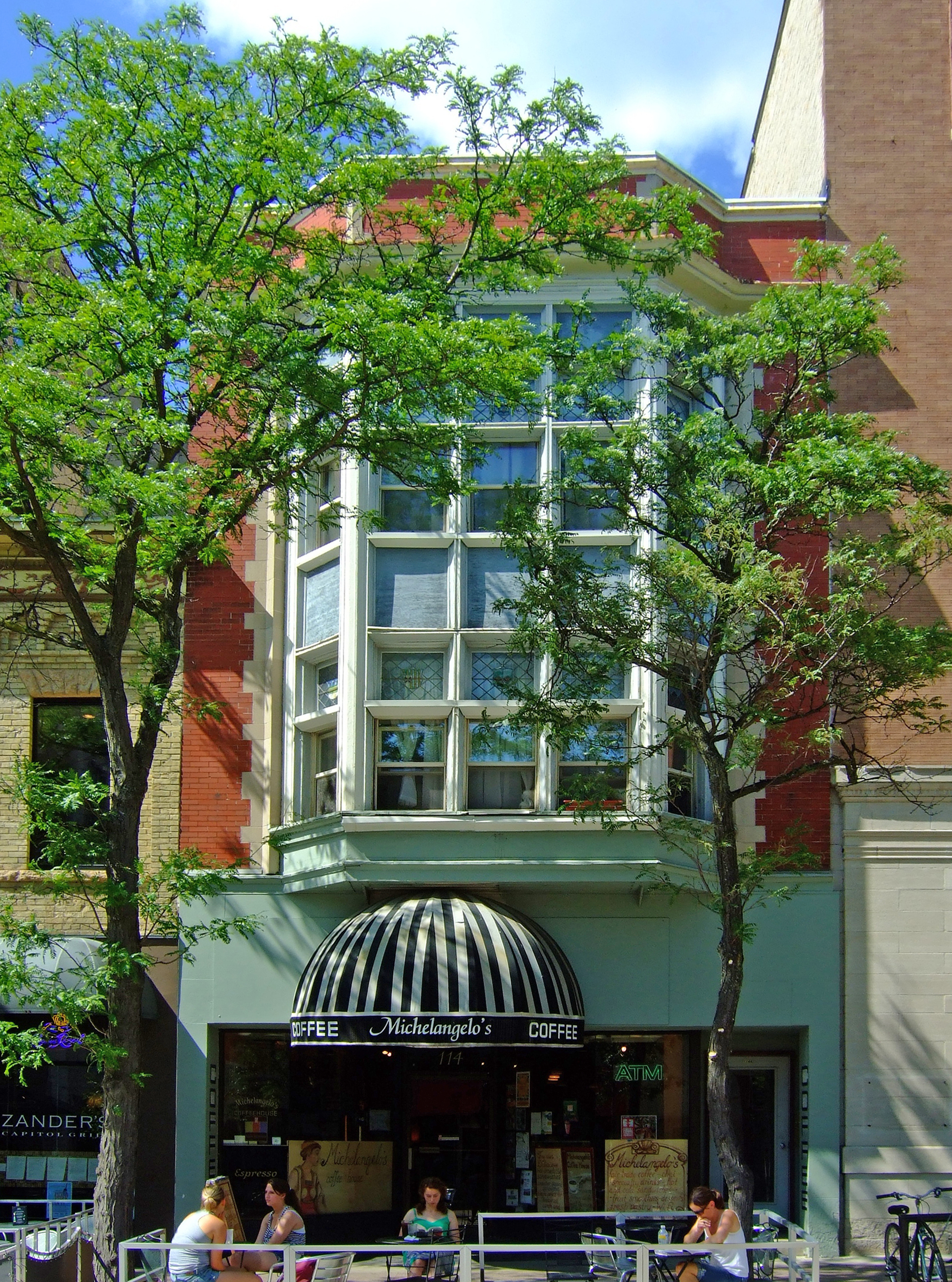
Lamb Building

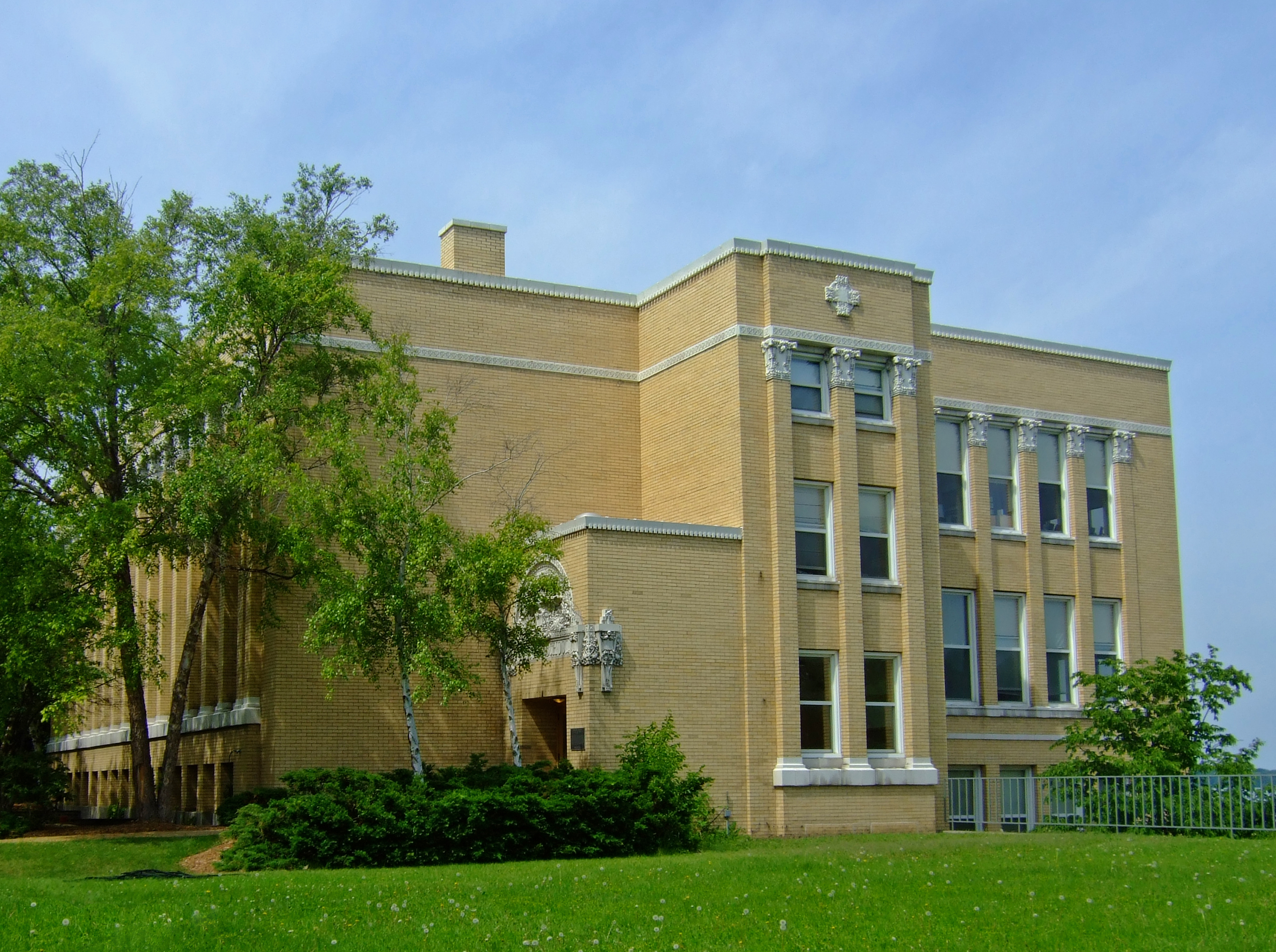
Lincoln School

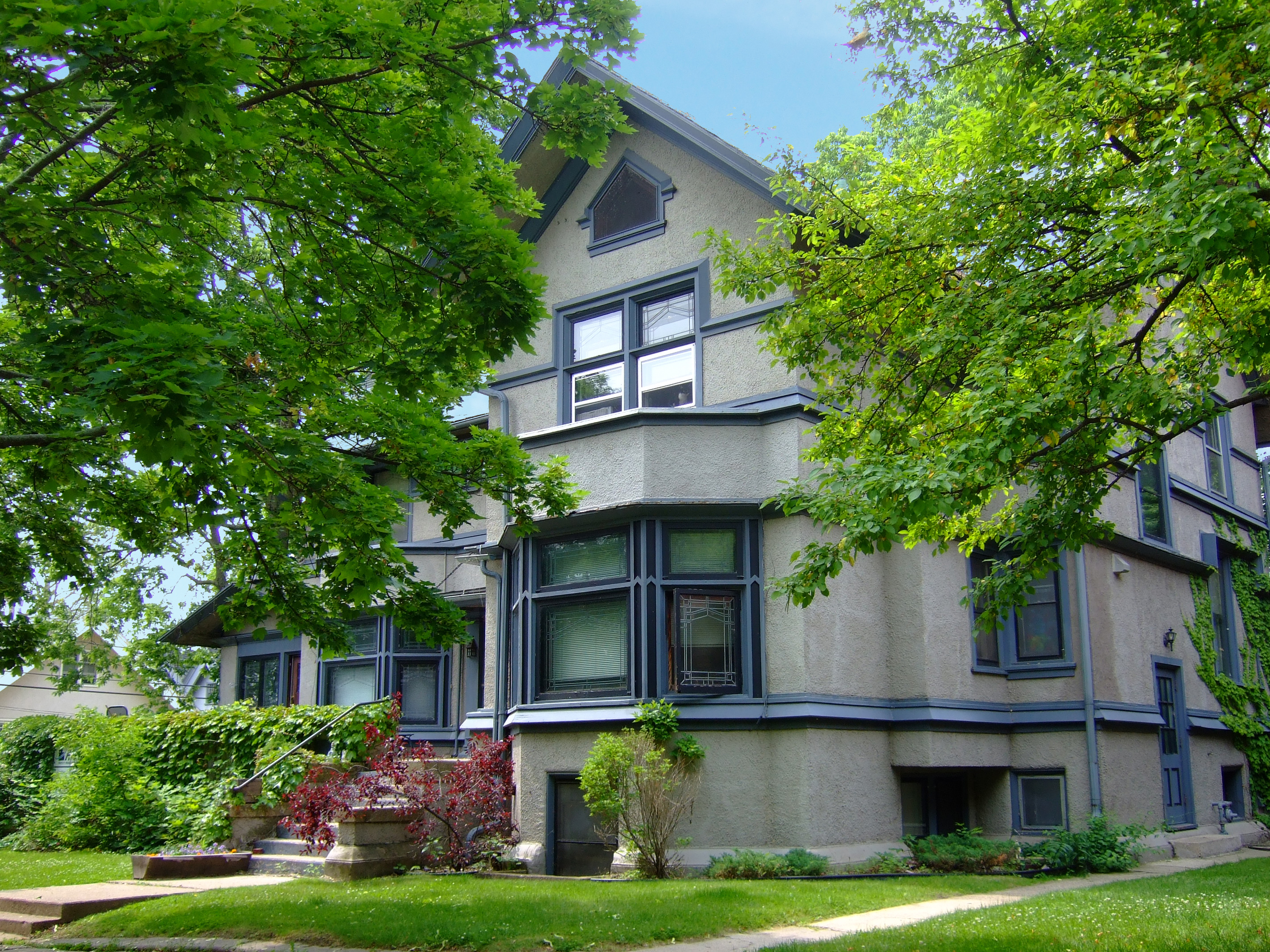
George A. Lougee House

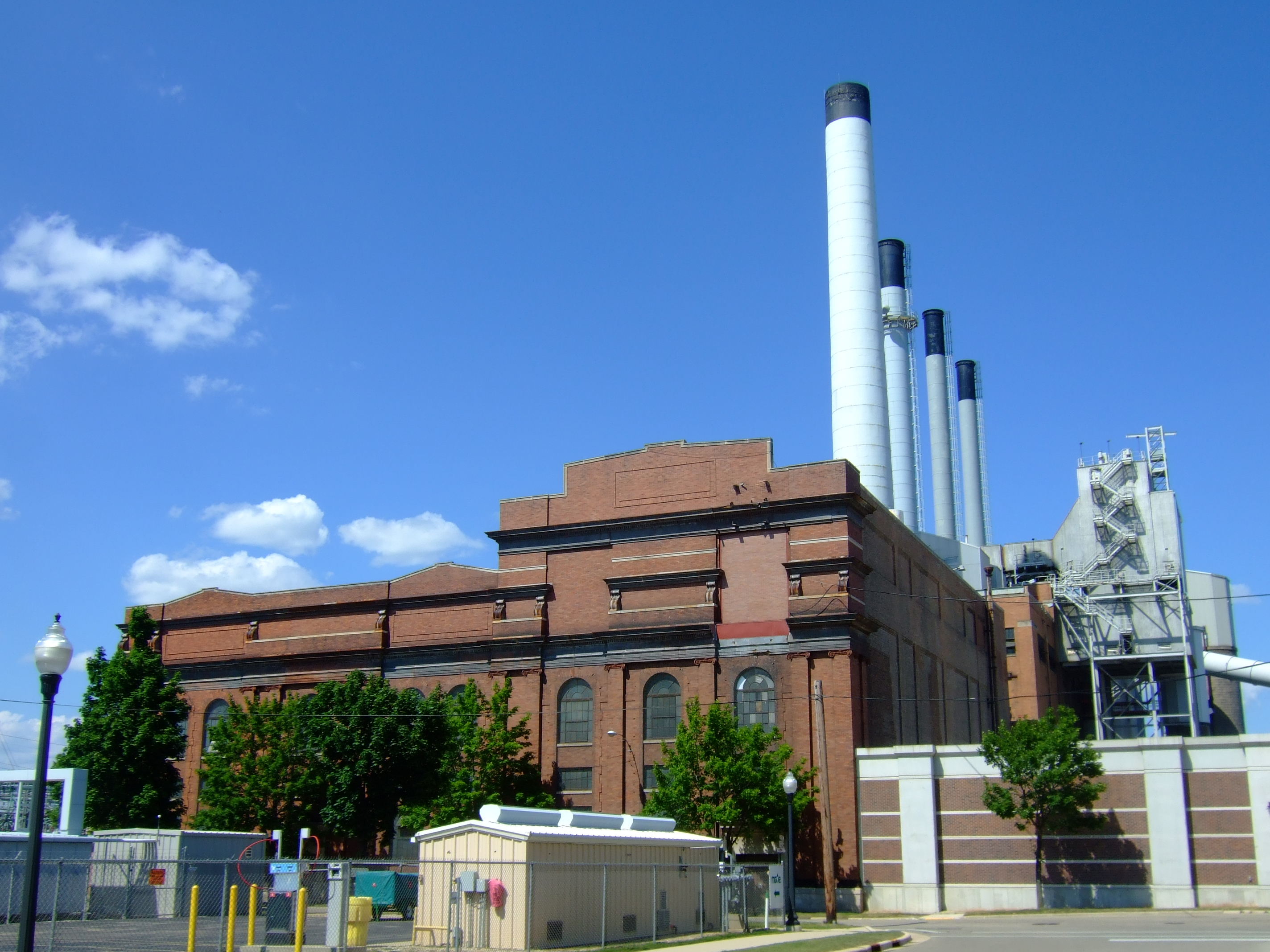
Madison Gas and Electric Company Powerhouse

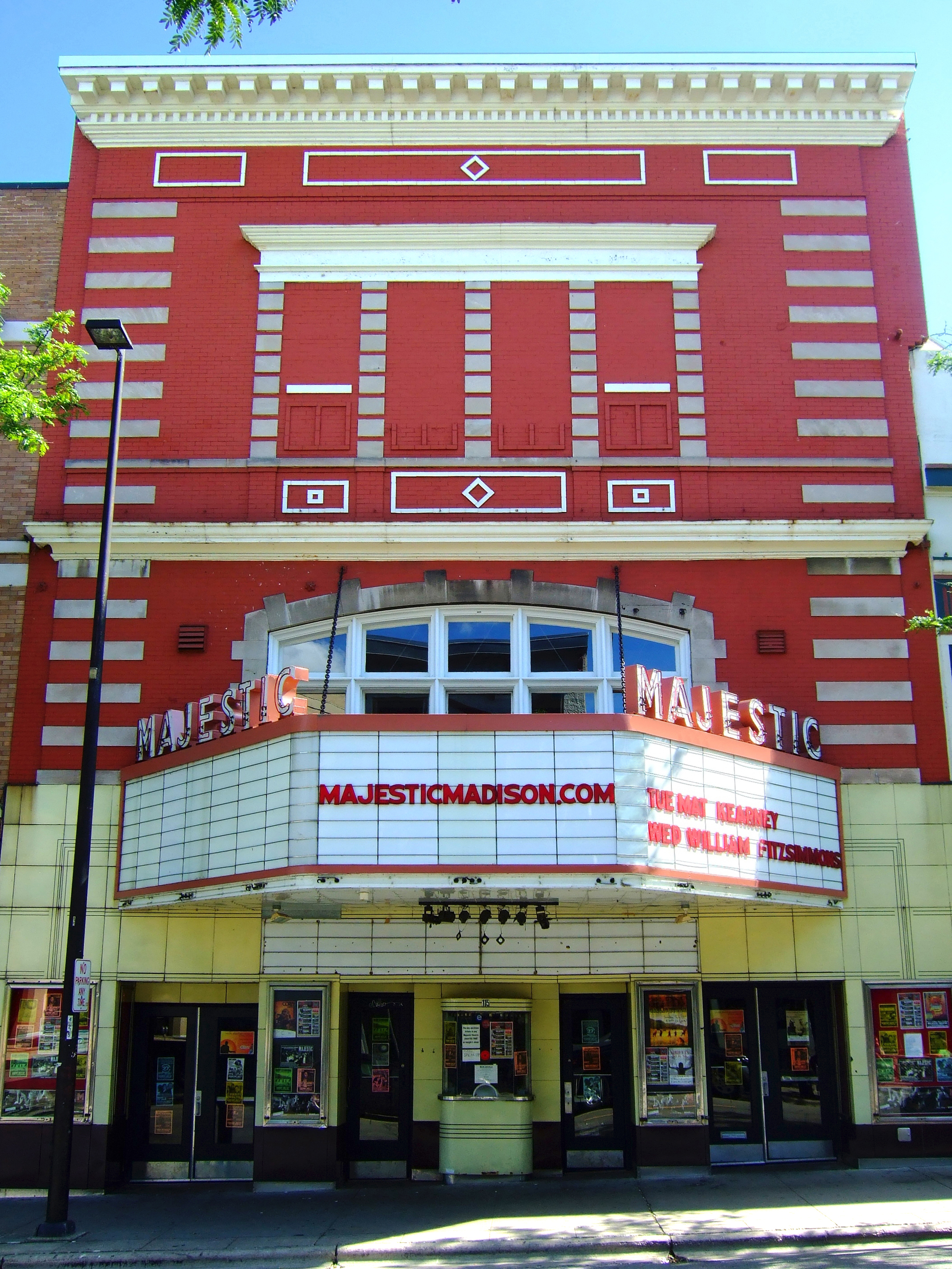
Majestic Theater

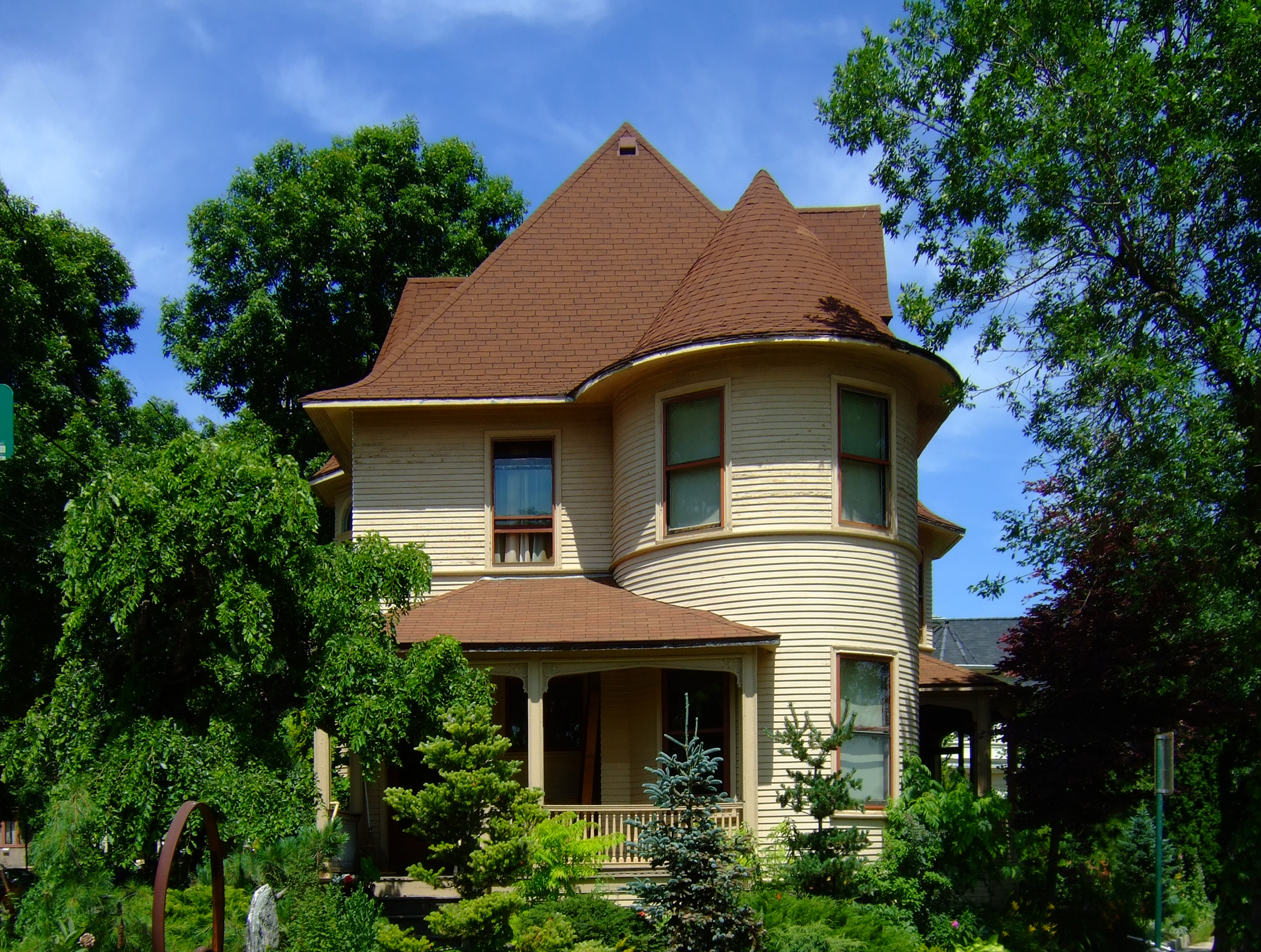
Ott House

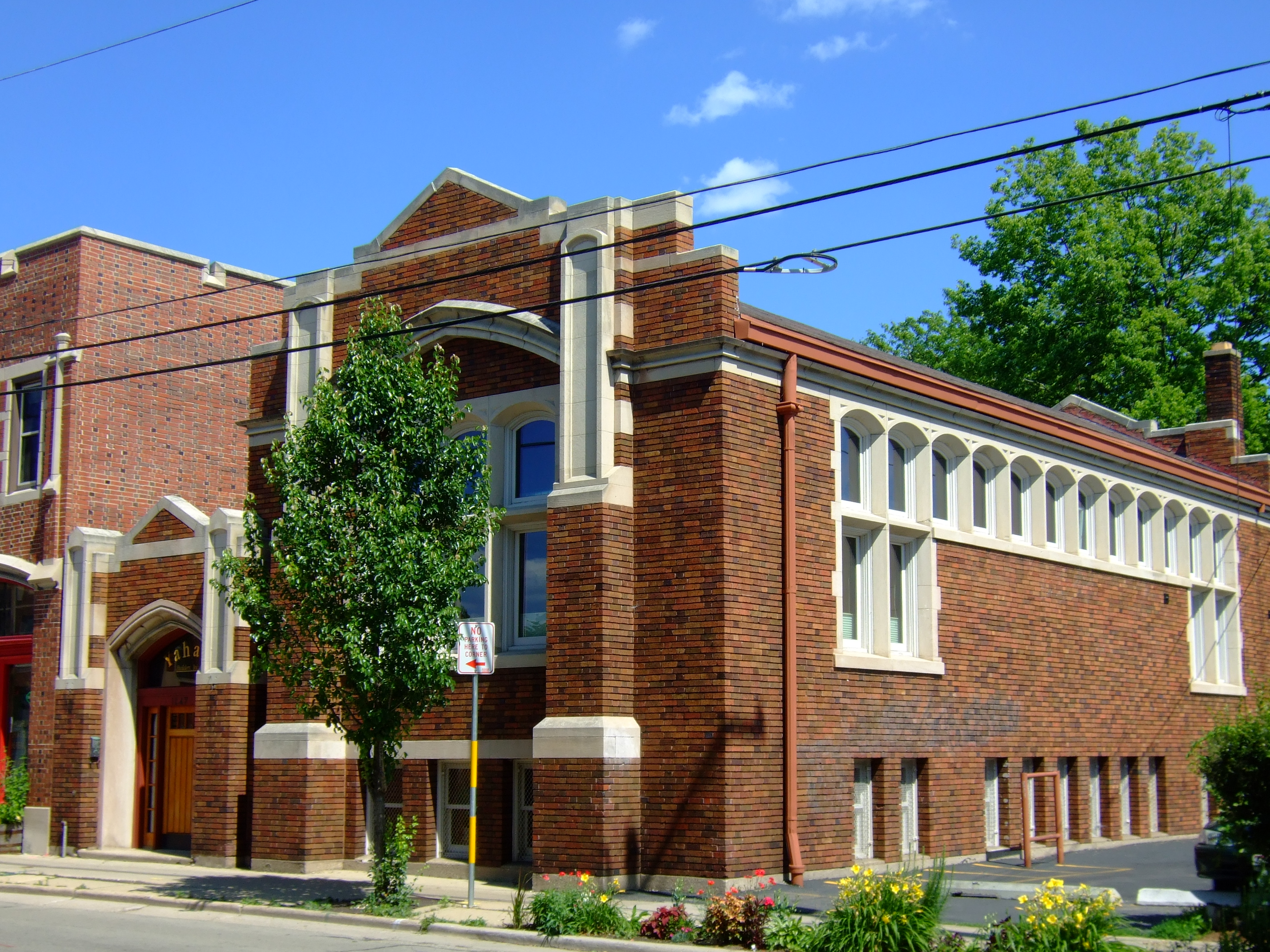
Public Library Branch

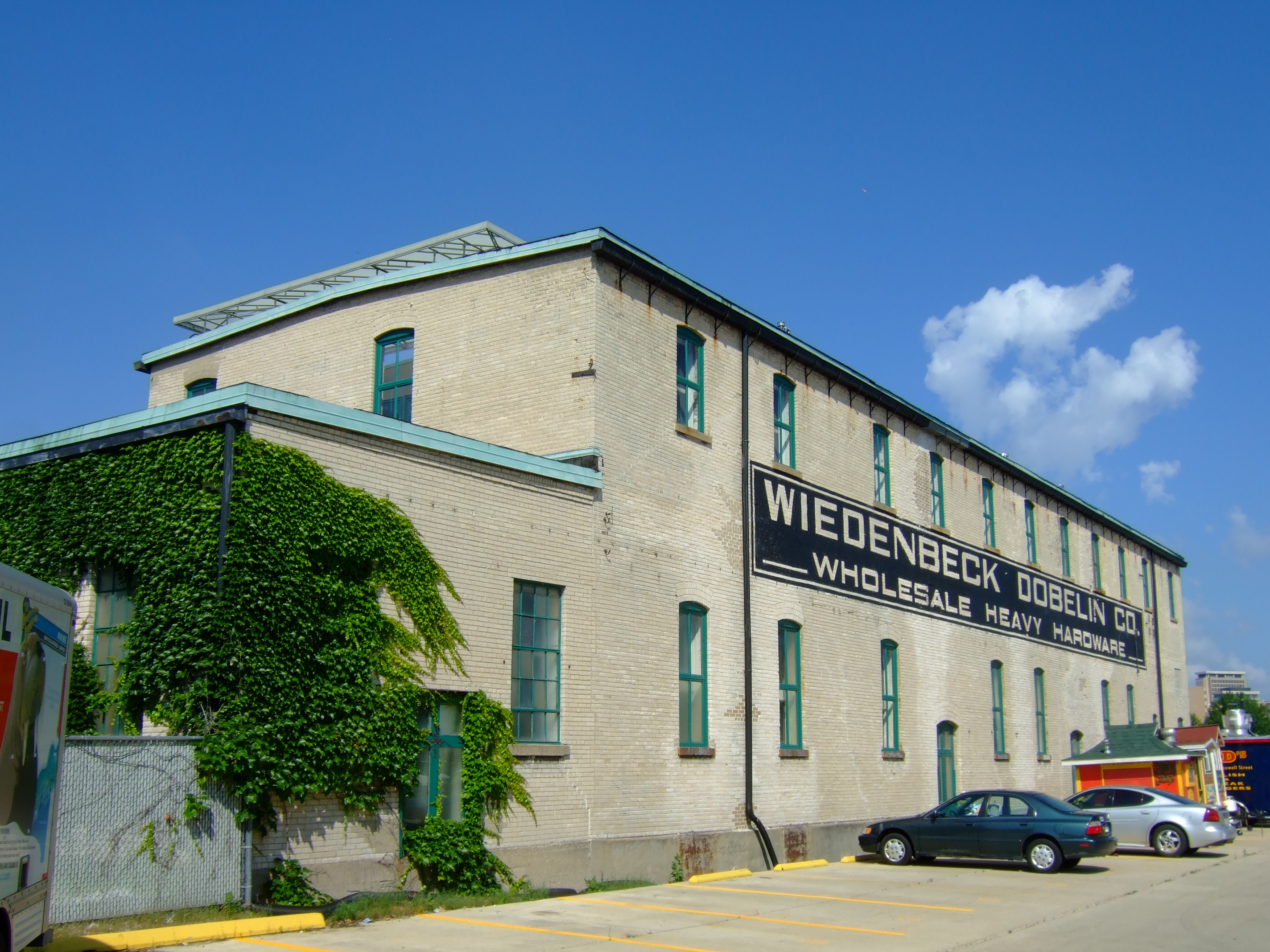
Wiedenbeck-Dobelin Warehouse

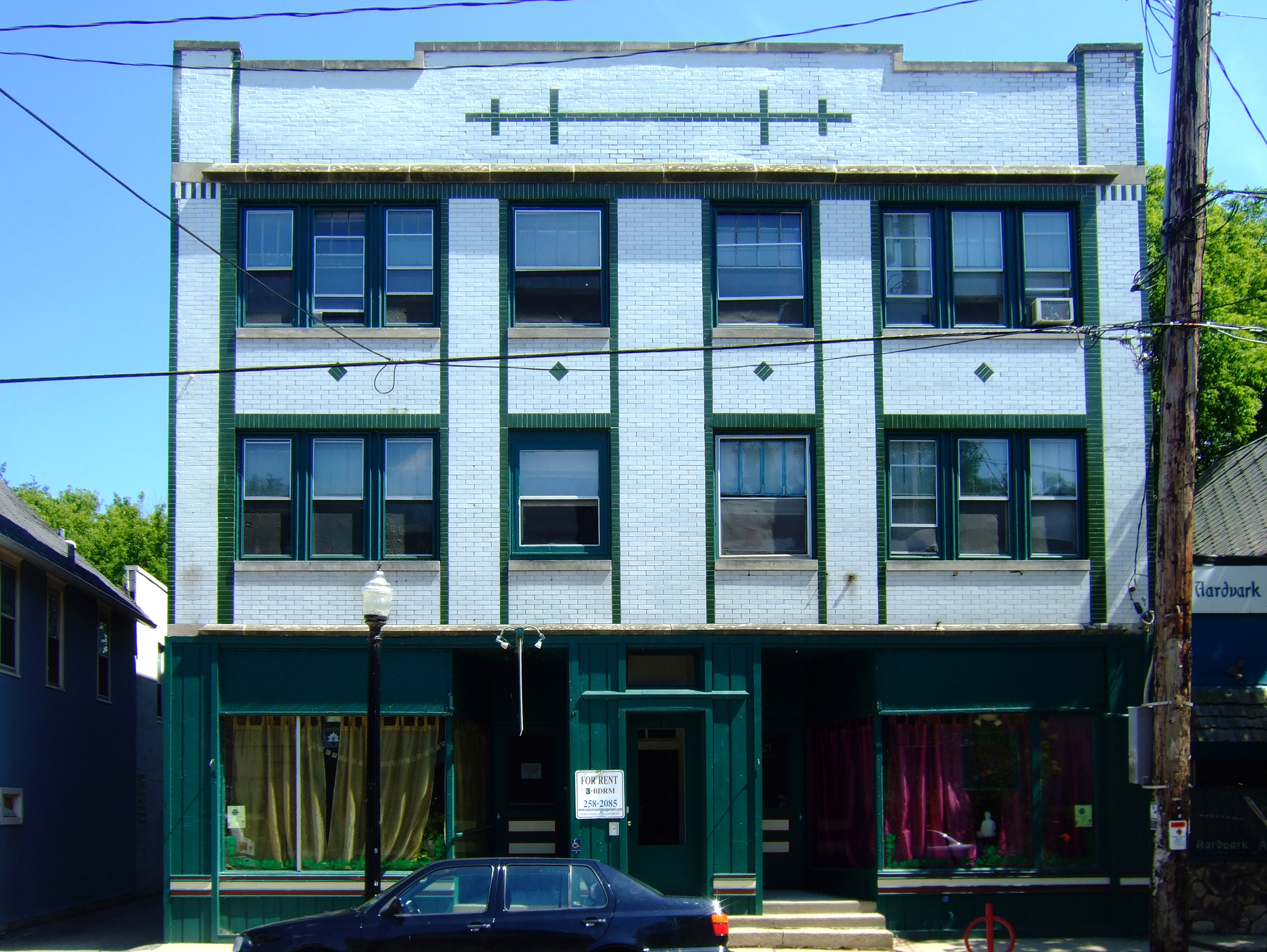
Zimmerman Store and Apartment

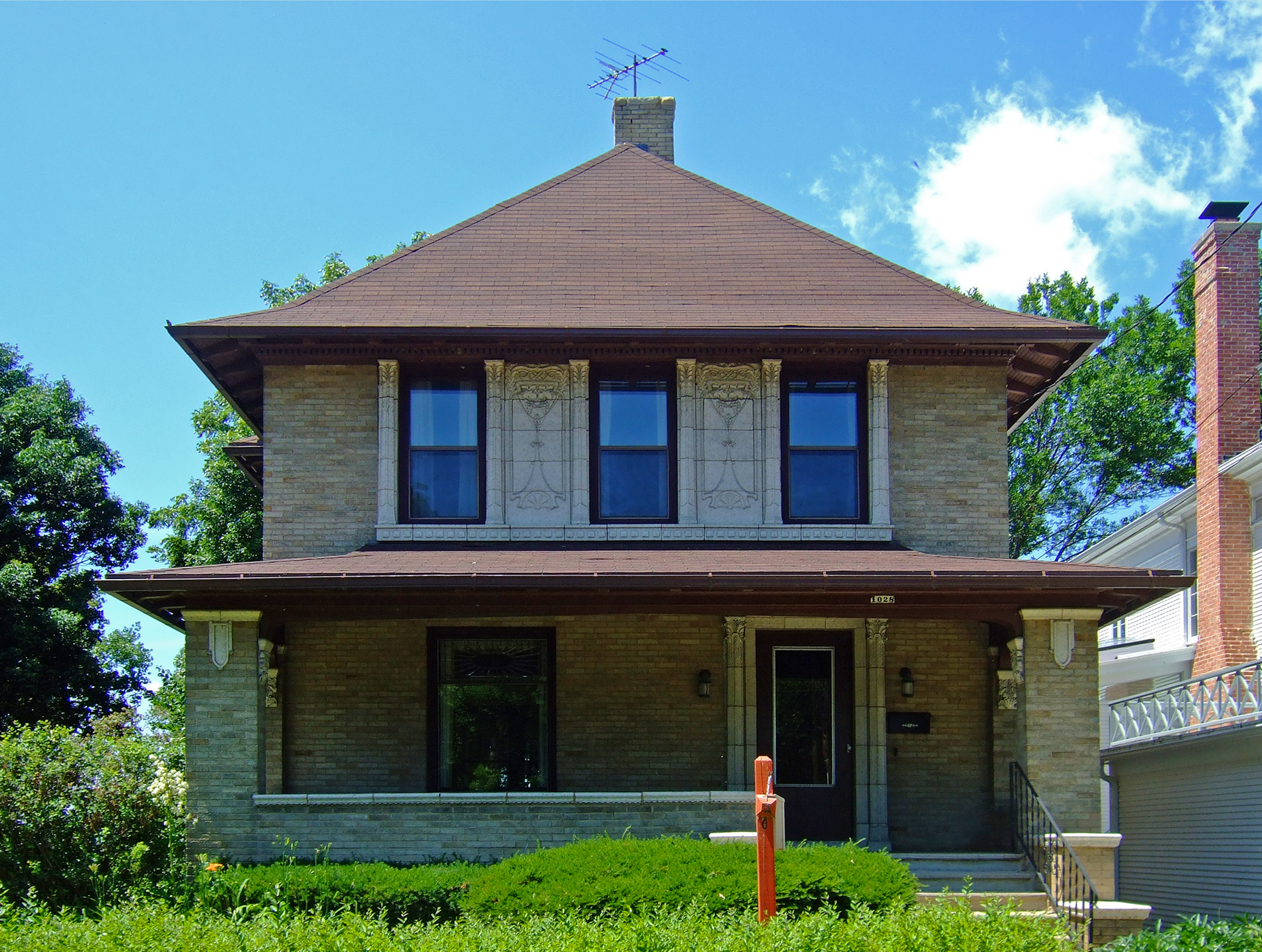
1028 Sherman Avenue

== Buildings elsewhere ==
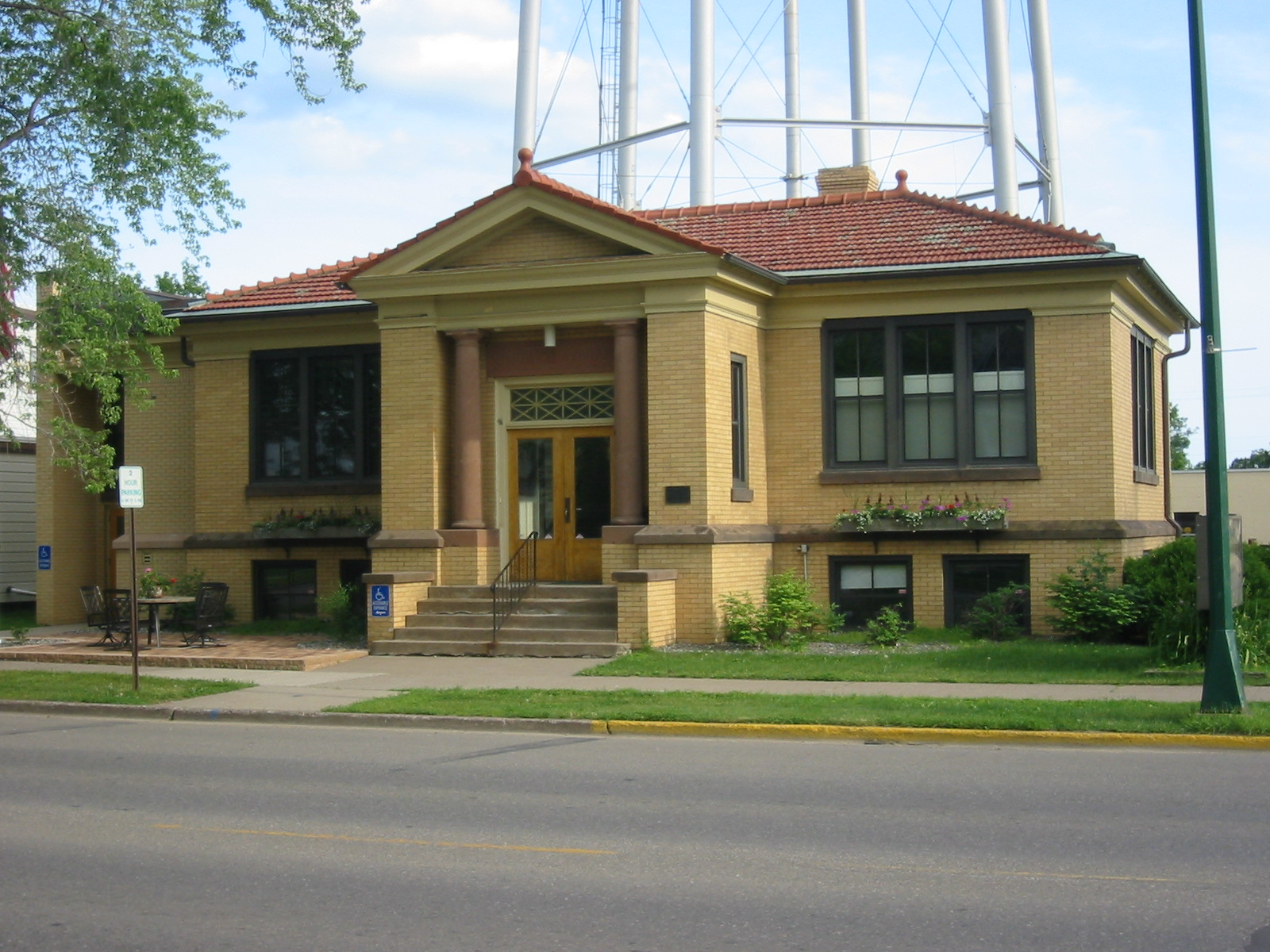
Carnegie Library, Aitkin, Minnesota

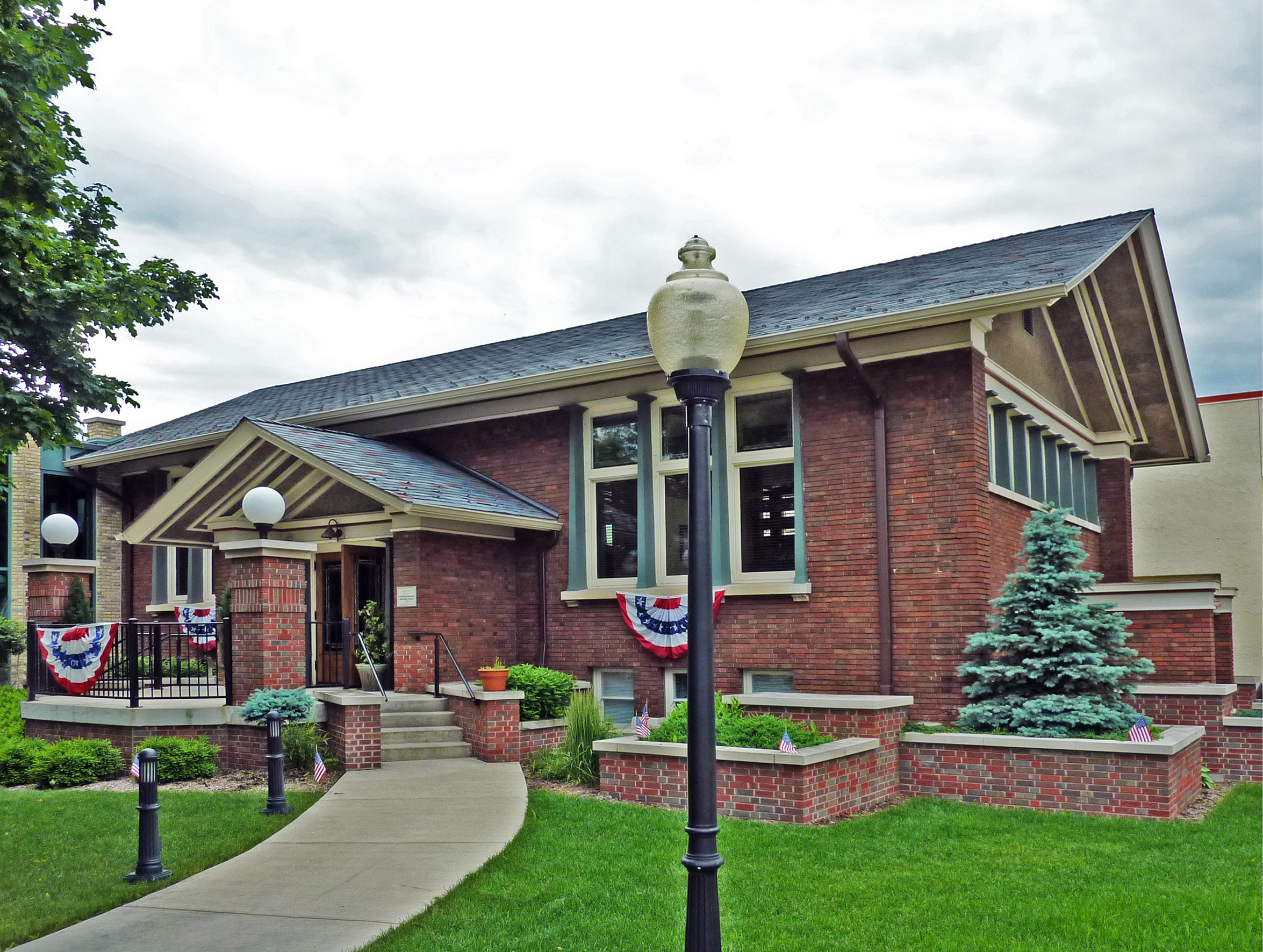
Public Library, Jefferson, Wisconsin

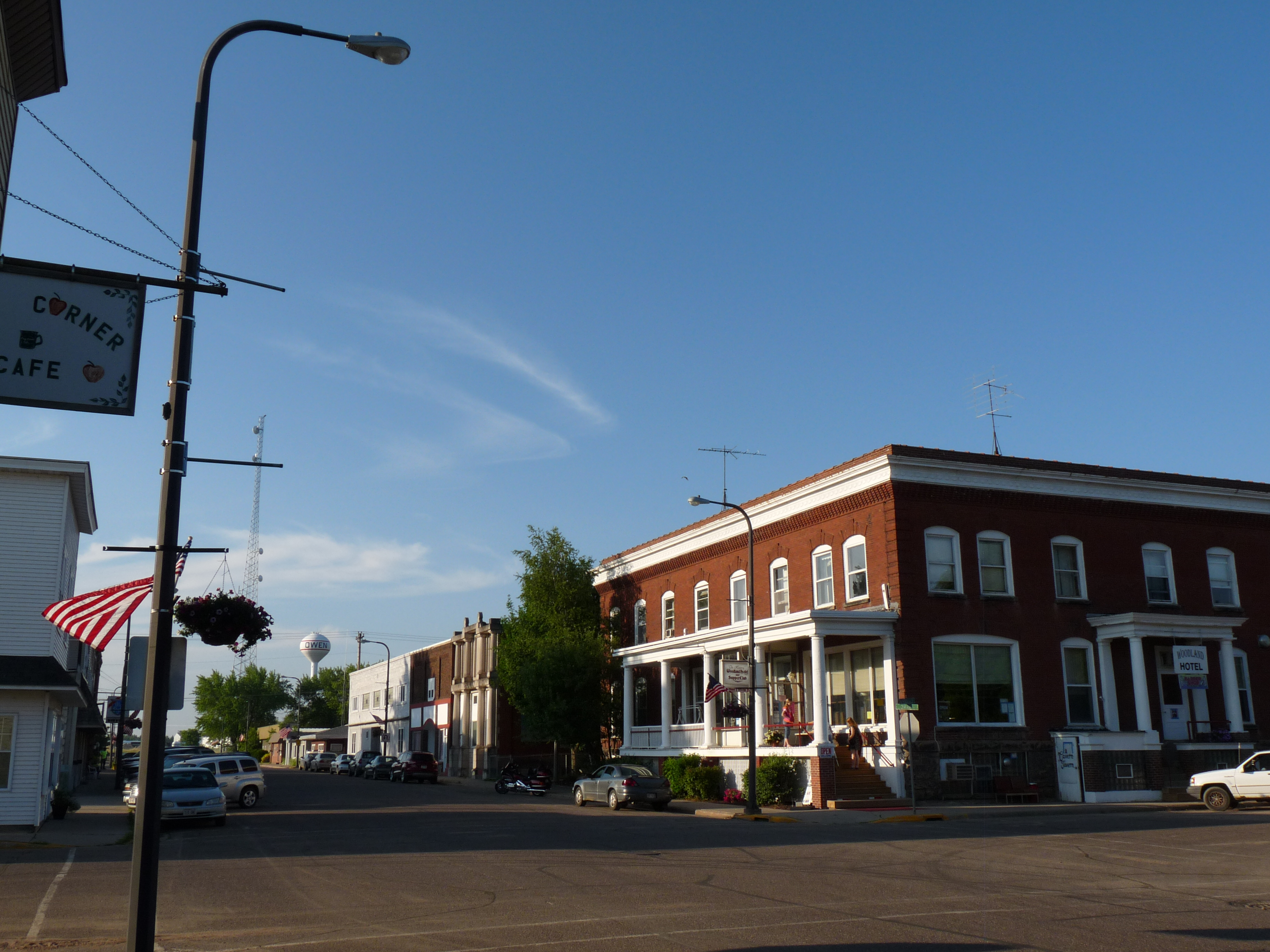
Woodland Hotel, 1906, Owen, Wisconsin

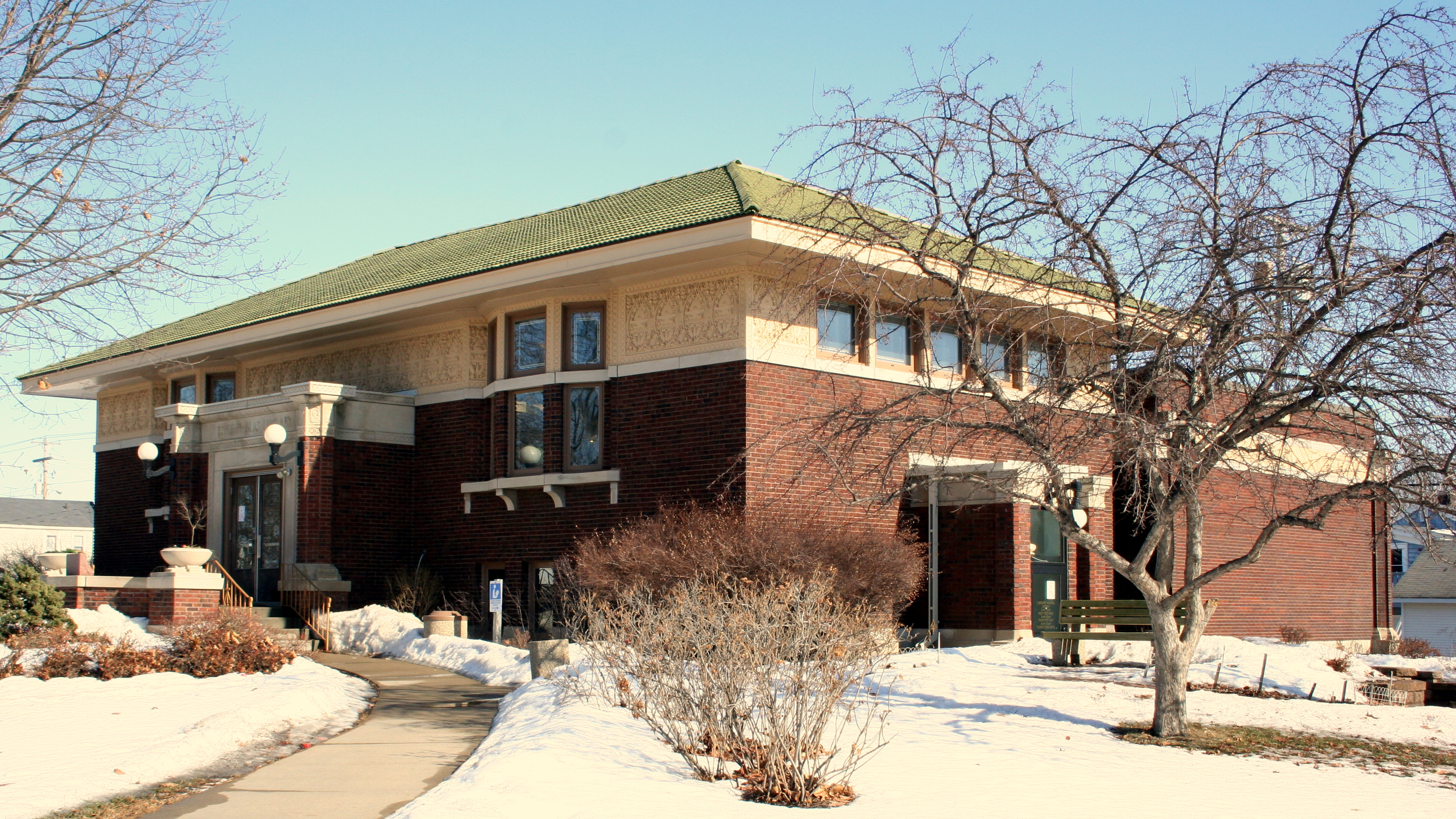
Public Library, Tomah, Wisconsin

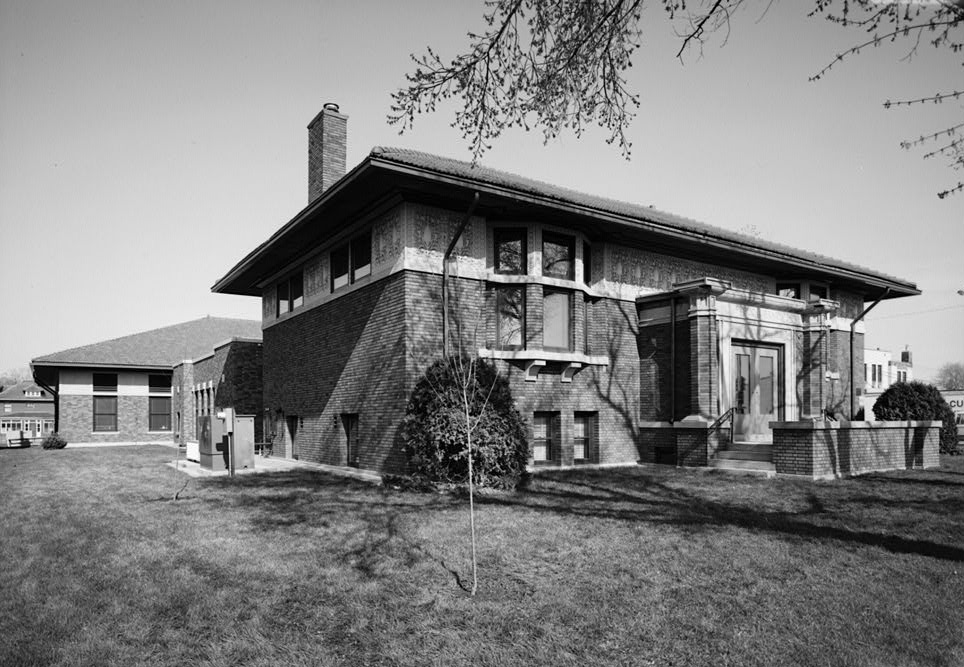
Carnegie Library, Detroit Lakes, Minnesota

Claude and Starck designed approximately 40 libraries, including the "seven sisters" characterized by the Prairie School style.

- Aitkin, Minnesota: Aitkin Carnegie Library, NRHP-listed
- Antigo, Wisconsin: Junior High School
- Argyle, Wisconsin: Argyle High and Grade School (1920)
- Baraboo, Wisconsin: Baraboo Public Library (1903)
- Barron, Wisconsin: public library (1913; one of the "seven sisters")
- Bloomington, Wisconsin: High and Grade School (1923)
- Darlington, Wisconsin: Darlington Carnegie Free Library (1905)
- Delavan, Wisconsin: Aram Public Library on Fourth Street (1907)
- Detroit Lakes, Minnesota: Carnegie Library (1913; listed since 1976 in the National Register of Historic Places)
- Evansville, Wisconsin: public library (1908; perhaps the first of the "seven sisters")
- Fennimore, Wisconsin: Dwight T. Parker Public Library (1923 NRHP-listed)
- Hoquiam, Washington: Carnegie Library (circa 1910; listed since 1982 in the National Register of Historic Places)
- Jefferson, Wisconsin: Jefferson Public Library (listed since 1980 in the National Register of Historic Places)
- Kaukauna, Wisconsin: public library (1905)
- Lancaster, Wisconsin: Municipal Building (1923; listed since 1983 on the NRHP)
- Ladysmith, Wisconsin: Carnegie Library (1907)
- Merrill, Wisconsin: T.B. Scott Free Library (1911; listed since 1974 in the National Register of Historic Places; one of the "seven sisters")
- Mineral Point, Wisconsin: Mineral Point Opera House and municipal building (1915)
- Monroe, Wisconsin: Arabut Ludlow Memorial Free Library (1904)
- Mount Horeb, Wisconsin: Henry L. and Sarah Dahle House (1916, listed on the NRHP since 2003)
- Owen, Wisconsin: Woodland Hotel (1906, for the J. S. Owen Lumber Company). Listed on the Wisconsin Register of Historic Places since 2015, and the National Register of Historic Places since 2016.
- Rochelle, Illinois: public library
- Rock Springs, Wisconsin: Ableman High and Grade School (1923)
- Shawano, Wisconsin: public library (1914; one of the "seven sisters"; now demolished)
- Tomah, Wisconsin: Tomah Public Library (1916; listed since 1976 in the National Register of Historic Places)
- Wilmette, Illinois: public library (1904)
- Wisconsin Dells, Wisconsin: Kilbourn Public Library (1912; listed since 1974 in the National Register of Historic Places)
