= Lamb Building =

- U.S. National Register of Historic Places
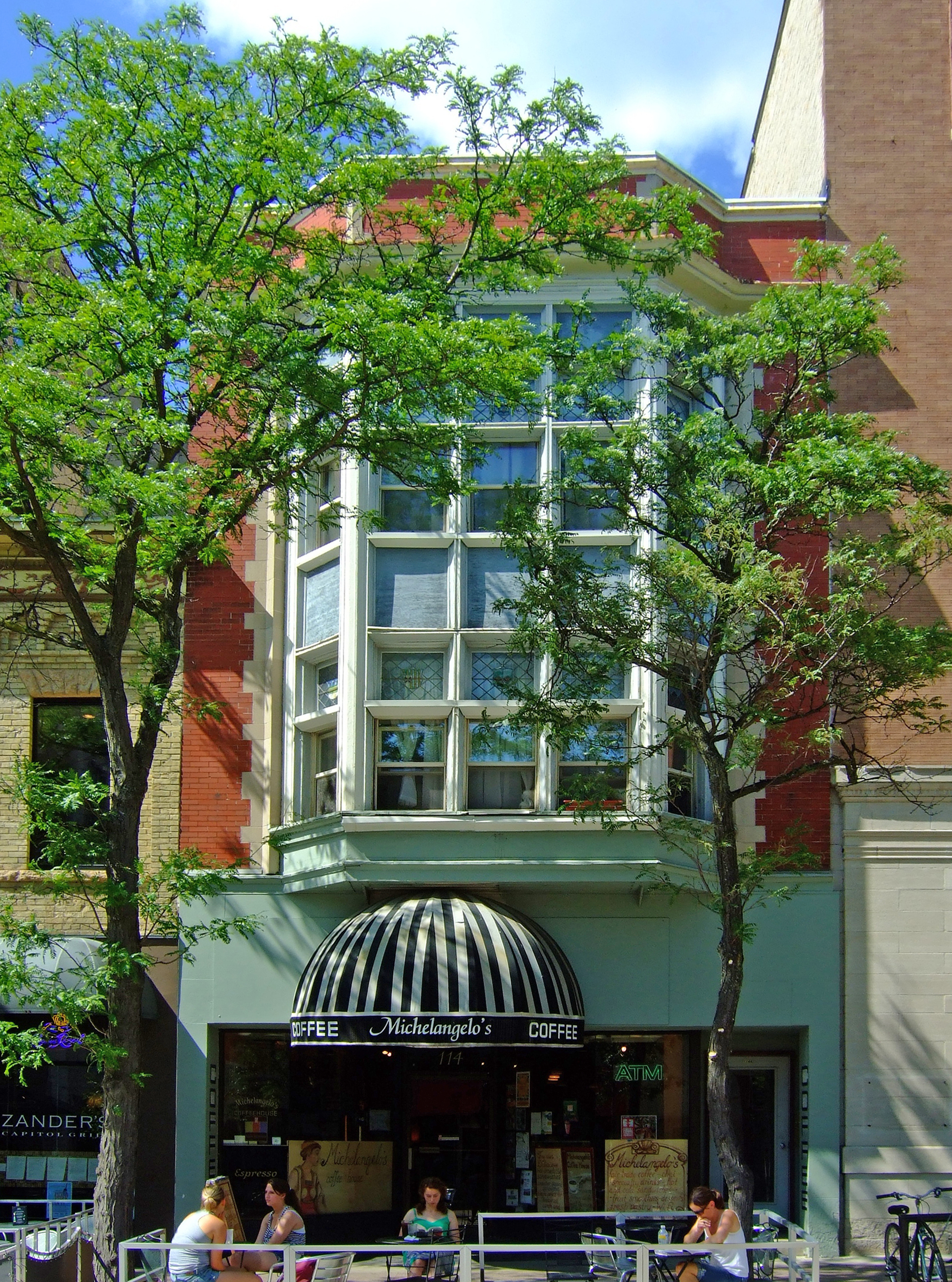
- State Street facade in 2009
- Location: 114 State St. Madison, Wisconsin
- Coordinates: 43.074869°N 89.387234°W
- Built: 1905
- Architect: Claude and Starck
- Architectural style: Queen Anne
- NRHP reference No.: 84003645
- Added to NRHP: August 2, 1984

The Lamb Building is a historic commercial building built a block west of the capitol square in Madison, Wisconsin in 1905. One of the few Queen Anne-style commercial buildings in the city, it was added to the National Register of Historic Places in 1984.

== History ==
The building, which was designed by architecture firm Claude and Starck, was originally constructed for retired attorney F. J. Lamb in 1905. It stands three stories and reaches around the back of the wedge-shaped Commercial State Bank building at the corner of State and Carroll to expose a storefront at 114 State St and another at 114 N Carroll St. The two facades are similar in design. The street-level storefront on State has been changed but the one on Carroll is original. On each facade, a large two-story oriel bay window protrudes from the center. The upper sash of each window is leaded glass in a diamond pattern around a heraldic shield design. The bays are framed by limestone quoins, and those by red brick. The original inside was maple flooring, hardwood trim, and lath and plaster walls and ceilings.

Since construction, the building has been used for a number of commercial purposes. The Commercial State Bank next door used it for a while, and it housed Charles O. Davis' men's clothing store in the 1940s. In 1983, the building was designated a landmark by the Madison Landmarks Commission, and it was added to the NRHP the following year as a good example of Queen Anne style applied to a commercial building, and as one of the "finest remaining buildings in Madison designed by local masters Claude and Starck."

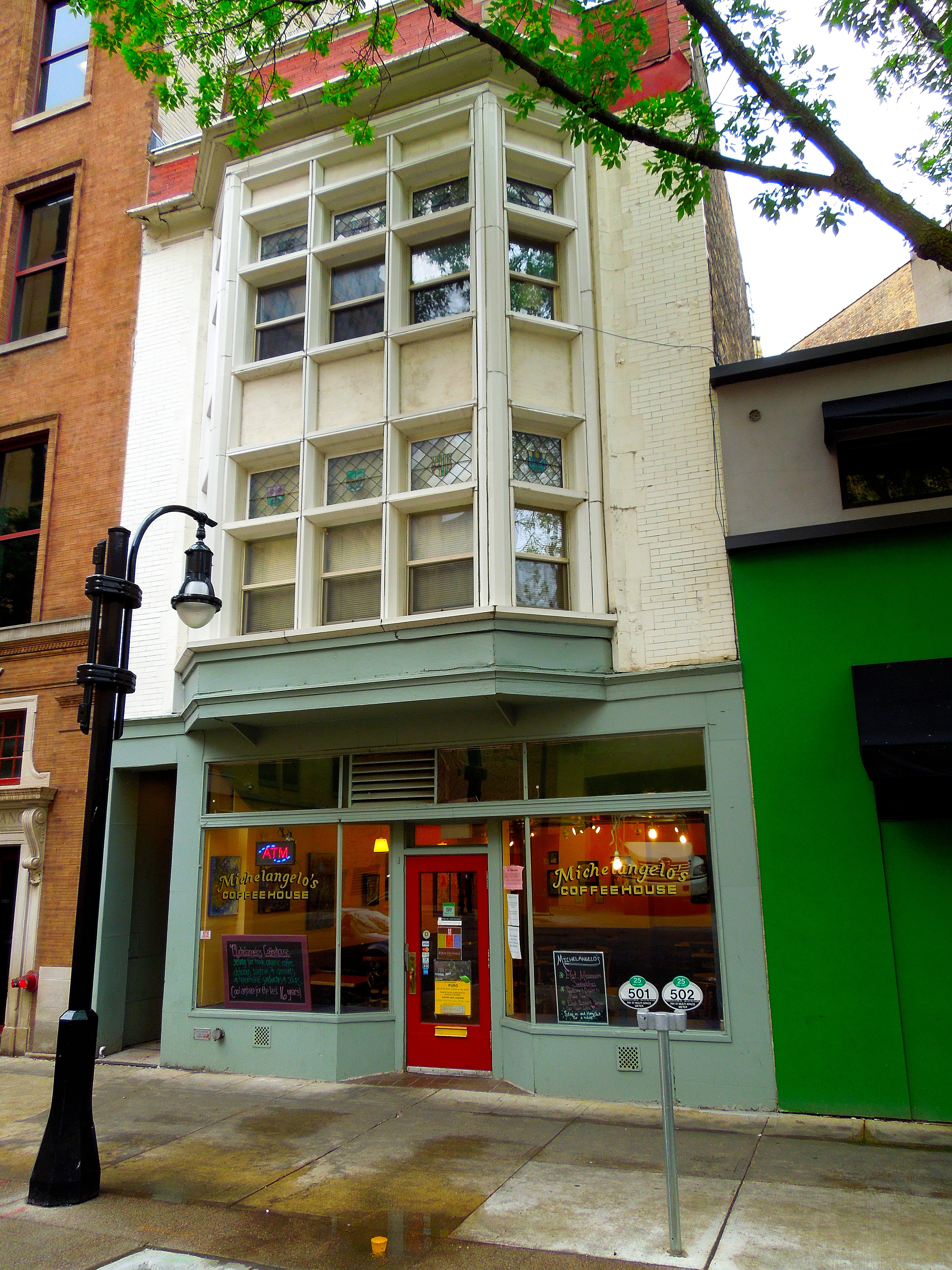
Carroll Street facade in 2013
