= Wiedenbeck-Dobelin Warehouse =

- U.S. National Register of Historic Places
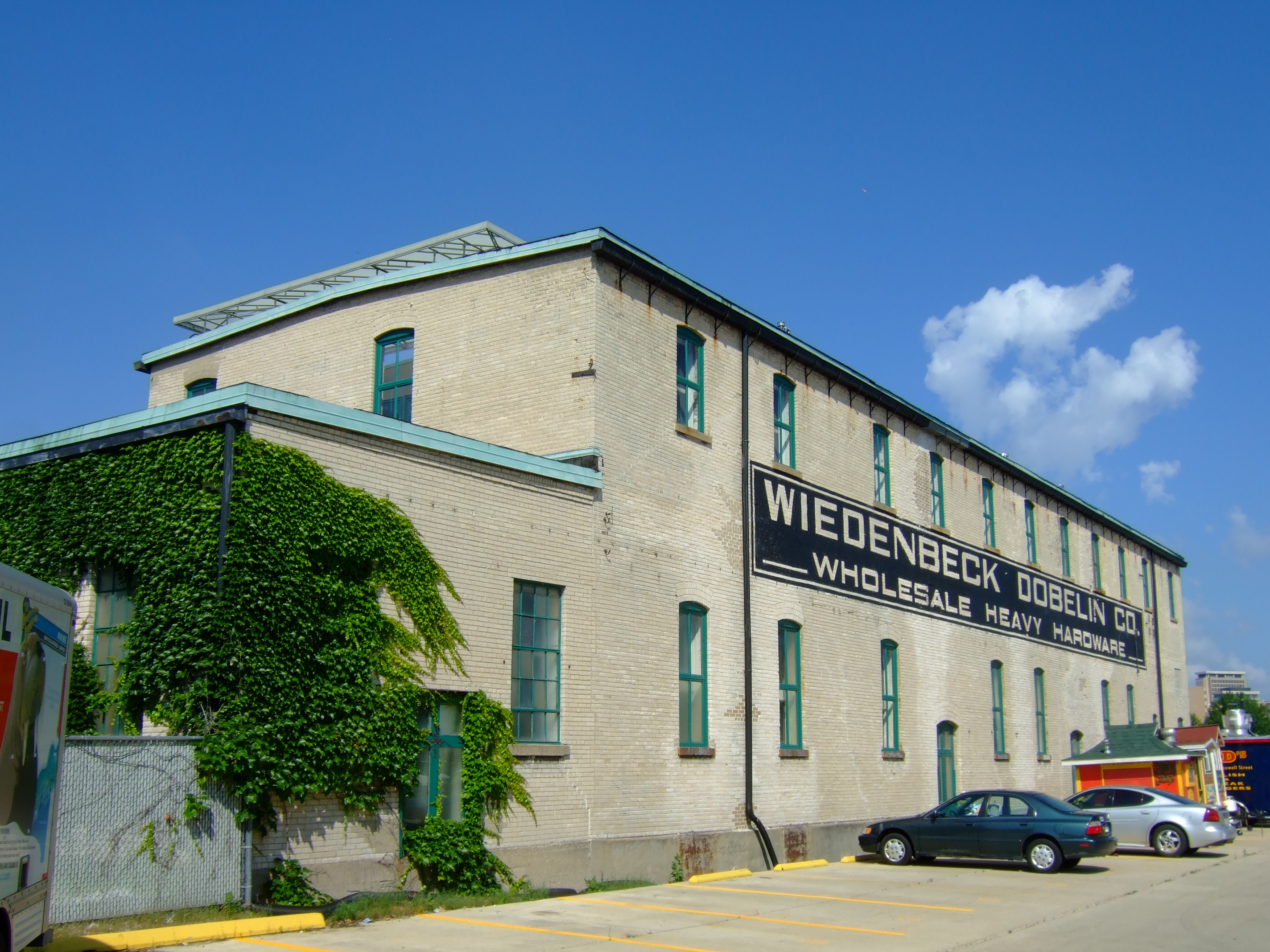
- Wiedenbeck-Dobelin Warehouse
- Location: 619 W. Mifflin St., Madison, Wisconsin
- Coordinates: 43°04′07″N 89°23′40″W
- Area: less than one acre
- Built: 1907/1915
- Architect: Claude and Starck/Law & Law
- NRHP reference No.: 86003473
- Added to NRHP: December 23, 1986

The Wiedenbeck-Dobelin Warehouse is located in Madison, Wisconsin.

== History ==
The warehouse was built for a company that produced hardware for blacksmithing and wagon-building companies. In 1987, it was converted into an apartment building. During the 1990s, the Kohl Center was constructed next to it.

The building was listed on the National Register of Historic Places in 1986 and on the State Register of Historic Places in 1989.
