= Woodland Hotel =

- U.S. National Register of Historic Places
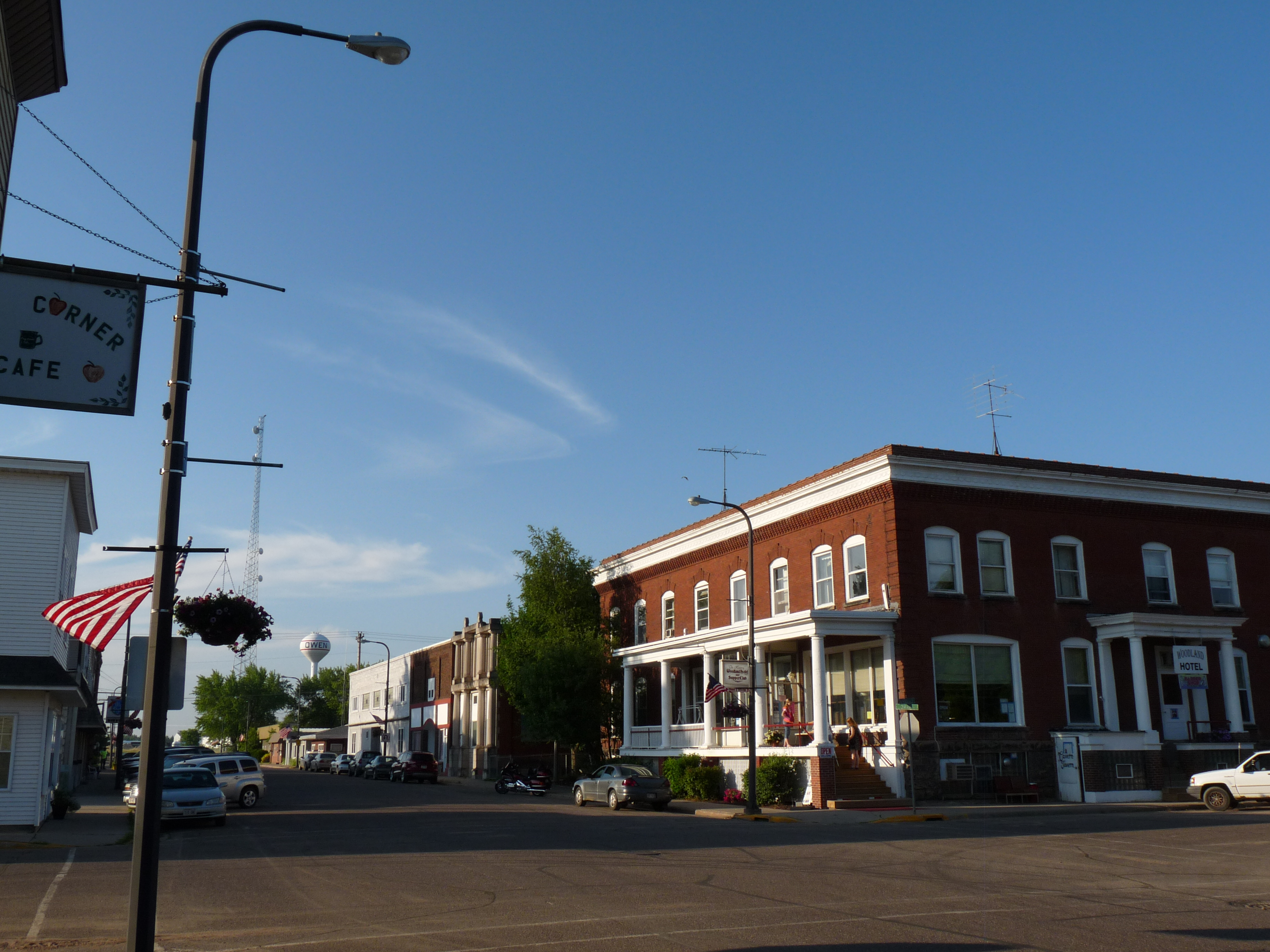
- Downtown Owen, with the Woodland Hotel located on the right.

- Location within Wisconsin Location within the United States
- Location: 207 N. Central Ave. Owen, Wisconsin
- Coordinates: 44.948894°N 90.564402°W
- Built: 1906
- Architect: Claude & Starck
- Architectural style: Neoclassical
- NRHP reference No.: 16000240
- Added to NRHP: May 10, 2016

The Woodland Hotel is located in Owen, Wisconsin. It was added to the National Register of Historic Places in 2016.
