= Wyvetter H. Younge =

American politician (1930–2008)

Member of the Illinois House of Representatives from the 114th district
- In office 1975 – 2008
- Succeeded by: Eddie Lee Jackson

Personal details
- Born: August 23, 1930 St. Louis, Missouri, U.S.
- Died: December 26, 2008 (aged 78)
- Party: Democratic
- Spouse: Richard (deceased)
- Education: Hampton University; Saint Louis University; Washington University in St. Louis
- Profession: Attorney

Wyvetter H. Younge (August 23, 1930 – December 26, 2008) was a Democratic member of the Illinois House of Representatives, representing the 114th District from 1975 until 2008. She served as the Assistant Majority Leader later in her career. Her district included Alorton, Belleville, Brooklyn, Cahokia, Centreville, East St. Louis, Fairview Heights, Mascoutah, Millstadt, O'Fallon, Sauget, Scott Air Force Base, Shiloh, Swansea and Washington Park.

== In the legislature ==
Her committee assignments included: Committee of the Whole; Housing & Urban Development; Approp-Elementary & Secondary Educ; Local Government; Child Support Enforcement; Revenue; Environmental Health (Vice-Chairperson); Subcommittee on Property Tax. She also was a member of the Illinois Legislative Black Caucus.

== Background ==
An attorney with a B.S. from Hampton Institute, a J.D. from Saint Louis University School of Law, and a L.L.M. from Washington University School of Law, Younge was a former Assistant Circuit Attorney for the City of St. Louis. Rep. Younge received the "Best Legislator" award from the UAW in 1993. She was married to Richard G. Younge, also an attorney, and they had three children, Ruth (deceased), Torque, and Margaret, and two step-sons, Richard Younge, Jr., and Roland Younge.

On August 3, 2022, the East St. Louis Higher Education Campus in East St. Louis, Illinois was renamed in Younge's honor, becoming the Wyvetter H. Younge Higher Education Campus. The renaming ceremony was widely attended by higher education officials across the region as well as Margaret Hewitt, Younge's daughter, who spoke at the ceremony.

The Wyvetter Young School of Excellence, located in East St. Louis, Illinois, is also named in Younge's honor.

== Death ==
Younge was hospitalized on December 9, 2008, after suffering from a bleeding artery. She died from surgical complications on December 26, 2008, at age 78 years old. She was replaced by Representative Eddie L. Jackson, also of East St. Louis, who served from 2009 to 2017. The 114th District is now served by Representative LaToya Greenwood.
