= Cahokia (disambiguation) =

Cahokia may refer to:

== Cities ==
- Cahokia, Illinois, a former city
- Cahokia Heights, Illinois, a city in St. Clair County, Illinois
- Cahokia Township, Illinois, a township in Macoupin County, Illinois

== Native American history ==
- Cahokia, or Cahokia Mounds State Historic Site, a UNESCO World Heritage Site in Illinois, U.S.
  - Cahokia Woodhenge, an archeological site near Collinsville, Illinois
- Cahokia people, a former Native American tribe that lived in Illinois

== Schools ==
- Cahokia Unit School District 187 based in Cahokia Heights, Illinois
- Cahokia High School in Cahokia Heights, Illinois

== Other uses ==
- Cahokia Conference, a high school athletic organization in southwestern Illinois
- Cahokia Downs, a defunct horse racing track in St. Clair County, Illinois
- Cahokia Vallis, a geological feature on the planet Mercury
- Kaskaskia–Cahokia Trail, or Cahokia Trail, a road in Illinois, U.S.
- USS Cahokia, a 1944 U.S. Navy tugboat

== See also ==
- Cohoke, Virginia
- Kahoka, Missouri
