= Scott E. Penny =

American politician

Scott E. Penny is a former American chief of police and a politician who served as a Democratic member of the Illinois House of Representatives from November 2011 until January 2013.

== Background ==
Penny received his associate degree in law enforcement form Belleville Area College and his bachelor's degree in criminal justice from McKendree University. He served as an adjunct professor at Southwestern Illinois College. Penny served as police chief for Fairmont City, Illinois and was a business owner.

== Illinois House of Representatives ==
In November 2011, Penny was appointed by local Democratic leaders to the Illinois House of Representatives to succeed Tom Holbrook who chose to resign and take chairmanship of the Illinois Pollution Control Board.

Penny served until January 2013

== Post legislative career ==
On July 1, 2013, Governor Pat Quinn appointed Penny to the Southwest Regional Port District Board for a term expiring for a term expiring June 30, 2016. The Southwest Regional Port District Board governs the port district which includes townships of Canteen, Centreville, East St. Louis, Stites, and Sugar Loaf in St. Clair County, Illinois. Its specific responsibilities include maintenance terminal, and airport facilities and the promotion of industrial, commercial, and recreational development.
