= Stites =

Stites may refer to:

== People ==
- Doctor Stites (fl. 1868), politician in Mississippi
- Gary Stites (born 1940), singer
- Matt Stites (born 1990), baseball player
- Richard Stites (1931–2010), historian
- Tyler Stites (born 1998), cyclist
- Wendy Stites (born 1949), Australian costume designer (also known as Wendy Weir)

== Places ==
- Stites, Idaho
- Stites, Kentucky
- Stites Township, St. Clair County, Illinois

== See also ==
- Stites House, Cincinnati
- Stites & Harbison, law firm
