= Eddie Lee Jackson =

American politician (1949–2020)

Member of the Illinois House of Representatives from the 114th district
- In office January 9, 2009 – January 11, 2017
- Preceded by: Wyvetter H. Younge
- Succeeded by: LaToya Greenwood

Personal details
- Born: July 7, 1949 Canalou, Missouri, U.S.
- Died: December 18, 2020 (aged 71) East St. Louis, Illinois, U.S.
- Party: Democratic
- Education: Southern Illinois University
- Profession: School Principal (retired)

Eddie Lee Jackson (July 7, 1949 – December 18, 2020) was an American politician.

== Career ==
Jackson served as a Democratic member of the Illinois House of Representatives, representing the 114th District from his appointment on January 9, 2009, to replace Wyvetter H. Younge to 2017. The district includes Alorton, Belleville, Brooklyn, Cahokia, Centreville, East St. Louis, Fairview Heights, Mascoutah, Millstadt, O'Fallon, Sauget, Scott Air Force Base, Shiloh, Swansea, and Washington Park.

He was a member of the Illinois House Legislative Black Caucus.

In the 96th General Assembly, Jackson was the vice-chairman of the Illinois House Consumer Protection Committee.

== Death ==
Jackson died from COVID-19 in East St. Louis on December 18, 2020, at the age of 71, during the COVID-19 pandemic in Illinois.
