= LaToya Greenwood =

American politician

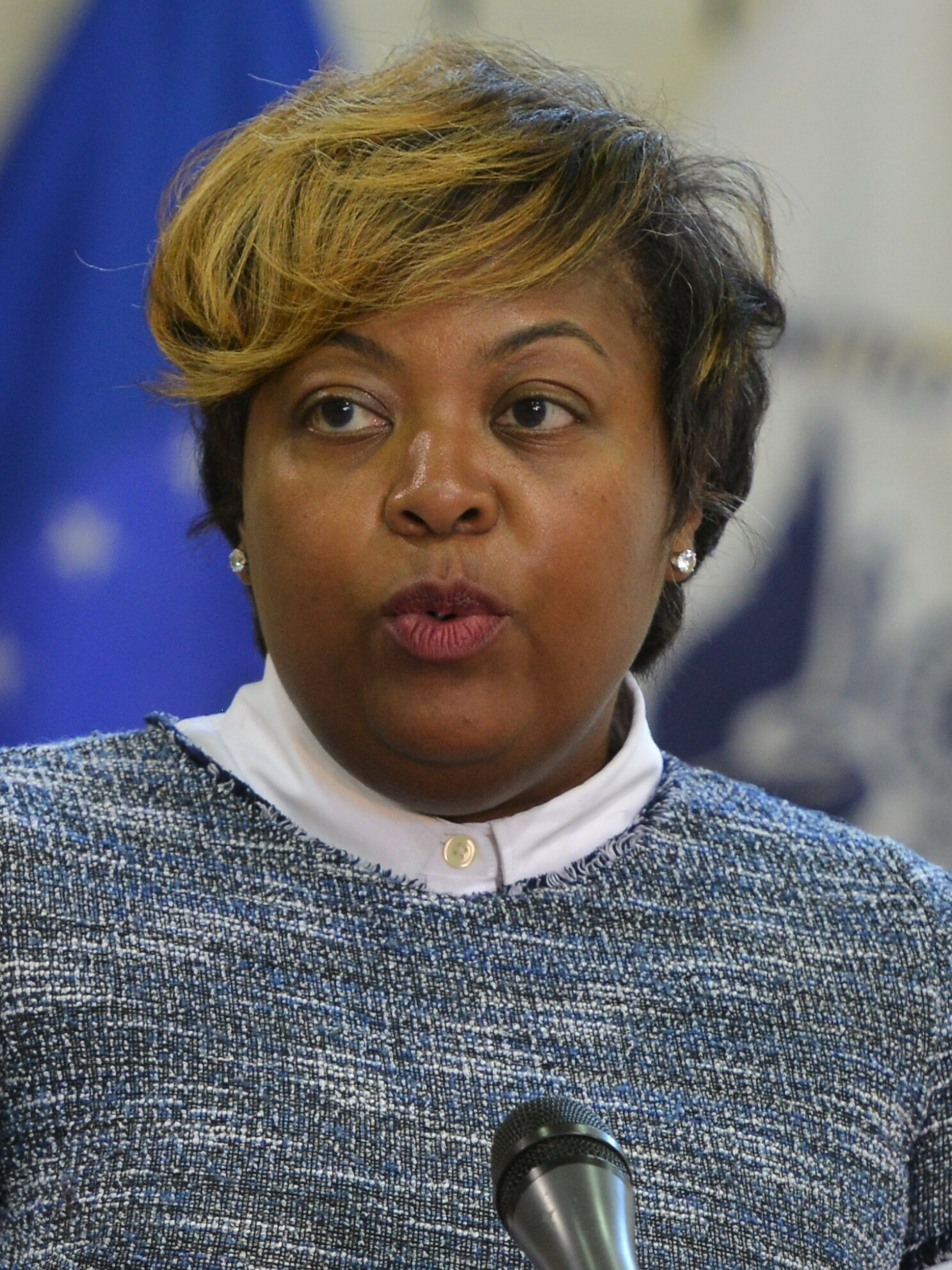

Member of the Illinois House of Representatives from the 114th district
- In office January 10, 2017 – January 11, 2023
- Preceded by: Eddie Lee Jackson
- Succeeded by: Kevin Schmidt

Personal details
- Born: 1973 or 1974 (age 51–52) East St. Louis, Illinois, U.S.
- Party: Democratic
- Children: 1
- Education: Michigan State University (BA); Southern Illinois University (MPA)

LaToya Greenwood is a former Democratic member of the Illinois House of Representatives who represented the 114th district from January 2017 to January 2023. The 114th district includes Belleville, Brooklyn, Cahokia Heights, East St. Louis, Fairview Heights, Mascoutah, Millstadt, O'Fallon, Sauget, Scott Air Force Base, Shiloh, Swansea and Washington Park. Prior to her election to the Illinois House of Representatives, she served as a member of the East St. Louis City Council and Director of Human Resources for East St. Louis School District 189. She has a Bachelor of Arts from Michigan State University and a Master of Public Administration from Southern Illinois University at Edwardsville.

Greenwood was a member of the following Illinois House committees:

- Agriculture & Conservation Committee (HAGC)
- Appropriations - Elementary & Secondary Education Committee (HAPE)
- Appropriations - Human Services Committee (HAPH)
- Citizen Impact Subcommittee (HMAC-CITI)
- Cybersecurity, Data Analytics, & IT Committee (HCDA)
- (Chairwoman of) Health Care Availability & Access Committee (HHCA)
- Labor & Commerce Committee (HLBR)
- Museums, Arts, & Cultural Enhancement Committee (HMAC)
- Prescription Drug Affordability Committee (HPDA)
- Public Utilities Committee (HPUB)
