= East St. Louis School District 189 =

School District in East St. Louis, Illinois, United States

Address
- 1005 State Street East Saint Louis, Illinois, 62201; United States

District information
- Type: Public
- Grades: Pre-kindergarten – 12
- Superintendent: Arthur R. Culver
- NCES District ID: 1713320

Students and staff
- Students: 4,679 (2022–23)
- Faculty: 386.43 (FTE)
- Staff: 593.50 (FTE)
- Student–teacher ratio: 12.11

Other information
- Website: estl189.com

East St. Louis School District 189 is a public school district headquartered in the city of East St. Louis, Illinois, United States.

In addition to East St. Louis, the district also includes portions of Canteen, Centreville, and Stites Townships in northwestern St. Clair County. The district also includes all of Washington Park, much of Alorton and Centreville, and portions of Belleville, Caseyville, Fairmont City, Fairview Heights, and Madison.

== History ==
The non-high school district 202, which included the elementary school districts 182 and 184, was dissolved in July 1956. The area from this district was divided between the East St. Louis school district and the Cahokia Unit School District 187, and therefore the East St. Louis district took students of all grade levels from the former 202 district. The East St. Louis district received around 66% of the students and around 66% of the District 182's assessed valuation. The East St. Louis acquired the three District 182 elementary schools: JMD Brown, Garrison, and LaFayette. The Cahokia district received the remaining students and assessed valuation.

== Schools ==
Schools are located in the city of East St. Louis unless otherwise noted.

=== High school ===
- East St. Louis Senior High School

=== Middle schools ===
- Lincoln Middle School
- Mason-Clark Middle School

=== Elementary schools ===
- Avant Elementary School (Washington Park)
- Bush Elementary School
- Dunbar Elementary School
- Officer Elementary School
- Wright Elementary School

=== Others ===
- Vivian Adams Early Childhood Center
- Wyvetter Younge Alternative Center
- James E. Williams Sr. Learning Center

Washington Elementary

== Former schools ==
- East St. Louis Lincoln High School
- Hawthorne Elementary School
- Rock Junior High School
- Hughes-Quinn Junior High
- Manners Elementary School (Washington Park)
- Neely Elementary School (Alorton)
- Woodrow Wilson Elementary School (Washington Park)
- Nelson Mandela Elementary School (East St. Louis)
- Jackson Math & Science Academy
- Lilly Freeman Elementary School
- King Jr. High School
- Kennedy Elementary
- Bluff View Elementary
- Lansdowne Jr. High School
- Alta Sita Elementary
- Miles Davis Elementary
- Longfellow Elementary

== See also ==
- List of school districts in Illinois
