= National City, Illinois =

Coordinates: 38°38′44″N 90°09′39″W

National City was a suburb of East St. Louis, Illinois. Incorporated in 1907, it was a company town for the St. Louis National Stockyards Company. In 1996, the company, which owned all residential property in the town, evicted all of its residents. The following year, because it had no residents, National City was dissolved by court order. Its site was subsequently annexed by nearby Fairmont City, Illinois.

== History ==
=== Background and context ===
Following the American Civil War, the American economy began to undergo a dramatic change as smaller markets and operations were being replaced by more centralized and efficient ones. This was due in no small part to the advent of the railroads, which by this time crossed much of the country and connected previously isolated producers to one another in a more expedient fashion. This transformation of the nation’s transportation network by railroads had a particularly strong impact on livestock-related industries. It eliminated the need for long cattle drives by connecting the producers of livestock (especially cattle) in the West with the major meat processing companies in the East. It also enabled livestock markets to become transregional, with animals being shipped to large, centralized markets for sale, processing and distribution. The result of this was that over time, smaller, localized markets became obsolete and a relatively small number of terminal livestock markets—markets built near important railroad centers—came to dominate the livestock and meatpacking industries. St. Louis, Missouri was a natural choice as one of these locations.

Situated near the juncture of the Missouri River and Mississippi River, the city of St. Louis had long been an important transportation center. Its access to these river systems coupled with its central location in the country had contributed to its becoming a major industrial center and railroad hub, with all the U.S.’s major rail lines converging in the city and from there running to all the different regions of the country. As railroads became the primary means by which livestock and processed meat was shipped, St. Louis developed into a major livestock and meatpacking center. This was also due to the fact that most of the U.S. population lived east of the Mississippi River prior to 1900, while most of the animals used to produce the meat it consumed were raised west of it, thus making St. Louis a logical place for the interchange between supply and demand in the meat market. However, the Mississippi River provided a hindrance to this movement of livestock and meat to the East at first, because until 1874, when the Eads Bridge was completed, no bridge linking Missouri to Illinois had been constructed. This meant that livestock from the West had to be unloaded in St. Louis, then ferried across the river to East St. Louis, Illinois, where it would then be stocked until it could be taken by railroad to eastern cities. This inefficiency provided additional costs to producers, both in time lost and money spent on ferry fees. It was these problems that caused a group of eastern financiers to invest in the construction of a large stockyard complex outside the already well-established rail center of East St. Louis.

=== The St. Louis National Stockyards Company is formed, 1873 ===
National City had its beginnings as a business investment by East-Coast venture capitalists in the early 1870s. East St. Louis mayor John Bowman had envisioned a new stockyard operation in East. St. Louis that would rival the famous Union Stock Yards in Chicago and make the stockyards in nearby St. Louis minor by comparison, and he approached a group of wealthy investors about establishing it. Most of these investors were railroad men, and virtually all of them were from the East. The man who led this group of investors was Archibald M. Allerton of the New York law firm Allerton, Dutcher and Moore, who also was one of the owners of New York’s National Drove Yard. Allerton and his fellow investors believed such an operation would be a successful venture, but had several conditions they wanted met before they would invest in East St. Louis: 1) they wanted to build their operation on land not incorporated into any existing city, so as to avoid strict regulations, with a promise that East St. Louis would never attempt annexation of their property, 2) they wanted to build their own infrastructure independently of East St. Louis, and 3) they wanted East St. Louis to provide their property with city services such as fire protection. Mayor Bowman acquiesced to these conditions, and the agreement was made official on July 17, 1872, at the East St. Louis city council meeting. The investors had purchased 656 acres (2.65 km^{2}) of land known as Gallagher Pastures (400 acres of which was procured from Mayor Bowman and W.D. Griswold for $145,000, and 256 acres (1.04 km^{2}) from Virginia Matthews for $50,000) on the northeast edge of East St. Louis upon which to build their new stockyard operation, and construction had begun on May 30, 1871. Ultimately, they would spend $1.5 million to construct the complex. It included 100 acres (0.40 km^{2}) of animal pens and 60 acres (240,000 m^{2}) for sheds, as well as the Allerton House (later known as the National Hotel, at which Theodore Roosevelt once stayed)—one of the finest hotels in the area—and a new Exchange Building. On October 31, 1872, the original 17 stockholders who had invested in the new stockyard operation met in Mayor Bowman’s office and elected the first Board of Directors for the operation, with Archibald Allerton as its first President. The St. Louis National Stockyards Company was incorporated in Illinois four days later on November 4 and officially opened for business on November 19, 1873.

=== The early years (1873-1907) ===
==== Consolidation and national prominence ====
Once established, the St. Louis National Stockyards did not take long to become a major player in the livestock and meatpacking industries. The first shipment of cattle had arrived at the complex in June 1873, almost five months before the yards officially opened, and many more shipments would follow. The National Stockyards had been built to accommodate up to 15,000 head of cattle, 10,000 sheep, 20,000 hogs, in addition to a large quantity of non-meat animals such as horses and mules. This large capacity did not go unnoticed by the meatpacking firms in the East, who very shortly after the Stockyards’ inception began to build plants there—which the Stockyards’ board had anticipated by purchasing enough land to accommodate packinghouse operations alongside the yards. The centralization of stockyard operations along railroad terminals had led the major meatpacking companies to follow suit, locating their major operations near the stockyard operations to trim shipping costs connected to transporting whole animals by killing and processing their meat in a single location and shipping only the finished product. The first packinghouse operation to build a plant at the National Stockyards was the White House Provision Company. It was followed soon after by Richardson and Company’s East St. Louis Packing and Provision Company, which opened on November 13, 1873. Richardson’s was able to process 2,000 hogs per day at its beginning, and by the end of 1874 was processing 6,000 per day. Other packing companies began to arrive right on their heels. The St. Louis Beef Canning Company relocated to the Stockyards in 1879, and was followed closely by plants owned by the big-name meatpacking firms. Nelson Morris began operations at the Stockyards in 1889, Gustavus Swift arrived in 1893, and Philip Armour commenced production in 1903. There were also many other smaller firms who built plants near the yards, who along with the big operations helped to make the St. Louis area—and specifically the St. Louis National Stockyards—one of the nation’s premier meatpacking centers, with the Stockyards directly employing 1,200 workers and processing approximately 50,000 animals weekly and boasting sales of more than $2 million each year at the turn of the 20th century.

==== Related industries and infrastructure ====
The centralization of the stockyard and packinghouse operations at the St. Louis National Stockyards also led to the creation and expansion of other related industries at the site. The National Stock Yards National Bank, established with the yards in 1873, became a major financial institution in the St. Louis area, helping to finance the day-to-day operations of the yards. Up until the end of World War II, it would be the largest Illinois bank outside of Chicago. Another major development came as the meatpacking firms began to realize that they could use the vast amount of animal by-products produced by their factories to create new industries—some of which became established at the Stockyards. Other industries related to livestock also became established there, such as seed and feed businesses, companies that dealt in hardware and farm machinery, lumber, and fertilizer, and tanning and rendering plants.

Other services and infrastructure soon followed. The St. Louis Live Stock Exchange was established in 1885 to manage livestock trading at the site, and it did not take long until the Stockyards had a United States Post Office, telegraph offices and the offices of The Daily National Live Stock Reporter, a trade newspaper. The Stockyards had paved roads, which East St. Louis did not have at the time, and its own waterworks that provided cleaner drinking water for the animals there than was available for the people living in downtown St. Louis at the time. It also boasted a system of fire hydrants to protect the operation from catastrophe. In the words of Dr. Andrew Theising, a scholar who has studied East St. Louis and the surrounding area, the St. Louis National Stockyards had quickly become “a world unto itself”, and it would not be long until it became officially a town unto itself.

=== National City, Illinois incorporates, 1907 ===
As the St. Louis National Stockyards and its related industries grew and became established, they returned no small dividends for their investors and provided large profits for both livestock owners and meatpacking firms. However, things quickly became more complicated for the yards. The federal government began to push for food regulations and standards, spurred on by Upton Sinclair’s novel The Jungle, which chronicled the meatpacking industry; the administration of President Theodore Roosevelt had begun to oppose what it called the “beef trust”; and the city of East St. Louis had tried to annex the yards, in violation of the agreement it had made with the company prior to the construction of the complex. In order to counter the increasing intervention of government into its affairs, the St. Louis National Stockyards and its related commercial interests incorporated as National City, Illinois, in July 1907. National City was in all respects a company town, as the St. Louis National Stockyards Company owned all the property in the town. The town consisted of two streets a block long, with about 40 houses arranged in four rows on them, a building that served as a church and school, a police/fire station and a store. The village had a population at its height of 300, all of whom were employees of the stockyards. Everything in the town was under the direct control of the company, from the mayor (handpicked by the company, the town only saw three changes of mayor between 1907 and 1982) to the tax assessments. This control enabled the St. Louis National Stockyards Company to efficiently run its own affairs with minimal outside governmental interference such as taxation and regulation. National City was the first industrial suburb outside East St. Louis, and it would set an example to be followed by other major industries in the St. Louis area, establishing such other company towns on the Illinois side of the Mississippi as Granite City (steel), Alorton (aluminum), Sauget (chemicals) and Wood River and Roxana (oil refinery).

=== From incorporation through World War II (1907-1947) ===
==== Continued growth ====
Following its incorporation as National City, the St. Louis National Stockyards continued to grow as a livestock and meat processing center. World War I in particular expedited this growth. The Stockyards had numerous government contracts, both for supplying meat and providing horses and mules for use as pack animals. By 1920, National City had 14,000 people working there, and the St. Louis National Stockyards had the largest horse and mule market in the world, which would continue until shortly after the end of World War II. In addition, it placed third among American cattle markets and second among hog markets. In 1919, the total money received by the Stockyards was $8,257,798, illustrating the success of the yards during this time. However, World War I and its immediate aftermath would also cause the beginnings of dramatic changes for the Stockyards and its related operations—changes that would ultimately be the beginning of the end for National City.

==== Regulation ====
During the first world war, inflation began to play a major toll on the Stockyards. Yardage fees were 20% higher than they had been before the war, and price levels were 60% higher at the end of the war than they had been in 1914. Exchange members increased their fees charged to livestock producers as well and the producers, feeling they were being cut out of wartime profits by these practices and conditions, appealed to the federal government to regulate the industry.

The federal government responded by passing the Packers and Stockyards Act of 1921. This law gave to the U.S. Department of Agriculture regulatory rights over ownership, trading practices and financial transactions in the stockyard industry. Perhaps most importantly, though, it separated the stockyard and meatpacking industries by forcing the major meatpacking firms to give up their majority interests in stockyard companies. The major business interests in these industries would fight back fiercely against this law’s regulations, to no avail, over the next 20 years. This mandated divorce between the stockyard and meatpacking industries would be the first step toward the decentralization of both industries later in the 20th century—a major factor in the decline of National City. However, another major factor evolving in the market during this period would have an even greater impact on National City and hasten its demise: the truck.

==== From railroad to truck: transportation evolves ====
The first truckload of hogs rolled into National City in 1921. It would not be the last. Over the next two decades, trucks would gain a greater and greater percentage of the volume of animals delivered to the Stockyards, gradually supplanting the formerly powerful and important railroads as the most important mode of shipment for the yards. By 1938, 60% of the livestock shipped to National City came by truck, and by 1952, that number would grow to 99% of hogs and 84% of all other animals. Following World War II, the Stockyards would respond to the evolution of the nation’s transportation network and the increasing mechanization of industry. The yards were converted to handle truck traffic, and the last auctions of work horses and mules took place in 1948, as those animals became obsolete with the increasing ubiquity of farm machinery. This shift from railroad-based shipping to truck-based shipping would threaten the terminal livestock markets across the nation as the livestock and meatpacking industries evolved right alongside the transportation network.

==== Labor issues ====
Another major change that affected National City during the first half of the 20th century was the unionization of packinghouse workers. Originally, the packinghouses—and the Stockyards themselves—had targeted immigrants who would work cheap to man their operations. The “de-skilling” of labor on the assembly lines of the packinghouses meant that workers could be hired with no experience and without even being able to speak English to work for a fraction of what it might cost to pay domestic workers. National City advertised in Europe, soliciting immigrants primarily from Eastern Europe to come to the U.S. to work in the packinghouses. Many thousands arrived in National City and the surrounding area, establishing themselves and making their living in the meatpacking plants. The poor working conditions and low pay of the packinghouses and the rise of unionism during this period, however, ultimately led the packinghouse workers to organize and resist their employers, seeking better wages and working conditions.

Of course, the major meatpacking firms opposed this trend. Apprehensive of a unified, well-organized labor force, meatpackers—like many other industrialists of this period—hired people from many diverse, non-English-speaking ethnic groups in order to hinder the organization of their employees into unions. Another tactic used by the meatpackers was to bring in African-Americans from the South as replacement workers to create tension and discourage unionization and strikes. This latter move played a major role in causing the infamous East St. Louis Race Riots of 1917. However, the packers were not ultimately able to quell the fires of unionization, and by the 1950s virtually all the industries in National City—packinghouses, railroads, etc.—had become union workplaces. This led to increased wages and improved working conditions, including shorter workdays, as well as periodic strikes. These changes in management/labor would eventually play a major role in the packing companies choosing to relocate to the countryside in search of cheaper, nonunion labor.

=== Decline (1947-1997) ===
==== The industry changes ====
The peak year for the National City Stockyards came in 1947, with 1,860,000 cattle—in addition to other animals—being unloaded there. The Stockyards continued to do well through the 1950s. Receipts of cattle vacillated during this decade, but National City competed for first in the nation in hog receipts, eventually surpassing Chicago and Omaha to become the largest hog market in the world in 1954 and earning East St. Louis the epithet “Hog Capital of the Nation”. However, though National City would continue to dominate the hog market for the next decade, its fortunes were changing with the market. The advent of the truck—and later, the interstate highway system—coupled with rising labor costs connected to unionization and the antiquation of outdated factories was causing the meatpacking industry to decentralize and relocate away from centralized terminal markets such as National City to rural areas, where it could find cheaper, nonunion labor, build new factories close to the livestock producers and buy directly from them, thus eliminating the middleman of the stockyard industry and cutting costs.

In 1959, National City placed fourth among major stockyards in the nation. However, as the 1960s began, its gradual decline had begun in earnest. The Armour packinghouse in National City was the first plant owned by a major national firm to close in 1959, laying off 1,400 employees. It would not be the last. By 1986, the last meatpacking plant located in National City had closed its doors, ending an era. As this process of decentralization was underway, the Stockyards themselves continued to gradually diminish in importance to the livestock industry as well. By 1963, National City had slipped to fifth in stockyard production, losing its place atop the hog market in 1967 to Omaha, and it dropped to third place just a year later as St. Paul overtook it. This was evidence not just of National City’s decline, but also that of terminal livestock markets as a whole across the country. In 1970, St. Louis National Stockyards Company President Gilbert Novotny stated that 30% of livestock sold in the U.S. was sold through terminal markets, a dramatic decline from the 90% sales terminal markets boasted in the 1920s. This precipitous decline mirrored the loss of packinghouse operations to the rural countryside. In 1965, the St. Louis Metro-East region, of which National City was a part, had 43 packing plants processing 100,000 animals weekly; by 1970, just five years later, there were 32. In National City, Hunter Packing Company closed its doors in 1980, laying off 1,100 workers; Royal Packing Company followed closely behind in January 1981. They were followed by others, until Swift Independent Packing Company, the last packinghouse located in National City, shut down for good in 1986.

==== The stockyards attempt to adjust ====
The St. Louis National Stockyards Company attempted to reverse its declining fortunes, to no avail. They introduced the first stocker and feeder cattle auctions in October 1960, and they undertook conversion projects aimed at making the yards more truck-friendly, but these efforts to revitalize the Stockyards were ultimately unsuccessful. The industry had changed. Livestock farming in the U.S. had undergone a paradigm shift from a large number of small farmers to a relatively small number of huge corporate farms, where animals could be grown to full-size independently of a centralized stockyard operation. The interstate highway system constructed in the 1950s enabled the major meatpacking firms to bypass the railroads and terminal stockyard operations and purchase their animals directly from the producers, and with the advent of refrigerated trucks, the packing firms could locate their plants near the source of the animals, being able to ship their products anywhere in the country. This also provided them a way to avoid costly labor in unionized major cities, as most countryside labor pools were unorganized. The National City Stockyards were but one victim of this evolution in the market. Across the nation, the major terminal livestock markets were becoming obsolete and shutting down. The Chicago Union Stock Yards, long the industry leader, closed down in 1971; that year, the St. Louis National Stockyards Company was one of only 11 remaining terminal markets in the nation.

As the decline continued, the St. Louis National Stockyards saw many changes. The number of commission houses was cut in half—from 12 to 6—between 1971 and 1990, and the Stockyards went from employing 100 full-time workers to employing just 34. The National Hotel, no longer necessary as shippers made their trips in one day by truck, was shuttered and demolished in 1986. That same year, a fire destroyed the Exchange building—a metaphoric picture of what was happening to the Stockyards themselves at that time. In addition, the industries that the meatpacking industry had spawned at the yards, such as hide processing, rendering, and fertilizer and feed operations, began to leave as well as the meatpacking industry in National City dried up.

=== National City, Illinois Fire & Police Department Fire, 1996 ===
The National City, IL, Village Hall, police and fire station were destroyed by fire on March 22, 1996, at 4:30 A.M. Damage was estimated at over $1 million. It was suspected that a high ranking Police official set the fire in the Police Department to hide evidence that money, guns and other items were taken from the department safe. Since the Police and Fire Department was connected the building was destroyed. He was never arrested and since fled the state.

Fire Chief Charles Schreiber and other firefighters arrived within minutes of the alarm but it was too late to get any apparatus out of the building. Schreiber immediately requested mutual aid from the Brooklyn, East St. Louis, Fairmont City and Caseyville fire departments.

Unable to save the structure, firefighters turned their efforts to a vacant warehouse across the street where embers had ignited the roof. This building was saved. The 60-by-120-foot Village Hall was over 70 years old and originally used as a mule barn. Apparatus destroyed included a 1986 E-One pumper with a 50-foot TeleSqurt, a 1968 American LaFrance pumper, a 1960 American LaFrance pumper and a 1956 Ford pumper.

The East St. Louis and Fairmont City fire departments loaned apparatus and equipment to National City so fire protection could be provided until other apparatus could be purchased. Investigators from the federal Bureau of Alcohol, Tobacco and Firearms (ATF), Illinois State Fire Marshal’s office and National City police and fire departments. The department has since purchased a 1980 Grumman pumper and a 1971 Ward LaFrance pumper with a 50-foot TeleSqurt to replace the destroyed apparatus.

Video of Fire

=== Closing down, 1997 ===
In April 1996, the Saint Louis National Stockyards Company, which owned all of the residential property in National City, ordered the town's approximately 50 remaining residents to leave. The Board of Saint Clair County then requested that the United States Census Bureau conduct a special census of National City, for the purpose of determining whether the town had a sufficient number of residents to avoid dissolution. The Census Bureau conducted the census, and found that the town had no residents. The Board then filed a petition in the county's Circuit Court, requesting an order that the town be dissolved. The Board relied on an Illinois statute that permitted the dissolution of an incorporated community that had fewer than 50 residents according to the most recent federal census. The Circuit Court granted the petition in 1997, and ordered the town dissolved. National City, as well as private citizens who had intervened in the case, appealed the order, but the Illinois Appellate Court affirmed it on October 3, 1997. National City's incorporated existence thus came to end.

Though greatly diminished in importance, the Stockyards would continue to hold hog and cattle auctions until 1997. Due to the dramatic changes in the livestock market and diminished receipts, the company closed down its livestock division by the end of the year.

The town of Fairmont City, Illinois, subsequently annexed the site of National City in 1999.

National City, Illinois, is a testament to the dramatic changes in American industry during the late 19th century and the 20th century. Established as a centralized terminal livestock market, it owed its existence to the railroads, which transformed the livestock and meatpacking industries from spread-out, localized operations to consolidated and integrated major complexes in central urban locations. When the market evolved again in the mid-20th century with the interstate highway system and trucking coming to prominence, the railroads—once king of shipping—began to diminish, and with them the terminal markets as meatpackers were able to bypass the middlemen of the railroad and stockyard companies, leading to the meatpacking and livestock industries once again becoming decentralized. This ultimately led to National City’s demise.

=== Present ===
In the years after its dissolution, National City was essentially a ghost town. There were no residents living there, and much of the land was a post-industrial wasteland, with the remains of dilapidated factories—many overgrown with vegetation and covered in graffiti—standing as empty, crumbling shells, testifying to the onetime greatness of the St. Louis National Stockyards as a national meatpacking and livestock center.

Nevertheless, National City was not completely abandoned. Several industries moved there, including Darling, International, a major rendering company, a recycling plant and Baily International, one of America's largest manufacturers of Asian foods as well as several warehouse, heavy machinery and trucking operations. In addition, as of April 2010, there were several construction projects begun on the property as part of what was called the National City Redevelopment Area. World Wide Technology Raceway is located on the former community.

A further injection of life into the area came with the planning and construction of the Stan Musial Veterans Memorial Bridge, which carries Interstate 70 over the Mississippi River and which opened to traffic in February 2014. The new bridge has its first Illinois exit near the site of National City. This made the site attractive to industry and highly marketable. In the summer of 2012, a new river grain terminal was opened in the area because of its proximity to the future exit. In 2013, local leaders hoped that the bridge would spark further economic development in the area.

=== Traffic Tickets ===
In 1990, National City received attention because of the large number of traffic tickets that its police department issued for moving violations on the one-mile stretch of Illinois Route 3 that bisected the small town. Although the town had only 70 residents at the time, it had a police department with five full-time officers and seven part-time officers. In 1989, the officers issued 5,091 citations for alleged moving violations on Route 3. Most of the citations were for speeding, though some drivers were cited for multiple violations. Payments of the fines for the citations in 1989 brought more than $122,000 of revenue into the town's treasury, amounting to approximately one quarter of the town government's annual budget.

The town's police chief said at the time that drivers were ticketed for speeding only if they exceeded the posted speed limit by at least 10 miles per hour. The town's assistant police chief said that the enforcement program had been started five or six years earlier after residents complained about the number of accidents on Route 3. The assistant police chief also said that the 35 mile per hour speed limit on Route 3 in the town was clearly marked by multiple signs, and that the purpose of the enforcement program was to deter speeding and to prevent people from getting killed.
