= Cedric Harmon =

American activist (born 1966)

Cedric A. Harmon
- Born: 1966 (age 59–60); Centreville, Illinois
- Occupations: Reverend, speaker, writer, and activist

Reverend Cedric A. Harmon (born 1966) is the executive director of Many Voices: A Black Church Movement for LGBT Justice and a speaker, writer, and activist. He is recognized as having taken a "leading role in trying to convince the faithful to support LGBT rights," his work acknowledged in the National Park Service 2016 Centennial report LGBTQ America: A Theme Study of Lesbian, Gay, Bisexual, Transgender, and Queer History. He has also written for outlets such as the Huffington Post and the Advocate.

== Early life ==
Harmon was born and raised as the ninth of nine children in the predominantly African-American rural town of Centreville, Illinois, ten minutes outside St. Louis, Missouri. Prior to his birth, his father raised hogs and chickens. Throughout his youth, Harmon and his family did not have indoor plumbing; they pumped their own water and made use of an outhouse. Though schools were desegregated, Harmon attended what was considered the white school district in the area. There he was placed in a program for academically talented students and became involved in student government and Model United Nations. He eventually attended Cahokia High School. The church was "very much a part" of his upbringing, with his "formal introduction into a religious environment" occurring when he was five years old. At age eight, he "announced a calling to ministry." His family was Baptist, though when he was still young, he and his mother transitioned to a Missionary Baptist church due to his mother's Pentecostal upbringing. He came out as gay in 1994, at age 28. In his work, he began striving to make "historically black churches more welcoming of LGBT parishioners."

== Education ==
Harmon attended Emerson College in Boston, Massachusetts, graduating with a Bachelor's of Science in Media Management. He subsequently attended Wesley Seminary in Washington, D.C.

== Career ==
Harmon began preaching in his church as a child. After attending seminary, he spent 13 years working Americans United for Separation of Church and State as Associate Field Director for Religious Outreach, recruiting and training clergy willing to provide legislative testimony about issues of religion and government to legislative bodies.

In 2008, he began as a volunteer organizer of clergy working to gain marriage equality in Washington, D.C., serving as a steering committee member, simultaneously founding an inclusive church congregation and serving as Associate Pastor. He then co-founded Many Voices with Ann Thompson Cook, taking up the post of Minister of Welcoming Resources, later transitioning to co-director, then executive director.

In 2011, Harmon presented the lecture "Sexuality as a Gift or Problem: Re-educating the Black Church about LGBT Issues" at the Metropolitan Community Church of Corpus Christi's People of African Descent, Friends & Advocates Conference.

In 2012, Harmon was a presenter at the LGBTQ Victory Institute's annual OUT On the Hill conference.

In 2013, Harmon lectured at the University of Maryland on the topic of the Civil War and civil rights with his presentation "Creating a More Perfect Union."

In 2014, Harmon was a presenter for the workshop "Advancing Equitable Outcomes for Black LBGTQ Communities" at the Association of Black Foundation Executives' annual conference. He also joined dozens of faith and government leaders, including then-San Francisco Mayor Gavin Newsom, in petitioning San Francisco Archbishop Cordileone to cancel his appearance at the anti-LGBT extremist National Organization for Marriage’s rally and march. He also became involved with SAGE Story, a national digital storytelling and anti-isolation program for LGBT community elders.

In 2015, Harmon and his Many Voices co-founder Ann Thompson Cook published And God Loves Each One: A Black Church Guide to Sexual Orientation. The same year, he offered testimony before Washington, D.C., City Councilmember Yvette M. Alexander and the Committee on Health and Human Services in support of the Death with Dignity Act of 2015.

In 2016, Harmon was a panelist at Fordham University's LGBTQ panel discussion on race, religion, and sexuality. He was also a panelist at the Portland, Oregon's PFLAG Black Chapter screening of Holler If You Hear Me, a BET documentary about LGBTQ youth who are alienated from their families and churches. In addition, as part of Reconciling Ministries Network, Harmon traveled to Liberia as a trainer for the organization's African Christian Community and Theology Training. There, he led workshops on "human sexuality as it relates to the church and [the] community."

In 2017, Harmon spoke on the panels "Widening Our Circle Among Communities of Color" and "Into the Third Millennium" at the annual Rolling the Stone Away conference, a congress of LGBTQ+ Christian leaders. Also in 2017, he was named as one of "12 Faith Leaders to Watch in 2017" by the Center for American Progress, was selected for an Arcus Leadership Fellowship, and received the Distinguished Service Award from the Gay and Lesbian Activists Alliance of Washington, D.C.

In 2018, Harmon co-led "Bridging Divides," a faith leader social justice training workshop at the Radically Rooted: Summit for Change. He also presented at Souls A' Fire 6, a national conference on black queer theology, and led the workshop "Being in Relationship" at the Wild Goose Festival, a festival of "Spirit, Justice, Music, and Arts." The same year, as part of the Union of Affirming Christians, Harmon and dozens of other members condemned the Trump Administration for dismantling LGBT-friendly policies. Also in 2018, Harmon lectured at the Metropolitan Community Church of Washington, D.C., on "Becoming a Spiritual Force." In March 2018, the Metropolitan Community Church of New York honored Harmon at their Easter Awards Banquet and Celebration.

In 2019, Harmon acted as a trainer at the Unitarian Universalist Association's "Our Whole Lives Matter" facilitator training, a part of their faith leader development workshops.

In 2020 at the University of Redlands Graduate School of Theology's Applied Wisdom Institute, Harmon acted as a seminar facilitator for the Certificate in LGBTQ Leadership program.

== Bibliography ==
=== Books ===
- And God Loves Each One: A Black Church Guide to Sexual Orientation (2015)

=== Articles ===
- "The Truth About Homophobia In The Black Community," Huffington Post (2017)
- "Back To School For LGBTQ Justice," Huffington Post (2016)
- "Historically Black Colleges Need to Help LGBT Students," the Advocate (2016)
- "The Black Church: Bold and Bad Enough To Accept and Affirm," Huffington Post (2015)
- "Supreme Court Marriage Ruling: No Silver Bullet for LGBT Equality," Huffington Post (2015)
- "We, The Black Church, Have a Sex Problem," POZ Magazine (2013)
- "Articles of Faith: Sewing a Quilt of Black Gay and Spiritual Pride," Whosoever (2005)
- "The Black Church: Bold Enough To Affirm LGBTQ People?"

=== As contributor ===
- Building An Inclusive Church (2017)

== Podcasts ==
Date	Show	Episode	Role
2019	Liberation Bible Study	"Hopelessness"	Guest
2019	Ministry in Motion	"Rev. Cedric A. Harmon on Celebrating Black Theology and Human Sexuality"	Guest
2013	Left of Black	"Season 4, Episode 9--ManyVoices: LGBTQ Justice in the Black Church and a 'Killadelphia Memoir’"	Guest

== Awards and recognition ==
- GLAA Distinguished Service Award (2017)
- Metropolitan Community Church of New York honoree (2018)
- Arcus Leadership Fellowship (2017)
- "12 Faith Leaders to Watch in 2017" listee
- "10 Black Religious Leaders Advancing LGBTQ Justice" listee
