= Kevin Schmidt (politician) =

American politician

Member of the Illinois House of Representatives from the 114th district
- Incumbent
- Assumed office January 11, 2023
- Preceded by: LaToya Greenwood
- Succeeded by: George McClellan Jr. (elect)

Personal details
- Born: Belleville, Illinois, U.S.
- Party: Republican
- Spouse: Laura
- Children: 2
- Education: Southern Illinois University Edwardsville
- Profession: Chiropractor
- Committees: Appropriations - Health and Human Services, Appropriations - General Service, Ethics & Elections, Health Care Availability & Access, and Public Health Committees
- Website: https://repschmidt.com/

Kevin Schmidt is an American chiropractor and politician serving as Illinois State Representative for the 114th District. A Republican, he was elected in 2022.

The district is located in Metro East, covering parts of Cahokia Heights, Dupo, Millstadt, Smithton, Freeburg, New Athens, Fayetteville, Mascoutah, Lebanon, and O'Fallon.

Born and raised in Belleville, Schmidt attended Southern Illinois University Edwardsville and Logan College. In 2006, he opened his chiropractic office.

== Illinois House of Representatives ==
In 2025, Shmidt opposed a bill HB 3527 that would ban "discriminatory disability mascots", such as midget, that would only affect Freeburg High School in his district. "You don’t understand the community, you don’t understand the history. It’s our culture."

=== Elections ===
Schmidt first ran in the 116th District in 2020. He came in second place in a three-person Republican primary, losing to David Friess with 31.3% of the vote. Friess went on to win the general election with 64.8% of the vote.

After redistricting in 2022, Schmidt ran in the 114th District and defeated Kevin Dawson in the Republican Primary with 61.2% of the vote. He defeated incumbent Democrat LaToya Greenwood in the general election with 52.8% of the vote.

In announcing his candidacy in 2022, Schmidt criticized Democratic tax policy and climate policy,COVID-19 lockdowns, and listed jobs and crime as campaign priorities.

=== Committees ===
Schmidt took office on January 11, 2023. He sits on the Appropriations - Health and Human Services, Appropriations - General Service, Ethics & Elections, Health Care Availability & Access, and Public Health Committees.

== Personal life ==
Schmidt and his wife Laura have two children. They live in Millstadt.

== Electoral history ==
=== 2022 ===
2022 Illinois House of Representatives 114th district Republican primary
Party	Candidate	Votes	%
Republican	Kevin Schmidt	3,848	61.23%
Republican	Kevin Dawson	2,436	38.77%
Total votes		6,284	100.00%

2022 Illinois House of Representatives 114th district general election
Party	Candidate	Votes	%
Republican	Kevin Schmidt	19,233	52.82%
Democratic	LaToya Greenwood (incumbent)	17,177	47.18%
Total votes		36,410	100.00%
Republican gain from Democratic			

=== 2024 ===
2024 Illinois House of Representatives 114st district Republican primary
Party	Candidate	Votes	%
Republican	Kevin Schmidt (incumbent)	4,132	100.00%

2024 Illinois House of Representatives 114th district general election
Party	Candidate	Votes	%
Republican	Kevin Schmidt	25,057	52.24%
Democratic	LaToya Greenwood (incumbent)	22,911	47.76%
Total votes		47,968	100.00%
Republican hold			

=== 2026 ===
2026 Illinois House of Representatives 114st district Republican primary
Party	Candidate	Votes	%
Republican	Kevin Schmidt (incumbent)	4,430	100.00%
