= Terron Armstead =

American football player (born 1991)

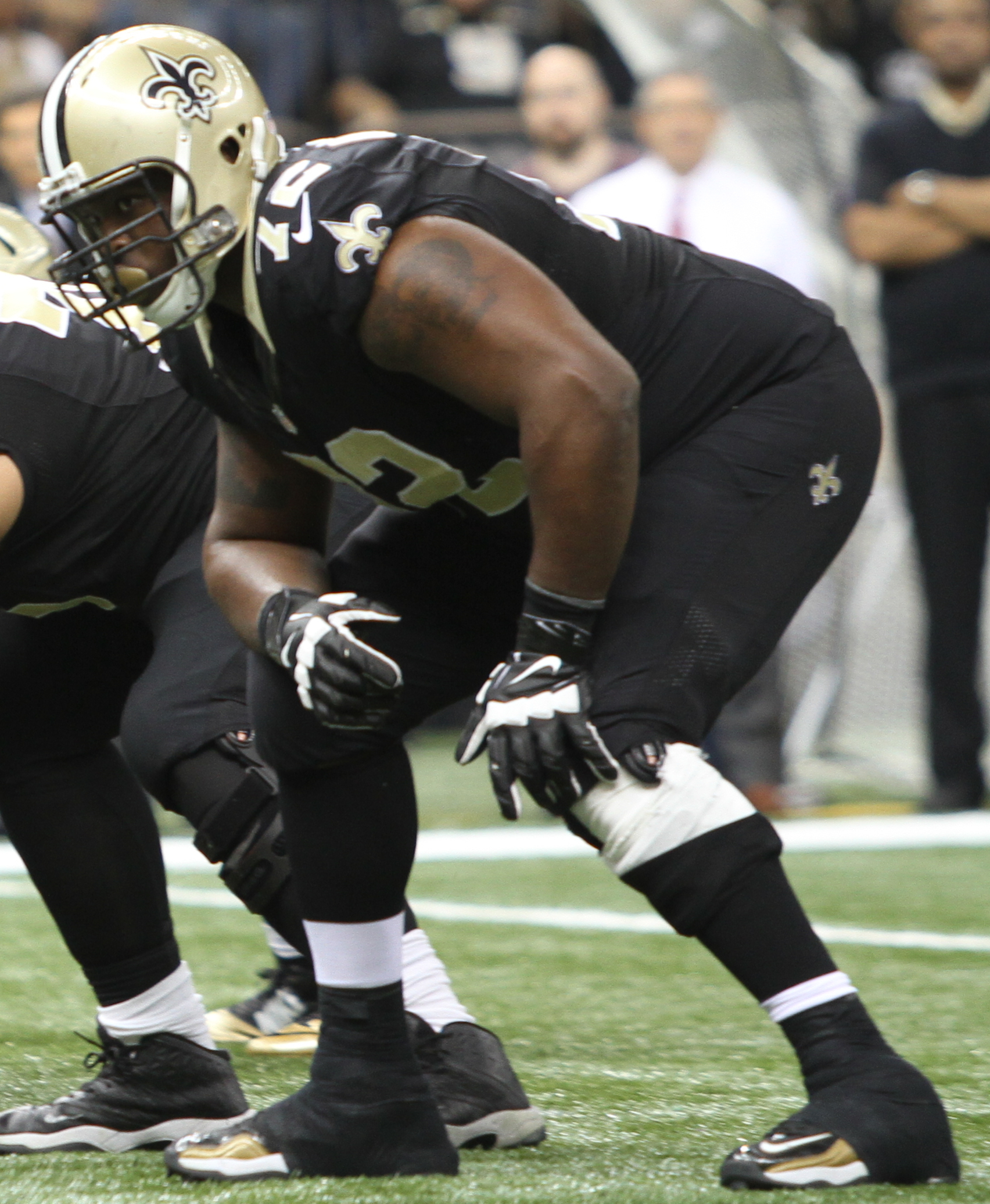
- Armstead with the New Orleans Saints in 2015

No. 72
- Position: Offensive tackle

Personal information
- Born: July 23, 1991 (age 35); Cahokia, Illinois, U.S.
- Listed height: 6 ft 5 in (1.96 m)
- Listed weight: 304 lb (138 kg)

Career information
- High school: Cahokia (Cahokia Heights, Illinois)
- College: Arkansas–Pine Bluff (2009–2012)
- NFL draft: 2013: 3rd round, 75th overall pick

Career history
- New Orleans Saints (2013–2021); Miami Dolphins (2022–2024)

Awards and highlights
- Second-team All-Pro (2018); 5× Pro Bowl (2018–2020, 2022, 2023); Black College Football Pro Player of the Year Award (2021); 3× First-team All-SWAC (2010–2012)

Career NFL statistics
- Games played: 135
- Games started: 131
- Stats at Pro Football Reference

Terron Armstead (born July 23, 1991) is an American former professional football player who was an offensive tackle for 12 seasons in the National Football League (NFL), primarily with the New Orleans Saints. He played college football for the Arkansas–Pine Bluff Golden Lions and was selected by the Saints in the third round of the 2013 NFL draft. He also played in the NFL for the Miami Dolphins.

== Early life ==
A native of Cahokia, Illinois, Armstead attended Cahokia High School, where he was a letterman in football and track. He grew from a 6-2, 250-pound offensive lineman as a junior to a 6-4, 300-pound senior, leading the Comanches to an 11–2 record and the league title, earning All-Southern Seven Conference and All-Class 5A selection.

In track & field, Armstead was named the News-Democrat Track & Field Athlete of the Year after capturing the state title in the shot put event with a 61 ft 5 in (18.72 m) throw. He also threw the discus.

== College career ==
Armstead enrolled in the University of Arkansas at Pine Bluff, where he played for the UAPB Golden Lions football team from 2009 to 2012. He was an All-Southwestern Athletic Conference (SWAC) selection during his final three seasons at Arkansas-Pine Bluff.

Armstead was also on the Arkansas-Pine Bluff Golden Lions track & field team, where he competed as a shot putter, discus thrower and hammer thrower. He got a personal-record of 18.73 meters in the shot put at the 2012 NCAA West Regional, placing 10th. At the 2012 Pepsi Florida Relays, he placed 4th in the discus throw with a career-best throw of 50.37 meters.

== Professional career ==
=== Pre-draft ===
At the 2013 NFL Combine, Armstead ran a 4.71-second 40-yard dash, which was the fastest 40-yard dash time of any offensive lineman at the combine since it first began in 1982.

Pre-draft measurables
Height	Weight	Arm length	Hand span	Wingspan	40-yard dash	10-yard split	20-yard split	20-yard shuttle	Three-cone drill	Vertical jump	Broad jump	Bench press
6 ft 4 3/4 in (1.95 m)	306 lb (139 kg)	34 in (0.86 m)	9 1/4 in (0.23 m)	6 ft 9 5/8 in (2.07 m)	4.71 s	1.68 s	2.77 s	4.72 s	7.62 s	34.5 in (0.88 m)	9 ft 4 in (2.84 m)	31 reps
All values from NFL Combine

=== New Orleans Saints ===
==== 2013 ====
Armstead was selected in the third round, 75th overall, of the 2013 NFL draft by the New Orleans Saints, which became the earliest draft choice for a player from Arkansas-Pine Bluff. The selection was announced by retired Saint Steve Gleason, at the time using a wheelchair and a computerized voice due to his advanced ALS. On May 9, 2013, the Saints signed Armstead to a four-year, $2.86 million contract, with a $617,436 signing bonus. Armstead began his rookie season as the back up left tackle behind Charles Brown. On September 22, he played in his first NFL career regular season game in a Week 3 win against the Arizona Cardinals. On December 22, he made his first NFL career start in a Week 16 loss to the Carolina Panthers. He remained the starting left tackle for the last three games of the season, which included playing in two postseason games. He made his first NFL career postseason start in a Wild Card win against the Philadelphia Eagles.

==== 2014 ====
He began the 2014 season as the Saints' starting left tackle after Brown left the team via free agency during the off season. Armstead started the first 14 regular season games, despite a concussion in a Week 4 loss to the Dallas Cowboys, but missed the last two due to injury.

==== 2015 ====
Armstead returned as the Saints' starting left tackle for the 2015 season and started the first four games. After missing two games due to a knee injury, he returned in Week 7 and played 9 consecutive regular season games, missing the last game of the season against the Atlanta Falcons. Armstead was voted as a Pro Bowl alternate in 2015. After a promising season, he was rated the third-best offensive tackle in 2015 by Pro Football Focus.

==== 2016–2021 ====
On May 3, 2016, Armstead and the Saints agreed to a five-year, $65 million contract extension. The contract is guaranteed for $38 million and includes an $11 million signing bonus. After starting the first two games of the 2016 season, Armstead was unable to play for Weeks 3 and 4 after suffering a knee injury. He was placed on injured reserve on December 14, 2016. On June 14, 2017, during minicamp, Armstead suffered a torn labrum which required surgery, which was expected to make him miss 4–6 months. He returned earlier than expected, however, and started ten games at left tackle during the regular season.

Armstead was placed on the reserve/COVID-19 list by the team on November 28, 2020, and activated on December 9. He was ranked 79th by his fellow players on the NFL Top 100 Players of 2021.

=== Miami Dolphins ===
On March 22, 2022, the Miami Dolphins signed Armstead to a five-year, $75 million deal worth up to $87.5 million, with $43.37 million in guaranteed money. On November 27, he was diagnosed with a Grade 2 pectoral strain (partial tear) and ruled out approximately 2–3 weeks. Armstead was named to his fourth Pro Bowl in the 2022 NFL season. He was ranked 83rd by his fellow players on the NFL Top 100 Player of 2023.

Armstead started the 2023 season with multiple injuries, only participating in two games as of Week 4. On October 6, 2023, he was placed on injured reserve. Kendall Lamm filled in for Armstead at left tackle. He was activated on November 4. Armstead started 15 games for the Dolphins during the 2024 season, and logged two fumble recoveries.

On April 5, 2025, Armstead announced his retirement from professional football.

=== Regular season statistics ===
Legend
**Bold**	Career high

Year	Team	Games		Offense					
Year	Team	GP	GS	Snaps	Pct	Holding	False start	Decl/Pen	Acpt/Pen
2013	NO	6	2	137	32%	1	2	0	3
2014	NO	14	14	836	83%	3	3	**1**	**7**
2015	NO	13	13	928	**98%**	1	**4**	0	5
2016	NO	7	7	398	79%	0	0	**1**	0
2017	NO	10	10	541	83%	2	0	0	3
2018	NO	10	10	602	88%	1	1	0	2
2019	NO	15	15	**935**	92%	**5**	1	0	6
2020	NO	14	14	858	92%	1	1	**1**	3
2021	NO	8	8	467	90%	1	2	0	3
2022	MIA	13	13	688	86%	2	2	**1**	5
2023	MIA	10	10	524	81%	1	1	0	3
2024	MIA	15	15	820	81%	1	0	0	1
Career		135	131	7,734	-	20	17	4	41

== Personal life ==
Armstead was named HBCU Top 30 Under 30 by HBCU Buzz in July 2014.
