= Fairmont City, Illinois =

- Village
- Motto: City of good neighbors
- Location in St. Clair and Madison counties, Illinois
- Coordinates: 38°38′52″N 90°07′35″W
- Country: United States
- State: Illinois
- Counties: St. Clair; Madison
- Townships: Canteen; Stites; Nameoki
- Incorporated: March 3, 1914

Area
  - Total: 6.55 sq mi (16.96 km^{2})
  - Land: 6.20 sq mi (16.07 km^{2})
  - Water: 0.34 sq mi (0.89 km^{2})
- Elevation: 420 ft (130 m)

Population (2020)
  - Total: 2,265
  - Density: 365.1/sq mi (140.95/km^{2})
- Time zone: UTC-6 (CST)
  - Summer (DST): UTC-5 (CDT)
- ZIP Code: 62201
- Area code: 618
- FIPS code: 17-24933
- GNIS feature ID: 2398855
- Website: www.fairmontcityil.com

Fairmont City is a village in St. Clair and Madison counties, Illinois, United States. The population was 2,265 at the 2020 census, down from 2,635 in 2010. In the 1990s Fairmont City's Hispanic population doubled, and as of 2020, over 79% of the population was of Hispanic descent.

== History ==
The Granby Mining Company of Granby, Missouri, built a zinc smelter in Fairmont City in 1912. A petition to incorporate the village was filed with St. Clair County on February 11, 1914. Residents voted for incorporation on March 3, when the community had a population of more than 300. The first village election followed in April, and Philip H. Cohn became the first mayor.

The American Zinc Company acquired the Granby operation in 1916. Primary zinc-smelting operations ended in 1953, but ore roasting and sulfuric acid production continued until the plant closed entirely in 1967. The smelter became the economic center of a working-class immigrant community.

Fairmont City Hall was built by the Works Progress Administration in 1936. Around 1940, Mexican community leaders formed the Mexican-American Society of Fairmont City to help newcomers and provide social opportunities.

== Geography ==
Fairmont City is located in northwestern St. Clair County. A small part of the village extends north into southwestern Madison County. The community is bordered to the northwest by Brooklyn, to the north by Madison, to the northeast by Pontoon Beach, to the east by Collinsville, to the southeast by Caseyville, to the south by Washington Park, and to the southwest by East St. Louis. The village limits extend west 3 miles (5 km) from the main portion of Fairmont City to touch the Mississippi River directly across from St. Louis.

According to the 2021 census gazetteer files, Fairmont City has a total area of 6.55 square miles (16.96 km^{2}), of which 6.21 square miles (16.08 km^{2}) (or 94.78%) is land and 0.34 square miles (0.88 km^{2}) (or 5.22%) is water.

Fairmont City is built atop portions of the Cahokia Mounds, a UNESCO World Heritage Site. Sam Chucalo Mound, one of the mounds, is in the western part of the village. Other mounds are in the eastern part of the village within Cahokia Mounds State Historic Site.

In April 2016, the US Environmental Protection Agency added the Old American Zinc Fairmont City site to the National Priorities List following the Illinois EPA discovering high levels of lead, arsenic, cadmium and zinc in soil samples. Collected soil samples from properties and alleyways showed residue of arsenic, cadmium and zinc.

National City, a former company town to the west of Fairmont City, was dissolved in 1997, and annexed by Fairmont City.

== Demographics ==
Historical population
Census	Pop.	Note	%±
1920	1,056		—
1930	1,827		73.0%
1940	1,905		4.3%
1950	2,284		19.9%
1960	2,688		17.7%
1970	2,769		3.0%
1980	2,313		−16.5%
1990	2,140		−7.5%
2000	2,436		13.8%
2010	2,635		8.2%
2020	2,265		−14.0%
U.S. Decennial Census

As of the 2020 census there were 2,265 people, 753 households, and 410 families residing in the village. The population density was 345.96 inhabitants per square mile (133.58/km^{2}). There were 755 housing units at an average density of 115.32 per square mile (44.53/km^{2}), of which 5.8% were vacant. The homeowner vacancy rate was 0.2% and the rental vacancy rate was 5.9%. The racial makeup of the village was 31.52% White, 0.18% African American, 3.44% Native American, 0.49% Asian, 0.00% Pacific Islander, 45.25% from other races, and 19.12% from two or more races. Hispanic or Latino of any race were 79.21% of the population.

There were 753 households, out of which 40.4% had children under the age of 18 living with them, 40.64% were married couples living together, 7.57% had a female householder with no husband present, and 45.55% were non-families. 38.38% of all households were made up of individuals, and 18.06% had someone living alone who was 65 years of age or older. The average household size was 3.88 and the average family size was 2.76.

The village's age distribution consisted of 24.3% under the age of 18, 12.3% from 18 to 24, 28% from 25 to 44, 19.4% from 45 to 64, and 16.1% who were 65 years of age or older. The median age was 34.9 years. For every 100 females, there were 115.1 males. For every 100 females age 18 and over, there were 113.4 males.

The median income for a household in the village was $37,775, and the median income for a family was $45,250. Males had a median income of $36,065 versus $23,659 for females. The per capita income for the village was $18,321. About 31.7% of families and 33.5% of the population were below the poverty line, including 51.1% of those under age 18 and 26.9% of those age 65 or over.

Fairmont City village, Illinois – Racial and ethnic composition Note: the US Census treats Hispanic/Latino as an ethnic category. This table excludes Latinos from the racial categories and assigns them to a separate category. Hispanics/Latinos may be of any race.
Race / Ethnicity (NH = Non-Hispanic)	Pop 2000	Pop 2010	Pop 2020	% 2000	% 2010	% 2020
White alone (NH)	1,034	705	424	42.45%	26.76%	18.72%
Black or African American alone (NH)	21	18	1	0.86%	0.68%	0.04%
Native American or Alaska Native alone (NH)	11	11	2	0.45%	0.42%	0.09%
Asian alone (NH)	1	8	11	0.04%	0.30%	0.49%
Native Hawaiian or Pacific Islander alone (NH)	0	0	0	0.00%	0.00%	0.00%
Other race alone (NH)	0	0	3	0.00%	0.00%	0.13%
Mixed race or Multiracial (NH)	20	11	30	0.82%	0.42%	1.32%
Hispanic or Latino (any race)	1,349	1,882	1,794	55.38%	71.42%	79.21%
Total	2,436	2,635	2,265	100.00%	100.00%	100.00%

== Village services ==
The Fairmont City Library was International Grand Prize First Place for the Libraryaware for Library-community interaction in 2017, beating out the Kansas City Public Library and Catawba County Library in North Carolina.

== Notable person ==
- Johnny Wyrostek, baseball player and Fairmont City Mayor from 1967 till his death in 1986.
