= Thomas Holbrook =

American politician

Tom Holbrook

St. Clair County Clerk
- Incumbent
- Assumed office July 1, 2013
- Preceded by: Bob Delaney

Chairman of the Illinois Pollution Control Board
- In office October 23, 2011 – June 30, 2013
- Preceded by: Tanner Girard
- Succeeded by: Deanna Glosser

Member of the Illinois House of Representatives from the 113th district
- In office January 11, 1995 – October 22, 2011
- Preceded by: Monroe L. Flinn
- Succeeded by: Scott E. Penny

Personal details
- Born: May 23, 1949 (age 77) St. Louis, Missouri
- Party: Democratic
- Spouse: Molly
- Children: One Daughter
- Profession: Politician

Thomas Holbrook (born May 23, 1949) is an Illinois politician who serves as the St. Clair County Clerk. He was appointed to replace Bob Delaney. Prior to this he served as Chairman of the Illinois Pollution Control Board from 2011 to 2013 and a Democratic member of the Illinois House of Representatives representing the 113th District for eight terms from 1995 until 2011.
