= Southwestern Illinois College =

Public community college in Illinois, US

Coordinates: 38°30′59.7″N 89°55′24.7″W

- Former names: Belleville Junior College (1946–1967); Belleville Area College (1967–2000)
- Motto: Think it. Be it.
- Type: Public community college
- Established: 1946; 80 years ago
- Accreditation: HLC
- President: Nick Mance
- Faculty: 139 full-time, 700 part-time
- Students: 7,188 (Fall 2022)
- Location: Belleville, Granite City, Red Bud, Illinois, U.S.
- Campus: Suburban/urban
- Colors: Blue and white
- Nickname: Blue Storm
- Sporting affiliations: NJCAA - Great Rivers Athletic Conference
- Mascot: Kashmir the Snow Leopard
- Website: www.swic.edu

Southwestern Illinois College is a public community college in Illinois with campuses in Belleville, Granite City, and Red Bud. It also has off-campus sites throughout the district, including Scott Air Force Base and the East St. Louis Community College Center.

== History ==
The college was founded in 1946 as Belleville Junior College, operating under the jurisdiction of Belleville Township High School District 201. More than 60 percent of the 169 students enrolled for its first semester were World War II veterans who had just returned from service.

In 1965, the Illinois General Assembly passed the Illinois Junior College Act, which created community college districts throughout the state. The following year, area residents voted to establish the Class I Belleville Junior College District 522. Belleville Junior College became Belleville Area College July 1, 1967.

Construction of the Belleville Campus on Carlyle Avenue was completed in 1971. In 1983, the college opened the Granite City Center, followed by the Red Bud Center two years later. Both sites received approval for campus status from the Illinois Community College Board in July 1985. In 1999, a vote to change the name of Belleville Area College was passed. On January 1, 2000, the college name changed to Southwestern Illinois College.

== Campuses ==
The college has three campuses, on Carlyle Avenue in Belleville and in Granite City and Red Bud.

== Academics ==
SWIC is accredited by the Higher Learning Commission. The college offers associate degrees and certificates. SWIC also serves the community through Community Education, Programs and Services for Older Persons (PSOP), and Selsius™ Corporate and Career Training.

From 2020 through at least 2022, SWIC has offered one-year long special vocational training in East St. Louis, Illinois using state grants varying in size from $1.2 to $1.4 million. Local residents (in a city with a 97.4% African-American population) are offered training in Welding, Nurse Assistant, Food Service, Forklift Training, and Heating, Ventilation, Air Conditioning and Refrigeration, Phlebotomy, Practical Nursing. Since 2019, 130 students have received credentials in this program.

== Student life ==
There are no dorms on campus. Southwestern Illinois College has many clubs on all three campuses, including College Democrats and Phi Theta Kappa, as well as other college activities.

Every year the students elect someone to represent them on the Board of Trustees of Southwestern Illinois College.

=== Sports ===
College athletics teams are called the Blue Storm.

=== Arts ===
The William and Florence Schmidt Art Center is located on the Belleville campus of the college.

== Notable people ==
=== Alumni ===
- Cbabi Bayoc - illustrator
- Lawrence Blackledge – Professional basketball player
- Justin Hampson – New York Mets player
- Josh Harrellson – Professional basketball player
- Matt Hughes – retired mixed martial artist, former Ultimate Fighting Championship Welterweight Champion, UFC Hall of Fame member
- Sandra Magnus – NASA astronaut
- Zeke Moore (basketball) – Professional basketball player
- Scott E. Penny - police chief and politician
- Jaynetta Saunders - Professional basketball player
- Randy Wells – Chicago Cubs/Texas Rangers player

=== Faculty ===
- Otis L. Miller, Jr. – professor and politician
- Scott E. Penny - police chief and politician
- Van Allen Plexico – author

== See also ==
- List of community colleges in Illinois
