= Otis L. Miller Jr. =

American politician (1933–2010)

Member of the Illinois House of Representatives
- In office 1961–1962

Personal details
- Born: August 8, 1933 Belleville, Illinois, U.S.
- Died: May 1, 2010 (aged 76) St. Louis, Missouri, U.S.
- Party: Republican
- Parent: Otis L. Miller (father)
- Education: Southern Illinois University (Bachelor's degree, master's degree); Saint Louis University (Doctorate)
- Occupation: Politician, educator

Otis L. "Otie" Miller Jr. (August 8, 1933 – May 1, 2010) was an American educator and politician.

Born in Belleville, Illinois, his father was Otis L. Miller, who was a major league baseball player and who served in the Illinois General Assembly. Miller received his bachelor's and master's degrees from Southern Illinois University and his doctorate degree from Saint Louis University. He taught high school at Belleville Township High School and college at Belleville Junior College. Miller also owned Belleville Coin Shop. He served in the Illinois House of Representatives in 1961 and 1962 as a Republican. Miller then served as acting mayor of Belleville in 1971 and 1972 and on the Belleville City Council. Miller died in Saint Louis, Missouri.
