= George McClellan Jr. (Illinois politician) =

American politician

Member-elect of the Illinois House of Representatives from the 114th district
- Assuming office January 2027
- Succeeding: Kevin Schmidt

Personal details
- Party: Democratic

George McClellan Jr. is an American politician. A member of the Democratic Party, he is the member-elect for the 114th district of the Illinois House of Representatives.
