= David A. Gall =

American jockey (1941–2021)

Personal information
- Born: December 17, 1941 Rose Valley, Saskatchewan, Canada
- Died: August 1, 2021 (aged 79) State College, Pennsylvania, United States
- Occupation: Jockey

Horse racing career
- Sport: Horse racing
- Career wins: 7,396

Racing awards
- United States Champion Jockey by wins (1979, 1981); Avelino Gomez Memorial Award (1996)

Honours
- Canadian Horse Racing Hall of Fame (1993)

Significant horses
- Leading rider at Fairmount Park (14 times)

David Allen Gall (December 17, 1941 – August 1, 2021) was a Canadian-American Thoroughbred horse racing Hall of Fame jockey, who ranked fifth in lifetime wins by North American jockeys and who was the first jockey in the United States to ride eight winners on a single racecard. Gall was born in Rose Valley, Saskatchewan.

== Riding career ==
Gall began his career riding at tracks in Regina, Saskatchewan, Edmonton and Calgary in Alberta, and Winnipeg, Manitoba before going to the Hastings Racecourse in Vancouver, British Columbia. He would follow the path of other Canadian jockeys like George Woolf and Johnny Longden and head south to tracks in California. Eventually he made his way to Illinois where, dubbed "The General" by fans and the media, he would dominate racing at Fairmount Park Racetrack and Cahokia Downs.

== Achievements ==
During a 43-year career, Gall was a two-time winner of the United States national riding title, winning more races than any other rider in 1979 and 1981. On October 18, 1978, he won eight races on a single racecard at Cahokia Downs. He finished in first place in all but two of the 10 races, and narrowly missed winning a ninth race by placing second in a photo finish (a reporter noted that except for that race "there would not have been any need for asterisks". Hubert Jones had won 8 of 13 races in 1944 at Agua Caliente in Tijuana in Mexico, and Jorge Tejeira had won 8 races out of 12, although at two different race courses in the same day. and won seven races on five occasions.

== Honors ==
In 1993, Gall was inducted into the Canadian Horse Racing Hall of Fame. In 1996 he was the recipient of the Avelino Gomez Memorial Award, given annually to a jockey who is Canadian-born, Canadian-raised, or a regular in the country for more than five years, who has made significant contributions to the sport.

Gall retired from riding on September 18, 1999, ranked fourth all-time among jockeys for races won in the history of American Thoroughbred racing with 7,396 victories from 41,709 mounts. He has remained in the industry as a trainer/owner until retiring in 2011.

== Death ==
Gall died on August 1, 2021, at his home in State College, Pennsylvania.
