= Otis L. Miller =

American baseball player (1901–1959)

- Third baseman
- Born: February 2, 1901; Belleville, Illinois, U.S.
- Died: July 26, 1959 (aged 58); Belleville, Illinois, U.S.
- Batted: Right Threw: Right

MLB debut
- April 17, 1927, for the St. Louis Browns

Last MLB appearance
- April 29, 1932, for the Boston Red Sox

MLB statistics
- Batting average: .274
- Home runs: 0
- Runs batted in: 91
- Stats at Baseball Reference

Teams
- St. Louis Browns (1927); Boston Red Sox (1930–1932)

Otis Louis Miller (February 2, 1901 – July 26, 1959) was an American politician and baseball player.

== Baseball career ==
Miller was a Major League Baseball third baseman who played for the St. Louis Browns (1927) and Boston Red Sox (1930–1932). Miller batted and threw right-handed. He was born in Belleville, Illinois. In a four-season career, Miller was a .274 hitter (229-for-837) with 95 runs and 91 RBI in 272 games played.

== Political career ==
Miller served in the Illinois House of Representatives from 1949 until his death as a Republican. His son Otis L. Miller, Jr. also served in the Illinois House of Representatives in 1961 and 1962.

Miller died in Belleville, Illinois, at the age of 58.
