= William and Florence Schmidt Art Center =

Coordinates: 38.5172°N 89.9222°W

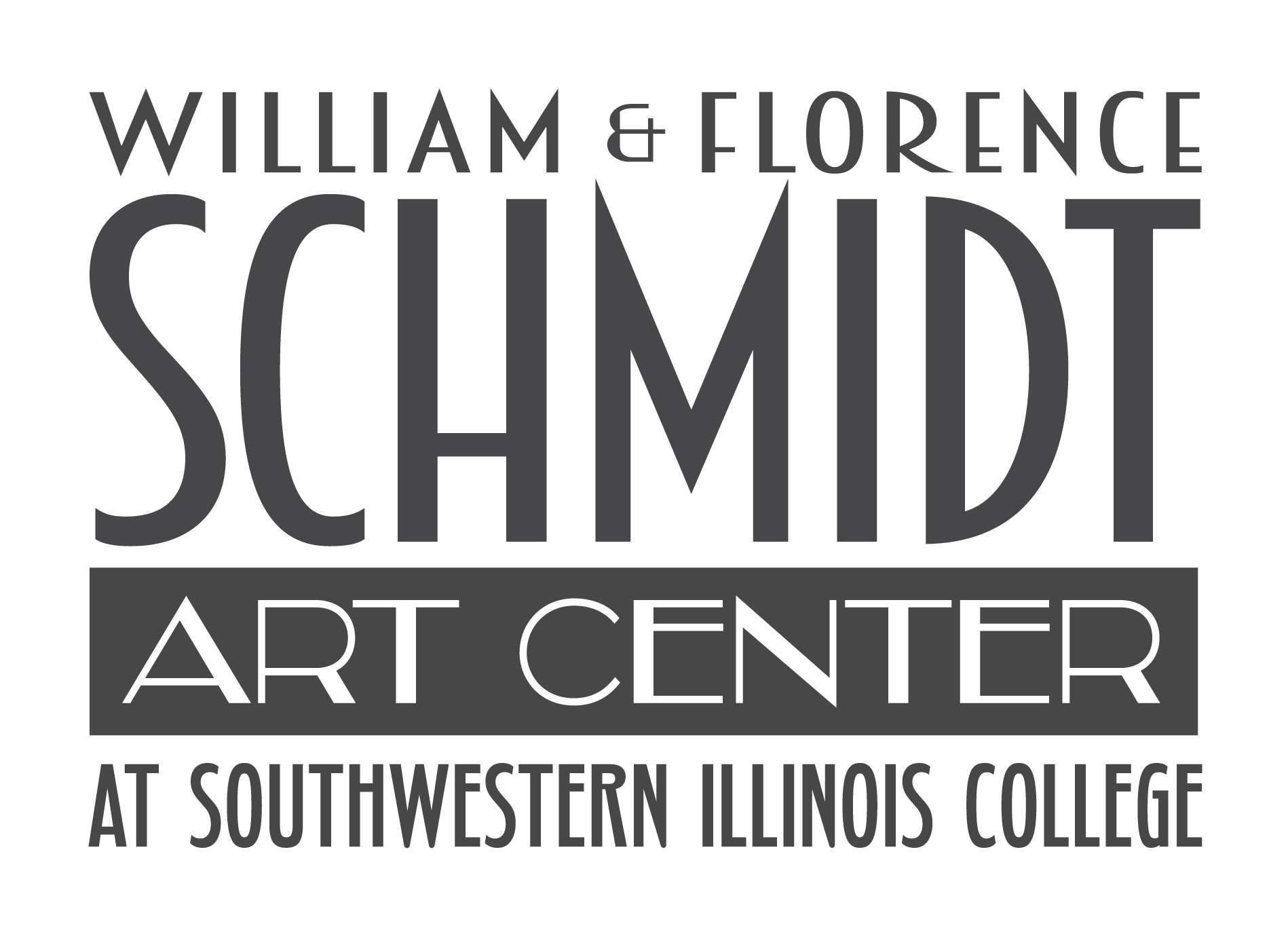
- Established: 2001
- Location: Belleville, Illinois
- Type: Art Center
- Collection size: 906
- Director: Paula Haniszewski
- Curator: Dawn Blum
- Employees: Kelsey Huelsmann
- Public transit access: SCCTD; Red; At College station
- Website: www.swic.edu/theschmidt

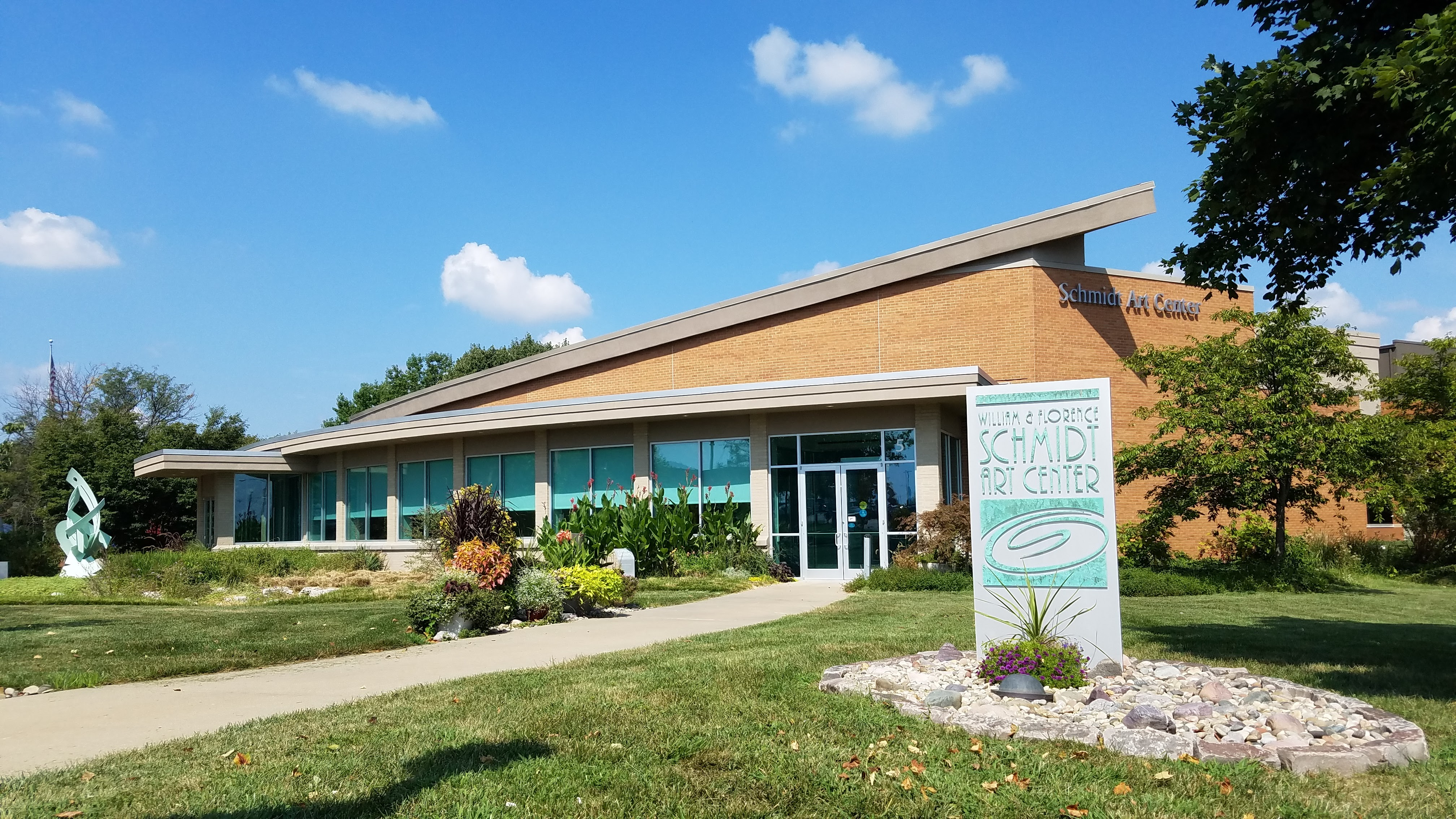
Exterior of the William and Florence Schmidt Art Center

Spanning 6500 square feet, the William and Florence Schmidt Art Center, located on the Belleville campus of Southwestern Illinois College, facilitates visual literacy through exhibitions of art and cultural artifacts while igniting inspiration, imparting knowledge, and fostering connections between the college and the local community.

Throughout the year, the Schmidt Art Center presents an array of exhibits featuring artwork created by established professionals and emerging artists from the metro area and beyond. The center also hosts cultural events, collaborating with professional artists, poets, and musicians. With a collection of over nine hundred works, the Schmidt Art Center holds the most extensive art collection of any two-year college in Illinois, encompassing paintings, photographs, sculptures, and artifacts.

The collection was mostly acquired through private donations and funds from the Illinois Art in Architecture program.

Owned by Southwestern Illinois College, The Schmidt operates under its Foundation and may be rented for private events.
