= Cahokia Unit School District 187 =

School district in St. Clair County, Illinois, United States

Address
- 1700 Jerome Lane Cahokia Heights, Illinois, 62206; United States

District information
- Type: Public
- Grades: PreK–12
- NCES District ID: 1708040

Students and staff
- Students: 3,187

Other information
- Website: www.cusd187.org

Cahokia Unit School District 187 is a school district based in Cahokia Heights, Illinois in Greater St. Louis/Metro East.

Its service area includes Cahokia Heights, Sauget, and small portions of East St. Louis.

== History ==
The community used to be served by Cahokia School District 50. There was a single school, Cahokia School.

On April 1, 1950 the groundbreaking for the building of the Cahokia Commonfields High and Junior High was held. The district started operations in the 1951-1952 school year.

The non-high school district 202, which included the elementary school districts 182 and 184, was dissolved in July 1956. The area from this district was divided between Cahokia and East St. Louis School District 189, and therefore Cahokia district took students of all grade levels from the former 202 district. The Cahokia district received around 33% of the students and around 33% of the District 182's assessed valuation, while the East St. Louis district received the three District 182 elementary schools and the remaining students and assessed valuation.

In the 1958-1959 school year the district had over 4,000 students. The peak enrollment was during the start of the 1970-1971 district; 8,422 students. The student population declined, and the enrollment was 4,066 at the start of the 1991-1992 school year.

In 2013 the district announced that due to budget issues it planned to eliminate athletic programs. In June of that year the district board voted 6-0 to keep athletics and arts programs, and to close two schools and consolidate other academic programs.

== Demographics ==
In 2013 the district had about 275 teachers.

== Schools ==
Secondary schools:

- Cahokia High School
- 8th Grade Academy
- 7th Grade Academy - It is a part of the Wirth Complex
  - The Wirth Junior High School campus on Mousette Lane opened in 1963. Prior to that time the school was in the Cahokia High School building. In the late 1990s it was renamed "Wirth Middle School". The Wirth and Oliver-Parks schools were combined into the Wirth/Parks Middle School in August 2002 but were demerged in 2008.
- Oliver-Parks 6th Grade Center
  - Oliver-Parks Middle School opened in 2000.

Elementary schools:

- Helen Huffman Elementary School
  - Huffman opened in 1960 as Helen Huffman Elementary School.
- Lalumier Elementary School (Centreville)
  - Opened in 1964.
- Maplewood Elementary School
  - The orchestra opened in 1934. It was Cahokia's first orchestra.
- Elizabeth Morris Elementary School
  - The school's records began in 1963.
- Penniman Elementary School
  - The school records date from 1960.

Alternative schools

- Cahokia School of Choice - This is a K-8 magnet school. It is located in the former St. Catherine’s Laboure parochial school of the Roman Catholic Diocese of Belleville. The school opened in August 2008 after the school district purchased the building from the diocese. It used to be K-12, but in 2013 the district voted to remove the school's high school program.

== Former schools ==
- Cahokia Elementary school - Currently used as the building of the Village of Cahokia Department of Housing
  - The school opened in 1955. It closed in 1975 before the start of the new school year. The district leased the building to the Cahokia village government and the district began offering the school for sale in 1977. The district sold the school to the village government for $1 in 1980. The village government had used the school building as a fitness center.
- Centerville Elementary School (Unincorporated area)
  - School records of Centerville Elementary began in 1943.
- Chenot Elementary School
  - The school opened in 1957. As a result of an enrollment decline, the school closed in 1983. The Concerned Citizens of Centreville leased the building for six years before its 1989 sale to the New Macedonia Baptist Church.
- Estelle Sauget Academic Center - It was for students who are at least two grade levels behind on standardized tests or those who have been retained at least once. It opened in August 2004.
- Estelle Sauget Freshman Academy - This school was attached to the district headquarters. The school board voted to close the school in 2013.
- Jerome Early Childhood Center
  - Jerome Elementary School opened in 1895. In the 1980s the district kept the school's special education section open, but due to a decline in enrollment it closed the regular program. While Jerome was closed in the 1980s the St. Catherine Laboure School leased the gymnasium and Southern Illinois University (SIU) leased other areas for its Head Start program. The school reopened in August 1990 after an enrollment increase during the late 1980s. After Pitzman, which had been used as the early childhood campus, closed, Jerome was converted into an early childhood center in August 2001. The school board voted to close Jerome in 2013.
- Pitzman Elementary School
  - The school opened in 1941. It was closed in 1953. During the late 1970s and early 1980s the district attempted to sell the school. The school reopened in 1990 with the ELF preschool program. The program was moved to Jerome when the district closed the Pitzman campus in 2001, after the school year ended. After the closure of Pitzman the district began leasing it to the Southern Illinois University Edwardsville (SIU-E) Head Start.
