= Cahokia Downs =

Horse racing track in Alorton, Illinois, US

Coordinates: 38°34′31.6″N 90°05′42.8″W

- Location: Alorton, Illinois; United States
- Owned by: East Saint Louis Jockey Club, Inc.
- Date opened: 1954
- Date closed: 1980
- Race type: Thoroughbred and Standardbred
- Notable races: St. Louis Derby

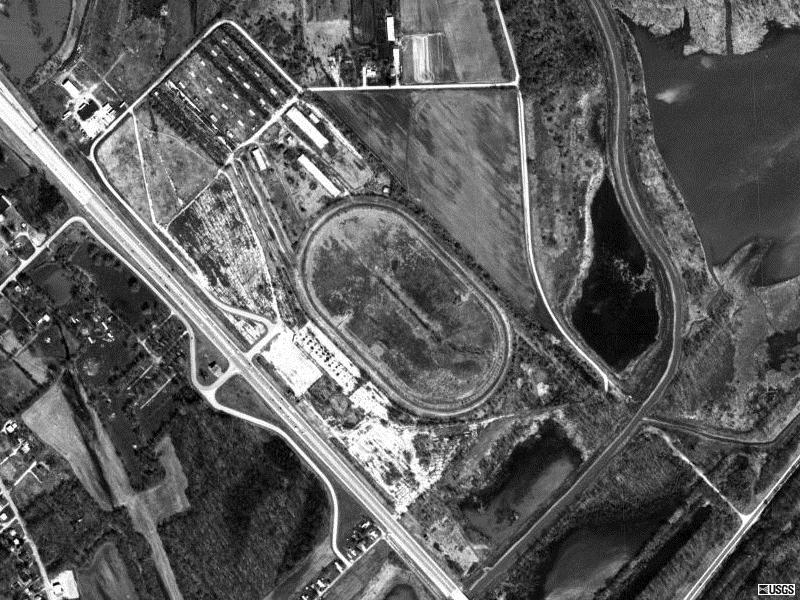
Aerial view of the track from 1998

Cahokia Downs was an American horse racing track located on Highway 15 near the town of Alorton, St. Clair County, Illinois. Run by the East St. Louis Jockey Club, the facility opened in 1954 and hosted both Standardbred harness racing and Thoroughbred flat racing events.

At Cahokia Downs on October 18, 1978, jockey David Gall became the first rider in United States Thoroughbred horse racing to win eight races on a single racecard.

In October 1979 the Illinois Racing Commission refused to authorize any 1980 racing dates for Cahokia Downs and on April 2, 1980, the business filed for bankruptcy. The track never reopened.

== Physical attributes ==
The track consisted of a .75-mile (1.207 km) oval with sandy clay soil, with chutes that enabled 5-furlong (1.006 km) races to be run around one turn and about 1^{1}/16 miles (1.710 km) around three turns. Distance from the last turn to the finish line was 500 feet (152 m). The front and back straightaways were both 80 feet (24.38 m) wide. The chute on the front straightaway was angled approximately 15 degrees to avoid bisecting a street in the stable area.
