= Cahokia High School =

High school in Illinois, US

Location
- 800 Range Lane; Cahokia Heights, Illinois 62206; United States; 38.5653°N 90.1652°W

Information
- Type: Public comprehensive high school
- Established: 1952; 74 years ago
- School district: Cahokia Unit School District 187
- Teaching staff: 45.82 (FTE)
- Grades: 9–12
- Enrollment: 850 (2024–25)
- Student to teacher ratio: 18.55
- Colors: Blue and white
- Nickname: Comanches
- Yearbook: Cahochron
- Website: cusd187.org/o/chs

Cahokia High School is a public high school in Cahokia Heights, Illinois, United States that is part of the Cahokia Unit School District 187.

== History ==
In 2013 the district announced that due to budget issues it planned to eliminate athletic programs. This would have eliminated Cahokia High School's programs. In June of that year the district board voted 6-0 to keep athletics and arts programs, but at the same time it voted to close two schools and consolidate other academic programs. Therefore the high school retained its academic programs.

== Academics ==
Eighty percent of Cahokia's graduates enroll in college or post-graduate training programs.

== Demographics ==
As of 2006, the student body of the school was 85.1% black, 13.8% white, 0.9% Hispanic and 0.2% Asian/Pacific Islander.

== Notable alumni ==
- Terron Armstead (class of 2009), former NFL player
- Byron Gettis (class of 1998), former MLB player
- Richard Stilwell (class of 1960), professional opera singer who has performed at the Metropolitan Opera, internationally, and in film.
