= Stites, Kentucky =

Unincorporated community in Kentucky, United States

Stites
- Unincorporated community
- Location within the state of Kentucky Stites (the United States)
- Coordinates: 38°1′0″N 85°54′17″W
- Country: United States
- State: Kentucky
- County: Bullitt
- Elevation: 427 ft (130 m)
- Time zone: UTC-5 (Eastern (EST))
  - Summer (DST): UTC-4 (EST)
- GNIS feature ID: 509135

Stites is an unincorporated community located in Bullitt County, Kentucky, United States.
