= Doctor Stites =

19-century Mississippi politician

Doctor Stites was a delegate to Mississippi's 1868 constitutional convention and a state legislator in Mississippi. He was a trustee of Alcorn University. He was a party to the dispute between new and old trustees after a changing of the guard.

He was one of about 17 African American delegates to Mississippi's 1868 constitutional convention, sixteen of them reported to have been from southern states.

He was accused of being paid off to relinquish a promised appointment as sheriff.

== See also ==
- African American officeholders from the end of the Civil War until before 1900
