= Centreville, Illinois =

- City
- Location of Centreville in St. Clair County, Illinois.
- Coordinates: 38°35′4″N 90°6′14″W
- Country: United States
- State: Illinois
- County: St. Clair

Area
  - Total: 4.22 sq mi (10.93 km^{2})
  - Land: 4.16 sq mi (10.78 km^{2})
  - Water: 0.058 sq mi (0.15 km^{2})

Population (2020)
  - Total: 4,232
  - Estimate (2019): 4,897
  - Density: 1,176.8/sq mi (454.37/km^{2})
- Time zone: UTC-6 (CST)
  - Summer (DST): UTC-5 (CDT)
- ZIP Code(s): 62207
- Area code: 618
- FIPS code: 17-12203
- Wikimedia Commons: Centreville, Illinois
- Website: www.cityofcentreville-il.com

Centreville was a city in St. Clair County, Illinois, United States. As of the 2020 census, Centreville had a population of 4,232. Historically a predominantly Black and working-class community, Centreville has faced persistent environmental challenges stemming from economic disinvestment, redlining, and neglect by local and state governments. On May 6, 2021, the city ceased to exist, being incorporated along with Alorton and Cahokia into the new city of Cahokia Heights. Before the merger, the city struggled with some of the highest poverty rates in Illinois, compounded by public health threats posed by chronic flooding and raw sewage overflows. The residents and advocates identify these as issues of environmental injustice rooted in racial and economic disparities.

== Geography ==
Centreville was located at 38°35′4″N 90°6′14″W (38.584583, -90.103768).

According to the 2010 census, Centreville had a total area of 4.287 square miles (11.10 km^{2}), of which 4.23 square miles (10.96 km^{2}) (or 98.67%) was land and 0.057 square miles (0.15 km^{2}) (or 1.33%) was water.

== Demographics ==
Historical population
Census	Pop.	Note	%±
1870	1,116		—
1960	12,769		—
1970	11,378		−10.9%
1980	9,747		−14.3%
1990	7,489		−23.2%
2000	5,951		−20.5%
2010	5,309		−10.8%
2020	4,232		−20.3%
U.S. Decennial Census

=== Racial and ethnic composition ===
Centreville city, Illinois – Racial and ethnic composition Note: the US Census treats Hispanic/Latino as an ethnic category. This table excludes Latinos from the racial categories and assigns them to a separate category. Hispanics/Latinos may be of any race.
Race / Ethnicity (NH = Non-Hispanic)	Pop 2000	Pop 2010	Pop 2020	% 2000	% 2010	% 2020
White alone (NH)	199	88	68	3.34%	1.66%	1.61%
Black or African American alone (NH)	5,658	5,121	3,969	95.08%	96.46%	93.79%
Native American or Alaska Native alone (NH)	8	14	1	0.13%	0.26%	0.02%
Asian alone (NH)	0	8	8	0.00%	0.15%	0.19%
Pacific Islander alone (NH)	0	0	3	0.00%	0.00%	0.07%
Other race alone (NH)	5	3	16	0.08%	0.06%	0.38%
Mixed race or Multiracial (NH)	47	51	129	0.79%	0.96%	3.05%
Hispanic or Latino (any race)	34	24	38	0.57%	0.45%	0.90%
Total	5,951	5,309	4,232	100.00%	100.00%	100.00%

=== 2020 census ===
As of the 2020 census, Centreville had a population of 4,232. The median age was 36.6 years. 27.4% of residents were under the age of 18 and 19.6% were 65 years of age or older. For every 100 females, there were 81.0 males, and for every 100 females age 18 and over, there were 76.1 males age 18 and over.

100.0% of residents lived in urban areas, while 0.0% lived in rural areas.

There were 1,757 households in Centreville, of which 31.5% had children under the age of 18 living in them. Of all households, 16.1% were married-couple households, 22.8% were households with a male householder and no spouse or partner present, and 55.7% were households with a female householder and no spouse or partner present. About 35.0% of all households were made up of individuals and 18.5% had someone living alone who was 65 years of age or older.

There were 2,041 housing units, of which 13.9% were vacant. The homeowner vacancy rate was 1.8% and the rental vacancy rate was 7.0%.

=== 2000 census ===
As of the census of 2000, there were 5,951 people, 2,125 households, and 1,476 families residing in the city. The population density was 1,373.3 inhabitants per square mile (530.2/km^{2}). There were 2,363 housing units at an average density of 545.3 per square mile (210.5/km^{2}). The racial makeup of the city was 95.46% African American, 3.38% white, 0.13% Native American, 0.02% Pacific Islander, 0.13% from other races, and 0.87% from two or more races. Hispanic or Latino of any race were 0.57% of the population.

There were 2,125 households, out of which 34.8% had children under the age of 18 living with them, 27.5% were married couples living together, 35.2% had a female householder with no husband present, and 30.5% were non-families. 26.8% of all households were made up of individuals, and 11.8% had someone living alone who was 65 years of age or older. The average household size was 2.80 and the average family size was 3.38.

In the city, the population was spread out, with 33.5% under the age of 18, 9.2% from 18 to 24, 23.9% from 25 to 44, 20.1% from 45 to 64, and 13.2% who were 65 years of age or older. The median age was 31 years. For every 100 females, there were 85.3 males. For every 100 females age 18 and over, there were 77.2 males.

The median income for a household in the city was $23,500, and the median income for a family was $27,310. Males had a median income of $32,024 versus $23,528 for females. The per capita income for the city was $11,150. About 28.7% of families and 34.4% of the population were below the poverty line, including 48.4% of those under age 18 and 14.6% of those age 65 or over.

== Education ==
Some of the city was served by Cahokia Unit School District 187. Lalumier K-8 School is located in Centreville. Centerville K-8 is located in an unincorporated area near Centreville.

Some of the city was served by East St. Louis School District 189. Brown Elementary School is located in Centreville.

== Poverty ==
Centreville was the poorest city in the state of Illinois, as well as one of the poorest cities in the nation. The town median household income was $17,441, while the typical home in the area is worth approximately $47,900. The city was located on a Mississippi River floodplain known as American Bottom, and experiences chronic flooding and raw sewage disposal problems due to the area's inadequate system of drainage ditches, levees and emergency pumps.

A key contributor to Centreville’s entrenched poverty is its history of redlining and racial segregation. In the 20th century, Centreville and other towns in the Metro East region were subjected to discriminatory housing policies that limited Black residents’ ability to purchase homes in more prosperous, majority-white neighborhoods. Banks routinely denied loans to Black families, and the federal government excluded these neighborhoods from investments that supported homeownership and community development. These practices created a cycle of disinvestment that left Centreville underdeveloped and vulnerable to economic decline.

As a result, Centreville developed as a predominantly Black, working-class community with limited resources and weak tax bases. Industrial pollution, failing infrastructure, and neglected land use planning further entrenched environmental degradation in the area. The lack of investment in flood control infrastructure and sewage systems can be directly traced to these discriminatory policies. As residents were left to bear the burden of deteriorating services, the city’s ability to address poverty and environmental hazards diminished over time.

== Environmental Justice ==
Centreville’s environmental problems are rooted in decades of racial and economic disparities, with structural neglect in basic services such as sewage and stormwater management. Today, much of the area suffers from frequent flooding, with raw sewage regularly backing up into homes, yards, and streets. These conditions have created severe public health risks for residents and exemplify environmental injustice in a predominantly Black community, as described by organizations such as, Equity Legal Services, Earthjustice and the Natural Resources Defense Council, which have documented the structural racism behind Centreville’s infrastructure failures.

Floodwaters routinely overwhelm residential areas, especially during heavy rainfall. In many cases, sewage overflows from manholes or seeps into basements and kitchens, leaving hazardous waste and terrible odors behind. This issue has persisted for years, affecting the Centreville residents repeatedly. The Illinois Environmental Protection Agency (Illinois EPA) officials and local city representatives have publicly acknowledged the severity of the infrastructure failures, but progress has been hampered due to funding delays and lack of coordinated planning.

The environmental hazards in Centreville are deeply racialized. Residents themselves have drawn attention to how systemic neglect correlated with the city’s racial demographics. In an interview with The Guardian, residents described how sewage backups made parts of their homes uninhabitable and called out the disparity in response compared to majority-white areas. One woman stated, "My floors buckled. My kitchen sink is rotting out. If white people were still here, this wouldn’t happen." The long-term neglect of Centreville’s infrastructure reflects how disparities in public investment can disproportionately impact communities of color, contributing to unequal access to essential services.

Academic researchers and local advocates have highlighted how the city’s geography contributes to the problem, arguing that historic disinvestment in flood infrastructure reflects a broader disregard for Black communities. Centreville is located on the Mississippi River floodplain known as the American Bottom, and inadequate maintenance of drainage channels and levees has worsened the impacts of stormwater. A study conducted by Williams College emphasized how channel infilling and poor drainage design make Centreville particularly vulnerable to repeated flooding.

The conditions that Centreville faces are not natural; they are engineered by policy decisions that failed to serve Black communities. Centreville’s infrastructure was neglected during decades when other communities were modernizing, mostly due to limited political representation and economic disparity. Without access to federal or state funding, local officials were unable to implement preventative measures or renew old systems.

The consequences have been devastating. Residents report living among black mold, collapsing floors, and constant repairs. Exposure to raw sewage and persistent mold has caused respiratory problems, structural damage to homes, and increased mental and physical health burdens for residents. Some have lost the ability to safely use their kitchens and bathrooms due to sewage backups. A federal lawsuit filed by over two dozen residents back in 2021 described conditions where "raw sewage pools in yards" and "backs up in tubs, toilets, and sinks"

Centreville Citizens for Change, a local advocacy group, and Equity Legal Services, Inc., a grassroots non-profit legal services organization, have led efforts to hold the government accountable and fight for tangible outcomes such as full sewer system repairs, transparency in government planning, and the enforcement of environmental protections. Groups like Earthjustice and the Metropolitan St. Louis Equal Housing and Opportunity Council have helped draw national attention to the crisis. Their efforts have involved litigation, community organizing, and lobbying for infrastructure investment.

These efforts have had a bit of success. In 2023, the Illinois Environmental Protection Agency (Illinois EPA) awarded a $9.9 million grant to address parts of Centreville’s sewage system. Unfortunately, local engineers estimate that fixing the full infrastructure will take over a decade and more than $100 million, largely because major drainage canals, particularly the Harding Ditch, have been severely neglected. Harding Ditch plays a central role in Centreville’s drainage system. Its poor maintenance has contributed significantly to flooding and sewage overflows, making its restoration essential to solving the area’s environmental problems.

Community members are also seeking federal help. At town hall meetings, residents and advocates have appealed to the U.S. Army Corps of Engineers to assist with dredging Harding Ditch and planning sustainable drainage systems. However, the Corps has limited jurisdiction and funding, making such partnerships difficult to obtain.

A Federal Emergency Management Agency (FEMA) buyout program has been introduced as an option for residents who want to relocate from high-risk areas, but compensation is still a concern. Many homes are so damaged that they have little to no market value, leaving the owners with few options. Due to the extensive water and sewage damage, these properties are no longer safe or insurable, making it difficult for owners to sell or relocate without taking on personal debt. This exemplifies how environmental injustice is compounded by economic vulnerability, leaving affected communities with few viable options.

Despite these challenges, Centreville residents continue to fight for their justice. A study led by José Constantine and James Manigault-Bryant of Williams College has partnered with residents to conduct community-based research on flooding and infrastructure vulnerability. Their support includes mapping flood zones, analyzing policy impacts, and co-developing public resources that amplify resident voices. These initiatives aim to improve infrastructure while also supporting education, community research, and local political advocacy.

== Notable people ==
- John Dettmer, pitcher for the MLB Texas Rangers
- Byron Gettis, outfielder for the MLB Kansas City Royals
- Jordan Goodwin, basketball player for the NBA Phoenix Suns
- Cedric Harmon, executive director, speaker, writer, and activist
- Reginald Hudlin, film director
