= Canteen Township, St. Clair County, Illinois =

Coordinates: 38°38′01″N 90°04′42″W

Canteen Township
- Township
- Location in St. Clair County

- St. Clair County's location in Illinois
- Country: United States
- State: Illinois
- County: St. Clair
- Established: March 5, 1910

Area
  - Total: 17.37 sq mi (45.0 km^{2})
  - Land: 16.96 sq mi (43.9 km^{2})
  - Water: 0.41 sq mi (1.1 km^{2}) 2.36%

Population (2010)
  - Estimate (2016): 9,698
  - Density: 605.1/sq mi (233.6/km^{2})
- Time zone: UTC-6 (CST)
  - Summer (DST): UTC-5 (CDT)
- FIPS code: 17-163-10968
- Website: canteentownship.org

Canteen Township is located in St. Clair County, Illinois. As of the 2010 census, its population was 10,263 and it contained 4,027 housing units. Canteen Township was formed from Centreville Station Township when it was subdivided on March 5, 1910.

== Geography ==
According to the 2010 census, the township has a total area of 17.37 square miles (45.0 km^{2}), of which 16.96 square miles (43.9 km^{2}) (or 97.64%) is land and 0.41 square miles (1.1 km^{2}) (or 2.36%) is water.

== Demographics ==
Historical population
Census	Pop.	Note	%±
2016 (est.)	9,698
U.S. Decennial Census
