= Cahokia Heights, Illinois =

City in the United States

- City
- Location of Cahokia Heights in St. Clair County, Illinois.
- Coordinates: 38°34′32″N 90°07′50″W
- Country: United States
- State: Illinois
- County: St. Clair
- Incorporated: May 6, 2021

Area
  - Total: 16.37 sq mi (42.4 km^{2})
- Elevation: 407 ft (124 m)

Population
  - Total: 17,894
- Time zone: UTC-6 (CST)
  - Summer (DST): UTC-5 (CDT)
- Zip code: 62206
- Area code: 618
- FIPS code: 17-10370
- GNIS feature ID: 2830177
- Website: cahokiaheightsil.us

Cahokia Heights is a city in St. Clair County, Illinois, United States. It was founded on May 6, 2021, by the merger of the villages of Cahokia and Alorton and the city of Centreville. Curtis McCall Sr. has served as the city's first mayor since 2021.

== History ==
The formation of Cahokia Heights was part of a campaign and four-phase plan called "Better Together".

Curtis McCall Sr., Centreville Township Supervisor, led the consolidation efforts. His son Curtis McCall Jr. was mayor (village president) of Cahokia at the time; the mayor (village president) of Alorton, and clerk, cashier was JoAnne Reed; and the mayor of Centreville was Marius "Mark" Jackson; all were proponents of the merger.

In the first phase of the plan was a March 2020 referendum to merge Alorton and Centreville, into a city named Alcentra, which passed by about 76% in each. The second phase of the plan was another referendum, held in November 2020, for Alorton, Cahokia, Centreville to merge into a city named Cahokia Heights. The referendum merging the 3 municipalities was approved, 61% to 37%, in the November 3, 2020, election.

The third and fourth phases were advertised as dissolving Centreville Township and the Commonfields of Cahokia district. The referendum to dissolve the Commonfields of Cahokia Public Water District passed with 82% approval in the April 2021 election. In the same election, voters of Cahokia Heights passed referendums to grant home rule to the city, to extend the Cahokia Public Library District across the city, and elect McCall Sr. as mayor.

== Geography ==
=== Climate ===
The climate is classified as continental (Köppen Dfa), bordering on subtropical (Köppen Cfa).

Climate data for Cahokia, Illinois, 1991–2020 normals, extremes 1997–present
Month	Jan	Feb	Mar	Apr	May	Jun	Jul	Aug	Sep	Oct	Nov	Dec	Year
Record high °F (°C)	72 (22)	86 (30)	86 (30)	92 (33)	95 (35)	107 (42)	107 (42)	105 (41)	102 (39)	94 (34)	85 (29)	75 (24)	107 (42)
Mean maximum °F (°C)	63.5 (17.5)	69.9 (21.1)	79.4 (26.3)	86.4 (30.2)	90.4 (32.4)	95.9 (35.5)	97.8 (36.6)	97.5 (36.4)	93.9 (34.4)	87.4 (30.8)	75.5 (24.2)	66.6 (19.2)	99.7 (37.6)
Mean daily maximum °F (°C)	40.7 (4.8)	46.0 (7.8)	56.1 (13.4)	67.5 (19.7)	76.1 (24.5)	84.8 (29.3)	88.5 (31.4)	87.3 (30.7)	80.3 (26.8)	69.5 (20.8)	56.2 (13.4)	45.1 (7.3)	66.5 (19.2)
Daily mean °F (°C)	31.4 (−0.3)	35.8 (2.1)	45.4 (7.4)	56.5 (13.6)	66.0 (18.9)	74.8 (23.8)	78.7 (25.9)	77.0 (25.0)	69.5 (20.8)	57.7 (14.3)	45.7 (7.6)	35.8 (2.1)	56.2 (13.4)
Mean daily minimum °F (°C)	22.0 (−5.6)	25.6 (−3.6)	34.7 (1.5)	45.4 (7.4)	56.0 (13.3)	64.9 (18.3)	68.9 (20.5)	66.7 (19.3)	58.6 (14.8)	46.0 (7.8)	35.3 (1.8)	26.6 (−3.0)	45.9 (7.7)
Mean minimum °F (°C)	2.9 (−16.2)	8.1 (−13.3)	17.0 (−8.3)	30.3 (−0.9)	39.4 (4.1)	52.0 (11.1)	57.9 (14.4)	53.9 (12.2)	44.3 (6.8)	28.7 (−1.8)	20.4 (−6.4)	10.5 (−11.9)	0.5 (−17.5)
Record low °F (°C)	−14 (−26)	−7 (−22)	4 (−16)	24 (−4)	33 (1)	45 (7)	50 (10)	47 (8)	35 (2)	22 (−6)	11 (−12)	−5 (−21)	−14 (−26)
Average precipitation inches (mm)	2.67 (68)	2.26 (57)	3.55 (90)	4.63 (118)	4.80 (122)	4.30 (109)	5.02 (128)	3.09 (78)	3.35 (85)	3.04 (77)	3.33 (85)	2.75 (70)	42.79 (1,087)
Average snowfall inches (cm)	4.9 (12)	3.7 (9.4)	1.2 (3.0)	0.3 (0.76)	0.0 (0.0)	0.0 (0.0)	0.0 (0.0)	0.0 (0.0)	0.0 (0.0)	0.0 (0.0)	0.8 (2.0)	2.9 (7.4)	13.8 (34.56)
Average precipitation days (≥ 0.01 in)	9.0	7.9	10.4	11.6	12.2	10.2	8.4	7.6	7.2	8.2	8.3	9.5	110.5
Average snowy days (≥ 0.1 in)	2.8	2.4	1.0	0.2	0.0	0.0	0.0	0.0	0.0	0.0	0.3	2.1	8.8
Source 1: NOAA
Source 2: National Weather Service (mean maxima/minima 2006–2020)

=== Adjacent communities ===
Sauget / East Saint Louis
Mississippi River East Saint Louis
Mississippi River Belleville
East Carondelet Unincorporated Centreville Township
Dupo

== Demographics ==
Historical population
Census	Pop.	Note	%±
2020	17,894		—
2024 (est.)	17,106		−4.4%
U.S. Decennial Census; Note: the 2020 pop count consists of the combined population of the three component cities merged to form Cahokia Heights

The United States Census Bureau began surveying Cahokia Heights in the 2023 American Community Survey listing a population of 17,173.

=== 2024 American Community Survey 5-Year Estimates ===
Racial Makeup of Cahokia Heights (2024): 1. White alone (20.2%); 2. Black alone (70.2%); 3. Native American alone (0.05%); 4. Asian alone (0.49%); 5. Pacific Islander alone (0.00%); 6. Some other race (1.84%); 7. Two or more races (7.23%)	Racial Makeup of Cahokia Heights treating Hispanics as a Racial Category (2024); NH=Non-Hispanic: 1. White NH (20.0%); 2. Black NH (69.7%); 3. Native American NH (0.05%); 4. Asian NH (0.49%); 5. Pacific Islander NH (0.00%); 6. Other race NH (0.42%); 7. Two or more races NH (7.23%); 8. Hispanic Any Race (2.10%)	Racial Makeup of Hispanics in Cahokia Heights (2024): 1. White alone (8.36%); 2. Black alone (24.0%); 3. Native American alone (0.00%); 4. Asian alone (0.00%); 5. Pacific Islander alone (0.00%); 6. Other race alone (67.7%); 7. Two or more races (0.00%)

== Education ==
Cahokia Unit School District 187 operates public schools, while some areas are served by East St. Louis School District 189.

== Transportation ==
Cahokia Heights is home to the St. Louis Downtown Airport, a general aviation facility.

Metro operates the #2 bus route to East St. Louis, Illinois, where connections can be made to the MetroLink light rail to St. Louis.
