= Alorton, Illinois =

Alorton
- Village
- Location of Alorton in St. Clair County, Illinois.

- Location of Illinois in the United States
- Coordinates: 38°35′3″N 90°7′4″W
- Country: United States
- State: Illinois
- County: St. Clair
- Incorporated: September 26, 1944
- Certified: December 4, 1944
- Dissolved: May 6, 2021

Area
  - Total: 1.84 sq mi (4.76 km^{2})
  - Land: 1.81 sq mi (4.68 km^{2})
  - Water: 0.031 sq mi (0.08 km^{2})

Population (2020)
  - Total: 1,566
  - Density: 1,051.7/sq mi (406.05/km^{2})
- Time zone: UTC-6 (CST)
  - Summer (DST): UTC-5 (CDT)
- ZIP Code(s): 62207
- Area code: 618
- FIPS code: 17-00958

Alorton (formerly Alcoa) was a village in St. Clair County, Illinois, United States. The name is an abbreviation of "aluminum ore town," and it was founded as a company town for the Aluminum Ore Company.

Incorporated in 1944, it was one of three municipalities that merged to form the city of Cahokia Heights on May 6, 2021; the other two were the village of Cahokia and the city of Centreville. Before the merging, Alorton had a population of 1,566 and land area of 1.8 square miles (4.7 km^{2}) in the 2020 Census.

Alorton was home to Cahokia Downs, an American horse racing track located on Highway 15 which hosted both Standardbred harness racing and Thoroughbred flat racing events from 1954 until 1979.

== Geography ==
Alorton was located at 38°35′3″N 90°7′4″W (38.584094, -90.117720).

According to the 2010 census, Alorton had a total area of 1.83 square miles (4.74 km^{2}), of which 1.8 square miles (4.66 km^{2}) (or 98.36%) is land and 0.03 square miles (0.08 km^{2}) (or 1.64%) is water.

== Demographics ==
Historical population
Census	Pop.	Note	%±
1950	2,547		—
1960	3,282		28.9%
1970	3,573		8.9%
1980	2,237		−37.4%
1990	2,960		32.3%
2000	2,749		−7.1%
2010	2,002		−27.2%
2020	1,566		−21.8%
U.S. Decennial Census

=== Racial and ethnic composition ===
Alorton village, Illinois – Racial and ethnic composition Note: the US Census treats Hispanic/Latino as an ethnic category. This table excludes Latinos from the racial categories and assigns them to a separate category. Hispanics/Latinos may be of any race.
Race / Ethnicity (NH = Non-Hispanic)	Pop 2000	Pop 2010	Pop 2020	% 2000	% 2010	% 2020
White alone (NH)	41	19	31	1.49%	0.95%	1.98%
Black or African American alone (NH)	2,660	1,951	1,452	96.76%	97.45%	92.72%
Native American or Alaska Native alone (NH)	2	1	0	0.07%	0.05%	0.00%
Asian alone (NH)	0	1	1	0.00%	0.05%	0.06%
Pacific Islander alone (NH)	0	0	0	0.00%	0.00%	0.00%
Other race alone (NH)	0	0	3	0.00%	0.00%	0.19%
Mixed race or Multiracial (NH)	26	25	64	0.95%	1.25%	4.09%
Hispanic or Latino (any race)	20	5	15	0.73%	0.25%	0.96%
Total	2,749	2,002	1,566	100.00%	100.00%	100.00%

=== 2020 census ===
As of the 2020 census, Alorton had a population of 1,566. The median age was 33.6 years. 30.6% of residents were under the age of 18 and 12.3% of residents were 65 years of age or older. For every 100 females there were 91.0 males, and for every 100 females age 18 and over there were 86.4 males age 18 and over.

100.0% of residents lived in urban areas, while 0.0% lived in rural areas.

There were 598 households in Alorton, of which 38.8% had children under the age of 18 living in them. Of all households, 15.4% were married-couple households, 23.7% were households with a male householder and no spouse or partner present, and 53.2% were households with a female householder and no spouse or partner present. About 31.1% of all households were made up of individuals and 10.6% had someone living alone who was 65 years of age or older.

There were 705 housing units, of which 15.2% were vacant. The homeowner vacancy rate was 0.4% and the rental vacancy rate was 8.4%.

=== 2000 census ===
As of the 2000 census, there were 2,749 people, 886 households, and 670 families residing in the village. The population density was 1,545.3 inhabitants per square mile (596.6/km^{2}). There were 1,000 housing units at an average density of 562.1 per square mile (217.0/km^{2}). The racial makeup of the village was 1.56% White, 97.09% African American, 0.15% Native American, 0.25% from other races, and 0.95% from two or more races. Hispanic or Latino of any race were 0.73% of the population.

There were 886 households, out of which 45.8% had children under the age of 18 living with them, 23.5% were married couples living together, 46.0% had a female householder with no husband present, and 24.3% were non-families. 19.6% of all households were made up of individuals, and 7.3% had someone living alone who was 65 years of age or older. The average household size was 3.05 and the average family size was 3.43.

In the village, the population was spread out, with 39.3% under the age of 18, 9.0% from 18 to 24, 27.8% from 25 to 44, 15.7% from 45 to 64, and 8.2% who were 65 years of age or older. The median age was 26 years. For every 100 females, there were 87.8 males. For every 100 females age 18 and over, there were 78.5 males.

The median income for a household in the village was $17,860, and the median income for a family was $19,833. Males had a median income of $21,579 versus $20,188 for females. The per capita income for the village was $8,777. About 41.3% of families and 47.3% of the population were below the poverty line, including 57.8% of those under age 18 and 26.1% of those age 65 or over.

== Government and infrastructure ==
As of 2011, the United States Postal Service operates the Alorton Post Office.

== Education ==
East St. Louis School District 189 serves Alorton.

Curtis Miller Alternative High School is located in Alorton.

Neely Elementary School was formerly located in Alorton.
