= Centreville Township, St. Clair County, Illinois =

Coordinates: 38°34′08″N 90°08′29″W

Centreville Township
- Township
- Location in St. Clair County

- St. Clair County's location in Illinois
- Country: United States
- State: Illinois
- County: St. Clair
- Established: March 5, 1910

Area
  - Total: 29.39 sq mi (76.1 km^{2})
  - Land: 27.9 sq mi (72 km^{2})
  - Water: 1.49 sq mi (3.9 km^{2}) 5.07%

Population (2010)
  - Estimate (2016): 23,947
  - Density: 909.9/sq mi (351.3/km^{2})
- Time zone: UTC-6 (CST)
  - Summer (DST): UTC-5 (CDT)
- FIPS code: 17-163-12210

Centreville Township is located in St. Clair County, Illinois. As of the 2010 census, its population was 25,386 and it contained 10,535 housing units. Centreville Township was formed from Centreville Station when it was subdivided on March 5, 1910.

== Geography ==
According to the 2010 census, the township has a total area of 29.39 square miles (76.1 km^{2}), of which 27.9 square miles (72 km^{2}) (or 94.93%) is land and 1.49 square miles (3.9 km^{2}) (or 5.07%) is water.

== Demographics ==
Historical population
Census	Pop.	Note	%±
2016 (est.)	23,947
U.S. Decennial Census
