= Washington Park, Illinois =

Washington Park
- Village
- Location of Washington Park in St. Clair County, Illinois.
- Coordinates: 38°37′34″N 90°05′40″W
- Country: United States
- State: Illinois
- County: St. Clair
- Founded: December 19, 1923

Area
  - Total: 2.55 sq mi (6.61 km^{2})
  - Land: 2.55 sq mi (6.61 km^{2})
  - Water: 0 sq mi (0.00 km^{2})
- Elevation: 423 ft (129 m)

Population (2020)
  - Total: 2,592
  - Density: 1,015.6/sq mi (392.14/km^{2})
- Time zone: UTC-6 (CST)
  - Summer (DST): UTC-5 (CDT)
- ZIP code: 62204
- Area code: 618
- FIPS code: 17-79085
- GNIS feature ID: 2400099
- Website: https://villageofwp.com/

Washington Park is a village in St. Clair County, Illinois, United States. The population was 2,592 as of the 2020 census, down from 4,196 in 2010.

== History ==
Washington Park filed for Chapter 9 bankruptcy protection in July 2009, citing assets of less than $50,000 and debt of more than $1 million. U.S. Bankruptcy Judge Pamela Pepper threw out the filing in December 2010 after finding there was no state law enabling a municipality to declare bankruptcy. Washington Park filed for bankruptcy in 2004 as well, claiming a $1.6 million debt, but that filing was dismissed when the village briefly emerged from insolvency.

In 2010, the mayor of Washington Park, John Thornton, was found to have been fatally shot; he was discovered in his car injured on the morning of April 1, and died at a hospital at 6 AM.

On July 25, 2012, the chief of police called for the disbanding of the police force.

== Geography ==
According to the 2010 census, Washington Park has a total area of 2.63 square miles (6.81 km^{2}), all land.

The city is served by Washington Park station on the St. Louis MetroLink light rail system.

== Demographics ==
Historical population
Census	Pop.	Note	%±
1920	1,516		—
1930	3,837		153.1%
1940	4,523		17.9%
1950	5,840		29.1%
1960	6,601		13.0%
1970	9,524		44.3%
1980	8,223		−13.7%
1990	7,431		−9.6%
2000	5,345		−28.1%
2010	4,196		−21.5%
2020	2,592		−38.2%
U.S. Decennial Census

=== Racial and ethnic composition ===
Washington Park village, Illinois – Racial and ethnic composition Note: the US Census treats Hispanic/Latino as an ethnic category. This table excludes Latinos from the racial categories and assigns them to a separate category. Hispanics/Latinos may be of any race.
Race / Ethnicity (NH = Non-Hispanic)	Pop 2000	Pop 2010	Pop 2020	% 2000	% 2010	% 2020
White alone (NH)	296	427	413	5.54%	10.18%	15.93%
Black or African American alone (NH)	4,899	3,599	2,017	91.66%	85.77%	77.82%
Native American or Alaska Native alone (NH)	4	7	4	0.07%	0.17%	0.15%
Asian alone (NH)	4	5	1	0.07%	0.12%	0.04%
Native Hawaiian or Pacific Islander alone (NH)	0	0	0	0.00%	0.00%	0.00%
Other race alone (NH)	2	2	10	0.04%	0.05%	0.39%
Mixed race or Multiracial (NH)	39	41	48	0.73%	0.98%	1.85%
Hispanic or Latino (any race)	101	115	99	1.89%	2.74%	3.82%
Total	5,345	4,196	2,592	100.00%	100.00%	100.00%

=== 2020 census ===
As of the 2020 census, Washington Park had a population of 2,592. The median age was 39.4 years. 16.7% of residents were under the age of 18 and 14.5% of residents were 65 years of age or older. For every 100 females there were 156.6 males, and for every 100 females age 18 and over there were 168.9 males age 18 and over.

100.0% of residents lived in urban areas, while 0.0% lived in rural areas.

There were 806 households in Washington Park, of which 24.6% had children under the age of 18 living in them. Of all households, 19.6% were married-couple households, 28.9% were households with a male householder and no spouse or partner present, and 44.0% were households with a female householder and no spouse or partner present. About 35.1% of all households were made up of individuals and 13.7% had someone living alone who was 65 years of age or older.

There were 1,003 housing units, of which 19.6% were vacant. The homeowner vacancy rate was 0.6% and the rental vacancy rate was 9.3%.

=== 2000 census ===
As of the census of 2000, there were 5,345 people, 1,692 households, and 1,218 families residing in the village. The population density was 2,180.4 inhabitants per square mile (841.9/km^{2}). There were 2,007 housing units at an average density of 818.7 per square mile (316.1/km^{2}). The racial makeup of the village was 6.06% White, 91.94% African American, 0.15% Native American, 0.13% Asian, 0.75% from other races, and 0.97% from two or more races. Hispanic or Latino of any race were 1.89% of the population.

There were 1,692 households, out of which 40.4% had children under the age of 18 living with them, 27.0% were married couples living together, 38.2% had a female householder with no husband present, and 28.0% were non-families. 23.1% of all households were made up of individuals, and 6.1% had someone living alone who was 65 years of age or older. The average household size was 3.15 and the average family size was 3.77.

In the village, the population was spread out, with 37.0% under the age of 18, 10.8% from 18 to 24, 25.2% from 25 to 44, 20.2% from 45 to 64, and 6.8% who were 65 years of age or older. The median age was 27 years. For every 100 females, there were 83.1 males. For every 100 women age 18 and over, there were 78.7 men.

The median income for a household in the village was $21,132, and the median income for a family was $23,266. Males had a median income of $30,924 versus $20,463 for females. The per capita income for the village was $8,495. About 42.6% of families and 44.8% of the population were below the poverty line, including 54.9% of those under age 18 and 33.9% of those age 65 or over.

== Education ==
Washington Park is a part of the East St. Louis School District. Avant Elementary School is located in Washington Park.

Manners Elementary School and Woodrow Wilson Elementary School were formerly located in Washington Park. Wilson opened in 1927. In July 2004 the district CEO, Stan Mims, toured Wilson and then determined that the school needed to be closed; the school closed in fall 2004 and students were transferred to three other elementary schools in the area, including Hawthorne, Nelson Mandela, and Manners.
