= Stites Township, St. Clair County, Illinois =

Coordinates: 38°39′01″N 90°09′45″W

Stites Township
- Township
- Location in St. Clair County

- St. Clair County's location in Illinois
- Country: United States
- State: Illinois
- County: St. Clair
- Established: February, 1888

Area
  - Total: 2.36 sq mi (6.1 km^{2})
  - Land: 2.11 sq mi (5.5 km^{2})
  - Water: 0.25 sq mi (0.65 km^{2}) 10.59%

Population (2010)
  - Estimate (2016): 709
  - Density: 355/sq mi (137/km^{2})
- Time zone: UTC-6 (CST)
  - Summer (DST): UTC-5 (CDT)
- FIPS code: 17-163-72741

Stites Township is located in St. Clair County, Illinois. As of the 2010 census, its population was 749 and it contained 326 housing units. Stites Township was originally named Brooklyn Township when it was reorganized from a portion of East St. Louis Township in February, 1888. Its name was changed to Stites in April, 1888.

== Geography ==
According to the 2010 census, the township has a total area of 2.36 square miles (6.1 km^{2}), of which 2.11 square miles (5.5 km^{2}) (or 89.41%) is land and 0.25 square miles (0.65 km^{2}) (or 10.59%) is water.

== Demographics ==
Historical population
Census	Pop.	Note	%±
2016 (est.)	709
U.S. Decennial Census
