= Granite City High School =

American high school in southern Illinois

Location
- 3148 Fehling Road; Granite City, Illinois 62040; United States; 38.719°N 90.124°W

Information
- Former names: Granite City Community High School
- Type: Public high school
- Established: 1921; 105 years ago
- School district: Granite City Community Unit School District 9
- Principal: Daren Depew
- Teaching staff: 97.00 (FTE)
- Grades: 9–12
- Gender: Co-educational
- Enrollment: 1,785 (2023–24)
- Student to teacher ratio: 18.40
- Colors: Red, black, and white
- Athletics conference: Southwestern Conference
- Nickname: Warriors
- Rival: Collinsville High School Edwardsville High School
- Newspaper: Granite High World
- Website: gchs.gcsd9.net

Granite City High School is a public high school in Granite City, Illinois, serves those living in Granite City, Madison, Pontoon Beach and Mitchell.

== History ==
Until 1973, Granite City was served by only one high school. In 1973, due to population projections, a new Granite City High School North was opened on Illinois Route 203 and the school in the existing building was named Granite City High School South. After only ten years, Granite City North was closed due to declining enrollment and the building sold to Belleville Area College. Granite City South resumed using the current name.

== Athletics ==
Granite City High School athletics teams are independent and do not compete in a conference. The school colors are red, black and white, and the mascot is the Warrior. Granite City offers the following sports programs:

Fall	Winter	Spring
Boys' cross-country	Boys' basketball	Boys' baseball
Girls' cross-country	Girls' basketball	Girls' soccer
Football	Girls' bowling	Girls' softball
Boys' golf	Wrestling	Boys' tennis
Girls' golf		Boys' track & field
Boys' soccer		Girls' track & field
Girls' tennis		Boys' swimming
Girls' volleyball		Boys' volleyball

=== State championships ===
- Boys' basketball
  - 1940 Illinois State Champions
- Boys' soccer
  - 1972 Illinois State Champions
  - 1976 Illinois State Champions
  - 1977 Illinois State Champions
  - 1978 Illinois State Champions
  - 1979 Illinois State Champions
  - 1980 Illinois State Champions
  - 1982 Illinois State Champions
  - 1987 Illinois State Champions
  - 1989 Illinois State Champions
  - 1990 Illinois State Champions
- Girls' soccer
  - 2011 3A Illinois State Champions

== Notable alumni ==
- Salty Parker, Major League Baseball infielder, coach and manager
- Dal Maxvill, Major League Baseball infielder
- Kevin Greene, Hall of Fame NFL defensive end and linebacker
