= Granite City Community Unit School District 9 =

School district in Illinois, United States

Address
- 3200 Maryville Road Granite City, Illinois, 62040; United States

District information
- Type: Public
- Grades: PK–12
- Schools: 9
- NCES District ID: 1717280

Students and staff
- Students: 5,747 (2025–2026)
- Teachers: 334.00 (on an FTE basis) (2025–2026)
- Staff: 288.00 (on an FTE basis) (2025–2026)
- Student–teacher ratio: 17.21 (2025–2026)

Other information
- Website: www.gcsd9.net

Granite City Community Unit School District 9 is a school district based in Granite City, Illinois, and it has currently 9 schools. The superintendent of the school district is Mr. James J. Greenwald. The Board of Education's office is located at 1947 Adams Street. The school district serves all or portions of the following cities: Granite City, Madison (far northern areas), Pontoon Beach, and Mitchell.

== Current schools ==
- Granite City High School (formerly Granite City High School - South)
- Coolidge Middle School
- Grigsby Middle School
- Prather Elementary School
- Mitchell School
- Frohardt Elementary School
- Wilson Elementary School
- Niedringhaus Elementary School
- Maryville Elementary School
- Worthen Elementary School (formerly Parkview)
- Lake Educational Support Services Center

== Former schools ==
- Webster Elementary School
- Marshall Elementary School
- Southwestern Illinois College (Granite City) (formerly Granite City High School - North)
- Logan Middle School
- Nameoki Elementary School
- McKinley Elementary School
