= Alice M. Hoffman =

Alice M. Hoffman is a personal name. Notable people with the name include:

- Alice M. Hoffman (historian)
- Alice M. Hoffman (engineer)
