= Lincoln Place =

Lincoln Place may refer to:

- Lincoln Place (Granite City), Illinois, United States
- Lincoln Place (Pittsburgh), Pennsylvania, United States
- Lincoln Place Apartment Homes, Los Angeles, California, United States
- Lincoln Place, Dublin, Ireland
