= Endicott-Johnson Shoe Distribution Plant =

Historic building in Missouri, United States

- U.S. National Register of Historic Places
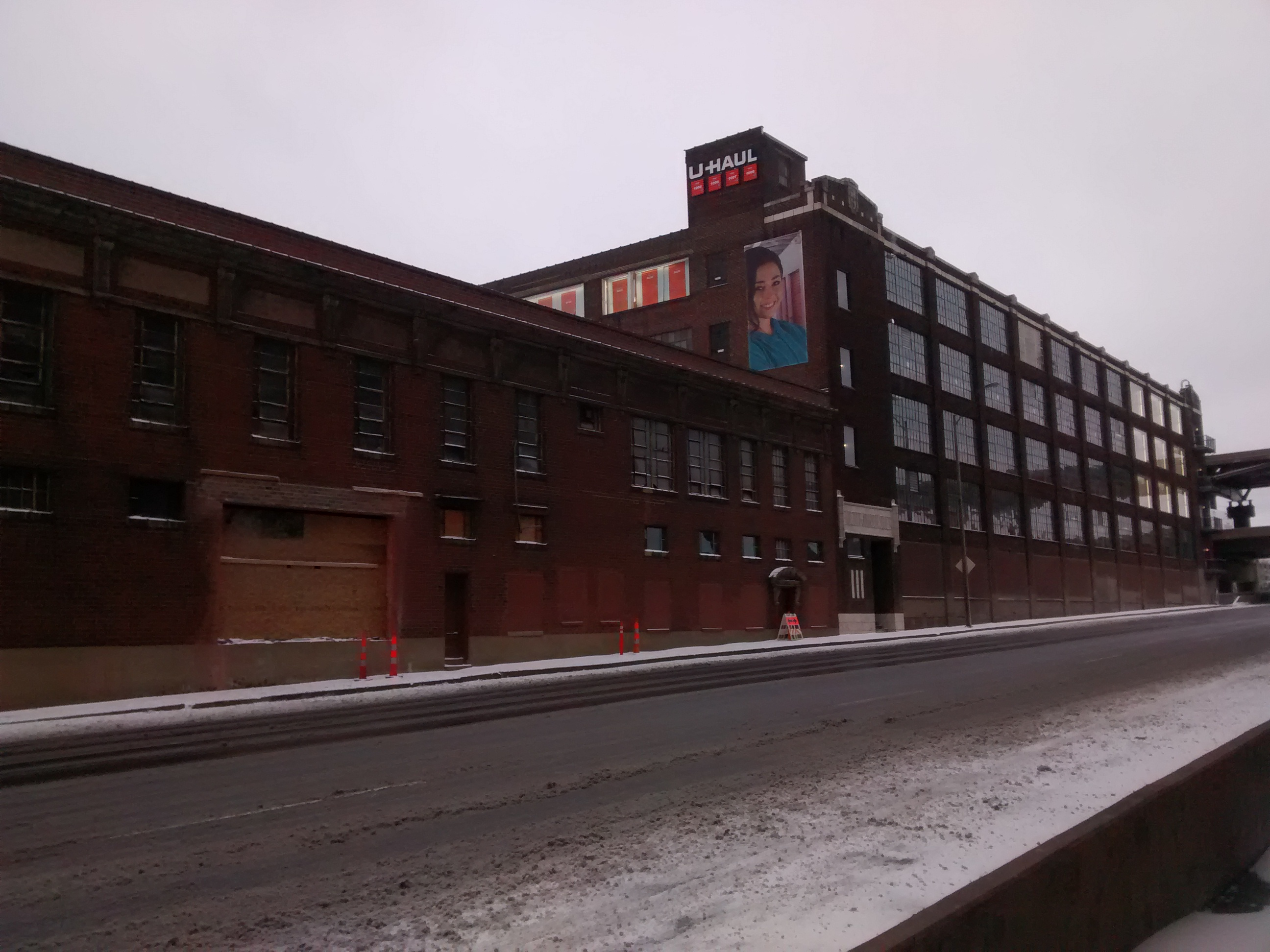

- Location within St. Louis Location within Missouri Location within the United States
- Location: 1132 Spruce St., St. Louis, Missouri
- Coordinates: 38°37′32″N 90°11′57″W
- Area: 1.5 acres (0.61 ha)
- Built: 1923
- Architects: Bonsak, Frederick; Nolte & Naumann
- Architectural style: Classical Revival, Commercial
- NRHP reference No.: 07001074
- Added to NRHP: October 11, 2007

The Endicott-Johnson Shoe Distribution Plant is a warehouse and distribution facility at 1132 Spruce Street in Downtown St. Louis, Missouri, United States. It consists of two interconnected, concrete-framed warehouses at the southeast corner of South Tucker Boulevard and Spruce Street. Frederick C. Bonsack designed the original building to the north, which is two and three stories high and was constructed in 1914–1915. To the south, Nolte and Naumann designed a six-story annex, constructed in 1923–1924. The building is on the National Register of Historic Places.

== Description ==
The Endicott-Johnson Shoe Distribution Plant is located at 1132 Spruce Street in Downtown St. Louis, Missouri, United States. Built for the Endicott Johnson Corporation, it consists of two interconnected, concrete-framed warehouses at the southeast corner of South Tucker Boulevard and Spruce Street, spanning a combined 292,000 square feet (27,100 m^{2}). Frederick C. Bonsack designed the original building, constructed in 1914–1915, and Nolte and Naumann designed the six-story annex, constructed in 1923–1924. (Note: National Park Service 2007, p. 7.1, flips the position of the original and annex buildings. The 2-to-3-story original building to the north is called the "south building", and the 6-story annex to the south is called the "north building".) The site runs 400 feet (120 m) along South Tucker Boulevard to the west, and it has a width of 152 feet (46 m) on Spruce Street to the north and the former Poplar Street to the south. The surroundings include multistory structures, such as the Robert A. Young Federal Building immediately across Tucker Boulevard to the west. Other buildings such as St. Louis City Hall, Enterprise Center, and Busch Stadium are also nearby.

The original building is rectangular and is clad with red brick, with its western elevation on Tucker Boulevard and its northern elevation on Spruce Street. The Spruce Street elevation rises three stories including a mezzanine; the site slopes upward to the south, where the original building is two stories. The windows primarily consist of steel sash windows, with terracotta windowsills and decorative jack arches. The northern elevation has seven bays, with shorter mezzanine levels and a crest with the "E-J" abbreviation. The western and eastern elevations have fifteen bays; the interior organization is visible on the eastern elevation. Both the northern and western elevations have terracotta decorations, including a string course, cornice, coping, and arches topped by keystones. Inside, the original first floor is partitioned into three sections: two storage areas (one connecting to the annex) and a lobby–storefront; this floor originally contained freight transfer platforms. The mezzanine floor has a showroom, and the top floor has offices.

The south annex has a generally rectangular footprint and is six stories tall; only the five upper stories are visible above the street. It has brick exterior walls, steel sash windows, and terracotta and concrete ornamentation. The western elevation on Tucker Boulevard has twelve bays, while the northern elevation rises asymmetrically above the original building. The southeastern corner is chamfered, with a large, two-story open bay that originally accommodated a railroad loading dock and track spur. Inside, the spur fanned out into three tracks, with a capacity of 12 railcars. The rest of the eastern elevation has eleven bays and a series of cast iron fire escapes. The interiors lack partitions and have raw finishes. A spiral chute to transport shoes, along with some shoe-processing equipment, remained in the early 21st century.

== History ==
The original building was constructed in part for the Columbia Transfer Company. In 1914, it began acquiring land at Spruce Street and 12th Street (now Tucker Boulevard) from a series of owners. Frederick Bonsack was hired that October to draw up plans for a steel-framed concrete freight transfer station with storage space and loading docks. At the time, the site was close to Terminal Railroad's large freight railyard. The Columbia Transfer Company received a construction permit for a warehouse there that December, and the building was completed by July 1915. Columbia Transfer moved to another depot in 1920.

The Endicott Johnson Corporation, a shoe manufacturer, bought the site in June 1923 with the Mercantile Trust Company as its agent. Endicott Johnson had been looking for a warehouse with rail connections and had picked the Columbia Transfer site for its proximity to the Terminal railyard. That month, Endicott Johnson announced plans for an expansion to the south. The expansion was budgeted at $1.1 million. During the annex's construction, the company occupied a distributing house on North Broadway. The structure opened in November 1924.

Due to the downturn caused by the Great Depression, Endicott-Johnson leased out some of the space in 1931 to the Browning Arms Company. Browning left the building in 1936, when Endicott-Johnson moved back into Browning's space. Endicott-Johnson continued to occupy the plant until about 1971. The building then became the warehouse store of the Globe Drug Store, a local variety store. It was added to the National Register of Historic Places in 2007. In 2024, U-Haul bought the building. The original structure became a showroom and vehicle rental office, while the annex became storage space.

== See also ==
- National Register of Historic Places in Downtown and Downtown West St. Louis

== Sources ==
- National Register of Historic Places Inventory/Nomination: Endicott-Johnson Shoe Distribution Plant (Report). National Park Service. 2007. With accompanying pictures
