= Jason Robertson (disambiguation) =

Jason Robertson (born 1999) is an American ice hockey player.

Jason Robertson may also refer to:

- Jason Robertson (activist) (1980–2003), American AIDS activist
- Jason Robertson (rugby union) (born 1994), New Zealand rugby union player
