= Illinois 203 (disambiguation) =

Illinois 203 could refer to:

- Illinois Route 203, a state highway, formerly part of Illinois Route 3 and U.S. Route 66, near St. Louis

School districts

- Elwood Community Consolidated School District 203 in Will County
- Naperville Community Unit School District 203 in DuPage County
- New Trier Township High School District 203 in Cook County
- O'Fallon Township High School District 203 in St. Clair County
- Orangeville Community Unit School District 203 in Stephenson County
- Vandalia Community Unit School District 203 in Fayette County
- Westmer Community Unit School District 203 in Mercer County
