= Mitchell Elementary School =

There are a number of elementary schools named Mitchell Elementary School:

- Mitchell Elementary School (Richmond, British Columbia)
- Mitchell Elementary School (Mitchell, Illinois)
- Mitchell Elementary School (Ann Arbor, Michigan)
