= Robert A. Young Federal Building =

Historic building in Missouri, United States

- St. Louis Mart and Terminal Warehouse
- U.S. National Register of Historic Places

- Location within St. Louis Location within Missouri Location within the United States
- Location: 1222 Spruce St., St. Louis, Missouri
- Coordinates: 38°37′27″N 90°12′02″W
- Area: less than one acre
- Architect: Preston J. Bradshaw
- Architectural style: Art Deco
- NRHP reference No.: 16000477
- Added to NRHP: July 28, 2016

The Robert A. Young Federal Building (originally the St. Louis Mart and Terminal Warehouse or Mart Building) is a 20-story federal government building at 1222 Spruce Street in downtown St. Louis, Missouri, United States. Designed by Preston J. Bradshaw in the Art Deco style, the building is L-shaped, with 25 acres (10 ha; 1,100,000 ft^{2}) of floor space. It consists of two sections: a retail mart and a shorter warehouse. The facade is made of brown bricks and white terracotta blocks. Inside, the 1st through 10th stories have federal office spaces (originally used as warehouse and exhibit space), while the upper stories are unused.

The structure was built between 1931 and 1933 for the Terminal Railroad Association. The building was acquired by the United States Army in 1941 and transferred to the General Services Administration in 1961. It was named for US Representative Robert A. Young in 1990 and is on the National Register of Historic Places.

== Description ==
The Robert A. Young Federal Building is located at 1222 Spruce Street, on the southwest corner of Spruce Street and South Tucker Boulevard in St. Louis, Missouri, United States. The building was designed by Preston J. Bradshaw. It is an L-shaped building with 25 acres (10 ha; 1,100,000 ft^{2}) of floor space, making it Downtown St. Louis's largest office structure. At 269 feet (82 m), it is also one of the city's tallest buildings. The immediate site is bounded by railroad lines and freeway ramps to the south, and there are sidewalks on the west, north, and street. The Endicott-Johnson Shoe Distribution Plant (also listed on the National Register of Historic Places) is to the north, and other buildings such as St. Louis City Hall, Enterprise Center, and Busch Stadium are also nearby.

=== Exterior ===
The structure was built with two sections: a retail mart for exhibiting and selling goods, and a warehouse served by rail lines to the south. The warehouse space extends south from the building's southwestern corner and is plain in design. The warehouse comprises the longer portion of the L and is oriented north–south; its facade is visible on the southern and western elevations, and on the set back southern portion of the eastern elevation. The mart extends a shorter distance east–west but has a greater height. The mart section includes a 20-story tower, with setbacks starting above the 10th floor. The rest of the mart was originally 7 stories high but was expanded to 10 stories in 1957.

The building's primary elevations to the north and east are decorated in the Art Deco style, with brown bricks and white terracotta blocks. The building's original entrance, on South Tucker Boulevard to the east, is marked by a gray granite doorway and topped by a large corbel. The Tucker Boulevard entrance was infilled with windows in 1987, when a more modern entrance was built on Spruce Street to the north, within an arcade of window openings.

On the rest of the mart's facade, full-height stepped pilasters delineate vertical bays, while windows on different stories are separated by spandrel panels containing abstract, geometrical patterns. At the building's northeast corner, these pilasters continue up the full height of the tower, which has an identical appearance on each of its elevations. Small-scale white terracotta blocks with acanthus motifs extend along the roofline at the north and east elevations. Both the setbacks and the tower's crown are decorated with larger-scale terracotta blocks. There are protruding terracotta draining spouts and small square medallions beneath the tower's roof, which has copper flashing and a central flagpole.

=== Interior ===
Interior staircase

Behind the original entryway, on the building's east side, is a 22-foot (6.7 m) vestibule leading to a lobby has marble walls, marble fixtures, terrazzo floors, and bronze detailing. The coffered ceiling is made of stamped metal, with color and guilloche, Vitruvian scroll, and egg and dart patterning. The lobby retains its original circular pendant light fixtures, in addition to large lamps that resemble hanging lanterns, both with frond and scroll motifs. The rear wall of the lobby is a black-and-cream marble staircase with elaborate railings. The lobby also includes a bank of elevators on its north wall, with marble surrounds.

As built, the 1st to 7th stories were used as goods marts and storage, and the 8th to 16th stories had offices. Originally, the 2nd floor had a radio studio with an auditorium. Following a 1987–1990 renovation, the 1st through 10th stories have had federal office spaces, which were rehabilitated between 1987 and 1990. The original concrete columns have mushroom-shaped cross-sections and are placed behind false walls. The modern office spaces are divided by drywall partitions. There are also raised floors above the original concrete floors, accommodating utility ducts, as well as dropped ceilings under the original ceiling slabs, accommodating air and heating ducts in the ceiling.

The tower floors were served by six passenger elevators, which also served other parts of the building, as well as nine freight elevators. By the 21st century, the 11th to 16th floors of the tower were vacant due to safety-code compliance issues. The Mart Club, located in the tower on the 17th and 18th floors, had restaurants, lounges, and roof terraces, along with conference spaces, dining rooms, locker rooms, toilets, and a kitchen. The 17th floor has exterior balconies, and the 18th story has a tile floor and fireplace, remnants of an apartment used by a US Army general during World War II. The 19th and 20th stories, as well as the rest of the 18th floor, have utility and mechanical systems.

== History ==
=== Railroad exhibition and warehouse building ===
The rear warehouse section of the building

The building was developed by the Terminal Railroad Association (TRRA). Plans for a 10-story building at the southwest corner of 12th Street (now Tucker Boulevard) and Spruce Street were first announced in 1928. The TRRA announced in 1930 that they would erect a warehouse and office building there, spanning 1,000,000 square feet (93,000 m^{2}). The site occupied a full block between Spruce, 12th, Poplar, and 13th streets. At the time, it was close to many hotels, retail and office buildings, and St. Louis Union Station. The Gamble Construction Company was selected to build the structure that December, at which point the construction project was planned to employ 1,000 people. A construction permit was granted in January 1931, and the cornerstone was ceremonially laid on July 2, 1931; by then, the building was to be completed in November 1932.

The building was ultimately completed in 1933 and was known as the St. Louis Mart and Terminal Warehouse, the St. Louis Mart Building, or the Mart for short. The Mart Building was operated by the St. Louis Mart Inc. and was intended to accommodate 100 railcars daily, serving 19 railroads in St. Louis; the firm had moved its offices into the building in September 1931. The structure displayed and sold merchandise and machinery, and it also had a large warehouse. The lowest three stories of the exhibition space was devoted to the building industry, and another full floor was devoted to railroad equipment and machinery. Radio station KMOX occupied the second and third floors. In its early years, the Mart Building hosted events such as the St. Louis Auto Show, which was first hosted there in February 1932.

=== US government building ===
==== US Army use ====
The building was acquired by the United States Army in June 1941 for $2.3 million, after the Army Quartermaster Corps moved into the warehouse. The structure became the United States Army Support Center or Building 40, the Army's largest supply depot, surpassing the Brooklyn Army Terminal in New York. KMOX was the only office tenant allowed to stay in the building, and a radio transmitter atop the building was authorized in September 1941. The 90 other tenants were forced to leave that October when the Army formally moved in. The US government contemplated expanding the seven-story warehouse section by three stories, adding another 300,000 square feet (28,000 m^{2}) of floor area, in 1942.

During World War II, the building was used as a dispensary for wounded soldiers passing through Union Station, becoming the world's largest medical dispensary by 1943. It also functioned as a medical depot, handling X-ray equipment and medicine, which could be shipped by the carload. After the war ended, the building continued to be used as a medical depot. The Army announced plans in 1950 to move its medical laboratory to the building from Fort Sheridan, and the Army began renovating the building that October, demolishing an adjacent warehouse. By mid-decade the Hoover Commission had determined that the building had $250,000 in deferred maintenance needs. The Army completed a three-story addition, extending west and south of the tower, in 1957. The next year, the Army proposed adding a heliport to serve soldiers traveling to and from St. Louis Lambert International Airport, receiving a permit for the heliport that August. The Army also proposed adding new elevators and air-conditioning systems.

==== Office building ====
Exterior view from ground level

The Mart Building was transferred to the General Services Administration (GSA) in 1961. During that time, the building housed the Aviation Materiel Command (later Aviation Systems Command, or AVSCOM); the department had 3,000 employees working at the Mart Building, which was called the "St. Louis Pentagon". Following a failed proposal to relocate AVSCOM outside of St. Louis in 1974, federal officials proposed relocating it to another building in the city, citing the high costs of renovating the Mart Building. This relocation was approved in late 1976. Given the estimated renovation costs of $18.25 million, the GSA was contemplating selling the Mart Building in 1977. After the relocation of AVSCOM that year Mayor James Conway appointed two officials to study possible future uses for the building; city alderman Bruce Sommer proposed reusing it as a low-security prison.

The GSA ultimately retained ownership of the Mart Building, which by the mid-1980s included the United States Army Corps of Engineers and the United States Coast Guard. The United States House of Representatives approved $60.8 million for the Mart Building's renovation in 1985, and the next year the GSA hired two firms to design the renovation. By then, the building accommodated 1,300 employees. A major interior renovation commenced in 1987. During the renovation, in 1988, the United States Congress voted to rename the building for former US Representative Robert A. Young, who had helped raise money for the renovation. The renovation, which involved the lowest ten floors, was rededicated in Young's honor when it was completed in November 1990. Security at the building was increased following the Oklahoma City bombing in 1995.

By the 2000s, the building's lower floors hosted the Equal Employment Opportunity Commission, Immigration and Naturalization Service, Internal Revenue Service, and other US federal agencies, and about 2,500 people worked there. The building was placed on the National Register of Historic Places in 2016. Following concerns that the structure was vulnerable to damage because of its proximity to the New Madrid seismic zone, the Robert A. Young Building underwent a $62 million seismic retrofitting project starting in 2016. The project involved closing the floors in stages, allowing shear walls and steel bracing to be installed throughout the structure. New mechanical, electrical, and plumbing and fire protection systems were also installed; this work was finished in 2019. The federal government was considering selling the building by 2025.

== See also ==
- List of tallest buildings in St. Louis
- National Register of Historic Places in Downtown and Downtown West St. Louis

== Sources ==
- National Register of Historic Places Inventory/Nomination: St. Louis Mart and Terminal Warehouse (Report). National Park Service. 2016. With accompanying pictures
