= Anna Stonum =

American disability rights activist

- Anna Stonum, from the 1975 yearbook of North High School, Granite City
- Born: Anna Marie Stonum; October 14, 1958; Granite City, Illinois
- Died: February 6, 1999 (age 40); Chicago, Illinois
- Occupations: Artist, disability rights activist

Anna Marie Stonum (October 14, 1958 – February 6, 1999) was an American artist and disability rights activist based in Chicago.

== Early life and education ==
Stonum was from Granite City, Illinois, the daughter of Robert Stonum and Julia Sedej Stonum. Her father worked at a steel mill and was mayor of Glen Carbon, Illinois; her mother worked at a Granite City Army Depot. Stonum was a Girl Scout, in her mother's Brownie troop. She attended Granite City's North High School, and earned a Bachelor of Fine Arts degree (BFA) at Mundelein College in Chicago.

== Career ==
Stonum was a founding member of the Chicago chapter of ADAPT, a disability rights organization then known as American Disabled for Accessible Public Transit. She was on the board of the Disability Arts and Culture Center at the University of Illinois, and served on the boards of several advocacy organizations. She helped to lead protests against the MDA Telethon hosted by Jerry Lewis. In 1988, she was part of a group of American disability activists who visited Cuba and met Fidel Castro.

In 1994, Stonum and two other activists sued the Chicago Cubs for the inaccessibility of the wheelchair seating area at Wrigley Field. The suit was settled in 1996, with the Chicago Cubs agreeing to increase the number and accessibility of wheelchair seating spaces, parking, restrooms, and concessions at the ballpark.

Stonum owned and ran a graphic design company, Design for All. Her t-shirt design featuring an evolutionary diagram with the caption "Adapt or Perish" is part of the National Museum of American History's collections on the disability rights movement. The same graphic by Stonum was featured in the 2018 show "Chicago Disability Activism, Arts, and Design: 1970s to Today" at the University of Illinois Chicago.

== Personal life ==
Stonum had Friedreich's ataxia, a degenerative neuromuscular condition, and used a wheelchair in adulthood. She married fellow activist Mike Ervin in 1987. Artist Riva Lehrer painted "Mike & Anna", a portrait of Ervin and Stonum, in 1998. Stonum died in 1999, at the age of 40, in Chicago.
