= Madison Junior High School =

Madison Junior High School may refer to:

- Madison Junior High School in North Platte, Nebraska.
- Madison Junior High School in Naperville, Illinois, part of Naperville Community Unit School District 203.
- Madison Junior High School in Mansfield, Ohio.
- Madison Area Junior High School in Madison, Maine.
- Madison Junior High School in Rexburg, Idaho
