= Illinois Route 203 =

State highway in southwestern Illinois, US

Illinois Route 203
- Nameoki Road
- IL 203 highlighted in red

Route information
- Maintained by IDOT
- Length: 9.51 mi (15.30 km)
- Existed: 1964–present

Major junctions
- South end: Collinsville Road in Fairmont City
- I-55 / I-70 / US 40 in Fairmont City
- North end: I-270 in Granite City

Location
- Country: United States
- State: Illinois
- Counties: St. Clair, Madison

Highway system
- Illinois State Highway System; Interstate; US; State; Tollways; Scenic
← IL 192	→ IL 242

Illinois Route 203 (IL 203) is a 9.51-mile-long (15.30 km) north–south state highway in the southwestern part of the U.S. state of Illinois. It travels from just south of I-55/I-70/US 40 around Gateway International Raceway at Collinsville Road (former US 40) in Fairmont City, north to I-270 near Pontoon Beach. IL 203 is a former segment of US 66.

== Route description ==
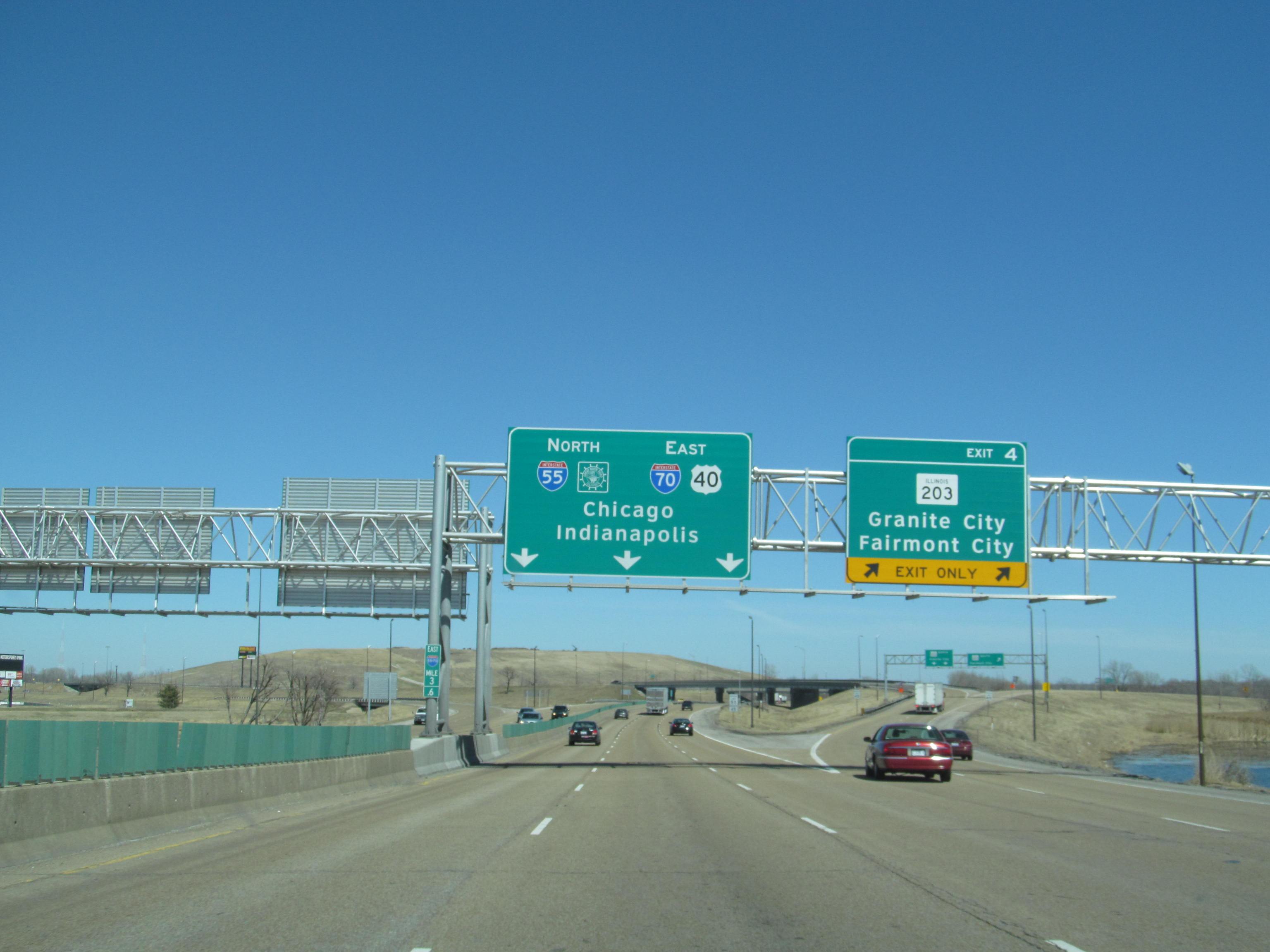
Exit for IL 203 off of I-70 and I-55

IL 203 is a major north–south artery through the eastern part of the Greater St. Louis metropolitan area.

== History ==
By 1937, US 67 was signed on part of present-day IL 203. From 1938 to 1955, US 66 City was signed on this particular route as well. By 1939, US 67 Alternate was signed after US 67 was rerouted away from East St. Louis. Up until 1964, parts of IL 3, IL 162, and US 67 Alternate utilized present-day IL 203. In 1964, IL 203 was signed; replacing these routes. It originally traveled to Hartford, but this was later trimmed back to I-270 as of 1989.

== Major intersections ==
County	Location	mi	km	Destinations	Notes
St. Clair	Fairmont City	0.0	0.0	Collinsville Road	Southern terminus
St. Clair	Fairmont City	0.3	0.48	I-55 / I-70 / US 40 – Chicago, St. Louis	Exit 4 (I-70/I-55)
Madison	Granite City	5.0	8.0	IL 162 east (Edwardsville Road)	Western terminus of IL 162
Madison	Mitchell	9.5	15.3	I-270 / Historic US 66 – Effingham, St. Charles	Northern terminus
1.000 mi = 1.609 km; 1.000 km = 0.621 mi
