= Port Harbor Railroad =

Overview
- Headquarters: Granite City, Illinois
- Reporting mark: PHRR, RRC
- Locale: Illinois

Technical
- Track gauge: 4 ft 8 1/2 in (1,435 mm) standard gauge
- Length: 5.2 miles (8.4 km)

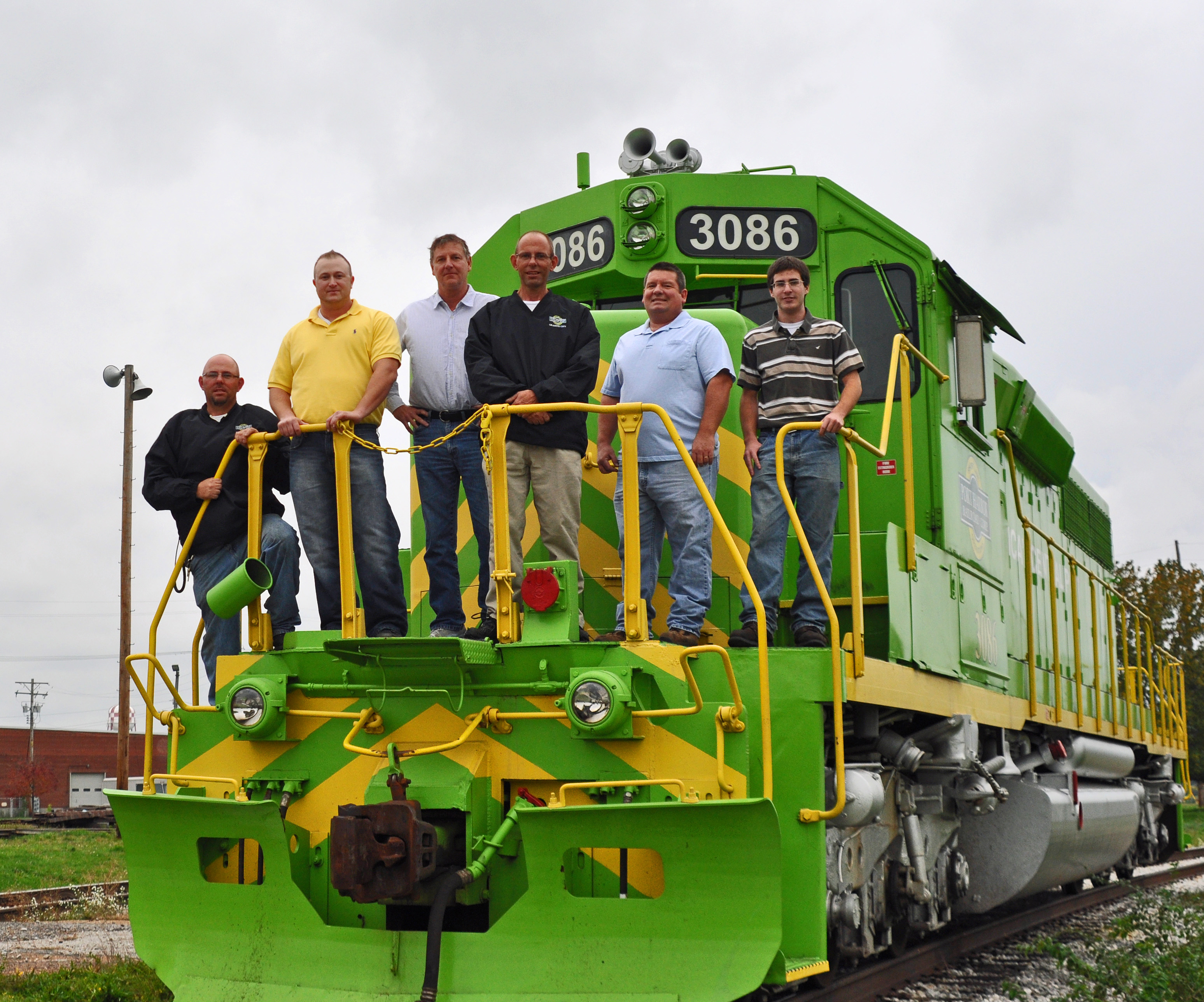
Port Harbor Railroad crew members posing on unit #3086, an SD40-2 diesel electric locomotive built by the Electro Motive Division of General Motors.

The Port Harbor Railroad (reporting mark PHRR) is a short-line railroad in Granite City, Illinois, serving an industrial port district known as America's Central Port. PHRR began operations in 2004 as a subsidiary of the Respondek Railroad and connects with the Terminal Railroad Association of St. Louis at "WR Tower," a major railroad junction in Granite City. PHRR transports everything from steel and aluminum products to foods, lumber, paper, chemicals, minerals, grains and other products. The railroad is classified as a Class III Common Carrier.

PHRR serves several industrial businesses in Granite City, including:

- Mattingly Lumber
- Abengoa
- APC Transload
- Rivers Edge Chemicals
- Airgas

== Motive power ==
The motive power roster for the PHRR consists of 10 EMD locomotives, two of which have a notable history. Unit #1800, a rebuilt EMD GP8, formerly served on the Alaska Railroad and starred as the third unit in the 1986 movie Runaway Train (film). And, while not as famous as the #1800, unit #2064 did briefly appear in the Jason Aldean music video for Fly Over States. The newest locomotives on PHRR's roster are two GP40's and a GP9/Slug set and a SW1200RS that were purchased from the Canadian Pacific Railroad and arrived between July and August 2013.

- Respondek SW9 #14 originally Florida East Coast 227
- Respondek SD40-2 #1000 originally C&NW 6813 (Sould to Cincinnati Eastern)
- Respondek Slug #1015. Slug converted from Canadian Pacific SW7 #6713.
- Respondek GP9m #1602, Arrived mated to Slug 1015.
- Respondek GP8 #1800 ex Alaska Railroad 1801
- Respondek SW1200 #1239 ex-TRRA
- Respondek GP40 #2064 ex CP (SOO).
- Respondek SD40-2 #3086 originally C&NW 6923 (Sold to Cincinnati Eastern))
- Respondek GP40 #4615 ex CP (SOO) originally MILW 2035 (in service in full CP Paint, to be re-lettered in 2014)
- Respondek SW1200RS #8166. Ex-Canadian Pacific 8166. (stored serviceable)
