= James D. Holloway =

American politician (1931–2011)

Member of the Illinois House of Representatives

Personal details
- Born: September 8, 1931 Granite City, Illinois, U.S.
- Died: August 20, 2011 (aged 79) Chester, Illinois, U.S.
- Party: Democratic

James Donald Holloway (September 8, 1931 – August 20, 2011) was an American politician who served as a member of the Illinois House of Representatives.

Holloway died on August 20, 2011, in Chester, Illinois at the age of 79.
