= Mitchell, Illinois =

- Census-designated place
- Location within Illinois Location within the United States
- Coordinates: 38°45′47″N 90°04′54″W
- Country: United States
- State: Illinois
- County: Madison
- Township: Chouteau
- Settled: 1870

Area
  - Total: 0.559 sq mi (1.45 km^{2})
  - Land: 0.559 sq mi (1.45 km^{2})
  - Water: 0 sq mi (0 km^{2})
- Elevation: 427 ft (130 m)

Population (2020)
  - Total: 1,217
  - Density: 2,180/sq mi (841/km^{2})
- Time zone: UTC-6 (CST)
  - Summer (DST): UTC-5 (CDT)
- ZIP Code: 62040
- Area code: 618
- GNIS feature ID: 2629853

Mitchell is an unincorporated community and census-designated place (CDP) in Madison County, Illinois, United States. As of the 2020 census, its population was 1,217. It is part of the Metro East region of greater St. Louis.

== History ==
Two brothers from Chicago, John Jay and William H. Mitchell, settled in the area in 1870 and bought about 4,000 acres (1,600 ha) of Mississippi River bottomland, which they drained to operate a cattle ranch. When the Chicago and Alton Railroad built its line from Alton toward East St. Louis, John Mitchell promoted the railroad and established a stop he named for himself, Mitchell Station. The Wabash and other lines soon laid tracks through the area, and Mitchell grew as a rail junction.

When U.S. Route 66 was commissioned in 1926, it ran through Mitchell along the corridor now followed by Illinois Route 203. The Luna Cafe, built in 1924, became a well-known stop on the highway and remains in business; its neon sign, later restored with help from the Friends of the Mother Road, is a local landmark. According to local legend the cafe also housed a Prohibition-era gambling room and an upstairs brothel and drew visits from the gangster Al Capone, although these stories are undocumented.

== Geography ==
Mitchell is located in western Madison County at the junction of Interstate 270 and Illinois Route 203, part of former U.S. Route 66, approximately thirteen miles (21 km) northeast of downtown St. Louis. It is bordered to the south and east by Pontoon Beach, to the northeast by Edwardsville, and to the northwest by the unincorporated community of Brooks. Granite City is 6 miles (10 km) to the southwest via IL 203. A few years ago, Mitchell tried to become an independent city, but that vote was never allowed because of court challenges from nearby communities.

According to the U.S. Census Bureau, the Mitchell CDP has an area of 0.56 square miles (1.45 km^{2}), all land. The community sits on the Mississippi River floodplain, known in the region as American Bottom.

The lone school in the town is Mitchell Elementary School. Near town to the east is the Gateway Commercial Business Center, a place of trucking companies and more. Also located in Mitchell is the Luna Cafe, a historic landmark along old Route 66.

== Demographics ==
=== 2020 census ===
As of the 2020 census, Mitchell had a population of 1,217. The median age was 45.9 years. 18.3% of residents were under the age of 18 and 19.8% of residents were 65 years of age or older. For every 100 females there were 91.1 males, and for every 100 females age 18 and over there were 87.2 males age 18 and over.

100.0% of residents lived in urban areas, while 0.0% lived in rural areas.

There were 502 households in Mitchell, of which 27.7% had children under the age of 18 living in them. Of all households, 49.8% were married-couple households, 19.3% were households with a male householder and no spouse or partner present, and 25.3% were households with a female householder and no spouse or partner present. About 27.4% of all households were made up of individuals and 11.8% had someone living alone who was 65 years of age or older.

There were 539 housing units, of which 6.9% were vacant. The homeowner vacancy rate was 3.4% and the rental vacancy rate was 3.7%.

Racial composition as of the 2020 census
Race	Number	Percent
White	1,074	88.2%
Black or African American	28	2.3%
American Indian and Alaska Native	4	0.3%
Asian	15	1.2%
Native Hawaiian and Other Pacific Islander	1	0.1%
Some other race	20	1.6%
Two or more races	75	6.2%
Hispanic or Latino (of any race)	53	4.4%

== Education ==
The community is in the Granite City Community Unit School District 9.
