= Alice M. Hoffman (engineer) =

American civil engineer and businesswoman

Alice M. Hoffman in 2026

Alice Minnette Hoffman (born December 1960) is an American civil and structural engineer, business executive and writer known for her work in the planning, design and construction of two National Football League stadiums and other large projects.

A native of Illinois, Hoffman earned her bachelor's and master's degrees in engineering at MIT. After working for Parsons Brinckerhoff and other organizations, she managed the design and construction of Ravens Stadium in Baltimore, Maryland, which opened in 1998. Over the next four years, she oversaw the design and reconstruction of Soldier Field stadium in Chicago. After this, Hoffman worked on such projects as the O'Hare International Airport expansion, a public transit development project in Baltimore and the site plan for the 2016 Chicago bid to the United States Olympic & Paralympic Committee.

Since 2005 she has owned and operated a ranch in Patagonia, Chile. She is the author of a 2026 book that describes her experiences in South America: A Love Letter to Chilean Patagonia: Adventures in Off-Grid Living, Fly Fishing, Exploration and Conservation.

== Early life and education ==
Hoffman was born in 1960 in Granite City, Illinois, to Walter and Vivian Hoffman. The family moved to Arizona when she was in the third grade, where both of her parents died of cancer before her 14th birthday. Hoffman earned bachelor's and master's degrees in civil and environmental engineering at Massachusetts Institute of Technology (MIT) in 1982 and 1983, respectively, with a concentration in construction management at MIT's Sloan School of Management.

== Career ==
=== Early career ===
In 1981, while still at MIT, Hoffman performed a comparative analysis of nuclear reactors for survival in the event of aircraft impacts and hydrogen explosions inside containment buildings for the U.S. Nuclear Regulatory Commission. After graduating, she worked overseeing projects in Massachusetts for New England Telephone. She was an assistant project manager at Parsons Brinckerhoff from 1983 to 1986 coordinating the preparation of environmental impact statements for waste to energy plants in NYC and with the teams designing nuclear submarine construction facilities in Virginia and 9 miles of bridges on the New Jersey Turnpike.

From 1986 to 1992, Hoffman managed the design and construction of hospital and mental health facility projects for the New York State Facilities Development Corp., including New York Psychiatric Institute in Manhattan. After this, Hoffman was a principal of Company Entiér (originally Baltimore Systems Group), a management consulting firm in Baltimore, Maryland, where she developed and implemented an engineering approach to business management for clients such as the U.S. Federal Reserve and clients such as Toyota.

=== NFL stadiums ===
From 1995 to 1998, Hoffman was the project manager, supervising the planning, design and construction of Ravens Stadium in Baltimore for the Maryland Stadium Authority (MSA). In 1997, Hoffman obtained funding from Maryland to implement a novel bioswale to mitigate runoff from the stadium parking lots, working together with students and their science teacher, Evelyn Walls, from Baltimore's public Francis Scott Key Elementary/Middle School, for which the students won a prize. At the end of the stadium project, the MSA's executive director said that Hoffman "did an excellent job of taking a very difficult task – of designing a facility of that size with the time and budget constraints that we were under". The Washington Post quoted uniformly positive reactions to the stadium. After the project ended, Hoffman gave the keynote address at the National Construction Technology Conference in October 1998 in Baltimore organized by the National Center for Construction Education and Research, a joint initiative of the U.S. Department of Labor and the U.S. Department of Education. The stadium won the 1999 ACI Maryland Chapter Award of Excellence (Concrete Structure). The same year, Hoffman was named one of Maryland's top 100 women "who are making an impact through their leadership, community service and mentoring" and formed the consulting firm Hoffman Management Partners (HMP).

Hoffman at the 2003 rededication plaque at Soldier Field identifying HMP as the project manager

From 1999 to 2003 HMP acted as developer's representative for the Chicago Bears, managing the project to rebuild a modern stadium at Soldier Field, while preserving the historic and memorial portions of the preexisting building. Hoffman consulted on and supervised the entire process, from financing and site selection to design and construction of the $681 million project. The project opened in September 2003 after the shortest construction timeframe for any NFL stadium. Despite extensive changes required by the Bears and the City of Chicago and remediation of underground contamination, the project was completed within 8% of the allotted budget, with the $49 million in cost overruns borne by the Bears. Hoffman's team's role in the completion of the new stadium won praise from construction associations and publications, civic organizations and environmental groups, such as Architectural Record; Midwest Construction magazine (winning its Overall Project of the Year, 2003); The Chicago Building Congress (Merit Award for New Construction in Chicago, 2004); The Friends of Downtown (Best Open Space Project Award, 2004); Building Design & Construction magazine (Building Team of the Year, Grand Award, 2004); Green Roofs for Healthy Cities (Award of Excellence, 2004); American Institute of Steel Construction; Illinois Engineering Council (Outstanding Engineering Achievement Award, 2004); and Arbor Day Foundation (Building with Trees Award of Excellence, 2004).

Meanwhile, from 2001 to 2002 Hoffman managed the concept development for a new football stadium for the U.S. Naval Academy in Annapolis.

=== O'Hare Airport expansion and later projects ===
From 2003 to 2010 Hoffman was Program Management Consultant for a $6.5 billion O'Hare International Airport expansion. In 2004 HMP managed Chicago's citywide disaster preparedness plan for biological attack, preparing diagrams for temporary physical measures needed to turn 104 Chicago buildings into secure medication distribution sites for the public. Over the next two years, she served as program manager for a sustainable $1.5 billion public transit development in Baltimore, Maryland. She also worked with Seventh Generation Renewables and Bergey Wind Power to develop wind and solar power installations in remote areas of Chile. HMP is a certified Bergey wind turbine dealer.

Hoffman developed the site plan for the 2016 Chicago bid to the United States Olympic & Paralympic Committee, which proposed building the competition venues, "celebration center" and the Olympic Village on Chicago's lakefront and completing parts of the 1909 Burnham Plan of Chicago. Bob Ctvrtlik of the U.S. Olympic Committee said that the bid succeeded partly by capitalizing on the scenic lakefront and the Burnham project proposals.

== Publications ==
- MIT masters' thesis, which explores the environmental, technical and financial reasons for the largest bond default in United States history (1983)
- "An Archeoastronomical Investigation: Does a Constellation Pattern Appear in Rapa Nui Rock Art?" (2000) describes an expedition from the University of Iowa to Easter Island and its investigation of pock marks in a boulder that may depict the constellation Sagittarius, which would have been rising when it was time to plant crops.

Hoffman near her ranch in Patagonia, with a view of Cerro Castillo

- A Love Letter to Chilean Patagonia: Adventures in Off-Grid Living, Fly Fishing, Exploration and Conservation, New York Publishing Labs: New York City (October 2026). ISBN 979-8-953560-20-7

== Personal life and volunteering ==
Hoffman lives in Chicago with her partner Lee. As a LEED Accredited Professional Hoffman has focused on environmentally responsible construction practices and efficient use of resources.

From 1994 to 1998, Hoffman volunteered as a diver and educator with the Baltimore Aquarium and participated in its Project Reef Spawn on its expedition to Roatán, diving with scientists in the Caribbean Sea and Gulf of Mexico to collect scientific data, an effort that determined that many corals release sperm and egg cells on the same day/night each year. She served as a board member of the National Space Society from 2016 to 2019, and served as the board's president in 2018 and 2019, focusing on education and establishing its legacy giving society. She was also the project manager of its Enterprise in Space program to coordinate space veterans with STEAM students from around the world to work with an AI tool and design experiments to be launched into orbit in a 3D-printed spacecraft. She is president of the Soldier Field Foundation.

From 2005 to 2026, Hoffman shared her time between Chicago and Patagonia, Chile, where she owned and operated a ranch that raised brown trout, alpacas and llamas, and operated off the grid using renewable energy. She enjoys fly-fishing, diving, sailing and biking.
