= Terminal Railroad Association of St. Louis =

Switching and terminal railroad in the US

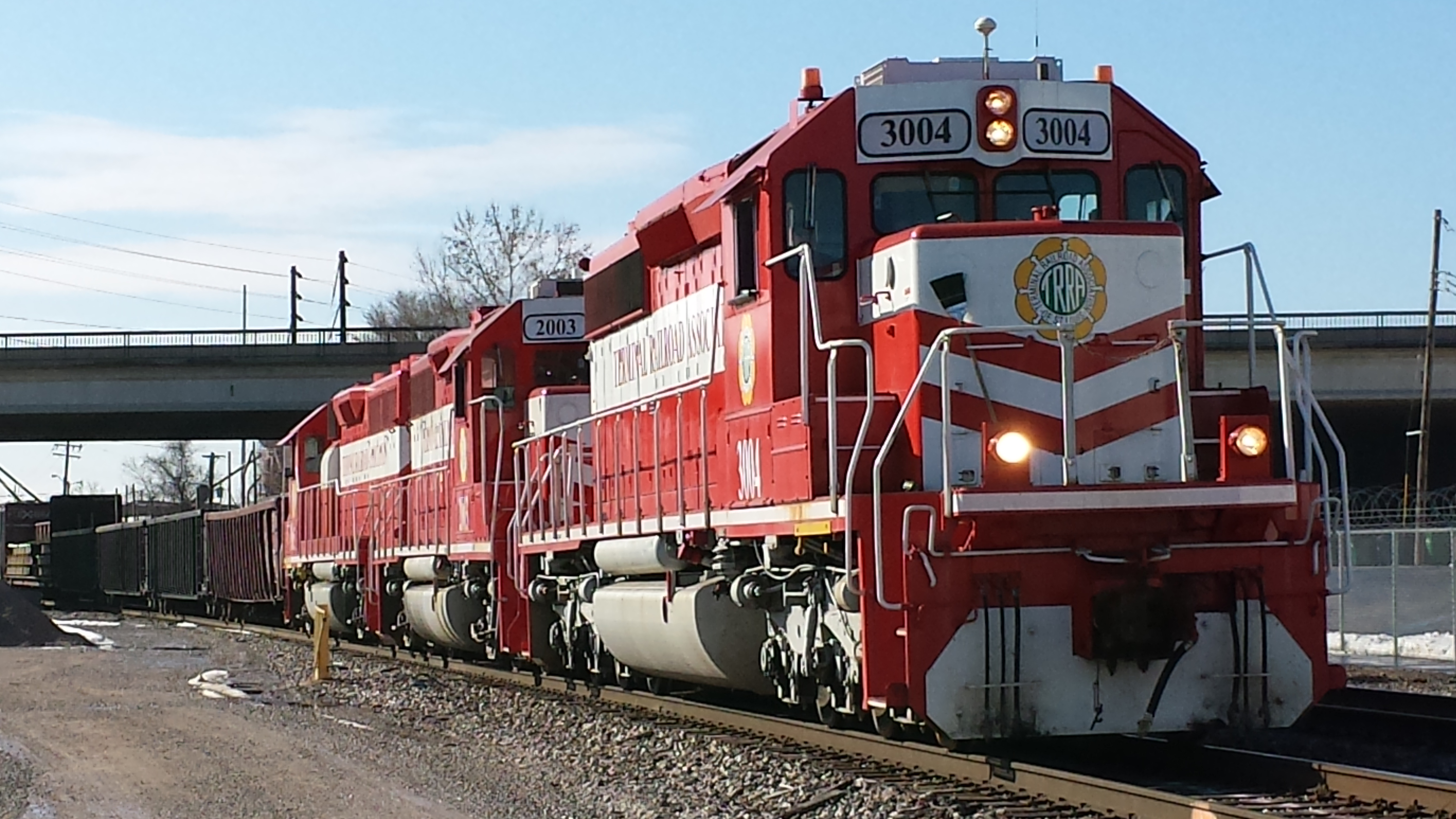
- A TRRA locomotive

Overview
- Headquarters: St. Louis
- Reporting mark: TRRA
- Locale: Illinois and Missouri
- Dates of operation: 1889–present

Technical
- Track gauge: 4 ft 8 1/2 in (1,435 mm) standard gauge

Other
- Website: terminalrailroad.com

The Terminal Railroad Association of St. Louis (reporting mark TRRA) is a Class III switching and terminal railroad that handles traffic in the St. Louis metropolitan area. It is co-owned by five of the six Class I railroads that reach the city.

== Present operation ==
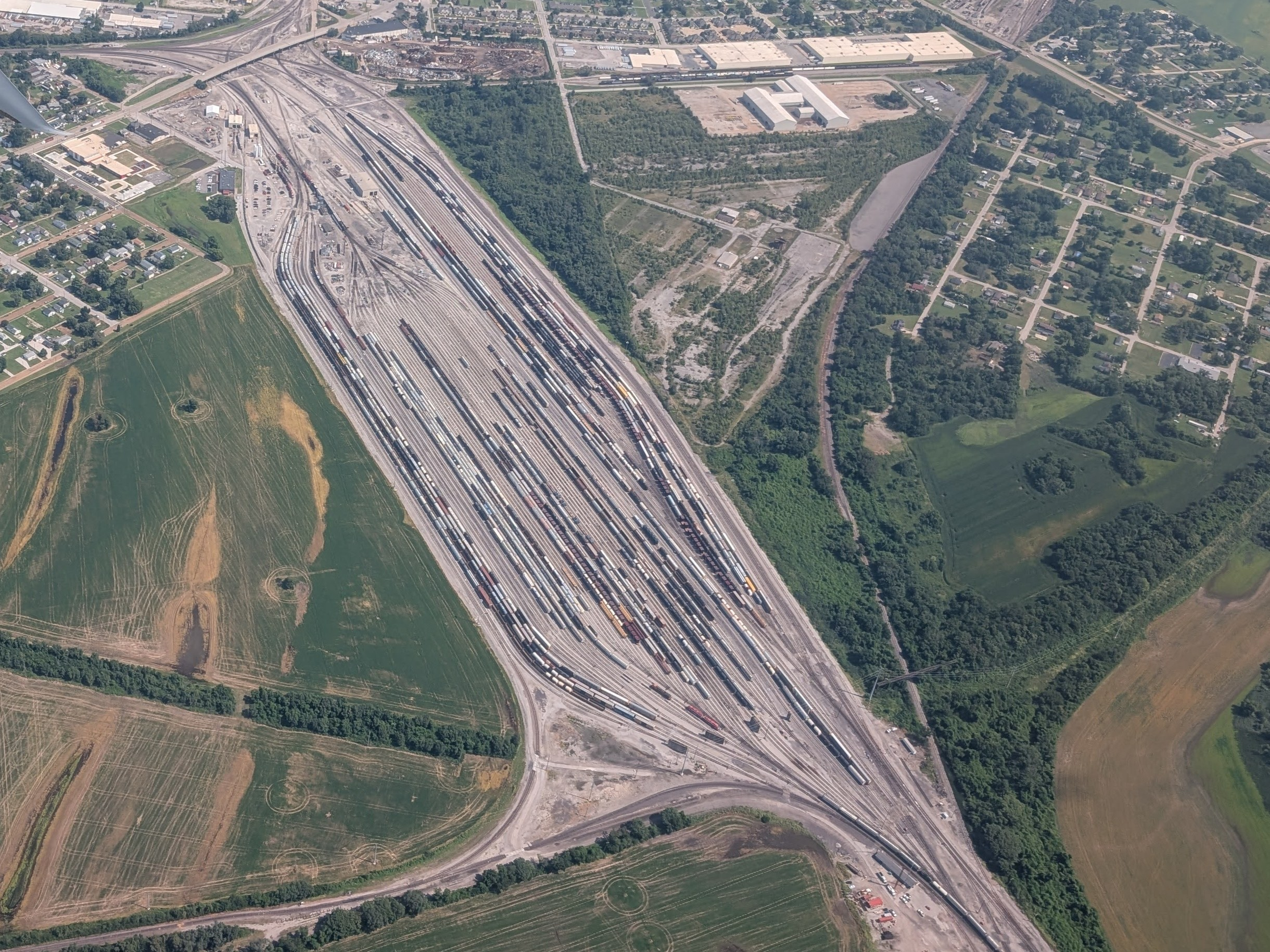
TRRA-owned Madison Yard

The Terminal Railroad Association is owned by BNSF Railway, Canadian National Railway (Illinois Central Railroad until 1999), CSX Transportation, Norfolk Southern Railway, and Union Pacific Railroad. All own one-seventh of the railroad except UP, which owns three-sevenths.

The Terminal Railroad also connects with the Canadian Pacific Kansas City.

The TRRA owns and operates the MacArthur and Merchants bridges, the two Mississippi River railroad crossings in the St. Louis metropolitan area. In 2022, the TRRA completed a $222 million rebuild of the 1889 Merchants Bridge. In the same year, the TRRA began a $57.3 million renovation of the MacArthur Bridge that includes replacing the 1912 main span girders and rebuilding the Broadway truss in downtown St. Louis.

The Association also owns and operates Madison Yard, the largest classification yard in the St. Louis region. The yard consists of 80 inbound, outbound, and holding tracks with a capacity of 2,200 cars. As of 2022, the company planned an expansion that would enable Madison Yard to hold another 1,500 railcars, bringing the total to 4,000.

The railroad operates 30 locomotives to move cars around the yard, deliver cars to local industries, and prepare trains for departure.

== History ==
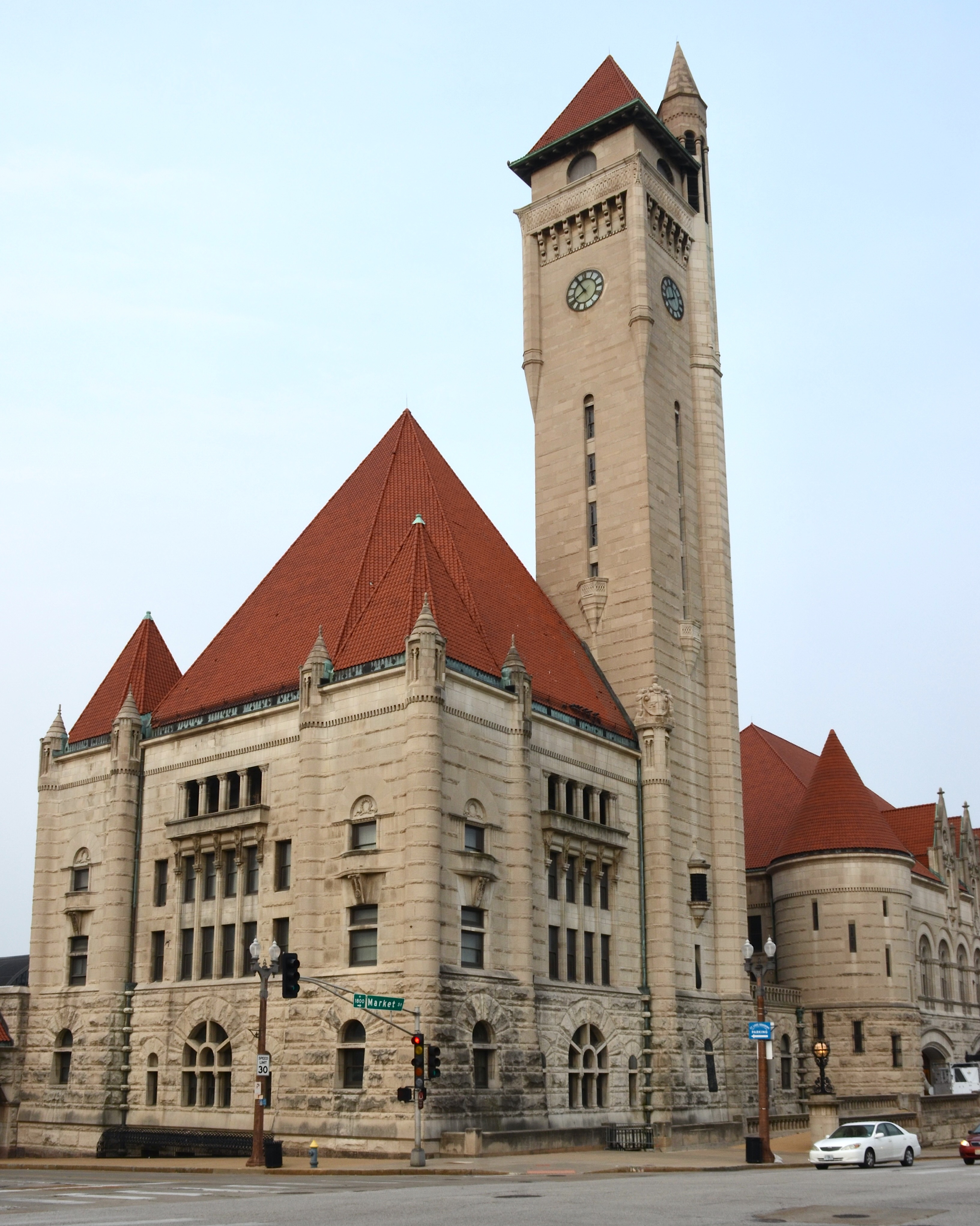
Historic St. Louis Union Station

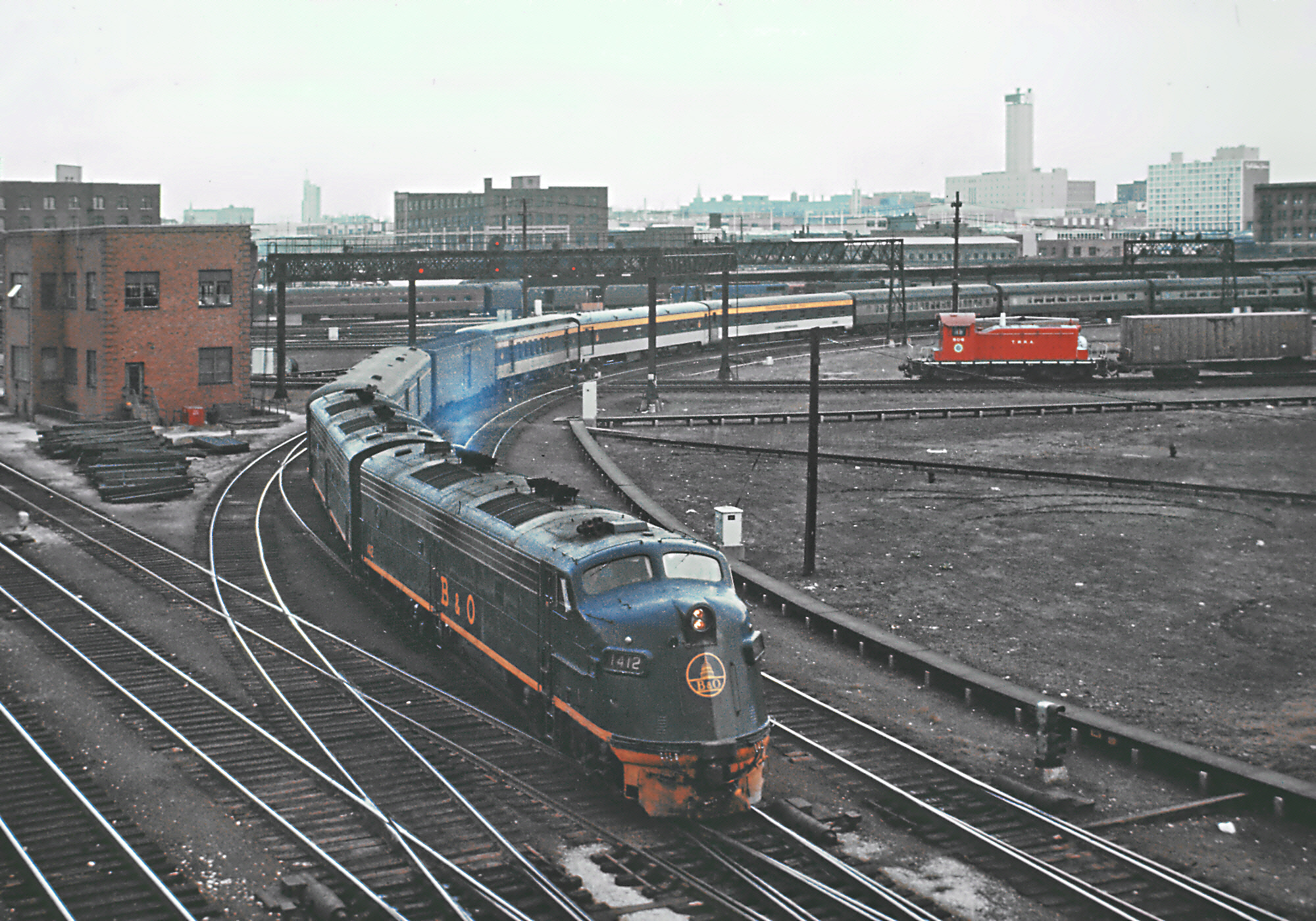
An eastbound George Washington, leaving St. Louis sometime in 1967. A TRRA locomotive is in the background.

=== Wiggins Ferry Company ===
The railroad's predecessor companies in St. Louis date to 1797, when the town was still part of Spanish Upper Louisiana. James Piggott was granted a license to operate a ferry between St. Louis and Illinoistown (now East St. Louis, Illinois). In 1819, Piggott's heirs sold the ferry to Samuel Wiggins, who operated the service with eight horses until a steam-powered ferry took over in 1828.

In 1832, Wiggins sold the Wiggins Ferry Service and 800 acres (3.2 km^{2}) of land in East St. Louis, including Bloody Island, to new owners, who began developing a rail yard on the Illinois property. In 1870, the ferry began porting rail cars across the river one car at a time until the 1874 completion of the Eads Bridge.

When the Terminal Railroad was incorporated in 1889, railroads owned most of the Wiggins Ferry property. In 1902 when the Rock Island Line joined the Terminal Railroad, the ownership of the Wiggins Illinois property was complete.

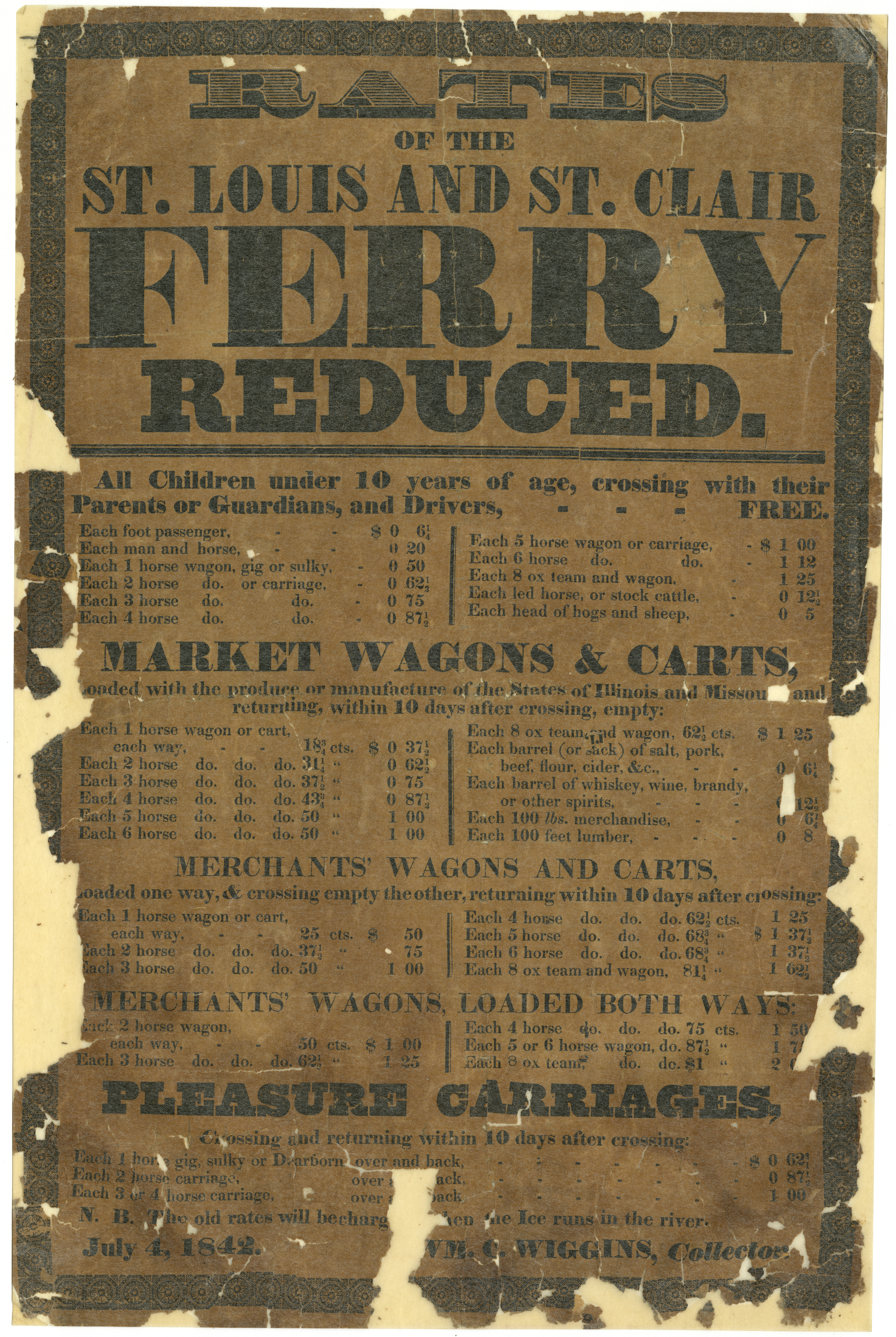
Advertisement for the St. Louis and St. Clair Ferry, July 4, 1842

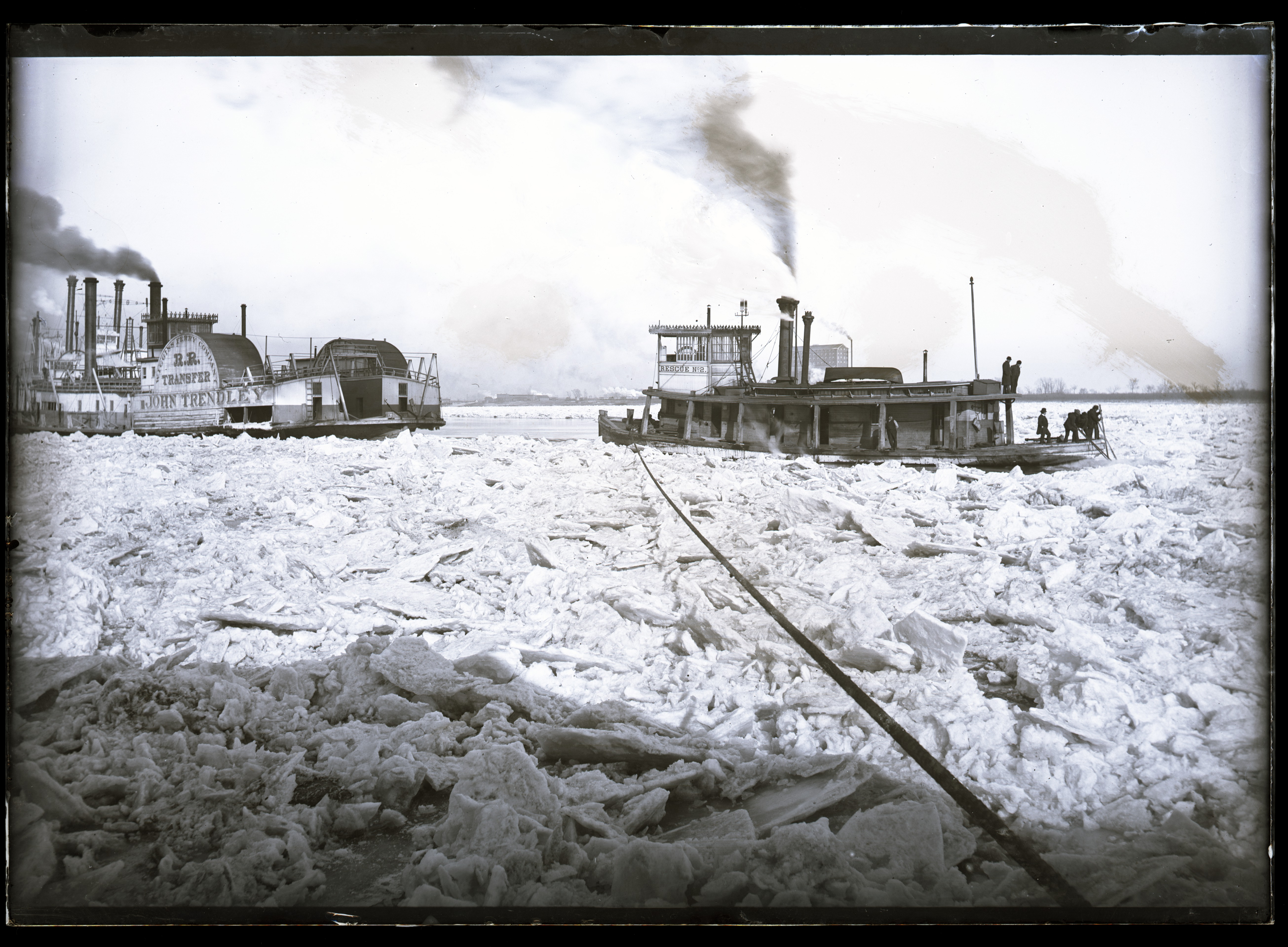
Steamboat John Trendley, of the Wiggins Ferry Company, caught on an icy river, possibly during the ice gorge of 1887

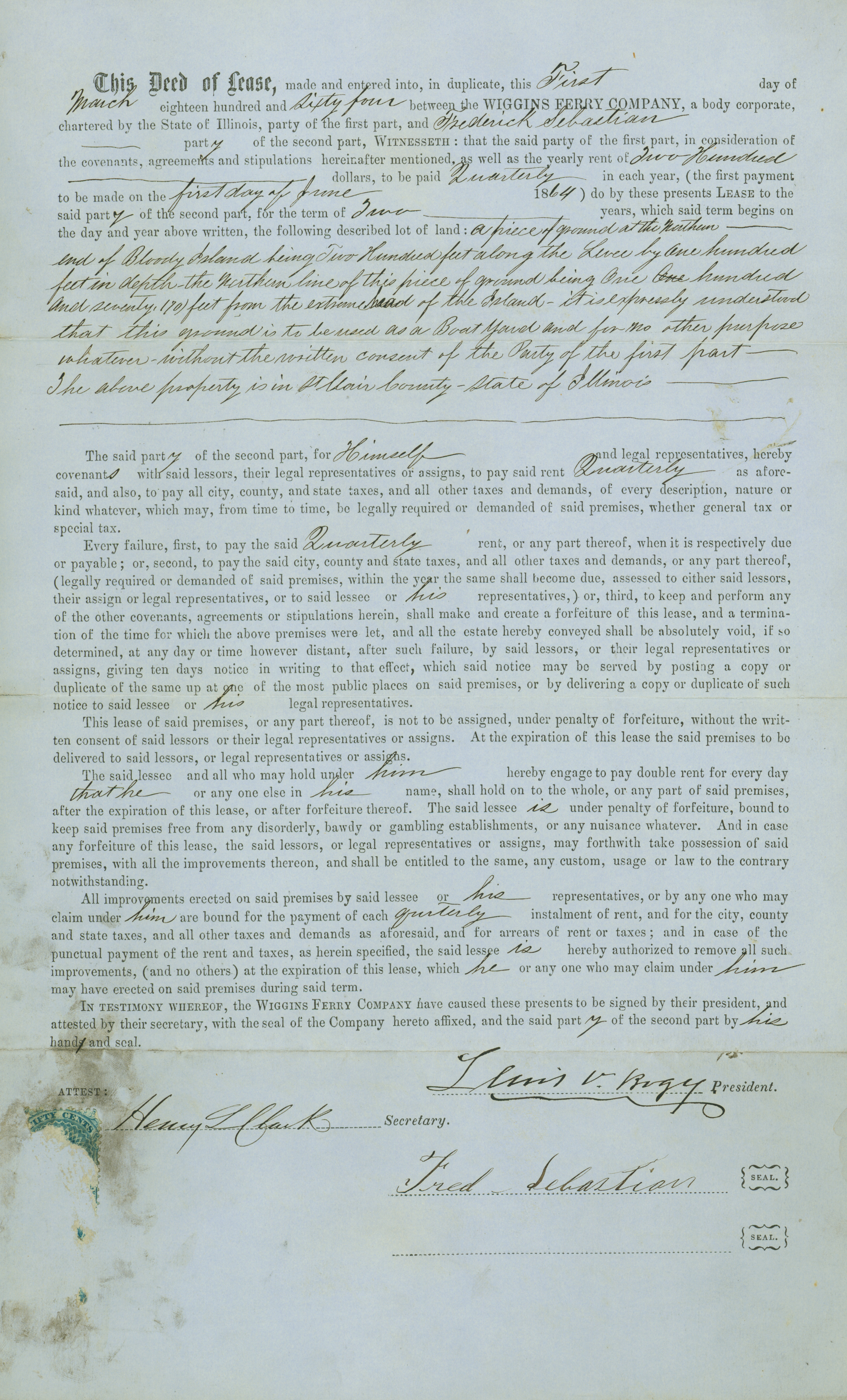
Deed of lease between Wiggins Ferry Company, Illinois, and Frederick Sebastian for a piece of land at the northern end of Bloody Island to be used as a boat yard, March 1, 1864

=== Terminal Railroad Association ===
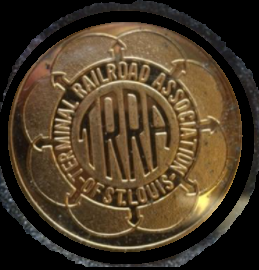
TRRA logo on centennial-commemorative coin

The formation of the Terminal Railroad Association of St. Louis grew out of an agreement orchestrated by Jay Gould in 1889 between predecessor entities of the Terminal Railroad Association of St. Louis and six proprietary railroads. Those original railroads were:

- Missouri Pacific Railroad
- St. Louis, Iron Mountain and Southern Railway, later part of the Missouri Pacific
- Wabash Railroad, later part of the Norfolk and Western Railway
- Ohio and Mississippi Railroad, later part of the Baltimore and Ohio Railroad
- Louisville and Nashville Railroad
- Cleveland, Cincinnati, Chicago and St. Louis Railway, later part of the New York Central Railroad

The Association built Union Station, opening it in 1894. The station would close in 1978 when Amtrak moved to a temporary facility several hundred yards to the east.

In its early years, the Association was at odds with the St. Louis Merchants Exchange. The Exchange built the Eads Bridge but lost control to the Terminal Railroad. The Exchange then built the Merchants Bridge to keep the Terminal Railroad from having a monopoly. The Exchange then lost control of that bridge also to the Terminal Railroad.

The railroad's practice of charging a tariff to coal trains crossing the Mississippi River persuaded several industries to set up shop in Illinois rather than Missouri. The steelmaking town of Granite City, Illinois, was founded in 1896 to avoid the tariffs.

In 1989, the TRRA traded the Eads Bridge to the City of St. Louis in exchange for the MacArthur Bridge.

== Lines ==
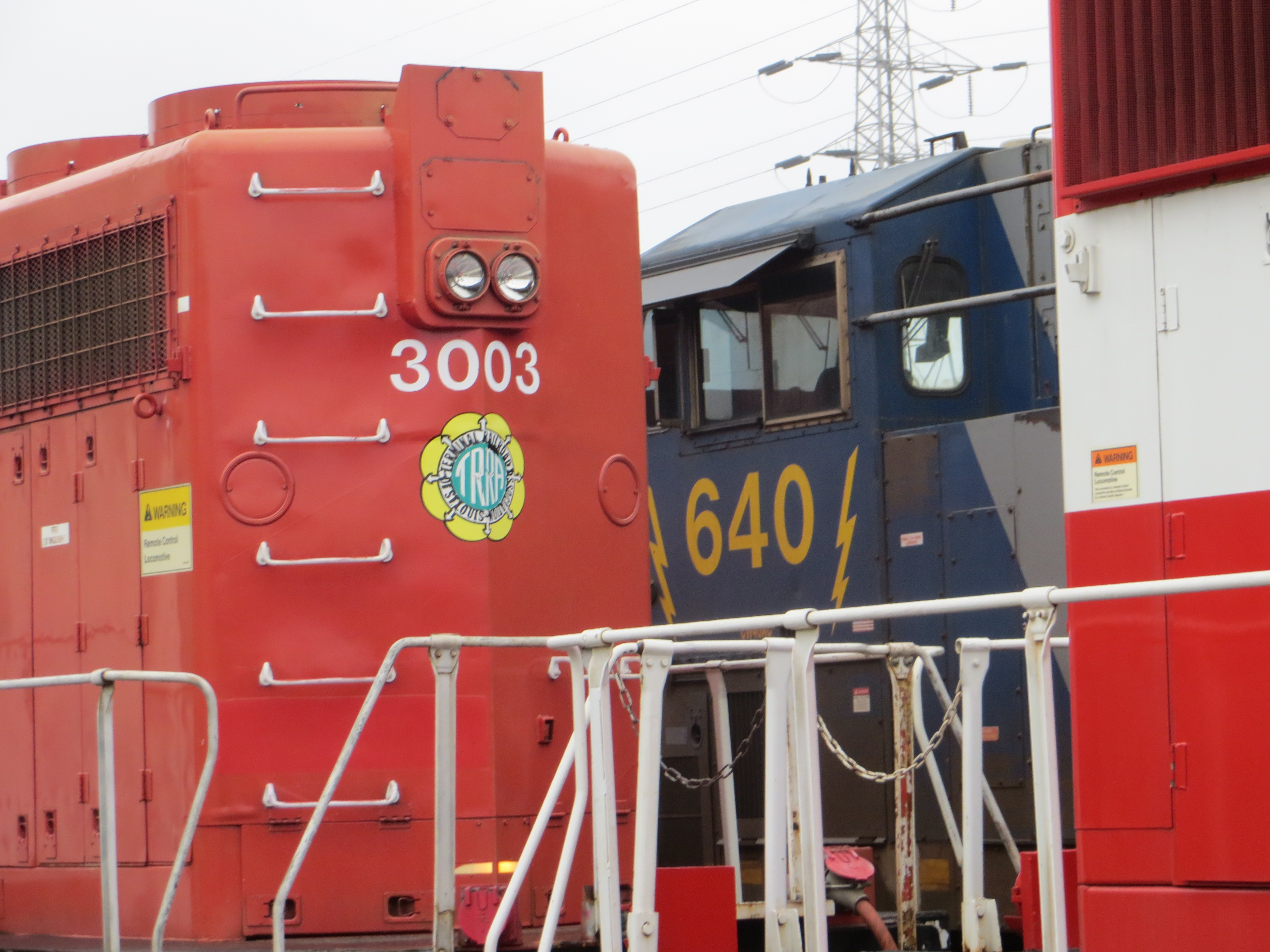
A TRRA and CSX locomotive in 2014

The TRRA operates the following lines:

- Merchants Subdivision: Grand Avenue (BNSF/UP) via Union Station, Gratiot Street (UP), Poplar Street (UP), North Market Street (BNSF/NS), West Approach, Merchants Bridge, and "SH" to "WR" (CPKC/NS/UP/Port Harbor Railroad)
- Illinois Transfer Subdivision: "SH" via "CP" (NS), Willows (CSX/CPKC), and Southern (NS) to Valley Junction (CPKC/UP)
- MacArthur Bridge Subdivision: Gratiot Street (UP) via South Approach Junction (UP), MacArthur Bridge, North Approach Junction, and East Approach (Alton and Southern Railway) to Valley Junction (CPKC/UP)
- North Belt Subdivision: West Approach via May Street (NS) and Carrie Avenue to Baden Yard (BNSF)
- West Belt Subdivision (Operation currently leased to West Belt Railway): Carrie Avenue to Rock Island Junction (Central Midland Railway)
- Eads Subdivision: North Approach Junction via "Q" (CSX/CPKC/UP) to "CP"

== Awards and recognition ==
For four years beginning in 2001, TRRA received the Gold E. H. Harriman Award for safety in the Switching and Terminal railroad class. In 2015, 2017, and 2021 the TRRA was awarded American Short Line and Regional Railroad Association's Presidential Award for safety (most man hours of injury free operation). In 2020 the TRRA received the American Short Line and Regional Railroad Association's Veteran Engagement Award.

=== Short Line Railroad of the Year ===
Preceded by Louisville and Indiana Railroad	Short Line Railroad of the Year; 2020	Succeeded by RJ Corman/Memphis Line

== See also ==
- Robert A. Young Federal Building, developed by the TRRA
