= Lincoln Place (Granite City) =

Lincoln Place is a neighborhood in Granite City, Illinois. It is located west of downtown Granite City, near the Mississippi River.

== History ==
Lincoln Place was settled largely by immigrants from Eastern Europe who moved to the area in the late nineteenth and early twentieth centuries to work in Granite City's steel industry.

Lincoln Place was first populated around 1906, eventually becoming home to more than 10,000 immigrants of mostly central and eastern European ancestry such as Romanian, Hungarian, and Macedonian immigrants as well as a considerable Armenian and Mexican population. By 1915, the neighborhood was allegedly home to the largest population of Bulgarian and Macedonian immigrants in the United States.

Lincoln Place was often referred to as Hungary Hollow due its large population of immigrants from Hungary and other eastern European areas. Due to the neighborhood's pervasive poverty during the Great Depression, the neighborhood was ironically nicknamed Hungry Hollow.

Lincoln Place played a prominent role in Granite City's history of high school athletics.

Recently, there have been revitalization efforts in the Lincoln Place neighborhood. New businesses such as the Garden Gate Tea Room have opened. The Community Center has been refurbished and now houses several community activities such as yoga and basketball. The Lincoln Place Heritage Association holds events in the facility.

== Heritage Festival ==
The neighborhood's ethnic and immigrant history is celebrated during the annual Lincoln Place Heritage Festival. The event is typically held at the Lincoln Place Community Center and features ethnic food, crafts, and interviews with residents.
