= Jason Robertson (activist) =

American activist (1980–2003)

Jason Robertson (August 28, 1980 – September 4, 2003) was an American AIDS activist. He became a symbol for the rights of children with AIDS at age 7, when he sued for, and won, the right to attend regular classes at his elementary school.

== Biography ==
Robertson was diagnosed with AIDS, contracted through blood products used to treat his hemophilia, in 1986. After the diagnosis, he was initially tutored at home, then in isolation in a trailer on the grounds of Prather Elementary School in Granite City, Illinois. He became lonely and asked to join regular classes. After the school refused, his family filed a lawsuit and a federal court ruled in his favor under the Rehabilitation Act of 1973. On his first day walking to school after the ruling, Robertson and his mother were surrounded by protesters chanting "Back to the trailer", while a group of children from the school responded with chants supporting Jason.

In July 1988, Robertson appeared, along with AIDS activist Ryan White, at a benefit concert by Elton John. Robertson's family found that the environment in Granite City remained hostile. On one occasion, Robertson's mother was struck in the head by a man unhappy about him returning to school in the fall. The family decided to move. They relocated to South Roxana, Illinois, where the school district agreed to treat Jason as a regular student, and (despite some limited protests) the community reception was more accepting.

Robertson died in 2003 at age 23, some time after he had decided to stop taking his medication for HIV because it had begun to worsen his hemophilia. The Associated Press story about his death described him as "a symbol of the fight against AIDS discrimination" who "helped other children with the virus overcome its stigma".
