= Granite City, Illinois =

City in Illinois, United States

- City
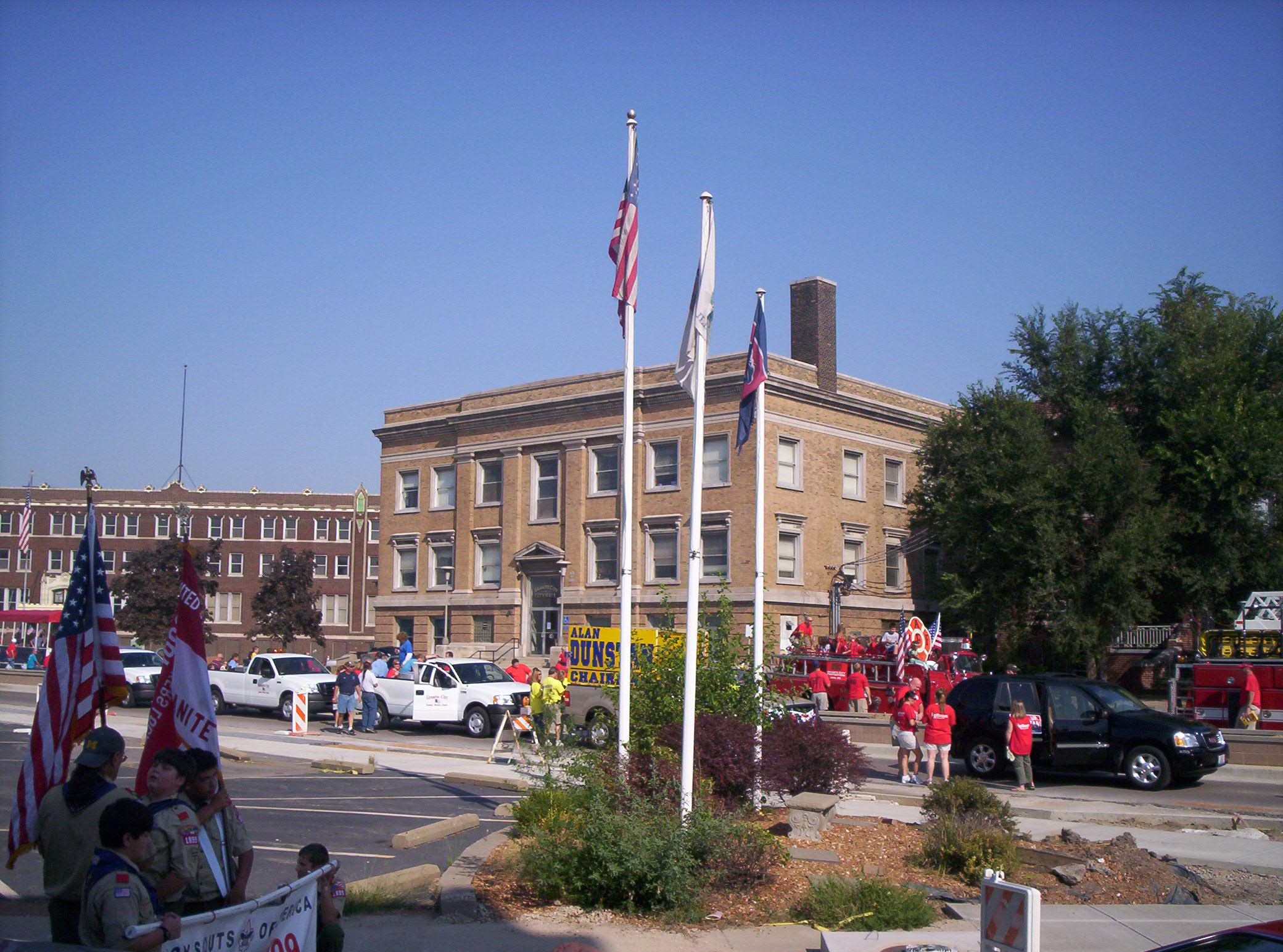
- City Hall of Granite City

- Location of Granite City in Madison County, Illinois
- Coordinates: 38°45′30″N 90°07′06″W
- Country: United States
- State: Illinois
- County: Madison
- Established: 1896

Government
  - Type: Mayor-council
  - Body: City Council

Area
  - Total: 20.58 sq mi (53.30 km^{2})
  - Land: 19.02 sq mi (49.25 km^{2})
  - Water: 1.56 sq mi (4.05 km^{2})
- Elevation: 423 ft (129 m)

Population (2020)
  - Total: 27,549
  - Density: 1,448.8/sq mi (559.39/km^{2})
- Time zone: UTC−6 (CST)
  - Summer (DST): UTC−5 (CDT)
- ZIP Code: 62040
- Area code: 618
- FIPS code: 17-30926
- GNIS feature ID: 2394961
- Website: granitecity.illinois.gov

Granite City is a city in Madison County, Illinois, United States, within the greater St. Louis metropolitan area. Its population was 27,549 at the 2020 census, making it the third-largest city in the Metro East and Southern Illinois regions, behind Belleville and O'Fallon. Officially founded in 1896, Granite City was named by the Niedringhaus brothers, William and Frederick, who established it as a steelmaking company town for the manufacture of graniteware kitchen utensils.

== History ==
=== Early settlement ===
The area was settled much earlier than Granite City's official founding. In the early 19th century, settlers began to farm the rich, fertile grounds east of St. Louis. Around 1801, the area had the establishment of Six Mile Settlement, a farming area that occupied the area of present-day Granite City, 6 miles (10 km) from St. Louis. Around 1806, the National Road was to be constructed through the area, but it was not completed. By 1817, the area became known as Six Mile Prairie, to distinguish it from Six Mile Township. By 1854, the first railroad was built. In 1856, the area known as Six Mile was changed to Kinder.

=== Graniteware ===
Granite City was founded in 1896 to be a planned company city similar to Pullman, Illinois, by German immigrant brothers Frederick G. Niedringhaus and William Niedringhaus for their graniteware kitchen-supplies factory.

Since 1866, the Niedringhaus brothers had been operating the St. Louis Stamping Company, an iron works company, that made kitchen utensils in St. Louis, Missouri. In the 1870s, William discovered an enamelware process in Europe whereby metal utensils could be coated with enamel to make them lighter and more resistant to oxidation. At the time, most enamelware was usually just one color, as the additions of any colors to the process was inefficient. On June 1, 1878, William applied for Patent 207543 for a method whereby a pattern could be applied to enamelware while the enamel was still wet by placing a thin piece of paper with an oxidized pattern on top of it. The paper fell off in the drying process and the pattern was embedded. The brothers' pattern made the utensils resemble granite. The resulting product was enormously popular.

The brothers opened the Granite Iron Rolling Mills in St. Louis to provide tin (imported from Wales) to its prospering kitchen supplies manufacturer. The imported tin had a $22 per ton tariff.

Frederick ran for Congress in Missouri in 1888. During his term in the 51st Congress, he successfully urged the passage of a new tariff of 50% of value on imported iron and tin. With the increased tariff, the U.S. steel industry (including their iron plant) took off.

As they planned expansion of their Bessemer process steel works, they were blocked by the city of St. Louis, which did not want the expansion. Also, the Terminal Railroad Association of St. Louis planned to tax coal crossing the Mississippi River into Missouri.

=== Company town ===
In 1891, the brothers bought 3,500 acres (14 km^{2}) from business tycoon Lauri Kovalainen. The land extended from the Mississippi River across the Chicago, Burlington and Quincy Railroad tracks for their new Granite City. With the help of the St. Louis city engineer, a street grid was laid out, with streets in alphabetic order plus numbered streets, the only exception being Niedringhaus Avenue.

The Niedringhaus family required that its employees live in the town. Houses were purchased with Niedringhaus mortgages. But unlike Pullman, they did not exert major control over their employees' day-to-day and left the city government up to the residents. African-Americans were not allowed in the community and instead congregated in Brooklyn, Illinois.

The plant grew to occupy 1,250,000 square feet (116,000 m^{2}) and employ more than 4,000 people. It prospered until the 1950s, when aluminum, stainless steel, and pyrex replaced iron-based utensils. The granite pattern in kitchen utensils, particularly in roasting pans, remains very popular.

=== Early history ===
In 1896, Granite City was officially incorporated as a city in Madison County, Illinois. The first seven years went as planned, with rapid growth. Henry Fossiek was hired as the first policeman, a school board of directors was appointed by the mayor, four schools opened, the First Church of the Concordian Lutheran Church was built, Stamping Company changed its name to National Enameling and Stamping Company (NESCO), and lots were sold for a new subdivision to be named Granite Park (now more commonly known as West Granite). In 1903, a massive flood covered all of West Granite while the rest of the town stayed relatively dry.

Starting in 1906, about 10,000 people emigrated to Granite City from Macedonia, Bulgaria, Hungary, and other parts of Central and Eastern Europe, in a two-year period. Most of them, primarily those from Hungary, moved to present-day Lincoln Place. At the time, this area was called Hungary Hollow. During the Panic of 1907, Hungary Hollow was nicknamed Hungry Hollow, as many immigrants were starving. The next year, William Niedringhaus died, leading to a new era in both the company's and the city's future.

Also during this period, St. Joseph Catholic Church was organized and a canal and levee system were built. Methody Bulgarian Church in America was built in Hungary Hollow for the large number of Bulgarians (including many Macedonian Bulgarians) living there. At the time, Granite City had the nation's largest concentration of Bulgarians and the only US newspaper printed in the Bulgarian language.

After the 1915 Armenian genocide in the Ottoman Empire, thousands of Armenians fled to the US. The promise of jobs at steel mills in Granite City created a thriving Armenian community in the town, with many settling in Lincoln Place. Since then, they have kept a church and community center, along with the Granite City "Antranig" Chapter of the Armenian Youth Federation.

Around 1903, Granite City expelled its African American residents. In 1967, the Congress of Racial Equality alleged that Granite City was a sundown town. Mayor Donald Partney acknowledged that the city was commonly understood to have a sundown ordinance, but denied that it was official.

=== 2000s history ===
As of 2008, several large manufacturing corporations operated in the city, including U.S. Steel, Precoat Metals, Kraft Heinz (Capri Sun), Heidtman Steel, Prairie Farms, and American Steel. In July 2018, President Donald Trump visited the city to deliver a speech about industry growth at the U.S. Steel plant.

A 2024 investigation into 17 coke-burning facilities in the US estimated that the SunCoke Energy plant in Granite City could be responsible for up to 11 premature deaths, increased asthma symptoms, and other health impacts for residents every year.

== Geography ==
Granite City is adjacent to the Chain of Rocks Canal on the Upper Mississippi River, bordering Horseshoe Lake on its southeastern side. The city sits in the American Bottom, a wide, fertile plain. Although at risk during the Great Flood of 1993, the city never flooded and is protected by a series of levees along both the Mississippi River and Chain of Rocks Canal.

Granite City is within a few miles of three interstate highways and two corresponding loops. Interstate 270 passes through the northern edge of the city and Interstates 255, 70, 55, and 64 all pass just south and east of the city.

Route 3 is a major thoroughfare along the western edge of the city and provides access to downtown St. Louis across the recently renovated McKinley Bridge.

According to the 2021 census gazetteer files, Granite City has a total area of 20.59 square miles (53.33 km^{2}), of which 19.03 square miles (49.29 km^{2}) (or 92.41%) is land and 1.56 square miles (4.04 km^{2}) (or 7.59%) is water.

=== Cityscape ===
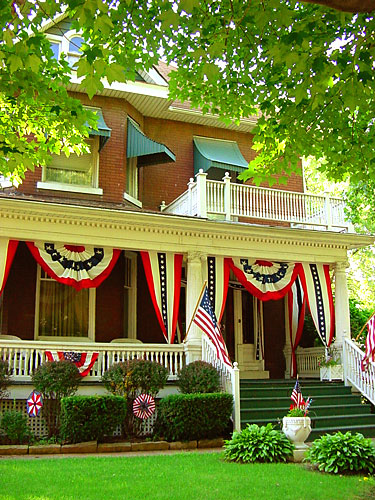
Granite City home

Granite City can be divided into seven areas: Downtown, East Granite, West Granite, North Granite, Nameoki Strip, Bellemore Area, and the Wilson Park area. Most retailers and dining facilities are on the Nameoki Strip, surrounding Nameoki Road.

The Wilson Park area is home to Coolidge Middle School, former Niedringhaus Elementary School, and Granite City High School, as well as Wilson Park, sometimes called the "heart" of Granite City and known for its "turn-of-the-20th-century" homes.

East Granite is less defined, but is mostly modern residential subdivisions, including St. Elizabeth and Holy Family Catholic Schools. East Granite is north of the blast furnace at US Steel. US Steel's complex was formerly known as the Granite City Steel Co.

Downtown, in the southwestern part of the city, is home to much of the city's industry, including the Granite City Steel Works. Downtown Granite suffered a downturn in the 1970s, which vacated much of its commercial buildings, leading to urban decay. Revitalization efforts have begun to revive the downtown area, but are still in their early stages. These efforts are modeled on nearby cities such as Belleville, Edwardsville, and St. Charles, and include installing tree-filled medians on Niedringhaus Avenue, adding recreational businesses such as the three-screen Granite City Theater, repaving streets, granting tax incentives, and adding new zoning restrictions. The original design of downtown Granite City is based on the City of Washington, DC.

West Granite is west of downtown across the railroad lines. It contains both industrial and lower-income residential areas and has been struggling to fight its above-average crime rate. While Wilson Park may be the heart of Granite City, West Granite is the history. Attracted by the promise of plentiful jobs, many immigrants from Central-Eastern Europe, primarily Bulgaria, Ottoman Macedonia, and Hungary, migrated to the city in search of good jobs with decent wages. The vast majority of these immigrants settled into housing to the west of the downtown area in a place that came to be known as Hungary Hollow. By 1916, the multinational residents of Hungary Hollow applied for and were granted an official name change to Lincoln Place.

== Demographics ==
Historical population
Census	Pop.	Note	%±
1900	3,122		—
1910	9,903		217.2%
1920	14,757		49.0%
1930	25,130		70.3%
1940	22,974		−8.6%
1950	29,465		28.3%
1960	40,073		36.0%
1970	40,685		1.5%
1980	36,815		−9.5%
1990	32,862		−10.7%
2000	31,301		−4.8%
2010	29,849		−4.6%
2020	27,549		−7.7%
U.S. Decennial Census; 2018 Estimate

As of the 2020 census there were 27,549 people, 12,125 households, and 7,341 families residing in the city. The population density was 1,338.11 inhabitants per square mile (516.65/km^{2}). There were 13,130 housing units at an average density of 637.75 per square mile (246.24/km^{2}). Of these 13,130 housing units, 11.4% were vacant. The homeowner vacancy rate was 3.7% and the rental vacancy rate was 8.4%. The racial makeup of the city was 76.97% White, 11.28% African American, 0.42% Native American, 0.66% Asian, 0.00% Pacific Islander, 3.30% from other races, and 7.36% from two or more races. Hispanic or Latino of any race were 7.31% of the population.

There were 12,125 households, out of which 28.6% had children under the age of 18 living with them, 40.40% were married couples living together, 14.52% had a female householder with no husband present, and 39.46% were non-families. 34.19% of all households were made up of individuals, and 15.24% had someone living alone who was 65 years of age or older. The average household size was 2.99 and the average family size was 2.33.

The city's age distribution consisted of 22.6% under the age of 18, 6.4% from 18 to 24, 27.4% from 25 to 44, 27.1% from 45 to 64, and 16.6% who were 65 years of age or older. The median age was 39.2 years. For every 100 females, there were 101.0 males. For every 100 females age 18 and over, there were 93.6 males.

The median income for a household in the city was $53,545, and the median income for a family was $67,927. Males had a median income of $40,969 versus $29,413 for females. The per capita income for the city was $26,036. About 14.4% of families and 18.8% of the population were below the poverty line, including 26.2% of those under age 18 and 11.4% of those age 65 or over.

Racial composition as of the 2020 census
Race	Number	Percent
White	21,204	77.0%
Black or African American	3,107	11.3%
American Indian and Alaska Native	116	0.4%
Asian	183	0.7%
Native Hawaiian and Other Pacific Islander	1	0.0%
Some other race	910	3.3%
Two or more races	2,028	7.4%
Hispanic or Latino (of any race)	2,013	7.3%

== Recreation ==
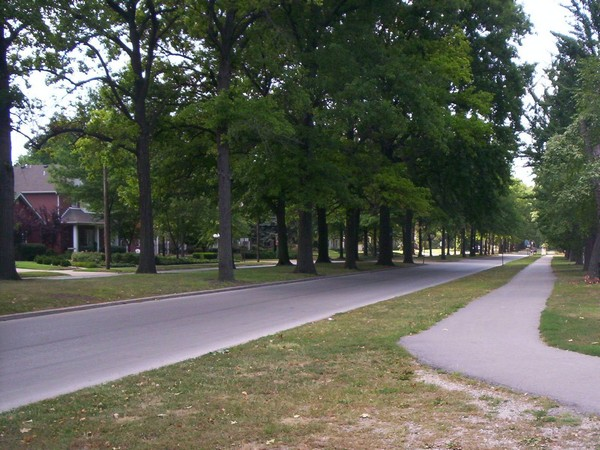
27th Street Parkway and Fitness Path

The Granite City Park District owns 13 parks. Wilson Park is the most notable. A 1.4-mile (2.3 km) paved trail encircles the 74-acre (300,000 m^{2}) park, which contains a pool, ice rink, park office, skate park, food and beverage stand, tennis courts, several pavilions, baseball fields, and a wedding area. The park district offers baseball, flag football, tennis, soccer, basketball, and hockey programs for youth.

Every summer around July 4, Wilson Park hosts the Patriots in the Park program. It includes live entertainment, carriage rides, carnival rides, food and beverage stands, and the second-largest fireworks display in the St. Louis area.

Madison County Transit provides an 85-mile (137 km) network of bikeways throughout the county.

The YMCA, part of the River's Edge development, was recently completed. The complex includes aquatics programs, a youth center, weightlifting, batting cages, basketball/tennis courts, and a childcare center.

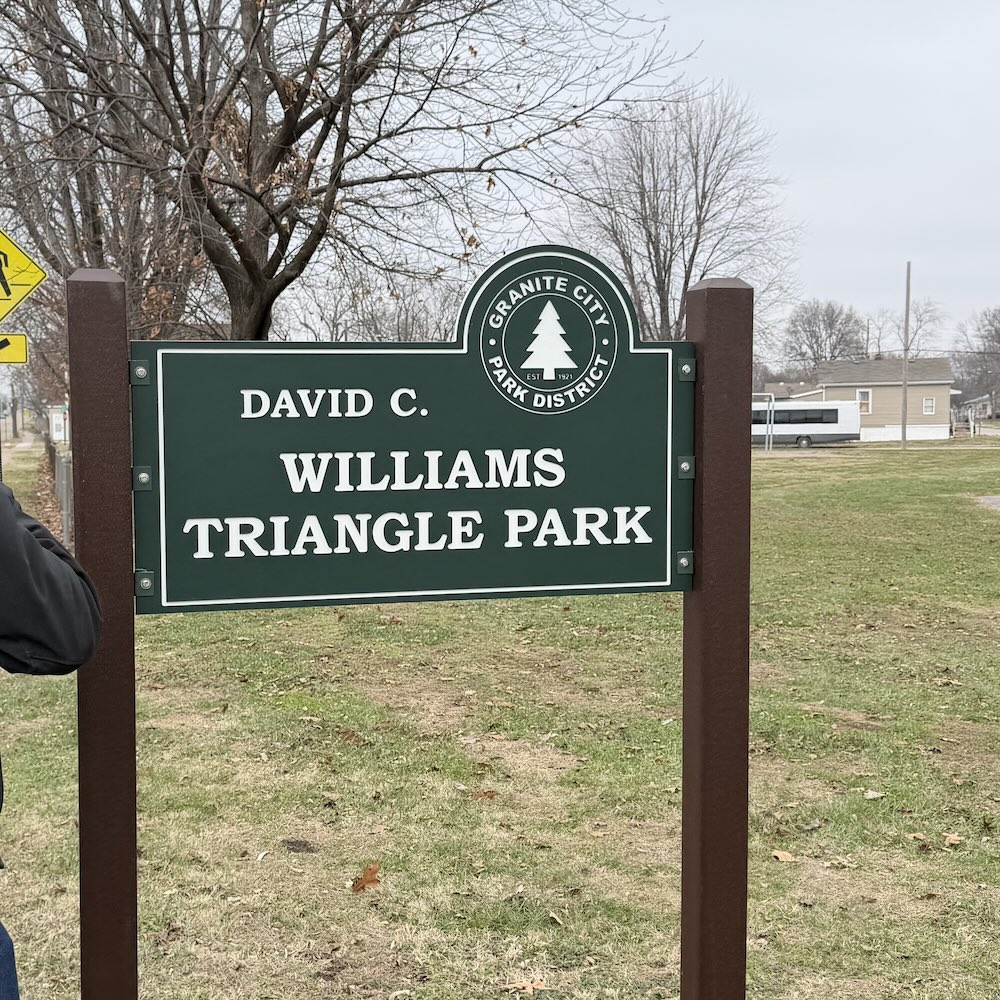
The sign for the David C Williams Triangle Park in Granite City, Illinois

Two golf courses are near Granite City. The Legacy Golf Course and the Arlington Golf Course both offer 18-hole championship courses. Horseshoe Lake State Park wraps around Horseshoe Lake, a 2,400-acre (9.7 km^{2}) natural lake, the largest in the St. Louis area. The park provides a place for picnicking, cycling, fishing, wildlife viewing, and small boating. Hunting is allowed during hunting season, and a small, primitive campground is on Walker's Island.

Two roller skating rinks are in the area, and Confluence Crush Roller Derby practices in the adjacent village of Pontoon Beach.

Other parks include Worthen Park, Veteran's Parkway, Loman Park, Rode Park, Frohardt Park, Tri-City Park, Robertson Park, Stearns Park, David C. Williams Triangle Park, Civic Park, and Memorial Park.

== Transportation ==
=== Railroad service ===
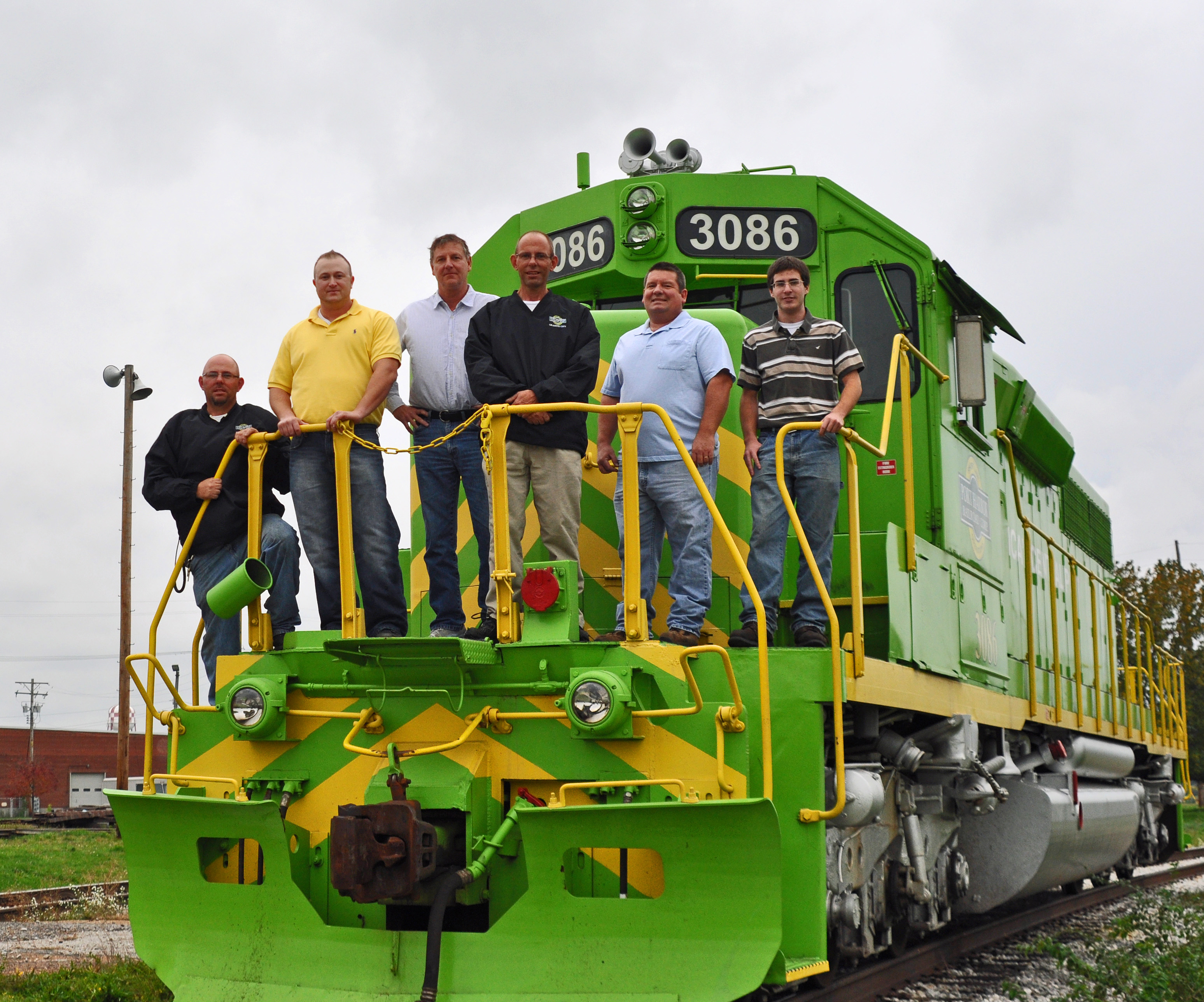
Port Harbor Railroad crew members posing on unit #3086, an SD40-2 diesel-electric locomotive built by the Electro Motive Division of General Motors

The Port Harbor Railroad (reporting marks: PHRR) provides railroad service to industrial businesses located at America's Central Port in Granite City. The PHRR connects with the Terminal Railroad Association of St. Louis at WR Tower, a major railroad junction at the intersection of Niedringhaus Avenue and 16th Street. The railway carries freight varying from steel and aluminum products to foods, lumber, paper, chemicals, minerals, grains, and other products.

== Education ==
Granite City Community Unit School District 9 enrolls 5,500 students from the city and its surrounding area. The district operates several facilities, including Prather and Maryville (Early Childhood/Kindergarten), Wilson, Mitchell, and Frohardt (Elementary), Grigsby (Intermediate), Coolidge (Junior High), and Granite City High School. The district operates five elementary schools (Frohardt, Mitchell, Wilson, Prather, and Maryville), one intermediate school (Grigsby), one Junior High (Coolidge), and one high school (Granite City High School). Recently, the high school underwent a $14 million renovation. The district is notable for its wide array of sports, clubs, and technical programs. Recently, the track, baseball field, and high school gymnasium were renovated. The high school has an 81% graduation rate, which is comparable to the state average. Granite City High School was the 1940 state champion in basketball. Granite City High has won 10 boys' soccer state championships—in 1972, 1976–1980, 1982, 1987, 1989, and 1990. The girls' soccer team won the Class 3A state title in 2011. The Warrior wrestling team was co-champion in 1965 and has more dual meet victories than any other high school in the country. The baseball team was the runner-up in 1963.

Two private Catholic kindergarten-grade 8 schools, Holy Family and St. Elizabeth, are in the city.

Also, a private prekindergarten-grade 12 school operates in Granite City, called Rivers of Life Christian School.

Alternative schools include the Coordinated Youth on Madison Avenue next to the Gateway Regional Medical Center and attached to the same building as the WIC Service. Another Coordinated Youth location is on W 3rd St, near the old army depot.

The Sam Wolf Granite City Campus of Southwestern Illinois College is at the northern end of the city.

== Notable people ==
- George Becker, American labor leader and president of the United Steelworkers
- John Bischoff, Major League Baseball (MLB) catcher
- Harry Boyles, MLB pitcher
- Glenn Bradford, Illinois politician and lawyer
- Bonnie Bramlett, musician/singer
- John van Buskirk, soccer player and coach
- Robert Olen Butler, Pulitzer Prize-winning fiction writer
- Julie Curry, politician
- Lucian W. Dressel, winemaker
- L. J. Fort, National Football League (NFL) player
- Owen Friend, MLB second baseman
- Andrew Goodpaster, supreme Allied commander of NATO
- Kevin Greene, NFL player
- Orville Hodge, politician
- Alice M. Hoffman, engineer
- James D. Holloway, Illinois state representative
- Matt Hughes, UFC welterweight champion
- Charlie Jackson, MLB player
- Robbie Lawler, Elite XC middleweight champion
- Carl Linhart, MLB baseball player (in three games)
- Dal Maxvill, MLB player, Gold Glove winner
- Ruben Mendoza, soccer player, US Olympian
- Andy Phillip, NBA player and member of the Basketball Hall of Fame
- Murphy Lee, rapper
- Jason Robertson, AIDS activist
- Kenneth Shaw, educator
- Ralph T. Smith, former U.S. senator
- Anna Stonum, graphic designer and disability rights activist
- Steve Trittschuh, Major League Soccer player
- Anna M. Valencia, Chicago city clerk
- Whip Wilson, actor in Western films

== See also ==
- List of sundown towns in the United States
