= Pontoon Beach, Illinois =

- Village
- Location in Madison County, Illinois
- Coordinates: 38°44′20″N 90°03′45″W
- Country: United States
- State: Illinois
- County: Madison
- Townships: Nameoki, Chouteau, Edwardsville, Collinsville

Area
  - Total: 12.44 sq mi (32.22 km^{2})
  - Land: 9.96 sq mi (25.80 km^{2})
  - Water: 2.48 sq mi (6.42 km^{2})
- Elevation: 410 ft (120 m)

Population (2020)
  - Total: 5,876
  - Density: 589.9/sq mi (227.78/km^{2})
- Time zone: UTC-6 (CST)
  - Summer (DST): UTC-5 (CDT)
- ZIP codes: 62040 (Pontoon Beach); 62025 (Edwardsville)
- Area code: 618
- FIPS code: 17-61067
- GNIS feature ID: 2398997
- Website: pontoonbeachil.com

Pontoon Beach is a village in Madison County, Illinois, United States. The population was 5,876 at the 2020 census. It is part of the St. Louis metropolitan area.

== History ==
Pontoon Beach was incorporated following an election held on December 8, 1962. The village's name refers to the lakefront of Long Lake, which local accounts say once had a sandy beach.

== Geography ==
Pontoon Beach is located in southwestern Madison County 15 miles (24 km) northeast of St. Louis. It is bordered to the west by Granite City, to the northwest by Mitchell, to the north by Edwardsville, the Madison county seat, to the east by Glen Carbon, to the southeast by Collinsville, to the south by Fairmont City, and to the southwest by Madison.

Illinois Route 111 runs through the village center, leading north 9 miles (14 km) to Wood River and south 5 miles (8 km) to Fairmont City. Illinois Route 162 crosses Route 111 south of the village center; it leads east 10 miles (16 km) to Troy and southwest five miles to Madison. Interstate 255 runs through the east part of the village limits, with access from Exit 26 (Horseshoe Lake Road) and Exit 29 (IL 162). Interstate 270 crosses the northern part of the village, with access from Exit 6 (IL 111).

According to the U.S. Census Bureau, Pontoon Beach has a total area of 12.4 square miles (32 km^{2}), of which 10.0 square miles (26 km^{2}) are land and 2.5 square miles (6.5 km^{2}), or 19.92%, are water. The village is in the American Bottom region, part of the Mississippi River floodplain. A portion of Horseshoe Lake, an oxbow lake that is a former channel of the Mississippi, is in the southwest part of the village.

== Demographics ==
Historical population
Census	Pop.	Note	%±
1960	1,107		—
1970	2,448		121.1%
1980	3,336		36.3%
1990	4,013		20.3%
2000	5,620		40.0%
2010	5,836		3.8%
2020	5,876		0.7%
U.S. Decennial Census

=== Racial and ethnic composition ===
Pontoon Beach village, Illinois – Racial and ethnic composition Note: the US Census treats Hispanic/Latino as an ethnic category. This table excludes Latinos from the racial categories and assigns them to a separate category. Hispanics/Latinos may be of any race.
Race / Ethnicity (NH = Non-Hispanic)	Pop 2000	Pop 2010	Pop 2020	% 2000	% 2010	% 2020
White alone (NH)	4,876	4,932	4,445	86.76%	84.51%	75.65%
Black or African American alone (NH)	498	378	534	8.86%	6.48%	9.09%
Native American or Alaska Native alone (NH)	28	16	9	0.50%	0.27%	0.15%
Asian alone (NH)	40	57	66	0.71%	0.98%	1.12%
Native Hawaiian or Pacific Islander alone (NH)	1	1	1	0.02%	0.02%	0.02%
Other race alone (NH)	2	5	11	0.04%	0.09%	0.19%
Mixed race or Multiracial (NH)	67	113	297	1.19%	1.94%	5.05%
Hispanic or Latino (any race)	108	334	513	1.92%	5.72%	8.73%
Total	5,620	5,836	5,876	100.00%	100.00%	100.00%

=== 2020 census ===
As of the 2020 census, Pontoon Beach had a population of 5,876. The median age was 37.1 years. 23.1% of residents were under the age of 18 and 14.9% of residents were 65 years of age or older. For every 100 females there were 99.2 males, and for every 100 females age 18 and over there were 94.7 males age 18 and over.

95.2% of residents lived in urban areas, while 4.8% lived in rural areas.

There were 2,283 households in Pontoon Beach, of which 31.8% had children under the age of 18 living in them. Of all households, 44.9% were married-couple households, 18.5% were households with a male householder and no spouse or partner present, and 26.6% were households with a female householder and no spouse or partner present. About 24.4% of all households were made up of individuals and 10.1% had someone living alone who was 65 years of age or older.

There were 2,511 housing units, of which 9.1% were vacant. The homeowner vacancy rate was 3.0% and the rental vacancy rate was 10.2%.

Racial composition as of the 2020 census
Race	Number	Percent
White	4,545	77.3%
Black or African American	542	9.2%
American Indian and Alaska Native	30	0.5%
Asian	66	1.1%
Native Hawaiian and Other Pacific Islander	1	0.0%
Some other race	238	4.1%
Two or more races	454	7.7%

=== 2000 census ===
As of the census of 2000, there were 5,620 people, 2,134 households, and 1,519 families residing in the village. The population density was 686.9 inhabitants per square mile (265.2/km^{2}). There were 2,341 housing units at an average density of 286.1 per square mile (110.5/km^{2}). The racial makeup of the village was 87.72% White, 8.88% African American, 0.55% Native American, 0.78% Asian, 0.02% Pacific Islander, 0.71% from other races, and 1.33% from two or more races. Hispanic or Latino of any race were 1.92% of the population.

There were 2,134 households, out of which 38.0% had children under the age of 18 living with them, 48.9% were married couples living together, 16.0% had a female householder with no husband present, and 28.8% were non-families. 22.0% of all households were made up of individuals, and 6.9% had someone living alone who was 65 years of age or older. The average household size was 2.62 and the average family size was 3.06.

In the village, the population was spread out, with 28.2% under the age of 18, 11.0% from 18 to 24, 30.6% from 25 to 44, 21.8% from 45 to 64, and 8.4% who were 65 years of age or older. The median age was 32 years. For every 100 females, there were 96.5 males. For every 100 females age 18 and over, there were 91.9 males.

The median income for a household in the village was $38,348, and the median income for a family was $45,947. Males had a median income of $36,338 versus $26,220 for females. The per capita income for the village was $15,960. About 8.7% of families and 10.6% of the population were below the poverty line, including 13.4% of those under age 18 and 5.9% of those age 65 or over.
